= MasterChef: A Revanche =

- Genre: Cooking
- Based on: MasterChef Australia All-Stars
- Presented by: Ana Paula Padrão
- Judges: Érick Jacquin; Paola Carosella; Henrique Fogaça
- Country of origin: Brazil
- Original language: Portuguese
- No. of seasons: 1
- No. of episodes: 10

Production
- Producers: Eyeworks; Shine International
- Running time: 120 minutes

Original release
- Network: Band
- Release: October 15 – December 17, 2019

Related
- MasterChef; MasterChef Junior; MasterChef Profissionais; MasterChef + MasterChef Confeitaria; MasterChef Creators; MasterChef Celebridades

MasterChef: A Revanche (English: MasterChef: The Rematch) is a Brazilian cooking competition television series featuring twenty returning contestants from the first six seasons of MasterChef, for another chance to win. The series premiered on Tuesday, October 15, 2019 at 10:45 p.m. (BRT / AMT) on Band.

Vitor Bourguignon from season 4 won the competition against Estefano Zaquini from season 1 on December 17, 2019.

== Format ==
Former contestants from the first six seasons of MasterChef, who didn't win their respective seasons, returning for another chance to win the competition. The grand prize was R$250.000, a scholarship on Le Cordon Bleu in Rio de Janeiro, a year's supply on Carrefour worth R$1.000 per month, a complete kitchen of the new Brastemp Gourmand line, a Tramontina kit of pots, knives, barbecue and small home appliances by Breville and the MasterChef: A Revanche trophy.

== Contestants ==
=== Top 20 ===
| Contestant | Age | Previous season | Result |
|---|---|---|---|
| Ana Luiza Teixeira | 29 | Season 4; 9th place | Eliminated on October 15 |
| Aristeu Guimarães | 34 | Season 5; 12th place | Eliminated on October 15 |
| Bianca Bertolaccini | 41 | Season 1; 13th place | Eliminated on October 15 |
| Cecilia Padilha | 38 | Season 1; 6th place | Eliminated on October 15 |
| Haila Santuá | 26 | Season 6; 5th place | Eliminated on October 15 |
| Iranete Santana | 51 | Season 2; 11th place | Eliminated on October 15 |
| Juliana Nicoli | 36 | Season 6; 4th place | Eliminated on October 15 |
| Mirian Cobre | 61 | Season 4; 6th place | Eliminated on October 15 |
| Raquel Novais | 36 | Season 3; 3rd place | Eliminated on October 15 |
| Valter Herzmann | 42 | Season 4; 3rd place | Eliminated on October 15 |

=== Top 10 ===
| Contestant | Age | Previous season | Result | Winnings |
|---|---|---|---|---|
| Vitor Bourguignon | 28 | Season 4; 7th place | Winner on December 17 | 6 |
| Estefano Zaquini | 24 | Season 1; 9th place | Runner-up on December 17 | 5 |
| Fernando Kawasaki | 33 | Season 2; 5th place | Eliminated on December 10 | 4 |
| Thiago Gatto | 36 | Season 5; 4th place | Eliminated on December 3 | 4 |
| Katleen Lacerda | 26 | Season 5; 5th place | Eliminated on November 26 | 3 |
| Fernando Bianchi | 35 | Season 3; 10th place | Eliminated on November 19 | 1 |
| Fábio Nunes | 33 | Season 3; 5th place | Eliminated on November 12 | 1 |
| Sabrina Kanai | 33 | Season 2; 7th place | Eliminated on November 5 | 2 |
| Vanessa Vagnotti | 49 | Season 3; 13th place | Eliminated on October 29 | 1 |
| Helton Oliveira | 19 | Season 6; 6th place | Eliminated on October 22 | 0 |

== Elimination table ==
| Place | Contestant | Episode | | | | | | | | | | | | |
| Place | Contestant | 2 | 3 | | 4 | 5 | | 6 | 7 | | 8 | 9 | | 10 |
|---|---|---|---|---|---|---|---|---|---|---|---|---|---|---|
| 1 | Vitor | WIN | WIN | IMM | NPT | HIGH | IMM | WIN | HIGH | IMM | WIN | IN | WIN | WINNER |
| 2 | Estefano | WIN | LOW | IMM | WIN | WIN | IMM | NPT | HIGH | IMM | WIN | WIN | IMM | RUNNER-UP |
| 3 | Fernando K. | NPT | HIGH | IMM | WIN | HIGH | IMM | WIN | WIN | IMM | WIN | IN | ELIM | |
| 4 | Thiago | WIN | IN | IMM | WIN | LOW | IMM | WIN | LOW | WIN | ELIM | | | |
| 5 | Katleen | WIN | IN | IMM | NPT | LOW | WIN | WIN | LOW | ELIM | | | | |
| 6 | Fernando B. | NPT | LOW | IMM | WIN | HIGH | IMM | ELIM | | | | | | |
| 7 | Fábio | NPT | HIGH | IMM | WIN | LOW | ELIM | | | | | | | |
| 8 | Sabrina | WIN | LOW | WIN | ELIM | | | | | | | | | |
| 9 | Vanessa | WIN | LOW | ELIM | | | | | | | | | | |
| 10 | Helton | ELIM | | | | | | | | | | | | |

=== Key ===
- Winner
- Runner-up
- Individual challenge winner
- Individual challenge top entry
- Mystery Box bottom entry
- Team challenge winner
- Team challenge loser (PT)
- Immunity
- Immunity extra
- Saved first
- Saved last
- Eliminated

== Ratings and reception ==
| Season | Timeslot (BRT) | Premiered | | Ended | | TV season | SP viewers (in points) | Source |
| Season | Timeslot (BRT) | Date | Viewers (in points) | Date | Viewers (in points) | TV season | SP viewers (in points) | Source |
|---|---|---|---|---|---|---|---|---|
| 1 | Tuesday 10:45 p.m. | October 15, 2019 | 2.9 | December 17, 2019 | 3.7 | 2019–20 | 3.13 | |

- Each point represents a specific number of households in São Paulo.
  - 2019: 73.015 households.

=== Brazilian ratings ===
All numbers are in points and provided by Kantar Ibope Media.

| Episode | Title | Air date | Timeslot (BRT) | SP viewers (in points) | BR viewers (in points) | Source |
|---|---|---|---|---|---|---|
| 1 | Top 20 – Duels | October 15, 2019 | Tuesday 10:45 p.m. | 2.9 | 2.5 | |
| 2 | Top 10 | October 22, 2019 | Tuesday 10:45 p.m. | 2.8 | 2.3 | |
| 3 | Top 9 | October 29, 2019 | Tuesday 10:45 p.m. | 3.3 | 2.5 | |
| 4 | Top 8 | November 5, 2019 | Tuesday 10:45 p.m. | 3.4 | 2.4 | |
| 5 | Top 7 | November 12, 2019 | Tuesday 10:45 p.m. | 3.2 | 2.5 | |
| 6 | Top 6 | November 19, 2019 | Tuesday 10:45 p.m. | 3.1 | 2.4 | |
| 7 | Top 5 | November 26, 2019 | Tuesday 10:45 p.m. | 3.1 | 2.3 | |
| 8 | Top 4 | December 3, 2019 | Tuesday 10:45 p.m. | 3.1 | 2.2 | |
| 9 | Top 3 | December 10, 2019 | Tuesday 10:45 p.m. | 2.7 | 2.1 | |
| 10 | Winner announced | December 17, 2019 | Tuesday 10:45 p.m. | 3.7 | 2.6 | |

- In 2019, each point represents 254.892 households in 15 market cities in Brazil (73.015 households in São Paulo).
