= MasterChef (Brazilian TV series) season 7 =

MasterChef
- Season 7
- Presented by: Ana Paula Padrão
- Judges: Érick Jacquin; Paola Carosella; Henrique Fogaça
- No. of contestants: 184
- Winner: Anna Paula
- Runners-up: Hailton; Heitor
- No. of episodes: 25

Release
- Original network: Band
- Original release: 14 July – 29 December 2020

Season chronology
- ← Previous; Season 6 Next → Season 8

The seventh season of the Brazilian competitive reality television series MasterChef premiered on 14 July 2020 at 10:45 p.m. on Band.

The season was originally set to premiere on May, however, due to the impacts of the COVID-19 pandemic, filming was postponed to 20 June 2020 under a new format. Unlike the standard format, this season, each week new amateur chefs compete in a series of tests to secure a place in the final and a chance to win the grand prize and the MasterChef trophy.

First stage winners were awarded a R$5.000 prize courtesy by PicPay, an Amazon Echo device, a R$500 shop card at Amazon.com, an oven from the new Brastemp Gourmand line, a Tramontina kit of pots and knives, a scholarship at Estácio de Sá University and a reduced new version of the program trophy.

On 2 July, Band announced that filming had been suspended until 6 July 2020. Taping for the first stage was completed on 28 August 2020. Shooting for the final resumed in November 2020.

The final winner was awarded a R$25.000 prize, a house equipped by Amazon Echo smart devices, a Brastemp Inverse 4 refrigerator, a new kitchen equipped by Tramontina and the MasterChef trophy.

Architect Anna Paula Nico won the competition over app driver Hailton Arruda and systems analyst Heitor Cardoso on 29 December 2020.

== First stage ==
=== Top 184 ===
Episode 1 (14 July)
| Contestant | Age | Hometown | Occupation | Result |
|---|---|---|---|---|
| Hailton Arruda | 29 | São Paulo | App driver | Winner of Episode |
| Claudia Alves | 40 | Remanso | Administrative manager | Eliminated in Top 2 |
| Cecília Ramos† | 40 | São Paulo | Financial manager | Eliminated on Test 2 |
| Cilene Chioatto | 59 | Bragança Paulista | Farmer | Eliminated on Test 2 |
| Jessica Cinat | 29 | Osasco | Training manager | Eliminated on Test 2 |
| Saulo Sampaio | 27 | Serra | Marketing analyst | Eliminated on Test 2 |
| Ali Philipe Dourado | 26 | Rondon do Pará | Businessman | Eliminated on Test 1 |
| Thiago Medeiros | 35 | Itanhaém | Musician | Eliminated on Test 1 |

Episode 3 (28 July)
| Contestant | Age | Hometown | Occupation | Result |
|---|---|---|---|---|
| Alessandra Maria | 48 | Lambari | Secretary | Winner of Episode |
| Fernanda Demori | 29 | Marília | Banking | Eliminated on Test 2 |
| Juliana Arraes | 36 | Passos | Underwear stylist | Eliminated on Test 2 |
| Renan Nagao | 28 | São Paulo | Marketing analyst | Eliminated on Test 2 |
| Sara Monique | 35 | Cosmópolis | Marketing manager | Eliminated on Test 1 |
| Pedro Henrique | 50 | São Paulo | Pharmaceutical | Eliminated on Test 1 |
| Tiago Vinicius | 28 | Osasco | Data analyst | Eliminated on Test 1 |
| Valter Galvão | 60 | São Paulo | Businessman | Eliminated on Test 1 |

Episode 5 (11 August)
| Contestant | Age | Hometown | Occupation | Result |
|---|---|---|---|---|
| Thiago Monteiro | 27 | Sorocaba | Advertiser | Winner of Episode |
| Danila Campanella | 24 | São Caetano do Sul | Architect & urban planner | Eliminated in Top 2 |
| Arley Silva | 27 | São Paulo | Religious culture teacher | Eliminated on Test 2 |
| Débora Buchrieser | 36 | Porto Alegre | Jeweler | Eliminated on Test 2 |
| Iraí Martins | 49 | Fortaleza | Administrator | Eliminated on Test 2 |
| Eduardo Mizuta | 37 | São Paulo | Civil police | Eliminated on Test 1 |
| Jéssica Pierre | 28 | Campinas | Advertiser | Eliminated on Test 1 |
| Sabrina Biekarck | 41 | São Paulo | Administrative manager | Eliminated on Test 1 |

Episode 7 (25 August)
| Contestant | Age | Hometown | Occupation | Result |
|---|---|---|---|---|
| Danielle Barbosa | 31 | Governador Valadares | Innovation manager | Winner of Episode |
| Andrew Bean | 53 | Beverley, UK | Autonomous | Eliminated in Top 2 |
| Camila Martins | 31 | Cascavel | Nutritionist | Eliminated on Test 2 |
| Mauricio Romão | 39 | São Paulo | Fishmonger | Eliminated on Test 2 |
| Amanda Chaves | 28 | Socorro | Academic consultant | Eliminated on Test 1 |
| Denis Honda | 32 | Presidente Prudente | Businessman | Eliminated on Test 1 |
| Patrick Bannwart | 31 | Campinas | Brewmaster | Eliminated on Test 1 |
| Tatiane Lemos | 46 | São Paulo | Housewife | Eliminated on Test 1 |

Episode 9 (8 September)
| Contestant | Age | Hometown | Occupation | Result |
|---|---|---|---|---|
| Edson Junior | 28 | Blumenau | Businessman & digital influencer | Winner of Episode |
| Gerson Steves | 59 | São Paulo | Theater & art history teacher | Eliminated in Top 2 |
| André Vieira | 21 | Santo André | Party decorator | Eliminated on Test 2 |
| Luciana Lorenzetti | 51 | Campinas | Housewife | Eliminated on Test 2 |
| Priscila Dias | 37 | Guarulhos | Nursing assistant | Eliminated on Test 2 |
| Renato Igor | 34 | São Paulo | Civil engineering assistant | Eliminated on Test 2 |
| Tatiana Meca | 22 | São Paulo | Architecture student | Eliminated on Test 1 |
| Vanderlane Martins | 30 | Malhada de Pedras | Manicure | Eliminated on Test 1 |

Episode 11 (22 September)
| Contestant | Age | Hometown | Occupation | Result |
|---|---|---|---|---|
| Claudio Assis | 49 | Taubaté | Advertiser | Winner of Episode |
| Ana Claudia Silva | 35 | Guarulhos | Teacher & businesswoman | Eliminated in Top 2 |
| Ângelo Henrique | 26 | Araçatuba | Director of operations | Eliminated on Test 2 |
| Aquiles Almeida | 19 | Carrancas | Logistics | Eliminated on Test 2 |
| Regiane Musa | 47 | São Paulo | Industrial designer | Eliminated on Test 2 |
| Anna Elisa Valadão | 30 | Rio Claro | Unemployed | Eliminated on Test 1 |
| Marcelle Tittz | 32 | São Paulo | Property manager | Eliminated on Test 1 |
| Mateus Ximenes | 27 | Sete Lagoas | Civil engineer | Eliminated on Test 1 |

Episode 13 (7 October)
| Contestant | Age | Hometown | Occupation | Result |
|---|---|---|---|---|
| Adriana Schmidt | 50 | Joinville | Housewife | Winner of Episode |
| Felipe Pierami | 27 | Jundiaí | Naval engineer | Eliminated in Top 2 |
| Marco Anarco | 56 | Santa Mariana | Stylist | Eliminated on Test 2 |
| Natalie Lacerda | 33 | São Paulo | Tax analyst | Eliminated on Test 2 |
| Rafael Henrique | 29 | São Paulo | Model | Eliminated on Test 2 |
| Beatriz Oliviera | 25 | Santo André | YouTuber | Eliminated on Test 1 |
| Maria Inês Pierami | 54 | Fartura | Dentist | Eliminated on Test 1 |
| Thiago Chodrawí | 35 | São Paulo | Advertiser | Eliminated on Test 1 |

Episode 15 (20 October)
| Contestant | Age | Hometown | Occupation | Result |
|---|---|---|---|---|
| Renata Martinez | 28 | São Paulo | Child development agent | Winner of Episode |
| Marcos Vinicius | 35 | São Paulo | Choreographer | Eliminated in Top 2 |
| Luiz Azevedo | 63 | Campinas | Businessman | Eliminated on Test 2 |
| Millena Marchesano | 28 | Rio de Janeiro | Banking | Eliminated on Test 2 |
| Pedro Baraldi | 23 | São Paulo | Student | Eliminated on Test 2 |
| Renan Lira | 31 | Belém | Retail manager | Eliminated on Test 2 |
| Janice de Sousa | 37 | Guarulhos | Motel manager | Eliminated on Test 1 |
| Juliana Silvestre | 39 | São Paulo | Housewife | Eliminated on Test 1 |

Episode 17 (3 November)
| Contestant | Age | Hometown | Occupation | Result |
|---|---|---|---|---|
| Lorayne Tinti | 33 | Catanduva | Nun & pedagogue | Winner of Episode |
| Rafaela Ferraz | 33 | Barra Bonita | Businesswoman | Eliminated in Top 2 |
| Camila Gonçalves | 28 | São Paulo | Digital marketing analyst | Eliminated on Test 2 |
| João Vítor Marcon | 21 | Laranjal Paulista | History student | Eliminated on Test 2 |
| Aylton Manuel | 26 | Luanda, Angola | Shop assistant & dancer | Eliminated on Test 1 |
| Luiz Nishi | 24 | Guarulhos | Medicine student | Eliminated on Test 1 |
| Marcio Silveira | 40 | Santos | Engineer | Eliminated on Test 1 |
| Mirelle Affonso | 48 | Mogi das Cruzes | Housewife | Eliminated on Test 1 |

Episode 19 (17 November)
| Contestant | Age | Hometown | Occupation | Result |
|---|---|---|---|---|
| Marina Lacerda | 19 | Santos | Student | Winner of Episode |
| Renan Bergamo | 32 | Águas de Lindóia | Airplane pilot | Eliminated in Top 2 |
| Renato Nogueira | 34 | Pindamonhangaba | Environmental engineer | Eliminated on Test 2 |
| Caroline Merone | 41 | Americana | English teacher & businesswoman | Eliminated on Test 1 |
| Diliagni Tellez | 41 | Santiago de Cuba, Cuba | Doctor | Eliminated on Test 1 |
| Mariana Volante | 30 | São Paulo | Nutritionist | Eliminated on Test 1 |
| Simone Raucci | 40 | Ivrea, Italy | Argentine tango dancer | Eliminated on Test 1 |
| Fernando Garcia | 41 | São Paulo | Radiology technician | Eliminated on Test 1 |

Episode 21 (1 December)
| Contestant | Age | Hometown | Occupation | Result |
|---|---|---|---|---|
| Luiz Carlos Jamal | 31 | São Paulo | Realtor | Winner of Episode |
| Eliane "Li Bombom" Cunha | 44 | São Paulo | Stylist | Eliminated in Top 2 |
| Josiane Lima | 28 | São Paulo | Wardrobe stylist | Eliminated on Test 2 |
| Gilson Tiago Costa | 33 | Belo Horizonte | Administrator | Eliminated on Test 2 |
| Ricardo França | 53 | São Caetano do Sul | Security manager | Eliminated on Test 2 |
| Wagner Nunes | 31 | Campo Mourão | Event promoter | Eliminated on Test 2 |
| Stephany Cristine | 22 | São Paulo | Artist & model | Eliminated on Test 1 |
| Tifanny Silva | 21 | Uberaba | Nutrition technician | Eliminated on Test 1 |

Episode 23 (15 December)
| Contestant | Age | Hometown | Occupation | Result |
|---|---|---|---|---|
| Rafaela Rissoli | 24 | Adamantina | Food photographer | Winner of Episode |
| Daniela Pandolfo | 44 | São Paulo | Personal organizer | Eliminated in Top 2 |
| Bruna Paz | 28 | São Paulo | Banking product analyst | Eliminated on Test 2 |
| Flávia Souza | 26 | Campinas | Businesswoman | Eliminated on Test 2 |
| Marcelo Lopes | 24 | São Caetano do Sul | Service analyst | Eliminated on Test 2 |
| Vinícius Cicco | 27 | Sorocaba | Civil engineer | Eliminated on Test 2 |
| Antonio Junior Videira | 43 | São Paulo | Theology teacher | Eliminated on Test 1 |
| Luciano Medeiros | 28 | Castanhal | Aquaculture technician | Eliminated on Test 1 |

Episode 2 (21 July)
| Contestant | Age | Hometown | Occupation | Result |
|---|---|---|---|---|
| Anna Paula Nico | 49 | São Bernardo do Campo | Architect | Winner of Episode |
| Eduardo Vicente | 29 | Niterói | Businessman | Eliminated on Test 2 |
| Fernanda Lee | 22 | Presidente Prudente | Businesswoman | Eliminated on Test 2 |
| Jordana Busse | 36 | Divinópolis | Ballet teacher | Eliminated on Test 2 |
| Paloma Angelo | 34 | Mogi das Cruzes | Pole dance dancer | Eliminated on Test 1 |
| Wesley Miranda | 27 | Salvador | Art director & DJ | Eliminated on Test 1 |
| Leonardo Gonçalves | 26 | Campos do Jordão | Safety | Eliminated on Test 1 |
| Rubens Pospi | 52 | São Bernardo do Campo | Account manager | Eliminated on Test 1 |

Episode 4 (4 August)
| Contestant | Age | Hometown | Occupation | Result |
|---|---|---|---|---|
| Paulo Henrique Shibata | 23 | Cafelândia | Student | Winner of Episode |
| Ana Paula Calvo | 37 | São Paulo | Housewife | Eliminated on Test 2 |
| Marcely Guedes | 45 | Carangola | Merchant | Eliminated on Test 2 |
| Renato Bueno | 38 | São Paulo | Journalist | Eliminated on Test 2 |
| Ana Carolina do Carmo | 27 | Marília | Civil servant | Eliminated on Test 1 |
| Artur Iura | 32 | São Paulo | Businessman & college teacher | Eliminated on Test 1 |
| Gabriela Regina | 27 | São Paulo | Investigation specialist | Eliminated on Test 1 |
| Marcos Leandro | 42 | Santos | Electric engineer | Eliminated on Test 1 |

Episode 6 (18 August)
| Contestant | Age | Hometown | Occupation | Result |
|---|---|---|---|---|
| Heitor Cardoso | 28 | Campinas | Systems analyst | Winner of Episode |
| Giovanna Gava | 25 | São Paulo | Economist | Eliminated on Test 2 |
| Gisele Camargos | 45 | São Paulo | Systems analyst | Eliminated on Test 2 |
| Joelma Batista | 33 | Presidente Venceslau | Civil servant & law student | Eliminated on Test 2 |
| Beatriz Silveira | 39 | Criciúma | Physical education teacher | Eliminated on Test 1 |
| Clodoaldo Santelo | 45 | Goioerê | Work safety technician | Eliminated on Test 1 |
| Mayara Lago | 33 | São Paulo | Saleswoman | Eliminated on Test 1 |
| Pedro Tarcitani | 18 | Santo André | Student | Eliminated on Test 1 |

Episode 8 (1 September)
| Contestant | Age | Hometown | Occupation | Result |
|---|---|---|---|---|
| Karoline Burunsizian | 37 | São Paulo | Captain of the military police | Winner of Episode |
| André Barreto | 43 | Fortaleza | Businessman | Eliminated in Top 2 |
| Amanda Dias | 31 | São Paulo | Biojewels designer | Eliminated on Test 2 |
| Ana Cavalieri | 26 | São Paulo | Designer & illustrator | Eliminated on Test 2 |
| Kefferson "Keff" Pinto | 30 | Alfredo Chaves | Architect | Eliminated on Test 2 |
| Teresa Cristina | 39 | Salvador | Costume designer | Eliminated on Test 1 |
| Sidney Costa | 51 | São José dos Campos | Pastor | Eliminated on Test 1 |
| Gabriel Pithon | 23 | São Paulo | Dentist | Eliminated on Test 1 |

Episode 10 (15 September)
| Contestant | Age | Hometown | Occupation | Result |
|---|---|---|---|---|
| Salvador Cordovil | 58 | Taubaté | Company administrator | Winner of Episode |
| Pâmela Ferreira | 33 | Belém | International relations graduated | Eliminated in Top 2 |
| Bruno Iago | 27 | Camaçari | Telemarketing attendant | Eliminated on Test 2 |
| Rosana de Castro | 55 | Fortaleza | Housewife | Eliminated on Test 2 |
| Gabriel Lopes | 32 | Teixeira de Freitas | Cardiologist | Eliminated on Test 1 |
| Karina Martins | 33 | Peruíbe | College teacher | Eliminated on Test 1 |
| Roberta Alves | 39 | São Paulo | Teacher | Eliminated on Test 1 |
| Thalles Garbin | 28 | São Paulo | Photographer | Eliminated on Test 1 |

Episode 12 (29 September)
| Contestant | Age | Hometown | Occupation | Result |
|---|---|---|---|---|
| Fernanda Possi | 36 | São Paulo | Lawyer | Winner of Episode |
| Arthemus Savioli | 41 | Guaratinguetá | Advertiser | Eliminated on Test 2 |
| Francielle Soares | 29 | Estância | Work safety technician | Eliminated on Test 2 |
| Tryanda Verenna | 35 | São Paulo | Travel consultant | Eliminated on Test 2 |
| Almir Coutinho | 41 | Brasília | Systems analyst | Eliminated on Test 2 |
| Luiz Aburad | 28 | São Paulo | Nutritionist & medical affairs coordinator | Eliminated on Test 2 |
| Márcia Zampieri | 52 | Curitiba | Businesswoman | Eliminated on Test 2 |
| Margarida Arcebispo | 71 | Manhumirim | Retired | Eliminated on Test 2 |

Episode 14 (13 October)
| Contestant | Age | Hometown | Occupation | Result |
|---|---|---|---|---|
| Lucas Cicolin | 30 | Limeira | Production engineer | Winner of Episode |
| Yulia Lee | 46 | Seoul, South Korea | Housewife | Eliminated in Top 2 |
| Wilker Branco | 18 | Vitória da Conquista | Market assistant | Eliminated on Test 2 |
| Fábio Oliveira | 37 | São Paulo | Technical department manager | Eliminated on Test 2 |
| Jessica Aronis | 30 | São Paulo | Model | Eliminated on Test 2 |
| Marcela Zinsly | 40 | Piracicaba | Advertiser | Eliminated on Test 2 |
| Guilherme Arap | 18 | São Paulo | Chemical engineering student | Eliminated on Test 1 |
| Priscila Teló | 30 | Assis | Housewife | Eliminated on Test 1 |

Episode 16 (27 October)
| Contestant | Age | Hometown | Occupation | Result |
|---|---|---|---|---|
| Dayanna Ferreira | 33 | Jundiaí | Housewife | Winner of Episode |
| Alison Pereira | 30 | Suzano | Journalist | Eliminated on Test 2 |
| Ailton Barros | 33 | Suzano | Actor | Eliminated on Test 2 |
| André Miyashita | 28 | Araçatuba | Agronomist engineer | Eliminated on Test 2 |
| Fábio Buarque | 44 | São Paulo | Commercial assistant | Eliminated on Test 2 |
| Jéssica Freitas | 31 | Diadema | Sommelier | Eliminated on Test 2 |
| Marilena Lessa | 59 | Livramento | Nurse | Eliminated on Test 1 |
| Raquel Vallerini | 36 | Piracicaba | Artist | Eliminated on Test 1 |

Episode 18 (10 November)
| Contestant | Age | Hometown | Occupation | Result |
|---|---|---|---|---|
| Laura Barbosa | 22 | Ribeirão Preto | Ballet dancer | Winner of Episode |
| André Villalba | 27 | Cotia | Forest engineer | Eliminated on Test 2 |
| Camila Bomfim | 31 | Santos | Nursing technician | Eliminated on Test 2 |
| Natan Santiago | 29 | São Paulo | Marketing student | Eliminated on Test 2 |
| Pablo Árias | 40 | São Paulo | Travel agent | Eliminated on Test 1 |
| Hendrick Karg | 34 | São Paulo | Forensics expert | Eliminated on Test 1 |
| Priscilla Khayat | 44 | São Paulo | Model | Eliminated on Test 1 |
| Vilma Warner | 69 | São Paulo | Actress | Eliminated on Test 1 |

Episode 20 (24 November)
| Contestant | Age | Hometown | Occupation | Result |
|---|---|---|---|---|
| Luiz Henrique | 32 | Santa Rita | Surgical supplies buyer | Winner of Episode |
| Nayara Bonin | 34 | Montes Claros | Housewife | Eliminated in Top 2 |
| Ivana Tosi | 48 | Rio de Janeiro | School van driver | Eliminated on Test 2 |
| Daiana Baltor | 33 | São Paulo | Marketing manager | Eliminated on Test 1 |
| Kaio Chahad | 34 | São Paulo | Hospital architect | Eliminated on Test 1 |
| Marcela Saravy | 29 | Arapongas | Stylist | Eliminated on Test 1 |
| Pedro Gebert | 18 | Jundiaí | Student | Eliminated on Test 1 |
| Ricardo Freitas | 42 | São Paulo | Salesman | Eliminated on Test 1 |

Episode 22 (8 December)
| Contestant | Age | Hometown | Occupation | Result |
|---|---|---|---|---|
| Ronaldo Marchel | 38 | São Paulo | Marketing engineer | Winner of Episode |
| Marcelo Carvalheiro | 47 | São Paulo | Software developer | Eliminated in Top 2 |
| Marilaura Deboni | 30 | La Paloma, Paraguay | Housewife | Eliminated on Test 2 |
| Patrícia Hopf | 39 | São Paulo | Company administrator | Eliminated on Test 2 |
| Alex Porto | 30 | Jundiaí | Sales executive | Eliminated on Test 1 |
| Giovanna Krausz | 22 | São Paulo | Architecture student | Eliminated on Test 1 |
| Marco Tomei | 38 | São Paulo | Lawyer | Eliminated on Test 1 |
| Selma Barbosa | 47 | Francisco Alves | Pedagogue | Eliminated on Test 1 |

Reinstation Challenge (22 December)
| Contestant | Age | Hometown | Original Episode | Result |
|---|---|---|---|---|
| Danila Campanella | 24 | São Caetano do Sul | 5 | Winner of Episode |
| Renan Nagao | 28 | São Paulo | 3 | Eliminated in Top 2 |
| Francielle Soares | 29 | Estância | 12 | Eliminated on Test 2 |
| João Vítor Marcon | 21 | Laranjal Paulista | 17 | Eliminated on Test 2 |
| Pablo Árias | 40 | São Paulo | 18 | Eliminated on Test 2 |
| Eliane "Li Bombom" Cunha | 44 | São Paulo | 21 | Eliminated on Test 1 |
| Cilene Chioatto | 59 | Bragança Paulista | 1 | Eliminated on Test 1 |
| Mauricio Romão | 39 | São Paulo | 7 | Eliminated on Test 1 |

== Elimination table (First stage) ==
=== Episodes 1–8 ===
| Episode | Place | Contestant | Test | |
| Episode | Place | Contestant | 1 | 2 |
|---|---|---|---|---|
| 1 | 1 | Hailton | IN | WINNER |
| 1 | 2 | Claudia | IN | TOP 2 |
| 1 | 3–6 | Cecília | HIGH | ELIM |
| 1 | 3–6 | Cilene | WIN | ELIM |
| 1 | 3–6 | Jessica C. | HIGH | ELIM |
| 1 | 3–6 | Saulo | TOP 2 | ELIM |
| 1 | 7–8 | Ali | ELIM | |
| 1 | 7–8 | Thiago Med. | ELIM | |
| 2 | 1 | Anna Paula N. | WIN | WINNER |
| 2 | 2–4 | Eduardo V. | IN | ELIM |
| 2 | 2–4 | Fernanda L. | TOP 2 | ELIM |
| 2 | 2–4 | Jordana | IN | ELIM |
| 2 | 5–6 | Paloma | ELIM | |
| 2 | 5–6 | Wesley | ELIM | |
| 2 | 7–8 | Leonardo | ELIM | |
| 2 | 7–8 | Rubens | ELIM | |
| 3 | 1 | Alessandra | IN | WINNER |
| 3 | 2–3 | Fernanda D. | IN | ELIM |
| 3 | 2–3 | Juliana A. | WIN | ELIM |
| 3 | 4 | Renan N. | TOP 2 | ELIM |
| 3 | 5 | Sara | ELIM | |
| 3 | 6–8 | Pedro H. | ELIM | |
| 3 | 6–8 | Tiago V. | ELIM | |
| 3 | 6–8 | Valter | ELIM | |
| 4 | 1 | Paulo | HIGH | WINNER |
| 4 | 2–4 | Ana Paula C. | HIGH | ELIM |
| 4 | 2–4 | Marcely | WIN | ELIM |
| 4 | 2–4 | Renato B. | HIGH | ELIM |
| 4 | 5–8 | Ana Carolina | ELIM | |
| 4 | 5–8 | Artur | ELIM | |
| 4 | 5–8 | Gabriela | ELIM | |
| 4 | 5–8 | Marcos L. | ELIM | |
| 5 | 1 | Thiago Mon. | WIN | WINNER |
| 5 | 2 | Danila | IN | TOP 2 |
| 5 | 3–5 | Arley | TOP 2 | ELIM |
| 5 | 3–5 | Débora | IN | ELIM |
| 5 | 3–5 | Iraí | IN | ELIM |
| 5 | 6–8 | Eduardo M. | ELIM | |
| 5 | 6–8 | Jéssica P. | ELIM | |
| 5 | 6–8 | Sabrina | ELIM | |
| 6 | 1 | Heitor | HIGH | WINNER |
| 6 | 2–4 | Giovanna G. | WIN | ELIM |
| 6 | 2–4 | Gisele | HIGH | ELIM |
| 6 | 2–4 | Joelma | HIGH | ELIM |
| 6 | 5–8 | Beatriz S. | ELIM | |
| 6 | 5–8 | Clodoaldo | ELIM | |
| 6 | 5–8 | Mayara | ELIM | |
| 6 | 5–8 | Pedro T. | ELIM | |
| 7 | 1 | Danielle | HIGH | WINNER |
| 7 | 2 | Andrew | WIN | TOP 2 |
| 7 | 3–4 | Camila M. | HIGH | ELIM |
| 7 | 3–4 | Mauricio | HIGH | ELIM |
| 7 | 5–8 | Amanda C. | ELIM | |
| 7 | 5–8 | Denis | ELIM | |
| 7 | 5–8 | Patrick | ELIM | |
| 7 | 5–8 | Tatiane | ELIM | |
| 8 | 1 | Karoline B. | IN | WINNER |
| 8 | 2 | André B. | TOP 2 | TOP 2 |
| 8 | 3–5 | Amanda D. | HIGH | ELIM |
| 8 | 3–5 | Ana | WIN | ELIM |
| 8 | 3–5 | Keff | IN | ELIM |
| 8 | 6 | Teresa | ELIM | |
| 8 | 7 | Sidney | ELIM | |
| 8 | 8 | Gabriel P. | ELIM | |

=== Episodes 9–16 ===
| Episode | Place | Contestant | Test | |
| Episode | Place | Contestant | 1 | 2 |
|---|---|---|---|---|
| 9 | 1 | Edson | HIGH | WINNER |
| 9 | 2 | Gerson | WIN | TOP 2 |
| 9 | 3–6 | André Vie. | HIGH | ELIM |
| 9 | 3–6 | Luciana | IN | ELIM |
| 9 | 3–6 | Priscila D. | IN | ELIM |
| 9 | 3–6 | Renato I. | IN | ELIM |
| 9 | 7–8 | Tatiana | ELIM | |
| 9 | 7–8 | Vanderlane | ELIM | |
| 10 | 1 | Salvador | HIGH | WINNER |
| 10 | 2 | Pâmela | HIGH | TOP 2 |
| 10 | 3–4 | Bruno | HIGH | ELIM |
| 10 | 3–4 | Rosana | WIN | ELIM |
| 10 | 5–8 | Gabriel L. | ELIM | |
| 10 | 5–8 | Karina | ELIM | |
| 10 | 5–8 | Roberta | ELIM | |
| 10 | 5–8 | Thalles | ELIM | |
| 11 | 1 | Claudio | TOP 2 | WINNER |
| 11 | 2 | Ana Claudia | IN | TOP 2 |
| 11 | 3–5 | Ângelo | IN | ELIM |
| 11 | 3–5 | Aquiles | IN | ELIM |
| 11 | 3–5 | Regiane | WIN | ELIM |
| 11 | 6–8 | Anna Elisa | ELIM | |
| 11 | 6–8 | Marcelle | ELIM | |
| 11 | 6–8 | Mateus | ELIM | |
| 12 | 1 | Fernanda P. | HIGH | WINNER |
| 12 | 2–4 | Arthemus | WIN | ELIM |
| 12 | 2–4 | Francielle | HIGH | ELIM |
| 12 | 2–4 | Tryanda | HIGH | ELIM |
| 12 | 5–8 | Almir | HIGH | ELIM |
| 12 | 5–8 | Luiz Abu. | HIGH | ELIM |
| 12 | 5–8 | Márcia | HIGH | ELIM |
| 12 | 5–8 | Margarida | HIGH | ELIM |
| 13 | 1 | Adriana | WIN | WINNER |
| 13 | 2 | Felipe | IN | TOP 2 |
| 13 | 3–5 | Marco A. | HIGH | ELIM |
| 13 | 3–5 | Natalie | IN | ELIM |
| 13 | 3–5 | Rafael | HIGH | ELIM |
| 13 | 6–8 | Beatriz O. | ELIM | |
| 13 | 6–8 | Maria Inês | ELIM | |
| 13 | 6–8 | Thiago C. | ELIM | |
| 14 | 1 | Lucas | WIN | WINNER |
| 14 | 2 | Yulia | HIGH | TOP 2 |
| 14 | 3 | Wilker | HIGH | ELIM |
| 14 | 4–6 | Fábio O. | IN | ELIM |
| 14 | 4–6 | Jessica A. | IN | ELIM |
| 14 | 4–6 | Marcela Z. | IN | ELIM |
| 14 | 7–8 | Guilherme | ELIM | |
| 14 | 7–8 | Priscila T. | ELIM | |
| 15 | 1 | Renata | IN | WINNER |
| 15 | 2 | Marcos V. | HIGH | TOP 2 |
| 15 | 3–6 | Luiz Aze. | HIGH | ELIM |
| 15 | 3–6 | Millena | WIN | ELIM |
| 15 | 3–6 | Pedro B. | IN | ELIM |
| 15 | 3–6 | Renan L. | IN | ELIM |
| 15 | 7–8 | Janice | ELIM | |
| 15 | 7–8 | Juliana S. | ELIM | |
| 16 | 1 | Dayanna F. | HIGH | WINNER |
| 16 | 2–6 | Alison | HIGH | ELIM |
| 16 | 2–6 | Ailton B. | HIGH | ELIM |
| 16 | 2–6 | André M. | HIGH | ELIM |
| 16 | 2–6 | Fábio B. | HIGH | ELIM |
| 16 | 2–6 | Jéssica F. | WIN | ELIM |
| 16 | 7 | Marilena | ELIM | |
| 16 | 8 | Raquel | ELIM | |

=== Episodes 17–24 ===
| Episode | Place | Contestant | Test | |
| Episode | Place | Contestant | 1 | 2 |
|---|---|---|---|---|
| 17 | 1 | Lorayne | HIGH | WINNER |
| 17 | 2 | Rafaela F. | HIGH | TOP 2 |
| 17 | 3 | Camila G. | HIGH | ELIM |
| 17 | 4 | João Vítor | WIN | ELIM |
| 17 | 5–8 | Aylton M. | ELIM | |
| 17 | 5–8 | Luiz N. | ELIM | |
| 17 | 5–8 | Marcio | ELIM | |
| 17 | 5–8 | Mirelle | ELIM | |
| 18 | 1 | Laura | IN | WINNER |
| 18 | 2–4 | André Vil. | HIGH | TOP 2 |
| 18 | 2–4 | Camila B. | WIN | ELIM |
| 18 | 2–4 | Natan | HIGH | ELIM |
| 18 | 5 | Pablo | ELIM | |
| 18 | 6–8 | Hendrick | ELIM | |
| 18 | 6–8 | Priscilla K. | ELIM | |
| 18 | 6–8 | Vilma | ELIM | |
| 19 | 1 | Marina | IN | WINNER |
| 19 | 2 | Renan B. | HIGH | TOP 2 |
| 19 | 3 | Renato N. | WIN | ELIM |
| 19 | 4–7 | Caroline M. | ELIM | |
| 19 | 4–7 | Diliagni | ELIM | |
| 19 | 4–7 | Mariana | ELIM | |
| 19 | 4–7 | Simone | ELIM | |
| 19 | 8 | Fernando | ELIM | |
| 20 | 1 | Luiz H. | WIN | WINNER |
| 20 | 2 | Nayara | HIGH | TOP 2 |
| 20 | 3 | Ivana | HIGH | ELIM |
| 20 | 4–8 | Daiana B. | ELIM | |
| 20 | 4–8 | Kaio | ELIM | |
| 20 | 4–8 | Marcela S. | ELIM | |
| 20 | 4–8 | Pedro G. | ELIM | |
| 20 | 4–8 | Ricardo Fre. | ELIM | |
| 21 | 1 | Luiz C. | WIN | WINNER |
| 21 | 2 | Li Bombom | HIGH | TOP 2 |
| 21 | 3 | Josiane | HIGH | ELIM |
| 21 | 4–6 | Gilson Tiago | HIGH | ELIM |
| 21 | 4–6 | Ricardo Fra. | HIGH | ELIM |
| 21 | 4–6 | Wagner | HIGH | ELIM |
| 21 | 7–8 | Stephany | ELIM | |
| 21 | 7–8 | Tifanny | ELIM | |
| 22 | 1 | Ronaldo | HIGH | WINNER |
| 22 | 2 | Marcelo C. | HIGH | TOP 2 |
| 22 | 3–4 | Marilaura | HIGH | ELIM |
| 22 | 3–4 | Patrícia | WIN | ELIM |
| 22 | 5–8 | Alex | ELIM | |
| 22 | 5–8 | Giovanna K. | ELIM | |
| 22 | 5–8 | Marco T. | ELIM | |
| 22 | 5–8 | Selma | ELIM | |
| 23 | 1 | Rafaela R. | IN | WINNER |
| 23 | 2 | Daniela | IN | TOP 2 |
| 23 | 3–6 | Bruna | WIN | ELIM |
| 23 | 3–6 | Flávia | IN | ELIM |
| 23 | 3–6 | Marcelo L. | IN | ELIM |
| 23 | 3–6 | Vinícius | IN | ELIM |
| 23 | 7–8 | Antonio Junior | ELIM | |
| 23 | 7–8 | Luciano | ELIM | |
| 24 | 1 | Danila | HIGH | WINNER |
| 24 | 2 | Renan N. | HIGH | TOP 2 |
| 24 | 3–5 | Francielle | HIGH | ELIM |
| 24 | 3–5 | João Vítor | WIN | ELIM |
| 24 | 3–5 | Pablo | HIGH | ELIM |
| 24 | 6 | Li Bombom | ELIM | |
| 24 | 7–8 | Cilene | ELIM | |
| 24 | 7–8 | Mauricio | ELIM | |

Key

- Winner and advanced to the final
- Individual challenge winner
- Individual challenge top 2
- Individual challenge top entry
- Advanced
- Top 2 and eliminated
- Eliminated

== Final stage ==
=== Top 24 ===
Episode 25 (29 December)
| Contestant | Age | Hometown | Occupation | Winning Episode | Result |
|---|---|---|---|---|---|
| Anna Paula Nico | 49 | São Bernardo do Campo | Architect | 2 | Winner |
| Hailton Arruda | 29 | São Paulo | App driver | 1 | Runner-up |
| Heitor Cardoso | 28 | Campinas | Systems analyst | 6 | Runner-up |
| Fernanda Possi | 36 | São Paulo | Lawyer | 12 | Eliminated on Test 3 |
| Laura Barbosa | 22 | Ribeirão Preto | Ballet dancer | 18 | Eliminated on Test 3 |
| Marina Lacerda | 19 | Santos | Student | 19 | Eliminated on Test 3 |
| Dayanna Ferreira | 33 | Jundiaí | Housewife | 16 | Eliminated on Test 2 |
| Karoline Burunsizian | 37 | São Paulo | Captain of the military police | 8 | Eliminated on Test 2 |
| Luiz Henrique | 32 | Santa Rita | Surgical supplies buyer | 20 | Eliminated on Test 2 |
| Rafaela Rissoli | 24 | Adamantina | Food photographer | 23 | Eliminated on Test 2 |
| Danila Campanella | 24 | São Caetano do Sul | Architect & urban planner | 24 | Eliminated on Test 2 |
| Lucas Cicolin | 30 | Limeira | Production engineer | 14 | Eliminated on Test 2 |
| Paulo Henrique Shibata | 23 | Cafelândia | Student | 4 | Eliminated on Test 2 |
| Salvador Cordovil | 58 | Taubaté | Company administrator | 10 | Eliminated on Test 2 |
| Adriana Schmidt | 50 | Joinville | Housewife | 13 | Eliminated on Test 1 |
| Claudio Assis | 49 | Taubaté | Advertiser | 11 | Eliminated on Test 1 |
| Danielle Barbosa | 31 | Governador Valadares | Innovation manager | 7 | Eliminated on Test 1 |
| Renata Martinez | 28 | São Paulo | Child development agent | 15 | Eliminated on Test 1 |
| Ronaldo Marchel | 38 | São Paulo | Marketing engineer | 22 | Eliminated on Test 1 |
| Alessandra Maria | 48 | Lambari | Secretary | 3 | Eliminated on Test 1 |
| Edson Junior | 28 | Blumenau | Businessman & digital influencer | 9 | Eliminated on Test 1 |
| Lorayne Tinti | 33 | Catanduva | Nun & pedagogue | 17 | Eliminated on Test 1 |
| Thiago Monteiro | 27 | Sorocaba | Advertiser | 5 | Eliminated on Test 1 |
| Luiz Carlos Jamal | 31 | São Paulo | Realtor | 21 | Withdrew |

== Elimination table (Finale) ==
=== Episode 25 ===
| Episode | Place | Contestant | Test | | | Final |
| Episode | Place | Contestant | 1 | 2 | 3 | Final |
|---|---|---|---|---|---|---|
| 25 | 1 | Anna Paula | HIGH | | HIGH | WINNER |
| 25 | 2–3 | Hailton | | WIN | HIGH | RUNNER-UP |
| 25 | 2–3 | Heitor | | HIGH | HIGH | RUNNER-UP |
| 25 | 4–6 | Fernanda | WIN | | ELIM | |
| 25 | 4–6 | Laura | HIGH | | ELIM | |
| 25 | 4–6 | Marina | | HIGH | ELIM | |
| 25 | 7–10 | Dayanna | | ELIM | | |
| 25 | 7–10 | Karoline | | ELIM | | |
| 25 | 7–10 | Luiz H. | | ELIM | | |
| 25 | 7–10 | Rafaela | | ELIM | | |
| 25 | 11–14 | Danila | | ELIM | | |
| 25 | 11–14 | Lucas | | ELIM | | |
| 25 | 11–14 | Paulo | | ELIM | | |
| 25 | 11–14 | Salvador | | ELIM | | |
| 25 | 15–19 | Adriana | ELIM | | | |
| 25 | 15–19 | Claudio | ELIM | | | |
| 25 | 15–19 | Danielle | ELIM | | | |
| 25 | 15–19 | Renata | ELIM | | | |
| 25 | 15–19 | Ronaldo | ELIM | | | |
| 25 | 20–23 | Alessandra | ELIM | | | |
| 25 | 20–23 | Edson | ELIM | | | |
| 25 | 20–23 | Lorayne | ELIM | | | |
| 25 | 20–23 | Thiago | ELIM | | | |
| 25 | 24 | Luiz C. | WDR | | | |

Key

- Winner
- Runner-up
- Individual challenge winner
- Individual challenge top entry
- Eliminated
- Withdrew

== Ratings and reception ==
=== Brazilian ratings ===
All numbers are in points and provided by Kantar Ibope Media.

| Episode | Title | Air date | Timeslot (BRT) | SP viewers (in points) | BR viewers (in points) | Source |
|---|---|---|---|---|---|---|
| 1 | First stage 1 | 14 July 2020 | Tuesday 10:45 p.m. | 4.4 | 3.3 | |
| 2 | First stage 2 | 21 July 2020 | Tuesday 10:45 p.m. | 3.8 | 3.0 | |
| 3 | First stage 3 | 28 July 2020 | Tuesday 10:45 p.m. | 3.9 | 3.1 | |
| 4 | First stage 4 | 4 August 2020 | Tuesday 10:45 p.m. | 3.7 | 2.6 | |
| 5 | First stage 5 | 11 August 2020 | Tuesday 10:45 p.m. | 3.8 | 2.8 | |
| 6 | First stage 6 | 18 August 2020 | Tuesday 10:45 p.m. | 3.7 | 3.0 | |
| 7 | First stage 7 | 25 August 2020 | Tuesday 10:45 p.m. | 4.1 | 3.2 | |
| 8 | First stage 8 | 1 September 2020 | Tuesday 10:45 p.m. | 3.7 | 3.0 | |
| 9 | First stage 9 | 8 September 2020 | Tuesday 10:45 p.m. | 2.4 | 2.1 | |
| 10 | First stage 10 | 15 September 2020 | Tuesday 10:45 p.m. | 2.7 | 2.3 | |
| 11 | First stage 11 | 22 September 2020 | Tuesday 10:45 p.m. | 3.4 | 2.5 | |
| 12 | First stage 12 | 29 September 2020 | Tuesday 10:45 p.m. | 3.0 | 2.3 | |
| 13 | First stage 13 | 7 October 2020 | Wednesday 10:45 p.m. | 2.7 | 1.9 | |
| 14 | First stage 14 | 13 October 2020 | Tuesday 10:45 p.m. | 1.9 | 1.7 | |
| 15 | First stage 15 | 20 October 2020 | Tuesday 10:45 p.m. | 1.8 | Outside top 10 | |
| 16 | First stage 16 | 27 October 2020 | Tuesday 10:45 p.m. | 1.9 | Outside top 10 | |
| 17 | First stage 17 | 3 November 2020 | Tuesday 10:45 p.m. | 1.7 | Outside top 10 | |
| 18 | First stage 18 | 10 November 2020 | Tuesday 10:45 p.m. | 1.7 | Outside top 10 | |
| 19 | First stage 19 | 17 November 2020 | Tuesday 10:45 p.m. | 1.8 | Outside top 10 | |
| 20 | First stage 20 | 24 November 2020 | Tuesday 10:45 p.m. | 1.6 | Outside top 10 | |
| 21 | First stage 21 | 1 December 2020 | Tuesday 10:45 p.m. | 1.8 | Outside top 10 | |
| 22 | First stage 22 | 8 December 2020 | Tuesday 10:45 p.m. | 1.7 | Outside top 10 | |
| 23 | First stage 23 | 15 December 2020 | Tuesday 10:45 p.m. | 2.2 | 1.4 | |
| 24 | Reinstation challenge | 22 December 2020 | Tuesday 10:45 p.m. | 1.9 | Outside top 10 | |
| 25 | Winner announced | 29 December 2020 | Tuesday 10:45 p.m. | 2.2 | Outside top 10 | |

- In 2020, each point represents 260.558 households in 15 market cities in Brazil (74.987 households in São Paulo).
