= MasterChef + (Brazilian TV series) =

- Genre: Cooking
- Presented by: Ana Paula Padrão
- Judges: Érick Jacquin; Helena Rizzo; Henrique Fogaça
- Country of origin: Brazil
- Original language: Portuguese
- No. of seasons: 2
- No. of episodes: 11

Production
- Producers: Eyeworks; Shine International
- Running time: 150 minutes

Original release
- Network: Band
- Release: November 15, 2022 – December 26, 2023

Related
- MasterChef; MasterChef Junior; MasterChef Profissionais; MasterChef: A Revanche; MasterChef Confeitaria; MasterChef Creators; MasterChef Celebridades

MasterChef + is a Brazilian cooking competition television series. The series premiered on Tuesday, November 15, 2022 at 10:45 p.m. (BRT / AMT) on Band.

== Format ==
The difference with this version is that only contestants over 60 years old can participate. The winners receives a R$15.000 cash prize and the MasterChef + trophy.

== Series overview ==
=== Season chronology ===
Season	Winners		Runners-up		Judge 1	Judge 2	Judge 3
1	Astro Ribeiro	Pietro Coccaro	Nadja Celina	Sérgio Ferreira	Henrique Fogaça	Helena Rizzo	Erick Jacquin
2	Eduardo de Mingo	Maria do Carmo Prado	Cida Cabral	Mônica Divina	Henrique Fogaça	Helena Rizzo	Erick Jacquin

== Ratings and reception ==
Season	Timeslot (BRT)	Premiered		Ended		TV season	SP viewers (in points)	Source
Season	Timeslot (BRT)	Date	Viewers (in points)	Date	Viewers (in points)	TV season	SP viewers (in points)	Source
1	Tuesday 10:45 p.m.	November 15, 2022	1.8	December 13, 2022	1.7	2022–23	1.86	
2	Tuesday 10:45 p.m.	November 21, 2023	1.1	December 26, 2023	2.0	2023–24	1.40	

- Each point represents a specific number of households in São Paulo.
  - 2022: 74.666 households.
  - 2023: 76.953 households.
