= MasterChef (Brazilian TV series) season 4 =

MasterChef
- Season 4
- Presented by: Ana Paula Padrão
- Judges: Érick Jacquin; Paola Carosella; Henrique Fogaça
- No. of contestants: 21
- Winner: Michele
- Runner-up: Deborah
- No. of episodes: 25

Release
- Original network: Band
- Original release: March 7 – August 22, 2017

Season chronology
- ← Previous; Season 3 Next → Season 5

The fourth season of the Brazilian competitive reality television series MasterChef premiered on March 7, 2017, at 10:30 p.m. on Band.

The show celebrated its 100th episode (including MasterChef Junior, the Christmas's special MasterChef: O Desafio das Temporadas and MasterChef Profissionais) on Tuesday, July 11, 2017, during week 19.

The grand prize was R$200.000 (an increase over the first three seasons), a scholarship on Le Cordon Bleu in Paris, France, a year's supply on Carrefour worth R$1.000 per month, a Tramontina kit of pots, knives, barbecue and small home appliances by Breville and the MasterChef trophy. A scholarship on Le Cordon Bleu in Ottawa, Canada and a year's supply on Carrefour worth R$1.000 per month was awarded to the runner-up.

Commercial manager Michele Crispim won the competition over administrator Deborah Werneck on August 22, 2017. This was the second season of MasterChef Brasil to featured an all female final two, with Michele also being the first afro-Brazilian contestant to win the show.

== Contestants ==
=== Top 21 ===
Contestant	Age	Hometown	Occupation	Result	Winnings	Finish
Michele Crispim	27	Palhoça	Commercial manager	Winner on August 22	10	1st
Deborah Werneck	30	Rio de Janeiro	Administrator	Runner-up on August 22	10	2nd
Valter Herzmann	40	Florianópolis	Events producer	Eliminated on August 15	10	3rd
Victor Vieira	34	Vitória	Marketing director	Eliminated on August 8	6	4th
Leonardo Santos	22	Ribeirão Preto	Adman	Eliminated on August 1	5	5th
Mirian Cobre	57	São Paulo	Dentist surgeon	Eliminated on July 25	5	6th
Vitor Buorguignon	26	Curitiba	Businessman & singer	Eliminated on July 18	6	7th
Fabrizio Barata	39	Salvador	Adman	Eliminated on July 11	8	8th
Ana Luiza Teixeira	27	Chapecó	Zootechnical student	Eliminated on July 4	8	9th
Aderlize Martins	38	Porto Alegre	Businesswoman	Eliminated on June 27	6	10th
Yukontorn "Yuko" Tappabutt	31	Suphan Buri, Thailand	Language teacher & YouTuber	Eliminated on June 20	0	11th
Fernando Ferreira	30	São Paulo	Personal trainer	Eliminated on June 13	5	12th
Taise Spolti	27	Taquara	Personal trainer	Eliminated on June 6	2	13th
Nayane Barreto	26	Brasília	Lawyer	Eliminated on May 30	4	14th
Nayane Barreto	26	Brasília	Lawyer	Eliminated on May 23	4	Returned on May 30
Vitor Buorguignon	26	Curitiba	Businessman & singer	Eliminated on May 16	2	Returned on May 30
Douglas Holler	25	Ivoti	Tannery designer	Eliminated on May 9	3	15th
Caroline Martins	31	Barretos	Nuclear energy researcher	Eliminated on May 2	0	16th
Abel Chang	31	Asunción, Paraguay	Marketing director	Eliminated on April 25	3	17th
Natalia Clementin	31	São José do Rio Preto	Journalist & blogger	Eliminated on April 18	0	18th
Roger Fernandes†	26	Porto Alegre	Events producer	Eliminated on April 11	1	19th
Luciana Braga	35	Belo Horizonte	Communication director	Eliminated on April 4	0	20th
Bruno Viotto	33	Campinas	Supervisor controllership	Eliminated on March 28	0	21st

== Elimination table ==
Place	Contestant	Episode																																			
Place	Contestant	4		5	6		7	8		9	10		11	12^{^{1}}		13		14		15	16^{^{2}}		17^{^{3}}	18		19	20		21		22		23		24		25
1	Michele	IN	HIGH	WIN	HIGH	IMM	WIN	IN	LOW	LOW	IN	LOW	WIN	IN	HIGH		IMM	IN	HIGH	LOW	LOW	HIGH	WIN	HIGH	WIN	PT	IN	HIGH	HIGH	IMM	IN	WIN	HIGH	WIN	HIGH	WIN	WINNER
2	Deborah	IN	IN	LOW	IN	WIN	NPT	HIGH	WIN	WIN	IN	HIGH	PT	WIN	IMM		IMM	HIGH	IMM	WIN	LOW	LOW	WIN	IN	LOW	WIN	WIN	IMM	IN	WIN	IN	LOW	IN	LOW	WIN	IMM	RUNNER-UP
3	Valter	IN	IN	WIN	IN	IN	WIN	HIGH	HIGH	WIN	IN	WIN	WIN	HIGH	IMM		IMM	IN	WIN	WIN	LOW	HIGH	LOW	IN	IN	WIN	HIGH	IMM	WIN	IMM	IN	LOW	WIN	IMM	HIGH	ELIM	
4	Victor V.	IN	IN	WIN	IN	HIGH	WIN	IN	IN	WIN	IN	IN	HIGH	HIGH	IMM		IMM	IN	HIGH	PT	HIGH	IMM	PT	WIN	IMM	WIN	LOW	HIGH	IN	HIGH	WIN	IMM	IN	ELIM			
5	Leonardo	WIN	IMM	PT	HIGH	IMM	PT	IN	IN	LOW	HIGH	IMM	WIN	IN	IN		IMM	WIN	IMM	WIN	HIGH	IMM	LOW	IN	HIGH	LOW	IN	WIN	IN	LOW	IN	ELIM					
6	Mirian	HIGH	IMM	NPT	IN	HIGH	HIGH	IN	IN	PT	LOW	LOW	WIN	LOW	IN		IMM	IN	HIGH	WIN	IN	WIN	PT	WIN	IMM	WIN	IN	LOW	IN	ELIM							
7	Vitor B.	HIGH	IMM	PT	IN	LOW	PT	WIN	IMM	WIN	IN	IN	ELIM			RET	LOW	IN	LOW	WIN	WIN	IMM	WIN	HIGH	IN	WIN	LOW	ELIM									
8	Fabrizio	IN	WIN	WIN	IN	IN	WIN	IN	LOW	PT	LOW	HIGH	PT	LOW	IN		WIN	WIN	IMM	WIN	IN	HIGH	WIN	WIN	IMM	ELIM											
9	Ana Luiza	IN	HIGH	WIN	IN	IN	WIN	WIN	IMM	WIN	WIN	IMM	WIN	IN	WIN		IMM	IN	IN	PT	HIGH	IMM	WIN	HIGH	ELIM												
10	Aderlize	IN	LOW	WIN	HIGH	IMM	WIN	IN	HIGH	WIN	HIGH	IMM	WIN	IN	WIN		IMM	HIGH	IMM	WIN	IN	LOW	ELIM														
11	Yuko	HIGH	IMM	PT	IN	HIGH	LOW	IN	HIGH	PT	HIGH	IMM	LOW	IN	HIGH		IMM	IN	LOW	LOW	IN	ELIM															
12	Fernando	IN	LOW	WIN	IN	IN	WIN	IN	IN	WIN	IN	IN	WIN	LOW	IN		IMM	WIN	IMM	ELIM																	
13	Taise	LOW	IN	PT	LOW	IN	LOW	HIGH	LOW	PT	IN	IN	WIN	IN	LOW		WIN	IN	ELIM																		
14	Nayane	LOW	LOW	WIN	HIGH	IMM	WIN	WIN	IMM	WIN	IN	IN	PT	IN	ELIM	RET	ELIM																				
15	Douglas	IN	IN	WIN	IN	HIGH	WIN	IN	HIGH	WIN	LOW	ELIM																									
16	Caroline	LOW	IN	NPT	IN	LOW	PT	IN	IN	ELIM																											
17	Abel	IN	IN	WIN	WIN	IMM	WIN	IN	ELIM																												
18	Natalia	HIGH	IMM	LOW	LOW	IN	ELIM																														
19	Roger	IN	IN	WIN	LOW	ELIM																															
20	Luciana	IN	HIGH	ELIM																																	
21	Bruno	IN	ELIM																																		

- ^Note 1 : Deborah won the Mystery Box challenge and advanced directly to next week, alongside Valter and Victor V. who were the challenge's top entries. Fabrizio, Fernando and Mirian were selected as the bottom entries and were not eligible to compete in the mini-challenge where the winner would guarantee immunity. Aderlize won the challenge and also advanced, leaving nine contestants to compete in the Elimination Test.
- ^Note 2 : Vitor B. won the Mystery Box challenge and advanced directly to next week, alongside Ana Luiza, Leonardo and Victor V. who were the challenge's top entries. Elimination Test's first round winner Mirian and top entries Fabrizio, Michele and Valter also advanced, leaving Aderlize, Deborah and Yuko in the bottom three. Deborah won the second and final round, while Yuko was eliminated over Aderlize.
- ^Note 3 : Fabrizio won the first round of the Pressure Test and advanced directly to next week, alongside Mirian and Victor V. who were the challenge's top entries, leaving Aderlize, Leornardo and Valter in the bottom three. Leornardo won the second and final round, while Aderlize was eliminated over Valter.

Key

Winner	Runner-up	Individual challenge winner
Team challenge winner	Team challenge loser (PT)	Individual challenge top entry
Immunity	Saved first	Saved last
Mystery Box bottom entry	Eliminated	Withdrew
Returned	Did not compete	

== Ratings and reception ==
=== Brazilian ratings ===
All numbers are in points and provided by Kantar Ibope Media.

Week	Title	Air Date	Timeslot (BRT)	SP viewers (in points)	Rank timeslot	BR viewers (in points)	Rank network	Source
1	Auditions 1	March 7, 2017	Tuesday 10:30 p.m.	5.0	4	4.0	2	
2	Auditions 2	March 14, 2017	Tuesday 10:30 p.m.	5.2	4	3.8	4	
3	Top 40 – Duels	March 21, 2017	Tuesday 10:30 p.m.	4.7	4	3.6	3	
4	Top 21	March 28, 2017	Tuesday 10:30 p.m.	4.4	4	3.5	3	
5	Top 20	April 4, 2017	Tuesday 10:30 p.m.	5.4	2	3.9	3	
6	Top 19	April 11, 2017	Tuesday 10:30 p.m.	5.3	4	3.9	2	
7	Top 18	April 18, 2017	Tuesday 10:30 p.m.	5.5	4	4.4	1	
8	Top 17	April 25, 2017	Tuesday 10:30 p.m.	6.4	3	4.8	1	
9	Top 16	May 2, 2017	Tuesday 10:30 p.m.	5.5	3	4.3	1	
10	Top 15	May 9, 2017	Tuesday 10:30 p.m.	5.9	4	4.5	1	
11	Top 14	May 16, 2017	Tuesday 10:30 p.m.	6.3	4	4.4	2	
12	Top 13	May 23, 2017	Tuesday 10:30 p.m.	6.1	4	4.9	1	
13	Top 14 Redux	May 30, 2017	Tuesday 10:30 p.m.	6.7	4	5.3	1	
14	Top 13 Redux	June 6, 2017	Tuesday 10:30 p.m.	6.0	4	4.8	1	
15	Top 12	June 13, 2017	Tuesday 10:30 p.m.	5.2	4	4.3	1	
16	Top 11	June 20, 2017	Tuesday 10:30 p.m.	7.0	3	5.2	1	
17	Top 10	June 27, 2017	Tuesday 10:30 p.m.	6.6	4	5.0	1	
18	Top 9	July 4, 2017	Tuesday 10:30 p.m.	6.2	3	5.0	1	
19	Top 8	July 11, 2017	Tuesday 10:30 p.m.	7.3	2	5.3	1	
20	Top 7	July 18, 2017	Tuesday 10:30 p.m.	7.1	3	5.2	1	
21	Top 6	July 25, 2017	Tuesday 10:30 p.m.	6.6	3	5.0	1	
22	Top 5	August 1, 2017	Tuesday 10:30 p.m.	7.1	3	5.3	1	
23	Top 4	August 8, 2017	Tuesday 10:30 p.m.	6.7	3	5.0	1	
24	Top 3	August 15, 2017	Tuesday 10:30 p.m.	6.5	3	5.4	1	
25	Season Finale	August 22, 2017	Tuesday 10:30 p.m.	8.1	2	6.3	1	

- In 2017, each point represents 245.700 households in 15 market cities in Brazil (70.500 households in São Paulo only)

Note: Episode 4 aired against the Brazil vs. Paraguay football match for the 2018 FIFA World Cup qualification.
