= MasterChef Confeitaria =

2024 Brazilian TV series or program

- Genre: Cooking; Baking
- Based on: Dessert Masters
- Presented by: Ana Paula Padrão
- Judges: Érick Jacquin; Helena Rizzo; Diego Lozano; Henrique Fogaça
- Narrated by: Bruna Thedy; Ana Paula Padrão
- Country of origin: Brazil
- Original language: Portuguese
- No. of seasons: 2
- No. of episodes: 20

Production
- Producer: Endemol Shine Brasil
- Running time: 120 minutes

Original release
- Network: Band
- Release: November 19, 2024 – present

Related
- MasterChef; MasterChef Junior; MasterChef Profissionais; MasterChef: A Revanche; MasterChef + MasterChef Creators; MasterChef Celebridades

MasterChef Confeitaria (English: MasterChef Confectionery) is a Brazilian cooking competition television series based on the format of the Australian series MasterChef: Dessert Masters. The series premiered on November 19, 2024, at 10:30 p.m. (BRT) on Band.

The first season was hosted by Ana Paula Padrão, who left the franchise following its conclusion. From the second season onwards, the show no longer featured a traditional host; her on-screen duties were instead jointly assumed by the judges. Actress Bruna Thedy, who had already replaced Padrão as narrator and voice-over artist in the twelfth season of MasterChef, continued in this role for this series.

The judging panel consists of Érick Jacquin, Helena Rizzo, and newcomer Diego Lozano, who makes his debut as the franchise's only pastry chef judge. Henrique Fogaça was also part of the original lineup but did not return for the second season due to family reasons and was not replaced.

== Format ==
MasterChef Confeitaria is a spin-off from the main MasterChef Brasil series, featuring professional pastry chefs competing in a series of dessert-focused challenges. The winner receives a R$300.000 cash prize, a special cookware set from Royal Prestige, R$50.000 in products from Camicado, a kitchen from Brastemp's Eclipse Collection line, and the MasterChef Confeitaria trophy.

== Series overview ==
=== Season chronology ===
| Season | Winner | Runner-up | Judge 1 | Judge 2 | Judge 3 | Judge 4 |
|---|---|---|---|---|---|---|
| 1 | Cesar Yukio | Luísa Jungblut | Diego Lozano | Helena Rizzo | Erick Jacquin | Henrique Fogaça |
| 2 | Leo Salles | Ramiro Bertassin | Diego Lozano | Helena Rizzo | Erick Jacquin | —N/a |

== Ratings and reception ==
| Season | Timeslot (BRT) | Premiered | | Ended | | TV season | SP viewers (in points) | Source |
| Season | Timeslot (BRT) | Date | Viewers (in points) | Date | Viewers (in points) | TV season | SP viewers (in points) | Source |
|---|---|---|---|---|---|---|---|---|
| 1 | Tuesday 10:30 p.m. Thursday 10:30 p.m. | November 19, 2024 | 1.2 | December 19, 2024 | 1.0 | 2024 | 1.37 | |
| 2 | Tuesday 10:30 p.m. | September 9, 2025 | 0.8 | November 11, 2025 | 1.2 | 2025 | 1.11 | |

- Each point represents a specific number of households in São Paulo.
  - 2024: 73.279 households.
  - 2025: 77.488 households.
