= MasterChef (Brazilian TV series) season 6 =

MasterChef
- Season 6
- Presented by: Ana Paula Padrão
- Judges: Érick Jacquin; Paola Carosella; Henrique Fogaça
- No. of contestants: 19
- Winner: Rodrigo
- Runner-up: Lorena
- No. of episodes: 22

Release
- Original network: Band
- Original release: March 24 – August 25, 2019

Season chronology
- ← Previous; Season 5 Next → Season 7

The sixth season of the Brazilian competitive reality television series MasterChef premiered on March 24, 2019 at 8:00 p.m. on Band.

The grand prize was R$250.000, a scholarship on Le Cordon Bleu in Paris, France, a year's supply on Carrefour worth R$1.000 per month, a complete kitchen of the new Brastemp Gourmand line, a Tramontina kit of pots, knives, barbecue and small home appliances by Breville, a tour to the Pasta World Championship 2019 in Paris, courtesy by Barilla and the MasterChef trophy.

A scholarship on Le Cordon Bleu in Ottawa, Canada and a year's supply on Carrefour worth R$1.000 per month was awarded to the runner-up. A scholarship on Le Cordon Bleu in São Paulo was awarded to Brazil's favorite contestant via an online vote on Band.com.

Environmental engineer Rodrigo Massoni won the competition over nurse Lorena Dayse on August 25, 2019. Haila Santuá received 84.18% of the public vote over the other sixteen eliminated contestants and won the special prize. This was the first and only season of MasterChef Brasil broadcast on Sunday nights.

== Contestants ==
=== Top 19 ===
Contestant	Age	Hometown	Occupation	Result	Winnings	Finish
Rodrigo Massoni	33	Osasco	Environmental engineer	Winner on August 25	9	1st
Lorena Dayse	35	Teresina	Nurse	Runner-up on August 25	11	2nd
Eduardo Richard	31	Curitiba	Lawyer	Eliminated on August 18	7	3rd
Juliana Nicoli	35	Guaratinguetá	Hospital administrator	Eliminated on August 11	8	4th
Haila Santuá	25	Jataí	Advertising	Eliminated on August 4	4	5th
Helton Oliveira	19	Jacutinga	Student	Eliminated on July 28	7	6th
Ecatharine Santos	30	Palmeiras	Pilates teacher	Eliminated on July 21	5	7th
Eduardo Mauad	29	Barretos	Doctor	Eliminated on July 14	5	8th
Fernando Consoni	37	Araras	Architect	Eliminated on July 7	4	9th
Janaina Caetano	38	São Bernardo do Campo	Tarot card reader	Eliminated on June 30	3	10th
Weverton Barreto	30	Araguari	Civil engineer	Eliminated on June 23	2	11th
André Boratto	42	Brasília	Public worker	Eliminated on June 9	4	12th
Helton Oliveira	19	Jacutinga	Student	Eliminated on May 26	4	Returned on June 16
Renan Corrêa	31	São Luís de Montes Belos	Economist	Eliminated on May 19	2	13th
Juliana Fraga	35	Florianópolis	Marketing analyst	Eliminated on May 12	0	14th
Natalia Jorge	27	Brasília	Public worker	Eliminated on May 5	1	15th
Marcus Lima	41	São Paulo	Dentist	Eliminated on April 28	1	16th
Rosana Gammaro	62	São Paulo	HR consultant	Eliminated on April 21	1	17th
Carlos Augusto	41	Boston, U.S.	IT analyst	Eliminated on April 14	0	18th
Imaculada Soares	47	São Paulo	Sales manager	Eliminated on April 7	0	19th

== Elimination table ==
Place	Contestant	Episode																															
Place	Contestant	3		4	5		6	7		8	9		10	11		12		13		14	15		16	17		18	19		20		21		22
1	Rodrigo	HIGH	IMM	WIN	IN	LOW	WIN	IN	IN	HIGH	HIGH	IMM	NPT	WIN	IMM			WIN	IMM	WIN	HIGH	IMM	WIN	IN	HIGH	WIN	IN	WIN	HIGH	IMM	HIGH	WIN	WINNER
2	Lorena	IN	IN	WIN	IN	IMM	WIN	IN	IMM	WIN	WIN	IMM	WIN	HIGH	IMM			IN	IN	LOW	WIN	IMM	HIGH	WIN	IMM	WIN	HIGH	HIGH	WIN	IMM	WIN	IMM	RUNNER-UP
3	Eduardo R.	IN	HIGH	WIN	IN	WIN	NPT	HIGH	IMM	WIN	LOW	IN	NPT	LOW	LOW			IN	HIGH	WIN	IN	HIGH	LOW	LOW	WIN	LOW	WIN	IMM	IN	WIN	HIGH	ELIM	
4	Juliana N.	IN	IMM	NPT	IN	IN	WIN	IN	WIN	WIN	HIGH	IMM	WIN	IN	IN			LOW	WIN	WIN	LOW	LOW	WIN	IN	LOW	WIN	HIGH	LOW	IN	ELIM			
5	Haila	IN	LOW	PT	LOW	IN	LOW	IN	IN	WIN	IN	LOW	LOW	LOW	HIGH			IN	HIGH	HIGH	IN	WIN	WIN	HIGH	IMM	WIN	IN	ELIM					
6	Helton	IN	LOW	WIN	WIN	IMM	NPT	WIN	IMM	WIN	IN	HIGH	ELIM			WIN	RET	LOW	WIN	LOW	IN	HIGH	WIN	LOW	LOW	ELIM							
7	Ecatharine	LOW	IN	HIGH	IN	IN	WIN	HIGH	IMM	LOW	HIGH	IMM	WIN	IN	WIN			HIGH	IMM	WIN	LOW	LOW	WIN	IN	ELIM								
8	Eduardo M.	LOW	IN	WIN	IN	HIGH	WIN	LOW	IN	WIN	IN	HIGH	WIN	IN	IN			HIGH	IMM	WIN	HIGH	IMM	ELIM										
9	Fernando	IN	IMM	LOW	HIGH	IMM	WIN	IN	IN	NPT	IN	WIN	WIN	HIGH	IMM			IN	LOW	WIN	LOW	ELIM											
10	Janaina	IN	WIN	WIN	IN	LOW	WIN	LOW	IN	LOW	IN	IN	HIGH	IN	LOW			IN	IN	ELIM													
11	Weverton	IN	IN	HIGH	IN	IN	WIN	IN	IN	HIGH	IN	LOW	WIN	IN	HIGH			IN	ELIM														
12	André	WIN	IMM	LOW	IN	IN	WIN	HIGH	IMM	WIN	LOW	IN	WIN	LOW	ELIM																		
13	Renan	IN	IN	WIN	HIGH	IMM	LOW	IN	LOW	WIN	LOW	ELIM																					
14	Juliana F.	IN	LOW	HIGH	IN	HIGH	HIGH	IN	HIGH	ELIM																							
15	Natalia	HIGH	IMM	WIN	IN	IMM	HIGH	LOW	ELIM																								
16	Marcus	HIGH	IMM	WIN	LOW	IN	ELIM																										
17	Rosana	IN	IN	WIN	LOW	ELIM																											
18	Carlos	IN	LOW	ELIM																													
19	Imaculada	LOW	ELIM																														

=== Key ===
- Winner
- Runner-up
- Individual challenge winner
- Individual challenge top entry
- Mystery Box bottom entry
- Team challenge winner
- Team challenge loser (PT)
- Immunity
- Immunity extra
- Saved first
- Saved last
- Eliminated
- Returned
- Did not compete

== Ratings and reception ==
=== Brazilian ratings ===
All numbers are in points and provided by Kantar Ibope Media.

Episode	Title	Air date	Timeslot (BRT)	SP viewers (in points)	BR viewers (in points)	Source
1	Top 44 – Duels (1)	March 24, 2019	Sunday 8:00 p.m.	4.1	2.7	
2	Top 44 – Duels (2)	March 31, 2019	Sunday 8:00 p.m.	3.7	2.5	
3	Top 19	April 7, 2019	Sunday 8:00 p.m.	3.2	2.6	
4	Top 18	April 14, 2019	Sunday 8:00 p.m.	2.7	2.2	
5	Top 17	April 21, 2019	Sunday 8:00 p.m.	3.9	2.7	
6	Top 16	April 28, 2019	Sunday 8:00 p.m.	3.2	Outside top 10	
7	Top 15	May 5, 2019	Sunday 8:00 p.m.	3.8	2.9	
8	Top 14	May 12, 2019	Sunday 8:00 p.m.	4.2	2.8	
9	Top 13	May 19, 2019	Sunday 8:00 p.m.	3.8	2.7	
10	Top 12	May 26, 2019	Sunday 8:00 p.m.	3.5	2.7	
11	Top 11	June 9, 2019	Sunday 8:00 p.m.	3.7	2.7	
12	Reinstation challenge	June 16, 2019	Sunday 8:00 p.m.	3.7	2.9	
13	Top 11 Redux	June 23, 2019	Sunday 8:00 p.m.	3.9	2.8	
14	Top 10	June 30, 2019	Sunday 8:00 p.m.	3.0	2.6	
15	Top 9	July 7, 2019	Sunday 8:00 p.m.	3.6	2.8	
16	Top 8	July 14, 2019	Sunday 8:00 p.m.	3.2	2.7	
17	Top 7	July 21, 2019	Sunday 8:00 p.m.	3.1	2.8	
18	Top 6	July 28, 2019	Sunday 8:00 p.m.	3.4	2.9	
19	Top 5	August 4, 2019	Sunday 10:00 p.m.	3.3	2.7	
20	Top 4	August 11, 2019	Sunday 8:00 p.m.	3.8	2.8	
21	Top 3	August 18, 2019	Sunday 8:00 p.m.	4.0	3.1	
22	Winner announced	August 25, 2019	Sunday 8:00 p.m.	4.4	3.8	

- In 2019, each point represents 254.892 households in 15 market cities in Brazil (73.015 households in São Paulo).
