= MasterChef (Brazilian TV series) season 1 =

MasterChef
- Season 1
- Presented by: Ana Paula Padrão
- Judges: Érick Jacquin; Paola Carosella; Henrique Fogaça
- No. of contestants: 16
- Winner: Elisa
- Runner-up: Helena
- No. of episodes: 17

Release
- Original network: Band
- Original release: September 2 – December 16, 2014

Season chronology
- Next → Season 2

The first season of the Brazilian competitive reality television series MasterChef premiered on 2 September 2014 at 10:30 p.m. on Band.

Executive producer Elisa Fernandes won the competition over chemical engineer Helena Manosso on 16 December 2014.

== Contestants ==
=== Top 48 ===
- The green contestants are the Top 16

Duels			Slogan
Sandra Rodrigues	Estefano Zaquini	Lucia Moreira	Chicken
Cecilia Padilha	Nicholas Sthën	Karin Attaubâi	Desserts
Jaime Conceiçao	Maria dôs Angeles Neto	Angelica Tajarin	Fish
Benvenida Arauca	Luiza Rodrigo	Sandra Matarazzo	Pasta
Belaissa Udata	Ruth Unsain	Shlomi Asaf	Brazilian food
Daniel Hortensio	Mohamad Hindi Neto	Fernando Quibelho	Pizza
Flavio Takemoto	Mario Poposauba	Arazely Santos	Sandwiches
Antony Rios	Elisa Fernandes	Valhery Ototo	Desserts
Luis Lima	Guilherme Salgueiro	Rod Basia	Rice
Thais Fernandes	Marli Rocha	Andre Pêsoud	Soup
Abigail Andrezinô	Lucio Manosso	Federico Fernández	Stew
Dario Perossio	Miguel dos Selis	Martin Casilli	Pork meat
Bianca Bertolaccini	Miranda Basco	Izabela Fernandes	Barbecue
Perla Martins	Helena Manosso	Brandon Seleis	Sauce
Isabella Britto	Joan Fauco	Elman Ortis	Teriyaki
Rosa Albeiro	Jamyly Monard	Hennan Hasaiba	Dips

Challenges

Episode	Task	Time
1	Avaliação com Consultores Culinários - Pacaembu	-
1	Prato e Finalização na Frente dos Jurados	45min
2	Prato e Finalização na Frente dos Jurados (continuação)	45min
2	Cortes de Cebola (Brunoise e Julienne)	-
2	Prato com 1 Ovo	30min
3	Caixa Misteriosa	1h
3	Comida de Boteco	1h
4	Prova em Equipe - Exército	2h
4	Arrozes	1h
5	Caixa Misteriosa Vegetariana	1h
5	Reprodução - Alex Atala	1h
6	Prova em Equipe - Casamento	2h
6	Massa Fresca Recheada	1h
7	Caixa Misteriosa - Chocolate	1h
7	Peixes e Frutos do Mar	1h15
8	Prova em Equipe - Hambúrguer	
8	Frango	1h
9	Moqueca (Repescagem)	
9	Aproveitamento de Sobras	1h
10	Prova em Equipe - Cozinha Profissional com Bassoleil	
10	Petit Gateau	45min
11	Caixa Misteriosa - Feijoada (em duplas)	1h30
11	Caranguejos	1h
12	Prova em Equipe - Hopi Hari	1h30
12	Ingredientes Favoritos dos Chefes	1h
13	Pratos da Infância	1h
13	Carne Bovina	45min
14	Prova em Equipe - Harmonização de Vinhos	
14	Prato Romântico	
15	Adivinhação de Ingredientes - Ensopado	-
15	Caixa Misteriosa - Região Norte	1h
15	Culinária Japonesa	-
16	Alta Gastronomia com Ingredientes Selecionados	1h
16	Miúdos Bovinos	1h
17	Peru de Natal (semifinal)	2h
17	Menu Completo	-

=== Top 16 ===
Contestant	Age	Hometown	Occupation	Result	Winnings	Finish
Elisa Fernandes	24	Ribeirão Preto	Executive producer	Winner on December 16	9	1st
Helena Manosso†	44	São Paulo	Chemical engineer	Runner-up on December 16	6	2nd
Luis Lima	31	Teresina	Legal analyst	Eliminated on December 16	4	3rd
Mohamad Hindi Neto	27	São Bernardo do Campo	Businessman	Eliminated on December 11	5	4th
Jaime Conceição	30	São Paulo	Teacher	Eliminated on December 9	5	5th
Cecilia Padilha	33	Rio de Janeiro	Business administrator	Eliminated on December 2	8	6th
Flavio Takemoto	29	São Paulo	Designer	Eliminated on November 25	4	7th
Jamyly Monard	22	Macapá	Student	Eliminated on November 18	5	8th
Estefano Zaquini	19	Santo André	Locksmith assistant	Eliminated on November 11	4	9th
Sandra Matarazzo	30	São Paulo	Blogger	Eliminated on November 4	1	10th
Martin Casilli	20	São Paulo	Student	Eliminated on October 28	2	11th
Lucio Manosso	47	São Paulo	Chemical engineer	Withdrew on October 21	1	12th
Bianca Bertolaccini	35	Mauá	Actress	Eliminated on October 15	1	13th
Isabella Britto	34	Vitória	Consultant	Eliminated on October 7	1	14th
Sandra Matarazzo	30	São Paulo	Blogger	Eliminated on September 30	0	Returned on October 28
Marli Rocha†	51	Juiz de Fora	Retired	Eliminated on September 23	0	15th
Shlomi Asaf	39	Rishon LeZion, Israel	App developer	Eliminated on September 16	0	16th

== Elimination table ==
Place	Contestant	Episode																							
Place	Contestant	3		4	5		6	7		8	9		10	11		12	13		14	15		16		17	
1	Elisa	IN	HIGH	WIN	IN	HIGH	WIN	LOW	LOW	HIGH		IN	HIGH	LOW	WIN	WIN	IN	HIGH	WIN	IN	WIN	IN	WIN	WIN	WINNER
2	Helena	IN	IN	WIN	LOW	IN	WIN	IN	HIGH	WIN		HIGH	LOW	HIGH	IN	WIN	IN	LOW	WIN	HIGH	LOW	WIN	IMM	LOW	RUNNER-UP
3	Luis	IN	HIGH	WIN	IN	IN	HIGT	IN	HIGH	LOW		LOW	LOW	WIN	IMM	LOW	IN	WIN	WIN	IN	LOW	HIGH	LOW	ELIM	
4	Mohamad	LOW	IN	WIN	LOW	LOW	LOW	HIGH	IMM	LOW		IN	WIN	LOW	IN	WIN	HIGH	IMM	WIN	WIN	IMM	IN	ELIM		
5	Jaime	LOW	IN	WIN	IN	HIGH	WIN	HIGH	IMM	WIN		IN	WIN	IN	HIGH	WIN	IN	HIGH	LOW	IN	ELIM				
6	Cecilia	WIN	IMM	WIN	HIGH	IMM	WIN	LOW	LOW	WIN		WIN	WIN	HIGH	LOW	WIN	WIN	IMM	ELIM						
7	Flavio	IN	IN	WIN	WIN	IMM	LOW	WIN	IMM	WIN		IN	WIN	IN	IN	LOW	IN	ELIM							
8	Jamyly	LOW	IN	WIN	IN	IN	WIN	LOW	IN	WIN		LOW	WIN	WIN	IMM	ELIM									
9	Estefano	IN	IN	WIN	IN	WIN	HIGH	IN	IN	WIN		HIGH	WIN	IN	ELIM										
10	Sandra	IN	LOW	HIGH	IN	ELIM					RET	LOW	ELIM												
11	Martin	HIGH	IMM	LOW	IN	IN	WIN	IN	IN	WIN		ELIM													
12	Lucio	IN	IN	PT	HIGH	IMM	NPT	IN	WIN	WDR															
13	Bianca	HIGH	IMM	PT	IN	IN	WIN	IN	ELIM																
14	Isabella	IN	WIN	PT	LOW	IN	ELIM																		
15	Marli		LOW	ELIM																					
16	Shlomi		ELIM																						

Key

Winner	Runner-up	Individual challenge winner
Team challenge winner	Team challenge loser (PT)	Individual challenge top 3
Immunity	Saved first	Saved last
Withdrew	Mystery Box bottom entry	Eliminated

== Ratings and reception ==
=== Brazilian ratings ===
All numbers are in points and provided by IBOPE.

Week	Episode	Air Date	Timeslot (BRT)	Viewers (in points)	Rank Timeslot	Source
1	Auditions 1	2 September 2014	Tuesday 10:30 p.m.	3.6	4	
2	Auditions 2	9 September 2014	Tuesday 10:30 p.m.	3.6	3	
3	Top 16	16 September 2014	Tuesday 10:30 p.m.	3.4	4	
4	Top 15	23 September 2014	Tuesday 10:30 p.m.	3.1	3	
5	Top 14	30 September 2014	Tuesday 10:30 p.m.	3.1	4	
6	Top 13	7 October 2014	Tuesday 10:30 p.m.	3.1	4	
7	Top 12	15 October 2014	Wednesday 10:30 p.m.	4.0	4	
8	Top 11	21 October 2014	Tuesday 10:30 p.m.	4.2	3	
9	Reinstation challenge & Top 11 Redux	28 October 2014	Tuesday 10:30 p.m.	4.3	4	
10	Top 10	4 November 2014	Tuesday 10:30 p.m.	4.9	4	
11	Top 9	11 November 2014	Tuesday 10:30 p.m.	4.2	4	
12	Top 8	18 November 2014	Tuesday 10:30 p.m.	4.7	3	
13	Top 7	25 November 2014	Tuesday 10:30 p.m.	5.6	4	
14	Top 6	2 December 2014	Tuesday 10:30 p.m.	5.5	4	
15	Top 5	9 December 2014	Tuesday 10:30 p.m.	5.3	3	
16	Top 4	11 December 2014	Thursday 10:30 p.m.	6.0	3	
17	Season Finale	16 December 2014	Tuesday 10:30 p.m.	7.8	1	

- In 2014, each point represents 65.000 households in São Paulo.

Note: Episode 7 aired on Wednesday, 15 October, due to the second round Presidential debate on Band on Tuesday, 14 October.
