= MasterChef Junior (Brazilian TV series) =

- Genre: Cooking
- Based on: Junior MasterChef
- Presented by: Ana Paula Padrão
- Judges: Paola Carosella; Érick Jacquin; Henrique Fogaça; Helena Rizzo
- Country of origin: Brazil
- Original language: Portuguese
- No. of seasons: 2
- No. of episodes: 13

Production
- Producers: Eyeworks; Shine International
- Running time: 150 minutes

Original release
- Network: Band
- Release: October 20, 2015 – December 29, 2022

Related
- MasterChef; MasterChef Profissionais; MasterChef: A Revanche; MasterChef + MasterChef Confeitaria; MasterChef Creators; MasterChef Celebridades

MasterChef Junior is a Brazilian cooking competition television series based on the format of the U.K. series Junior MasterChef. The series premiered on Tuesday, October 20, 2015 at 10:30 p.m. (BRT / AMT) on Band.

== Format ==
Children between the ages of 8 and 13 are eligible to apply for the series and two contestants are sent home per episode. The winner receives a R$20.000 cash prize, a trip for six to Disney World courtesy of Decolar.com, a 3-month cooking course with the three judges, a year's supply on Carrefour of R$1.000 per month, one small appliance kitchen package by Oster and the MasterChef Junior trophy.

== Series overview ==
=== Season chronology ===
Season	Winner	Runner-up	Judge 1	Judge 2	Judge 3
1	Lorenzo Ravioli	Lívia Lopes	Henrique Fogaça	Paola Carosella	Erick Jacquin
2	Larissa Krokoscz	Lucas Martins	Henrique Fogaça	Helena Rizzo	Erick Jacquin

== Ratings and reception ==
Season	Timeslot (BRT)	Premiered		Ended		TV season	SP viewers (in points)	Source
Season	Timeslot (BRT)	Date	Viewers (in points)	Date	Viewers (in points)	TV season	SP viewers (in points)	Source
1	Tuesday 10:30 p.m.	October 20, 2015	6.1	December 15, 2015	6.3	2015–16	5.68	
2	Tuesday 10:30 p.m. Thursday 10:30 p.m.	December 20, 2022	2.1	December 29, 2022	1.5	2022–23	1.82	

- Each point represents a specific number of households in São Paulo.
  - 2015: 67.000 households.
  - 2022: 74.666 households.

== Criticism and controversy ==
During the premiere night from season one, 12 year-old Valentina Schulz was subject of comments of sexual content on social media. The harassment around Valentina raised questions about underage exposure on TV, how to handle comments on social networks and how to explain to children subjects like pedophilia, bullying and many others.

The following day, Valentina's father told the press he did not allow his daughter to see this kind of feedback: "I had already named a person to take charge of her Twitter profile, because we were prepared for the harassment and the possible consequences, but we did not imagine finding freaks. Valentina has not been affected by that, since she only sees what we allow her to."
