= MasterChef (Brazilian TV series) season 2 =

MasterChef
- Season 2
- Presented by: Ana Paula Padrão
- Judges: Érick Jacquin; Paola Carosella; Henrique Fogaça
- No. of contestants: 18
- Winner: Izabel
- Runner-up: Raul
- No. of episodes: 18

Release
- Original network: Band
- Original release: 19 May – 15 September 2015

Season chronology
- ← Previous; Season 1 Next → Season 3

The second season of the Brazilian competitive reality television series MasterChef premiered on 19 May 2015 at 10:30 p.m. on Band.

Event producer Izabel Alvares won the competition over publicist Raul Lemos on 15 September 2015.

== Contestants ==
=== Top 18 ===
Contestant	Age	Hometown	Occupation	Result	Winnings	Finish
Izabel Alvares	31	Rio de Janeiro	Event producer	Winner on 15 September	9	1st
Raul Lemos	34	Santos	Publicist	Runner-Up on 15 September	5	2nd
Jiang Pu	26	Yongzhou, China	Unemployed	Eliminated on 8 September	7	3rd
Cristiano Oliveira	37	Porto Seguro	Traffic agent	Eliminated on 1 September	8	4th
Fernando Kawasaki	29	Parapuã	Publicist	Eliminated on 25 August	3	5th
Lucas Furtado	24	São Roque	Student	Eliminated on 18 August	6	6th
Sabrina Kanai	29	Rio de Janeiro	Microentrepreneur	Eliminated on 11 August	1	7th
Aritana Maroni	36	São Paulo	Business administrator	Eliminated on 4 August	2	8th
Marcos Baldassari	34	São Paulo	Business administrator	Eliminated on 28 July	3	9th
Carla Correia	52	São Paulo	Behavioral training consultant	Eliminated on 21 July	3	10th
Iranete Santana	47	Salvador	Housekeeper	Eliminated on 14 July	2	11th
Murilo de Oliveira	26	Londrina	Marketing analyst	Eliminated on 7 July	3	12th
Gustavo Bicalho	26	Belo Horizonte	Lawyer	Eliminated on 30 June	2	13th
Izabel Alvares	31	Rio de Janeiro	Event producer	Eliminated on 23 June	0	Returned on 14 July
Hamilton Carvalho	47	Distrito Federal	Police helicopter pilot	Eliminated on 16 June	0	14th
Rodrigo Serra	41	São Paulo	Lawyer	Eliminated on 9 June	0	15th
Larissa Douat	26	Araguari	International relations bachelor	Eliminated on 2 June	0	16th
Cássia Castro	18	Cuiabá	Student	Eliminated on 2 June	0	17th
Patrizia Martins	41	São Paulo	Plastic artist	Eliminated on 2 June	0	18th

== Elimination table ==
Place	Contestant	Episode																											
Place	Contestant	3			4	5		6	7		8	9			10	11		12	13		14			15		16		17	18
1	Izabel	HIGH		IMM	HIGH	HIGH	IMM	ELIM				RET	HIGH	IMM	WIN	WIN	IMM	LOW	WIN	IMM	NPT	WIN	IMM	IN	LOW	WIN	IMM	WIN	WINNER
2	Raul		IN	IMM	HIGH	IN	HIGH	WIN	IN	LOW	WIN		HIGH	IMM	WIN	HIGH	IMM	WIN	IN	IN	NPT	IN	PT	WIN	IMM	IN	PT	LOW	RUNNER-UP
3	Jiang		LOW	IN	WIN	LOW	HIGH	WIN	IN	HIGH	PT		HIGH	IMM	WIN	HIGH	IMM	WIN	IN	WIN	WIN	WIN	IMM	HIGH	IN	HIGH	LOW	ELIM	
4	Cristiano		IN	IMM	WIN	IN	WIN	WIN	WIN	IMM	WIN		IN	LOW	PT	IN	WIN	WIN	IN	IN	WIN	IMM	NPT	LOW	WIN	IN	ELIM		
5	Fernando		IN	IMM	WIN	IN	IMM	LOW	IN	WIN	NPT		WIN	IMM	NPT	WIN	IMM	PT	HIGH	LOW	NPT	IN	LOW	IN	ELIM				
6	Lucas		HIGH	IMM	WIN	HIGH	IMM	WIN	IN	HIGH	WIN		IN	LOW	WIN	LOW	LOW	WIN	LOW	LOW	WIN	IN	ELIM						
7	Sabrina		LOW	WIN	LOW	LOW	IN	LOW	HIGH	IMM	PT		IN	PT	NPT	IN	PT	PT	IN	ELIM									
8	Aritana	WIN		IMM	NPT	IN	LOW	WIN	LOW	IN	LOW		HIGH	IMM	LOW	LOW	PT	ELIM											
9	Marcos	LOW		LOW	WIN	LOW	IN	WIN	HIGH	IMM	WIN		IN	PT	LOW	IN	ELIM												
10	Carla	IN		IMM	WIN	IN	IN	PT	WIN	IMM	WIN		HIGH	IMM	ELIM														
11	Iranete		IN	IMM	LOW	WIN	IMM	LOW	IN	IN	WIN		IN	ELIM															
12	Murilo		WIN	IMM	WIN	IN	IN	WIN	LOW	LOW	ELIM																		
13	Gustavo	HIGH		IMM	WIN	IN	LOW	WIN	IN	ELIM																			
14	Hamilton	IN		IMM	PT	LOW	ELIM																						
15	Rodrigo	IN		IMM	ELIM																								
16	Larissa	LOW		ELIM																									
17	Cássia		ELIM																										
18	Patrizia	ELIM																											

Key

Winner	Runner-up	Individual challenge winner
Team challenge winner	Team challenge loser (PT)	Individual challenge top 3
Immunity	Saved first	Saved last
Immunity extra	Mystery Box bottom entry	Eliminated

== Ratings and reception ==
=== Brazilian ratings ===
All numbers are in points and provided by IBOPE.

Week	Episode	Air Date	Viewers (in points)	Rank Timeslot	Source
1	Auditions 1	19 May 2015	5.1	4	
2	Auditions 2	26 May 2015	4.8	4	
3	Top 18	2 June 2015	6.0	4	
4	Top 15	9 June 2015	6.0	4	
5	Top 14	16 June 2015	6.0	3	
6	Top 13	23 June 2015	6.1	3	
7	Top 12	30 June 2015	6.8	4	
8	Top 11	7 July 2015	7.0	3	
9	Top 11	14 July 2015	7.5	3	
10	Top 10	21 July 2015	7.2	2	
11	Top 9	28 July 2015	7.9	2	
12	Top 8	4 August 2015	7.4	2	
13	Top 7	11 August 2015	8.1	2	
14	Top 6	18 August 2015	8.8	2	
15	Top 5	25 August 2015	7.9	3	
16	Top 4	1 September 2015	8.2	2	
17	Top 3	8 September 2015	7.9	2	
18	Season Finale	15 September 2015	10.2	1	
