= MasterChef (Brazilian TV series) season 5 =

MasterChef
- Season 5
- Presented by: Ana Paula Padrão
- Judges: Érick Jacquin; Paola Carosella; Henrique Fogaça
- No. of contestants: 21
- Winner: Maria Antônia
- Runner-up: Hugo
- No. of episodes: 22

Release
- Original network: Band
- Original release: March 6 – July 31, 2018

Season chronology
- ← Previous; Season 4 Next → Season 6

The fifth season of the Brazilian competitive reality television series MasterChef premiered on March 6, 2018, at 10:30 p.m. on Band.

Sommelier Maria Antonia Russi won the competition over dentist Hugo Merchan on July 31, 2018.

== Contestants ==
=== Top 21 ===
Contestant	Age	Hometown	Occupation	Result	Winnings	Finish
Maria Antonia Russi	36	Porto Alegre	Sommelier	Winner on July 31	9	1st
Hugo Merchan	25	Marília	Dentist	Runner-up on July 31	8	2nd
Eliane Ribeiro	29	Ilhéus	Businesswoman	Eliminated on July 24	9	3rd
Thiago Gatto	35	Rio de Janeiro	PMERJ Major	Eliminated on July 17	6	4th
Katleen Lacerda	24	Ituiutaba	Literature teacher	Eliminated on July 10	9	5th
Evandro Zanardo	40	Tietê	Priest	Eliminated on July 3	7	6th/7th
Victor Hugo Garcia	35	Lages	Public agent	Eliminated on July 3	7	6th/7th
Rita Bruning	51	Florianópolis	Dentist	Eliminated on June 26	5	8th
Vinicius Rossignoli	32	Goiânia	Marketing consultant	Eliminated on June 19	4	9th
Rui Morschel	26	Curitiba	Production engineer	Eliminated on June 12	5	10th
Ana Luiza Amaral	25	Agudos	Designer	Eliminated on June 5	2	11th
Hugo Merchan	25	Marília	Dentist	Eliminated on May 22	2	Returned on May 29
Aristeu Guimarães	33	Imperatriz	Judiciary technician	Eliminated on May 15	2	12th
Clarisse Duarte	27	Belém	Unemployed	Eliminated on May 8	2	13th
Ana Luiza Amaral	25	Agudos	Designer	Eliminated on May 1	2	Returned on May 29
Angelica Lessa	41	Carangola	Psychologist	Eliminated on April 24	1	14th
Carlos Oliva	53	São Paulo	Businessman	Withdrew on April 24	1	15th
Kauê Pedroso	31	São Paulo	Art educator	Eliminated on April 17	2	16th
Crisleine Cardoso	30	Fogo, Cape Verde	Model	Eliminated on April 17	1	17th
Andressa Sanches	35	São José do Rio Preto	Businesswoman	Eliminated on April 10	0	18th
Brissa Ioselli	28	Mogi das Cruzes	Lawyer	Eliminated on April 3	1	19th
Tereza Amorim	21	Recife	Law student	Eliminated on March 27	0	20th
Dalvio Barrichello	34	São Paulo	Basketball coach	Eliminated on March 20	0	21st

== Elimination table ==
Place	Contestant	Episode																													
Place	Contestant	3^{^{1}}		4	5		6	7		8	9		10	11		12	13		14	15		16^{^{2}}	17^{^{3}}		18^{^{4}}	19		20	21		22
1	Maria Antonia	IN	HIGH	PT	IN	IN	HIGH	IN	WIN	WIN	IN	IN	PT	IN	IN	LOW			LOW	LOW	LOW	WIN	IN	WIN	WIN	LOW	WIN	WIN	HIGH	WIN	WINNER
2	Hugo	IN	HIGH	WIN	IN	IN	WIN	IN	IN	PT	IN	LOW	NPT	IN	HIGH	ELIM	IN	RET	WIN	WIN	IMM	NPT	IN	HIGH	WIN	WIN	IMM	WIN	WIN	IMM	RUNNER-UP
3	Eliane	WIN	IMM	NPT	LOW	LOW	WIN	IN	LOW	WIN	WIN	IMM	WIN	WIN	IMM	WIN			PT	LOW	HIGH	LOW	HIGH	IMM	WIN	IN	HIGH	WIN	LOW	ELIM	
4	Thiago	IN	IMM	WIN	WIN	IMM	HIGH	LOW	HIGH	NPT	HIGH	IMM	WIN	IN	IN	WIN			PT	HIGH	IMM	LOW	WIN	IMM	WIN	IN	LOW	ELIM			
5	Katleen	IN	IMM	WIN	IN	HIGH	WIN	IN	HIGH	WIN	IN	IN	WIN	LOW	IN	WIN			WIN	IN	LOW	WIN	LOW	WIN	LOW	HIGH	ELIM				
6	Evandro	IN	IN	WIN	HIGH	IMM	PT	WIN	IMM	WIN	IN	WIN	PT	LOW	IN	WIN			WIN	IN	IMM	WIN	IN	LOW	ELIM						
6	Victor Hugo	IN	WIN	WIN	IN	IN	WIN	HIGH	IMM	PT	LOW	IN	WIN	IN	LOW	WIN			WIN	LOW	WIN	WIN	LOW	HIGH	ELIM						
8	Rita	IN	IN	NPT	IN	WIN	WIN	HIGH	IMM	WIN	IN	HIGH	WIN	IN	HIGH	LOW			WIN	IN	IMM	WIN	HIGH	ELIM							
9	Vinícius	LOW	HIGH	PT	HIGH	IMM	PT	IN	IN	WIN	HIGH	IMM	LOW	IN	WIN	WIN			WIN	HIGH	WIN	ELIM									
10	Rui	IN	IN	LOW	IN	IN	PT	IN	IN	WIN	IN	WIN	WIN	HIGH	IMM	WIN			WIN	IN	ELIM										
11	Aristeu	IN	HIGH	WIN	IN	IN	WIN	IN	IN	LOW	IN	ELIM					RET	IMM	ELIM												
12	Ana Luiza	IN	IMM	LOW	IN	IN	LOW	LOW	LOW	WIN	IN	HIGH	WIN	LOW	ELIM																
13	Clarisse	IN	IN	WIN	HIGH	IMM	WIN	IN	IN	PT	LOW	IN	ELIM																		
14	Angelica	HIGH	IMM	WIN	IN	LOW	LOW	IN	LOW	ELIM																					
15	Carlos	IN	HIGH	PT	IN	IN	WIN	HIGH	IMM	WDR																					
16	Kauê	IN	IN	WIN	IN	IN	WIN	LOW	ELIM																						
16	Crisleine	LOW	HIGH	PT	LOW	IN	WIN	IN	ELIM																						
18	Andressa	IN	IMM	NPT	IN	HIGH	ELIM																								
19	Brissa	IN	HIGH	WIN	LOW	ELIM																									
20	Tereza	LOW	LOW	ELIM																											
21	Dalvio	HIGH	ELIM																												

=== Notes ===
- ^Note 1: Eliane won the Mystery Box challenge and advanced directly to next week without Angelica and Dalvio who were the challenge's top entries. Eliane was then asked to save five other people beside her. She chose Andressa, Angelica, Aristeu, Katleen and Thiago. Elimination Test's first round winner Victor Hugo and top entries Ana Luiza, Brissa, Carlos, Crisleine, Hugo, Maria Antonia and Vinicius also advanced. Teresa and Dalvio were bottom entries in the second and final round of the Elimination Test with Dalvio eliminated over Teresa.
- ^Note 2: The Yellow team (Evandro, Katleen and Maria Antonia) won the Team challenge and advanced directly to next week, while the Blue team (Rita, Thiago and Vinicius) was selected as the bottom team and sent to Pressure Test. The Red team (Eliane, Hugo and Victor Hugo) had each a chance to plead their cases to the judges to win an extra immunity. They choose Hugo. Victor Hugo won the first round of the Pressure Test and also advanced, leaving Eliane, Rita, Thiago and Vinicius in the bottom four. Rita won the second and final round, while Vinicius was eliminated over Eliane and Thiago.
- ^Note 3: Thiago won the Mystery Box challenge and advanced directly to next week without Eliane and Rita who were the challenge's top entries. Thiago was then asked to save only one of them. He chose Eliane. Katleen and Victor Hugo were selected as the bottom entries and were not eligible to compete in the first round of the Elimination Test where the winner would guarantee immunity. Maria Antonia won the challenge and also advanced, leaving six contestants to compete in the Elimination Test's final round.
- ^Note 4: The Blue team (Eliane, Maria Antonia and Thiago) won the Team challenge and advanced directly to next week. Hugo won the first round of the Pressure Test, leaving Evandro, Katleen and Victor Hugo in the bottom three. Katleen won the second and final round, while Evandro and Victor Hugo were both eliminated.

=== Key ===
- Winner
- Runner-up
- Individual challenge winner
- Individual challenge top entry
- Mystery Box bottom entry
- Team challenge winner
- Team challenge loser (PT)
- Immunity
- Immunity extra
- Saved first
- Saved last
- Eliminated
- Returned
- Did not compete

== Ratings and reception ==
=== Brazilian ratings ===
All numbers are in points and provided by Kantar Ibope Media.

Episode	Title	Air date	Timeslot (BRT)	SP viewers (in points)	BR viewers (in points)	Source
1	Top 38 – Duels (1)	March 6, 2018	Tuesday 10:30 p.m.	4.5	3.4	
2	Top 38 – Duels (2)	March 13, 2018	Tuesday 10:30 p.m.	3.8	3.0	
3	Top 21	March 20, 2018	Tuesday 10:30 p.m.	4.1	3.4	
4	Top 20	March 27, 2018	Tuesday 10:30 p.m.	3.6	3.5	
5	Top 19	April 3, 2018	Tuesday 10:30 p.m.	4.2	3.5	
6	Top 18	April 10, 2018	Tuesday 10:30 p.m.	4.3	3.6	
7	Top 17	April 17, 2018	Tuesday 10:30 p.m.	4.4	3.5	
8	Top 15	April 24, 2018	Tuesday 10:30 p.m.	4.9	3.7	
9	Top 13	May 1, 2018	Tuesday 10:30 p.m.	4.9	3.9	
10	Top 12	May 8, 2018	Tuesday 10:30 p.m.	5.0	3.8	
11	Top 11	May 15, 2018	Tuesday 10:30 p.m.	5.5	4.3	
12	Top 10	May 22, 2018	Tuesday 10:30 p.m.	4.6	3.9	
13	Reinstation challenge	May 29, 2018	Tuesday 10:30 p.m.	5.5	4.2	
14	Top 11 Redux	June 5, 2018	Tuesday 10:30 p.m.	5.8	4.4	
15	Top 10 Redux	June 12, 2018	Tuesday 10:30 p.m.	4.9	3.8	
16	Top 9	June 19, 2018	Tuesday 10:30 p.m.	5.0	4.0	
17	Top 8	June 26, 2018	Tuesday 10:30 p.m.	4.2	3.7	
18	Top 7	July 3, 2018	Tuesday 10:30 p.m.	5.0	3.7	
19	Top 5	July 10, 2018	Tuesday 10:30 p.m.	5.3	4.5	
20	Top 4	July 17, 2018	Tuesday 10:30 p.m.	5.3	4.3	
21	Top 3	July 24, 2018	Tuesday 10:30 p.m.	5.3	4.1	
22	Winner announced	July 31, 2018	Tuesday 10:30 p.m.	6.3	5.2	

- In 2018, each point represents 248.647 households in 15 market cities in Brazil (71.855 households in São Paulo)
