= MasterChef Creators =

2025 Brazilian TV series or program

- Genre: Cooking
- Presented by: Eduardo Camargo; Filipe Oliveira
- Judges: Érick Jacquin; Helena Rizzo; Henrique Fogaça
- Country of origin: Brazil
- Original language: Portuguese
- No. of seasons: 1
- No. of episodes: 3

Production
- Producers: Eyeworks; Shine International
- Running time: 35 minutes

Original release
- Network: BandPlay; YouTube
- Release: May 6 – May 20, 2025

Related
- MasterChef; MasterChef Junior; MasterChef Profissionais; MasterChef: A Revanche; MasterChef + MasterChef Confeitaria; MasterChef Celebridades

MasterChef Creators is a Brazilian online cooking competition series that premiered on Tuesday, May 6, 2025, at 7:30/6:30 p.m. (BRT / AMT) on BandPlay and YouTube.

The show is hosted by Eduardo Camargo and Filipe Oliveira, best known for their Diva Depressão YouTube channel. The chefs Érick Jacquin, Helena Rizzo and Henrique Fogaça as the show's judges.

Gi Souza, from Receitas de Minuto, won the competition over Will Procópio, from Receitas do Will, on May 20, 2025.

== Format ==
This version is a spin-off of the main MasterChef Brasil series, airing exclusively online and featuring digital influencers who create cooking content as contestants.

The winner receives a R$200.000 cash prize, a trip for two to any destination served by LATAM Airlines and the MasterChef Creators trophy.

== Contestants ==
=== Top 6 ===
Contestant	Age	Hometown	Profile	Result	Winnings	Finish
Gi Souza	39	São José dos Campos	Receitas de Minuto	Winner on May 20	3	1st
Willian "Will" Procópio	40	Belo Horizonte	Receitas do Will	Runner-up on May 20	1	2nd
Elisabete "Bete" Tavares	59	Tupã	Bete com Carinho	Eliminated on May 13	0	3rd/4th
Guilherme "Gui" Poulain	39	Lavras	Gui Poulain	Eliminated on May 13	1	3rd/4th
Greg Bosi	37	Caxias do Sul	Greg Bosi	Eliminated on May 6	0	5th/6th
Luiza Junqueira	33	São José dos Campos	Tá Querida	Eliminated on May 6	0	5th/6th

== Elimination table ==
Place	Contestant	Episode			
Place	Contestant	1	2		3
1	Gi	WIN	HIGH	WIN	WINNER
2	Will	LOW	WIN	HIGH	RUNNER-UP
3–4	Bete	LOW	IN	ELIM	
3–4	Gui	WIN	LOW	ELIM	
5–6	Greg	ELIM			
5–6	Luiza	ELIM			

Key

- The cook won MasterChef Creators.
- The cook was the runner-up.
- The cook won the individual challenge (Mystery Box or Elimination Test).
- The cook was one of the top entries in the individual challenge but did not win.
- The cook did not have to compete in that round and was safe from elimination.
- The cook was not selected as a top or bottom entry in an individual challenge.
- The cook was one of the bottom entries in the Mystery Box and received a disadvantaged in the Elimination Test.
- The cook was on the winning team in the Team Challenge.
- The cook was on the losing team in the Team Challenge.
- The cook was one of the bottom entries in an individual challenge but was saved first.
- The cook was one of the bottom entries in an individual challenge but was saved last.
- The cook won the Reinstation Challenge and returned to the competition.
- The cook was not eligible to compete in that round.
- The cook had to withdraw from the competition.
- The cook was eliminated from MasterChef Creators.
