= MasterChef (Brazilian TV series) season 3 =

MasterChef
- Season 3
- Presented by: Ana Paula Padrão
- Judges: Érick Jacquin; Paola Carosella; Henrique Fogaça
- No. of contestants: 21
- Winner: Leonardo
- Runner-up: Bruna
- No. of episodes: 25

Release
- Original network: Band
- Original release: March 15 – August 23, 2016

Season chronology
- ← Previous; Season 2 Next → Season 4

The third season of the Brazilian competitive reality television series MasterChef premiered on March 15, 2016 at 10:30 p.m. on Band.

Entrepreneur Leonardo Young won the competition over teacher Bruna Chaves on August 23, 2016.

== Contestants ==
=== Top 21 ===
Contestant	Age	Hometown	Occupation	Result	Winnings	Finish
Leonardo Young	30	São Paulo	Entrepreneur	Winner on August 23	7	1st
Bruna Chaves	29	Nova Lima	Teacher	Runner-up on August 23	11	2nd
Raquel Novais	32	Belo Horizonte	Entrepreneur	Eliminated on August 16	12	3rd
Luriana Toledo	27	Mogi das Cruzes	Physiotherapist	Eliminated on August 9	8	4th
Fabio Nunes	30	Taquari	Model	Eliminated on August 2	7	5th
Lee Fu Kuang	56	Taipei, Taiwan	Doctor & researcher	Eliminated on July 26	7	6th
Paula Salles	33	Rio de Janeiro	Cultural producer	Eliminated on July 19	5	7th
Aluisio Nahime	32	Cajuru	Merchant	Eliminated on July 12	5	8th
Pedro Lima	27	Teresópolis	Business consultant	Eliminated on July 6	4	9th
Fernando Bianchi	31	São Paulo	Analyst controller	Eliminated on July 5	2	10th
Thaiana Wosniak	31	Guarapuava	Lawyer & announcer	Eliminated on June 28	4	11th
Gleice Simão	20	São Paulo	Student	Eliminated on June 21	3	12th
Vanessa Vagnotti	46	Vitória	Dance teacher	Eliminated on June 14	3	13th
Rodrigo Silva	34	Rio de Janeiro	Police officer	Eliminated on June 7	4	14th
Gleice Simão	20	São Paulo	Student	Eliminated on May 24	2	Returned on May 31
Livia Cathiard	27	Rio de Janeiro	Producer	Eliminated on May 17	3	15th
Guilherme Joventino	37	Belo Horizonte	Commercial director	Withdrew on May 10	3	16th
Nuno Codeço	37	Lisbon, Portugal	CFO	Eliminated on May 10	1	17th
Gabriella Palinkas	26	São Paulo	Chemical engineer	Eliminated on May 3	1	18th
Rodrigo "Tenente" Domingues	35	São Paulo	Product manager	Eliminated on April 26	1	19th
Victor Branco	27	Salvador	Publicist	Eliminated on April 19	1	20th
Fernando Bianchi	31	São Paulo	Analyst controller	Eliminated on April 12	0	Returned on May 31
Hellen Cruz	29	Osasco	Publicist	Eliminated on April 5	0	21st

== Elimination table ==
Place	Contestant	Episode																																	
Place	Contestant	4		5	6		7	8		9	10		11	12		13	14		15	16		17	18		19	20		21	22^{^{1}}		23		24		25
1	Leonardo	HIGH	IMM	LOW	LOW	IN	PT	HIGH	IMM	PT	IN	IN	WIN			WIN	HIGH	IMM	LOW	HIGH	IMM	PT	IN	IN	WIN	IN	LOW	WIN	LOW	WIN	HIGH	WIN	WIN	IMM	WINNER
2	Bruna	WIN	IMM	PT	HIGH	IMM	WIN	IN	IMM	PT	HIGH	IMM	WIN			WIN	IN	HIGH	WIN	IN	WIN	WIN	IN	WIN	WIN	LOW	HIGH	WIN	WIN	IMM	IN	LOW	HIGH	WIN	RUNNER-UP
3	Raquel	IN	WIN	WIN	WIN	IMM	WIN	HIGH	IMM	WIN	LOW	IN	PT			PT	HIGH	IMM	WIN	WIN	IMM	WIN	WIN	IMM	LOW	IN	WIN	LOW	IN	WIN	WIN	IMM	LOW	ELIM	
4	Luriana	IN	IN	WIN	IN	IN	WIN	HIGH	IMM	WIN	HIGH	IMM	WIN			WIN	WIN	IMM	WIN	IN	IN	LOW	IN	HIGH	WIN	HIGH	IMM	WIN	HIGH	LOW	IN	ELIM			
5	Fabio	HIGH	IMM	HIGH	IN	IN	PT	LOW	IN	PT	IN	IN	WIN			WIN	HIGH	IMM	PT	IN	LOW	WIN	WIN	IMM	WIN	WIN	IMM	WIN	HIGH	ELIM					
6	Lee	LOW	IN	NPT	IN	HIGH	WIN	WIN	IMM	WIN	IN	HIGH	WIN			PT	IN	LOW	WIN	LOW	LOW	WIN	WIN	IMM	PT	LOW	LOW	ELIM							
7	Paula	IN	LOW	WIN	IN	IN	LOW	IN	HIGH	WIN	IN	IN	PT			PT	IN	LOW	WIN	LOW	LOW	WIN	IN	IN	WIN	IN	ELIM								
8	Aluisio	IN	HIGH	WIN	IN	WIN	HIGH	IN	IN	PT	LOW	LOW	LOW			WIN	IN	WIN	PT	HIGH	IMM	WIN	IN	LOW	ELIM										
9	Pedro	IN	IN	HIGH	IN	IN	LOW	IN	WIN	HIGH	IN	WIN	WIN			WIN	IN	LOW	NPT	LOW	IN	LOW	IN	ELIM											
10	Fernando	IN	IN	ELIM										HIGH	RET	WIN	LOW	HIGH	PT	IN	IN	ELIM													
11	Thaiana	HIGH	IMM	NPT	IN	IN	WIN	HIGH	IMM	WIN	LOW	HIGH	PT			WIN	IN	IN	WIN	IN	ELIM														
12	Gleice	IN	IN	WIN	LOW	HIGH	NPT	IN	LOW	WIN	HIGH	IMM	ELIM	HIGH	RET	LOW	LOW	IN	ELIM																
13	Vanessa	HIGH	IMM	WIN	IN	IN	HIGH	IN	WIN	LOW	WIN	IMM	PT			WIN	LOW	ELIM																	
14	Rodrigo	IN	IN	WIN	HIGH	IMM	WIN	IN	IN	WIN	HIGH	IMM	WIN			ELIM																			
15	Livia	LOW	IN	WIN	HIGH	IMM	WIN	IN	LOW	WIN	IN	ELIM																							
16	Guilherme	LOW	IN	WIN	HIGH	IMM	WIN	LOW	IN	WIN	WDR																								
17	Nuno	IN	IN	HIGH	IN	LOW	WIN	LOW	IN	ELIM																									
18	Gabriella	HIGH	IMM	PT	IN	IN	WIN	IN	ELIM																										
19	Tenente	IN	IN	WIN	LOW	IN	ELIM																												
20	Victor	IN	IN	WIN	IN	ELIM																													
21	Hellen	IN	ELIM																																

^Note 1 : Bruna won the Mystery Box challenge and advanced directly to the Top 4, while Leonardo was selected the bottom entry and was not eligible to compete in the first round of the Elimination Test. Raquel won the first round and also advanced to the Top 4, leaving Fabio, Leonardo and Luriana in the bottom three. Leornado won the second and final round, while Fabio was eliminated over Luriana.

Key

Winner	Runner-up	Individual challenge winner
Team challenge winner	Team challenge loser (PT)	Individual challenge top entry
Immunity	Saved first	Saved last
Immunity extra	Mystery Box bottom entry	Eliminated
Withdrew	Returned	Did not compete

== Ratings and reception ==
=== Brazilian ratings ===
All numbers are in points and provided by IBOPE.

Week	Episode	Air Date	Timeslot (BRT)	Viewers (in points)	Rank Timeslot	Source
1	Auditions 1	March 15, 2016	Tuesday 10:30 p.m.	3.8	4	
2	Auditions 2	March 22, 2016	Tuesday 10:30 p.m.	4.7	4	
3	Auditions 3	March 29, 2016	Tuesday 10:30 p.m.	4.5	4	
4	Top 21	April 5, 2016	Tuesday 10:30 p.m.	4.5	4	
5	Top 20	April 12, 2016	Tuesday 10:30 p.m.	5.4	4	
6	Top 19	April 19, 2016	Tuesday 10:30 p.m.	6.0	4	
7	Top 18	April 26, 2016	Tuesday 10:30 p.m.	5.3	4	
8	Top 17	May 3, 2016	Tuesday 10:30 p.m.	6.0	4	
9	Top 16	May 10, 2016	Tuesday 10:30 p.m.	6.3	4	
10	Top 15	May 17, 2016	Tuesday 10:30 p.m.	6.0	4	
11	Top 13	May 24, 2016	Tuesday 10:30 p.m.	5.4	4	
12	Reinstation Challenge	May 31, 2016	Tuesday 10:30 p.m.	6.3	4	
13	Top 14 Redux	June 7, 2016	Tuesday 10:30 p.m.	6.2	4	
14	Top 13 Redux	June 14, 2016	Tuesday 10:30 p.m.	5.6	4	
15	Top 12	June 21, 2016	Tuesday 10:30 p.m.	5.4	4	
16	Top 11	June 28, 2016	Tuesday 10:30 p.m.	6.4	4	
17	Top 10	July 5, 2016	Tuesday 10:30 p.m.	6.6	4	
18	Top 9	July 6, 2016	Wednesday 10:30 p.m.	5.5	4	
19	Top 8	July 12, 2016	Tuesday 10:30 p.m.	6.8	4	
20	Top 7	July 19, 2016	Tuesday 10:30 p.m.	7.7	3	
21	Top 6	July 26, 2016	Tuesday 10:30 p.m.	8.2	2	
22	Top 5	August 2, 2016	Tuesday 10:30 p.m.	8.2	2	
23	Top 4	August 9, 2016	Tuesday 10:30 p.m.	5.8	3	
24	Top 3	August 16, 2016	Tuesday 10:30 p.m.	6.5	3	
25	Season Finale	August 23, 2016	Tuesday 10:30 p.m.	7.8	3	

- In 2016, each point represents 69.417 households in São Paulo.

Note: Episode 3 aired against the Paraguay vs. Brazil football match for the 2018 FIFA World Cup qualification.
Note: Episode 4 aired against the season finale of Big Brother Brasil 16.
Note: Episode 15 aired against the season finale of Power Couple Brasil.
Note: Episode 23 aired against the South Africa vs. Brazil group match for the Women's football tournament at the 2016 Summer Olympics.
Note: Episode 24 aired against the Brazil vs. China quarterfinal match for the Women's volleyball tournament at the 2016 Summer Olympics.
