= MasterChef (Brazilian TV series) =

- Genre: Cookery; Talent show
- Created by: Franc Roddam
- Based on: MasterChef
- Presented by: Ana Paula Padrão
- Judges: Henrique Fogaça; Paola Carosella; Érick Jacquin; Helena Rizzo; Rodrigo Oliveira
- Narrated by: Ana Paula Padrão; Bruna Thedy
- Country of origin: Brazil
- Original language: Portuguese
- No. of seasons: 12
- No. of episodes: 223

Production
- Executive producers: Eyeworks (2014–15); Endemol Shine Group (2016–20); Banijay (2020–)
- Producers: Shine International (2014–15); Endemol Shine Group (2015–20); Banijay (2020–)
- Production locations: São Paulo (2014–21, 2024–); São Bernardo do Campo (2022–23)
- Camera setup: Multi-camera
- Running time: 120 minutes

Original release
- Network: Rede Bandeirantes
- Release: September 2, 2014 – present

Related
- MasterChef Junior; MasterChef Profissionais; MasterChef: A Revanche; MasterChef + MasterChef Confeitaria; MasterChef Creators; MasterChef Celebridades

MasterChef, also known as MasterChef Brasil, is the Brazilian version of the competitive cooking reality show MasterChef airing on Band. The series premiered on September 2, 2014.

Amateur chefs compete to become the best amateur home cook in Brazil through challenges issued by judges Érick Jacquin, Paola Carosella and Henrique Fogaça. Ana Paula Padrão is the main host.

Earlier in 2021, Paola Carosella announced that she would be departing from the show. Her spot will be filled by Helena Rizzo in the next edition of the competition.

== Format ==
Chefs were initially selected through auditions, selecting a total of one hundred competitors to the start of the televised competition. In the preliminary rounds, each of these had an opportunity to prepare a signature dish for the trio of judges.

The contestants were given a limited amount of time to prep their dish, and then given five minutes before the three judges to complete the cooking and assembly of the dish, during which the judges ask about their background.

The 3 judges taste the dish, and vote "yes" or "no" to keeping the chef in the competition; 2 "yes" votes are required for the chef to move on and receive a MasterChef apron, while those that fail to do so leave the competition.

On the first three seasons, two rounds were then used to trim the number of chefs to 16–21. One type of challenge has the chefs performing a routine task such as dicing onions, during which the judges will observe their technique.

Judges can advance a chef to the next round or eliminate them at any time during the challenge by taking their apron. A second type of challenge is to have the chefs invent a new dish around a staple ingredient or a theme, with the judges advancing or eliminating players based on the taste of their dishes.

Subsequently, the formal competition begins typically following a 2-event cycle that takes place over a 2-hour episode, with a chef eliminated after the second event. The events typically are: Mystery Box Challenge, Elimination Test, Team Challenge and Pressure Test.

This cycle continues until only two chefs remain. The judges then select the winner of MasterChef.

== Series overview ==
=== Season chronology ===
Season	Winner	Finalist(s)		Host	Judges		
1	Elisa Fernandes	Helena Manoso		Ana Paula Padrão	Henrique Fogaça	Paola Carosella	Érick Jacquin
2	Izabel Alvares	Raul Lemos		Ana Paula Padrão	Henrique Fogaça	Paola Carosella	Érick Jacquin
3	Leonardo Young	Bruna Chaves		Ana Paula Padrão	Henrique Fogaça	Paola Carosella	Érick Jacquin
4	Michele Crispim	Deborah Werneck		Ana Paula Padrão	Henrique Fogaça	Paola Carosella	Érick Jacquin
5	Maria Antônia Russi	Hugo Merchan		Ana Paula Padrão	Henrique Fogaça	Paola Carosella	Érick Jacquin
6	Rodrigo Massoni	Lorena Dayse		Ana Paula Padrão	Henrique Fogaça	Paola Carosella	Érick Jacquin
7	Anna Paula Nico	Hailton Arruda	Heitor Cardoso	Ana Paula Padrão	Henrique Fogaça	Paola Carosella	Érick Jacquin
8	Isabella Scherer	Eduardo Prado	Kelyn Kuhn	Ana Paula Padrão	Henrique Fogaça	Helena Rizzo	Érick Jacquin
9	Lays Fernandes	Fernanda Oliveira		Ana Paula Padrão	Henrique Fogaça	Helena Rizzo	Érick Jacquin
10	Ana Carolina Porto	Wilton Duarte		Ana Paula Padrão	Rodrigo Oliveira	Helena Rizzo	Érick Jacquin
11	José Roberto Gomes	Giorgia Paladini		Ana Paula Padrão	Henrique Fogaça	Helena Rizzo	Érick Jacquin
12	Daniela Dantas	Felipe Bruzzi		—N/a	Henrique Fogaça	Helena Rizzo	Érick Jacquin
13	Jéssica Cechella	Carla Araújo		—N/a	Henrique Fogaça	Helena Rizzo	Érick Jacquin

== Ratings and reception ==
Season	Timeslot (BRT)	Premiered		Ended		TV season	SP viewers (in points)	Source
Season	Timeslot (BRT)	Date	Viewers (in points)	Date	Viewers (in points)	TV season	SP viewers (in points)	Source
1	Tuesday 10:30 p.m.	September 2, 2014	3.6	December 16, 2014	7.8	2014–15	4.52	
2	Tuesday 10:30 p.m.	May 19, 2015	5.1	September 15, 2015	10.2	2015–16	7.16	
3	Tuesday 10:30 p.m.	March 15, 2016	3.8	August 23, 2016	7.8	2016–17	6.03	
4	Tuesday 10:30 p.m.	March 7, 2017	5.0	August 22, 2017	8.1	2017–18	6.11	
5	Tuesday 10:30 p.m.	March 6, 2018	4.5	July 31, 2018	6.3	2018–19	4.84	
6	Sunday 08:00 p.m.	March 24, 2019	4.1	August 25, 2019	4.4	2019–20	3.56	
7	Tuesday 10:45 p.m.	July 14, 2020	4.4	December 29, 2020	2.2	2020–21	2.05	
8	Tuesday 10:45 p.m.	July 6, 2021	2.5	December 14, 2021	2.7	2021–22	2.30	
9	Tuesday 10:45 p.m.	May 17, 2022	2.6	September 6, 2022	2.9	2022–23	2.72	
10	Tuesday 10:45 p.m.	May 2, 2023	1.7	September 12, 2023	2.4	2023–24	2.14	
11	Tuesday 10:30 p.m.	May 28, 2024	2.3	November 12, 2024	2.1	2024–25	1.76	
12	Tuesday 10:30 p.m.	May 27, 2025	1.0	September 2, 2025	2.0	2025–26	1.50	
13	Tuesday 10:30 p.m.	May 26, 2026	1.3			2026–27		

- Each point represents a specific number of households in São Paulo.
  - 2014: 65.000 households.
  - 2015: 67.000 households.
  - 2016: 69.000 households.
  - 2017: 70.500 households.
  - 2018: 71.855 households.
  - 2019: 73.015 households.
  - 2020: 74.987 households.
  - 2021: 76.577 households.
  - 2022: 74.666 households.
  - 2023: 76.953 households.
  - 2024: 73.279 households.
  - 2025: 77.488 households.
  - 2026: 78.780 households.

== Spin-offs ==
=== MasterChef Junior ===
MasterChef Junior is a series featuring children from ages 9 to 13 as contestants, aiming to find the best junior chef in Brazil. The series premiered on October 20, 2015.

=== MasterChef Profissionais ===
MasterChef Profissionais is series featuring professional chefs as contestants, aiming to find the best professional chef in Brazil. The series premiered on October 4, 2016.

=== MasterChef: A Revanche ===
MasterChef: A Revanche is series featured returning former contestants from the first six series, who did not win the competition before, as contestants, aiming to find the best all-star chef from MasterChef. The series premiered on October 15, 2019.

=== MasterChef + ===
MasterChef + is a series featuring seniors over 60 years old as contestants, aiming to find the best senior chef in Brazil. The series premiered on November 15, 2022.

=== MasterChef Confeitaria ===
MasterChef Confeitaria is series featuring professional bakers as contestants, aiming to find the best professional baker in Brazil. The series premiered on November 19, 2024.

=== MasterChef Creators ===
MasterChef Creators is series featuring digital influencers as contestants, and aired exclusively online, aiming to find the best digital influencer chef in Brazil. The series premiered on May 8, 2025.

=== MasterChef Celebridades ===
MasterChef Celebridades is series featuring celebrities as contestants, aiming to find the best celebrity chef in Brazil. The series premiered on November 18, 2025.

=== MasterChef: Para Tudo ===
MasterChef: Para Tudo is a TV show featuring interviews with judges and former contestants, plus recipes and memes, presented by Ana Paula Padrão. The series premiered on March 26, 2019.

The program name referenced the recurring expression "stop everything!" said to the competitors by the presenter Ana Paula Padrão in the competition versions of the franchise.

The format of this version did not consist of a game between chefs, but of interviews, reports, recipes, best moments and viral content about the franchise.

All material used in the program was exclusive, including interviews with the eliminated, family members and guests about the competition's developments. The program also brought public participation on social media, interacting with the presenter.

== Awards and nominations ==
Year	Country	Award	Category	Recipient	Result
2014	Brazil	Retrospectiva UOL	Best Reality Show	MasterChef Brasil	Nominated
2014	Brazil	Retrospectiva UOL	Best Presenter	Ana Paula Padrão	Nominated
2014	Brazil	Prêmio F5	TV Show of the Year	MasterChef Brasil	Won
2014	Brazil	Prêmio F5	Presenter of the Year	Ana Paula Padrão	Nominated
2014	Brazil	Melhor do Ano NaTelinha	Best Reality Show	MasterChef Brasil	Won
2015	Brazil	Prêmio Extra de Televisão	TV Show of the Year	MasterChef Brasil	Nominated
2015	Brazil	Troféu APCA	TV Show of the Year	MasterChef Brasil	Won
2015	Brazil	Retrospectiva UOL	Best Reality Show	MasterChef Brasil	Nominated
2015	Brazil	Prêmio F5	Best Reality Show	MasterChef Brasil	Nominated
2015	Brazil	Melhores do Ano NaTelinha	Best Reality Show	MasterChef Brasil	Won
2016	Brazil	Troféu Internet	Best Reality Show	MasterChef Brasil	Nominated
2016	Brazil	Prêmio TVPédia Brasil	Best Reality Show or Talent Show	MasterChef Brasil	Won
2016	Brazil	Prêmio TVPédia Brasil	Best Program Presenter without Auditorium	Ana Paula Padrão	Won
2017	Brazil	Meus Prêmios Nick 2017	TV Show of the Year	MasterChef Brasil	Nominated
2017	Brazil	Prêmio TVPédia Brasil	Best Reality Show or Talent Show	MasterChef Brasil	Nominated
2017	Brazil	Prêmio TVPédia Brasil	Best Program Presenter without Auditorium	Ana Paula Padrão	Nominated
2018	Brazil	MTV Millennial Awards Brasil	Best Reality Show	MasterChef Brasil	Nominated
2018	Brazil	Meus Prêmios Nick 2018	TV Show of the Year	MasterChef Brasil	Nominated
2019	Brazil	Meus Prêmios Nick 2019	TV Show of the Year	MasterChef Brasil	Nominated
2019	Brazil	Prêmio F5	Best Reality Show	MasterChef Brasil	Won
2020	Brazil	Splash Awards	Best Reality Show Presenter	Ana Paula Padrão	Nominated
2020	Brazil	Prêmio Contigo! Online 2020	Best Reality Show	MasterChef Brasil	Nominated
2021	Brazil	Prêmio Área VIP	Best Talent Show	MasterChef Brasil	Nominated
2022	Brazil	Prêmio Contigo! Online 2022	Best Reality Show	MasterChef Brasil	Nominated
2025	Brazil	Troféu Imprensa	Best Cooking Reality Show	MasterChef Brasil	Won
2025	Brazil	Troféu Internet	Best Cooking Reality Show	MasterChef Brasil	Won
