= Helena Rizzo =

Brazilian chef and restaurateur (born 1978)

Helena Rizzo Bins (December 6, 1978) is a Brazilian chef and restaurateur. She runs the restaurant Maní in São Paulo. Rizzo was elected Best Female Chef of the Year by Restaurant Magazine in 2014.

== Biography ==
Born in Porto Alegre, Rio Grande do Sul, Rizzo studied Architecture at the Pontifical Catholic University of Rio Grande do Sul. She left the college and began working as a model. A friend, model Fernanda Lima, invited her to move to São Paulo. She quit modeling and became a cook in 1997, working at the restaurant Roanne, with Claude Troisgros and Emmanuel Bassoleil. She did internships in Europe at the restaurants Sadler, in Italy and El Celler de Can Roca, in Spain. In 2006, when she returned to Brazil, Rizzo, her husband Daniel Redondo, and associates, among them Lima, opened the restaurant Maní.

In 2014 Maní was elected the 36th best restaurant in the world by Restaurant magazine, and second best in South America, behind D.O.M. In 2015, it was awarded a Michelin star.

In 2018, Rizzo appeared as a judge on the "Brazil" episode of The Final Table, season 1.

In 2019 Food & Wine named Mani to their list of the 30 best restaurants in the world.

In 2021 was announced as a judge on the Brazilian version of the Masterchef franchise, replacing the previous judge Paola Carosella.
