= Paola Carosella =

Cook and MasterChef judge

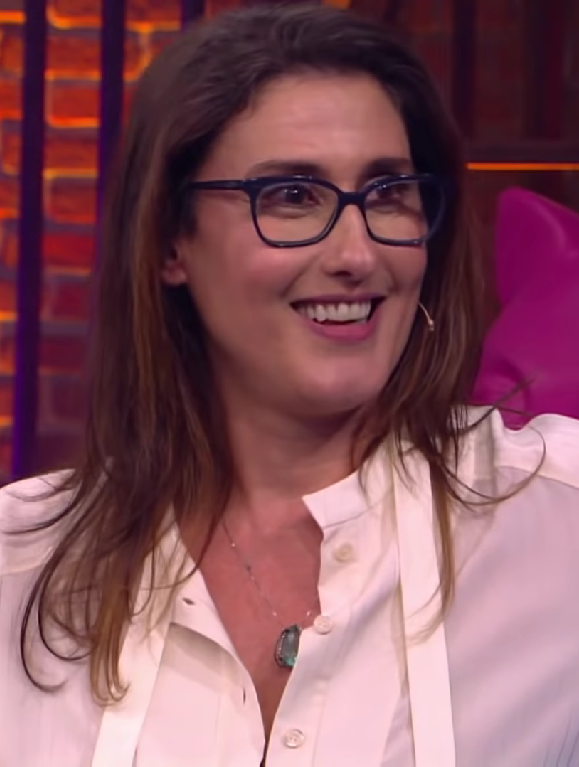
Carosella in 2021

Paola Florencia Carosella (born October 30, 1972) is an Argentine-Brazilian cook, businesswoman, executive and celebrity chef of Italian descent. She is currently based in Brazil.

== Biography ==
Paola was born in Argentina, the only daughter of a middle-class family. Her paternal and maternal grandparents are both from Italy. Her father, the Italian Roberto Carosella, was a photographer and racing driver, while her mother, Irma Polverari, built a successful career as a lawyer.

She was introduced to the kitchen by her grandmothers, who planted and harvested the foods to be prepared. After completing the equivalent of high school in the country, she began working in restaurants in Buenos Aires. Paola used to be a judge on MasterChef Brazil, alongside Brazilian Henrique Fogaça and French chef Érick Jacquin. She was later replaced by Brazilian chef Helena Rizzo.

On November 7, 2016, Paola released her first book which is a mix of autobiography and a collection of recipes, titled Todas as sextas (Every Friday).

She has a daughter named Francesca (born 2011) from a previous relationship.

== Gastronomic career ==
She worked with Argentine chef Francis Mallmann before traveling to Paris and working in restaurants such as Le Grand Véfour, Le Celadon and Le Bristol. She even worked as a cook in restaurants in California, the United States, and Uruguay, before moving to Mendoza, Argentina, in 1994, and working at the Patagonia West restaurant in New York City.

=== A Figueira Rubaiyat ===
In 2001, she was invited to move to São Paulo, Brazil, to open and direct the kitchen of the restaurant A Figueira Rubaiyat, along with Francis Mallmann and Belarmino Fernandez Iglesias.

== Restaurants ==
- 2001 - A Figueira Rubaiyat
- 2003 - Julia Cocina
- 2008 - Arturito
- 2014 - La Guapa

== Awards ==
- 2009: Chief revelation in Gula magazine
- 2009: Best Varied Restaurant in Veja Magazine
- 2010: Chef of the year in Veja magazine
- 2010: Best Varied Restaurant in Veja Magazine
- 2014: Best Chef of the year by Guia da Folha
- 2016/2017: Best Salgado in Veja São Paulo Eating & Drinking
