= Érick Jacquin =

French chef, naturalized Brazilian (born 1964)

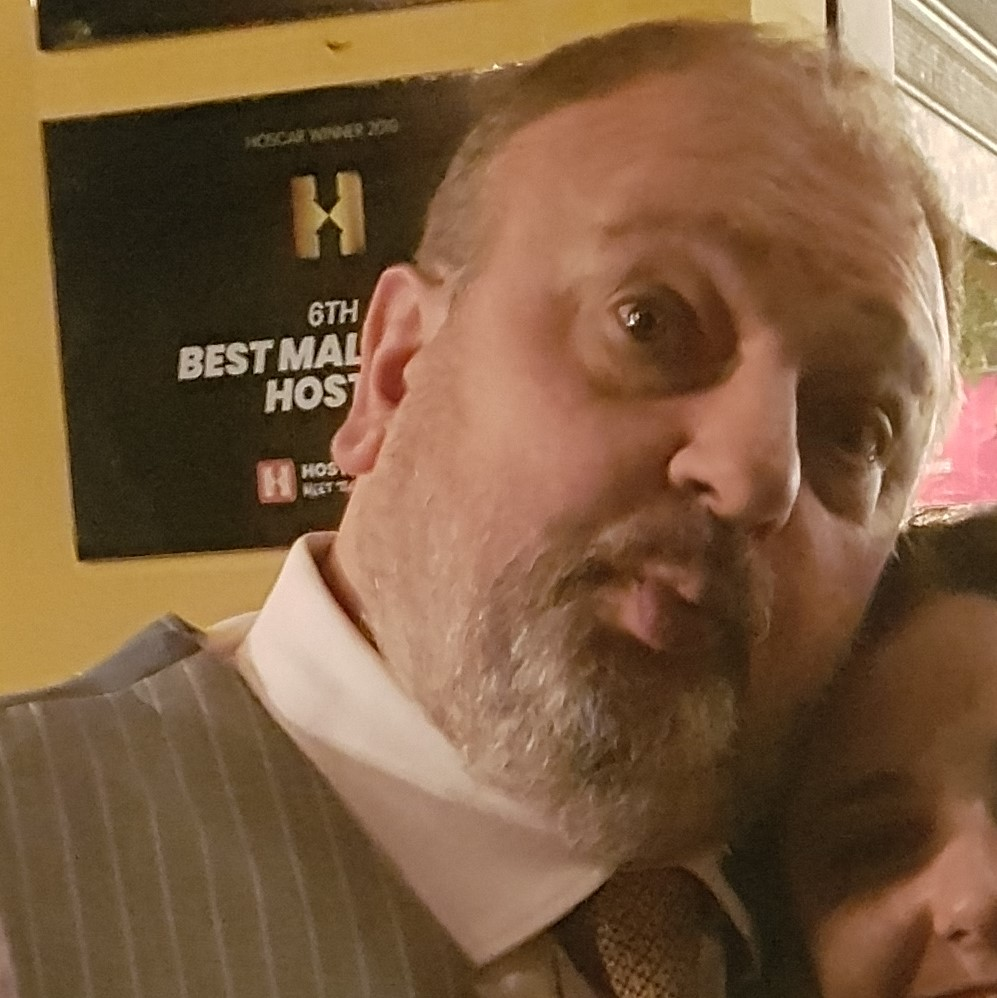
- Jacquin in 2019
- Born: 9 December 1964 (age 61); Saint-Amand-Montrond, France
- Spouse: Rosangela Menezes (m. 2015)
- Children: Edouard Jacquin (b. 1998); Elise (b. 2018); Antoine (b. 2018)
- Culinary career
- Cooking style: French
- Current restaurants: Président (2019–present); Ça-Va (2021–present); Lvtetia (2021–present); Steak Bife (2022–present)
- Previous restaurant: La Brasserie (2004–2013)
- Television shows: MasterChef Brasil (2014–present); Pesadelo na Cozinha (2017–present)
- Award won: Legion of Honour (Chevalier)
- Website: erickjacquin.com.br

Érick Jacquin (born December 9, 1964) is a French chef, naturalized Brazilian, who works in Latin America. He became better known after joining the talent show MasterChef, broadcast in Brazil by networks Band and Discovery Home & Health. The chef also presents the program "Pesadelo na Cozinha" (in English: Nightmare in the Kitchen), broadcast by Band, which aims to help restaurants on the verge of bankruptcy to rise. Since 2019, he started publishing videos on his YouTube channel, where he presents the preparation of recipes in the kitchen of his restaurant Président, with the participation of his employees. On October 8, 2020, he scheduled a debut on Band of the Minha Renda program, always on Thursdays, at 10:45 pm.

== Biography ==
Érick was born in 1964, in Saint-Amand-Montrond, a French commune in the administrative region of the Center, in the department of Cher and at the age of four moved to Dun-sur-Auron, a small and traditional town in the department of Cher, located in the center from France near the Loire Valley, wine region and also from the castles where the kings of France lived. This region has some gastronomic specialties, but it is not haute cuisine or what predominates. For this reason, Érick, after attending École Hôtelière Saint Amand Monrond, decided to leave his hometown for Paris - capital of great restaurants and where the greatest Chefs were needed.

In personal life, he married Rosangela Menezes in 2015. As a result of marriage, he has twin children. The date of birth is December 23, 2018. The children are named Antoine and Elise Jacquin. He is a Roman Catholic.

== Career ==
In Paris, Jacquin started working with Alain Morel, at the Chardenoux Restaurant, and then with Gérard Faucher. Then with Philippe Groult, Roland Magne - "Maître Cuisinier de France" and also at the Restaurant "Le Toit de Passy", all starred restaurants. He worked with Henri Charvet - "Maître Cuisinier de France" and owner of Restaurant "Le Comte de Gascogne", who entrusted him with the responsibility of the kitchen of the restaurant specializing in "Foie Gras" with touches of aromas from Provence. After six years of work, he received his first Michelin star in 1995.

=== In Brazil ===
Érick Jacquin accepted the proposal that took him to São Paulo to command the kitchen of the restaurant Le Coq Hardy, where he stayed for 4 years and won the respect of the public and the specialized critic. During the last 5 years, at the helm of the kitchen of Café Antiqüe, he definitively established himself as one of the great Chefs of Cuisine in operation in Brazil, receiving the title of Chef of the Year several times, and consecrated the Café Antique restaurant, until hung up. As a consultant, Érick is responsible for the menus at Le Vin Bistrot, Children's Buffet Billy Willy and L´Ami Bistrô, in Itaim. Érick performs French cuisine.

== Tribute ==
On December 9, 1998, the day on which Érick turned 34, he became the first chef in action in South America to be recognized and named "Maître Cuisinier de France" - the highest honor French Gastronomy.

== Restaurants ==
- Duke Bistrot - Campinas
- La Brasserie (2004–2013)
- Le Bife
- Tartar & Co
- La Cocotte Bistrot - São Paulo
- La Brasserie de La Mer - Natal
- Président - São Paulo
- Ça-va - São Paulo
- Lvtetia - São Paulo
- Nui 360 - João Pessoa

== Filmography ==
=== Television ===
Year	Title
2014 – present	MasterChef Brazil
2015	MasterChef Júnior
2016–2019	MasterChef Professionals
2017 – present	Kitchen Nightmares Brazil
2019	MasterChef: The Revenge
2020	My Recipe

=== Internet ===
Year	Title	Office	Platform
2019–present	Erick Jacquin	Presenter	YouTube
