= Ana Paula Padrão =

Brazilian journalist

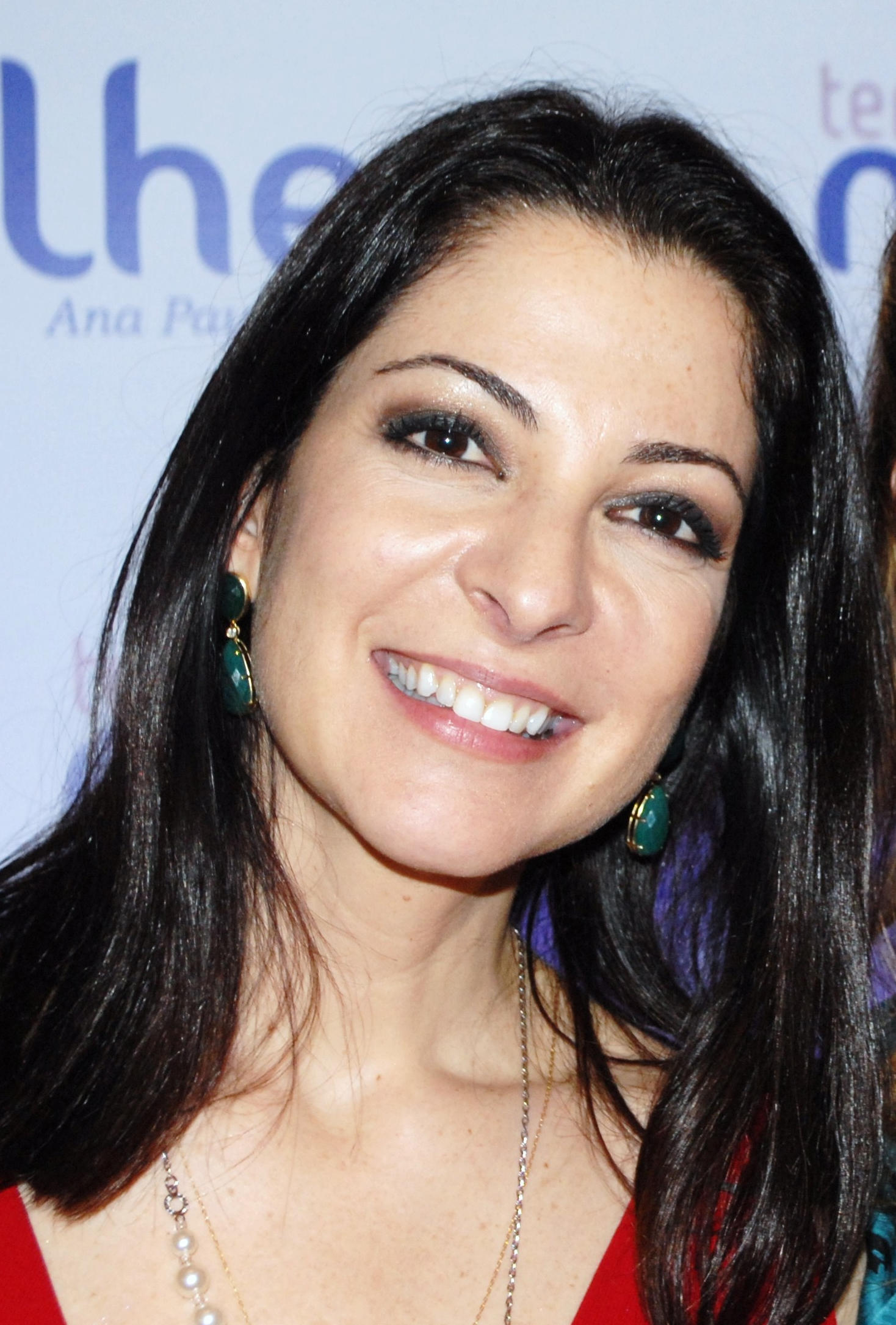
- Born: November 25, 1965 (age 60); Brasília, Federal District, Brazil
- Occupation: Journalist

Ana Paula de Vasconcelos Padrão, also known as Ana Paula Padrão (Brasília, November 25, 1965) is a Brazilian journalist, chief editor, entrepreneur, writer and television presenter. She has been a journalist for over thirty years, working for several Brazilian television networks, including Manchete, Rede Globo, SBT and Record. Currently she works for Band Networks, where she hosts MasterChef Brazil, MasterChef Profissionais and MasterChef Para Tudo. She also presents Conexão com The New York Times in BandNews TV.

== Notable works ==
From 1987 until 2005, Padrão worked for Rede Globo in London and New York City, covering mostly international news, including the September 11 attacks and the War in Afghanistan. She signed a new contract in May 2005, to work as a chief editor and host of the national news SBT Brasil, for SBT Networks and two years later she started to present SBT Realidade, a weekly television documentary. From 2009 until 2013, she worked for Rede Record as host of the national news Jornal da Record.

In 2014, Padrão released her first book, O Amor Chegou Tarde em Minha Vida (Love Arrived Late in My Life), and started to host all MasterChef versions in Brazil and a new television documentary titled Ana Paula Padrão.Doc (stylized as _anapaulapadrão.doc).

Padrão founded Touareg, an agency specialized in developing content, documentaries and series for television. She is also the founder of the following websites: Tempo de Mulher (Woman's Time) and Escola de Você (School of You), both of them created in 2014.
