= MasterChef Profissionais season 6 =

MasterChef Profissionais
- Season 6
- Judges: Érick Jacquin; Helena Rizzo; Henrique Fogaça
- No. of contestants: 18
- No. of episodes: 16

Release
- Original network: Band; Discovery Home & Health; Discovery+ HBO Max
- Original release: October 6, 2026 – January 19, 2027

Season chronology
- ← Previous; Season 5

The sixth season of the Brazilian competitive reality television series MasterChef Profissionais premiered on October 6, 2026, three years after the previous season, airing on Band at 10:30 / 9:30 p.m. (BRT / AMT). The season features both returning contestants and new chefs.

Érick Jacquin, Helena Rizzo and Henrique Fogaça returned as judges.

== Prize and sponsors ==
The winner will receive a cash prize of R$300,000, a trip to Italy sponsored by Nomad, a R$30,000 shopping voucher from Havan, a professional combi oven from Unox, a cookware and utensils set from Le Creuset, and the MasterChef Profissionais trophy.

The season has 13 sponsors, divided into four categories. Cacau Show, Heinz, Kitchen, Nestlé, and Nomad are in the Master category. Bombril, Concha y Toro, Dona Benta, Havan and Pilecco Nobre are in the Chef category. Dako is in the Sponsorship category, while Le Creuset and Unox are in the Prize category.

== Contestants ==
On September 18, 2026, Band announced that the season's cast would feature an equal number of returning contestants and previously unknown chefs. The returning contestants were described as former participants who had left their mark on the show's history.

On October 1, 2026, the new contestants were revealed, completing the season's lineup alongside the returning contestants previously announced.

Contestant	Type	Age	Hometown	Occupation	Result	Winnings	Finish
Daniela Rosa	Rookie	36	Rio de Janeiro	Chef		1	
Fernanda Oliveira; Runner-up on MasterChef 9	Veteran	33	Patrocínio	Chef			
Gabi Carregosa	Rookie	30	Aracaju	Chef		1	
Irina Cordeiro; 3rd on Profissionais 2	Veteran	38	Natal	Owner chef		1	
João Vieira	Rookie	28	Bom Jardim	Executive chef		1	
Kenzo Shintome	Rookie	30	São Paulo	Cook		1	
Léo Salles; Winner on Confeitaria 2	Veteran	31	São Paulo	Pastry chef and consultant		2	
Léo Santos; 5th on MasterChef 4	Veteran	32	Ribeirão Preto	Pastry chef and consultant		2	
Lubyanka Baltar; 5th on Profissionais 2	Veteran	46	João Pessoa	Executive chef and owner		2	
Miguel Fernandez	Rookie	23	Nova Friburgo	Cook		1	
Pascal Valero	Rookie	55	Carcassone (France)	Chef and consultant		1	
Willian "Will" Peters; Runner-up on Profissionais 3	Veteran	42	Porto Alegre	Chef and consultant		2	
Hugo Merchan; Runner-up on MasterChef 5	Veteran	33	Marília	Cook and bartender	Eliminated on November 10	1	13th
Ieda de Matos	Rookie	54	Utinga	Chef	Eliminated on November 3	2	14th
Marcelo Zaidan; Runner-up on Profissionais 1	Veteran	37	São Paulo	Operations chef	Eliminated on October 27	0	15th
Helena Furtado; 7th on MasterChef 8	Veteran	48	Belo Horizonte	Cook	Eliminated on October 20	0	16th
Mari Marzola	Rookie	38	Ribeirão Preto	Chef	Eliminated on October 13	0	17th
Vinicius Cavalcante	Rookie	41	Vitória	Owner chef	Eliminated on October 6	0	18th

== Elimination table ==
Place	Contestant	Episode																				
Place	Contestant	1		2		3		4	5		6		7	8	9	10	11	12	13	14	15	16
	Daniela	HIGH	IMM	IN	WIN	IN	HIGH	PT	HIGH	IMM	HIGH	IMM										
	Fernanda	LOW	HIGH	IN	LOW	HIGH	IMM	PT	IN	IN	IN	IMM										
	Gabi	LOW	IN	HIGH	IMM	HIGH	IMM	HIGH	LOW	WIN	IN	IMM										
	João	HIGH	IMM	HIGH	IMM	HIGH	IMM	WIN	LOW	IN	HIGH	IMM										
	Kenzo	IN	IMM	HIGH	IMM	HIGH	IMM	PT	HIGH	IMM	WIN	IMM										
	Léo Salles	LOW	WIN	IN	IMM	LOW	LOW	WIN	LOW	HIGH	IN	IMM										
	Léo Santos	IN	IMM	WIN	IMM	IN	IN	WIN	IN	HIGH	HIGH	IMM										
	Lubyanka	HIGH	IMM	IN	IN	IN	IMM	WIN	LOW	LOW	IN	WIN										
	Miguel	LOW	LOW	IN	IN	IN	WIN	NPT	HIGH	IMM	LOW	LOW										
	Pascal	HIGH	IMM	HIGH	IMM	HIGH	IMM	WIN	LOW	IN	LOW	HIGH										
	Will	HIGH	IMM	IN	IMM	IN	IN	WIN	WIN	IMM	LOW	LOW										
12	Irina	WIN	IMM	LOW	HIGH	IN	LOW	LOW	HIGH	IMM	IN	IMM										
13	Hugo	IN	IMM	LOW	HIGH	IN	IMM	WIN	IN	IMM	LOW	ELIM										
14	Ieda	HIGH	IMM	HIGH	IMM	WIN	IMM	WIN	IN	ELIM												
15	Marcelo	HIGH	IMM	IN	IN	LOW	IN	ELIM														
16	Helena	LOW	IN	IN	IMM	LOW	ELIM															
17	Mari	IN	IMM	LOW	ELIM																	
18	Vinicius	IN	ELIM																			

Key

- The cook won MasterChef Profissionais.
- The cook was the runner-up.
- The cook won the individual challenge (Mystery Box or Elimination Test).
- The cook was one of the top entries in the individual challenge but did not win.
- The cook did not have to compete in that round and was safe from elimination.
- The cook was not selected as a top or bottom entry in an individual challenge.
- The cook was one of the bottom entries in the Mystery Box and received a disadvantaged in the Elimination Test.
- The cook is a veteran contestant.
- The cook is a rookie constestant.
- The cook was on the winning team in the Team Challenge.
- The cook was on the losing team in the Team Challenge.
- The cook was one of the bottom entries in an individual challenge but was saved first.
- The cook was one of the bottom entries in an individual challenge but was saved last.
- The cook won the Reinstation Challenge and returned to the competition.
- The cook was not eligible to compete in that round.
- The cook was disqualified from MasterChef Profissionais.
- The cook was eliminated from MasterChef Profissionais.

== Guest appearances ==
Episode 1

- Ana Paula Padrão
- Diego Lozano
- Rodrigo Oliveira

Episode 2

- Facundo Kelemen

Episode 6

- Chris Flores
- Rafael Gomes

== Ratings and reception ==
=== Brazilian ratings ===
All numbers are in points and provided by Kantar Ibope Media.

Episode	Title	Air date	Timeslot (BRT)	SP viewers (in points)	BR viewers (in points)	Ref.
1	Top 18	October 6, 2026	Tuesday 10:30 p.m.	0.9	0.9	
2	Top 17	October 13, 2026	Tuesday 10:30 p.m.	0.8	Outside top 10	
3	Top 16	October 20, 2026	Tuesday 10:30 p.m.	0.8	Outside top 10	
4	Top 15	October 27, 2026	Tuesday 10:30 p.m.	0.6	Outside top 10	
5	Top 14	November 3, 2026	Tuesday 10:30 p.m.	0.6	Outside top 10	
6	Top 13	November 10, 2026	Tuesday 10:30 p.m.	1.0		
7	Top 12	November 17, 2026	Tuesday 10:30 p.m.			
8		November 24, 2026	Tuesday 10:30 p.m.			
9		December 1, 2026	Tuesday 10:30 p.m.			
10		December 8, 2026	Tuesday 10:30 p.m.			
11		December 15, 2026	Tuesday 10:30 p.m.			
12		December 22, 2026	Tuesday 10:30 p.m.			
13		December 29, 2026	Tuesday 10:30 p.m.			
14		January 5, 2027	Tuesday 10:30 p.m.			
15		January 12, 2027	Tuesday 10:30 p.m.			
16	Winner announced	January 19, 2027	Tuesday 10:30 p.m.			

- In 2026, each point represents 277.669 households in 15 market cities in Brazil (78.780 households in São Paulo).
