= MasterChef: The Professionals =

Television competitive cooking show

- Genre: Cooking
- Written by: Franc Roddam
- Judges: Gregg Wallace; Michel Roux Jr. Monica Galetti; Marcus Wareing; Anna Haugh; Matt Tebbutt
- Narrated by: India Fisher; Sean Pertwee
- Country of origin: United Kingdom
- Original language: English
- No. of series: 18
- No. of episodes: 384 (inc. 4 specials)

Production
- Executive producers: Franc Roddam; Elisabeth Murdoch; Carla-Maria Lawson
- Running time: 30–60 minutes
- Production companies: Shine TV and Ziji Productions

Original release
- Network: BBC Two (2008–2019); BBC One (2020–present)
- Release: 25 August 2008 – present

Related
- MasterChef

MasterChef: The Professionals is a BBC television competitive cooking show which aired on BBC Two from 2008 to 2019, transferring to BBC One in 2020. It is a spin-off from the main MasterChef series and features professional working chefs.

Its current presenters are chefs Monica Galetti (since 2009, excepting 2022) and Marcus Wareing (since 2014), with voiceover narration by Sean Pertwee (since 2011).

Its original cast in 2008 consisted of chef Michel Roux Jr. and Gregg Wallace as judges, with India Fisher as voiceover - the last two continuing those roles from the main series. Galetti, then Roux's sous-chef at Le Gavroche, joined in series 2. Roux Jr left the show due to "a conflict in commercial interests" in 2014, replaced by Wareing. Anna Haugh filled in for Galetti for the 2022 (Series 15) season. On 23 March 2023, Galetti announced on Instagram that she would be returning to the show as a judge for the 16th series, which was broadcast from 23 October 2023 onwards. Matt Tebbutt replaced Wallace as a judge in series 18, which aired delayed from its usual schedule in early 2026. For series 19 in late 2026, only Galetti and Wareing judged.

== Format ==
Typically, the show runs for seven weeks and twenty-one episodes (reduced to eighteen for Series 15) transmitted from early November until Christmas (Series 18 was transmitted from early February to Easter) although the precise number of shows per week, number of contestants, the running order and nature of the challenges and the number of chefs eliminated at each round has varied from series to series. There are four weeks of "heats" (the final show of each week being a quarter final), a "knockout" week, a semi-final week and a finals week. Below is a synopsis of a typical series:

=== Heats ===
Each heat week begins with six chefs per show (this was cut to four per show in Series 15). The three (or four) remaining chefs then participate in the quarter-final at the end of that week.

- Skills test (Series 2 onwards): The professional judges demonstrate the preparation of a specific dish, or the preparation of an ingredient. The contestant is then required to reproduce that dish in a specific time limit – typically 15–20 minutes. The judges then taste the contestant's attempt and give feedback. In Series 2–4, Monica Galetti would eliminate 2 of the 6 contestants at this stage, meaning only four went through to cook for Michel Roux Jr. On Series 18, previous winners and finalists designed the skills test, and participated in the judging.
- Signature dish: The contestants are then given one hour to prepare their signature dish which will showcase their skills and abilities. This is then scrutinised by the judges, who then eliminate three of the six (two of the four from Series 15 onward) contestants, based on their performance in both this, and the skills test. From Series 15 the chefs had to cook a main course and dessert instead of one dish.

=== Quarter final ===
- Invention test: The three surviving contestants from the heat are given 1 hour to invent a dish from a set larder of ingredients. The contestants are then given feedback. In Series 1 the invention test took place during the heats (before being replaced in Series 2 by the Skills Test, with the invention test being moved to the quarter-final). In some series four chefs competed in this round, which was reduced to three in the next round.
- Cook for the critics: The four (or three) contestants are required to prepare a three-course meal for a panel of three restaurant critics – typically Jay Rayner, Tom Parker-Bowles, William Sitwell, Grace Dent, Leyla Kazim and Jimi Famurewa. The meal is also sampled by the professional judges (but not Gregg Wallace). The contestants do not get feedback from the critics directly. Based on this challenge and performance in the invention test, one chef is eliminated, and the remainder go through to knockout week or the semi-final

=== Knockout Week ===
Typically 12 chefs are left by this stage. The precise challenges have varied over the series. In Series 15, Knockout Week was dropped and the competition progressed directly to the semi-final, but it reappeared in Series 16 onwards.

- Knowledge test (Series 1–7): Michel Roux Jr or Marcus Wareing demonstrates the preparation of a classic dish which requires a high degree of technical skill and ability. The chefs are then required to reproduce the dish themselves using only a basic recipe lacking in precise details of the cooking methods involved. Typically, the larder supplied included "rogue" ingredients that were not actually used in the dish, intended to probe the contestants' palates and knowledge of flavours.
- Cook for a guest chef (Series 1–6): The contestants are required to cook a dish for a mystery renowned chef who visits the MasterChef kitchen (in Series 5 & 6 this was Marcus Wareing). The guest chef did not participate in the usual judging discussion between Roux and Wallace, and it would result in an elimination.
- Invention test with a difference (Series 5–6, 8): The chefs are required to invent a single dish, but must only use basic cooking methods, for instance they are prohibited from using the sous-vide cookers. In Series 6, three of the chefs gained automatic passage into the next round, whilst the remaining three must cook off against each other to avoid elimination, where one chef was eliminated.
- Mass catering (Series 8): The chefs are divided up into two teams where they have to demonstrate their ability to cook low cost, high quality dishes in large quantity in a short timeframe. Typically they are sent to a large workplace canteen, or a major sporting event. This is then followed by a cook-off in the studio in which one further chef is eliminated.

=== Semi-finals ===
- Service in a top restaurant: The six surviving contestants are divided into either pairs or teams of three and are each sent to work in an acclaimed British restaurant under the supervision of the Head Chef, or Chef Patron and work a lunch service. The chefs must then prepare the restaurant's signature dish, and then receive feedback from the Chef Patron on their interpretation of the dish. They then return to the MasterChef Kitchen were they cook against each other, and one chef is eliminated, based on their performance in the cook-off, and from the feedback from the restaurant test.
- Invention with leftovers: The five remaining chefs are presented with scraps of food along with a basic larder and are instructed to produce a dish using them. One further chef is eliminated at the end of this round.
- Pop-Up Restaurant Eight chefs (four chefs in two episodes) must design their own pop-up restaurant and run a service for a panel of critics consisting of other pop-up restaurateurs. After the challenge, the chefs return to the MasterChef kitchen for a cook-off where one is eliminated, leaving six chefs going into Finals Week.

=== Finals Week ===
- Showstopping dish: The six surviving contestants are asked to produce a high quality dish that will showcase their knowledge and skill, and justify their presence in the final. Two are eliminated here to leave the final four.
- Chef's table: The four surviving contestants are required to work as a team to cook a banquet for a party of top British chefs, most of whom possess Michelin stars. Each chef is given responsibility for a course (starter, fish, main, dessert). At the end of each course, one of the guest chefs gives the contestant feedback. The chefs return to the MasterChef kitchen where they cook off against each other and one is eliminated to leave the final three.
- Michelin starred restaurant: (Series 1-14, 16-) The remaining three finalists are sent to a restaurant of international acclaim, either in the UK or abroad, which typically holds the coveted 3 Michelin stars. The chefs participate in a lunch service in that restaurant, and learn how to cook the establishment's signature dishes and receive guidance from the Chef Patron. They also create their own dishes using the same techniques used in that restaurant.
- Cook for the Critics II, (Replaced the 'three starred restaurant' challenge in Series 15), the four chefs competed in a two stage challenge where they cooked off against each other by preparing a showstopping dish based on an exotic place they had been to, then each had to prepare a three course meal for the same panel of critics from the quarter-finals.
- Final cook-off: Returning to the MasterChef kitchen, the three finalists are given two hours to cook a three course meal for the MasterChef judges where one will be crowned Champion for the series.

== Winners ==
The winners were:

2008: Derek Johnstone
2009: Steve Groves
2010: Claire Lara
2011: Ash Mair
2012: Keri Moss and Anton Piotrowski
2013: Steven Edwards
2014: Jamie Scott
2015: Mark Stinchcombe
2016: Gary Maclean
2017: Craig Johnston
2018: Laurence Henry
2019: Stu Deeley
2020: Alex Webb
2021: Dan Lee
2022: Nikita Pathakji
2023: Tom Hamblet
2024: Dan Merriman
2026: Gareth Baty

== Transmissions ==
=== Regular series ===
Series	Start date	End date	Episodes
1	25 August 2008	19 September 2008	20
2	14 September 2009	22 October 2009	29
3	27 September 2010	2 November 2010	17
4	7 November 2011	15 December 2011	24
5	5 November 2012	13 December 2012	24
6	4 November 2013	12 December 2013	24
7	4 November 2014	23 December 2014	21
8	10 November 2015	24 December 2015	21
9	8 November 2016	22 December 2016	21
10	7 November 2017	21 December 2017	21
11	6 November 2018	20 December 2018	21
12	5 November 2019	19 December 2019	21
13	10 November 2020	17 December 2020	18
14	8 November 2021	16 December 2021	22
15	2 November 2022	11 December 2022	18
16	23 October 2023	8 December 2023	21
17	29 October 2024	12 December 2024	21
18	10 February 2026	26 March 2026	21
19	3 November 2026	18 December 2026	21

=== Specials ===
- MasterChef: The Professionals: Michel's Classics – 30 minute master class episodes; aired 8 November 2010, 9 and 16 December 2011, 17–18 December 2012
- MasterChef: The Professionals Uncovered – A look at the highs and lows of the past five series; aired 27 February 2013
- Masterchef: The Professionals Rematch – Five finalists return to the kitchen to show the judges how much their food has evolved; aired 27 December 2018 and 23 December 2019
- MasterChef: The Professionals: A Festive Knockout – Four of the most memorable chefs from previous series return to show how their skills have progressed since they took part in the show; 2 episodes; aired 29 and 30 December 2020.

== International versions ==
Legend: Still in production No longer airing

Country	Name	Host(s)	Judges	Network	Air dates
Australia	MasterChef Australia: The Professionals	Matt Preston; Marco Pierre White	Matt Preston; Marco Pierre White; Guest judge	Network Ten	20 January 2013 – 17 March 2013 (Season 1)
Brazil	MasterChef Profissionais	Ana Paula Padrão	Erick Jacquin; Paola Carosella; Henrique Fogaça; Helena Rizzo	Band	4 October 2016 – 13 December 2016 (Season 1); 5 September 2017 – 5 December 2017 (Season 2); 21 August 2018 – 11 December 2018 (Season 3); 13 September 2022 – 8 November 2022 (Season 4)
Paraguay	MasterChef Profesionales	Paola Maltese	Nicolás Bo; Eugenia Aquino; José Torrijos	Telefuturo	9 September 2019 – 23 December 2019 (Season 1)
Thailand	MasterChef The Professionals Thailand มาสเตอร์เชฟ เดอะโปรเฟสชั่นแนลส์ ไทยแลนด์	Piyathida Mittiraroch	Pasan Sawasdiwat; Kwantip Devakula; Pongtawat Chalermkittichai	Channel 7	9 February 2025 – 1 June 2025
Ukraine	MasterChef. Profesionaly; МастерШеф. Професіонали	Hector Jimenez-Bravo; Yelyzaveta Hlinska; Volodymyr Yaroslavskiy		STB	2 March – 1 June 2019 (Season 1) 29 February – 18 July 2020 (Season 2)

== See also ==
- MasterChef
- Junior MasterChef
