= MasterChef (Brazilian TV series) season 13 =

MasterChef
- Season 13
- Judges: Érick Jacquin; Helena Rizzo; Henrique Fogaça
- No. of contestants: 18
- Winner: Jéssica
- Runner-up: Carla
- No. of episodes: 19

Release
- Original network: Band
- Original release: May 26 – September 29, 2026

Season chronology
- ← Previous; Season 12

The thirteenth season of the Brazilian competitive reality television series MasterChef premiered on May 26, 2026, at 10:30 / 9:30 p.m. (BRT / AMT) on Band.

Érick Jacquin, Helena Rizzo, and Henrique Fogaça returned as judges.

The grand prize is R$300,000 in cash, a scholarship at Le Cordon Bleu, a cultural and gastronomic immersion experience in Lisbon, Portugal, courtesy of Nomad, a R$30,000 Havan shopping voucher and the MasterChef trophy. The runner-up receives a pâtisserie course at Le Cordon Bleu.

Firefighter Jéssica Cechella won the competition over family physician Carla Araújo on September 29, 2026.

== Contestants ==
On May 16, 2026, the production of MasterChef released the list of the 24 contestants selected to compete in the audition stage. The first two episodes featured the audition rounds, with three contestants eliminated in each episode. The remaining 18 contestants officially received the MasterChef apron and advanced to the main competition.

=== Top 18 ===
Contestant	Age	Hometown	Occupation	Result	Winnings	Finish
Jéssica Cechella	32	Criciúma	Firefighter	Winner on September 29	7	1st
Carla Araújo	31	Petrolina	Family physician	Runner-up on September 29	9	2nd
Rodrigo Quadros	33	Teresina	Dentist	Eliminated on September 22	5	3rd
Maria Eduarda Lima	21	Mogi das Cruzes	Interior designer	Eliminated on September 22	5	4th
Jesuíno Archanjo	60	Americana	Fashion designer	Eliminated on September 22	3	5th
Gabriela Peixoto	31	Salvador	Obstetrician	Eliminated on September 15	8	6th
Patric Gomes	36	Porto Velho	Environmental engineer	Eliminated on September 8	4	7th
Aline Oliveira	46	Belo Horizonte	Homemaker	Eliminated on September 1	7	8th
Nuri Eftekhar	29	Campinas	Entrepreneur	Eliminated on August 25	5	9th
Taís Evaristo	32	São Paulo	Influencer	Eliminated on August 18	4	10th
Everaldo Akihyto	27	Castanhal	Industrial consultant	Eliminated on August 11	4	11th
Aline Oliveira	46	Belo Horizonte	Homemaker	Eliminated on July 28	5	Returned on August 4
Maria Antônia "Amélia" do Carmo	26	Ubá	Content creator & musician	Eliminated on July 21	4	12th
Reinaldo Bockor	47	Canoinhas	Biomedical scientist	Eliminated on July 14	2	13th
Larissa Sankauskas	22	São Bernardo do Campo	Automotive assembler	Eliminated on July 7	1	14th
Matheus Monteiro	27	Goiânia	Hunter & animal science specialist	Eliminated on June 30	2	15th
Júlia Pitzer	31	Rio de Janeiro	Gamer & content creator	Eliminated on June 23	1	16th
Marcelo Pereira	24	Ipatinga	Journalism student	Eliminated on June 16	1	17th
Giovanni Trevisan	31	São Luís	Production engineer	Eliminated on June 9	1	18th

=== Top 24 ===
Contestant	Age	Hometown	Occupation	Result	Winnings	Finish
Pablo Souza	37	Presidente Prudente	Footwear designer	Eliminated on June 2	0	19th
Mariana Martinez	27	Curitiba	Art director	Eliminated on June 2	0	20th
Gabriel Bortolazi	32	São Paulo	Entrepreneur	Eliminated on June 2	0	21st
Felipe Millk	23	Cosmópolis	Pharmacist	Eliminated on May 26	0	22nd
Giovana Chaluppe	25	São Paulo	Advertising professional	Eliminated on May 26	0	23rd
Victor Hugo Rezende	18	Franca	Student	Eliminated on May 26	0	24th

== Elimination table ==
Place	Contestant	Episode																																	
Place	Contestant	1			2	3		4		5	6		7	8		9	10		11		12		13		14		15		16		17		18		19
1	Jéssica	IN		IMM	WIN	HIGH	IMM	HIGH	IMM	PT	IN	IMM	WIN	IN	WIN	LOW	WIN	IMM	IMM		LOW	HIGH	HIGH	IMM	IN	WIN	LOW	LOW	HIGH	HIGH	WIN	IMM	WIN	IMM	WINNER
2	Carla	HIGH		IMM	WIN	HIGH	IMM	LOW	HIGH	WIN	WIN	IMM	WIN	LOW	LOW	LOW	IN	LOW	IMM		WIN	IMM	IN	WIN	HIGH	IMM	HIGH	IMM	LOW	WIN	IN	WIN	HIGH	WIN	RUNNER-UP
3	Rodrigo		WIN	IMM	PT1	HIGH	IMM	IN	IMM	HIGH	HIGH	IMM	WIN	HIGH	IMM	WIN	LOW	HIGH	IMM		IN	WIN	LOW	LOW	LOW	IN	WIN	IMM	IN	IN	IN	LOW	LOW	ELIM	
4	Maria Eduarda		WIN	IMM	PT1	IN	WIN	IN	IN	PT	HIGH	IMM	PT	IN	LOW	PT	WIN	IMM	IMM		LOW	LOW	WIN	IMM	IN	HIGH	WIN	IMM	IN	LOW	IN	LOW	HIGH	ELIM	
5	Jesuíno	HIGH		IMM	PT1	IN	IN	HIGH	IMM	LOW	IN	HIGH	HIGH	IN	IMM	PT	LOW	WIN	IMM		LOW	IN	LOW	IN	WIN	IMM	WIN	IMM	LOW	LOW	IN	IN	ELIM		
6	Gabriela	WIN		IMM	PT1	IN	IN	IN	IMM	WIN	IN	IN	LOW	LOW	HIGH	WIN	WIN	IMM	IMM		WIN	IMM	WIN	IMM	LOW	LOW	LOW	WIN	WIN	IMM	IN	ELIM			
7	Patric	IN		IMM	WIN	WIN	IMM	IN	IMM	WIN	LOW	HIGH	WIN	IN	HIGH	HIGH	IN	LOW	IMM		HIGH	IMM	HIGH	HIGH	LOW	HIGH	LOW	LOW	LOW	ELIM					
8	Aline	WIN		IMM	WIN	LOW	HIGH	IN	WIN	WIN	IN	IN	PT	HIGH	IMM	WIN	LOW	ELIM	WIN	RET	HIGH	IMM	LOW	IN	HIGH	IMM	LOW	ELIM							
9	Nuri		IN	IMM	PT1	LOW	LOW	HIGH	IMM	WIN	IN	WIN	WIN	IN	IMM	WIN	WIN	IMM	IMM		IN	IN	IN	LOW	IN	ELIM									
10	Taís	IN		IMM	PT1	HIGH	IMM	LOW	LOW	NPT	IN	HIGH	WIN	WIN	IMM	WIN	LOW	IN	IMM		WIN	IMM	LOW	ELIM											
11	Everaldo		IN	WIN	WIN	IN	IMM	HIGH	IMM	WIN	LOW	IN	LOW	HIGH	IMM	WIN	IN	IN	IMM		LOW	ELIM													
12	Maria		WIN	IMM	WIN	IN	IMM	IN	IN	WIN	HIGH	IMM	WIN	LOW	HIGH	ELIM																			
13	Reinaldo		HIGH	IMM	PT3	IN	IMM	WIN	IMM	WIN	IN	LOW	HIGH	IN	ELIM																				
14	Larissa	WIN		IMM	PT1	HIGH	IMM	HIGH	IMM	LOW	IN	IMM	ELIM																						
15	Matheus		LOW	IMM	WIN	IN	LOW	IN	LOW	WIN	LOW	ELIM																							
16	Júlia	LOW		IMM	WIN	IN	IMM	LOW	HIGH	ELIM																									
17	Marcelo		HIGH	IMM	WIN	LOW	IN	LOW	ELIM																										
18	Giovanni		HIGH	IMM	WIN	IN	ELIM																												
Auditions
19	Pablo		IN	IMM	ELIM																														
20	Mariana	HIGH		IMM	ELIM																														
21	Gabriel		IN	IMM	ELIM																														
22	Felipe	LOW		ELIM																															
23	Giovana	LOW		ELIM																															
24	Victor Hugo		LOW	ELIM																															

Key

- The cook won MasterChef 13.
- The cook was the runner-up.
- The cook won the individual challenge (Mystery Box or Elimination Test).
- The cook was one of the top entries in the individual challenge but did not win.
- The cook did not have to compete in that round and was safe from elimination.
- The cook was not selected as a top or bottom entry in an individual challenge.
- The cook was on the red team in the Auditions
- The cook was on the blue team in the Auditions
- The cook was on the yellow team in the Auditions
- The cook was on the green team in the Auditions
- The cook was one of the bottom entries in the Mystery Box and received a disadvantaged in the Elimination Test.
- The cook was on the winning team in the Team Challenge.
- The cook was on the losing team in the Team Challenge.
- The cook was one of the bottom entries in an individual challenge but was saved first.
- The cook was one of the bottom entries in an individual challenge but was saved last.
- The cook won the Reinstation Challenge and returned to the competition.
- The cook was not eligible to compete in that round.
- The cook was eliminated from MasterChef 13.

== Guest appearances ==
Episode 2

- 12 Band's Journalists

Episode 6

- Chef Dayse Paparoto
- Chef Adriano Kanashiro

Episode 7

- Jiang Pu
- Gloria Pai
- Teresa Yi Jun Cai
- Chef Alê Costa

Episode 9

- Márcio Mendes (Trio Los Angeles)
- Ronnie Von
- Sandra de Sá
- Chef Edson Leite

Episode 10

- Gilmelândia

Episode 12

- Chef Leo Salles

Episode 13

- Chef Diego Lozano
- Chef Ronaldo Villar

Episode 14

- Chef Heaven Delhaye
- Paul Cabannes
- Chef Diego Sacilotto
- Pri Matta

Episode 15

- Chef Rodrigo Oliveira
- Chef Bárbara Frazão

Episode 16

- Chef Bel Coelho

== Ratings and reception ==
=== Brazilian ratings ===
All numbers are in points and provided by Kantar Ibope Media.

Episode	Title	Air date	Timeslot (BRT)	SP viewers (in points)	BR viewers (in points)	Ref.
1	Top 24 – Auditions (1)	May 26, 2026	Tuesday 10:30 p.m.	1.3	1.1	
2	Top 21 – Auditions (2)	June 2, 2026	Tuesday 10:30 p.m.	1.6	1.0	
3	Top 18	June 9, 2026	Tuesday 10:30 p.m.	1.0	1.0	
4	Top 17	June 16, 2026	Tuesday 10:30 p.m.	1.4	1.0	
5	Top 16	June 23, 2026	Tuesday 10:30 p.m.	1.3	0.9	
6	Top 15	June 30, 2026	Tuesday 10:30 p.m.	0.8	Outside top 10	
7	Top 14	July 7, 2026	Tuesday 10:30 p.m.	1.3	1.0	
8	Top 13	July 14, 2026	Tuesday 10:30 p.m.	1.2	1.1	
9	Top 12	July 21, 2026	Tuesday 10:30 p.m.	1.5	1.2	
10	Top 11	July 28, 2026	Tuesday 10:30 p.m.	1.5	1.2	
11	Reinstation challenge	August 4, 2026	Tuesday 10:30 p.m.	1.1	1.0	
12	Top 11 Redux	August 11, 2026	Tuesday 10:30 p.m.	1.3	1.2	
13	Top 10	August 18, 2026	Tuesday 10:30 p.m.	1.1	1.0	
14	Top 9	August 25, 2026	Tuesday 10:30 p.m.	1.3	1.1	
15	Top 8	September 1, 2026	Tuesday 10:30 p.m.	1.2	1.1	
16	Top 7	September 8, 2026	Tuesday 10:30 p.m.	1.3	0.9	
17	Top 6	September 15, 2026	Tuesday 10:30 p.m.	1.2	Outside top 10	
18	Top 5	September 22, 2026	Tuesday 10:30 p.m.	1.0	1.0	
19	Winner announced	September 29, 2026	Tuesday 10:30 p.m.	0.9	Outside top 10	

- In 2026, each point represents 277.669 households in 15 market cities in Brazil (78.780 households in São Paulo).
