= MasterChef (Brazilian TV series) season 11 =

MasterChef
- Season 11
- Presented by: Ana Paula Padrão
- Judges: Érick Jacquin; Helena Rizzo; Henrique Fogaça
- No. of contestants: 23
- Winner: José Roberto
- Runner-up: Giorgia
- No. of episodes: 25

Release
- Original network: Band; Discovery Home & Health; Discovery+ HBO Max
- Original release: May 28 – November 12, 2024

Season chronology
- ← Previous; Season 10 Next → Season 12

The eleventh season of the Brazilian competitive reality television series MasterChef premiered on May 28, 2024, at 10:30 / 9:30 p.m. (BRT / AMT) on Band.

Ana Paula Padrão returned as the host, while Érick Jacquin and Helena Rizzo also returned as judges. This season marks the return of Henrique Fogaça as judge.

The grand prize is R$350.000 courtesy by Stone, a scholarship on Le Cordon Bleu, a special cookware set by Royal Prestige, R$50.000 in products by Camicado, a store Seu Espresso by Aram, a gourmand kitchen offered by Brastemp and the MasterChef trophy.

Analyst José Roberto Gomes won the competition over journalist Giorgia Paladini on November 12, 2024.

== Contestants ==
=== Top 23 ===
Contestant	Age	Hometown	Occupation	Result	Winnings	Finish
José Roberto Gomes	46	Natal	Analyst	Winner on November 12	9	1st
Giorgia Paladini	24	Blumenau	Journalist	Runner-up on November 12	12	2nd
Andréia Kaupe	44	Caxias do Sul	Financial manager	Eliminated on November 5	9	3rd
Laura Melo	23	Vitória	Nutritionist	Eliminated on November 5	10	3rd
Vitor Bittar	29	Juiz de Fora	Doctor	Eliminated on November 5	7	3rd
Pâmela Meirelles	42	Campinas	Photographer	Eliminated on October 29	11	6th
Vinícius de Oliveira	31	São Paulo	General manager	Eliminated on October 22	9	7th
Larissa Porto	25	Governador Celso Ramos	Manicurist	Eliminated on October 15	7	8th
Gabriela Paveloski	28	Bauru	Bartender & sommelier	Eliminated on October 8	7	9th
Roberto Icizuca	55	São Paulo	Advertiser	Eliminated on October 1	8	10th
João Vitor Klausem	23	Governador Celso Ramos	Communicator	Eliminated on September 24	6	11th
Pietro Ferrari	27	São Paulo	Company administrator	Eliminated on September 17	6	12th
Gabriela Cunha	35	Goiânia	Hairdresser	Eliminated on September 10	6	13th
Lucas Casertani	29	São Paulo	Designer & art director	Eliminated on September 3	4	14th
Alzileide Gomes	40	Manaus	School inspector	Eliminated on August 20	3	15th
Andreia Kaupe	44	Caxias do Sul	Financial manager	Eliminated on August 13	5	Returned on August 27
Larissa Porto	25	Governador Celso Ramos	Manicurist	Eliminated on August 6	2	Returned on August 27
Karine Porto	34	Belo Horizonte	Designer	Eliminated on July 30	3	16th
Juan Cariuchi	27	Petrópolis	Biologist & nutritionist	Eliminated on July 23	0	17th
Thaissa Bechomura	33	Rio de Janeiro	Stylist & artist	Eliminated on July 16	2	18th
Renata Britto	54	Itutinga	Housewife	Eliminated on July 9	1	19th
Thais Fernanda	29	Cunha Porã	Forensic radiologist	Eliminated on July 2	1	20th
José Jefferson Gomes	34	Surubim	Teacher & artist	Eliminated on June 25	0	21st
Riad Altinawi	21	Damascus, Syria	Medicine student	Eliminated on June 18	0	22nd
Rafaela Carvalho	36	Salvador	Nutritionist	Eliminated on June 11	0	23rd

== Elimination table ==
Place	Contestant	Episode																																														
Place	Contestant	3			4			5	6		7			8	9			10	11		12		13				14		15	16			17	18				19		20	21	22		23		24		25
1	José Roberto	IMM			HIGH	IMM		WIN	WIN	IMM	IN	WIN	IMM	PT	HIGH	IMM		HIGH	IN	IN	HIGH	IMM	IN	IN	IN	LOW	IMM		WIN	IN	IN	LOW	HIGH	IN	WIN	IMM		LOW	HIGH	PT	WIN	LOW	LOW	WIN	IMM	IN	WIN	WINNER
2	Giorgia	IMM			LOW	BAN	WIN	WIN	LOW	IN	HIGH	IMM		HIGH	IN	WIN	IMM	WIN	HIGH	IMM	IN	IN	IN	WIN	IMM				WIN	IN	IN	WIN	WIN	HIGH	IMM			WIN	IMM	WIN	WIN	LOW	LOW	HIGH	HIGH	IN	WIN	RUNNER-UP
3	Andréia	WIN	IMM					LOW	LOW	WIN	IN	BAN	HIGH	WIN	IN	WIN	IMM	WIN	IN	IN	LOW	ELIM					WIN	RET	PT	HIGH	IMM		LOW	IN	IN	IN	WIN	IN	IN	WIN	HIGH	LOW	WIN	IN	LOW	IN	ELIM	
3	Laura	IN	BAN	IN	IMM			PT	LOW	IN	WIN	IMM		WIN	WIN	IMM		PT	IN	LOW	LOW	LOW	LOW	BAN	WIN	IMM			WIN	IN	IN	HIGH	WIN	WIN	IMM			IN	LOW	WIN	LOW	WIN	IMM	IN	WIN	IN	ELIM	
3	Vitor	IN	IN	IN	IMM			PT	LOW	IN	HIGH	IMM		WIN	LOW	BAN	LOW	WIN	LOW	WIN	IN	LOW	IN	WIN	IMM				HIGH	HIGH	IMM		WIN	HIGH	IMM			IN	LOW	PT	WIN	WIN	IMM	IN	LOW	IN	ELIM	
6	Pâmela	IMM			IN	WIN	IMM	WIN	LOW	HIGH	IN	WIN	IMM	WIN	IN	WIN	IMM	WIN	IN	IN	HIGH	IMM	WIN	IMM					WIN	LOW	BAN	IN	WIN	HIGH	IMM			IN	WIN	LOW	WIN	LOW	HIGH	IN	ELIM			
7	Vinícius	IMM			HIGH	IMM		WIN	LOW	LOW	IN	IN	WIN	LOW	IN	IN	WIN	LOW	IN	IN	HIGH	IMM	LOW	BAN	WIN	IMM			WIN	WIN	IMM		PT	LOW	BAN	WIN	IMM	IN	IN	WIN	WIN	LOW	ELIM					
8	Larissa	LOW	BAN	LOW	IMM			HIGH	LOW	HIGH	IN	IN	LOW	WIN	HIGH	IMM		WIN	LOW	ELIM							WIN	RET	WIN	LOW	BAN	LOW	WIN	IN	IN	WIN	IMM	WIN	IMM	HIGH	ELIM							
9	Gabriela P.	IN	IN	WIN	IMM			NPT	WIN	IMM	HIGH	IMM		WIN	HIGH	IMM		WIN	IN	HIGH	LOW	HIGH	IN	IN	IN	WIN	IMM		PT	IN	BAN	HIGH	WIN	IN	WIN	IMM		LOW	HIGH	ELIM								
10	Roberto	IMM			WIN	IMM		WIN	LOW	HIGH	IN	WIN	IMM	PT	LOW	BAN	HIGH	WIN	HIGH	IMM	HIGH	IMM	HIGH	IMM					WIN	IN	WIN	IMM	WIN	LOW	BAN	WIN	IMM	IN	ELIM									
11	João Vitor	IMM			IN	BAN	IN	WIN	WIN	IMM	IN	IN	HIGH	LOW	LOW	BAN	HIGH	PT	WIN	IMM	IN	IN	IN	IN	IN	WIN	IMM		WIN	IN	WIN	IMM	HIGH	IN	IN	IN	ELIM											
12	Pietro	HIGH	IMM					WIN	WIN	IMM	LOW	BAN	IN	WIN	IN	IN	IN	WIN	LOW	HIGH	LOW	WIN	HIGH	IMM					LOW	IN	WIN	IMM	ELIM															
13	Gabriela C.	IMM			HIGH	IMM		WIN	WIN	IMM	IN	WIN	IMM	WIN	HIGH	IMM		HIGH	HIGH	IMM	WIN	IMM	IN	IN	WIN	IMM			PT	LOW	BAN	ELIM																
14	Lucas	HIGH	IMM					PT	WIN	IMM	LOW	BAN	LOW	WIN	IN	IN	LOW	WIN	HIGH	IMM	IN	HIGH	IN	WIN	IMM				ELIM																			
15	Alzileide	IMM			LOW	BAN	HIGH	WIN	WIN	IMM	LOW	BAN	IN	PT	IN	BAN	IN	PT	IN	IN	WIN	IMM	LOW	BAN	IN	ELIM																						
16	Karine	IMM			IN	IN	HIGH	WIN	LOW	IN	IN	WIN	IMM	WIN	IN	IN	HIGH	ELIM																														
17	Juan	HIGH	IMM					LOW	LOW	LOW	IN	IN	IN	HIGH	LOW	BAN	ELIM																															
18	Thaissa	IN	WIN	IMM				PT	WIN	IMM	LOW	BAN	IN	ELIM																																		
19	Renata	IN	IN	HIGH	IMM			PT	WIN	IMM	IN	IN	ELIM																																			
20	Thais	IMM			LOW	BAN	LOW	WIN	LOW	ELIM																																						
21	José Jefferson	LOW	BAN	LOW	IMM			ELIM																																								
22	Riad	IMM			IN	IN	ELIM																																									
23	Rafaela	LOW	BAN	ELIM																																												

Key

- The cook won MasterChef 11.
- The cook was the runner-up.
- The cook won the individual challenge (Mystery Box or Elimination Test).
- The cook was one of the top entries in the individual challenge but did not win.
- The cook did not have to compete in that round and was safe from elimination.
- The cook was not selected as a top or bottom entry in an individual challenge.
- The cook was one of the bottom entries in the Mystery Box and received a disadvantaged in the Elimination Test.
- The cook was on the winning team in the Team Challenge.
- The cook was on the losing team in the Team Challenge.
- The cook was one of the bottom entries in an individual challenge but was saved first.
- The cook was one of the bottom entries in an individual challenge but was saved last.
- The cook won the Reinstation Challenge and returned to the competition.
- The cook was not eligible to compete in that round.
- The cook had to withdraw from the competition.
- The cook was eliminated from MasterChef 11.

== Guest appearances ==
Episode 1

- Carlinhos Maia
- Jon Vlogs
- Tainá Costa
- Arthur Paek
- Luiza Possi
- Sobrevivente
- Gkay
- Leonardo Bagarolo

Episode 2

- Juju Salimeni
- Vittor Fernando
- Matheus Costa
- Jooj Natu and Oli Natu
- Esse Menino
- Enaldinho
- Cátia Damasceno
- Chef Rodrigo Oliveira

Episode 3

- Blogueirinha

Episode 4

- Nicole Bahls

Episode 5

- Álvaro
- Lucas Rangel
- Arnaldo Lorençato
- Franklin Bin
- Philippe Brye

Episode 7

- Christian Figueiredo
- Zoo

Episode 8

- Craque Neto
- Chef Alê Costa

Episode 9

- Boo Unzueta
- Tata Cocielo

Episode 11

- Pequena Lo

Episode 15

- Hugo Gloss

Episode 17

- Bruna Thedy
- Chef Alê Costa

Episode 21

- Arthur Paek
- Jessilane Alves
- Letícia Fonseca
- Other 37 Fogaça's guests

Episode 22

- Thiago Gatto
- Imaculada Soares
- Eduardo Mauad
- Juliana Nicoli
- José Sergio da Silva
- Fernanda Oliveira
- Stephanie Etzel

== Ratings and reception ==
=== Brazilian ratings ===
All numbers are in points and provided by Kantar Ibope Media.

Episode	Title	Air date	Timeslot (BRT)	SP viewers (in points)	BR viewers (in points)	Ref.
1	Auditions – Duels (1)	May 28, 2024	Tuesday 10:30 p.m.	2.3	1.5	
2	Auditions – Duels (2)	June 4, 2024	Tuesday 10:30 p.m.	1.5	1.3	
3	Top 23	June 11, 2024	Tuesday 10:30 p.m.	1.8	1.3	
4	Top 22	June 18, 2024	Tuesday 10:30 p.m.	1.8	1.5	
5	Top 21	June 25, 2024	Tuesday 10:30 p.m.	2.0	1.5	
6	Top 20	July 2, 2024	Tuesday 10:30 p.m.	1.7	1.1	
7	Top 19	July 9, 2024	Tuesday 10:30 p.m.	2.2	1.3	
8	Top 18	July 16, 2024	Tuesday 10:30 p.m.	1.8	1.4	
9	Top 17	July 23, 2024	Tuesday 10:30 p.m.	1.4	1.3	
10	Top 16	July 30, 2024	Tuesday 10:30 p.m.	1.6	1.2	
11	Top 15	August 6, 2024	Tuesday 10:30 p.m.	1.8	1.1	
12	Top 14	August 13, 2024	Tuesday 10:30 p.m.	1.9	1.3	
13	Top 13	August 20, 2024	Tuesday 10:30 p.m.	1.9	1.4	
14	Reinstation challenge	August 27, 2024	Tuesday 10:30 p.m.	1.9	1.4	
15	Top 14 Redux	September 3, 2024	Tuesday 10:30 p.m.	2.2	1.4	
16	Top 13 Redux	September 10, 2024	Tuesday 10:30 p.m.	1.6	1.2	
17	Top 12	September 17, 2024	Tuesday 10:30 p.m.	1.6	1.2	
18	Top 11	September 24, 2024	Tuesday 10:30 p.m.	1.3	1.1	
19	Top 10	October 1, 2024	Tuesday 10:30 p.m.	1.7	1.3	
20	Top 9	October 8, 2024	Tuesday 10:30 p.m.	1.9	1.3	
21	Top 8	October 15, 2024	Tuesday 10:30 p.m.	1.3	Outside top 10	
22	Top 7	October 22, 2024	Tuesday 10:30 p.m.	1.7	Outside top 10	
23	Top 6	October 29, 2024	Tuesday 10:30 p.m.	1.7	1.3	
24	Top 5	November 5, 2024	Tuesday 10:30 p.m.	1.3	Outside top 10	
25	Winner announced	November 12, 2024	Tuesday 10:30 p.m.	2.1	1.5	

- In 2024, each point represents 253.273 households in 15 market cities in Brazil (73.279 households in São Paulo).
