= MasterChef (Brazilian TV series) season 12 =

MasterChef
- Season 12
- Judges: Érick Jacquin; Helena Rizzo; Henrique Fogaça
- No. of contestants: 18
- Winner: Daniela
- Runner-up: Felipe Bruzzi
- No. of episodes: 15

Release
- Original network: Band; Discovery Home & Health; Discovery+ HBO Max
- Original release: May 27 – September 2, 2025

Season chronology
- ← Previous; Season 11 Next → Season 13

The twelfth season of the Brazilian competitive reality television series MasterChef premiered on May 27, 2025, at 10:30 / 9:30 p.m. (BRT / AMT) on Band.

Érick Jacquin, Helena Rizzo, and Henrique Fogaça returned as judges. Ana Paula Padrão did not return as host and was not replaced; instead, her role was jointly assumed by the three judges, while actress Bruna Thedy took over the show's narration and voice-overs, previously done by Padrão in past seasons.

The grand prize is R$350.000, a scholarship on Le Cordon Bleu, R$50.000 courtesy by iFood plus a specialized consultancy for the winner's future restaurant, a shop card on Havan worth R$30.000, R$100.000 courtesy by Asaas and the MasterChef trophy.

Lawyer Daniela Dantas won the competition over barman Felipe Bruzzi on September 2, 2025.

== Contestants ==
=== Top 18 ===
Contestant	Age	Hometown	Occupation	Result	Winnings	Finish
Daniela Dantas	49	Petrópolis	Lawyer	Winner on September 2	7	1st
Felipe Bruzzi	33	Rio de Janeiro	Barman	Runner-up on September 2	6	2nd
Gloria Pai	66	Hong Kong	Language teacher	Eliminated on August 26	4	3rd
Rodrigo Pedroza	35	Volta Redonda	Merchant	Eliminated on August 26	7	4th
Leonela Borges	29	Santa Bárbara	Lawyer	Eliminated on August 19	3	5th
Guilherme Pennacchia	19	São Paulo	Student	Eliminated on August 19	4	6th
Fernanda Colombo	34	Criciúma	Football referee	Eliminated on August 12	4	7th
Taynan Fernandes	33	Rio de Janeiro	Dentist	Eliminated on August 12	5	8th
Teresa Yi Jun Cai	29	Foz do Iguaçu	Engineer	Eliminated on August 5	2	9th
Sofia Jungmann	26	São Paulo	Public relations	Eliminated on July 29	3	10th
Felipe Miyasaka	33	Ribeirão Preto	Advertising	Disqualified on July 29	2	11th
Naiara Bogo	28	Indaial	Nautical designer	Eliminated on July 22	2	12th
Vitória Ketyllin	22	Cianorte	Entrepreneur	Eliminated on July 15	1	13th
André Alexandre	31	Santo Antônio da Alegria	Livestock farmer	Eliminated on July 1	1	14th
Lucas Kaum	31	Brasília	Environmental engineer	Eliminated on June 24	1	15th
Ricard Bezerra	32	Campina Grande	Psychologist	Eliminated on June 17	1	16th
Teresa Yi Jun Cai	29	Foz do Iguaçu	Engineer	Eliminated on June 10	0	Returned on July 8
Flávia Letícia	26	Teófilo Otoni	Nursing technician	Eliminated on June 3	0	17th
Salomar Arcanjo	47	Brasília	Businessman	Eliminated on May 27	0	18th

== Elimination table ==
Place	Contestant	Episode																									
Place	Contestant	1		2		3	4		5		6		7		8	9		10		11		12		13	14		15
1	Daniela	WIN	IMM	IN	LOW	WIN	IN	LOW	WIN	IMM	IN	WIN	IMM		PT	WIN	IMM	IN	LOW	IN	LOW	IN	HIGH	WIN	WIN	IMM	WINNER
2	Felipe B.	HIGH	IMM	IN	WIN	PT	LOW	IN	HIGH	IMM	IN	IN	IMM		WIN	LOW	HIGH	HIGH	IMM	WIN	IMM	WIN	IMM	WIN	HIGH	WIN	RUNNER-UP
3	Gloria	IN	WIN	IN	LOW	WIN	LOW	HIGH	LOW	LOW	LOW	HIGH	IMM		HIGH	LOW	LOW	WIN	IMM	IN	HIGH	IN	IN	WIN	IN	ELIM	
4	Rodrigo	IN	IN	IN	IN	HIGH	IN	LOW	WIN	IMM	HIGH	IMM	IMM		WIN	WIN	IMM	LOW	WIN	WIN	IMM	IN	WIN	WIN	LOW	ELIM	
5	Leonela	IN	IN	HIGH	IMM	WIN	IN	WIN	HIGH	IMM	HIGH	IMM	IMM		LOW	WIN	IMM	IN	IN	IN	IN	HIGH	IMM	ELIM			
6	Guilherme	HIGH	IMM	HIGH	IMM	LOW	IN	IMM	LOW	WIN	IN	IMM	IMM		WIN	WIN	IMM	IN	IN	WIN	IMM	IN	LOW	ELIM			
7	Fernanda	HIGH	IMM	WIN	IMM	PT	HIGH	IMM	HIGH	IMM	IN	IN	IMM		WIN	WIN	IMM	IN	IMM	IN	WIN	IN	ELIM				
8	Taynan	IN	HIGH	WIN	IMM	WIN	WIN	IMM	IN	HIGH	IN	IMM	IMM		WIN	WIN	IMM	HIGH	IMM	IN	IN	IN	ELIM				
9	Teresa	LOW	HIGH	HIGH	IMM	ELIM							WIN	RET	PT	LOW	WIN	LOW	HIGH	IN	ELIM						
10	Sofia	IN	IN	IN	HIGH	WIN	IN	IMM	IN	LOW	WIN	IMM	IMM		WIN	LOW	IN	IN	ELIM								
11	Felipe M.	HIGH	IMM	IN	IN	WIN	HIGH	IMM	LOW	HIGH	HIGH	IMM	IMM		WIN	LOW	LOW	LOW	DSQ								
12	Naiara	HIGH	IMM	HIGH	IMM	WIN	IN	HIGH	WIN	IMM	LOW	LOW	IMM		LOW	LOW	ELIM										
13	Vitória	HIGH	IMM	HIGH	IMM	WIN	HIGH	IMM	HIGH	IMM	LOW	LOW	IMM		ELIM												
14	André	IN	IN	HIGH	IMM	LOW	IN	IMM	WIN	IMM	IN	ELIM															
15	Lucas	HIGH	IMM	IN	IN	WIN	IN	IMM	IN	ELIM																	
16	Ricard	LOW	LOW	WIN	IMM	PT	LOW	ELIM																			
17	Flávia	IN	LOW	IN	ELIM																						
18	Salomar	IN	ELIM																								

Key

- The cook won MasterChef 12.
- The cook was the runner-up.
- The cook won the individual challenge (Mystery Box or Elimination Test).
- The cook was one of the top entries in the individual challenge but did not win.
- The cook did not have to compete in that round and was safe from elimination.
- The cook was not selected as a top or bottom entry in an individual challenge.
- The cook was one of the bottom entries in the Mystery Box and received a disadvantaged in the Elimination Test.
- The cook was on the winning team in the Team Challenge.
- The cook was on the losing team in the Team Challenge.
- The cook was one of the bottom entries in an individual challenge but was saved first.
- The cook was one of the bottom entries in an individual challenge but was saved last.
- The cook won the Reinstation Challenge and returned to the competition.
- The cook was not eligible to compete in that round.
- The cook had to withdraw from the competition.
- The cook was disqualified from MasterChef 12
- The cook was eliminated from MasterChef 12.

== Guest appearances ==
Episode 2

- Chef Alê Costa

Episode 3

- Catia Fonseca

Episode 4

- Chef Carmem Virginia

Episode 6

- Maiquel Vignatti

Episode 8

- Leonardo Andrade

Episode 9

- Chef Rodrigo Oliveira
- Cesar Yukio

Episode 10

- Evaristo Costa
- Chef Luiz Filipe Souza

Episode 11

- Paola Carosella
- Chef Telma Shimizu

Episode 12

- Fernanda Gentil

Episode 13

- Dayse Paparoto
- Elisa Fernandes
- Chef Diego Lozano
- Aline Chermoula
- Arnaldo Lorençato
- Dani Ganazzi
- Daniel Sales
- Giovanna Simonetti
- Isabelle Moreira
- Juliana Simon
- Luisa Januario
- Luiz Américo Camargo
- Marcelo Katsuki
- Mariella Lazaretti
- Marília Miragaia
- Patricia Oyama
- Patrícia Ferraz
- Rosa Moraes

Episode 14

- Mariana Perdomo
- Felipe Helvio
- Nadia Pizzo
- Junior Peto

Episode 15

- Chef Carla Rosas
- Chef Paulo Soares
- Chef Otto Vitelleschi
- Stenio Girardelli
- Raul Lemos
- Chef Diego Lozano

== Ratings and reception ==
=== Brazilian ratings ===
All numbers are in points and provided by Kantar Ibope Media.

Episode	Title	Air date	Timeslot (BRT)	SP viewers (in points)	BR viewers (in points)	Ref.
1	Top 18	May 27, 2025	Tuesday 10:30 p.m.	1.0	1.1	
2	Top 17	June 3, 2025	Tuesday 10:30 p.m.	1.6	1.2	
3	Top 16	June 10, 2025	Tuesday 10:30 p.m.	1.0	Outside top 10	
4	Top 15	June 17, 2025	Tuesday 10:30 p.m.	1.4	1.0	
5	Top 14	June 24, 2025	Tuesday 10:30 p.m.	1.1	Outside top 10	
6	Top 13	July 1, 2025	Tuesday 10:30 p.m.	1.4	1.1	
7	Reinstation challenge	July 8, 2025	Tuesday 10:30 p.m.	1.4	1.2	
8	Top 13 Redux	July 15, 2025	Tuesday 10:30 p.m.	1.5	1.0	
9	Top 12	July 22, 2025	Tuesday 10:30 p.m.	1.5	1.1	
10	Top 11	July 29, 2025	Tuesday 10:30 p.m.	1.5	1.1	
11	Top 9	August 5, 2025	Tuesday 10:30 p.m.	1.8	1.2	
12	Top 8	August 12, 2025	Tuesday 10:30 p.m.	1.8	1.3	
13	Top 6	August 19, 2025	Tuesday 10:30 p.m.	1.7	1.2	
14	Top 4	August 26, 2025	Tuesday 10:30 p.m.	1.8	1.3	
15	Winner announced	September 2, 2025	Tuesday 10:30 p.m.	2.0	1.5	

- In 2025, each point represents 270.631 households in 15 market cities in Brazil (77.488 households in São Paulo).
