= MasterChef (Brazilian TV series) season 10 =

MasterChef
- Season 10
- Presented by: Ana Paula Padrão
- Judges: Érick Jacquin; Helena Rizzo; Rodrigo Oliveira
- No. of contestants: 18
- Winner: Ana Carolina
- Runner-up: Wilton
- No. of episodes: 20

Release
- Original network: Band; Discovery Home & Health; Discovery+ HBO Max
- Original release: May 2 – September 12, 2023

Season chronology
- ← Previous; Season 9 Next → Season 11

The tenth season of the Brazilian competitive reality television series MasterChef premiered on May 2, 2023, at 10:30 / 9:30 p.m. (BRT / AMT) on Band.

Ana Paula Padrão returned as the host, while Érick Jacquin and Helena Rizzo also returned as judges. This season marks the debut of Rodrigo Oliveira as a judge, replacing Henrique Fogaça, who took a hiatus from the show following production of the second season of MasterChef Junior due to undisclosed personal reasons. With Fogaça's departure, Jacquin is the last remaining judge from the show's inaugural season.

The grand prize is R$300.000 courtesy by Pão de Açúcar plus 300.000 Stix points in exchange for prizes, a scholarship on Le Cordon Bleu, a special cookware set by Royal Prestige, a trip to Blumenau plus a complete home bar and a beer sommelier course all courtesy by Eisenbahn and the MasterChef trophy.

Body piercer Ana Carolina Porto won the competition over teacher Wilton Duarte on September 12, 2023.

== Contestants ==
=== Top 18 ===
Contestant	Age	Hometown	Occupation	Result	Winnings	Finish
Ana Carolina Porto	33	São Paulo	Body piercer	Winner on September 12	8	1st
Wilton Duarte	26	Santo Anastácio	Teacher	Runner-up on September 12	7	2nd
Danilo Costa	39	Gonçalves	Truck driver	Eliminated on September 5	4	3rd
Luma Lage	24	Pará de Minas	Visual & tattoo artist	Eliminated on September 5	8	3rd
Jucyléia Machado	57	Itajaí	Administrator	Eliminated on September 5	5	5th
Emanuel Sávio	30	Serra Talhada	Marketing analyst	Eliminated on August 29	7	6th
Dielen Ferreira	24	Santa Vitória do Palmar	Cattle rancher	Eliminated on August 22	5	7th
Gizele Divino	37	Rio Bonito	Singer	Eliminated on August 15	4	8th
Lucas Seiji	28	São Mateus	Production engineer	Eliminated on August 8	2	9th
Stephanie Etzel	31	São Paulo	Creative director	Eliminated on August 1	3	10th
Leonardo Giglio	32	Fortaleza	Rural producer	Eliminated on July 25	3	11th
Ashanti Beal	38	Florianópolis	Actress & model	Eliminated on July 11	4	12th
Endrik Rafael	32	Americana	Pastor & designer	Eliminated on July 4	2	13th
Camila Barreto	31	Duque de Caxias	Model	Eliminated on June 27	1	14th
Mariane Souza	29	Serrana	Bank clerk	Eliminated on June 20	2	15th
Diego Lima	25	Rio de Janeiro	Navy military	Eliminated on June 13	0	16th
Eduardo Riba	31	Joinville	Electrician	Eliminated on June 6	0	17th
Danilo Costa	39	Gonçalves	Truck driver	Eliminated on May 30	1	Returned on July 18
Neylano Vieira	19	Manaus	Student	Eliminated on May 23	0	18th

== Elimination table ==
Place	Contestant	Episode																											
Place	Contestant	4		5		6	7		8	9		10	11		12	13		14	15		16		17		18		19		20
1	Ana Carolina	IN	IMM	IN	IMM	WIN	IN	WIN	WIN	LOW	IN	HIGH	LOW	WIN	IMM	WIN	IMM	WIN	HIGH	IMM	IN	WIN	LOW	LOW	IN	LOW	HIGH	WIN	WINNER
2	Wilton	IN	LOW	LOW	WIN	WIN	HIGH	IMM	HIGH	WIN	IMM	WIN	IN	LOW	IMM	WIN	IMM	HIGH	IN	LOW	IN	IN	LOW	LOW	IN	WIN	WIN	IMM	RUNNER-UP
3	Danilo	LOW	WIN	IN	ELIM										RET	LOW	LOW	WIN	LOW	LOW	IN	HIGH	LOW	WIN	IN	HIGH	IN	ELIM	
3	Luma	HIGH	IMM	LOW	HIGH	NPT	HIGH	IMM	WIN	WIN	IMM	WIN	IN	HIGH	IMM	LOW	HIGH	WIN	WIN	IMM	WIN	IMM	WIN	IMM	WIN	IMM	IN	ELIM	
5	Jucyléia	IN	IMM	HIGH	IMM	WIN	HIGH	IMM	WIN	WIN	IMM	WIN	HIGH	IMM	IMM	LOW	HIGH	LOW	LOW	IN	IN	IN	WIN	IMM	IN	HIGH	ELIM		
6	Emanuel	HIGH	IMM	HIGH	IMM	WIN	LOW	LOW	WIN	WIN	IMM	LOW	IN	IN	IMM	LOW	WIN	WIN	IN	WIN	IN	LOW	WIN	IMM	IN	ELIM			
7	Dielen	IN	LOW	IN	IMM	WIN	IN	HIGH	WIN	LOW	WIN	PT	HIGH	IMM	IMM	WIN	IMM	WIN	LOW	IN	IN	LOW	LOW	ELIM					
8	Gizele	HIGH	IMM	IN	LOW	HIGH	IN	HIGH	WIN	LOW	IN	WIN	LOW	IN	IMM	WIN	IMM	WIN	HIGH	IMM	IN	ELIM							
9	Seiji	IN	IMM	LOW	IN	NPT	IN	IN	WIN	LOW	LOW	LOW	LOW	HIGH	IMM	WIN	IMM	PT	IN	ELIM									
10	Stephanie	LOW	HIGH	HIGH	IMM	WIN	IN	IMM	HIGH	LOW	HIGH	WIN	HIGH	IMM	IMM	WIN	IMM	ELIM											
11	Leonardo	IN	IMM	LOW	HIGH	WIN	HIGH	IMM	LOW	LOW	HIGH	WIN	WIN	IMM	IMM	LOW	ELIM												
12	Ashanti	IN	IN	WIN	IMM	WIN	LOW	IN	PT	WIN	IMM	WIN	LOW	ELIM															
13	Endrik	WIN	IMM	IN	LOW	PT	IN	IMM	LOW	WIN	IMM	ELIM																	
14	Camila	LOW	IN	IN	IMM	LOW	LOW	LOW	WIN	LOW	ELIM																		
15	Mariane	IN	IMM	IN	HIGH	WIN	WIN	IMM	ELIM																				
16	Diego	HIGH	IMM	HIGH	IMM	NPT	IN	ELIM																					
17	Eduardo	IN	IMM	IN	IN	ELIM																							
18	Neylano	LOW	ELIM																										

Key

- The cook won MasterChef 10.
- The cook was the runner-up.
- The cook won the individual challenge (Mystery Box or Elimination Test).
- The cook was one of the top entries in the individual challenge but did not win.
- The cook did not have to compete in that round and was safe from elimination.
- The cook was not selected as a top or bottom entry in an individual challenge.
- The cook was one of the bottom entries in the Mystery Box and received a disadvantaged in the Elimination Test.
- The cook was on the winning team in the Team Challenge.
- The cook was on the losing team in the Team Challenge.
- The cook was one of the bottom entries in an individual challenge but was saved first.
- The cook was one of the bottom entries in an individual challenge but was saved last.
- The cook won the Reinstation Challenge and returned to the competition.
- The cook was not eligible to compete in that round.
- The cook had to withdraw from the competition.
- The cook was eliminated from MasterChef 10.

== Guest appearances ==
Episode 7

- Chef Paulo Machado

Episode 8

- Família Lima
- 100 former MasterChef Brasil contestants, including winners Elisa Fernandes (1) and Isabella Scherer (8)

Episode 9

- Chef Dida Nascimento

Episode 10

- Chef Ale Sotero
- Chef Brenda Freitas
- Chef Paulo Rocha

Episode 14

- Chef Thiago Castanho
- Chef Paulo Soares

Episode 15

- Chef Benny Novak
- Chef Dadá
- Chef Felipe Schaedler
- Chef Jefferson Rueda
- Chef Kalymarakaya
- Chef Laurent Suaudeau
- Chef Mara Salles
- Chef Saiko Izawa
- Chef Tsuyoshi Murakami

Episode 17

- Mohamad Hindi Neto
- Estefano Zaquini
- Raquel Novais
- Fernando Bianchi
- Yuko Tappabutt
- Evandro Zanardo
- Paraskevi Kotta
- Chef Alex Atala

Episode 18

- Chef Alê Costa

== Ratings and reception ==
=== Brazilian ratings ===
All numbers are in points and provided by Kantar Ibope Media.

Episode	Title	Air date	Timeslot (BRT)	SP viewers (in points)	BR viewers (in points)	Ref.
1	Auditions	May 2, 2023	Tuesday 10:30 p.m.	1.7	1.4	
2	Top 34 – Duels (1)	May 9, 2023	Tuesday 10:30 p.m.	1.8	1.3	
3	Top 34 – Duels (2)	May 16, 2023	Tuesday 10:30 p.m.	2.0	1.5	
4	Top 18	May 23, 2023	Tuesday 10:30 p.m.	2.2	1.8	
5	Top 17	May 30, 2023	Tuesday 10:30 p.m.	2.6	1.8	
6	Top 16	June 6, 2023	Tuesday 10:30 p.m.	1.9	1.6	
7	Top 15	June 13, 2023	Tuesday 10:30 p.m.	2.4	1.7	
8	Top 14	June 20, 2023	Tuesday 10:30 p.m.	2.1	1.5	
9	Top 13	June 27, 2023	Tuesday 10:30 p.m.	2.2	1.5	
10	Top 12	July 4, 2023	Tuesday 10:30 p.m.	2.4	1.8	
11	Top 11	July 11, 2023	Tuesday 10:30 p.m.	2.2	1.7	
12	Reinstation challenge	July 18, 2023	Tuesday 10:30 p.m.	1.8	1.4	
13	Top 11 Redux	July 25, 2023	Tuesday 10:30 p.m.	2.2	1.5	
14	Top 10	August 1, 2023	Tuesday 10:30 p.m.	2.0	1.5	
15	Top 9	August 8, 2023	Tuesday 10:30 p.m.	2.1	1.5	
16	Top 8	August 15, 2023	Tuesday 10:30 p.m.	2.4	1.7	
17	Top 7	August 22, 2023	Tuesday 10:30 p.m.	1.9	1.8	
18	Top 6	August 29, 2023	Tuesday 10:30 p.m.	1.8	1.6	
19	Top 5	September 5, 2023	Tuesday 10:30 p.m.	2.7	1.9	
20	Winner announced	September 12, 2023	Tuesday 10:30 p.m.	2.4	1.6	

- In 2023, each point represents 268.083 households in 15 market cities in Brazil (76.953 households in São Paulo).
