= MasterChef (Brazilian TV series) season 9 =

MasterChef
- Season 9
- Presented by: Ana Paula Padrão
- Judges: Érick Jacquin; Helena Rizzo; Henrique Fogaça
- No. of contestants: 16
- Winner: Lays
- Runner-up: Fernanda
- No. of episodes: 17

Release
- Original network: Band
- Original release: May 17 – September 6, 2022

Season chronology
- ← Previous; Season 8 Next → Season 10

The ninth season of the Brazilian competitive reality television series MasterChef premiered on May 17, 2022 at 10:45 p.m. on Band.

Ana Paula Padrão returned as the host, while Érick Jacquin, Helena Rizzo and Henrique Fogaça returned as judges.

The grand prize is R$300.000, a car by Mitsubishi, a scholarship on Le Cordon Bleu, 40 kitchen products from Britânia, a complete home bar and a mixology course from Johnnie Walker and the MasterChef trophy.

Designer Lays Fernandes won the competition over civil engineering Fernanda Oliveira on September 6, 2022.

== Contestants ==
=== Top 16 ===
Contestant	Age	Hometown	Occupation	Result	Winnings	Finish
Lays Fernandes	29	São Paulo	Designer	Winner on September 6	10	1st
Fernanda Oliveira	29	Uberlândia	Civil engineering	Runner-up on September 6	5	2nd
Rafael Barbosa	23	Rio de Janeiro	Gamer	Eliminated on August 30	5	3rd
Renato Mendes	33	Capitão Poço	Sanitation agent	Eliminated on August 23	9	4th
Melina Andrade	29	Salvador	Student of letters	Eliminated on August 16	7	5th
Jason Souza	40	Florianópolis	Businessman	Eliminated on August 9	5	6th
Fernando Presto	36	São Paulo	Artisan & seller of erotic products	Eliminated on August 2	3	7th
Edleide Araújo	42	São Luís	Housewife	Eliminated on July 26	6	8th
Paraskevi Kotta	51	Thessaloniki, Greece	Event organizer	Eliminated on July 19	3	9th
Bruno Nogueira	34	Barroso	Dentist	Eliminated on July 5	4	10th
Daniel Ferreira	41	Paulínia	Salesman	Eliminated on June 28	3	11th
Mário Santelli	33	Niterói	Veterinary	Eliminated on June 21	0	12th
Adílio Gomes	29	Pirenópolis	Missionary	Eliminated on June 14	0	13th
Larissa Soares	24	Belo Horizonte	Veterinary	Eliminated on June 7	1	14th
Mitiko Hori	38	Presidente Prudente	Dentist	Eliminated on May 31	1	15th
Genesca Souza	40	São Borja	Beautician	Eliminated on May 24	0	16th
Fernanda Oliveira	29	Uberlândia	Civil engineering	Eliminated on May 17	0	Returned on July 12

== Elimination table ==
Place	Contestant	Episode																											
Place	Contestant	1		2		3		4		5	6		7		8	9	10	11	12		13		14		15		16		17
1	Lays	IN	IMM	WIN	IMM	WIN	IMM	IN	HIGH	WIN	WIN	IMM	LOW	HIGH	WIN	IMM	WIN	PT	IN	LOW	WIN	IMM	IN	IN	IN	WIN	WIN	IMM	WINNER
2	Fernanda	LOW	ELIM													RET	WIN	WIN	IN	IN	WIN	IMM	IN	LOW	IN	LOW	IN	WIN	RUNNER-UP
3	Rafael	IN	HIGH	HIGH	IMM	WIN	IMM	LOW	IN	PT	IN	IMM	LOW	WIN	PT	IMM	PT	WIN	LOW	LOW	LOW	LOW	LOW	WIN	WIN	IMM	IN	ELIM	
4	Renato	WIN	IMM	HIGH	IMM	WIN	IMM	LOW	LOW	WIN	HIGH	IMM	LOW	LOW	WIN	IMM	WIN	WIN	IN	WIN	WIN	IMM	WIN	IMM	IN	ELIM			
5	Melina	HIGH	IMM	LOW	WIN	LOW	WIN	IN	WIN	WIN	IN	IMM	WIN	IMM	PT	IMM	LOW	WIN	LOW	IN	LOW	WIN	LOW	ELIM					
6	Jason	IN	WIN	HIGH	IMM	LOW	IN	IN	IN	WIN	LOW	HIGH	WIN	IMM	LOW	IMM	WIN	LOW	WIN	IMM	LOW	ELIM							
7	Fernando	IN	IN	HIGH	IMM	LOW	IN	HIGH	IMM	LOW	IN	LOW	WIN	IMM	WIN	IMM	PT	WIN	IN	ELIM									
8	Edleide	IN	IMM	IN	WIN	WIN	IMM	WIN	IMM	HIGH	LOW	LOW	WIN	IMM	WIN	IMM	WIN	ELIM											
9	Paraskevi	IN	LOW	HIGH	IMM	LOW	LOW	HIGH	IMM	WIN	HIGH	IMM	WIN	IMM	WIN	IMM	ELIM												
10	Bruno	IN	WIN	WIN	IMM	LOW	IN	LOW	LOW	WIN	IN	HIGH	WIN	IMM	ELIM														
11	Daniel	HIGH	IMM	IN	HIGH	WIN	IMM	HIGH	IMM	WIN	LOW	WIN	LOW	ELIM															
12	Mário	IN	IMM	HIGH	IMM	LOW	HIGH	IN	IMM	PT	IN	ELIM																	
13	Adílio	HIGH	IMM	LOW	LOW	LOW	LOW	IN	IMM	ELIM																			
14	Larissa	IN	IMM	IN	LOW	WIN	IMM	IN	ELIM																				
15	Mitiko	IN	IMM	WIN	IMM	LOW	ELIM																						
16	Genesca	LOW	LOW	LOW	ELIM																								

=== Key ===
- Winner
- Runner-up
- Individual challenge winner
- Individual challenge top entry
- Individual challenge bottom entry
- Team challenge winner
- Team challenge loser (Elimination Test)
- Immunity
- Saved first
- Saved last
- Eliminated
- Returned
- Did not compete

== Guest appearances ==
Episode 5

- Lauana Prado
- Tayrone

Episode 6

- Chef Timóteo Domingos

Episode 7

- Chef Kelly Grimaldi
- Chef Efrem Cutler

Episode 8

- Valesca Popozuda

Episode 12

- Chef Pía Leon

Episode 14

- Ronaro Soares
- Chef Luana Sabino
- Chef Eduardo Ortiz

Episode 15

- Andressa Alves
- Cristiane, Edmilson
- Chef Pablo Peralta
- Chef Alê Costa

Episode 16

- Dayse Paparoto
- Pablo Oazen
- Rafael Gomes

== Ratings and reception ==
=== Brazilian ratings ===
All numbers are in points and provided by Kantar Ibope Media.

Episode	Title	Air date	Timeslot (BRT)	SP viewers (in points)	BR viewers (in points)	Ref.
1	Top 16	May 17, 2022	Tuesday 10:45 p.m.	2.6	Outside top 10	
2	Top 15	May 24, 2022	Tuesday 10:45 p.m.	2.7	1.8	
3	Top 14	May 31, 2022	Tuesday 10:45 p.m.	3.0	2.2	
4	Top 13	June 7, 2022	Tuesday 10:45 p.m.	3.3	2.0	
5	Top 12	June 14, 2022	Tuesday 10:45 p.m.	3.2	2.0	
6	Top 11	June 21, 2022	Tuesday 10:45 p.m.	3.0	2.1	
7	Top 10	June 28, 2022	Tuesday 10:45 p.m.	2.6	1.9	
8	Top 9	July 5, 2022	Tuesday 10:45 p.m.	1.8	1.8	
9	Reinstation challenge	July 12, 2022	Tuesday 10:45 p.m.	3.3	2.0	
10	Top 9 Redux	July 19, 2022	Tuesday 10:45 p.m.	3.0	2.2	
11	Top 8	July 26, 2022	Tuesday 10:45 p.m.	2.5	1.8	
12	Top 7	August 2, 2022	Tuesday 10:45 p.m.	1.9	1.5	
13	Top 6	August 9, 2022	Tuesday 10:45 p.m.	2.3	1.7	
14	Top 5	August 16, 2022	Tuesday 10:45 p.m.	3.0	2.0	
15	Top 4	August 23, 2022	Tuesday 10:45 p.m.	3.0	1.9	
16	Top 3	August 30, 2022	Tuesday 10:45 p.m.	2.3	1.7	
17	Winner announced	September 6, 2022	Tuesday 10:45 p.m.	2.9	1.9	

- In 2022, each point represents 258.821 households in 15 market cities in Brazil (74.666 households in São Paulo).
