= Gary Maclean =

Scottish chef

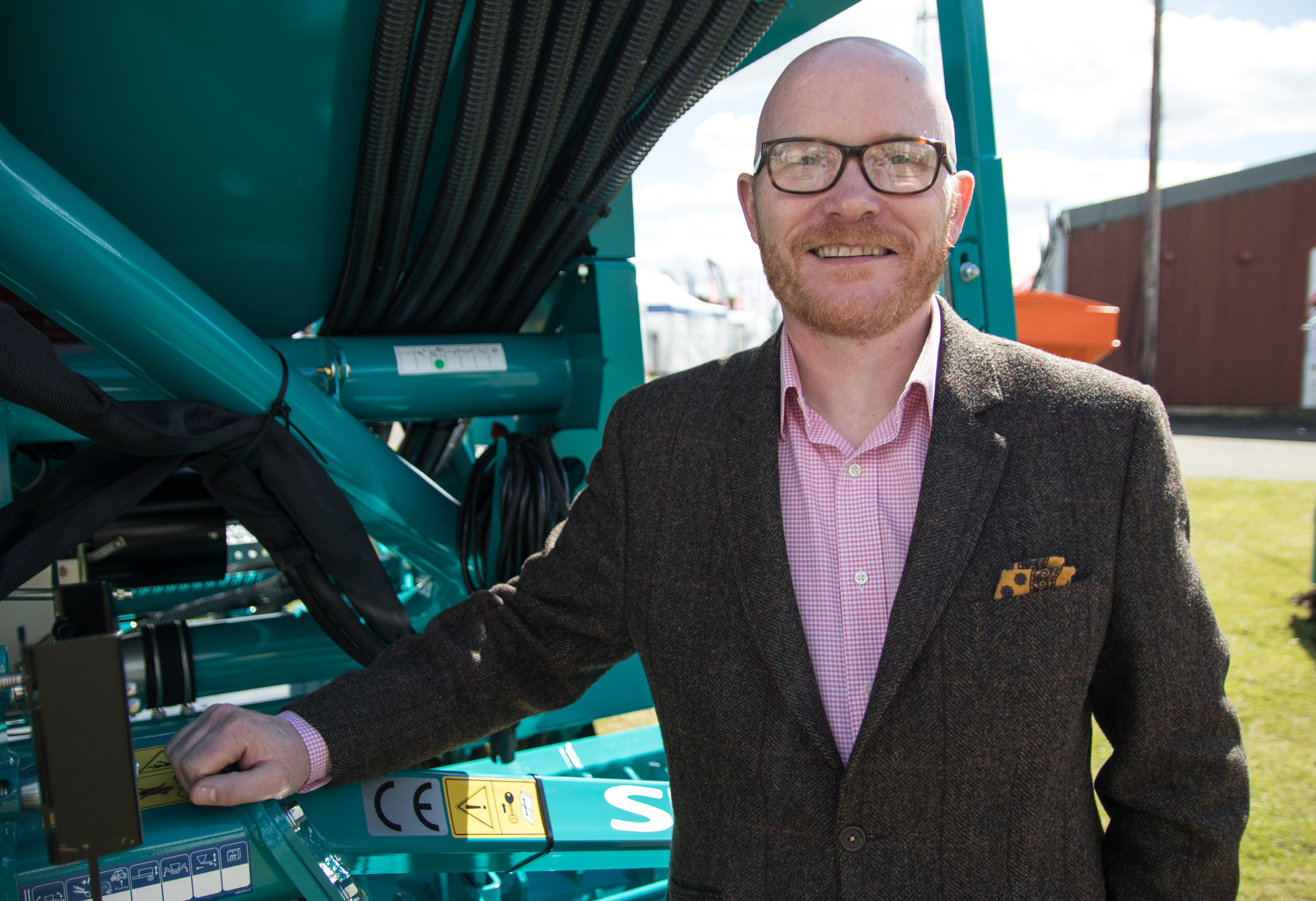
- Born: 25 October 1971 (age 54); Glasgow, Scotland
- Occupations: Chef; author

Gary Maclean is a Scottish chef, author and the first National Chef of Scotland.

== Early life ==
Gary Maclean grew up in Knightswood, Glasgow and was educated at Knightswood Secondary School, where he first developed an interest in cooking through his school's home economics course. Maclean continued his culinary education at the Glasgow College of Food Technology, which has since merged with several other institutions and is now known as the City of Glasgow College.

== Career ==
Maclean began his career at the age of 15, finding his first employment in hotel kitchens in the 1980s. He was appointed the head chef of 55BC, a Glasgow restaurant, at the age of 22. This was his first head chef position. He later became executive chef of Glasgow Museums, this post gave him responsibility over the restaurants at the Burrell Collection and the Gallery of Modern Art, Glasgow. Maclean began full-time teaching at the City of Glasgow College in 2010, he had previously spent 13 years working at the college in a part-time capacity.

Maclean successfully auditioned to appear on 2016's edition of MasterChef: The Professionals, this was his third attempt at applying for the show. After competing against 47 other professional chefs over 7 weeks of competition, Maclean was declared the winner in the final episode of season 9.

The Scottish Government announced, in November 2017, that Maclean was to become Scotland's first National Chef. This role includes promoting Scottish produce on the world stage and encouraging the domestic consumption of healthy, locally produced food.

Maclean released his first book, Kitchen Essentials: The Joy of Home Cooking, in October 2018. It features a foreword by Marcus Wareing, a Michelin-starred chef and one of the judges on MasterChef: The Professionals. His second book, Gary Maclean's Scottish Kitchen, was released in April 2022. It features a foreword by Sam Heughan, the star of Outlander. Both of these books were published by Black & White Publishing. Maclean's The Scottish Kitchen: More Than 100 Timeless Traditional and Contemporary Recipes from Scotland was published in North America by Appetite by Random House, an imprint of Penguin Random House, in 2023. In the same year, Maclean released Gary Maclean's Scottish Celebrations, it features a foreword by Brian Cox.

Maclean wrote the forewords for Sally MacColl's The Tobermory Seafood Bible and Ghillie Basan's Seafood Journey: Tastes and Tales From Scotland.

Maclean co-presented BBC Scotland's Corner Shop Cook-Off alongside Clare Grogan. During each episode, Maclean would compete with another chef to determine who could cook the best three course meal using only produce from a local corner shop. The six episode series originally aired from 19 February to 25 March 2020.

Maclean opened his own seafood restaurant, called Creel Caught, in 2021. It is located in the Bonnie & Wild Scottish Marketplace in the St James Quarter, Edinburgh. Maclean opened a Scottish deli, named Soup & Caboodle, at the same venue in 2023. In 2023, Maclean opened another restaurant, called Scottish Kitchen by Gary Maclean, in the Eastgate Shopping Centre, Inverness.

== Awards ==
Maclean won the Craft Guild of Chefs' chef lecturer award in 2015.

Maclean received the Hospitality Educator of the Year Award at the 2017 CIS Excellence Awards.

Maclean was inducted into the College Development Network's College Hall of Fame in November 2019.

Maclean was awarded the Mark Twain Award by the Saint Andrew's Society of the State of New York, in November 2021, for 'his contributions to the global Scottish community'. The award was bestowed at the Society's 265th annual banquet, held in the University Club of New York.

== Published works ==
- Maclean, Gary (1999). "Yes". In Richardson, Ferrier (ed.). Glasgow on a Plate. Edinburgh: Black & White Publishing. pp. 197–204. ISBN 1902927001.
- Maclean, Gary (2018). Kitchen Essentials: The Joy of Home Cooking. Edinburgh: Black & White Publishing. ISBN 1785301802.
- Maclean, Gary (2021). "Tales from the Pass". In West, Steve (ed.). Chefs and Summer Balls: with a slice of Turkey. Steve West. pp. 52–57. ISBN 1527288668.
- Maclean, Gary (2021). "Recipes & Chefs: Gary Maclean". In Tew, Mattie (ed.). Galley: The Royal Navy and Royal Marines charity cookbook. Sheffield: Meze Publishing Limited. pp. 73–81. ISBN 1910863815.
- Maclean, Gary (2022). Gary Maclean's Scottish Kitchen: Timeless traditional and contemporary recipes. Edinburgh: Black & White Publishing. ISBN 1785303899.
- Maclean, Gary (2022). "A life in the Kitchen: Teaching hospitality in a further education college". In Jones, Samantha (ed.). Great FE Teaching: Sharing good practice. Thousand Oaks: Corwin UK. pp. 1–10. ISBN 1529792851.
- Maclean, Gary (2023). The Scottish Kitchen: More Than 100 Timeless Traditional and Contemporary Recipes from Scotland. Vancouver: Appetite by Random House. ISBN 978-0525612704.
- Maclean, Gary (2023). Gary Maclean's Scottish Celebrations: Treasured traditions and contemporary recipes from Scotland. Edinburgh: Black & White Publishing. ISBN 978-1785304705.
