= MasterChef Profissionais =

Brazilian cooking competition TV series

- Genre: Cooking
- Based on: MasterChef: The Professionals
- Presented by: Ana Paula Padrão
- Judges: Henrique Fogaça; Paola Carosella; Érick Jacquin; Helena Rizzo
- Country of origin: Brazil
- Original language: Portuguese
- No. of seasons: 5
- No. of episodes: 60

Production
- Producers: Eyeworks; Shine International
- Running time: 150 minutes

Original release
- Network: Band
- Release: October 4, 2016 – November 14, 2023

Related
- MasterChef; MasterChef Junior; MasterChef: A Revanche; MasterChef + MasterChef Confeitaria; MasterChef Creators; MasterChef Celebridades

MasterChef Profissionais is a Brazilian cooking competition television series based on the format of the U.K. series MasterChef: The Professionals. The series premiered on Tuesday, October 4, 2016, at 10:30 p.m. (BRT / AMT) on Band. This edition a spin-off from the main MasterChef series, for professional working chefs. The winner receives a cash prize, prizes provided by the show's sponsors, and the *MasterChef Profissionais* trophy.

== Series overview ==
=== Season chronology ===
| Season | Winner | Runner-up | Judge 1 | Judge 2 | Judge 3 |
|---|---|---|---|---|---|
| 1 | Dayse Paparoto | Marcelo Verde | Henrique Fogaça | Paola Carosella | Erick Jacquin |
| 2 | Pablo Oazen | Francisco Pinheiro | Henrique Fogaça | Paola Carosella | Erick Jacquin |
| 3 | Rafael Gomes | Willian Peters | Henrique Fogaça | Paola Carosella | Erick Jacquin |
| 4 | Diego Sacilotto | Thalyta Koller | Henrique Fogaça | Helena Rizzo | Erick Jacquin |
| 5 | Bárbara Frazão | Franklin Bin | Henrique Fogaça | Helena Rizzo | Erick Jacquin |
| 6 | TBA | TBA | Henrique Fogaça | Helena Rizzo | Erick Jacquin |

== Ratings and reception ==
| Season | Timeslot (BRT) | Premiered | | Ended | | TV season | SP viewers (in points) | Source |
| Season | Timeslot (BRT) | Date | Viewers (in points) | Date | Viewers (in points) | TV season | SP viewers (in points) | Source |
|---|---|---|---|---|---|---|---|---|
| 1 | Tuesday 10:30 p.m. | October 4, 2016 | 6.6 | December 13, 2016 | 7.4 | 2016–17 | 6.84 | |
| 2 | Tuesday 10:30 p.m. | September 5, 2017 | 5.8 | December 5, 2017 | 5.3 | 2017–18 | 4.86 | |
| 3 | Tuesday 10:30 p.m. | August 21, 2018 | 5.0 | December 11, 2018 | 5.0 | 2018–19 | 3.98 | |
| 4 | Tuesday 10:45 p.m. | September 13, 2022 | 1.7 | November 8, 2022 | 2.1 | 2022–23 | 2.23 | |
| 5 | Tuesday 10:45 p.m. | September 19, 2023 | 2.2 | November 14, 2023 | 2.0 | 2023–24 | 1.76 | |
| 6 | Tuesday 10:45 p.m. | October 6, 2026 | | January 19, 2027 | | 2026-27 | | |

- Each point represents a specific number of households in São Paulo.
  - 2016: 69.000 households.
  - 2017: 70.500 households.
  - 2018: 71.855 households.
  - 2022: 74.666 households.
  - 2023: 76.953 households.
