= Enaldinho =

Brazilian YouTuber

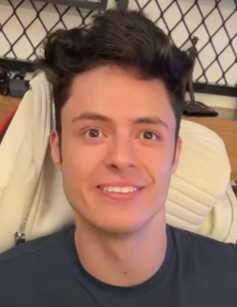
- Enaldinho in 2022
- Born: Enaldo Lopes de Oliveira Filho; 1997 or 1998 (age 27–28); Belo Horizonte, Minas Gerais, Brazil
- Occupation: YouTuber

YouTube information
- Channel: Enaldinho
- Years active: 2012–present
- Genres: Entertainment; gaming; vlog
- Subscribers: 43.5 million
- Views: 21.4 billion
- Last updated: 31 August 2025

Enaldo Lopes de Oliveira Filho (born 1997 or 1998), better known as Enaldinho, is a Brazilian YouTuber. As of July 2024, he is the 5th most-subscribed YouTuber in Brazil after Felipe Neto, Luccas Neto, Whindersson Nunes and Maria Clara & JP and has the 8th biggest channel in the country overall. His content is mainly marketed towards children and he won a Kids' Choice Award in the "Brazilian Influencer" category in 2021.

He was born in Belo Horizonte but currently lives in Nova Lima with his family. In 2024, he made a guest appearance in the eleventh season of the Brazilian version of MasterChef and featured in MrBeast's video "50 YouTubers Fight for $1,000,000".

== Awards and nominations ==
Year	Award	Category	Result	Ref.
2019	Streamy Awards	International: Latin America	Nominated	
2020	Nickelodeon Meus Prêmios Nick	Favorite YouTube Channel	Won	
2021	Kids' Choice Awards	Brazilian Influencer	Won	
2021	Nickelodeon Meus Prêmios Nick	Coolest YouTuber	Nominated	
2021	Streamy Awards	International	Nominated	
2022	Kids' Choice Awards	Brazilian Influencer	Nominated	
2022	Streamy Awards	International	Nominated	
2023	Streamy Awards	International	Nominated	
