= MasterChef Profissionais season 5 =

MasterChef Profissionais
- Season 5
- Presented by: Ana Paula Padrão
- Judges: Érick Jacquin; Helena Rizzo; Henrique Fogaça
- No. of contestants: 14
- Winner: Bárbara
- Runner-up: Franklin
- No. of episodes: 9

Release
- Original network: Band; Discovery Home & Health; Discovery+ HBO Max
- Original release: September 19 – November 14, 2023

Season chronology
- ← Previous; Season 4

The fifth season of the Brazilian competitive reality television series MasterChef Profissionais premiered on September 19, 2023, at 10:30 / 9:30 p.m. (BRT / AMT) on Band.

Ana Paula Padrão returned as the host, while Érick Jacquin and Helena Rizzo returned as judges. Henrique Fogaça also returned as judge after being replaced by Rodrigo Oliveira in the tenth season of MasterChef.

The grand prize was R$300.000 courtesy by Pão de Açúcar plus 300.000 Stix points in exchange for prizes, a premium cookware set by Royal Prestige, a complete home bar and a beer sommelier course all courtesy by Eisenbahn, utensils and appliances by ArcelorMittal and the MasterChef Profissionais trophy.

Chef Bárbara Frazão won the competition over chef Franklin Bin on November 14, 2023.

== Contestants ==
=== Top 14 ===
Contestant	Age	Hometown	Result	Winnings	Finish
Bárbara Frazão	31	Brasília	Winner on November 14	5	1st
Franklin Bin	33	Guarujá	Runner-up on November 14	5	2nd
Yuri Escobar	29	Belo Horizonte	Eliminated on November 7	3	3rd
Moisés Batista	32	Natal	Disqualified on November 7	1	4th
Vinícius Moura	38	Rio de Janeiro	Eliminated on October 31	3	5th
Rozana Caolli	36	Uberlândia	Eliminated on October 24	2	6th
Cíntia Sanchez	41	São Paulo	Eliminated on October 17	2	7th
Bruno Tavares	29	Ananindeua	Eliminated on October 10	1	8th
Raquel Amaral	44	Fortaleza	Disqualified on October 10	1	9th
Bruna Moura	42	São Paulo	Eliminated on October 3	0	10th
Tarek Melhem	28	Tartus, Syria	Eliminated on September 26	0	11th
Eduardo Jacinto	44	Florianópolis	Eliminated on September 19	0	12th
Keila Aviano	50	Belo Horizonte	Eliminated on September 19	0	13th
Rebeca Serrano	30	Rio de Janeiro	Eliminated on September 19	0	14th

== Elimination table ==
Place	Contestant	Episode															
Place	Contestant	1			2		3	4		5	6		7		8		9
1	Bárbara	HIGH		IMM	HIGH	IMM	WIN	HIGH	IMM	HIGH	IN	WIN	IN	WIN	IN	WIN	WINNER
2	Franklin	WIN		IMM	IN	HIGH	WIN	HIGH	IMM	WIN	IN	HIGH	WIN	IMM	WIN	IMM	RUNNER-UP
3	Yuri	LOW		LOW	WIN	IMM	LOW	WIN	IMM	WIN	WIN	IMM	IN	LOW	IN	ELIM	
4	Moisés	HIGH		IMM	LOW	WIN	PT	HIGH	IMM	LOW	HIGH	IMM	HIGH	HIGH	IN	DSQ	
5	Vinícius		WIN	IMM	HIGH	IMM	HIGH	HIGH	IMM	WIN	IN	LOW	IN	ELIM			
6	Rozana		LOW	LOW	HIGH	IMM	WIN	IN	HIGH	WIN	IN	ELIM					
7	Cíntia	LOW		LOW	IN	IN	WIN	IN	WIN	ELIM							
8	Bruno		HIGH	IMM	LOW	IN	WIN	IN	ELIM								
9	Raquel	HIGH		IMM	HIGH	IMM	WIN	IN	DSQ								
10	Bruna		HIGH	IMM	LOW	LOW	ELIM										
11	Tarek		HIGH	IMM	IN	ELIM											
12	Eduardo		LOW	ELIM													
13	Keila		ELIM														
14	Rebeca	ELIM															

Key

- The cook won MasterChef Profissionais.
- The cook was the runner-up.
- The cook won the individual challenge (Mystery Box or Elimination Test).
- The cook was one of the top entries in the individual challenge but did not win.
- The cook did not have to compete in that round and was safe from elimination.
- The cook was not selected as a top or bottom entry in an individual challenge.
- The cook was one of the bottom entries in the Mystery Box and received a disadvantaged in the Elimination Test.
- The cook was on the winning team in the Team Challenge.
- The cook was on the losing team in the Team Challenge.
- The cook was one of the bottom entries in an individual challenge but was saved first.
- The cook was one of the bottom entries in an individual challenge but was saved last.
- The cook won the Reinstation Challenge and returned to the competition.
- The cook was not eligible to compete in that round.
- The cook was disqualified from MasterChef Profissionais.
- The cook was eliminated from MasterChef Profissionais.

== Guest appearances ==
Episode 5

- Tatiana Nolasco
- Helton Oliveira
- Bruno Nogueira
- Larissa Soares
- Dielen Ferreira
- Luma Lage

Episode 7

- Chef Alê Costa

== Ratings and reception ==
=== Brazilian ratings ===
All numbers are in points and provided by Kantar Ibope Media.

Episode	Title	Air date	Timeslot (BRT)	SP viewers (in points)	BR viewers (in points)	Ref.
1	Top 14	September 19, 2023	Tuesday 10:30 p.m.	2.2	1.5	
2	Top 11	September 26, 2023	Tuesday 10:30 p.m.	1.6	1.4	
3	Top 10	October 3, 2023	Tuesday 10:30 p.m.	1.4	Outside top 10	
4	Top 9	October 10, 2023	Tuesday 10:30 p.m.	1.8	1.3	
5	Top 7	October 17, 2023	Tuesday 10:30 p.m.	1.7	1.2	
6	Top 6	October 24, 2023	Tuesday 10:30 p.m.	1.8	1.3	
7	Top 5	October 31, 2023	Tuesday 10:30 p.m.	1.6	1.1	
8	Top 4	November 7, 2023	Tuesday 10:30 p.m.	1.8	1.4	
9	Winner announced	November 14, 2023	Tuesday 10:30 p.m.	2.0	1.5	

- In 2023, each point represents 268.083 households in 15 market cities in Brazil (76.953 households in São Paulo).
