= MasterChef Junior (Brazilian TV series) season 2 =

MasterChef Junior
- Season 2
- Presented by: Ana Paula Padrão
- Judges: Érick Jacquin; Helena Rizzo; Henrique Fogaça
- No. of contestants: 8
- Winner: Larissa
- Runner-up: Lucas
- No. of episodes: 4

Release
- Original network: Band
- Original release: 20 December – 29 December 2022

Season chronology
- ← Previous; Season 1

The second season of the Brazilian competitive reality television series MasterChef Junior premiered on 20 December 2022, at 10:30 p.m. on Band.

Ana Paula Padrão returned as the host, while Érick Jacquin and Henrique Fogaça returned as judges. Paola Carosella left the show after first season and was replaced by Helena Rizzo.

The grand prize was R$15.000 and the MasterChef Junior trophy.

Larissa Krokoscz won the competition over Lucas Martins on 29 December 2022.

== Contestants ==
=== Top 8 ===
Contestant	Age	Result	Winnings
Larissa Krokoscz	9	Winner on 29 December	3
Lucas Martins	12	Runner-up on 29 December	2
João Pedro Farias	12	Eliminated on 27 December	0
Bernardo Uemura	11	Eliminated on 27 December	2
Breno Placeres	10	Eliminated on 22 December	1
Teresa Leonardi	9	Eliminated on 22 December	0
Livia Maria Turella	10	Eliminated on 20 December	0
Letícia Silva	9	Eliminated on 20 December	0

== Elimination table ==
Place	Contestant	Episode					
Place	Contestant	1	2		3		4
1	Larissa	WIN	WIN	IMM	WIN	IMM	WINNER
2	Lucas	WIN	IN	LOW	IN	WIN	RUNNER-UP
3–4	João Pedro	PT	HIGH	IMM	IN	ELIM	
3–4	Bernardo	WIN	IN	WIN	IN	ELIM	
5–6	Breno	WIN	IN	ELIM			
5–6	Teresa	PT	IN	ELIM			
7–8	Livia	ELIM					
7–8	Letícia	ELIM					

=== Key ===
- Winner
- Runner-up
- Individual challenge winner
- Individual challenge top entry
- Mystery Box bottom entry
- Team challenge winner
- Team challenge loser (PT)
- Immunity
- Immunity extra
- Saved first
- Saved last
- Eliminated

== Ratings and reception ==
=== Brazilian ratings ===
All numbers are in points and provided by Kantar Ibope Media.

Episode	Title	Air date	Timeslot (BRT)	SP viewers (in points)	Ref.
1	Top 8	20 December 2022	Tuesday 10:30 p.m.	2.1	
2	Top 6	22 December 2022	Thursday 10:30 p.m.	1.6	
3	Top 4	27 December 2022	Tuesday 10:30 p.m.	2.1	
4	Winner announced	29 December 2022	Thursday 10:30 p.m.	1.5	

- In 2022, each point represents 258.821 households in 15 market cities in Brazil (74.666 households in São Paulo).
