= Isabella Scherer =

Brazilian actress

- Born: Isabella Medeiros Scherer; February 17, 1996 (age 30); Florianópolis, Santa Catarina, Brazil
- Occupation: Actress
- Years active: 2012–present
- Spouse: Rodrigo Calazans (m. 2023)
- Children: 2
- Parent(s): Fernando Scherer (father); Vanessa Medeiros (mother)

Isabella Medeiros Scherer (born February 17, 1996, in Florianópolis) is a Brazilian actress, fashion designer, chef and television personality.

== Early life ==
Isabella Scherer is the daughter of Vanessa Medeiros with the former swimmer Fernando "Xuxa" Scherer. The young woman even trained as a child to continue the sports career in which her father was a medalist, but chose to pursue the artistic side.

At 14, she left the swimming pools aside and began studying at the Wolf Maia Theater School. At 15, she opened a YouTube channel and a blog on fashion, beauty and lifestyle, maintaining the projects until she was 19 years old.

Isabella started college in fashion, but dropped out to dedicate herself to an acting career. In 2018, she started her clothing brand called Serê.

== Career ==
She made her television debut in 2012, playing two characters, Katy & Apelônia, in the series Família Imperial, on Canal Futura. In 2014, she was Aline in Cartoon Network's Experimentos Extraordinários series. In 2015, she made her film debut playing Mariana in the movie Califórnia. In 2016, she played the villain Sarita in the third season of the series Que Talento !, from Disney Channel.

In 2017, she made her debut on open TV in the twenty-fifth season of Malhação playing the spoiled Clara. In 2019, she made a guest appearance in Psi. In the same year, she played the protagonist Paloma in the first stage of the soap opera Bom Sucesso.

In 2021, it was the winner of the eighth season of the MasterChef Brazil, taking the prize is R$300.000, a scholarship on Le Cordon Bleu, a year's shop card on Amazon.com worth R$5.000 per month, kitchen products from Britânia and Brastemp, a trip to "an unforgettable gastronomic destination" and the MasterChef trophy.

== Personal life ==
Between 2015 and 2019, she dated actor & singer Fiuk. Despite being photographed together, the relationship was not confirmed by the two, who avoid talking about the subject.

Currently, she is dating model and surfer Rodrigo Calazans. In March 2022, she announced that she was pregnant with twins with her boyfriend. Isabela gave birth to a boy and girl twins Mel and Bento on August 29, 2022, through a cesarean delivery performed at the Pro Matre maternity hospital in São Paulo.

== Filmography ==
=== Television ===
Year	Title	Role	Notes
2012–13	Família Imperial	Katy	
2012–13	Família Imperial	Apelônia	
2014	Experimentos Extraordinários	Aline	
2016	Que Talento!	Sarita	Season 3
2017–18	Malhação	Clara Becker Gutierrez	Season 25
2019	Psi	Helen	Episode: "A Bruxa"
2019	Bom Sucesso	Young Paloma	Episode: "July 30th"
2021	MasterChef Brasil	Contestant	Winner

=== Film ===
Year	Title	Role	Notes
2015	Califórnia	Mariana	
