= MasterChef (Brazilian TV series) season 8 =

MasterChef
- Season 8
- Presented by: Ana Paula Padrão
- Judges: Érick Jacquin; Helena Rizzo; Henrique Fogaça
- No. of contestants: 23
- Winner: Isabella
- Runner-up: Eduardo
- No. of episodes: 24

Release
- Original network: Band
- Original release: July 6 – December 14, 2021

Season chronology
- ← Previous; Season 7 Next → Season 9

The eighth season of the Brazilian competitive reality television series MasterChef premiered on July 6, 2021 at 10:45 p.m. on Band.

Ana Paula Padrão returned as the host, while Érick Jacquin and Henrique Fogaça returned as judges. Paola Carosella left the show after seven seasons and was replaced by Helena Rizzo.

In addition, the show returns to its standard format instead of the "two-test, one winner per episode" format used in the seventh season.

The grand prize is R$300.000, a scholarship on Le Cordon Bleu, a year's shop card on Amazon.com worth R$5.000 per month, kitchen products from Britânia and Brastemp, a trip to "an unforgettable gastronomic destination" and the MasterChef trophy.

Actress Isabella Scherer won the competition over college student Eduardo Prado and lawyer Kelyn Kuhn on December 14, 2021.

== Contestants ==
This season features three contestants who had previously appeared on season 7 – Heitor Cardoso, Juliana Arraes and Renato Nogueira; as well two contestants who had previously appeared on MasterChef Junior 1 – Daphne Sonnenschein and Eduardo Prado.

=== Top 23 ===
Contestant	Age	Hometown	Occupation	Result	Winnings	Finish
Isabella Scherer	25	Florianópolis	Actress	Winner on December 14	7	1st
Eduardo Prado	19	São Paulo	College student	Runner-up on December 14	11	2nd
Kelyn Kuhn	28	Canarana	Lawyer	Third place on December 14	8	3rd
Daphne Sonnenschein	19	São Paulo	Skateboarder	Eliminated on December 7	7	4th
Tiago Souto	36	Brasília	Advertiser	Eliminated on November 30	4	5th
Heitor Cardoso	30	Campinas	Systems analyst	Eliminated on November 23	8	6th
Helena Furtado	43	São João Nepomuceno	Journalist	Eliminated on November 16	7	7th
Luiz Horta	31	Rio de Janeiro	Financial analyst	Eliminated on November 9	8	8th
Ana Bettinelli	30	David Canabarro	Speech Therapist	Eliminated on November 2	4	9th
Raquel Fonseca	35	Salvador	Financial analyst	Eliminated on October 26	5	10th
Márcio Cabral	52	São Paulo	Teacher	Eliminated on October 19	5	11th
José Sergio da Silva	50	Canhotinho	Trade representative	Eliminated on October 12	3	12th
Helena Furtado	43	São João Nepomuceno	Journalist	Eliminated on September 28	4	Returned on October 5
Pedro Scapini	29	Campos Novos	Architect	Eliminated on September 21	4	13th
Amanda Azeredo	26	Rio de Janeiro	Interior designer	Eliminated on September 14	0	14th
Renato Nogueira	35	Pindamonhangaba	Environmental engineer	Eliminated on September 7	2	15th
André Serra	32	São Paulo	Businessman	Eliminated on August 31	1	16th
Juliana Arraes	37	Passos	Entrepreneur	Eliminated on August 24	1	17th
Cristina Edite	51	São Sebastião do Passé	Pedagogical coordinator	Eliminated on August 17	0	18th
Tiago Souto	36	Brasília	Advertiser	Eliminated on August 10	1	Returned on October 5
Antônio Carlos Soares	23	Maceió	Marketing analyst	Eliminated on August 3	1	19th
Juliana Nardelli	46	Taubaté	Stylist	Eliminated on July 27	1	20th
Ana Karina Teles	40	Recife	Doctor	Eliminated on July 21	0	21st
Gabriel Carlin	19	Andradas	Intern	Eliminated on July 13	0	22nd
Bernardo Mattos	40	Rio de Janeiro	Businessman	Eliminated on July 6	0	23rd

== Elimination table ==
Place	Contestant	Episode																																												
Place	Contestant	1			2			3			4	5	6		7			8			9	10		11		12	13		14	15	16		17		18	19		20		21		22		23		24
1	Isabella	WIN	IMM					IN	IMM		PT	WIN	HIGH	IMM	IN	HIGH	HIGH	HIGH	IMM		NPT	IN	HIGH	HIGH	IMM	PT	HIGH	IMM		NPT	WIN	IMM	HIGH	IMM	WIN	WIN	IMM	WIN	IMM	IN	HIGH	IN	HIGH	WIN	IMM	WINNER
2	Eduardo	IN	WIN	IMM				IN	IN	WIN	WIN	WIN	IN	WIN	LOW	BAN	IN	WIN	IMM		PT	IN	IMM	LOW	IN	WIN	LOSE	IN		PT	LOW	WIN	LOW	HIGH	LOW	LOW	IN	IN	LOW	WIN	IMM	WIN	IMM	IN	WIN	RUNNER-UP
3	Kelyn				IN	IN	HIGH	LOW	BAN	SAFE	PT	WIN	LOW	IN	IN	BAN	WIN	HIGH	IMM		NPT	IN	WIN	IN	WIN	WIN	HIGH	IMM		WIN	HIGH	IMM	WIN	IMM	HIGH	LOW	LOW	LOW	WIN	WIN	IMM	IN	LOW	HIGH	LOW	THIRD PLACE
4	Daphne				WIN	IMM		IN	IMM		NPT	WIN	IN	IN	WIN	IMM		HIGH	IMM		PT	IN	IMM	LOW	HIGH	SAFE	IN	LOW		LOW	LOW	LOW	HIGH	IMM	LOW	LOW	WIN	HIGH	HIGH	IN	WIN	IN	WIN	IN	ELIM	
5	Tiago	IN	IMM					IN	HIGH	IMM	SAFE	WIN	IN	ELIM															RET	WIN	LOW	LOW	LOW	WIN	HIGH	IN	LOW	IN	HIGH	IN	LOW	LOW	ELIM			
6	Heitor	IN	IN	LOW				IN	IMM		WIN	2nd	IN	IMM	HIGH	IMM		HIGH	IMM		WIN	LOW	SAFE	WIN	IMM	WIN	WIN	IMM		WIN	IN	IN	HIGH	IMM	WIN	IN	HIGH	IN	LOW	IN	ELIM					
7	Helena				LOW	BAN	WIN	HIGH	IMM		WIN	LOW	IN	IMM	HIGH	IMM		LOW	WIN	IMM	WIN	HIGH	IMM	LOW	SAFE	NPT	IN	ELIM	RET	NPT	HIGH	IMM	HIGH	IMM	WIN	WIN	IMM	HIGH	ELIM							
8	Luiz				HIGH	IMM		HIGH	IMM		WIN	2nd	IN	HIGH	LOW	BAN	SAFE	LOW	BAN	WIN	WIN	LOW	IN	HIGH	IMM	WIN	WIN	IMM		WIN	IN	IN	LOW	HIGH	WIN	IN	ELIM									
9	Ana	HIGH	IMM					HIGH	IMM		WIN	2nd	WIN	IMM	IN	IMM		LOW	IN	HIGH	HIGH	WIN	IMM	IN	IMM	LOW	LOSE	HIGH		WIN	HIGH	IMM	LOW	LOW	ELIM											
10	Raquel	HIGH	IMM					IN	IMM		WIN	WIN	IN	IMM	HIGH	IMM		HIGH	IMM		WIN	LOW	HIGH	HIGH	IMM	PT	IN	WIN		WIN	HIGH	IMM	LOW	ELIM												
11	Márcio				HIGH	IMM		IN	IMM		WIN	WIN	IN	IMM	IN	IMM		HIGH	IMM		WIN	IN	LOW	IN	IMM	WIN	IN	SAFE		WIN	IN	ELIM														
12	José Sergio	LOW	BAN	HIGH				IN	IMM		WIN	2nd	LOW	LOW	IN	IMM		LOW	BAN	LOW	SAFE	IN	IN	IN	IMM	WIN	HIGH	IMM		ELIM																
13	Pedro				IN	WIN	IMM	IN	HIGH	IMM	LOW	2nd	IN	IMM	IN	WIN	IMM	LOW	IN	HIGH	WIN	HIGH	IMM	IN	LOW	ELIM																				
14	Amanda				LOW	BAN	LOW	IN	HIGH	IMM	PT	PT	LOW	SAFE	IN	IMM		LOW	BAN	HIGH	LOW	HIGH	IMM	IN	ELIM																					
15	Renato				IN	IN	HIGH	WIN	IMM		NPT	2nd	IN	IMM	IN	IMM		HIGH	IMM		HIGH	IN	ELIM																							
16	André				IN	IMM		IN	IN	HIGH	WIN	SAFE	HIGH	IMM	IN	IN	HIGH	LOW	IN	SAFE	ELIM																									
17	Juliana A.	LOW	BAN	HIGH				IN	IN	HIGH	WIN	HIGH	IN	IMM	IN	BAN	LOW	LOW	BAN	ELIM																										
18	Cristina				LOW	BAN	SAFE	LOW	BAN	HIGH	NPT	PT	IN	IMM	LOW	BAN	ELIM																													
19	Antônio	LOW	BAN	SAFE				IN	IMM		WIN	ELIM																																		
20	Juliana N.	IN	IN	WIN				LOW	BAN	LOW	ELIM																																			
21	Ana Karina				IN	IMM		IN	IN	ELIM																																				
22	Gabriel				IN	IN	ELIM																																							
23	Bernardo	IN	IN	ELIM																																										

=== Key ===
- Winner
- Runner-up
- Individual challenge winner
- Individual challenge top entry
- Individual challenge bottom entry
- Team challenge winner
- Second Team challenge winner
- Team challenge loser (Elimination Test)
- Immunity
- Immunity (Saved by challenge winner)
- Saved by the winning contestants
- Saved first
- Saved last
- Eliminated
- Banned
- Returned
- Did not compete

== Ratings and reception ==
=== Brazilian ratings ===
All numbers are in points and provided by Kantar Ibope Media.

Episode	Title	Air date	Timeslot (BRT)	SP viewers (in points)	BR viewers (in points)	Ref.
1	Top 23	July 6, 2021	Tuesday 10:45 p.m.	2.5	1.8	
2	Top 22	July 13, 2021	Tuesday 10:45 p.m.	2.6	1.9	
3	Top 21	July 21, 2021	Wednesday 10:45 p.m.	2.6	1.8	
4	Top 20	July 27, 2021	Tuesday 10:45 p.m.	2.5	1.7	
5	Top 19	August 3, 2021	Tuesday 10:45 p.m.	2.1	1.6	
6	Top 18	August 10, 2021	Tuesday 10:45 p.m.	2.1	1.5	
7	Top 17	August 17, 2021	Tuesday 10:45 p.m.	2.4	1.8	
8	Top 16	August 24, 2021	Tuesday 10:45 p.m.	2.8	1.9	
9	Top 15	August 31, 2021	Tuesday 10:45 p.m.	2.6	1.7	
10	Top 14	September 7, 2021	Tuesday 10:45 p.m.	2.9	2.0	
11	Top 13	September 14, 2021	Tuesday 10:45 p.m.	2.5	1.6	
12	Top 12	September 21, 2021	Tuesday 10:45 p.m.	2.0	1.4	
13	Top 11	September 28, 2021	Tuesday 10:45 p.m.	2.5	1.6	
14	Reinstation challenge	October 5, 2021	Tuesday 10:45 p.m.	2.5	1.6	
15	Top 12 Redux	October 12, 2021	Tuesday 10:45 p.m.	2.2	1.4	
16	Top 11 Redux	October 19, 2021	Tuesday 10:45 p.m.	2.1	Outside top 10	
17	Top 10	October 26, 2021	Tuesday 10:45 p.m.	2.0	1.4	
18	Top 9	November 2, 2021	Tuesday 10:45 p.m.	2.0	Outside top 10	
19	Top 8	November 9, 2021	Tuesday 10:45 p.m.	2.1	1.4	
20	Top 7	November 16, 2021	Tuesday 10:45 p.m.	2.3	1.6	
21	Top 6	November 23, 2021	Tuesday 10:45 p.m.	2.0	1.5	
22	Top 5	November 30, 2021	Tuesday 10:45 p.m.	2.0	1.3	
23	Top 4	December 7, 2021	Tuesday 10:45 p.m.	1.7	1.4	
24	Winner announced	December 14, 2021	Tuesday 10:45 p.m.	2.7	1.9	

- In 2021, each point represents 268.278 households in 15 market cities in Brazil (76.577 households in São Paulo).
