= MasterChef Junior (Brazilian TV series) season 1 =

MasterChef Junior
- Season 1
- Presented by: Ana Paula Padrão
- Judges: Érick Jacquin; Paola Carosella; Henrique Fogaça
- No. of contestants: 20
- Winner: Lorenzo
- Runner-up: Lívia
- No. of episodes: 9

Release
- Original network: Band
- Original release: October 20 – December 15, 2015

Season chronology
- Next → Season 2

The first season of the Brazilian competitive reality television series MasterChef Junior premiered on October 20, 2015, at 10:30 p.m. on Band.

The grand prize was R$20.000, a trip for six to Disney World courtesy of Decolar.com, a 3-month cooking course with the three judges, a year's supply on Carrefour of R$1,000 per month, one small appliance kitchen package by Oster and the MasterChef Junior trophy.

Lorenzo Ravioli won the competition over Lívia Lopes on December 15, 2015.

== Contestants ==
=== Top 20 ===
Contestant	Age	Result	Winnings
Lorenzo Ravioli	13	Winner on December 15	3
Lívia Lopes	12	Runner-up on December 15	4
Ivana Coelho	9	Eliminated on December 8	3
Sofia Bresser	12	Eliminated on December 8	4
Eduardo Prado	13	Eliminated on December 1	1
Valentina Schulz	12	Eliminated on December 1	1
Daphne Sonnenschein	13	Eliminated on November 17	2
Matheus Burigo	11	Eliminated on November 17	0
Aisha Carolina	9	Eliminated on November 19	1
Laura Bassi	11	Eliminated on November 19	1
Mateus Girardi	12	Eliminated on November 3	0
Tomás Balaban	13	Eliminated on November 3	0
Johnny Willian	11	Eliminated on October 27	0
Vitoria "Vivi" Rovai	11	Eliminated on October 27	0
Andrey Silva	13	Eliminated on October 20	0
Hytalo Mattos	11	Eliminated on October 20	0
Gleyson Junior	12	Eliminated on October 20	0
Piera Dimartino	11	Eliminated on October 20	0
Augusto Toledo	11	Eliminated on October 20	0
Luiza Miranda	10	Eliminated on October 20	0

== Elimination table ==
Place	Contestant	Episode															
Place	Contestant	1			2		3	4		5		6		7	8		9
1	Lorenzo	IN	IMM		HIGH	IMM	PT	IN	HIGH	IN	LOW	HIGH	IN	WIN	IN	WIN	WINNER
2	Lívia		IN	IMM	HIGH	IMM	PT	IN	WIN	HIGH	IMM	IN	WIN	WIN	WIN	IMM	RUNNER-UP
3–4	Ivana		IN	IMM	IN	HIGH	WIN	IN	HIGH	IN	WIN	HIGH	IN	WIN	IN	ELIM	
3–4	Sofia			IN	WIN	IMM	WIN	WIN	IMM	HIGH	LOW	WIN	IMM	WIN	IN	ELIM	
5–6	Eduardo			IN	IN	HIGH	LOW	HIGH	IMM	WIN	IMM	IN	IN	ELIM			
5–6	Valentina		IN	IMM	IN	IN	PT	IN	LOW	IN	LOW	WIN	IMM	ELIM			
7–8	Daphne	IN	IMM		IN	WIN	WIN	HIGH	IMM	IN	ELIM						
7–8	Matheus B.	IN	IMM		IN	IN	LOW	IN	LOW	HIGH	ELIM						
9–10	Aisha	IN	IMM		HIGH	IMM	WIN	IN	ELIM								
9–10	Laura		IN	IMM	IN	IN	WIN	IN	ELIM								
11–12	Mateus G.			IN	IN	LOW	ELIM										
11–12	Tomás	IN	IMM		IN	LOW	ELIM										
13–14	Johnny		IN	IMM	IN	ELIM											
13–14	Vivi			IN	IN	ELIM											
15–16	Andrey			ELIM													
15–16	Hytalo			ELIM													
17–18	Gleyson		ELIM														
17–18	Piera		ELIM														
19–20	Augusto	ELIM															
19–20	Luiza	ELIM															

Key

Winner	Runner-up	Individual challenge winner
Team challenge winner	Team challenge loser (PT)	Individual challenge top entry
Immunity	Saved last	Eliminated

== Ratings and reception ==
=== Brazilian ratings ===
All numbers are in points and provided by IBOPE.

Week	Episode	Air date	Timeslot (BRT)	Viewers (in points)	Rank timeslot	Source
1	Top 20	20 October 2015	Tuesday 10:30 p.m.	6.1	4	
2	Top 14	27 October 2015	Tuesday 10:30 p.m.	6.5	4	
3	Top 12	3 November 2015	Tuesday 10:30 p.m.	5.3	4	
4	Top 10	10 November 2015	Tuesday 10:30 p.m.	6.7	4	
5	Top 8	17 November 2015	Tuesday 10:30 p.m.	4.4	4	
6	Top 6	24 November 2015	Tuesday 10:30 p.m.	5.6	4	
7	Top 6	1 December 2015	Tuesday 10:30 p.m.	5.6	4	
8	Top 4	8 December 2015	Tuesday 10:30 p.m.	4.7	4	
9	Winner announced	15 December 2015	Tuesday 10:30 p.m.	6.3	4	

- In 2015, each point represents 67.000 households in São Paulo.

Note: Episode 5 aired against the Brazil vs. Peru football match for the 2018 FIFA World Cup qualification.
Note: Episode 8 aired against the season finale of A Fazenda 8.
