= Santa Bárbara, Bahia =

Municipality of Bahia State, Brazil

Santa Bárbara
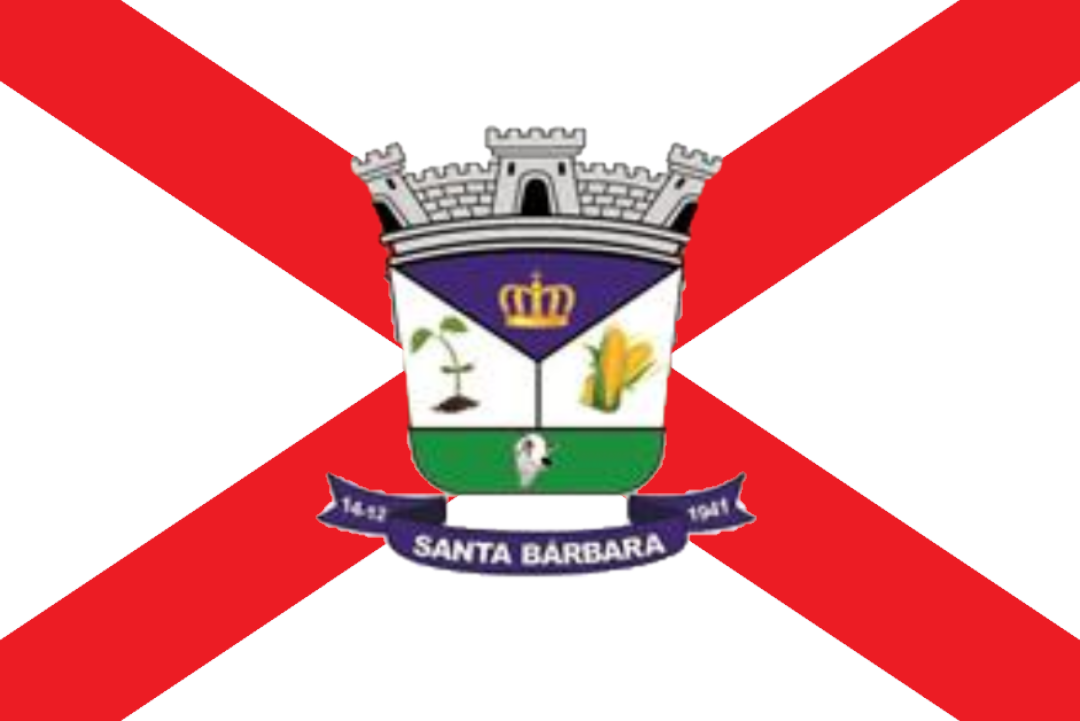
- Flag

- Coordinates: 11°57′28″S 38°58′30″W
- Region: Nordeste
- State: Bahia
- Founded: 14 December 1961
- Elevation: 293 m (961 ft)

Population (2020)
  - Total: 20,883
- Time zone: UTC−3 (BRT)
- Postal code: 2927507

Santa Bárbara is a municipality in the state of Bahia in the North-East region of Brazil.

== See also ==
- List of municipalities in Bahia
