= MasterChef Profissionais season 4 =

MasterChef Profissionais
- Season 4
- Presented by: Ana Paula Padrão
- Judges: Érick Jacquin; Helena Rizzo; Henrique Fogaça
- No. of contestants: 12
- Winner: Diego
- Runner-up: Thalyta
- No. of episodes: 9

Release
- Original network: Band
- Original release: September 13 – November 8, 2022

Season chronology
- ← Previous; Season 3 Next → Season 5

The fourth season of the Brazilian competitive reality television series MasterChef Profissionais premiered on September 13 at 10:30 p.m. on Band.

Ana Paula Padrão returned as the host, while Érick Jacquin and Henrique Fogaça returned as judges. Paola Carosella left the show after three seasons and was replaced by Helena Rizzo.

Chef Diego Sacilotto won the competition over chef Thalyta Koller on November 8, 2022.

== Contestants ==
=== Top 12 ===
Contestant	Age	Hometown	Result	Winnings	Finish
Diego Sacilotto	41	São Paulo	Winner on November 8	6	1st
Thalyta Koller	30	Porto Alegre	Runner-up on November 8	4	2nd
Wilson Cabral†	39	Rio de Janeiro	Eliminated on November 1	4	3rd
Ananda Lutzenberger	27	Santos	Eliminated on October 25	2	4th
Enzo Ceccin	23	Santa Maria	Eliminated on October 18	2	5th
Marília Amorim	37	Recife	Eliminated on October 11	2	6th
Hichel Rodrigues	43	Sorocaba	Eliminated on October 4	0	7th
Ellen Romão	24	Olinda	Eliminated on September 27	1	8th
Marcelus Benevides	37	Natal	Eliminated on September 20	0	9th
Thyago Rocha	39	Maringá	Eliminated on September 13	0	10th
Luciane Recco	36	São Paulo	Eliminated on September 13	0	11th
Claudia Ramos	48	Aracaju	Eliminated on September 13	0	12th

== Elimination table ==
Place	Contestant	Episode																		
Place	Contestant	1			2		3		4		5		6		7^{^{1}}			8		9
1	Diego		WIN	IMM	HIGH	HIGH	WIN	IMM	IN	WIN	LOST	LOW	IN	WIN	LOW	WIN	LOW	IN	WIN	WINNER
2	Thalyta		LOW	IN	LOW	HIGH	IN	WIN	WIN	IMM	LOST	HIGH	IN	HIGH	LOW	IN	WIN	WIN	IMM	RUNNER-UP
3	Wilson	WIN	IMM		WIN	IMM	LOW	LOW	IN	HIGH	WIN	IMM	LOW	LOW	WIN	IMM		IN	ELIM	
4	Ananda		HIGH	IMM	HIGH	LOW	IN	HIGH	HIGH	IMM	LOST	WIN	WIN	IMM	LOW	IN	ELIM			
5	Enzo	HIGH	IMM		HIGH	WIN	IN	LOW	LOW	LOW	WIN	IMM	LOW	ELIM						
6	Marília	LOW		IN	WIN	IMM	HIGH	IMM	LOW	HIGH	WIN	ELIM								
7	Hichel		LOW	IN	LOW	LOW	HIGH	IMM	IN	ELIM										
8	Ellen		HIGH	IMM	WIN	IMM	IN	ELIM												
9	Marcelus	HIGH	IMM		LOW	ELIM														
10	Thyago	LOW		ELIM																
11	Luciane		ELIM																	
12	Claudia	ELIM																		

^Note 1: Episode 7 included an intermediary challenge. The winner of the challenge had a ten minute advantage in the elimination challenge.

Key

Winner	Runner-up	Individual challenge winner
Team challenge winner	Team challenge loser (PT)	Individual challenge top entry
Immunity	Saved first	Saved last
Immunity extra	Individual challenge bottom entry	Eliminated
Withdrew	Returned	Did not compete

== Ratings and reception ==
=== Brazilian ratings ===
All numbers are in points and provided by Kantar Ibope Media.

Episode	Title	Air date	Timeslot (BRT)	SP viewers (in points)	BR viewers (in points)	Ref.
1	Top 12	September 13, 2022	Tuesday 10:45 p.m.	1.7	Outside top 10	
2	Top 9	September 20, 2022	Tuesday 10:45 p.m.	2.1	Outside top 10	
3	Top 8	September 27, 2022	Tuesday 10:45 p.m.	2.3	Outside top 10	
4	Top 7	October 4, 2022	Tuesday 10:45 p.m.	2.2	1.5	
5	Top 6	October 11, 2022	Tuesday 10:45 p.m.	2.4	1.7	
6	Top 5	October 18, 2022	Tuesday 10:45 p.m.	2.6	1.7	
7	Top 4	October 25, 2022	Tuesday 10:45 p.m.	2.3	1.6	
8	Top 3	November 1, 2022	Tuesday 10:45 p.m.	2.4	1.7	
9	Winner announced	November 8, 2022	Tuesday 10:45 p.m.	2.1	1.6	

- In 2022, each point represents 258.821 households in 15 market cities in Brazil (74.666 households in São Paulo).
