= MasterChef Profissionais season 2 =

MasterChef Profissionais
- Season 2
- Presented by: Ana Paula Padrão
- Judges: Érick Jacquin; Paola Carosella; Henrique Fogaça
- No. of contestants: 16
- Winner: Pablo
- Runner-up: Francisco
- No. of episodes: 14

Release
- Original network: Band
- Original release: September 5 – December 5, 2017

Season chronology
- ← Previous; Season 1 Next → Season 3

The second season of the Brazilian competitive reality television series MasterChef Profissionais premiered on September 5, 2017, at 10:30 p.m. on Band.

Chef Pablo Oazen won the competition over chef Francisco Pinheiro on December 5, 2017.

== Contestants ==
=== Top 16 ===
Contestant	Age	Hometown	Result	Winnings	Finish
Pablo Oazen	37	Juiz de Fora	Winner on December 5	7	1st
Francisco Pinheiro	43	Solonópole	Runner-up on December 5	5	2nd
Irina Cordeiro	29	Natal	Eliminated on November 28	6	3rd
Raissa Ribeiro	22	São Paulo	Eliminated on November 21	4	4th
Lubyanka Baltar	37	João Pessoa	Eliminated on November 14	2	5th
Monique Gabiatti	32	Aracaju	Eliminated on November 7	2	6th
Ravi Leite	26	Curitiba	Eliminated on October 31	4	7th
Clécio Campos	39	Cordisburgo	Eliminated on October 24	1	8th
Guilherme Cardadeiro	27	São Paulo	Eliminated on October 17	1	9th
Angelica Vitali	37	São Caetano do Sul	Eliminated on October 10	2	10th
Mirna Gomes	36	Recife	Eliminated on October 3	2	11th
Guilherme Cardadeiro	27	São Paulo	Eliminated on September 26	0	Returned on October 17
William Williges	25	Caxias do Sul	Eliminated on September 19	0	12th
Berta Schneider	34	Itatiaia	Eliminated on September 12	0	13th
Barbara Cardin	22	Londrina	Eliminated on September 5	0	14th
Edney Moreira	40	Contagem	Eliminated on September 5	0	15th
Pedro Pecego	35	Rio de Janeiro	Eliminated on September 5	0	16th

== Elimination table ==
Place	Contestant	Episode																									
Place	Contestant	1			2		3		4^{^{1}}		5	6		7		8	9		10		11		12		13		14
1	Pablo	IN		IMM	LOW	LOW	HIGH	IMM	LOW	IN	WIN	IN	WIN		HIGH	WIN	WIN	IMM	WIN	IMM	WIN	IMM	WIN	IMM	IN	LOW	WINNER
2	Francisco	IN		IMM	IN	IN	IN	IN	WIN	IMM	LOW	WIN	IMM		WIN	LOW	IN	LOW	HIGH	IMM	LOW	LOW	IN	WIN	IN	WIN	RUNNER-UP
3	Irina	IN		IMM	IN	WIN	IN	HIGH	WIN	IMM	WIN	WIN	IMM		HIGH	WIN	HIGH	IMM	IN	HIGH	HIGH	LOW	IN	LOW	WIN	ELIM	
4	Raissa		HIGH	IMM	LOW	HIGH	IN	WIN	HIGH	IMM	WIN	IN	HIGH		LOW	PT	LOW	HIGH	IN	WIN	LOW	WIN	IN	ELIM			
5	Lubyanka		LOW	LOW	LOW	HIGH	IN	IN	LOW	IN	HIGH	IN	HIGH		LOW	WIN	LOW	WIN	IN	LOW	HIGH	ELIM					
6	Monique		IN	IMM	HIGH	IMM	IN	IN	IN	HIGH	WIN	IN	HIGH		IN	WIN	LOW	HIGH	IN	ELIM							
7	Ravi	LOW		LOW	IN	IN	WIN	IMM	IN	WIN	WIN	IN	LOW		HIGH	WIN	IN	ELIM									
8	Clécio		IN	IMM	HIGH	IMM	IN	IN	IN	IN	LOW	WIN	IMM		IN	ELIM											
9	Guilherme		LOW	LOW	IN	IN	HIGH	IMM	LOW	ELIM				RET	ELIM												
10	Angelica	WIN		IMM	IN	LOW	IN	LOW	IN	IN	WIN	IN	ELIM														
11	Mirna		WIN	IMM	WIN	IMM	IN	LOW	IN	LOW	ELIM																
12	William		IN	IMM	IN	IN	IN	ELIM																			
13	Berta	IN		IMM	IN	ELIM																					
14	Barbara	LOW		ELIM																							
15	Edney		ELIM																								
16	Pedro	ELIM																									

^Note 1 : Francisco won the Mystery Box challenge and advanced directly to next week, alongside Raissa who was the challenge's top entry. Guilherme, Lubyanka and Pablo were selected as the bottom entries and were not eligible to compete in the mini-challenge where the winner would guarantee an extra immunity. Irina won the challenge and also advanced, leaving eight contestants to compete in the Elimination Test.

Key

Winner	Runner-up	Individual challenge winner
Team challenge winner	Team challenge loser (PT)	Individual challenge top entry
Immunity	Saved first	Saved last
Immunity extra	Individual challenge bottom entry	Eliminated
Withdrew	Returned	Did not compete

== Ratings and reception ==
=== Brazilian ratings ===
All numbers are in points and provided by Kantar Ibope Media.

Week	Episode	Air date	Timeslot (BRT)	SP viewers (in points)	Rank timeslot	BR viewers (in points)	Rank network	Source
1	Top 16	September 5, 2017	Tuesday 10:30 p.m.	5.8	3	3.9	3	
2	Top 13	September 12, 2017	Tuesday 10:30 p.m.	4.4	4	3.6	4	
3	Top 12	September 19, 2017	Tuesday 10:30 p.m.	4.3	4	3.6	3	
4	Top 11	September 26, 2017	Tuesday 10:30 p.m.	4.8	4	4.1	4	
5	Top 10	October 3, 2017	Tuesday 10:30 p.m.	5.3	4	4.5	1	
6	Top 9	October 10, 2017	Tuesday 10:30 p.m.	3.5	4	2.5	5	
7	Top 9 Redux	October 17, 2017	Tuesday 10:30 p.m.	4.8	4	3.9	3	
8	Top 8	October 24, 2017	Tuesday 10:30 p.m.	5.2	4	3.9	2	
9	Top 7	October 31, 2017	Tuesday 10:30 p.m.	5.4	4	4.0	3	
10	Top 6	November 7, 2017	Tuesday 10:30 p.m.	5.2	4	3.9	2	
11	Top 5	November 14, 2017	Tuesday 10:30 p.m.	5.1	4	3.8	2	
12	Top 4	November 21, 2017	Tuesday 10:30 p.m.	4.2	4	3.6	4	
13	Top 3	November 28, 2017	Tuesday 10:30 p.m.	4.8	4	4.2	1	
14	Winner announced	December 5, 2017	Tuesday 10:30 p.m.	5.3	4	4.4	1	

- In 2017, each point represents 245.700 households in 15 market cities in Brazil (70.500 households in São Paulo)

Note: Episode 2 aired against the season premiere of A Fazenda: Nova Chance.
Note: Episode 6 aired against a special episode of telenovela A Força do Querer.
Note: Episode 14 aired against a special 'The Battles' episode of The Voice Brasil.
