= MasterChef Profissionais season 3 =

MasterChef Profissionais
- Season 3
- Presented by: Ana Paula Padrão
- Judges: Érick Jacquin; Paola Carosella; Henrique Fogaça
- No. of contestants: 14
- Winner: Rafael
- Runner-up: Willian
- No. of episodes: 17

Release
- Original network: Band
- Original release: August 21 – December 11, 2018

Season chronology
- ← Previous; Season 2 Next → Season 4

The third season of the Brazilian competitive reality television series MasterChef Profissionais premiered on 21 August at 10:30 p.m. on Band.

Chef Rafael Gomes won the competition over chef Willian Peters on 11 December 2018.

== Contestants ==
=== Top 14 ===
Contestant	Age	Hometown	Result	Winnings	Finish
Rafael Gomes	35	Niterói	Winner on December 11	8	1st
Willian Peters	33	Porto Alegre	Runner-up on December 11	7	2nd
Heaven Delhaye	33	Petrópolis	Eliminated on December 4	6	3rd
Manoela Lebron	31	Uberaba	Eliminated on November 27	6	4th
Daniel Barbosa	27	Campo Grande	Eliminated on November 20	6	5th
Andre Pionteke	27	Curitiba	Eliminated on November 13	5	6th
Adriana Avelar	35	Ituiutaba	Eliminated on November 6	1	7th
Roberta Magro	28	Atibaia	Eliminated on October 30	1	8th
Thales Alves	25	Formosa	Eliminated on October 16	2	9th
Marcela Calegari	26	São Paulo	Eliminated on October 9	2	10th
Adriana Avelar	35	Ituiutaba	Eliminated on October 2	1	Returned on October 23
Paulo Quintella	26	Maceió	Eliminated on September 25	1	11th
Simone Bert	57	Maceió	Eliminated on September 18	1	12th
Alex Lee	30	Jacareí	Eliminated on September 11	1	13th
André Rochadel	33	Brasília	Eliminated on September 4	0	14th

== Elimination table ==
Place	Contestant	Episode																							
Place	Contestant	3	4		5	6		7	8		9	10		11	12		13		14		15		16		17
1	Rafael	PT	IN	IN	WIN	LOW	WIN	WIN	IN	WIN	NPT			WIN	HIGH	IN	WIN		IN	LOW	WIN	IMM	WIN	IMM	WINNER
2	Willian	WIN	IN	IN	HIGH	WIN	IMM	PT	WIN	IMM	NPT			LOW	HIGH	LOW	WIN		WIN	IMM	IN	WIN	IN	WIN	RUNNER-UP
3	Heaven	WIN	HIGH	IMM	WIN	IN	HIGH	WIN	LOW	LOW	LOW			WIN	HIGH	WIN	NPT		HIGH	WIN	IN	LOW	HIGH	ELIM	
4	Manoela	NPT	IN	WIN	WIN	IN	IN	WIN	WIN	IMM	PT			WIN	LOW	LOW	WIN	LOW	IN	HIGH	IN	ELIM			
5	Daniel	WIN	HIGH	IMM	WIN	LOW	IN	WIN	LOW	HIGH	NPT			WIN	WIN	IMM	WIN		LOW	ELIM					
6	Andre P.	NPT	HIGH	IMM	WIN	HIGH	IMM	WIN	WIN	IMM	WIN			WIN	LOW	IN	ELIM								
7	Adriana	WIN	LOW	IN	LOW	HIGH	IMM	ELIM				HIGH	RET	LOW	HIGH	ELIM									
8	Roberta	LOW	IN	HIGH	WIN	IN	LOW	PT	IN	IN	NPT			ELIM											
9	Thales	WIN	WIN	IMM	NPT	LOW	IN	PT	IN	IN	ELIM														
10	Marcela	PT	IN	IN	WIN	IN	IN	WIN	LOW	ELIM															
11	Paulo	WIN	LOW	IN	LOW	IN	ELIM																		
12	Simone	WIN	LOW	LOW	ELIM																				
13	Alex	WIN	IN	ELIM																					
14	André R.	ELIM																							

Key

Winner	Runner-up	Individual challenge winner
Team challenge winner	Team challenge loser (PT)	Individual challenge top entry
Immunity	Saved first	Saved last
Immunity extra	Individual challenge bottom entry	Eliminated
Withdrew	Returned	Did not compete

== Ratings and reception ==
=== Brazilian ratings ===
All numbers are in points and provided by Kantar Ibope Media.

Week	Episode	Air date	Timeslot (BRT)	SP viewers (in points)	Rank timeslot	BR viewers (in points)	Rank network	Source
1	Top 26 – Duels (1)	21 August 2018	Tuesday 10:30 p.m.	5.0	4	3.9	1	
2	Top 26 – Duels (2)	28 August 2018	Tuesday 10:30 p.m.	5.1	4	3.9	1	
3	Top 14	4 September 2018	Tuesday 10:30 p.m.	4.2	4	3.1	2	
4	Top 13	11 September 2018	Tuesday 10:30 p.m.	4.0	4	3.1	2	
5	Top 12	18 September 2018	Tuesday 10:30 p.m.	3.8	4	2.9	2	
6	Top 11	25 September 2018	Tuesday 10:30 p.m.	3.6	4	2.8	3	
7	Top 10	2 October 2018	Tuesday 10:30 p.m.	3.8	4	2.8	2	
8	Top 9	9 October 2018	Tuesday 10:30 p.m.	4.0	4	3.1	2	
9	Top 8	16 October 2018	Tuesday 10:30 p.m.	3.4	4	2.9	2	
10	Reinstation challenge	23 October 2018	Tuesday 10:30 p.m.	3.9	4	3.1	2	
11	Top 8 Redux	30 October 2018	Tuesday 10:30 p.m.	3.6	4	3.1	2	
12	Top 7	6 November 2018	Tuesday 10:30 p.m.	3.4	4	2.8	2	
13	Top 6	13 November 2018	Tuesday 10:30 p.m.	3.7	4	3.3	1	
14	Top 5	20 November 2018	Tuesday 10:30 p.m.	3.6	4	3.4	2	
15	Top 4	27 November 2018	Tuesday 10:30 p.m.	3.6	4	3.3	2	
16	Top 3	4 December 2018	Tuesday 10:30 p.m.	4.0	4	3.4	1	
17	Winner announced	11 December 2018	Tuesday 10:30 p.m.	5.0	4	4.3	1	

- In 2018, each point represents 248.647 households in 15 market cities in Brazil (71.855 households in São Paulo)
