= MasterChef Profissionais season 1 =

MasterChef Profissionais
- Season 1
- Presented by: Ana Paula Padrão
- Judges: Érick Jacquin; Paola Carosella; Henrique Fogaça
- No. of contestants: 14
- Winner: Dayse
- Runner-up: Marcelo
- No. of episodes: 11

Release
- Original network: Band
- Original release: October 4 – December 13, 2016

Season chronology
- Next → Season 2

The first season of the Brazilian competitive reality television series MasterChef Profissionais premiered on 4 October 2016 at 10:30 p.m. on Band.

The grand prize was R$170.000 cash prize, a brand new Nissan Kicks, a year's supply on Carrefour worth R$1.000 per month and the MasterChef Profissionais trophy.

Chef Dayse Paparoto won the competition over chef Marcelo Verde on 13 December 2016.

== Contestants ==
=== Top 14 ===
| Contestant | Age | Hometown | Result | Winnings | Finish |
|---|---|---|---|---|---|
| Dayse Paparoto | 31 | Mogi das Cruzes | Winner on December 13 | 8 | 1st |
| Marcelo Verde | 27 | São Paulo | Runner-up on December 13 | 7 | 2nd |
| Dário Costa | 28 | Santos | Eliminated on December 6 | 3 | 3rd |
| Ivo Lopes | 40 | João Alfredo | Eliminated on November 29 | 4 | 4th |
| Fádia Cheaito | 25 | Americana | Eliminated on November 22 | 3 | 5th |
| João Lima | 30 | São Lourenço da Mata | Eliminated on November 15 | 3 | 6th |
| Priscylla Luswarghi | 27 | Araçatuba | Eliminated on November 8 | 3 | 7th |
| Luiz Filipe Jacob | 25 | São Roque | Eliminated on November 1 | 1 | 8th |
| Rodrigo Einsfeld | 35 | Petrópolis | Eliminated on October 25 | 1 | 9th |
| Izabela Dolabela | 30 | Nova Lima | Eliminated on October 18 | 0 | 10th |
| Ricardo Bonomi | 40 | Campinas | Eliminated on October 11 | 0 | 11th |
| Izadora Dantas | 31 | São Paulo | Eliminated on October 4 | 0 | 12th |
| Fernanda Emerich | 27 | Nova Friburgo | Eliminated on October 4 | 0 | 13th |
| Eliane Carvalho | 54 | Cuiabá | Eliminated on October 4 | 0 | 14th |

== Elimination table ==
| Place | Contestant | Episode | | | | | | | | | | | | | | | | | |
| Place | Contestant | 1 | | | 2 | | 3 | 4 | | 5 | 6 | 7 | 8 | | 9 | | 10 | | 11 |
|---|---|---|---|---|---|---|---|---|---|---|---|---|---|---|---|---|---|---|---|
| 1 | Dayse | HIGH | | IMM | WIN | IMM | PT | HIGH | IMM | WIN | WIN | WIN | WIN | IMM | HIGH | WIN | HIGH | WIN | WINNER |
| 2 | Marcelo | | LOW | HIGH | IN | IN | WIN | LOW | WIN | WIN | WIN | WIN | IN | LOW | WIN | IMM | WIN | IMM | RUNNER-UP |
| 3 | Dário | | WIN | IMM | HIGH | HIGH | PT | HIGH | IMM | LOW | PT | WIN | LOW | WIN | IN | LOW | IN | ELIM | |
| 4 | Ivo | WIN | | IMM | HIGH | IMM | WIN | LOW | HIGH | WIN | LOW | WIN | HIGH | IMM | IN | ELIM | | | |
| 5 | Fádia | HIGH | | IMM | IN | IN | LOW | WIN | IMM | WIN | WIN | LOW | IN | ELIM | | | | | |
| 6 | João | LOW | | HIGH | IN | HIGH | WIN | IN | IN | WIN | WIN | ELIM | | | | | | | |
| 7 | Priscylla | HIGH | | IMM | HIGH | WIN | WIN | IN | IN | WIN | ELIM | | | | | | | | |
| 8 | Luiz Filipe | | HIGH | IMM | HIGH | IMM | WIN | LOW | IN | ELIM | | | | | | | | | |
| 9 | Rodrigo | LOW | | LOW | IN | LOW | WIN | IN | ELIM | | | | | | | | | | |
| 10 | Izabela | | IN | IMM | IN | LOW | ELIM | | | | | | | | | | | | |
| 11 | Ricardo | | IN | IMM | HIGH | ELIM | | | | | | | | | | | | | |
| 12 | Izadora | | LOW | ELIM | | | | | | | | | | | | | | | |
| 13 | Fernanda | | ELIM | | | | | | | | | | | | | | | | |
| 14 | Eliane | ELIM | | | | | | | | | | | | | | | | | |

Key

- The cook won MasterChef Profissionais.
- The cook was the runner-up.
- The cook won the individual challenge (Mystery Box or Elimination Test).
- The cook was one of the top entries in the individual challenge but did not win.
- The cook did not have to compete in that round and was safe from elimination.
- The cook was not selected as a top or bottom entry in an individual challenge.
- The cook was one of the bottom entries in the Mystery Box and received a disadvantaged in the Elimination Test.
- The cook was on the winning team in the Team Challenge.
- The cook was on the losing team in the Team Challenge.
- The cook was one of the bottom entries in an individual challenge but was saved first.
- The cook was one of the bottom entries in an individual challenge but was saved last.
- The cook won the Reinstation Challenge and returned to the competition.
- The cook was not eligible to compete in that round.
- The cook had to withdraw from the competition.
- The cook was eliminated from MasterChef Profissionais.

== Ratings and reception ==
=== Brazilian ratings ===
All numbers are in points and provided by Kantar Ibope Media.

| Episode | Title | Air date | Timeslot (BRT) | SP viewers (in points) | Ref. |
|---|---|---|---|---|---|
| 1 | Top 14 | 4 October 2016 | Tuesday 10:30 p.m. | 6.6 | |
| 2 | Top 11 | 11 October 2016 | Tuesday 10:30 p.m. | 5.0 | |
| 3 | Top 10 | 18 October 2016 | Tuesday 10:30 p.m. | 7.0 | |
| 4 | Top 9 | 25 October 2016 | Tuesday 10:30 p.m. | 6.5 | |
| 5 | Top 8 | 1 November 2016 | Tuesday 10:30 p.m. | 7.1 | |
| 6 | Top 7 | 8 November 2016 | Tuesday 10:30 p.m. | 7.1 | |
| 7 | Top 6 | 15 November 2016 | Tuesday 10:30 p.m. | 6.6 | |
| 8 | Top 5 | 22 November 2016 | Tuesday 10:30 p.m. | 8.3 | |
| 9 | Top 4 | 29 November 2016 | Tuesday 10:30 p.m. | 6.4 | |
| 10 | Top 3 | 6 December 2016 | Tuesday 10:30 p.m. | 7.3 | |
| 11 | Winner announced | 13 December 2016 | Tuesday 10:30 p.m. | 7.4 | |
| S | Reunion | 20 December 2016 | Tuesday 10:30 p.m. | 2.8 | |

- In 2016, each point represents 69.417 households in São Paulo.

Note: Episode 2 aired against the Venezuela vs. Brazil football match for the 2018 FIFA World Cup qualification.
