= Vila Nova Conceição =

Neighborhood in São Paulo, Brazil

- Bairro (Neighborhood)
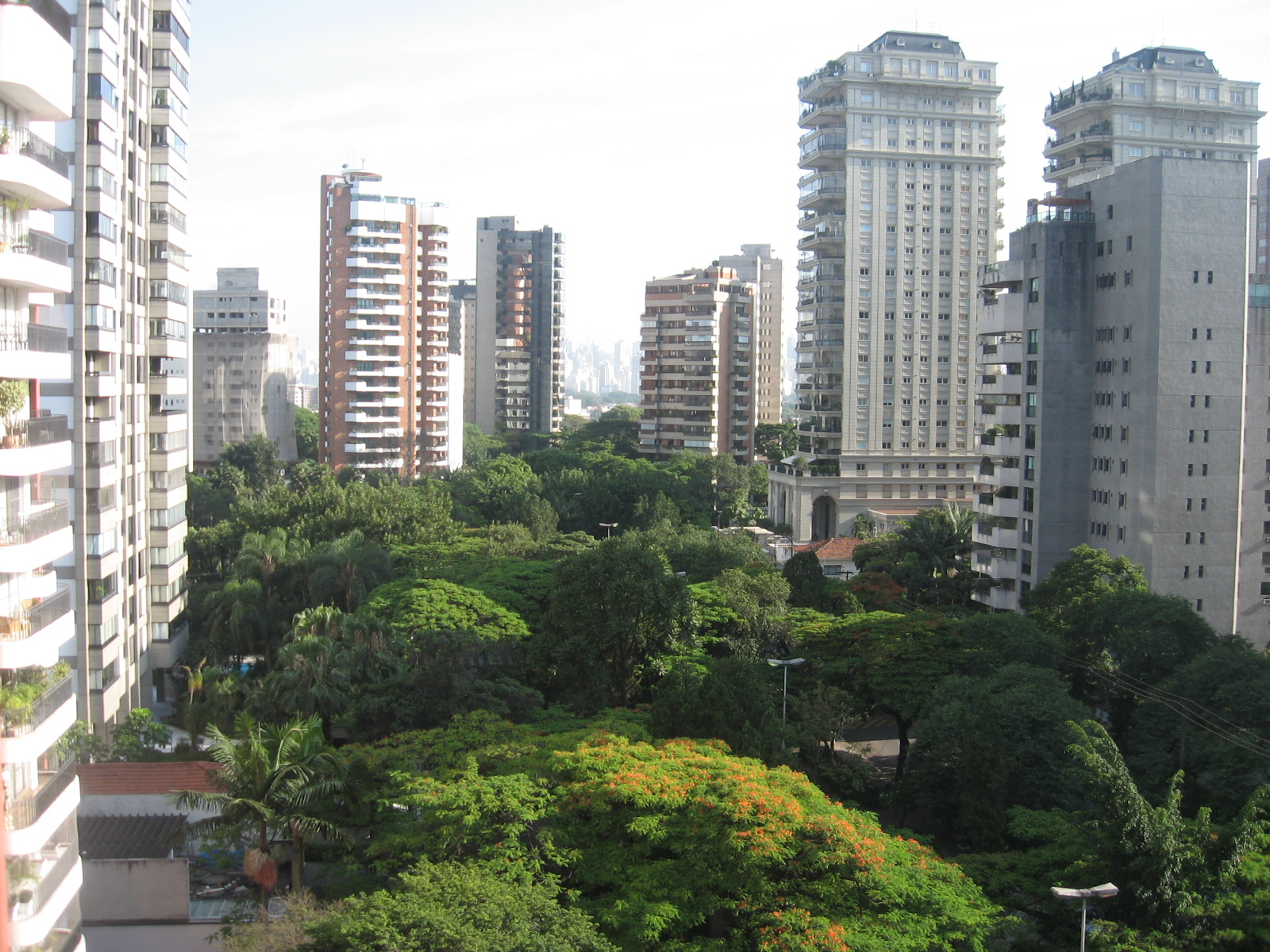

- Location within Brazil
- Country: Brazil
- State: São Paulo
- Municipality: São Paulo
- District: Moema
- Founded: 25 January 1936

Area
  - Total: 1.08 km^{2} (0.42 sq mi)
- Time zone: UTC-03:00 (BRT)

Vila Nova Conceição is an upscale neighborhood located in the South Zone of the city of São Paulo, within the Moema district, which is administered by the Vila Mariana Subprefecture. It is considered one of the neighborhoods with the highest property values per square meter in the city. It borders the neighborhoods of Moema, Jardim Lusitânia, Itaim Bibi, Jardim Paulista, Vila Olímpia, and Ibirapuera Park.

== History ==
The neighborhood has its origins in small farms dedicated to dairy production. Until the 19th century, it was an essentially rural region, supplying milk and meat to residents of other neighborhoods scattered throughout the city of São Paulo. In 1885, with the opening of a slaughterhouse in the area that is now Vila Clementino, a tram station was established in Ibirapuera, leading to a slow but steady development of the surrounding area. Throughout the 20th century, Vila Nova Conceição was also home to small farms owned by Portuguese and Italian settlers, who sold their fruits and vegetables at the market in Fernando Prestes square. Another area served as pasture for cattle, which were taken to the Municipal Slaughterhouse. In 1916, the city government incorporated a large area in the region into its assets, which was preserved by the municipal administration and later transformed into Ibirapuera Park.

Vila Nova Conceição was officially founded in January 1936, with the subdivision of a farm called Santa Maria. It was during this period that Vila Nova Conceição began to expand in size and population density, receiving public investments in basic sanitation, paving, and street lighting. Even with its growing development in the 1960s, the neighborhood was still considered to have been relatively calm, with many trees and streams such as the Sapateiro (where Juscelino Kubitschek Avenue runs today) and the Uberaba (over which Hélio Pellegrino Avenue was built). The neighborhood, considered an extension of the Ibirapuera Park area due to its abundance of green spaces, experienced significant population growth beginning in the 1950s. This led to the implementation of measures designed to ensure the preservation of the area’s original characteristics.

Starting in the 1980s, as properties in Jardins and Itaim Bibi became scarce, the small area bounded by Ibirapuera Park, Santo Amaro Avenue, Antônio Joaquim de Moura Andrade Street, and Afonso Brás Street began to attract the attention of the real estate market. Since then, the old mansions of Vila Nova Conceição have been demolished and replaced by high-end buildings, triggering a rapid rise in the neighborhood’s height. Due to its tree-lined streets and proximity to the city, the area has become more desirable, attracting significant real estate investment, which has led to a shift in the socioeconomic profile of its residents, however it has also led to significant crowding in the area. Until 1995, the neighborhood was home to commercial establishments catering to the local community. Because of the opportunities the neighborhood offered due to its affluent residents, commercial businesses occupied irregular spaces in predominantly residential areas; this was the case with the upscale boutique Daslu.

In the 1990s, major infrastructure projects were undertaken that had a significant impact on both commerce and traffic; these included Hélio Pellegrino Avenue, the Ayrton Senna Road Complex, and the bus corridor on Santo Amaro.

== Present ==
Today, Vila Nova Conceição is known as one of the most expensive and exclusive neighborhoods in São Paulo. The area boasts a comprehensive infrastructure, including renowned schools, hospitals, and a wide range of luxury services and shops. The residents are primarily executives, businesspeople, politicians and figures from the arts and cultural scenes. In addition to Ibirapuera Park, which offers a wide range of cultural and recreational activities, Vila Nova Conceição is also home to several art galleries, cafés, and fine-dining restaurants. The neighborhood is, for this reason, considered a center of culture and cuisine in São Paulo.

Vila Nova Conceição faces challenges common to upscale neighborhoods, such as pressure for new construction and the need to preserve green spaces and local identity. The neighborhood is home to 214 residential condominium complexes, comprising 6,014 apartments. Vila Nova Conceição is a high-rise neighborhood, with buildings averaging over 17 stories in height. The limited space available for new residential developments makes the price per square meter in the neighborhood one of the highest in the region. There are three civil society organizations that assist with the neighborhood’s urban maintenance: the Vila Nova Conceição Residents’ Association, the Ibirapuera Park Conservation Association, and the Friends of Pereira Coutinho Square Association.

As a neighborhood inhabited by São Paulo’s elite, it is a neighborhood where there are disputes and tensions between the city government and residents over zoning issues. In 2024, Mayor Ricardo Nunes (MDB) amended a minor revision to the city’s master plan, which had been approved by the City Council, to designate certain areas of the neighborhood as zones permitting high-rise development, changing them from strictly residential areas to commercial zones and sites for large developers, following pressure from the residents’ association. Residents' groups criticize the idea of densification, arguing that it will strip the neighborhood of its character, and they also criticize the lack of adequate infrastructure for new residents, claiming that the drainage and sewer systems are outdated. Due to the city's master plan, taller buildings are permitted only in specific areas of the neighborhood.

There are also several parks in the neighborhood, including the Praça Pereira Coutinho. The price per square meter in the neighborhood is one of the highest in the city. Some penthouses and large apartments (with areas exceeding 700 m²) can cost up to 15 million reais. This upscale neighborhood is classified as a “Zone A” by CRECI, the real estate regulatory agency, along with Higienópolis, Jardim América, and Pacaembu. The area is home to a campus of the Centro Universitário das Faculdades Metropolitanas Unidas (FMU), the Martim Francisco State School, and the Latvian, Myanmar, and Turkish consulates.

In 2024, according to a ranking published by the newspaper O Estado de São Paulo, the neighborhood had one street among the top 10 in the country in terms of real estate purchase prices per square meter, with Avenida República do Líbano (R$ 38,897) ranking 9th, as well as one street for rental properties: R. Prof. Atílio Innocenti (R$ 183.00), in fourth place. According to a CNN Brasil report, in 2026, the neighborhood was found to have the highest price per square meter in Brazil, reaching 21,000 reais, surpassing neighborhoods such as Leblon and Gávea in Rio de Janeiro and Itaim Bibi and Pinheiros, also in São Paulo.

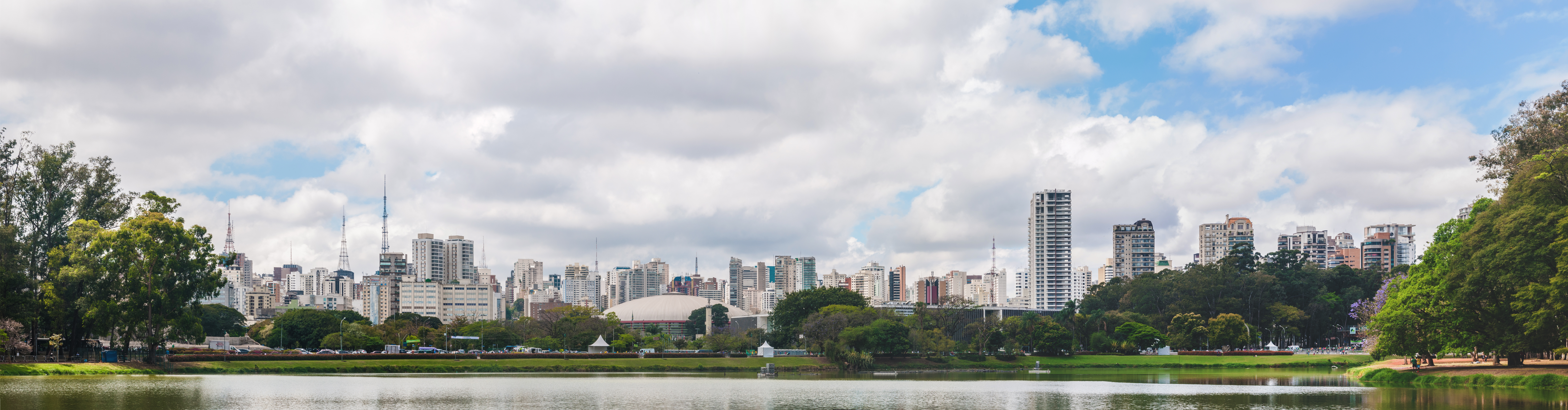
Panoramic photo of the São Paulo neighborhoods of Paraíso and Vila Nova Conceição, as seen from one of the lakes in Ibirapuera Park.

== Notable residents ==
- Clodovil Hernandes (1937–2009), fashion designer, TV host, and politician
- Mariana Weickert, model
- Pedro Moreira Salles, businessman
- Roberto Carlos, singer
