= Pesadelo na Cozinha =

- Genre: Reality television
- Based on: Ramsay's Kitchen Nightmares
- Directed by: Maxi Garcia Solla
- Starring: Érick Jacquin
- Country of origin: Brazil
- Original language: Portuguese
- No. of seasons: 4
- No. of episodes: 36

Production
- Running time: 90 minutes
- Production company: Endemol Shine Brasil

Original release
- Network: Band
- Release: 26 January 2017 – present

Pesadelo na Cozinha (transl. Nightmare in the Kitchen) is a Brazilian reality television show broadcast on Band network based on the British reality Ramsay's Kitchen Nightmares.

The TV show, commanded by French-Brazilian chef Érick Jacquin, has the objective to help restaurants which are going bankrupt. On 27 July 2017, a second season was confirmed to premiere in 2018, which was later delayed to 2019. In October 2019, a third season was confirmed to 2020. After the COVID-19 pandemic in Brazil, the production was suspended for undetermined time, but Band confirmed that the first 4 episodes would be released on 30 March 2021.

== Series overview ==
Season	Episodes	Originally aired	
Season	Episodes	Season premiere	Season finale
1	13	26 January 2017	20 April 2017
2	7	27 August 2019	8 October 2019
3	4	30 March 2021	20 April 2021
4	12	11 February 2025	29 April 2025
5	12	24 February 2026	12 May 2026

== Episodes ==
=== Season 1 (2017) ===
No. overall	No. in season	Restaurant	Location	Original release date
1	1	"Escondidinho da Amada"	Pinheiros, São Paulo	26 January 2017
2	2	"Najjah"	Santana, São Paulo	2 February 2017
3	3	"Saia do Padre"	Pompeia, São Paulo	9 February 2017
4	4	"Nahamalho"	Perdizes, São Paulo	16 February 2017
5	5	"Hooker"	Jardins, São Paulo	23 February 2017
6	6	"Fina Farina"	Vila Mariana, São Paulo	2 March 2017
Restaurant was renamed Zío during production.
7	7	"Samosa & Company"	Jardins, São Paulo	9 March 2017
8	8	"Burg One"	Jacarepaguá, Rio de Janeiro	16 March 2017
9	9	"La Cabaña"	Moema, São Paulo	23 March 2017
10	10	"Los Molinos"	Ipiranga, São Paulo	30 March 2017
11	11	"Sal e Pimenta"	Paraíso, São Paulo	6 April 2017
12	12	"Dedo de la Chica"	Vila Madalena, São Paulo	13 April 2017
13	13	"Trilha da Costela"	Mooca, São Paulo	20 April 2017

=== Season 2 (2019) ===
No. overall	No. in season	Restaurant	Location	Original release date
14	1	"Pé de Fava"	Tranquilidade, Guarulhos	27 August 2019
15	2	"Esporte Bar e Restaurante"	Santo Amaro, São Paulo	3 September 2019
Restaurant was renamed Antigo Bar during production.
16	3	"Alquimia Restaurante e Rotisseria"	Barra Funda, São Paulo	10 September 2019
17	4	"Hero's Burger"	Pinheiros, São Paulo	17 September 2019
18	5	"El Maktub"	Vila Carrão, São Paulo	24 September 2019
19	6	"Joka's Grill"	Itaim Bibi, São Paulo	1 October 2019
20	7	"Bawarchi"	Vila Mariana, São Paulo	8 October 2019

=== Season 3 (2021) ===
No. overall	No. in season	Restaurant	Location	Original release date
21	1	"Mamma Júlia"	Bixiga, São Paulo	30 March 2021
22	2	"Ça-Va"	Bela Vista, São Paulo	6 April 2021
23	3	"Estrela de Roma"	Lapa, São Paulo	13 April 2021
24	4	"Kitanda"	Vila Romana, São Paulo	20 April 2021
Restaurant was renamed Casa da Tânea during production.

=== Season 4 (2025) ===
No. overall	No. in season	Restaurant	Location	Original release date
25	1	"Em Nome do Pai"	Vila Progredior, São Paulo	11 February 2025
26	2	"Bar do Dedé"	Socorro, São Paulo	18 February 2025
27	3	"Cia do Showrrasco"	Pompeia, São Paulo	25 February 2025
28	4	"Alternativa"	Vila Madalena, São Paulo	4 March 2025
29	5	"Nina's"	Jardim Ipanema, Guarulhos	11 March 2025
Restaurant was renamed O Pensador during production.
30	6	"Casa do Sírio"	Jardim Bonfiglioli, São Paulo	18 March 2025
31	7	"Dona Acarajé"	Jaçanã, São Paulo	25 March 2025
32	8	"Monalisa"	República, São Paulo	1 April 2025
33	9	"Dona Emília"	Santa Ifigênia, São Paulo	8 April 2025
34	10	"Rock Dog"	Vila Campesina, Osasco	15 April 2025
35	11	"Bar Amigo Giannotti"	Bixiga, São Paulo	22 April 2025
36	12	"Jerky's"	República, São Paulo	29 April 2025

=== Season 5 (2026) ===
No. overall	No. in season	Restaurant	Location	Original release date
37	1	"Casa do Norte"	Barra Funda, São Paulo	25 February 2026
38	2	"Boteco Malum"	Alto de Pinheiros, São Paulo	3 March 2026
Restaurant was renamed Boteco da Vera during production.
39	3	"Cabana Jubarte"	Taperapuã, Porto Seguro	10 March 2026
40	4	"Bar do Pio"	Alto da Lapa, São Paulo	17 March 2026
41	5	"Caravelas"	Riacho Grande, São Bernardo do Campo	24 March 2026
42	6	"La Cantina"	Jardim, Santo André	31 March 2026
43	7	"Café Cultura Bar"	Lourdes, Belo Horizonte	7 April 2026
44	8	"O Pátio"	Tremembé, São Paulo	14 April 2026
45	9	"Panelão do 14"	Tucuruvi, São Paulo	21 April 2026
46	10	"Arena Nacional"	Barra Funda, São Paulo	25 April 2026
47	11	"Bar do César"	Planalto Paulista, São Paulo	5 May 2026
48	12	"Shawarma do Tio Ali"	Itaipu A, Foz do Iguaçu	12 May 2026

== Criticism ==
Before its premiere, the choice of Érick Jacquin to present the TV show was criticized by Danielle Dahoui, chef and presenter of the fourth season of Hell's Kitchen: Cozinha sob Pressão. In an interview to UOL, she criticized Jacquin's attitude and what he represents: "But how does a person [...] who has millions of labour lawsuits, will present a show like this?"

Writing to Observatório da Televisão, Endrigo Annyston said that the "main problem of Pesadelo na Cozinha is being fake in excess [...] it doesn't show the truth. If the TV shows Casos de Família and João Kléber Show raise doubts about the veracity of the cases presented, the reality show appears to be extremely rehearsed. [...] This is common in televisive attractions, not everything is improvised. The problem is to make the acting so obvious."

Two years after the airing of Hero's Burger episode, chef Marco Ungaro stated in an interview that his participation was rigged. According to him, Band didn't know, but the purpose of his participation was to boost the image of the burger shop and, to do that, the restaurant team made a deal to show a negative side of Marco, so his participation wouldn't affect the show.

== Awards ==
Ano	Prêmio	Categoria	Resultado
2019	Troféu APCA	Best TV Show	Nominated
2019	Melhores do Ano NaTelinha	Best Reality	Nominated
2019	Prêmio Contigo! Online	Best Reality Show	Nominated

== See also ==
- Ramsay's Kitchen Nightmares, British version presented by Gordon Ramsay
- Kitchen Nightmares, American version also presented by Gordon Ramsay
