= Hospital Sírio-Libanês =

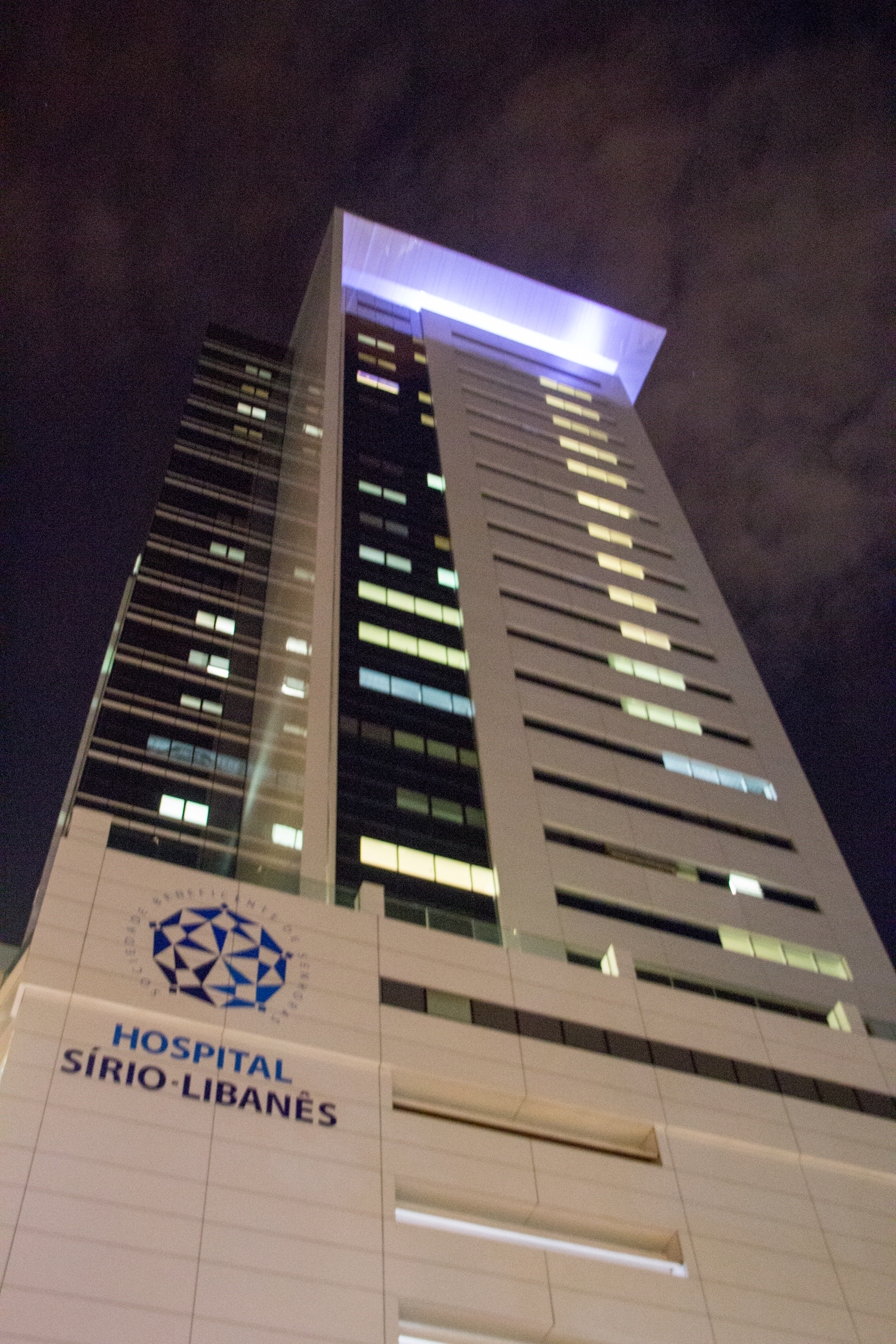
- The "Hospital Sírio-Libanês"

Geography
- Location: Bela Vista, São Paulo, SP, Brazil
- Coordinates: 23°33′25″S 46°39′16″W

Links
- Website: www.hospitalsiriolibanes.org.br

The Hospital Sírio-Libanês (English: Syrian-Lebanese Hospital) is a private hospital, located in Bela Vista neighborhood, in the city of São Paulo, Brazil. The hospital was founded by the Syrian and Lebanese community of São Paulo in 1965. It is one of the most well-known hospitals in Brazil due to the high quality of care. In 2024 it was ranked among the top 100 best hospitals in the world by a survey of specialists and patients, being the second best in Brazil.

== Complex ==
The main complex is located in the Bela Vista district, next to Paulista Avenue, central zone. Other units are located in Itaim Bibi and Jardins both in São Paulo and an oncology unit found in the Brazilian capital Brasília.

The hospital is divided into various units:

- Bela Vista, São Paulo - Hospital complex, including hospitalization units, surgical center, diagnostic center and emergencies.
- Itaim Bibi, São Paulo - Diagnostics center, day hospital, health accompaniment center and check-up center, human reproduction center and vein treatment center.
- Jardins, São Paulo - Attention unit.
- Brasília - Oncology center.

On 1 July 2010, the hospital was visited by Syrian president Bashar al-Assad and his wife Asma al-Assad during their official visit to Brazil, awarding its director Dr. Riad Younis with the Syrian Order of Merit.

== See also ==
- List of hospitals in Brazil
