= Vila Olímpia (CPTM) =

Railway station in São Paulo, Brazil

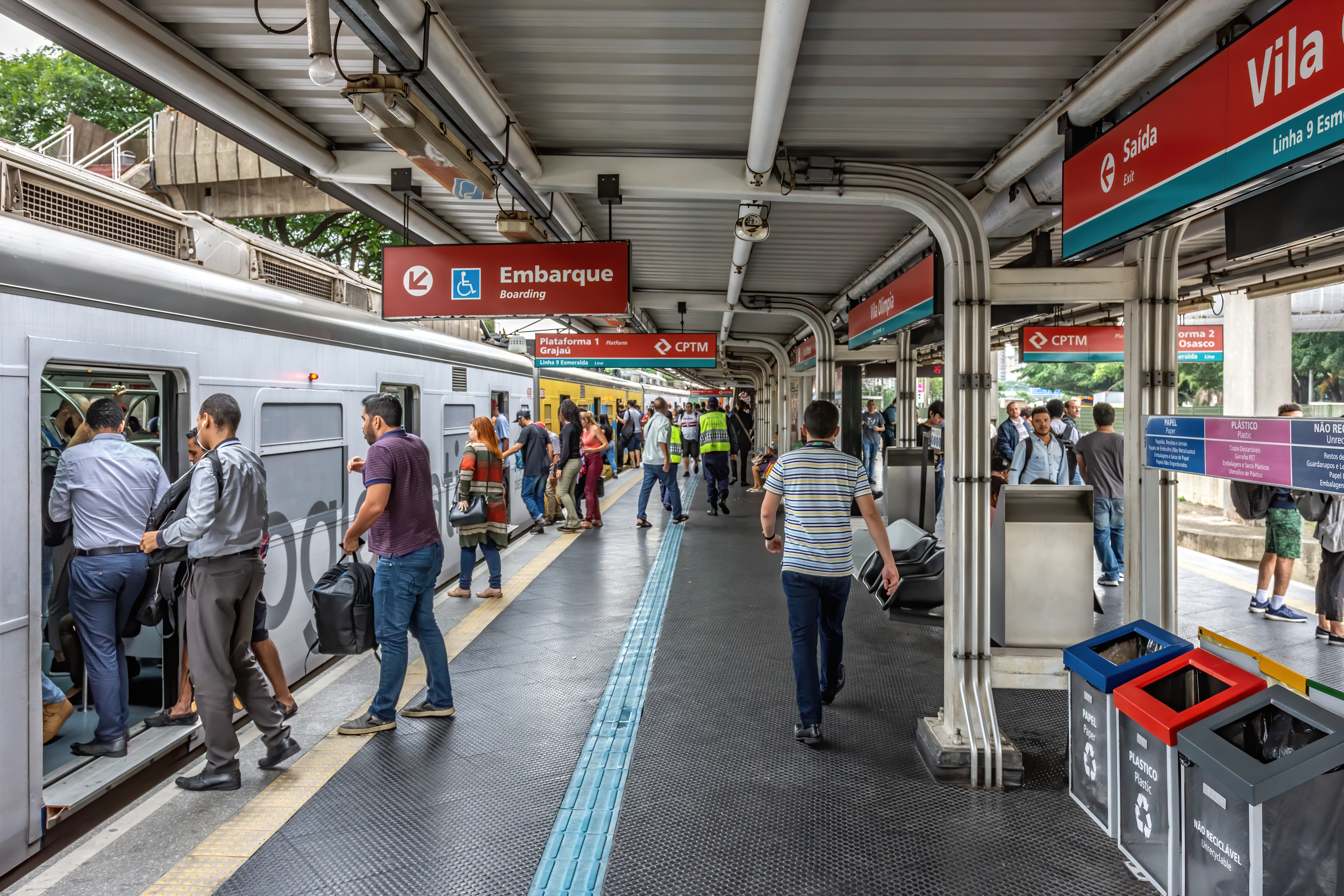
- View of Platform 1 (towards Mendes-Vila Natal) of Vila Olímpia station.

General information
- Location: Av. das Nações Unidas, 10900, Itaim Bibi; São Paulo; Brazil
- Coordinates: 23.593477°S 46.69271°W
- Owner: Government of the State of São Paulo
- Operator: ViaMobilidade Linhas 8 e 9 (Motiva)
- Platforms: Island platform

Construction
- Structure type: At-grade
- Architect: Luiz Carlos Esteves

Other information
- Station code: VOL

History
- Opened: 23 March 2001; 25 years ago

Services
Preceding station	São Paulo Metropolitan Trains	Following station
Cidade Jardim towards Osasco	Line 9	Berrini towards Varginha
Track layout
Location

Vila Olímpia is a train station on ViaMobilidade Linhas 8 e 9 Line 9-Emerald, located in the district of Itaim Bibi in São Paulo.

== History ==
The station was built by CPTM, during the "South Line Dinamization" project, opened on 23 March 2001. It is located in Vila Olímpia, next to Lift Station of Metropolitan Company of Water and Energy.
