= Vila Olímpia =

- São Paulo neighborhood
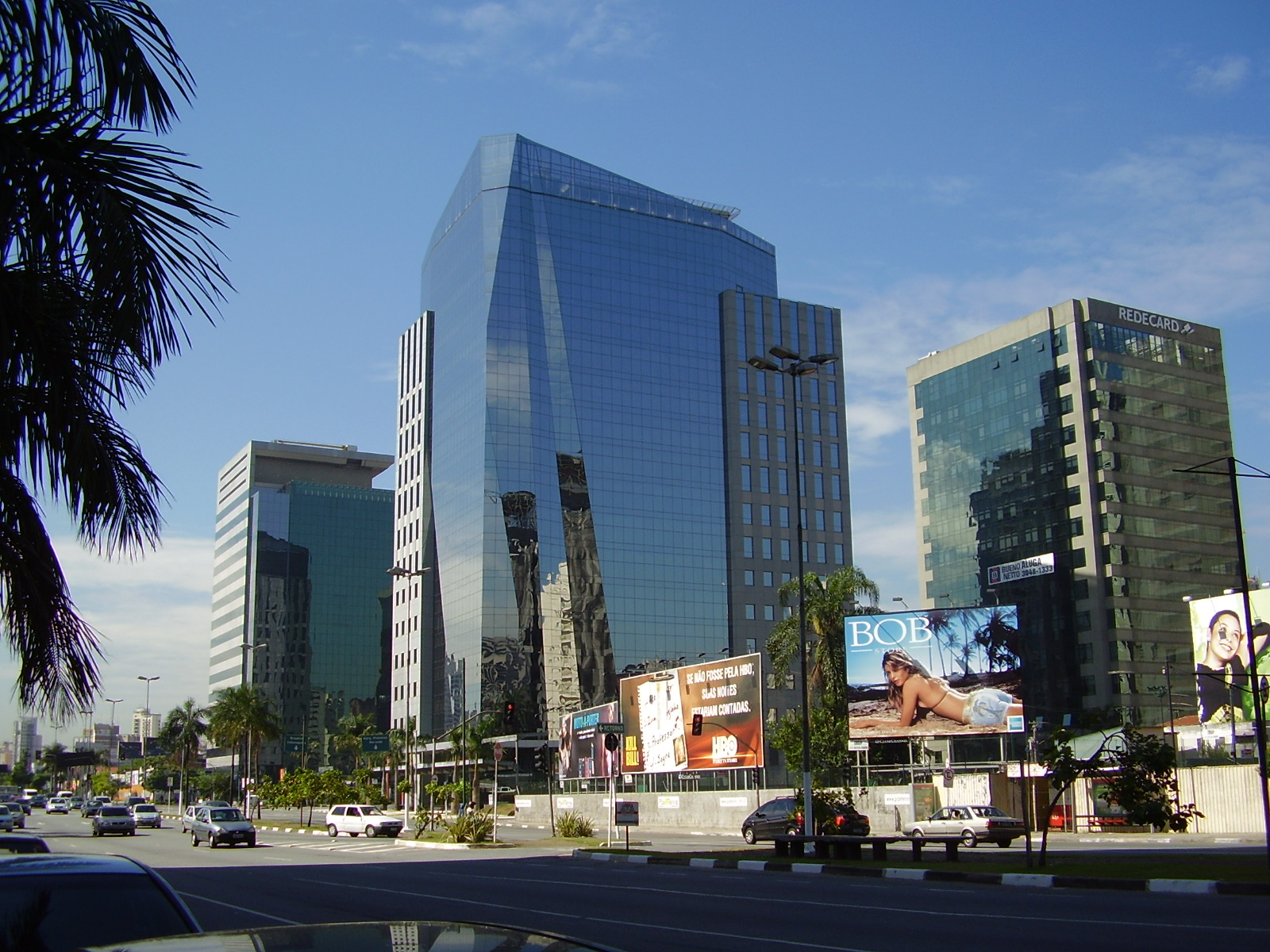

- Location within São Paulo Location within Brazil
- Coordinates: 23°35′34″S 46°41′30″W
- Country: Brazil
- Region: Southeast
- State: São Paulo
- Municipality: São Paulo
- Administrative Zone: West
- Subprefecture: Pinheiros
- District: Itaim Bibi

The Vila Olímpia (in English 'Olympia Village') is an upper-class neighborhood in the district of Itaim Bibi in the city of São Paulo, Brazil.

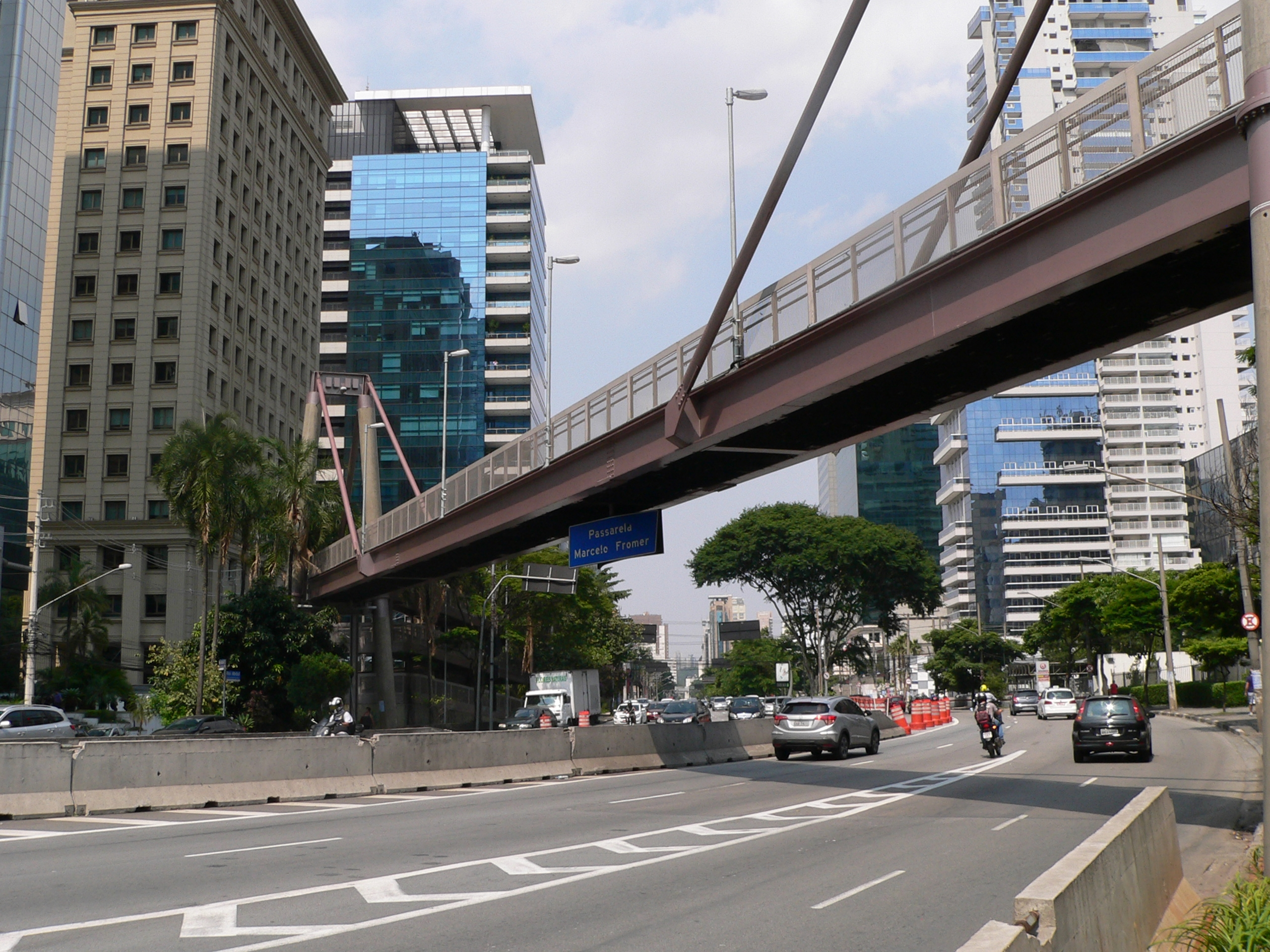
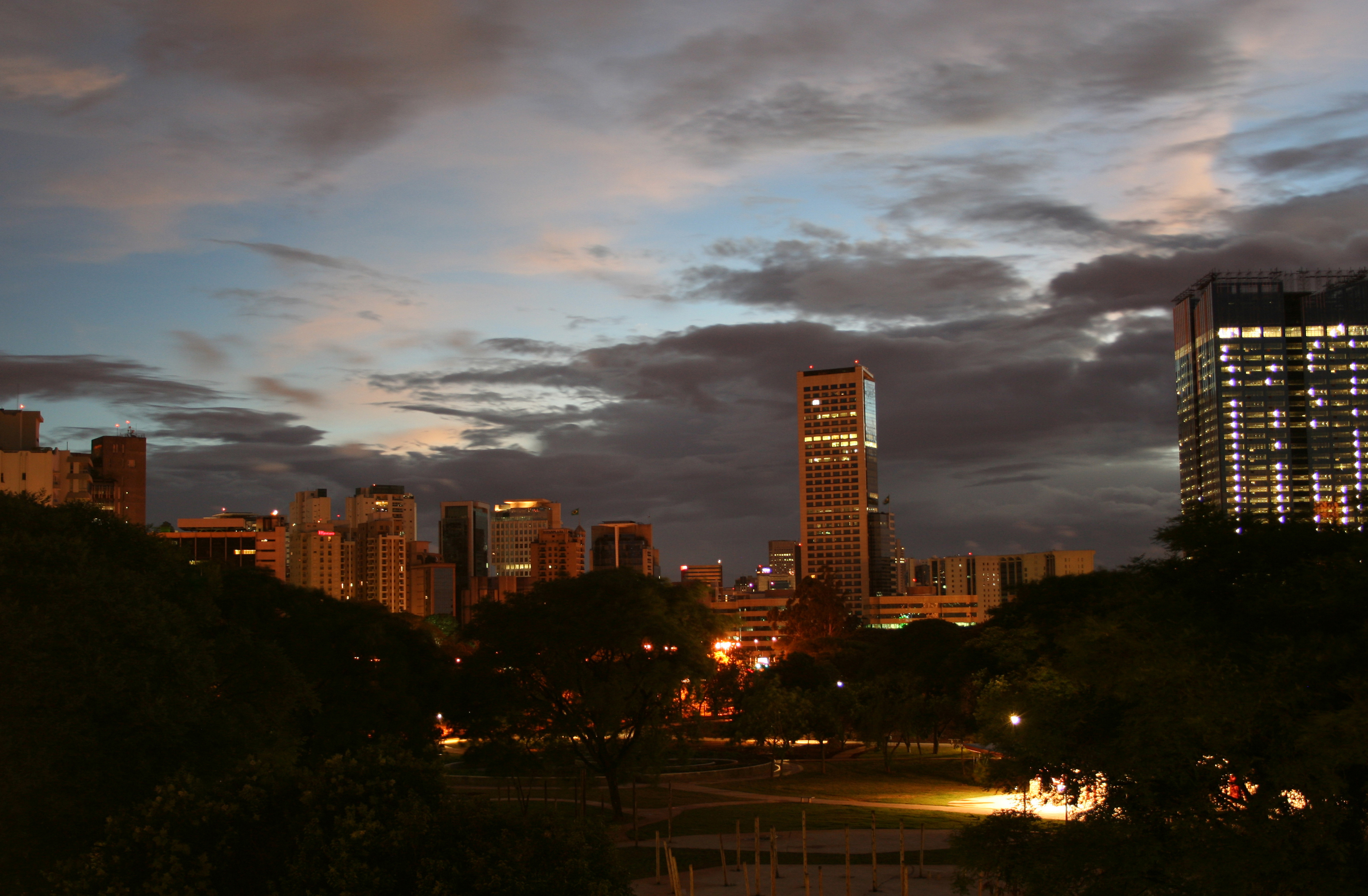
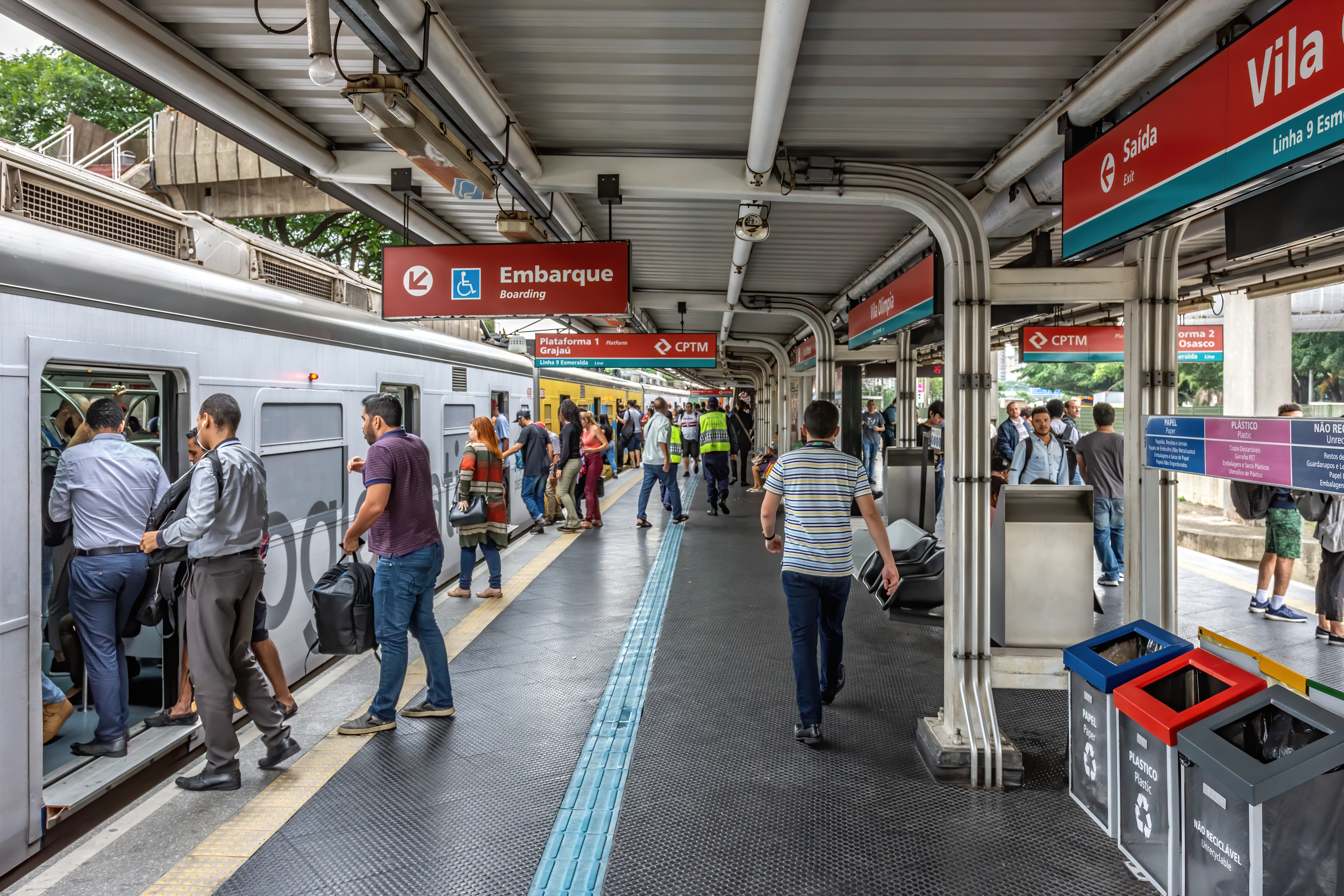

Vila Olímpia is home to the Brazilian offices of several multinational companies including Unilever, Google, Yahoo!, CNET, Intel, Symantec, Microsoft, among many others.

The region is also well known for its nightlife district with several bars and nightclubs.

Another highlight of the neighborhood is Daslu, a megastore aimed at the luxury market. It is the largest enterprise of its kind in Latin America and one of the largest in the world. Vila Olímpia also contains the E-Tower, the 5th tallest skyscraper in the city and the 12th tallest in Brazil.
