= Pró-Vida =

Occultist organization in Brazil, founded in 1978

Pro-Vida, Cosmic Integration (or simply Pro-Vida) is an occultist organization of esoteric kind founded by gynecologist Celso Charuri in 1979. It has operated in the State of São Paulo since its foundation, with its headquarters located in a luxurious, heavily guarded building in an upper-middle-class neighborhood of São Paulo, Alto de Pinheiros. It also maintains a country club in Araçoiaba da Serra, with a kind of gated community where the wealthiest members usually spend their weekends.

The organization presents itself as a ‘philosophical school’. In courses whose syllabus and content are disclosed only to paying participants, it makes promises of a ‘paradise on Earth’, in a manner similar to cults and churches.

== Theology ==
Pro-Vida presents itself as a vehicle that would alter people's consciousness to integrate them into what it calls ‘cosmic consciousness’, a universal harmony that would prepare for the arrival of the New Age (the Age of Aquarius). Its theology resembles that of the Findhorn Foundation, that is, it is influenced by Theosophy and the Human Potential Movement. Its foundations are very similar to other esoteric movements, such as the Rosicrucian Order and Freemasonry, but with an updated language that seeks to associate individuals from the economic elite, fitting into what are called New religious movements.

In the book Como vai a sua mente? (How Is Your Mind?), Celso Charuri explains the theology of Pro-Vida, a syncretism between Christianity, Kardecism, and the occultism of Helena Blavatsky.

The organization collects tithes, just like other religious institutions, through what it calls the Central Geral do Dízimo (General Tithing Center). According to its founder, the tithe derives from an ‘ancient law of Christ, promulgated 2,000 years ago,’ but existing since what he calls the ‘Adamic race’, at the beginning of the Old Testament, according to which only those who pay the tithe are able to inhabit more evolved places of existence (called the ‘fourth dimension’). Such a law, he claims, would be written in the Pyramid of Cheops.

Although it makes use of the name of Jesus Christ, Pro-Vida is considered incompatible with Christianity for completely abstracting the message of Christ, leading its followers to think in a way contrary to Christianity, such as by advocating pantheism, clairvoyance, levitation, psychometry, telepathy, and dowsing.
