= Hebraica-Rebouças (CPTM) =

Railway station in São Paulo, Brazil

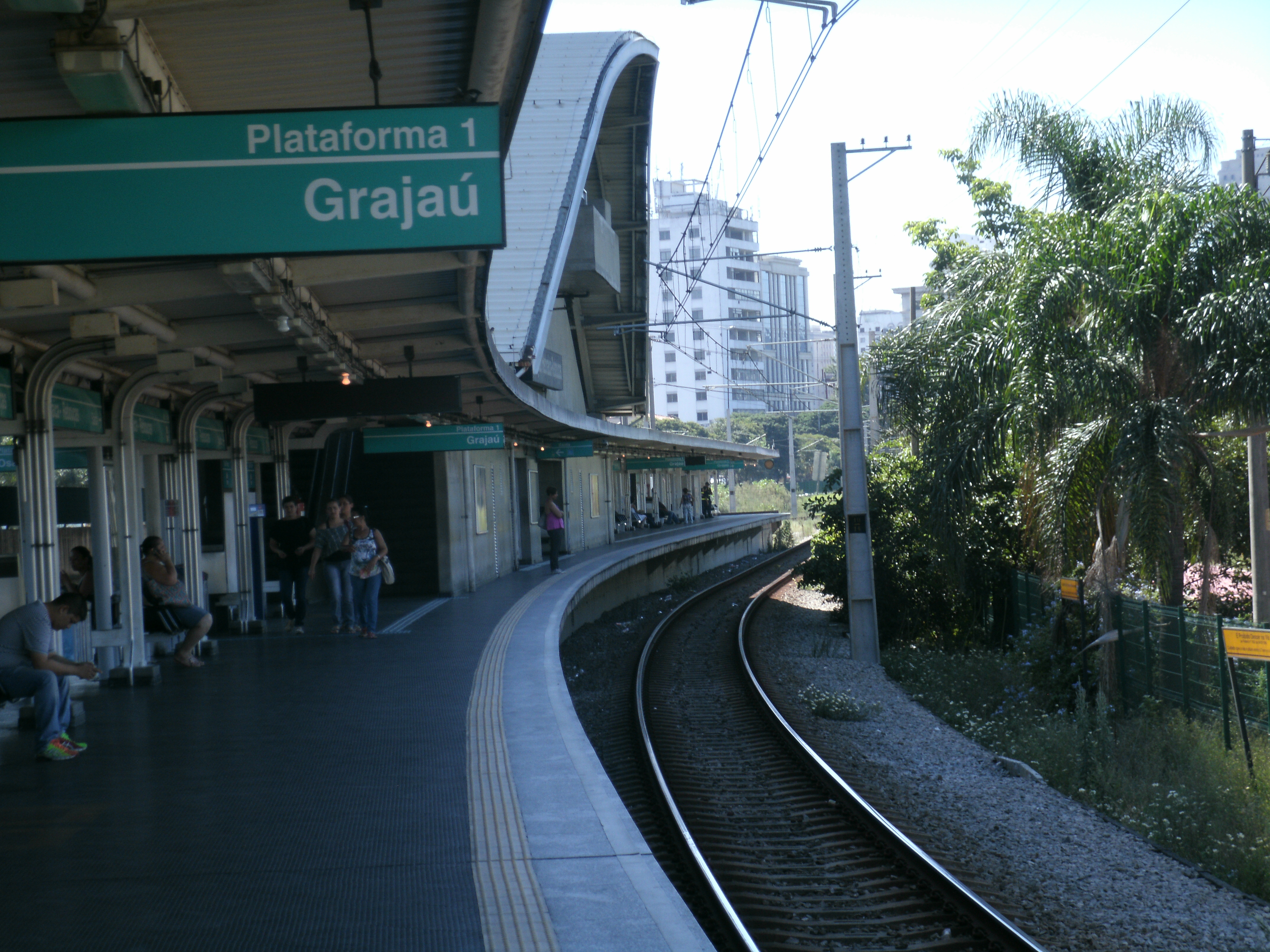

General information
- Location: R. Ofélia, 255; Pinheiros; Brazil
- Coordinates: 23.5736821°S 46.6985866°W
- Owner: Government of the State of São Paulo
- Operator: ViaMobilidade Linhas 8 e 9 (Motiva)
- Platforms: Island platform

Construction
- Structure type: At-grade
- Architect: Luiz Carlos Esteves

Other information
- Station code: HBR

History
- Opened: 14 June 2000; 26 years ago
- Former names: Eusébio Matoso

Services
| Preceding station | São Paulo Metropolitan Trains | Following station |
|---|---|---|
| Pinheiros towards Osasco | Line 9 | Cidade Jardim towards Varginha |
Track layout
Location

Hebraica-Rebouças is a train station on the ViaMobilidade Linhas 8 e 9 Line 9-Emerald, located in the district of Pinheiros in São Paulo. The station is conveniently located next to Eldorado Shopping Mall and the São Paulo A Hebraica club. It was built by CPTM and opened on 14 June 2000.
