= Eliana Tranchesi =

Brazilian businessperson (1955–2012)

- Born: Eliana Maria Piva de Albuquerque; November 24, 1955; São Paulo, Brazil
- Died: February 24, 2012 (aged 56); São Paulo, Brazil
- Occupation: Entrepreneur
- Known for: Owner of Daslu
- Spouse: Bernardino Tranchesi
- Children: 3

Eliana Maria Piva de Albuquerque Tranchesi (née Piva de Albuquerque; November 24, 1955 – February 24, 2012) was a Brazilian entrepreneur and owner of Daslu, a fashion house located in São Paulo that specialized in international brands. She brought to Brazilian stores the brands of Dolce & Gabbana, Giorgio Armani, Louis Vuitton, Christian Dior, Prada, Chanel, Burberry, Salvatore Ferragamo, Gucci, Fendi, Chloe, Cacharel, Yves Saint Laurent, Goyard, Tom Ford and Tod's.

Tranchesi began running Daslu in 2005, following the death of her mother (and the store's co-founder) Lúcia Piva. She eventually left the Vila Nova Conceição location and moving to a larger space on the exterior, renamed Villa Daslu.

== Prison ==
On July 13, 2005, the Brazilian Attorney General, the IRS and the Federal Police conducted "Operation Narcissus". Tranchesi was arrested along with her brother Antonio Carlos Piva de Albuquerque and several company officials and importers related to Daslu. However, she was released shortly after testifying.

In April 2008, federal prosecutors asked for Tranchesi's conviction along with six co-conspirators involved in the alleged scheme of fraudulent imports. On March 26, 2009, the Justice Department gave her the maximum sentence of 94.5 years in prison. The other six defendants were also convicted and all were charged with conspiracy, forgery and attempted embezzlement and consummated - lawful to import or export goods without the proper tax payments. Federal police arrested her in compliance with the court decision the same day, but the defense filed a writ of habeas corpus, and Tranchesi was released within about thirty-six hours, pending further appeal.

== Personal life and death ==
Eliana was married to doctor Bernardino Tranchesi with whom she had three children: Bernardino, Luciana and Marcella Tranchesi.

In 2006, Tranchesi revealed that she had a lung tumor removed that had metastasized in her spine and was undergoing chemotherapy and radiotherapy sessions. She died at dawn on February 24, 2012, in Albert Einstein Hospital in São Paulo, of complications from lung cancer.
