= Cidade Jardim (CPTM) =

Railway station in São Paulo, Brazil

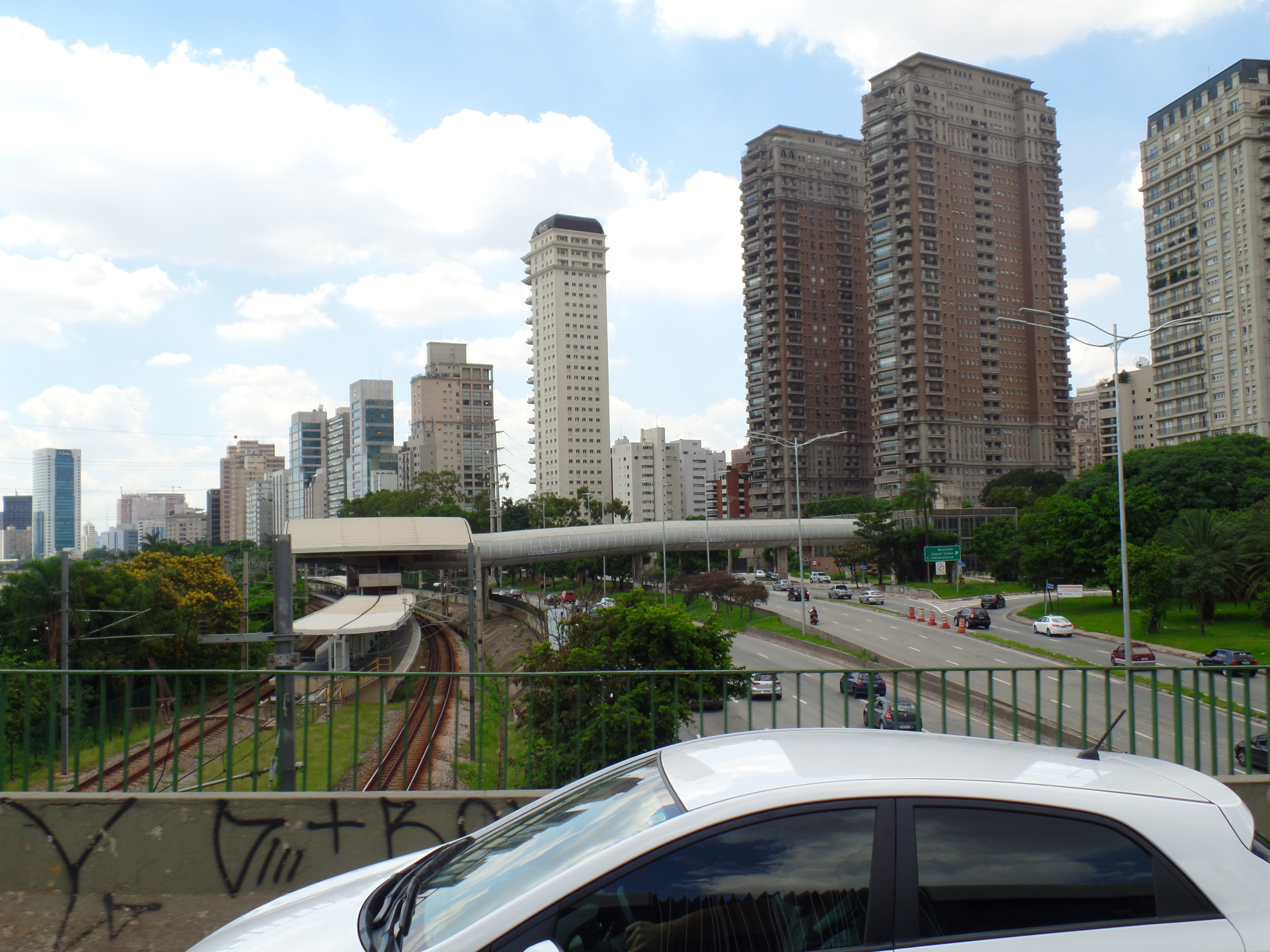

General information
- Location: R. Prof. Artur Ramos, 787; Pinheiros; Brazil
- Coordinates: 23.5853404°S 46.6910362°W
- Owner: Government of the State of São Paulo
- Operator: ViaMobilidade Linhas 8 e 9 (Motiva)
- Platforms: Island platform

Construction
- Structure type: At-grade
- Architect: Luiz Carlos Esteves

Other information
- Station code: CJD

History
- Opened: 3 June 2000; 26 years ago

Services
Preceding station	São Paulo Metropolitan Trains	Following station
Hebraica-Rebouças towards Osasco	Line 9	Vila Olímpia towards Varginha
Track layout
Location

Cidade Jardim is a train station on ViaMobilidade Linhas 8 e 9 Line 9-Emerald, located in the district of Pinheiros in São Paulo. It is next to São Paulo Jockey Club and Pinheiros Sport Club.

== History ==
The station was built by CPTM, during the "South Line Dinamization" and opened on 30 June 2000, being projected by architect Luiz Carlos Esteves in 1994.
