= Vila Madalena =

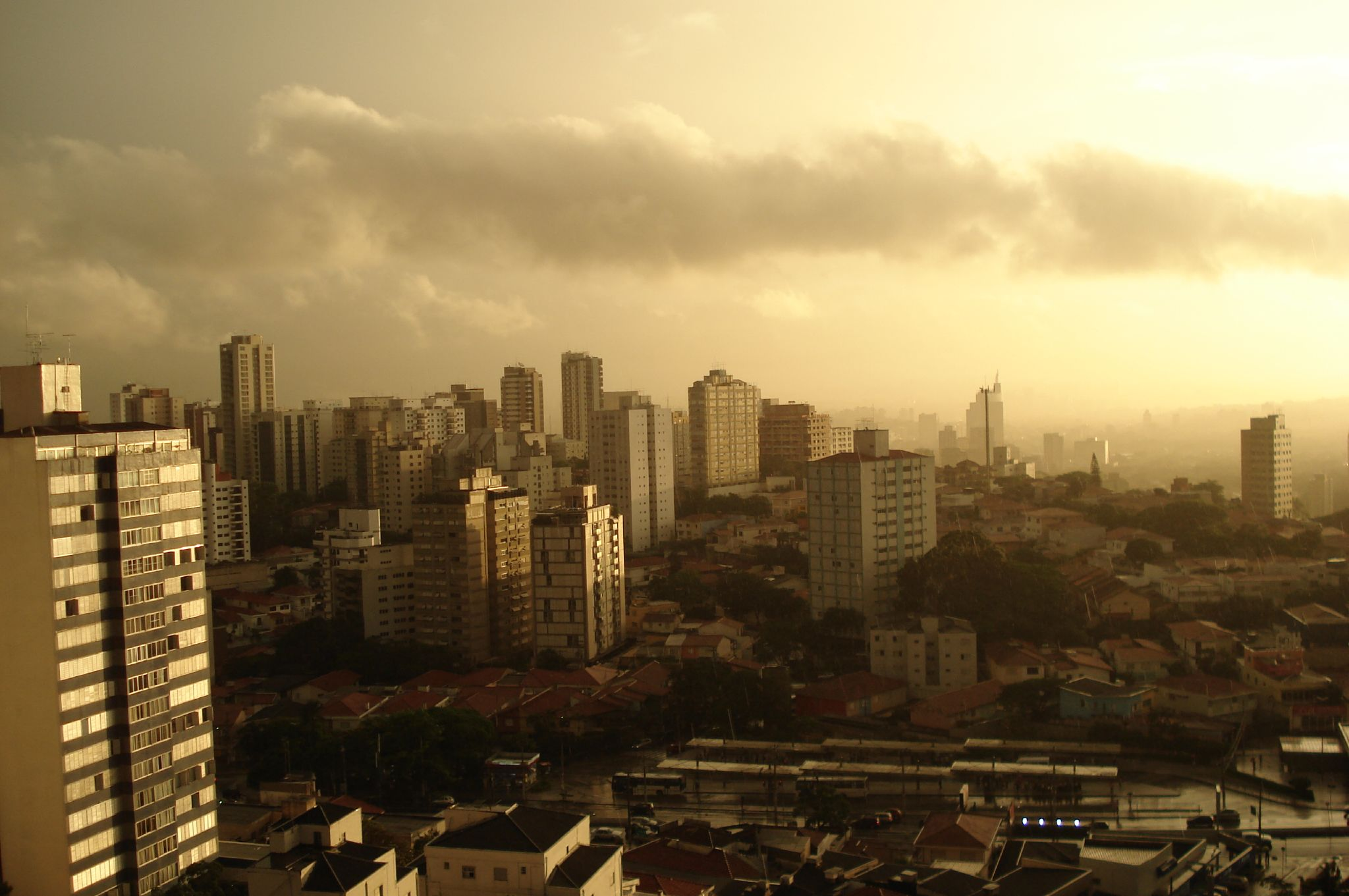
- View of the neighborhood after rain
- Interactive map of Vila Madalena
- Coordinates: 23.5525°S 46.691389°W
- Country: Brazil
- Region: Southeast
- State: São Paulo
- Municipality: São Paulo
- Administrative Zone: West
- Subprefecture: Pinheiros
- District: Pinheiros

Vila Madalena is an upper-middle-class neighborhood of the Pinheiros district in the West Zone of São Paulo, Brazil. The neighborhood is known for its bustling nightlife and its history as a center of São Paulo bohemian culture and art. The neighborhood is filled with dozens of art galleries and studios, an eclectic mix of restaurants and bars and a series of graffiti-covered streets and alleys. It is an attractive neighborhood for young professionals in the city.

This neighborhood is well-known for being a boêmio stronghold in the city of São Paulo, since the early 1970s, when students with little money started living there, due to its proximity to the University of São Paulo and the Pontifical Catholic University of São Paulo. There is a large concentration of bars and nightclubs there, as well as the Pérola Negra samba school. The name of the neighborhood was also used as the title of a soap opera on Rede Globo in the 1990s. Because of its reputation as a young and bohemian neighborhood and its proximity to the subway, several hostels have set up shop in the area.
