= Moema (district of São Paulo) =

District of São Paulo, Brazil

Coordinates: 23°35′32″S 46°39′56″W

- district of São Paulo
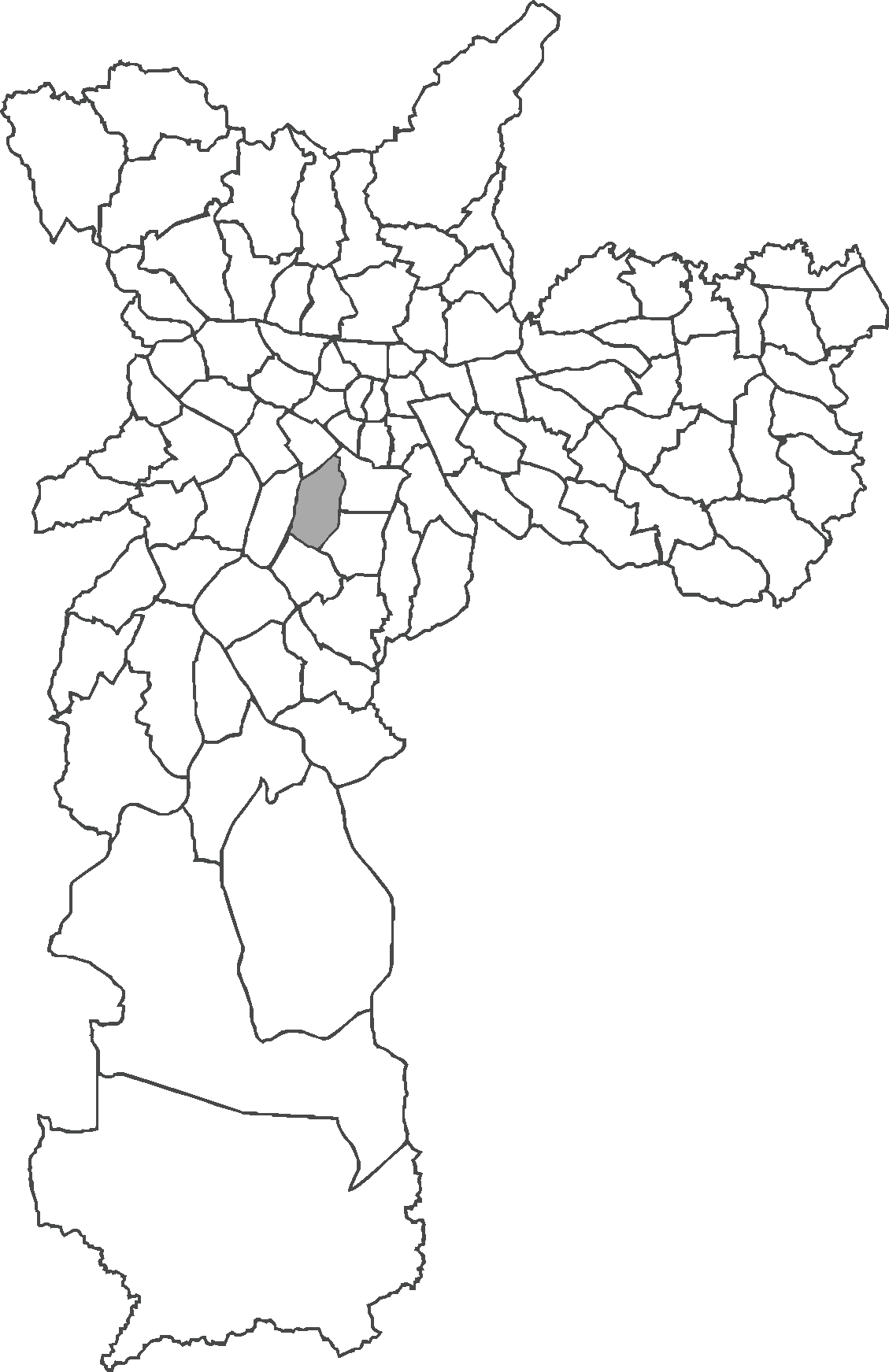
- Location of Moema in São Paulo

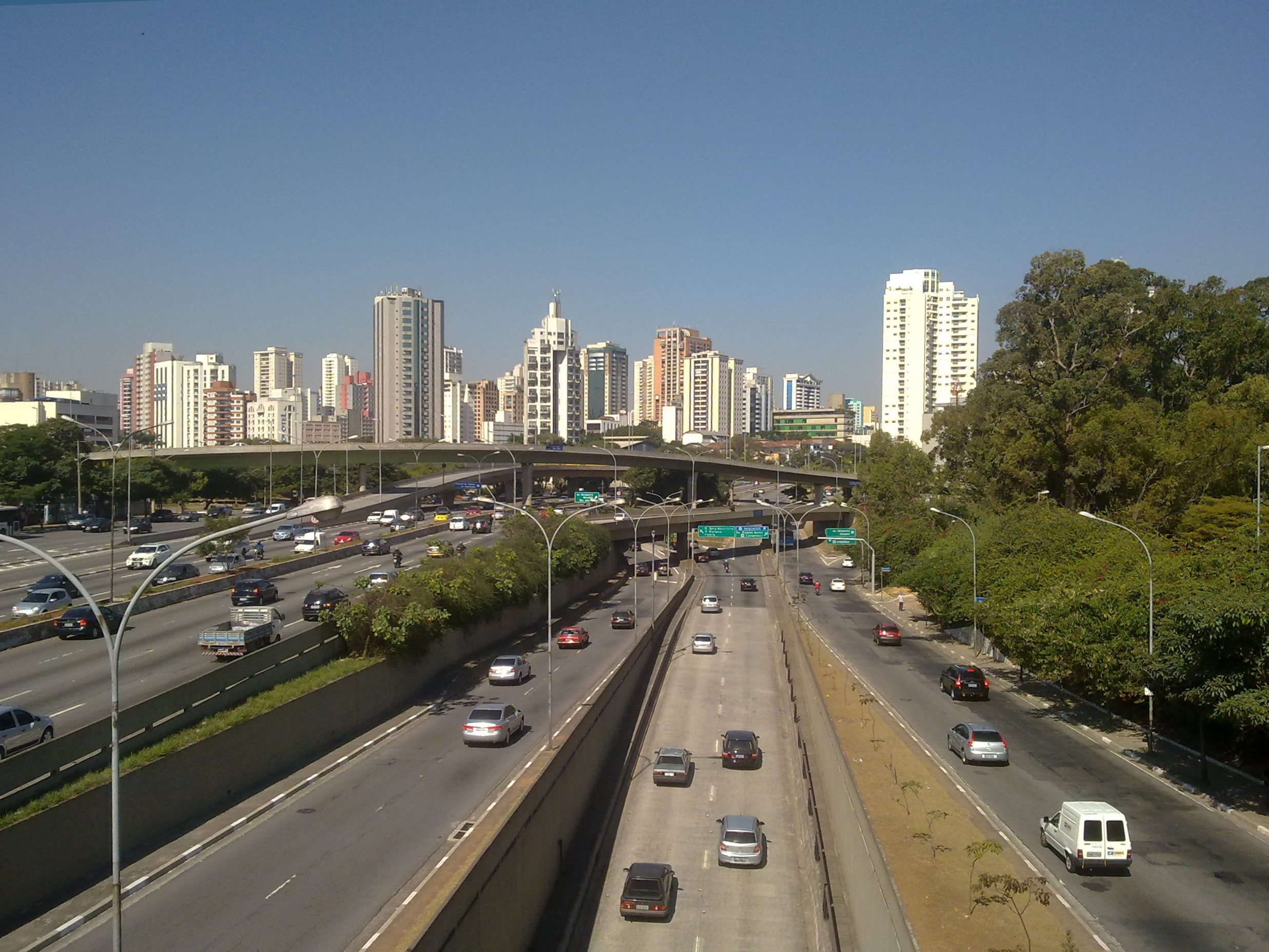
- Country: Brazil
- State: São Paulo
- City: São Paulo

Population (2004)
  - Total: 69,000
- HDI: 0.961 - very high

Moema is a district in the south region of the city of São Paulo. The name was first applied to the area in the early 20th century, when São Paulo expanded southward and began formalizing new residential districts.

== Toponym ==
The toponym "Moema" is a reference to the character, possibly fictional, of the poem Caramuru, by Santa Rita Durão, classic of the Brazilian arcade literature written in 1781. The character's name, in turn, corresponds to the Old Tupi language mo'ema, which means "lie" (in the poem, Moema was the lover rejected by the main character, Diogo Álvares, thus representing false love, as opposed to true love, represented by Diogo's wife, Catarina Paraguaçu).

== History ==
The area that became Moema was originally rural land with large farms in the late 19th and early 20th centuries and began to urbanize after it was subdivided for residential development in the early 1900s. Its development accelerated throughout the mid-20th century, driven by improved transportation infrastructure and its proximity to Ibirapuera Park, gradually shaping Moema into a predominantly residential neighborhood.

== Bordering districts ==
Moema is adjacent to the São Paulo neighborhoods of Vila Olímpia, Vila Nova Conceição, Brooklin, Indianópolis, and Campo Belo. The district is located in the South Zone of the city and is bounded by major thoroughfares such as Avenida Ibirapuera and Avenida dos Bandeirantes.

== Nearby Districts ==
Nearby districts include Vila Clementino, Jardim Lusitânia, and Planalto Paulista, which are located to the east and southeast of Moema and are connected to the district through local streets and shared urban infrastructure.
