= Pé de Fava =

- Alternative names: Saborear; São Jorge; Varandas (Note: According to the episode of Pesadelo na Cozinha, "Saborear" was the name on the facade, "Pé de Fava" was the name inside the restaurant, "São Jorge" was the name on the menu and "Varandas" was the name on the uniform and on the order form. After Érick Jacquin's renovation, only the name "Pé de Fava" was used.)

General information
- Type: Restaurant
- Location: Guarulhos, Brazil
- Coordinates: 23°28′23″S 46°33′15″W
- Inaugurated: 2016

Pé de Fava is a Brazilian restaurant serving Northeastern food founded by Fábio Lima in 2016 in the city of Guarulhos. It became better known after the premiere of the second season of Pesadelo na Cozinha, with chef Érick Jacquin, who talks about the restaurant. After the broadcast, several memes appeared on the Internet, especially due to the fact that the owner turned off the freezer at night. Fábio says he started receiving prank calls and death threats. In 2020, the restaurant was sold to the Lacerda family.

== Background ==
Fábio Lima was born in Viçosa, Alagoas. As a child, his father was a bricklayer and his mother was a maid. Fábio and Sâmia Lima, who would eventually become his wife, met when Sâmia was 14. They went to São Paulo to "try their luck". In the city, they lived in a small apartment for two years, and even slept in the kitchen. Eventually, however, they managed to get a low-income apartment in one of the largest favelas in Guarulhos, around 2004. There, Fábio got a job as a machine operator in a factory that made parts for the cosmetics industry, while Sâmia went to work in a bread factory. After a manager announced his retirement, Fábio saw the possibility of a promotion: "I worked from 7 am to midnight to get overtime. They even called me a sycophant. I started studying production engineering to try for the job."

However, Fábio was not promoted, and Sâmia became pregnant. He was fired under the pretext of restructuring the staff, and had to negotiate the continuation of his health insurance for another four months. Fábio and Sâmia were forced to resume their old dream of opening a restaurant, save money and return to the Northeast. However, Fábio and another partner from the Northeast ended up opening a snack bar in the São Rafael favela, in Guarulhos. Later, the same partner offered him the opportunity to open a larger restaurant, located on a busy avenue in the Jardim Tranquilidade neighborhood.

== Debut and early years ==
When the restaurant opened, a car pulled into the parking lot. The team — Fábio, Sâmia, and a cook — were anxious; however, the man wanted to take the tables away, since the tables had not been paid for when the owner changed hands, and they had to be negotiated. Fábio convinced the man to keep them, but he didn't know how to get the money. In the first few weeks, sales of à la carte dishes were not good. While riding the bus in the neighborhood, he saw a sign for a nearby restaurant that advertised all-you-can-eat food for R$11, and decided to make a better offer: all-you-can-eat food for R$9.90. And so, sales began to rise.

The fact that Fábio was used to operating machines helped to create "an atmosphere of open war", with shouting in front of customers, creating a chaotic routine. To help them, the "fix-it" Edilson Tenório came in. His exact role is unknown, however. Meanwhile, it was realized that Pé de Fava was not making a profit, and it was necessary to increase the price to 12 reais to make ends meet. In addition, it was necessary to buy a larger freezer. To do this, Fábio bought an old model from a used appliance store. However, it created ice sheets. In an attempt to solve the problem, they decided to turn off the freezer at night, so that they would be "ready until lunchtime". This would also reduce electricity costs.

== Impact caused by Pesadelo na Cozinha ==
Pesadelo na Cozinha is a Brazilian television program broadcast by Rede Bandeirantes based on the format of Ramsay's Kitchen Nightmares, from the United Kingdom. The program, hosted by Érick Jacquin, aims to revive restaurants that are going bankrupt. The Pé de Fava restaurant was the subject of the first episode of the second season of the program, broadcast on August 27, 2019. The Pesadelo na Cozinha team spent ten days providing consulting and training to employees and also arranged for the renovation of the property. During this period, Jacquin reported that interacting with Fábio "wasn't easy. He didn't see his own mistakes and thought the people around him were wrong." The most popular part of the episode is when Jacquin goes up to the second floor of the restaurant and discovers that Fábio's freezer is turned off. He also vomits at the smell of defrosting meat. The phrases uttered at the time, "You are the shame of the profession" ("Você é a vergonha da profissão") and "Turn off the freezer at night" ("Desliga o freezer à noite"), became Internet memes. Despite "going unnoticed" when broadcast on television, several memes began to emerge after the episode was broadcast on YouTube, increasing the popularity of Pesadelo na Cozinha.

By October 2019, the episode had already had three million views, "much more than the other episodes". Several newspapers published about the popularity and memes about the episode, some saying that it was one of the best memes of 2019 and others praising Jacquin as a meme. In response to the memes about the freezer, Fábio posted on his social media, on October 26, the situation of the appliance, and making it clear that he no longer turned off the freezer. The dolman that Jacquin wears in the episode inspired costumes at the 2020 carnival. "Pé de Fava" was rerun on February 9, 2021. In the premiere of the third season on March 30, Jacquin, when opening a freezer at the Mamma Júlia restaurant, says: "Do you have a friend in Guarulhos, who has a restaurant called Pé de Fava?"

This recording really left a mark on me because I never imagined that someone could turn off freezers at night to make money. It's a shame of the profession.

— Érick Jacquin about the Pé de Fava.

Fábio says that, right after the episode, the restaurant received negative repercussions. He complained that the program edited out the part that showed him helping homeless people. He also said that he received death threats and that his Facebook page was hacked, leading him to delete his photos with Jacquin. However, in the second week, several customers started to frequent the place, although Fábio complained that some "thought they were going to Jacquin's restaurant [...] my restaurant is simple [but] since I didn't meet their expectations, they came out cursing me." After Jacquin's renovation, he installed a barbecue grill and the price was increased to 15 reais, including a portion of barbecue. Regarding the freezer, he said that turning it off was just a one-off thing. He also said: "I've been getting a lot of calls on the restaurant's phone. People ask me if the freezer is on. When I answer, I join in the joke. I say: 'it's on now, but I'll turn it off tonight'. That's like a nickname. If you bother them, they'll get even more on your case."

== Changes and sale to the Lacerda family ==
Starting in March 2020, due to the COVID-19 pandemic, Fábio began to make changes. He, who did not have a delivery service, hired motorcycle couriers and joined apps such as iFood and Uber Eats. In May, several news reports emerged saying that Pé de Fava was being sold on OLX for 150 thousand reais. Fábio said that this was not for financial reasons, but simply because they wanted to return to their homeland, where it would be more peaceful.

In February 2021, it was reported that, after negotiations in 2020, the restaurant was sold to the Lacerda family, former owners of Lacerda Bistrô, which was closed amid the pandemic. The menu was replaced by a new one in January, designed by Arthur Pendragon, who participated in Mestre do Sabor. He took over the management of the establishment. According to the family, they want to deconstruct the image of the restaurant as shown on television.

We decided to invest in the business and reverse this image. This is a process that takes time, but we decided to pay the price. In the future, we will reevaluate and consider whether or not it is worth continuing with the brand. [...] People still have vivid memories of those episodes, but we are working to deconstruct the image of a restaurant that turned off its freezers and become known as a company that is fully responsible towards its customers, employees and suppliers and created using the techniques required by health authorities.

— Jaira Lacerda
