= Ibirapuera Park Conservancy =

Parque Ibirapuera Conservação
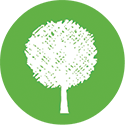
- Abbreviation: PIC
- Type: Nonprofit organization
- Purpose: To care for green public spaces
- Headquarters: São Paulo
- Location: Brazil
- Coordinates: 23.5831640883°S 46.6631725698°W
- Region served: Brazil
- Website: parqueibirapuera.org

Between 2014 and 2020, the Parque Ibirapuera Conservação was a nonprofit organization that identified, preserved and enhanced the natural, historical and cultural assets of Ibirapuera Park—the most visited park in the South America—and engaged local communities to care for others urban parks.

It was recognized as one of the largest urban park community organization in Brazil, the Parque Ibirapuera Conservação has provided aid to support Ibirapuera Park including the Reading Grove restoration, irrigation systems, research and conservation actions, volunteer engagement, and interpretive programs. The organisation worked was possible through the support of its members and donors, contributions from foundations, businesses, and individuals.

The organization follows the steps and the earlier governance model of Central Park Conservancy, when it also engaged the parks neighborhood into a local pioneering project to professionalize urban park stewardship through civil society, and to serve as model to other urban parks and public open spaces. As Parque Ibirapuera Conservação sought international management models for caring of public spaces, it also functioned as a local knowledge hub for urban parks in Brazil when provided assistance and guidance to parks friends groups.

In 2017, Ibirapuera Park entered into the municipal concession program, and the Parque Ibirapuera Conservação members are advocated for better governance and more transparency so that no matter what model the municipality adopted for its parks, the control should remain public.
