= Hélio Uchôa Cavalcanti =

Brazilian architect (1919–1971)

Hélio Uchôa Cavalcanti (1919–1971) was a Brazilian architect who contributed significantly to Brazilian national architecture and its modernist renewal. He collaborated with Oscar Niemeyer on projects like Rio de Janeiro's Lagoa Hospital and São Paulo's Ibirapuera Park, contributed to Brasilia's construction, and designed various residences and hotels globally.

Hélio Lage Uchôa Cavalcanti was born in Rio de Janeiro, Brazil on April 3, 1913 and graduated from the National School of Fine Arts in Rio de Janeiro in 1934. Throughout his career, he collaborated with prominent architects such as Affonso Eduardo Reidy and Oscar Niemeyer.

Some of Cavalcanti's notable projects include the Conjunto Residencial da Várzea do Carmo, the Duchen Factory, Palácio das Indústrias, Palácio das Nações, and Palácio dos Estados in Ibirapuera.

Cavalcanti died on January 22, 1971, in Rio de Janeiro, Brazil, at the age of 57.
