= Alto de Pinheiros =

District of São Paulo, Brazil

Coordinates: 23°32′57″S 46°42′51″W

- Neighborhood of São Paulo
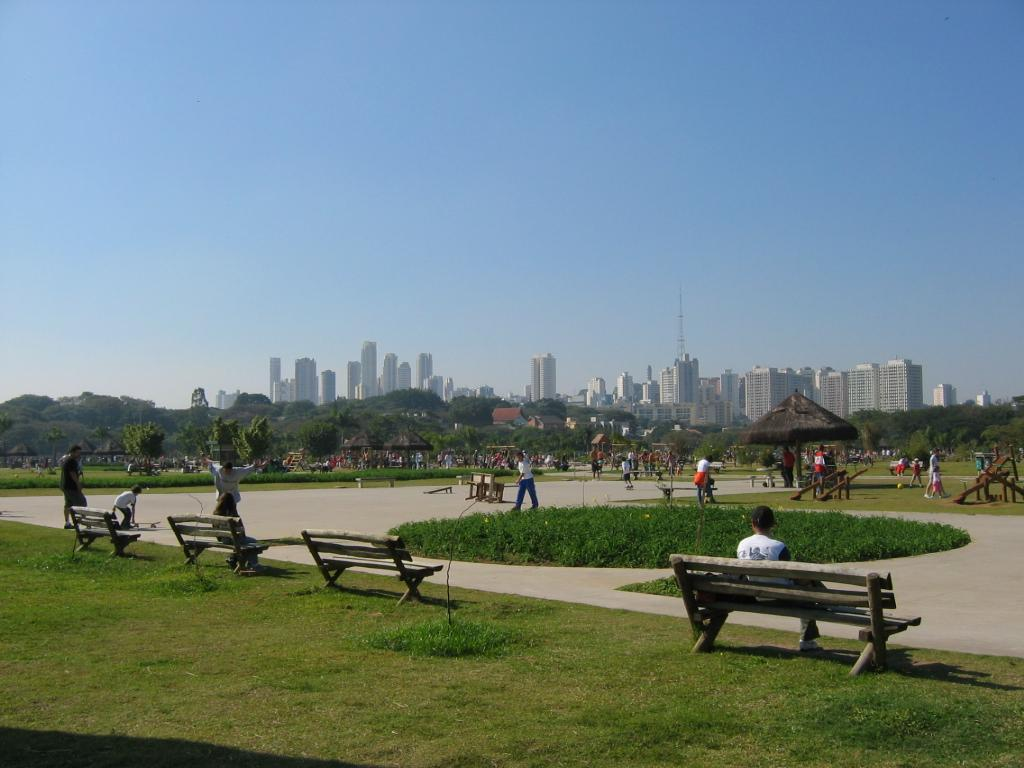
- Interactive map of Alto de Pinheiros
- Country: Brazil
- State: São Paulo
- City: São Paulo
- Subprefecture: Pinheiros

Government
  - Type: Subprefecture
  - Subprefect: Geraldo Mantovani

Area
  - Total: 32.06 km^{2} (12.38 sq mi)

Population (2022)
  - Total: 285,815
  - Density: 8,915/km^{2} (23,090/sq mi)

Alto de Pinheiros is a district in the subprefecture of Pinheiros of the West Zone of São Paulo, Brazil.
