= Daslu =

Department store in São Paulo, Brazil

Coordinates: 23°35′34″S 46°41′30″W

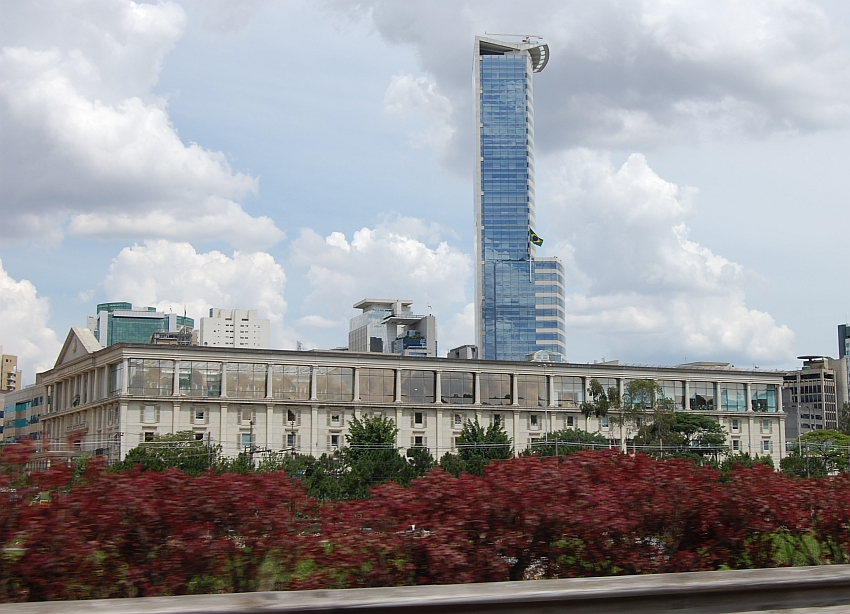
Daslu building

Daslu was an upmarket multi-brand boutique-department store in São Paulo, Brazil. The boutique is known as the "fashion designers' Mecca" of Brazil as it houses more than 60 labels plus 30 store-in-stores and is the place where Brazilian socialites, ranging from multi-millionaire soccer players to conglomerate bigwigs shop for the latest accessories and clothing. It is also a renowned shopping institution in South America for being a "purveyor" in chic and exclusive couture. The brand "Daslu" (conjunction of "from the Lu" in Portuguese) is a reference to the nickname "Lu" that was common to both partners who founded the store (Lúcia and Lourdes).

== History ==
The history of Daslu began in 1958 when it was opened by businesswomen and socialites Lúcia Piva de Albuquerque Tranchesi and Lourdes Aranha dos Santos, who sold clothes brought back from trips abroad. First operating out of Piva's home, the boutique catered to São Paulo's elites, and the owners donated a portion of profits to charity. Piva died in 1983, leaving the care of the business to her daughter, Eliana Tranchesi. In 1990, then-President Fernando Collor de Mello opened the country to imported goods, and Eliana was able to build exclusive partnerships with luxury brands such as Chanel, Jimmy Choo, Louis Vuitton and Valentino, transforming the boutique into the most luxurious department store in Brazil. As the business thrived and its offerings expanded, the store grew by purchasing adjacent properties, eventually connecting 23 houses into a large and unique shop floor.

By 2005, Daslu had outgrown even this, and moved into the four-story, 17,000 square-meter (183,000 square-foot) neoclassical Villa Daslu, in São Paulo's Vila Olimpia district. The Villa was so large and comprehensively luxurious that its offerings included a Maserati dealership, a rooftop helipad, and a consecrated loggia for full-service weddings. However, the year also saw Daslu raided by the government on charges of tax evasion. Prolonged legal troubles saw Daslu prohibited from importing merchandise for 13 months, and pushed the company into deep financial troubles. In 2011, nearing bankruptcy, the company sold itself to a Brazilian private equity fund for R$65 million. This included R$21 million in cash to recapitalize the business, erasure of R$44 million in debts to the fund, and assumption of debts to other creditors. Eliana Tranchesi was the sole stockholder of the company at the time, and received a symbolic R$1000 for her holdings, as well as franchise rights for a later Daslu store, pending the results of her appeal. It took over six months to untangle Daslu's financial affairs, but the Villa sold to Iguatemi S.A. and a new store opened at the Shopping Cidade Jardim.

Eliana Tranchesi died of lung cancer in São Paulo, on February 24, 2012. She was 55 years old.

In October 2016, the JK Igautemi shopping center secured a court judgment evicting Daslo for R$3 million in owed rent. The newspaper O Estado de S. Paulo found that the store faced other debts totaling over R$100 million and was having trouble paying employee salaries. Daslu closed its Ribeirão Preto location the following month, leaving the Cidade Jardim location and one other in Rio de Janeiro.

After the company closed its remaining stores, Mitre Realty, a São Paulo-based real estate developer, purchased the Daslu brand at auction in June 2022.

== Social criticism ==
Both the flagship store and the brand itself attracted significant controversy. The opulent Villa Daslu was located directly between a freeway and Coliseu, one of the city's many favelas or shanty-towns. Days before the store's opening in 2005, a Brazilian government study reported that the country's wealth disparity was the second-largest in the world, behind only Sierra Leone. Customers at the opening drank 2,680 bottles of complimentary Veuve Clicquot champagne, and within weeks, students protested at the Villa's gates, begging entering customers for money. In response, Eliana Tranchesi claimed that Daslu was "doing [its] part by providing jobs to Brazilians and paying taxes," as well as providing free day care and basic schooling for the children of all of its employees. That year, Daslu also established a project in partnership with CUFA to offer workshops, education, and sports activities in nearby favelas.

== Tax evasion ==
Despite its claims of paying taxes, Daslu fell under criminal investigation for tax evasion and filing of fraudulent import documents. In July 2005, a month after the Villa Daslu opened, more than 300 federal police and tax agents raided the store and its offices in four Brazilian states. The government claimed that the company had used shell companies abroad to produce fake invoices and underreport the value of its imports. Eliana herself was arrested at her home and later released. On December 13, 2006, Daslu was fined approximately US$112 million (BRL$236 million) for a tax evasion scheme dating back to the year 2000.

On March 26, 2009, Eliana, her brother Antônio Carlos Piva de Albuquerque, and five co-conspirators were convicted of smuggling, organized crime, and tax evasion. Eliana and Antônio were sentenced to 94 years and 6 months in prison, while their import agents and accountant were sentenced to terms between 11 and 53 years. All seven people involved were released roughly 36 hours later, pending appeal, after filing writs of habeas corpus. Tranchesi's lawyer argued that the sentence was excessive, with most comparable crimes earning terms of less than four years, and some supporters believed that the charges were inflated to distract from corruption scandals in the Brazilian government.
