= Ibirapuera Park =

Urban park in São Paulo

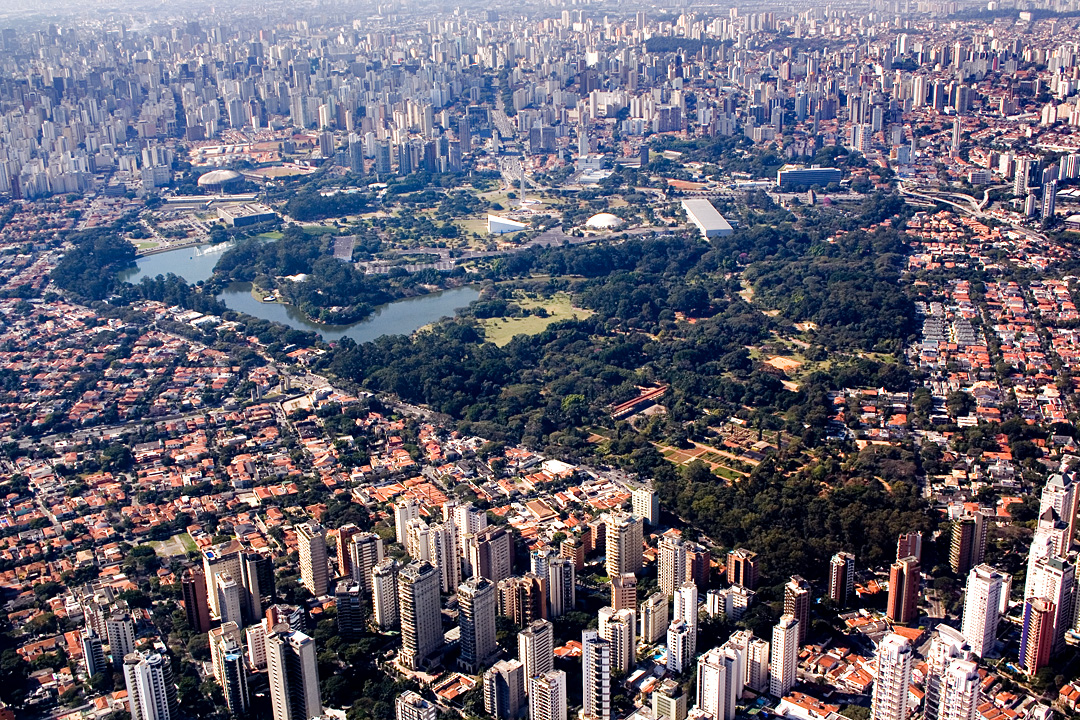
- Ibirapuera Park

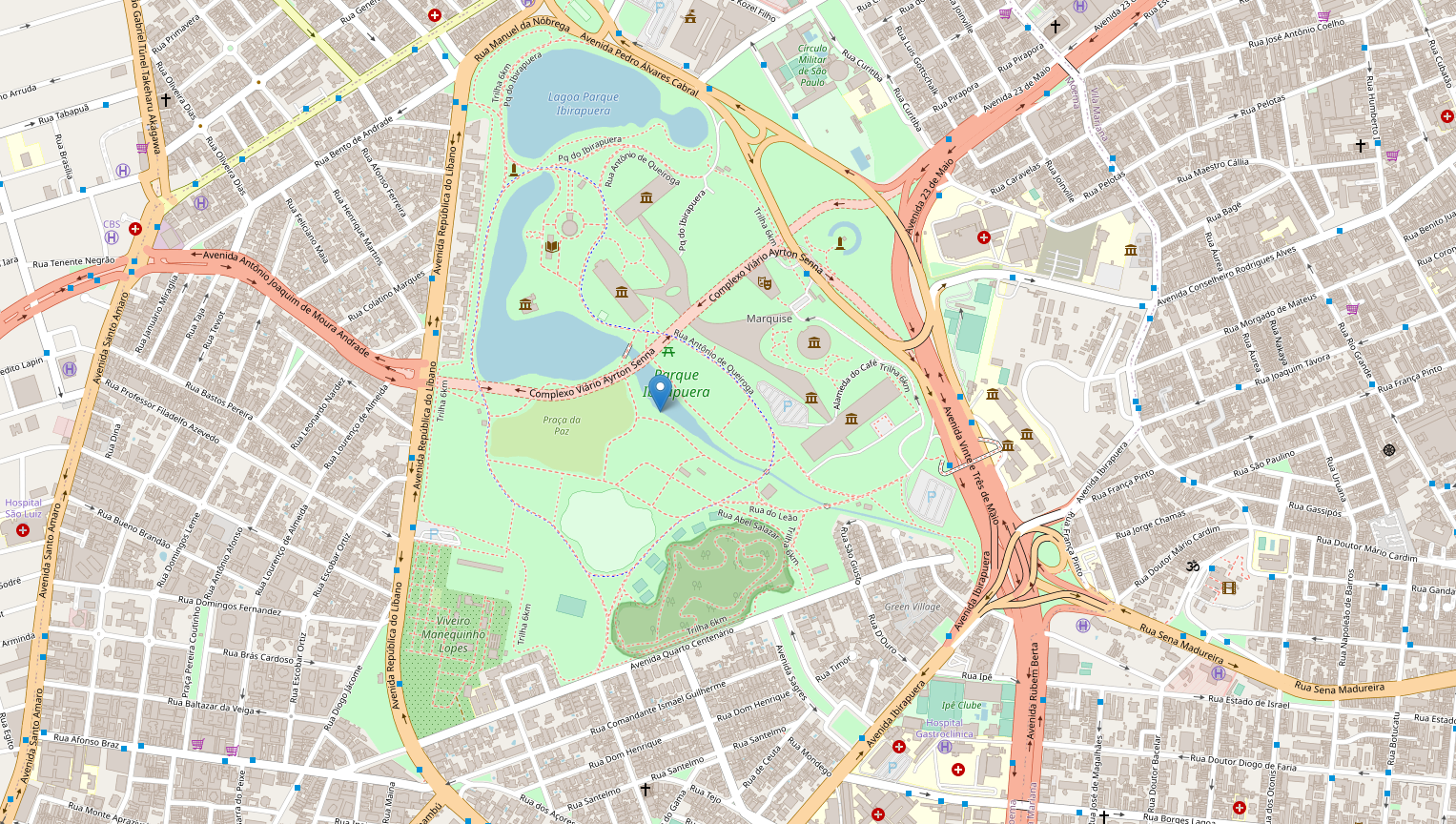
- Type: Urban park
- Location: São Paulo, Brazil
- Coordinates: 23°35′18″S 46°39′32″W
- Area: 158 hectares (390 acres; 0.61 mi^{2}; 1.58 km^{2})
- Created: 1954
- Owner: São Paulo Department of Parks and Green Areas
- Operator: Urbia Parques
- Visitors: More than 18 million annually
- Open: 5:00 a.m. to 11:00 p.m.
- Public transit: AACD-Servidor
- Website: parqueibirapuera.org

Ibirapuera Park (Portuguese: Parque Ibirapuera) is an urban park in São Paulo. It comprises 158 hectares (approx. 390 acres) between Av. República do Líbano, Av. Pedro Alvares Cabral, and Av. IV Centenário, and is the most visited park in South America, with 14.4 million visits in 2017.

Ibirapuera Park was the first metropolitan park in São Paulo, designed along the lines of other great English landscape gardens built in the 20th century in major cities around the globe, but inspired on modern drafts from the landscape architect Roberto Burle Marx. It was inaugurated on 21 August 1954 for the 400th anniversary of the city of São Paulo with buildings designed by architect João Felipe Pereira and landscape by agronomist Otávio Augusto Teixeira Mendes. The construction of several pavilions in the park was controversial when the park was designed, and group of people advocated for an exclusively green park rather than one that included buildings. In the 90s, its green areas were graded heritage-listed status by the city and the state of São Paulo to avoid further construction and keep its historical gardens and green open spaces preserved. In 2016, the complex of buildings designed by Oscar Niemeyer, alongside Zenon Lotufo, Hélio Uchôa Cavalcanti, and others, in the park were also registered as national landmark by the National Historic and Artistic Heritage Institute.

Ibirapuera is one of Latin America's largest urban parks, together with Chapultepec Park in Mexico City and Simón Bolívar Park in Bogotá, and its iconic importance to São Paulo is often internationally comparable to that of Central Park in New York City. The park is often cited as one of the most vibrant and photographed parks in the world, as together with its large area for leisure, jogging and walking, it hosts a vivid cultural scene with museums, a music hall, and popular events such as São Paulo Fashion Week, congresses and trade shows. It is claimed to be the most visited urban park in South America, is listed as one of the best parks in the world, and has been described as "a green oasis at the heart of a concrete jungle".

The park has been managed for decades by the city of São Paulo, but the local government plans to concession all its parks' management to private hands, starting with Ibirapuera Park. Since 2014, the park also has the support of the Ibirapuera Park Conservancy (Parque Ibirapuera Conservação), a strong community nonprofit that supports park stewardship and conservation actions through a capital improvement plan, engagement projects and volunteer work. Admission to the park has been free since 1954, and it is open from 5am until midnight every day.

== See also ==
- Ginásio do Ibirapuera
- Estádio Ícaro de Castro Melo
- São Paulo Biennial Foundation
- Hélio Uchôa Cavalcanti
- Burle Marx Park
