= Parque Ibirapuera Conservação =

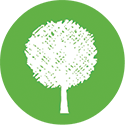
- Abbreviation: PIC
- Type: Nonprofit organization
- Purpose: To care for green public spaces
- Headquarters: São Paulo
- Coordinates: 23.5831640883°S 46.6631725698°W
- Region served: Brazil
- Website: parqueibirapuera.org

The Parque Ibirapuera Conservação (PIC) was a nonprofit organization that identified, preserved and enhanced the natural, historical and cultural assets of Ibirapuera Park in São Paulo, Brazil between 2014-20. It also assisted other Brazilian local communities to care for their local urban parks. The organization provided aid to support Ibirapuera Park through restoration and volunteer work by its members and donors, contributions from Park-area residents, corporations and foundations.

== History ==
In late 2010, a few determined members of Ibirapuera Park Management Council did not seem satisfied with municipality lack of capital to restore and care for the park, and started to seek donations and private support to foster CAPEX projects. By 2014, Parque Ibirapuera Conservação was founded following the steps' of Central Park Conservancy to function as a private partner at engaging its neighborhood into a local and pioneering project to professionalize stewardship through civil society.

PIC major works in Ibirapuera Park included the Reading Grove restoration, upgraded a part of its irrigation system, research and conservation actions, volunteer engagement, and created interpretive programs.

== Parks Concession ==
In 2017, the city of São Paulo announced that Ibirapuera Park would be part of a large municipal concession program, as Parque Ibirapuera Conservação initiatives had become a key piece of urban parks' transformation, and raised public and political interest to delegate the entire parks management into private hands. The concession took longer that the municipality envisaged, and PIC battle for an update master plan for the park. It argued that no matter what model the municipality chose to adopt to manage its parks, the control should remain public.
