= Jardins =

- São Paulo region
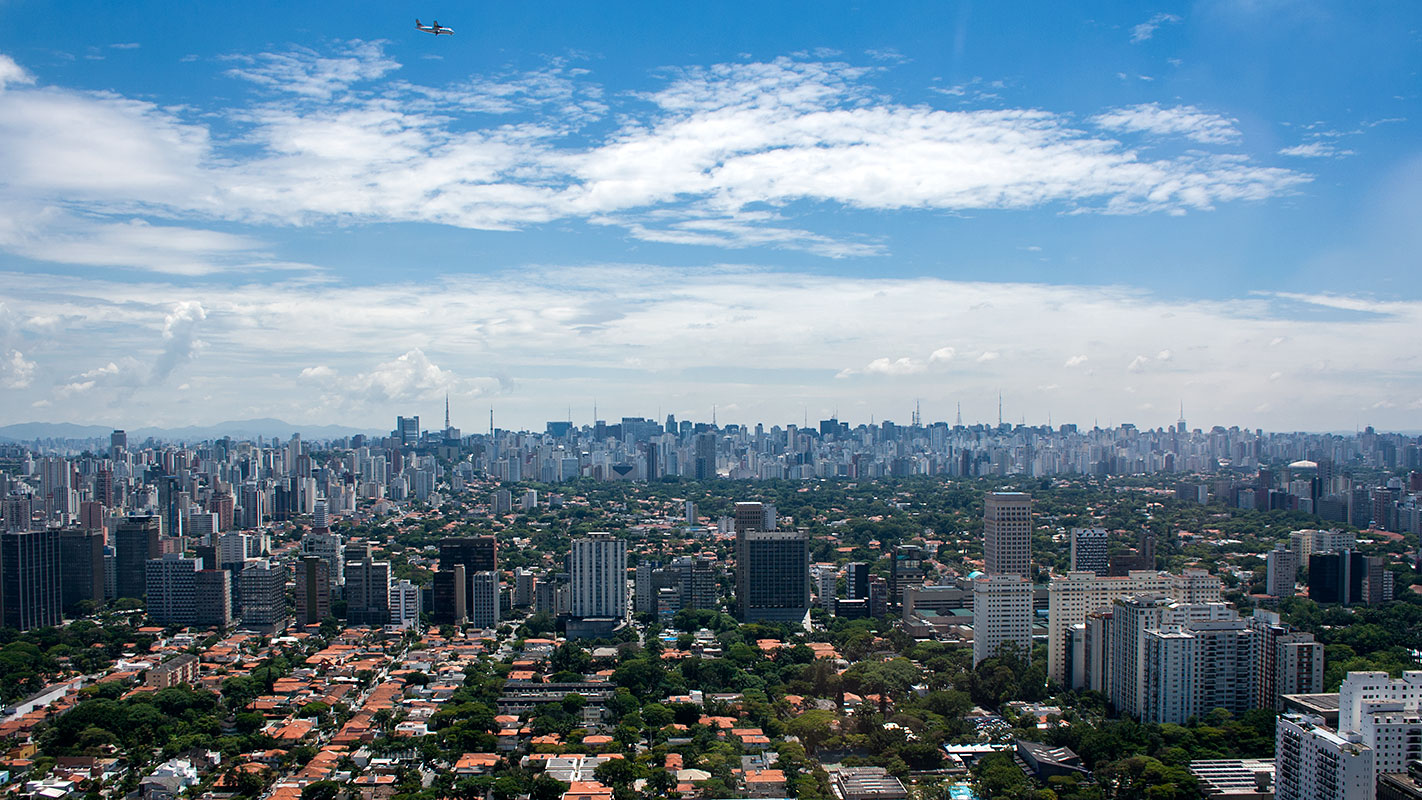
- Jardins region view from above

- Location within São Paulo Location within Brazil
- Coordinates: 23°34′21″S 46°40′45″W
- Country: Brazil
- Region: Southeast
- State: São Paulo
- Municipality: São Paulo
- Administrative Zone: West
- Subprefecture: Pinheiros
- District: Jardim Paulista

Jardins (Portuguese for Gardens) is the name given to an upper-class region of São Paulo city, which includes the neighbourhoods all comprised within the Subprefecture of Pinheiros:

- Jardim Paulista - in the Jardim Paulista district
- Jardim América - in the Jardim Paulista district
- Jardim Europa - in the Pinheiros district
- Jardim Paulistano - in the Pinheiros district

Additionally, certain sections of Cerqueira César, located in the south area of Avenida Paulista are also considered as an integral part of the Jardins region.

Jardins is limited by the following roads: Rebouças Avenue, River Pinheiros Marginal Avenue, Brigadeiro Luís Antônio Avenue and Paulista Avenue. It is considered one of the noblest areas of São Paulo.

Jardins is home to many museums, such as the São Paulo Museum of Image and Sound, the Ema Gordon Klabin Cultural Foundation, the Museum of the Brazilian House and the Brazilian Museum of Sculpture.

== Gallery ==
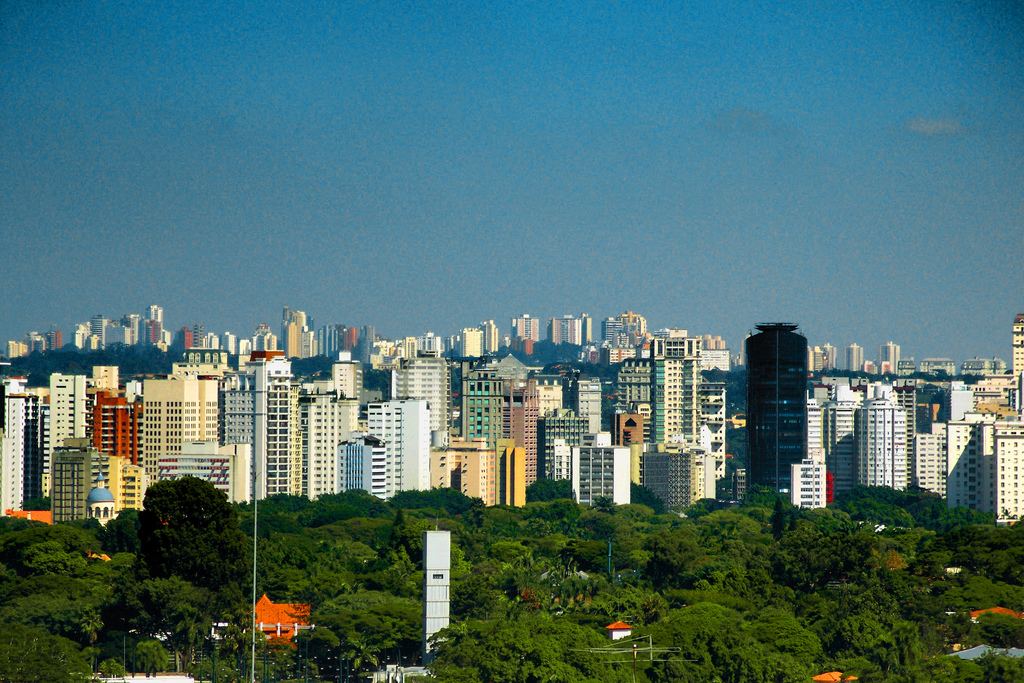
Jardim Paulistano

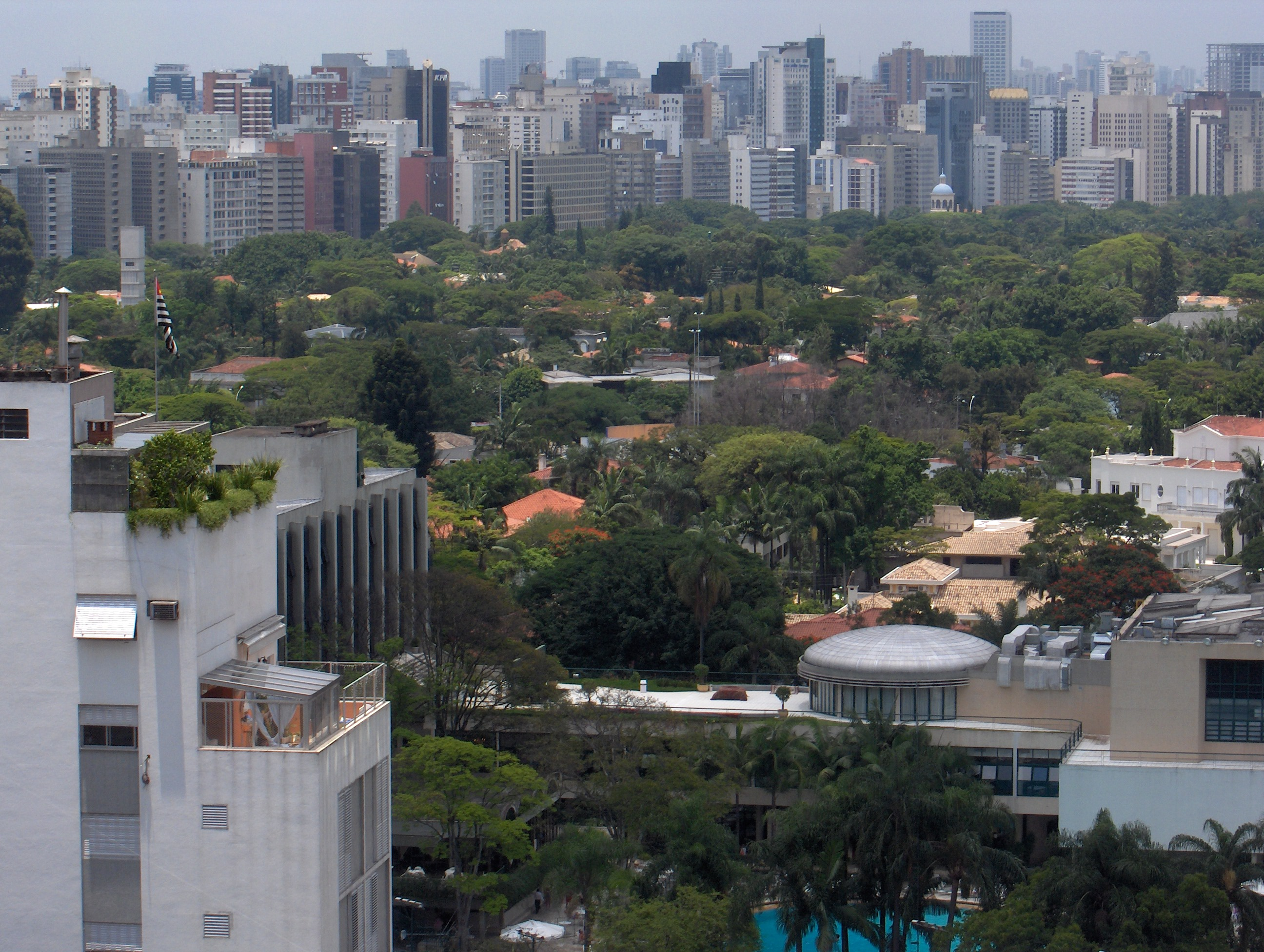
Jardim Europa

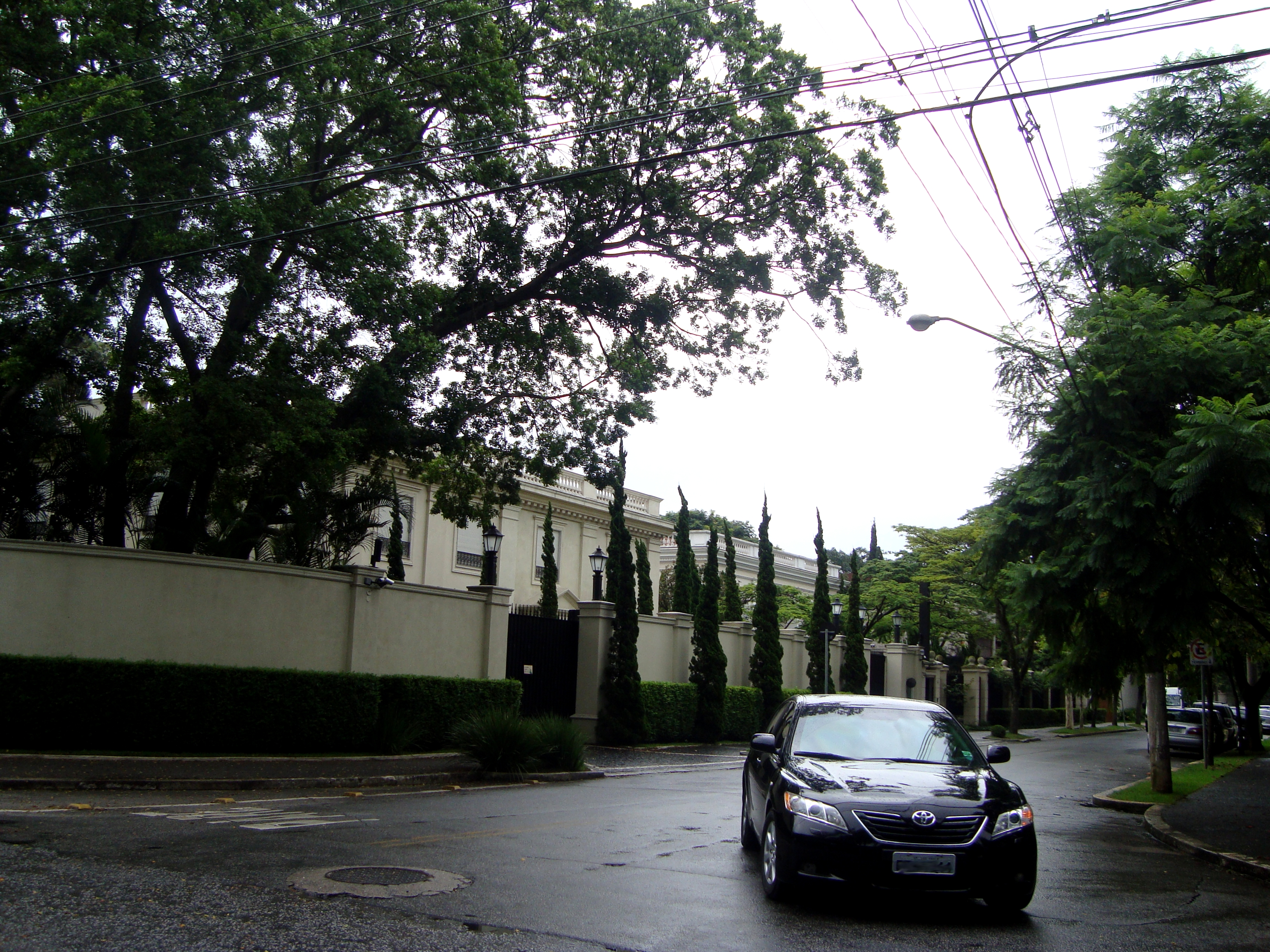
Jardim America

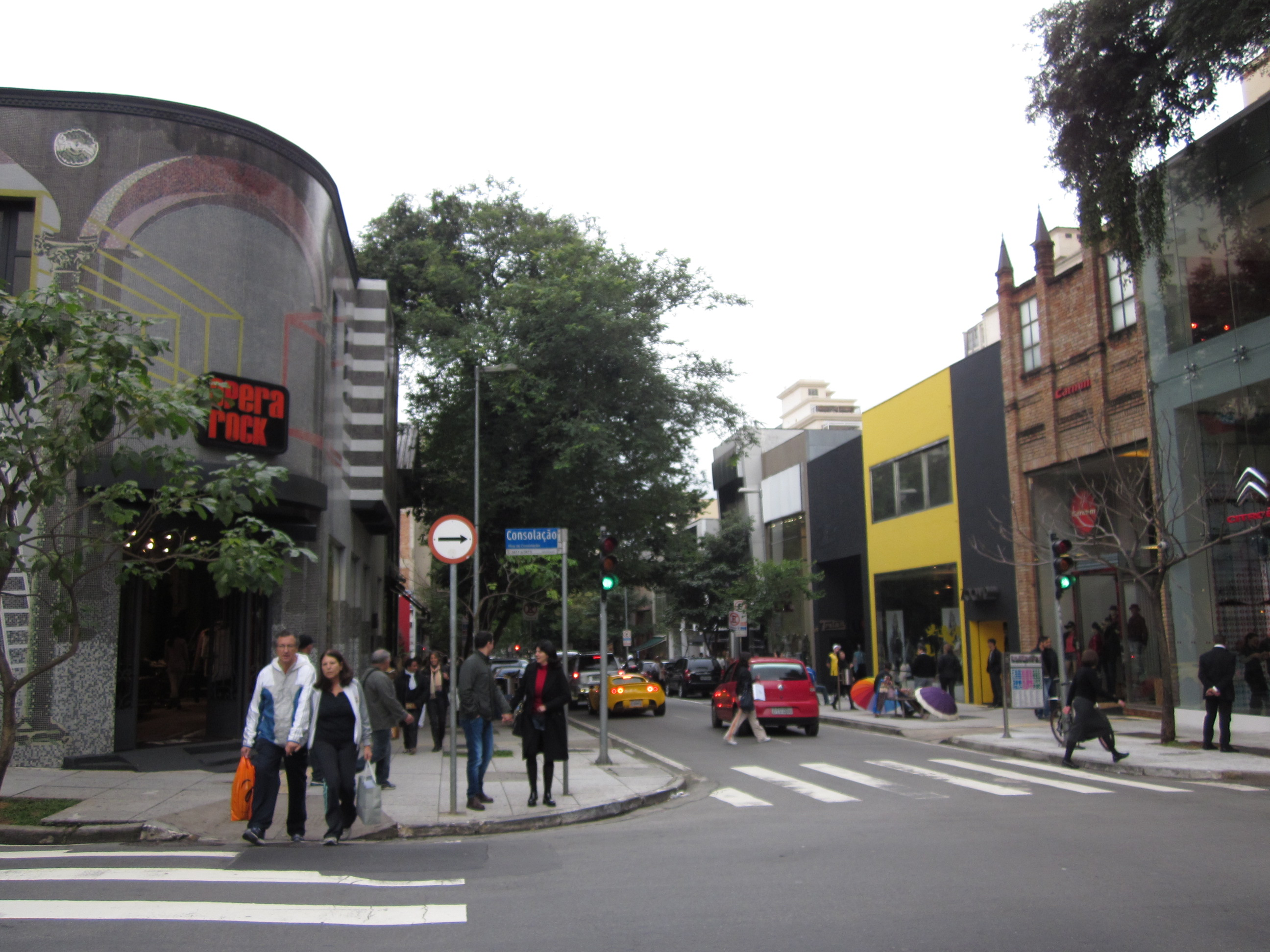
Oscar Freire Street
