= Subprefecture of Pinheiros =

Coordinates: 23°33′08″S 46°31′04″W

- Subprefecture
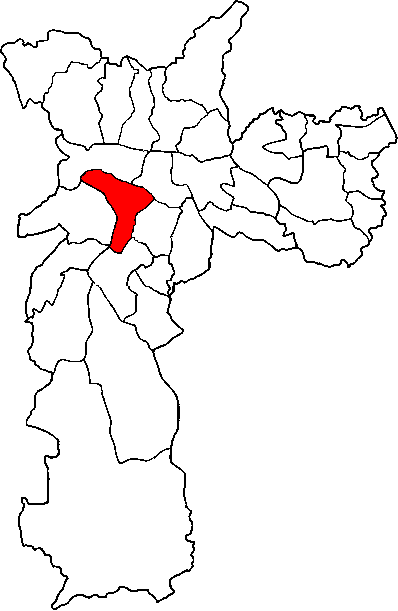
- Location of the Subprefecture of Pinheiros in São Paulo

- Location of municipality of São Paulo within the State of São Paulo
- Country: Brazil
- Region: Southeast
- State: São Paulo
- Municipality: São Paulo
- Administrative Zone: West
- Districts: Pinheiros, Alto de Pinheiros, Itaim Bibi, Jardim Paulista

Government
  - Type: Subprefecture
  - Subprefect: Geraldo Mantovani

Area
  - Total: 32.06 km^{2} (12.38 sq mi)

Population (2008)
  - Total: 233,563
- HDI: 0.956 – very high
- Website: Subprefeitura Pinheiros (Portuguese)

The Subprefecture of Pinheiros is one of 32 subprefectures of the city of São Paulo, Brazil. It comprises four districts: Pinheiros, Alto de Pinheiros, Itaim Bibi, and Jardim Paulista.

Pinheiros is the most affluent of the subprefectures. It comprises two of the five financial districts of the city, including Paulista Avenue and many of the most important museums of the city. It has also the neighbourhoods of Vila Madalena and Vila Olímpia, famous for its nightlife and dance clubs, and most (though not all) of the upper-class residential neighbourhoods. It is the headquarters of many Brazilian companies such as AmBev, Vivo, Rede Globo (along with Rio de Janeiro), and Grupo Pão de Açúcar, as well as the Brazilian headquarters of many multinational companies, including Google, Microsoft, Apple, Yahoo!, Santander, Ernst & Young, Unilever, Nextel and Bunge.
