= Itaim Bibi =

District of São Paulo, Brazil

Coordinates: 23°36′00″S 46°41′06″W

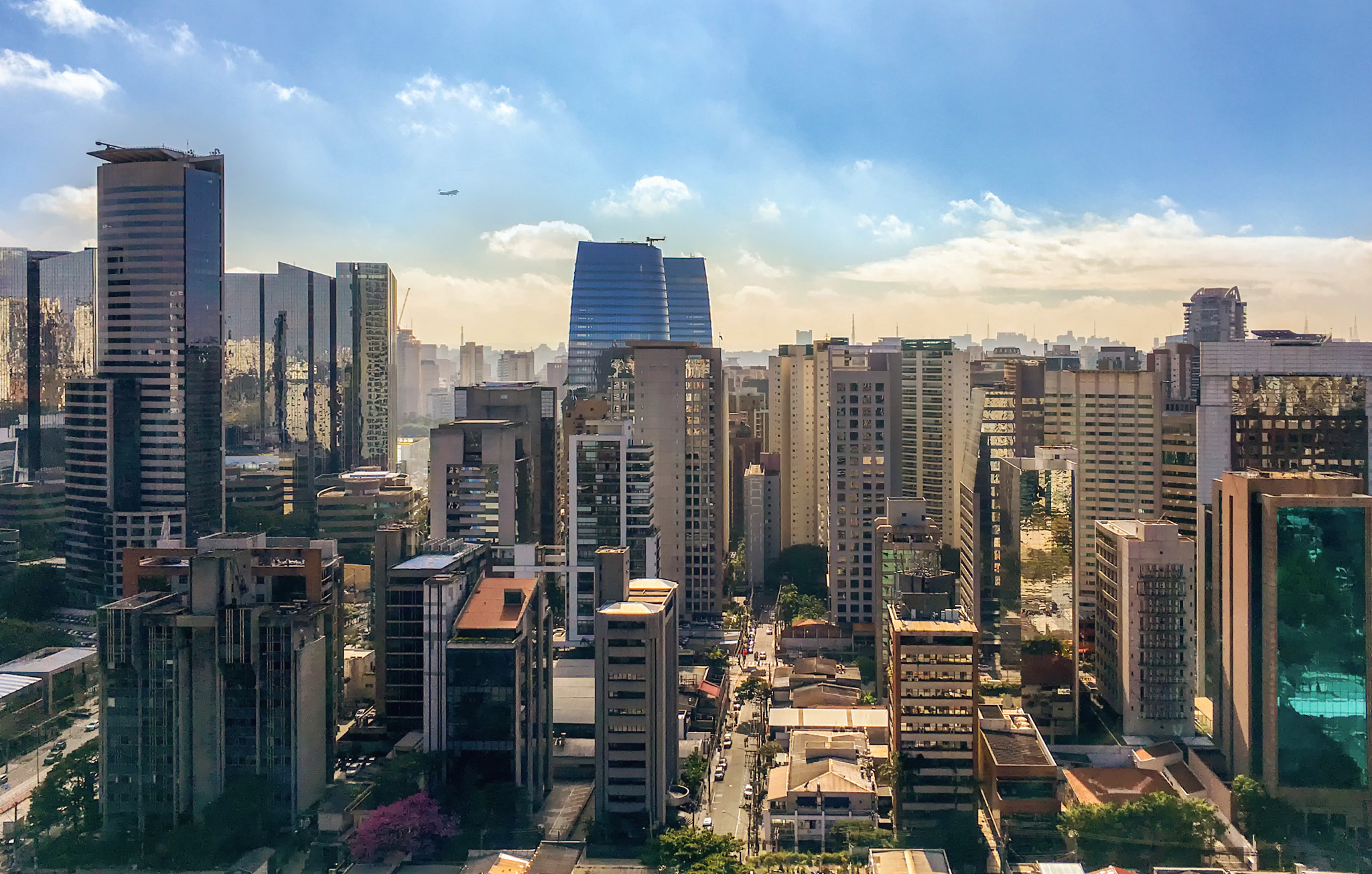

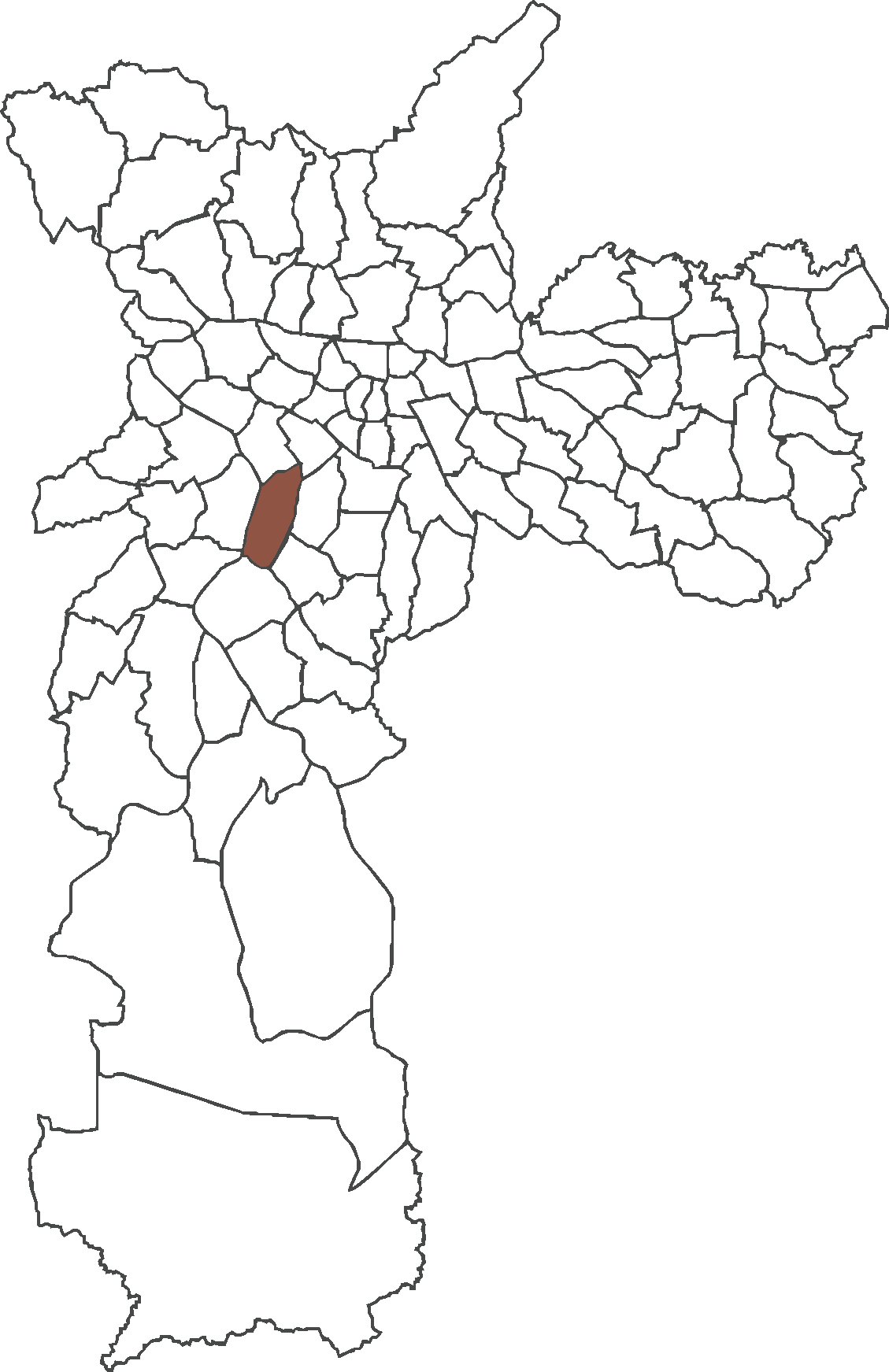
- Location in the city of São Paulo
- Country: Brazil
- State: São Paulo
- City: São Paulo

Government
  - Type: Subprefecture
  - Subprefect: Sérgio Teixeira Alves

Area
  - Total: 9.9 km^{2} (3.8 sq mi)

Population (2000)
  - Total: 44.454
  - Density: 8.228/km^{2} (21.31/sq mi)
- HDI: 0.953 –very high
- Website: Subprefecture of Pinheiros

Itaim Bibi is a district in the subprefecture of Pinheiros in the city of São Paulo, Brazil. It includes in its area an eponymous neighborhood.

Popularly and in some reports, the region once belonged to the South Zone, but is administered by the Pinheiros Subprefecture, being officially integrated into the West Zone. The administrative change occurred in 2002, under the Marta Suplicy administration; until then, it was part of the South-Central Zone (South Zone), being administered by the Santo Amaro Subprefecture.

Google São Paulo has its offices in the area.

== History ==
The District of Peace of Itaim was established by virtue of State Decree No. 6731 of October 4, 1934.
