= Pinheiros =

District of São Paulo, Brazil

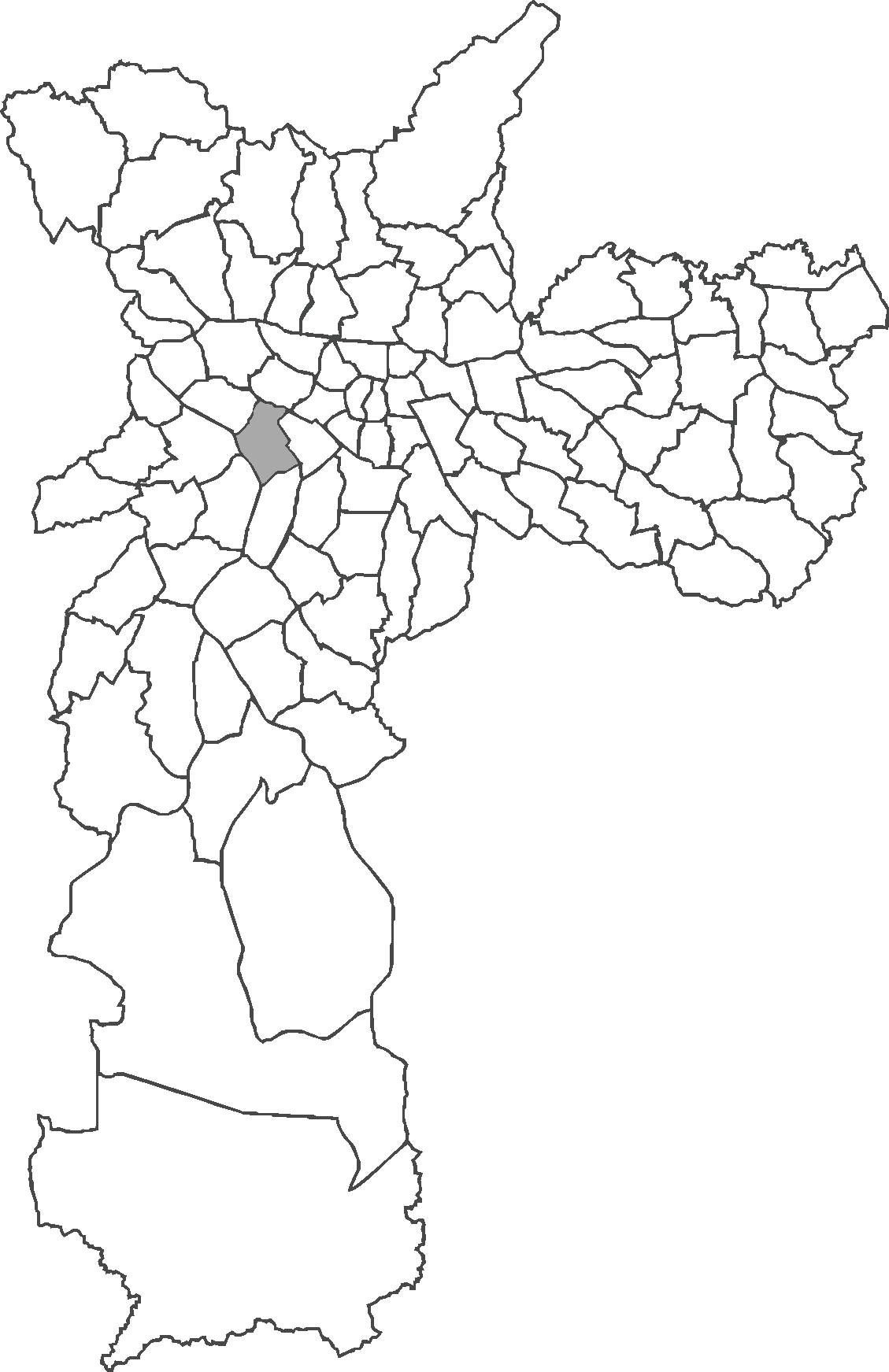
- Location in the city of São Paulo

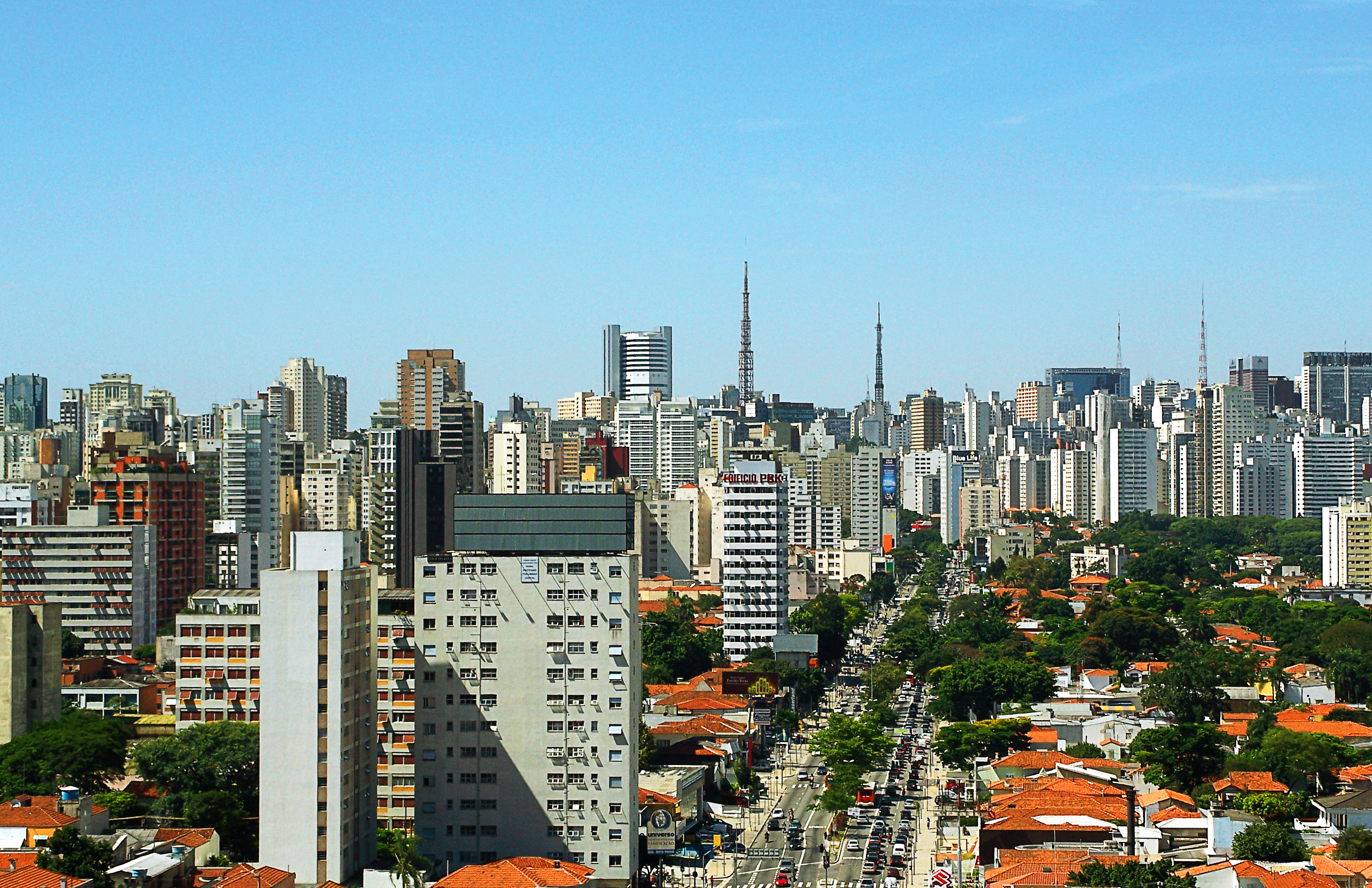
- View of Pinheiros and Rebouças Avenue
- Country: Brazil
- State: São Paulo
- City: São Paulo

Government
  - Type: Subprefecture
  - Subprefect: Coronel Bucheroni

Area
  - Total: 8 km^{2} (3.1 sq mi)

Population (2000)
  - Total: 62.997
  - Density: 7.875/km^{2} (20.40/sq mi)
- HDI: 0.960 – very high
- Website: Subprefecture of Pinheiros

Pinheiros (Portuguese pronunciation: [pĩˈɲejɾus], "pine trees") is a district in the subprefecture of the same name in the city of São Paulo, Brazil. Prior to development, the land which this borough occupies was dominated by the dense forest which contained a Brazilian subtropical species of pine, Araucaria angustifolia, which is also the symbol of the Paraná state.

The district comprises the neighborhoods of Jardim das Bandeiras, Jardim Viana, Jardim das Rosas, Pinheiros, Vila Madalena, Sumarezinho, Jardim Europa, and Jardim Paulistano, the last two being part of the Jardins upper class region. The HDI of the borough was 0.960, the second highest in the city of São Paulo.
