= West Zone of São Paulo =

Coordinates: 23°34′19″S 46°42′03″W

West Zone of São Paulo Zona Oeste
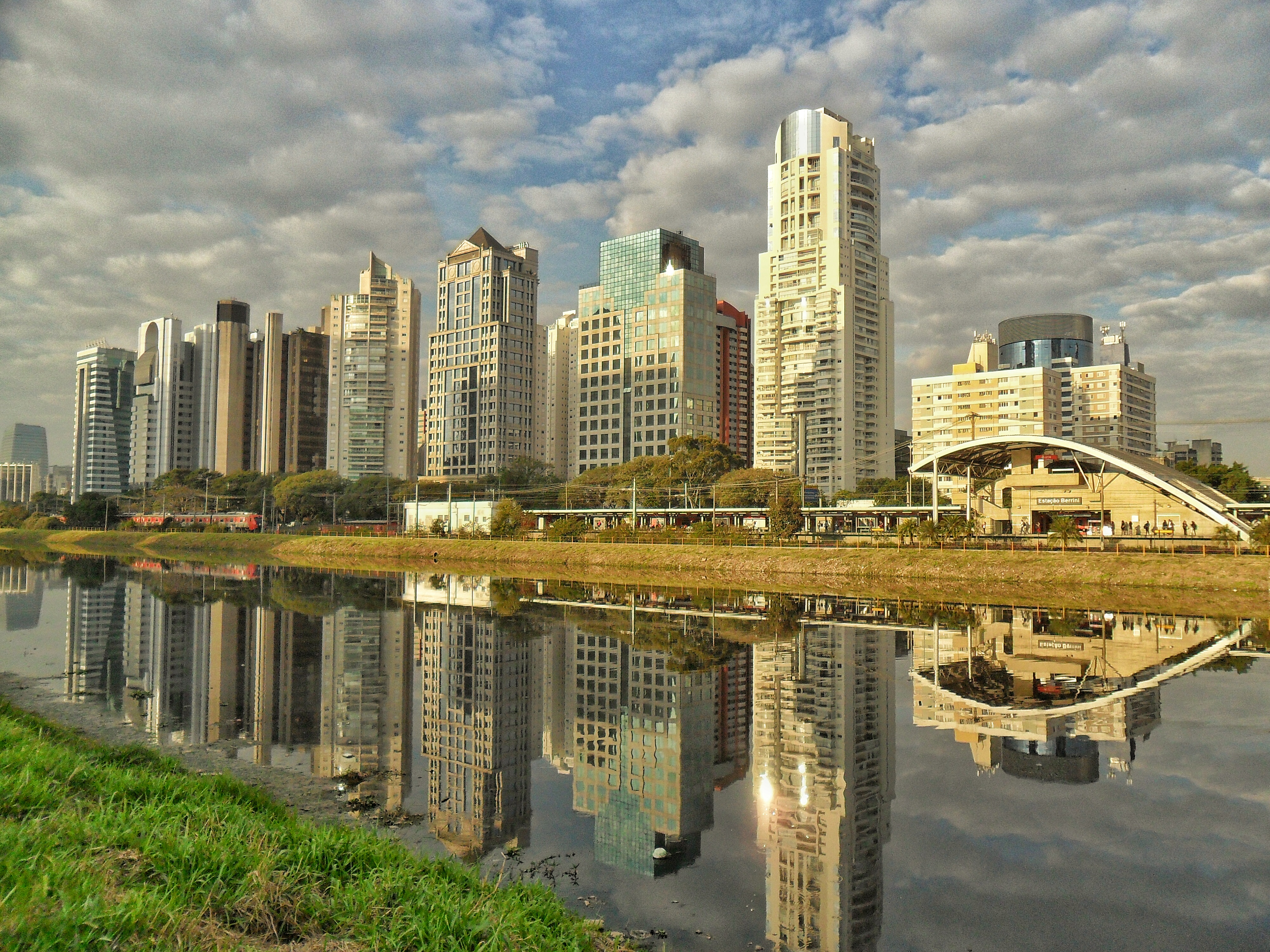

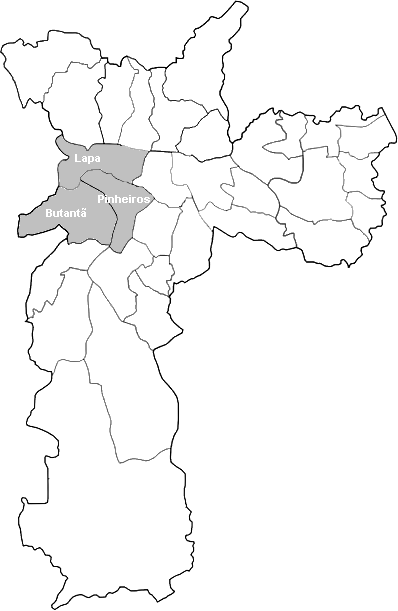
- Location of West Zone of São Paulo
- Country: Brazil
- State: São Paulo
- City: São Paulo
- Subprefectures: West Zone: Lapa; Pinheiros; Butantã

The West Zone is an Administrative Zone of São Paulo, Brazil.
