= McDelivery =

Food delivery service run by McDonald's

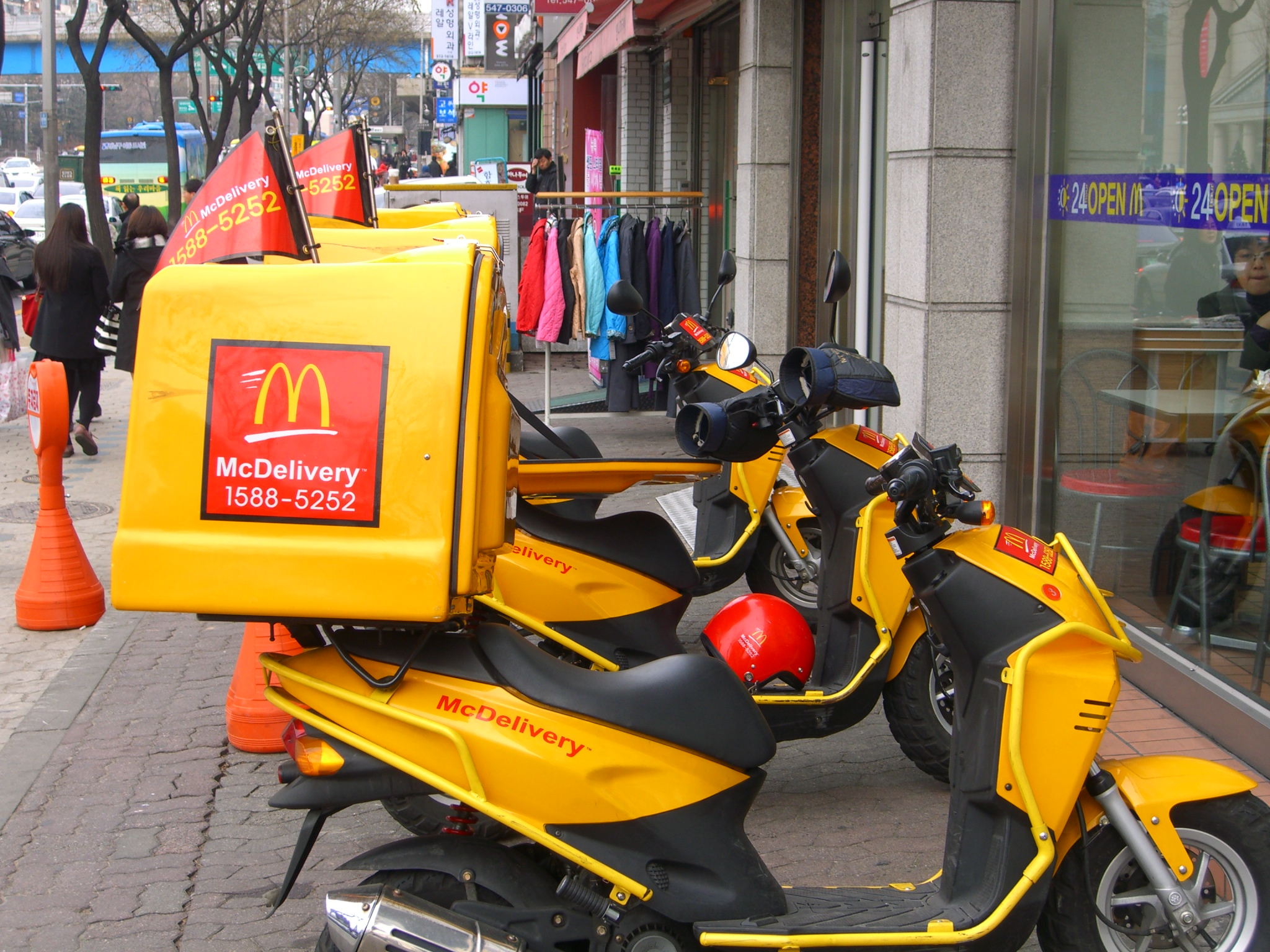
- McDelivery motorcycles in South Korea, 2008
- Type: Subsidiary
- Industry: Online food ordering
- Parent: McDonald's

McDelivery is a McDonald's service that delivers food to the customer's door. The service was introduced in parts of the United States beginning in 1993 and is available in many Asian, Middle Eastern and Latin American countries using motorcycle couriers. In some countries, McDelivery is available 24 hours a day, and in certain locations is free with a minimum order.

== Security and privacy ==
=== McDelivery India API vulnerability (2024) ===
The incident was a set of security flaws discovered in 2024 in the McDelivery platform used by McDonald's India (West & South) operated by Hardcastle Restaurants Pvt. Ltd. The vulnerability was discovered by a Traceable security researcher called Eaton Zveare..

The flaws stemmed from insufficient authentication and authorisation checks within the McDelivery APIs, which allowed unauthenticated users to perform unauthorised actions. These actions included manipulating a users own cart e.g. changing the cost of the products, altering other users' orders e.g. such as changing the delivery house, tracking drivers, and accessing sensitive data belonging to both customers and drivers. Furthermore, the vulnerability provided unauthorised access to McDonald’s internal KPI platform. Following the report, McDonald’s India remediated the affected systems.

=== McDelivery User Data Leak (2017) ===
A company called Fallible discovered that the app allegedly leaked personal information of 2.2 million users. They say that a misconfigured server allowed anyone to access; usernames, emails, home addresses and phone numbers by sending a simple request to an API without any authentication. McDonalds India put out an official message on Facebook that no data was leaked but suggested that users update the app as a precaution which was disputed by Fallible after.

== International availability ==
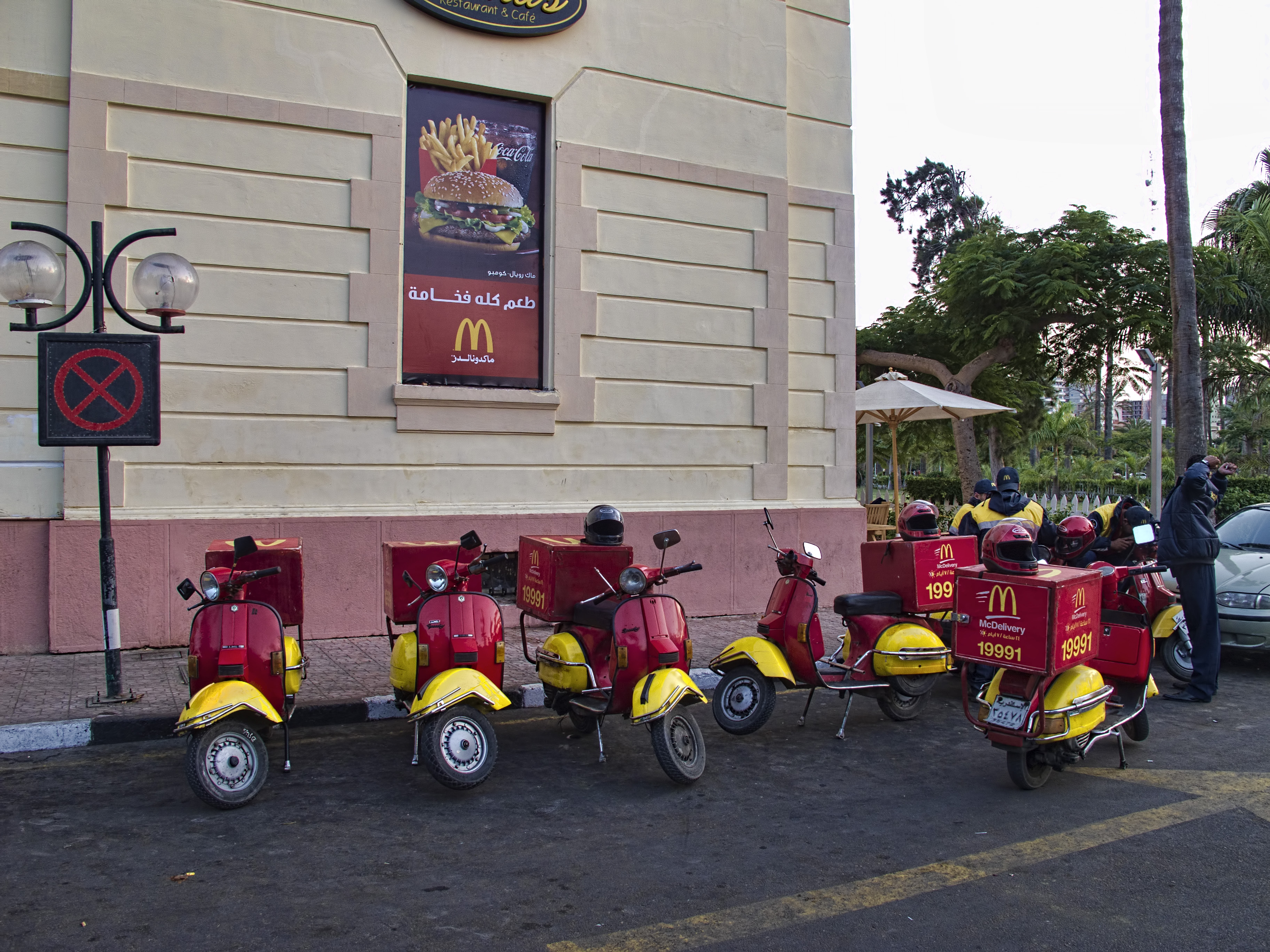
The McDonald's in Montaza in the eastern outskirts of Alexandria, Egypt has a fleet of delivery scooters, 2011.

McDelivery is available in Australia, Austria, Bahrain, Brazil, China, Colombia, Costa Rica, Chile, Cyprus, Egypt, Germany, Georgia, Guatemala, Hong Kong, India, Indonesia, Israel, Italy, Japan, Jordan, South Korea, Kuwait, Lebanon, Malaysia, New Zealand, Pakistan, Qatar, Philippines, Romania, Russia, Saudi Arabia, Singapore, Slovenia, South Africa, Spain, Sri Lanka, Taiwan, Thailand, Turkey, United Arab Emirates, Ukraine, United States, and the United Kingdom.

=== Austria ===
The first McDonald's delivery service on the European continent started in 2013 with a trial in Wien-Hietzing. Deliveries are now available all across the capital city from 11am to 11pm at a cost of €4 (US$4.44) and a minimum order requirement of €8 (US$8.87).

=== Australia ===
A trial of McDelivery began in Australia in November 2013. The service was rolled out more widely across the country from August 2014 in partnership with Menulog. Delivery times vary according to location. Some branches deliver breakfast, lunch and dinner but a 5pm-9pm window is most common. The delivery fee is typically A$4.95 ($3.72 USD) with a minimum order requirement of A$25 ($18.8 USD).

=== Brazil ===
McDelivery in Brazil began in June 2018. The order can be placed through their website or their app, as well as through iFood, Uber Eats or Rappi.

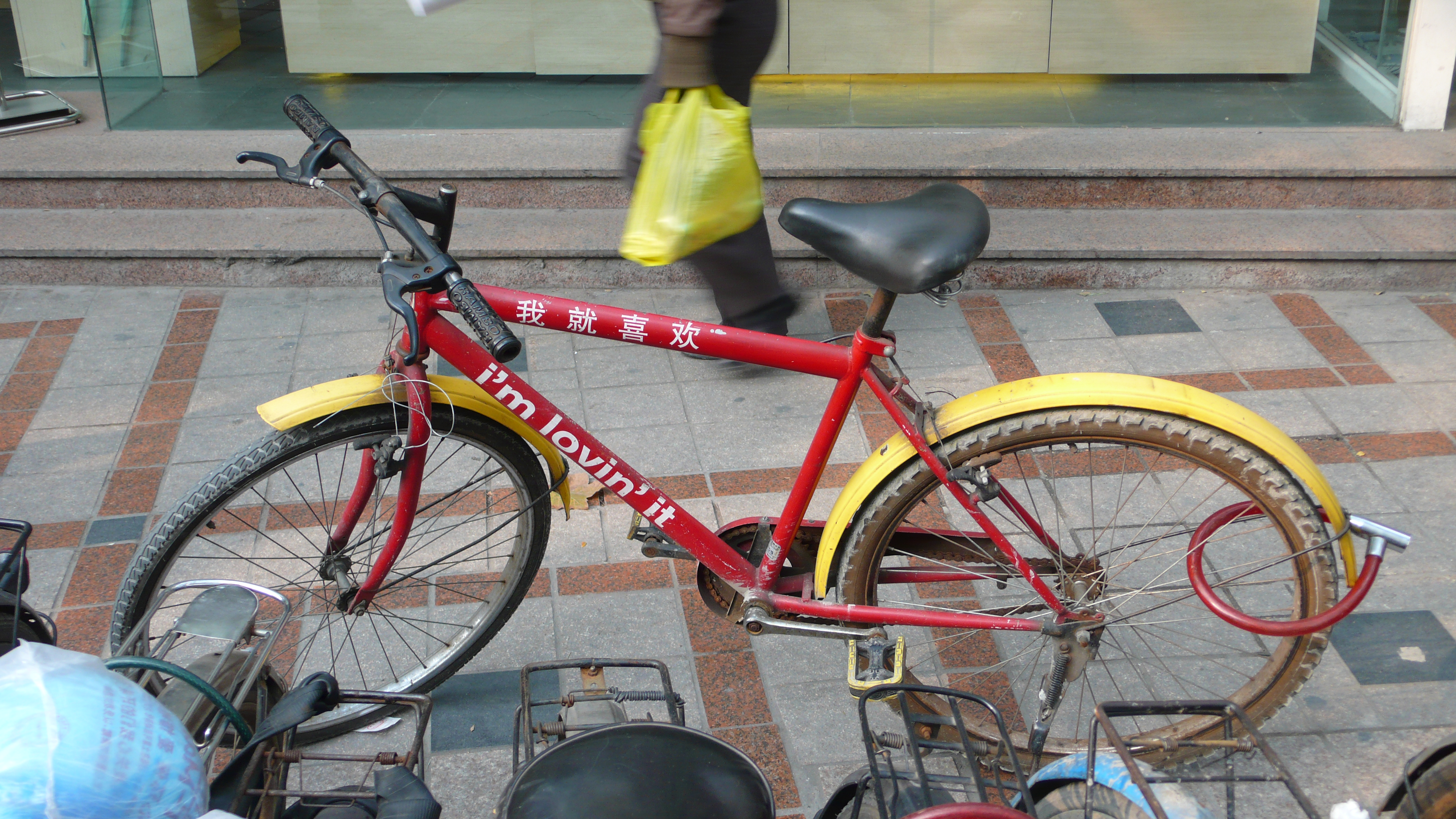
"I'm Lovin' It" bicycle delivery, Shanghai, China, 2007

=== Canada ===
McDelivery in Canada is done via Uber Eats, SkipTheDishes, and DoorDash. The availability of menu items varies by location.

=== China ===
In China, service is available 24 hours and the delivery fee is 8¥ (US$1.24).

=== Cyprus ===
McDelivery in Cyprus started in February 2014 from the Limassol restaurant only and then continued to include all main towns of Cyprus (Nicosia, Paphos, Limassol, Larnaka and Famagusta). Delivery is available from 11am to 1am at a limited radius for each town. The delivery cost is €2 (US$2.22) with a minimum order of €10 (US$11.09)The order can be placed via phone or through the McDonald's Cyprus website.

=== Hong Kong ===
In Hong Kong, 24-hour McDelivery was first introduced in 2009, available to majority of the urban area in the territory. Orders are made by telephone and can be placed up to 7 days in advance. As of 2012, the service costs HK$12 (US$1.54) for each delivery, with no minimum order requirement. The fee is waived if the value of the order exceeds HK$60 (US$7.72).

Most, if not all, orders are delivered on motorcycles, which are painted with McDonald's colours and logo. Logistics are outsourced to Rixon Delivery and Flow Logistics. The firm initially recruited delivery workers on a "self-employment" basis. The labour rights of the workers came to media attention in 2009, after some motorcyclists were severely injured in traffic accidents but were refused compensation. According to news reports, neglect on the part of Rixon may have contributed to these accidents, because of the way the delivery storage on the motorcycles was modified. After intervention by the Labour Department, Rixon retroactively recognized its delivery workers as employees, making them eligible for unemployment and other employee benefits.

=== India ===
McDelivery was introduced to India in 2004. The delivery fee is ₹33 (US$0.4).

=== Indonesia ===
In Indonesia, delivery costs Rp. 11,500 ($0.73 USD) with a minimum order of Rp. 21,500 ($1.5 USD).

=== Israel ===
McDelivery was introduced to Israel in 2016. Currently the service operates only in Tel Aviv, Ramat Gan, Bat Yam, Givatayim, Holon and Gush Dan. Delivery is free but there is an 80 ILS (US$22.64) minimum for an order.

=== Japan ===
In Japan, McDelivery is available from 7 am to 11 pm, with a ¥300 ($2.73 USD) delivery fee and a ¥1,500 ($13.67 USD) minimum order, or ¥1,000 ($9.11 USD) for morning deliveries.

=== Malaysia ===
McDelivery was introduced to Malaysia in March 1994. The delivery fee is 4.25 MYR (US$1.01). The service is available 24 hours, 7 days every week in certain areas. The minimum order is 18 MYR (US$4.30).

=== Netherlands ===
In The Netherlands, McDelivery is available since 2017 in selected cities such as Amsterdam, Rotterdam and Utrecht. Ordering can be done via the Uber Eats website or app. No minimum order is required, and the delivery fee is €2,50.

=== New Zealand ===
In New Zealand, McDelivery began operating in July 2016.

=== South Korea ===
In South Korea, 24 hour McDelivery was introduced in 2007, with a ₩7,000 ($6.12 USD) minimum order.

=== Pakistan ===
24 hour McDelivery is available in Pakistan, there is no minimum order limit or any delivery charges. Several exclusive delivery deals are available.

=== Philippines ===
In the Philippines, McDelivery is available in Metro Manila, and a few more cities in some provinces such as Metro Cebu, Davao, Laguna, Rizal, Cavite, Batangas, Tarlac, Nueva Ecija, Bulacan, Pampanga, Pangasinan, and Ilocos Norte. There is no minimum order required and the delivery charge is PHP49.00 (US$0.95).

=== Romania ===
McDelivery is available in all cities through online food delivery platforms Foodpanda, Glovo and Tazz.

Ukraine

McDelivery is currently available in Kyiv, Lviv, Kharkiv, Dnipro, Vinnytsia, Zaporizhia and Odesa via Uber Eats.

=== Russia ===
McDelivery (Russian: Макдоставка, McDostavka) was available in Moscow by UberEats, and is available in Moscow, St. Petersburg, Nizhny Novgorod, Rostov on Don, Ekaterinburg, Novosibirsk, Samara, Kazan, Ufa and Voronezh.

=== Singapore ===
In Singapore, McDelivery was introduced in 2002. 24 hour delivery service launched in 2005. McDelivery gained popularity during the COVID-19 period where residents stayed at home and discouraged non-essential travels.

There is a S$3.50 ($2.61 USD) delivery fee for online orders, a S$4 ($2.990 USD) fee for telephone orders, and a minimum order of S$10 (US$7.25) in industrial areas.

McDelivery only operates from 7am to 10.30pm during the COVID-19 period, later from 29 March 2022, it was extended to 5.30am - 12am, and followed by 26 April 2022, it was extended back to 24 hours.

=== Slovenia ===
In several street blocks of Ljubljana's downtown, McDonald's began its delivery service in June 2018. The company set the conditions for a minimum order of one whole meal. The orders can be made online via the ehrana.si online food ordering service.

=== South Africa ===
In parts of South Africa it is possible to order McDelivery.

=== Spain ===
In some parts of Spain, McDonald's delivers orders through its partners Glovo and Uber Eats.

=== Taiwan ===
In Taiwan, the delivery fee is NT$39 ($1.4 USD).

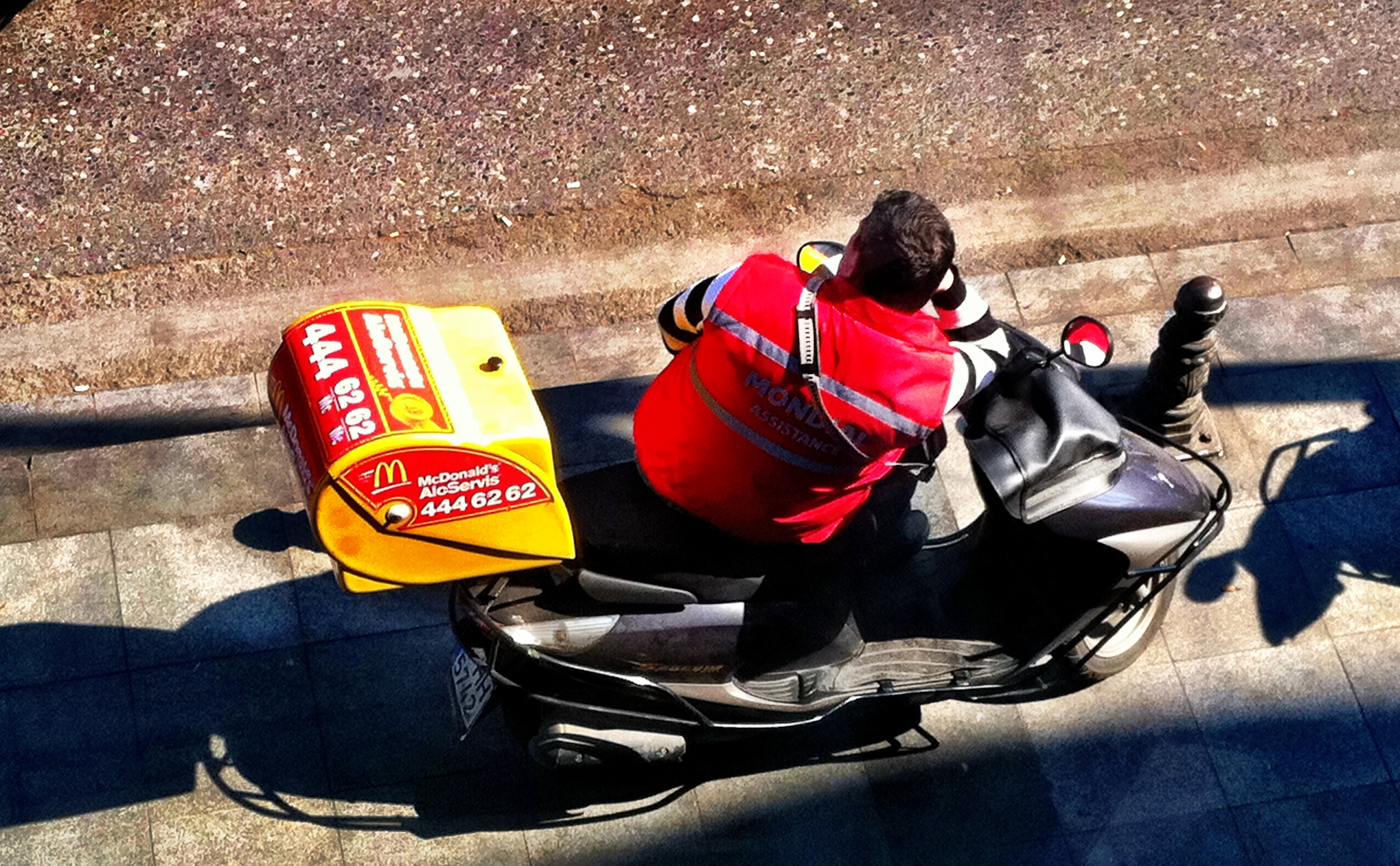
Istanbul, Turkey, 2012

=== Turkey ===
In Turkey delivery is free.

=== United Kingdom ===
A trial period for the service began in June 2017, prior to a potential formal roll-out of the service nationwide in 2017 using Uber Eats. McDelivery is offered on Uber Eats and Just Eat.

=== United States ===
In the United States, delivery began in 1993 in Virginia and expanded to Manhattan in 1994. In 2017, McDonald's launched McDelivery service to the rest of the United States via Uber Eats. On July 16, 2019, McDonald's announced it would also partner with DoorDash to further expand the availability of McDelivery. The delivery fee with both services varies based on the distance between the customer and the McDonald's restaurant from which they are ordering.
