= Fabricio Bloisi =

Brazilian business executive

Fabrício Bloisi
- Born: 1977 (age 48–49); Salvador, Bahia, Brazil
- Education: B.S. in Computer Science, State University of Campinas (1998); MBA, Fundação Getulio Vargas (2008)
- Occupation: Business executive
- Organization(s): Prosus and Naspers
- Known for: CEO of Prosus and Naspers; Former CEO of iFood; Founder of Movile
- Title: Chief Executive Officer

Fabrício Bloisi (born 1977) is a Brazilian business executive who is chief executive officer of Prosus and Naspers since July 2024. He was previously CEO of iFood, a food delivery platform, from 2019 to 2024, and founded the technology company Movile in 1998.

== Early life and education ==
Fabrício Bloisi was born in 1977 in Salvador, Bahia. At age 17, he moved to Campinas, São Paulo, to attend university. He studied computer science at the State University of Campinas (UNICAMP), graduating in 1998.

Bloisi later earned an MBA from Fundação Getulio Vargas (FGV) in 2008. He attended executive education programs at Stanford Graduate School of Business and Harvard Business School.

== Career ==
In 1998, while at UNICAMP, Bloisi co-founded a company initially called Intraweb with Fábio Póvoa. Which offered software and IT solutions.

In 2001, the company was acquired by GoWapCorp and renamed Compera, later becoming Movile. Under Bloisi's leadership, Movile expanded operations in Latin America.

In 2013, Movile invested in iFood, a food delivery startup founded in 2011. At the time, iFood had approximately 20 employees. Bloisi became CEO of iFood in 2019.

During Bloisi's tenure as CEO, iFood expanded its operations. According to company data cited by Folha de S.Paulo, the platform grew from 45 million to 60 million customers between March 2023 and February 2024, with monthly orders increasing from 38 million to 88 million during the same period. By 2024, iFood reported working with over 350,000 restaurants and 300,000 delivery workers.

In 2018, iFood raised $500 million in funding.

In May 2024, the boards of Prosus and Naspers appointed Bloisi as CEO of both companies, effective July 1, 2024. The companies are technology investors with holdings including Tencent and other firms.

As CEO, Bloisi has overseen acquisitions including Just Eat Takeaway.com for €4.3 billion in February 2025 and Despegar for $1.7 billion. According to Bloomberg, he has stated a goal to double the companies' market value to $200 billion by 2028.

== Controversy ==
In February 2024, Bloisi made statements to Folha de S.Paulo suggesting that within ten years, people would no longer cook at home because food delivery would become as affordable as home cooking. The comments generated criticism from culinary professionals and cultural commentators. Chef Rita Lobo publicly criticized the statements, according to Estado de S.Paulo. iFood subsequently issued a clarification statement.

As CEO of Prosus and Naspers, Bloisi has faced criticism from labor organizations. In August 2024, a Canadian-based shareholder association linked to trade unions challenged the companies' labor practices, according to TechCentral.

iFood's market position has also drawn scrutiny from competition authorities and competitors regarding market concentration issues.
