= Jitse =

Jitse is a Dutch given name. Notable people with the name include:

- Jitse Buitink (born 1978), Norwegian actor and politician
- Jitse Groen (born 1978), Dutch billionaire businessman, founder of Takeaway.com
- Jitse van der Veen (1928–1976), Dutch swimmer
