= 2020 Cook Out Southern 500 =

NASCAR Cup Series race

Race details
- Race 27 of 36 in the 2020 NASCAR Cup Series
- 2020 Cook Out Southern 500 program cover
- Date: September 6, 2020
- Location: Darlington Raceway in Darlington, South Carolina
- Course: Permanent racing facility
- Course length: 1.366 miles (2.198 km)
- Distance: 367 laps, 501.322 mi (806.666 km)
- Average speed: 132.256 miles per hour (212.845 km/h)

Pole position
Driver	Chase Elliott	Hendrick Motorsports
- Grid positions set by competition-based formula

Most laps led
Driver	Martin Truex Jr.	Joe Gibbs Racing
- Laps: 196

Winner
No. 4	Kevin Harvick	Stewart-Haas Racing

Television in the United States
- Network: NBCSN
- Announcers: Rick Allen, Jeff Burton, Steve Letarte, Dale Earnhardt Jr., Dale Jarrett and Kyle Petty
- Nielsen ratings: 1.4 (2.43 million)

Radio in the United States
- Radio: MRN
- Booth announcers: Alex Hayden, Jeff Striegle and Rusty Wallace
- Turn announcers: Dave Moody (1 & 2) and Mike Bagley (3 & 4)

The 2020 Cook Out Southern 500, the 71st running of the event, was a NASCAR Cup Series race held on September 6, 2020, at Darlington Raceway in Darlington, South Carolina. Contested over 367 laps on the 1.366-mile (2.198 km) egg-shaped oval, it was the 27th race of the 2020 NASCAR Cup Series season, first race of the Playoffs, and the first race of the Round of 16.

== Report ==
=== Background ===
Layout of Darlington Raceway, the track where the race is held.

Darlington Raceway is a race track built for NASCAR racing located near Darlington, South Carolina. It is nicknamed "The Lady in Black" and "The Track Too Tough to Tame" by many NASCAR fans and drivers and advertised as "A NASCAR Tradition." It is of a unique, somewhat egg-shaped design, an oval with the ends of very different configurations, a condition which supposedly arose from the proximity of one end of the track to a minnow pond the owner refused to relocate. This situation makes it very challenging for the crews to set up their cars' handling in a way that is effective at both ends.

==== Entry list ====
- (R) denotes rookie driver.
- (i) denotes driver who are ineligible for series driver points.

No.	Driver	Team	Manufacturer	Sponsor or Throwback
00	Quin Houff (R)	StarCom Racing	Chevrolet	Permatex – Scheme based on the Ford V-8 Roadster that driver Milt Marion piloted to victory during America's first stock car race, which was held at the Daytona Beach Course in 1936.
1	Kurt Busch	Chip Ganassi Racing	Chevrolet	Monster Energy
2	Brad Keselowski	Team Penske	Ford	Discount Tire – Keselowski's 2010 NASCAR Nationwide Series championship car; scheme also honors the 10th anniversary of Discount Tire's involvement with Team Penske. Keselowski would later decide to run this scheme through the remainder of the NASCAR Playoffs, and throughout the 2021 season.
3	Austin Dillon	Richard Childress Racing	Chevrolet	American Ethanol E15 – Scheme pays homage to Hall of Famer Junior Johnson.
4	Kevin Harvick	Stewart-Haas Racing	Ford	1997 Busch Beer design.
6	Ryan Newman	Roush Fenway Racing	Ford	Oscar Mayer – Newman's 1999 scheme from the USAC Silver Crown Series, where he won the National Championship.
7	Josh Bilicki (i)	Tommy Baldwin Racing	Chevrolet	Insurance King – Scheme paying homage to team owner Tommy Baldwin Jr.'s father, Tommy Baldwin Sr.
8	Tyler Reddick (R)	Richard Childress Racing	Chevrolet	Cat Power – Jeff Burton's 1994 Rookie of the Year Raybestos car.
9	Chase Elliott	Hendrick Motorsports	Chevrolet	NAPA Auto Parts – Jimmie Johnson's 2009 paint scheme.
10	Aric Almirola	Stewart-Haas Racing	Ford	Go Bowling – Hall of Famer Fireball Roberts's 1957 NASCAR Grand National Series paint scheme.
11	Denny Hamlin	Joe Gibbs Racing	Toyota	1973 FedEx design and Hall of Famer Cale Yarborough inspired car.
12	Ryan Blaney	Team Penske	Ford	Menards/Maytag – Scheme honors Paul Menard and his 2003 ARCA victory at Talladega.
13	Ty Dillon	Germain Racing	Chevrolet	GEICO – Todd Bodine's 2010 NASCAR Camping World Truck Series Championship paint scheme.
14	Clint Bowyer	Stewart-Haas Racing	Ford	PEAK – Kyle Petty's 1990 Goodwrench 500 winning car.
15	Brennan Poole (R)	Premium Motorsports	Chevrolet	R.E.D. – Ricky Rudd's red Bud Moore Engineering paint scheme from the mid-80's
17	Chris Buescher	Roush Fenway Racing	Ford	Fastenal
18	Kyle Busch	Joe Gibbs Racing	Toyota	M&M's – Elliott Sadler's 2004 NASCAR Nextel Cup Series car.
19	Martin Truex Jr.	Joe Gibbs Racing	Toyota	Bass Pro Shops – Hank Parker Jr.'s 2003 Aaron's 312 car.
20	Erik Jones	Joe Gibbs Racing	Toyota	Sport Clips – Tony Stewart's 2005 Martinsville Home Depot inspired car.
21	Matt DiBenedetto	Wood Brothers Racing	Ford	Ford Motorcraft/Quick Lane Tire & Auto Center – Tiny Lund's 1963 Daytona 500 inspired car.
22	Joey Logano	Team Penske	Ford	Shell Pennzoil – Bobby Allison's 1985 Miller car.
24	William Byron	Hendrick Motorsports	Chevrolet	Liberty University – Jimmie Johnson's 2013 NASCAR Sprint All-Star Race paint scheme.
27	J. J. Yeley (i)	Rick Ware Racing	Ford	Jacob Companies – Kenny Irwin Jr.'s 1997 Nerf car.
32	Corey LaJoie	Go Fas Racing	Ford	Trump 2020
34	Michael McDowell	Front Row Motorsports	Ford	Love's Travel Stops
37	Ryan Preece	JTG Daugherty Racing	Chevrolet	Bush's Beans
38	John Hunter Nemechek (R)	Front Row Motorsports	Ford	Citgard – Elliott Sadler's 1999 NASCAR Winston Cup Series inspired car.
41	Cole Custer (R)	Stewart-Haas Racing	Ford	Haas Automation – 1956 Southern 500 and Hall of Famer Curtis Turner's 1965 NASCAR Grand National Series inspired car.
42	Matt Kenseth	Chip Ganassi Racing	Chevrolet	McDelivery
43	Bubba Wallace	Richard Petty Motorsports	Chevrolet	Cash App – Scheme will honor Team Owner and Hall of Famer Richard Petty and his one-off 1986 Darlington ride in D. K. Ulrich's No. 6 Chevrolet.
47	Ricky Stenhouse Jr.	JTG Daugherty Racing	Chevrolet	Kroger
48	Jimmie Johnson	Hendrick Motorsports	Chevrolet	Ally – Scheme honors Hall of Famers and seven-time Cup Series Champions Richard Petty and Dale Earnhardt.
51	Joey Gase (i)	Petty Ware Racing	Ford	Agri Supplies – Bobby Allison's 1971 Southern 500 inspired car.
53	James Davison	Rick Ware Racing	Chevrolet	Signing Day Sports – Tom Sneva's 1983 NASCAR Winston Cup Series inspired car.
66	Timmy Hill (i)	MBM Motorsports	Toyota	RoofClaim.com – Phil Parsons' 1984 Skoal Bandit scheme.
77	Ross Chastain (i)	Spire Motorsports	Chevrolet	Dirty Mo Media – Hall of Famer Dale Earnhardt's 1976 NASCAR Winston Cup Series paint scheme.
88	Alex Bowman	Hendrick Motorsports	Chevrolet	ChevyGoods.com – Jimmie Johnson's 2006-2008 paint scheme.
95	Christopher Bell (R)	Leavine Family Racing	Toyota	Rheem – Bell's 2017 NASCAR Camping World Truck Series championship paint scheme.
96	Daniel Suárez	Gaunt Brothers Racing	Toyota	Arris Now CommScope – Suárez's 2016 NASCAR Xfinity Series championship paint scheme.
Official entry list

== Qualifying ==
Chase Elliott was awarded the pole for the race as determined by competition-based formula.

=== Starting Lineup ===
Pos	No.	Driver	Team	Manufacturer
1	9	Chase Elliott	Hendrick Motorsports	Chevrolet
2	11	Denny Hamlin	Joe Gibbs Racing	Toyota
3	24	William Byron	Hendrick Motorsports	Chevrolet
4	88	Alex Bowman	Hendrick Motorsports	Chevrolet
5	2	Brad Keselowski	Team Penske	Ford
6	19	Martin Truex Jr.	Joe Gibbs Racing	Toyota
7	12	Ryan Blaney	Team Penske	Ford
8	4	Kevin Harvick	Stewart-Haas Racing	Ford
9	14	Clint Bowyer	Stewart-Haas Racing	Ford
10	10	Aric Almirola	Stewart-Haas Racing	Ford
11	21	Matt DiBenedetto	Wood Brothers Racing	Ford
12	3	Austin Dillon	Richard Childress Racing	Chevrolet
13	22	Joey Logano	Team Penske	Ford
14	41	Cole Custer (R)	Stewart-Haas Racing	Ford
15	18	Kyle Busch	Joe Gibbs Racing	Toyota
16	1	Kurt Busch	Chip Ganassi Racing	Chevrolet
17	43	Bubba Wallace	Richard Petty Motorsports	Chevrolet
18	38	John Hunter Nemechek (R)	Front Row Motorsports	Ford
19	34	Michael McDowell	Front Row Motorsports	Ford
20	17	Chris Buescher	Roush Fenway Racing	Ford
21	95	Christopher Bell (R)	Leavine Family Racing	Toyota
22	48	Jimmie Johnson	Hendrick Motorsports	Chevrolet
23	15	Brennan Poole (R)	Premium Motorsports	Chevrolet
24	8	Tyler Reddick (R)	Richard Childress Racing	Chevrolet
25	13	Ty Dillon	Germain Racing	Chevrolet
26	42	Matt Kenseth	Chip Ganassi Racing	Chevrolet
27	32	Corey LaJoie	Go Fas Racing	Ford
28	96	Daniel Suárez	Gaunt Brothers Racing	Toyota
29	47	Ricky Stenhouse Jr.	JTG Daugherty Racing	Chevrolet
30	20	Erik Jones	Joe Gibbs Racing	Toyota
31	6	Ryan Newman	Roush Fenway Racing	Ford
32	00	Quin Houff (R)	StarCom Racing	Chevrolet
33	66	Timmy Hill (i)	MBM Motorsports	Toyota
34	77	Ross Chastain (i)	Spire Motorsports	Chevrolet
35	37	Ryan Preece	JTG Daugherty Racing	Chevrolet
36	53	James Davison	Rick Ware Racing	Chevrolet
37	27	J. J. Yeley (i)	Rick Ware Racing	Ford
38	7	Josh Bilicki (i)	Tommy Baldwin Racing	Chevrolet
39	51	Joey Gase (i)	Petty Ware Racing	Ford
Official starting lineup

== Race ==
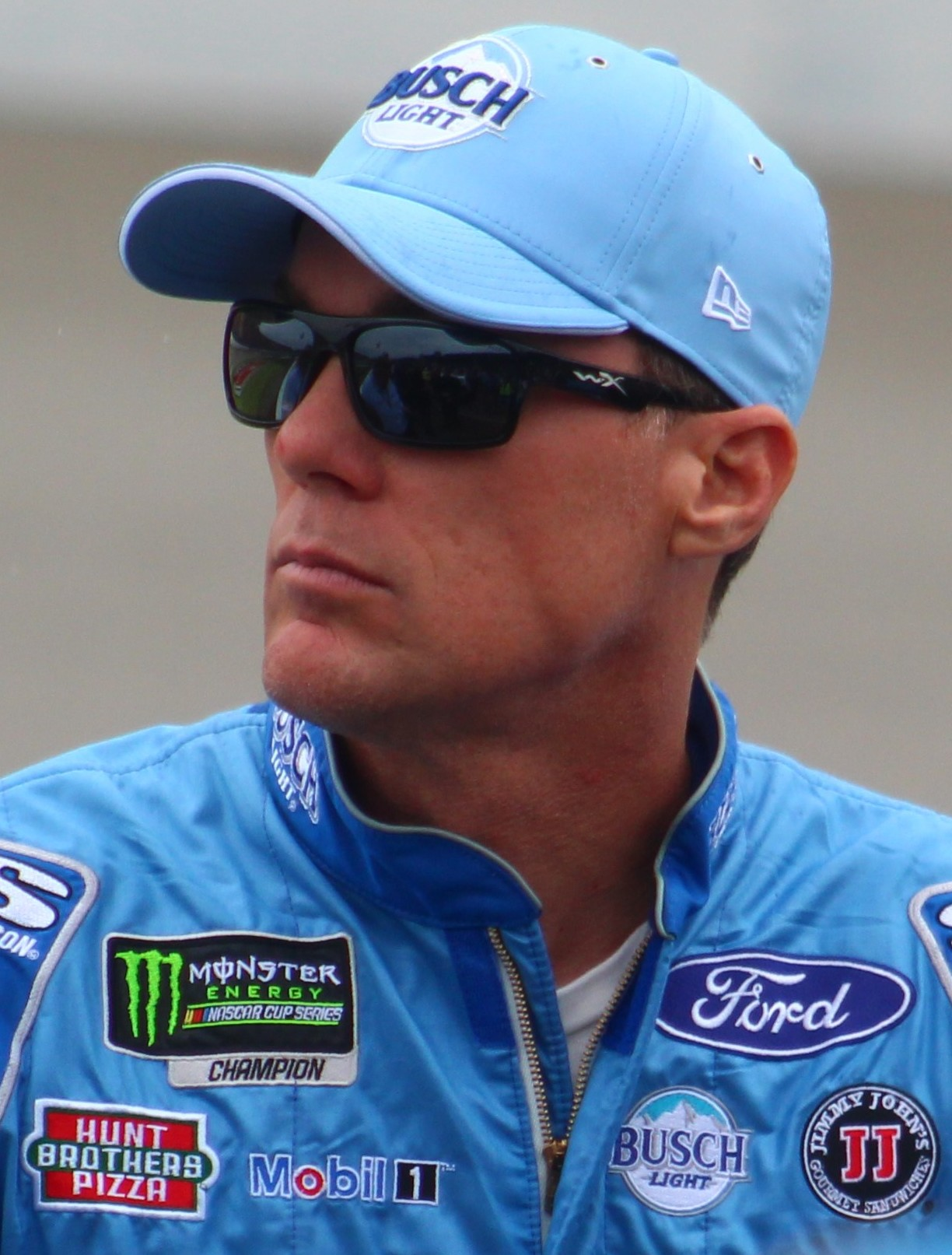
Kevin Harvick won the race.

=== Stage Results ===
Stage One Laps: 115

Pos	No	Driver	Team	Manufacturer	Points
1	19	Martin Truex Jr.	Joe Gibbs Racing	Toyota	10
2	48	Jimmie Johnson	Hendrick Motorsports	Chevrolet	9
3	9	Chase Elliott	Hendrick Motorsports	Chevrolet	8
4	11	Denny Hamlin	Joe Gibbs Racing	Toyota	7
5	1	Kurt Busch	Chip Ganassi Racing	Chevrolet	6
6	88	Alex Bowman	Hendrick Motorsports	Chevrolet	5
7	22	Joey Logano	Team Penske	Ford	4
8	24	William Byron	Hendrick Motorsports	Chevrolet	3
9	18	Kyle Busch	Joe Gibbs Racing	Toyota	2
10	4	Kevin Harvick	Stewart-Haas Racing	Ford	1
Official stage one results

Stage Two Laps: 115

Pos	No	Driver	Team	Manufacturer	Points
1	19	Martin Truex Jr.	Joe Gibbs Racing	Toyota	10
2	11	Denny Hamlin	Joe Gibbs Racing	Toyota	9
3	4	Kevin Harvick	Stewart-Haas Racing	Ford	8
4	88	Alex Bowman	Hendrick Motorsports	Chevrolet	7
5	48	Jimmie Johnson	Hendrick Motorsports	Chevrolet	6
6	18	Kyle Busch	Joe Gibbs Racing	Toyota	5
7	20	Erik Jones	Joe Gibbs Racing	Toyota	4
8	3	Austin Dillon	Richard Childress Racing	Chevrolet	3
9	14	Clint Bowyer	Stewart-Haas Racing	Ford	2
10	1	Kurt Busch	Chip Ganassi Racing	Chevrolet	1
Official stage two results

=== Final Stage Results ===
Stage Three Laps: 137

Pos	Grid	No	Driver	Team	Manufacturer	Laps	Points
1	8	4	Kevin Harvick	Stewart-Haas Racing	Ford	367	49
2	12	3	Austin Dillon	Richard Childress Racing	Chevrolet	367	38
3	13	22	Joey Logano	Team Penske	Ford	367	38
4	30	20	Erik Jones	Joe Gibbs Racing	Toyota	367	37
5	3	24	William Byron	Hendrick Motorsports	Chevrolet	367	35
6	4	88	Alex Bowman	Hendrick Motorsports	Chevrolet	367	43
7	15	18	Kyle Busch	Joe Gibbs Racing	Toyota	367	37
8	16	1	Kurt Busch	Chip Ganassi Racing	Chevrolet	367	36
9	10	10	Aric Almirola	Stewart-Haas Racing	Ford	367	28
10	9	14	Clint Bowyer	Stewart-Haas Racing	Ford	367	29
11	5	2	Brad Keselowski	Team Penske	Ford	367	26
12	14	41	Cole Custer (R)	Stewart-Haas Racing	Ford	367	25
13	2	11	Denny Hamlin	Joe Gibbs Racing	Toyota	367	40
14	26	42	Matt Kenseth	Chip Ganassi Racing	Chevrolet	367	23
15	31	6	Ryan Newman	Roush Fenway Racing	Ford	367	22
16	19	34	Michael McDowell	Front Row Motorsports	Ford	367	21
17	35	37	Ryan Preece	JTG Daugherty Racing	Chevrolet	367	20
18	22	48	Jimmie Johnson	Hendrick Motorsports	Chevrolet	367	34
19	29	47	Ricky Stenhouse Jr.	JTG Daugherty Racing	Chevrolet	367	18
20	1	9	Chase Elliott	Hendrick Motorsports	Chevrolet	367	25
21	11	21	Matt DiBenedetto	Wood Brothers Racing	Ford	366	16
22	6	19	Martin Truex Jr.	Joe Gibbs Racing	Toyota	366	35
23	24	8	Tyler Reddick (R)	Richard Childress Racing	Chevrolet	366	14
24	7	12	Ryan Blaney	Team Penske	Ford	366	13
25	28	96	Daniel Suárez	Gaunt Brothers Racing	Toyota	364	12
26	20	17	Chris Buescher	Roush Fenway Racing	Ford	364	11
27	25	13	Ty Dillon	Germain Racing	Chevrolet	363	10
28	23	15	Brennan Poole (R)	Premium Motorsports	Chevrolet	362	9
29	34	77	Ross Chastain (i)	Spire Motorsports	Chevrolet	360	0
30	37	27	J. J. Yeley (i)	Rick Ware Racing	Ford	360	0
31	32	00	Quin Houff (R)	StarCom Racing	Chevrolet	357	6
32	38	7	Josh Bilicki (i)	Tommy Baldwin Racing	Chevrolet	356	0
33	39	51	Joey Gase (i)	Petty Ware Racing	Ford	351	0
34	21	95	Christopher Bell (R)	Leavine Family Racing	Toyota	349	3
35	33	66	Timmy Hill (i)	MBM Motorsports	Toyota	296	0
36	18	38	John Hunter Nemechek (R)	Front Row Motorsports	Ford	245	1
37	27	32	Corey LaJoie	Go Fas Racing	Ford	234	1
38	17	43	Bubba Wallace	Richard Petty Motorsports	Chevrolet	217	1
39	36	53	James Davison	Rick Ware Racing	Chevrolet	162	1
Official race results

=== Race statistics ===
- Lead changes: 18 among 6 different drivers
- Cautions/Laps: 7 for 34
- Red flags: 0
- Time of race: 3 hours, 47 minutes and 26 seconds
- Average speed: 132.256 miles per hour (212.845 km/h)

== Media ==
=== Television ===
NBC Sports covered the race on the television side. Rick Allen, two–time Darlington winner Jeff Burton, Steve Letarte and Dale Earnhardt Jr. covered the race from the booth at Charlotte Motor Speedway. Earnhardt Jr., Dale Jarrett and Kyle Petty also called a portion of the race as part of the Throwback Weekend, Dave Burns, Parker Kligerman and Marty Snider handled the pit road duties on site, and Rutledge Wood handled the features from his home during the race.

NBCSN
Booth announcers	Pit reporters	Features reporter
Lap-by-lap: Rick Allen; Color-commentator: Jeff Burton; Color-commentator: Steve Letarte; Color-commentator: Dale Earnhardt Jr. Throwback commentator: Dale Jarrett; Throwback commentator: Kyle Petty	Dave Burns; Parker Kligerman; Marty Snider	Rutledge Wood

=== Radio ===
MRN had the radio call for the race, which was also simulcast on Sirius XM NASCAR Radio.

MRN Radio
Booth announcers	Turn announcers	Pit reporters
Lead announcer: Alex Hayden; Announcer: Jeff Striegle; Announcer: Rusty Wallace	Turns 1 & 2: Dave Moody; Turns 3 & 4: Mike Bagley	Winston Kelley; Steve Post

== Standings after the race ==
Drivers' Championship standings

	Pos	Driver	Points
	1	Kevin Harvick	2,106
	2	Denny Hamlin	2,087 (–19)
1	3	Joey Logano	2,060 (–46)
1	4	Brad Keselowski	2,055 (–51)
3	5	Alex Bowman	2,052 (–54)
	6	Martin Truex Jr.	2,049 (–57)
2	7	Chase Elliott	2,045 (–61)
2	8	Austin Dillon	2,043 (–63)
	9	William Byron	2,042 (–64)
4	10	Kyle Busch	2,040 (–66)
4	11	Kurt Busch	2,037 (–69)
	12	Aric Almirola	2,033 (–73)
	13	Clint Bowyer	2,033 (–73)
3	14	Cole Custer	2,030 (–76)
1	15	Matt DiBenedetto	2,016 (–90)
9	16	Ryan Blaney	2,016 (–90)
Official driver's standings

Manufacturers' Championship standings

Pos	Manufacturer	Points
1	Ford	1,004
2	Toyota	947 (–57)
3	Chevrolet	906 (–98)

- Note: Only the first 16 positions are included for the driver standings.

Previous race: 2020 Coke Zero Sugar 400	NASCAR Cup Series; 2020 season	Next race: 2020 Federated Auto Parts 400
