= MasterChef Confeitaria season 2 =

MasterChef Confeitaria
- Season 2
- Judges: Érick Jacquin; Helena Rizzo; Diego Lozano
- No. of contestants: 14
- Winner: Leo
- Runner-up: Ramiro
- No. of episodes: 10

Release
- Original network: Band
- Original release: September 9 – November 11, 2025

Season chronology
- ← Previous; Season 1

The second season of the Brazilian competitive reality television series MasterChef Confeitaria premiered on September 9, 2025, at 10:30 p.m. (BRT) on Band.

Ana Paula Padrão, who hosted the first season, left the franchise, and her on-screen duties were jointly assumed by the judges. Bruna Thedy continued as narrator and voice-over artist, a role she had taken over in the twelfth season of MasterChef.

Érick Jacquin, Helena Rizzo, and Diego Lozano returned as judges. Henrique Fogaça, who served as a judge in season one, did not return due to family reasons.

The grand prize consisted of R$150.000, plus R$50.000 courtesy of iFood along with specialized consultancy for the winner's future restaurant, R$100.000 from Asaas, and the MasterChef Confeitaria trophy.

Baker Leo Salles won the competition over baker Ramiro Bertassin on November 11, 2025.

== Contestants ==
=== Top 14 ===
Contestant	Age	Hometown	Result	Winnings	Finish
Leo Salles	29	São Paulo	Winner on November 11	7	1st
Ramiro Bertassin	47	São Paulo	Runner-up on November 11	4	2nd
Italo Andrade	28	Salvador	Eliminated on November 4	4	3rd
Luiza Vilhena	31	Belo Horizonte	Eliminated on November 4	3	3rd
Marina Queiroz	51	Botucatu	Eliminated on October 28	3	5th
Johnlee Justino	44	Caxias do Sul	Eliminated on October 21	3	6th
Natan Montenegro	27	Rio de Janeiro	Eliminated on October 14	2	7th
Juliana Braga	43	Vinhedo	Eliminated on October 7	2	8th
Letícia Momma	28	São Paulo	Eliminated on September 30	2	9th
Wagner Nascimento	45	Itambacuri	Eliminated on September 23	1	10th
Lucas Constantini	35	Bueno Brandão	Eliminated on September 16	0	11th
Aline Gonçalves	35	Curitiba	Eliminated on September 9	0	12th
Jéssica Paiva	27	São Paulo	Eliminated on September 9	0	13th
Julia Abduch	28	São Paulo	Eliminated on September 9	0	13th

== Elimination table ==
Place	Contestant	Episode																
Place	Contestant	1		2	3		4		5		6		7	8		9		10
1	Leo	IN	WIN	WIN	LOW	WIN	WIN	IMM	HIGH	LOW	IN	LOW	WIN	IN	WIN	WIN	IMM	WINNER
2	Ramiro	IN	IMM	WIN	LOW	HIGH	LOW	LOW	HIGH	IMM	WIN	IMM	WIN	IN	LOW	HIGH	WIN	RUNNER-UP
3	Italo	HIGH	IMM	WIN	LOW	HIGH	LOW	HIGH	IN	HIGH	IN	WIN	WIN	WIN	IMM	IN	ELIM	
3	Luiza	HIGH	IMM	HIGH	LOW	LOW	LOW	WIN	WIN	IMM	IN	HIGH	WIN	HIGH	LOW	IN	ELIM	
5	Marina	WIN	IMM	WIN	WIN	IMM	LOW	LOW	IN	LOW	HIGH	IMM	LOW	IN	ELIM			
6	Johnlee	HIGH	IMM	HIGH	WIN	IMM	WIN	IMM	WIN	IMM	IN	LOW	ELIM					
7	Natan	HIGH	IMM	LOW	WIN	IMM	LOW	IN	IN	WIN	IN	ELIM						
8	Juliana	IN	LOW	LOW	WIN	IMM	WIN	IMM	IN	ELIM								
9	Letícia	IN	HIGH	WIN	WIN	IMM	LOW	ELIM										
10	Wagner	IN	HIGH	WIN	LOW	ELIM												
11	Lucas	IN	LOW	ELIM														
12	Aline	IN	ELIM															
13	Jéssica	ELIM																
13	Julia	ELIM																

Key

- The baker won MasterChef Confeitaria.
- The baker was the runner-up.
- The baker won the individual challenge (Mystery Box or Elimination Test).
- The baker was one of the top entries in the individual challenge but did not win.
- The baker did not have to compete in that round and was safe from elimination.
- The baker was not selected as a top or bottom entry in an individual challenge.
- The baker was one of the bottom entries in the Mystery Box and received a disadvantaged in the Elimination Test.
- The baker was on the winning team in the Team Challenge.
- The baker was on the losing team in the Team Challenge.
- The baker was one of the bottom entries in an individual challenge but was saved first.
- The baker was one of the bottom entries in an individual challenge but was saved last.
- The baker won the Reinstation Challenge and returned to the competition.
- The baker was not eligible to compete in that round.
- The baker had to withdraw from the competition.
- The baker was eliminated from MasterChef Confeitaria.

== Guest appearances ==
Episode 1

- Narcisa Tamborindeguy

Episode 4

- Chef Javier Guillen

Episode 5

- Chef Alê Costa

Episode 7

- Bruno Kayapy (Helena's husband)
- Deise Cardoso (Diego's fiancé)
- Rosangela Menezes (Jacquin's wife)

Episode 10

- Chef Antônio Bachour

== Ratings and reception ==
=== Brazilian ratings ===
All numbers are in points and provided by Kantar Ibope Media.

Episode	Title	Air date	Timeslot (BRT)	SP viewers (in points)	BR viewers (in points)	Ref.
1	Top 14	September 9, 2025	Tuesday 10:30 p.m.	0.8	Outside top 10	
2	Top 11	September 16, 2025	Tuesday 10:30 p.m.	1.2	0.9	
3	Top 10	September 23, 2025	Tuesday 10:30 p.m.	1.1	1.0	
4	Top 9	September 30, 2025	Tuesday 10:30 p.m.	1.3	1.0	
5	Top 8	October 7, 2025	Tuesday 10:30 p.m.	1.0	Outside top 10	
6	Top 7	October 14, 2025	Tuesday 10:30 p.m.	1.1	Outside top 10	
7	Top 6	October 21, 2025	Tuesday 10:30 p.m.	1.3	1.1	
8	Top 5	October 28, 2025	Tuesday 10:30 p.m.	1.0	1.0	
9	Top 4	November 4, 2025	Tuesday 10:30 p.m.	1.1	Outside top 10	
10	Winner announced	November 11, 2025	Tuesday 10:30 p.m.	1.2	0.9	

- In 2025, each point represents 270.631 households in 15 market cities in Brazil (77.488 households in São Paulo).
