= Movile =

Movile may refer to:

- Movile, a village in the commune Iacobeni, Sibiu County, Romania
- Movile Cave in Constanța County, Romania
- Movile (company)
