= Jitse Groen =

Dutch businessman

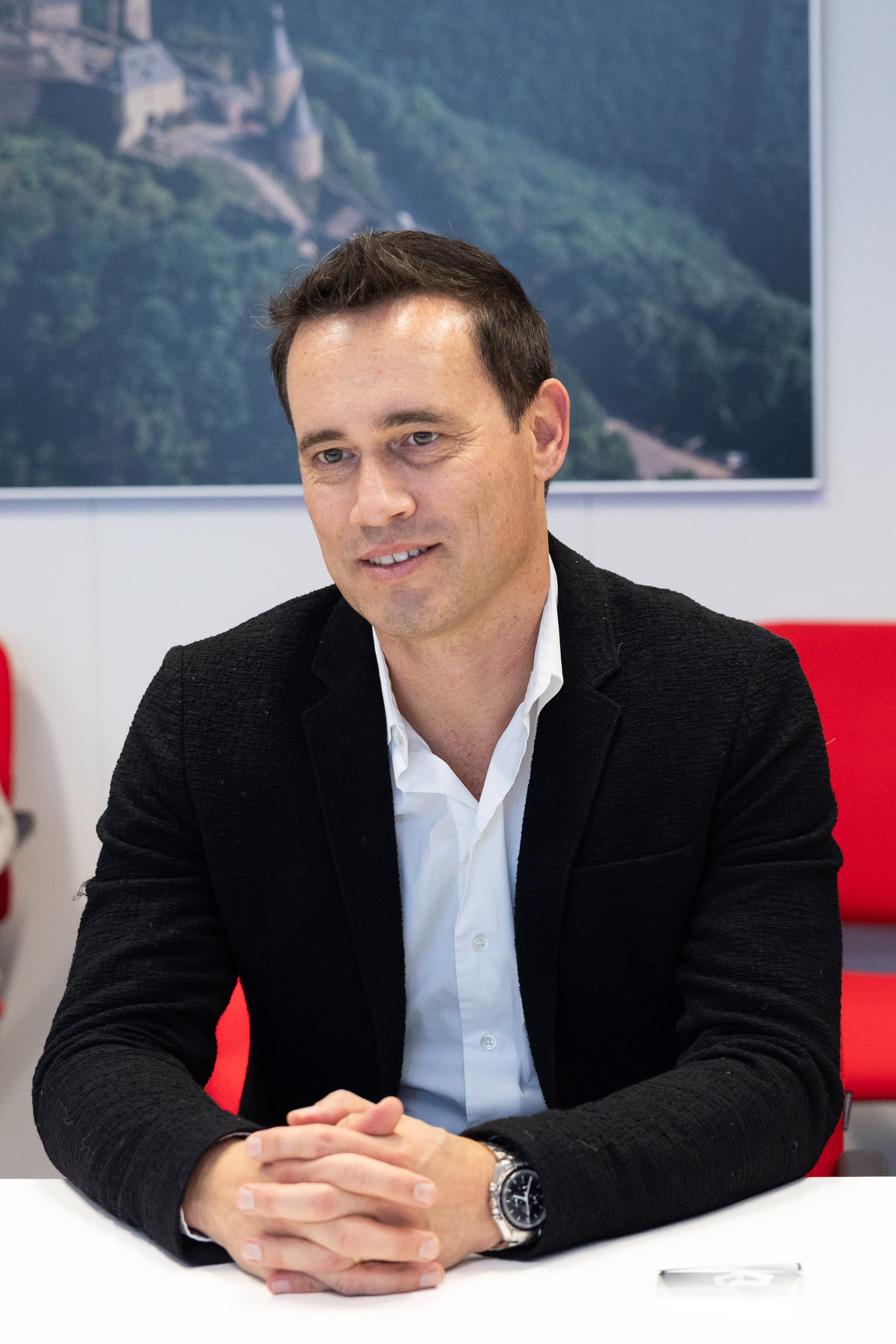
- Groen in 2023
- Born: 2 June 1978 (age 48); Delft, Netherlands
- Education: University of Twente
- Occupation: Businessman
- Title: Founder and CEO, Takeaway.com

Jitse Groen (born 2 June 1978) is a Dutch businessman and the founder of Just Eat Takeaway.com (formerly Takeaway.com), a global food delivery platform. He is the outgoing chief executive officer of the company, having announced his resignation following the firm's acquisition by Prosus in 2025.

== Early life ==
Groen was born in Delft in 1978 and raised in the villages Kolhorn and 't Veld. His mother worked as a teacher and his father was an automation engineer. He studied business information technology at the University of Twente, but never completed his bachelor's degree.

== Career ==
Groen founded Takeaway.com (originally known as Thuisbezorgd.nl) in 2000, at the age of 21, while he was a student in Business Information Technology at the University of Twente. He came up with the idea for his business after being unable to get a takeaway delivery in North Holland for a birthday celebration with his family. The nearest options for takeaway delivery were in Amsterdam, which was about 60 kilometres (37 mi) away. It was not until 2003 that Groen quit his study as Takeaway.com entered a critical growth phase. In 2012, Groen raised €13 million to expand it as Takeaway.com to other countries. Groen took Takeaway.com public on the Euronext Amsterdam stock exchange in 2016, in order to fund expansion of Takeaway.com in Germany and other European countries.

In 2018, Groen took over Takeaway.com's main competitors in Germany from Delivery Hero. When Takeaway.com merged with British company Just Eat in 2020, Groen became chief executive of the merged organisation. Groen also owns 11.3% of the merged business; he previously owned 35% of Takeaway.com. In 2017, Quote magazine listed Groen as the Netherlands' richest self-made millionaire under 40. In 2018, he became a billionaire, as the interest on his Takeaway.com shares was over 1 billion euros.

In 2020 Groen announced plans to bring to an end the use of gig workers at his company, stating that "We want to be certain they do have benefits, that we do pay taxes on those workers." The next year, Groen announced that all Just Eat workers would be entitled to minimum pay, sick pay and paid holiday, rather than being classed as gig workers. When Uber CEO Dara Khosrowshahi criticized Groen for focusing his attention on his company's share price, he retorted: "Start paying taxes, minimum wage and social security premiums before giving a founder advice on how he should run his business." In 2023 it was announced that the company would return to an entirely self-employed gig worker model in Britain, a decision impacting around 1,870 workers who were given six weeks notice that they would no longer be employed on full contracts.

In late 2024, Groen oversaw the divestment of the company's US subsidiary, Grubhub, selling it to Wonder Group at a significant loss to streamline operations. Shortly thereafter, the company delisted from the London Stock Exchange to focus on its listing in Amsterdam.

In 2025, following the acquisition of Just Eat Takeaway by the investment group Prosus for €4.1 billion, Groen announced his departure from the company. In December 2025, confirmed he would step down as CEO on 1 January 2026, concluding a 25-year tenure at the company he founded in his student dormitory. He is set to be succeeded by Roberto Gandolfo.

As of October 2021, his net worth was estimated at US$1.2 billion, dropping to US$350 million by mid-2022 amid the post-pandemic tech slump. However, holding an 11.3% stake in the combined entity, Groen stood to benefit significantly from the all-cash acquisition by Prosus in October 2025.

== Personal life ==
Groen lives in the Netherlands. In 2017, he bought a 9 bedroom house in Noordwijk that had had a guide price of €10.25 million. His hobby is flying and he has a pilot licence. Few details about Groen's personal life are publicly known.
