= SkipTheDishes =

Canadian online food delivery service

SkipTheDishes Restaurant Services
- Type: Subsidiary
- Industry: Online food ordering
- Founded: 2012; 14 years ago
- Founders: Josh Simair; Jeff Adamson; Dan Simair; Chris Simair; Andrew Chau
- Headquarters: Winnipeg, Manitoba, Canada
- Area served: Canada
- Key people: Paul Burns (CEO); Geoff Ryan (CPO)
- Revenue: ▲ Can$581.9 million (2020) ▲ Can$312 million (2018)
- Number of employees: 2,000
- Parent: Just Eat (2016–2020); Just Eat Takeaway (2020–present)
- Website: skipthedishes.com

SkipTheDishes Restaurant Services Inc, branded as Skip, is a Canadian online food delivery service headquartered in Winnipeg, Manitoba and a division of Dutch-based Just Eat Takeaway.com. Users can order food from restaurants online using its iOS or Android app or through a web browser. Users also can provide feedback by reviewing restaurants after receiving an order. Skip was founded in 2012 in Saskatoon, and purchased by UK-based Just Eat in 2016, later becoming Just Eat Takeaway.com after a merger in 2020, in which Skip adopted Takeaway.com's orange branding and logo.

== History ==
SkipTheDishes was founded in 2012 by brothers Josh and Chris Simair, with the idea of creating a more efficient online food ordering and delivery network. Josh had previously worked as an investment banker in London and recognized the opportunity to improve the food delivery process. The company was initially launched in Saskatoon and later moved to Winnipeg, where the head office was established.

The co-founders bootstrapped the company and secured seed capital from angel investors, followed by additional funding from private investors and four venture capital firms. Three more co-founders, including another brother and two university friends, joined between 2012 and 2014 to help grow the business. When Skip was acquired four years later by the United Kingdom-based Just Eat, co-founders Chris Simair and Andrew Chau left.

=== Acquisition and growth ===
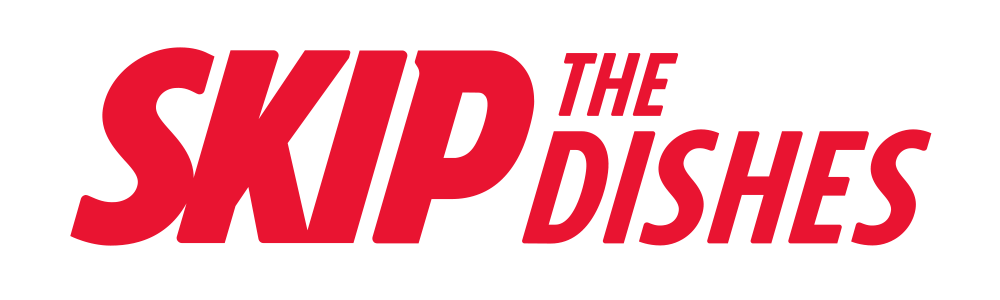
Logo used between 2018 and 2020

As the company scaled between 2013 and 2016, the co-founders launched SkipTheDishes in many Canadian cities, initially focusing on mid-market cities, including Burnaby, Vancouver, Calgary, Edmonton, Red Deer, Prince Albert, Grande Prairie, Regina, Saskatoon, Winnipeg, Mississauga, Toronto, Kitchener/Waterloo, and Ottawa; as well as US cities, including Columbus, Cleveland, Cincinnati, Buffalo, Omaha, and St. Louis.

In December 2016, SkipTheDishes was acquired by Just Eat for $200 million. SkipTheDishes remained a subsidiary and separate brand from Just Eat, with its headquarters remaining in Winnipeg. As of September 2018, Just Eat Canada redirects to SkipTheDishes.

As recognition of his work in business, Skip's company founder Josh Simair was chosen as one of Canada's Top 40 Under 40. Just Eat's CEO, Peter Plumb, reported significant increases in the company's Q3-2017 revenue, due to "strong growth in order numbers and the inclusion of SkipTheDishes business."

To diversify its business, in 2017, SkipTheDishes announced that it was experimenting with alcohol delivery in Winnipeg, Manitoba, with plans to expand nationwide.

Logo used from 2020 to 2024, aligned with the unified Just Eat Takeaway branding

In March 2019, SkipTheDishes pulled out of the United States market. Their business and drivers were transferred to Grubhub. In early 2020, Just Eat merged with Netherlands-based competitor Takeaway.com, forming Just Eat Takeaway, shortly thereafter announcing a deal to acquire its American competitor Grubhub (who previously acquired SkipTheDishes' American operations). In July 2020, in line with Just Eat's other markets, SkipTheDishes adopted Takeaway.com's branding and orange colour scheme, though keeping the SkipTheDishes name.

=== Expansion and rebranding ===
In late 2021, SkipTheDishes began testing a new offering called Skip Express Lane, a service that delivers household goods and groceries directly to customers. The service is located in Winnipeg and in London, Ontario.

In 2024, SkipTheDishes' CEO, Paul Burns, announced on LinkedIn the layoff of 800 employees, including 700 Canada-based employees at Just Eat Takeaway.com, SkipTheDishes' parent company, during restructuring efforts. In October 2024, SkipTheDishes announced it was shortening its name to Skip, during a brand re-fresh to reflect on its expanded offerings beyond food delivery, including groceries, convenience items, and retail goods.

=== Marketing ===
In October 2018, SkipTheDishes ran ads featuring actor Jon Hamm, presenting him with the moniker of "honorary Canadian." In 2024, Hamm returned to star in a new ad campaign to help Skip update its messaging and showcase its expanded offerings.

Since 2019, SkipTheDishes has run a series of French-language ads, notably in Quebec, featuring comedian Patrick Groulx. His ads since October 2020 and early 2021 have focused on promoting "les Récompenses SKIP" or Skip's loyalty points program.

In February 2020, SkipTheDishes entered into a multiyear marketing relationship with the Toronto Defiant, an esports team in the Overwatch League.

In summer 2021, ahead of the 2020 Olympic Games, SkipTheDishes was named the "Official Food Delivery App" of the Canadian Olympic Committee.

== Criticism ==
Like many companies involved in the sharing economy, SkipTheDishes has received criticism for its business practices. In March 2017, the company received negative publicity for its responses to a job candidate's question about compensation and benefits. As a follow-up to the incident, Emily Norgang of the Canadian Labour Congress stated that "the most innovative aspect isn't the technology itself, but actually the expansion of this exploitative business model." As of October 2021, SkipTheDishes has the lowest rating of F from the Better Business Bureau due to volume of unresolved complaints.
