= MasterChef Confeitaria season 1 =

MasterChef Confeitaria
- Season 1
- Presented by: Ana Paula Padrão
- Judges: Érick Jacquin; Helena Rizzo; Henrique Fogaça; Diego Lozano
- No. of contestants: 12
- Winner: Cesar
- Runner-up: Luísa
- No. of episodes: 10

Release
- Original network: Band
- Original release: November 19 – December 19, 2024

Season chronology
- ← Previous; Debut Next → Season 2

The first season of the Brazilian competitive reality television series MasterChef Confeitaria premiered on November 19, 2024, at 10:30 p.m. on Band.

Ana Paula Padrão served as the main host, while Érick Jacquin, Helena Rizzo and Henrique Fogaça were the judges. Diego Lozano made his debut as a judge in this version.

The grand prize included R$300.000 in cash, a special cookware set by Royal Prestige, R$50.000 worth of products from Camicado, a kitchen from Brastemp's Eclipse Collection line and the MasterChef Confeitaria trophy.

Baker Cesar Yukio won the competition over baker Luísa Jungblut on December 19, 2024.

== Contestants ==
=== Top 12 ===
| Contestant | Age | Hometown | Result | Winnings | Finish |
|---|---|---|---|---|---|
| Cesar Yukio | 35 | São Paulo | Winner on December 19 | 6 | 1st |
| Luísa Jungblut | 34 | Porto Alegre | Runner-up on December 19 | 4 | 2nd |
| Walkyria Fagundes | 34 | São Paulo | Eliminated on December 17 | 4 | 3rd |
| Wellington "Well" Teixeira | 28 | Fortaleza | Eliminated on December 17 | 3 | 3rd |
| Matheus Rosa | 27 | Campos dos Goytacazes | Eliminated on December 12 | 3 | 5th |
| Rodrigo "Digo" Ribeiro | 32 | Osasco | Eliminated on December 10 | 1 | 6th |
| Patrick Cavegn | 28 | São Gonçalo | Eliminated on December 5 | 3 | 7th |
| Juliete Soulé | 32 | São Paulo | Eliminated on December 3 | 2 | 8th |
| Maria Eugênia Sanches | 26 | Poços de Caldas | Eliminated on November 28 | 1 | 9th |
| Ale Sotero | 35 | São Paulo | Eliminated on November 26 | 0 | 10th |
| Marina "Sá Marina" Mendes | 40 | Vitória da Conquista | Eliminated on November 21 | 0 | 11th |
| Verônica Kim | 34 | São Paulo | Eliminated on November 19 | 0 | 12th |

== Elimination table ==
| Place | Contestant | Episode | | | | | | | | | | | | | | | | |
| Place | Contestant | 1 | | 2 | | 3 | 4 | | 5 | 6 | | 7 | | 8 | | 9 | | 10 |
|---|---|---|---|---|---|---|---|---|---|---|---|---|---|---|---|---|---|---|
| 1 | Cesar | LOW | WIN | WIN | IMM | HIGH | IN | HIGH | WIN | WIN | IMM | LOW | LOW | LOW | WIN | HIGH | WIN | WINNER |
| 2 | Luísa | HIGH | IMM | WIN | IMM | LOW | HIGH | IMM | PT | WIN | IMM | IN | WIN | LOW | LOW | WIN | IMM | RUNNER-UP |
| 3 | Walkyria | LOW | LOW | HIGH | IMM | WIN | IN | IMM | WIN | WIN | IMM | IN | LOW | WIN | IMM | HIGH | ELIM | |
| 3 | Well | IN | IMM | HIGH | IMM | WIN | WIN | IMM | WIN | HIGH | LOW | HIGH | IMM | LOW | LOW | HIGH | ELIM | |
| 5 | Matheus | HIGH | IMM | HIGH | IMM | WIN | HIGH | IMM | WIN | LOW | LOW | WIN | IMM | LOW | ELIM | | | |
| 6 | Digo | LOW | LOW | HIGH | IMM | LOW | HIGH | IMM | WIN | HIGH | LOW | LOW | ELIM | | | | | |
| 7 | Patrick | WIN | IMM | LOW | LOW | WIN | LOW | WIN | LOW | LOW | ELIM | | | | | | | |
| 8 | Juliete | HIGH | IMM | LOW | WIN | WIN | LOW | LOW | ELIM | | | | | | | | | |
| 9 | Maria Eugênia | LOW | HIGH | LOW | HIGH | WIN | LOW | ELIM | | | | | | | | | | |
| 10 | Ale | HIGH | IMM | HIGH | IMM | ELIM | | | | | | | | | | | | |
| 11 | Sá Marina | LOW | HIGH | LOW | ELIM | | | | | | | | | | | | | |
| 12 | Kim | IN | ELIM | | | | | | | | | | | | | | | |

Key

- The baker won MasterChef Confeitaria.
- The baker was the runner-up.
- The baker won the individual challenge (Mystery Box or Elimination Test).
- The baker was one of the top entries in the individual challenge but did not win.
- The baker did not have to compete in that round and was safe from elimination.
- The baker was not selected as a top or bottom entry in an individual challenge.
- The baker was one of the bottom entries in the Mystery Box and received a disadvantaged in the Elimination Test.
- The baker was on the winning team in the Team Challenge.
- The baker was on the losing team in the Team Challenge.
- The baker was one of the bottom entries in an individual challenge but was saved first.
- The baker was one of the bottom entries in an individual challenge but was saved last.
- The baker won the Reinstation Challenge and returned to the competition.
- The baker was not eligible to compete in that round.
- The baker had to withdraw from the competition.
- The baker was eliminated from MasterChef Confeitaria.

== Ratings and reception ==
=== Brazilian ratings ===
All numbers are in points and provided by Kantar Ibope Media.

| Episode | Title | Air date | Timeslot (BRT) | SP viewers (in points) | Ref. |
|---|---|---|---|---|---|
| 1 | Top 12 | November 19, 2024 | Tuesday 10:30 p.m. | 1.2 | |
| 2 | Top 11 | November 21, 2024 | Thursday 10:30 p.m. | 1.4 | |
| 3 | Top 10 | November 26, 2024 | Tuesday 10:30 p.m. | 1.3 | |
| 4 | Top 9 | November 28, 2024 | Thursday 10:30 p.m. | 1.5 | |
| 5 | Top 8 | December 3, 2024 | Tuesday 10:30 p.m. | 1.3 | |
| 6 | Top 7 | December 5, 2024 | Thursday 10:30 p.m. | 1.5 | |
| 7 | Top 6 | December 10, 2024 | Tuesday 10:30 p.m. | 1.6 | |
| 8 | Top 5 | December 12, 2024 | Thursday 10:30 p.m. | 1.4 | |
| 9 | Top 4 | December 17, 2024 | Tuesday 10:30 p.m. | 1.5 | |
| 10 | Winner announced | December 19, 2024 | Thursday 10:30 p.m. | 1.0 | |

- In 2024, each point represents 253.273 households in 15 market cities in Brazil (73.279 households in São Paulo).
