= Peter Plumb =

English businessman

Peter James Plumb (born 26 November 1963) was chief executive officer from 2009 to 2016 of Moneysupermarket.com Group plc, a company listed on the London Stock Exchange.

Between September 2017 and January 2019, he served as chief executive officer at Just Eat plc.
