= La Nevera Roja =

Spanish online food delivery platform

La Nevera Roja was a Spanish e-commerce company founded in 2011 in Madrid by Iñigo Juantegui and José del Barrio. Present in more than 600 Spanish cities, La Nevera Roja had 7,000 associated restaurants and 30 types of food from all continents, with the possibility of home delivery or pickup at the restaurant itself.

The platform acted as an intermediary between home-delivery consumers, who could order online via the website or mobile app, between restaurants in their area, choosing between online or cash payment methods, and the entire network of restaurants associated with La Nevera Roja.

== Integration by Global Online Takeaway Group ==
La Nevera Roja was acquired in February 2015 by the holding company Rocket Internet Group, becoming part of the Global Online Takeaway Group. The Global Online Takeaway Group is an international conglomerate in the food delivery sector. It operates in more than 64 countries under different brands such as Foodpanda in Asia, Hellofood in South America and Italy, and La Nevera Roja in Spain. Following the acquisition Iñigo Amoribieta was appointed CEO3 and the two co-founders of the startup left the company to focus on new projects.

== Final sale to Just Eat ==
After looking at La Nevera Roja's financials, Rocket Internet discovered that sales were high, but largely due to marketing campaigns using coupons and discount codes. When the strategy was changed and the juicy discount coupons, which offered savings of up to 50%, were removed, sales dropped dramatically and the German accelerator decided to sell it in April 2016 to Just Eat, along with PizzaBo, Hellofood Brazil and Hellofood Mexico, its counterparts in their respective countries, for a total of €125 million.
