= Just Eat Takeaway =

Online food ordering company

Just Eat Takeaway.com NV
- Formerly: Thuisbezorgd.nl N.V. (2000–11); Takeaway.com N.V. (2011–20)
- Type: Subsidiary
- Industry: Online food ordering
- Founded: 2000; 26 years ago (as Takeaway.com); 23 April 2020; 6 years ago (as Just Eat Takeaway)
- Founder: Jitse Groen
- Headquarters: Amsterdam, Netherlands
- Area served: Netherlands, United Kingdom, Germany, Canada, Austria, Belgium, Bulgaria, Denmark, Ireland, Israel, Italy, Luxembourg, Australia, Poland, Slovakia, Spain, Switzerland
- Key people: Fabricio Bloisi (Chairman); Jitse Groen (CEO until Jan 2026); Roberto Gandolfo (CEO designate)
- Brands: Just Eat, Takeaway.com, Lieferando, Thuisbezorgd.nl, Menulog, Skip, 10bis, Pyszne.pl, Bistro.sk
- Revenue: ▲€4,495 million (2021)
- Operating income: ▼€(939) million (2021)
- Net income: ▼€(1,044) million (2021)
- Parent: Prosus
- Website: justeattakeaway.com

Logo used for the company's various brands

Just Eat Takeaway.com N.V. (formerly Takeaway.com; (Note: Takeaway.com is still used as a brand name in some countries, it was the legal name for the company until 2020.) founded as Thuisbezorgd.nl) (Note: Thuisbezorgd.nl is still used as the brand name in the Netherlands.) is a Dutch multinational online food ordering and delivery company.

It is the parent company of food delivery brands including Takeaway.com, Lieferando, Thuisbezorgd.nl, Pyszne.pl, 10bis in Israel, and those acquired from Just Eat, including SkipTheDishes and Menulog. The firm operate various food ordering and delivery platforms in twenty countries, where customers can order food online from restaurants' menus, and have it delivered by restaurant or company couriers directly to their home or workplace using an app or website.

Following clearance by the United Kingdom's Competition and Markets Authority on 23 April 2020, Takeaway.com merged with UK-based food delivery service Just Eat, with Takeaway.com acquiring all of Just Eat's shares.

The company was listed on the London Stock Exchange until November 2024, and on Euronext Amsterdam until 17 November 2025. In October 2025, it was acquired by the investment firm Prosus. In late 2025, it was announced that founder Jitse Groen would step down as CEO, to be succeeded by former iFood Marketplace CEO Roberto Gandolfo.

== History ==
=== Founding and development ===
Takeaway.com was created by Jitse Groen in 2000 after he had a difficult time ordering food online from local restaurants. Initially, Groen wanted to deliver all kinds of consumer goods; however, he noticed that food deliveries were subject to the most demand, and decided to make this the company's primary focus.

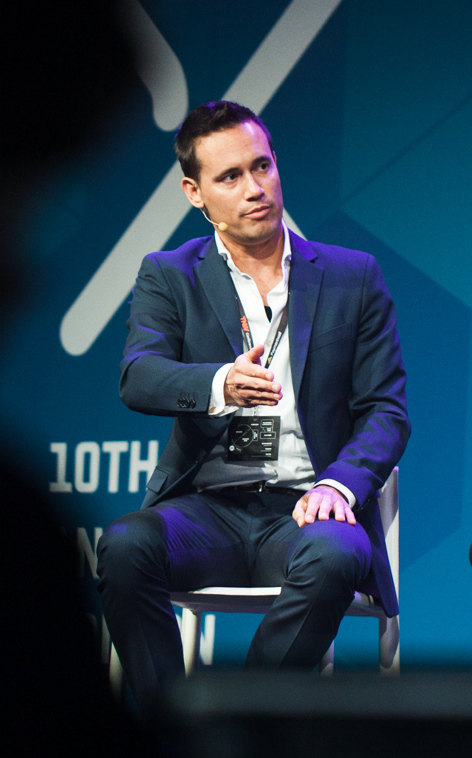
Jitse Groen, 2015

In 2002, co-founder Ruben Eilander left Takeaway because the business was growing too slowly. According to Groen, in these early years, he was relying on his student loans to keep himself financially afloat. Thanks to broadband internet becoming mainstream around 2003, the business started growing, and Groen left his studies to focus on the company.

The company benefited from an investment of €13 million (US$16.7 million) from Prime Ventures—a venture capital and growth equity firm—in 2012. It began accepting Bitcoin in November 2013 and benefited from another investment of €74 million (US$98.31 million) in a series B-round led by Macquarie Capital and Prime Ventures in 2014. It also launched a new logo in all of the countries where it operated. It then raised €328 million (US$363.06 million) from an IPO, valuing the company at €993 million (US$1.1 billion), in 2016. In August that year, it stopped doing business in the UK, selling its customer portfolio to rival Just Eat.

On 23 October 2013, Takeaway.com announced the acquisition of Vietnammm.com, then one of Vietnam’s online food-ordering platforms founded in 2011 with service in Ho Chi Minh City and Hanoi.

In 2017, in Belgium, local provider, Pizza.be, was rebranded Takeaway.com. In 2018, the company increased the commission it charged for using the platform from 12% to 13%. In the same year, Takeaway.com acquired Israeli food delivery company 10bis (Hebrew: תן ביס) for €135 million (US$149.43 million), as well as local Bulgarian startup BGmenu.com, including its Romanian subsidiary Oliviera.ro; and in 2019 it acquired Lieferheld, Pizza.de, and Foodora from Delivery Hero in Germany.

Takeaway.com agreed on 1 February 2019 to sell its interest in Takeaway.com Asia (Vietnammm.com) to Woowa Brothers, with completion on 15 February 2019.

In July 2019, Takeaway.com announced proposals to take over Just Eat. In January 2020, 80.4% of Just Eat shareholders approved Takeaway.com's acquisition deal. Although Just Eat became a subsidiary of Takeaway.com on 3 February 2020, the British Competition and Markets Authority ordered on the following day that no integration should take place and that the brands should be kept separate until their investigation is completed. On 23 April 2020, the Competition and Markets Authority announced that it was unconditionally approving Just Eat's merger with Takeaway.com.

In June 2020, the company announced that it would acquire, in an all-stock transaction, US-based Grubhub—valuing the deal at $7.3 billion.

The company was reported to be in talks with Prosus to sell its 33% stake, inherited from Just Eat, in Brazilian food delivery company iFood, which operated in Brazil and Colombia, in July 2020. It completed the sale of its stake in iFood to Prosus for €1.8 billion in August 2022.

The firm became the sponsors of the UEFA men's club and women's competitions on 22 March 2021, after being awarded the first-ever sponsorship contract for the UEFA Euro 2020.

In July 2021, the company announced it would acquire Slovak market leader Bistro.sk; the acquisition was completed in October. The company withdrew from operations in Norway and Portugal in April 2022, and discontinued its operations in Romania in June 2022.

In April 2022, following investor pressure, the company announced it was considering a full or partial sale of Grubhub. It confirmed the sale of Grubhub to restaurant chain Wonder Group Inc for $650m in November 2024.

=== 2024–present: Sale of Grubhub and acquisition by Prosus ===
In November 2024, the company announced it would delist its shares from the London Stock Exchange, citing low liquidity and the administrative burden, leaving Euronext Amsterdam as its sole trading venue prior to its acquisition. In the same month, the company confirmed the sale of its US subsidiary Grubhub to Wonder Group Inc. for $650 million, accepting a significant loss compared to the $7.3 billion acquisition price in 2021.

In February 2025, the investment group Prosus announced a bid to acquire Just Eat Takeaway for €4.1 billion. Prosus, which already held stakes in contemporaries like Delivery Hero and Swiggy, stated the move was to consolidate its position in the food delivery sector. The transaction was completed in October 2025, ending Just Eat Takeaway's time as an independent public company.

Following the takeover, the company announced a major leadership transition. Founder Jitse Groen, who had led the company since its inception in 2000, announced he would step down as CEO effective 1 January 2026. He is to be succeeded by Roberto Gandolfo, a former executive at iFood and Prosus Europe. Additionally, Prosus CEO Fabricio Bloisi was appointed as the new chair of the supervisory board.

In August 2026, the company announced its intention to cease operations in Bulgaria, with effect from 15 September 2026.

== Operations ==
The company operates under different brand names in different countries.

Current operations of Just Eat Takeaway
Country	Brand	Website	Former brand/website
Austria	Lieferando	lieferando.at	lieferservice.at
Belgium	Takeaway.com	takeaway.com/be	pizza.be
Canada	Skip	skipthedishes.com	Just Eat Canada; YummyWeb; GrubCanada; OrderIt.ca
Germany	Lieferando	lieferando.de	pizza.de foodora.de lieferservice.de lieferheld.de
Ireland	Just Eat	just-eat.ie	
Israel	10bis	10bis.co.il	
Italy	Just Eat	justeat.it	
Luxembourg	Takeaway.com	takeaway.com/lu	pizza.lu
Netherlands	Thuisbezorgd	Thuisbezorgd.nl	
Poland	Pyszne.pl		
Slovakia	bistro.sk		
Spain	Just Eat	just-eat.es	
Switzerland	Just Eat	just-eat.ch	lieferservice.ch takeaway.com/ch eat.ch
United Kingdom	Just Eat	just-eat.co.uk	

Former operations of Just Eat Takeaway and its predecessors
Country	Brand(s)	Owner(s)	Website
Australia	Menulog	Menulog (2006–2015); Just Eat (2015–2020); Just Eat Takeaway (2020–2025)	menulog.com.au
Bulgaria	Takeaway.com; Formerly BGmenu.com	Takeaway.com (2018–2020); Just Eat Takeaway (2020–2026)	takeaway.com/bg
Denmark	Just Eat	Just Eat (2001–2020); Just Eat Takeaway (2020–2026)	just-eat.dk
France	Just Eat	Just Eat (2018–2020); Just Eat Takeaway (2020–2024)	just-eat.fr
New Zealand	Menulog	Menulog (2012–2015); Just Eat (2015–2020); Just Eat Takeaway (2020–2024)	menulog.co.nz
Norway	Just Eat	Just Eat (2010–2020); Just Eat Takeaway (2020–2022)	just-eat.no
Portugal	Takeaway.com	Takeaway.com (2018–2020); Just Eat Takeaway (2020–2022)	takeaway.com/pt
Romania	Takeaway.com; Formerly oliviera.ro.	Takeaway.com (2018–2020); Just Eat Takeaway (2020–2022)	takeaway.com/ro
United States	Grubhub (sold to Wonder Group)	Just Eat Takeaway (2021–2025)	grubhub.com
United States	Seamless (by Grubhub) (sold to Wonder Group)	Just Eat Takeaway (2021–2025)	seamless.com
Vietnam	Vietnammm	Takeaway.com (2013–2019)	vietnammm.com

== See also ==
- List of websites about food and drink
