= Despegar =

Online travel company

Despegar.com Corp.
- Type: Private
- Industry: Travel agency
- Founded: 1999; 27 years ago
- Founder: Roberto Souviron
- Headquarters: Buenos Aires, Argentina
- Area served: Latin America
- Key people: Gonzalo García Estebarena (CEO and President)
- Revenue: ▲US$774.1 million (2024)
- Operating income: ▲US$123.1 million (2024)
- Net income: ▲US$27.8 million (2024)
- Total assets: ▲US$904.7 million (2024)
- Owner: Prosus
- Number of employees: 3,956 (2024)
- Parent: Naspers
- Website: www.us.despegar.co

Despegar.com Corp. (Despegar) is an online travel company based in Buenos Aires, Argentina. It was founded in 1999 and operates a booking platform for airline tickets, hotels, package tours, and other travel products in Latin America.

Listed on the New York Stock Exchange (NYSE) since 2017, Despegar is considered one of the largest online travel portals in the region and is active in 19 markets in the region. In 2025, Prosus completed the purchase of the Argentinian firm.

== History ==
Despegar.com was founded in 1999 by Roberto Souviron, a former student at Duke University. In the years that followed, the company expanded rapidly from Argentina into other Latin American markets. Starting in 2009, it integrated hotel bookings into its platforms alongside flight bookings.

After going public on the NYSE in 2017, the firm acquired several regional travel providers. In 2019, the company acquired the company Viajes Falabella (the booking portal of the Falabella retail group in Chile, Colombia, Peru, and Argentina) for around US$27 million.

In January 2020, the Mexican Best Day Travel Group (one of Mexico's largest travel agencies) was acquired for over US$130 million. Also in 2020, Despegar acquired Brazilian fintech company Koin, which specializes in “buy now, pay later” payments. At the beginning of 2022, the acquisition of 100% of Viajanet, a large Brazilian online travel agency, was announced (purchase price approx. US$15 million).

In December 2024, Dutch investment company Prosus, a subsidiary of South African group Naspers, agreed to purchase Despegar at a price of $19.5 per share (a total of approximately US$1.7 billion). The transaction was completed in May 2025, meaning that Despegar will now function as a subsidiary of Prosus.

== Operations ==
Despegar operates an online platform through which consumers can book flights, hotels, package tours, and other tourism services. The offering is provided via websites and mobile apps. The business is essentially divided into three segments: airline ticket sales (“Air”) and other travel products, including package tours, hotels, rental cars, bus tickets, cruises, insurance, and other services at the destination. There is also a financial services division. Users can search for and compare travel offers and book them directly online via the one-stop marketplace.

Despegar operates in around 20 countries in Latin America and markets its services under the brands Despegar (global) and Decolar (Brazil). In addition to its end customer business (B2C), Despegar also offers white label solutions in the B2B sector, e.g. for banks, airlines, and retailers. The company has an AI assistant called Sofia.
