= IFood =

Brazilian food delivery platform

iFood
- Type: Privately held company
- Founded: May 2011, 15; 15 years ago 14 years ago
- Founder: Eduardo Baer; Felipe Ramos Fioravante; Gabriel Pinto; Guilherme Bonifacio; Michel Eberhardt; Patrick Sigrist
- Headquarters: São Paulo, Brazil
- Revenue: ▲ R$208,000,000 (2019)
- Owner: Movile, part of Prosus (Naspers)
- Number of employees: ▲5,539 (April 2021)
- Website: www.ifood.com.br (Brazil)

iFood is a Brazilian online food ordering and food delivery platform, currently operating in Brazil and previously in Colombia. The company holds over 80% market share of the food delivery sector in Brazil. It is owned by Dutch-based Prosus (part of Naspers) and its Brazilian investment firm Movile.

It merged its businesses in Argentina and Colombia with rivals PedidosYa in August 2018 and Domicilios.com in March 2021 respectively, brands of Delivery Hero which is also owned by Prosus. It operated as SinDelantal in Mexico until December 2020.

Currently, iFood holds 83% of the meal delivery market in Brazil and is the subject of proceedings by CADE. A survey by the Brazilian Association of Bars and Restaurants (ABRASEL) pointed out that orders made by the platform are on average 17.5% more expensive for the consumer, compared to the same order made directly at the restaurant.

== History ==
iFood was founded in 2011 by Patrick Sigrist, Guilherme Bonifacio, Eduardo Baer and Felipe Fioravante. Movile owns iFood as a subsidiary, with Just Eat owning a 33% stake in iFood until 2022. Naspers provided funding when iFood had just started.

It serves customers in Brazil and Mexico. It connected 15,000 restaurants to customers who collectively placed four million orders every month in 2018. iFood had £123.8m in sales, making it 16 times larger than the next largest delivery company in the region in 2018. iFood has 80% of the market share in Brazil of food deliveries and according to the book Business Despite Borders, "iFood became a synonym of food delivery in Brazil."

In August 2018, PedidosYa acquired the Argentinian business. In March 2021, the merger of the Colombian subsidiary with PedidosYa was approved.

In September, it acquired the São Paulo startup SiteMercado, an e-commerce platform focused on markets and grocery stores which it has partnered with since 2019.

On 19 August 2022, Just Eat Takeaway.com sold its 33% stake in iFood to Prosus for €1.8 billion. This follows years of talks of Just Eat Takeaway selling their share in the company since 2020.

On 21 November 2022 iFood ended operations in Colombia, the decision was a business strategy due to the moment in the capital market.

iFood broke sales records during the FIFA World Cup in Qatar, where more than 8 million orders were placed on the app over the weekend of December 2-4, the best mark in 2022. Thus, the first weekend of December not only had the most orders in 2022, but also surpassed the weekends of 2021.
