= Menulog =

Defunct Australian and New Zealand online food ordering app

Menulog Pty. Ltd.
- Type: Subsidiary
- Industry: Online food ordering
- Founded: 2006; 20 years ago
- Founders: Dan Katz; Leon Kamenev; Kevin Sherman
- Defunct: 26 November 2025; 11 months ago
- Headquarters: Sydney, New South Wales, Australia
- Key people: Morten Belling (managing director)
- Parent: Just Eat (2015–2020); Just Eat Takeaway.com (2020–2025)
- Website: menulog.com.au

Menulog Pty. Ltd. (branded as simply Menulog) was an Australian online food and beverage ordering app and delivery service platform, founded in Sydney in 2006 and headquartered there. In 2015, it was bought by UK-based Just Eat, which was subsequently folded into Dutch-based Just Eat Takeaway.com in 2020, following that company's acquisition of Just Eat.

Its main competitors in Australia were the United States-based food delivery platforms Uber Eats and DoorDash. At its peak, Menulog worked with more than 30,000 restaurant partners across Australia and New Zealand and operated its own courier network.

The service exited the New Zealand market in May 2024 and ceased operations in Australia on 26 November 2025; as part of its closure, Menulog entered into a commercial agreement with Uber Eats under which customers, restaurants and couriers were redirected and offered incentives to migrate to the Uber Eats platform.

== Restaurant partners ==
Menulog included international franchises like McDonald's, KFC, Pizza Hut, Subway, Nando's and the local Burger King franchise, being Hungry Jack's. National franchises include Red Rooster, Pizza Capers and Oporto, and also state and localised suburban restaurants offering more than 130 cuisines. Menulog operated in all major Australian states and cities.

== History ==
Menulog was founded in Sydney by Dan Katz, Leon Kamenev and Kevin Sherman in 2006. In 2007, the same year Menulog launched its first in-store ordering device, the business expanded to Australian cities Brisbane, Canberra and Melbourne. The following year, Menulog launched in Adelaide and Perth and expanded its reach further launching in New Zealand in 2012.

In 2009, Menulog launched its first iOS app and its first Android app in 2011.

By July 2014, the company had handled over 22 million meal orders. In February 2015, Menulog and EatNow announced their agreement to merge with a 70/30 share split arrangement, forming Menulog Group Limited. In May 2015, the company was bought by Just Eat, which funded the deal by issuing new shares for 855 million Australian dollars.

In 2016, after reaching a ten million annual order milestone, Menulog lost its case against Pizza Fellas who successfully obtained interlocutory relief in the Victorian Civil and Administrative Tribunal (VCAT). The claim was brought by the Pizza Fellas Group who were granted injunctive relief to restrain Menulog from purchasing Google Adwords using Pizza Fellas' brandnames. Menulog's conduct, known as brandjacking had the effect of redirecting Pizza Fellas' customers to the Menulog website (so they could resell them back to the applicant Pizza Fellas).

The group rebranded with a new logo and saw the appointment of former Groupon CEO Alistair Venn as managing director.

In 2019, Menulog's British parent company, Just Eat, agreed to merge with Amsterdam-based rival Takeaway.com in an £8.2 billion deal. Menulog is now a subsidiary of the combined corporation, Just Eat Takeaway.com.

By mid-2020, in the middle of the COVID-19 pandemic where demand for services delivering food from restaurants and takeaways surged, Menulog announced it had received "a high volume" of requests to join its platform. The company said they had also implemented a range of measures to support both their drivers and restaurants on their platform, such as offering contactless delivery, and halved all commission on pickup orders until further notice.

In May 2024, Menulog ceased operations in New Zealand.

In November 2025, Menulog ceased operations in Australia. Just Eat Takeaway.com said Menulog had been "navigating challenging circumstances" and that the decision would allow it to focus on other markets.

== TV advertisements ==
The company became well-known for its television advertisements featuring musician Snoop Dogg titled "Did Somebody Say?", in which he raps about ways the customer can use the service, like ordering fried rice on a private jet or having chocolate fondue delivered to their house. Snoop Dogg was paid $US6.2 million for the advertisements.

In May 2022, it was announced that American singer Katy Perry would replace Snoop Dogg in the Just Eat advertisements. Menulog also ran a commercial to the Australian market featuring Gerringong local rap act Big Twisty in 2022.

In October 2023, American rapper Latto and singer Christina Aguilera were introduced in a new promotional advertisement for Menulog, taking over from Perry.

== Recognition and media ==
Menulog's research and insights into Australian food trends are regularly featured in the media, with a 2015 study showing Australia's "hungriest suburbs" published in The Daily Telegraph and The Herald Sun. Menulog's annual Tasty Takeaway awards, which recognise the nation's most popular takeaway restaurants, have appeared on news.com.au.

In October 2016, Menulog created Australia's first 23ct gold pizza in partnership with Pizza Design Co. Parramatta. The event was covered by Sunrise and Nine Kitchen. Menulog was awarded the Canstar Blue Award for Customer Service in 2017.

At the 2017 CEO Magazine 'Executive of the Year' Awards, Menulog's CFO Morten Belling was named CFO of the Year and managing director Alistair Venn was named Runner-up in his respective category.
