= Movile (company) =

Brazilian firm

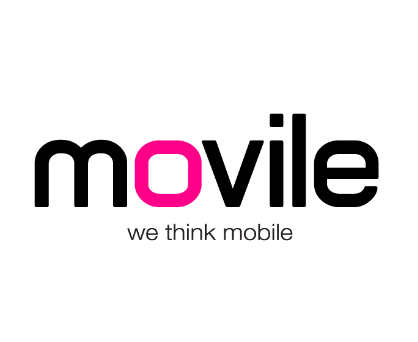
- Type: Private
- Industry: Internet; Computer software Telecoms equipment
- Founded: 1998; 28 years ago
- Founder: Fabricio Bloisi & Eduardo Henrique
- Headquarters: Campinas, SP, Brazil
- Number of employees: 1600
- Website: movile.com

Movile is a local Brazilian firm headquartered in Campinas, Brazil. Movile operates in the segments of food ordering and delivery, ticketing, and logistics. It has had mixed success until recently with the bet on food delivery maturing (iFood) while other bets still at nascent stage or under performing.

== History ==
In 1998, Fabricio Bloisi founded a startup that would later become Brazil's Movile.

In its early stage, Movile focused on innovating and exploring advanced technologies, mobile devices, text messages using the Short Message Service (SMS) standard and the first chat through SMS. In the beginning, the company to enabled ringtone commerce in Brazil, as well as the development of the country's first Wireless Application Protocol (WAP) search portal. Movile was also the first company in Latin America to send images through the Multimedia Messaging Service (MMS) standard.

In 2007, Bloisi focused on expansion. In 2008, and Movile built itself into the largest company in the Latin American mobile commerce industry through merges and acquisitions with companies like Yavox and Cyclelogic establishing a presence in over ten countries with offices in Argentina, Peru, Colombia and Mexico.

In 2012, the team started operations in Silicon Valley.

== Timeline ==
=== 1998–2010: early years ===
Movile was originally named Intraweb and was founded in 1998 by two former Universidade Estadual de Campinas (Unicamp) students, Fabricio Bloisi & Eduardo Henrique, in the city of Campinas. The start-up Intraweb was organized through the University's corporate incubator. The initial purpose was to create corporate Intranets.

In 2001, Intraweb was absorbed by the GoWap website, the first company to receive a capital contribution by Rio Bravo Investimentos. This was the birth of GoWapCorp, a company in the field of corporate market data solutions by mean of cell phones.

In 2002, GoWapCorp was the subject of a capital outlay by 'Rio Bravo' and changed its name to Compera.

During 2003 and 2004, the company changed its business model, shifting from software to service provision. Focus was transferred from the corporate market to concessionaires and end customers, with services such as cell phone video, games and music.

In 2007, Compera merged with nTime, a cell phone service company in Rio de Janeiro, creating ComperanTime. In that same year, the mobile marketing company Movile was acquired.

In 2008, MIH Holdings, from the Naspers South African media group, acquired the interest held by Rio Bravo in ComperanTime. and became the company's minority shareholder.

In 2009, ComperanTime announced its merger with Yavox. Following these discussions, Yavox became ComperanTime's wholly owned subsidiary, but both companies and their respective trade marks were to go on existing separately for several months more.

=== 2010–2014: rebranding and expansion ===
In 2010, following an extended market research period, ComperanTimeYavox decided to change its name to Movile. Jointly with this new trade mark, a change in strategy also took place. Movile's key focus turned to digital inclusion by means of mobile services in emerging countries. During that same year Movile and Cyclelogic announced the merger of their operations in Latin America.

In 2012, Movile opened its first offices in the United States (in Silicon Valley, California) and concentrated its business strategy on that country's Latino market.

By 2013, Movile invested $1.6 million in the startup iFood and broadened the scope and number of orders by creating a smartphone application like PlayKids app release – considered to be the Children's Netflix. Between 2012 and 2013, Movile was part of Brazil's best IT and Telecomm companies to work in. A survey held by the Great Place to Work Institute institute jointly with Computerworld magazine.

2014 marked a big year for expansion. There an additional $2 million investment in iFood. PlayKids arrives in 24 countries: Spain, France, USA, Australia, UK, Canada, among others. Movile's new investment in iFood app leads to the purchase of a competitor Central Delivery. Movile and Accelerator 21212 invest R$1.15 million in Superplayer. Movile raises $55 million (Series D) from Innova Capital, Jorge Paulo Lemann, and FINEP. This new round of financing led to the acquisitions of Rapiddo, ChefTime, and FreshTime with investments in LBS Local (owners of Apontador, MapLink, and Cinepapaya) and TruckPad.

=== 2015–present: growth into a mobile platform ===
2015 started out strong for Movile with a mid-year investment of $40M (Series E) from Naspers and Innova Capital. Movile then invested $50 million into iFood and Just Eat along with a $15 million investment in PlayKids for China and Japan expansion.

In 2016, Rapiddo acquires on-demand courier service 99Motos. PlayKids expands with content from Sesame Street and additional apps—PlayKids Talk, PlayKids Stories and PlayKids Party. iFood purchases San Francisco-based, online food delivery service, SpoonRocket's technology, to expand their reach into additional restaurants in Latin America. Movile invests in Sympla, a 'do it yourself' ticketing platform for events and Sympla acquires Eventik to expand their presence in ticking. Movile then raises an additional $40 million (Series F) from Naspers and Innova Capital.

2017 saw an additional funding round of $53 million (Series G) from Naspers and Innova Capital.

== Offices ==
- Brazil
  - Campinas, SP (headquarters)
  - São Paulo, Sp

== Investors ==
Naspers now Prosus, the global media and e-commerce group, is Movile's largest investor since 2008.
