= Jitse van der Veen =

Dutch swimmer

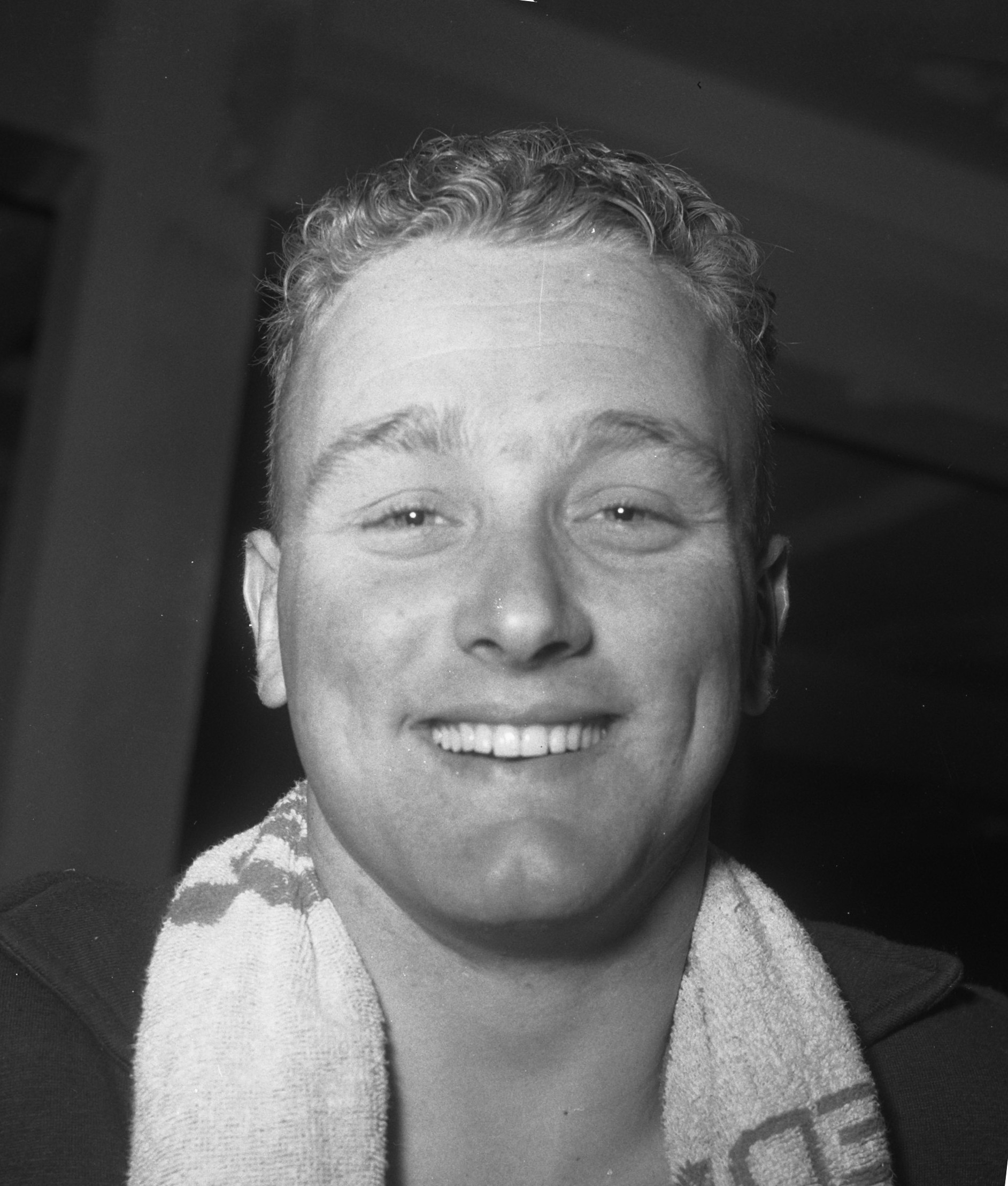
- Jitse van der Veen in 1952

Personal information
- Born: 2 November 1928 Leeuwarden, Netherlands
- Died: 19 September 1976 (aged 47) Leeuwarden, Netherlands

Sport
- Sport: Swimming
- Club: LZO, Leeuwarden

Jitse van der Veen (2 November 1928 – 19 September 1976) was a Dutch swimmer. He competed at the 1952 Summer Olympics in the 100 m backstroke event, but failed to reach the final.
