= Prosus =

Internet investment division of Naspers

Prosus N.V.
- Formerly: Myriad International Holdings
- Type: Public
- Traded as: Euronext Amsterdam: PRX; AEX component
- ISIN: NL0013654783
- Industry: Investments
- Founded: 3 April 1997; 29 years ago
- Founder: Naspers
- Headquarters: Amsterdam, Netherlands
- Area served: Worldwide
- Key people: Koos Bekker (Chairman); Fabricio Bloisi (CEO); Basil Sgourdos (CFO)
- Revenue: ▲$6.17 billion (2025)
- Operating income: ▲$173 million (2025)
- Net income: ▲$12.36 billion (2025)
- Total assets: ▲$72.58 billion (2025)
- Total equity: ▲$51.12 billion (2025)
- Number of employees: 20,882 (2024)
- Parent: Naspers
- Website: prosus.com

Prosus N.V. is a Dutch investment group that invests and operates across sectors and markets with long-term growth potential. It is among the largest technology investors in the world.

Prosus has invested across multiple areas of the technology sector, including social networking, gaming, classifieds, payments, financial technology, educational technology, food delivery, real estate listings, and ecommerce. Products and services of its businesses and investments are used by more than 1.5 billion people in 89 markets.

Prosus majority shareholder is South African multinational mass media company Naspers. In September 2019, Prosus's ordinary shares were listed on Euronext Amsterdam and, as a secondary inward-listing, on the Johannesburg Stock Exchange. Subsequent to its IPO, Prosus became the largest consumer Internet company in Europe by asset value. Shares in the company were reported to have "soared on debut," although the company was trading at a significant discount to the value of its portfolio.

== Business ==
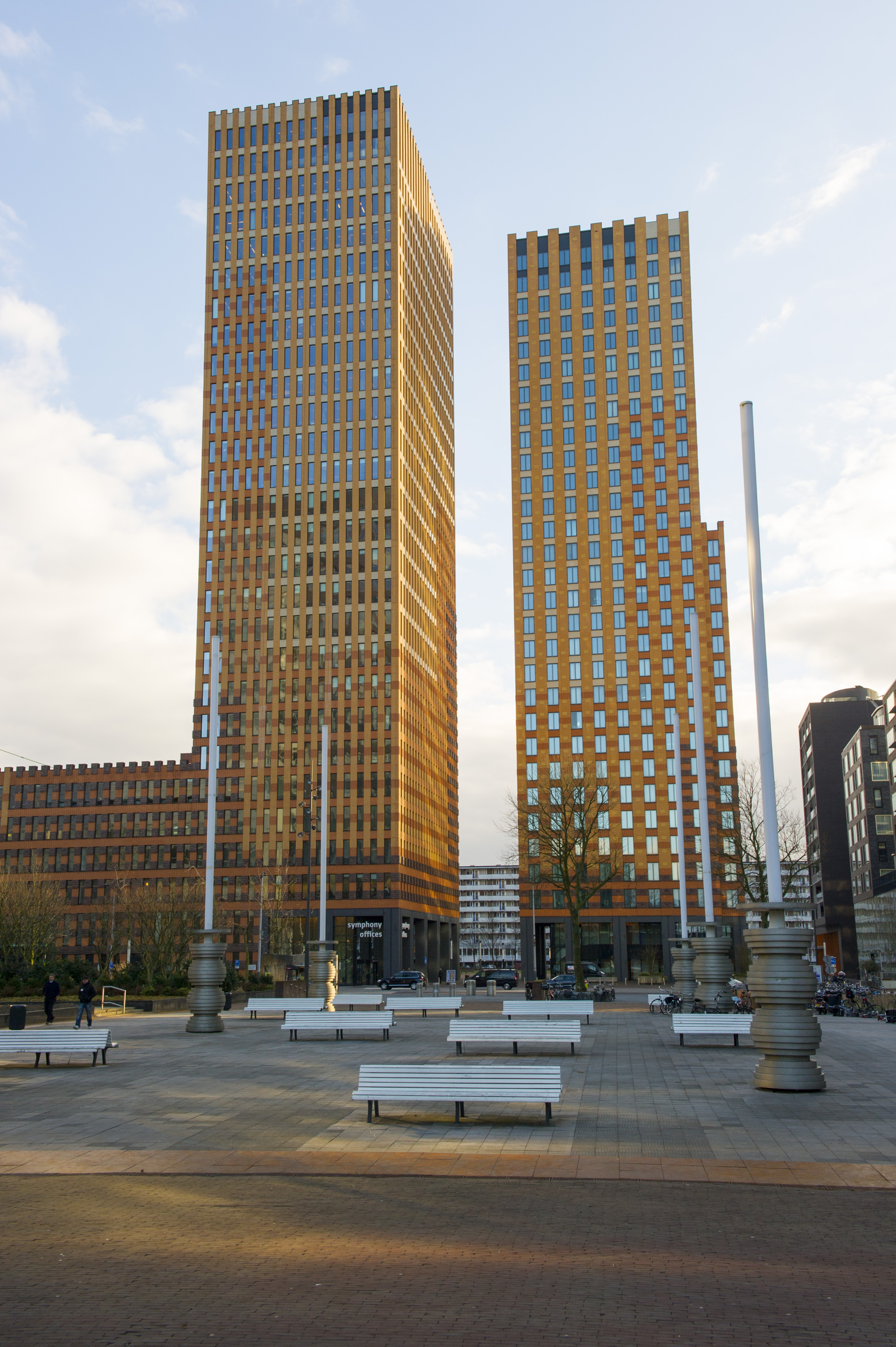
Prosus' head office is located in the Symphony Building in the Zuidas business district in Amsterdam.

The group's expansion into internet platforms began in the 1990s, spanning various tech investments. Selected holdings (percentages shown only where disclosed in current filings) include:

- Social – Tencent (22.996% as of 17 Jul 2025).
- Classifieds – OLX (subsidiary), including brands such as Property24; Prosus/OLX also holds a stake in EMPG (merger of OLX MENA assets with EMPG/dubizzle in 2020).
- Fintech – Majority-owned PayU (retained India/Turkey/SEA and Red Dot Payment; sold the Global Payments Organisation in LatAm & Africa to Rapyd in Mar. 2025), and a minority stake in Remitly (about 12.3% as of Aug. 2025).
- Food delivery – iFood (100%), Delivery Hero (stake; Prosus committed in Aug. 2025 to reduce this holding as part of EU conditions for the JET deal), Swiggy (stake); plus venture investments such as Flink, Foodics, Oda, Sharebite and Facily.
- EdTech – Stack Overflow (wholly owned), GoodHabitz (majority), plus minority stakes in platforms such as Brainly, Udemy, GoStudent, Eruditus, BYJU'S, Platzi, eduMe and SoloLear.
- Ecommerce – eMAG (approx. 80.1%), Meesho, Mensa Brands, PharmEasy, Ula, ElasticRun, merXu, The Good Glamm Group.
- Travel – Despegar (100%; acquired and delisted on 15 May 2025).

Prosus is best known for its early investment in Tencent, dating back to 2001.

In March 2022, Prosus announced it was writing off its 25.9% stake (worth approximately US$700m) in social media company VK after VK's CEO Vladimir Kirienko was put on a U.S. sanctions list.

In December 2024, Prosus agreed to acquire Despegar, a Latin American travel agency, for US$1.7 billion; the transaction closed on 15 May 2025.

On 24 February 2025 the company announced it reached an agreement to acquire Just Eat Takeaway.com for €4.1 billion in cash. In 2019, the company had attempted to acquire the then-independent Just Eat, but lost the bidding war to Takeaway.com. EU approval in August 2025 required Prosus to reduce its Delivery Hero exposure.

=== Former assets ===
- Trip.com Group – fully exited via block trades in Sept.–Oct. 2024.
- Wolt – previous ~2% stake exchanged for DoorDash shares when DoorDash acquired Wolt on 31 May 2022.
- BUX – exited; acquired by ABN AMRO in July 2024.

== Controversy ==
Following the Russian invasion of Ukraine in February 2022, many international companies, particularly Western, pulled out of Russia. Unlike most of its Western competitors, Prosus was slow to announce any disinvestments or scaling back of its operations in Russia. It was criticised in particular with regard to its Avito platform (a subsidiary of OLX), which, among other activities, provided classified advertising services that were used by the Russian army for recruiting purposes. In October 2022, Prosus agreed to sell Avito service to Kismet Capital Group for $2.4 bln.

== Acquisitions ==
No	Acquisition date	Company	Price (USD)	Ref.
1	June 3, 2021	Stack Overflow	$1.8 billion	
2	June 15, 2021	GoodHabitz	$257 million	
3	August 19, 2022	iFood	$1.9 billion	
4	February 24, 2025	Just Eat Takeaway.com	$4.3 billion	
