= Just Eat =

European online food order and delivery service

- Logo used since 2020 merger, incorporating Takeaway.com's orange logo
- Product type: Online food ordering
- Current owner: Just Eat Takeaway.com
- Country: Denmark
- Introduced: 2001; 25 years ago
- Markets: Denmark; Ireland; Israel; Italy; Spain; Switzerland; United Kingdom
- Website: just-eat.ie (IRE); just-eat.it (ITA); just-eat.dk (DEN); just-eat.es (ESP); just-eat.ch (SUI); just-eat.co.uk (GBR); just-eat.co.il/next/ (ISR)

Just Eat is an online food order and delivery platform. It was founded in 2001 in Kolding, Denmark, as a food delivery company, and later headquartered in London, United Kingdom, from 2006 (as Just Eat plc) (Note: This is the legal name of the company prior to its purchase by Takeaway.com. After March 2020 under Takeaway.com the then subsidiary was known as Just Eat Limited. Between March 2014 and March 2020 it was Just Eat plc, and before that Just-Eat Group Holdings Limited.) until it was purchased by Netherlands-based Takeaway.com in 2020 forming Just Eat Takeaway.com. Just Eat acts as an intermediary between independent takeaway food outlets and customers. The service operates under the Just Eat brand name in seven countries. The platform enables customers to search for local takeaway restaurants, place orders and pay online, and to choose from pick-up or delivery options. The company Just Eat acquired SkipTheDishes in Canada and Menulog in Australia and New Zealand.

== History ==
Five Danish entrepreneurs, including Jesper Buch, founded Just Eat in Denmark and launched the service in August 2001. The company started with 15 employees. In 2005 the technology entrepreneur Bo Bendtsen (co-founder) bought out all the founders and initial investors apart from Jesper Buch and moved the company to the UK. Buch moved to the UK as part of the buyout in 2006, and hired Welsh executive David Buttress to join as CEO and co-founder of Just Eat UK in March. The international expansion from the UK headquarters, starting with the Netherlands, launched in July 2007 and was followed by Ireland in April 2008.

In January 2011, Just Eat established a joint venture in India. In February, the Group raised £30m (US$48m) from their Series B investment.

The money was used to finance:

- Four partnerships in new countries with local operators: Eat.ch in Switzerland in April, ClickEat in Italy in May, RestauranteWeb in Brazil in June and Alloresto in France in December;
- Three acquisitions to solidify its presence in the UK (Urbanbite to get into the corporate market) and Canada (YummyWeb purchased in April to cover the region of Vancouver and GrubCanada in October for the Ontario and British Columbia markets).

In April 2012, Just Eat acquired fillmybelly.com. A week later, Just Eat announced its £40 (US$64) million Series C funding round. The funds were partly used to launch the Don't Cook rebranding campaign in the UK and to acquire in October its main competitor in Spain, SinDelantal. Also in Spain, the company had previously acquired another delivery business, La Nevera Roja, from the German company Rocket Internet, taking over a large part of the market until the arrival of Uber Eats. After nearly five years at the helm of Just Eat, the group CEO Klaus Nyengaard stepped down in February 2013 and was replaced in May by former UK MD David Buttress.

On 3 April 2014, Just Eat floated on the London Stock Exchange. In July, Just Eat increased its stake in Alloresto to 80%. In September, Just Eat merged its Brazilian business, RestauranteWeb, with one of its competitors, iFood, to form the joint venture IF-JE in which Just Eat had a 25% stake. In February 2015, Just Eat sold to FoodPanda its investments in their Indian JV, and continued its expansion in the Americas by launching in Mexico, via a 100% acquisition of SinDelantal, and increased its stake in IF-JE, the Brazilian JV with iFood.

In May 2015, Just Eat announced that it would buy Menulog, an Australian food ordering company for A$855 million, and would fund the deal by issuing new shares. In July 2015, Just Eat acquired Orderit.ca, a Canadian online food ordering company, further solidifying its presence in Canada. In August 2016, Just Eat sold its operations in the Netherlands and Belgium to its Dutch competitor Takeaway.com for €22.5 million. Whereas Takeaway.com sold its UK operations to Just Eat also in 2016. In December 2016, Just Eat announced that it was acquiring Hungryhouse from Delivery Hero for £200m (with the possibility of a further £40m if the company hit performance targets), and Canada's SkipTheDishes for C$110m (£66m). On 12 October 2017, the Competition and Markets Authority gave its preliminary approval for the deal.

In February 2017, Buttress announced he would be leaving as CEO after four years, due to urgent family matters, continuing to be a non executive director. He later took up a role with Newport, Wales-based rugby union side Dragons as their CEO. His departure was noted by industry commentators as a "significant loss" for the business, with Buttress having been "one of the UK's stand out entrepreneurs of the last decade".

On 29 July 2019, it was announced that Just Eat and Takeaway.com had agreed the terms for a merger of the companies in a deal worth £9bn. On 10 January 2020, 80.4% of Just Eat shareholders approved Takeaway.com's deal to acquire Just Eat plc. Although Just Eat plc became a subsidiary of Takeaway.com on 3 February 2020, the Competition and Markets Authority ordered on 4 February 2020 that no integration should take place and that the brands should be kept separate until their investigation is completed. Just Eat plc was renamed to Just Eat Limited while the investigation took place. At the time of the merger Just Eat had 3,600 employees and 26.3 million customers in 2018. Takeaway.com won over a bid for Just Eat from Prosus.

Just Eat partnered with McDonald's in January 2020 to deliver food in the United Kingdom, ending the monopoly which Uber Eats had previously exercised in the country.

On 22 April 2020, The UK's Competition and Markets Authority announced it was unconditionally approving Just Eat's merger with Takeaway.com, following an investigation.

=== Under Just Eat Takeaway.com ===
On 2 March 2022, in a response to its announcement of losses, Just Eat Takeaway revealed plans to exit Portugal, Romania and Norway from 1 April 2022.

On 5 May 2022, Just Eat Takeaway announced that Just Eat in the United Kingdom would be partnering with Domino's Pizza. The two launched a trial in May where ten Domino's-owned stores in London would be placed on the platform. 106 Domino's franchise partner stores in the UK were expected to be on the platform by the end of May. Just Eat would be the only food delivery app in the United Kingdom to offer Domino's.

In July 2022, the company announced 390 redundancies in France, after its market capital fell following the COVID-19 pandemic.

In March 2023, Just Eat Takeaway announced 1,700 delivery driver redundancies in the UK, with drivers to work as gig workers (freelancers) instead of being employed.

In July 2024, Just Eat announced its intention to leave France.

In August 2024, the Advertising Standards Authority upheld a complaint that Just Eat failed to use appropriate targeting to ensure an advertisement featuring products that were high in fat, sugar and salt was not directed at under 16s.

In March 2026, The UK's Competition and Markets Authority announced they were looking into whether the business had inflated the star ratings of some restaurants and grocers.

=== Ireland ===
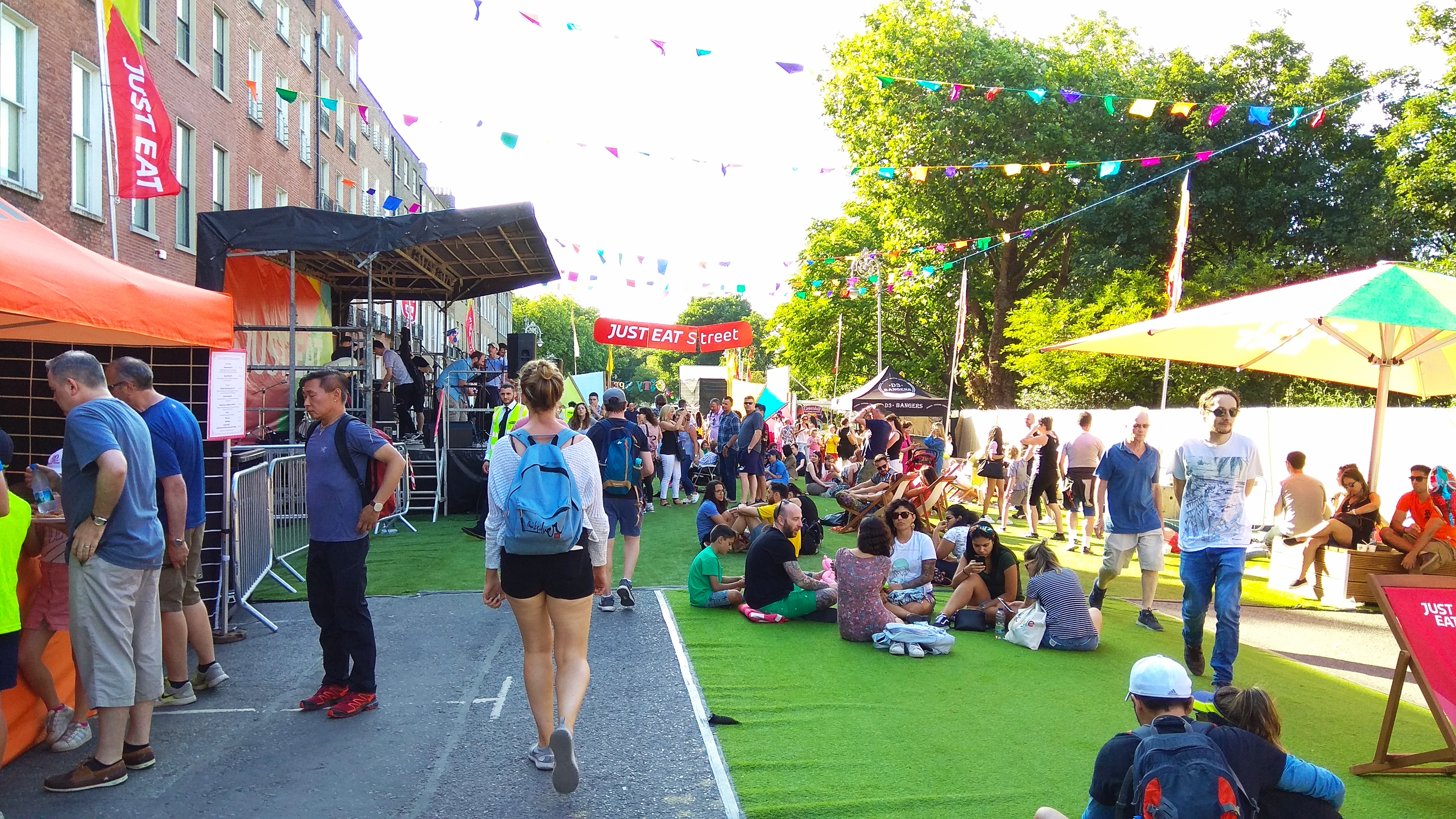
Merrion Square S – Just Eat Street, Dublin, Ireland

Just Eat Ireland launched in April 2008. In November 2014, Just Eat acquired 250 restaurants from Eatcity.ie. Just Eat Ireland recently commissioned economic consultants DKM to carry out research on the Irish restaurant industry and found that nearly €1.5bn was spent on takeaway/delivered food by Irish consumers in 2015. DKM said in 2016 that takeaway services accounted for 57% of restaurant sales, and that the sector was likely to grow by 17% in the next four years. In 2023, Just Eat reported that Irish consumers were spending approximately €2.2 billion annually on takeaway/delivered food, indicating a significant increase from the €1.5 billion spent in 2015.

=== North America ===
Just Eat entered into the North American market in July 2009, bolstering its Canadian operations with the acquisition of YummyWeb (Vancouver) in April 2011, GrubCanada (Ontario) in October 2011 and OrderIt.ca in July 2015. In December 2016, Just Eat acquired SkipTheDishes for an initial, C$110 million. A further cash amount of up to C$90 million may also be payable, subject to certain financial targets being met in 2018 and 2019. Just Eat's existing Canadian operations were subsequently folded into the SkipTheDishes brand.

SkipTheDishes operates a food delivery service that allows customers to order from a variety of local and national chain restaurants using the SkipTheDishes website or mobile phone app. The service is widely available across most larger centres in every province in Canada. Skip was present in a limited number of American cities including St. Louis, Omaha, Buffalo, Cleveland, Columbus, and Cincinnati, but exited the US market in 2019. SkipTheDishes is headquartered in Winnipeg, Manitoba, Canada.

=== India ===
Just Eat India was founded on 26 July 2006, as HungryBangalore, by Ritesh Dwivedy. In August 2008, HungryBangalore was renamed as HungryZone. HungryZone received a first round of funding raised from the Indian Angel Network. On 17 January 2011, HungryZone announced a partnership with Just Eat. Just Eat bought a 60% stake in HungryZone. Just Eat disposed of its shares in its India business in January 2015.

== Investment ==
In July 2009, Just Eat received their first Series A investment funding. Index Ventures and Venrex Capital invested £10.5 million into Just Eat Holdings Ltd. The new investment capital enabled Just Eat to increase their expansion into other markets and further develop the business. In March 2011 a second round of investment saw two leading US venture capitalists, Greylock Partners and Redpoint Ventures invest £30 million. Greylock Partners had previously invested in Facebook, LinkedIn and Wonga. In April 2012, a third round of investment saw Vitruvian Partners and existing backers Index Ventures, Greylock Partners and Redpoint Ventures invest a further £40 million in Just Eat Holdings Ltd.

In January 2019, the company bought Flyt, the startup with software for restaurants and food suppliers, for £22 million.

== Branding ==
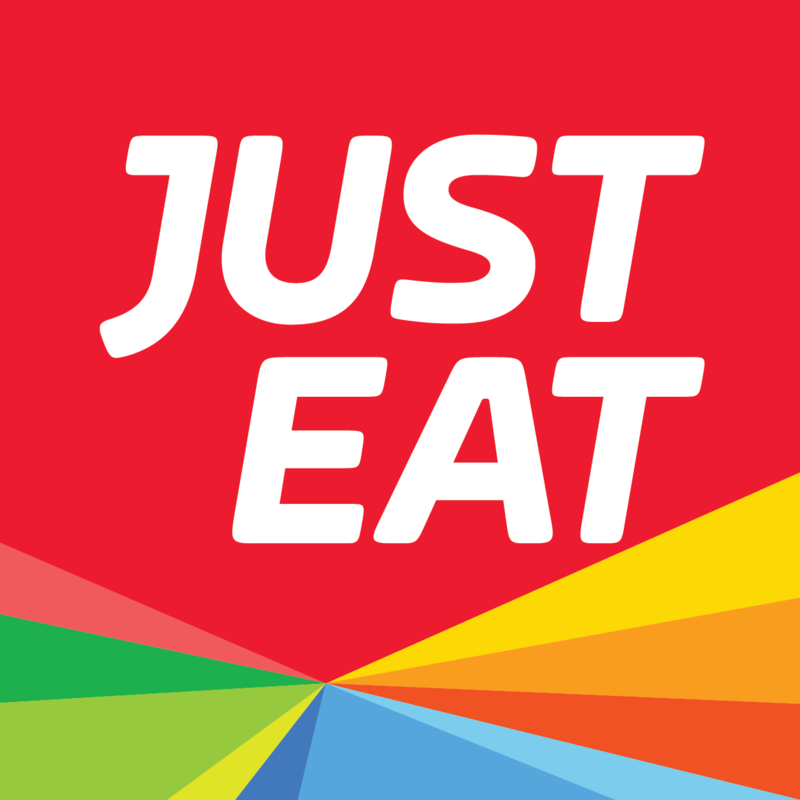
Pre-2020 Just Eat logo used in France

In 2016, Just Eat UK rebranded (including a new logo).

=== TV advertisements UK ===
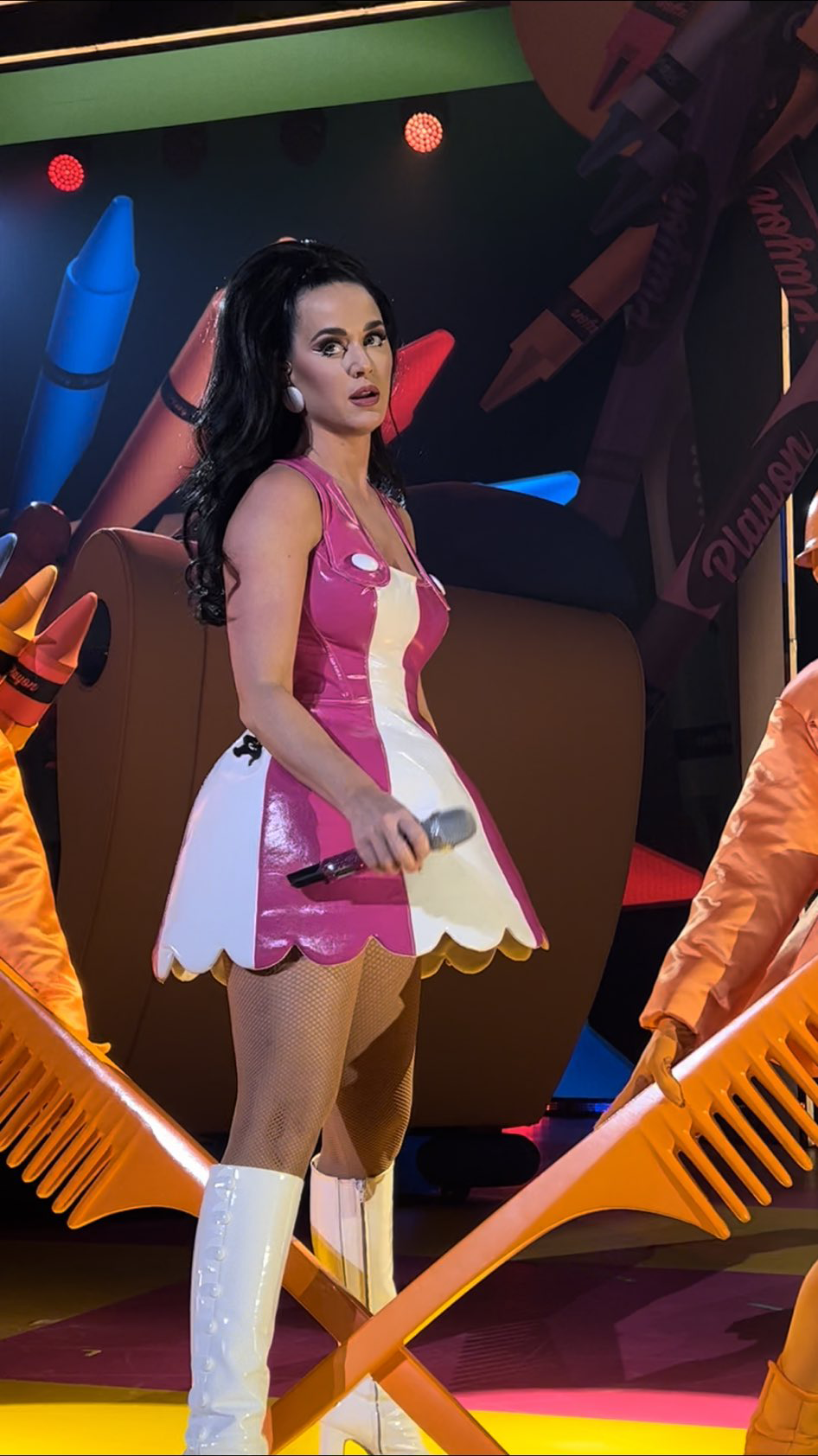
Katy Perry performing at her Las Vegas residency in 2021

In late 2009, Just Eat UK began their first television marketing campaign. The adverts starred Just Eat's mascots "Belly" and "Brain" and were narrated by Bernard Cribbins. The first two adverts entitled "Attention Please" and "Down and Up" ran throughout 2010. At the start of 2011, a second wave of "Belly and Brain" TV adverts ran, titled "Listen and Learn" and "Boxing Clever".

Following a complete overhaul of their global brand positioning and launch of the Don't Cook Just Eat brand campaign in September 2012, Just Eat launched a new series of TV ads. The adverts introduce audiences to Mr Mozzarella AKA "The Mozz", Ms. Neilly, Mr Basmati, Mr Sweet and Mr Sour, Mr T-Bone, Mr Sashimi and Mr Halloumi – a hapless, motley crew of rebellious takeaway chefs, who will stop at nothing to prevent amateur chefs from cooking at home. The ads include "Leave Cooking to Professionals", "Cooking is Dangerous", "Cookbooks," "Turn back, Cicciolina", and "The Fridge".

From 2020, American rapper Snoop Dogg appeared in Just Eat advertisements.

In May 2022, it was announced that American singer-songwriter Katy Perry would replace Snoop Dogg in the Just Eat advertisements.

In October 2023, American rapper Latto and singer-songwriter Christina Aguilera were introduced in a new promotional advertisement for Just Eat, taking over from Perry.

=== Sponsorship ===
In May 2014 Just Eat became the primary shirt sponsor for Derby County Football Club for the 2014–15 season. The sponsorship lasted until the end of the 2016–17 season.

In July 2015, Just Eat became the primary shirt sponsor for Oud-Heverlee Leuven for the 2015–16 season. The team was relegated to the Belgian First Division B. The sponsorship continued, with Just Eat advertised on the back, rather than the front, of shirts for the 2016–17 season.

Just Eat sponsored the fourteenth and fifteenth series of The X Factor (UK), replacing TalkTalk.

Just Eat also became sponsors for the official Edinburgh cycle hire scheme, which was named Just Eat Cycles from its start in September 2018.

Starting on 22 March 2021, Just Eat became the sponsors of the UEFA club competitions along with the other Just Eat Takeaway subsidiaries worldwide starting in the 2021 to 2024 cycle for the UK, French, Spanish, Swiss, Italian and the Irish markets, after being awarded the first-ever confederation-wide sponsorship contract in the UEFA Euro 2020.

== Business model ==
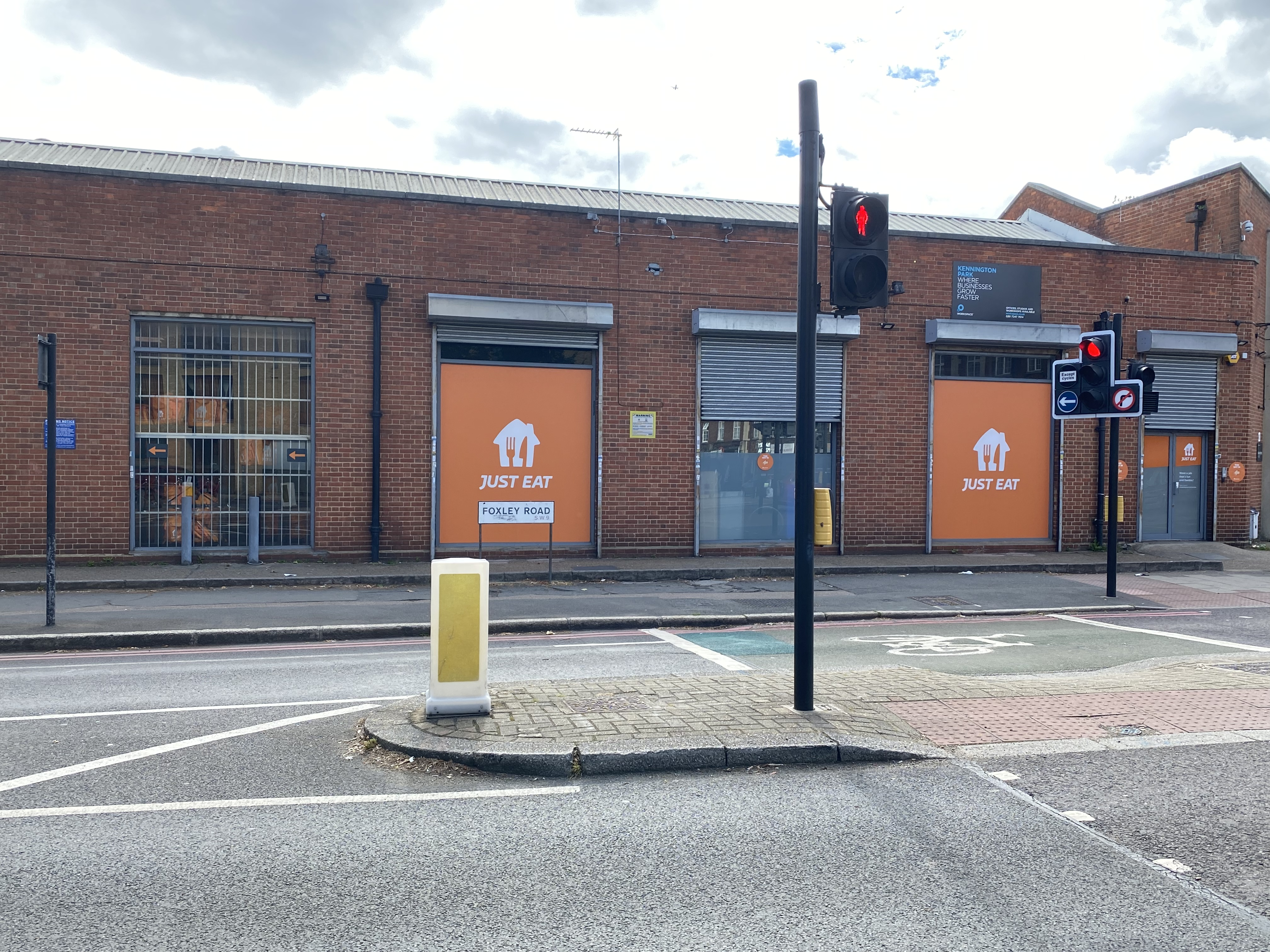
Just Eat delivery hub in London

In the UK, Just Eat charges restaurants £699 to join the service, plus a 13–14% commission for each order placed through the website or mobile app. Over 90% of the company's revenue comes from the commission.

Although Just Eat requires restaurants to provide evidence of registration with their local council when joining the service, a 2017 audit found 35 unlicensed restaurants with no hygiene rating. In October 2018, a BBC investigation found that half of the takeaway outlets in England rated zero for hygiene by the Food Standards Agency in Manchester, Bristol and London appeared on the Just Eat app.

In December 2021, Just Eat partnered with Asda supermarket to deliver groceries, the company's first partnership with a supermarket in the UK.

In July 2023, Just Eat entered a partnership with Nisa convenience stores, for Just Eat to deliver items in less than 30 minutes for Nisa customers who use the Just Eat app booking system.

== Markets ==
As of June 2022, the Just Eat brand operated in Denmark, France, Ireland, Italy, Spain, Switzerland, and the United Kingdom.

As of March 2026, Just Eat had stopped operations in Denmark.

== See also ==
- List of websites about food and drink
- Cyclologistics
