= MasterChef =

Reality competitive cooking show

- Created by: Franc Roddam
- Original work: MasterChef (British TV series)
- Owner: Banijay Entertainment
- Years: 1990–2001, 2005–present

Films and television
- Television series: MasterChef (independent international versions, see below and other versions)

Miscellaneous
- Genre: Cooking show
- First aired: 2 July 1990 (original format); 21 February 2005 (revived format)
- Last aired: 3 July 2001 (original format)

MasterChef is a competitive cooking show television format created by Franc Roddam, which originated with the British version in July 1990. The show aims to discover the culinary talent of chefs of varying skill levels, through a series of cooking challenges, watched over by various acclaimed food critics and chefs.

Dave Ross commissioned the show for the BBC and gave it the name; he had already produced Masterteam, a quiz show hosted by Angela Rippon, and worked on the long-running Mastermind, and so the name was a continuation of that. The format was revived and updated for the BBC in February 2005 by executive producers Roddam and John Silver with series producer Karen Ross.

The revived format is sold internationally by Banijay. Its first international adaptation was MasterChef Australia, which began in 2009. The show has since been adapted in several other countries.

== Format ==
The show's format has been exported around the world under the same MasterChef logo, and is now produced in more than 50 countries and airs in over 200 territories. In 2017, Guinness World Records officially recognised it as the world's most successful cookery television format.

The format has appeared most often in four major versions: the main MasterChef series, MasterChef: The Professionals for professional working chefs, Celebrity MasterChef featuring celebrities as the contestants, and Junior MasterChef, a version created and adapted for children, which was first developed in 1994 and has also expanded to other countries in recent years.

Despite the four major versions, in 2012, Australia created the fifth version called MasterChef All-Stars, for former contestants to raise money for charity. In 2018, Ukraine created MasterChef Teens, for teenage contestants. In 2019, Brazil created MasterChef: Para Tudo (MasterChef: Stop Everything), a TV show featuring interviews with judges and former contestants, plus recipes and memes, presented by Ana Paula Padrão. In Brazil, MasterChef All-Stars was titled MasterChef: A Revanche (MasterChef: The Rematch), being released in 2019 and featuring former contestants who did not win the competition before. In 2022, Brazil created MasterChef +, for senior contestants over 60 years old. In 2023, Australia created MasterChef: Dessert Masters, dedicated for confectionery and patissiere.

As of 2010, MasterChef Australia was the most watched television series in Australia, with the season 2 finale being the third most watched show in Australian television history. MasterChef Australia also won the award for 'Most Popular Reality Program' at the 2010 Logie Awards. Many other countries also broadcast the Australian version, either dubbed or with subtitles in the local language.

In 2018, the mobile game developer Animoca secured the licence to make MasterChef games.

== International versions ==
Current, previous and upcoming versions include:

Currently airing franchise
Franchise no longer in production

Country/Region	Name	Presenter(s)	Judges	Network	Premiere / Air dates
Albania	MasterChef Albania	Manjola Merlika (narrator)	Sokol Prenga; Renato Mekolli; Gëzim Musliaka (Seasons 1–2); Fundim Gjepali (Season 3)	Top Channel	8 March – 7 June 2014 (Season 1); 15 November 2014 – 14 February 2015 (Season 2); 18 September 2015 – 1 January 2016 (Season 3)
Albania	MasterChef Junior Albania	Redjan Mulla (narrator)	Sokol Prenga; Xheraldina Vula; Julian Zguro	RTSH	27 March – 12 June 2018 (Season 1)
Argentina	MasterChef Argentina	Mariano Peluffo (Season 1–2); Wanda Nara (Season 3)	Donato de Santis; Germán Martitegui; Christophe Krywonis (Season 1–2); Damián Betular (Season 3–present)	Telefe	6 April – 27 July 2014 (Season 1); 8 April – 26 August 2015 (Season 2); 20 March – 6 August 2023 (Season 3)
Argentina	MasterChef Junior	Mariano Peluffo (Season 1–2); Veronica Lozano (Season 3)	Donato de Santis; Germán Martitegui; Christophe Krywonis	Telefe	7 July – 2 September 2015 (Season 1); 25 September 2015 – 8 January 2016 (Season 2)
Argentina	MasterChef Celebrity	Santiago del Moro (Season 1–3); Wanda Nara (Season 4–present)	Donato de Santis; Germán Martitegui; Damián Betular	Telefe	5 October 2020 – 18 January 2021 (Season 1); 22 February – 24 June 2021 (Season 2); 2026 (Season 2)
Asia	MasterChef Asia	No presenter	Susur Lee; Bruno Menard; Audra Morrice	Lifetime	3 September – 10 December 2015 (Original)
Asia	MasterChef Asia	No presenter	Edward Lee; Pichaya Soontornyanakij; Kelvin Cheung	TLC Southeast Asia	22 September 2026 – present (Rematch)
Australia	MasterChef Australia	Sarah Wilson (Season 1); Gary Mehigan (Season 2–11); George Calombaris (Season 2–11); Matt Preston (Season 2–11); Andy Allen (Season 12–); Melissa Leong (Season 12–15); Jock Zonfrillo ^{†} (Season 12–15); Poh Ling Yeow (Season 16–); Jean-Christophe Novelli (Season 16–); Sofia Levin (Season 16–)	Gary Mehigan (Season 1–11); George Calombaris (Season 1–11); Matt Preston (Season 1–11); Donna Hay (Guest Judge, Season 2); Matt Moran (Guest Judge, Season 3); Andy Allen (Season 12–); Melissa Leong (Season 12–15); Jock Zonfrillo ^{†} (Season 12–15); Poh Ling Yeow (Season 16–); Jean-Christophe Novelli (Season 16–); Sofia Levin (Season 16–)	Network Ten	27 April – 19 July 2009 (Season 1); 19 April – 25 July 2010 (Season 2); 1 May – 7 August 2011 (Season 3); 6 May – 25 July 2012 (Season 4); 2 June – 1 September 2013 (Season 5); 5 May – 28 July 2014 (Season 6); 5 May – 27 July 2015 (Season 7); 1 May – 26 July 2016 (Season 8); 1 May – 24 July 2017 (Season 9); 7 May – 31 July 2018 (Season 10); 29 April – 23 July 2019 (Season 11); 13 April – 20 July 2020 (Season 12); 19 April – 13 July 2021 (Season 13); 18 April – 12 July 2022 (Season 14); 7 May – 16 July 2023 (Season 15); 22 April – 16 July 2024 (Season 16); 28 April – 12 August 2025 (Season 17); 19 April – 9 August 2026 (Season 18)
Australia	Celebrity MasterChef Australia	George Calombaris (Season 1); Gary Mehigan (Season 1); Andy Allen (Season 2); Melissa Leong (Season 2); Jock Zonfrillo ^{†} (Season 2)	Gary Mehigan (Season 1); George Calombaris (Season 1); Matt Preston (Season 1); Andy Allen (Season 2); Melissa Leong (Season 2); Jock Zonfrillo ^{†} (Season 2)	Network Ten	30 September – 25 November 2009 (Season 1); 10 October – 22 November 2021 (Season 2)
Australia	Junior MasterChef Australia	Gary Mehigan (Season 1–2); George Calombaris (Season 1–2); Matt Preston (Season 1); Andy Allen (Season 3); Melissa Leong (Season 3); Jock Zonfrillo (Season 3)	Anna Gare (Season 1–2); Gary Mehigan (Season 1–2); George Calombaris (Season 1–2); Matt Preston (Season 1); Matt Moran (Season 2); Andy Allen (Season 3); Melissa Leong (Season 3); Jock Zonfrillo (Season 3)	Network Ten	12 September – 15 November 2010 (Season 1); 25 September – 23 November 2011 (Season 2); 11 October – 9 November 2020 (Season 3)
Australia	MasterChef Australia All-Stars	George Calombaris; Gary Mehigan	Gary Mehigan; George Calombaris; Matt Preston	Network Ten	26 July – 19 August 2012
Australia	MasterChef Australia: The Professionals	Marco Pierre White; Matt Preston	Marco Pierre White; Matt Preston	Network Ten	20 January – 17 March 2013
Australia	Dessert Masters	Melissa Leong; Amaury Guichon	Melissa Leong; Amaury Guichon	Network Ten	12 November – 28 November 2023 (Season 1); 14 October – 24 November 2024 (Season 2)
Belgium (Flanders)	MasterChef Belgium	Dina Tersago (2010); No host (2011–2012)	Wout Bru (2010–2012); Stéphane Buyens (2010); Jean-Paul Perez (2011); Kenny Bernaerts (2012)	VTM	28 June – 29 July 2010 (Season 1); 4 July – 18 August 2011 (Season 2); 2 July – 23 August 2012 (Season 3)
Belgium (Flanders)	Celebrity MasterChef Vlaanderen	No host	Nick Bril; Inge Waeles; Michaël Rewers	Play4	4 September – 11 October 2023 (Season 1); 4 March – 10 April 2024 (Season 2)
Bolivia	MasterChef Bolivia	Anabel Angus	Marcos González; Coral Ayoroa; Marko Bonifaz	Unitel	11 July – 2 October 2022 (Season 1); 17 July – 9 October 2023 (Season 2)
Bolivia	MasterChef Celebrity Bolivia	Anabel Angus	Marcos González; Coral Ayoroa; Marko Bonifaz	Unitel	9 June – 15 August 2026 (Season 1); 7 April – 12 June 2026 (Season 2)
Brazil	MasterChef Brazil	Ana Paula Padrão (2014–2024); No presenters (2025–)	Paola Carosella (2014–2020); Rodrigo Oliveira (2023); Henrique Fogaça; Erick Jacquin; Helena Rizzo	Band	2 September – 16 December 2014 (Season 1); 19 May – 15 September 2015 (Season 2); 15 March – 23 August 2016 (Season 3); 7 March – 22 August 2017 (Season 4); 6 March – 31 July 2018 (Season 5); 24 March – 25 August 2019 (Season 6); 14 July – 29 December 2020 (Season 7); 6 July – 14 December 2021 (Season 8); 17 May – 6 September 2022 (Season 9); 2 May – 12 September 2023 (Season 10); 28 May – 12 November 2024 (Season 11); 27 May – 2 September 2025 (Season 12); 26 May 2026 – present (Season 13)
Brazil	MasterChef Júnior	Ana Paula Padrão (2014–2024); No presenters (2025–)	Paola Carosella (2014–2020); Rodrigo Oliveira (2023); Henrique Fogaça; Erick Jacquin; Helena Rizzo	Band	20 October – 15 December 2015 (Season 1); 20 – 29 December 2022 (Season 2)
Brazil	MasterChef Profissionais	Ana Paula Padrão (2014–2024); No presenters (2025–)	Paola Carosella (2014–2020); Rodrigo Oliveira (2023); Henrique Fogaça; Erick Jacquin; Helena Rizzo	Band	4 October – 13 December 2016 (Season 1); 5 September – 5 December 2017 (Season 2); 21 August – 11 December 2018 (Season 3); 13 September – 8 November 2022 (Season 4); 19 September – 14 November 2023 (Season 5)
Brazil	MasterChef: A Revanche (MasterChef: The Rematch)	Ana Paula Padrão (2014–2024); No presenters (2025–)	Paola Carosella (2014–2020); Rodrigo Oliveira (2023); Henrique Fogaça; Erick Jacquin; Helena Rizzo	Band	15 October – 17 December 2019 (Season 1)
Brazil	MasterChef + (MasterChef Senior)	Ana Paula Padrão (2014–2024); No presenters (2025–)	Paola Carosella (2014–2020); Rodrigo Oliveira (2023); Henrique Fogaça; Erick Jacquin; Helena Rizzo	Band	15 November – 13 December 2022 (Season 1); 21 November – 26 December 2023 (Season 2)
Brazil	MasterChef Confeitaria (MasterChef Confectionery)	Ana Paula Padrão (2014–2024); No presenters (2025–)	Henrique Fogaça (2024); Erick Jacquin; Helena Rizzo; Diego Lozano	Band	19 November – 19 December 2024 (Season 1); 9 September – 11 November 2025 (Season 2)
Brazil	MasterChef Celebridades	Ana Paula Padrão (2014–2024); No presenters (2025–)	Henrique Fogaça; Erick Jacquin; Helena Rizzo	Band	18 November 2025 – 20 January 2026 (Season 1)
Brazil	MasterChef Creators	Eduardo Camargo; Filipe Oliveira	Henrique Fogaça; Erick Jacquin; Helena Rizzo	YouTube	6 May – 20 May 2025 (Season 1)
Brazil	MasterChef: Para Tudo (MasterChef: Stop Everything)	Ana Paula Padrão	No judges	Band	26 March – 1 September 2019 (Season 1)
Bulgaria	MasterChef България (MasterChef Bulgaria)	No presenters	Andre Tokev (Seasons 1–7); Petar Mihalchev (Seasons 1–7); Viktor Angelov (Seasons 1–3); Leo Bianchi (Season 4); Silvena Rowe (Seasons 5–7); Ilian Kustev (Season 8); Aleksandar Taralezhkov (Season 8); Yavor Sarafov (Season 8)	bTV	3 March – 2 June 2015 (Season 1); 1 March – 1 June 2016 (Season 2); 27 February – 30 May 2017 (Season 3); 26 February – 29 May 2018 (Season 4); 25 February – 28 May 2019 (Season 5); 24 February – 12 May 2020; 13 September – 6 December 2020 (Season 6); 23 February – 26 May 2021 (Season 7); 8 September – 2 December 2023 (Season 8)
Cambodia	MasterChef Cambodia (Masterchef Khmer)	Jessica Elite Sethavarat	Jessica Elite Sethavarat (Season 1-present); Ren Nara (Season 1-present); Sun Meng Hy (Season 3-present); Su Sophorn Rithy (Season 1–2)	CTN	19 August 2018 – 3 February 2019 (Season 1); 9 August 2020 – 25 January 2021 (Season 2); 26 May – 10 November 2024 (Season 3); 8 June – 28 December 2025 (Season 4)
Cambodia	Junior MasterChef Cambodia	Jessica Elite Sethavarat	Sun Meng Hy; Sao Sopheak; Seng Sothea	CTN	12 July 2026 - present (Season 1)
Canada	MasterChef Canada	Original series: Charlie Ryan (narrator)	Original series: Alvin Leung; Claudio Aprile; Michael Bonacini; Revived series: Hugh Acheson; Mary Berg; Craig Wong	CTV	Original series: 20 January 2014 – 16 May 2021; Revived series: 2 October 2025 – present
Canada; Quebec	MasterChef Québec	Martin Picard; Stefano Faita		TVA	8 January – 4 April 2024 (Season 1); 9 September – 5 December 2024 (Season 2); 8 September – 7 December 2025 (Season 3); September 2026 - present (Season 4)
Chile	MasterChef Chile	Diana Bolocco (Seasons 1–3)	Christopher Carpentier (Season 1–4); Ennio Carota (Season 1–3); Yann Yvin (Seasons 1–2, 5); Sergi Arola (Season 3); Fernanda Fuentes (Seasons 4–5); Jorge Rausch (Season 4)Juan Manuel Pena Passaro (Season 5)	Canal 13	27 October 2014 – 1 February 2015 (Season 1); 18 October 2015 – 28 January 2016 (Season 2); 5 March – 11 June 2017 (Season 3); 3 March – 23 June 2019 (Season 4)
Chile	MasterChef Chile	María Luisa Godoy (Season 5)	Christopher Carpentier (Season 1–4); Ennio Carota (Season 1–3); Yann Yvin (Seasons 1–2, 5); Sergi Arola (Season 3); Fernanda Fuentes (Seasons 4–5); Jorge Rausch (Season 4)Juan Manuel Pena Passaro (Season 5)	TVN	5 October 2026 – present (Season 5)
China	顶级厨师 (MasterChef China)	Jonathan Lee Tsung-sheng (2012); Jereme Leung Ji-gang (2013); Cao Kefan (2012–2013); Steven Liu I-fan (2012–2013)		Dragon TV; JSTV	29 July – 14 October 2012 (Season 1); 16 January – 4 April 2013 (Season 2)
Colombia	MasterChef Colombia	Claudia Bahamón	Paco Roncero; Jorge Rausch; Nicolás de Zubiría	RCN TV	14 January – 21 April 2015 (Season 1)March 30 – 8 July 2016 (Season 2)
Colombia	MasterChef Junior	Claudia Bahamón	Jose Ramon Castillo; Jorge Rausch; Nicolás de Zubiría	RCN TV	2015 (Season 1)
Colombia	MasterChef Celebrity	Claudia Bahamón	Jorge Rausch; Nicolás de Zubiría; Christopher Carpentier (Seasons 1–5); Adria Marina (Season 6); Belén Alonso (Season 7–present)	RCN TV	5 June – 9 September 2018 (Season 1); 14 September 2019 – 29 March 2020 (Season 2); 5 June – 1 November 2021 (Season 3); 21 February – 12 July 2022 (Season 4); 29 May – 8 October 2023 (Season 5); 18 June – 17 December 2024 (Season 6); 13 June – 25 November 2025 (Season 7); 21 July 2026 – present (Season 8)
Croatia	MasterChef Croatia	Igor Mešin (Season 1–3)	Tomislav Gretić (Season 1); Mate Janković (Season 1–2); Radovan Marčić (Season 1–3); Dino Galvagno (Season 2–3); Andrej Barbijeri (Season 3); Melkior Bašić (Season 4–6); Damir Tomljanović (Season 4–6); Stjepan Vukadin (Season 4-); Goran Kočiš (Season 7-); Mario Mihelj (Season 7-)	Nova TV	21 March – 17 June 2011 (Season 1); 24 September – 24 December 2012 (Season 2); 22 March – 5 June 2015 (Season 3); 19 September – 30 December 2021 (Season 4); 18 September – 30 December 2022 (Season 5); 4 September – 29 December 2023 (Season 6); 15 September – 30 December 2024 (Season 7); 15 September – 30 December 2025 (Season 8)
Czech Republic	MasterChef Česko	No presenters	Marek Raditsch (Seasons 1–2); Marek Fichtner (Seasons 1–2); Miroslav Kalina (Seasons 1–2); Přemek Forejt (Season 3–7); Radek Kašpárek (Season 3–7); Jan Punčochář (Season 3–7)	TV Nova	7 October – 16 December 2015 (Season 1); 21 August – 23 November 2016 (Season 2); 9 January – 12 June 2019 (Season 3); 5 February – 3 November 2020 (Season 4); 31 August – 24 November 2021 (Season 5); 30 August – 14 December 2022 (Season 6); 30 August – 20 December 2023 (Season 7); TBA August – TBA December 2026 (Season 8)
Czech Republic; Slovakia	MasterChef ČS	Daniela Peštová	Martin Korbelič; Jiří Štift; Radek Šubrt	Markíza; Nova	31 August – 7 December 2012 (Season 1)
Denmark	Masterchef Danmark	Thomas Herman (Season 1–4); Henrik-Yde-Andersen (Season 1); Anders Aagaard (Season 1–2); Henrik Boserup (Season 3–4); David Johansen (Season 4); Thomas Castberg (Season 2-present); Jakob Mielcke (Season 4-present); Jesper Koch (Season 5-present)		TV3	5 September – December 2011 (Season 1); September – December 2012 (Season 2); January – May 2013 (Season 3); January – May 2014 (Season 4); January – May 2015 (Season 5); January – May 2016 (Season 6); January – May 2017 (Season 7); February – June 2018 (Season 8)
Dominican Republic	MasterChef República Dominicana	Mildred Quiroz	Saverio Stassi; Inés Páez Nin (Tita); Leandro Díaz	Telesistema 11	5 August – 16 December 2018 (Season 1); 7 April – 18 August 2019 (Season 2); 18 October 2020 – 2021 (Season 3)
Dominican Republic	MasterChef Junior Dominican Republic	Mildred Quiroz	Saverio Stassi; Inés Páez Nin (Tita); Leandro Díaz	Telesistema 11	28 November 2019 – 7 January 2020 (Season 1)
Ecuador	MasterChef Ecuador	Érika Vélez (Seasons 1-4); Virginia Limongi (Season 5)	Carolina Sánchez; Enrique Sempere (Season 1); Jorge Rausch (Seasons 1-4); Irene González (Seasons 2-5); Oscar Santacoloma (Season 5)	Teleamazonas	16 September – 16 December 2019 (Season 1); 16 November 2020 – 22 February 2021 (Season 2); 15 November 2021 – 21 February 2022 (Season 3); 28 November 2022 – 21 March 2023 (Season 4); TBA (Season 5)
Ecuador	MasterChef Ecuador: Tiempo Extra	Jorge Rausch; Carolina Sánchez; Irene González		Teleamazonas	28 November 2020 – 20 February 2021 (Season 1); 30 November 2021 – 19 February 2022 (Season 2); 10 December 2022 – 18 March 2023 (Season 3)
Ecuador	MasterChef Celebrity Ecuador	Érika Vélez (Seasons 1-2); Virginia Limongi (Season 3)	Jorge Rausch; Carolina Sánchez; Irene González; Cecilia Cedeño (Season 3)	Teleamazonas	20 November 2023 – 5 March 2024 (Season 1); 18 November 2024 – 24 March 2025 (Season 2); 18 November 2025 – 14 April 2026 (Season 3)
Estonia	MasterChef Eesti	Orm Oja (Also a judge)	Orm Oja; Õie Pritson; Roman Zaštšerinski (Season 3–present); Mihkel Heinmets (Season 1–2)	Telia Inspira	8 October – 24 December 2022 (Season 1); 7 October – 23 December 2023 (Season 2); TBA October – TBA December 2026 (Season 3)
Estonia	MasterChef Eesti: kuulsused köögis	Orm Oja (Also a judge)	Orm Oja; Õie Pritson; Imre Kose	Telia Inspira	5 October – 21 December 2024 (Season 1)
Estonia	MasterChef Eesti: professionaalid	Orm Oja (Also a judge)	Orm Oja; Õie Pritson; Silver Illak	Telia Inspira	4 October – 20 December 2025 (Season 1)
Finland	MasterChef Suomi	Mikko Silvennoinen	Sikke Sumari; Tomi Björck; Risto Mikkola	Nelonen (2011–2021); MTV3 (2022–present)	18 January 2011 – present
France	MasterChef France	Carole Rousseau (Season 1–3); Sébastien Demorand (Season 4); Sandrine Quétier (Season 5); Agathe Lecaron (Season 6)	Frédéric Anton (Season 1–4); Yves Camdeborde (Season 1–4–6); Sébastien Demorand (Season 1–4); Amandine Chaignot (Season 4); Gilles Goujon (Season 5); Christian Etchebest (Season 5); Yannick Delpech (Season 5); Thierry Marx (Season 6); Georgiana Viou (Season 6)	TF1 (2010–2015); NT1 (2015); France 2 (2022)	19 August – 4 November 2010 (Season 1); 18 August – 3 November 2011 (Season 2); 23 August – 8 November 2012 (Season 3); 20 September – 20 December 2013 (Season 4); 25 June – 3 September 2015 (Season 5); 26 August – 27 September 2022 (Season 6)
France	MasterChef Junior France	Carole Rousseau (Season 1–2)	Frédéric Anton (Season 1–3); Yves Camdeborde (Season 1–3); Sébastien Demorand (Season 1–3); Amandine Chaignot (Season 3)	TF1	22 December 2011 (Season 1); 5 July 2012 (Season 2); 27 December 2013 (Season 3)
France	MasterChef : Les meilleurs	Carole Rousseau	Frédéric Anton; Yves Camdeborde; Sébastien Demorand	TF1	24 May 2013
Georgia	MasterChef Georgia	Luka Nachkhebia (Season 1-); Konstantine Tedeluri (Season 1-); Levan Kobiashvili (Season 1-); Tekuna Gachechiladze (Season 6-)		First Channel	18 May – 20 July 2019 (Season 1); 27 October 2019 – 1 January 2020 (Season 2); 24 May – 26 July 2020 (Season 3); 20 September – 29 November 2020 (Season 4); 4 April – 20 June 2021 (Season 5); 19 September – 28 November 2021 (Season 6); 1 January – 19 June 2022 (Season 7); 25 September 2023 – present (Season 8)
Germany	Deutschlands MeisterKoch (Germany's MasterChef)	Tim Raue; Thomas Jaumann; Nelson Müller		Sat.1	27 August – 16 October 2010 (Season 1)
Germany	MasterChef Germany	Justin Leone (Season 1–2); Sybille Schönberger (Season 1–2); Ralf Zacherl (Season 1–3); Nelson Müller (Season 2–3); Maria Groß (Season 3); Robin Pietsch (Season 4); Felicitas Then (Season 4); Mike Süsser (Season 4)		Sky 1 (Season 1–3); Sport1 (Season 4–present)	3 November 2016 – 30 January 2017 (Season 1); 25 September – 11 December 2017 (Season 2); 25 September – 25 November 2019 (Season 3); 24 February – 9 May 2025 (Season 4)
Germany	MasterChef Celebrity	Ralf Zacherl; Meta Hiltebrand; Nelson Müller		Sky 1	31 August – 2 November 2020 (Season 1)
Greece; Cyprus	MasterChef Greece	Eugenia Manolidou (Season 1); Maria Synatsaki (Season 2); No presenters (Season 3–present)	Yiannis Loukakos (Season 1–2); Lefteris Lazarou (Season 1–2); Dimitris Skarmoutsos (Season 1–3); Panos Ioannidis (Season 3–present); Sotiris Kontizas (Season 3–present); Leonidas Koutsopoulos (Season 4–present)	Mega Channel (Season 1–2); Star Channel (Season 3–present)	3 October – 28 December 2010 (Season 1); 24 December 2012 – 17 March 2013 (Season 2); 4 May – 30 July 2017 (Season 3); 10 January – 7 May 2018 (Season 4); 21 January – 22 May 2019 (Season 5); 27 January – 17 June 2020 (Season 6); 23 January – 9 June 2021 (Season 7); 10 January – 15 June 2022 (Season 8); 16 January – 14 June 2023 (Season 9); 15 January – 13 June 2024 (Season 10); 20 January – 25 June 2025 (Season 11); 18 January – 25 June 2026 (Season 12)
Greece; Cyprus	Junior MasterChef Greece (Season 1); MasterChef Junior Greece (Season 2)	Maria Mpekatorou (Season 1); No presenters (Season 2)	Yiannis Loukakos (Season 1); Lefteris Lazarou (Season 1); Dimitris Skarmoutsos (Season 1); Eleni Psyhouli (Season 2); Manolis Papoutsakis (Season 2); Magky Tabakaki (Season 2)	Mega Channel (Season 1); Star Channel (Season 2)	27 November 2011 – 5 February 2012 (Season 1); 13 September – 24 December 2018 (Season 2)
Hungary	Mesterszakács	No presenters	Gianni Annoni; Bíró Lajos	Viasat 3	26 October 2009 – 2009
Hungary	MasterChef VIP Hungary	Nóra Ördög	Szása Nyíri (Season 1); János Mizsei (Season 1); Katalin Pintér (Season 2); Árpád Győrffy (Season 2); Richárd Farkas (Season 2)	TV2	27 August – 5 October 2018 (Season 1); 3 – 14 August 2020 (Season 2)
Hungary	MasterChef Junior Hungary	No presenters	István Pesti; Zsófia Mautner; Bence Szendrei	TV2	13 October – 15 December 2018
Iceland	MasterChef Ísland	No presenters	Ólafur Örn Ólafsson; Friðrika Hjördís Geirsdóttir; Eyþór Rúnarsson	Stöð 2	23 November 2012 – 15 February 2013
India	MasterChef India – Hindi	No presenters	Akshay Kumar (Season 1); Kunal Kapur (Season 1–3, 5, present); Ajay Chopra (Season 1–2); Vikas Khanna (Season 2-present); Sanjeev Kapoor (Season 3–4); Ranveer Brar (Season 4, 6-present); Zorawar Kalra (Season 5); Vineet Bhatia (Season 6); Garima Aora (Season 7); Pooja Dhingra (Season 8)	Star Plus (Season 1 – 6); Sony Entertainment Television (Season 7,9); SonyLIV (Season 7 – Present)	16 October – 25 December 2010 (Season 1); 22 October 2011 – 1 January 2012 (Season 2); 11 March – 9 June 2013 (Season 3); 26 January – 12 April 2015 (Season 4); 1 October – 25 December 2016 (Season 5); 7 December 2019 – 1 March 2020 (Season 6); 2 January – 31 March 2023 (Season 7); 16 October – 8 December 2023 (Season 8); 5 January – 6 March 2026 (Season 9)
India	Junior MasterChef India: Swaad Ke Ustaad	No presenters	Vikas Khanna; Kunal Kapur; Chef Jolly	Star Plus (Season 1 – 6); Sony Entertainment Television (Season 7,9); SonyLIV (Season 7 – Present)	17 August – 2 November 2013
India	MasterChef India – Tamil	Vijay Sethupathi (Season 1); No presenters (Season 2-present)	Koushik Shankar (Season 1-present); Harish Rao (Season 1); Aarthi Sampath (Season 1); Shreeya Adka (Season 2-present); Rakesh Raghunathan (Season 2-present)	Sun TV (Season 1); SonyLIV (Season 2-present)	7 August – 14 November 2021 (season 1); 22 April – 7 June 2024 (season 2)
India	MasterChef India – Telugu	Tamannaah; Anasuya Bharadwaj	Mahesh Padala (Season 1); Sanjay Thumma (Season 1-present); Chalapathi Rao (Season 1-present); Nikitha Umesh (Season 2-present)	Gemini TV	27 August – 27 November 2021 (season 1)
India	Celebrity MasterChef	Farah Khan	Ranveer Brar; Vikas Khanna; Farah Khan	SonyLIV; Sony Entertainment Television	27 January – 18 April 2025
Indonesia	MasterChef Indonesia	Vindex Tengker (Season 1); Rinrin Marinka (Season 1–3); Degan Septoadji (Season 2–3); Arnold Poernomo (Season 3–11); Matteo Guerinoni (Season 4); Renatta Moeloek (Season 5-12); Rudy Choiruddin (Season 12); Juna Rorimpandey (Season 1–2, 5-present); Karen Carlotta (Season 13-present); Norman Ismail (Season 13-present)		RCTI	1 May – 21 August 2011 (Season 1); 8 July – 28 October 2012 (Season 2); 5 May – 17 August 2013 (Season 3); 31 May – 12 September 2015 (Season 4); 3 March – 16 June 2019 (Season 5); 21 December 2019 – 8 March 2020 (Season 6); 29 September – 27 December 2020 (Season 7); 29 May – 29 August 2021 (Season 8); 22 January – 24 April 2022 (Season 9); 24 December 2022 – 26 March 2023 (Season 10); 26 August – 26 November 2023 (Season 11); 8 February – 17 May 2025 (Season 12); 13 December 2025 – 15 March 2026 (Season 13)
Indonesia	Junior MasterChef Indonesia	Degan Septoadji (Season 1); Rinrin Marinka (Season 1-3); Arnold Poernomo (Season 1-3); Bara Pattiradjawane (Season 2); Juna Rorimpandey (Season 3)		RCTI	6 April – 29 June 2014 (Season 1); 7 December 2014 – 15 May 2015 (Season 2); 2 July – 20 August 2022 (Season 3)
Ireland	MasterChef Ireland	Lorraine Pilkington (narrator)	Dylan McGrath; Nick Munier	RTÉ Two	8 September – 13 October 2011 (Series 1); 4 October – 13 December 2012 (Series 2); 4 March – 7 May 2014 (Series 3)
Ireland	Celebrity MasterChef Ireland	Lorraine Pilkington (narrator)	Dylan McGrath; Nick Munier	RTÉ One	14 July – 18 August 2013 (Series 1); 16 January – 6 March 2017 (Series 2)
Israel	מאסטר שף (MasterChef Israel)	Haim Cohen (Season 1-present); Eyal Shani (Season 1-present); Michal Ansky (Season 1-present); Yisrael Aharoni (Season 7-present); Ruti Broudo (Season 10-present); Rafi Adar (Season 1); Yonatan Roshfeld (Seasons 2–6)		Channel 2 (2010–2017); Keshet 12 (2017–present)	14 October 2010 – present
Israel	VIP מאסטר שף (MasterChef VIP (Israel))	Haim Cohen (VIP Season and Specials 1, 2, 3); Eyal Shani (VIP Season and Specials 1, 2, 3); Michal Ansky (VIP Season and Specials 1, 2, 3); Yisrael Aharoni (VIP Specials 1, 2, 3); Yonatan Rochfeld (VIP Season)		Channel 2 (2010–2017); Keshet 12 (2017–present)	1 February – 29 March 2015 (VIP Season); 16 November 2019 (Special VIP 1); 6 February 2022 (Special VIP 2); 7 February 2022 (Special VIP 3)
Italy	MasterChef Italia	Bruno Barbieri (Season 1-present); Joe Bastianich (Season 1–8); Carlo Cracco (Season 1–6); Antonino Cannavacciuolo (Season 5-present); Antonia Klugmann (Season 7); Giorgio Locatelli (Season 8-present)		Cielo (Season 1); Sky Uno (Season 2-present) Rerun; Sky Uno (Season 1); Cielo (Season 2–4); TV8 (Season 5-present)	21 September – 7 December 2011 (Season 1); 13 December 2012 – 21 February 2013 (Season 2); 19 December 2013 – 6 March 2014 (Season 3); 18 December 2014 – 5 March 2015 (Season 4); 17 December 2015 – 3 March 2016 (Season 5); 22 December 2016 – 9 March 2017 (Season 6); 21 December 2017 – 8 March 2018 (Season 7); 17 January – 4 April 2019 (Season 8); 19 December 2019 – 5 March 2020 (Season 9); 17 December 2020 – 4 March 2021 (Season 10); 16 December 2021 – 3 March 2022 (Season 11); 15 December 2022 – 2 March 2023 (Season 12); 14 December 2023 – 29 February 2024 (Season 13); 12 December 2024 – 27 February 2025 (Season 14); 11 December 2025 – 5 March 2026 (Season 15)
Italy	Celebrity MasterChef Italia	Bruno Barbieri; Joe Bastianich; Antonino Cannavacciuolo		Cielo (Season 1); Sky Uno (Season 2-present) Rerun; Sky Uno (Season 1); Cielo (Season 2–4); TV8 (Season 5-present)	16 March – 6 April 2017 (Season 1); 15 March – 5 April 2018 (Season 2)
Italy	Junior MasterChef Italia	Bruno Barbieri (Season 1–3); Lidia Bastianich (Season 1–2); Alessandro Borghese (Season 1–3); Gennaro Esposito (Season 3)		Cielo (Season 1); Sky Uno (Season 2-present) Rerun; Sky Uno (Season 1); Cielo (Season 2–4); TV8 (Season 5-present)	13 March – 10 April 2014 (Season 1); 15 April – 10 June 2015 (Season 2); 10 March – 5 May 2016 (Season 3)
Italy	MasterChef All Stars Italia	Bruno Barbieri; Antonino Cannavacciuolo; Guest judges		Cielo (Season 1); Sky Uno (Season 2-present) Rerun; Sky Uno (Season 1); Cielo (Season 2–4); TV8 (Season 5-present)	20 December 2018 – 10 January 2019 (Season 1)
Malaysia	MasterChef Malaysia	Moh Johari Edrus; Mohd. Nadzri Redzuawan; Zubir Md. Zain; Yahaya Hassan; Priya Menon	Moh Johari Edrus; Mohd. Nadzri Redzuawan (2011); Zubir Md. Zain; Adu Amran Hassan (2012–2013)	Astro Ria (2011–2013); Mustika HD (2012–2013); Maya HD (2013–2014)	22 October 2011 – 1 December 2012
Malaysia	MasterChef Selebriti Malaysia (MasterChef Celebrity Malaysia)	Moh Johari Edrus; Zubir Md. Zain; Adu Amran Hassan		Astro Ria (2011–2013); Mustika HD (2012–2013); Maya HD (2013–2014)	26 May 2012 – 26 June 2013
Malaysia	MasterChef Malaysia All-Stars	Moh Johari Edrus; Zubir Md. Zain; Adu Amran Hassan		Astro Ria (2011–2013); Mustika HD (2012–2013); Maya HD (2013–2014)	23 November 2013
Malta	MasterChef Malta	Joe Vella (seasons 1-2); Letizia Vella (seasons 1-); Victor Borg (seasons 1-) Pawlu Borg Bonaci (seasons 3-)		TVM	11 February – 5 May 2024 (Season 1); 29 September 2024 – 5 January 2025 (Season 2); 5 October 2025 – 4 January 2026 (Season 3) 4 October 2026 - present (Season 4)
Mexico	MasterChef México	Anette Michel	Adrián Herrera Díaz (2015–present); Benito Molina Dubost (2015–2019); Betty Vázquez (2015–present); Jose Ramón Castillo (2019–present)	Azteca Uno (Azteca)	28 June – 18 October 2015 (Season 1); 4 September – 18 December 2016 (Season 2); 27 August – 16 December 2017 (Season 3); 14 October 2018 – 10 February 2019 (Season 4); 30 October 2020 – 5 March 2021 (Season 5); 17 May 2026 - present (Season 6)
Mexico	MasterChef Junior México	Anette Michel	Adrián Herrera Díaz; Benito Molina Dubost; Betty Vázquez	Azteca Uno (Azteca)	3 April – 3 July 2016 (Season 1); 5 March – 11 June 2017 (Season 2)
Mexico	MasterChef México La Revancha	Anette Michel	Adrián Herrera Díaz; Benito Molina Dubost; Betty Vázquez; José Ramón Castillo	Azteca Uno (Azteca)	14 July – 3 November 2019 (Season 1)
Mexico	MasterChef Celebrity México	Rebecca de Alba	Adrián Herrera Díaz (2021–present); Betty Vázquez (2021–present); José Ramón Castillo (present); Fernando Stovell (2021–present)	Azteca Uno (Azteca)	20 August – 17 December 2021 (Season 1)
Myanmar	MasterChef Myanmar	Kaung Htet Zaw (1); Thazin Nwe Win (2)	Michel Louis Meca (1959–2019) (1); Jean Marc Lemmery (2); U Ye Htut Win (1-); Daw Phyu Phyu Tin (1-)	MRTV-4	9 September 2018 – 20 January 2019 (Season 1); 14 July – 24 November 2019 (Season 2); 20 September 2020 – 31 January 2021 (Season 3)
Netherlands	MasterChef	Renate Verbaan (2010); No host (2011–2015)	Hans van Wolde (2010); Alain Caron (2010–2014); Peter Lute (2010–2014); Julius Jaspers (2014); Michiel van der Eerde (2015–2016); Marcus Polman (2015–2016); Robert Kranenborg (2015–2016)	Net 5, SBS 6	26 September 2010 – present
Netherlands	MasterChef Celebrity	No presenters	Soenil Bahadoer; Angélique Schmeinck; Joel Broekaert	Viaplay	30 September – 9 December 2022
New Zealand	MasterChef New Zealand	No presenters	Ray McVinnie (Season 1–5); Josh Emett (Season 2–6); Simon Gault (Season 1–5); Ross Burden ^{†} (Season 1); Al Brown (Season 6); Mark Wallbank (Season 6); Michael P Dearth (Season 7); Nadia Lim (Season 7); Vaughan Mabee (Season 7)	TV One (2010–2014); TV3 (2015–2022)	3 February – 28 April 2010 (Season 1); 20 February – 15 May 2011 (Season 2); 21 February – 12 June 2012 (Season 3); 21 February – 2 June 2013 (Season 4); 2 February – 4 May 2014 (Season 5); 26 July – 28 September 2015 (Season 6); 29 May – 17 July 2022 (Season 7)
Nigeria	Masterchef Nigeria	Tolu "Eros" Erogbogbo; Abiola "Stone" Akanji		Africa Magic Showcase and Family	26 April – 19 July 2026 (Season 1)
Norway	Masterchef Norge	Jenny Skavlan	Eyvind Hellstrøm; Jan Vardøen; Tom Victor Gausdal	TV3	16 March 2010 – 2015
Pakistan	ماسٹر شیف پاکستان (MasterChef Pakistan)	Chef Zakir Qureshi (Season 1); Chef Mehboob Khan (Season 1); Chef Khurram Awan (Season 1); Saadat Siddiqi (Season 2-present); Mahwish Aziz (Season 2-present); Asad Monga (Season 2-present)		Urdu 1 (Season 1); Hum TV (Season 2-present)	3 May – 27 July 2014 (Season 1); 31 October 2025 – 6 February 2026 (Season 2)
Panama	MasterChef Panamá	María Isabella Perez	Cuquita Arias de Calvo; Fabien Mignoli; Felipe Milanés	Mall TV/RPC TV	19 September 2019
Paraguay	MasterChef Paraguay	Paola Maltese	Eugenia Aquino; José Torrijos; Rodolfo Angenscheidt (Season 1, 2, 4); Nicolás Bo (Season 3)	Telefuturo	3 April – 7 August 2018 (Season 1); 14 August – 18 December 2018 (Season 2); 1 April – 19 August 2019 (Season 3); 7 August – 19 December 2023 (Season 4)
Paraguay	MasterChef Paraguay Profesionales	Paola Maltese	Nicolás Bo; Eugenia Aquino; José Torrijos	Telefuturo	9 September – 23 December 2019 (Season 1)
Paraguay	MasterChef Paraguay Celebrity	Mercedes Almada	Eugenia Aquino; José Torrijos; Federico Scappini	SNT	19 May – 16 September 2025 (Season 1)
Peru	MasterChef Perú	Gastón Acurio	Astrid Gutsche; Mitsuharu "Mich" Tsumura; Renato Peralta	América Televisión	28 August – 11 December 2011
Philippines	MasterChef Pinoy Edition	Judy Ann Santos-Agoncillo	Fern Aracama; Rolando Laudico; JP Anglo	ABS-CBN	12 November 2012 – 9 February 2013
Philippines	Junior MasterChef Pinoy Edition	Judy Ann Santos-Agoncillo	Fern Aracama; Rolando Laudico; JP Anglo	ABS-CBN	27 August 2011 – 18 February 2012
Poland	MasterChef	No presenters	Current; Magda Gessler (Season 1-); Michel Moran (Season 1-); Przemysław Klima (Season 13-); Pascal Brodnicki (Season 15-); Former; Anna Starmach (Season 1–12); Tomasz Jakubiak ^{†} (Season 12)	TVN	2 September – 25 November 2012 (Season 1); 1 September – 1 December 2013 (Season 2); 7 September – 7 December 2014 (Season 3); 6 September – 13 December 2015 (Season 4); 4 September – 4 December 2016 (Season 5); 10 September – 10 December 2017 (Season 6; 9 September – 9 December 2018 (Season 7); 8 September – 8 December 2019 (Season 8); 6 September – 6 December 2020 (Season 9); 12 September – 5 December 2021 (Season 10); 4 September – 4 December 2022 (Season 11); 3 September – 10 December 2023 (Season 12); 1 September – 17 November 2024 (Season 13); 7 September – 23 November 2025 (Season 14); Upcoming season (Season 15)
Poland	MasterChef Junior	No presenters	Former; Michel Moran (Season 1–8); Anna Starmach (Season 1–8); Tomasz Jakubiak ^{†} (Season 7–8); Mateusz Gessler (Season 1–6)	TVN	21 February – 24 April 2016 (Season 1); 19 February – 7 May 2017 (Season 2); 4 March – 13 May 2018 (Season 3); 3 March – 5 May 2019 (Season 4); 8 March – 10 May 2020 (Season 5); 7 March – 9 May 2021 (Season 6); 6 March – 15 May 2022 (Season 7); 5 March – 7 May 2023 (Season 8)
Poland	MasterChef Teen	Former; Michał Korkosz (Season 1-2)	Former; Michel Moran (Season 1-2); Dorota Szelągowska (Season 1-2); Guest Judges for each challenge (Season 2); Tomasz Jakubiak ^{†} (Season 1)	TVN	3 March 2024 – 28 April 2024 (Season 1); 24 February – 14 April 2025 (Season 2)
Portugal	MasterChef	Sílvia Alberto	Justa Nobre; Ljubomir Stanisic; Chef Cordeiro	RTP1	9 July – 17 October 2011
Portugal	MasterChef Portugal	Manuel Luís Goucha; Teresa Fernandes (narrator)	Manuel Luís Goucha; Rui Paula; Miguel Rocha Vieira	TVI	8 March – 31 May 2014 (Season 1); 28 February – 6 June 2015 (Season 2)
Portugal	MasterChef Júnior	Manuel Luís Goucha	Manuel Luís Goucha; Rui Paula; Miguel Rocha Vieira	TVI	22 May – 31 July 2016 (Season 1); 19 November 2017 – 28 January 2018 (Season 2)
Portugal	MasterChef Celebridades	Leonor Poeiras	Miguel Rocha Vieira; Rui Paula; Kiko Martins	TVI	20 May – 9 July 2017 (Season 1)
Romania	MasterChef România (MasterChef Romania)	Current; Gina Pistol (9–) Former; Răzvan Fodor (1–6); No presenter (7–8)	Current; Sorin Bontea (1–3, 9–); Florin Dumitrescu (1–3, 9–); Cătălin Scărlătescu (1–3, 9–) Former; Patrizia Paglieri (4–5); Adrian Hădean (4–5); Răzvan Exarhu (6); Samuel le Torriellec (6); Liviu Popescu (6); Silviu Chelaru (7); Cosmin Tudoran (7); Florin "Foa" Scripcă (4–5, 8); Joseph Hadad (7–8); Radu Dumitrescu (8)	Pro TV	20 March – 6 June 2012 (Season 1); 15 March – 28 May 2013 (Season 2); 18 March – 10 June 2014 (Season 3); 15 September – 23 December 2014 (Season 4); 14 September – 14 December 2015 (Season 5); 13 February – 15 May 2017 (Season 6); 9 September – 14 November 2019 (Season 7); 12 January – 2 June 2022 (Season 8); 10 September – 11 December 2024 (Season 9); 8 September – 16 December 2025 (Season 10); 7 September 2026 – present (Season 11)
Romania	MasterChef - Proba celebrității (Celebrity MasterChef)	Current; Gina Pistol (2–) Former; Răzvan Fodor (1)	Sorin Bontea; Florin Dumitrescu; Cătălin Scărlătescu	Pro TV	8 October – 24 December 2013 (Season 1); 2027 (Season 2, upcoming season)
Russia	МастерШеф (MasterChef)	Arkady Novikov; Mirko Zago; Alexandr Sorkin (Season 1); Denis Krupenya (Season 2)		STS	2 November – 30 December 2013 (Season 1); 23 October – 25 December 2014 (Season 2)
Russia	МастерШеф. Дети (MasterChef Junior)	Alexander Belkovich; Alexey Shmakov; Giuseppe D'Angelo (Season 1); Dmitry Levitsky (Season 2)		STS	7 November 2015 – 6 February 2016 (Season 1); 9 October – 25 December 2016 (Season 2)
Serbia; Montenegro	MasterChef Srbija	No presenters	Filip Ćirić; Branko Kisić (Season 1–2); Nenad Atanasković; Guest judge (Season 3); Ljubica Komlenić (Season 4)	Prva TV; Prva CG	21 December 2023 – 23 March 2024 (Season 1); 19 September 2024 – 13 December 2024 (Season 2); 10 April – 28 June 2025 (Season 3); 11 September - 5 December 2025 (Season 4)
Singapore	MasterChef Singapore	No presenters	Bjorn Shen; Damian D'Silva; Audra Morrice	MediaCorp Channel 5	2 September – 21 October 2018 (Season 1); 21 February – 25 April 2021 (Season 2); 1 May – 3 July 2022 (Season 3); 9 August – 15 October 2023 (Season 4)
Slovakia	Masterchef Slovensko	No presenters	Branislav Križan; Jaroslav Ertl; Martin Záhumenský	Markíza	5 April – 23 June 2016
Slovenia	MasterChef Slovenija	No presenters	Luka Jezeršek (2015–present); Alma Rekić (2015–2017); Karim Merdjadi (2015–present); Bine Volčič (2018– 2023); Mojmir Šiftar (2024– present)	POP TV	1 April – 18 June 2015 (Season 1); 10 March – 9 June 2016 (Season 2); 8 March – 7 June 2017 (Season 3); 27 March – 28 June 2018 (Season 4); 27 March – 20 June 2019 (Season 5); 19 March – 12 November 2020 (Season 6); 18 March – 18 June 2021 (Season 7); 17 March 2022 – 2022 (Season 8); 2023 (Season 9); 2024 (Season 10); 2025 (Season 11)
South Africa	MasterChef South Africa	Andrew Atkinson (Seasons 1–2); Pete Goffe-Wood (Seasons 1–3); Benny Masekwameng (Seasons 1–3); Ruben Ruffle (Season 3); Zola Nene (Season 4–); Gregory Czarnecki (Season 4); Justine Drake (Season 4–); Katlego Mlambo(Season 5–)		M-Net	20 March – 14 July 2012 (Season 1); 11 June – 11 September 2013 (Season 2); 21 August – 11 December 2014 (Season 3); 28 February – 31 March 2022 (Season 4); 13 July 2024 – 23 November 2024 (Season 5); 22 February 2026 – present (Season 6)
South Africa	Celebrity MasterChef South Africa	Pete Goffe-Wood; Benny Masekwameng; Ruben Ruffle		M-Net	8 February – 10 May 2015 (Season 1); 30 November 2024 – 4 January 2025 (Season 2)
South Korea	MasterChef Korea	Kang Lee (Season 1–3); Kim So-hee (Season 1–2, 4); Noh Hee-young (Season 1–3); Kim Hooni (Season 3–4); Song Hoon (Season 4)		O'live	27 April – 20 July 2012 (Season 1); 10 May – 2 August 2013 (Season 2); 5 April – 2 August 2014 (Season 3); 3 March – 19 May 2016 (Season 4)
South Korea	MasterChef Korea Celebrity	Kang Leo; Kim So-hee; Noh Hee-young		O'live	22 February – 12 April 2013
Spain	MasterChef	Eva González (Seasons 1 to 6)	Pepe Rodríguez; Jordi Cruz; Samantha Vallejo-Nágera (Seasons 1 to 13); Marta Sanahuja (Seasons 14-present)	La 1	10 April – 2 July 2013 (Season 1); 9 April – 23 July 2014 (Season 2); 7 April – 30 June 2015 (Season 3); 6 April – 29 June 2016 (Season 4); 16 April – 28 June 2017 (Season 5); 22 April – 9 July 2018 (Season 6); 26 March – 25 June 2019 (Season 7); 13 April – 6 July 2020 (Season 8); 13 April – 13 July 2021 (Season 9); 19 April – 18 July 2022 (season 10); 27 March – 19 June 2023 (season 11); 1 April – 10 June 2024 (season 12); 31 March – 30 June 2025 (season 13); 30 March 2026 – present (season 14)
Spain	MasterChef Junior	Eva González (Seasons 1 to 6)	Pepe Rodríguez; Jordi Cruz; Samantha Vallejo-Nágera (Seasons 1 to 13); Marta Sanahuja (Seasons 14-present)	La 1	23 December 2013 – 6 January 2014 (Season 1); 30 December 2014 – 3 February 2015 (Season 2); 1 December 2015 – 5 January 2016 (Season 3); 20 December 2016 – 17 January 2017 (Season 4); 20 December 2017 – 10 January 2018 (Season 5); 23 December 2018 – 13 January 2019 (Season 6); 23 December 2019 – 24 January 2020 (Season 7); 15 December 2020 – 19 January 2021 (Season 8); 20 December 2021 – 6 January 2022 (Season 9); 11 December 2023 – 3 January 2024 (Season 10); 26 December 2024 – 9 January 2025 (Season 11)
Spain	MasterChef Celebrity	Eva González (Seasons 1 to 3)	Pepe Rodríguez; Jordi Cruz; Samantha Vallejo-Nágera (Seasons 1 to 13); Marta Sanahuja (Seasons 14-present)	La 1	6 November – 13 December 2016 (Season 1); 19 September – 21 November 2017 (Season 2); 9 September – 25 November 2018 (Season 3); 11 September – 27 November 2019 (Season 4); 15 September – 8 December 2020 (Season 5); 13 September – 29 November 2021 (Season 6); 12 September – 28 November 2022 (Season 7); 7 September – 30 November 2023 (Season 8); 9 September – 2 December 2024 (Season 9); 1 September – 17 November 2025 (Season 10)
Sri Lanka	MasterChef Sri Lanka	Danu Innasithamby	Peter Kuruvita (Season 1–present); Savindri Perera (Season 1–present); Rohan Fernandopulle (Season 1–present); Kapila Jayasinghe (Season 1–present)	ITN (Season 1, 2026); Swarnavahini (Season 2, 2026)	14 February – 9 May 2026 (Season 1); 18 July 2026 - present (Season 2)
Sweden	Sveriges mästerkock	No presenters	Leif Mannerström (2011–2020); Markus Aujalay; Per Morberg (2011–2013); Anders Dahlbom (2014); Mischa Billing (2015–present); Tom Sjöstedt (2021)	TV4	12 January – 20 April 2011 (Season 1); 9 January – 28 March 2012 (Season 2); 7 January – 10 April 2013 (Season 3); 6 January – 2 April 2014 (Season 4); 7 January – 1 April 2015 (Season 5); 13 January – 6 April 2016 (Season 6); 11 January – 5 April 2017 (Season 7); 11 January – 5 April 2018 (Season 8); 9 January – 3 April 2019 (Season 9); 8 January – 1 April 2020 (Season 10); 13 January – 7 April 2021 (Season 11); 5 January – 13 April 2022 (Season 12); 11 January – 5 April 2023 (Season 13); 10 January – 17 April 2024 (Season 14); 8 January – 16 April 2025 (Season 15); 24 August 2025 – present (Season 16)
Sweden	Sveriges yngsta mästerkock (MasterChef Junior Sweden)	No presenters	Leif Mannerström (2014–16); Markus Aujalay (2014–16); Tina Nordström; Danyel Couet (2017–present); Paul Svensson (2017–present)	TV4	
Switzerland	MasterChef Schweiz	Nik Hartmann	Andreas Caminada (2022–2024); Nenad Mlinarevic (2022–2024); Zoe Torinesi (2022); Elif Oskan (2023–2024)	3 Plus TV	14. February – 18 April 2022 (Season 1); 9 May – 5 July 2023 (Season 2); 29 October – 18 December 2024 (Season 3)
Thailand	จูเนียร์มาสเตอร์เชฟไทยแลนด (Junior MasterChef Thailand)	Patiparn Patavekarn; Bunn Boriboon; Chatchaya Ruktakanit		Channel 3	Original series (Channel 3): 3 February – 2 June 2013 (Season 1); Revived series (Channel 7): 19 August – 9 December 2018 (Season 1); 22 September – 22 December 2019 (Season 2); 2 June – 8 September 2024 (Season 3)
Thailand	มาสเตอร์เชฟจูเนียร์ไทยแลนด์ (MasterChef Junior Thailand)	Piyathida Mittiraroch	Pasan Sawasdiwat; Kwantip Devakula; Pongtawat Chalermkittichai	Channel 7	Original series (Channel 3): 3 February – 2 June 2013 (Season 1); Revived series (Channel 7): 19 August – 9 December 2018 (Season 1); 22 September – 22 December 2019 (Season 2); 2 June – 8 September 2024 (Season 3)
Thailand	มาสเตอร์เชฟไทยแลนด์ (MasterChef Thailand)	Piyathida Mittiraroch	Pasan Sawasdiwat; Kwantip Devakula; Pongtawat Chalermkittichai	Channel 7	4 June – 24 September 2017 (Season 1); 4 February – 27 May 2018 (Season 2); 3 February – 9 June 2019 (Season 3); 21 February – 11 July 2021 (Season 4); 13 February – 19 June 2022 (Season 5); 11 June – 8 October 2023 (Season 6); 15 February – 31 May 2026 (Season 7)
Thailand	มาสเตอร์เชฟ ออลสตาร์ ไทยแลนด์ (MasterChef All-Stars Thailand)	Piyathida Mittiraroch	Pasan Sawasdiwat; Kwantip Devakula; Pongtawat Chalermkittichai	Channel 7	2 February – 2 August 2020 (All-stars 1)
Thailand	มาสเตอร์เชฟ เซเลบริตี้ ไทยแลนด์ (Masterchef Celebrity Thailand)	Piyathida Mittiraroch	Pasan Sawasdiwat; Kwantip Devakula; Pongtawat Chalermkittichai	Channel 7	1 November – 20 December 2020 (Celebrity 1); 3 October – 26 December 2021 (Celebrity 2); 9 October – 25 December 2022 (Celebrity 3)
Thailand	มาสเตอร์เชฟ เดอะโปรเฟสชั่นแนลส์ ไทยแลนด์ (MasterChef The Professionals Thailand)	Piyathida Mittiraroch	Pasan Sawasdiwat; Kwantip Devakula; Pongtawat Chalermkittichai	Channel 7	9 February – 1 June 2025 (Professionals 1)
Turkey	MasterChef Türkiye (MasterChef Turkey)	Öykü Serter (Season 1)	Murat Bozok (Season 1); Batuhan Piatti (Season 1); Erol Kaynar (Season 1); Mehmet Yalçınkaya (Season 2–present); Hazer Amani (Season 2); Somer Sivrioğlu (Season 2–present); Danilo Zanna (Season 3–present)	Show TV (2011); TV8 (2018–present)	2011 (Season 1); 1 September – 23 December 2018 (Season 2); 18 August – 30 December 2019 (Season 3); 17 July 2020 – 3 January 2021 (Season 4); 26 June 2021 – 14 January 2022 (Season 5); 1 July 2022 – 10 January 2023 (Season 6); 14 June 2023 – 7 January 2024 (Season 7); 14 June 2024 – 11 January 2025 (Season 8); 14 June – 6 December 2025 (Season 9); 7 December 2025 – 18 January 2026 (Season 10); 13 June 2026 - present (Season 11)
Ukraine	МастерШеф (MasterChef Ukraine)	Hector Jimenez-Bravo (Season 1–present); Mykola Tischenko (Seasons 1–5); Anfisa Chehova (Season 1); Janna Badoeva (Season 2); Tetyana Lytvynova (Season 3–8); Serhiy Kalinin (Season 6); Dmytro Horovenko (Season 7–8); Yelyzaveta Hlinska (Season 9); Volodymyr Yaroslavskyi (Season 9–present); Olha Martynovska (Season 10–present)		STB	31 August – 28 December 2011 (Season 1); 29 August – 26 December 2012 (Season 2); 30 August – 25 December 2013 (Season 3); 27 August – 24 December 2014 (Season 4); 26 August – 23 December 2015 (Season 5); 30 August – 27 December 2016 (Season 6); 29 August – 27 December 2017 (Season 7); 28 August – 26 December 2018 (Season 8); 30 August – 27 December 2019 (Season 9); 29 August – 26 December 2020 (Season 10); 28 August – 25 December 2021 (Season 11); 26 August – 30 December 2023 (Season 12); 10 February – 8 June 2024 (Season 13); 24 August – 28 December 2024 (Season 14); 1 March – 28 June 2025 (Season 15); 23 August – 27 December 2025 (Season 16); 7 March – 28 June 2026 (Season 17)
Ukraine	МастерШеф. Діти (MasterChef Junior)	Hector Jimenez-Bravo (Season 1–2); Tetyana Lytvynova (Season 1–2); Mykola Tischenko (Season 1); Dmytro Horovenko (Season 2)		STB	3 February – 25 May 2016 (Season 1); 31 Januar – 30 May 2017 (Season 2)
Ukraine	МастерШеф. Кулінарний випускний (MasterChef Teens)	Hector Jimenez-Bravo; Tetyana Lytvynova; Dmytro Horovenko		STB	31 January – 30 May 2018 (Season 1)
Ukraine	МастерШеф. Професіонали (MasterChef: The Professionals)	Olha Martynovska (Season 5)	Hector Jimenez-Bravo (Season 1–5); Yelyzaveta Hlinska (Season 1); Volodymyr Yaroslavskyi (Season 1–5); Olha Martynovska (Season 2–4); Alex Yakutov (Season 5–present)	STB	2 March – 1 June 2019 (Season 1); 29 February – 18 July 2020 (Season 2); 6 February – 5 June 2021 (Season 3); 11 February – 17 June 2023 (Season 4); 22 August 2026 - present (Season 5)
Ukraine	МастерШеф. CELEBRITY (MasterChef Celebrity)	Hector Jimenez-Bravo (Season 1); Dmytro Tankovych (Season 1)		STB	12 June – 21 August 2021 (Season 1)
Ukraine	МастерШеф. Битва сезонів (MasterChef: All Stars)	Hector Jimenez-Bravo (Season 1); Volodymyr Yaroslavskyi (Season 1); Olha Martynovska (Season 1)		STB	22 January – 19 February 2022; 24 September – 24 December 2022 (Season 1)
United Kingdom (original country)	MasterChef (MasterChef Goes Large from 2005 to 2007)	Revived series: India Fisher (narrator)	Original series: Loyd Grossman (1990-2000); Gary Rhodes (2001); Revived series: Gregg Wallace (2005–2025); John Torode (2005–2025); Anna Haugh (2025–present); Grace Dent (2026–present)	BBC One (1990–2000, 2009–present); BBC Two (2001, 2005–2008)	Original series: 2 July 1990 – 3 July 2001; Revived series: 21 February 2005 – present
United Kingdom (original country)	Celebrity MasterChef	India Fisher (narrator)	Gregg Wallace (2005–2024); John Torode (2006–2025); Grace Dent (2025–present); Giorgio Locatelli (2026–present)	BBC One (2006–2011, 2013–present); BBC Two (2012)	11 September 2006 – present
United States	MasterChef USA	Gary Rhodes	two (various) celebrity judges per challenge	PBS	1 April – 24 June 2000 (Season 1); 7 April – 30 June 2001 (Season 2)
United States	MasterChef	Gordon Ramsay	Gordon Ramsay (Seasons 1–present); Graham Elliot (Seasons 1–6); Joe Bastianich (Seasons 1–5 & 9–present); Christina Tosi (Seasons 6–8); Guest Judges for each challenge (Season 7); Aarón Sanchez (Seasons 8–14); Tiffany Derry (Season 15–present)	Fox (in English)	27 July – 15 September 2010 (Season 1); 6 June – 16 August 2011 (Season 2); 4 June – 10 September 2012 (Season 3); 22 May – 11 September 2013 (Season 4); 26 May – 15 September 2014 (Season 5); 20 May – 16 September 2015 (Season 6); 1 June – 14 September 2016 (Season 7); 31 May – 20 September 2017 (Season 8); 30 May – 19 September 2018 (Season 9); 29 May – 18 September 2019 (Season 10); 2 June – 15 September 2021 (Season 11); 25 May – 14 September 2022 (Season 12); 24 May – 20 September 2023 (Season 13); 29 May – 18 September 2024 (Season 14); 21 May – 17 September 2025 (Season 15); 15 April 2026 – present (Season 16)
United States	MasterChef Junior	Gordon Ramsay	Gordon Ramsay (Seasons 1–present); Graham Elliot (Seasons 1–4); Christina Tosi (Seasons 4–7); Joe Bastianich (Seasons 1–3 & 6); Guest Judges for each challenge (Season 5); Aarón Sanchez (Seasons 7–present); Daphne Oz (Seasons 8–present); Tilly Ramsay (Season 9)	Fox (in English)	27 September – 28 November 2013 (Season 1); 4 November – 16 December 2014 (Season 2); 6 January – 24 February 2015 (Season 3); 6 November 2015 – 29 January 2016 (Season 4); 9 February – 18 May 2017 (Season 5); 2 March – 18 May 2018 (Season 6); 12 March – 4 June 2019 (Season 7); 17 March – 23 June 2022 (Season 8); 4 March – 20 May 2024 (Season 9)
United States	MasterChef Latino	Aracely Arámbula	Benito Molina; Claudia Sandoval; Ennio Carota	Telemundo (in Spanish)	14 January – 8 April 2018 (Season 1); 19 May – 11 August 2019 (Season 2); 10 February – 19 May 2022 (Season 3)
Uruguay	MasterChef Uruguay	Diego González (Season 1–4); Eduardo Gianarelli (Season 5–present)	Sergio Puglia (Season 1–present); Lucía Soria (Seasons 1–3); Laurent Lainé (Season 1–present); Ximena Torres (Season 4-present)	Canal 10	3 April – 24 July 2017 (Season 1); 21 August – 11 December 2017 (Season 2); 2 April – 9 July 2018 (Season 3); 22 April – 5 September 2019 (Season 4); 11 June – 18 December 2024 (Season 5); 16 June – 11 December 2025 (Season 6)
Uruguay	MasterChef: Profesionales	Diego González (Season 1–4); Eduardo Gianarelli (Season 5–present)	Sergio Puglia; Lucía Soria; Laurent Lainé	Canal 10	20 August – 27 November 2018 (Season 1)
Uruguay	MasterChef Celebrity	No presenters	Sergio Puglia; Ximena Torres; Laurent Lainé	Canal 10	1 September – 26 November 2020 (Season 1); 3 August – 9 December 2021 (Season 2); 19 April – 8 November 2022 (Season 3); 11 April – 8 August 2023 (Season 4)
Vietnam	MasterChef Vietnam: Vua đầu bếp	Phạm Tuấn Hải; Christine Ha (Season 3–present); Nguyễn Thị Kim Oanh (Season 2); Luke Nguyen (Seasons 1–2); Hoàng Khải (Season 1); Phan Tôn Tịnh Hải (Season 1)		VTV3	8 March – 19 July 2013 (Season 1); 19 July – 25 October 2014 (Season 2); 5 September – 12 December 2015 (Season 3)
Vietnam	Junior MasterChef Vietnam	Phan Tôn Tịnh Hải (Season 1); Alain Nguyễn (Season 1); Jack Lee (Season 1)		VTV3	2 October – 25 December 2016 (Season 1)
Vietnam	MasterChef Vietnam Celebrity	Phan Tôn Tịnh Hải (Season 1); Phạm Tuấn Hải (Season 1); Jack Lee (Season 1)		VTV3	22 October 2017 – 7 January 2018 (Season 1)

== MasterChef: Dream Plate ==
MasterChef: Dream Plate is a mobile game where the player takes the role of a MasterChef TV show contestant who cooks and presents dishes in competition with other contestants, using challenging ingredients and recipes. The dishes are judged by fellow players in real-time.

== See also ==
- Junior MasterChef
- MasterChef: The Professionals
- Plate of Origin
