= CTN =

CTN may refer to:

== Television ==
- bTV Action, a Bulgarian channel (formerly known as CTN)
- Cambodian Television Network, Cambodia
- Channel 31 (Sydney), which used the callsign CTN-31
- Christian Television Network, a Christian broadcast television network in the United States
- Chung T'ien Television, a television network based in Taiwan (formerly Chinese Television Network)
- Connecticut Network, or CT-N (often misidentified as CTN)
- MTVU, United States (formerly College Television Network)

== Transport ==
- Charlton railway station (National Rail station code CTN), London, England
- Compagnie Tunisienne de Navigation, a Tunisian ferry operator
- Cooktown Airport (IATA: CTN)
- Croatia Airlines (ICAO: CTN)

== Other uses ==
- ctn, an abbreviation for carton
- CTN (retail), Confectionery, Tobacco, and News retailers
- CTN Animation Expo, Creative Talent Network Animation Expo in Burbank, California
- ctn, a notation for the cotangent trigonometric function
- Camp Tel Noar, an American summer camp
- Cardiac troponin, see troponin test
- Central de Trabajadores Nicaragüenses, the Nicaraguan Workers' Centre
- Cryptologic Technician, a U.S. Navy specialist rating
