= MasterChef Cambodia =

- Genre: Cookery / Reality competition
- Directed by: S1-S2: Rothchan Amada; S3-S4: Sok Chanveasna
- Presented by: Jessica Elite Sethavrath
- Judges: Jessica Elite Sethavrath; Ren Nara; Sun Meng Hy; Su Sophorn Rithy; Sao Sopheak; Seng Sothea
- Country of origin: Cambodia
- Original language: Khmer
- No. of series: 4
- No. of episodes: 100

Production
- Executive producers: S1-2: Tim Scott; S1-2: Lim Sujin; S1-2: Poeu Sokunthea; S3: Rothchan Amada
- Production location: Phnom Penh
- Running time: 90–120 minutes
- Production companies: Endemol Shine International; Banijay Entertainment (2020-)

Original release
- Network: CTN
- Release: 19 August 2018 – present

MasterChef Cambodia (previously known as MasterChef Khmer) is a Cambodian competitive cooking reality show, part of the MasterChef franchise, open to amateur and home chefs. It premiered on CTN on August 19, 2018. The show is produced by Endemol Shine International.

== Plot ==
Amateur chefs compete to become the best amateur home cook in Cambodia through challenges issued by judges Ren Nara, Jessica Elite Sethavrath, Su Sophorn Rithy & Sun Meng Hy. The rest of the format is very similar to the U.S. version starring Gordon Ramsay.

Winners of MasterChef Cambodia will be awarded with ៛200,000,000 ($50,000) in grand prize money along with the MasterChef trophy and other prizes.

== Hosts and judges ==
Judges	Season				
Judges	1	2	3	4	Junior 1
Jessica Elite Sethavrath	✔	✔	✔	✔	
Ren Nara	✔	✔	✔	✔	
Su Sophorn Rithy	✔	✔			
Sun Meng Hy			✔	✔	✔
Sao Sopheak					✔
Seng Sothea					✔
Hosts	Season				
Hosts	1	2	3	4	Junior 1
Jessica Elite Sethavrath	✔	✔	✔	✔	
Sun Meng Hy					✔

== Series overview ==
=== Main seasons ===
Season	No. of Finalists	Episodes	Originally releashed		Winner	Runner-up(s)
Season	No. of Finalists	Episodes	Premiere date	Finale date	Winner	Runner-up(s)
1	25	25	August 19, 2018	February 3, 2019	You Thandara	Hay Chheanghok
2	25	25	August 9, 2020	January 24, 2021	Pech Sreynoch	Roeung Chanra & Tuy Sophea
3	25	25	May 26, 2024	November 10, 2024	Khoun Saom Orn	Lim Linda
4	25	25	June 8, 2025	December 28, 2025	Leav Leanghak	Seng Channavy

=== Spin-off seasons ===
Season	No. of Finalists	Episodes	Originally releashed		Winner	Runner-up(s)
Season	No. of Finalists	Episodes	Premiere date	Finale date	Winner	Runner-up(s)
Junior 1	18	18	July 12, 2026	November 8, 2026	Lin Yang Yang	Nan Vannakming & Wutthy Sethyka
