= Junior MasterChef Cambodia season 1 =

Junior MasterChef Cambodia
- Season 1
- Judges: Sao Sopheak; Seng Sothea; Sun Meng Hy
- No. of contestants: 18
- Winner: Lin Yang Yang
- Runners-up: Nan Vannakming & Wutthy Sethyka
- No. of episodes: 18

Release
- Original network: CTN
- Original release: July 12 – November 8, 2026

The first season of the Cambodian competitive reality television series Junior MasterChef Cambodia premiered on CTN on July 12, 2026.

Chef Sun Meng Hy return as judge for this season, along with 2 brand new judges are Head Chef of Lum Orng restaurant Seng Sothea and Private Chef World Cup 2025 winner Sao Sopheak.

The winner will receive a cash prize of 100,000,000៛ (US$25,000) and become a goodwill ambassadors for Khmer Beverages & Chip Mong.

The season concluded on November 8, 2026, with Lin Yang Yang as the winner, and Nan Vannakming & Wutthy Sethyka as co-runner-up.

== Top 18 ==
Source for names, hometowns and occupations: Ages and nicknames as given on air.

Contestant		Nickname	Age	Hometown	Status
លីង យ៉ាងយ៉ាង	Lin Yang Yang	Yang Yang	11	Phnom Penh	Winner November 8
ណាន វណ្ណៈមុីង	Nan Vannakming	Ming	12	Phnom Penh	Runner-up November 8
វុឌ្ឍីន៍ សិទ្ធិការ្យ	Wutthy Sethyka	Sethyka	10	Phnom Penh	Runner-up November 8
វណ្ណៈ នីហឬទ័យ	Vannak Niharatey	Haratey	11	Phnom Penh	Eliminated October 25
ជីវ អុីជិ	Chiv Ichi	Ichi	12	Phnom Penh	Eliminated October 18
ដូ វិសាល	Do Visal	Visal	13	Phnom Penh	Eliminated October 11
ភក្ដី ណុងណាពង្ស	Pheakdey Nongnapong	Napong	11	Phnom Penh	Eliminated October 4
ធី យ៉ានីន	Thy Yanin	Yanin	11	Phnom Penh	Eliminated September 27
សាន្ត សុម៉ារីដា	San Somarida	Rida	12	Phnom Penh	Eliminated September 20
អានីចេ មីលីង	Aniche Meyling	Meyling	11	Phnom Penh	Eliminated September 13
ជា ច័ន្ទវីរៈ	Chea Chanvireak	Vireak	11	Phnom Penh	Eliminated September 6
ពៅ ម៉េងហ៊ៅ	Pov Menghao	Menghao	11	Kandal	Eliminated August 30
សាន្ត សុម៉ារីកា	San Somarika	Rika	12	Phnom Penh	Eliminated August 23
ហេង ឬទ្ធីរាជ	Heng Rithyreach	Reach	13	Phnom Penh	Eliminated August 16
សៀង សុខម៉េងហេង	Seang Sokmengheng	Mengheng	10	Phnom Penh	Eliminated August 9
ចេង ចាន់ឫទ្ធី	Cheng Chanrithy	Rithy	13	Phnom Penh	Eliminated August 9
រ៉េត សំណាងដេវីត	Reth Samnang David	David	13	Takéo	Eliminated August 2
សូរ រិទ្ធីស័ក្តិ	So Rithysak	Rithysak	12	Kandal	Eliminated August 2

== Elimination table ==
Place	Contestant	Episode																							
Place	Contestant	4		5	6		7		8	9		10	11		12	13		14		15		16		17	18
1	Yang Yang	IN	IN	WIN	IN	LOW	IMM	IN	LOW	IN	IMM	WIN	IN	WIN	LOW	IN	IN	IN	WIN	IN	LOW	WIN	WIN	WIN	WINNER
2	Ming	IN	IN	PT	IN	LOW	IMM	WIN	WIN	WIN	IMM	WIN	IN	IN	WIN	HIGH	LOW	WIN	LOW	IN	IN	IN	LOW	IN	RUNNER-UP
2	Sethyka	IN	IN	LOW	IN	IN	IMM	IN	PT	IN	IMM	PT	IN	LOW	WIN	WIN	IMM	IN	IN	IN	WIN	IN	IN	WIN	RUNNER-UP
4	Haratey	IN	WIN	PT	IN	IN	IMM	WIN	PT	HIGH	IN	PT	IN	LOW	PT	IN	LOW	IN	IN	WIN	IN	IN	ELIM		
5	Ichi	IN	IN	WIN	IN	IN	IMM	IN	WIN	IN	IN	WIN	IN	WIN	WIN	IN	IN	IN	LOW	IN	ELIM				
6	Visal	HIGH	IN	WIN	WIN	IMM	IMM	IN	PT	HIGH	LOW	WIN	HIGH	IN	PT	HIGH	IN	IN	ELIM						
7	Napong	IN	LOW	LOW	IN	IN	IMM	LOW	WIN	IN	LOW	LOW	WIN	IMM	WIN	IN	ELIM								
8	Yanin	IN	IN	WIN	HIGH	WIN	WIN	IMM	WIN	IN	IN	PT	IN	IN	ELIM										
9	Rida	IN	IN	PT	IN	WIN	IN	LOW	WIN	IN	WIN	WIN	HIGH	ELIM											
10	Meyling	IN	WIN	WIN	IN	IN	IMM	LOW	PT	IN	WIN	ELIM													
11	Vireak	HIGH	IMM	PT	IN	IN	IMM	IN	WIN	IN	ELIM														
12	Menghao	IN	LOW	WIN	HIGH	WIN	IN	IN	ELIM																
13	Rika	IN	IN	WIN	IN	IN	IMM	ELIM																	
14	Reach	IN	IN	WIN	IN	ELIM																			
15	Mengheng	IN	IN	ELIM																					
15	Rithy	WIN	IMM	ELIM																					
17	David	IN	ELIM																						
17	Rithysak	IN	ELIM																						

(WINNER) This cook won the competition.
(RUNNER-UP) This cook finished in second place.
(WIN) The cook won an individual challenge (Mystery Box Challenge or Elimination Test).
(WIN) The cook was on the winning team in the Team Challenge and directly advanced to the next round.
(HIGH) The cook was one of the top entries in an individual challenge but did not win.
(IN) The cook was not selected as a top or bottom entry in an individual challenge.
(IN) The cook was not selected as a top or bottom entry in a Team Challenge.
(IMM) The cook did not have to compete in that round of competition and was safe from elimination.
(LOW) The cook was one of the bottom entries in an individual challenge, and advanced.
(LOW) The cook was one of the bottom entries in a Team Challenge, advanced.
(ELIM) The cook was eliminated.
