= MasterChef Celebrity =

MasterChef Celebrity may refer to Celebrity MasterChef a celebrity version of the British competitive cooking reality show MasterChef Goes Large or:

- MasterChef Celebrity (Spanish TV series)
- MasterChef Celebrity (Argentine TV series)
- MasterChef Celebridades from Brazil
- MasterChef Celebrity (Colombia)
- MasterChef Korea Celebrity
- MasterChef Selebriti Malaysia
- Celebrity MasterChef Australia
- Celebrity MasterChef (Indian TV series)
- Celebrity MasterChef (Romanian TV series)
