= MasterChef China =

Chinese television cooking reality show

- Chinese: 顶级厨师; Dǐngjí Chúshī
- Judges: Cao Kefan; Steven Liu Yi Fan; Jereme Leung Ji-gang (2013); Jonathan Lee Tsung-sheng (2012)
- Country of origin: China
- Original language: Mandarin

Production
- Executive producers: Chen Yi; Chad Grochowski; Karen Yan
- Production companies: Shine Group; Boxtop Studio

Original release
- Network: Dragon TV
- Release: 29 July 2012 – 4 April 2013

Related
- MasterChef

MasterChef China is a Chinese television cooking reality show and a based on from the original British MasterChef. The show is sponsored by Joyoung and Zwiliing. Contestants from all over China have competed on the show. It is a stage where ordinary people can realize their culinary dreams and show their love for food and cooking. What the contestants are faced with are weekly eliminations as well as team challenges. Fairmont Peace Hotel Executive Chef Steven Liu, popular host and "Professional Eater" Cao Kefan and the musician Jonathan Lee Tsung-sheng serve as the main judges of MasterChef China. The first season aired on 29 July 2012 Dragon TV.

== Judges ==
- Steven Liu – Executive Chef of Peace Hotel in Shanghai
- Cao Kefan – "Professional Eater" from Wuxi
- Jonathan Lee – Taiwanese musician

== Contestants ==
Contestant	Age	Hometown	Occupation	Status
Wei Han 魏瀚	25	Chengdu, Sichuan	French-speaking Tour Guide	Winner
Gu Xiaoguang 顾晓光	45	Shanghai	Self-employed	Runner-Up
Yu Hanbing 于寒冰	34	Chongqing	Self-employed	Eliminated; 14 October
Yi Min 易敏	35	Wuhan, Hubei	Housewife	Eliminated; 14 October
Li Liang 李靚	30	Beijing	Freelancer	Eliminated; 7 October
Fan Tiantian 范湉湉	32	Nanjing, Jiangsu	Public Relations Officer	Eliminated; 23 September
Mei Xiaofan 梅晓璠	20	Wuhan, Hubei	Nurse	Eliminated; 16 September
Huang Ying 黃莺	47	Kunming, Yunnan	CEO	Eliminated; 9 September
Liu Junjie† 刘俊杰	34	Wuhan, Hubei	Advertising Agent	Eliminated; 2 September
Kang Lu 唐璐	33	Chengdu, Sichuan	Shop Owner	Eliminated; 2 September
Cheng Yongbei 程永蓓	30	Shanghai	Artist	Eliminated; 26 August
Yang Xi 杨曦	26	Kunming, Yunnan	Lawyer	Eliminated; 26 August
Yu Tao 俞涛	17	Hangzhou, Zhejiang	Student	Eliminated; 19 August
Fang Meixue 方美雪	24	Shenzhen, Guangdong	News Anchor	Eliminated; 12 August
Cai Chengqi 蔡丞麒	31	Taiwan	Restaurant Manager	Eliminated; 5 August

== Formats ==
=== Preliminaries ===
In the first round of preliminaries, amateur cooks were chosen to cook their signature dish for the three judges. All three judges will taste all the signature dishes and give their comments. Then will vote either a "yes" or "no" for each dish. The contestant will be allowed to advance and earn a white MasterChef apron if he can get at least two "yes" votes.

The second round of preliminaries was designed to test the necessary basic skills that a chef should have. The contestants were required to slice and dice onions. Those who met the standards of the judges are allowed to advanced to the next round and the rest were eliminated.

In the last round of the preliminaries, the theme of the challenge was to create a stunning dish with a core ingredient in an hour. The hero of the dish must be the core ingredient.

=== Mystery Box Challenge ===
In this section, contestants are given different ingredients or a theme that they do not know in advance. They can choose to use all or some of the ingredients they want to make their dish with. The judges would only taste the dishes from the top three contestants and one of them would be chosen as the winner of the section. The winner of the mystery box challenge would receive an advantage in the next elimination challenge.

=== Invention Test ===
At the beginning of the invention test, three kinds of ingredients would be presented and the winner of mystery box challenge would have the advantage to decide the core ingredients in this section. Contestants can choose ingredients that they are familiar with or ingredients that would cause the other contestants to crumble. The other contestants can later choose any other ingredients in the pantry to help with the ingredient chosen. The contestants have 45 to 60 minutes to create a dish and the judges will decide the three worst contestants in this challenge. They would then compete in an elimination challenge, which is the pressure test while the other contestants would be safe in this section and go upstairs.

=== Pressure Test ===
This is an elimination challenge where the last three contestants in the invention test (or the losing team in the team challenge) will compete against each other. The loser in this section is to take off his/her apron, place it on his/her station and leave the competition. The contestants in this challenge would be given a particular recipe that they are required to try their best to imitate with limited time. When they finish, the judges will taste each dish and give their opinions. In the end, they will decide who has performed the worst in this section and he/she would leave.

=== Off-site Team Challenge ===
In this challenge, the contestants compete in two teams, blue and red. The number of members on each team is equal and they would be given a task, such as cooking for a party. There would be a third-party group of judges to determine the winner. The losing team would face an elimination test while the winner would be safe from being eliminated.

== Episodes ==
Episode 1 (29 July 2012) – Sixty-five contestants from all over the country were given the chance to cook their signature dishes and present them to three judges in Shanghai. All of them have the same goal – to earn a white apron. The 34 contestants who won the apron advanced to the second round of preliminaries – slicing and dicing onions which lasted for three and a half hours. Those who could not get the judges' approval took off their aprons and were eliminated. 24 contestants advanced to the next round. The 24 contestants then had to create a dish with the core ingredient: duck. One contestant was eliminated in the end and there were 15 who stayed in the competition. Only 15 contestants prevailed and entered the MasterChef kitchen.

Episode 2（5 August 2012） – The 15 contestants who proved themselves in the previous episode continued pursuing the honor of Master Chef. They entered the kitchen and were introduced the "Mystery Box" challenge. Contestants can use all or some of the ingredients in the "Mystery Box" to create a dish. Mei Xiaofan was the winner of this challenge and had the advantage to choose the core ingredient for their "Invention Test" in the second round. They only had one hour to finish their dishes in the invention test. The two contestants with the best dishes in this round would be the leader in the team contest in the next episode (Li Liang and Fan Tian Tian), while the last three would have to enter the pressure test. In the last part, Mei Xiaofan, Cai Chengqi and Liu Junjie were required to cook the sample dish given to them. Cai Chengqi dropped out the contest halfway. Mei and Liu both survived.

Episode 3 (12 August 2012) -– The number of contestants dropped to 14 in this MasterChef episode. They continued their competition in Dunhuang, which was in Shanxi Province. The first round was the team challenge. Both teams were required to finish a main course, a dessert and a vegetable dish within two and a half hours. The two menus were fixed. Their judges were 51 local camel groomers.

Li Liang's red team breached the rules by providing an extra dish not stated in the menu, causing unhappiness in the blue team. However, the red team led by Li Liang still won in this part by one vote. Due to the breaching of rules, the judges asked Li Liang to choose 1 contestant in the red team to compete in the skills test with the blue team who lost. Li Liang volunteered himself as he was the team leader.

Fan Tiantian's blue team and Li Liang took the skill test in the second round. What they were asked to show was their knife skills by cutting pork. The last round was also a skill test. This time, the bottom three in the second round needed to make bean curd. In the end, Fang Meixue was eliminated.

Episode 4 ( 19 August 2012 ) -— 13 contestants survived from last MasterChef episode continued their cooking dream this time. The first round was still the "Mystery Box". The big box on all three judge's table confused all the contestants as to what was inside. The answer was seafood. Everyone was able use two kinds of seafood to make their dishes and the judges would only taste the best three out of them. Tang Lu got first in this round and she was given priority to choose the major ingredients in the next round—the Invention Test. They were requested to make a dessert in this test. Tang Lu and Yi Min won this round while Liu Junjie, Yu Tao and Yu Hanbing headed into the third round—the Pressure Test to make large intestines. Yu Tao was eliminated at the end of this episode.

Episode 5 ( 26 August 2012 ) -— 12 competitors were at the Sun Island Resorts to carry-on in the competition. The first round was the Off-site Team Challenge and the two leaders were Tang Lu and Yi Min. Their task was to make a children's menu including a meat staple, a vegetable dish and a special sugar painting because the judges in this round were 51 little children. Tang Lu's blue team beat Yi Min's team with a score of 41 to 10. What was waiting for the red team in next round was the Skill Test that included cutting salmon. Their salmon pieces needed to be cut to 160-180 grams. Wei Han was first to pass. The other five would head to the third round—the Pressure Test. The goal was to make Jonathan Li's homemade "Papa Pasta" after he showed them how to do it. Yang Xi and Cheng Yongbei lost their aprons in this episode.

Episode 6 ( 2 September 2012 ) – The major ingredient in the "Mystery Box" was Jinhua ham this time. All the ten contestants seemed to be confused by the ham. Wei Han got the first in this round which was beyond everyone's expectation. He was given the right to choose the major ingredients used in the next round—the Invention Test. Wei chose cow's tongue for himself and mutton kidney for the other contestants, which made him be questioned by them. Wei, Tang Lu, Huang Ying and Liu Junjie were chosen into the third round—the Pressure Test. The topic was making handmade beef balls. Tang Lu and Liu Junjie were both eliminated at last.

Episode 7 ( 9 September 2012 ) – In this episode, the eight remaining contestants continue the competition in the Fairmont Peace Hotel, which was once the 'domain' of Steven Liu. The first round was the team challenge. The winners of the last episode, Gu Xiaoguang and Li Liang were the two leaders in this round. Each team was required to cook two of the signature dishes from the Peace Hotel. With the excellent use of codfish, Wei Han led his team to victory in the team challenge. The red team was then faced with the skills test. In this round, their task was beating egg white. Gu Xiaoguang and Mei Xiaofan were the first two to finish the task. What waited for them was that round's plus question. Mei made Gu enter the second round with the other red team members——the pressure test. Huang Ying was eliminated in the end.

Episode 8 ( 16 September 2012 ) – The first round in this episode was the "Mystery Box". What was in the box this time was totally different from before. The seven contestants remaining were required to make a dish according to the word ' missing ‘. Contestants chose their ingredients first then they were told that they must exchange their ingredients with the contestant on their left. This was the turning point of the episode. Yi Min was victorious and was given priority to choose all the contestant's ingredients for the next round. She chose six parts of a pig's head plus the pig's tail. Yu Hanbing came in second in that round, which surprised many. Li Liang, Mei Xiaofan and Wei Han all faced the third round—the pressure test. Mei was eliminated in the end of the episode.

Episode 9 ( 23 September 2012 ) – Intense competition ignites between the six remaining contestants on this episode held at Tianbao Mansion, the last off-site Team Challenge venue of the season. Despite disputes between Yu Hanbing and Li Liang, their traditional Chinese dishes won praise from five gourmet judges, including Chua Lam, a renowned food critic from Hong Kong. Thus the other team, led by Gu Xiaoguang, had to face the skill test, which was to assess their cutting skills, turning a piece of tofu into a flower. Gu made it through, leaving Wei Han and Fan Tiantian to face the pressure test, in which they were supposed to tackle with the common ingredient of chicken meat. Eventually, Fan was eliminated.

Episode 10 ( 7 October 2012 ) – This episode began with the Mystery Box Challenge. Five survivors were tasked to prepare dishes of the five major styles of Chinese cuisine, and Gu Xiaoguang came out on top, gaining the advantage to skip the Invention Test in the next round. The other four constants, however, had to prepare something impressive out of plain-looking vegetables. Wei Han's convincing performance enabled him to skip the Pressure Test, in which the other three chefs were supposed to make a croque-en-bouche in 3 hours. It is a French dessert with a cone that's piled to the top with cream puffs, the making of which requires patience and attention to detail. Eventually Li Liang was eliminated due to the unsatisfactory shape of his pile of puff, despite its delicious taste.

Episode 11 ( 14 October 2012 ) – The last episode saw the birth of China's first-ever MasterChef. In the re-decorated kitchen, four competitors were divided into two groups. Gu Xiaoguang competed with Yu Hanbing, both dealing with fish, and Wei Han was paired off with Yi Min, both faced with prawns. In these semi-finals, Gu and Wei beat their rivals, stepping forward to compete with each other for the MasterChef title. In the final round, they had to prepare two dishes and one dessert in 2 hours, while their family and the previously eliminated contestants were watching upstairs. Wei's strategy in this final challenge was to cook completely in the Chinese style, whereas Gu preferred a mixed style. Opinions divided among the 5 gourmet judges, including Chua Lam, who also appeared on the 9th episode, however, Wei's lobster and shrimp, crispy chicken and Chinese pastry beat Gu's cuttlefish, shrimp ball and French brûlée. In the end, Wei Han was crowned China's first ever Master Chef.

== Elimination Chart ==
Place	Contestant	Episode																			
Place	Contestant	2		3		4		5		6		7		8		9		10		11	
1	Han	IN	IN	LOSE	IN	IN	IN	LOSE	IN	WIN	PT	WIN	IMM	IN	PT	LOSE	PT	HIGH	IN	IN	WINNER
2	Xiaoguang	HIGH	IN	LOSE	IN	IN	IN	WIN	IMM	HIGH	WIN	LOSE	PT	HIGH	IN	LOSE	IN	WIN	IMM	IN	RUNNER-UP
3	Min	HIGH	IN	WIN	IMM	IN	WIN	LOSE	PT	LOW	IN	WIN	IMM	WIN	IN	WIN	IMM	LOW	PT	ELIM	
4	Hanbing	IN	IN	WIN	IMM	IN	PT	WIN	IMM	LOW	IN	WIN	IMM	IN	WIN	WIN	IMM	HIGH	PT	ELIM	
5	Liang	IN	WIN	WIN	PT	HIGH	IN	LOSE	PT	HIGH	WIN	WIN	IMM	HIGH	PT	WIN	IMM	LOW	ELIM		
6	Tiantian	IN	WIN	LOSE	IN	IN	IN	WIN	IMM	IN	IN	LOSE	PT	IN	WIN	LOSE	ELIM				
7	Xiaofan	WIN	PT	WIN	IMM	IN	IN	LOSE	PT	LOW	IN	LOSE	IN	IN	ELIM						
8	Ying	IN	IN	LOSE	IN	HIGH	IN	WIN	IMM	IN	PT	LOSE	ELIM								
9	Lu	IN	IN	LOSE	IN	WIN	WIN	WIN	IMM	IN	ELIM										
10	Junjie	IN	PT	WIN	IMM	IN	PT	WIN	IMM	IN	ELIM										
11	Yongbei	IN	IN	LOSE	PT	IN	IN	LOSE	ELIM												
12	Xi	IN	IN	WIN	IMM	IN	IN	LOSE	ELIM												
13	Tao	IN	IN	WIN	IMM	IN	ELIM														
14	Meixue	IN	IN	LOSE	ELIM																
15	Chengqi	IN	ELIM																		

(WIN) The cook won the individual challenge (Mystery Box Challenge or Invention Test).
(WIN) The cook was on the winning team in the Team Challenge and was safe from the Pressure Test.
(HIGH) The cook was one of the top entries in the Mystery Box Challenge, but did not win.
(IN) The cook was not selected as a top entry or bottom entry in the challenge.
(IMM) The cook won the previous challenge and did not have to compete in the next challenge.
(LOW) The cook was on the losing team in the Team Challenge, competed in the next challenge, and advanced.
(LOW) The cook was one of the bottom entries in the Mystery Box Challenge.
(LOW) The cook was one of the bottom entries in the Mystery Box Challenge, and received a penalty in the Invention Test.
(PT) The cook was one of the bottom entries in the Elimination Challenge, competed in the Pressure Test, and advanced. In Episode 3, as the Blue Team breached the rules of the challenge, it was decided that the leader of the Blue Team (Li Liang) would join the next challenge as well.
(ELIM) The cook was eliminated from MasterChef.
