= MasterChef Cambodia season 1 =

MasterChef Cambodia
- Season 1
- Judges: Jessica Elite Sethavrath; Ren Nara; Su Sophorn Rithy
- No. of contestants: 25
- Winner: You Thandara "Dara"
- Runner-up: Hay Chheanghok "Hok"
- No. of episodes: 25

Release
- Original network: CTN TV
- Original release: August 19, 2018 – February 3, 2019

Season chronology
- Next → Season 2

The first series of the Cambodian reality television series MasterChef Khmer began on 19 August 2018 and aired on CTN TV. The show was hosted by Jessica Elite Sethavrath. Elite was also joined by chef Ren Nara at Raffles Hotel Le Royal, and chef Su Sophorn Rithy at One More restaurant, as the judges of the show.

You Thandara (nickname Dara) was the winner of this inaugural season, with Hay Chheanghok (nickname Hok) as the runner-up.

== Top 25 ==
Contestant		Age	Hometown	Occupation	Status
យូ ថនដារ៉ា	You Thandara "Dara"	35	Phnom Penh	Gendarmerie Officer	Winner February 3
ហាយ ឈៀងហុក	Hay Chheanghok "Hok"	30	Battambang	Boxer	Runners-up February 3
យុឹម ផានីន	Yim Phanin	23	Phnom Penh	Food Dealer	Eliminated February 3
ចាន់ កញ្ញា	Chan Kanha	30	Phnom Penh	Housewife/Businesswoman	Eliminated November 25; Returned December 1 Eliminated January 27
ផាន់ ភារម្យ	Phan Phearom	32	Phnom Penh	Factory Worker	Eliminated January 27
ពៅ ដាឡែន	Pov Dalen	33	Phnom Penh	Housewife	Eliminated January 20
គីបុប្ផា សន្យា	Kybopha Sanya	23	Phnom Penh	Coordinating Staff	Eliminated January 13
ភ័ណ្ឌ សូនិតា	Phoan Sonita “Nita”	21	Phnom Penh	Interior Designer	Eliminated January 6
សំ បូទុំ	Saam Botom	36	Battambang	Housewife	Eliminated December 30
លី សុផល	Ly Sophal	29	Kampot	Housewife	Eliminated October 21; Returned December 1 Eliminated December 30
ស៊ុម ជាវណ្ណៈបូរមីណ៍	Sorm Cheavannah Boramei	35	Phnom Penh	Housewife	Eliminated December 23
អ៊ាង ដារិទ្ធ	Eang Darith	35	Siem Reap	Traders	Eliminated December 23
គឹម លក្ខិណា	Kim Leakna	36	Svay Rieng	Traders	Eliminated December 16
កា រ៉ូហានី	Ka Rauhany "Hany''	30	Phnom Penh	Hairdresser	Eliminated December 9
សុខ ម៉ៅ	Sok Mao	26	Siem Reap	Motorcyclist Washer	Eliminated December 2
គាត ធីតា	Keat Thida	36	Kampong Cham	Glass Cutting Business Owner	Eliminated November 18
ណែត ថារី	Net Thary	23	Takeo	Babysitter	Eliminated November 11
យឹម មឿន	Yim Meurn	29	Phnom Penh	Security Guard	Eliminated November 4
សេក សុណៃ	Sek So Nai	30	Kampong Speu	Migrant Worker	Eliminated October 28
វ៉ត សុខមាន	Vod Sok Mean	36	Siem Reap	Vendor	Eliminated October 14
សមិទ្ធិ ឃៀម	Khiem Samithy	61	Phnom Penh	Retired	Eliminated October 7
ពុទ្ធ ខួច	Pouth Khouch	31	Battambang	Trader	Eliminated September 30
យន់ ខសភា	Youn Kho Sophea	23	Battambang	Student/Restaurant Staff	Eliminated September 23
ឡាយ រីឆាត	Lay Richard	22	Siem Reap	Scholar	Eliminated September 16
ស៊ន ភាន់	Sorn Phon	44	Siem Reap	Housewife	Eliminated September 9

== Elimination table ==
Place	Contestant	Episode																																		
Place	Contestant	4		5	6		7	8		9	10		11	12		13	14		15	16			17	18		19	20		21	22		23		24		25
1	Dara	HIGH	IN	WIN	WIN	IMM	PT	IN	IN	PT	WIN	IMM	PT	HIGH	IMM	PT	IN	IN	WIN	IN	IMM	WIN	WIN	IN	LOW	WIN	HIGH	IMM	WIN	HIGH	WIN	LOW	IN	IN	IN	WINNER
2	Hok	IN	LOW	PT	IN	WIN	LOW	IN	LOW	IN	IN	IN	PT	IN	IN	IN	HIGH	IMM	WIN	IN	IMM	LOW	LOW	IN	IN	WIN	IN	IN	IN	IN	WIN	WIN	IMM	IN	IN	RUNNER-UP
3	Phanin	IN	WIN	WIN	IN	IN	NPT	WIN	IMM	PT	IN	IN	WIN	HIGH	IMM	IN	IN	WIN	WIN	WIN	IMM	WIN	PT	WIN	IMM	LOW	IN	IN	PT	WIN	IMM	LOW	IN	IN	LOW	ELIM
4	Kanha	IN	IN	PT	IN	WIN	WIN	IN	PT	IN	HIGH	IMM	PT	WIN	IMM	WIN	IN	IMM	ELIM		RET	IN	WIN	HIGH	WIN	WIN	WIN	IMM	PT	IN	IN	WIN	IMM	LOW	ELIM	
5	Phearom	IN	IN	PT	IN	IN	PT	IN	IN	PT	HIGH	IMM	PT	IN	WIN	IN	IN	IMM	WIN	HIGH	IMM	IN	WIN	IN	IN	PT	HIGH	IMM	LOW	HIGH	LOW	WIN	IMM	ELIM		
6	Dalen	IN	IN	WIN	IN	IN	NPT	IN	IN	WIN	IN	IN	LOW	IN	IN	IN	IN	IN	WIN	IN	IMM	IN	PT	IN	WIN	LOW	IN	WIN	WIN	IN	WIN	LOW	ELIM			
7	Sanya	IN	WIN	PT	IN	IN	WIN	IN	IN	IN	IN	IN	LOW	IN	WIN	WIN	IN	PT	LOW	HIGH	IMM	IN	WIN	IN	IN	PT	IN	LOW	IN	IN	ELIM					
8	Nita	IN	IN	PT	IN	IN	WIN	HIGH	IMM	PT	HIGH	IMM	WIN	IN	LOW	PT	IN	IN	LOW	IN	IMM	IN	WIN	IN	IN	WIN	IN	WIN	ELIM							
10	Botom	IN	IN	PT	IN	IN	WIN	IN	PT	IN	IN	LOW	WIN	IN	IN	WIN	WIN	IMM	LOW	IN	IMM	LOW	WIN	HIGH	WIN	PT	IN	ELIM								
10	Sophal	IN	IN	WIN	HIGH	IN	WIN	IN	IN	IN	IN	ELIM									RET	IN	WIN	IN	LOW	PT	IN	ELIM								
12	Boramei	WIN	HIGH	WIN	IN	IN	WIN	IN	IN	IN	IN	IN	WIN	IN	IN	PT	IN	LOW	WIN	IN	IMM	IN	PT	IN	IN	ELIM										
12	Darith	HIGH	IN	PT	IN	LOW	PT	IN	IN	WIN	IN	IN	PT	IN	IN	PT	IN	WIN	WIN	IN	IMM	IN	PT	IN	IN	ELIM										
13	Leakna	IN	IN	LOW	IN	IN	NPT	IN	IN	PT	IN	LOW	WIN	IN	WIN	PT	IN	IN	PT	IN	IMM	IN	LOW	IN	ELIM											
14	Hany	IN	IN	WIN	IN	IN	NPT	IN	IN	IN	IN	LOW	WIN	IN	IN	WIN	IN	WIN	PT	IN	IMM	IN	ELIM													
15	Mao	IN	IN	WIN	IN	IN	WIN	IN	IN	PT	IN	IN	WIN	HIGH	IMM	PT	IN	PT	PT	IN	IMM	ELIM														
16	Thida	IN	IN	PT	HIGH	IN	WIN	IN	IN	IN	IN	IN	WIN	IN	IN	LOW	IN	ELIM																		
17	Thary	IN	IN	PT	IN	IN	WIN	HIGH	LOW	LOW	IN	IN	WIN	IN	LOW	ELIM																				
18	Meurn	IN	IN	WIN	IN	IN	WIN	IN	IN	PT	IN	IN	PT	IN	ELIM																					
19	So Nai	IN	IN	WIN	IN	LOW	PT	IN	IN	PT	IN	IN	ELIM																							
20	Sok Mean	IN	IN	WIN	IN	LOW	NPT	IN	IN	ELIM																										
21	Samithy	IN	LOW	WIN	IN	IN	WIN	IN	ELIM																											
22	Khouch	IN	IN	WIN	IN	IN	ELIM																													
23	Sophea	IN	IN	PT	IN	ELIM																														
24	Richard	IN	IN	ELIM																																
25	Phon	IN	ELIM																																	

(WINNER) This cook won the competition.
(RUNNER-UP) This cook finished in second place.
(WIN) The cook won an individual challenge (Mystery Box Challenge or Elimination Test).
(WIN) The cook was on the winning team in the Team Challenge and directly advanced to the next round.
(HIGH) The cook was one of the top entries in the individual challenge but didn't win.
(IN) The cook wasn't selected as a top or bottom entry in an individual challenge.
(IN) The cook wasn't selected as a top or bottom entry in a team challenge.
(IMM) The cook didn't have to compete in that round of the competition.
(IMM) The cook was selected by Mystery Box Challenge winner and didn't have to compete in the Elimination Test.
(PT) The cook was on the losing team in the Team Challenge and competed in the Pressure Test, and advanced.
(NPT) The cook was on the losing team in the Team Challenge, did not compete in the Pressure Test, and advanced.
(RET) The cook won the Reinstation Challenge and returned to the competition.
(LOW) The cook was one of the bottom entries in an individual challenge or Pressure Test, but advanced.
(LOW) The cook was one of the bottom entries in the Team Challenge, but advanced.
(ELIM) The cook was eliminated from MasterChef.
