= MasterChef Cambodia season 3 =

MasterChef Cambodia
- Season 3
- Judges: Jessica Elite Sethavrath; Ren Nara; Sun Meng Hy
- No. of contestants: 25
- Winner: Khoun Saom Orn
- Runner-up: Lim Linda
- No. of episodes: 25

Release
- Original network: CTN TV
- Original release: May 26 – November 10, 2024

Season chronology
- ← Previous; Season 2 Next → Season 4

The third series of the Cambodian reality television series MasterChef Cambodia began on 26 May 2024 and aired on CTN TV. The show returned after a 3-year hiatus, with Jessica Elite Sethavrath and Ren Nara returning as judges. The late judge Su Sophorn Rithy was replaced by chef Sun Meng Hy for the third series.

The winner will receive a cash prize of 200,000,000៛ (US$50,000) and an opportunity to become the chef at the 5-star Hyatt Regency Phnom Penh Hotel.

The season concluded on November 10, 2024, with Khoun Saom Orn as the winner, and Lim Linda as the runner-up.

== Top 25 ==
Source for names, hometowns and occupations: Ages and nicknames as given on air.

Contestant		Age	Occupation	Hometown	Status
ឃួន សំអន	Khoun Saom Orn	23	Kindergarten Teacher	Phnom Penh	Winner November 10
លីម លីនដា	Lim Linda	49	Housewife / Garage Co-owner	Phnom Penh	Runner-up November 10
ឆៃ តារាម៉ាលីន	Chhay Dara Malin	29	Content Manager	Kampot	Eliminated November 10
ប៊ុន លីនណា	Bun Linna	24	Businesswoman	Phnom Penh	Eliminated November 3
សំ សុធារិទ្	Sam Sothearith	31	Food Content Producer	Phnom Penh	Eliminated November 3
គឹម ស្រីភក្ត្រ	Kim Sreypheak	26	Accountant	Banteay Meanchey	Eliminated October 27
កែវ វង្សច័ន្ទរស្មី	Keo Vong Chanraksmey "Raksmey"	33	Trader	Prey Veng	Eliminated October 13
សៅ វីល្លៀម	Sao William	38	Laboratory Manager	Siem Reap	Eliminated October 6
ចៅ ដាឡែត	Choa Dalet	29	Sculptor	Pursat	Eliminated September 29
ផល វណ្ណី	Phal Vanny	37	Pharmacist	Phnom Penh	Eliminated September 22
បូរី សិលា	Borey Seyla	36	Military Officer	Prey Veng	Eliminated September 15
តាំង យូជីញ	Tang Yuching	24	Student	Siem Reap	Eliminated September 8
កាក់ សីលាបញ្ញា	Kak Seila Panha	24	Police Officer	Phnom Penh	Eliminated September 8
ព្រាប សីរីល័ក្ខណ៍	Preap Sereyleak	29	Fitness Trainer	Phnom Penh	Eliminated August 25
ហួន រតនា សូរ្យពេជ្រ	Huon Rathana Soriyakpech "Pech"	32	Online Consultant	Phnom Penh	Eliminated August 18
ស៊ុយ នីតា	Suy Nita	20	Student	Phnom Penh	Eliminated August 11
នាង ឧត្តុង	Neang Oudong	24	Laboratory Doctor	Phnom Penh	Eliminated August 4
កង រចនា	Kang Rachana	22	Student	Phnom Penh	Eliminated July 28
ហាយ ហ្សង់	Hay Jean	29	Company Employee	Phnom Penh	Eliminated July 21
ញ៉រ រីម	Nhor Rim	26	Food Deliverer	Kampong Speu	Eliminated July 14
បូរ ស្រីនាង	Bo Sreyneang	32	Product Trader	Siem Reap	Eliminated July 7
មាស ច័ន្ទឌីណា	Meas Chandina "Dina"	30	Perfumer	Preah Sihanouk	Eliminated June 30
ដេត វណ្ណដូ	Det Vando	20	Classical Singer	Phnom Penh	Eliminated June 23
ប៉ែន សុគន្ធា	Pen Sokunthea	44	Coffee Shop Owner	Kampot	Eliminated June 16
កន រូច	Korn Ruoch	25	Primary School Teacher	Preah Vihear	Eliminated June 9

== Elimination table ==
Place	Contestant	Episode																																		
Place	Contestant	3		4	5		6	7		8	9		10	11		12	13		14	15		16	17		18	19		20	21		22	23		24		25
1	Saom Orn	IN	IN	WIN	IN	IN	PT	WIN	IMM	WIN	IN	IN	NPT	IN	IN	PT	IN	IN	WIN	IN	IN	WIN	IN	WIN	LOW	WIN	IMM	NPT	IN	LOW	WIN	IN	IN	IN	IN	WINNER
2	Linda	IN	IN	WIN	IN	IN	WIN	IN	IN	NPT	IN	IN	WIN	WIN	IMM	WIN	IN	IN	WIN	IN	IN	WIN	HIGH	IN	PT	IN	IN	PT	HIGH	LOW	PT	IN	PT	IN	LOW	RUNNER-UP
3	Malin	IN	IN	PT	IN	WIN	LOW	IN	IMM	WIN	IN	IN	LOW	IN	IN	LOW	IN	WIN	WIN	WIN	IMM	LOW	IN	PT	WIN	IN	IN	WIN	IN	IN	WIN	HIGH	LOW	IN	IN	ELIM
4	Linna	IN	IN	PT	IN	IN	PT	IN	IN	WIN	IN	IN	NPT	IN	IN	PT	HIGH	IN	WIN	HIGH	IN	WIN	WIN	IMM	PT	HIGH	IN	LOW	WIN	IMM	LOW	WIN	IMM	LOW	ELIM	
5	Sothearith	IN	WIN	WIN	IN	IN	PT	IN	IN	LOW	WIN	IMM	WIN	IN	IN	NPT	IN	HIGH	WIN	IN	IN	WIN	IN	WIN	WIN	IN	PT	WIN	IN	IN	PT	HIGH	PT	ELIM		
6	Sreypheak	IN	IN	WIN	IN	IN	WIN	IN	IN	WIN	HIGH	IN	PT	IN	IN	IN	IN	WIN	NPT	HIGH	IN	PT	HIGH	IN	WIN	HIGH	PT	WIN	IN	IN	LOW	IN	ELIM			
7	Raksmey	IN	IN	IN	IN	IN	WIN	IN	IN	NPT	IN	WIN	WPT	HIGH	IN	PT	WIN	IMM	PT	IN	LOW	WIN	IN	IN	WIN	IN	IN	WIN	HIGH	ELIM						
8	William	IN	IN	WIN	IN	IN	WIN	HIGH	WIN	NPT	IN	IN	WIN	IN	IN	WIN	IN	IN	LOW	IN	LOW	PT	IN	LOW	WIN	IN	LOW	ELIM								
9	Dalet	HIGH	IN	WIN	IN	IN	PT	HIGH	LOW	WIN	IN	LOW	PT	IN	WIN	WIN	IN	LOW	WIN	IN	IN	WIN	IN	PT	PT	IN	ELIM									
10	Vanny	WIN	IMM	WIN	IN	IN	WIN	IN	IN	PT	IN	IN	WIN	IN	IN	PT	IN	IN	PT	IN	WIN	IMM	IN	IN	ELIM											
11	Seyla	IN	WIN	IN	IN	IN	WIN	IN	IN	WIN	HIGH	IN	WIN	IN	IN	IN	IN	HIGH	WIN	IN	IN	PT	IN	ELIM												
12	Yuching	IN	LOW	WIN	HIGH	WIN	WIN	IN	IN	NPT	IN	LOW	WIN	IN	LOW	IN	IN	LOW	NPT	IN	IN	ELIM														
13	Panha	IN	IN	IN	IN	IN	PT	IN	IN	PT	IN	WIN	PT	HIGH	WIN	IN	IN	IN	NPT	IN	LOW	ELIM														
14	Sereyleak	IN	IN	WIN	HIGH	LOW	WIN	IN	IN	LOW	IN	IN	PT	IN	WIN	PT	IN	IN	ELIM																	
15	Pech	IN	IN	PT	WIN	IMM	PT	IN	IN	WIN	IN	IN	PT	IN	LOW	WIN	HIGH	ELIM																		
16	Nita	IN	IN	IN	IN	IN	PT	IN	WIN	WIN	IN	IN	WIN	IN	WIN	ELIM																				
17	Oudong	IN	LOW	WIN	IN	IMM	PT	IN	LOW	PT	IN	IN	WIN	IN	ELIM																					
18	Rachana	IN	IN	PT	IN	LOW	PT	IN	IN	WIN	IN	IN	ELIM																							
19	Jean	IN	IN	WIN	IN	IN	WIN	IN	IN	WIN	IN	ELIM																								
20	Rim	IN	IN	IN	IN	IN	WIN	IN	IN	ELIM																										
21	Sreyneang	IN	WIN	WIN	IN	IN	WIN	IN	ELIM																											
22	Dina	IN	IN	IN	IN	IN	ELIM																													
23	Vando	IN	WIN	LOW	IN	ELIM																														
24	Sokunthea	HIGH	IN	ELIM																																
25	Ruoch	IN	ELIM																																	

(WINNER) This cook won the competition.
(RUNNER-UP) This cook finished in second place.
(WIN) The cook won an individual challenge (Mystery Box Challenge or Elimination Test).
(WIN) The cook was on the winning team in the Team Challenge and directly advanced to the next round.
(HIGH) The cook was one of the top entries in the individual challenge but didn't win.
(IN) The cook wasn't selected as a top or bottom entry in an individual challenge.
(IN) The cook wasn't selected as a top or bottom entry in a team challenge.
(IMM) The cook didn't have to compete in that round of the competition.
(IMM) The cook was selected by Mystery Box Challenge winner and didn't have to compete in the Elimination Test.
(PT) The cook was on the losing team in the Team Challenge and competed in the Pressure Test, and advanced.
(WPT) The cook was on the winning team in the Team Challenge, but still competed in the Pressure Challenge, and advanced.
(NPT) The cook was on the losing team in the Team Challenge, did not compete in the Pressure Test, and advanced.
(LOW) The cook was one of the bottom entries in an individual challenge or Pressure Test, but advanced.
(ELIM) The cook was eliminated from MasterChef.
