= MasterChef Cambodia season 2 =

MasterChef Cambodia
- Season 2
- Judges: Jessica Elite Sethavrath; Ren Nara; Su Sophorn Rithy
- No. of contestants: 25
- Winner: Pech Sreynoch
- Runners-up: Roeung Chanra & Tuy Sophea
- No. of episodes: 25

Release
- Original network: CTN TV
- Original release: August 9, 2020 – January 24, 2021

Season chronology
- ← Previous; Season 1 Next → Season 3

The second series of the Cambodian reality television series MasterChef Khmer began on 9 August 2020 and aired on CTN TV. Jessica Elite Sethavrath, Ren Nara and Su Sophorn Rithy returned as judges. This is the last season of MasterChef Khmer to feature Sophorn, before he died due to illness while the show still airing.

The season concluded on January 24, 2021, with Pech Sreynoch as the winner, and Roeung Chanra & Tuy Sophea as co-runner-up.

== Top 25 ==
| Contestant | | Age | Hometown | Occupation | Status |
|---|---|---|---|---|---|
| ប៉ិច ស្រីណុច | Pech Sreynoch | 20 | Phnom Penh | Student | Winner January 24 |
| រឿង ចាន់រ៉ា | Roeung Chanra | 28 | Banteay Meanchey | Migrant Worker | Runners-up January 24 |
| ទុយ សុភា | Tuy Sophea | 30 | Svay Rieng | Sales Staff | Runners-up January 24 |
| ពិន រីនណា | Pin Rinna | 23 | Koh Kong | Teacher | Eliminated October 25; Returned November 15; Eliminated January 17 |
| ជិម វិច្ឆិកា | Chim Vicheka | 19 | Siem Reap | Student | Eliminated January 17 |
| ឈុំ រ៉ាដូ | Chhum Rado | 32 | Siem Reap | Coffee Shop Owner | Eliminated October 25; Returned November 15; Eliminated January 10 |
| ឡាយ ជីវ៉ាន "សុច័ន្ទ" | Lay Chivorn "Sochan" | 35 | Siem Reap | Painter | Eliminated January 10 |
| ងួន សុគន្ធី | Nguon Sokunthy "Kunthy" | 32 | Phnom Penh | Coffee Shop & Restaurant Owner | Eliminated January 3 |
| ហេង គីមហ៊ាង | Heng Kim Heang | 30 | Phnom Penh | Civil Engineer | Eliminated November 1 Returned November 15; Eliminated December 27 |
| អ៊ូច និមល | Ouch Nimol | 39 | Battambang | Food Seller | Eliminated December 20 |
| ជួន ស្រីល័ក្ | Chuon Sreyleak | 27 | Phnom Penh | Civil Servant | Eliminated December 13 |
| លឹម ឈូករ័ត្ន | Lim Chhoukrath† | 28 | Oddar Meanchey | Migrant Worker | Eliminated December 6 |
| ញាណ ចំរុង | Nhean Chamrong | 38 | Phnom Penh | Housewife/Children's Book Writer | Eliminated November 29 |
| ម៉ៅ ម៉ុត | Mao Mot | 36 | Battambang | Military Officer | Eliminated November 29 |
| ហួត យូរ៉ា | Huot Yura | 28 | Kandal | Porridge Shop Owner | Eliminated November 29 |
| ធន់ រ័ត្ននា | Thorn Rathana | 23 | Pursat | Food Seller | Eliminated November 8 Returned November 15; Eliminated November 15 |
| ផល សុភា | Phal Sophea | 27 | Kampot | Volunteer Teacher | Eliminated October 18 |
| គីម សុធារី | Kim Sotheary "Theary" | 37 | Phnom Penh | Police Officer | Eliminated October 11 |
| មាស សុគន្ធផារី | Meas Sokunphary "Phary" | 31 | Phnom Penh | Airline Employee | Eliminated October 4 |
| ឡេង ស្រីនាង | Leng Sreyneang | 19 | Phnom Penh | Student | Eliminated September 27 |
| សុន ស្រីនីត | Son Sreynith | 19 | Siem Reap | Student | Eliminated September 20 |
| សុខ បុណ្យព្រះជន្ | Sok Bonpreakchun "Preakchun" | 23 | Tboung Khmum | Restaurant Worker | Eliminated September 13 |
| លិវ អំណត់ | Liv Amnatt | 32 | Kratié | Teacher | Eliminated September 6 |
| ហេង កុសល | Heng Kosal | 23 | Kandal | Restaurant Worker | Eliminated August 30 |
| ចាន់ កន្នថា | Chan Kanitha | 32 | Phnom Penh | Company Employee | Eliminated August 23 |

== Elimination table ==
| Place | Contestant | Episode | | | | | | | | | | | | | | | | | | | | | | | | | | | | | | | | | | |
| Place | Contestant | 3 | | 4 | 5 | | 6 | 7 | | 8 | 9 | | 10 | 11 | | 12 | 13 | | 14 | 15 | | 16 | 17 | | 18 | 19 | | 20 | 21 | | 22 | 23 | | 24 | | 25 |
|---|---|---|---|---|---|---|---|---|---|---|---|---|---|---|---|---|---|---|---|---|---|---|---|---|---|---|---|---|---|---|---|---|---|---|---|---|
| 1 | Sreynoch | IN | IN | PT | IN | WIN | PT | IN | WIN | NPT | IN | IN | PT | IN | IN | PT | HIGH | IMM | PT | WIN | IMM | WIN | IN | PT | PT | WIN | IMM | PT | WIN | IMM | WIN | IN | LOW | IN | IN | WINNER |
| 2 | Chanra | IN | WIN | PT | WIN | IMM | WIN | IN | WIN | WIN | IN | IN | PT | IN | IN | WIN | HIGH | IMM | WIN | IN | IMM | PT | IN | PT | PT | HIGH | IMM | IN | WIN | IMM | PT | WIN | IMM | IN | LOW | RUNNER-UP |
| 2 | Sophea T. | IN | IN | PT | IN | IN | PT | HIGH | IN | PT | IN | IN | PT | IN | WIN | WIN | IN | WIN | WIN | WIN | IMM | PT | HIGH | IMM | PT | IN | IN | PT | WIN | IMM | PT | HIGH | PT | LOW | IN | RUNNER-UP |
| 4 | Rinna | HIGH | IN | IN | IN | LOW | WIN | IN | IN | WIN | IN | IN | PT | IN | IN | ELIM | | | | | RET | WIN | WIN | IMM | LOW | IN | IN | WIN | IN | IN | WIN | IN | WIN | LOW | ELIM | |
| 5 | Vicheka | IN | IN | PT | IN | WIN | WIN | IN | IN | WIN | IN | WIN | PT | HIGH | IN | PT | IN | IN | PT | IN | IMM | WIN | IN | IN | WIN | IN | IN | PT | IN | PT | PT | IN | LOW | ELIM | | |
| 6 | Rado | IN | IN | WIN | IN | IN | WIN | HIGH | IN | PT | IN | IN | PT | IN | IN | ELIM | | | | | RET | WIN | IN | LOW | WIN | IN | LOW | LOW | IN | LOW | LOW | IN | ELIM | | | |
| 6 | Sochan | IN | WIN | PT | IN | IN | PT | IN | IN | PT | WIN | IMM | WIN | HIGH | WIN | IN | HIGH | IMM | PT | IN | IMM | WIN | HIGH | IMM | WIN | HIGH | IMM | PT | IN | IN | PT | HIGH | ELIM | | | |
| 8 | Kunthy | IN | IN | WIN | IN | LOW | LOW | IN | LOW | PT | IN | IN | WIN | IN | IN | IN | IN | WIN | PT | LOW | PT | PT | IN | PT | PT | IN | IN | IN | IN | IN | ELIM | | | | | |
| 9 | Kim Heang | IN | IN | IN | IN | IN | WIN | IN | IN | PT | IN | LOW | PT | IN | LOW | LOW | IN | ELIM | | | RET | PT | IN | IN | WIN | IN | PT | WIN | IN | ELIM | | | | | | |
| 10 | Nimol | WIN | IMM | PT | IN | IN | PT | IN | IN | PT | IN | WIN | WIN | IN | IN | PT | IN | IN | WIN | IN | IMM | PT | HIGH | IMM | WIN | IN | PT | ELIM | | | | | | | | |
| 11 | Sreyleak | IN | WIN | IN | IN | IN | PT | IN | IN | WIN | IN | IN | LOW | WIN | IMM | IN | IN | IN | LOW | IN | IMM | WIN | IN | PT | WIN | IN | ELIM | | | | | | | | | |
| 12 | Chhoukrath | IN | IN | PT | IN | LOW | WIN | WIN | IMM | WIN | HIGH | IN | PT | IN | IN | WIN | HIGH | IMM | WIN | IN | IMM | LOW | IN | IN | ELIM | | | | | | | | | | | |
| 13 | Chamrong | IN | IN | LOW | HIGH | IN | WIN | IN | IN | WIN | IN | IN | WIN | IN | IN | LOW | IN | LOW | WIN | LOW | LOW | PT | IN | ELIM | | | | | | | | | | | | |
| 13 | Mot | IN | IN | PT | IN | IN | PT | IN | IN | LOW | IN | IN | WIN | IN | IN | WIN | IN | LOW | WIN | IN | IMM | WIN | IN | ELIM | | | | | | | | | | | | |
| 15 | Yura | IN | IN | WIN | HIGH | IN | WIN | IN | IN | WIN | IN | LOW | PT | IN | IN | IN | WIN | IMM | IMM | LOW | PT | LOW | ELIM | | | | | | | | | | | | | |
| 16 | Rathana | IN | IN | IN | IN | IN | WIN | IN | IN | WIN | IN | IN | WIN | IN | LOW | PT | HIGH | IMM | ELIM | | ELIM | | | | | | | | | | | | | | | |
| 17 | Sophea P. | IN | IN | IN | IN | IN | WIN | IN | IN | WIN | IN | WIN | LOW | IN | ELIM | | | | | | | | | | | | | | | | | | | | | |
| 18 | Theary | IN | LOW | WIN | IN | IN | PT | IN | LOW | NPT | IN | IN | ELIM | | | | | | | | | | | | | | | | | | | | | | | |
| 19 | Phary | IN | IN | PT | IN | IN | WIN | IN | IN | WIN | HIGH | ELIM | | | | | | | | | | | | | | | | | | | | | | | | |
| 20 | Sreyneang | IN | IN | WIN | IN | IN | LOW | IN | IN | ELIM | | | | | | | | | | | | | | | | | | | | | | | | | | |
| 21 | Sreynith | IN | IN | LOW | IN | IN | WIN | IN | ELIM | | | | | | | | | | | | | | | | | | | | | | | | | | | |
| 22 | Freakchun | IN | WIN | WIN | IN | IN | ELIM | | | | | | | | | | | | | | | | | | | | | | | | | | | | | |
| 23 | Amnatting | HIGH | IN | IN | IN | ELIM | | | | | | | | | | | | | | | | | | | | | | | | | | | | | | |
| 24 | Kosal | IN | LOW | ELIM | | | | | | | | | | | | | | | | | | | | | | | | | | | | | | | | |
| 25 | Kanitha | IN | ELIM | | | | | | | | | | | | | | | | | | | | | | | | | | | | | | | | | |

(WINNER) This cook won the competition.
(RUNNER-UP) This cook finished in second place.
(WIN) The cook won an individual challenge (Mystery Box Challenge or Elimination Test).
(WIN) The cook was on the winning team in the Team Challenge and directly advanced to the next round.
(HIGH) The cook was one of the top entries in the individual challenge but didn't win.
(IN) The cook wasn't selected as a top or bottom entry in an individual challenge.
(IN) The cook wasn't selected as a top or bottom entry in a team challenge.
(IMM) The cook didn't have to compete in that round of the competition.
(IMM) The cook was selected by Mystery Box Challenge winner and didn't have to compete in the Elimination Test.
(PT) The cook was on the losing team in the Team Challenge and competed in the Pressure Test, and advanced.
(NPT) The cook was on the losing team in the Team Challenge, did not compete in the Pressure Test, and advanced.
(RET) The cook won the Reinstation Challenge and returned to the competition.
(LOW) The cook was one of the bottom entries in an individual challenge or Pressure Test, but advanced.
(LOW) The cook was one of the bottom entries in the Team Challenge, but advanced.
(ELIM) The cook was eliminated from MasterChef.
