= Nicaraguan Workers' Centre =

CTN
- Nicaraguan Workers' Centre
- Central de Trabajadores Nicaragüenses
- Founded: 1962
- Headquarters: Managua, Nicaragua
- Location: Nicaragua
- Key people: Carlose Huembes, secretary general
- Affiliations: ITUC

The Nicaraguan Workers' Centre (CTN) is a national trade union center in Nicaragua. It was formed in 1962 as the Nicaraguan Autonomous Trade Union Movement (MOSAN), and changed its name to the CTN in 1972.

ICTUR reports that members of the CTN were subject to detention without charge by the Sandinista government.

The CNT is affiliated with the International Trade Union Confederation.
