= MasterChef Junior Albania =

- Genre: Cooking
- Directed by: Rezart Aga
- Judges: Sokol Prenga; Xheraldina Vula; Julian Zguro
- Narrated by: Redjan Mulla
- Country of origin: Albania
- Original language: Albanian
- No. of seasons: 1
- No. of episodes: 12

Production
- Running time: 120 minutes (including commercials)
- Production companies: Endemol Shine Group; RTSH

Original release
- Network: RTSH
- Release: 27 March – 12 June 2018

MasterChef Junior Albania is an Albanian competitive cooking game show. It is an adaptation of the Australian show Junior MasterChef Australia. It is a spin-off of MasterChef Albania, itself an adaptation of the British show MasterChef, and features contestants aged 8 to 14.

The first season premiered on 27 March 2018. The judges were Sokol Prenga, Xheraldina Vula and Julian Zguro. The winner of this edition was Denisa Qirici and the finalist runner-ups were Roelt Goxhabelliu, Aurel Domi and Fabian Menekshi.

== 1st season: 2018 ==
=== Top 16 ===
| Place | Contestant | Age | Status |
| 1st | Denisa Qirici | 13 | Winner 12 June |
| 2nd | Roelt Goxhabelliu | 12 | Runner-up 12 June |
| 3–4 | Aurel Domi | 12 | Eliminated 5 June |
| 3–4 | Fabian Menekshi | 12 | Eliminated 5 June |
| 5–6 | Arni Dhamo | 13 | Eliminated 29 May |
| 5–6 | Dea Çarçani | 10 | Eliminated 29 May |
| 7–8 | Jorgo Methasani | 13 | Eliminated 22 May |
| 7–8 | Amelia Kundraxhi | 13 | Eliminated 22 May |
| 9–10 | Loena Biraci | 11 | Eliminated 9 May |
| 9–10 | Borana Kapo | 10 | Eliminated 9 May |
| 11–12 | Fiona Totar | 12 | Eliminated 1 May |
| 11–12 | Juria Küma | 13 | Eliminated 1 May |
| 13–14 | Krisi | 10 | Eliminated 24 April |
| 13–14 | Enja Dervishi | 12 | Eliminated 24 April |
| 15–16 | Alesjo Burku-Maru | 13 | Eliminated 10 April |
| 15–16 | Joni Ruano | 10 | Eliminated 10 April |

== Elimination table ==
| Contestant | Week 1 | Week 2 | Week 3 | Week 4 | Week 5 | Week 6 | Week 7 | Week 8 | Final |
|---|---|---|---|---|---|---|---|---|---|
| Denisa | IN | Immune | Immune | Nominated | Nominated | Nominated | Nominated | Nominated | Winner |
| Roelt | IN | Nominated | Nominated | Immune | Immune | Nominated | Immune | Immune | Finalist |
| Aurel | IN | Immune | Nominated | Immune | Nominated | Immune | Nominated | Eliminated | |
| Fabian | IN | Nominated | Immune | Nominated | Nominated | Nominated | Nominated | Eliminated | |
| Arni | IN | Immune | Nominated | Immune | Nominated | Nominated | Eliminated | | |
| Dea | IN | Immune | Immune | Nominated | Immune | Immune | Eliminated | | |
| Jorgo | IN | Nominated | Immune | Nominated | Nominated | Eliminated | | | |
| Amelia | IN | Immune | Immune | Immune | Nominated | Eliminated | | | |
| Loena | IN | Nominated | Immune | Nominated | Eliminated | | | | |
| Borana | IN | Immune | Nominated | Nominated | Eliminated | | | | |
| Fiona | IN | Immune | Nominated | Eliminated | | | | | |
| Juria | IN | Nominated | Nominated | Eliminated | | | | | |
| Krisi | IN | Immune | Eliminated | | | | | | |
| Enja | IN | Nominated | Eliminated | | | | | | |
| Alesjo | IN | Eliminated | | | | | | | |
| Joni | IN | Eliminated | | | | | | | |
