= MasterChef Croatia season 1 =

MasterChef Croatia
- Season 1
- No. of episodes: 65

Release
- Original network: Nova TV
- Original release: 21 March – 17 June 2011

The first season of the Croatian reality television series MasterChef Croatia began on 21 March 2011 and aired on Nova TV, concluding on 17 June 2011 when Šime Sušić was crowned the winner. The season was hosted by Jasna Nanut.

== Judges ==
The judges in the first season were Tomislav Gretić, famous Croatian cook, Mate Janković, one of the youngest Croatian cooks and Radovan Marčić, director, writer and a food critic.

== Show ==
During the first two weeks, there were elimination rounds. Jury had to make a decision and choose the best 20.

The show was aired every week from Monday to Friday. Every Monday, the contestants got a "kutija iznenađenja" (Mystery Box). In the box, candidates got a few ingredients and they had to make a dish from these ingredients. The best contestant was awarded by selecting the main ingredient for the "test kreativnosti" (Creativity Test), which was every Tuesday. Candidate, who was the best in the test of creativity, was given the opportunity to cook versus one of the masterchefs in Croatia. The duel between the candidate and the chef was every Thursday. The three worst candidates in the test of creativity were given a penalty; "stres test" (stress test). Candidate, who was the worst in the stress test was eliminated. Every Friday, candidates were divided into two teams. Every team had a leader. The jury selected the leaders. Teams were taken to the challenge. Team that lost had to face a new challenge in the form of an elimination test. Candidate who was the worse had to leave the show.

Place	Candidate	Origin	Age	Interest
1	Šime Sušić	Zagreb	24	Student
2	Srđana Jevtić	Opatija	35	Student
3	Robert Predrag Žmire	Trogir	39	Waiter
4	Matija Nikolić	Zagreb	30	Manager
5	Vedran Beg	Koprivnica	40	Waiter
6	Davor Šreng	Zagreb	44	Artisan
7	Željana Ančić	Mokošica	24	Business economist
8	Ljubo Matulin	Donji Vidovec	42	Caterer
9	Bojan Končar	Zagreb	32	Unemployed
10	Ana Kovačević Pilepić	Viškovo	31	Designer
11	Marko Gajski	Nova Gradiška	26	IT Specialist
12	Nastasja Fišter	Zagreb	22	Student
13	Ivan Vučković	Zagreb	27	Travel technician
14	Mario Bobanović	Zagreb	39	Architect
15	Ivana Đokić	Čapljina	29	Food technician
16	Tea Đukić	Karlovac	25	Travel technician
17	Vesna Matulić	Zagreb	36	TV make-up artist
18	Igor Zdenjak	Zagreb	43	Instructor of sport fishing
19	Ivanko Rebić	Makarska	50	Fisherman
20	Tomislav Rusak	Varaždin	35	Bus driver

MasterChef Croatia
Weeks
	3	4	5	6	7	8	9	10	11	12	13	14
Šime	Safe	Reward	Safe	Duel	Safe	Safe	Bottom	Safe	Leader	Bottom	Penalty	Winner
Srđana	Leader	Safe	Safe	Safe	Safe	Reward	Reward	Safe	Reward	Penalty	Penalty	Runner-Up
Robert	Leader	Safe	Safe	Safe	Safe	Duel	Leader	Reward	Safe	Duel	Duel	Elim
Matija	Safe	Leader	Safe	Safe	Duel	Safe	Penalty	Safe	Penalty	Leader	Safe	Elim
Vedran	Duel	Safe	Safe	Safe	Reward	Bottom	Safe	Penalty	Duel	Penalty	Leader	Elim
Davor	Safe	Safe	Safe	Safe	Leader	Bottom	Safe	Penalty	Bottom	Safe	Elim	
Željana	Safe	Duel	Safe	Safe	Safe	Safe	Safe	Safe	Safe	Leader	Elim	
Ljubo	Safe	Safe	Leader	Reward	Safe	Safe	Bottom	Duel	Safe	Elim		
Bojan	Safe	Safe	Safe	Safe	Safe	Safe	Safe	Leader	Penalty	Elim		
Ana	Safe	Safe	Duel	Safe	Safe	Safe	Penalty	Leader	Withdraw			
Marko	Safe	Safe	Bottom	Leader	Bottom	Safe	Safe	Safe	Elim			
Nastasja	Reward	Bottom	Safe	Leader	Safe	Safe	Duel	Elim				
Ivan	Safe	Safe	Leader	Safe	Safe	Safe	Safe	Elim				
Mario	Safe	Leader	Bottom	Safe	Bottom	Safe	Elim					
Ivana	Safe	Safe	Bottom	Safe	Safe	Reward	Elim					
Tea	Safe	Safe	Safe	Safe	Leader	Elim						
Vesna	Safe	Bottom	Safe	Safe	Elim							
Igor	Bottom	Safe	Elim									
Ivanko	Safe	Elim										
Tomislav	Elim											

The contestant won the competition
The contestant was eliminated
The contestant was awarded by selecting the main ingredient for a test of creativity
The contestant was given the opportunity to cook versus one of the masterchefs in Croatia
The contestant cooked versus one of the masterchefs in Croatia and won and in that way got immunity.
The contestant was one of the team leaders
The contestant was one of the team leaders and was awarded by selecting the main ingredient for a test of creativity
The contestant nearly left the competition
The contestant was the worst in the challenge and got a penalty
The contestant was the worst in the challenge, got a penalty and was eliminated
The contestant was one of the team leaders and nearly left the competition
The contestant was awarded and got to select the main ingredient for a test of creativity and was eliminated
The contestant was awarded and got to select the main ingredient for a test of creativity and got a penalty
The contestant was one of the team leaders and was eliminated
The contestant was one of the team leaders and decided to withdraw from the competition.
