= Nelson Müller =

German cook

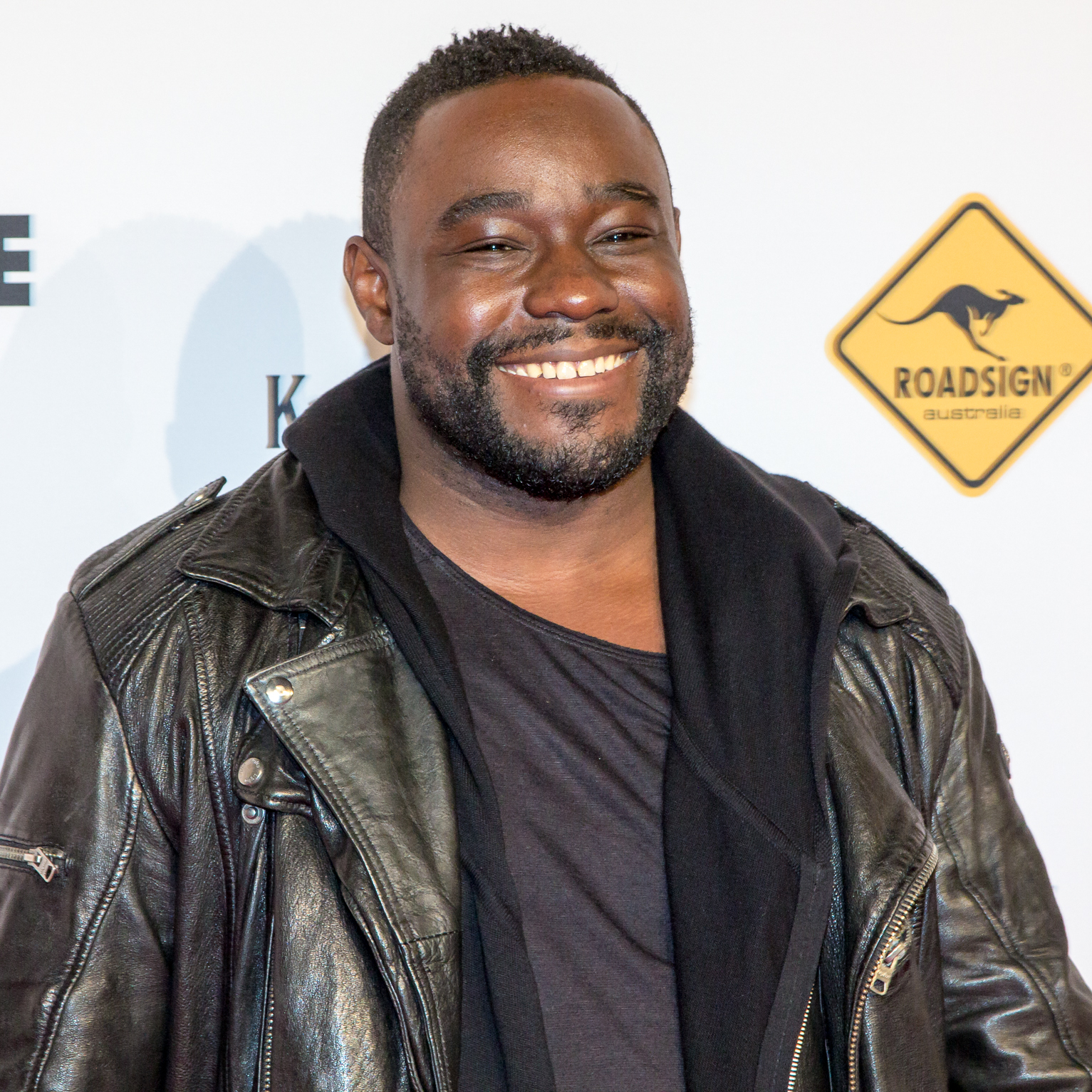
- Müller in 2015
- Born: Nelson Nunia Nutakor; 13 February 1979 (age 47)
- Occupations: Chef; Singer
- Website: www.nelson-mueller.de

Nelson Müller (born 13 February 1979) is a German cook, restaurateur and singer.

== Life ==
Müller was born on 13 February 1979, as Nelson Nutakor. He is the son of Ghanaian parents. He came to West Germany as a toddler, grew up in a German foster family in Stuttgart-Plieningen and attended a Realschule in Filderstadt-Bernhausen. He initially used the family name of his foster parents "Müller" as an artist name. In February 2013 he was adopted by his foster parents and officially took the surname. He maintains contact with his biological parents, who meanwhile live in London.

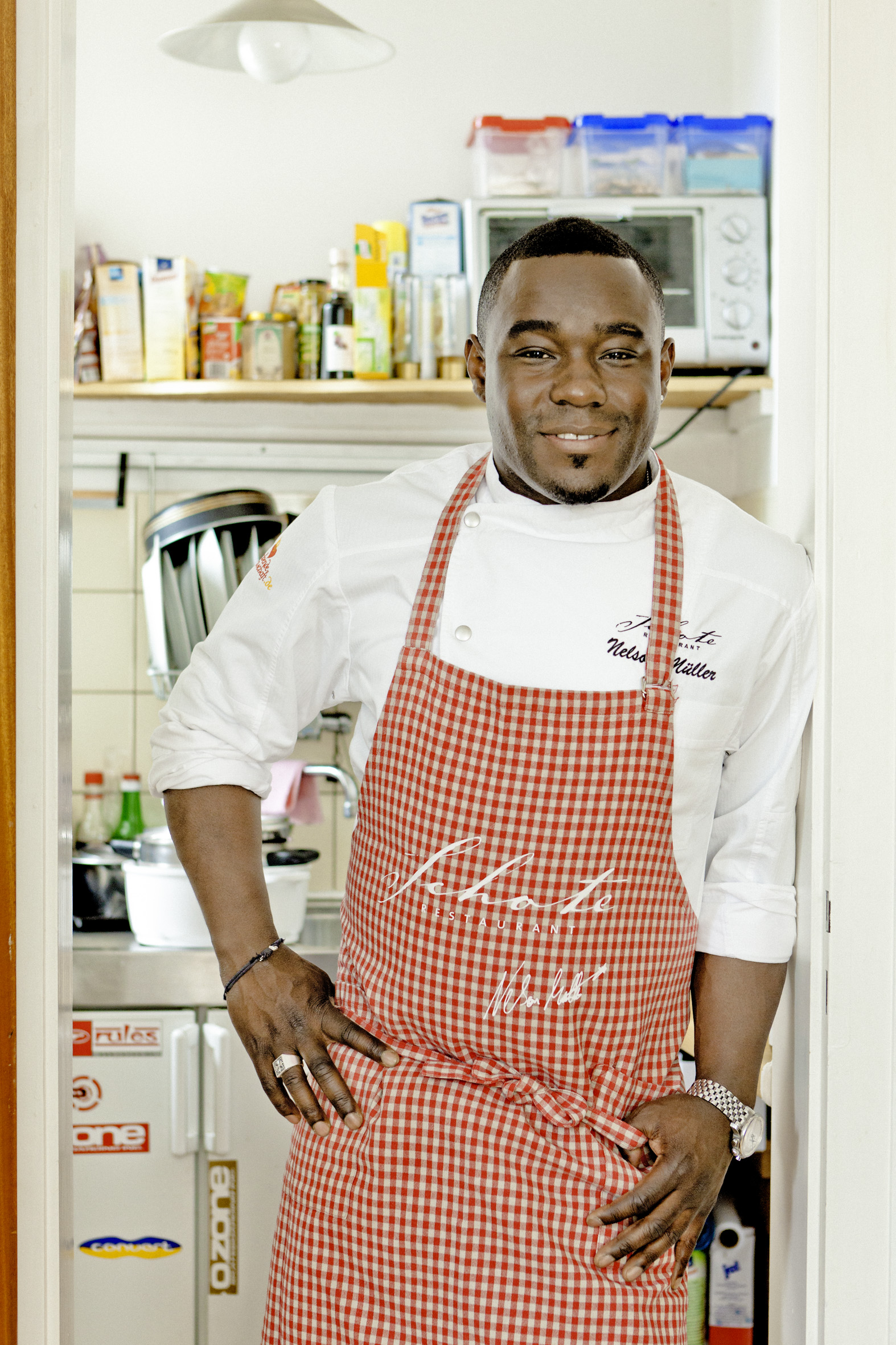
Müller in 2011

After training as a cook at the Fissler Post in Stuttgart-Plieningen and in Veneto under Holger Bodendorf in Wenningstedt on Sylt, Müller worked in the starred restaurants Résidence by Henri Bach in Essen and the orangery by Lutz Niemann in the Maritim Hotel Timmendorfer Strand. Since September 2009 he has been the owner of the Schote restaurant in Essen, which was awarded a star by the Michelin Guide in November 2011. In addition, since the beginning of 2014 he has been running Brasserie Müllers auf der Rü at Essen's Rüttenscheider Stern with specialties from the Ruhr area. He gave up the Wallberg restaurant in Saalbau Essen in March 2015 after six months. The Schote restaurant moved to a new location at the end of May. In June 2020, Müller also opened the Müller's Brasserie at the Burg in the Hotel Burg Schwarzenstein in Geisenheim, Hesse.

== Literature ==
- Meine Rezepte für Body and Soul. Zabert Sandmann, München 2011, ISBN 978-3-89883-300-4.
- Vorwort zum Buch Im Kochtopf um die Welt: Mit Panjo und Emmi von Europa nach Afrika, Amerika, Asien und wieder zurück. Ein Kinderkoch- und Erlebnisbuch. von Cookita e.V., Bo-Bo-Verlag, Bochum 2011, ISBN 978-3-9814448-0-3.
- Öfter vegetarisch: Echter Geschmack für Teilzeit-Vegetarier, Dorling Kindersley, München 2016, ISBN 978-3831029877
- Heimatliebe. Meine deutsche Küche. Dorling Kindersley, München 2019, ISBN 978-3-8310-3648-6.
