= Connecticut Network =

Government access television station in the State of Connecticut

- Country: United States
- Broadcast area: Connecticut

History
- Launched: 1999

Links
- Website: ct-n.com

The Connecticut Network, also known as CT-N, is a 24-hour Cable TV and internet streaming service that provides coverage of Connecticut state government and public affairs. Launched in 1999, CT-N is managed in partnership with the Connecticut General Assembly and The Connecticut Democracy Center (originally known as the Connecticut Public Affairs Network). While other past initiatives for covering official proceedings of Connecticut's State Legislature existed prior to 1999, CT-N represents the first 24-hour service focused on gavel-to-gavel coverage of all three branches of Connecticut state government and has run continuously since its launch. The network's scope of operations has expanded and contracted over the years and has at different points in time also included coverage of Connecticut elections, live anchored broadcasts and Election Night and Legislative Opening Day and a week-in-review program titled CT-N Capitol Report which debuted on Friday nights and ran continuously for 13 years. The network's focus on complete and balanced coverage without commercial interruption, editing or commentary has positioned it to be a window on Connecticut government and policy for many watershed events since 1999, including one governor's impeachment inquiry, political and policy responses to the 9/11 attacks and the Sandy Hook school shooting, as well as daily press briefings from the Governor's Office at the height of the COVID-19 pandemic.

== History ==
Following a successful 1997 pilot project of House and Senate coverage conducted by West Hartford Community Television in cooperation with the Office of Legislative Management, the leadership of the Connecticut General Assembly agreed to the construction of a television installation for what would soon be referred to as the Connecticut Network. Founding partners with the legislature included Connecticut Public Television, the state's Community and Technical College System and a new nonprofit organization called the Connecticut Public Affairs Network or CPAN, founded in 1998 by the former Assistant Executive Director of West Hartford Community TV responsible for the initial pilot. After several months of constructing a robotically-controlled TV facility within the State Capitol Complex, CT-N went on the air for the first time on March 10, 1999.

Beginning with a 4-hour loop of programming that repeated throughout the day, CT-N's programming expanded quickly from coverage of House and Senate sessions to include legislative committee meetings and hearings, executive branch agencies and, by 2001, oral arguments before the Connecticut State Supreme Court. While CT-N was viewable live and on demand 24/7 through the network's website, cable television availability would remain restricted in most areas to 4 hours a day until CPAN, in conjunction with the leadership of the legislature's Energy and Technology Committee, negotiated 24-hour Expanded Basic cable carriage statewide with the state's cable TV industry. In later years, CT-N would expand into "over the top" streaming with the launch of its Roku channel in 2016. In 2022, CT-N launched its first high-definition cable channels on Comcast systems statewide and currently makes all of its content available in HD.

Network staff utilize a combination of robotic and human-operated cameras to accomplish its ongoing coverage of legislative sessions, public hearings and committee meetings, press conferences, Executive Branch proceedings and oral arguments before the State Supreme Court. For many years, limitations on the capacity of CT-N’s physical plant limited the number of concurrent legislative events the network was able to cover. The onset of the COVID-19 pandemic in 2020 prompted additional investment by the General Assembly to allow simultaneous webstreaming from all 10 of the Legislative Office Building’s hearing rooms as well as capacity for televising hybrid meetings with in-person and webstreamed components.

Now in its 25th year of operation, CT-N has received two nominations for Boston/New England region Emmy awards and is the 2006 recipient of the Sunshine Award from the Society for Professional Journalists.
