= Celebrity MasterChef (Romanian TV series) =

- Also known as: Celebrity MasterChef România
- Based on: Celebrity MasterChef
- Presented by: Răzvan Fodor
- Judges: Cătălin Scărlătescu Sorin Bontea Florin Dumitrescu
- Country of origin: Romania
- Original language: Romanian
- No. of seasons: 1
- No. of episodes: 11

Production
- Running time: 120 minutes

Original release
- Network: PRO TV
- Release: 22 October – 24 December 2013

Celebrity MasterChef is a Romanian competitive cooking game show. It is spin-off of MasterChef România, itself an adaptation of the British show MasterChef, and features celebrity contestants. It began production in early 8 October 2013, and was broadcast on PRO TV on 22 October 2013.

== Format ==
In contrast to its parent show, the celebrity version is based around a heats and semi-finals format similar to MasterChef Goes Large, and is aired only once a week in a two-hour format.

Celebrities are split into groups of three as they compete in a heat round featuring two challenges, with one celebrity making their way from each heat into the semi-finals. The heats consist of an Invention Test, in which they prepare a dish of their own concoction, and a Pressure Test, in which they must complete a dish from a professional chef. Due to the difficulty of these dishes contestants are given a single "lifeline" in which the chef is able to aid them for 90 seconds.

The six remaining celebrities will then face further challenges in order to secure their place in the final.

== Cast ==
The series is judged by Florin Dumitrescu, Cătălin Scărlătescu and Sorin Bontea.

== Contestants ==
Contestant	Occupation	Status
Elena Lasconi	USR politician and journalist	Winner 24 December
Pacha Man	Reggae singer	Runner-Up 24 December
Don Baxter	Rapper	Third Place 24 December
Cătălin Josan	Singer	Eliminated 24 December
Alex Dima	Journalist	Eliminated 23 December
Gabriela Irimia	The Cheeky Girls singer	Eliminated 23 December
Jojo	Actress and singer	Eliminated 23 December
Laura Cosoi	Model and actress	Eliminated 23 December
Șerban Copoț	Animal X singer	Eliminated 17 December
Octavian Strunilă	Actor	Eliminated 17 December
Gina Pistol	Actress and model	Eliminated 3 December
Ioan Isaiu	Actor	Eliminated 3 December
Monica Irimia	The Cheeky Girls singer	Eliminated 18 November
Adrian Daminescu	Singer	Eliminated 12 November
Carmen Șerban	Singer-songwriter	Eliminated 5 November

== TV ratings ==
The show's premier received 8.3 share, which jumped to 17.8 in its second week.
