= Seng Sothea =

Cambodian chef and restaurateur

- Born: 1984 (age 41–42); Kampong Cham Province, Cambodia
- Culinary career
- Cooking style: New Cambodian cuisine, New Mekong Cuisine
- Current restaurant(s): Palate Angkor, Hot Stone Café (2014), Mahob (2014), Lava (2014) and Lum Orng (2019)

Seng Sothea (Khmer: សេង សុធា; born in 1984 in Kampong Cham Province, Cambodia) is a Cambodian chef and restaurateur. Owner of Palate Angkor, Hot Stone Café, Mahob, Lava and Lum Orng restaurants.

== Biography ==
Seng Sothea was born in Kampong Cham Province in a family of poor rice farmers. At the age of 10, he started helping his family in the kitchen with cooking and food preservation. In 1999 they moved to Siem Reap where Sothea started working as a waiter at the age of 15. A year later he got a job at the Sofitel Angkor Phokeethra as a kitchen hand and few years later started working at Le Méridien Angkor as chef de partie.

After being recommended by a friend to the hotel's head chef, Sothea went to Dubai to work for the Grand Hyatt. Afterwards, Sothea also worked for Andiamo, Indochine, and Manhattan Grill. In 2008 he returned to Cambodia and started working as an executive chef at Nest, then as an executive chef and F&B manager in Plantation Hotel in Phnom Penh and finally Metro and Hakkasan restaurants.

In January 2014 Sothea opened a barbecue restaurant Hot Stone Cafe in Siem Reap together with his wife Sonita Chou. The same year on July and November he opened his third restaurant Mahob serving Cambodian cuisine and fourth restaurant Lava serving Cambodian, Chinese and other Asian cuisine, as well as fusion cuisine. On 1 June 2019, in outer Siem Reap Sothea opened Lum Orng, Cambodia's first farm-to-table restaurant. In 2021 Lum Orng was one of three restaurants in Cambodia to be included in the Asia's 50 Best Restaurants' "Essence of Asia" list.
