= Cambodian Television Network =

- Type: Public
- Country: Cambodia
- Broadcast area: Cambodia; Thailand; Lao

Ownership
- Owner: Cambodian Broadcasting Service (The Royal Group)
- Sister channels: MyTV; CNC

History
- Launched: March 2003; 23 years ago

Links
- Website: www.ctn.com.kh

Cambodian Television Network (CTN) is a free-to-air terrestrial television channel launched in March 2003 as a joint venture between local conglomerate The Royal Group and Stockholm-based Modern Times Group. The network is now part of Mobitel.

CTN provides viewers with a variety of entertainment and educational programmes, which includes home-grown documentaries, computer learning programmes and sitcoms. The channel has also bought rights to Sunday English Premier League football matches, European comedies and Asian drama series and South American telenovelas. International news is transmitted to CTN's broadcast facility at Srok Takhmao via satellite from London, enabling the channel to offer international and Asian news. CTN is available through the website and mobile applications.
