= Indonesian Flavour =

National cooking show from Indonesia

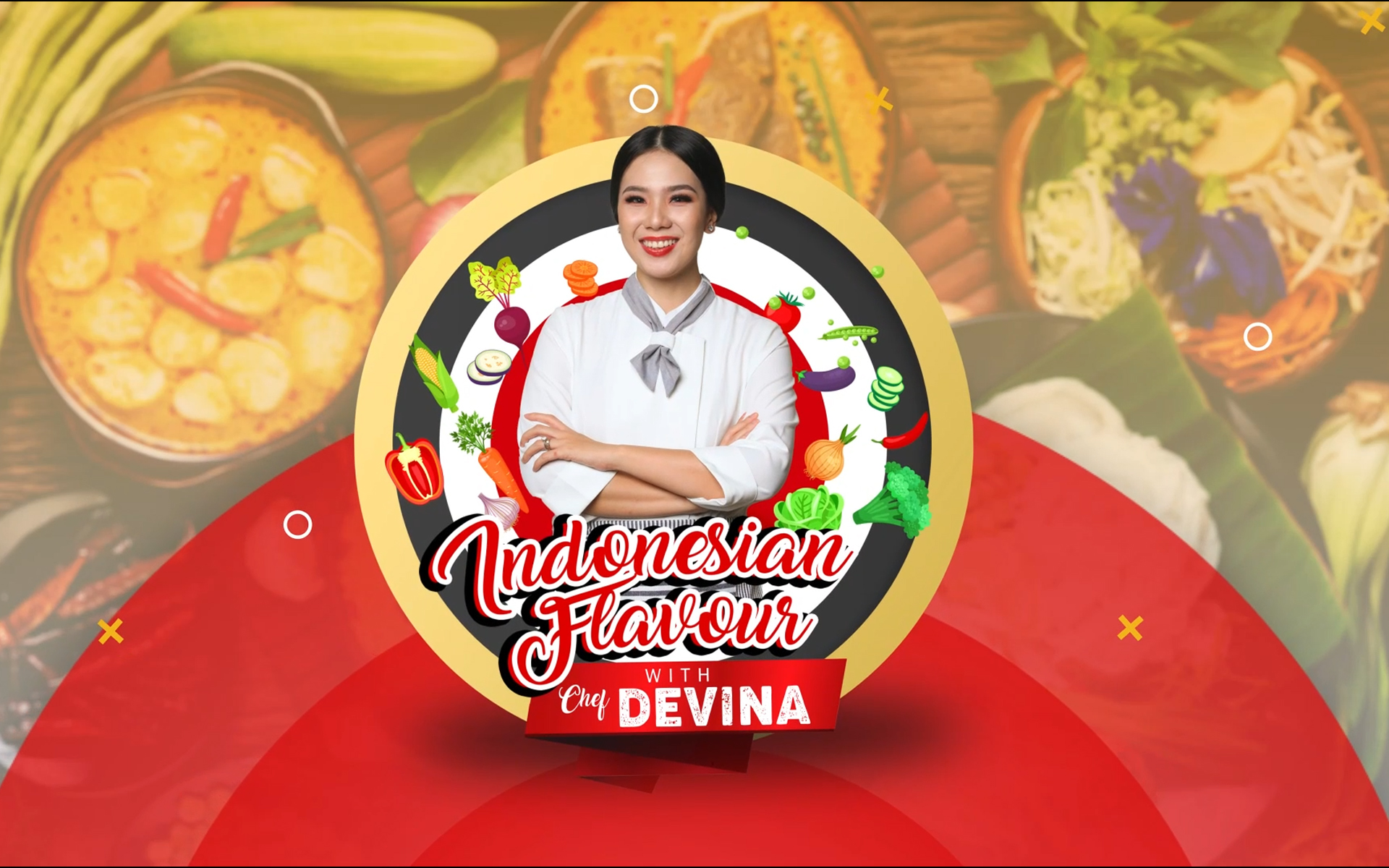
- Poster of Indonesian Flavour
- Also known as: Indonesian Flavour With Chef Devina
- Genre: Cooking show Educational; Edutainment
- Presented by: Devina Hermawan
- Country of origin: Indonesia
- Original language: Indonesian

Production
- Production locations: Bandung, Indonesia
- Camera setup: Multiple
- Running time: 24-28 minutes
- Production company: TVRI World

Original release
- Network: TVRI World
- Release: April 8, 2023 – present

Related
- Dapur Devina

Indonesian Flavour is an international cooking show from Indonesia presented by an Indonesian chef, writer, and cooking instructor, Devina Hermawan, more closely known as Chef Devina.

The first episode of Indonesian Flavour was aired on April 8, 2023. It will be subsequently broadcast every Saturday at 17.30 WIB on TVRI World, an Indonesian television channel owned by public broadcaster TVRI, which caters to both domestic and international audiences.

Indonesian Flavour will present various menus and recipes from different regions in Indonesia. Indonesian Flavour is Chef Devina’s second cooking program on television after Dapur Devina.

== Host ==
- Devina Hermawan
