= List of Iron Chef Indonesia episodes =

The following is an episode list from the second series of the Indonesian cooking show that based on the Japanese show, Iron Chef, known as Iron Chef Indonesia. The series began on 22 April 2017 and aired every Saturday and Sunday but started on 14 May 2017, this series was only aired every Sunday.

== Episode 1 ==
- Airdate: 22 April 2017
- Battles: Chris Salans (Iron Chef) vs Tommasso Paolo (Challenger Chef)
- Main Ingredient: Lobster
- Judges:
  - Bara Pattiradjawane
  - Rinrin Marinka
  - Ferry Salim
- Served Dishes:
  - Chris Salans:
    (1) Lobster Carpaccio Rujak
    (2) Lobster Bumbu Kuning
    (3) Lobster with Radish and Kecicang
  - Tommasso Paolo:
    (1) Lobster, Burrata and Squid Ink Rissoto Crackers
    (2) Surf and Turf (Chicken Cacciatore Fagotini with Butter Sauteed Lobster and Bisque Soup)
    (3) Wagyu Tenderloin, Lobster Tempura with Foie Grass, Vanilla and Lemon Potatoes
- Scores & Winner:

Chef	Round 1	Round 2	Round 3	Total	Winner
Chris Salans	24	52.5	56	132.5	Chris Salans
Tommasso Paolo	24	49.5	51.5	125	Chris Salans

== Episode 2 ==
- Airdate: 23 April 2017
- Battles: Sezai Zorlu (Iron Chef) vs Sam Wong (Challenger Chef)
- Main Ingredient: Turkey Meat
- Judges:
  - Sandra Djohan
  - Ricky Harun
  - Fenita Arie
- Served Dishes:
  - Sezai Zorlu:
    (1) Cop Sis Kebab
    (2) Tajin Koffe
    (3) Turkish Grilled Turkey
  - Sam Wong:
    (1) Shredded Turkey with Lemon Grass Dressing
    (2) Ini Yang Dumpling with Gansu Sauce
    (3) Triangle Noodle Lamien and Roasted Slice Turkey
- Scores & Winner:

Chef	Round 1	Round 2	Round 3	Total	Winner
Sezai Zorlu	21	55	55	131	Sezai Zorlu
Sam Wong	23	47	52	122	Sezai Zorlu

== Episode 3 ==
- Airdate: 29 April 2017
- Battles: Adhika Maxi (Iron Chef) vs Hans Christian (Challenger Chef)
- Main Ingredient: Purple Sweet Potato
- Judges:
  - Alexander Nayoan
  - Sandra Djohan
  - Daniel Mananta
- Served Dishes:
  - Adhika Maxi:
    (1) Purple Sweet Potato Mont Blanc Pie
    (2) Purple Sweet Potato Ravioli with Purple Sweet Potato Truffle Cream and Crab Caviar
    (3) Purple Sweet Potato Mille Fuille Gateux and Purple Sweet Potato Chantily with White Chocolate
  - Hans Christian:
    (1) Tuna Tartare with Purple Sweet Potato Jamu
    (2) Wagyu Beef Striploin and Purple Sweet Potato Cooked in Three Ways (Note: Steamed purple sweet potato with chicken stock and honey and purple sweet potato chips with purple sweet potato sauce) with Miso-Mustard Emultion
    (3) Flavours of Kolak
- Scores & Winner:

Chef	Round 1	Round 2	Round 3	Total	Winner
Adhika Maxi	27	48.5	51	126.5	Adhika Maxi
Hans Christian	20	49	45.5	114.5	Adhika Maxi

== Episode 4 ==
- Airdate: 30 April 2017
- Battles: Chris Salans (Iron Chef) vs Marjon Olguera (Challenger Chef)
- Main Ingredients: Salmon & Tuna
- Judges:
  - Yono Purnomo
  - Mullie Marlina
  - Ayushita
- Served Dishes:
  - Chris Salans:
    (1) Smoked Salmon Carpaccio with Cumin Leaves and Lime Juice
    (2) Tuna Tataki with Tabia Bun and Basil Sauce
    (3) Sesame Crusted Tuna with Exotic Fruit Salad and Sambal Matah-Kecombrang
    (4) Salmon Confit with Lemon, Turmeric and Kesum Leaves Dressing
  - Marjon Olguera:
    (1) Tuna Tartare with Wasabi Caviar, Ruby Grahpy Furitmiso Mayo, Fine Herbs and Lotus Chips
    (2) Tuna Tataki, Prawn Tempura, Green Papaya and Mango Salad with Spicy Broth
    (3) Tea Smoked Salmon, Chilled Herb Coddled Eggs on Toast with Oyster Sauce Broth
    (4) Roasted Salmon, Poached Yabbies, Asparagus and Shimaji Mushrooms with Vanilla Dressing
- Scores & Winner:

Chef	Round 1	Round 2	Round 3	Round 4	Total	Winner
Chris Salans	28.5	54	52	52.5	187	Chris Salans (2)
Marjon Olguera	24	42.5	48	48.5	163	Chris Salans (2)

== Episode 5 ==
- Airdate: 6 May 2017
- Battles: Sezai Zorlu (Iron Chef) vs Hamish Lindsay (Challenger Chef)
- Main Ingredient: Prawn
- Judges:
  - Bara Pattiradjawane
  - Amanda Zevannya
  - Ivan Casadevall
- Served Dishes:
  - Sezai Zorlu:
    (1) Karides Sabitasi Nar Eksili
    (2) Kuskuslu Karides Kebab
    (3) Karidesli Biber Dolmasi
  - Hamish Lindsay:
    (1) Baked Prawn with Nori Creme Fraiche, Wasabi-Onion Confit and Toasted Nori
    (2) Grilled Prawns with Sam Tum Salad, Nam Jihm Dressing and Dragon Fruit Caviar
    (3) Potato Gnocchi with Butter Sauteed Prawns and Asparagus, Burro Nocciola and Bisque Sauce
- Scores & Winner:

Chef	Round 1	Round 2	Round 3	Total	Winner
Sezai Zorlu	24	50.5	53	127.5	Sezai Zorlu (2)
Hamish Lindsay	23.5	47	51	121.5	Sezai Zorlu (2)

== Episode 6 ==
- Airdate: 7 May 2017
- Battles: Adhika Maxi (Iron Chef) vs Takashie Tomie (Challenger Chef)
- Main Ingredient: Pasta
- Judges:
  - Arimbi Nimpuno
  - Cathy Sharon
  - Aing
- Served Dishes:
  - Adhika Maxi:
    (1) Indonesian Aglio e Oglio (using Angel Hair Pasta) with Butter Sauteed Lobster
    (2) Cannelloni Pasta with Scallop Mousse and Indonesian Curry Sauce
    (3) Black Forest Raviolo Pasta
  - Takashie Tomie:
    (1) Three Kind of Pasta Temaki (filled with Wasabi Paste, Tuna and Scallop)
    (2) Uni-Ikura with Sauteed Red Chillies and King Mushrooms, Salad Pasta, Yuzu Dressing and Roasted Red Snapper with Miso-White Sauce
    (3) Roasted Wagyu Beef and Kuro Goma Pasta with Uni Sauce
- Scores & Winner:

Chef	Round 1	Round 2	Round 3	Total	Winner
Adhika Maxi	25	49	53	127	Adhika Maxi (2)
Takashie Tomie	25	42	43	110	Adhika Maxi (2)

== Episode 7 ==
- Airdate: 14 May 2017
- Battles: Sezai Zorlu (Iron Chef) vs Hengky Efendy (Challenger Chef)
- Main Ingredient: Oxtail
- Judges:
  - Matteo Guerinoni
  - Ersa Mayori
  - Marcel Chandrawinata
- Served Dishes:
  - Sezai Zorlu:
    (1) Turkish Oxtail Salad
    (2) Turkish Wedding Soup
    (3) Turkish Winter Stew with Vermicelli Rice
  - Hengky Efendy:
    (1) Oxtail Croquette
    (2) Smoke Spicy Oxtail Tortellini and Consommé Broth
    (3) Charcoal Grilled Oxtail, Truffled Mashed Potatoes with Sweet Soya and Chili-Lime Sauce
- Scores & Winner:

Chef	Round 1	Round 2	Round 3	Total	Winner
Sezai Zorlu	25	49	52	126	Sezai Zorlu (3)
Hengky Efendy	21	52	50	123	Sezai Zorlu (3)

== Episode 8 ==
- Airdate: 21 May 2017
- Battles: Adhika Maxi (Iron Chef) vs Putri Mumpuni (Challenger Chef)
- Main Ingredient: Duck Meat
- Judges:
  - Astrid Surya Tenggara
  - Nicky Tirta
  - Tika Panggabean
- Served Dishes:
  - Adhika Maxi:
    (1) Grilled Duck Wrapped in Betel Leaves
    (2) Foie Gras Noodles with Duck Broth Soup and Scorpion Chili Sauce
    (3) Crispy Skin Grilled Duck with Foie Gras Grilled Rice and Duck Fat Sambal
  - Putri Mumpuni:
    (1) Grilled Duck Wrapped in Pohpohan Leaves with Pineapple Pacri and Sambal Lado Mudo
    (2) Duck Wonton in Arsik Style Broth with Poached Daikon, Asparagus and Kecombrang Foam
    (3) Klungkung Smoked Duck with Fried Sambal, Duck Fat-Turmeric Confit and Sauteed Cassava Leaves
- Scores & Winner:

Chef	Round 1	Round 2	Round 3	Total	Winner
Adhika Maxi	25	49.5	47	121.5	Putri Mumpuni
Putri Mumpuni	21.5	55.5	54.5	131.5	Putri Mumpuni

== Episode 9 ==
- Airdate: 4 June 2017
- Battles: Sezai Zorlu (Iron Chef) vs Gloria Susindra (Challenger Chef)
- Main Ingredient: Basa Fish
- Judges:
  - Frans Widjaja
  - Gwen Winarno
  - Irgi Fahrezi
- Served Dishes:
  - Sezai Zorlu:
    (1) Ezmeli Balik (Note: With dried chili sauce)
    (2) Bademli Balik
    (3) Karidesli Balik Baligi
  - Gloria Susindra:
    (1) Sate Lilit with Sambal Matah and Fish Roe
    (2) Basa Fish Tempura with Gulai Dashi
    (3) Spicy Blackened Basa Fish with Onion Soubise, Salsa Succotash and Squid Ink Foam
- Scores & Winner:

Chef	Round 1	Round 2	Round 3	Total	Winner
Sezai Zorlu	27	50	50	127	Sezai Zorlu (4)
Gloria Susindra	20	57	49	126	Sezai Zorlu (4)

== Episode 10 (Revenge) ==
- Airdate: 11 June 2017
- Battles: Adhika Maxi (Iron Chef) vs Putri Mumpuni (Challenger Chef)
- Main Ingredient: Squid
- Judges:
  - Julia Veronica
  - Rianti Cartwright
  - Aing
- Served Dishes:
  - Adhika Maxi:
    (1) Squid Salad with Dabu Dabu Sauce and Fried Calamari sauteed with Kecombrang
    (2) Squid Rawon with Squid Ink Risotto, Emping and Sauteed Squid with Salted Egg
    (3) Squid Velvet Cake
  - Putri Mumpuni:
    (1) Balinese Style Grilled Squid with Pegagan Leaves Salad using Base Genep Oil
    (2) Squid Pepes (using Woku Seasoning) with Kenikir Puree
    (3) Deconstruted Laksa (using Angel Hair Squid Ink Pasta) with Stuffed Braised Squid and Salmon Roe
- Scores & Winner:

Chef	Round 1	Round 2	Round 3	Total	Winner
Adhika Maxi	26.5	55	55.5	137	Adhika Maxi (3)
Putri Mumpuni	21.5	48	42	111.5	Adhika Maxi (3)

== Episode 11 ==
- Airdate: 18 June 2017
- Battles: Chris Salans (Iron Chef) vs Heri Purnama (Challenger Chef)
- Main Ingredient: Rabbit Meat
- Judges:
  - Stefu Santoso
  - Meisya Siregar
  - Ivan Casadevall
- Served Dishes:
  - Chris Salans:
    (1) Seared Rabbit Loin with Sauteed Medjool Dates and Preserved Lemon Puree
    (2) Smoked Rabbit Leg (stuffed with Rabbit Kidney and Rabbit Ribs) with Suna Sekuh Grilled Corn
    (3) Rabbit Murtabak with Apicius Sauce and Acar
  - Heri Purnama:
    (1) Rabbit Woku with Pumpkin Sauce and Ebatan Samosa
    (2) Taliwang Grilled Rabbit
    (3) Saddle of Rabbit (stuffed with Foie Gras, Spinach and Mushroom) with Lemon Grass and Ginger Foam
- Scores & Winner:

Chef	Round 1	Round 2	Round 3	Total	Winner
Chris Salans	25	49	48	122	Chris Salans (3)
Heri Purnama	22	45	44	111	Chris Salans (3)

== Episode 12 ==
- Airdate: 2 July 2017
- Battles: Sezai Zorlu (Iron Chef) vs Patrese Vito (Challenger Chef)
- Main Ingredient: Cheese
- Judges:
  - Alexander Nayoan
  - Wulan Guritno
  - Matteo Guerinoni
- Served Dishes:
  - Sezai Zorlu:
    (1) Kozlemnis Peynirli Biber and Karidesli Peynirli Mantar
    (2) Festigenti Patlican Sarmasi
    (3) Ezmeli Balik (Note: With grilled mozarella and parmesan sauce)
  - Patrese Vito:
    (1) Tomato and Burrata Salad
    (2) Parmesan Risotto with Grilled Rock Lobster, Sauteed Broccoli and Parmesan Foam
    (3) Gorgonzola Crusted Sirloin with Sweet Potato Puree and Sauteed Mushroom
- Scores & Winner:

Chef	Round 1	Round 2	Round 3	Total	Winner
Sezai Zorlu	26	53.5	50	129.5	Sezai Zorlu (5)
Patrese Vito	15	36.5	54.5	106	Sezai Zorlu (5)

== Episode 13 ==
- Airdate: 9 July 2017
- Battles: Chris Salans (Iron Chef) vs Eko Juniarto (Challenger Chef)
- Main Ingredient: Quail Meat
- Judges:
  - Petty Elliott
  - Reino Barack
  - Denada
- Served Dishes:
  - Chris Salans:
    (1) Quail Tataki Carpaccio with Coffee-Cinnamon Dressing
    (2) Smoked and Roasted Quail with Foie Gras and Three Kinds of Nutmeg Fruit (Note: Nutmeg fruit jelly, nutmeg fruit puree and pickled nutmeg fruit)
    (3) Quail Rawon with Sambal Keluwak
  - Eko Juniarto:
    (1) Steamed Quail with Passion Fruit Sauce and Kecombrang Salad
    (2) Smoked and Roasted Quail with Apple-Peach Compote and Truffle Oil
    (3) Diamond Peking-Style Quail with Pomegranate Dressing, Sauteed Mushroom and Pearl Vegetables
- Scores & Winner:

Chef	Round 1	Round 2	Round 3	Total	Winner
Chris Salans	26.5	53.5	52	132	Chris Salans (4)
Eko Juniarto	22.5	42.5	48	113	Chris Salans (4)

== Episode 14 ==
- Airdate: 16 July 2017
- Battles: Sezai Zorlu (Iron Chef) vs Jacob Burrell (Challenger Chef)
- Main Ingredient: Crab
- Judges:
  - Chandra Yudasswara
  - Olla Ramlan
  - Mario Lawalata
- Served Dishes:
  - Sezai Zorlu:
    (1) Yengec Yarik
    (2) Yengecli Pirasa Corbasi
    (3) Yengecli Kabagi Dolmasi
  - Jacob Burrell:
    (1) Crispy Soft Shell Crab with Sliced Coconut mixed with Yoghurt, Sliced Honeydew Melon and Dill
    (2) Sauteed and Smoked King Crab with Grilled Seaweed Rolls (stuffed with Chinese Cabbage), Dijon Mustard-Rice Vinegar Dressing and Oyster Emultion Sauce (Note: Emulsified with ginger, mustard, lime juice and olive oil)
    (3) Broth (Note: Made from crab stock mixed with ginger, red onion, tomato, soybean and lime juice) of Crab (using Dungeness Crab) with Shredded Chicken Thighs and Kulat Pelawan Mushroom
- Scores & Winner:

Chef	Round 1	Round 2	Round 3	Total	Winner
Sezai Zorlu	25	46	47	118	Jacob Burrell
Jacob Burrell	24	54	47	125	Jacob Burrell

== Episode 15 ==
- Airdate: 23 July 2017
- Battles: Chris Salans (Iron Chef) vs Christopher Herlambang (Challenger Chef)
- Main Ingredient: Pumpkin
- Judges:
  - Gwen Winarno
  - Jed Doble
  - Fitri Tropica
- Served Dishes:
  - Chris Salans:
    (1) Pumpkin Gnocchi (Note: Made from mashed pumpkin mixed with instant noodle) with Grated Parmesan Cheese and Pumpkin Sauce
    (2) Grilled Kabocha Pumpkin with Pumpkin Puree, Steamed Turbot Fish and Crumbled Tempe
    (3) Deconstructed Kolak
  - Christopher Herlambang:
    (1) Roasted Scallop with Pumpkin Puree, Roasted Pumpkin, Roasted Aparagus and Avruga Caviar
    (2) Pumpkin Risotto with Black Truffle and Edamame
    (3) Seared Wagyu Sirloin with Roasted Pumpkin, Pickled Pumpkin, Eggplant Puree and Port Reduction Sauce
- Scores & Winner:

Chef	Round 1	Round 2	Round 3	Total	Winner
Chris Salans	24	45.5	55	124.5	Chris Salans (5)
Christopher Herlambang	19.5	38	42.5	100	Chris Salans (5)

== Episode 16 ==
- Airdate: 30 July 2017
- Battles: Sezai Zorlu (Iron Chef) vs Supandi (Challenger Chef)
- Main Ingredient: Lamb
- Judges:
  - Arnold Poernomo
  - Natasha Lucas
  - Christian Sugiono
- Served Dishes:
  - Sezai Zorlu:
    (1) Yarmali Nohutlu Corbasi
    (2) Enginarli Kuzu Pirzola
    (3) Kagit Kebab with Ayran
  - Supandi:
    (1) Seared Marinated Lamb Tataki with Raspberry-Mint Sauce and Lalapan
    (2) Lamb Gulai Rolls (Note: Rolled together with asparagus and carrot) with Cassava Leaves, Mashed Cassava and Sauteed Papaya Flowers
    (3) Rosemary Lamb Cheesecake
- Scores & Winner:

Chef	Round 1	Round 2	Round 3	Total	Winner
Sezai Zorlu	25	43.5	45.5	114	Sezai Zorlu (6)
Supandi	20	42	34	96	Sezai Zorlu (6)

== Episode 17 ==
- Airdate: 6 August 2017
- Battles: Sezai Zorlu (Iron Chef) vs Theodorus Immanuel (Challenger Chef)
- Main Ingredient: Cemani Chicken
- Judges:
  - Wina Bissett
  - Arnold Poernomo
  - Shandy Aulia
- Served Dishes:
  - Sezai Zorlu:
    (1) Tavuk Kulah
    (2) Bademli Tavuk
    (3) Soganli Siyah Tavuk
  - Theodorus Immanuel:
    (1) Cemani Chicken Croquette with Sambal Matah, Pickled Ribbon Cucumber and Carrot and Garlic-Chilli Crumble
    (2) Steamed and Baked Honey Glazed Cemani Chicken with Tamarind Sauce
    (3) Cemani Chicken and Wild Mushroom Dumpling with Kalio Sauce and Sauteed Spinach with Orange Sauce
- Scores & Winner:

Chef	Round 1	Round 2	Round 3	Total	Winner
Sezai Zorlu	20.5	49	48	117.5	Sezai Zorlu (7)
Theodorus Immanuel	23.5	47	44.5	115	Sezai Zorlu (7)

== Episode 18 ==
- Airdate: 13 August 2017
- Battles: Adhika Maxi (Iron Chef) vs Desi Trisnawati (Challenger Chef)
- Main Ingredient: Clam
- Judges:
  - Shanti Serad
  - Vindex Tengker
  - Aline Adita
- Served Dishes:
  - Adhika Maxi:
    (1) Clams Casino (Horse Mussel Yellow Curry Gratin and Horse Mussel-Stuffed Zucchini Gratin) (Note: Seasoned with salt made from dried horse mussel)
    (2) Clams Chowder
    (3) Horse Mussel Noodles (Note: Made from horse mussel meat) with Laksa Broth
  - Desi Trisnawati:
    (1) Misty Clam (Horse Mussel Ceviche with Pohpohan Leaves, Colo-Colo Sambal and Caviar)
    (2) Blue Ocean (Steamed Green Mussel and Scallop with Telang Flower Broth and Kecombrang Foam)
    (3) Atlantis (Grilled Green Mussel Rolls (Note: Rolled together with grilled zucchini ribbons and grilled eggplant ribbons) with Corn Micro Sponge and Deconstructed Sambal Dabu-Dabu and Sambal Korek)
    (4) Extra Dish: Underwater Volcano (Baked Alaska Style Klappertaart with Rum Sauce and Cinnamon Powder) (Note: Not included in the scoring)
- Scores & Winner:

Chef	Round 1	Round 2	Round 3	Total	Winner
Adhika Maxi	28.6	57	58.8	144.4	Adhika Maxi (4)
Desi Trisnawati	29.75	44	50.5	124.25	Adhika Maxi (4)

== Episode 19 ==
- Airdate: 20 August 2017
- Battles: Sezai Zorlu (Iron Chef) vs Edi Pancamala (Challenger Chef)
- Main Ingredient: Octopus
- Judges:
  - Anandita Makes
  - Nicky Tirta
  - Arimbi Nimpuno
- Served Dishes:
  - Sezai Zorlu:
    (1) Greek Style Grilled Octopus with Grilled Baby Carrot, Grilled Watermelon and Grilled Baby Potato
    (2) Saffron and Brown Lentils Soup with Grilled Octopus and Grilled Pumpkin
    (3) Octopus Couscous
  - Edi Pancamala:
    (1) Mediterranean Octopus Salad with Grilled Japanese Eggplant and Pomegranate Sauce
    (2) Grilled Octopus with Squid Ink Congee, Grilled Scallop, Sauteed Green Peas and Red Pepper Emultion Sauce
    (3) Grilled Octopus with Grilled Sea Bass, Eggplant Puree and Brown Butter Sauce
- Scores & Winner:

Chef	Round 1	Round 2	Round 3	Total	Winner
Sezai Zorlu	27.5	53	48.5	129	Sezai Zorlu (8)
Edi Pancamala	21	50.5	44.5	116	Sezai Zorlu (8)

== Episode 20 ==
- Airdate: 27 August 2017
- Battles: Zulkarnain Dahlan (Challenger Chef) vs Chris Salans (Iron Chef)
- Main Ingredient: Egg
- Judges:
  - Yono Purnomo
  - Marissa Nasution
  - Matteo Guerinoni
- Served Dishes:
  - Chris Salans:
    (1) Floating Egg (Soft Boiled Egg with Whipped Cream, Crumbled Tempe and Ossetra Caviar)
    (2) Deconstructed Omelette
    (3) Coconut Milk, Pandan and Mango Puree Spherefication (Note: Made to look like a fried egg) with French Toast
  - Zulkarnain Dahlan:
    (1) Deconstructed Rujak Aceh with Freeze Scrambled Eggs and Kecombrang Foam
    (2) Mie Aceh with Fried Enoki, Kobe Beef Steak and Hollandaise Sauce
    (3) Revisited Fried Banana (Note: Dried coconut crusted fried banana with cream cheese, crumbled tempe, coconut milk sauce and coconut ice cream)
- Scores & Winner:

Chef	Round 1	Round 2	Round 3	Total	Winner
Chris Salans	27	54	55	136	Chris Salans (6)
Zulkarnain Dahlan	11.5	33.5	30.5	75.5	Chris Salans (6)

== Episode 21 ==
- Airdate: 3 September 2017
- Battles: Adhika Maxi (Iron Chef) vs Deni Sugiarto (Challenger Chef)
- Main Ingredient: Coconut
- Judges:
  - Vindex Tengker
  - Aline Adita
  - Alexander Nayoan
- Served Dishes:
  - Adhika Maxi:
    (1) Coconut Chawanmushi with Coconut Gruel, Coconut Meatballs, Coconut Salad, Coconut Cracker and Gulai Broth
    (2) Nasi Uduk with Urap, Serundeng Beef Steak and Coconut Milk-Chili Sambal
    (3) Kopyor Cake with Shredded Coconut and Coconut Jelly
  - Deni Sugiarto:
    (1) Tuna Tartare with Caviar, Lawar and Sambal Matah
    (2) Roasted Lamb Rack with Spicy Herb Serundeng, Botok-Stuffed Nasi Liwet and Gulai Sauce
    (3) Coconut Pudding with Coconut Crumble, Jackfruit Coulis and Palm Sugar Sauce
- Scores & Winner:

Chef	Round 1	Round 2	Round 3	Total	Winner
Adhika Maxi	30	57.5	54	141.5	Adhika Maxi (5)
Deni Sugiarto	26.5	56	55.8	138.3	Adhika Maxi (5)

== Episode 22 ==
- Airdate: 10 September 2017
- Battles: Chris Salans (Iron Chef) vs Nazario Orlando (Challenger Chef)
- Main Ingredient: Caviar
- Judges:
  - Ragil Wibowo
  - Meisya Siregar
  - Reino Barack
- Served Dishes:
  - Chris Salans:
    (1) Escolar Carpaccio with Vanilla Dressing, Andaliman Pepper and Caviar
    (2) Cauliflower Panna Cotta with Oyster Jelly and Caviar
    (3) Salmon Confit with Kaffir Lime-Honey Dressing, Caviar and Kaffir Lime Salad
  - Nazario Orlando:
    (1) Marinated Langoustine with Caviar, Buratta Cream, Quail Boiled Egg and Cafetiere Consommé
    (2) Arborio Risotto with Smoked Salmon, Chopped Asparagus and Caviar (Note: Using ikura and ossetra caviar)
    (3) White Chocolate Mascarpone Mousse with Caviar and Amaretto Crumble
- Scores & Winner:

Chef	Round 1	Round 2	Round 3	Total	Winner
Chris Salans	26.5	50	55	131.5	Draw
Nazario Orlando	26.5	49.5	55.5	131.5	Draw

== Episode 23 ==
- Airdate: 17 September 2017
- Battles: Sezai Zorlu (Iron Chef) vs Dody Jie (Challenger Chef)
- Main Ingredient: Sole Fish
- Judges:
  - Gilles Marx
  - Gracia Indri
  - Dwi Satrio
- Served Dishes:
  - Sezai Zorlu:
    (1) Lemon Grilled Sole Fish with Grilled Potato, Grilled Zucchini and Toasted Pistachio
    (2) Butter Grilled Sole Fish with Grilled Asparagus, Grilled Purple Broccoli, Grilled Tomato and Aparagus-Purple Broccoli Sauce
    (3) Baked Sole Fish in Salt with Steamed Spinach, Grilled Pumpkin, Toasted Pine Nut and Duo Sauce (Note: Spinach-pine nut sauce mixed with pumpkin sauce)
  - Dody Jie:
    (1) Gado-Gado with Sole Fish Sate Lilit
    (2) Butter Grilled Sole Fish with Tomato Rice, Apple Salsa and Lime-Pistachio Sauce
    (3) Fried Sole Fish Cheese Tart with Sliced Strawberry, Raspberry, Mango Sauce, Almond Crumble and Almond Flax
- Scores & Winner:

Chef	Round 1	Round 2	Round 3	Total	Winner
Sezai Zorlu	30.5	40.5	51.0	88.8	Sezai Zorlu (9)
Dody Jie	29.4	30.6	50.0	70.6	Sezai Zorlu (9)

== Episode 24 (Revenge) ==
- Airdate: 24 September 2017
- Battles: Chris Salans (Iron Chef) vs Nazario Orlando (Challenger Chef)
- Main Ingredient: Fruits
- Judges:
  - Haryo Pramoe
  - Vidi Aldiano
  - Bara Pattiradjawane
- Served Dishes:
  - Chris Salans:
    (1) Sauteed Langoustine with Mushroom Carpaccio and Exotic Fruits Dressing and Fruit Salad with Rujak Dressing
    (2) Asinan Bogor ala Chris Salans
    (3) Durian and Chocolate Filo Pastry with Sliced Jackfruit, Tape Ketan Hitam Sauce and Coconut-Pandan Leaves Emulsion
  - Nazario Orlando:
    (1) Crab Salmoriglio with Fruit Salad (Note: Using avocado, apple and melon), Mango Zabaione and Slow Cooked Ricotta (Note: Cooked with cinnamon powder and honey)
    (2) Fruitti Surf and Turf (Wagyu Tenderloin Steak with Grilled Lobster, Grilled Pineapple, Fruit Salad (Note: Using watermelon, papaya and starfruit) and Foie Gras)
    (3) Chocolate Macarons with Banana-Chocolate Cremeux, Cold Meringue, Chopped Jackfruit and Crumble
- Scores & Winner:

Chef	Round 1	Round 2	Round 3	Total	Winner
Chris Salans	24.5	54.5	57.5	136.5	Chris Salans (7)
Nazario Orlando	26	49	54	129	Chris Salans (7)

== Episode 25 ==
- Airdate: 1 October 2017
- Battles: Sezai Zorlu (Iron Chef) vs Francesco Greco (Challenger Chef)
- Main Ingredient: Mushroom
- Judges:
  - Astrid Suryatenggara
  - Dwi Satrio
  - Nadine Chandrawinata
- Served Dishes:
  - Sezai Zorlu:
    (1) Mantarli Ravioli
    (2) Yumurtali Mantar
    (3) Mantarli Nohutlu Kofte
  - Francesco Greco:
    (1) TBA
    (2) TBA
    (3) TBA
- Scores & Winner:

Chef	Round 1	Round 2	Round 3	Total	Winner
Sezai Zorlu	26.5	48.5	49	124	Sezai Zorlu (10)
Francesco Greco	21	43	52.5	116.5	Sezai Zorlu (10)

== Episode 26 ==
- Airdate: 8 October 2017
- Battles: Adhika Maxi (Iron Chef) vs Lucky Andreono (Challenger Chef)
- Main Ingredient: Eel
- Judges:
  - Santhi Serad
  - Primo Rizky
  - Kimberly Rider
- Served Dishes:
  - Adhika Maxi:
    (1) TBA
    (2) TBA
    (3) TBA
  - Lucky Andreono:
    (1) TBA
    (2) TBA
    (3) TBA
- Scores & Winner:

Chef	Round 1	Round 2	Round 3	Total	Winner
Adhika Maxi	27	54	54	135	Adhika Maxi (6)
Lucky Andreono	19.5	49.5	53	122	Adhika Maxi (6)

== Episode 27 ==
- Airdate: 15 October 2017
- Battles: Chris Salans (Iron Chef) vs Budi Lee (Challenger Chef)
- Main Ingredient: Wagyu
- Judges:
  - Rinrin Marinka
  - Ivan Casadevall
  - Ayu Dewi
- Served Dishes:
  - Chris Salans:
    (1) TBA
    (2) TBA
    (3) TBA
  - Budi Lee:
    (1) TBA
    (2) TBA
    (3) TBA
- Scores & Winner:

Chef	Round 1	Round 2	Round 3	Total	Winner
Chris Salans	26.5	46.5	52	125	Chris Salans (8)
Budi Lee	25	43	53	121	Chris Salans (8)

== Episode 28 ==
- Airdate: 22 October 2017
- Battles: Adhika Maxi (Iron Chef) vs Muhammad Fahsihullisan (Challenger Chef)
- Main Ingredient: Tofu
- Judges:
  - Erza ST
  - Widi Mulia
  - Gilles Marx
- Served Dishes:
  - Adhika Maxi:
    (1) TBA
    (2) TBA
    (3) TBA
  - Muhammad Fahsihullisan:
    (1) TBA
    (2) TBA
    (3) Tofu
- Scores & Winner:

Chef	Round 1	Round 2	Round 3	Total	Winner
Adhika Maxi	27.5	53.5	45	126	Adhika Maxi (7)
Muhammad Fahsihullisan	14.5	49	37	100.5	Adhika Maxi (7)

== Episode 29 ==
- Airdate: 12 November 2017
- Battles: Sezai Zorlu (Iron Chef) vs Benny Sarta (Challenger Chef)
- Main Ingredient: Beef brain
- Judges:
  - Ade Putri
  - Gupta Sitorus
  - Ashanty
- Served Dishes:
  - TBA:
    (1) TBA
    (2) TBA
    (3) TBA
  - TBA:
    (1) TBA
    (2) TBA
    (3) TBA
- Scores & Winner:

Chef	Round 1	Round 2	Round 3	Total	Winner
Sezai Zorlu	27	47	50	124	Sezai Zorlu (11)
Benny Sarta	23	39	40	102	Sezai Zorlu (11)

== Episode 30 ==
- Airdate: 19 November 2017
- Battles: Chris Salans (Iron Chef) vs Denny Gunawan (Challenger Chef)
- Main Ingredient: Foie gras
- Judges:
  - Irfan Hakim
  - Petty Elliott
  - Erza ST
- Served Dishes:
  - Chris Salans:
    (1) TBA
    (2) TBA
    (3) TBA
  - Denny Gunawan:
    (1) TBA
    (2) TBA
    (3) TBA
- Scores & Winner:

Chef	Round 1	Round 2	Round 3	Total	Winner
Chris Salans	28	55.5	56.5	140	Denny Gunawan
Denny Gunawan	22.5	59	59.5	141	Denny Gunawan
