= Juna Rorimpandey =

Indonesian cook

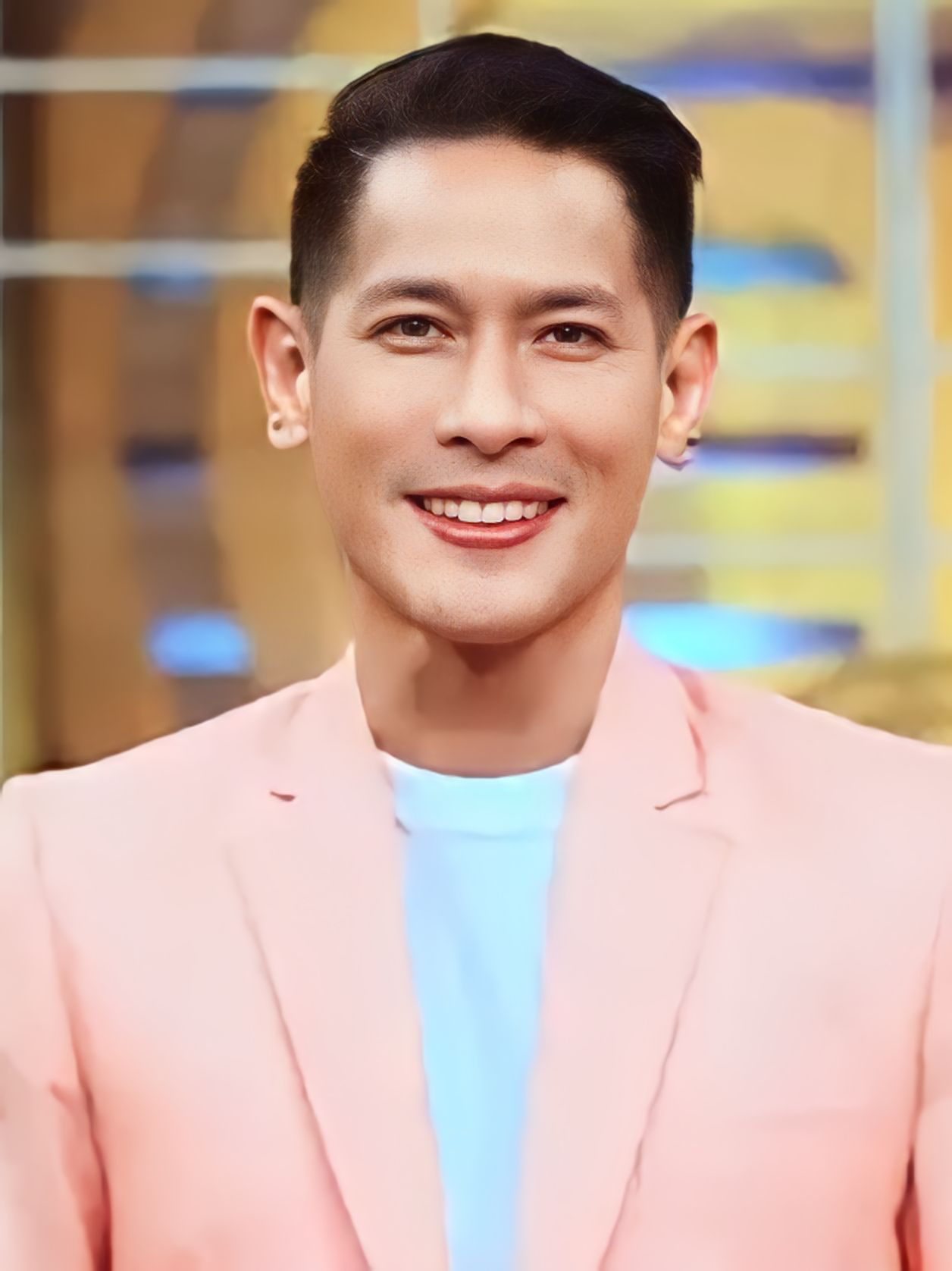
- Juna Rorimpandey in 2022.
- Born: Junior John Rorimpandey; July 20, 1975 (age 50); Jakarta, Indonesia
- Other name: Chef Juna
- Occupation: Chef
- Style: Japanese cuisine French cuisine Indonesian cuisine
- Television: MasterChef Indonesia
- Height: 178 cm (5 ft 10 in)

Junior "Juna" John Rorimpandey (born 20 July 1975) better known as Chef Juna is a professional cook from Indonesia he is widely known for being a judge in the cooking show MasterChef Indonesia. He has resigned from his position of Executive Chef at Jack Rabbit Restaurant, Jakarta at the end of July 2011 and is currently still a judge for MasterChef Indonesia.

For 12 years he went abroad, as a chef specializing in Japanese cuisine and French cuisine and in October 2016, Juna Rorimpandey opened his first restaurant named "Correla" located on the lobby floor of the Rajawali building Kuningan, South Jakarta.

== Early life and career ==
When he was young, Juna Rorimpandey was a delinquent. After graduating from high school, he went on to study in petroleum engineering at Trisakti University for 3.5 years, but didn't finish his studies because of disciplinary issues. He briefly got into drugs and after Failing to graduate from college in Indonesia, Juna moved to Brownsville, Texas, USA in 1997, and sold his motorbike to pay for schooling there. In America, Juna Rorimpandey entered flight school and successfully graduated to get a pilot's license.

While he was studying to get his commercial license, his flight school went bankrupt so he moved to Houston to continue his training. However, due to the 1997 Asian financial crisis, Juna Rorimpandey's parents experienced economic difficulties, forcing Juna Rorimpandey to find his own money for living expenses.

Juna Rorimpandey got into cooking after doing odd jobs to make money, he got a job as a waiter in a traditional Japanese restaurant. After a while, the sushi master at his restaurant offered Juna Rorimpandey to be his student. Juna Rorimpandey accepted the offer and was willing to be trained from scratch. Afterwards the restaurant owner promoted Juna Rorimpandey to get Permanent Residency in the United States.

In 2002, Juna Rorimpandey took over as head chef at the restaurant because the sushi master who trained Juna Rorimpandey moved to another restaurant. Then, in 2003, Juna Rorimpandey moved to another sushi restaurant in Houston called Uptown Sushi and became Executive Chef there.

After getting bored of Japanese cuisine he moved to a French restaurant, The French Laundry which is known as a restaurant that applies high standards. He also had to learn again from scratch. There he was educated very harshly.

After returning home to Indonesia he served as Executive Chef at Jack Rabbit Jakarta restaurant until 2011. He is also active as a judge on MasterChef Indonesia.

== Filmography ==
=== Film ===
Year	Title	Role	Production
2018	13: The Haunted	Chef Papang	RA Pictures
2019	Kembalinya Anak Iblis	Chef Papang	RA Pictures

=== TV Show ===
- MasterChef Indonesia ( Season 1 - 10) (RCTI)
- MasterChef MasterClass Ramadan (RCTI)
- Arjuna (Global TV)
- Hell's Kitchen Indonesia (SCTV)
- MasterChef Asia (Lifetime)
- Chef's Table (NET.)
- Dahsyatnya MasterChef Indonesia (RCTI)
- DCODE: The Progressive Project (NET.)
- OK Chef (RCTI)

=== Commercial ===
Year	Product
2013	Klop (with Chef Aiko)
2013	Nutrijell Pudding Susu
2013	SunCo
2015	Nutrijell Pudding Lapis
2017	Pharmaton
2017	Nutrijell Pudding
2019	Koshihikari
2019	NutriCake
2020	WINCheez
2020	BNSP: Sertifikasi Kompetensi Profesi
