= Rinrin Marinka =

Indonesian chef and restaurateur (born 1980)

- Born: Maria Irena Susanto; March 22, 1980 (age 46); Jakarta, Indonesia
- Other name: Chef Marinka
- Occupations: Celebrity chef, Restaurateur
- Known for: MasterChef Indonesia

Maria Irene Susanto (born 22 March 1980), commonly known as Rinrin Marinka, is an Indonesian chef and restaurateur who was a judge of MasterChef Indonesia and Junior MasterChef Indonesia.

== Education ==
- Elementary & Junior High - Gandhi International School, Jakarta.
- Pelita Harapan High School, Karawaci, Tangerang
- Completed Art & Design KVB Institute College Certificate IV Sydney, Australia (1998 - 1999).
- Attending Visual Communication, Majoring Fashion Design KVB Institute College Sydney, Australia (1999 - 2002).
- Completed Grand Diploma of French Cuisine & Pattiseire Le Cordon Bleu Sydney, Australia (September 2002 - April 2004).

== TV shows ==
- Kuis Rejeki Ramadhan Sasa (Trans 7)
- Selebrita Siang (Trans 7)
- Selamat Pagi (Trans 7)
- Cooking in Paradise (Trans 7)
- Sendok Garpu (Jak TV)
- Sisi kota (TVN)
- Dunia Laki-laki (TVN)
- MasterChef Indonesia (RCTI)
- MasterClass (RCTI)
- JKT48 School Global TV
- Junior MasterChef Indonesia (RCTI)
- Wonderful Indonesia Flavours (Asian Food Channel)
- At Home With Marinka (Asian Food Channel)

== Commercial ==
- La Rasa
- Tepung Bumbu Sasa
