= MasterChef Asia (2026) =

- Season 2
- Judges: Edward Lee; Pichaya Soontornyanakij; Kelvin Cheung
- No. of contestants: 10
- No. of episodes: 10

Release
- Original network: TLC SEA (Southeast Asia); Discovery SEA; Lala TV; Fatafeat Channel; HBO Max

Season chronology
- ← Previous; 2015 Next →

The second season of MasterChef Asia will premiere on September 22, 2026. Edward Lee, Pichaya "Pam" Soontornyanakij, and Kelvin Cheung will be the judges for this season.

On April 30, 2026, Warner Bros. Discovery and CreAsia Studio acquired the rights to produce a revival of MasterChef Asia under an agreement with Banijay Rights. Filming of this series began in May 2026, with the production done entirely in Macao through a partnership with the Macao Government Tourism Office.

== Contestants ==
This season will feature ten contestants who previously competed in other international versions of MasterChef, including the original 2015 season of MasterChef Asia.

Contestants	Age	Country	Series Competed	Previous Ranking(s)	Status	Winnings
Khanh Ong	33	Vietnam	Australia Series 10 & 12	3rd (Series 10); 9th (Series 12)		0
Sahadol Tantrapim (Pond)	34	Thailand	Thailand Season 3 & All-Stars	5th (Season 3); 12th (All-Stars)		0
Sandy Tang	30	China (Macao)	UK Series 16	Runner-Up		0
Areum Yoon	33	South Korea	Korea Season 1	9th	Eliminated 12 November	0
Audrey Wicaksana Tanaja	29	Indonesia	Indonesia Season 7	Runner-Up	Eliminated 12 November	0
Therese Lum	37	China	Australia Series 13	20th	Eliminated 5 November	0
Nambie Marak	38	India	India (Hindi) Season 8	Runner-Up	Eliminated 29 October	0
Ivory Yat Vaksman	40	Philippines	Pinoy Edition Season 1	3rd	Eliminated 29 October	0
Marcus Low	35	Malaysia	Asia (2015)	Runner-Up	Eliminated 15 October	0
Mime Kataniwa	53	Japan	Italia Season 11	8th	Eliminated 2 October	0

== Elimination table ==
Place	Contestant	Episode									
Place	Contestant	1	2	3	4	5	6	7	8	9	10
	Khanh										
	Pond										
	Sandy										
4	Areum										
4	Audrey										
6	Therese										
7	Ivory										
7	Nambie										
9	Marcus										
10	Mime										

(WINNER) This cook won the competition.
(RUNNER-UP) This cook received second place in the competition.
(WIN) The cook won the individual challenge (Mystery Box Challenge or Invention Test) and received an advantage in the next challenge.
(WIN) The cook was on the winning team in the Offsite Challenge and was safe.
(LOW) The cook was on the losing team in the Offsite Challenge and was not safe.
(IN) The cook was not selected as a top entry or bottom entry in a Offsite Team Challenge.
(HIGH) The cook was one of the top entries in the individual challenge, but did not win.
(IN) The cook was not selected as a top entry or bottom entry in the challenge.
(IMM) The cook did not have to compete in that round of the competition and was safe from elimination.
(LOW) The cook was one of the bottom entries in an individual elimination challenge, but was not the last person to advance.
(LOW) The cook was one of the bottom entries in an individual elimination challenge, and was the last person to advance.
(PT) The cook was on the losing team in the Team/Pair Challenge, competed in the Pressure Test, and advanced.
(NPT) The cook was on the losing team in the Team/Pair Challenge, but was exempted from the Pressure Test.
(ELIM) The cook was eliminated from MasterChef.
