= MasterChef Asia =

- Genre: Cooking, Reality television
- Judges: Current; Pichaya Soontornyanakij; Kelvin Cheung; Edward Lee; Former; Audra Morrice; Bruno Ménard; Susur Lee
- Countries of origin: Singapore (season 1); Macau, China (season 2)
- No. of seasons: 2
- No. of episodes: 17

Production
- Running time: 60 minutes; 90 minutes (season premiere); 120 minutes (final)
- Production company: Banijay Entertainment

Original release
- Network: Lifetime (South East Asia)
- Release: 3 September – 10 December 2015
- Network: TLC

MasterChef Asia is a regional competitive cooking reality show based on the original British show MasterChef. The show is produced by Banijay Entertainment and was broadcast on Lifetime Southeast Asia in the 2015 iteration and TLC Southeast Asia starting from the 2026 iteration.

== History ==
=== 2015 iteration ===
A total of 15 home cooks from various regions across Asia (China, India, Indonesia, Malaysia, Philippines, Singapore, Taiwan, Vietnam) competed in the first season of MasterChef Asia. The show formerly was judged by Hong Kong-born, culinary chef Susur Lee; 3-Michelin starred chef Bruno Ménard; and Singapore-born Audra Morrice, a MasterChef Australia finalist. From the MasterChef kitchen to off-site and overseas challenges, the 15 episodes will culminate in one home-cook winning the title of the first ever MasterChef Asia.

=== 2026 iteration ===
On April 30, 2026, Banijay Rights announced the revival of MasterChef Asia as part of an agreement with Warner Bros. Discovery and CreAsia Studio. The new season will feature ten contestants from previous seasons of international versions of MasterChef and include ten 60-minute episodes.

== Judges ==
Season	Judge 1	Judge 2	Judge 3
2015	Audra Morrice	Joe Bastianich	Tiffany Derry
2026	Edward Lee	Pichaya Soontornyanakij	Kelvin Cheung

== Series overview ==
Season	Contestants	Episodes	Originally released		Winner(s)	Runner(s)-up
Season	Contestants	Episodes	First released	Last released	Winner(s)	Runner(s)-up
1	15	15	September 3, 2015	December 10, 2015	Woo Wai Leong	Marcus Low
2	10	10	September 22, 2026	TBA	TBA	TBA
