= Devina Hermawan =

Indonesian chef, author, cooking instructor (born 1993)

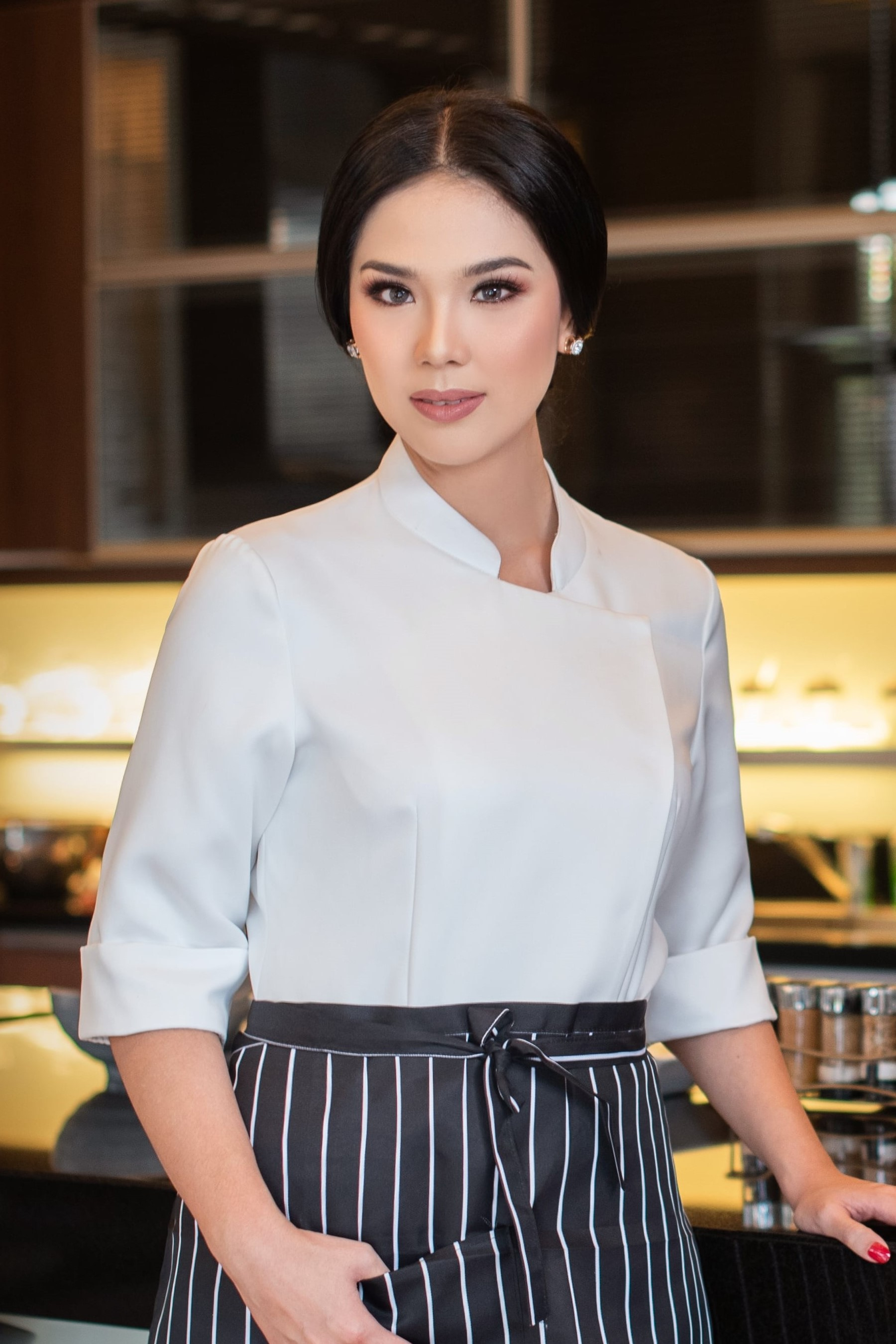
- Devina Hermawan
- Born: November 11, 1993 (age 32); Bandung, West Java, Indonesia
- Other name: Chef Devina
- Education: Bandung Institute of Technology
- Occupations: Chef, author, cooking instructor
- Notable work: Indonesian Fusion Foods Yummy! 76 Menu Favorit Anak
- Style: Indonesian; Japanese; Western; Fusion
- Television: Dapur Devina; Indonesian Flavour; Masak Ala Devina Hermawan
- Height: 170 cm (5 ft 7 in)
- Spouse: Anthony Tjandra (m. 2016)
- Children: Andrew Orham; Audie Orla; Austine Orlene
- Awards: 10 Wanita Panutan 2017; 14 Wanita Inspiratif 2022; Pemimpin Inovatif 2025; Indonesia Creative Awards 2025
- Website: devinahermawan.com

Devina Hermawan (born 11 November 1993) is an Indonesian chef, author, and cooking instructor.

== Education ==
- Elementary School Santo Yusup I Bandung, Indonesia (2000–2006).
- Junior High School Santo Aloysius Bandung, Indonesia (2006–2009).
- Senior High School Santo Aloysius Bandung, Indonesia (2009–2012).
- Bachelor of Business Management at Bandung Institute of Technology, Indonesia (2012–2016).

== Early life ==
Devina's interest in the culinary world began during her time in high school. She frequently practiced her cooking passion, using various cookbooks and YouTube channels, to cater events both at home and at school.

After high school, Devina pursued a degree in Business Management at the Bandung Institute of Technology (ITB), Indonesia. Alongside her studies, Devina also accepted requests for private dining services. She has served several national figures, including the former President of Indonesia, Susilo Bambang Yudhoyono, and the former Governor of West Java, Ridwan Kamil.

Another activity Devina pursued was modelling. Devina has also worked as a fashion model for several national designers.

She married Anthony Tjandra in 2016. The couple has three children.

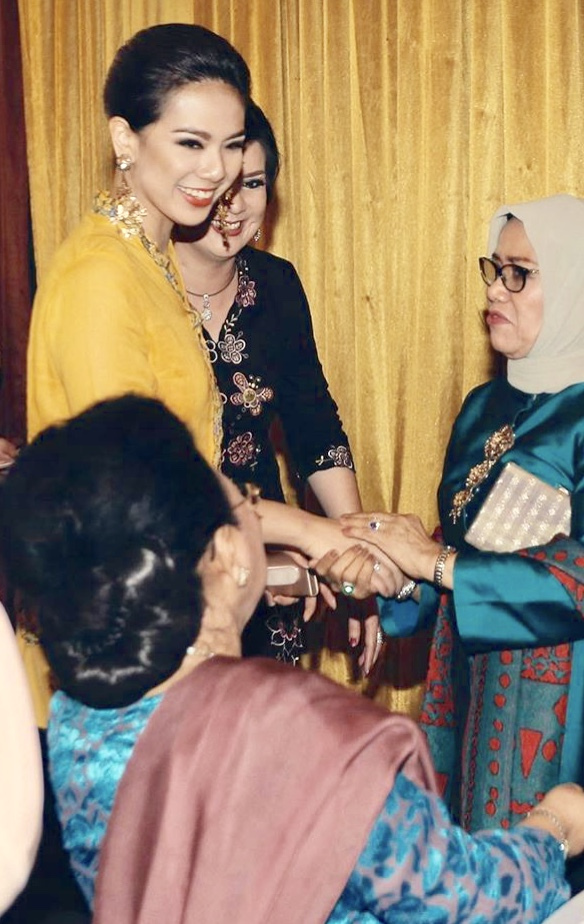
Devina Hermawan with Mufidah Jusuf Kalla in Opening Show by Ghea Panggabean, Mutu Manikam Nusantara

== Career ==
Devina gained widespread recognition after she participated in the television program MasterChef Indonesia (season five). Following her appearance on MasterChef, she became active in sharing recipes and cooking tutorials across various digital platforms, including YouTube and Cookpad. Her content is distinguished by its characteristic "tips & tricks" and "anti-fail" methods. As of September 2025, she has produced over 1,500 recipe videos and accumulated 8 million followers across all platforms.

In September 2025, Devina formally received the Executive Chef competency certificate from the National Professional Certification Agency (BNSP). The certificate was symbolically presented by the Chairman of the BNSP, Syamsi Hari, at the BNSP Building in Jakarta.

=== Cookbook ===
Devina Hermawan has authored two cookbooks: Indonesian Fusion Foods (2019) and Yummy! 76 Menu Favorit Anak (2021). The book Indonesian Fusion Foods has been notably successful, having been reprinted sixteen times, while Yummy! 76 Menu Favorit Anak (English: Yummy! 76 Favorite Children's Menus) has been reprinted nine times. Both titles were published by Kawan Pustaka, a publisher within the Agromedia Group, as of December 1, 2021.

In addition to her publishing activities, Devina is also known for developing Lamama TV, a media business focused on current health information and culinary trends. This venture is primarily operated through the Instagram social media account, @lamama.tv

=== Brand ambassador and TV commercial ===
Since 2021, Devina has been appointed as a brand ambassador for several major international and national companies. She became the brand ambassador for Tefal in Indonesia in 2021, representing the French manufacturer of cookware. In the same year, she served as the brand ambassador for the American food conglomerate, Quaker Oats, and the New Zealand dairy brand, Anchor, both for the Indonesian market.

In 2022, Devina was selected as the brand ambassador for Winn Gas, a national Indonesian company specializing in kitchen equipment and gas appliance manufacturing. Furthermore, Devina regularly appears as a brand ambassador in television advertisements for various other products, including Mie Sedaap Ala Chef Devina (from Wings Group), Cedea Seafood, XL Axiata, BOLA Deli flour (FKS Food), and numerous other brands.

=== Television show ===
Devina has hosted several cooking shows that air on Indonesian television. The program Dapur Devina (Devina's Kitchen) began airing on TVRI on March 12, 2022, featuring recipes from various regions across Indonesia. Following this, Indonesian Flavour premiered on TVRI World on April 8, 2023, covering Indonesian regional recipes but presented entirely in English. Most recently, Masak Ala Devina Hermawan (Cooking Devina Hermawan Style) started its broadcast on BTV on September 9, 2024, focusing on Chef Devina's signature recipes in the Indonesian language.

=== Special collaboration menu ===
Devina frequently collaborates with various national and multinational brands and restaurants. These collaborations have included companies such as Cinépolis Indonesia, Shihlin Indonesia, Ta-Wan, Yummy Choice (Indomaret, Tbk), Golden Lamian, and Kitchenette (Ismaya Group), among several others. Her collaborative products have been marketed nationally across Indonesia.

== Books ==
- Indonesian Fusion Foods (2019), ISBN 978-979-082-317-4
- Yummy! 76 Menu Favorit Anak (2021), ISBN 978-979-757-685-1
- 100+ Menu Populer Ala Resto (2026), ISBN 978-602-068-736-0

== Brand Ambassadors ==
- Cedea Seafood (2025–present)
- Mie Sedaap (2024–present)
- Filma Minyak Goreng (2024–present)
- Maggi Indonesia (2024–present)
- Krim Kafe (2024–present)
- Tefal (2021–present)
- Quaker (2021–2024)
- Anchor (2021–2024)
- BOLA Deli (2021–2023)
- XL Axiata (2023)
- GrabMart Indonesia (2023)
- Winn Gas (2022–2024)

== Filmography ==
- Dapur Devina (2022–present, re-run)
- Indonesian Flavour (2023–present, re-run)
- Masak Ala Devina Hermawan (2024–present, re-run)

== Notes and references ==
=== References ===
- "Nasi Ayam Oncom ala Chef Devina Sukses Bikin Emil Ketagihan" (in Indonesian). Bandung: WJToday.com. 26 March 2019. Archived from the original on 26 March 2019.
- "Ayam Oncom Chef Devina Diminta Jadi Menu Maksi Ridwan Kamil" (in Indonesian). Bandung: Inilah.com. 26 March 2019.
- "Emil Ketagihan Nasi Ayam Oncom ala Finalis Master Chef Devina" (in Indonesian). Bandung: Koran Sindo. 26 March 2019.
- "Devina Hermawan: Iga Bakar Saus Cappuccino, Cara Unik Nikmati Kopi" (in Indonesian). Bandung: Liputan 6. 28 April 2017.
- "Devina Hermawan, Berjuang untuk Sejahterakan Petani Kopi di Indonesia" (in Indonesian). Jakarta: Kabare.id. 6 April 2017.
- "Devina Hermawan: Kuliner Unik Iga Bakar Saus Cappuccino" (in Indonesian). Bandung: BisnisWisata.co.id. 28 April 2017. Archived from the original on 1 May 2017.
- "Ridwan Kamil Minta Ayam Oncom Jadi Salah Satu Menu Makan Siang Rutin" (in Indonesian). Bandung: Kompas. 25 March 2019.
- "Saat Chef Devina Sajikan Ayam Oncom ala Devina untuk Kang Emil, Rasanya Gurih, Kompleks dan Unik" (in Indonesian). Bandung: TribunNews.com. 25 March 2019.
- "Devina Hermawan: Memadukan Hobi dan Bisnis" (in Indonesian). Bandung: Pikiran Rakyat. 20 December 2015.
- "Devina Hermawan: Antara Dapur Catwalk, Alam dan Anak-anak" (in Indonesian). Bandung: Pikiran Rakyat. 31 March 2013.
- "Devina Hermawan: Kembangkan Energi Multitalenta" (in Indonesian). Bandung: Koran Sindo. 9 December 2012.
