= MasterChef Asia (2015) =

- Season 1
- Judges: Audra Morrice; Joe Bastianich; Tiffany Derry
- No. of contestants: 16
- Winner: Woo Wai Leong
- Runner-up: Marcus Low
- No. of episodes: 15

Release
- Original network: Lifetime SEA
- Original release: September 3 – December 10, 2015

Season chronology
- ← Previous Next → 2026

The first season of MasterChef Asia premiered on Lifetime SEA on September 3, 2015. Audra Morrice, Joe Bastianich, and Tiffany Derry were the judges for this season.

== Guest chefs ==
- Chef Eric Teo, Chef Patron/Owner of ET Culinary Arts (1 October 2015)
- Dato' Dr. Fazley Yaakob, Winner of MasterChef Celebrity Malaysia and Chef Patron/Owner of SukaSucre Bistro in Cheras, Malaysia (8 October 2015)
- Chef Janice Wong, Chef Patron/Owner of 2am:dessertbar and 2am:lab in Singapore (5 November 2015)
- Chef Gaggan Anand, Chef Patron/Owner of Gaggan in Bangkok, Thailand (10 December 2015, Season Finale)
- Chef Juna Rorimpandey, Celebrity Chef, and MasterChef Indonesia judge on season 1 and 2 (10 December 2015, Season Finale)
- Chef Justin Quek, Chef Patron/Owner of Sky On 57 in Singapore (10 December 2015, Season Finale)
- Chef Bjorn Shen, Author, Chef Patron/Owner of Artichoke in Singapore (10 December 2015, Season Finale)
- Chef David Pynt, Chef of Burnt Ends in Singapore (10 December 2015, Season Finale)
- Chef May Chow, Chef Patron/Owner of Little Bao in Hongkong (10 December 2015, Season Finale)
- Chef Asaph D, Youngest Michelin Chef Star, Youngest Culinary World Champion. Executive Chef Le Cordon Bleu Kuala Lumpur, Paris & London, Guest Judge MasterChef USA, Guest Judge MasterChef Canada, Guest Judge MasterChef Australia, Guest Judge MasterChef Junior, (10 December 2015 Guest Judge)

== Contestants ==
Contestants	Age	Country	Occupations	Status	Winnings
Woo Wai Leong	27	Singapore	Lawyer	Winner 10 December	5
Marcus Low	24	Malaysia	Banker	Runner-Up 10 December	7
Jasbir Kaur	54	Malaysia	Homemaker	Eliminated 3 December	4
Priya Barve	39	India	Marketing Manager	Eliminated 26 November	5
Đoàn Phương Hà	31	Vietnam	Entrepreneur	Eliminated 19 November	5
Lennard Yeong	27	Singapore	Engineer	Eliminated 12 November	5
Blanche Chu Yin	28	Taiwan	Model	Eliminated 5 November	2
Sandrian Tan	41	Singapore	Homemaker	Eliminated 29 October	2
Lica Ibarra	29	Philippines	Finance Sales Officer	Eliminated 22 October	1
Vonny Lestari	20	Indonesia	Student	Eliminated 8 October	0
Rico Amancio	31	Philippines	Paralegal	Eliminated 1 October	1
Alice Peng	32	China	Scientist	Eliminated 24 September	0
Stefan Pratama	25	Indonesia	Sales Representative	Eliminated 17 September	0
Jake Aycardo	24	Philippines	Analyst	Eliminated 10 September	0
Sophia Zulkifli	30	Malaysia	Homemaker	Eliminated 3 September	0

== Elimination table ==
Place	Contestant	Episode																
Place	Contestant	1	2	3		4	5	6	7	8	9	10	11	12		13	14	15
1	Leong	IN	WIN	HIGH	IN	IN	IN	WIN	IN	LOW	HIGH	WIN	LOW	IN	LOW	IN	WIN	WINNER
2	Marcus	IN	WIN	WIN	WIN	IN	IN	WIN	IN	WIN	IN	HIGH	WIN	LOW	IN	WIN	IN	RUNNER-UP
3	Jasbir	HIGH	WIN	IN	HIGH	IN	IN	WIN	LOW	WIN	HIGH	IN	WIN	LOW	HIGH	IN	ELIM	
4	Priya	IN	WIN	HIGH	IN	WIN	LOW	WIN	LOW	IN	IN	IN	WIN	HIGH	WIN	ELIM		
5	Ha	HIGH	WIN	IN	IN	LOW	HIGH	WIN	WIN	IN	WIN	LOW	LOW	WIN	ELIM			
6	Lennard	WIN	WIN	IN	LOW	WIN	HIGH	WIN	HIGH	WIN	LOW	LOW	ELIM					
7	Blanche	IN	LOW	IN	IN	WIN	WIN	PT	LOW	LOW	LOW	ELIM						
8	Sandrian	IN	WIN	IN	IN	IN	IN	WIN	IN	IN	ELIM							
9	Lica	IN	LOW	IN	HIGH	LOW	LOW	WIN	HIGH	ELIM								
10	Vonny	IN	LOW	IN	IN	LOW	IN	ELIM										
11	Rico	LOW	LOW	IN	LOW	WIN	ELIM											
12	Alice	IN	LOW	IN	IN	ELIM												
13	Stefan	IN	LOW	IN	ELIM													
14	Jake	LOW	ELIM															
15	Sophia	ELIM																

(WINNER) This cook won the competition.
(RUNNER-UP) This cook received second place in the competition.
(WIN) The cook won the individual challenge (Mystery Box Challenge or Invention Test) and received an advantage in the next challenge.
(WIN) The cook was on the winning team in the Offsite Challenge and was safe.
(LOW) The cook was on the losing team in the Offsite Challenge and was not safe.
(IN) The cook was not selected as a top entry or bottom entry in a Offsite Team Challenge.
(HIGH) The cook was one of the top entries in the individual challenge, but did not win.
(IN) The cook was not selected as a top entry or bottom entry in the challenge.
(IMM) The cook did not have to compete in that round of the competition and was safe from elimination.
(LOW) The cook was one of the bottom entries in an individual elimination challenge, but was not the last person to advance.
(LOW) The cook was one of the bottom entries in an individual elimination challenge, and was the last person to advance.
(PT) The cook was on the losing team in the Team/Pair Challenge, competed in the Pressure Test, and advanced.
(NPT) The cook was on the losing team in the Team/Pair Challenge, but was exempted from the Pressure Test.
(ELIM) The cook was eliminated from MasterChef.

== Episodes ==
No.	Title	Original release date	Asian viewers (millions)
1	"Show Us Who You Are"	3 September 2015	2.14
MasterChef Asia begins with the arrival of 15 of the best home cooks in the region who will begin a 15-week journey full of drama and excitement under the guidance of our three world class judges. The contestants’ first challenge involved cooking a dish to tell the judges who they are.
2	"Food on the Fly"	10 September 2015	N/A
In the first offsite challenge the remaining 14 contestants are divided in two teams to serve five different types of canapés to 80 VIP guests on Asia’s largest observation platform - the Singapore Flyer.
3	"Quintessentially MasterChef"	17 September 2015	N/A
13 remaining contestants are tasked with two challenges - Mystery Box and the Invention Test. In the mystery box challenge, nine ingredients were on offer and the contestants must make a sweet or savory dish featuring at least one of the ingredients. For the Invention Test, Marcus who won the Mystery Box challenge gained an advantage of choosing the core ingredients for everyone to cook with (ginger, garlic or chilies). The challenge was to cook their version of Asian soup in 30 minutes.
4	"Taking It To The Street"	24 September 2015	N/A
The remaining 12 contestants were divided into three teams of four and man their own stall at Singapore’s famous Lau Pa Sat (Telok Ayer Market) hawker centre. Each team was tasked to prepare one of the three main ethnic cuisines of Singapore – Malay, Indian and Chinese. As a winner of the Invention Test in Week 3, Marcus gained the advantage of choosing which cuisine he wants to cook, and have chosen Indian cuisine where he also became the team captain. Green team consist of Blanche (Captain), Lennard, Priya and Rico. Red team consist of Vonny (Captain), Jasbir, Ha and Alice. Although the Blue team received the most positive comments from the judges, the Green team took the victory with over 170 votes, Blue team with 131 votes and Red team with 119 votes. Alice was eliminated due to her mistake of choosing Sirloin over Chuck for the 5 Spice Beef dish which the team decided not to serve because it was too dry.
5	"Claws Are Out"	1 October 2015	N/A
In this episode of Masterchef Asia the remaining 11 contestants must re-invent a classic Singaporean dish – Chili Crab. At the beginning of the show, guest chef Eric Teo demonstrated how to cook a classic Chili Crab and the contestants were given 90 minutes to reinvent the dish. By taking inspiration of the dish and combining it with one of her favorite dish, Blanche won the challenge with her Chili Crab version of Guo Bao. Rico was eliminated as he failed to capture the essence of Singaporean Chili Crab which is the sauce.
6	"One Stewed Pair"	8 October 2015	N/A
Five teams fight over 5 cuisines and 5 home appliances, resulting in a bizarre combination and creative cooking. You’ve never seen the flavors of USA, Thailand, Spain, France and Italy like this before!; The pairs are: Leong and Lica, Lennard and Marcus, Blanche and Vonny, Jasbir and Sandrian, Priya and Ha. Blanche and Vonny is the lowest team of the five, and they face to face with each other in the elimination challenge where they have to cook their best dish in 30 minutes, using the remaining ingredients in all the 5 fridges at their disposal. In the end, Vonny cook the least impressive dish due to her short crust pastry dish is mainly too sweet and out of balance and was sent home.
7	"For the Greater Good"	15 October 2015	N/A
It was a mass cooking madness in the MasterChef kitchen where the contestants had to cook for 150 guests for a fundraising in conjunction with the World's Food Day.
8	"Lost in Transit"	22 October 2015	N/A
Contestants compete for customers at Singapore Changi Airport, not just with each other, but also with the airport's numerous eateries. Those who survive the challenge are in for a big surprise.

== International broadcasts ==
The programme is being broadcast in the Philippines by TV5 every Sunday night at 8pm, starting 8 November 2015. In Indonesia, every Saturday at 3pm on Global TV. Malaysia, Every Monday at 6:30pm on Astro Ria. In India every Saturday at 10:00pm on Star World Premiere. In Singapore, on Channel 5, starting at 10.30 p.m, every Sunday.
