= Matteo Guerinoni =

Italian-Indonesian restaurant owner and former motorcycle racer

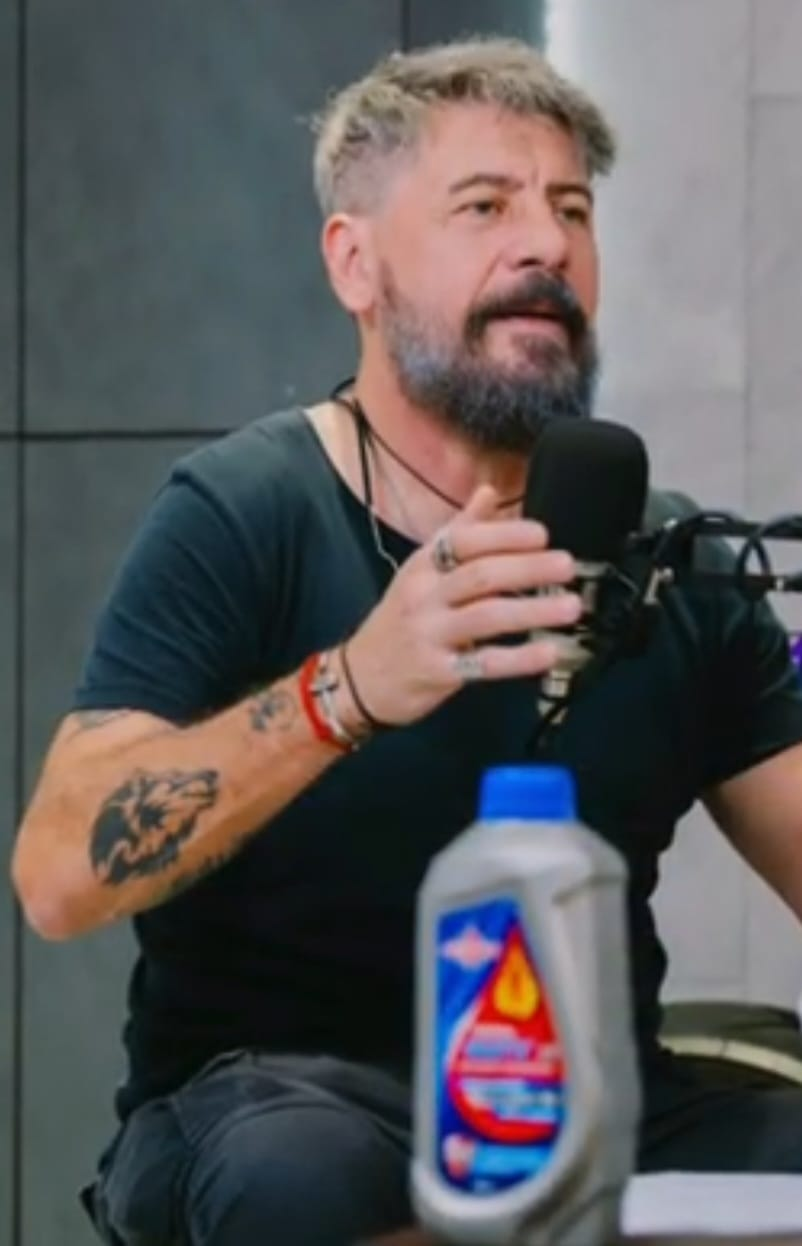
- Born: 11 April 1968 (age 58); Bergamo, Italy
- Other name: Chef Matteo
- Occupations: Businessman; Restaurateur; Motorcycle racer Commentator
- Years active: 1986-present
- Spouse: Teges Prita Soraya (divorced)
- Children: Rosa Guerinoni; Azzurra Guerinoni

Matteo Guerinoni is an Italian-Indonesian former racer and restaurant owner. In 2015, he became a judge on MasterChef Indonesia on RCTI. He was formerly a commentator on MotoGP on Trans7 and Fox Sports Asia.
