= Dapur Devina =

National cooking show from Indonesia

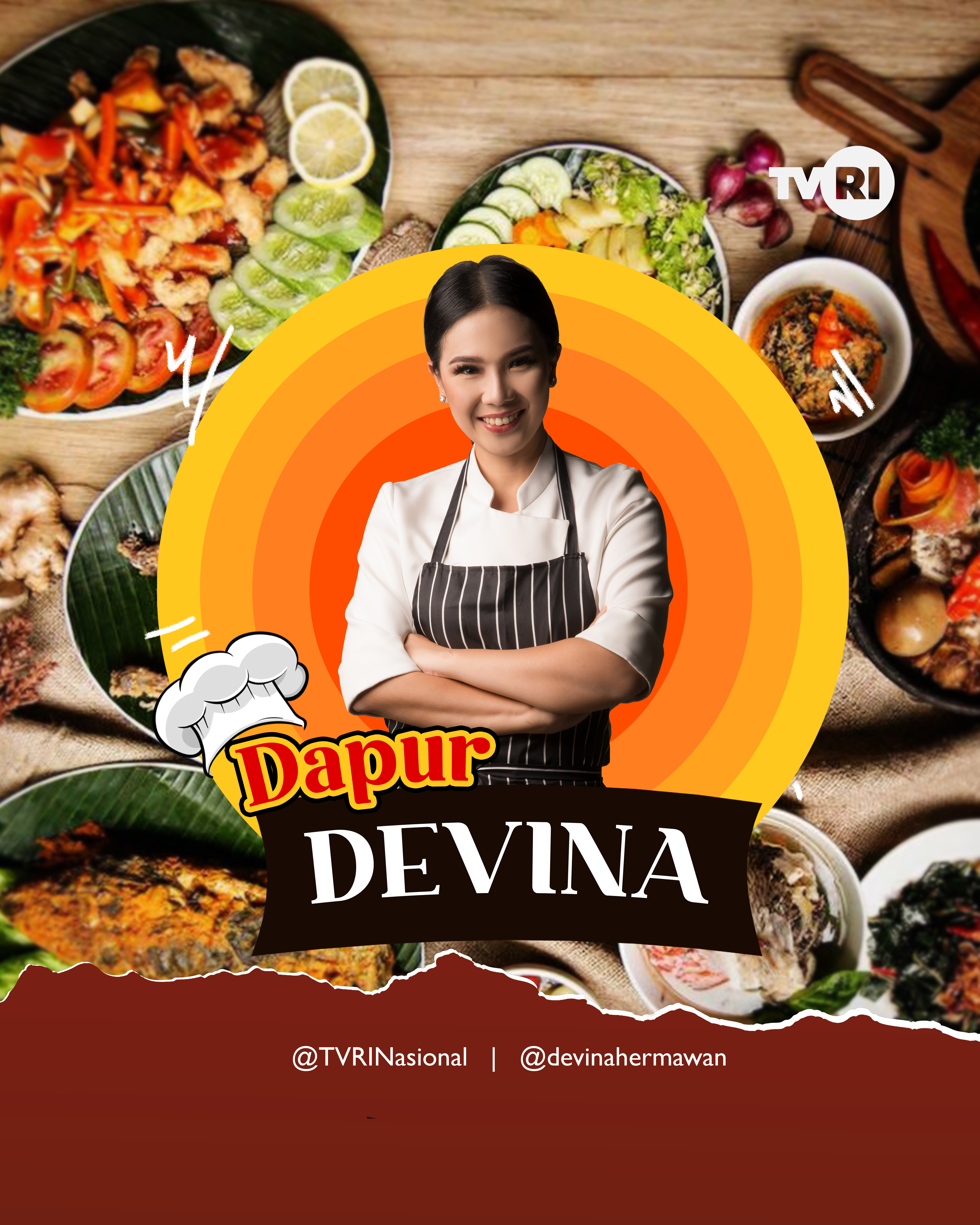
- Poster of Dapur Devina
- Also known as: Devi’s Pantry (devispantry)
- Genre: Cooking show Educational; Edutainment
- Presented by: Devina Hermawan
- Country of origin: Indonesia
- Original language: Indonesian
- No. of seasons: 2
- No. of episodes: 30

Production
- Production locations: Bandung, Indonesia
- Camera setup: Multiple
- Running time: 24-28 minutes
- Production company: TVRI

Original release
- Network: TVRI
- Release: March 12, 2022 – present

Related
- Indonesian's Flavour With Chef Devina

Dapur Devina is a cooking show presented by an Indonesian chef, writer, and cooking instructor, Devina Hermawan, more closely known as Chef Devina.

The first episode of Dapur Devina was aired on March 12, 2022, and will be subsequently broadcast every Saturday at 10.30 WIB on TVRI. Dapur Devina will present various menus and recipes from different regions in Indonesia. Dapur Devina is Chef Devina’s first cooking program on television. Presently, Chef Devina has completed the shoot for 30 episodes for season 1 & 2.

== Host ==
- Devina Hermawan

== Episodes ==
=== Season 1 ===
Episode	Date	Types of regional cuisines
1	March 12, 2022	Ayam woku, bakwan jagung (perkedel milu)
2	March 19, 2022	Siomay Bandung ayam, es tape singkong
3	March 26, 2022	Nasi liwet Solo rice cooker: nasigurih, ayam ungkep, lodeh labu siam, areh
4	April 2, 2022	Sate maranggi (sate manis), es timun serut
5	April 8, 2022	Lempah ikan (khas Bangka), tumis kangkung belacan
6	April 9, 2022	Nasi kebuli ayam, es buah santan
7	April 15, 2022	Nasi goreng Jawa, kolak campur
8	April 16, 2022	Ayam bekakak bakar madu, bubur sumsum
9	April 22, 2022	Ayam goreng kremes, oseng lokio
10	April 23, 2022	Bakmi ayam cincang, pangsit goreng saus asam manis
11	April 29, 2022	Tahu gimbal, es teh serai
12	April 30, 2022	Rawon, wedang asle
13	May 6, 2022	Krengsengan tahu telur, sempol ayam
14	May 7, 2022	Soto Betawi, pisang goreng renyah
15	May 27, 2022	Oseng cumi hitam, tempe goreng kucai
16	May 28, 2022	Sup merah khas Surabaya, udang goreng tepung

=== Season 2 ===
Episode	Date	Types of regional cuisines
17	June 3, 2022	Ikan pesmol, colenak
18	June 4, 2022	Pecel Madiun, tahu tempe bacem
19	June 10, 2022	Sate taichan, gulai udang daun singkong
20	June 11, 2022	Asam udeung (sambal udang belimbing wuluh), martabak Aceh
21	June 17, 2022	Sate Padang, puding lumut
22	June 18, 2022	Ayam betutu, plecing kangkung
23	June 24, 2022	Ayam bakar Taliwang, beberuk
24	June 25, 2022	Coto Makassar, pisang epe
25	July 1, 2022	Ikan bakar dabu-dabu, sayur rica rodo
26	July 2, 2022	Soto tauco, tahu aci
27	July 8, 2022	Kari bihun Medan, rujak serut
28	July 9, 2022	Ayam suwir bumbu Bali, telur dadar sambal matah
29	July 15, 2022	Selat soto daging cincang, es kapal
30	August 5, 2022	Nasi goreng cikur / kencur, heci (bakwan sayur + udang)
