= MasterChef Indonesia =

Indonesian reality show

- Genre: Talent show Cookery; Reality show
- Created by: Franc Roddam
- Judges: Juna Rorimpandey; Rinrin Marinka; Vindex Tengker; Degan Septoadji; Arnold Poernomo; Matteo Guerinoni; Renatta Moeloek; Rudy Choirudin; Norman Ismail; Karen Carlotta
- Country of origin: Indonesia
- Original language: Indonesian
- No. of seasons: 13
- No. of episodes: 264

Production
- Executive producers: Ubey Sain (2011); Adam Sugriwo (2013); Jahja Immanuel Riyanto (2015); Syilvia Pradhika (2019); Bramantyo N. Wikastopo (2019)
- Producers: Adam Sugriwo (2011–2012); Otty Indra (2011–2013); Bramantyo N. Wikastopo (2015); Eri Sumaryadi (2019); Tisondo Karel (2020-2025)
- Camera setup: Multiple-camera
- Running time: 120–270 minutes
- Production companies: FremantleMedia (2011–13); Shine Group (2011–15); Endemol Shine Group (2019–21); Banijay Entertainment (2021–)

Original release
- Network: RCTI
- Release: 1 May 2011 – 15 March 2026

MasterChef Indonesia (abbreviated as MCI) is an Indonesian competitive cooking reality show based on the original British series of the same name, open to amateur and home chefs. Produced by Endemol Shine Group, it debuted on 1 May 2011 on RCTI and has thirteen seasons to date.

== Format ==
MasterChef Indonesia airs two days a week from Saturday to Sunday. The competition takes place in the RCTI's studio in Kebon Jeruk, West Jakarta which is known as MasterChef Gallery and includes a large kitchen area with several cooking stations which is overlooked by a balcony, a well-stocked pantry, and a freezer.

At the audition round, the contestants have to prepare their mainstay dish for around 30 minutes. The judges can advance them to the next round based on their dishes by deciding to give them an apron or not.

In the bootcamp round, the first challenge is to have the contestants perform basic skills such as filleting a fish, peeling shrimp, etc. During that time, the judges will observe their techniques. The second challenge requires the contestants to create a dish using a prepared staple ingredient. The judges can advance them to the gallery round or eliminate them, taking their aprons, based on their cooking techniques and the taste of their dishes.

Subsequently, the formal competition typically begins following a three event cycle that takes place over two episodes, where the judges will eliminate one or even two contestants after the third event. The events typically are:

- Mystery Box: Contestants are all given a box with the same ingredients and must use only those ingredients to create a dish within a fixed amount of time. The judges will select 3 dishes based on visual appearance and technique alone to taste, and from these 3 select one winner who will gain an advantage to prevent the pressure test and advance to the next round automatically.
- Elimination Test: The judges explain to the mystery box winner the theme of the elimination test (or sometimes take the winner to the pantry) and tell of at least one advantage. The typical example of this is selecting the specific ingredient to use or dish to recreate, but can also include automatic advancement to the next round, assigning certain ingredients to specific chefs or saving one of the contestants. The rest of the contestants are then informed and collected any ingredients that has been prepared for this test with a fixed amount of time to complete the dish. Judges evaluate all dishes based on taste and visual appeal. One from the contestants with a best dish will go straight to the next round and then the judges will nominate some of the contestants with a worst dish and critique their dishes before telling them to get ready for the pressure test.
- Pressure Test: The worst performing contestants must compete against each other to make a standard dish within a very limited amount of time that requires a great degree of cooking finesse. For those contestants who pass to the next round will watch the test from the balcony. Each dish is judged on the taste, visual appeal and technique, and the losing contestant is eliminated.
- Signature Dish: Contestants are tasked with creating a dish that represented themselves and their cooking philosophy around a staple ingredient or theme.
- Duplication Test: Contestants are required to duplicate a certain dish in terms of presentation and taste.
- Skills Test: The judges explain the preparation of a specific dish, or the preparation of an ingredient. The contestant is then required to reproduce that dish in a specific time limit – typically 15–20 minutes. The judges then look the contestant's attempt and give feedback. The judges give a 1-minute penalty to a contestant who cannot prepare the ingredient or cook the dish properly before continuing the next step.
- Offsite Challenge: Challenges that must be done outside the MasterChef gallery.

== Seasons overview ==
Season	Premiere Date	Finale Date	Time	Winner	Runner-up	No. of Finalists	Judges		
Season	Premiere Date	Finale Date	Time	Winner	Runner-up	No. of Finalists	1	2	3
1	1 May 2011	21 August 2011	4:30 pm	Lucky Andreono †	Agus Gazali Rahman	20	Juna Rorimpandey	Rinrin Marinka	Vindex Tengker
2	8 July 2012	28 October 2012	5:30 pm	Desi Trisnawati	Taufik Hidayat	20	Degan Septoadji	Rinrin Marinka	Juna Rorimpandey
3	5 May 2013	17 August 2013	4:15 pm	William Gozali	Febrian Wicaksono	25	Degan Septoadji	Rinrin Marinka	Arnold Poernomo
4	31 May 2015	12 September 2015	4:30 pm	Luvita Hodiono	Deny Gumilang	30	Matteo Guerinoni	Arnold Poernomo	—N/a
5	3 March 2019	16 June 2019	4:00 pm (Note: Starting in 19 April 2019, the broadcast time was changed from the previous 3:30 pm to 4:00 pm.)	Stefani Horison	Kaisha Fridayassie	26	Juna Rorimpandey	Renatta Moeloek	Arnold Poernomo
6	21 December 2019	8 March 2020	4:30 pm	Eric Herjanto	Firhan Ashari	28	Juna Rorimpandey	Renatta Moeloek	Arnold Poernomo
7	26 September 2020	27 December 2020	4:30 pm	Jerry Andrean	Audrey Wicaksana Tanaja	20	Juna Rorimpandey	Renatta Moeloek	Arnold Poernomo
8	29 May 2021	29 August 2021	4:30 pm	Jesselyn Lauwreen	Nadya Puteri	18	Juna Rorimpandey	Renatta Moeloek	Arnold Poernomo
9	22 January 2022	24 April 2022	5:00 pm	Cheryl Puteri Gunawan	Palitho Aventus Simanjuntak	22	Juna Rorimpandey	Renatta Moeloek	Arnold Poernomo
10	24 December 2022	26 March 2023	5:00 pm	Giovanni Vergio	Fahmi Prachaya Ruangroj	24	Juna Rorimpandey	Renatta Moeloek	Arnold Poernomo
11	26 August 2023	26 November 2023	4:30 pm	Belinda Christina Sianto	Rizkisyah Putra Singarimbun	24	Juna Rorimpandey	Renatta Moeloek	Arnold Poernomo
12	8 February 2025	17 May 2025	3:00 pm (Note: During the holy month of Ramadan, the broadcast time was changed from the previous 3:45 pm to 2:00 pm (including 13 April 2025). On 5-6 and 12 April 2025, the broadcast time was changed from the previous 2:00 pm to 2:30 pm. Starting 19 April 2025, the broadcast time was changed from the previous 2:30 pm to 3:00 pm.)	Fajar Gusti Pangestu	Putu Hovit Yusmanjia	25	Juna Rorimpandey	Renatta Moeloek	Rudy Choirudin
13	13 December 2025	15 March 2026	6:00 pm (Note: On 17-18 January 2026, the broadcast time was changed from 4:00 pm to 4:30 pm. Starting 24 January 2026, the broadcast time was changed from 4:30 pm to 5:00 pm.)	Stephanie Meyerson	Monica Bunga Tania Wibowo	26	Juna Rorimpandey	Karen Carlotta	Norman Ismail

== Winners and Runner-ups' statistics ==
=== Winners ===
Season	Contestants	Age (Note: Ages stated are at start of contest.)	Origin	Occupation	Win amount		Number of Pressure Tests	
Season	Contestants	Age	Origin	Occupation	Individual	Team	Yes	No
1	Lucky Andreono †	31	Malang	Furniture Entrepreneur	10	4	6	0
2	Desi Trisnawati	39	Bangka	Hotel Director	11	6	2	0
3	William Gozali	22	Jakarta	Store Supervisor	5	5	3	0
4	Luvita Hodiono	20	Jakarta	College Student	7	3	1	0
5	Stefani Horison	22	Sampit	Online Food Entrepreneur	1	3	6	1
6	Eric Herjanto	33	Jakarta	Scientist	5	1	3	0
7	Jerry Andrean	24	Banten	Entrepreneur	3	1	5	0
8	Jesselyn Lauwreen	21	Medan	Fresh Graduate	3	2	6	0
9	Cheryl Puteri Gunawan	24	Surabaya	Content Creator	2	0	3	0
10	Giovanni Vergio	28	Jakarta	Expedition Marketing	6	0	4	1
11	Belinda Christina Sianto	22	Malang	Student	2	3	7	0
12	Fajar Gusti Pangestu	25	Tabanan	Entrepreneur	11	2	1	1
13	Stephanie Meyerson	30	Pontianak	Permanent Make-Up Artist	1	4	6	1

=== Runner-ups ===
Season	Contestants	Age	Origin	Occupation	Win amount		Number of Pressure Tests	
Season	Contestants	Age	Origin	Occupation	Individual	Team	Yes	No
1	Agus Gazali Rahman	25	Banjarmasin	Teacher	5	4	4	0
2	Taufik Hidayat	30	Surabaya	Property Agent	8		8	0
3	Febrian Wicaksono	25	Solo	Private Employee	4	2	7	0
4	Deny Gumilang	35	Jakarta	Entrepreneur	5	0	5	0
5	Kaisha Fridayassie	30	Bogor	Entrepreneur	2	2	7	0
6	Firhan Ashari	22	Cilegon	College Student	4	2	4	0
7	Audrey Wicaksana Tanaja	23	Surabaya	Cook Helper	1	3	5	0
8	Nadya Puteri	25	Jakarta	Bread Seller	4	0	7	0
9	Palitho Aventus Simanjuntak	29	Malang	Cafe Owner	1	2	8	0
10	Fahmi Prachaya Ruangroj	22	Bogor	Fresh Graduate	4	1	4	1
11	Rizkisyah Putra Singarimbun	22	Medan	Restaurant Employee	5	3	4	0
12	Putu Hovit Yusmanjia	33	Gianyar	Restaurant Owner	7	0	3	1
13	Monica Bunga Tania Wibowo	28	Malang	Cafe Owner	4	2	5	1

== Black Teams' best result statistics ==
Best Result		Season	Contestants (Note: if in the season more than one contestant, the best result is going to be in list)	Age (Note: Ages stated are at start of contest.)	Origin	Occupation
Winner		7	Jerry Andrean	24	Serang	Entrepreneur
Runner-Up		2	Taufik Hidayat	30	Surabaya	Property Agent
TOP	3	3	Marissa Navratilova	26	Jakarta	Stay-at-home Mom
TOP	3	4	Yulia Baltschun	24	Pangandaran	College Student
TOP	3	5	Shierleen Sulivan	20	Bandung	College Student
TOP	3	10	Bernardinus Mario Oswin Gitta	19	Yogyakarta	Fresh Graduate
TOP	3	11	Nick Nierxen	24	Batam	Property Agent
TOP	4	8	Febi Astrina Asyagaf	33	Jambi	Marketer
TOP	5	12	Wiji Indah Arianti	40	Kediri	Food stall owner
TOP	6	1	Feronika Ang	25	Toli-Toli	Interior Designer
TOP	6	6	Christo Tjahjanto	24	Medan	Model
TOP	6	9	Raden Indra Lesmana	37	Cibinong	Freelancer
TOP	6	13	Ragil Viatna	25	Surabaya	Restaurant Owner

== Seasons synopsis ==
=== Season 1 (2011) ===
This inaugural season premiered on 1 May 2011. The judges for this season were Juna Rorimpandey, Rinrin Marinka, and Vindex Tengker. There were 20 finalists competing for the title.

On 8 May 2011, Dudi withdrew from the competition due to his deteriorating health condition.

The first Indonesian MasterChef winner was Lucky Andreono, a 31-year-old furniture entrepreneur, with Agus Sasirangan, a 25-year-old teacher, being the runner-up.

==== Top 20 ====
Rank	Contestant	Age (Note: Ages stated are at start of contest.)	Origin	Occupation	Status	Ref
1	Lucky Andreono†	31	Malang	Furniture Entrepreneur	Winner 21 August
2	Agus Gazali Rahman	25	Banjarmasin	Teacher	Runner-up 21 August
3	Santiana Hermono	27	Yogyakarta	Computer Sales	Eliminated 14 August
4	Rahmi Melati Johan	22	Padang	College Student	Eliminated 7 August
5	Priscilya "Priscil" Princessa	22	Bandung	Model	Eliminated 24 July
6	Feronika "Fero"Ang	25	Toli-Toli	Interior Designer	Eliminated 5 June; Returned 11 June; Second Elimination 10 July
7	Albie Martha Hidayat	36	Bandung	Store Manager	Eliminated 3 July
8	Gunawan "Sarwan" Hakim	41	Surabaya	Office Boy	Eliminated 26 June
9	Duhita "Tata" Cynthia Arsani	28	Jakarta	Cafe Owner	Eliminated 19 June
10	Kevindra "Kevin" Prianto Soemantri	18	Jakarta	Student	Eliminated 12 June
11	Hendry Ho	31	Bandar Lampung	Private Teacher	Eliminated 11 June; Second Elimination 2 July
Non Elimination (4 June)
12	Sasha Ali Halvorsen	37	Jakarta	Engineer	Eliminated 29 May
13	Teguh Adi Prabowo	38	Surabaya	Craftsman	Eliminated 29 May; Second Elimination 9 July
14	Hilman Elhaki	38	Bandung	Snack Entrepreneur	Eliminated 28 May
Non Elimination (22 May)
15	Farah Inggrid	38	Jakarta	Wedding Organiser	Eliminated 21 May
16	Niken Menik	58	Jakarta	Company Consultant	Eliminated 15 May
17	Marcella Bustami	29	Bogor	Accessories Entrepreneur	Eliminated 14 May; Second Elimination 18 June
18	Aditya "Adit" Tirto Usodo	26	Jakarta	Parkour Athlete	Eliminated 8 May; Second Elimination 25 June
19	Abud Dudi†	59	Surabaya	Director	Withdrew 8 May
20	Allen	33	Surabaya	Contractor	Eliminated 7 May

=== Season 2 (2012) ===
The second season premiered on 21 August 2012. This season, Juna Rorimpandey and Rinrin Marinka returned as judges, while Vindex Tengker was replaced by Degan Septoadji.

There were 20 original finalists competing this season. Adeline withdrew from the competition on 29 July 2012 to be with her children.

The winner was Desi Trisnawati, a 39-year-old hotel director from Bangka. Taufik Hidayat, a 30-year-old property agent, was the runner-up.

==== Top 20 ====
Rank	Contestant	Age	Origin	Occupation	Status	Ref
1	Desi Trisnawati	39	Bangka	Hotel Director	Winner 28 October
2	Taufik "Opik" Hidayat	30	Surabaya	Property Agent	Eliminated 26 August; Returned 15 September; Runner-Up 28 October
3	Ken Kurniawan Sutanto	30	Surabaya	Restaurant Manager	Eliminated 14 October
Non Elimination (7 October)
4	Vera Christiani	23	Bandung	Graphic Designer	Black Team 8 September; Returned 22 September; Eliminated 6 October
5	Baguzt Noverman	30	Surabaya	Tattoo Artist	Eliminated 25 August; Returned 8 September; Second Elimination 30 September
6	Joice Pesulima†	60	Jakarta	Stay-at-Home Mom	Eliminated 23 September
7	Nurul K. Aswan	25	Jakarta	Stay-at-Home Mum	Black Team 22 September; Eliminated 29 September
8	Beng Budiarso	32	Jakarta	Cake Decorator	Eliminated 16 September
9	Zartika "Zeze" Zahra	20	Jakarta	College Student	Black Team 15 September; Eliminated 29 September
10	Amalia "Hani" Hendrajatin	23	Bandung	Dancer	Eliminated 9 September
11	Lutfi Karismanto	23	Jakarta	Freelancer	Eliminated 2 September
12	Widya Pratiwi	22	Jakarta	Restaurant Staff	Eliminated 19 August
13	Dianita "Dian" Tiastuti	25	Jakarta	Film Publisher	Eliminated 18 August; Second Elimination 1 September
14	Agus Mamake†	28	Kroya	Fruit Seller	Eliminated 12 August; Second Elimination 29 September
15	Faisal Esach Rifky	21	Sidoarjo	College Student	Eliminated 11 August; Second Elimination 29 September
Non Elimination (5 August)
16	Yudi Baskoro	21	Jakarta	Hotel Security	Eliminated 4 August
17	Adeline "Adel"	37	Bandung	Civil Servant	Withdrew 29 July
18	Kevin Lim	18	Bandung	College Student	Eliminated 28 July
19	Ogan Muhsin	36	Jakarta	Fitness Centre General Manager	Eliminated 22 July
20	Nuuril Fahmia	25	Bandung	Flight Attendant	Eliminated 21 July

=== Season 3 (2013) ===
The third season premiered on 5 May 2013. This season, judges Rinrin Marinka and Degan Septoadji returned from the previous season with a new addition to the judge, Arnold Poernomo, replacing Juna Rorimpandey. The number of finalists was 25 contestants, up from the previous 20 contestants.

The winner of this season was William Gozali, a 22-year-old store supervisor, with Febrian Wicaksono, a 25-year-old private employee, as the runner-up.

==== Top 25 ====
Rank	Contestant	Age	Origin	Occupation	Status	Ref
1	William Gozali	22	Jakarta	Store Supervisor	Winner 17 August
2	Febrian Wicaksono "Brian"	25	Solo	Private Employee	Runner-up 17 August
3	Marissa Navratilova "Rissa"	26	Jakarta	Stay-at-home Mom	Eliminated 22 June; Returned 30 June; Black Team 6 July; Returned 13 July; Second Elimination 10 August
4	Melitta Kumalasari	24	Jakarta	Private Employee	Eliminated 8 June; Returned 6 July; Second Elimination 4 August
5	Nino Andre	28	Surabaya	IT Employee	Black Team 30 June; Returned 7 July; Eliminated 3 August
6	Dentia "Denty" Mayasari	28	Denpasar	Homestay Owner	Eliminated 16 June; Returned 30 June; Second Elimination 28 July
7	Lius Antoni	22	Jakarta	Private Employee	Eliminated 25 May; Returned 29 June; Second Elimination 27 July
8	Agung Putu Setyawati "Tya"	21	Denpasar	College Student	Eliminated 21 July
9	Angella Limmunandar	38	Manado	Stay-at-home Mum	Eliminated 20 July
10	Blasius Yogi Hantara	45	Yogyakarta	Dancer	Eliminated 14 July
11-13	Evengeline Mimi Morysa	26	Jakarta	Entrepreneur	Black Team 29 June; Returned 30 June; Black Team 7 July; Eliminated 13 July
11-13	Lim Kevin Gunawan	26	Bandung	Entrepreneur	Black Team 30 June; Returned 6 July; Eliminated 13 July
11-13	Ilham Gilang Ramadhan	24	Situbondo	Private Teacher	Black Team 6 July; Eliminated 13 July
Non Elimination (6–7 July)
14	Nurul Annisa Octavia	20	Bandung	College Student	Black Team 30 June; Eliminated 30 June
15	Patty Maulana	28	Palembang	Civil Servant	Eliminated 1 June; Second Elimination 29 June
16	Maichel Surya Wijaya	27	Jakarta	Private Teacher	Eliminated 22 June
17	Dominicus Revaldi	23	Surabaya	Business Consultant	Eliminated 16 June
18	Giovanni "Gio" Kurniawan	20	Jakarta	College Student	Eliminated 15 June
19	Ratna Duwi	23	Jakarta	Customer Relation Executive	Eliminated 9 June
19	Soraya "Ray" Nakagawa	53	Yogyakarta	Stay-at-home Mom	Eliminated 2 June
20	Rani Kirana	30	Yogyakarta	Stay-at-home Mom	Eliminated 2 June
21	Lilian Danil	29	Bandung	Lecturer	Eliminated 1 June
23	Melati Yusmarelda	26	Yogyakarta	Interior Designer	Eliminated 26 May
24	Setiyono	37	Wonosobo	Merchant	Eliminated 25 May
25	Ernest H.O. Lontoh	33	Bogor	Restaurant Manager	Eliminated 19 May

=== Season 4 (2015) ===
The fourth season premiered on 31 May 2015. The number of finalists was 30 contestants, up from the previous 25 contestants. There were only two judges this season. Arnold Poernomo returned, with new judge Matteo Guerinoni joining him, replacing both Rinrin Marinka and Degan Septoadji.

On 25 July 2015, Budi A. M. withdrew from the competition due to a long-term stomach problem that caused him to be unable to finish his cooking in the elimination test.

The winner of this season was Luvita Hodiono, a 20-year-old college student, making her the youngest winner in the history of MasterChef Indonesia. She defeated Deny Gumilang, a 35-year-old entrepreneur.

==== Top 30 ====
Rank	Contestant	Age	Origin	Occupation	Status	Ref
1	Luvita Hodiono	20	Jakarta	College Student	Winner 12 September
2	Deny Gumilang	35	Jakarta	Entrepreneur	Runner-Up 12 September
3	Yulia Baltschun	24	Pangandaran	College Student	Eliminated 18 July; Black Team 8 August; Returned 9 August; Second Elimination 6 September
4	Shella Jane Lokito	22	Surabaya	Entrepreneur	Eliminated 5 September
5	Axhiang Leeyan	35	Bangka Belitung	Restaurateur	Eliminated 30 August
6-7	Laras Andini	27	Malang	Stay-at-Home Mom	Eliminated 29 August
6-7	Risky Aprilian	24	Surabaya	Veterinarian	Eliminated 29 August
8	Antonius Henri A.D.	38	Bogor	Fitness Coach	Eliminated 23 August
9	Beatrix Sunarso	34	Jakarta	Private Employee	Eliminated 22 August
Non Elimination (16 August)
10	Anwar Sanjaya	23	Jakarta	College Student	Black Team 8 August; Returned 9 August; Eliminated 15 August
11	Terennia "Tere" Risley	19	Surabaya	College Student	Black Team 9 August; Eliminated 9 August
12	Valda Rompas	25	Sukabumi	Entertainer	Eliminated 1 August; Black Team 8 August; Second Elimination 9 August
13	Febrian "Bachien" Rachman	27	Jakarta	Consultant Marketing	Eliminated 26 July; Black Team 8 August; Second Elimination 9 August
14	Raymond Phang	24	Jakarta	IT Marketing	Eliminated 28 June; Black Team 8 August; Second Elimination 9 August
Non Elimination (2 August)
15	Budi A.M.†	40	Jakarta	Restaurant Manager	Withdrew 25 July
16	Nuning Putri	46	Jakarta	Stay-at-Home Mom	Eliminated 19 July
17	Acep Mohamad	29	Bandung	Musician	Eliminated 18 July
18	Andi Mifta	25	Makassar	Private Employee	Eliminated 12 July
19	Samuel Gan	43	Mataram	Headmaster	Eliminated 11 July
20	Andre Soeprapto	36	Jakarta	Presenter	Eliminated 5 July
21	Rubby J. Cherub	31	Jakarta	Host	Eliminated 4 July
22	Arya Wiwaha	29	Bandung	Entrepreneur	Eliminated 27 June
Non Elimination (21 June)
23-24	Margaretha "Emma" E. Padink	24	Surabaya	Private Employee	Eliminated 20 June
23-24	Riyardi "Ardi" Limas	22	Jakarta	Entrepreneur	Eliminated 20 June
25	Amalia "Amel" Hapsari	23	Sidoarjo	Private Employee	Eliminated 14 June
26	Adri M.C.	36	Bandung	Tour Guide	Eliminated 13 June
26	Dwy Linda Subandi	23	Jakarta	IT Staff	Eliminated 13 June
28-29	Zakki Purnama	25	Bandung	Entrepreneur	Eliminated 7 June
28-29	Adji Mas Bratasena	18	Wonogiri	College Student	Eliminated 7 June
30	Gratia Eirene	24	Jakarta	Public Relations	Eliminated 6 June

=== Season 5 (2019) ===
After a four-year hiatus, MasterChef Indonesia confirmed on 27 September 2018, in its official Instagram, that the series had been renewed for the fifth season. This season premiered on 3 March 2019 with Juna Rorimpandey and Arnold Poernomo returning as judges, and a new addition to the judge Renatta Moeloek replacing Matteo Guerinoni. The number of finalists decreased from the previous 30 to 26 contestants.

Fani Horison from Sampit was announced as the winner, with Kai Firdayassie as the runner-up.

==== Top 26 ====
Rank	Contestant	Age	Origin	Occupation	Status	Ref
1	Stefani "Fani" Horison	22	Sampit	Online Food Entrepreneur	Winner 16 June
2	Kaisha "Kai" Fridayassie	30	Bogor	Entrepreneur	Runner-Up 16 June
3	Shierleen "Elin" Sulivan	20	Bandung	College Student	Eliminated 6 April; Black Team 21 April; Returned 27 April; Second Elimination 2 June
Non Elimination (25 May)
4	Yulita "Lita" Intan Sari	29	Banjarmasin	Stay-at-Home Mom	Eliminated 19 May
Non Elimination (12 May)
5	Bukhori R. H.	26	Manokwari	Online Food Entrepreneur	Eliminated 11 May
6	Daniar Widyana	27	Banyuwangi	Entertainer	Eliminated 28 April
7-11	Devina "Devi" Hermawan	25	Bandung	Stay-at-Home Mom	Eliminated 27 April
7-11	Fiki Dwi Cahyono	25	Surabaya	Restaurant Worker	Eliminated 27 April
7-11	Theophilus Hans	22	Jakarta	College Student	Eliminated 27 April
7-11	Kevin Christian	26	Jakarta	Freelancer	Eliminated 6 April; Black Team 21 April; Returned 27 April; Second Elimination 27 April
7-11	Maria Irene	24	Jakarta	Freelancer	Eliminated 7 April; Black Team 21 April; Returned 27 April; Second Elimination 27 April
12	Fickri Rahmawan	23	Bandung	Entrepreneur	Eliminated 20 April; Black Team 21 April; Second Elimination 27 April
13	Kadek Dwi Tjahyadi	35	Denpasar	Pharmacist Assistant	Eliminated 20 April; Black Team 21 April; Second Elimination 27 April
14	Bayu Wratsongko	28	Yogyakarta	Chicken Seller	Eliminated 14 April; Black Team 21 April; Second Elimination 27 April
15	Sany Nuzul	22	Bandung	College Student	Eliminated 13 April; Black Team 21 April; Second Elimination 27 April
16	Syafril "Rama" Ramadhan	31	Jakarta	Fried Rice Stall Owner	Eliminated 7 April; Black Team 21 April; Second Elimination 27 April
17-19	Sarah Eka Aprilia	26	Jakarta	Stay-at-Home Mum	Eliminated 31 March
17-19	Rizky Maulana	25	Yogyakarta	Lecturer	Eliminated 31 March
17-19	Christina Ribka	22	Surabaya	College Student	Eliminated 31 March
Non Elimination (30 March)
20-21	Andy Hartono	28	Jakarta	Restaurant Owner	Eliminated 24 March
20-21	Dave Christiano	21	Sidoarjo	Fresh Graduate	Eliminated 24 March
22-23	Brian Ardianto †	27	Malang	Food Stylist	Eliminated 23 March
22-23	Yonathan "Joey" Melvin	28	Jakarta	Kitchen Planner	Eliminated 23 March
24	Erham Tanjung	56	Jakarta	Chemical Company CEO	Eliminated 17 March
25-26	Hariall "Riall" Arief	24	Pontianak	Private Employee	Eliminated 16 March
25-26	Heru "Heiru" Dwi Putro	28	Purwokerto	Bar Manager	Eliminated 16 March

=== Season 6 (2019–20) ===
The sixth season premiered on 21 December 2019 with Juna Rorimpandey, Arnold Poernomo, and Renatta Moeloek returning as judges. The number of finalists increased to 28 contestants from the previous 26 contestants.

On 11 January 2020, Eddy Siswanto was disqualified from the competition because he was found cheating by carrying a recipe note while making a dessert in a Safe and Risk challenge.

On 25 January 2020, Arthur Tamnge withdrew from the competition because he had to tend to his pregnant wife although he had passed the pressure test.

At the end of the season, Eric Herjanto was declared the winner, with Firhan Ashari as the runner-up.

==== Top 28 ====
Rank	Contestant	Age	Origin	Occupation	Status	Ref
1	Eric Herjanto	33	Jakarta	Scientist	Winner 8 March
2	Firhan Ashari	22	Cilegon	College Student	Runner-Up 8 March
3	Ade Kurniawan Saputra	24	Bandung	Textile Entrepreneur	Eliminated 8 March
Non Elimination (7 March)
4	Fransisca	26	Jakarta	Model	Eliminated 1 March
Non Elimination (29 February)
5	Vanty Veronica	41	Sukabumi	Stay-at-Home Mom	Eliminated 23 February
6	Christo Tjahjanto	24	Medan	Model	Eliminated 19 January; Black Team 26 January; Returned 26 January; Second Elimination 22 February
7-8	Fajar Alam Setiabudi	37	Jakarta	Biker	Eliminated 16 February
7-8	Christina Amelia Chuatan	30	Singkawang	Receptionst	Eliminated 16 February
9	Putu Wahyu Saputra	21	Bali	Steward	Eliminated 15 February
10	Oetami "Amy Zein" Ramayani	42	Jakarta	Radio Announcer	Eliminated 9 February
11-12	Imelda Tahir	31	Jakarta	Entertainer	Eliminated 8 February
11-12	Soni Syam	26	Bandung	Textile entrepreneur	Eliminated 8 February
13-14	Lydia "Fifin" Finna	28	Banjarnegara	Stay-at-Home Mom	Eliminated 2 February
13-14	Lidya Permata	26	Bandung	Gamer	Eliminated 2 February
15-16	Gina Aditya	27	Bogor	Model	Eliminated 1 February
15-16	Surya Firdaus	32	Aceh	Rujak Seller	Eliminated 1 February
17	Nurhayati Sintia Massa	27	Gorontalo	Stay-at-Home Mom	Eliminated 25 January; Black Team 26 January; Second Elimination 26 January
18	Arthur Tamnge	27	Bandung	Research & Deveploment Staff	Withdrew 25 January
19	E.F. Julian Diaz	21	Maumere	Entrepreneur	Eliminated 19 January; Black Team 26 January; Returned 26 January; Second Elimination 1 February
20	Jordhi Aldyan	22	Bandung	College Student	Eliminated 19 January; Black Team 26 January; Second Elimination 26 January
Non Elimination (18 January)
21-22	Aji Leddy	58	Samarinda	Stay-at-Home Mom	Eliminated 12 January; Black Team 26 January; Second Elimination 26 January
21-22	Trendy Wijaya	27	Tegal	Bird Trainer	Eliminated 12 January; Black Team 26 January; Second Elimination 26 January
23	Ira Nadya Octavira	30	Sukabumi	Headmaster	Eliminated 11 January
24	Eddy Siswanto	49	Bangka	YouTuber	Disqualified 11 January
25-26	Ari Fauzi Azhari†	25	Bandung	Wedding Planner	Eliminated 5 January
25-26	Rania Karima	20	Depok	College Student	Eliminated 5 January
27	Amira Wardiyanila Fatin	23	Purbalingga	Online Entrepreneur	Eliminated 4 January
28	Ilham Satrio Mahardiko	24	Pekanbaru	Agriculture Entrepreneur	Eliminated 29 December

=== Season 7 (2020) ===
The seventh season premiered on 26 September 2020 with all three previous judges returning. The number of contestants decreased from 28 to 20.

Since this season was filmed during the COVID-19 pandemic, practice of social distancing, wearing a cooking mask and gloves while handling ingredients were required. For the first time in history, a mother and son (Yuli and Hamdzah) competed together in the gallery.

The winner was 24-year-old entrepreneur Jerry Andrean, who was eliminated on 31 October and returned on 7 November, making him the first former Black Team member to win the competition. The runner-up was 23-year-old cook helper, Audrey Wicaksono. Wicaksono would later return to compete in the TLC Asia version of MasterChef Asia.

==== Top 20 ====
Rank	Contestant	Age	Origin	Occupation	Status
1	Jerry Andrean	24	Serang	Entrepreneur	Winner 27 December; Returned 7 November; Black Team 1 November; Eliminated 31 October
2	Audrey Wicaksana Tanaja	23	Surabaya	Cook Helper	Runner-up 27 December
3	Nindy Novitasari Sanyoto	24	Lombok	Online Entrepreneur	Third Place 20 December
Non-Elimination (13 December)
4	Faiz Naufal Habibie	24	Bangka	Online Entrepreneur	Eliminated 6 December
Non-Elimination (5 December)
5	Clavania "Clava" Kho	20	Jakarta	Student	Eliminated 29 November
Non-Elimination (28 November)
6	Adit Gurnawijaya	27	Sukabumi	Musician	Eliminated 22 November
7	Rebecca "Becca" Natalia Suwignyo	23	Banjarmasin	Preschool Teacher	Eliminated 21 November
8	Hamdzah Herrynaldi Timories	29	Tangerang	Tour Guide; Yuli's Son	Eliminated 15 November
9-10	Malik Abdul Aziz Amri Akbar	26	Jakarta	Artist	Eliminated 24 October; Black Team 1 November; Returned 7 November; Second Elimination 14 November
9-10	Mariska Tracy	34	Belitung	Stay-at-home Mom	Eliminated 14 November
11	Muhamad Umair Dava †	21	Bandung	Hairstylist	Eliminated 8 November
12	Risma Yulana	48	Jakarta	Dance Teacher	Eliminated 8 November
13	Zahra "Yuri" Yuriva Dermawan	21	Bandung	Entertainer	Eliminated 7 November
14	Ramos Nenggo	33	Manado	Head of Marketing	Eliminated 31 October; Black Team 1 November; Second Elimination 7 November
15	Siti "Yuli" Yuliana	51	Tangerang	Stay-at-home Mom; Hamdzah's Mom	Eliminated 25 October
16-17	Isman Fajar	26	Kudus	Grilled Chicken Seller	Eliminated 18 October; Black Team 1 November; Second Elimination 1 November
16-17	Faradiba Chika Jusuf	22	Bogor	Clothes Seller	Eliminated 18 October
18	Victor "Vicky" Sumanti	35	Manado	Model	Eliminated 17 October; Black Team 1 November; Second Elimination 7 November
Non-Elimination (11 October)
19	Hanzel Christheo	19	Jakarta	Student	Eliminated 10 October; Black Team 1 November; Second Elimination 7 November
20	Dini Dinda	27	Tangerang	Sate Taichan Seller	Eliminated 4 October

=== Season 8 (2021) ===
The first episode of the 8th season aired on 29 May 2021. All three previous judges returned in this season. The number of contestants decreased from 20 to 18.

Although Olivia was given a second chance to be back in the competition as a Black Team member, she decided to withdraw as she felt overwhelmed by the competition.

The winner was Jesselyn Lauwreen from Medan, making her the second Sumatran to win the title. Nadya Puteri from Jakarta was the runner-up.

==== Top 18 ====
Rank	Contestant	Age	Origin	Occupation	Status
1	Jesselyn Lauwreen	21	Medan	Fresh Graduate	Winner 29 August
2	Nadya Puteri	25	Jakarta	Bread Seller	Runner-up 29 August
3	Suhaidi "Adi" Jamaan	41	Tanah Datar	Chilli Farmer	Eliminated 22 August
4	Febi "Febs" Astrina Asyagaf	33	Jambi	Marketer	Eliminated 17 July; Black Team 31 July; Returned 7 August; Second Elimination 21 August
5	Bryan C. Ferrysienanda	24	Jakarta	Online Food Entrepreneur	Eliminated 15 August
6	Wynne Intan Pratiwi	24	Palembang	DJ	Eliminated 14 August
7	Digna Thea Damara Gunawan	23	Semarang	Salad Seller	Eliminated 11 July; Black Team 31 July; Returned 7 August; Second Elimination 8 August
8	Jenny Hendrawati	27	Bandung	Online Bakery Owner	Eliminated 7 August
9	Olivia Tommy Putri	24	Surabaya	Property Agent	Eliminated 25 July; Black Team 31 July; Withdrew 31 July
Non-Elimination (18 & 24 July)
10	La Ode Saiful Rahman	25	Pulau Muna	Assistant Chef	Eliminated 11 July
11	Brian Rizky Ali Rachmalika	27	Malang	Transportation Entrepreneur	Eliminated 10 July
Non-Elimination (3-4 July)
12	Yogi Indrayana	41	Bandung	Entrepreneur	Eliminated 27 June
13	Hardian "Seto" Eko Nurseto	37	Bandung	Lecturer	Eliminated 26 June
14	Hygianti Medina Putri Hapsari	18	Semarang	Bread Seller	Eliminated 20 June
15	Wita Wulandari	37	Tasikmalaya	Retired Marketing Leader	Eliminated 19 June
16	Dudiek Hidayat	24	Bekasi	Koi Fish Seller	Eliminated 13 June
17	Ahmad Dani Arisa	18	Banyuwangi	Student	Eliminated 12 June
18	Fasha Denisa	33	Jakarta	Food Stylist	Eliminated 6 June

=== Season 9 (2022) ===
MasterChef Indonesia Season 9 has aired since 22 January 2022, with all three judges returning. The number of finalists increased from the previous 18 to 22 contestants.

This season introduces a new format during the audition round. If all three of the judges give a "yes" to a contestant, that contestant will wear a white apron and automatically proceed to the Gallery. However, if only two out of the three judges give a "yes", then the contestant will have to wear a gray apron and go to the Bootcamp round before the gallery.

The winner of this season was 24-year-old Cheryl Puteri Gunawan, with Palitho Aventus Simanjuntak as the runner-up.

==== Top 22 ====
Rank	Contestant	Age	Origin	Occupation	Status
1	Cheryl Puteri Gunawan	24	Surabaya	Content Creator	Winner 24 April
2	Palitho Aventus Simanjuntak	29	Malang	Cafe Owner	Runner-up 24 April
3	Muhammad Arsyan Dwianto	25	Jakarta	Burger Seller	Eliminated 17 April
4	Tjoa Victor Agustino Wibowo	24	Semarang	Online Food Entrepreneur	Eliminated 16 April
5-6	Teresa Machel Wie	24	Jakarta	Juice Entrepreneur	Eliminated 10 April
5-6	Raden Indra Lesmana	37	Cibinong	Freelancer	Eliminated 5 March; Black Team 19 March; Returned 26 March; Second Elimination 10 April
7	Dewi Valerie Taniaty	25	Medan	Housewife	Eliminated 3 April
8	Mei-Mei Tanujaya	46	Pekanbaru	Owner Baking House	Eliminated 2 April
9-10	Marsha "Ray" Rayhan Paramarta	26	Jakarta	Chicken Noodle Seller	Eliminated 27 March
9-10	Devy Anastasia	24	Jakarta	Laundry Entrepreneur	Eliminated 13 March; Black Team March 19; Returned 26 March; Second Elimination 27 March
11-12	Christopher Jonathan Alden	23	Surabaya	Fresh Graduate	Eliminated 26 March
11-12	Aurelia Shearen Chang	27	Jakarta	Yogurt Drink Entrepreneur	Eliminated 5 March; Black Team March 19; Second Elimination 26 March
13-14	Billy Leonardo	31	Bali	Cleaning Service Entrepreneur	Eliminated 27 February; Black Team 19 March; Second Elimination 19 March
13-14	Dara Rahma Illahiya	34	Bandung	Cake Decorator	Eliminated 5 March; Black Team 19 March; Second Elimination 19 March
Non-Elimination (26 February)
15-16	Dewi "Noni" Tiara Regita	24	Jakarta	Catering Entrepreneur	Eliminated 20 February
15-16	Okky Ho	42	Bandung	Trader	Eliminated 20 February
17	Didy "Ocit" Rosyidi	29	Serang	English Teacher	Eliminated 19 February
18	Zulfikar "Joel" Hazli	48	Aceh	Restaurant Entrepreneur	Eliminated 13 February
19	Josua "Joe" Bachtiar	28	Jakarta	Private Sector Employee	Eliminated 12 February
20	Dinda Alamanda	31	Bengkulu	Housewife	Eliminated 6 February
21	Dea Prasetyawati Wibowo	40	Malang	Dean	Eliminated 5 February
22	Aprillia "April" Noerdjaja	25	Jakarta	Food Entrepreneur	Eliminated 30 January

=== Season 10 (2022-2023) ===
The 10th season premiered on 24 December 2022 with all 3 returning judges. The number of contestants increased from 22 to 24.

The winner is 28-year-old Gio Vergio from Jakarta, with 22-year-old Ami Prachaya from Bogor as runner-up.

==== Top 24 ====
Rank	Contestant	Age	Origin	Occupation	Status
1	Giovanni "Gio" Vergio	28	Jakarta	Expedition Marketing	Winner March 26
2	Fahmi "Ami" Prachaya Ruangroj	22	Bogor	Fresh Graduate	Runner-up March 26
3	Bernardinus Mario Oswin Gitta	19	Yogyakarta	Fresh Graduate	Eliminated January 29; Black Team 11 February; Returned February 12; Second Elimination 19 March
4	Syahril Azwardi	26	Bangkalan	Cafe Supervisor	Eliminated March 18
Non-Elimination (12 March)
5	Surya "Sen" Irawan	33	Surabaya	Chiropractor	Eliminated February 5 Black Team February 11; Returned February 12; Second Elimination 11 March
6	Syaiful Fahmi	30	Bekasi	Food Stylist	Eliminated March 5
7	Anna Madani	30	Jember	Beauty Therapist	Eliminated January 29; Black Team February 11; Returned February 12; Second Elimination 26 February
8	Alicia Angie Wiranata	26	Jakarta	Food Scientist	Eliminated January 25
9	Lidwina "Wina" Shinta Purnamasari Wibisono	37	Surabaya	Housewife	Eliminated January 28; Black Team 11 February; Returned February 12; Second Elimination 19 February
9	Ravi Raffaelo	27	Jakarta	Rice Bowl Entrepreneur	Eliminated February 19
11	Putu "Una" Adinda Sri Fortuna Dewi	21	Bali	Tea Entrepreneur	Eliminated February 19
11	Rommy Gonadi	29	Banjarmasin	Bread Entrepreneur	Eliminated February 19
13	Amanda Arum Sari	29	Magelang	Housewife	Eliminated February 12
13	Amrizal Nuril Abdi	30	Malang	Food Blogger	Eliminated February 12
15	Vivi Dwi Santi	31	Kotabaru	Vet	Eliminated February 5 Black Team February 11; Second Elimination 12 February
16	Agnesia "Agnes" Cahaya	26	Jakarta	Designer	Eliminated January 29; Black Team February 11; Second Elimination 12 February
17	Ayu Kandiningsih	36	Yogyakarta	Disc Jockey	Eliminated January 23
18	Rayhan Akbar	25	Bekasi	Coffee Entrepreneur	Eliminated January 22
19	Nurul "Nisa" Annisa Safitri	24	Palembang	Foodpreneur	Eliminated January 15
20	Alfian Misbachul Munir	19	Sidoarjo	UI/UX Designer	Eliminated January 15
20	Rahman HN	27	Maros	Social Worker	Eliminated January 15
22	Made Budiarta	56	Bali	HR Manager	Eliminated 14 January
Non-Elimination (7–8 January)
23	Jesslyn "Jejes" Shania	24	Bandung	Pastry Seller	Eliminated January 1
24	Rinto Ardiono Bessi	27	So'e	Daily Worker	Eliminated January 1

=== Season 11 (2023) ===
The 11th season premiered on 26 August 2023 with all 3 returning judges. The number of contestants remained the same from last season at 24. This is the final season for Arnold Poernomo as judge. Belinda Christina from Malang was declared the winner in this season, with Kiki Singarimbun from Medan as runner-up.

==== Top 24 ====
Rank	Contestant	Age	Origin	Occupation	Status
1	Belinda Christina Sianto	22	Malang	Student	Winner November 26
2	Rizkisyah "Kiki" Putra Singarimbun	22	Medan	Restaurant Employee	Runner-up November 26
3	Nick Nierxen	24	Batam	Property Agent	Eliminated September 30; Black Team October 7 Returned October 14; Second Eliminated November 19
4	Nadhifa "Dhifa" Citra Aisyah Nurputeri	25	Bogor	Entrepreneur	Eliminated November 18
5	Johardi "Joe"	33	Tangerang	Bread Entrepreneur	Eliminated November 12
6	Natanayel "Nata" Sianturi	28	Medan	Private Sector Employee	Eliminated November 5
7-8	Harris Bayu Kusuma	33	Surakarta	Restaurant Entrepreneur	Eliminated November 4
7-8	Yogi Ramdhani Wiyanto	22	Sumbawa	Merchant	Eliminated November 4
Non-Elimination (29 October)
9	Fransiskus Christian "Theo" Theodorus Qwensi	22	Surabaya	Student	Eliminated October 1 Black Team October 7 Returned October 14; Second Eliminated October 28
10	Sarjia Samin Ibrahim	31	Sorong	Content Creator	Eliminated October 22
11-12	Liem "Jeff" Jeffry Raharjo	28	Semarang	Private Officer	Eliminated October 21
11-12	Usman M. Nur	47	Jambi	Caterer	Eliminated October 21
13-14	Arrodiyatus "Arro" Samawati Hikmah	40	Bali	Vegan Cafe Owner	Eliminated October 15
13-14	Teddy Cahyadi	28	Bekasi	Content Creator	Eliminated September 30; Black Team October 7 Returned October 14; Second Eliminated October 15
15-16	Rizky Ardhya "Gei" Garini	29	Jakarta	Housewife	Eliminated October 1 Black Team October 7 Second Eliminated 14 October
15-16	Farah Amelia	34	Jakarta	Catering Courier	Eliminated October 1 Black Team October 7 Second Eliminated 14 October
17	Adisurya Satriawan	29	Yogyakarta	Restaurant Owner	Eliminated September 30; Black Team October 7 Withdrew October 14
18	Kamajaya "Raja" Adiwida Patriot	21	Kediri	Fresh Graduate	Eliminated September 24
19	Kanthi Lestari	42	Bali	Caterer	Eliminated September 23
20	Syarifa Maulida Mulahela	25	Lombok	Cake Decorator	Eliminated September 17
21	Andriano "Andre" Calrinto Mami	25	Labuan Bajo	Masters Student	Eliminated September 16
22-23	Joni Priansyah Nicodemus Sinaga Mandalahi	28	Tanah Karo	Farmer	Eliminated September 10
22-23	Rossa Verina Nugroho	26	Blitar	Cafe Owner	Eliminated September 10
24	Qisthas Tsana I Noeman	34	Bandung	Design Consultant	Eliminated September 3

=== Season 12 (2025) ===
The 12th season premiered on 8 February 2025 with Juna Rorimpandey & Renatta Moeloek (for her final season, before being replaced by Karen Carlotta) along with new judge Rudy Choirudin, replacing Arnold Poernomo. The number of contestants increased from 24 to 25. Fajar Gusti Pangestu, a 25-year-old entrepreneur from Tabanan was declared the winner in this season, with 33-year-old Putu Hovit Yusmanjia from Gianyar as the runner-up.

==== Top 25 ====
Rank	Contestant	Age	Origin	Occupation	Status
1	Fajar Gusti Pangestu	25	Tabanan	Entrepreneur	Winner May 17
2	Putu Hovit Yusmanjia	33	Gianyar	Restaurant Owner	Runner-up May 17
3	Andhana "Danny" Adyandra	33	Jakarta	Agroforestry Specialist	Eliminated May 10
4	Desy Caroline	26	Bangka	Beauty Consultant	Elimated May 4
5-6	Wiji Indah Arianti	40	Kediri	Food Stall Owner	Eliminated March 8 Black Team March 23; Returned March 30; Second Eliminated May 3
5-6	Aqilah Natasya Rahman	22	Malang	Entrepreneur	Eliminated March 8 Black Team March 23; Returned March 30; Second Eliminated May 3
7-8	Aulia Zahra Dewanti	22	Kendal	Cake Decorator	Eliminated April 27
7-8	Muhammad Azwar	32	Tanjung Balai	Restaurant Supervisor	Eliminated April 27
9-10	I Wayan Manik Amerta	24	Gianyar	Chicken Supplier	Eliminated April 26
9-10	Malrani Ayu Oktavia	28	Kendal	Village Apparatus	Eliminated April 26
11-12	Sie Vincent "Vinz" Bastian S.	33	Singkawang	Insulation Salesman	Eliminated April 20
11-12	Katarina Kirana Sekarayu	26	Bogor	Restaurant Manager	Eliminated April 20
13	Stephanie Jane Sutanto	25	Probolinggo	Online Cake Business Owner	Eliminated March 22; Black Team March 23; Returned March 30; Second Eliminated April 19
14	Vini Mudsyandari	31	Bekasi	YouTuber	Eliminated April 19
Non Elimination (12-13 April)
15	Ardhitogap "Togap" Siregar	35	Bandung	Professional Conference Organizer	Eliminated April 6
16	Sanggar Renggo Wibowo	35	Pasuruan	Mandhi Rice Merchant	Eliminated March 30
17	Rudi Hartono Panjaitan	32	Porsea	Spice Merchant	Eliminated March 16; Black Team March 23; Second Eliminated March 30
18	Tiara Isdiana	30	Jakarta	Human Resources	Eliminated March 15; Black Team March 23; Second Elimination March 29
19	Puguh Kristanto	25	Mojokerto	Content Creator	Eliminated March 9 Black Team March 23; Second Eliminated March 30
20-21	Lucky "Oky" Reza	33	Bandung	Salon Owner	Eliminated March 8 Black Team March 23; Second Eliminated March 30
20-21	Oji Martoji	34	Mojokerto	Private Employee	Eliminated March 8 Black Team March 23; Second Eliminated March 30
Non Elimination (1-2 March)
22	Hendy Yosafat "Yosa" Tan	30	Banyuwangi	Merchant	Eliminated February 23; Black Team March 23; Second Eliminated March 30
23-24	Calista Azzahra	20	Bogor	Student	Eliminated February 23; Black Team March 23; Second Elimination March 29
23-24	Tintin Suhartini	43	Bandung	Cake Entrepreneur	Eliminated February 23; Black Team March 23; Second Elimination March 29
25	Inez San Dewi	46	Kediri	Caterer	Eliminated February 22; Black Team March 23; Second Eliminated March 30

=== Season 13 (2025-2026) ===
The 13th season premiered on 13 December 2025 with Juna Rorimpandey along with new judge Karen Carlotta & Norman Ismail, replacing Renatta Moeloek & Rudy Choirudin. The number of contestants increased from 25 to 26. For the first time in this season, the Grand Final of MasterChef Indonesia is placing 2 queen of housewives as grand finalists. Stephanie Meyerson, a 30-year-old permanent make-up artist from Pontianak was declared the winner in this season, with 28-year-old Monica Bunga Tania Wibowo from Malang as the runner-up.

==== Top 26 ====
Rank	Contestant	Age	Origin	Occupation	Status
1	Stephanie Meyerson	30	Pontianak	Permanent Make-Up Artist	Winner March 15
2	Monica Bunga Tania Wibowo	28	Malang	Cafe Owner	Runner-up March 15
3-4	Adefah Alsya Arona	29	Jakarta	Villa Owner	Eliminated March 8
3-4	Elsa Brilliantari	29	Lombok	Model	Eliminated March 8
5	Santha "Sandra" Kumari	52	Dolok Masihul	Spice Trader	Eliminated March 7
6	Ragil Viatna	25	Surabaya	Restaurant Owner	Eliminated December 21; Returned January 17; Second Eliminated March 1
7	Jonatan Karo Karo Sinuraya	27	Medan	Restaurant Employee	Eliminated February 28
8-9	I Dewa Gede Oka	27	Klungkung	Restaurant Employee	Eliminated February 22
8-9	Muhammad Septian "Tian" Hidayat	34	Pekalongan	Risol Seller	Eliminated February 22
10	Rizki Fauzi Purbaya	30	Lembang	Research & Development	Eliminated February 21
11	Imam Nur Rohman	26	Bantul	Railroad Employee	Eliminated February 15
12	Mochamad Ibnu Sopian	27	Rajeg	Model	Eliminated January 4 Returned January 17; Second Elimination February 14
Non Elimination (8 February)
13-14	Kemal Hasan	30	Jakarta	Boarding House Owner	Eliminated February 7
13-14	Okky Ferdian	40	Dumai	Yellow Rice Seller	Eliminated January 10; Returned January 17; Second Elimination February 7
15-16	Angeline "Angel" Rudianto	23	Jakarta	Marketing Specialist	Eliminated February 1
15-16	Irene "Icen" Wahyuni Hartono	41	Tulungagung	Housewife	Eliminated February 1
17-18	Caroline "Oline" Alfonsus	25	Palembang	Cake Decorator	Eliminated January 31
17-18	Nina "Alpa" Nurik	26	Jembrana	Soap Opera Actress	Eliminated January 31
19-20	Gaga "Aga" Bowo Prastomo	26	Jogjakarta	MC	Eliminated January 24
19-20	Vito Lo	31	Pontianak	Cafe Consultant	Eliminated January 24
21	Mickey Alexander	31	Bogor	Musician	Eliminated January 10; Second Eliminated January 11
22-24	Alifah "Alifa" Syamsul	29	Makassar	Digital Product Manager	Eliminated January 4 Second Eliminated January 17
22-24	Bryan Jethro Alexandro Ganda	19	Manado	Student	Eliminated January 4 Second Eliminated January 17
22-24	Rachel Yunitasari Sanjaya	26	Surabaya	Banker	Eliminated January 4 Second Eliminated January 17
Non Elimination (28 December)
25	Denista "Denis" S Ikom	31	Lampung	Make-up Artist	Eliminated December 27; Second Eliminated January 11
26	Ahmad Maulana "Maro" Syarif	24	Pati	Translator	Eliminated December 21; Second Eliminated January 11

== Controversy ==
=== Eddy Siswanto's Recipe Paper ===
In season 6, when the cooking time was almost half an hour, Eddy cheated by bringing a written recipe. Chef Arnold who saw Eddy's actions immediately took the recipe paper from Eddy and immediately disqualified Eddy from this challenge. After being removed from Masterchef Indonesia Season 6, on his YouTube account, Eddy regretted his actions which were considered shocking throughout the history of Masterchef Indonesia. In addition, he said Everything thus it's Moron Eddy Siswanto has been Disqualification the action of bringing his recipe notes because he forgot the ingredients in making the dish. That's why he was forced to cheat by bringing the recipe notes in order to finish the special dish quickly and get praise from the Masterchef Indonesia judges. After admitting his mistake, Eddy immediately apologized to the participants and judges of Masterchef Indonesia. Eddy hopes that his embarrassing incident that tarnished Masterchef Indonesia will not happen again in the next season.

=== Racism and social discrimination accusation ===
Belinda's victory at the end of season 11 was met with backlash. Netizens believed that the cooking skill of the season's runner-up, Kiki, was vastly superior than Belinda, which raised the issue of longstanding racism and social discrimination on the show. Netizens suspected that the judges gave Belinda (Chinese-Indonesian descent) and Kiki (Malay descent) an unfair and disproportionate assessment due to their race and social status. Netizens believed that MCI has a racial preference when choosing a winner because most of the show's previous winners are of Chinese-Indonesian descent, same as Belinda. Netizens also accused MCI of social discrimination, where Belinda is a graduate of prestigious culinary school Le Cordon Bleu in New Zealand (same with many previous MCI winners) while Kiki is a graduate of a vocational high school in Medan. Netizens believed that MCI disregards contestants' cooking abilities and only referring to their ethnicity and educational background when choosing their winner.

The day after the finale episode aired, Kiki's name trended on X (formerly Twitter) in fourth place with more than 85,700 posts., alongside the hashtag #MasterChefChindo (slang for Chinese-Indonesian) which trended on 26–27 November 2023. Netizens also flooded the Instagram accounts of judges Juna and Renatta with criticisms, with Renatta's latest instagram post reaching ten thousand comments. The backlash caused the official Instagram account of MCI to close the comments column on Belinda's winning post. MCI's Instagram account also lost approximately 13,000 followers because of the backlash. In fact, one of the judges on MasterChef Indonesia once stated that the true champion was actually the runner-up, while the actual runner-up finished in third place, because the first-place win had already been prearranged as requested, if the runner-up was also prearranged, then the first-place winner ended up in third position.

On 6 August 2024, the show would renew for season 12 after a 7 month hiatus and eventually premiered on 8 February 2025.

== Awards and nominations ==
Year	Award	Category	Result	Ref
2012	Panasonic Gobel Awards	Program Pencarian Bakat Terfavorit (Favorite Talent Search Program)	Won	
2013	Panasonic Gobel Awards	Program Pencarian Bakat Terfavorit (Favorite Talent Search Program)	Won	
2014	Panasonic Gobel Awards	Program Pencarian Bakat Terfavorit (Favorite Talent Search Program)	Nominated	
2019	Panasonic Gobel Awards	Program Pencarian Bakat Terfavorit (Favorite Talent Search Program)	Won	
2019	Indonesian Television Awards	Program Akhir Pekan Terpopuler (Popular Weekend Program)	Won	
2020	RCTI+ Indonesian Digital Awards	Most Favorite Talent Search	Nominated	
2020	Indonesian Television Awards	Program Akhir Pekan Terpopuler (Popular Weekend Program)	Won	
2021	Indonesian Television Awards	Program Akhir Pekan Terpopuler (Popular Weekend Program)	Won	
2022	Indonesian Television Awards	Program Akhir Pekan Terpopuler (Popular Weekend Program)	Won	
2022	Anugerah Komisi Penyiaran Indonesia (Indonesian Broadcasting Commission Award)	Program Ajang Bakat (Talent Show Program)	Nominated	
2023	Dahsyatnya Awards	Talent Search Terdahsyat (The Most Awesome Talent Search)	Nominated	
2023	Indonesian Television Awards	Program Akhir Pekan Terpopuler (Popular Weekend Program)	Won	
2024	Indonesian Television Awards	Program Akhir Pekan Terpopuler (Popular Weekend Program)	Won	
2025	Indonesian Television Awards	Program Akhir Pekan Terpopuler (Popular Weekend Program)	Won	
