= Navika Sagar Parikrama II =

2024-2025 circumnavigation of globe

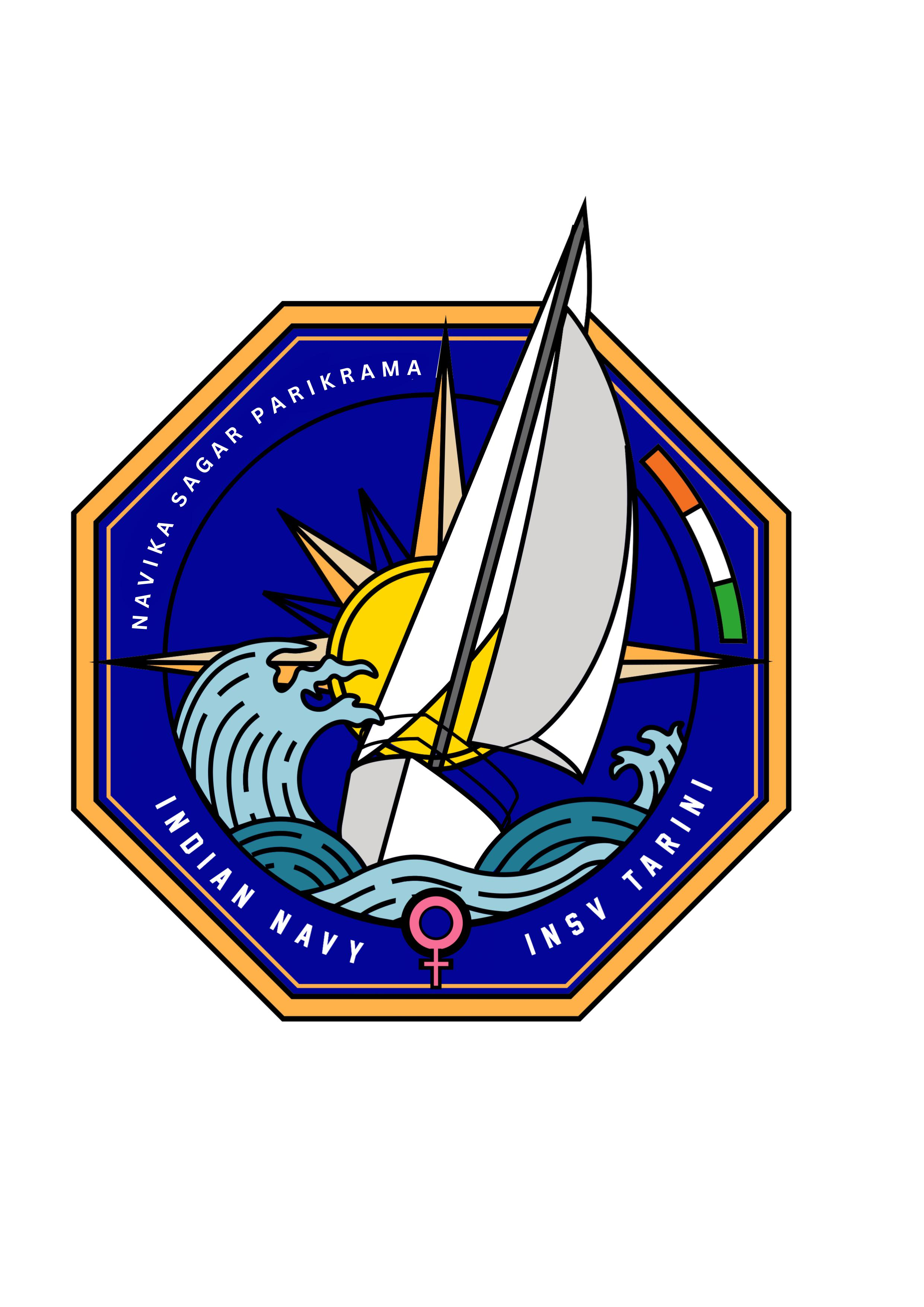
Emblem of the Navika Sagar Parikrama II expedition

Navika Sagar Parikrama II (lit. 'Sailors' Sea Circumambulation') or Navika Sagar Parikrama 2 /NSP II was an ambitious circumnavigation of the globe conducted successfully by two female officers of the Indian Navy. Unlike the previous edition that had a six-woman crew, this time only two women officers, Lt Cdr Roopa A and Lt Cdr Dilna K attempted to circumnavigate the globe in two-handed mode. They undertook the journey onboard INSV Tarini. The second edition of the naval expedition symbolises India’s maritime aspirations, and highlights Indian Navy’s commitment to excellence and Nari Shakti under the motto: “Courageous Hearts, Boundless Seas.”

== Significance ==
In recent years, the Indian Navy tried to enhance its ocean sailing skills through its Sail Training Ships INS Tarangini and INS Sudarshini and circumnavigation onboard INSV Mhadei and INSV Tarini. The latest voyage was a continuation of the previous Navika Sagar Parikrama voyage conducted by six female officers of the navy in 2026.

The Indian Navy unveiled a logo for the expedition on 15 September 2024. The logo has octagonal shape in the centre depicting the Indian Navy, while the sun signifies a celestial body and the compass, guiding the sailors through the challenging seas. The sailboat making its way through the ocean symbolizes the spirit of adventure and the resilience of the voyagers. The two women double-handed crew of the expedition is a testament to the Indian Navy's commitment to fostering gender equality and excellence.

The second circumnavigation of INSV Tarini was a significant step forward in India's ocean sailing enterprise and maritime endeavours, showcasing the nation's growing prominence in global maritime activities and gender equality. The primary goal of this mission wasto promote seamanship, maritime heritage, and gender equality through a challenging circumnavigation of the globe.

== Crew ==
While the first Navika Sagar Parikrama I (2017–18) had a six-member all women crew, Navika Sagar Parikrama II will have just two-member women crew who will circumnavigate the globe. They are:

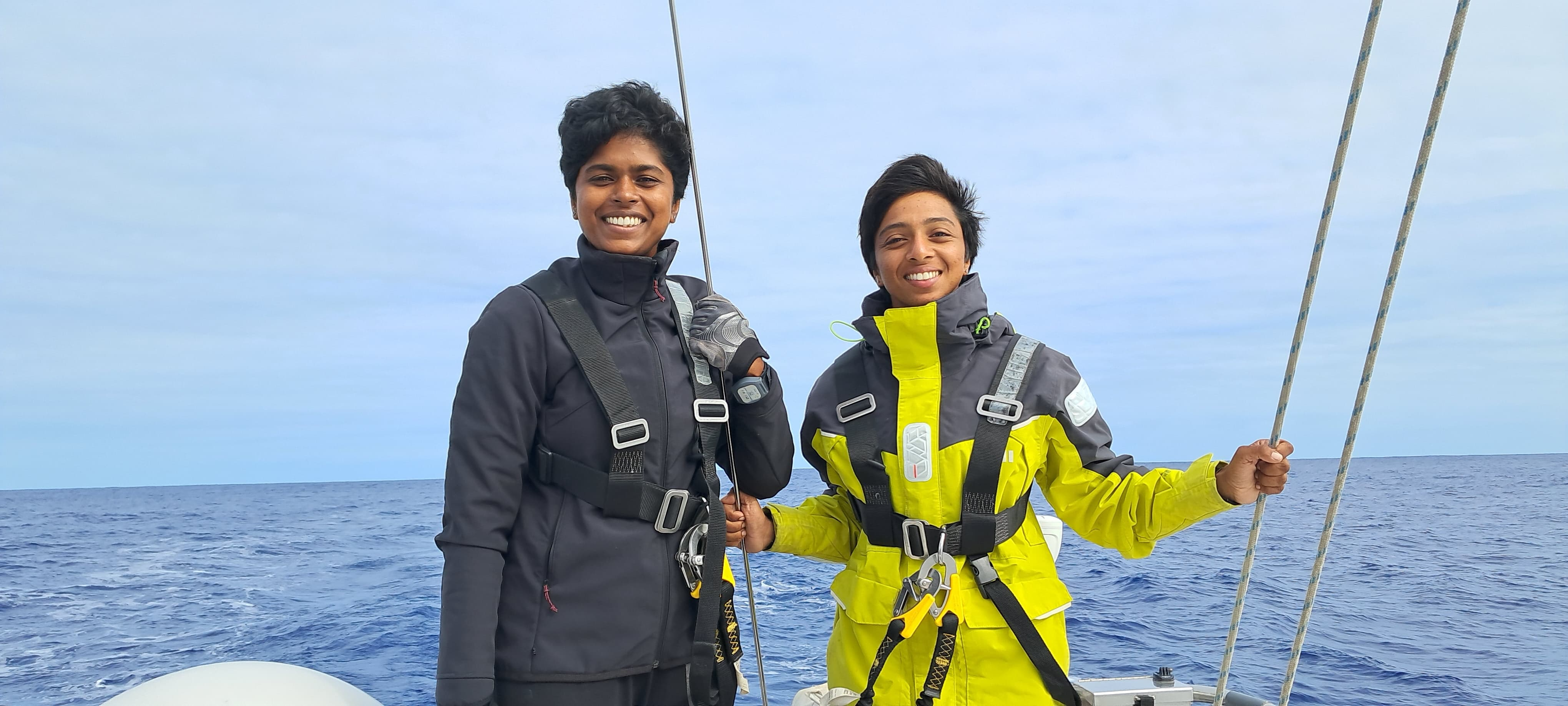
Navika Sagar Parikrama II crew

- Lt Cdr Roopa A is from Pondicherry. She joined the Indian Navy in June 2017. Her father is G. P. Alagirisamy, who served in the Indian Air Force.
- Lt Cdr Dilna K is from Kozhikode, Kerala. Commissioned into Indian Navy in June 2014, her father is late Devadasan, who served in the Indian Army.

The two crew trained for three years clocking 38,000 nautical miles, handling the sailing vessel INSV Tarini all by themselves, accumulating thousands of nautical miles in experience. The two women officers will become the first from India to accomplish such a feat in double-handed mode. The two officers were previously part of the six-member crew that had participated in trans-oceanic expedition from Goa to Rio de Janeiro via Cape Town and back in 2023. Then the two women officers undertook a sailing expedition from Goa to Sri Vijaya Puram (earlier Port Blair) and back in double-handed mode. They further honed their skill by successfully undertaking a sortie from Goa to Port Louis, Mauritius, again in dual-handed mode, early in 2024. The two women officers have received their training and mentoring under various Indian Navy officers who have circumnavigated the globe, including ace circumnavigator and Golden Globe Race competitor, Cdr Abhilash Tomy. The blue water expedition was an arduous test of the skills, physical endurance, and mental fortitude of the two crew members.

== Voyage ==
=== Departure ===
The circumnavigation was flagged-off on 2 October 2024, the birth anniversary of Mahatma Gandhi from the Naval Ocean Sailing Node, INS Mandovi near Panaji, Goa by Admiral Dinesh K Tripathi, Chief of the Naval Staff, Indian Navy. The two women officers plan to sail on INSV Tarini for around eight months covering around 23,400 nautical miles (43,300 km; 26,900 mi) and returning by May 2025. Navika Sagar Parikrama II is set to contribute towards boosting scientific research in collaboration with National Institute of Oceanography for study on marine microplastics and ferrous content in the seas, Wildlife Institute of India for exploration on Mega Faunas or large sea mammals, and Defence Food Research Laboratory towards providing customized precooked Indian meals. The expedition will follow the same route as the previous edition and move from Goa to Fremantle, Australia, and then to Lyttelton, New Zealand from there to Port Stanley, Falkland Islands, and lastly to Cape Town, South Africa, before returning to Panaji, Goa.

The duo fondly referred to as DilRoo reached their homeport on 29 May 2025, where flag-in ceremony marking their historic achievement was presided over by Defense Minister Rajnath Singh at Mormugao Port of Goa, formally signifying the culmination of the circumnavigation. On the 126th episode of Mann Ki Baat PM Narendra Modi mentioned the names of the two officers, Lt Cdr Roopa A and Lt Cdr Dilna K, for achieving the incredible feat of reaching Point Nemo and raising the Flag of India. Sagar Defense provided drones to capture visual of the entire voyage.

=== First stopover ===
INSV Tarini attempting to circumnavigate the globe by retracing the route of the circumnavigation by the previous edition entered the port of Fremantle in Western Australia on November 9, 2024, after a 39-day voyage of 4,900 nautical miles. It is the first port of call in the Navika Sagar Parikrama II. On its way from starting in Panaji, Goa on October 2, 2024; INSV Tarini faced various weather conditions, from calm seas to fierce winds, with wave heights classified as “sea state 6” on the Beaufort scale. The expedition with Lieutenant Commanders Dilna K and Roopa A on board the boat, crossed Equator on October 16 and Tropic of Capricorn on October 27, 2024. On arrival, INSV Tarini was received by an enthusiastic crowd, including the Consul General of India in Perth, the Defence Advisor from Canberra, and representatives from both the Indian Navy Sailing Association (INSA) and the Royal Australian Navy. The welcoming committee also included Indian Navy veterans living in Australia and members of the media.

The Tamil Association of Western Australia performed traditional music with the Parai Drum and Kombu Tharai drum. After a brief halt, the crew is expected to start the second leg of the expedition to New Zealand around November 24, 2024. The two-member crew of INSV Tarini, Lt Cdr Dilna K and Lt Cdr Roopa A was felicitated in a ceremony organised by Western Australia's Parliament, where members praised their effort.

=== Second stopover ===
Following the same route as the previous edition; INSV Tarini, arrived at Lyttelton Harbour, near Christchurch, New Zealand, on 23 December 2024 instead of the scheduled arrival on 16 December 2024. This is the second stop for the vessel, after its first stop at Perth, Australia. The crew covered a challenging journey of 6,500 km or 3,400 nautical miles from Perth to Lyttelton in 28 days. Crew members Lt. Cdr. Dilna K and Lt. Cdr. Roopa A, upon arrival were warmly welcomed at the harbour by representatives of the Indian High Commission in Wellington, the Royal New Zealand Navy and members of the local Maori community. The second leg of circumnavigation involved crossing of Cape Leeuwin, the Great Australian Bight, Tasmania, and the South Island of New Zealand. The Indian Navy is closely monitoring the journey receiving daily updates. The two member crew is expected to carry out a systems check of the vessel in Lyttelton on 16 December, making any repairs if necessary. All necessary provisions will also be stocked up for the next leg of the journey to Port Stanley, Falkland Islands.

A community interaction with locals and the two crew members is also scheduled during their stay in Lyttelton. After celebrating the New Year in New Zealand the duo left for the longest and most challenging leg of their journey to reach Falkland Islands as their third stop on 4 January 2025. On 9 January 2025 the duo crossed the International Date Line or IDL, marking significant milestone in their circumnavigation. On crossing the IDL the duo adjusted their clocks to account for the date change.

=== Third stopover ===
After leaving Lyttelton Harbour on its way to third stop at Port Stanley, Falkland Islands the vessel experienced three cyclones, passed through Point Nemo, known as the Oceanic Pole of Inaccessibility on January 30, 2025, INSV Tarini has crossed the Cape Horn located at the southern tip of South America, on 15 February 2025. On its way, the sail boat Tarini also passed through the challenging Drake Passage. The boat reached its next stop at Port Stanley few days later after crossing Cape Horn on 18 February 2025, thus completing the third and most challenging phase of the epic journey. On the occasion of International Women’s Day, India's Defence Minister Rajnath Singh interacted with the crew members on board the INSV Tarini, commending the courage, dedication, and resilience of the crew members. The crew then departed for the fourth leg of its journey and intended to reach the next stop of Cape Town, South Africa by April 1, 2025.

=== Fourth stopover ===
On its way from South America, the crew of vessel encountered rough seas and extremely cold temperature coupled with stormy weather conditions, with winds exceeding 93 kmph or 50 knots and waves reaching heights of up to 7 meters or 23 feet; this made the task to reach its fourth stop in NSP II highly challenging and demanding.

INSV Tarini entered Cape Town, South Africa on 1 April 2025 as planned completing the last leg of the adventure before it heads towards home base. The vessel and its two crew members were welcomed in Cape Town by Ms Ruby Jaspreet, Consul General of India at Cape Town, Rear Admiral Lisa Hendricks, Chief of Staff, South African Navy Fleet and the Defence Adviser of India at Pretoria, Captain Atul Sapahia. The South African Naval Band also performed to mark their arrival. The stopover in Cape Town highlights the growing maritime ties between India and South Africa. Such stopovers and interactions are aimed at enhancing maritime security and cooperation, addressing common challenges in the region while fostering practices for safe and secure seas. The vessel will be at Royal Cape Yacht Club for two weeks for scheduled maintenance and repairs. The crew of the vessel will engage and interact with the South African Navy at Simon’s Town Naval Base and Gordon’s Bay Naval College. Community outreach events have also been planned during their stay. After maintenance and repairs are completed INSV Tarini departed on 15 April 2025 and was to return to Goa by May 2025.

Chief of Naval Staff Admiral Dinesh K Tripathi also interacted with crew of Tarini via video conferencing, after they reached Cape Town. This is the fourth such interaction between the crew and senior Indian Navy officials. He also congratulated the crew for crossing the Prime Meridian on 25 March 2025 and re-entering the Eastern Hemisphere. INSV Tarini became homeward bound after it was flagged off from Cape Town on 15 April 2025 from the Royal Cape Yacht Club in Cape Town, marking the start of the final leg of its global circumnavigation and is expected to reach Goa by end of May 2025. The duo fondly referred to as DilRoo were to reach their homeport on 29 May 2025. The flag-in ceremony marking their historic achievement is to be presided over by Defense Minister Rajnath Singh at Mormugao Port of Goa, formally signifying the culmination of the circumnavigation.

=== Homecoming ===
The Defence Minister Rajnath Singh on Thursday, 29 March 2025; flagged in the sailboat INSV Tarini at the end of the historic circumnavigation of Navika Sagar Parikrama II at Goa’s Mormugao Port. The successful completion of the circumnavigation of the globe over the period of eight months, saw the duo (popularly called #DilRoo) cover a distance of over 25,400 nm crisscrossing four continents, three oceans and three Great Capes. In doing so the crew braved severe weather conditions, extremely cold temperatures, and very rough seas, relying solely on sails and wind power as well as their wit and training. According to the duo, though each leg was challenging, the third leg of the journey from Lyttleton to Port Stanley was the most difficult. Both were awarded the Shaurya Chakra at the 2026 Republic day parade.

== See also ==
- Women in the Indian Armed Forces
