= Navika Sagar Parikrama =

2017 circumnavigation of the globe

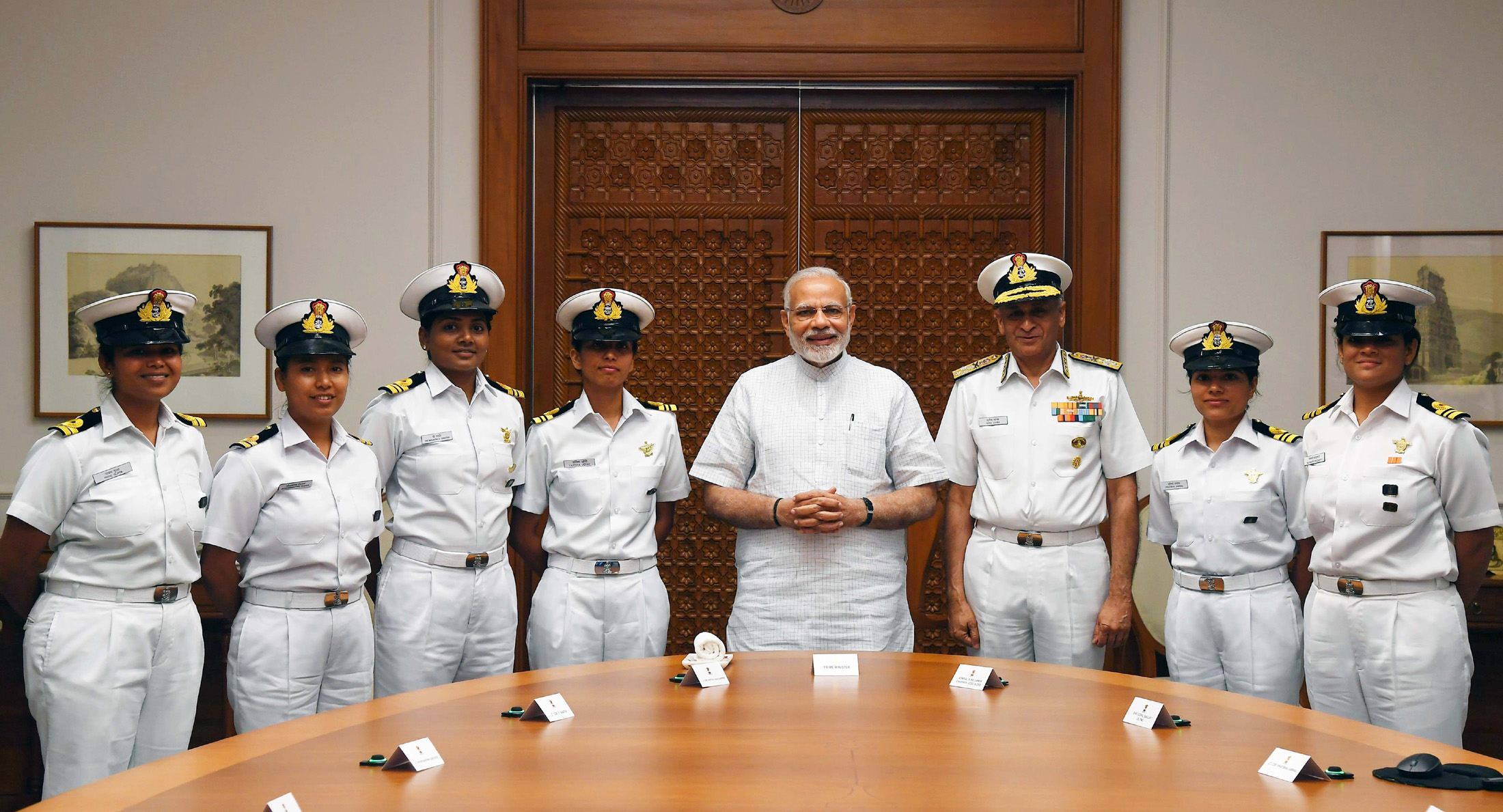
The Navika Sagar Parikrama crew meeting Prime Minister Narendra Modi

Navika Sagar Parikrama (lit. 'Sailors' Sea Circumambulation') was a circumnavigation of the globe by female officers of the Indian Navy. The six-member all-woman team circumnavigated and managed the whole operation in their first-ever global journey, on INSV Tarini. The voyage lasted 254 days, from 10 September 2017 to 21 May 2018, with only four port calls, in Fremantle, Australia; Lyttelton, New Zealand; Port Stanley, Falkland Islands; and Cape Town, South Africa, and a forced technical halt at Port Louis, Mauritius, crossing the equator twice and passing through three oceans. The voyage was originally set to start on September 5, 2017, but a five-day delay happened so that Nirmala Sitharaman, who was recently appointed defense minister, could flag off the crew. The boat returned to INS Mandovi in Goa after travelling 21,600 nautical miles (40,000 km; 24,900 mi). The voyage was showcased in Tarini, a documentary jointly produced by National Geographic and the Indian Navy, premiering at an event at Lady Shri Ram College on 8 March to mark International Women's Day. The voyage prompted National Geographic to start the "Girls Who Sailed" campaign, to tell tales of "grit and determination".

== Significance ==
The significance of Navika Sagar Parikrama voyage is in with consonance with National policy to women empowerment to attain their full potential, showcase India’s Nari Shakti on world platform and help revolutionise attitudes and mindset towards women by raising the visibility of their participation in challenging environment. The voyage also aims to showcase the Make in India initiative of the government by sailing on board an Indian built INSV Tarini. It also encourages use of environment friendly non-conventional renewable energy; as the ship harnesses wind. The crew will also monitor and report marine pollution levels. Apart from that the crew is also expected to interact with local people of Indian origin as well as collate and update Meteorological/Ocean Wave data on daily basis for analysis by research and development organisations and India Meteorological Department for a better forecast the weather. The voyage was important for the women as their men officers did not believe that their team would complete the voyage. The real inspiration behind the voyage was of Vice Admiral Awati (Param Vishisht Seva Medal, Vir Chakra) who wanted to witness a circumnavigation of the globe by an all-woman team on an Indian-built sailboat. The logo for the voyage was unveiled in early 2017.

== Training ==
The crew was selected in 2014 from 40 applicants out of 500 women naval officers in service. Many candidates however dropped out after their families denied them permission out of fear. Chosen from different cadres in service, the women were trained in the aspects of navigation, communication, repair and maintenance. Prior to the circumnavigation, the crew trained for nearly three years which included theoretical training at various Indian Naval schools in Mumbai and Kerala. Followed by hands on training on INSV Mhadei and INSV Tarini. The crew trained under India's first solo circumnavigator Captain Dilip Donde till 2016. The team undertook various sailings from Goa to Porbandar, Mumbai, Karwar, Mauritius in 2016 and 2017, and a 43-day voyage from Goa to Cape Town in 2016. Two of the Navika Sagar Parikrama team also participated in the Cape to Rio Race 2017, as part of the training, onboard INSV Mhadei from Cape Town who led a mixed crew of men and women into the race. Team Tarini sailed for 22,000 nautical miles on board INSV Mhadei and INSV Tarini as part of their training.

== Nari Shakti Puraskar ==
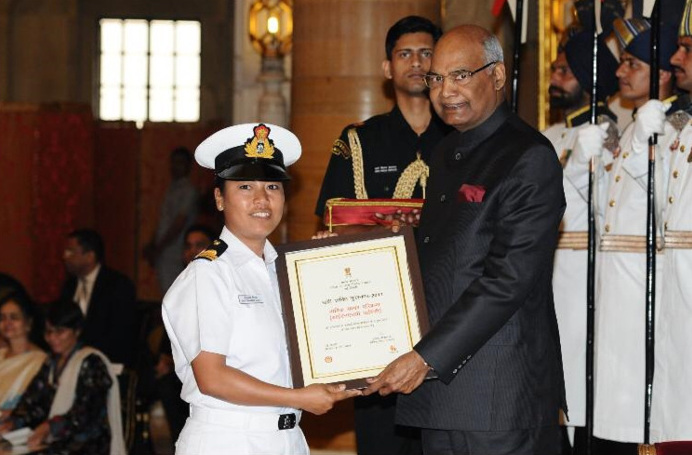
S Vijaya Devi and the Nari Shakti Puraskar

On the occasion of International Women's Day on 8 March 2018 the crew of INSV Tarini that is part of Navika Sagar Parikrama namely Lt Cdr Vartika Joshi, Lt Payal Gupta, Lt Cdr Pratibha Jamwal, Lt Cdr P Swathi, Lt Aishwarya Boddapati, and Lt Shourgrakpam Vijaya Devi were conferred the Nari Shakti Puraskar for outstanding contribution towards women empowerment. The award presented by Ramnath Kovind, the President of India was received by Lieutenant S Vijaya Devi, who is incidentally Northeast India's first woman sailor on behalf of the team of INSV Tarini.

== Crew ==
The crew was shortlisted after receiving applications for volunteers for the voyage. The expedition was flagged off by Defence Minister Nirmala Sitharaman in Goa on 10 September 2017. The crew comprised:

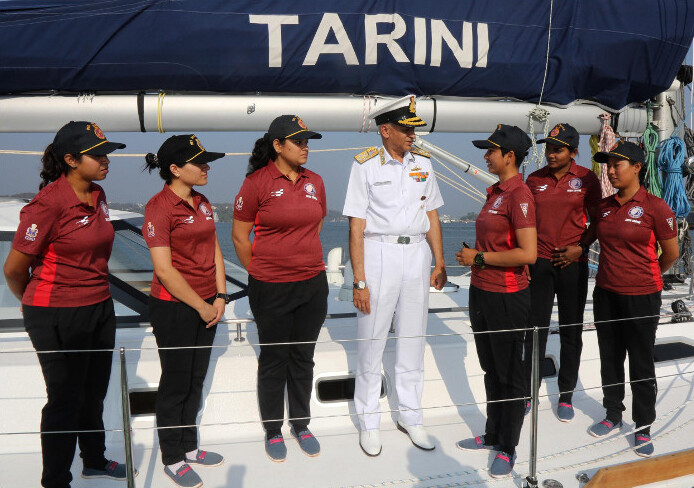
Naval Chief Admiral Sunil Lanba with the crew

- Lt Cdr Vartika Joshi, also the skipper, from Uttarakhand
- Lt Cdr Pratibha Jamwal, from Himachal Pradesh
- Lt Cdr Aishwarya Boddapati, from Telangana
- Lt Cdr P Swathi, from Andhra Pradesh
- Lt Shourgrakpam Vijaya Devi, from Manipur
- Lt Payal Gupta, from Uttarakhand

The six members were conferred with Nau Sena Medal for completing the arduous journey, in the list of gallantry award winners announced on 14 August 2018, the eve of India's 72nd Independence Day.

== Life on the Voyage ==
The voyage on INSV Tarini was fraught with danger, many times the crew was caught up in gale and faced waves as high as nine-storey building with speed up to 70 knots or 120 kmph. The crew also suffered from extreme weather conditions, starting with 45 degrees in India, 12 degrees in Australia, 0 degree in New Zealand and sub-zero in Pacific Ocean. The crew cooked food according to the weather, sticking to ready to eat foods during bad weather. The crew kept a stock of 400 litres of fresh water for every 40 days. This after crew faced water shortage while moving towards its first stop, and were forced to collect rain water for survival. A team of two officers was always on deck to keep watch of the sea and change in weather in an eight-hour shift. While on the voyage from Australia, the crew witnessed a rare phenomenon, Southern Lights or Aurora Australis and even bioluminescence. During the voyage they encountered lot of aquatic life including dolphins, sperm whales, killer whales, sharks and albatross. While crossing the Pacific the crew encountered a massive storm that lasted almost a whole day, with winds up to 130 km/h. The crew celebrated birthday of Vartika Joshi, Pratibha Jamwal, Payal Gupta, S Vijaya Devi and also the boat INSV Tarini, baking cakes while at sea. They even celebrated crossing of equator with cake. They regularly made Chapatti on board. On Diwali they even made eco-friendly diyas with atta, used surgical cotton and ghee to light them, and set them afloat in the ocean.

== First Stop ==
INSV Tarini attempting to circumnavigate the globe entered the port of Fremantle in Western Australia on 23 Oct 2017 on completion of first leg of their journey. On arrival to Australian shore, the crew was greeted by High Commissioner of India to Australia Dr. A. M. Gondane and by a large number of local community. During their two weeks stay in Perth, the crew met representatives of Western Australia Government, members of WA Parliament, and Councils of City of Perth and City of Fremantle. The crew also interacted with students from local schools as well as with Indian diaspora, visited Indian Ocean Marine Research Centre at UWA, UNESCO’s Intergovernmental Oceanographic Commission office and Bureau of Meteorology in Perth. On 5 Nov 2017 after two week stay the crew left Fremantle, Australia for its onwards journey to Lyttelton, New Zealand on its second leg.

== Second Stop ==
INSV Tarini on 29 November 2017 entered the Lyttelton port in New Zealand on its second leg of maiden voyage to circumnavigate the globe. The crew were welcomed by Indian High Commissioner to New Zealand Sanjiv Kohli. The vessel has covered over 7800 nautical miles from its starting point in Goa, crossing the Equator on 17 September 2017 and Cape Leeuwin on 9 November to reach here. INSV Tarini was thrown open to visitors at Lyttelton Port on 3 December and nearly 200 people visited the vessel. On 12 December 2017 the crew left for the third leg of its journey towards Falkland Islands. During their two weeks stay the crew visited Rehua Marae, a traditional Maori cultural centre. They also visited a few tourist destinations near Christchurch, including Hanmer hot springs and the French harbour, Akaroa as well as Naval Point Yacht Club, Canterbury and Ara Institute, New Zealand, where a presentation on Navika Sagar Parikrama was given to audience. The crew on 5 December was welcomed by the city of Christchurch with a traditional festive march, known as the Santa Parade. More than 200 school children attended a presentation and interaction session with the crew at Prebbleton School.

== Third Stop ==
INSV Tarini on 21 January 2018 entered the Port Stanley in Falkland Island on its third leg of maiden voyage to circumnavigate the globe. The crew had a testing time while crossing the Pacific Ocean as it experienced rough weather and stormy winds that spanned 41 days. Add to it the extremely cold climate condition they had to overcome. The crew reportedly endured sea wind in excess of 60 knots and ocean waves of up to 7 meters on this leg of the passage. The crew was welcomed by Mr Nigel Philips, CBE, Governor of the Falkland Islands, and Her Majesty's Commissioner of South Georgia and the South Sandwich Islands. As part of their stay in harbour, the crew interacted with students from Falkland Islands Community School for Secondary Education, Brownies and Girl Guides, Beavers and Boy Scouts and young adults from the Hockey Club. The crew of INSV Tarini after spending a fortnight in the port departed on its 4th leg of journey on 4 February 2018 for its onward journey to Cape Town, South Africa.

== Fourth Stop ==
On its last leg before home stretch to Goa, INSV Tarini reached the 4th stop of Cape Town on 2 March 2018. So far the vessel has covered over 17,500 nautical miles from its start in Goa since September 2017. The vessel is expected to reach its home port of Goa by April 2018 by which time it would have completed 22,000 nautical miles. The crew was received in Cape Town by Mayor Helen Zille, Ruchira Kamboj, High Commissioner of India to South Africa, Indian Consul General of Johannesburg and Cape Town, as well as chairperson of Western Cape and other South African Sailing Associations as well as members of Indian diaspora with bouquets, dhol beats and Holi colour. As the crew was busy with completing its circumnavigation, crew didn't forget to make their followers aware of their activities in real time with blogs and social media updates. Lt. Aishwarya Boddapati has described what she felt seeing the aurora lights in December, 2017; celebrating a crewmember’s birthday at sea, visiting dignitary, and basking in the beauty around her. The crew left Cape Town for its home stretch on 14 March 2018, but before leaving attended several functions organised in their honour. They met legendary former South African cricketer Jonty Rhodes, MasterChef South Africa 2014 Kamini Pather and 8 time South Africa Wind Surfing Champion Roxy Davis as well as Lewis Pugh, who is the first person to complete a long-distance swim in every ocean of the world and also a UNEP Patron of the Ocean.

== Home Coming ==
INSV Tarini after completing their epic journey reached Goa on 21 May 2018 after completing 21, 980 nautical miles journey. The crew members namely Vartika Joshi, Payal Gupta, Pratibha Jamwal, P Swathi, Aishwarya Boddapati & S Vijaya Devi were welcomed by Nirmala Sitharaman, the defence minister of India and Admiral Sunil Lamba, the Indian Navy chief. The team completed the expedition called Navika Sagar Parikrama referring to circumnavigation of the globe in 254 days. The crew passed Indian Ocean, Atlantic Ocean and Pacific Ocean and the Great Capes namely Africa's Cape of Good Hope, Australia's Cape Leeuwin, and South America's Cape Horn. While crossing the Pacific Ocean the crew encountered hurricanes and monstrous waves The boat was actually supposed to be flagged in, in the month of April, 2018. But a damaged steering gear, forced the crew to make an unscheduled stop in Port Louis, Mauritius for emergency repairs. The prime minister of India Narendra Modi also congratulated them on arrival.

=== Media Interaction ===
The six-member crew during the voyage had an opportunity to interact with media abroad at all five countries where INSV Tarini halted during the voyage. However, the crew received a rousing welcome and accolades for their path-breaking expedition from both print and electronic media in India upon their return to India. All leading television channels extensively reported on their success story with live interviews of the crew.

== Navika Sagar Parikrama II ==
Unlike previous installment that had a 6 women crew, this time only 2 women decided to attempt to circumnavigate the globe. They are Indian Navy women officers Lt Cdr Roopa A and Lt Cdr Dilna K, who had to undertake the journey once again on INSV Tarini. The circumnavigation was flagged-off on 2 October 2024, the birth anniversary of Mahatma Gandhi from the Naval Ocean Sailing Node, INS Mandovi near Panaji, Goa by Admiral Dinesh K Tripathi, Chief of the Naval Staff, Indian Navy. The two women officers plan to sail on INSV Tarini for around eight months covering around 23,400 nautical miles and returning by May 2025. The duo fondly referred to as DilRoo reached their homeport on 29 May 2025, where flag-in ceremony marking their historic achievement was presided over by Defense Minister Rajnath Singh at Mormugao Port of Goa, under the motto "Courageous Hearts, Boundless Seas".
