= MasterChef South Africa season 2 =

MasterChef South Africa
- Season 2
- Judges: Andrew Atkinson; Benny Masekwameng; Pete Goffe-Wood
- No. of contestants: 16
- Winner: Kamini Pather
- Runner-up: Leandri van der Wat
- No. of episodes: 28

Release
- Original network: M-Net
- Original release: 11 June – 11 September 2013

Season chronology
- ← Previous; Season 1

The second season of MasterChef South Africa aired on M-Net (DStv channel 101) from 11 June 2013 - 11 September 2013.

This season aired Tuesdays and Wednesdays at 19h30.

The show's expert panel of judges - Andrew Atkinson, Benny Masekwameng and Pete Goffe-Wood - resume their positions to decide who has all the ingredients to become South Africa's next MasterChef.

== Contestants ==
=== Top 16 ===
Contestant	Age	Occupation	Home Town	Episode of Elimination	Place Finished
Kamini Pather	30	Food Writer	Cape Town	Episode 28	1st
Leandri van der Wat	23	Masters Student	Pretoria	Episode 28	2nd
Seline van der Wat	25	Renewable Energy Plant Developer	Pretoria	Episode 28	3rd
Mohamed 'Ozzy' Osman	22	Accounting Student	Johannesburg	Episode 26	4th
Jason Steel	22	Front-of-House Waiter	Lakeside	Episode 25	5th
Tiron Eloff	32	Video Store Clerk	Johannesburg	Episode 23	6th
Karen Els	35	Stay at home Mom	Howick	Episode 21	7th
Amanda Beck	30	Consultant / Waitress	Johannesburg	Episode 20	8th
Joani Mitchell	46	Fashion Designer	Durban	Episode 18	9th
Khumo Twala	19	Student	Johannesburg	Episode 16	10th
Herman Cloete	34	Electrician	Witbank	Episode 14	12th
Mary Martin	30	Dancer	Johannesburg	Episode 14	12th
Sanet Labuschange	47	Financial Manager	Boksburg	Episode 12	13th
Neil Lowe	40	Communications Consultant	Cape Town	Episode 10	14th
Tumi Moche	34	Financial Analyst	Centurion	Episode 8	15th
Shannon Smuts	28	Graphic Designer	Cape Town	Episode 6	16th

== Elimination Table ==
Place	Contestant	Episode												
Place	Contestant	5/6	7/8	9/10	11/12	13/14	15/16	17/18	19/20	21	22/23	24/25	26	27/28
1	Kamini	WIN	IN	WIN	IN	WIN	WIN	IN	WIN	PT	WIN	PT	IN	WINNER
2	Leandri	IN	PT	PT	WIN	IN	WIN	WIN	PT	WIN	PT	IN	WIN	RUNNER-UP
3	Seline	PT	PT	WIN	IN	WIN	WIN	IN	IN	WIN	WIN	PT	IN	ELIM
4	Ozzy	IN	IN	WIN	WIN	PT	WIN	PT	IN	WIN	WIN	WIN	ELIM	
5	Jason	IN	IN	PT	LOW	WIN	WIN	WIN	IN	WIN	PT	ELIM		
6	Tiron	IN	IN	WIN	LOW	IN	PT	WIN	WIN	PT	ELIM			
7	Karen	IN	IN	PT	WIN	WIN	PT	PT	IN	ELIM				
8	Amanda	IN	PT	WIN	WIN	PT	WIN	IN	ELIM					
9	Joani	IN	IN	PT	IN	WIN	PT	ELIM						
10	Khumo	PT	IN	PT	IN	PT	ELIM							
12	Mary	PT	PT	WIN	IN	ELIM								
12	Herman	IN	WIN	WIN	IN	ELIM								
13	Sanet	IN	PT	PT	ELIM									
14	Neil	PT	IN	ELIM										
15	Tumi	PT	ELIM											
16	Shannon	ELIM												

(WINNER) This chef won the competition.
(RUNNER-UP) This chef received second place in the competition.
(WIN) The chef won the individual challenge (Mystery Box Challenge or Invention Test).
(WIN) The chef was on the winning team in the Team Challenge and was safe from the Pressure Test.
(HIGH) The chef was one of the top entries in the Mystery Box Challenge or Invention Test but didn't win.
(CC) The chef received the advantage of competing against a celebrity chef in this challenge. If they won, they advanced farther on in the competition, skipping a number of challenges. The chef could not be eliminated after this challenge.
(IMM) The chef won Immunity in the previous challenge and was safe from cooking.
(IN) The chef was not selected as a top entry or bottom entry in the challenge.
(PT) The chef was on the losing team in the Team Challenge, competed in the Pressure Test, and advanced.
(LOW) The chef was one of the bottom entries in an individual elimination challenge, but was not the last person to advance.
(LOW) The chef was one of the bottom entries in an individual elimination challenge, and was the last person to advance.
(ELIM) The chef was eliminated from MasterChef.

== Episodes ==
MasterChef South Africa Season 2 Episodes
No. overall	No. in season	Title	Original release date
20	1	"Thousands of home cooks from across South Africa lined up in Durban, Cape Town and Johannesburg to audition in the "Cold Dish Auditions" and in tonight's launch episode the 100 top cooks from those auditions travel to the Shine Studios in Johannesburg's trendy new food neighbourhood in Braamfontein to showcase their skills in the all-important "Hot Audition"."	11 June 2013
21	2	"With more than half of the 50 aprons for Boot Camp already handed out in the first episode, tonight the remaining contestants each get 45 minutes in the kitchen to prepare and only 10 minutes to finish off a dish in front of the judges that they hope will be good enough to get them into Boot Camp."	13 June 2013
22	3	"MasterChef judges Andrew Atkinson, Benny Masekwameng and Pete Goffe-Wood fly in on a helicopter to launch the first Boot Camp challenge: peeling potatoes with a knife and then cutting them into perfectly uniform shapes to produce one-and-a-half kilograms of perfect chips. At the end of the potato challenge, 15 contestants hand in their aprons."	16 June 2013
23	4	"For the final leg of Boot Camp the Top 25 decamp to the beautiful Nitrox Art Foundation, a spectacular artist retreat set in 15 hectares of a nature reserve at the Cradle of Humankind World Heritage Site outside Johannesburg, to prepare a spectacular breakfast or brunch dish inspired by their surroundings."	17 June 2013
24	5	"MasterChef judges Andrew Atkinson, Benny Masekwameng and Pete Goffe-Wood each show off their signature sandwich to demonstrate the standard that they're expecting: Pete presents a steak sandwich made with aged beef, relish and "the star of the sandwich: the bread", he points out."	19 June 2013
25	6	"For their first-ever Elimination Challenge the three contestants who didn't make a good Hollandaise quickly enough have to recreate one of Chef Andrew Atkinson's signature dishes: an impressive composition of warthog loin with a smoked egg yolk, baby vegetables and herbed aioli."	23 June 2013
26	7	"MasterChef judge Pete Goffe-Wood explains that each Mystery Box contains seven different ingredients, and that the contestants have to use all seven - seven because the brand new VW Golf 7 will be part of the MasterChef winner's prize package."	26 June 2013
27	8	"Chef Benny Masekwameng explains that the judges selected a variety of fantastic Woolworths cheeses for the Bottom 6 to identify and that the first three contestants to give incorrect answers will go through into the Elimination Challenge."	29 June 2013
28	9	"Each team sends only two members into the pantry for three minutes to gather all the ingredients they need to prepare 10 savoury and 10 dessert pizzas. The teams only have 90 minutes to prepare their pizza dough and get all their toppings ready before their guests arrive, and then they have 30 minutes to prepare and cook their first ten pizzas."	1 July 2013
29	10	"After winning the Pizza Team Challenge seven MasterChef South Africa Season 2 contestants are enjoying a private Masterclass with Chef Chris Erasmus of the Pierneef á La Motte restaurant on the La Motte wine estate outside Franschoek. Meanwhile, in the MasterChef kitchen, the Bottom 7 are taking part in a Spice Identification Pressure Test."	4 July 2013
30	11	"The Top 13 contestants in MasterChef South Africa Season 2 are facing an Invention Test with what Chef Benny Masekwameng describes as that most quintessential of South African ingredients across all cultures: beef. His family slaughters for almost every occasion, Benny explains, especially for big events like weddings, which become three-day eating fests."	7 July 2013
31	12	"The three contestants who failed at the Beef Invention Test face off in an Elimination Challenge in which they have to replicate a signature dish by one of South Africa's top chefs: Chef Henry Vigar of La Mouette restaurant in Sea Point, Cape Town."	10 July 2013
32	13	"Invention Test Day starts on a dramatic note in the MasterChef House when the Top 12 wake to find there is not one drop of dairy to be found in the house. Could that be a clue to their challenge? Indeed, in the MasterChef kitchen Chef Benny Masekwameng explains that the challenge to the Top 12 today is to devise a dish with dairy as the star ingredient."	17 July 2013
33	14	"The five contestants who fared the worst in the Dairy Invention Test face off in what Chef Pete Goffe-Wood describes as their biggest challenge to date: they have to painstakingly recreate a complex liquorice and litchi dessert set for them by one of South Africa's most accomplished chefs."	19 July 2013
34	15	"The Company's Garden is one of the cornerstones of South Africa's culinary history and that sets the theme for this Team Challenge - the Top 10 have to create dishes to reflect South Africa's culinary heritage, and pair their dishes perfectly with one of the Nederburg "Heritage Heroes" range of wines. The judges are members of the South Africa's National Culinary Olympics squad."	30 July 2013
35	16	"The losing team in the Heritage Challenge in Cape Town's Company's Garden faces an Elimination Challenge in which they have to come up with a dish worthy of the menu at Chef Andrea Burgener's award-winning restaurant, The Leopard. Judge Andrew Atkinson warns the contestants that they're expected to think out of the creative box for this challenge."	31 July 2013
36	17	"The Top 9 face another Invention Test but first, a Taste Test to determine who gets to choose the Invention Test's core ingredient. For their Taste Test the Top 9 have to identify fruit by taste, feel and smell, and they have to do it blindfolded! The blindfolded contestants are each given a piece of fruit which they have to identify by smelling and tasting."	6 August 2013
37	18	"The winner of the previous Invention Test cooks off against Chef Jackie Cameron of the KwaZulu- Natal boutique hotel, Hertford House, to win the coveted Immunity Pin and the right to refuse any future Elimination Challenge. The complex dish that Chef Jackie has set for the contestant is one of her signature dishes: Guinea Fowl Coc Au Vin with Gnocchi, Pea Purée and Parmesan Crisps."	7 August 2013
38	19	"This week the Top 8 contestants suddenly find themselves whisked off on a trip to Ethiopia. The contestants are treated to a traditional Ethiopian dinner at one of Addis Ababa's top restaurants, where judge Andrew Atkinson teaches them about the traditional "injera" flatbreads and the different-coloured "wats", or stews."	13 August 2013
39	20	"Tonight's episode finds the Top 8 still in Addis Ababa, Ethiopia, where it is time for yet another Elimination Challenge. This time the two contestants to do battle in the kitchen of Addis Ababa's finest Italian restaurant, Castelli, once rated by philanthropist Bob Geldof as the best Italian restaurant in the world."	14 August 2013
40	21	"MasterChef South Africa Season 2 is down to the Top 7 contestants, but Ethiopia is not yet done with them. Today the contestants are cooking at the world-famous Yaya Long-Distance Athletics Training Centre outside of Addis Ababa, where Ethiopia's famous long distance champions all live and train."	20 August 2013
41	22	"The Top 6 contestants are in Johannesburg's Chinatown, where they have to create authentically Chinese platters of duck dishes for a panel of experts in Chinese cuisine. The contestants are divided into two teams of three each and the members of the losing team will be facing another Elimination Challenge."	21 August 2013
42	23	"In tonight's episode of MasterChef South Africa Season 2 the Top 6 enjoy an inspiring chat with a culinary legend, South African-born Prue Leith, over tea and some traditionally South African tea- time delicacies like "melktert", "koeksusters" and "vetkoek-and-mince"."	27 August 2013
43	24	"The Top 5 face a familiar challenge in tonight's episode: the end-of-the-month empty pantry! The judges challenge the contestants to create something tasty from the scraps of ingredients left over in an almost empty MasterChef pantry, and there's a second twist. The three least successful cooks will find themselves back in the black aprons for another Pressure Test."	28 August 2013
44	25	"Tonight the three cooks who underperformed in last night's end-of-the-month challenge face off in a spectacular Pressure Test to see who will survive to make it to Top 4. They have to recreate Chef Kelvin Joel of the Johannesburg Pastry School's magnificent lemon meringue gateau, which is made up of five distinct and perfectly measured layers and covered in perfect glossy peaks of meringue."	3 September 2013
45	26	"With only four contestants left in MasterChef South Africa Season 2 the pressure is on, and in tonight's episode they face their biggest and most important challenge to date. The winner of tonight's challenge gets to go straight through to the finalé. The loser gets sent home."	4 September 2013
46	27	"The challenge for the second semi-finalist spot is an epic one - the two remaining contestants have to recreate a complex dish based on a "chawanmushi", or a traditional Japanese custard, set for them by one of South Africa top chefs, Luke Dale-Roberts from the acclaimed The Test Kitchen in Cape Town."	10 September 2013
47	28	"In this epic 90-minute final the contestants have to compete in three rounds: a Mystery Box challenge, an Invention Test, and then the final Pressure Test. They will be scored out of a hundred by the three MasterChef judges after each tasting, but the scores will not be revealed until the very end, when the name of South Africa's next MasterChef is announced."	11 September 2013
