= INSV Tarini =

Sailboat ship of the Indian Navy

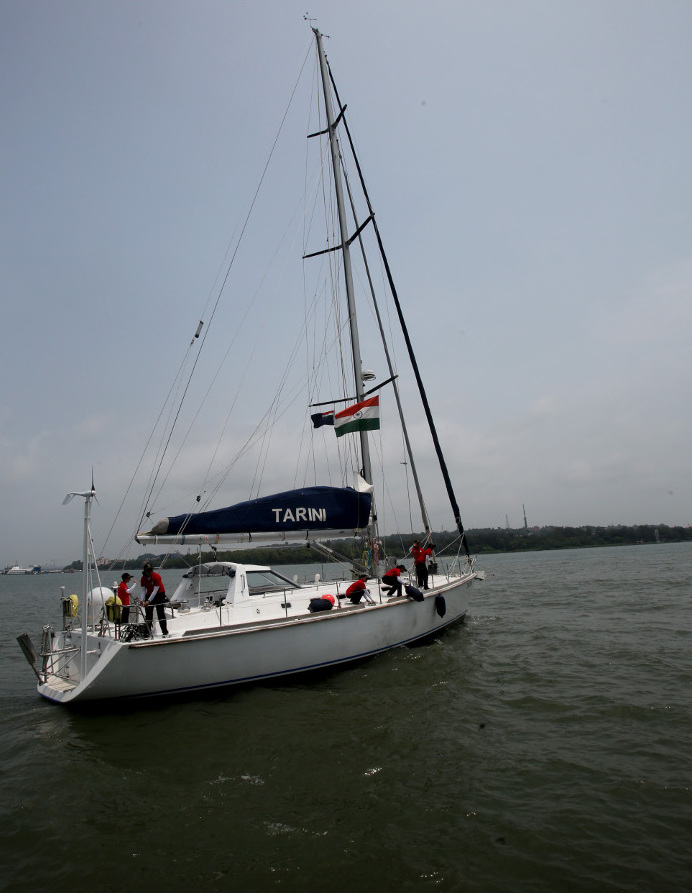
- INSV Tarini

History

India
- Name: INSV Tarini
- Namesake: Tara Tarini temple
- Ordered: 1
- Builder: Aquarius Shipyard Private Limited
- Laid down: 27 March 2016
- Commissioned: 18 February 2017
- In service: 1
- Identification: MMSI number: 419001247; Callsign: AWTZ
- Status: circumnavigation of the globe under Navika Sagar Parikrama I (2017-18), Navika Sagar Parikrama II (2024-25)

General characteristics
- Length: 56 feet

INSV Tarini is the second sailboat of the Indian Navy. (Note: "INSV" stands for "Indian Navy sailing vessel".) She was constructed at Aquarius Shipyard located in Goa. After undergoing extensive sea trials, she was commissioned to Indian Navy service on 18 February 2017.

== Design and description ==
INSV Tarini is a cruising sloop built at the Aquarius Shipyard in Divar, Goa. The vessel was handed over to the Indian Navy on 18 February 2017, christened INSV Tarini, after the Tara Tarini temple. Tarini's hull is built of wood-core and fibreglass sandwich. The boat has six sails, including mainsail, genoa, stay, downwind and storm sail. She is capable of sailing in extreme conditions. The boat measures 56 feet in length. The mast, custom built by Southern Spars, is about 25 meters tall.

Tarini was built to a stock design by Van de Stadt called Tonga 56. The keel for Tarini was laid by Defence Minister Manohar Parrikar at the Aquarius Shipyard on 27 March 2016. The boat was delivered to the navy prior to the scheduled date. She successfully completed her sea trials on 30 January 2017. Several improvements were incorporated in this ship based on experience gained from operating INSV Mhadei. She is fitted with advanced features such as satellite communications, Raymarine navigation suite and a Monitor windvane equipped for emergency steering.

Tarini is similar to her predecessor, the INSV Mhadei, which has travelled over 115,000 nautical miles during her eight years of service. Tarini has done over 35,000 nautical miles till date.

== Service history ==
Promptly upon completion of the commissioning ceremony at INS Mandovi Boat Pool, the crew demonstrated the handling capabilities of the boat by sailing her out of the harbour. An all-woman crew led by Lieutenant Commander Vartika Joshi undertook an expedition to circumnavigate the globe, sailing off on 10 September 2017 and completing the voyage on 21 May 2018.

== Navika Sagar Parikrama I ==
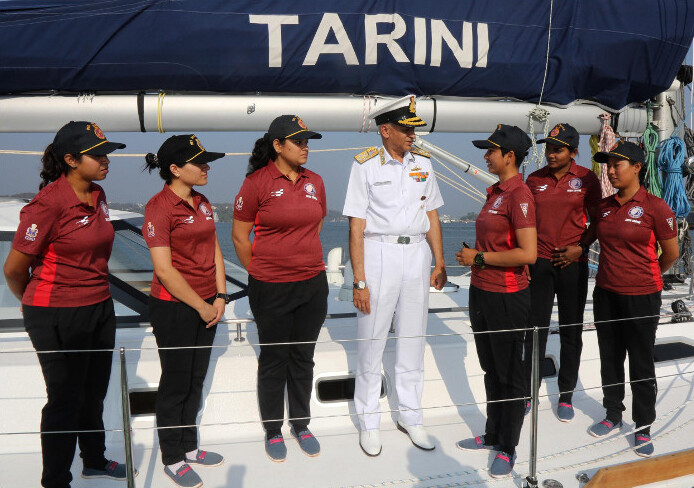
Naval Chief Admiral Sunil Lanba with the all women crew

Navika Sagar Parikrama is the name of expedition for circumnavigation the globe on INSV Tarini by Indian Navy's Women Naval Officers. The six-member all-woman team, led by Lieutenant Commander Vartika Joshi and composed of Lt Commander Vartika Joshi, Lt Commander Pratibha Jamwal, Lt Commander Swati P, Lieutenant Aishwarya Boddapati, Lieutenant S Vijaya Devi and Lieutenant Payal Gupta, circumnavigated and managed the whole operation in this first ever global journey. The voyage which lasted for 254 days, covered 21600 miles, had 5 port calls in Fremantle Australia; Lyttelton, New Zealand; Port Stanley, Falklands, Cape Town, South Africa and finally at Mauritius before returning home to Goa. All six members of the crew were trained for about one year under Captain Dilip Donde, who is also the first Indian to successfully carry out solo-circumnavigation of the globe between 2009 and 2010.

The women had to face strong winds of more than 60 knots and very high waves of up to 7 metres. In addition to successfully circumnavigating the globe the crew also collected and updated meteorological, ocean and wave data on a regular basis for accurate weather forecasts by the National Centre For Medium Range Weather Forecasting (NCMRWF) and the Indian Meteorological Department and reported marine pollution on the high seas.

== Navika Sagar Parikrama II ==
Navika Sagar Parikrama II (lit. 'Sailors' Sea Circumambulation 2') or Navika Sagar Parikrama 2 was the second circumnavigation of the globe by female officers of the Indian Navy. Unlike previous installment that had a 6 women crew, this time only 2 women will attempt to circumnavigate the globe. They are Indian Navy women officers Lt Cdr Roopa A and Lt Cdr Dilna K, who will undertake the journey once again on INSV Tarini. The voyage which lasted for over 8 months, culminated on 29 May 2025 covering over 25,400 nautical miles. The latest voyage in double handed mode retraced the journey of the previous expedition with same for port calls in Fremantle, Australia; Lyttelton, New Zealand; Port Stanley, Falkland islands, and Cape Town, South Africa. The duo referred to as DilRoo in media publications engaged in numerous diplomatic and outreach engagements, interacting with parliamentarians, Indian diaspora, school children, Naval cadets and university faculty across the globe.
