= Reuben Riffel =

South African celebrity chef

- Born: 23 December 1974 (age 51); Franschhoek, Cape Province, South Africa
- Spouse: Maryke Riffel
- Children: 2
- Culinary career
- Cooking style: South African cuisine
- Current restaurants: Reuben's Franschhoek; Reuben's at The Robertson Small Hotel; Reuben's in Paternoster; Racine Restaurant
- Television show: 5 Sterre met Reuben
- Awards won: SA Chef of the Year 2004; Eat Out Restaurant of the Year 2004; Unilever Chef of the Year 2007
- Website: reubens.co.za

Reuben Riffel (born 23 December 1974) is a South African celebrity chef, restaurateur, and media personality known for his food-focused television shows and advertisements, cookbooks and philanthropic work.

== Early life ==
Reuben Riffel was born in Franschhoek, Cape Province, South Africa, on 23 December 1974. He is one of three siblings, and grew up in an area called Groendal, a valley in Franschhoek. Riffel grew up in a family where cooking and eating well played an important role. His mother was intermittently involved in the restaurant industry and his father was involved in the building and construction industry. She occasionally brought home morsels from the restaurants where she worked and in this way Riffel first developed his palate for good food. Riffel attended high school in Paarl. He recalls that he liked working with his hands.

== Career ==
Riffel worked briefly in the building trade, but soon migrated to the hospitality industry, where his first job was that of a waiter at Chamonix Restaurant. He soon migrated to barman, but one day the kitchen had two no-shows and he was moved to the kitchen to assist. He left Chamonix to work with his uncle in a nightclub, but very soon decided that the environment was not one in which he wanted to remain. In 1994, at the age of 20, he went back to Chamonix.

Under the guidance of Christoph Dehosse, he learned about food preparation. When Christoph moved on and was replaced by Richard Carstens, Riffel was made sous chef, in which role he learned the art of preparing vegetables and sauces and running a tight kitchen. His career began with humility and was forged in the principles of hard work as he earnestly learnt from his mentors, being both women in his life, in the early days and the chefs he worked with at the restaurant. One day Richard failed to show up to work, and he was forced to step into the role of executive chef without warning. Many of the patrons expressed their satisfaction at the meals they ate. When Richard never returned to Chamonix, Riffel stepped up, filled the position and was officially made executive chef. Riffel realized that he wanted to be a chef when a French tourist complimented the meal prepared by him as “the best meal he ever had”.

Riffel did not go through any formal channels or study to be a chef, but applied a combination of natural ability and talent. He also learnt from his family and the chefs he worked with, and his success today can be attributed to this. He worked in a few restaurants following this and was reunited with Richard, his mentor at Monneaux, where he continued to grow his skills in the kitchen and experiment with various textures and ingredients. He also traveled overseas and these experiences were also brought back into the kitchen. After honing his skills for three years at Monneaux, Riffel moved to Cambridge, England, to run a startup restaurant, Bruno's Brasserie, which soon drew in the crowds. In 2004, he was offered an opportunity by friends to return to Franschhoek to open a restaurant, named "Reuben’s". Within six months, the restaurant was a success and this was cemented by Reuben winning "Chef of the Year" and "Restaurant of the Year" at the Eat Out Restaurant awards. This elevated the reputation of both the establishment and Reuben alike and the first Reuben's is renowned in Franschhoek as a culinary landmark. Reuben Riffel became a well-known name locally and abroad.

Riffel continued to see opportunities to bring the offering of his food to a broader market and in 2009; a second Reuben's was opened at a five star boutique hotel in the Robertson wine valley, The Robertson Small Hotel. The following year, the opportunity arose to take over Gordon Ramsay’s restaurant, Maze, post its demise, at the One&Only hotel in Cape Town. Reuben’s at the One&Only was thus established with Reuben himself as executive chef. In 2013, Riffel opened two new restaurants, one at Abalone House, a five-star guesthouse in Paternoster and a bistro-style offering named Racine, at the Chamonix Wine Estate in Franschhoek, where his culinary career began. Riffel’s philosophy is to keep things simple, bringing out the natural flavours of each ingredient, and to strive for perfect balance in the finished dish. In an interview with The Wall Street Journal in 2012, he admitted to, at that point, having over 250 cookbooks as he continues to learn, experiment and create new and flavorful dishes.

Riffel continues to be hands-on involved in all restaurants and thus splits his time between establishments.

== Restaurants ==
Year Opened	Restaurant	Location
2004	Reuben's Restaurant	Franschhoek
2009	Reuben's Restaurant	Robertson Small Hotel in Robertson
2011 - 2019	Reuben's Restaurant	One&Only Hotel, Victoria & Alfred Waterfront
2013	Reuben's Restaurant	Abalone House, Paternoster
2013	Racine now Arkeste	Chamonix, Franschhoek
2018	Reuben's Restaurant	The Capital Ivy, Sandton, Gauteng
2021	Let's Frite	Franschhoek and Allee Bleue wine estate, Franschhoek, Western Cape

== Television ==
In 2011, Riffel appeared on both The Martha Stewart Show and The Today Show. In June 2012, he was a guest judge on the second season of the M-Net television cooking competition MasterChef South Africa. In 2013, Riffel also hosted his first Afrikaans cooking show, 5 Sterre met Reuben (5 Stars with Reuben), in which he taught viewers how to make five-star dishes at home. In 2014, he replaced Andrew Atkinson as a permanent judge on MasterChef South Africa, beginning with its third season. Riffel, Pete Goffe-Wood and Benny Masekwameng comprised the judging panel, and Riffel hosted the third season as well as a Celebrity MasterChef season in 2015. He is the face of Robertsons Herbs and Spices and presents television adverts featuring different recipes using Robertsons Herbs and Spices. He is also a brand ambassador for Samsung Home Appliances in South Africa.

== Books ==
Riffel has published three cookbooks with Quivertree Publications:

- Reuben Cooks: Food is time travel (2008), ISBN 9780980265156 – a collection of Reuben's favourite recipes from around the world.
- Reuben Cooks Local (2011), ISBN 9780986981357 – a collection of Reuben's favourite South African feasts and focus on easy-to-follow recipes and local ingredients.
- Braai: Reuben on Fire (2013), ISBN 9780987028457 – a reflection of the quintessential South African cooking style.

== Accolades ==
Riffel's work and cooking style earned him the SA Chef of the Year Award in 2004. In the same year, his Franschhoek-based restaurant was awarded the Eat Out Restaurant of the Year Award. His restaurant was awarded the Eat Out Johnnie Walker Restaurant Award: Top 10 Restaurants in 2004, 2005 and 2006. In 2007, Reuben was awarded the distinguished Unilever Chef of the Year award.

== Personal life ==
Riffel met his wife Maryke while working at Monneaux. They have two children. He lives in Franschhoek, South Africa.

== Charity work and social activities ==
Riffel supports numerous local charities and events. These include his collaboration with chefs Margot Janse, Neil Jewell and Duncan Doherty in 2012 as part of the Celebrity Chefs Challenge Dinner. The event raised funds for the Peninsula School's Feeding Association to assist in fighting hunger in schools. Reuben is involved with the Peninsula School Feeding Association (PFSA), Hope Through Action, Hospice and Pinotage Youth Development Academy (PYDA). He is also one of Paarl School's ambassadors, a school for neurally disabled children. Charity events hosted in 2015 by Riffel include the Chef Reuben Riffel Charity Golf Day in support of the Franschhoek Hospice and the Stop Hunger Now South Africa charity dinner.
