= MasterChef South Africa season 5 =

MasterChef South Africa
- Season 5
- Judges: Zola Nene; Justine Drake; Katlego Mlambo
- No. of contestants: 20
- Winner: Bridget Mangwandi
- Runner-up: Nabila Shamshum
- Location: Cape Town
- No. of episodes: 20

Release
- Original network: SABC 3
- Original release: 13 July – 23 November 2024

Season chronology
- ← Previous; Season 4 Next → Season 6

The fifth season of MasterChef South Africa was announced on 17 January 2024, premiered 13 July 2024 on SABC 3 and concluded on 23 November. The season was won by Bridget Mangwandi while Nabila Shamshum was the runner-up. Bridget is officially the youngest MasterChef winner in the global franchise history, as she is a few months younger than Dara Yu, who was also crowned the world’s youngest winner.

Returning judges for this season were Zola Nene and Justine Drake. They were joined by new judge Katlego Mlambo. Filming took place from 29 April – 8 June 2024 in Cape Town.

== Contestants ==
=== Top 20 ===
Contestant	Age	Occupation	Hometown	Episode of Elimination	Place Finished
Bridget Mangwandi	20	Content creator	Johannesburg	Winner	1st
Nabila "Bealah" Shamshum	23	School secretary	Johannesburg	Runner-up	2nd
Chanel Brink	34	Internal sales consultant	Durban	Episode 20	3rd
Refe Dimbaza	31	Financial accountant	Centurion	Episodes 10 & 19	4th
Lona Rode	35	Brand developer	Tsolo	Episode 18	5th
Penelope "Penny" Rider	65	Retired	Johannesburg	Episode 17	6th
Naledi Matshitse	42	Homemaker	Muldersdrift	Episode 14	7th
Tinashe "Nash" Zwambila	38	Operations director	Johannesburg	Episode 13	8th
Amogelang "Amo" Maluleka	25	Community manager	Johannesburg	Episode 12	9th
Shreya Beekum	22	Recent graduate	Ballito	Episode 10	10th (Withdrew)
Tebogo Mabye	28	Model	Johannesburg	Episode 8	11th
Ketsia Malela	31	Influencer	Kyalami	Episode 7	12th
Tzu "Tina" Ting Long	41	Owner of frozen dumpling store	Cape Town	Episode 5	13th
Zakariyya "Zak" Ebrahim	46	Entrepreneur	Durban	Episode 4	14th
Melanie Jo-Anne van der Merwe	39	Entrepreneur	Stellenbosch	Episode 3	15th
Robyn Africa	28	Law firm manager	Johannesburg	Episode 1	16–20th
Mahlodi Lesego Matuludi	26	Self-employed	Johannesburg	Episode 1	16–20th
Andrew Nye	42	Video producer	Johannesburg	Episode 1	16–20th
Lucas Roothman	33	Rugby recruiter	Stellenbosch	Episode 1	16–20th
Elaine "Ella Bella" E. Consrantinides-Leite	39	Educationalist	Bedfordview	Episode 1	16–20th

== Elimination table ==
Place	Contestant	Episode																			
Place	Contestant	1	2	3	4	5	6	7	8	9	10	11	12	13	14	15	16	17	18	19	20
1	Bridget	IN	LOW	HIGH	WIN	IN	IN	IN	LOW	IN	IN	IN	IN	IN	LOW	WIN	IN	IN	IN	IN	WINNER
2	Nabila	IN	IN	IN	HIGH	IN	WIN	IN	IN	LOW	IN	WIN	IMM	WIN	LOW	IN	WIN	IN	WIN	IN	RUNNER-UP
3	Chanel	IN	IN	IN	LOW	IN	WIN	IN	WIN	HIGH	LOW	IN	WIN	IN	IN	IN	WIN	WIN	IN	IN	ELIM
4	Refe	IN	IN	IN	IN	IN	IN	HIGH	IN	HIGH	ELIM	IN	IN	IN	WIN	LOW	IN	IN	LOW	ELIM	
5	Lona	IN	LOW	LOW	IN	IN	IN	LOW	HIGH	WIN	HIGH	WIN	IMM	LOW	IN	IN	WIN	IN	ELIM		
6	Penny	IN	IN	IN	IN	LOW	IN	HIGH	IN	IN	HIGH	IN	LOW	IN	IN	LOW	IN	ELIM			
7	Naledi	IN	WIN	IMM	IN	HIGH	WIN	IN	LOW	IN	WIN	IMM	IN	LOW	ELIM						
8	Nash	IN	IN	LOW	HIGH	IN	IN	IN	HIGH	IN	LOW	IN	LOW	ELIM							
9	Amo	IN	LOW	HIGH	IN	LOW	WIN	IN	IN	LOW	IN	IN	ELIM								
10	Shreya	IN	HIGH	IN	LOW	IN	WIN	IN	IN	LOW	WD										
11	Tebogo	IN	IN	IN	IN	WIN	WIN	IN	ELIM												
12	Ketsia	IN	IN	IN	IN	HIGH	IN	ELIM													
13	Tina	IN	HIGH	WIN	IN	ELIM															
14	Zak	IN	IN	IN	ELIM																
15	Melanie	IN	IN	ELIM																	
16–20	Andrew	ELIM																			
16–20	Ella Bella	ELIM																			
16–20	Lesego	ELIM																			
16–20	Lucas	ELIM																			
16–20	Robyn	ELIM																			

(WINNER) This chef won the competition.
(RUNNER-UP) This chef received second place in the competition.
(WIN) The chef won the individual challenge (Mystery Box Challenge, Pressure Test or Invention Test).
(WIN) The chef was on the winning team in the Team Challenge and was safe from the Pressure Test.
(HIGH) The chef was one of the top entries in the Mystery Box Challenge, Pressure Test or Invention Test but didn't win.
(CC) The chef received the advantage of competing against a celebrity chef in this challenge. If they won, they advanced farther on in the competition, skipping a number of challenges. The chef could not be eliminated after this challenge.
(IMM) The chef won Immunity in the previous challenge and was safe from cooking.
(IN) The chef was not selected as a top entry or bottom entry in the challenge.
(PT) The chef was on the losing team in the Team Challenge, competed in the Pressure Test, and advanced.
(LOW) The chef was one of the bottom entries in an individual elimination challenge, but was not the last person to advance.
(LOW) The chef was one of the bottom entries in an individual elimination challenge, and was the last person to advance.
(WD) The chef chose to withdraw from MasterChef.
(ELIM) The chef was eliminated from MasterChef.

== Episodes ==
MasterChef South Africa Season 5 Episodes
No. overall	No. in season	Title	Original release date
86	1	"Final Audition"	13 July 2024
The top 20 contestants must each cook for a final place in the Top 15.
87	2	"Apple of Your Eye"	20 July 2024
Mystery Box: The Top 15 contestants cook for the apple of their eye. The main ingredient that must feature in the dish is apple. The winner wins immunity from the next elimination.
88	3	"Legendary Pepper Steak Pie"	27 July 2024
Pressure Test: The Top 15 must recreate chef Nokx Majozi's legendary pepper steak pie. Will they rise to the occasion or crumble under the pressure?
89	4	"It's in the Stars"	3 August 2024
Invention Test: The chefs must prepare a dish for one of the three judges complimenting their star signs.
90	5	"Fashion and Food"	10 August 2024
Invention Test: The chefs get paired with wonderful designs. They must create a dish resembling the design they paired with.
