= MasterChef South Africa season 6 =

MasterChef South Africa
- Season 6
- Judges: Zola Nene; Justine Drake; Katlego Mlambo
- No. of contestants: 20
- Winner: Andrew "Benjie" Benjamin
- Runner-up: Candice Meth
- Location: Cape Town
- No. of episodes: 26

Release
- Original network: e.tv
- Original release: 22 February – 16 August 2026

Season chronology
- ← Previous; Season 5

The sixth season of MasterChef South Africa was announced on 12 September 2025 and premiered on 22 February 2026 on e.tv.

Zola Nene, Justine Drake and Katlego Mlambo returned as judges, with the number of episodes increasing to 26 compared to the previous season's 20. Filming took place at Atlantic Studios, Cape Town from 3 November 2025 to 5 December 2025, produced by Homebrew Films for Primedia Studios. The season was won by Andrew "Benjie" Benjamin, while Candice Meth was the runner-up.

== Contestants ==
=== Top 20 ===
Contestant	Age	Occupation	Residence	Episode of Elimination	Place Finished
Andrew "Benjie" Benjamin	40	Maintenance worker	Kimberley	Winner	1st
Candice Meth	39	Healthcare risk management team leader	Durban	Runner-up	2nd
Simele Shange	38	Entrepreneur	Johannesburg	Episodes 22 & 25	3rd
Nkululeko Ngubane	35	Graphic designer	Johannesburg	Episode 23	4th
Jeshen Govender	31	Tax consultant	Johannesburg	Episode 21	5th
Reshoketjoe "Shoki" Ramontja	30	Social worker	Johannesburg	Episode 19	6th
Calvin Silson	30	Business development manager	Durban	Episode 17	7th
Ntobeko Dlamini	28	Entrepreneur	Johannesburg	Episode 16	8th
Keith Reddy	38	HR manager	Boksburg	Episode 15	9th
Phil Munda	33	General surgeon	Johannesburg	Episode 14	10th
Joshua "Josh" Lotz	25	Model	Johannesburg	Episode 11	11th
Lesego Motshana	24	Model	Johannesburg	Episode 10	12th
Mahlatse Mongatane	23	Hospitality student	Polokwane	Episode 9	13th
Karen van der Merwe	38	Personal assistant	Johannesburg	Episode 8	14th
Bandile "Bandziva" Madinane	31	Radio host	Durban	Episode 5	15–16th
Myles Heneke	35	Cultural producer	Johannesburg	Episode 5	15–16th
Suhael Raghunath	28	Dispatcher	Durban	Episode 3	17th
Ali Sonday	30	Senior attorney	Paarl	Episode 2	18th
Chanelle Gale	38	Food and beverage manager	East London	Episode 1	19–20th
Rejane Gwynne	50	Fashion entrepreneur	Malgas	Episode 1	19–20th

== Elimination table ==
Place	Contestant	Episode																							
Place	Contestant	1	2	3	4	5	6	7/8	9	10	11	12	13/14	15	16	17	18	19	20	21	22	23	24	25	26
1	Benjie	IN	WIN	IN	IN	IN	IN	WIN	HIGH	IN	WIN	WIN	WIN	IN	IN	IN	IN	IN	IN	IN	WIN	WIN	WIN	IN	WINNER
2	Candice	IN	IN	LOW	WIN	IN	IN	PT	IN	IN	LOW	HIGH	PT	IN	IN	WIN	IN	IN	WIN	WIN	IN	IN	IN	IN	RUNNER-UP
3	Simele	HIGH	IN	LOW	HIGH	IN	IN	WIN	IN	IN	IN	IN	WIN	IN	WIN	IN	LOW	WIN	LOW	IN	ELIM	RET	IN	ELIM	
4	Nkululeko	LOW	IN	LOW	LOW	LOW	IN	WIN	IN	WIN	HIGH	HIGH	WIN	IN	IN	IN	WIN	IN	IN	LOW	LOW	ELIM			
5	Jeshen	IN	IN	WIN	IN	WIN	IN	WIN	WIN	LOW	IN	HIGH	WIN	IN	IN	IN	IN	IN	IN	ELIM					
6	Shoki	IN	LOW	IN	IN	LOW	LOW	WIN	HIGH	IN	IN	HIGH	WIN	WIN	IN	IN	IN	ELIM							
7	Calvin	IN	LOW	IN	IN	IN	IN	WIN	IN	IN	IN	IN	PT	LOW	IN	ELIM									
8	Ntobeko	IN	IN	IN	HIGH	HIGH	HIGH	WIN	IN	IN	LOW	IN	WIN	IN	ELIM										
9	Keith	IN	IN	IN	IN	IN	LOW	HIGH	IN	HIGH	IN	IN	PT	ELIM											
10	Phil	IN	LOW	IN	IN	IN	HIGH	PT	HIGH	HIGH	HIGH	IN	ELIM												
11	Josh	IN	LOW	IN	LOW	LOW	IN	WIN	IN	IN	ELIM														
12	Lesego	HIGH	IN	LOW	IN	HIGH	LOW	PT	LOW	ELIM															
13	Mahlatse	IN	LOW	IN	LOW	HIGH	WIN	LOW	ELIM																
14	Karen	IN	IN	IN	IN	HIGH	IN	ELIM																	
15–16	Bandziva	IN	IN	IN	IN	ELIM																			
15–16	Myles	IN	IN	IN	IN	ELIM																			
17	Suhael	IN	IN	ELIM																					
18	Ali	WIN	ELIM																						
19–20	Chanelle	ELIM																							
19–20	Rejane	ELIM																							

(WINNER) This cook won the competition.
(RUNNER-UP) This cook received second place in the competition.
(WIN) The cook won the individual challenge (Mystery Box Challenge, Pressure Test or Invention Test).
(WIN) The cook was on the winning team in the Team Challenge and was safe from the Pressure Test.
(HIGH) The cook was one of the top entries in the Mystery Box Challenge, Pressure Test or Invention Test but didn't win.
(CC) The cook received the advantage of competing against a celebrity chef in this challenge. If they won, they advanced farther on in the competition, skipping a number of challenges. The cook could not be eliminated after this challenge.
(IMM) The cook won Immunity in the previous challenge and was safe from cooking.
(IN) The cook was not selected as a top entry or bottom entry in the challenge.
(PT) The cook was on the losing team in the Team Challenge, competed in the Pressure Test, and advanced.
(NPT) The cook was on the losing team in the Team Challenge, but did not compete in the Pressure Test.
(LOW) The cook was one of the bottom entries in an individual elimination challenge, but was not the last person to advance.
(RET) The cook returned to the competition.
(LOW) The cook was one of the bottom entries in an individual elimination challenge, and was the last person to advance.
(ELIM) The cook was eliminated from MasterChef.
