= Abhilash Tomy =

Indian naval officer and yachtsman

Commander Abhilash Tomy KC, NM
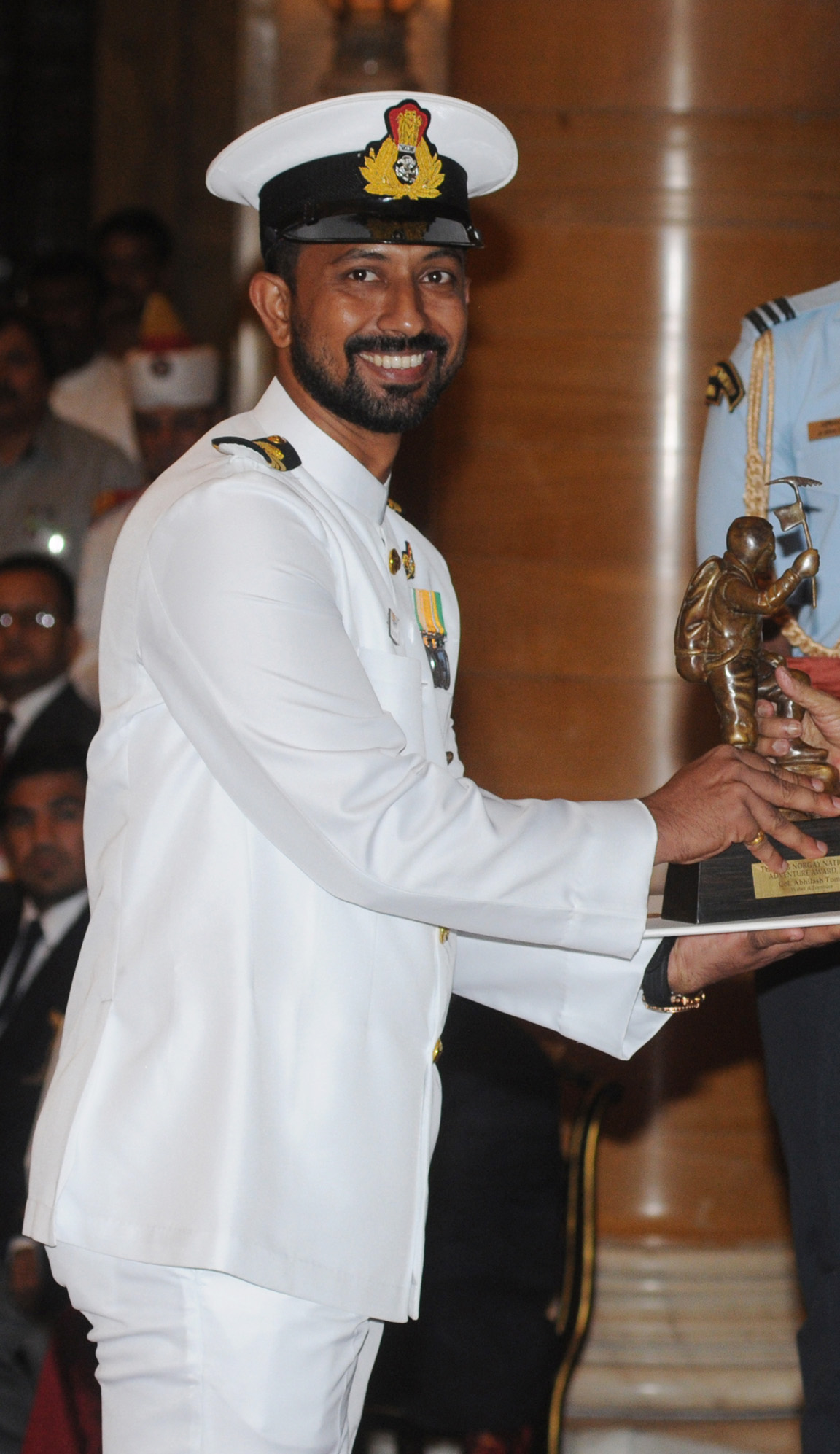
- Born: 5 February 1979 (age 47); Changanacherry, Kottayam, Kerala, India
- Allegiance: India
- Branch: Indian Navy
- Service years: 2000 – 2020
- Rank: Commander
- Awards: Kirti Chakra; Nausena Medal; MacGregor Medal; Tenzing Norgay National Adventure Award Doctor of Philosophy h.c.

Commander Abhilash Tomy, KC, NM (Retd) is a retired Indian Navy officer, naval aviator and yachtsman. In 2013, he became the first Indian to complete a solo, non-stop circumnavigation of the world under sail. He also competed in the 2018 Golden Globe Race. In January 2021, he retired from military service to concentrate on the 2022 Golden Globe Race. He finished second in the race, becoming the only Asian skipper to win a podium finish in a round the world race.

== Early life and education ==
Abhilash Tomy is one of the two sons born to Lieutenant commander V. C. Tomy, a former Naval Officer, and Valsamma. Abhilash Tomy was born in Chethipuzha Hospital, Changanacherry in Kerala. Abhilash has a brother Aneesh Tomy. Upon completing his schooling, he joined the Naval Academy in Goa, from where he was commissioned into the navy in the year 2000. He completed his flying training in 2002, qualifying as a maritime reconnaissance pilot on the Dornier 228.

== Sailing career ==
Prior to his solo circumnavigation of the globe (which was called Sagar Parikrama 2), Tomy had represented India in several international events including the 2011 Cape Town to Rio Race, Enterprise World Championships, Asian Sailing Championship etc.

In 2006, based on a proposal by Vice Admiral MP Awati, the navy authorised the construction of the INSV Mhadei, a sailboat, which was then sailed solo around the world by Cdr Dilip Donde in 2009-10, making four stops - Fremantle, Lyttelton, Port Stanley and Cape Town. This voyage was called the Sagar Parikrama, and Tomy was chosen as its shore support crew, helping Donde stock up supplies at the four ports.

Based on this experience, and his sailing expertise, he was chosen to helm Sagar Parikrama 2, a non-stop, unassisted circumnavigation of the globe, under sail. To prepare him for this role, in 2011, he and Cdr Dilip Donde participated in the Cape Town to Rio Race. On the return leg, Tomy sailed doubled handed from Rio to Cape Town and single handed from Cape Town to Goa. He also sailed to Malaysia and Thailand, with a crew of three.

On 1 November 2012, Tomy and the Mhadei departed from the Gateway of India at Mumbai. After completing a voyage of 23,100 nautical miles, he returned to Mumbai on 31 March 2013, having sailed around the Cape of Good Hope, Cape Horn and Cape Leeuwin. He became the only Indian, second Asian, and 79th person to accomplish this feat. A ceremonial reception was given by the President of India Shri Pranab Mukherjee at the Gateway of India on 6 April 2013.

=== 2018 Golden Globe Race ===
Abhilash was a special invitee and the only Asian entrant in the 2018 edition of the solo non-stop round-the-world Golden Globe Race. After 82 days, while in 3rd position, Abhilash's boat was damaged in a storm, and he suffered a severe injury to his spine. He was rescued after a multinational rescue effort.

=== 2022 Golden Globe Race ===
Abhilash took premature retirement from the Indian Navy in January 2021 to prepare for the 2022 Golden Globe Race. Due to back injuries sustained from his previous Golden Globe attempt, Abhilash took this journey with a titanium rod inserted in his spine. He finished second in the race and become the first Asian to do so. Abhilash's sailing commenced on 4 September 2022 from Les Sables-D'Olonne, France and finished on 29 April 2023 after sailing non-stop for 236 days.

== Personal life ==
Abhilash Tomy is married to Urmimala Nag from West Bengal. The couple has two sons, Vedaant and Abhraneil.

== Awards and decorations ==
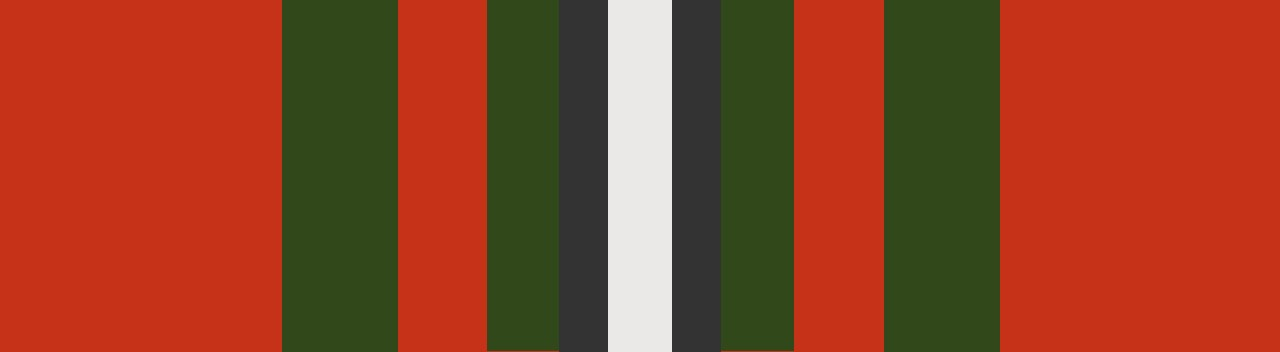

Kirti Chakra	Nausena Medal	Operation Vijay Star
Operation Parakram Medal	Sainya Seva Medal	Operation Vijay Medal
MacGregor Medal	50th Anniversary of Independence Medal	9 Years Long Service Medal

- Kirti Chakra – 2013 (Second officer in the navy to be awarded KC)
- Nau Sena Medal 2019
- YAI Offshore Sailor of the Year 2009, 2013, 2018
- Amrita TV Award for Outstanding Human Endurance and Courage – 2013
- Tenzing Norgay National Adventure Award -2012
- Only Indian in the International Association of Cape Horners
- Mac Gregor Medal for military reconnaissance – 2013
- CNS Commendation 2009
- National Maritime Foundation Award

=== Achievements ===
- Only Indian and 2nd Asian to sail solo, non stop, around the Earth
- Runner-up at the 2022 Golden Globe Race
- Shore support for Sagar Parikrama I (Navy’s first solo circumnavigation expedition)
- Yacht Services Manager of Volvo Ocean Race 2008 stopover at Kochi
- Podium finishes in Korea Cup 2014 and 2015
- Bronze medal in YAI Nationals 2015
- Author of "151 Solitary Days at Sea, Sailing Non-stop, Around the World", "Kadal Ottakku Kshanichappol" and "Journey to the Edge of the Earth"
- Council member of the Yachting Association of India
