= Abigail Mbalo-Mokoena =

South African chef and restaurateur

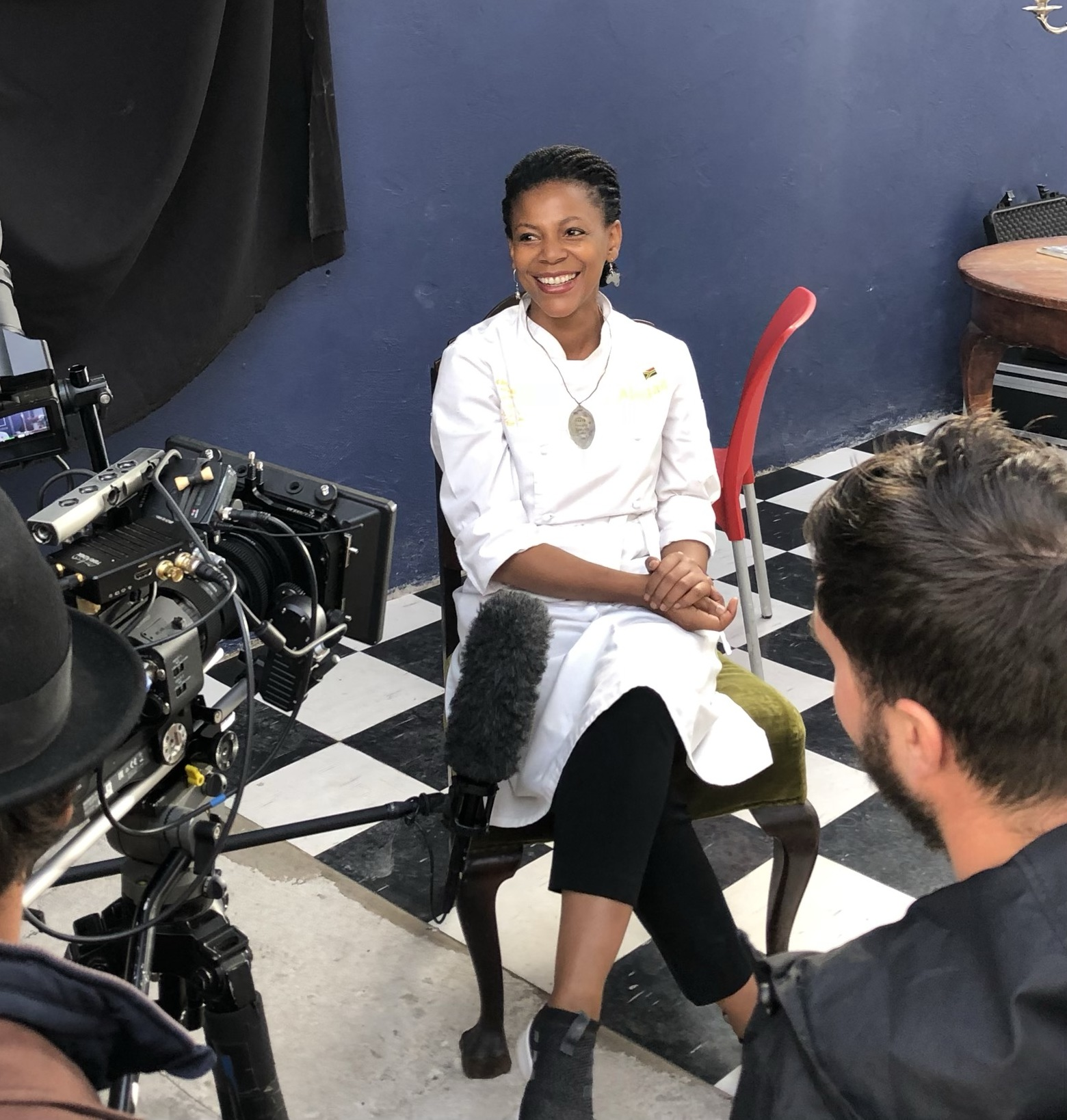
- Mbalo-Mokoena during media interviews
- Culinary career
- Cooking style: South African
- Current restaurant
- 4Roomed eKasi Culture
- Website: https://4roomedekasiculture.com

Abigail Mbalo-Mokoena is a South African chef and restaurateur. She is the chef, owner and creative director of 4Roomed, also called 4Roomed eKasi Culture or just eKasi, in Khayelitsha township, 30 kilometres (19 mi) outside Cape Town, South Africa. In 2019 4Roomed was named in a combined project by Food & Wine and Travel + Leisure magazines as one of the 30 best restaurants in the world.

== Early life ==
Mbalo-Mokoena born in Gugulethu and grew up in Khayelitsha. She worked as a dental technologist for 17 years before opening the restaurant and in 2014 was working at Cape Peninsula University of Technology’s Dental Sciences department.

== Culinary career ==
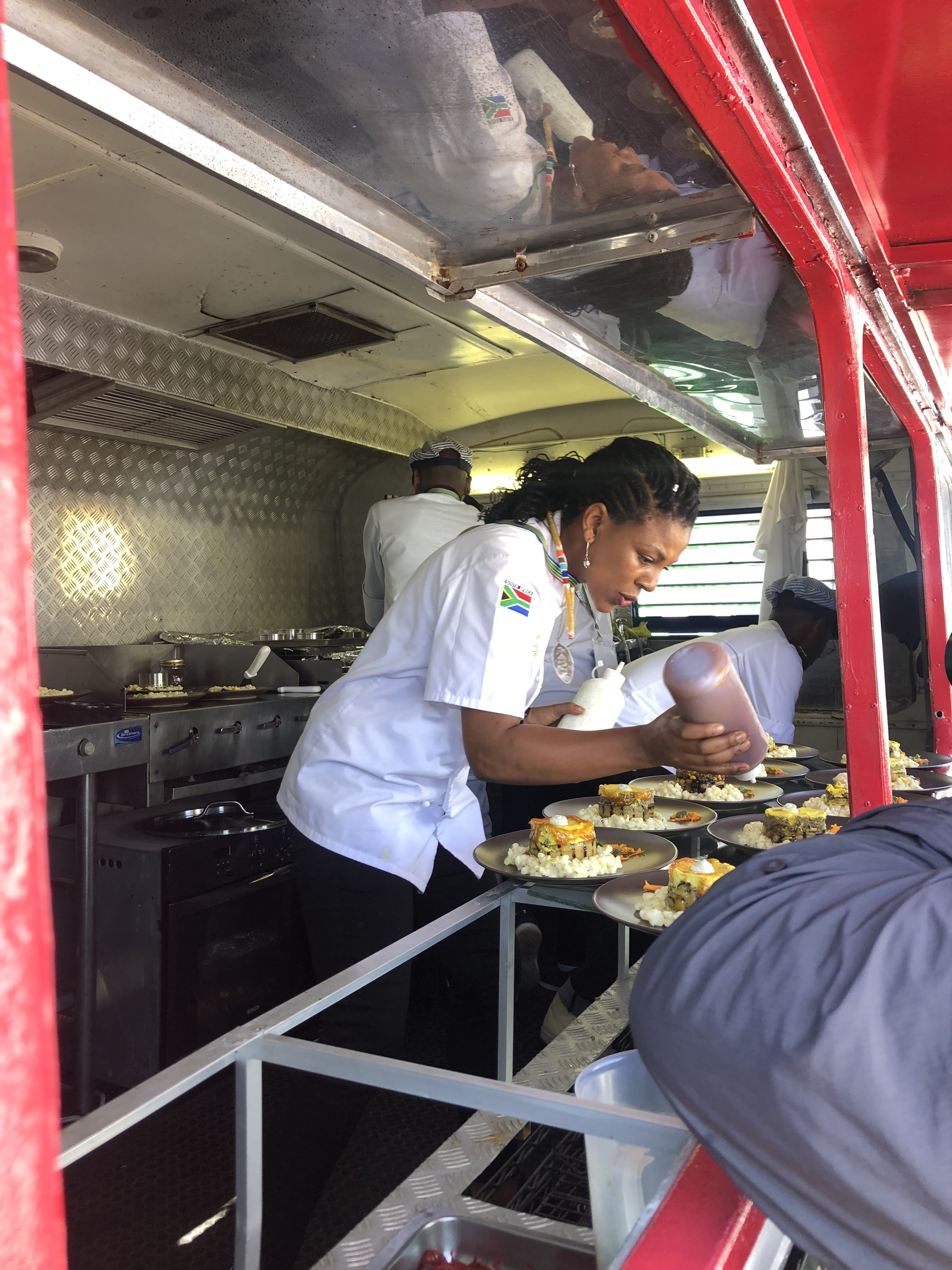
Mbalo-Mokoena in her food truck

Mbalo-Mokoena is self-taught. The restaurant opened in 2014 as a food truck parked next to a shisa nyama and three years later moved into a four-roomed house. The restaurant is named for the four-room, multi-family bungalow typical in South Africa's eKasi (townships). Mbalo-Mokoena was raised in this type of home. In the house where she grew up, "every room was a bedroom, the kitchen, the lounge."

The restaurant specializes in modern interpretations of traditional African dishes, and especially South African dishes. 4Roomed serves a five-course tasting menu at a single communal table. Customers are approximately 30% local residents and the remainder tourists. Saveur called it "backyard fine dining." The Sunday Times said it was "disrupting the South African food scene with its re-imagined township cuisine that challenges notions of what constitutes fine dining." Mbalo-Mokoena also has a casual restaurant and carryout a few blocks from 4Roomed.

In 2014 Mbalo-Mokoena competed on the third season of MasterChef South Africa, where she reached the top six. In 2019 4Roomed was named in a combined project by Food & Wine and Travel + Leisure magazines as one of the 30 best restaurants in the world. It is one of only three restaurants in Africa to make the list; the others are Johannesburg's Le Wine Chambre and The Ruined Garden in Fez, Morocco.

== Philosophy ==
Mbalo-Mokoena and her husband, who were living in the Cape Town suburb Melkbosstrand, moved back to Khayelitsha because they "realized that by moving out of the townships when we got our qualifications and our degrees, we were actually depriving the economy of the townships." They believed that when educated members of the community leave for the suburbs or urban centers, "the kids have no one to look up to."

She decided to open a restaurant because she felt that South Africa wasn't celebrating its own food heritage.

== Personal life ==
Mbalo-Mokoena trained as a dental technologist. She is married to Sam Mokoena. The couple have two sons and one daughter. She is of Xhosa heritage and her husband, South Sotho.
