= MasterChef South Africa season 4 =

MasterChef South Africa
- Season 4
- Judges: Zola Nene; Gregory Czarnecki; Justine Drake
- No. of contestants: 20
- Winner: Shawn Godfrey
- Runner-up: Andriëtte de la Harpe
- Location: V&A Waterfront, Cape Town
- No. of episodes: 20

Release
- Original network: M-Net
- Original release: 28 February – 31 March 2022

Season chronology
- ← Previous; Season 3 Next → Season 5

The fourth season of MasterChef South Africa was announced on 17 August 2021 and began airing on 28 February 2022 on M-Net (DStv channel 101) after a seven-year hiatus.

The new judges introduced for this season are Zola Nene, Gregory Czarnecki and Justine Drake. Filming was done through a new production company, Homebrew Films, at the Victoria & Alfred Waterfront in Cape Town, South Africa. It wrapped up in November 2021.

The finale aired on 31 March 2022, where Shawn Godfrey took the title of MasterChef South Africa 2022.

== Contestants ==
=== Top 20 ===
| Contestant | Age | Occupation | Hometown | Episode of Elimination | Place Finished |
|---|---|---|---|---|---|
| Shawn Godfrey | 34 | Commercial director and entrepreneur | Cape Town | Winner | 1st |
| Andriëtte de la Harpe | 33 | Entrepreneur | Cape Town | Runner-Up | 2nd |
| Tarryn de Kock | 28 | Senior researcher | Cape Town | Episode 20 | 3rd |
| Simphiwe "Sims" Kubeka | 25 | Software engineer | Midrand | Episode 18 | 4th |
| Charmaine Govender-Koen | 39 | Self-employed | Cape Town | Episode 17 | 5–6th |
| Tembisa Jordaan | 37 | Marine scientist and filmmaker | Durban | Episode 17 | 5–6th |
| Udhir "Dr Harri" Harrinarain | 28 | Dentist | Durban | Episode 16 | 7th |
| Silindokuhle "Sli" Moroke | 27 | Content creator | Johannesburg | Episode 14 | 8th |
| Luyanda Mafanya | 27 | Food blogger and private cook | Johannesburg | Episode 13 | 9th |
| Ontiretse "Onti" Molloyi | 32 | Digital marketing and communications specialist | Mahikeng | Episode 12 | 10th |
| Dedre "Didi" Stols | 30 | Art auctioneer | Langebaan | Episode 10 | 11th |
| Tasnim Jadwat | 36 | Businesswoman and corporate director | Boksburg | Episode 9 | 12th |
| James Ovendale | 19 | Former student | Cape Town | Episode 7 | 13th |
| Alicia Nicola | 32 | Advertising creative director | Cape Town | Episode 6 | 14th |
| Onezwa Mbola | 26 | Unemployed | Willowvale | Episode 5 | 15th |
| Masedi Mabe | 25 | Freelancer | Johannesburg | Episode 4 | 16th |
| Mohammed Haffejee | 26 | Accountant | Cape Town | Episode 2 | 17th |
| Lisa Kayster | 26 | Human resources consultant | Cape Town | Episode 1 | 18–20th |
| Matthew Arnott | 25 | Freelancer | Cape Town | Episode 1 | 18–20th |
| Sylvie Hurford | 49 | Marketing strategist and consultant | Cape Town | Episode 1 | 18–20th |

== Elimination Table ==
| Place | Contestant | Episode | | | | | | | | | | | | | | |
| Place | Contestant | 1 | 2 | 3/4 | 5 | 6 | 7 | 8/9 | 10 | 11/12 | 13 | 14 | 15/16 | 17 | 18 | 19/20 |
|---|---|---|---|---|---|---|---|---|---|---|---|---|---|---|---|---|
| 1 | Shawn | IN | IN | WIN | WIN | PT | IN | PT | LOW | PT | IN | WIN | IMM | IN | IN | WINNER |
| 2 | Andriëtte | LOW | IN | WIN | IN | PT | LOW | WIN | IN | IN | IMM | IN | WIN | IN | IN | RUNNER-UP |
| 3 | Tarryn | IN | IN | WIN | IN | PT | WIN | WIN | IN | IN | IMM | LOW | WIN | WIN | LOW | ELIM |
| 4 | Sims | IN | IN | PT | IN | PT | LOW | WIN | IN | PT | IN | LOW | WIN | IN | ELIM | |
| 6 | Charmaine | IN | WIN | PT | LOW | WIN | IMM | PT | IN | IN | IMM | IN | PT | ELIM | | |
| 6 | Tembisa | IN | IN | PT | WIN | WIN | IN | WIN | IN | PT | LOW | LOW | PT | ELIM | | |
| 7 | Dr Harri | WIN | IN | WIN | IN | PT | IN | WIN | LOW | IN | IN | WIN | ELIM | | | |
| 8 | Sli | IN | IN | PT | IN | WIN | IN | PT | IN | IN | IN | ELIM | | | | |
| 9 | Luyanda | IN | IN | WIN | IN | PT | IN | PT | IN | PT | ELIM | | | | | |
| 10 | Onti | IN | IN | PT | LOW | LOW | IN | WIN | IN | ELIM | | | | | | |
| 11 | Didi | WIN | IN | WIN | IN | LOW | IN | PT | ELIM | | | | | | | |
| 12 | Tasnim | IN | WIN | PT | IN | PT | IN | ELIM | | | | | | | | |
| 13 | James | IN | IN | PT | WIN | PT | ELIM | | | | | | | | | |
| 14 | Alicia | IN | WIN | WIN | IN | ELIM | | | | | | | | | | |
| 15 | Onezwa | IN | LOW | WIN | ELIM | | | | | | | | | | | |
| 16 | Masedi | LOW | LOW | ELIM | | | | | | | | | | | | |
| 17 | Mohammed | IN | ELIM | | | | | | | | | | | | | |
| 20 | Lisa | ELIM | | | | | | | | | | | | | | |
| 20 | Matthew | ELIM | | | | | | | | | | | | | | |
| 20 | Sylvie | ELIM | | | | | | | | | | | | | | |

(WINNER) This chef won the competition.
(RUNNER-UP) This chef received second place in the competition.
(WIN) The chef won the individual challenge (Mystery Box Challenge or Invention Test).
(WIN) The chef was on the winning team in the Team Challenge and was safe from the Pressure Test.
(HIGH) The chef was one of the top entries in the Mystery Box Challenge or Invention Test but didn't win.
(CC) The chef received the advantage of competing against a celebrity chef in this challenge. If they won, they advanced farther on in the competition, skipping a number of challenges. The chef could not be eliminated after this challenge.
(IMM) The chef won Immunity in the previous challenge and was safe from cooking.
(IN) The chef was not selected as a top entry or bottom entry in the challenge.
(PT) The chef was on the losing team in the Team Challenge, competed in the Pressure Test, and advanced.
(LOW) The chef was one of the bottom entries in an individual elimination challenge, but was not the last person to advance.
(LOW) The chef was one of the bottom entries in an individual elimination challenge, and was the last person to advance.
(ELIM) The chef was eliminated from MasterChef.

== Episodes ==
MasterChef South Africa Season 4 Episodes
| No. overall | No. in season | Title | Original release date |
|---|---|---|---|
| 66 | 1 | "MasterChef Returns!" | 28 February 2022 |
| 67 | 2 | "Judges On A Plate" | 1 March 2022 |
| 68 | 3 | "Fast Fine Dining" | 2 March 2022 |
| 69 | 4 | "Iconic Snacks" | 3 March 2022 |
| 70 | 5 | "Peaches and Cheese" | 7 March 2022 |
| 71 | 6 | "Dorah Sitole Tribute" | 8 March 2022 |
| 72 | 7 | "Chilli Challenge" | 9 March 2022 |
| 73 | 8 | "African Grains" | 10 March 2022 |
| 74 | 9 | "Mystery Hive" | 14 March 2022 |
| 75 | 10 | "Mother Of Pearl" | 15 March 2022 |
| 76 | 11 | "Humble Tomato" | 16 March 2022 |
| 77 | 12 | "Cake Challenge" | 17 March 2022 |
| 78 | 13 | "Heritage To Haute" | 21 March 2022 |
| 79 | 14 | "Bush Canapés" | 22 March 2022 |
| 80 | 15 | "Nose to Tail" | 23 March 2022 |
| 81 | 16 | "Hug On A Plate" | 24 March 2022 |
| 82 | 17 | "Vegan Mystery Box" | 28 March 2022 |
| 83 | 18 | "Waste To Wonderful" | 29 March 2022 |
| 84 | 19 | "Seven Colours" | 30 March 2022 |
| 85 | 20 | "Season Final" | 31 March 2022 |
