= MasterChef South Africa season 1 =

MasterChef South Africa
- Season 1
- Judges: Pete Goffe-Wood; Andrew Atkinson; Benny Masekwameng
- No. of contestants: 18
- Winner: Deena Naidoo
- Runner-up: Sue-Ann Allen
- No. of episodes: 19

Release
- Original network: M-Net
- Original release: 20 March – 14 July 2012

Season chronology
- Next → Season 2

The first season of the African reality television series MasterChef South Africa began on 20 March 2012 and aired on M-Net. The season judges were Pete Goffe-Wood, Andrew Atkinson and Benny Masekwameng.

== Contestants ==
=== Top 18 ===
Contestant	Age	Occupation	Hometown	Episode of Elimination	Place Finished
Deena Naidoo	45	IT Specialist	Durban	Winner	1st
Sue-Ann Allen	30	Lighting designer	Woodstock	Runner-up	2nd
Manisha Naidu	29	Housewife	Sandton	Episode 18	3rd
Sarel Loots†	42	Adventure camp owner	Sabie	Episode 17	4th
Lungile Nhlanhla	21	Fashion graduate	Durban	Episode 16	5th
Khaya Silingile	27	Marketing coordinator	Sandton	Episode 15	6th
Ilse Fourie	32	Model	Cape Town	Episode 14	7th
Thys Hattingh	29	Bookkeeper	Rustenburg	Episode 13	8th
Jade de Waal	21	Jazz music student	Gardens	Episode 12	9th
Samantha Nolan	41	Mom	Table View	Episode 10	10th
Guy Clark	30	Property broker	Cape Town	Episode 9	11th
Babalwa Baartman	18	Buyer for Poetry	Cape Town	Episode 8	12/13th
Brandon Law	22	IT Consultant	Edenvale	Episode 8	12/13th
Mmutsi Maseko	34	Mom	Johannesburg	Episode 7	14th
Lwazi Mngoma	26	Artist management entrepreneur	Johannesburg	Episode 6	15th
Berdina Schurink	35	Unemployed	Cape Town	Episode 5	16th
Charles Canning	40	Runs family panel-beating business	Table View	Episode 4	17/18th
Fortune Kangueehi	36	Ad accounts manager	Windhoek	Episode 4	17/18th

== Elimination table ==
Place	Contestant	Episode															
Place	Contestant	4	5	6	7	8	9	10	11	12	13	14	15	16	17	18	Finale
1	Deena	IN	NPT	WIN	WIN	PT	IN	IN	LOW	LOW	LOW	IN	LOW	WIN	WIN	HIGH	WINNER
2	Sue-Ann	IN	WIN	WIN	LOW	WIN	IN	WIN	IN	WIN	NPT	WIN	WIN	HIGH	LOW	WIN	RUNNER-UP
3	Manisha	WIN	LOW	IN	WIN	PT	IN	WIN	IN	IN	WIN	IN	WIN	LOW	HIGH	ELIM	
4	Sarel	IN	WIN	LOW	WIN	WIN	LOW	IN	IN	IN	NPT	WIN	LOW	HIGH	ELIM		
5	Lungile	IN	NPT	IN	PT	WIN	IN	IN	IN	IN	WIN	IN	WIN	ELIM			
6	Khaya	IN	NPT	IN	WIN	WIN	WIN	LOW	WIN	CC	WIN	LOW	ELIM				
7	Ilse	IN	WIN	IN	PT	PT	IN	IN	IN	IN	WIN	ELIM					
8	Thys	IN	WIN	IN	PT	WIN	WIN	IN	LOW	LOW	ELIM						
9	Jade	IN	NPT	IN	WIN	LOW	LOW	LOW	LOW	ELIM							
10	Samantha	WIN	WIN	IN	WIN	WIN	LOW	ELIM									
11	Guy	IN	WIN	IN	PT	PT	ELIM										
12	Babalwa	IN	WIN	IN	PT	ELIM											
12	Brandon	IN	WIN	IN	WIN	ELIM											
14	Mmutsi	LOW	PT	IN	ELIM												
15	Lwazi	LOW	PT	ELIM													
16	Berdina	LOW	ELIM														
17	Charles	ELIM															
17	Fortune	ELIM															

(WINNER) This chef won the competition.
(RUNNER-UP) This chef received second place in the competition.
(WIN) The chef won the individual challenge (Mystery Box Challenge or Invention Test) and but didn't win.
(HIGH) The cook was one of the top entries in the (Mystery Box Challenge or Invention Test) but didn't win.
(WIN) The chef was on the winning team in the Team Challenge and was safe from the Pressure Test.
(CC) The chef received the advantage of competing against a celebrity chef in this challenge. If they won, they advanced farther on in the competition, skipping a number of challenges. The chef could not be eliminated after this challenge.
(IN) The chef was not selected as a top entry or bottom entry in the challenge.
(PT) The chef was on the losing team in the Team Challenge (except episode 8 – an Individual Challenge), competed in the pressure test, and advanced.
(LOW) The chef was one of the bottom entries in an individual elimination challenge, but was not the last person to advance.
(LOW) The chef was one of the bottom entries in an individual elimination challenge, and was the last person to advance.
(ELIM) The chef was eliminated from MasterChef.

== Episodes ==
Ep# / Show-Ep#	Original Airdate	Episodes	Total viewers (million)
1	20 March 2012	Auditions Part 1	998,664
2	27 March 2012	Auditions Part 2	993,662
