= MasterChef South Africa =

South African reality television series

- Judges: Andrew Atkinson; Benny Masekwameng; Pete Goffe-Wood; Reuben Riffel; Gregory Czarnecki; Justine Drake; Zola Nene; Katlego Mlambo
- Country of origin: South Africa
- Original language: English
- No. of seasons: 5
- No. of episodes: 85

Production
- Running time: 60 minutes
- Production companies: Homebrew Films; Quizzical Pictures; Lucky Bean Media

Original release
- Network: M-Net, SABC 3
- Release: 20 March 2012 – present

MasterChef South Africa is the South African version of the television cooking game show franchise MasterChef. It was originally filmed on the Nederburg Wine Estate in Paarl, Western Cape and judged by Pete Goffe-Wood, Benny Masekwameng, Reuben Riffel and Andrew Atkinson, up to the third season. The series' first run was from March 2012 – May 2015.

On 17 August 2021, M-Net announced that the show would be back for a fourth season in 2022, which kicked off on 28 February 2022. Filming was done at the V&A Waterfront in Cape Town, Western Cape with a new production company and new judges.

On 17 January 2024, MasterChef South Africa was renewed for a fifth season, announcing that the show would air on SABC 3. The fifth season began airing in July 2024 and concluded on 23 November.

== Format ==
=== Preliminaries ===
Of all the amateur chefs who audition nationwide, one hundred are chosen to cook their signature dish for the three judges. Each judge takes a taste of the dish and gives his opinion before voting a "yes" or a "no". At least two "yes" votes are required to earn a white MasterChef apron, allowing the competitor to advance.

=== Mystery Box challenge ===
In the Mystery Box challenge, contestants receive a number of ingredients of which they are to make a dish of their choice. The contestants have to use all the ingredients in the box. Once the dishes are finished, the judges taste all the dishes. The winner receives an advantage in the following elimination challenge.

=== Off-site team challenge ===
The off-site team challenge involves the contestants being split into two teams, blue and red, which consist of equal numbers and are given a task, for example, running a restaurant or catering for a party or wedding (similar to Gordon Ramsay's other series, Hell's Kitchen). After the task has been completed, the teams are given the results, which can be determined by third party votes. Members of the losing team compete in an elimination challenge.

=== Pressure test ===
A "pressure test" challenge involves competitors who failed in a previous challenge (i.e. the three worst performers in an individual challenge or the losing team in a group challenge). The competitors are given a dish that they then must create in a particular time frame. Once the contestants have finished cooking, the dishes are taken to the judges to be tasted, who then criticize, vote and eliminate one or more contestants.

== Seasons ==
Season	Original run	Winner	Runner-up	Third place	No. of Finalists
1	20 March – 14 July 2012	Deena Naidoo	Sue-Ann Allen	Manisha Naidu	18
2	11 June – 11 September 2013	Kamini Pather	Leandri van der Wat	Seline van der Wat	16
3	21 August – 11 December 2014	Roxi Wardman	Siphokazi Mdlankomo	Phillipa Robinson	12
Celebrity 1	8 February – 10 May 2015	Chris Forrest	Patricia Lewis	Terence Bridgett	10
4	28 February 2022 – 31 March 2022	Shawn Godfrey	Andriëtte de la Harpe	Tarryn de Kock	20
5	13 July 2024 – 23 November 2024	Bridget Mangwandi	Nabila Shamshum	Chanel Brink	20
Celebrity 2	30 November 2024 – 4 January 2025	Seth Shezi	Dineo Ranaka	Holly Rey & Mzukisi Mbane	12
6	22 February 2026 – present	TBA	TBA	TBA	20

=== Season 1 (2012) ===
The first season aired in March 2012, ending with Deena Naidoo as the winner and Sue-Ann Allen as runner-up.

=== Season 2 (2013) ===
The second season aired in June 2013, ending with Kamini Pather as the winner and Leandri van der Wat as runner-up, while her sister Seline came third.

=== Season 3 (2014) ===
The third season of MasterChef South Africa aired its first episode on 21 August 2014. Abigail Mbalo-Mokoena was among the competitors.

=== Celebrity Season 1 (2015) ===
Celebrity MasterChef South Africa season 1 aired its first episode on 8 February 2015. It was won by Chris Forrest, while Patricia Lewis was the runner up.

=== Season 4 (2022) ===
The fourth season of MasterChef South Africa was announced on 17 August 2021 and began airing on M-Net on 28 February 2022 with 20 contestants. Shawn Godfrey took the winner title leaving Andriëtte de le Harpe as the runner-up.

=== Season 5 (2024) ===
On 17 January 2024, MasterChef South Africa was renewed for a fifth season in a new home on SABC 3. The fifth season premiered on 13 July 2024. The season was won by Bridget Mangwandi, while Nabila "Bealah" Shamshum was the runner-up.

=== Celebrity Season 2 (2024–2025) ===
On 26 November 2024, Celebrity MasterChef South Africa was renewed for a second season and aired on SABC 3 on 30 November 2024. It was won by Seth Shezi, while Dineo Ranaka was the runner-up.

=== Season 6 (2026) ===
On 22 February 2026, MasterChef South Africa season 6 premiered on e.tv with 20 contestants.
