= Dilip Donde =

Indian Naval officer (born 1967)

Capt Dilip Donde (Retd)
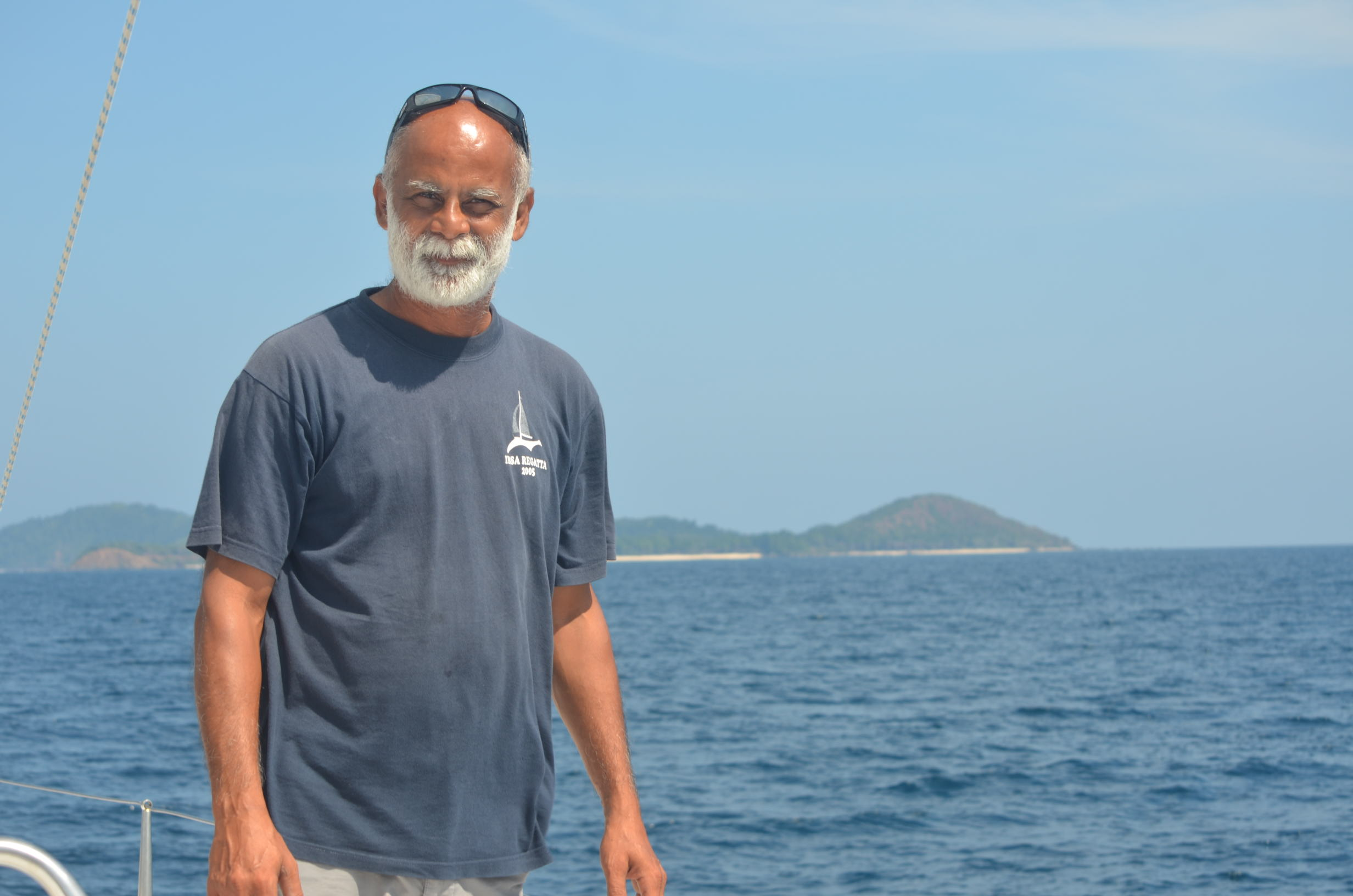
- Born: 26 September 1967 (age 59)
- Military career
- Branch: Indian Navy / Clearance Diver
- Rank: Captain
- Awards: Shaurya Chakra; Tenzing Norgay National Adventure Award; MacGregor Medal; Maritime Achievement Award
- Website: thefirstindian.com

Captain Dilip Donde (born 26 September 1967) is a retired Indian Naval officer and the first Indian to complete a solo, unassisted circumnavigation of the globe under sail. If one checks the requirements of a circumnavigation of the globe under sail he is the first Indian to circumnavigate the globe. From April 2006 to May 2010 he planned and executed Project 'Sagar Parikrama' which involved constructing a sailboat in India and then sailing it around the world. He was the hundred and ninetieth person to complete the journey solo.

== Sagar Parikrama ==
The voyage was the first of the Indian Navy's project Sagar Parikrama, initiated by late Vice-Admiral Manohar Prahlad Awati (Retd). Capt. Donde started his circumnavigation from Mumbai on 19 August 2009 and finished on 19 May 2010. During the nine-month-long circumnavigation he stopped at four ports and was at sea for 157 days. Donde volunteered to undertake the project for the Indian Navy in 2006. Over the next four years he built a boat with an Indian boat-builder, trained himself and sailed solo around the world with four stops en route.

== The vessel ==
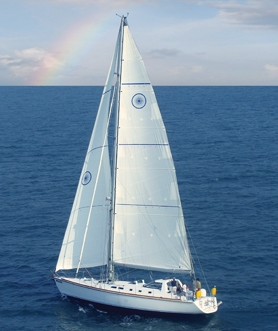
INSV Mhadei

The boat used in his circumnavigation as part of the Sagar Parikrama project was the Indian Navy Sailing Vessel INSV Mhadei, custom built by the Indian Navy. The 56-foot Van de Stadt 'Tonga' design sloop was built as a wood core epoxy construction by Mr Ratnakar Dandekar at his boat yard Aquarius Shipyard Pvt Ltd on Divar island in Goa by Ratnakar Dandekar. The boat was handed over to the Indian Navy on 12 February 2009 and named after the river Mhadei, the original name of the Mandovi River in Goa.

== Solo circumnavigation ==
The requirements to qualify for solo circumnavigation include:

- Starting and finishing in the same Port
- Not passing through any Canals or Straits that would necessitate outside assistance or motoring
- Crossing all meridians at least once
- Crossing the Equator at least twice
- Traversing at least 21,600 NM
- Rounding the three great capes viz Cape Leeuwin, Cape Horn and Cape of Good Hope

Donde recounts his story in his book, The First Indian: Story of the First Indian Solo Circumnavigation Under Sail. He left Mumbai from the Naval Dockyard on 19 August 2009 at 16:30 after being flagged off by Chief of Naval Staff, Admiral Sureesh Mehta. He crossed, from West to East, the Indian, Pacific, Southern and Atlantic Oceans, covering over 23,000 nautical miles, rounding Cape Leeuwin in Australia, Cape Horn in South America and Cape of Good Hope in Africa. The journey took 273 days and was completed on 19 May 2010.

On 22 May 2010, he was given a ceremonial welcome in Mumbai by the then Vice President of India, Mohd Hamid Ansari. Ansari stated, "Donde has shown that skill, determination and courage can achieve what is considered to be immensely difficult, if not impossible.". Dilip Donde became the first Indian to complete such a journey.

== Mentor ==
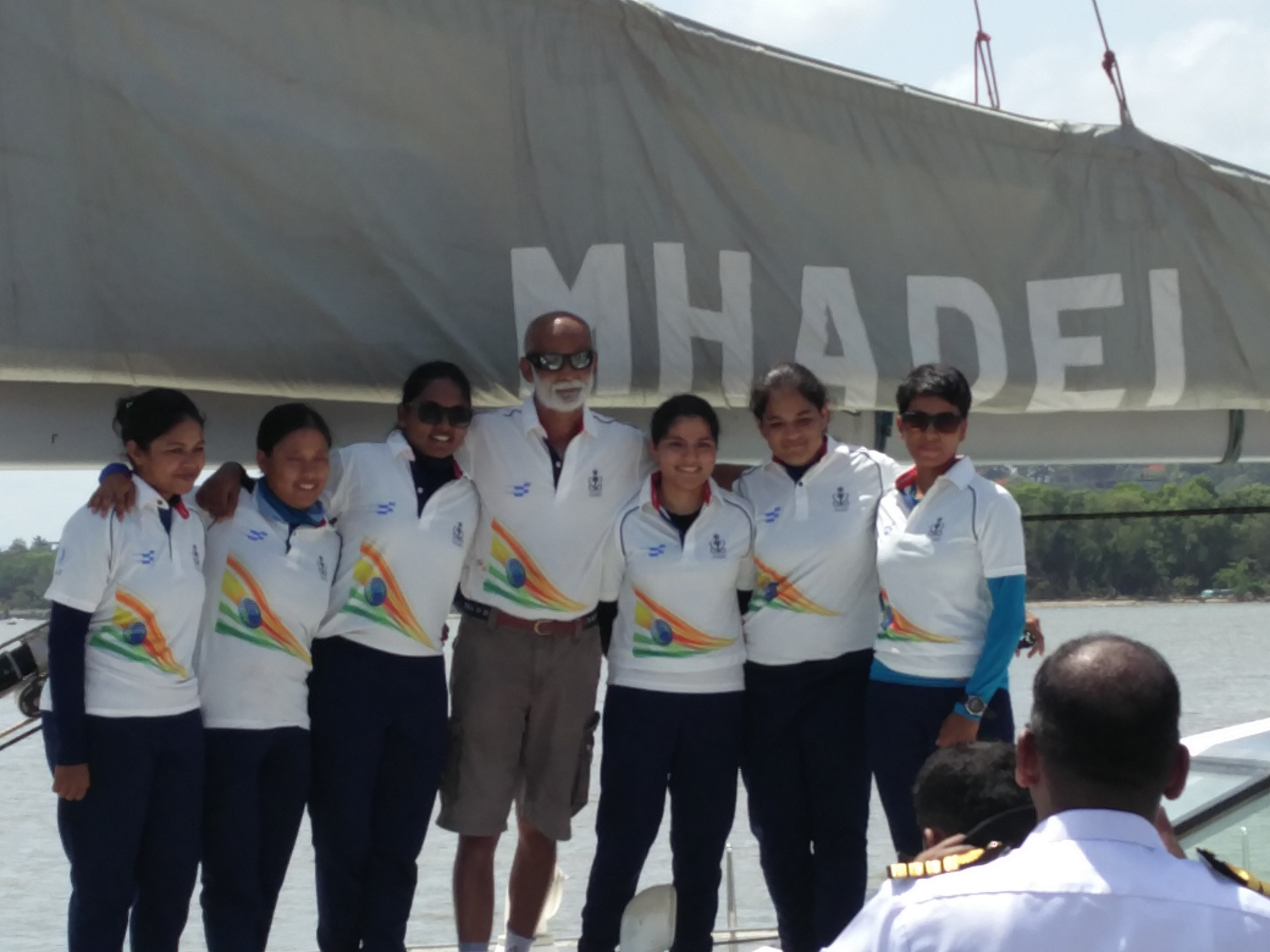
Dilip Donde with the Navika Sagar Parikrama Team

Dilip Donde mentored Lt Cdr Abhilash Tomy and headed the shore support team to plan and execute Sagar Parikrama 2, the first solo nonstop circumnavigation by an Indian. He subsequently trained several young naval officers, most recently the all women naval officers team that completed Navika Sagar Parikrama.

== Other sailing accomplishments ==
- In August 2018, sailed with Sir Robin Knox-Johnston to the Arctic as crew on his Farr 56 sailboat.
- In June 2018, sailed with Knox-Johnston on his Suhaili to attend the start of the Golden Globe Race 2018 at Les Sables d’Olone, France.
- Crewed for a Volvo Open 70, Warrior, in March 2017, sailing across the Atlantic from Valencia, Spain to Antigua, West Indies.
- Sailed INSV Mhadei from Goa to Visakhapatnam to participate in The International Fleet Review 2016 while training India's first all women ocean sailing team.
- Participated in the Transatlantic Race 2015 from Newport, RI, USA to Cowes, UK. Launched in 1866, this is the world's oldest trans-oceanic yacht race.
- Sailed in the North Atlantic from Grenada to Newport, RI, USA in May 2015 with Knox-Johnston on his Open 60 boat Grey Power.
- Sailed around the Indian peninsula and the Andamans training a group of novice crew members including four women officers. The voyage, between November 2014 and January 2015 marked the completion of 100,000 nm of sailing in six years for the boat INSV Mhadei
- Skippered INSV Mhadei in the Cape to Rio Race, 2014 and 2011
- Sailed from France to UK in Nov 2012, with Knox Johnston, on his Bombay-built boat, Suhaili.
- Volunteer shore support for Sir Robin's campaign to sail solo around the world as part of the Velux 5 Oceans Race in Sep 2006
- Executive officer (First mate) of INS Tarangini during her maiden voyage around the world. Sailed in the North Atlantic, the Great Lakes and participated in Tall Ship Races organized by the American Sail Training Association, between May and Oct 2003.

== Recognition ==
Dilip Donde is the recipient of several awards including:

- The Shaurya Chakra, third highest peacetime gallantry award in India
- The Tenzing Norgay National Adventure Award
- MacGregor Medal, awarded by the United Services Institute of India for valuable military reconnaissance and adventure.
- Maritime Achievement Award, instituted by The National Maritime Foundation for significant contribution in the maritime field.
