= South Atlantic Race =

Yacht race from Cape Town to various destinations in South America

The South Atlantic Race (formerly the Cape-to-Rio) is a yacht race from Cape Town to various destinations in South America. This has been primarily Rio de Janeiro, Brazil, although Punta del Este, Uruguay, and Salvador, Brazil, have all been chosen.

== History ==
Following the success of Bruce Dalling and the yacht Voortrekker in the 1968 Single-Handed Trans-Atlantic Race, Admiral Hugo Biermann, then chairman of the Springbok Ocean Racing Trust, suggested that South Africa host an ocean race of its own.

The South African Ocean Racing Trust (as the SAORT became known) selected the Iate Clube do Rio de Janeiro, who were willing to co-operate in the organising of the race and the race would be known as the Cape to Rio. The first race was organised for 1971, with the organisers anticipating at most 15 entries into the race. However the race attracted a large amount of interest and 58 boats entered the 1971 race.

Ocean Spirit won the first race on 8 February, after 23 days and 42 minutes.

The 11th race was held to Salvador in 2006. The 2009 race was held to Bahia.

The 12th edition was back to the original course, Cape to Rio, and was won on handicap by Gerry Hegie on the yacht City of Cape Town in 17 days, 12 minutes.

The 75 ft Zephyrus IV holds the record for the race to Salvador, at 12 days, 16 hours, 49 minutes and 41 seconds.

The VOR70 Maserati of Giovanni Soldini set a new record for the race original course (Cape to Rio) in the 2014 race at 10 days, 11 hours, 29 minutes and 57 seconds This was however significantly improved in the 2020 race, when the trimaran LoveWater, sponsored by JSE listed HomeChoice International Ltd and skippered by Capetonian Craig Sutherland, took line honors in 7 days, 20 hours, 24 minutes and 44 seconds. The crew was made up of six South Africans, a Frenchman and a Briton.

== The race ==
This race is the longest continent-to-continent yacht race in the southern hemisphere.

The total length of the race is around 5,800 kilometres (3,600 mi) across the Atlantic Ocean. After leaving Cape Town, participants head north-west towards the island of Ilha Trindade, and south-west from there towards South America. As they near the coast, skippers need to decide whether to take the longer route with stronger winds, or a more direct route with the chance for lighter winds.

Prizes are awarded to the first competitor across the line, new records being set, as well as the first three across the line in three handicap classes.
