= Flag off =

Flag Off or Flagged Off means official start or beginning of an event or undertaking. In this a piece of cloth, usually rectangular in size, and of distinctive color and design, is used as a symbol, standard, signal, or emblem and waved.

It is an idiomatic expression, indicating the commencement of some event- usually involving travel or movement. Such an event is either an expedition, a race, or a rally. Mostly it is a checkered flag of black and white or a flag of single color (any color) with or without emblem or signage of the event printed on it. As a ceremonial beginning often involves waving of a flag by a dignitary to signify the formal commencement of an event, it's called flag off. In naval or maritime context, a maritime flag or a naval ensign may be waved to signify the start of an expedition. On the other hand, for stationary events, such as a sporting tournament, political summit, literary meet, etc. the equivalent expression used is kick-off.

== Significance ==
Even though the word 'Off' often stands for a negative meaning, 'Flag off' is used to mean that somebody gave the orders to start something like a 'race'. One of the most famous flag off was at the Formula 1 competition, when the first world championship race was held at Silverstone race track in England on May 13, 1950. A similar significant flag off event happened when the then Railway Minister Mamata Banerjee flagged off India's first ever point-to-point non-stop train, the Sealdah-New Delhi Duronto Express, from the Sealdah station in Kolkata on January 20, 2013. The 1st ever ‘SBI Green Marathon’, an SBI initiative to promote sustainability was flagged off from Delhi on March 25, 2018.
