= Kamini Pather =

South African chef

- Born: 20 April 1983 (age 43); Mobeni Heights, Durban, South Africa
- Education: University of KwaZulu-Natal
- Culinary career
- Television shows: MasterChef South Africa; Girl Eat World
- Website: likeharmony.co.za

Kamini Pather (born 20 April 1983) is a South African chef, food blogger, and television and radio personality. She won the second season of MasterChef South Africa in 2013 and hosted the food travel series Girl Eat World.

== Early life and education ==
A fifth-generation South African of South Indian origin, Pather was born in Mobeni Heights, a suburb of Durban to parents Rajen and Anitha and grew up in Glenwood. She has a younger brother, Neelan. She attended Durban Girls' College and went on to graduate with a Bachelor of Commerce in Marketing and Management from the University of KwaZulu-Natal. She holds a diploma from the Red and Yellow Creative School of Business and has a qualification in yoga.

== Career ==
After writing for Aficionado, Pather started her own food blog, then titled Deelishuss, in 2008. In 2012, she worked for the online food magazine CRUSH and in 2013, worked as a food assistant for Siba Mtongana. Pather's radio gigs have included 2oceansvibe Radio, Good Hope FM, and Heart 104.9 FM.

Pather won the second season of MasterChef South Africa in 2013.

Pather hosted and produced the food travel series Girl Eat World with Lucky Bean Media. Filming for the series took place in 2014 over the course of 9 weeks, taking place in 10 difference cities around the world and involving said cities' local food bloggers. It premiered on SABC 3 in May 2015. It was also broadcast in other countries. The series won a 2016 SAFTA for Best Magazine Show.

She ran the 2016 Cape Town Marathon. She appeared as a guest judge on Top Chef South Africa.

In 2017, Pather released a kitchenware line, Kitchen Kulture. In 2018, she collaborated with South African meal kit service UCOOK and went on to launch Füdy, her own plant-based dark kitchen via UberEats SA.

Pather released Eat Glocal, an e-book on Indian South African cooking, in January 2021.

== Bibliography ==
- Eat Glocal (2021)
- All Dhal'd Up (2025)
