= Wellington On a Plate =

Annual food festival in Wellington, NZ

Wellington On a Plate is an annual food festival run by the Wellington Culinary Events Trust (WCET), a profitable trust in Wellington's hospitality industry during the winter low-season. The first Wellington On a Plate festival was held in August 2009. Visa has been a naming rights sponsor of the festival since 2010, and the festival is known as 'Visa Wellington On a Plate'.

The festival consists of various events and special festival-only dishes, cocktails and burgers. The festival showcases local chefs and producers attracting visitors from New Zealand and around the world. Economic studies have shown the festival contributes $30m NZD to Wellington's local economy each year.

Wellington On a Plate is one of the largest food festivals in the Southern hemisphere based on consumer participation across all platforms. Typically more than 250 hospitality venues take part in Wellington On a Plate each year. There is a different theme each year which sets the tone for the festival.The best of the festival are recognised at annual awards in August.

Traditionally Wellington On a Plate has been held in August, however in 2023 the festival was split into two editions every year in May and August. The May edition of Wellington On a Plate presented festival events, Dine Wellington and Cocktail Wellington. The August edition included Burger Wellington and Beervana, a craft-beer festival that attracts around 16,000 people each year. Local craft brewery Garage Project has been a sponsor of Burger Wellington since 2013.

In 2024 Wellington On a Plate will be held from 1–31 August, with Burger Wellington from 5–25 August.

== History ==
The festival began in 2009 with 35 participants. In 2022 there were more than 250 venues participating from across the Wellington region. Since 2009 there have been more than 87,500 Festival events tickets sold and 1500 festival events held across Wellington.

The Burger Wellington challenge first started in 2010. From 2013 Wellington Craft Beer Brewery Garage Project became a major partner of Burger Wellington, with the name changing to Garage Project presents Burger Wellington.

In the past the festival has included Dine Wellington, and Cocktail Wellington. Dine Wellington challenges local chefs to create a dish that showcases local produce and serves 'Wellington On a Plate' that relates to the festival theme. Cocktail Wellington challenges local bartenders to create a cocktail that also embodies the festival theme for the year.

International chef and food personality collaborations over the years include: Alla Wolf-Tasker, Melbourne, Australia; Analiese Gregory, Hobart, Tasmania; Anna Hansen, London, UK; Ash Heeger, Birmingham, United Kingdom; Ben Shewry, Melbourne, Australia; Bob Piechznick, Melbourne, Australia; Chef Wan, Kuala Lumpur, Malaysia; Cheong Liew, Adelaide, Australia; Dan Hong, Sydney, Australia; Dean Brettschneider, Singapore; Frank Camorra, Melbourne, Australia; James Knappett, London, UK; Jp McMahon, Galway, Ireland; Karen Martini, Melbourne, Australia; Keigo Tamura, Kyoto, Japan; Kenny Trinh, Adelaide, Australia; Kim Wejendorp, Copenhagen, Denmark; Kristen Kish, Austin, USA; Lucho Martinez, Mexico City, Mexico; Maggie Beer, Adelaide, Australia; Margot Henderson, London, UK; Mark Best, Sydney, Australia; May Chow, Hong Kong; Morgan McGlone, Sydney, Australia; Nancy Silverton, Los Angeles, USA; Nyesha Arrington, Los Angeles, USA; Prateek Sadhu, Kashmir, India; Ravinder Bhogal, London, UK; Ron Finley, Los Angeles, USA; Sara Kramer, Los Angeles, USA; Sean Connolly, Sydney, Australia

Chef collaborations from across New Zealand include: Al Brown, Auckland; Andrea Marseglia, Hawke's Bay; Casey McDonald, Hawke's Bay; Desmond Harris, Auckland; Graham Brown, Christchurch; Jason Kim, Auckland; Johnny Schwass, Christchurch; Josh Emett, Auckland; Julie Le Clerc, Auckland; Josh Hunter, Christchurch, Michael Meredith, Auckland; Lauraine Jacobs, Auckland; Nadia Lim, Queenstown; Peter Gordon, Auckland; Ruth Pretty, Kāpiti; Vaughan Mabee, Queenstown; Jack Cashmore, Central North Island; Giulia Sturla, Christchurch; Carlo Buenaventura, Auckland; Otis Shapiro, Auckland; Kasey and Kārena Bird, Maketu.

== The 2023 festival - 'Breaking the Mould' ==
The May Edition ran from 5–21 May, and offered just over 100 events and pop ups, 70 Dine Wellington and 70 Cocktail Wellington entries. Diners submitted 5000 ratings to help determine the May Edition finalists. The August Edition of Visa Wellington On a Plate ran from 11–27 August, and had 200-plus burger entries, as well as burger and beer-related events. Diners submitted 11,500 ratings to help determine the 2023 Burger Wellington presented by Garage Project finalists.

DINE WELLINGTON AWARDS 2023

- Winner: Would You Could You Wasabi Pie from Neo Café & Eatery
- Second place: Absolutely Avo-licious from Zelati Dessert Cafe
- Third place: Sharing is Caring from Damascus

COCKTAIL WELLINGTON AWARDS 2023

- Winner: Blue Gold from Pravda Café & Grill
- Second place: La Nouvelle Façon from Oak & Vine Restaurant
- Third place: Wrecking Ball from The Lobby Lounge

MOST INNOVATIVE AWARDS - MAY EDITION 2023

- Dine: Absolutely Avo-licious from Zelati Dessert Cafe
- Cocktail: La Nouvelle Façon from Oak & Vine Restaurant
- Event: Abstraction by Graze x Teresa

BEST USE OF THEME AWARDS - MAY EDITION 2023

- Dine: Queer Eye for the Fungi from Hippopotamus
- Cocktail: Blue Gold from Pravda Café & Grill
- Event: ORIENTable by Capitol x KC Cafe

THE 2023 BURGER WELLINGTON PRESENTED BY GARAGE PROJECT WINNERS ARE:

- One80’s Goan Chicken Ros Pao - Burger Wellington presented by Garage Project Winner
- Field & Green’s Reuben-esque - 2nd place in Burger Wellington presented by Garage Project
- Ernesto’s Cocina Cubana - 3rd place in Burger Wellington presented by Garage Project
- Elixir’s The Phial Of Eären-Dill - Best Use of Theme
- Myrtle’s Belly and Jelly - Most Innovative
- Regional Award winners are:
  - Wairarapa - Café Medici’s A Perfect Swine
  - Upper Hutt - Boneface Brewing Co’s Yorkie Dork
  - Hutt City - Twenty Eight’s Spice is Right
  - Porirua - T Bay Cafe’s The Hot Chick
  - Kāpiti - Hey Coastie’s Coast with the Most

== The 2022 festival - 'State of Flux' ==
The theme for 2022 was 'State of Flux'. That year more 12,000 foodies rated 70 different Dine Wellington dishes, explored 80 different drinks as part of Cocktail Wellington, and visited 200 hospitality venues participating in Burger Wellington during the Wellington On a Plate festival. Typically 250,000 burgers are sold through the festival each year.

Two new awards were introduced to the festival in 2022:

- The Next Gen Cook Off at Everybody Eats which saw five young chefs compete weekly and cook meals for the charity organisation with a restaurant located in Wellington’s CBD. The initiative raised more than $18,000.
- The Lumina Lamb Rising Stars Awards recognise emerging hospitality talent, and nominations are put forward from Wellington’s venues.

== Past Festival Award Winners ==
Each year festival participants are given awards. Categories include Burger Wellington, Dine Wellington and Cocktail Wellington. Past winners are listed below.

=== Burger Wellington: Best Burger ===
- 2023: One80
- 2022: Chaat Street
- 2021: Egmont St Eatery
- 2019: Cafe Medici
- 2018: Wilson Barbecue
- 2017: Mr Go's
- 2016: Apache
- 2015: Egmont St. Eatery
- 2014: Charley Noble
- 2013: Ti Kouka
- 2012: Boulcott Street Bistro
- 2011: Café Polo
- 2010: Lembas Café

=== Dine Wellington: Best Festival Dish ===
- 2023: Neo Café
- 2022: Neo Café
- 2021: Boulcott Street Bistro
- 2019: Grace Patisserie
- 2018: Field & Green
- 2017: Ortega Fish Shack & Bar
- 2016: Jano Bistro
- 2015: Logan Brown
- 2014: The White House

=== Cocktail Wellington: Best Cocktail ===
- 2023: Pravda
- 2022: Boulcott Street Bistro
- 2021: C.G.R Merchant & Co.
- 2019: Pravda
- 2018: C.G.R Merchant & Co.
- 2017: CoCo at The Roxy
- 2016: CoCo at The Roxy
- 2015: CoCo at The Roxy

== Recognition ==
- World Culinary Awards 2022 - Oceania's Best Culinary Festival
- Metro Magazine 2022 Best Of Wellington – Best Event
- Felix Awards 2020 – Outstanding Innovation of the Year for At Yours by Visa Wellington On a Plate
- LGNZ EXCELLENCE Awards 2019 – Creative New Zealand EXCELLENCE Award for Cultural Well-being (with Wellington City Council)
- NZEA Event Awards 2019 – Best Sponsorship 2018
- Wellington Gold Awards 2018 – Vibrant Gold
- New Zealand Association of Event Professionals Awards 2014 – Best Partnership for an Event and Best Established Regional Event
