= Thornbury Castle =

Tudor castle in Thornbury, Gloucestershire, England

Coordinates: 51.6136°N 2.5301°W

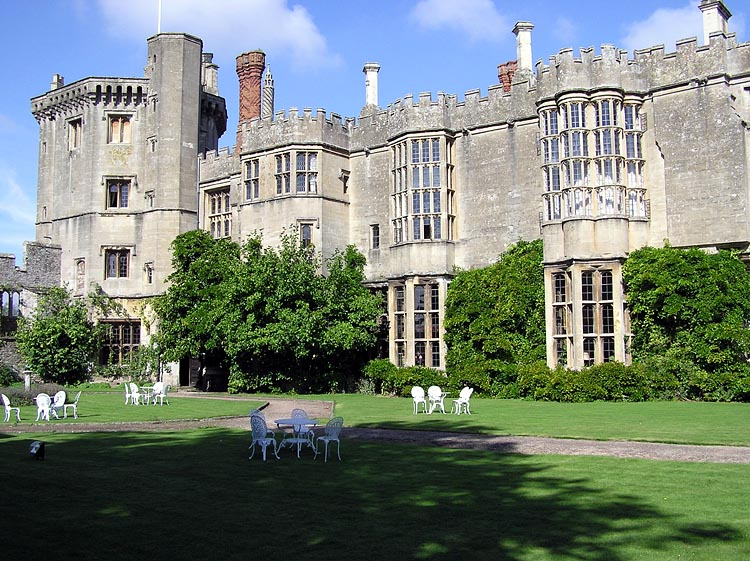
Thornbury Castle, west front

Thornbury Castle is a Tudor castle in the town of Thornbury, in Gloucestershire, England, erected next to the parish church of St Mary. Construction was begun in 1511 as a further residence for Edward Stafford, 3rd Duke of Buckingham (1478–1521), of Stafford Castle in Staffordshire. It is not a true military fortress but rather an early example of a Tudor country house, with minimal defensive attributes.

As at Richmond Palace in Surrey, the main ranges of Thornbury framed courts, of which the symmetrical entrance range, with central gatehouse and octagonal corner towers, survives, together with two less regular side ranges with many irregular projecting features and towers. It is now a Grade I listed building that is operated as a hotel.

== History ==
There has been a settlement at Thornbury ever since the Anglo-Saxon period. The records show of a ‘manor of Thornbury’ from the early 900s. It was owned by three generations of Thegns from 900 – 1066 and it is recorded in the Domesday Book that it was owned by Algar in 1066. After the Norman Conquest it was seized by William the Conqueror and the manor was given to a Norman knight: Robert Fitz Hamon. After passing through 3 generations of the Hamon family, in 1344, Margaret Audley married Ralph, Earl of Stafford and the manor passed into the hands of the Stafford family.

It would have been a good location for a manor house as it was only 2 miles from the River Severn and its smaller tributary streams would have provided easy access to water for those living in Thornbury, but as it is situated on higher ground than the river, it is not at risk of flooding. There was land cleared for farming and the soil was fertile because it is in the Severn estuary. Estuaries are full of decaying plants and animals, which makes the soil rich in nutrients. There was also a woodland nearby, providing wood for firewood and to build the manor house. Thornbury is also suitable for a manor house because it had good transport links. There was a farming community here and Thornbury is only 10 miles from Bristol. The river provided a good route for travel and trade.

In 1510 Edward Stafford, 3^{rd} Duke of Buckingham began a decade of building work, having received a licence to castellate his manor at Thornbury. The duke needed a home more suitable for his status as the wealthiest noble in England: owning 11 castles, 124 manors, 9 forests, 24 parks and 8000 deer. In keeping with the fashion of the Early Modern Period of building castellated manor houses he largely replaced the manor house with a much more impressive building with fashionable castle features, but also some more serious defensive features too. Despite owning so many other residences he chose to make Thornbury his main home, Its closeness to the important port of Bristol (luxury goods such as spices, sugar and silks would have been shipped into the port) and also to the Welsh marches, where he owned land and was responsible for law and order, would have made it a suitable site for his main home. It is also close to a quarry in the village of Tytherington which would have provided rough ‘rubble’ stone used for the curtain walls. Some have argued that the castle was not just a luxury home, but also had a serious defensive purpose, in which case its location at the bottom of Thornbury hill seems strange: although it has an excellent view over the Severn into Wales, the view is obscured by the hill. The most obvious explanation for the castle’s location is that it was sited on the location of the former manor house (which probably co-existed with the castle for a while but has now completely disappeared).

The most significant change to the site was The Duke of Buckingham’s building work 1510-1521, which developed the manor house described by John Leland as being ‘of no great estimacion’ (not particularly impressive) into a large, castellated palace, built in the latest fashionable style. The manor house had been a mixture of timber and stone, with a tiled roof. The new ‘Thornbury Castle’ was built in expensive, dressed (carefully shaped) ashlar stone, brought in from the Cotswolds and included lots of patterned, ornate brick chimneys (brick being an expensive material as it had to be handmade). The new castle was much larger than the manor house, it included a great hall for entertaining, a privy kitchen and a larger ‘great kitchen’ to enable entertaining on a grand scale. According to John Leland it was built ‘castelle lyke’ with crenelations and machicolations giving the polygonal towers and curtain walls the right castle styling in line with the fashionable building style of the day. There were offices in the western range from which all the business of the estate and the duke’s extensive lands could be conducted. Controversially, the duke also seems to have built barracks to house up to 200 retainers (servants illegally trained as soldiers) in the Northern Range (evidence by the fireplaces still visible halfway up the walls – showing the area was intended for domestic living, not just storage).

900~1066: The manor house is used as a centre for administration of Thornbury over three generations of Anglo-Saxon thegns: Alyward, Brictric and Algar. The Great Hall of the manor would have been a location for a regular court settling local disputes, petty theft etc, with the Lord or his steward acting as judge and local people as jury.

1066: The Manor is still used as a centre for local administration, but under the lordship of a Norman knight: Robert Fitz Hamon.

1344~1510: The Manor house is one of many residences owned by the Stafford family. It is still responsible for governing the local area.

1509: Edward Stafford was given a licence to castellate Thornbury Manor house.

1504: Edward Stafford (Duke of Buckingham) was given responsibility over the Welsh marches of South Wales by Henry VII.

1510~1521: Under Henry VIII, Stafford began to extensively rebuild his much smaller manor house as a grand, castellated palace. However, he included some serious defensive features too, leaving many historians unclear about his purpose for the building. Was it just a luxury home, built in the latest style of the day to demonstrate the wealth and status of the leading noble in England and accommodate his grand lifestyle? Or a serious defensive building, from which he could one day challenge the Tudors for the throne of England, as he was rumoured to be planning, and executed for treason because of.

== Today ==
The castle is now a 26-room luxury hotel and restaurant, and a venue for weddings. Between 1966 and 1986 the castle was operated as one of the UK's top restaurants by Kenneth Bell with staff including food writer Nigel Slater and MasterChef New Zealand judge Simon Gault early in their culinary careers.

The property had been a member of the Relais & Châteaux association since November 2021.

== Locomotive ==
There was a GWR Castle class 4-6-0 locomotive in preservation named 7027 Thornbury Castle. In August 2022 the future of Thornbury Castle was called into question when the Great Western Society's 4709 Group bought the locomotive with the intention of donating the boiler to its project to re-create a GWR 4700 Class. Thornbury Castle's chassis and other components were to be used to recreate a GWR Star class locomotive.

== Images ==
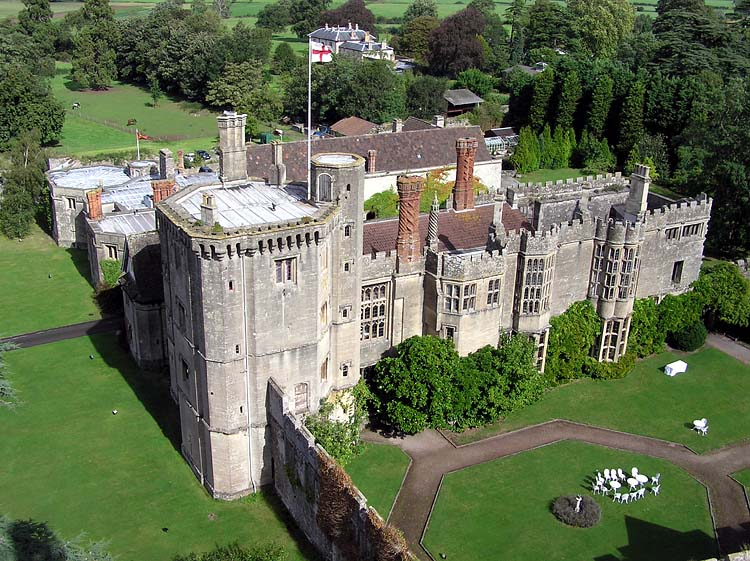
The Castle seen from the top of St Mary's Church tower

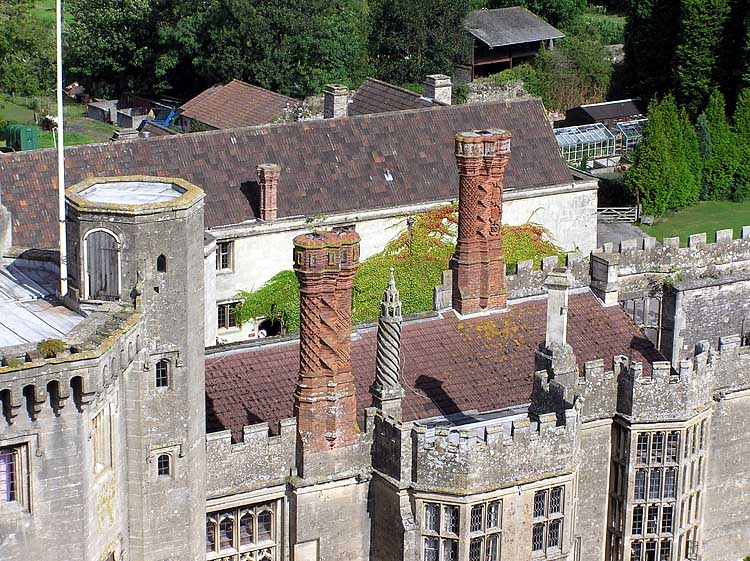
Detail of Castle chimneys

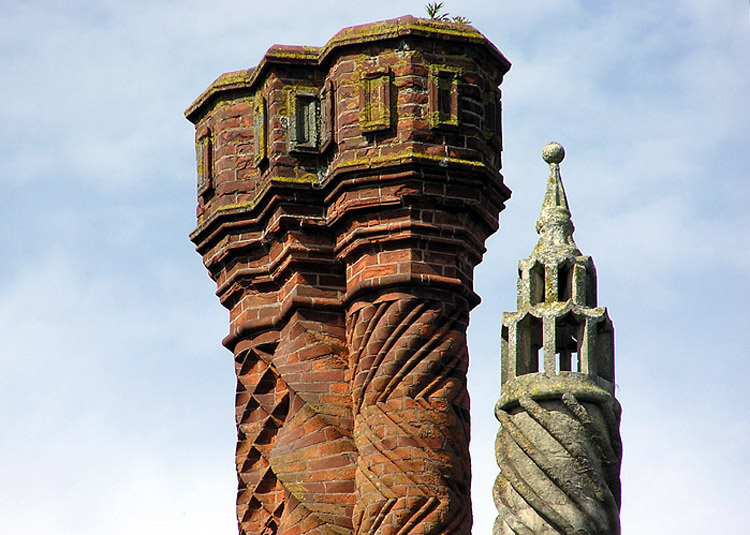
Thornbury Castle chimney detail, brickwork built in 1514

== See also ==
- Castles in Great Britain and Ireland
- List of castles in England
