= MasterChef New Zealand series 2 =

MasterChef New Zealand
- Season 2
- No. of episodes: 13

Release
- Original network: TV One
- Original release: February 20 – May 15, 2011

Series chronology
- ← Previous; Series 1 Next → Series 3

The second series of MasterChef New Zealand was filmed in September 2010 and started airing on 20 February 2011. It saw the induction of Josh Emett to the judging panel, replacing series 1 judge Ross Burden. Jax Hamilton and Nadia Lim competed in the grand finale, which was screened on 15 May 2011. It consisted of four challenges: a taste test, a pressure test, a mystery box challenge and an extreme dessert challenge, each worth a maximum of 20 points, except for the pressure test, which was worth a maximum of 40 points. Nadia became New Zealand's second MasterChef, beating Jax 88 points to 75.

== Elimination table ==
Place	Contestant	Episode											
Place	Contestant	3	4	5	6	7		8	9	10	11	12	13
1	Nadia	WIN	IN	WIN	IN	IN	LOW	WIN	IN	IN	WIN	WIN	WINNER
2	Jax	IN	WIN	LOW	LOW	IN	PT	LOW	WIN	IN	LOW	LOW	RUNNER-UP
3	Stu	IN	IN	WIN	IN	WIN	WIN	IN	WIN	WIN	WIN	ELIM	
4	Tracey Lee	IN	IN	IN	WIN	IN	PT	IN	IN	LOW	ELIM		
5	Michael	IN	LOW	IN	IN	IN	WIN	IN	LOW	ELIM			
6	Cameron	WIN	WIN	IN	IN	IN	WIN	LOW	ELIM				
7	Anthony	IN	IN	IN	WIN	IN	WIN	ELIM					
8	Fiona	IN	IN	IN	IN	IN	ELIM						
9	Michelle	IN	IN	IN	ELIM								
9	Sam	IN	IN	IN	ELIM								
11	Robert	LOW	ELIM										
12	Kathleen	ELIM											

This Contestant Won The Competition.
This Contestant Was The Runner-up.
This Contestant Won The Elimination Challenge.
This Contestant Was In the Winning Team.
This Contestant Was In The Bottom Two.
This Contestant Was Eliminated.

== Contestants ==
Contestant	Hometown	Rank
Kathleen Te Raki	Christchurch	12th
Robert Jacobs	Christchurch	11th
Sam Henderson	Auckland	10th
Michelle Berry	Pahiatua	10th
Fiona Reed	Kaikōura	8th
Anthony McEntee	Auckland	7th
Cameron Petley	Putāruru	6th
Michael Lee	Auckland	5th
Tracey Lee Hooten	Taupō	4th
Stu Todd	Dunedin	3rd
Jax Hamilton	Christchurch	Runner-up
Nadia Lim	Auckland	Winner
