= MasterChef New Zealand series 5 =

MasterChef New Zealand
- Series 5
- No. of episodes: 37 (including 10 MasterClass episodes)

Release
- Original network: TV One
- Original release: 2 February – 4 May 2014

Season chronology
- ← Previous; Series 4 Next → Series 6

The fifth series of MasterChef New Zealand was announced in May 2013. Unlike previous series, this series was based around pairs of contestants, similar to the format of Australian series My Kitchen Rules. The series premiered on 2 February 2014. It ran from 7:30 pm through 8:30 pm. (Note: The episode that aired on Easter Sunday, Episode 23, ran for only 45 minutes and hence finished at 8:15 pm, due to the lack of advertisements. The Grand Final went for two hours and hence finished at 9:30 pm.) Regular episodes aired on Sundays and Mondays, and MasterClass episodes on Saturdays. It was integrated with social media with the hashtag #MasterChefNZ. Karena and Kasey Bird won, with Bec Stanley and Jaimie Stodler as the runners-up.

== Contestants ==
| Duo | | Relationship | Hometown | Rank |
|---|---|---|---|---|
| Karena Bird | Kasey Bird | Sisters | Maketu, Bay of Plenty | 1st |
| Bec Stanley | Jaimie Stodler | Friends | Arrowtown | 2nd |
| Nikki Shearer | Jordan Shearer | Mother & Daughter | Lower Hutt | 3rd |
| Tanisha Kemp | Verena Doolabh | Sisters | Melbourne, Australia & Mount Maunganui | 4th |
| Shelley Robinson | Trudie Robinson | Sisters | Auckland & Tauranga | 5th |
| Glynn Rudolph | James Culleton | Flatmates | Wellington | 6th |
| Cerry Sim | Jack Tan | New Duo | Whakatāne & Auckland | 7th |
| Elizabeth Marshall | Jenn Clark | Former Partners | Wellington | 8th |
| Catherine Chen | | Jack's Flatmate | Whakatane | 9th |
| Melanie Sim | | Cerry's Sister | Auckland | 9th |
| Paul Harrison | Brigitte Kriehn | Friends | Auckland | 10th |
| Donna-Marie Sullivan | Jon Odering | Mother & Son | Dunedin | 11th |
| Collette Lochore | Sam Dolbel | Engaged | Waimauku, Auckland | 12th |
| Bronwyn Bijl | Fiona Marris | Sisters | Christchurch | 13th |
| Courtney Crammond | Matt Crammond | Siblings | Christchurch | 14th |
| Janaina Mendes | Thiago de Almeida Schalch | Friends | Auckland | 15th |

== Elimination ==
| Order | Episode | | | | | | | | | | | | | | | | | | | |
| Order | 2 | 3 | 4 | 5^{1} | 6^{2} | 7 | 8 | 9^{1} | 10 | 11/12^{3} | 13 | 14^{2} | 15^{1} | 16^{1} | 17^{1} | 18 | 19/20^{3} | 21/22^{3} | 24-26^{3} | Grand Final |
|---|---|---|---|---|---|---|---|---|---|---|---|---|---|---|---|---|---|---|---|---|
| Karena / Kasey | HIGH | WIN | WIN | HIGH | IN | HIGH | HIGH | IN | WIN | WIN | WIN | IN | HIGH | IN | HIGH | HIGH | WIN | WIN | WIN | WINNERS |
| Bec / Jaimie | IN | IN | IN | HIGH | IN | IN | IN | IN | WIN | Btm 2 | Btm 5 | IN | IN | IN | WIN | IN | Btm 2 | HIGH | Btm 2 | RUNNERS-UP |
| Jordan / Nikki | WIN | HIGH | HIGH | HIGH | IN | HIGH | IN | WIN | Btm 3 | WIN | Btm 5 | Btm 2 | WIN | IN | IN | WIN | HIGH | Btm 2 | ELIM | |
| Tanisha / Verena | IN | HIGH | IN | HIGH | IN | HIGH | IN | Btm 3 | IN | IN | WIN | IN | IN | IN | IN | IN | HIGH | ELIM | | |
| Shelley / Trudie | HIGH | IN | IN | Btm 6 | IN | IN | HIGH | WIN | IN | IN | Btm 5 | IN | IN | WIN | IN | IN | ELIM | | | |
| Glynn / James | Btm 3 | IN | Btm 3 | Btm 6 | IN | IN | Btm 2 | Btm 3 | IN | WIN | Btm 5 | IN | IN | WIN | IN | ELIM | | | | |
| Cerry / Jack | | | | | | | | | IN | WIN | Btm 5 | ELIM | | | | | | | | |
| Elizabeth / Jenn | IN | Btm 2 | Btm 3 | Btm 6 | IN | Btm 2 | IN | IN | IN | ELIM | | | | | | | | | | |
| Catherine / Jack | IN | IN | HIGH | HIGH | IN | HIGH | IN | Btm 3 | ELIM | | | | | | | | | | | |
| Cerry / Melanie | IN | HIGH | IN | HIGH | IN | IN | HIGH | WIN | ELIM | | | | | | | | | | | |
| Brigitte / Paul | IN | IN | IN | Btm 6 | WIN | IN | ELIM | | | | | | | | | | | | | |
| Donna-Marie / Jon | IN | IN | IN | Btm 6 | IN | ELIM | | | | | | | | | | | | | | |
| Collette / Sam | IN | IN | IN | Btm 6 | ELIM | | | | | | | | | | | | | | | |
| Bronwyn / Fiona | IN | HIGH | ELIM | | | | | | | | | | | | | | | | | |
| Courtney / Matt | Btm 3 | ELIM | | | | | | | | | | | | | | | | | | |
| Janaina / Thiago | ELIM | | | | | | | | | | | | | | | | | | | |

There was no elimination in this episode
Only duos who were in the bottom group in the last episode competed in this episode
Multi-episode challenge
This duo won the competition.
This duo was the runner-up.
This duo performed best the challenge.
This duo performed well in a challenge where no top duo was announced.
This duo was on the winning team.
This duo did not compete in this challenge.
This duo was made from the strongest members of two duos eliminated in the previous challenge.
This duo was in the bottom group.
This duo was eliminated.

== Episodes ==
| No. | Title | Original release date | NZ viewers (overnight; thousands) |
|---|---|---|---|
| 1 | "Episode 1" | 2 February 2014 | 449.0 |
A number of shortlisted duos prepared two audition dishes. The results of these decided the top 15.
| 2 | "Episode 2" | 3 February 2014 | 420.2 |
Teams had two hours and five minutes to replicate two of Donna Hay's 'Little Black Forest Cakes'. One person from each duo cooked during the first hour, primarily baking the cakes, and the other person from each duo worked in the last hour, primarily assembling and decorating the cake. The five-minute interval in between was the only time the duo had to communicate with each other during the challenge. Jordan & Nikki won the challenge, and were given an advantage in the next challenge.
| 3 | "Episode 3" | 9 February 2014 | 494.5 |
Teams had one hour to cook one lamb dish and one offal dish. As winners of the last challenge, Jordan & Nikki got to decide which cut of lamb each team would get, as well as which offal, of either brains or kidney. They said they chose which cuts to give to which duo based on what they thought the duo was capable of. Several duos served the judges partially raw kidney, which they refused to eat. Courtney & Matt were eliminated.
| 4 | "Episode 4" | 10 February 2014 | 374.5 |
Duos were given, at random, a fridge from a random New Zealand household. They had one hour to construct a main and dessert from the fridge's contents, along with flour and sugar. Cerry & Melanie also made an entree, but weren't penalized. Jordan & Nikki's and Jack & Catherine's were described as being "technically brilliant". Glynn & James performed best out of the teams in the bottom three.
| 5 | "Episode 5" | 16 February 2014 | 386.4 |
Set in the Bay of Islands town of Russell, duos had 30 minutes to shuck and prepare oysters three ways - one au naturale, one deep-fried, and the other dressed. Judge Simon Gault was absent from this and the next episode.
| 6 | "Episode 6" | 17 February 2014 | 452.9 |
The six duos who performed the poorest in the previous challenge cooked one of six courses (two entrees, two mains, and two desserts) with the help of Josh Emett for 185 guests, including the six duos who performed the best in the previous episode, Ray McVinnie, and guest judge Anton at the Duke of Marlborough Hotel. The six duos who performed the best in the previous challenge won a scenic boat trip and sunset drinks at the Eagles Nest, then dined at the Duke of Marlborough and judged each dish. Paul & Brigette's dish was judged to be the best, and Collette & Sam's dish the worst. Collette & Sam were eliminated.
| 7 | "Episode 7" | 23 February 2014 | 492.0 |
Duos had 90 minutes to replicate Daniel Wilsons' take on a French dish. Donna-Marie & Jon were eliminated.
| 8 | "Episode 8" | 24 February 2014 | 475.4 |
Duos had to prepare a dish with a fish selected at random. Paul & Brigitte were eliminated.
| 9 | "MasterClass - Episode 1" | 1 March 2014 | 243.0 |
| 10 | "Episode 9" | 2 March 2014 | 436.1 |
| 11 | "Episode 10" | 3 March 2014 | 421.8 |
Duos made and presented their own take of a classic New Zealand main and the pavlova. Cerry & Melanie and Jack & Catherine were in the bottom two, but the judges felt that Jack and Cerry were the best of their duo, so put them together in a new duo and eliminated Melanie and Catherine.
| 12 | "MasterClass - Episode 2" | 8 March 2014 | 238.0 |
Josh Emett and Ray McVinnie cooked their own versions of a lamb roast.
| 13 | "Episode 11" | 9 March 2014 | 495.4 |
Part 1 of 2. Duos were split into two teams (selected by the winners of the last challenge, Karena & Kasey and Bec & Jaimie), and each prepared an eight-course degustation menu. Teams were given 3 hours and twenty minutes, with courses due after the first 80 minutes, and then every 20 minutes afterwards. Each duo was responsible for two courses.
| 14 | "Episode 12" | 10 March 2014 | 427.6 |
Part 2 of 2. Duos continued preparing and presenting the last four courses of their eight-course degustation menu. The judges name Karena & Kasey's team as the winner, with Bec & Jaimie and Elizabeth & Jen named in the bottom two. A cook-off is called to decide which team is eliminated, with the two duos having 10 minutes to cook a whitebait fritter with aioli. Bec & Jaimie win the cook-off and Elizabeth & Jen are eliminated.
| 15 | "MasterClass - Episode 3" | 15 March 2014 | 276.2 |
Guest chef Sean Armstrong from Auckland Bakery Loaf joined MasterChef judges Josh Emett and Ray McVinnie to bake three desserts.
| 16 | "Episode 13" | 16 March 2014 | 475.7 |
Duos cooked rabbit dishes for guest chef Ben Bayley.
| 17 | "Episode 14" | 17 March 2014 | 447.4 |
The bottom five duos from the last challenged faced a cook-off.
| 18 | "MasterClass - Episode 4" | 22 March 2014 | 264.8 |
Josh and Ray cooked dishes using fresh pasta.
| 19 | "Episode 15" | 23 March 2014 | 446.0 |
The top six duos cooked veal three ways for Australian culinary legend George Calombaris.
| 20 | "Episode 16" | 24 March 2014 | 440.9 |
The top six duos competed in a burger cook-off.
| 21 | "MasterClass - Episode 5" | March 29, 2014 | 246.7 |
Josh and Simon cooked dishes featuring veal and venison.
| 22 | "Episode 17" | March 30, 2014 | 442.3 |
Duos made raw fish salad on the beach at the Return To Paradise resort in Samoa.
| 23 | "Episode 18" | March 31, 2014 | 488.7 |
Duos cooked on open fires on the beach at the Return To Paradise resort in Samoa.
| 24 | "MasterClass - Episode 6" | April 5, 2014 | 221.8 |
In Samoa, Josh and Simon visit markets in Apia and cook with local ingredients.
| 25 | "Episode 19" | April 6, 2014 | 483.8 |
One contestant from each duo faced a solo risotto challenge without their partner. Jordan, Jaimie, Karena, Trudie, and Tanisha compete. Several contestants noted that they hadn't come on the show to cook individually.
| 26 | "Episode 20" | April 7, 2014 | 512.5 |
The second contestant from each duo faced a solo dessert challenge without their partner. Nikki, Bec, Kasey, Shelley, and Verena compete.
| 27 | "MasterClass - Episode 7" | April 12, 2014 | 260.5 |
Simon demonstrated cooking a Caesar salad risotto for the competitors in Episode 19, while Ray demonstrated making an orange and almond syrup cake for the competitors in Episode 20.
| 28 | "Episode 21" | April 13, 2014 | 484.5 |
In Bali, each team was assigned an ethnic dish at random to serve to 3000 guests. Verena & Tanisha made a dish from Japanese cuisine, Nikki & Jordan made a dish from (native) Indonesian cuisine, Kasey & Karena made a dish from Korean cuisine, and Bec & Jaimie made a dish from Chinese cuisine.
| 29 | "Episode 22" | April 14, 2014 | 470.0 |
Duos had two and a half hours to replicate a dish from Swiss-born Heinz von Holzen, an expert in Indonesian cuisine.
| 30 | "MasterClass - Episode 8" | April 19, 2014 | 216.5 |
Simon and Josh cooked with local Bali ingredients.
| 31 | "Episode 23" | April 20, 2014 | 351.9 |
Duos had one hour to make two dishes they would like to include in their first cookbook. Each duo's dishes were scored out of 10, and the results were revealed after the following challenge. Kasey & Karena scored 9; Nikki & Jordan scored 8; and Bec & Jaimie scored 7.
| 32 | "Episode 24" | April 21, 2014 | 506.0 |
Duos had two hours to make two dishes they would like to include on their restaurant's menu. Kasey & Karena scored 10; Nikki & Jordan scored 8; and Bec & Jaimie scored 9. The scores from this and the previous episode were combined, resulting in Nikki & Jordan and Bec & Jaimie placing last equal; a situation which would typically lead to a cook-off. However, the judges decided that it was too close to the final to eliminate a duo in a cook-off, so no duos were eliminated.
| 33 | "MasterClass - Episode 9" | April 26, 2014 | 264.2 |
Simon and Ray cooked dishes from their cookbooks.
| 34 | "Episode 25" | April 27, 2014 | 514.1 |
Duos had one hour to replicate Peter Gordon's dish of paddlecrab, Otago saffron linguine, dashi and pinenuts. Each dish was marked out of ten, and the results were revealed after the following challenge. Bec & Jaimie scored 9; Kasey & Karena scored 8; and Nikki & Jordan scored 8.
| 35 | "Episode 26" | April 28, 2014 | 510.6 |
Duos had 90 minutes to replicate Michel Louws' beef tartare and Taupō beef rump dish. Each dish was scored out of ten. Bec & Jaimie scored 7; Kasey & Karena scored 8; and Nikki & Jordan scored 6. This meant that, for the past four challenges, Kasey & Karena scored 35, Bec & Jaimie scored 32; and Nikki & Jordan scored 30. As a result, Nikki & Jordan were eliminated.
| 36 | "MasterClass - Episode 10" | May 3, 2014 | 230.0 |
The final Masterclass.
| 37 | "Grand Final" | May 4, 2014 | 602.0 |
This episode was two hours long. Duos partook in three challenges, the combined score of which determined the winner. Challenge 1: Matt Moran Pressure Test; Duos had two hours to replicate Matt Moran's dish - a lobster with ricotta gnudi and butter sauce, and roast baby lamb with three different cuts. Both teams agreed that they would like an extra ten minutes, which was granted. Each dish was marked out of ten. Of Bec & Jaimie's dish, Matt thought that the components were cooked perfectly, but that the pea puree wasn't smooth enough. Simon and Josh thought that the lobster dish was perfect. Ray thought that the presentation and seasoning weren't up to standard. Of Kasey & Karena's dish, Matt noticed that the lamb was undercooked. Simon noted that he found that worrying, although he liked their pea puree. Ray thought everything except the lamb was well cooked. Not many judges could find positive things to say about the lobster. Challenge 2: Service Challenge; Duos traveled to Queenstown to cook for 180 people at the opening of Josh's new restaurant, Madam Woo. Josh judged their performance in the kitchen, and Simon and Ray their dishes. To ensure that the dishes were ready in time, both duos were eventually given chef to help them - Bec & Jaimie had two and Kasey & Karena had one. Ray and Simon decided that the dishes were too close to judge, so Josh awarded each team their score out of twenty instead of both aspects being marked out of ten. Josh thought that Kasey and Bec were the best workers in the kitchen, so gave both teams the same score. Challenge 3: Replicating judges' dishes Duos have three hours to replicate three dishes, one by each judge. Simon’s dish is Kuzu bread with tomato jam and gazpacho jelly, Josh’s dish is a pork fillet in savoy cabbage, and Ray’s dish is a chocolate trifle cake with marinated prunes. Each dish was marked out of twenty, meaning there were a possible 60 points to be earned for the challenge. Of Bec & Jaimie's dishes, Simon thought that the bread had needed more cooking and that the absence of basil was a big problem; Josh could see that all the ingredients were present and thought that pig's head was as good as his; Ray could see a crack in the cake, but he thought that it was still a great cake. Of Kasey & Karena's dishes, Simon though his dish is perfect; Josh was satisfied with his dish despite some elements being absent; and Ray thought that the presentation wasn't perfect but that it was a good cake nevertheless.: No. / Dish / Bec & Jaimie / Kasey & Karena; 1 / Lobster / 9 / 8; 1 / Lamb / 9 / 8; 1 / Subtotal / 18 / 16; 2 / Kitchen work / 18 / 18; 2 / Subtotal / 18 / 18; 3 / Simon's dish / 15 / 20; 3 / Josh's dish / 18 / 16; 3 / Ray's dish / 14 / 16; 3 / Subtotal / 47 / 52; Total / / 83 / 86
