= Pigeon statues in Wellington =

Sculptures in New Zealand

Delivereasy pigeon, 22 Wigan Street

There are several bronze pigeon sculptures distributed around Wellington, New Zealand. They were designed by artist Jonathan Campbell and are placed around local businesses, each posed interacting with an object relating to the business. Ten of these sculptures were designed, and as of April 2024 two are missing.

== History ==
Ten bronze pigeon statues designed by artist Jonathan Campbell were installed around Wellington, a city inhabited by pigeons, in 2022. They were placed around local businesses, with each designed to be interacting with an object that is in some way related to the business and how it was created. For example, there is a pigeon eating out of a peanut butter jar in a park, which is where peanut butter company Fix & Fogg first thought of starting the company. The pigeon statues were part of WellingtonNZ's "Only in Wellington" campaign. Rather than being permanent, the sculptures were designed to only last a few years.

The pigeons were installed at the following locations:

- Plimmer Steps, on the blue table halfway up. This pigeon, named Patty, went missing in 2023. The pigeon was designed for Wellington On a Plate, and is posed standing on a burger sculpture, which was placed on a wooden table. The table was stolen too. WellingtonNZ offered a $100 Burger Wellington voucher in return for the statue. It was found a few weeks later and needed repairs as it had been dumped in a bush.
- 22 Wigan St, representing Delivereasy.
- Kent Terrace crossing, in front of the Embassy Theatre, in a garden bed. The pigeon, named Precious, went missing in 2024. It represented Richard Taylor and Tania Rodger of Wētā Workshop.
- Corner of Hunter and Featherston Streets – garden planter
- Aro Park in Aro Valley, on a table-top. A pigeon with its head stuck in a jar of peanut butter, representing Fix & Fogg.
- Aro Valley GP, east side entrance
- Karaka Cafe, in a planter box near the lagoon
- Royal Port Nicholson Yacht Club
- Cuba Street near Ben and Jerry’s – garden planter. Pepperoni, a pigeon with a slice of pizza in its beak, went missing in 2024. The pizza slice was not stolen. To mourn the missing pigeon, members of the public created a memorial shrine by placing flowers and candles where it was located.
- Egmont Street, outside an eatery in a planter box

Regarding the pigeons that have been stolen, Campbell said that when he placed the sculptures around Wellington, he expected them to be gone by the following week.
