= MasterChef New Zealand series 1 =

MasterChef New Zealand
- Season 1
- No. of episodes: 13

Release
- Original network: TV One
- Original release: February 3 – April 28, 2010

Series chronology
- Next → Series 2

The first series of MasterChef New Zealand was judged by Simon Gault, Ross Burden and Ray McVinnie. Brett McGregor and Kelly Young competed in the final showdown with Brett emerging as the first New Zealand MasterChef.

== Elimination Chart ==
No.	Contestants	Episode											
No.	Contestants	3	4	5	6	7	8	9		10	11	12	13
1	Brett	HIGH	IN	WIN	IN	IN	IN	IN	IN	LOW	LOW	IN	WINNER
2	Kelly	WIN	IN	IN	ELIM			RET	WIN	IN	IN	IN	RUNNER-UP
3	Tracey	WIN	IN	ELIM				RET	WIN	IN	WIN	ELIM	
3	Steve	IN	WIN	WIN	IN	WIN	IN	IN	IN	WIN	IN	ELIM	
5	Nigel	IN	IN	WIN	WIN	ELIM		RET	WIN	IN	ELIM		
6	Kirsty	HIGH	LOW	WIN	IN	WIN	WIN	IN	ELIM				
7	Karyn	LOW	IN	IN	IN	WIN	WIN	IN	ELIM				
7	Mark	HIGH	IN	IN	IN	WIN	IN	IN	ELIM				
7	Sue	IN	WIN	WIN	IN	IN	IN	IN	ELIM				
10	Rob	HIGH	IN	LOW	IN	LOW	ELIM						
11	Andrew	IN	ELIM										
12	Christine	ELIM											

This Contestant Won The Competition.
This Contestant Was The Runner-up.
This Contestant Won The Elimination Challenge.
This Contestant Was In The Bottom 2.
This Contestant Was In the Winning Team.
This Contestant Was Eliminated.

== Contestants ==
Contestant	Age	Hometown	Occupation	Rank
Christine Hobbs	51	Auckland	Designer	12th
Andrew Spear	24	Auckland	Sports Journalist	11th
Robert "Rob" Trathen	36	Auckland	Photographer	10th
Karyn Fisk	21	Nelson	Stay-at-home Mom	7th
Mark Harvey	39	Auckland	Software Developer	7th
Susan "Sue" Drummond	61	Wānaka	Housewife	7th
Kirsty Cardy	28	Auckland	Produce Promoter	6th
Nigel Anderson	39	Taupō	Restaurant Manager	5th
Steve Juergens	35	Auckland	Graphic Designer	4th
Tracey Gunn	35	Auckland	Scientist	3rd
Kelly Young	26	Auckland	Fitness Instructor	Runner-up
Brett McGregor	37	Christchurch	Teacher	Winner
