= MasterChef New Zealand series 3 =

MasterChef New Zealand
- Season 3
- No. of episodes: 17

Release
- Original network: TV One
- Original release: February 21 – June 12, 2012

Season chronology
- ← Previous; Series 2 Next → Series 4

The third series of MasterChef New Zealand was broadcast in 2012. Filming started in November 2011. The series started on 21 February 2012. This season the number of contestants changed from 12 to 16, also increasing the number of episode from 12-13 to 16-17. The winner was Chelsea Winter, who beat runner-up Ana Schwarz 77 points to 72.

== Contestants ==
Contestants	Age	Origin	Occupation	Status	Winnings
Chelsea Winter	27	Auckland	Marketing Executive	Winner 12 June	5
Ana Schwarz	39	Waiheke Island	Stay-at-home Mom	Runner-Up 12 June	8
Tony Price	34	Auckland	Foliage Supplier	Eliminated 5 June	3
Brenton Thornton	24	Auckland	Landscaper	Eliminated 29 May	3
Charlene McGeghan	34	Fiji/Owhata, Rotorua	Stay-at-home Mom	Eliminated 15 May	7
Matthew "Matt" Gilray	27	Christchurch	Butcher	Eliminated 8 May	2
Zee Tana	26	Kamo, Whangārei	Travel Consultant	Eliminated 1 May	4
David "Dave" McKinnon	31	Christchurch	Web Analyst	Eliminated 25 April	2
Chantelle O'Brien	29	Ashburton	Bar Owner	Eliminated 18 April	3
Andrea Bathgate	27	Auckland	Nurse	Eliminated 11 April	2
Chris Turner	26	Christchurch	Business Development Manager	Eliminated 4 April	0
Alana Harper	26	Timaru	Cafe Manager	Eliminated 28 March	2
Andy Currin	36	Wellington	IT Consultant	Withdrew 28 March	1
Ben Monroe	31	Russell	Construction Worker	Eliminated 21 March	1
Al Markham	62	Wellington	Truck Driver	Eliminated 14 March	0
Chelsea Holmes	23	Auckland	Stay-at-home Mom	Eliminated 7 March	0

== Elimination table ==
Place	Contestant	Episode															
Place	Contestant	3	4	5	6	7		8	9	10	11	12	13	14	15	16	17
1	Chelsea W.	WIN	IN	LOW	IN	IN	LOW	IN	IN	IN	WIN	LOW	WIN	LOW	IN	WIN	WINNER
2	Ana	WIN	IN	WIN	IN	IN	WIN	WIN	LOW	WIN	IN	WIN	LOW	WIN	LOW	WIN	RUNNER-UP
3	Tony	LOSE	IN	LOSE	IN	IN	LOSE	IN	IN	LOW	WIN	WIN	IN	LOW	WIN	ELIM	
4	Brenton	WIN	IN	WIN	IN	IN	WIN	IN	IN	IN	IN	IN	IN	IN	ELIM		
5	Charlene	WIN	WIN	WIN	WIN	IN	WIN	WIN	IN	WIN	IN	IN	ELIM				
6	Matt	LOSE	IN	LOSE	IN	WIN	WIN	LOW	IN	LOW	LOW	ELIM					
7	Zee	WIN	WIN	LOW	LOW	IN	WIN	IN	WIN	IN	ELIM						
8	Dave	WIN	IN	LOSE	LOW	IN	LOSE	IN	WIN	ELIM							
9	Chantelle	LOSE	IN	WIN	IN	WIN	WIN	IN	ELIM								
10	Andrea	LOSE	IN	WIN	IN	WIN	LOW	ELIM									
11	Chris	LOSE	IN	LOSE	IN	IN	ELIM										
12	Alana	WIN	LOW	WIN	ELIM												
13	Andy	LOSE	IN	WIN	WDR												
14	Ben	WIN	IN	ELIM													
15	Al	LOW	ELIM														
16	Chelsea H.	ELIM															

^Note 1Andy withdrew from the competition at the beginning of Episode 6 due to health concerns.
This Contestant Won The Competition.
This Contestant Was The Runner-up.
This Contestant Won The Elimination Challenge.
This Contestant Was In the Winning Team.
This Contestant was in the bottom group.
This Contestant withdrew from the competition.
This Contestant was eliminated.

== Episodes ==
No.	Title	Original release date	Viewers
1	"Episode 1"	February 21, 2012	N/A
2	"Episode 2"	February 28, 2012	N/A
3	"Episode 3"	March 6, 2012	591,188
Contestants were split into two teams and had to make 25 loafs of eight different types of bread at Auckland's Loaf Handcrafted Breads, before delivering them to the 'Fish' restaurant at the Hilton Hotel Auckland for judging. Despite losing half the ciabatta loafs and some other disasters, including the teams having to evacuate due to a fire alarm which caused most of their breads to over-proof, the Red Team emerged victorious because of their overall better performance. The worst performer on the Blue Team, and therefore the first person eliminated from the competition, was Chelsea Holmes with her undercooked and uneven gluten-free Spicy Carrot Loaf.
4	"Episode 4"	March 13, 2012	529,399
Each contestant had to make their versions of three "classic" New Zealand takeaway dishes: fish and chips, hamburger, and pizza. Michael Van de Elzen, of the TV One television series The Food Truck, guest judges. Zee and Charlene were the top two, each with an overall score of 27/30. Al and Alana ended up in the bottom two, Alana delivering a pizza deemed "unpalatable" by Ray and Al's dishes "just missing a stomach pump" according to Josh. With 3 very poor dishes, Al was eliminated.
5	"Episode 5"	March 20, 2012	598,666
Contestants were split into two teams and had to make 130 canapés of fourteen different varieties aboard HMNZS Canterbury for the Royal New Zealand Navy's 70th anniversary.
6	"Episode 6"	March 27, 2012	543,333
After Andy left the competition due to health concerns, contestants were faced with a combined Pressure & Invention Test set by chef Che Barrington of MooChowChow restaurant in Auckland. They were given 90 minutes to replicate his signature dish (Green Papaya Salad on Grilled Salmon Fillet) and make their own Thai curry and jasmin rice. Charlene and Andrea were the top two, with Charlene's curry even good enough to go on the menu of MooChowChow, according to Che. Alana, Dave and Zee were the bottom three: Alana, lacking knowledge of Thai flavours and delivering a poor replica of Che's dish, was eliminated.
7	"Episode 7"	April 3, 2012	N/A
The contestants were taken to La Cigale in Parnell, where they were split into two teams, however due to Andy's departure leaving an uneven number of contestants, the Blue Team ended up being short one member. The teams then had to cook three different courses for a rustic French banquet for 100 paying customers. Every contestant was responsible for a single dish, and beside the judges' blind tasting, Chef Warwick Brown from La Cigale would also rate their performance in the kitchen. The winning team was decided by guests' votes, who could either pick a red or a blue macaroon after the meal was finished, then the results were weighted to account for the uneven team numbers. In the end, the Red Team won (56 percent to 44) and Chris - the worst performer from the losing Blue Team - was eliminated, with the Red Team's worst performer Andrea left safe in the competition.
8	"Episode 8"	April 10, 2012	N/A
Each contestant had to make a dish in 90 minutes utilising only frozen, canned and packaged foods. Charlene and Ana were the top two, whereas competition couple Andrea and Matt were the bottom two. Despite Matt's experimental Guinness and liquorice sauce deemed "weird" by the judges, it was Andrea's sticky and rich chocolate caramel tart and undercooked pear in red wine that sent her into a teary elimination.
9	"Episode 9"	April 17, 2012	N/A
Contestants travelled to the Hawke's Bay, where they each had 60 minutes to create a dish using fresh spring lamb and spring produce, cooked alfresco on barbecues.
10	"Episode 10"	April 24, 2012	N/A
Each contestant had six hours to replicate a hamburger shaped cake made by Mathew Metcalfe of Herne Bay's Icing On the Cake, with Metcalfe guest judging. Contestants within that time also had to make a milkshake of their choice. Ana and Charlene ended in the top two again, with Ana having the best looking and Charlene the best tasting cake. Tony, Matt and Dave were the bottom three. In the end, Dave's undercooked cake and poor presentation saw him eliminated.
11	"Episode 11"	May 1, 2012	N/A
Zee was sent home.
12	"Episode 12"	May 8, 2012	N/A
Contestants travelled to Huka Lodge near Taupō, where they dined on a six-course meal prepared by the lodge's executive chef Michel Louws. The following day, each contestant had 90 minutes to replicate a randomly assigned dish from the night before, which were then blind tested by the judges. They were subsequently scored by the judges on the dishes, and by Michel on their performance in the kitchen. Tony and Ana were the first pronounced safe, each with a combined total of 17/20. The lowest score was Matt's with 12/20, sealing his elimination.
13	"Episode 13"	May 15, 2012	N/A
Contestants had two hours to replicate Michael Meredith's spin on Dark Chocolate Mousse with Tropical Fruits. Everyone visibly struggled with the highly technical elements of the dish, including a honeycomb and pineapple purée. Chelsea's dish was deemed the winner and the best replica of the original dish. Ana and Charlene were the bottom two, and it was Charlene's runny pineapple purée and lack of texture throughout the dish that saw her eliminated.
14	"Episode 14"	May 22, 2012	N/A
Contestants had two hours to create their ultimate Business Class in-flight meal under the scrutiny of Robert Smithson, chef of Alpha Flight Services. The reward for the best three performers is a trip overseas, with the losing contestant going home. The meal had to consist of four different dishes: meat, chicken, fish and vegetarian. Every meal also had to include a salad, a bread roll, and a dessert. After the two hours, they got ten minutes to re-heat and plate their cooled down dishes. Ana scored a clean sweep with all of her dishes, earning the first business class ticket on the plane to the overseas destination, revealed to be Singapore. Despite hasty plating, Brenton earned his ticket with mild curries and good crisis management when he ran short on salad garnishes. Tony and Chelsea were the bottom two, with Tony's food being too cold and Chelsea making some technical mistakes. In the end, it was revealed no one would be sent home and all four contestants would be heading to Singapore, only with Tony and Chelsea in economy class.
15	"Episode 15"	May 29, 2012	N/A
The final four were tasked with cooking traditional Hakka cuisine on the streets of Singapore. They each cooked three dishes: black pepper crab, a fish head curry and prawn noodles. During the market run prior to the challenge, Chelsea forgot lemongrass and Ana forgot her fish sauce, which they decided to swap each other for. In a move that didn't make him popular, Tony informed the judges about it. As punishment for the "illegally" obtained ingredients, Tony and Brenton received the prize for the two best dishes - a dinner at 3 Michelin star restaurant Guy Savoy - by default. The next day, they went into the kitchen at Guy Savoy to recreate one of the dishes on the menu: a roast pigeon with various garnishes, including aubergine crisps. Despite both not getting their crisps up, Chelsea and Tony managed to put up the best pigeon dishes of the day, sealing their place in the competition. Ana was saved by having the best Hakka dishes of the day "by far" according to Simon. Brenton was eliminated because of lack of flavour in both his market dishes and his pigeon. Before leaving, Brenton was offered a twelve-month culinary scholarship culminating in a job by Simon, which he gladly accepted.
16	"Episode 16"	June 5, 2012	N/A
As the winner of the series gets to publish their own cookbook, Ana, Tony and Chelsea were to present the idea for their personal cookbook to the judges joined by renowned cook and author Annabel Langbein, along with three dishes that symbolize it. Ana's cookbook idea was considered vague, but she was complimented on three good dishes. Chelsea didn't manage to sell her idea very well despite it being quite good according to the judges, but there were no major flaws in her dishes, despite a lesser combination of lamb and strawberry in her entree. Tony managed to present the most precise and clear idea for his book, but his entree suffered from slightly undercooked chicken thighs and slices of burnt chorizo that turned into "shoe leather" according to Ray. Ana was the first pronounced safely into the grand finale, and it were Tony's small mistakes that were enough to send him home.
17	"Episode 17"	June 12, 2012	N/A
Grand Finale: Round 1: In the first round, Ana and Chelsea had to guess the different ingredients of a "Ray McVinnie curry". Chelsea scored 11, Ana scored 13, giving her an early lead.; Round 2: With season 2 contestant Cameron as a guest judge, the finalists cooked an entree and a main course with one or more cuts of venison of their choice, with the main course having to be accompanied by a jus. The judges found fault with the amount of pepper on Ana's carpaccio entree, its strong flavour getting in the way of the meat, and her jus tasted more like a gravy according to Simon. Chelsea's dishes received no substantial criticism. Ana received 12 out of a possible 20 for her dishes, Chelsea received 18, giving her a four-point lead with 29 against Ana's 25.; Round 3: British-Australian celebrity chef Rick Stein set the next challenge: to cook an authentic Malaysian laksa in 60 minutes. Overall, the judges preferred the balance of flavour and "composed" presentation of Ana's dish to Chelsea's. Ana scored 17 out of 20, Chelsea got 14, giving her a 1-point lead with 43 against Ana's 42.; Round 4 (final round): Chelsea and Ana had 3 hours to reproduce Euro restaurant's Torturous Trifle, a huge and intricate ten-layered trifle with many tricky elements. Ana missed an element for her cherry jelly spheres that were supposed to go on the top by adding it to her peach jelly layer. Her layer of microwave-cooked sponge also collapsed. Chelsea's top layer of Italian meringue was undercooked and had also collapsed. Despite this error, the judges found her trifle to be better overall. Ana was given 30 points out of a possible 40, Chelsea scored 34 for a final total of 77 points over Ana's 72, winning her the title of MasterChef New Zealand 2012.
