= MasterChef New Zealand series 6 =

MasterChef New Zealand
- Series 6
- No. of episodes: 16

Release
- Original network: TV3
- Original release: 26 July – 28 September 2015

Season chronology
- ← Previous; Series 5 Next → Series 7

The sixth series of MasterChef New Zealand was announced in October 2014 in a TV3 lineup after TVNZ axed the series after 5 seasons. It premiered on 26 July 2015. Al Brown and New Zealand Co-Restaurateurs of the Year Mark Wallbank join the judging panel with Josh Emett, replacing Ray McVinnie and Simon Gault. Episodes aired on Sundays and Mondays.

== Contestants ==
Contestant	Hometown	Rank
Jess Smith	Wanganui	16th
Gideon Marisa	Auckland	15th
Amy Calway	Auckland	14th/13th
Victoria Koszegi	Auckland	14th/13th
Merran Kenworthy	Hibiscus Coast	12th
Chris Smith	Auckland	11th
Jemima Cruickshank	Auckland	10th
Sarah Glading	Auckland	9th
Ben Sheehan	Auckland	8th (withdraw)
Lily Brown	Wellington	7th
Gemma Wynne-Lewis	Hastings	6th
Richard Harris	Cheviot	5th
Glenda Clark	Christchurch	4th
Hayley Bilton	Tauranga	3rd
Leo Fernandez	Waikari	2nd
Tim Read	Auckland	1st

== Elimination chart ==
Place	Contestant	Episode															
Place	Contestant	3	4	5	6	7 ^{1}	8	9	10	11 ^{1}	12	13	14	15 ^{1}	16	17	18
1	Tim	IMM	IN	IN	HIGH	WIN	IN	Btm 3	Btm 3	IN	Btm 3	Btm 2	IN	WIN	IN	Btm 2	WINNER
2	Leo	WIN	Btm 3	HIGH	HIGH	IN	WIN	WIN	IN	WIN	IN	HIGH	WIN	WIN	Btm 2	WIN	RUNNER UP
3	Hayley	IN	IMM	WIN	IN	WIN	HIGH	Btm 3	Btm 3	IN	WIN	IN	IN	IN	WIN	ELIM	
4	Glenda	IN	IN	IN	IN	IN	IN	IN	IN	WIN	WIN	WIN	IN	IN	ELIM		
5	Richard	HIGH	IN	IN	IN	IN	IN	HIGH	IN	WIN	Btm 3	HIGH	ELIM				
6	Gemma	IMM	IN	IN	IN	WIN	HIGH	HIGH	IN	IN	WIN	ELIM					
7	Lily	Btm 3	IN	IN	IN	IN	HIGH	IN	WIN	WIN	ELIM						
8	Ben	HIGH	IMM	IN	IN	IN	Btm 3	IN	WIN	IN	WDR						
9	Sarah	IN	IN	IN	WIN	IMM	Btm 3	IN	ELIM								
10	Jemima	IN	Btm 3	IN	Btm 2	WIN	IN	ELIM									
11	Chris	IN	IN	IN	IN	WIN	ELIM										
12	Merran	IMM	WIN	IN	ELIM												
13	Amy	IN	IN	ELIM													
13	Victoria	IN	IMM	ELIM													
15	Gideon	Btm 3	ELIM														
16	Jess	ELIM															

Colour Key:

This contestant won the competition.
This contestant was the runner-up.
This contestant was immune and did not have to cook in the elimination challenge.
This contestant won the challenge and got a privilege in the next challenge.
This contestant performed well in the challenge.
This contestant was in the winning team.
This contestant was in the bottom group.
This contestant was eliminated.
This contestant withdrew from the competition.
There was no elimination in this episode

== Episodes ==
No.	Title	Original release date
1	"Episode 1"	26 July 2015
Fifty shortlisted contestants prepared an audition dish or dishes. The results of these decided the top 24.
2	"Episode 2"	2 August 2015
The top 24 were cut down to the top sixteen. Eight contestants automatically advanced based on their auditions, the other 16 cooked either pigeon, duck, quail or chicken breast for their dishes, with half of those 16 being eliminated.
3	"Episode 3"	9 August 2015
The Top 16 contestants move into the MasterChef house. Later, they face a fish challenge in the MasterChef kitchen. Ben and Richard prove successful, while Jess is eliminated.
4	"Episode 4"	10 August 2015
The Top 15 contestants face a pressure test in which they must replicate an egg dish made by French Café owner and executive chef Simon Wright. Merran won the challenge, while Gideon is eliminated.
5	"Episode 5"	16 August 2015
The Top 14 contestants face a double Mystery Box Challenge in which they must cook one savoury and one sweet dish. Hayley won the challenge with Leo in a "silver" medal. In a double elimination, Amy and Victoria are eliminated.
6	"Episode 6"	17 August 2015
The contestants must reinvent one of three classic dishes – macaroni cheese, roast lamb or trifle. Sarah won the challenge, with Leo and Tim following, and Merran is eliminated.
7	"Episode 7"	23 August 2015
The contestants face their first team challenge and first full service for foodie guests from the hospitality and media industries. The blue team (Tim, Jemima, Chris, Hayley and Gemma) won. Because all of the contestants performed well there was no elimination.
8	"Episode 8"	24 August 2015
The contestants tackle a 'heads and tails' challenge in which they must cook lesser-known cuts of meat. Gemma, Hayley and Lily serve successful dishes while Chris is eliminated.
9	"Episode 9"	30 August 2015
The Top 10 contestants cook one savoury dish and one sweet dish for the MasterChef NZ judges, this time focusing on textural elements in their dishes. Leo wins the challenge with Gemma and Richard following behind, while Jemima is eliminated.
10	"Episode 10"	31 August 2015
The contestants face a mystery box challenge where they use a blowtorch, a cream canister or a smoker. Lily and Ben served the best dishes but Sarah is eliminated.
11	"Episode 11"	6 September 2015
The contestants split into two teams of four and face a service challenge under celebrity chef Marco Pierre White. The blue team (Lily, Glenda, Leo, Richard) won. No one is eliminated.
12	"Episode 12"	7 September 2015
The contestants have a "My Mystery Food Bag Match made in Heaven" challenge presented to them by chef and season 2 winner Nadia Lim. The winner would have their recipe added to the My Food Bag cookbook, which also serves as a job trial for the winner to work for her in the company as part of the prize package. Ben quit from the competition before the challenge saying the competitive nature of the show wasn't right for his relaxed cooking style. After the challenge, Lily was eliminated.
13	"Episode 13"	13 September 2015
The contestants have to prepare a 3-way of three different types Cloudy Bay Oysters in just 15 minutes in the quick-fire challenge, with the winner winning a trip to New York, while going on work experience to work in The Musket Room under head chef Matt Lambert, which was won by Glenda, they then have 45 minutes to make a main with the same oysters (but with no restrictions of the type of oysters). Despite being impressed by the high level of dishes by all contestants throughout the day, Gemma's attempt to make raviolli in 45 minutes was praised by the judges, but Josh Emmett noted them being too thick and doughy, which caused her to be eliminated.
14	"Episode 14"	14 September 2015
In a pressure test, the contestants has 90 minutes to replicate a signature dish of MasterChef Australia judge and The Press Club owner George Calombaris - Greek style creme brulee where they will need to do three different cream mousses and utilise liquid nitrogen. Richard was eliminated due to him over-whipping and portions of the mascarpone cream negatively affected the taste the most. Emett also hinted the next challenge will be a team challenge in Dubai, which left Leo in tears as it was Richard's dream to travel there.
15	"Episode 15"	20 September 2015
The top 4 were flown to the middle of Arabian desert for some sightseeing, which Glenda couldn't take in the scenes due to her fear of heights. Then they rode camels into the next challenge to cook a seven-course invention test in 90 minutes plus 45 minutes on a fire pit to finish the meal for Middle-Eastern cuisine expert/restaurateur Greg Malouf. Unbeknown to them, they already picked the teams when they rode on the camels. They would get ideas from a banquet lunch at the resort prepared by Malouf. Tim and Leo won the team challenge despite the blue team finishing early.
16	"Episode 16"	21 September 2015
The top 4 faces a pressure test where they are cooking in Rhodes W1 for Masterchef UK judge and restaurateur Gary Rhodes. Leo was saved from elimination despite leaving the fat on the lamb for the main course. Glenda was eliminated for her dry and under-seasoned Welsh Rarebit and for losing the team challenge. It was also announced that Dubai tourism also offered return business-class tickets for Dubai Food Festival plus a week of accommodation in February, 2016.
