= Donna Hay =

Australian food stylist (born 1970)

Donna Hay OAM
- Born: 28 January 1970 (age 56); Sydney, New South Wales, Australia
- Occupations: Food stylist; author; magazine editor in chief; homewares retailer; television presenter and judge
- Years active: 2001–present

Donna Hay (born 28 January 1970) is an Australian food stylist, author, magazine and newspaper editor, businesswoman and television presenter, who has presented her own programs

== Cookbooks and publishing ==
Hay is best known as the author of 27 bestselling cookbooks, including the new easy, the new classics, fresh and light, fast, fresh, simple, off the shelf, modern classics (books 1 and 2), the instant cook, "Basics to Brilliance" and Basics to Brilliance: Kids. Selling over 6 million copies worldwide, her books are known for their simple recipes and beautiful photography. She was named one of the 'Magnificent Seven' cookbook authors by the judges of the Gourmand World Cookbook Awards in January 2007. Her most recent book, Too Easy, was released in October 2024.

Hay also served as Editor-in-Chief of Donna Hay Magazine, a bi-monthly magazine launched in 2001, which closed after 100 issues in July 2018. She was the Food Editor for Marie Claire magazine when it launched in Australia, as well as six months as Food Editor at The Age and The Sydney Morning Herald.

== Homewares collection ==
She also has her own homewares range, sold via her online store at donnahay.com.

== Television presenter and appearances ==
In March 2011, Hay's first television series, Fast, Fresh, Simple, launched on The LifeStyle Channel. Fast, Fresh, Simple is a 13-part series that features many of the recipes from her book of the same name.

Donna has also appeared many times as a guest judge on MasterChef Australia, which airs on Network Ten.

In May 2016 her new TV series called "Donna Hay – Basics to Brilliance" aired on Lifestyle Food, Foxtel, followed by "Basics to Brilliance: Kids" in 2017.

In November 2022 a new 4-part series "Donna Hay Christmas" launched globally on Disney+.

== Honours and recognition ==
Hay was awarded the Medal of the Order of Australia (OAM) in the 2022 Queen's Birthday Honours for "service to the food and hospitality sector as a cook and author".

== Filmography ==
Title	Year	Role
Kath and Kim (TV series)	2007	As herself (guest)
MasterChef New Zealand (TV series)	2010	Guest Judge
The Project (TV series)	2010	Self - New Masterchef Celebrity Chef Challenge Judge
Junior MasterChef Australia	2010	Self - Guest Judge
Donna Hay - Fast, Fresh, Simple 13-part series (TV series)	2011	Host
Masterchef Australia (TV series)	2009-2011	Self - Guest Chef - Self Guest Judge - Celebrity Chef (14 episodes)
Donna Hay: Basics to Brilliance (TV series)	2016-2017	Self - Host
Donna Hay: Basics to Brilliance Kids (TV series)	2017	Self - Host
RTL Late Night (TV series)	2018	Self
Saturday Kitchen (TV series)	2007-2020	
Donna Hay Christmas (TV miniseries) Disney+	2022	Self - Host
