= Fix & Fogg =

New Zealand peanut butter brand

- Founded: 2014
- Founder: Andrea Jewell; Roman Jewell
- Headquarters: Wellington, New Zealand

Fix & Fogg is a Wellington-based peanut butter manufacturer in New Zealand. It was founded by husband and wife Roman and Andrea Jewell in 2014.

== History ==
Fix & Fogg was started by husband and wife Roman and Andrea Jewell. The two met in 2006 when they were doing a master's in law. Roman had a New Year's resolution in 2013 that year that he "wanted to become more horizontally skilled as opposed to highly skilled, which was a big focus of the legal profession". This led him to play around in several areas, including bee keeping and pottery, and led into making peanut butter. The project was commercialised in 2014, forming the company Fix & Fogg, with their first peanut butter being sold at a farmer's market in Wellington in August 2013. It was named after Detective Fix and Phileas Fogg from the novel Around the World in Eighty Days.

In 2015 the Smoke and Fire flavour became a finalist in the New Zealand Food Award, but did not receive an award. In early 2018 the company started selling on Amazon, and in 2021 Whole Foods Market in the United States. A factory was opened in Texas in 2020. In 2019 Fix & Fogg partnered with the craft brewery Behemoth to create chocolate peanut butter flavoured imperial stout named The Fix.

In 2018, Fix & Fogg donated 96 kg of peanut butter to Predator Free New Zealand for use in baiting traps, after trappers reported that pests seemed particularly drawn to the smell of this brand of peanut butter. At Hastings Golf Club in 2025, trappers reported that they were having increased success by using Fix & Fogg peanut butter instead of other brands.

Since 2022 there has been a sculpture of a pigeon with its head in a peanut butter jar at Wellington's Aro Park, where the idea for Fix & Fogg came about. It is part of a series of pigeon sculptures in the city dedicated to local businesses.

In 2024, Fix & Fogg peanut butter was sent to the International Space Station after an astronaut asked for it to be brought up there. The company spent about six to seven months collaborating with NASA to make a pouch suitable for space, and ended up becoming the first New Zealand food company to send their food into space.
