= MasterChef New Zealand =

- The MasterChef New Zealand Logo for the first six series
- Also known as: Masterchef NZ
- Genre: Reality television; Cooking show
- Created by: Franc Roddam
- Judges: Ross Burden (series 1); Ray McVinnie (series 1–5); Simon Gault (series 1–5); Josh Emett (series 2–6); Al Brown (series 6); Mark Wallbank (series 6); Nadia Lim (series 7); Vaughan Mabee (series 7); Michael P Dearth (series 7)
- Opening theme: "Here I Come" by Cindy Ruakere (series 1-5); "Kings & Queens" by Brooke Fraser (series 6)
- Country of origin: New Zealand
- Original language: English
- No. of series: 7
- No. of episodes: 97

Production
- Production location: Auckland
- Running time: 60–90 minutes
- Production companies: Imagination Television (2010-2015); Screentime NZ and Discovery NZ (2022-present)

Original release
- Network: TV One (series 1–5); TV3 (series 6-present)
- Release: 3 February 2010 – present

MasterChef New Zealand is a New Zealand competitive reality television cooking show based on the original British version of MasterChef.

The first episode aired on 3 February 2010 at 7:30pm on TV One. Throughout its history, the show has featured judges Ross Burden, Ray McVinnie, Simon Gault, Josh Emett, Al Brown and Mark Wallbank.

The series is similar to the format of MasterChef Australia, whereby contestants compete in weekly elimination challenges, both individually and in teams. The major difference is the number of episodes per week: the New Zealand series only had two episodes, in contrast to Australia's six.

The first series was won by Brett McGregor, over runner-up Kelly Young, in the grand finale which was screened on 28 April 2010. Nadia Lim won the second series, beating runner-up Jax Hamilton in the finale. The third series was won by Chelsea Winter, who beat runner-up Ana Schwarz in the finale. Series four was won by Aaron Brunet, and series five by sister duo Karena and Kasey Bird.

In October 2014, TVNZ announced it had axed the show, after 5 seasons. Later that month, TV3 announced that it would take up the format in 2015. In October 2015, TV3 announced that MasterChef New Zealand would not be returning in 2016.

In November 2021, TV3 announced Masterchef NZ would return after a six-year hiatus.

== Format ==
At the beginning of the series, a large number of hopeful contestants from across New Zealand individually audition by presenting a dish of their choosing to the judges in order to gain one of the 24 places. Entrants must be aged 18 or over, and must be a New Zealand or Australian citizen or permanent resident, or holder of a New Zealand residence class visa. They cannot hold a formal catering qualification gained in the last ten years, cannot have worked in a professional or semi-professional kitchen (if the work was only part-time or for education, then only in the past 15 years), and cannot have been convicted of a serious crime.

== Series summary ==
Series	Start	Finish	Winner	Runner-up	Judges		
1	3 February 2010	28 April 2010	Brett McGregor	Kelly Young	Simon Gault	Ray McVinnie	Ross Burden
2	20 February 2011	15 May 2011	Nadia Lim	Jax Hamilton	Simon Gault	Ray McVinnie	Josh Emett
3	21 February 2012	12 June 2012	Chelsea Winter	Ana Schwarz	Simon Gault	Ray McVinnie	Josh Emett
4	10 February 2013	2 June 2013	Aaron Brunet	Paula Saengthian-ngam	Simon Gault	Ray McVinnie	Josh Emett
5	2 February 2014	4 May 2014	Karena & Kasey Bird	Bec Stanley & Jaimie Stodler	Simon Gault	Ray McVinnie	Josh Emett
6	26 July 2015	28 September 2015	Tim Read	Leo Fernandez	Al Brown	Mark Wallbank	Josh Emett
7	29 May 2022	17 July 2022	Sam Low	Elliot McClymont	Michael P Dearth	Nadia Lim	Vaughan Mabee

== Series 2 ==
The second series was filmed in September 2010 and started airing on 20 February 2011. Series 2 saw the induction of Josh Emett to the judging panel, replacing series one judge Ross Burden. Jax Hamilton and Nadia Lim competed in the grand finale, which was screened on 15 May 2011. Nadia became New Zealand's second MasterChef, by beating Jax 88 points to 75.

== Series 3 ==
The third series was filmed from November 2011 and started airing on 21 February 2012. This series increased the number of contestants from 12 to 16, and the number of episodes from 12-13 to 16-17. The winner was Chelsea Winter, who beat Ana Schwarz 77 points to 72.

== Series 4 ==
The fourth series premiered on 21 February 2013, with chefs Simon Gault, Ray McVinnie, Josh Emett again acting as the series judges.

== Series 5 ==
The fifth series premiered on 2 February 2014, with chefs Simon Gault, Ray McVinnie, Josh Emett again acting as the series judges. Unlike previous series, competitors competed in duos.

== Series 6 ==
The sixth series premiered on 26 July 2015 on TV3, with Al Brown and Mark Wallbank joining returning judge Josh Emett on the judging panel. Included in the prizes was a cookbook deal, a Skoda car, a knife-set, and also working as a chef and menu-planner under season 2 winner Nadia Lim's healthy eating company, My Food Bag. On episode 16, it was also announced that Dubai tourism also offered a return business-class ticket for Dubai Food Festival plus a week of accommodation in February, 2016.

== Series 7 ==
In November 2021, Discovery announced that MasterChef New Zealand would be returning for a seventh season in 2022 - applications were opened for casting. No further details on judges or format was announced. The judges were announced in April 2022. They are season 2 winner, Nadia Lim, Vaughan Mabee, and Michael P Dearth. The series premiered on 29 May 2022.
