= MasterChef New Zealand series 4 =

MasterChef New Zealand
- Series 4
- No. of episodes: 17

Release
- Original network: TV One
- Original release: February 21 – May 26, 2013

Season chronology
- ← Previous; Series 3 Next → Series 5

The fourth series of MasterChef New Zealand was on air from 21 February 2013, with the chefs Simon Gault, Ray McVinnie, Josh Emett again acting as the series judges. The season was won by Aaron Brunet, narrowly beating runner-up Paula Saengthian-ngam by 75 points to 74.

== Contestants ==
| Contestant | Age | Hometown | Occupation | Rank |
|---|---|---|---|---|
| Susanne Huber | 48 | Austria/Auckland | Hospitality Manager | 16th |
| Serena Edwards | 49 | Auckland | Lecturer | 15th |
| Raheel Kerr | 27 | Wellsford | Student | 14th |
| Michael Gin | 23 | Oamaru | Student | 13th |
| Corinna Jewanski | 37 | Germany/Paekākāriki | Vintage Shop Owner | 12th |
| Kris Matthews | 31 | Warkworth | Builder | 11th |
| David Jamieson | 35 | Wellington | Bartender | 10th |
| Dana Leaming | 22 | Wellington | Student | 9th |
| Jennis Hayes | 24 | Auckland | Technology Teacher | 8th |
| Eliott Brookes | 39 | Wellington | Sports Coordinator | 7th |
| Sushil Ravikumar | 27 | Wellington | IT Specialist | 6th |
| Ella Krauts | 19 | Drury | Student | 5th |
| Vanessa Baxter | 45 | Auckland | Stay-at-home Mom | 4th |
| Kelly Kaihea | 27 | Auckland | Interior Designer | 3rd |
| Paula Saengthian-ngam | 35 | Nelson | Stay-at-home Mom | 2nd |
| Aaron Brunet | 42 | Raglan | IT Consultant | 1st |

== Elimination table ==
| No. | Order | Episode | | | | | | | | | | | | | | |
| No. | Order | 3 | 4 | 5 | 6 | 7 | 8 | 9 | 10 | 11 | 12 | 13 | 14 | 15 | 16 | 17 |
|---|---|---|---|---|---|---|---|---|---|---|---|---|---|---|---|---|
| 1 | Aaron | WIN | WIN | WIN | WIN | LOSE | WIN | IN | IN | WIN | LOW | WIN | WIN | IN | WIN | WINNER |
| 2 | Paula | LOW | IN | IN | WIN | WIN | IN | IN | WIN | WIN | IN | IN | IN | WIN | IN | RUNNER-UP |
| 3 | Kelly | WIN | IN | IN | IN | WIN | IN | WIN | LOW | LOW | WIN | IN | WIN | IN | ELIM | |
| 4 | Vanessa | LOSE | IN | WIN | IN | WIN/LOW | IN | IN | IN | LOW | IN | LOW | LOW | ELIM | | |
| 5 | Ella | LOSE | WIN | WIN | IN | LOSE | IN | IN | LOW | WIN | WIN | WIN | ELIM | | | |
| 6 | Sushil | LOW | LOW | IN | WIN | WIN | LOW | IN | IN | WIN | LOW | ELIM | | | | |
| 7 | Eliott | WIN | IN | IN | LOW | WIN | WIN | IN | IN | LOW | ELIM | | | | | |
| 8 | Jennis | WIN | IN | WIN | WIN | LOSE | IN | WIN | IN | ELIM | | | | | | |
| 9 | Dana | WIN | IN | IN | WIN | LOSE | LOW | LOW | ELIM | | | | | | | |
| 10 | David | LOSE | IN | LOW | WIN | LOSE | IN | ELIM | | | | | | | | |
| 11 | Kris | LOSE | IN | LOW | LOW | WIN | ELIM | | | | | | | | | |
| 12 | Corinna | WIN | IN | IN | IN | ELIM | | | | | | | | | | |
| 13 | Michael | WIN | IN | IN | ELIM | | | | | | | | | | | |
| 14 | Raheel | WIN | IN | ELIM | | | | | | | | | | | | |
| 15 | Serena | LOSE | ELIM | | | | | | | | | | | | | |
| 16 | Susanne | ELIM | | | | | | | | | | | | | | |

This contestant won the competition
This contestant was the runner-up
This contestant won the elimination challenge
This contestant was in the winning team
This contestant was in the bottom group
This contestant was eliminated

== Episodes ==
| No. | Title | Original release date | Viewers |
|---|---|---|---|
| 1 | "Episode 1" | February 10, 2013 | 594,940 |
This episode introduces those people who ended up entering MasterChef.
| 2 | "Episode 2" | February 17, 2013 | 486,540 |
The second entering MasterChef.
| 3 | "Episode 3" | February 24, 2013 | 542,010 |
Contestants were split into four teams and given a team hangi challenge on Mokoia Island, where guest chef Rex Morgan joined the judges. The Yellow (Aaron, Jennis, Corinna and Raheel) and Green (Dana, Eliott, Michael and Kelly) teams were declared winners, with the Red team (Ella, Kris, Susanne and Sushil) being the worst performers as a result of their bland-tasting hangi. The worst performer on the Red team, and therefore the first person eliminated from the competition, was Susanne Huber with her "glue-like" silverbeet stuffing.
| 4 | "Episode 4" | March 3, 2013 | 548,360 |
Each contestant was given the challenge of making a "Mexican-inspired dish". Jose Carlos de la Macorra of Mexican Specialties was the guest judge. Aaron and Ella were the top two, with Simon Gault describing Aaron as a "rock star". Sushil and Serena ended up in the bottom two. Sushil delivered a dish that Simon described as "more taco hell than Taco Bell" because of his avocado milkshake. Serena's dish "didn't give us Mexico at all," resulting in her being the second contestant to be eliminated this series.
| 5 | "Episode 5" | March 10, 2013 | 579,520 |
Contestants were given a mystery box challenge including a whole Pekin duck. The top four chefs were Aaron, Ella, Jennis and Vanessa, who won an 11-course dinner at the chef's table at Euro restaurant. David, Kris and Raheel were in the bottom three and faced a 30-minute challenge to decide who would be eliminated. Controversially, Raheel declared that she didn't know if she wanted to be in the competition anymore. After the elimination challenge (consisting of cooking a piece of salmon, preparing a rack of lamb and making pesto), Raheel was judged to be the third contestant eliminated from the competition.
| 6 | "Episode 6" | March 17, 2013 | 536,340 |
Contestants were given a challenge to play "the last supper game" - to make the last meal they'd eat on the last day of their life and the situation they'd eat it in. Judges commented on the high quality of the completed dishes. Aaron, Dana, David, Jennis, Paula and Sushil were judged the top six and won a dining experience with chef Ben Bayly at The Grove restaurant. The bottom three were Eliott, Kris and Michael. Michael's incomplete glutinous rice balls dish resulted in his becoming the fourth contestant to be eliminated from the competition: Michael had promised "glutinous balls in three different ways" but he completed only two.
| 7 | "Episode 7" | March 24, 2013 | 487,050 |
Aboard the Dawn Princess cruise ship, contestants were split into two self-decided teams and given the challenge to cook menu items for the ship's 1800 passengers, with Princess Cruises Master Chef Alfredo Marzi as the guest judge. The blue team (Paula, Sushil, Eliott, Kelly, Kris and Vanessa) was judged to be the best, with Sushil the overall winner. Corinna and Vanessa were judged the poorest performers on each team and were given a cook-off challenge to make whitebait fritters. Corinna's burnt egg white fritters saw her become the fifth contestant to be eliminated from the competition.
| 8 | "Episode 8" | March 31, 2013 | 429,520 |
Contestants were given a fish identification test. For the main challenge, the winner of the fish test, Aaron, was rewarded with the right to choose which cut of pork the other contestants would receive to cook. Aaron strategically picked pigs trotters for David, his biggest competition. Aaron and Elliot were judged the top two contestants, with David being highly commended. Kris, Sushil and Dana were in the bottom three, with Kris finally eliminated for his underseasoned dish.
| 9 | "Episode 9" | April 7, 2013 | 562,590 |
Joined by guest judge Natalie Oldfield of Dulcie May Kitchen, contestants were given a baking challenge. Using a Dulcie May recipe, contestants had to bake a sponge cake then fill and decorate it in a style of their choice. Jennis and her spiced sponge and Kelly and her strawberry and raspberry sponge were declared the winners of the challenge. While Dana's messy, overwhelming sponge and David's vinegary sponge saw them in the bottom two. It was David's strawberry, balsamic vinegar and basil cake filling that saw him eliminated.
| 10 | "Episode 10" | April 14, 2013 | 552,390 |
Contestants randomly selected a Jetstar travel destination and a corresponding iconic dish to cook, with Jetstar Australia and New Zealand CEO David Hall joining the judging panel. Eliott (Australian seafood stew), Paula (pad Thai), Sushil (Fijian chicken, tomato and potato curry) and Vanessa (Creole jambalaya) were judged to have made the top dishes. Paula was the ultimate winner, rewarded with tickets to her cuisine destination of Thailand. Dana, Ella and Kelly were in the bottom three, with Dana's salty, bitter, "inedible" Japanese soup ultimately resulting in her being the eight contestant eliminated.
| 11 | "Episode 11" | April 21, 2013 | 552,220 |
Contestants were flown to Dolphin Island in Fiji and given a creation challenge. Cooking in pre-selected order based on the results of a crab race, contestants had to cook a seafood dish using Fijian produce. Rudy Crane of Huka Retreats joined the chef judges, and Huka Retreats executive chef Michel Louws supervised and scored the contestants in the kitchen. Aaron, Ella, Paula and Sushil were scored the top four contestants, with Kelly, Elliot, Vanessa and Jennis the bottom four. Ultimately it was Jennis' bland dish that saw her score 11 points, making her the ninth contestants to be eliminated.
| 12 | "Episode 12" | April 28, 2013 | 494,060 |
Joined by guest judge chef Martin Bosley, contestants were given the challenge of cooking a turduckenqua - a quail inside a chicken inside a duck inside a turkey, along with a vegetable and sauce accompaniment. The female contestants all cooked good dishes, with Ella and Kelly judged the top two and rewarded with a dining experience at Martin Bosley's restaurant in Wellington. The three male contestants were in the bottom, with Eliott's dry, burnt turduckenqua making him the 10th contestant to be eliminated.
| 13 | "Episode 13" | May 5, 2013 | 467,670 |
Contestants visited Wither Hills vineyard in Marlborough. They were given the challenge of cooking a signature dish on a barbecue grill that captured the essence of Marlborough and matched a randomly selected bottle of Wither Hills wine. Aaron and Ella's dishes were judged to be best, with Vanessa and Sushil's dishes judged "equally as bad as each other". Unable to choose the worst contestant based on their dish, Sushil was eliminated as judges felt Vanessa had more to offer.
| 14 | "Episode 14" | May 12, 2013 | 395,500 |
Joined by chef Andrew Brown of The George restaurant in Christchurch, contestants were given a dessert challenge - to recreate Brown's reconstructed lemon meringue pie and create a sparkling wine cocktail to match. Aaron and Kelly were judged to have made the top desserts, with Ella and Vanessa in the bottom two. Ella and Vanessa were given an elimination challenge of making a fruit crumble. Both crumbles were judged to be excellent, however Ella was eliminated as hers was slightly drier than Vanessa's.
| 15 | "Episode 15" | May 19, 2013 | 414,999 |
Chef Ben Bayly of the Grove restaurant joined the final four for an invention challenge with no limits. Paula's green curry was judged to be the best. It was Vanessa's undercooked leg of duck that saw her eliminated from the contest.
| 16 | "Episode 16" | May 26, 2013 | N/A |
The final three were given the challenge of recreating two dishes each from the French Cafe's six-course degustation menu, with chef Simon Wright as a guest judge. Aaron was judged the winner of the day, but it was Kelly's overuse of crème fraîche that saw her eliminated from the contest.

== MasterChef MasterClass ==
From week eight, the companion show MasterChef MasterClass was broadcast each week. It featured a weekly cooking class where the remaining contestants sat in on lessons from the judges and guest chefs.

- Episode 1 (30 March 2013) – At Kauri Cliffs resort in Northland, Josh Emett and Simon Gault are joined by executive chef Dale Gartland.
