= Garage Project =

Brewery in Wellington, New Zealand

- Type: Private
- Industry: Brewery
- Founded: 2011; 15 years ago in Wellington, New Zealand
- Founders: Pete Gillespie, Jos Ruffell, Ian Gillespie
- Website: garageproject.co.nz

Garage Project is an independent New Zealand brewery based in Aro Valley, Wellington. The brewery was founded in 2011 by brothers Ian and Pete Gillespie and Jos Ruffell. They turned a dilapidated car garage in the Aro Valley first to brewing 50 litres at a time, expanding over the years to a busy brewery producing many different styles. The 24/24 project (24 beers in 24 weeks) that the brewery launched with in 2011 produced many beers that are still in production - Pernicious Weed, Aro Noir,Venusian Pale Ale, Cockswain's Courage, Hāpi Daze, Biére de Garage, Red Rocks, Golden Brown, Hellbender, Trip Hop, Summer Sommer, and Rum & Raisin.

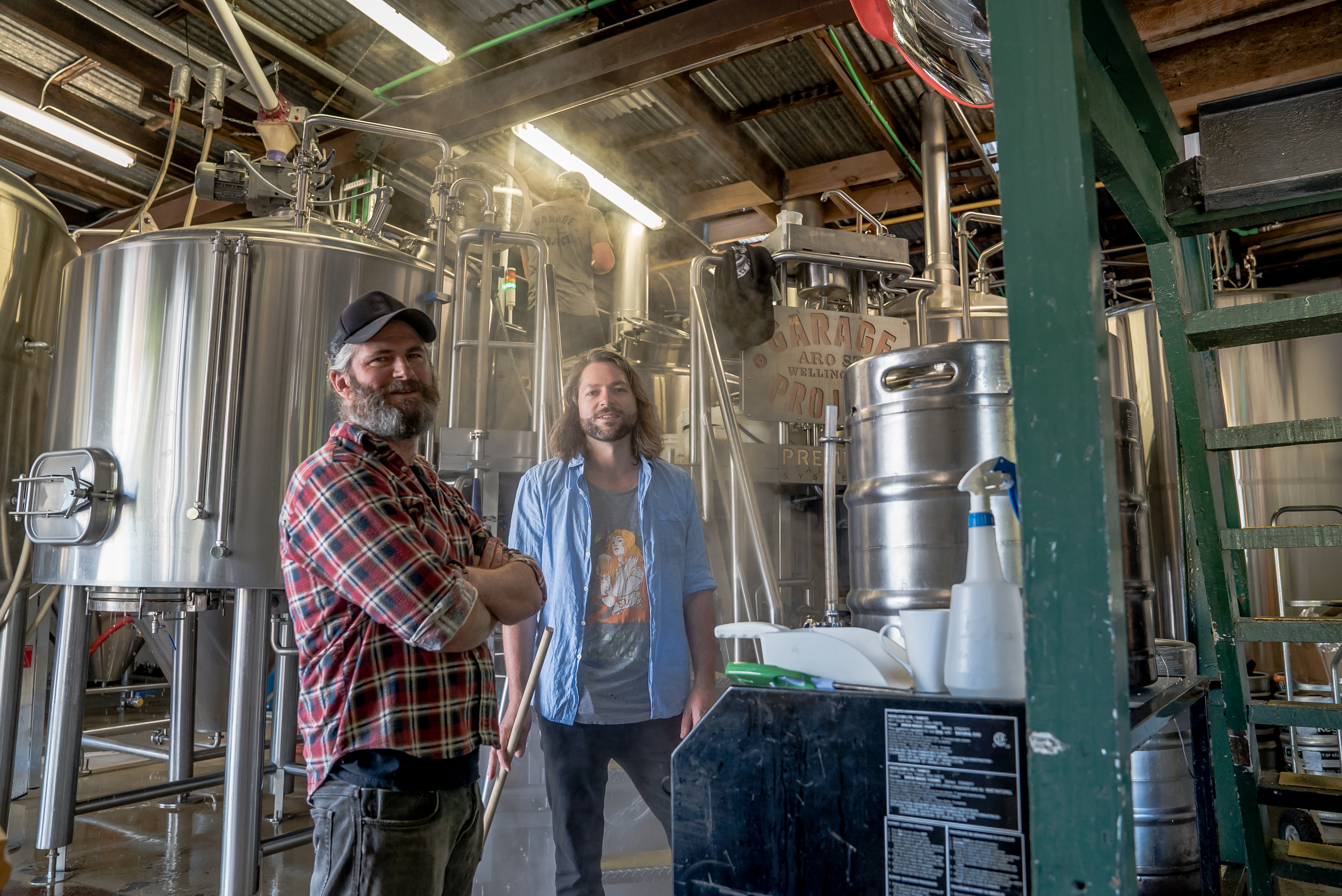
Pete Gillespie and Jos Ruffell

Garage Project is known for innovation, creativity and collaboration with artists, and to date has created over 1000 different beers.

The brewery has grown considerably since 2011, winning the Deloitte Fast 50 in 2015 with over 660% annual growth, and distribution in New Zealand, Australia, Norway, United Kingdom, Europe and China.

In 2015, Garage Project established a Cellar Door and Taproom in their Aro Valley, Wellington site, a mixed fermentation and barrel location in central Wellington dubbed the "Wild Workshop", a bar and cellar door in Kingsland, Auckland, and most recently took ownership of a central Wellington pub on Leeds St. In 2017 Garage Project announced a partnership with brew house bStudio in the Hawkes Bay. In 2026, Garage Project acquired full ownership of bStudio.

Garage Project has won numerous awards; in the 2018 GABS Hottest 100 Kiwi Craft Beers poll, Garage Project claimed 19 spots, including #2 for Death from Above, #3 for Pernicious Weed, and #5 for Party & Bullshit. They were named NZ Brewery of the Year in 2017 by the New Zealand Brewers Guild Awards, edging out 111 other breweries and claiming 26 medals. At the same awards, they took out the title Large Brewery of the Year in 2021, 2022, 2023 and 2025. The brewery has received international recognition; various vintages of their annual release Chance, Luck & Magic have received medals at the prestigious World Beer Cup, along with their beer Engeltjes Pis, both brews from their Wild Workshop brewery.

Garage Project currently hold all ten spots in the top ten highest rated beers on New Zealand's Untappd. The list is topped by Sunrise Valley, a cult-favourite hazy IPA brewed with hops grown on a specific farm in the Nelson region.

For a period from 2017, Garage Project produced natural wines under a sub-brand called GP Crushed, made at their central Wellington brewery location. The initial launch featured four wines: a Riesling bottled mid-fermentation and spiked with Lactobacillus, a 100% Brettanomyces fermented New Zealand Chardonnay, a Pinot Noir that has undergone carbonic maceration before being spiked with Brett, and a Sauvignon/Semillon blend that has been bottled pét-nat. The brewery stopped producing these wines in 2022.

Garage Project's Hāpi Daze pale ale was served aboard Singapore Airlines flights to and from New Zealand for a period.
