= Ross Burden =

New Zealand chef

Ross Kelvin Burden
- Born: 16 December 1968; Napier, New Zealand
- Died: 17 July 2014 (aged 45); Auckland, New Zealand
- Known for: Celebrity chef

Ross Kelvin Burden (16 December 1968 – 17 July 2014) was a celebrity chef from New Zealand. His early career was as a model and he became a chef later in life, using cooking skills learned from his grandmother.

== Career ==
Burden's professional television career began after he reached the final of the BBC series MasterChef 1993. He frequently appeared on Ready Steady Cook for eight years, filmed a healthy-eating video with Joan Collins, and made at least five series for Taste.

Burden published two books and wrote columns for two magazines. In May 2006, he appeared on The X Factor: Battle of the Stars along with fellow chefs Jean-Christophe Novelli, Aldo Zilli and Paul Rankin. In 2010, Burden judged the first season of MasterChef New Zealand with Simon Gault and Ray McVinnie.

== Personal life and death ==
Burden was born in Napier, New Zealand, and brought up there, attending Taradale High School. He studied at the University of Auckland, supporting himself with work as a model, and graduated with a degree in zoology. A self-taught cook, Burden hosted and was a guest on programmes across the world. He was once voted one of the UK's most eligible bachelors. He was gay.

Burden died in Auckland on 17 July 2014 of an infection relating to treatment for leukaemia. In November 2014, it was revealed that Burden had died of Legionnaires' disease due to the infected water supply in the hospital.
