= Josh Emett =

New Zealand chef

- Born: 6 July 1973 (age 53); Hamilton, New Zealand
- Culinary career
- Cooking style: French/European, Malaysian\
- Rating
- Michelin stars
- Current restaurants
- Onslow, Gilt Brasserie, The Oyster Inn
- Television show
- MasterChef New Zealand
- Website: joshemett.com

Josh Emett is a chef from New Zealand. He is co-owner of Onslow restaurant at 9 Princes St Auckland, The Oyster Inn on Waiheke Island and most recently Gilt Brasserie in Auckland with his wife Helen. He was the co-founder of Rata restaurant in Queenstown and restaurant chain Go-To Collection which includes Madam Woo, and Hawker and Roll. Emett worked for Gordon Ramsay for over 10 years, and has been a judge on MasterChef New Zealand.

== Early life ==
Emett grew up on a farm outside of Hamilton, New Zealand in Ngāhinapōuri. He attended (the now former) Melville High School. He completed his chef training at Te Pūkenga-WINTEC Culinary School (formerly known as the Waikato Polytechnic).

== Career ==
After finishing his studies Emett worked for a short time in Auckland, New Zealand at Cin Cin on Quay before setting off overseas, where he worked at Coast restaurant in Mayfair, London, with Steven Terry. His next move took him to Australia where he worked at one of Melbourne’s most highly regarded restaurants, Est Est Est under Donovan Cooke.

In 1999 he headed to South France, where he worked on luxury yachts. He then moved to London and made contact with Gordon Ramsay, whom Cooke had introduced him to. He went on to work with Ramsay for ten years at Restaurant Gordon Ramsay, Claridge’s and the Savoy Grill in London, and then overseas to New York, Los Angeles and Melbourne.

In 2011 Emett left Gordon Ramsay Holdings and opened his first restaurant, Rata, in Queenstown with his business partner Fleur Caulton. A few years later they opened Madam Woo, a casual Malaysian restaurant also in Queenstown. Its huge success has seen them open three more outposts since. In 2017 Emett’s team diversified and opened Hawker and Roll, a fast casual spin-off of Madam Woo which now has three sites across New Zealand.

In 2013 Emett was appointed food director at Ostro, a stylish high-end brasserie in Auckland’s Britomart district.

In 2019, Madam Woo in Dunedin closed due to ongoing labour shortages, and in May 2020 the Christchurch location closed due to financial viability concerns during the COVID-19 outbreak.

In 2020, Josh and his wife Helen opened Onslow, a restaurant located in Auckland. Also in 2020 they purchased The Oyster Inn, a bistro and boutique hotel on Waiheke Island.

In October 2023, Josh and his wife Helen opened Gilt Brasserie in Auckland's historic Chancery Chambers Building.

== Brand Ambassador ==
Emett has been an ambassador for BMW since 2012 and Nespresso since 2017. He was also the Strategic Advisor for food and beverage at Craggy Range.

== Television appearances ==
Emett was a judge for five seasons of MasterChef New Zealand and a guest chef on MasterChef Australia. He also appeared in season one of Chopped USA and on Hell’s Kitchen as a guest chef.

== Awards ==
StarChefs New York Rising Star, 2009 – Hotel Chef.

== Books ==
Cut (2013), Penguin Random House

Josh’s Backyard BBQ (2014), Penguin Random House

The Recipe (2019), Rizzoli New York, Hardie Grant Australia, and Upstart Press.

== Personal life ==
Emett lives in Auckland, New Zealand, with his wife Helen and two sons, Finn and Louis.
