= Chelsea Winter =

New Zealand celebrity chef

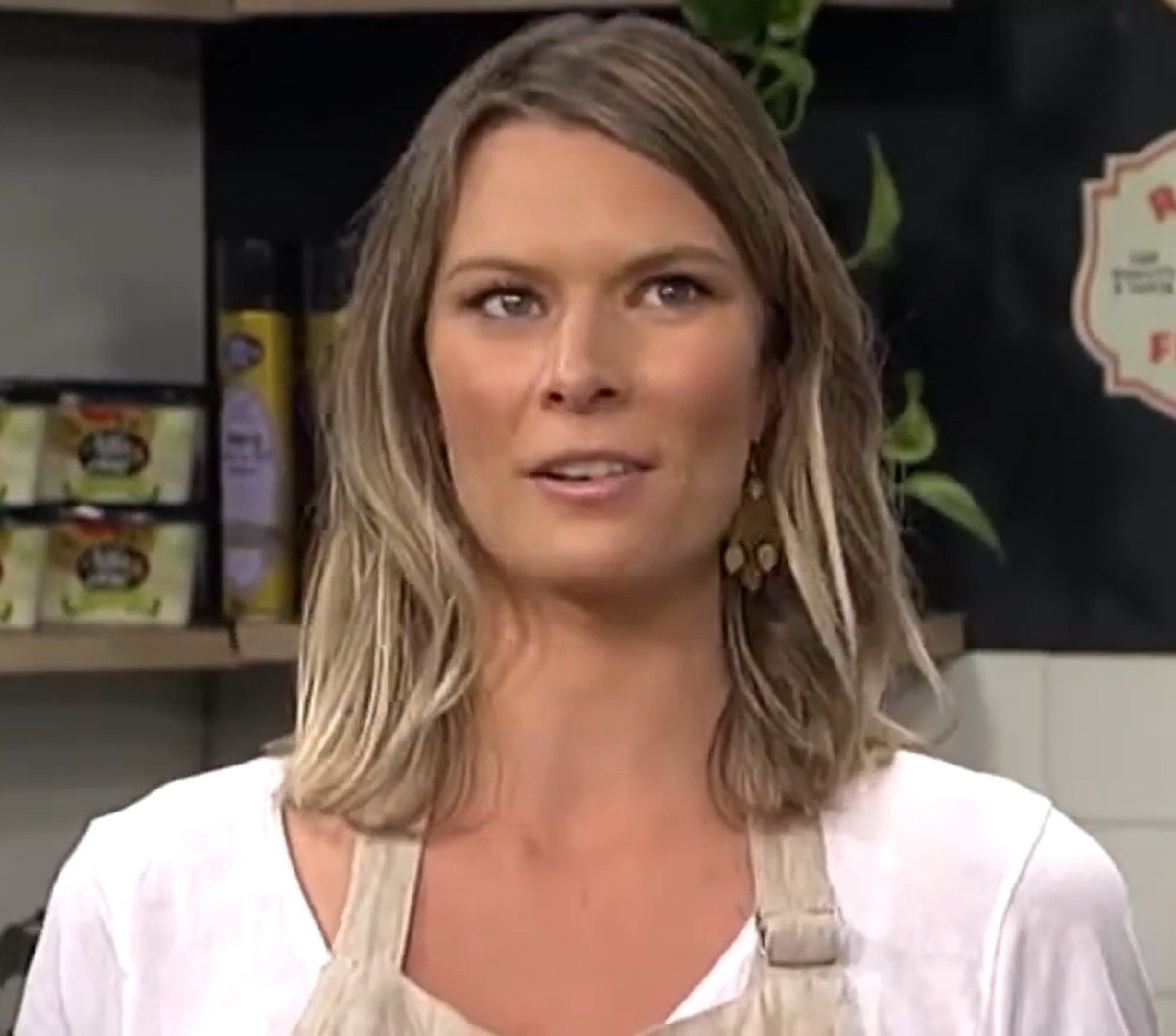
- Winter in 2017
- Born: Chelsea Winter; Hong Kong
- Television: Masterchef NZ
- Partner: N/A
- Children: Sky Winter Sage Winter
- Website: http://chelseawinter.co.nz

Chelsea Winter is a New Zealand celebrity chef, entrepreneur, food writer and television personality. Chelsea's 5th and 6th cookbooks, Eat and Supergood, were both named New Zealand's Number One selling title of the year. Her 7th cookbook, Tasty, was the NZ bestselling overall title of the year for 2024. Chelsea's childhood was spent on farms in Hamilton and Kumeu, and she first became well known after winning the third season (February 21, 2012 – June 12, 2012) of MasterChef New Zealand.

== Cookbooks ==
- At My Table (2013)
- Easy Baking Recipes (2014)
- Everyday Delicious (2014)
- Homemade Happiness (2015)
- Scrumptious (2016)
- Eat (2017)
- Supergood (2020)
- Tasty (2024)
