= Simon Gault =

New Zealand chef

- Style: French cuisine, Health food
- Television: MasterChef New Zealand
- Website: http://www.simongault.com

Simon Gault is a New Zealand celebrity chef, entrepreneur, food writer and television personality, known for appearing as a celebrity chef judge on Masterchef NZ and host of Prime TV's Why Are We Fat? He was the executive chef of Nourish Group and Euro Restaurant. His roles are replaced by Gareth Stewart, who was the head judge for the first season of My Kitchen Rules NZ.
