= Al Brown (chef) =

New Zealand chef and restaurateur

Al Brown MNZM
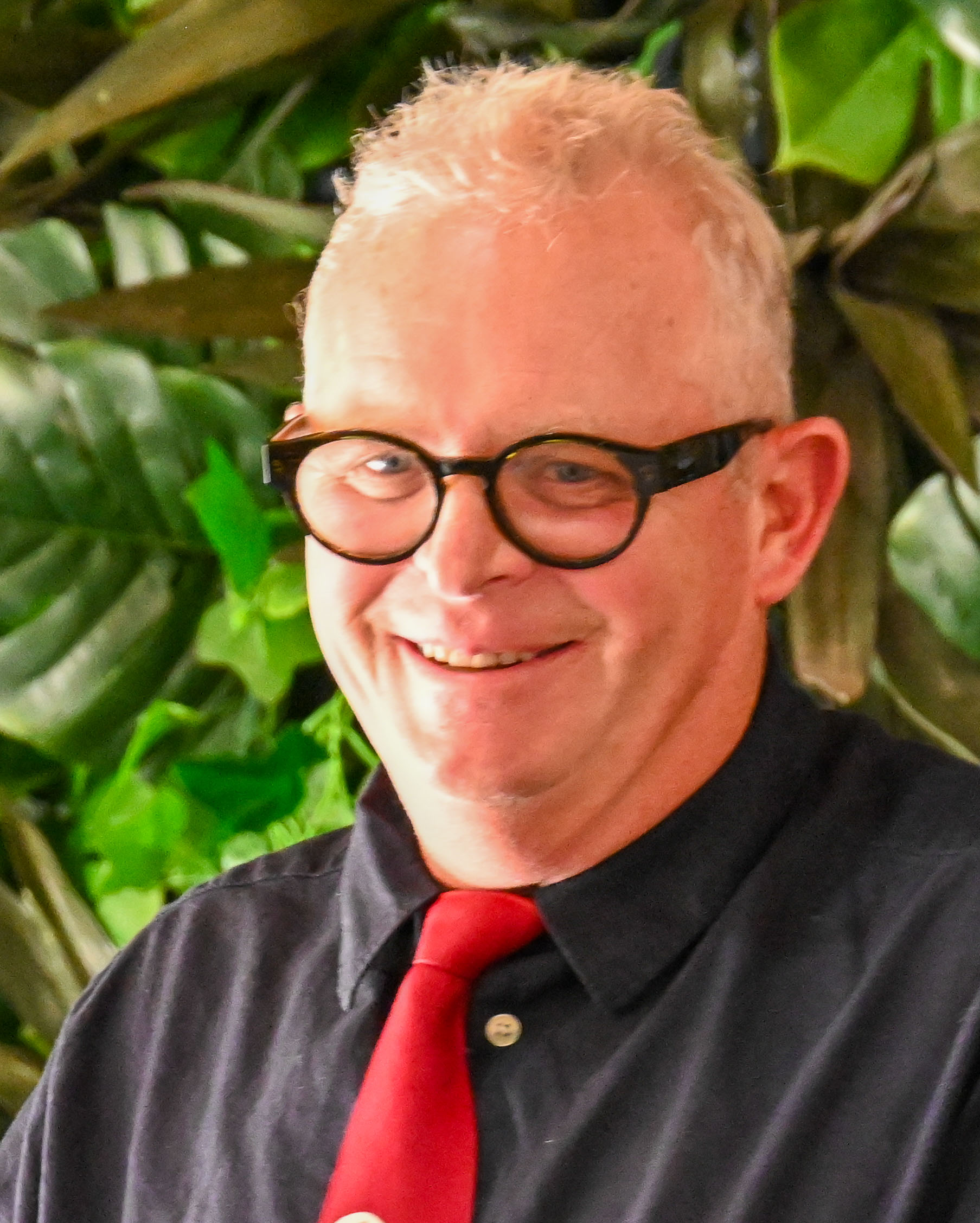
- Al Brown in 2025
- Born: 1964 or 1965 (age 60–61)

Alister Douglas Malcolm Brown (born 1964 or 1965) is a New Zealand chef, restaurateur and television presenter.

== Early life and education ==
Brown grew up on a farm near Masterton, in the Wairarapa. He attended a boarding school and was required to repeat Fifth Form, but was expelled due to "rolling cheap joints". He later described himself as being "hopeless in a traditional classroom environment". After leaving school he became a shepherd in the Hawke's Bay. He later studied at the New England Culinary Institute in the US state of Vermont.

== Career ==
In 1996 he and Steve Logan founded the restaurant Logan Brown, which is located at the Former National Bank of New Zealand Building in Wellington. Brown and Logan presented the television programme Hunger for the Wild from 2006 to 2008 which involved fishing, hunting, foraging and cooking. In 2011 Brown opened Depot Eatery and Oyster Bar at SkyCity in Auckland.

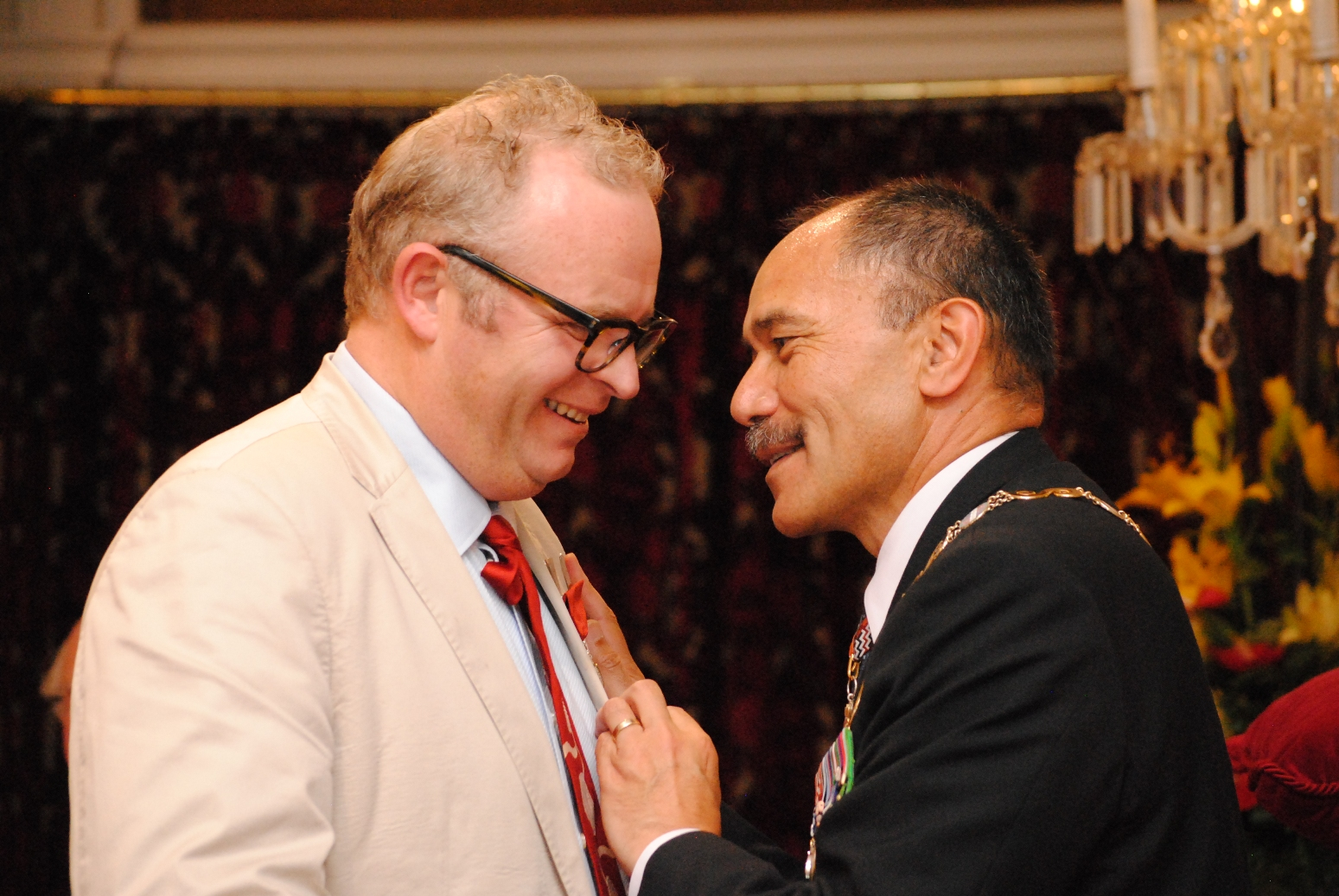
Brown's investiture in 2012

Brown was appointed a Member of The New Zealand Order of Merit in the 2012 Queen's Birthday and Diamond Jubilee Honours, for services as a chef.

Brown was a judge in MasterChef New Zealand series 6 in 2015. In 2025 Brown published the fishing guide book Hooked: Learning to Fish. In 2026 this book was nominated for the Elsie Locke Award for Non-Fiction Finalists in the 2026 NZ Book Awards for Children and Young Adults.

Other books published by him include Depot: Biography of a Restaurant, Stoked and Go Fish. In 2017 the publisher Allen & Unwin reported that over 100,000 copies of Brown's books had been sold.

== Personal life ==
Brown has dyslexia.
