= MasterChef (American TV series) season 12 =

Season of television series

MasterChef: Back to Win
- Season 12
- Promotional poster for season 12, featuring (L to R) judges Aarón Sánchez, Gordon Ramsay, and Joe Bastianich
- Judges: Gordon Ramsay; Aarón Sánchez; Joe Bastianich
- No. of contestants: 20
- Winner: Dara Yu
- Runners-up: Christian Green; Michael Silverstein
- No. of episodes: 20

Release
- Original network: Fox
- Original release: May 25 – September 14, 2022

Season chronology
- ← Previous; Season 11 Next → Season 13

The twelfth season of the American competitive reality television series MasterChef (also known as MasterChef: Back to Win) premiered on Fox on May 25, 2022, and concluded on September 14, 2022. Gordon Ramsay, Aarón Sánchez, and Joe Bastianich all returned as judges.

The season was won by MasterChef Junior season one runner-up Dara Yu, with season five fifth-place finisher Christian Green and season 10 15th-place finisher Michael Silverstein as the runners-up.

== Production ==
On August 18, 2021, it was announced that the series had been renewed for a twelfth season, with judges Ramsay, Sánchez, and Bastianich announced to be returning as well. On April 5, 2022, it was announced that the season would premiere on May 25, 2022.

== Contestants ==
The season featured 20 returning former MasterChef contestants, including two former MasterChef Junior contestants who competed as adults.

Sources for all contestants and previous seasons: Ages are as shown in graphics on the show.

Contestant	Age	Hometown	Previous Season	Previous Season Placing	Status
Dara Yu	20	Los Angeles, California	1 (Junior)	2nd	Winner September 14
Christian Green	36	New Orleans, Louisiana	5	5th	Runners-up September 14
Michael Silverstein	34	Pittsburgh, Pennsylvania	10	15th	Runners-up September 14
Shanika Patterson	38	Miami, Florida	9	8th	Eliminated September 7
Emily Hallock	31	Neenah, Wisconsin	9	10th	Eliminated September 7
Willie Mike	33	Houston, Texas	5	7th	Eliminated August 31
Amanda Saab	32	Seattle, Washington	6	13th	Eliminated August 31
Derrick (Peltz) Fox	35	Fort Myers, Florida	6	2nd	Eliminated August 31
Bowen Li	29	Tianjin, China	9	5th	Eliminated August 24
Brandi Mudd	33	Irvington, Kentucky	7	2nd	Eliminated August 24
Fred Chang	26	Redondo Beach, California	10	10th	Eliminated August 17
Gabriel Lewis	24	Oklahoma City, Oklahoma	8	7th	Eliminated August 17
Brielle "Bri" Baker	27	Dallas, Texas	10	8th	Eliminated August 10
Shelly Flash	38	Brooklyn, New York	6	9th	Eliminated August 3
Tommy Walton	59	Chicago, Illinois	6	7th	Eliminated July 27
Shayne Wells	18	Spring, Texas	5 (Junior)	3rd	Eliminated July 20
Samantha Daily	23	West Des Moines, Iowa	9	4th	Eliminated July 13
Alejandro Valdivia	40	Atlanta, Georgia	11	4th	Eliminated June 29
Caitlin "Cate" Meade	30	Chicago, Illinois	8	4th	Eliminated June 22
Stephen Lee	54	Palm Springs, California	6	3rd	Eliminated June 15

== Elimination table ==
Place	Contestant	Episode																
Place	Contestant	4	5	6	7	8	9	10	11	12	13	14	15	16	17	18		19/20
1	Dara	IN	LOW	WIN	IN	IN	WIN	IMM	HIGH	LOW	HIGH	IN	IN	LOW	WIN	WIN	HIGH	WINNER
2	Christian	IN	HIGH	WIN	IN	WIN	IMM	IN	HIGH	IN	IN	WIN	IMM	WIN	WIN	WIN	HIGH	RUNNERS-UP
2	Michael	IN	IN	IN	IN	IN	HIGH	WIN	WIN	IMM	HIGH	LOW	IN	HIGH	IN	LOW	LOW	RUNNERS-UP
4	Shanika	HIGH	IN	IN	IN	IN	IN	IN	IN	WIN	IMM	WIN	IMM	LOW	IN	IN	ELIM	
5	Emily	WIN	IMM	IN	IN	HIGH	IN	IN	LOW	LOW	IN	IN	WIN	HIGH	WIN	ELIM		
6	Willie	HIGH	IN	WIN	IN	IN	IN	IN	IN	IN	LOW	LOW	IN	WIN	ELIM			
7	Amanda	IN	IN	WIN	WIN	IMM	HIGH	IN	IN	IN	IN	IN	HIGH	ELIM				
7	Derrick	IN	IN	WIN	HIGH	IN	IN	WIN	IN	HIGH	WIN	IMM	LOW	ELIM				
9	Bowen	IN	IN	IN	HIGH	LOW	IN	WIN	IN	WIN	IMM	HIGH	ELIM					
10	Brandi	IN	HIGH	WIN	IN	IN	IN	IN	LOW	IN	IN	ELIM						
11	Fred	IN	WIN	IMM	LOW	IN	IN	WIN	IN	LOW	ELIM							
12	Gabriel	LOW	IN	IN	IN	IN	IN	WIN	IN	ELIM								
13	Bri	IN	IN	IN	IN	LOW	LOW	WIN	ELIM									
14	Shelly	IN	IN	WIN	LOW	HIGH	LOW	ELIM										
15	Tommy	LOW	LOW	WIN	IN	IN	ELIM											
16	Shayne	IN	IN	WIN	IN	ELIM												
17	Samantha	IN	IN	IN	ELIM													
18	Alejandro	IN	IN	ELIM														
19	Cate	IN	ELIM															
20	Stephen	ELIM																

(WINNER) This cook won the competition.
(RUNNER-UP) This cook finished as a runner-up in the finals.
(WIN) The cook won the individual challenge (Mystery Box Challenge/Skills Test or Elimination Test).
(WIN) The cook was on the winning team in the Team Challenge and directly advanced to the next round.
(HIGH) The cook was one of the top entries in the individual challenge but didn't win.
(HIGH) The cook was one of the top entries in the Team Challenge.
(IN) The cook wasn't selected as a top or bottom entry in an individual challenge.
(IN) The cook wasn't selected as a top or bottom entry in a team challenge.
(IMM) The cook didn't have to compete in that round of the competition and was safe from elimination.
(IMM) The cook had to compete in that round of the competition but was safe from elimination.
(LOW) The cook was one of the bottom entries in an individual challenge, and was the last person to advance.
(LOW) The cook was one of the bottom entries in the Team Challenge and they advanced.
(ELIM) The cook was eliminated from MasterChef.

== Episodes ==
No. overall	No. in season	Title	Original release date	Prod. code	U.S. viewers (millions)
224	1	"Back to Win - Audition Battles"	May 25, 2022	MC-1201	1.75
The judges invite back former contestants for a second chance to win the competition, with only 20 white aprons being handed out. The winner will receive $250,000 and the trophy, as well as a set of appliances from Viking Range. The contestants will have 45 minutes to prepare a redemption dish in a head-to-head battle. Former runners-up Adrien, Brandi, Derrick, and Natasha compete against each other, and Brandi and Derrick both earn an apron. The second group features season nine alums Emily, Julia, Lindsey and Shanika. Emily and Shanika advance. The next group consists of Amanda, Christian, Lexy, and Wuta. Amanda and Christian also advance.
225	2	"Back to Win - Audition Battles (Part 2)"	June 1, 2022	MC-1202	2.25
The auditions continue with former seventh-place finishers Derrick, Micah, Tommy and Willie. Tommy and Willie earn an apron each. Next, Cate, Daniel, Michael and Sarah cook against each other. Cate and Michael advance. The third group consists of Brien, Bowen, Newton and Stephen. Bowen and Stephen also advance. The last group of the day features MasterChef Junior alums Dara, Shayne and Tae-ho. Dara and Shayne receive the next two aprons.
226	3	"Back to Win - Audition Battles (Part 3)"	June 8, 2022	MC-1203	2.17
The final rounds of the audition commence as Bri, Olivia, Fred, and Felix compete. Bri and Fred earn their aprons. Next, Keturah, Alejandro, Samantha, and Jaimee cook against each other. Alejandro and Samantha advance. The final competing group is Gabriel, Malcolm, Sheetal, and Shelly. Shelly and Gabriel receive their aprons, rounding out the Top 20.
227	4	"Dish That Sent You Home"	June 15, 2022	MC-1204	2.38
Elimination Challenge: The top 20 are given one hour to reinvent the dish that resulted in their first elimination. Emily, Willie and Shanika are the top three, and Emily wins the challenge, winning the first immunity pin. Gabriel, Stephen, and Tommy are singled out for having the worst three dishes.; Challenge winner/Immune: Emily Hallock; Bottom three: Gabriel Lewis, Stephen Lee and Tommy Walton; Eliminated: Stephen Lee
228	5	"Winners Mystery Box - Spirit of Vegas"	June 22, 2022	MC-1205	2.35
Mystery Box Challenge: Emily is immune from elimination. The remaining contestants face a mystery box challenge set by season seven winner Shaun O'Neale. They are given one hour to cook a dish featuring the spirit under their box. Brandi, Christian and Fred are the top three, and Fred wins, earning the immunity pin. Cate, Dara, and Tommy land in the bottom three.; Challenge winner/Immune: Fred Chang; Bottom three: Cate Meade, Dara Yu and Tommy Walton; Eliminated: Cate Meade
229	6	"Back to Win: Feeding the U.S. Coast Guard"	June 29, 2022	MCH-1206	2.23
Team Challenge: For the top 18's first team challenge, they must cater to 101 U.S. Coast Guards. Fred is safe from elimination, but still has to participate in the cook. The judges divided the teams up with the Blue team consisting of everyone from the first season to season seven and the two former Junior contestants, and the Red team consisting of everyone from season eight to season eleven. Christian led the Blue team while Alejandro led the Red team. The Blue team won 71-30 and rather than putting people in the bottom based on their performances, the judges immediately eliminate Alejandro.; Challenge winners: Amanda Saab, Brandi Mudd, Christian Green, Dara Yu, Derrick Fox, Shayne Wells, Shelly Flash, Tommy Walton, and Willie Mike; Eliminated: Alejandro Valdivia
230	7	"Gordon Ramsay Loves Vegans!"	July 13, 2022	MCH-1207	2.23
Elimination Challenge: Gordon shows a vegan version of his beef wellington to the top 17. They are then given one hour to cook a vegan dish. Bowen, Derrick and Amanda are the top three, and Amanda wins, receiving the immunity pin. Fred, Samantha, and Shelly present the bottom three dishes.; Challenge winner/Immune: Amanda Saab; Bottom three: Fred Chang, Samantha Daily and Shelly Flash; Eliminated: Samantha Daily
231	8	"Southern Fusion with Guest Chef Tiffany Derry"	July 20, 2022	MCH-1208	2.38
Elimination Challenge: Amanda is safe from elimination. The 15 remaining contestants are joined by Tiffany Derry for their next challenge. They are tasked with cooking a fusion dish combining Southern cuisine with an international cuisine chosen randomly. Christian, Emily and Shelly are the top three, and Christian wins, winning the immunity pin. Bowen, Bri and Shayne are the bottom three.; Challenge winner/Immune: Christian Green; Bottom three: Bri Baker, Bowen Li and Shayne Wells; Eliminated: Shayne Wells
232	9	"Bake to Win"	July 27, 2022	MCH-1209	2.35
Elimination Challenge: Christian is immune from elimination. The remaining contestants are given 90 minutes to bake one of 14 desserts, with Christian deciding the order in which they select their desserts. Michael, Amanda and Dara are the top three, and Dara wins, earning the immunity pin. Bri, Shelly, and Tommy are called out for having the worst three dishes.; Challenge winner/Immune: Dara Yu; Bottom three: Bri Baker, Shelly Flash and Tommy Walton; Eliminated: Tommy Walton
233	10	"Cooking for Horse Town U.S.A."	August 3, 2022	MCH-1210	2.22
Team Challenge: The top 14 travel to Norco, California for their next team challenge, where they are asked to prepare a steak entree with sides for 101 cowboys and cowgirls. Bri is selected as the captain of the Red Team and Shelly as the captain of the Blue Team. The Red Team members consist of Bowen, Bri, Dara, Derrick, Fred, Gabriel and Michael; the Blue Team members consist of Amanda, Brandi, Christian, Emily, Shanika, Shelly and Willie. The Red Team is declared the winner. The judges deem Shelly's performance to be the weakest and she is eliminated.; Challenge winners: Bri Baker, Bowen Li, Dara Yu, Derrick Fox, Fred Chang, Gabriel Lewis and Michael Silverstein; Eliminated: Shelly Flash
234	11	"Winners Mystery Box - Christine Ha"	August 10, 2022	MCH-1211	2.09
Mystery Box Challenge: The top 13 are given a mystery box assembled by season three winner Christine Hà. They have one hour to cook a dish using every Vietnamese cuisine ingredient in the box. Christian, Michael and Dara are the top three, and Michael wins, receiving the immunity pin. Brandi, Bri, and Emily land in the bottom three.; Challenge winner/Immune: Michael Silverstein; Bottom three: Brandi Mudd, Bri Baker and Emily Hallock; Eliminated: Bri Baker
235	12	"Tag Team"	August 17, 2022	MCH-1212	1.97
Team Challenge: The top 12 are split into six teams of two: The Blue Team (Amanda and Willie), Green Team (Bowen and Shanika), Grey Team (Derrick and Michael), Maroon Team (Brandi and Christian), Orange Team (Dara and Fred), and Yellow Team (Emily and Gabriel) for a tag team challenge. They are tasked with recreating three of Gordon's signature dishes in 90 minutes, with the teams taking turns cooking and giving directions. The Green and Grey Teams are the top four, and the Green Team wins, winning two immunity pins. The Orange and Yellow Teams are the bottom four.; Challenge winners/Immune: Bowen Li and Shanika Patterson; Bottom four: Dara Yu, Emily Hallock, Fred Chang and Gabriel Lewis; Eliminated: Gabriel Lewis
236	13	"GrubHub Challenge"	August 17, 2022	MCH-1213	1.97
Elimination Challenge: Bowen and Shanika are safe from elimination. The nine remaining contestants are given 45 minutes to create an elevated version of a randomly selected take-out dish. Michael, Dara and Derrick are the top three, and Derrick wins, receiving the immunity pin. Fred and Willie's dishes are singled out as the two worst.; Challenge winner/Immune: Derrick Fox; Bottom two: Fred Chang and Willie Mike; Eliminated: Fred Chang
237	14	"Gas Station Gourmet"	August 24, 2022	MCH-1214	2.33
Elimination Challenge: Derrick is safe from elimination. The other nine contestants have 45 minutes to make a gourmet dish inspired by gas station food. Bowen, Christian and Shanika are the top three, and Christian and Shanika each receive an immunity pin for the second time. Brandi, Michael, and Willie present the three worst dishes.; Challenge winners/Immune: Christian Green and Shanika Patterson; Bottom three: Brandi Mudd, Michael Silverstein and Willie Mike; Eliminated: Brandi Mudd
238	15	"Winners Mystery Box - Gerron Hurt"	August 24, 2022	MCH-1215	2.33
Mystery Box Challenge: The seven contestants besides Christian and Shanika face their next mystery box challenge, set by season nine winner Gerron Hurt. They are given 45 minutes to cook a dish highlighting chili peppers. Amanda and Emily are the top two, and Emily wins, receiving an advantage in the following challenge. Bowen and Derrick land in the bottom two.; Challenge winner: Emily Hallock; Bottom two: Bowen Li and Derrick Fox; Eliminated: Bowen Li
239	16	"The Wall"	August 31, 2022	MCH-1216	2.12
Team Challenge: The top eight are divided into four teams of two, with Emily choosing the teams. She selects Michael as her partner, forming the Orange Team. She then pairs up Christian and Willie (Blue Team), Amanda and Derrick (Green Team), and Shanika and Dara (Red Team). The teams are allowed to cook any dish they want, but the members cannot see each other and must communicate to produce exact replications. The Blue Team wins the challenge, and the Orange Team is saved, putting the Green and Red Teams in the bottom four.; Challenge winners: Christian Green and Willie Mike; Bottom four: Amanda Saab, Dara Yu, Derrick Fox and Shanika Patterson; Eliminated: Amanda Saab and Derrick Fox
240	17	"Restaurant Takeover - Spago"	August 31, 2022	MCH-1217	2.12
Team Challenge: The top six takeover the kitchen of Wolfgang Puck's Los Angeles restaurant, Spago. For winning the previous challenge, Willie and Christian become team captains, with the judges picking the teams. Christian leads the Red Team with Emily and Dara, while Willie leads the Blue Team with Michael and Shanika. The teams are tasked with preparing and serving two appetizers and two entrees from the menu, with Gordon running the pass. The Red Team is declared the winner.; Challenge winners: Christian Green, Dara Yu, and Emily Hallock; Eliminated: Willie Mike
241	18	"Semi Finals"	September 7, 2022	MCH-1218	2.32
Pressure Test: In the first round of the semifinals, the top five are asked to recreate a baked Alaska in 75 minutes. Dara and Christian's desserts are judged to be the best, and Shanika is saved, leaving Emily and Michael as the bottom two.; Challenge winners: Christian Green and Dara Yu; Bottom two: Emily Hallock and Michael Silverstein; Eliminated: Emily Hallock; Pressure Test: The remaining contestants must keep up with Gordon in replicating his dish as he prepares it. They are given an additional 30 seconds to plate after he finishes. Michael and Shanika's dishes are considered the two worst.; Bottom two: Michael Silverstein and Shanika Patterson; Eliminated: Shanika Patterson
242	19	"Finale Part 1 - Special Guest Graham Elliot"	September 7, 2022	MCH-1219	2.32
Finale: The finalists must prepare and execute a three-course menu consisting of an appetizer, entree and dessert, with one hour to cook each course.; Appetizers: Michael serves cold smoked steelhead trout with a pomelo and cucumber aguachile, salsa macha and pickled cucumbers. Dara serves crispy skin red snapper with grilled asparagus and a miso Béarnaise sauce. Christian serves fried green tomato with a crawfish salad, remoulade sauce and caviar.; Former MasterChef judge Graham Elliot joins the judging panel for the second course. The entrees begin cooking as the first hour ends.
243	20	"Finale Part 2 - Special Guest Christina Tosi"	September 14, 2022	MCH-1220	2.53
Entree: Michael serves chili rubbed lamb loin with a roasted poblano grit cake, corn puree and birria jus. Dara serves Chinese-style short ribs with Japanese sweet potato, spiced carrot, caramelized onions and a carrot top gremolata. Christian serves a Cajun-rubbed filet mignon with shrimp & crab cake, sauteed turnip greens, parsnip puree and a tomato Cajun cream sauce.; Former judge Christina Tosi returns for the last course of the finale.; Dessert: Dara serves vanilla floating island with a crème anglaise, tropical fruit and caramelized forbidden rice. Michael serves tres leches with deep-fried milk, mango ice cream, Cajeta "goat's milk" caramel and a tropical fruit salsa. Christian serves his grandmother's banana pudding with a bourbon caramel sauce, salted pecans and a lemon cookie.; Final Three: Christian Green, Dara Yu and Michael Silverstein; Dara is named the winner, winning $250,000, the trophy and the MasterChef title.; MasterChef Winner: Dara Yu

== See also ==
- MasterChef: Back to Win
