= MasterChef (American TV series) season 9 =

Season of television series

MasterChef
- Season 9
- Promotional poster for season 9, featuring (L to R) Aarón Sánchez, Gordon Ramsay, and Joe Bastianich
- Judges: Gordon Ramsay; Aarón Sánchez; Joe Bastianich
- No. of contestants: 24
- Winner: Gerron Hurt
- Runners-up: Ashley Mincey; Cesar Cano
- No. of episodes: 23

Release
- Original network: Fox
- Original release: May 30 – September 19, 2018

Season chronology
- ← Previous; Season 8 Next → Season 10

The ninth season of the American competitive reality television series MasterChef premiered on Fox on May 30, 2018, and concluded on September 19, 2018. Gordon Ramsay and Aarón Sánchez returned from the previous season as judges, while former judge Joe Bastianich returned to the show as the third judge, replacing Christina Tosi. The season was won by English teacher Gerron Hurt, with professional grocery shopper Ashley Mincey and high school teacher Cesar Cano as co-runners-up.

This season introduced a new format to the show, as the three judges each selected eight contestants to give aprons to. Then, the judges mentored their respective contestants throughout the competition.

== Top 24 ==
Except where noted, the source for all names, hometowns, and occupations: All ages and nicknames as given on air.

Contestant	Age	Hometown	Occupation	Mentor	Status
Gerron Hurt	25	Louisville, Kentucky	English Teacher	Joe	Winner September 19
Ashley Mincey	28	Opa-Locka, Florida	Professional Grocery Shopper	Gordon	Runners-up September 19
Cesar Cano	33	Houston, Texas	High School Teacher	Aarón	Runners-up September 19
Samantha Daily	20	West Des Moines, Iowa	College Student	Gordon	Eliminated September 12
Bowen Li	24	Tianjin, China	Pilot	Gordon	Eliminated September 12
Farhan Momin	25	Chicago, Illinois	Dental Student	Aarón	Eliminated September 5
Julia Danno	43	Chicago, Illinois	Sales Manager	Aarón	Eliminated August 29
Shanika Patterson	34	Miami, Florida	Event Promoter	Joe	Eliminated August 29
Taylor Waltmon	30	Houston, Texas	Sales Training Director	Gordon	Eliminated August 22
Emily Hallock	28	Neenah, Wisconsin	Food Research Analyst	Joe	Eliminated August 22
Chelsea Sargent	28	Houston, Texas	Sales Specialist	Aarón	Eliminated August 15
Seung Joo "SJ" Yun	21	Los Angeles, California	College Student	Gordon	Eliminated August 15
Ralph Xavier Degala	29	Houston, Texas	Senior Accountant	Joe	Eliminated August 8
Mark Ingraham	19	Rockport, Maine	Dishwasher	Joe	Eliminated August 1
Ryan Cortez	33	Houston, Texas	Drummer	Aarón	Eliminated July 25
Lindsay Haigh	41	Orange, Massachusetts	Trial Attorney	Aarón	Eliminated July 18
Matthew "Matt" Houck	28	Iowa City, Iowa	Optometrist	Joe	Eliminated July 18
Juni Cuevas	28	Raleigh, North Carolina	Disability Analyst	Aarón	Eliminated July 11
Alecia Winters	30	Grand Rapids, Michigan	Daycare Owner	Aarón	Eliminated June 27
Darrick Krause	34	Peoria, Arizona	Engineer	Gordon	Eliminated June 20
Olusola Ogbomo	29	Columbia, South Carolina	Bus Driver	Joe	Eliminated June 13
Stephanie Willis	32	Cherry Hill, New Jersey	Bartender	Gordon	Eliminated June 13
Sal Maida	31	Los Angeles, California	Architect	Joe	Eliminated June 6
Sid Hoeltzell	63	Miami, Florida	Food Photographer	Gordon	Eliminated June 6

== Elimination table ==
Place	Contestant	Episodes																														
Place	Contestant	4		5		6	7		8	9		10		11	12		13		14	15		16	17		18	19		20			21	22/23
1	Gerron	IN	IMM	LOW	LOW	WIN	IN	IMM	WIN	LOW	WIN	LOW	IN	LOW	IN	WIN	IN	IN	NPT	WIN	IMM	WIN	IN	IMM	PT	HIGH	LOW	WIN	IMM	IMM	LOW	WINNER
2	Ashley	WIN	IMM	IN	IMM	WIN	IN	IMM	LOW	IN	IN	LOW	IN	WIN	IN	WIN	IN	IN	NPT	HIGH	IN	PT	HIGH	IN	WIN	HIGH	IN	LOW	WIN	IMM	WIN	RUNNERS-UP
2	Cesar	IN	IMM	IN	IMM	NPT	WIN	IMM	WIN	WIN	IMM	LOW	LOW	PT	IN	LOW	WIN	IMM	WIN	IN	WIN	WIN	WIN	IMM	WIN	HIGH	IN	WIN	IMM	IMM	WIN	RUNNERS-UP
4	Samantha	IN	IMM	LOW	IN	WIN	HIGH	LOW	WIN	WIN	IMM	IN	IMM	PT	IN	IN	IN	LOW	WIN	IN	IN	PT	HIGH	IN	LOW	HIGH	LOW	LOW	LOW	WIN	ELIM	
5	Bowen	IN	IMM	HIGH	IMM	WIN	HIGH	LOW	IN	WIN	IMM	IN	IMM	PT	IN	IN	IN	IN	WIN	IN	WIN	LOW	IN	IN	WIN	WIN	IN	LOW	LOW	ELIM		
6	Farhan	HIGH	IMM	LOW	IN	LOW	IN	IMM	WIN	IN	IN	IN	IMM	WIN	IN	IN	IN	WIN	NPT	HIGH	IN	WIN	IN	LOW	ELIM							
7	Julia	IN	IMM	IN	IMM	WIN	IN	IN	WIN	IN	WIN	WIN	IMM	WIN	IN	IN	IN	IN	WIN	IN	LOW	WIN	IN	ELIM								
8	Shanika	IN	IMM	IN	IMM	LOW	IN	LOW	IN	IN	LOW	IN	IMM	WIN	WIN	IMM	IN	IN	PT	IN	IN	ELIM										
9	Taylor	IN	IMM	IN	IMM	PT	IN	IN	IN	LOW	IN	LOW	IN	WIN	IN	IN	IN	IN	WIN	IN	ELIM											
10	Emily	HIGH	IMM	IN	IMM	PT	IN	IMM	WIN	IN	WIN	IN	IMM	PT	IN	IN	WIN	IMM	ELIM													
11	Chelsea	IN	IMM	WIN	IMM	PT	IN	IMM	WIN	IN	LOW	IN	IMM	WIN	HIGH	IN	IN	ELIM														
11	SJ	IN	IMM	IN	IMM	WIN	IN	IMM	IN	IN	WIN	WIN	IMM	PT	IN	LOW	IN	ELIM														
13	Ralph	IN	IMM	LOW	IN	WIN	IN	IMM	IN	WIN	IMM	IMM	IMM	WIN	HIGH	ELIM																
14	Mark	IN	IMM	IN	IMM	WIN	IN	IMM	WIN	WIN	IMM	LOW	WIN	ELIM																		
15	Ryan	IN	IMM	LOW	IN	WIN	IN	IMM	WIN	WIN	IMM	LOW	ELIM																			
16	Lindsay	IN	IMM	IN	IMM	PT	IN	IMM	IN	IN	ELIM																					
17	Matt	IN	IMM	LOW	IN	WIN	IN	WIN	IN	ELIM																						
18	Juni	IN	IMM	IN	IMM	NPT	IN	IN	ELIM																							
19	Alecia	LOW	IN	IN	IMM	NPT	IN	ELIM																								
20	Darrick	IN	IMM	LOW	IN	ELIM																										
21	Olusola	IN	IMM	LOW	ELIM																											
21	Stephanie	IN	IMM	LOW	ELIM																											
23	Sal	LOW	ELIM																													
23	Sid	LOW	ELIM																													

(WINNER) This cook won the competition.
(RUNNER-UP) This cook finished as a runner-up in the finals.
(WIN) The cook won the individual challenge (Mystery Box Challenge/ Skills Test or Elimination Test).
(WIN) The cook was on the winning team in the Team Challenge and directly advanced to the next round.
(HIGH) The cook was one of the top entries in the individual challenge but didn't win.
(IN) The cook wasn't selected as a top or bottom entry in an individual challenge.
(IN) The cook wasn't selected as a top or bottom entry in a team challenge.
(IMM) The cook didn't have to compete in that round of the competition and was safe from elimination.
(IMM) The cook was selected by Mystery Box Challenge winner and didn't have to compete in the Elimination Test.
(PT) The cook was on the losing team in the Team Challenge, competed in the Pressure Test, and advanced.
(NPT) The cook was on the losing team in the Team Challenge, did not compete in the Pressure Test, and advanced.
(LOW) The cook was one of the bottom entries in an individual challenge or Pressure Test, and they advanced.
(LOW) The cook was one of the bottom entries in the Team Challenge and they advanced.
(ELIM) The cook was eliminated from MasterChef.

== Episodes ==
No. overall	No. in season	Title	Original release date	U.S. viewers (millions)
158	1	"The Judges Do Battle, Part 1"	May 30, 2018	3.68
Auditions Round 1: The judges open the series by explaining the new format. Each judge will award eight aprons to contestants and then they will mentor their respective contestants throughout the competition. If more than one judge wishes to award an apron to a contestant, the contestant is allowed to decide which judge will be their mentor. Jannie, Emily and Bowen are up first and must make a beef dish. Joe awarded aprons to Emily and Bowen, and Gordon awarded one to Bowen also. Bowen chose Gordon while Jannie fails to advance. Cynthia and Shanika next make desserts. Cynthia is not offered an apron while both Aarón and Joe offer aprons to Shanika; she chooses Joe. In a montage of contestants, Gordon awards an apron to Sid and Aarón awards an apron to Julia. Samantha and Mark are next and can make any signature dish; Gordon awards an apron to Samantha and Joe awards an apron to Mark.
159	2	"The Judges Do Battle, Part 2"	May 30, 2018	3.68
Auditions Round 2: Taylor, Ralph and Chelsea, who are all from Houston, next make their signature dishes; Gordon gives an apron to Taylor, Joe gives an apron to Ralph, and Aarón gives an apron to Chelsea. Olusola and Mark next make their signature dishes; all three judges award an apron to Olusola and she chooses Joe while Mark fails to advance. After another montage of failed contestants, Cesar, Matt, Ryan and SJ all make fish dishes. Aarón awarded aprons to Cesar, SJ and Ryan, Joe awarded one to Matt, while Gordon awarded aprons to SJ and Cesar. SJ chose Gordon and Cesar chose Aarón.
160	3	"The Judges Do Battle, Part 3"	June 6, 2018	3.26
Auditions Round 3: Farhan and Gerron cook their signature dishes with chicken. Joe gave an apron to Gerron while Aarón and Gordon gave aprons to Farhan who chose Aarón's. Alecia, Darrick and Tye were given 45 minutes to cook their variation of one of Gordon's signature dishes. Darrick won an apron from Gordon while Alecia received an apron from Aarón and Tye was eliminated. A montage shows Aarón reward an apron to Lindsay, Gordon offer an apron to Stephanie and Joe gave his last apron to Sal. Ashley, Chera, Juni and Nik are next to compete for the last two places in the Top 24. Gordon gave his last apron to Ashley and Aarón gave his to Juni.
161	4	"Home State Heroes"	June 6, 2018	3.26
Mystery Box Challenge: The Top 24 contestants each receive an ingredient that is native to their home state to cook their dishes in one hour. The judges each pick their respective contestant to name the top three dishes. Ashley, Emily and Farhan have the top three dishes and Ashley wins. Alecia, Sal and Sid are chosen as the bottom three by their mentors.; Challenge Winner/Immune: Ashley Mincey; Bottom three: Alecia Winters, Sal Maida and Sid Hoeltzell; Elimination Challenge: The bottom three must cook their version of steak and potatoes.; Eliminated: Sal Maida and Sid Hoeltzell
162	5	"Gordon Ramsay Masterclass"	June 13, 2018	3.92
Skill Test: The Top 22 were given a demonstration on how to properly prepare a dungeness crab in 30 minutes. Chelsea was the winner of the challenge and pronounced safe, while Darrick, Farhan, Gerron, Matt, Ralph, Olusola, Ryan, Samantha and Stephanie all failed to impress the judges. The remaining chefs were declared safe and immune for the next challenge.; Challenge Winner/Immune: Chelsea Sargent; Immune: Alecia Winters, Ashley Mincey, Bowen Li, Cesar Cano, Emily Hallock, Julia Danno, Juni Cuevas, Lindsay Haigh, Mark Ingraham, Shanika Patterson, SJ Yun and Taylor Waltmon; Elimination Challenge: The remaining chefs were tasked to recreate Ramsay's crab eggs Benedict dish, with a warning that two chefs would be eliminated. Gerron, Olusola and Stephanie were in the bottom three.; Bottom three: Gerron Hurt, Olusola Ogbomo and Stephanie Willis; Eliminated: Olusola Ogbomo and Stephanie Willis
163	6	"Trouble Brewing"	June 20, 2018	3.65
Team Challenge: The Top 20 contestants were taken to the Anheuser-Busch brewery in Van Nuys, California where they are split into teams. Chelsea captains the Blue Team while Bowen captains the Red Team. Chelsea elects to choose her Blue Team members which are Alecia, Lindsay, Taylor, Juni, Darrick, Farhan, Cesar, Shanika and Emily; all other contestants are assigned to the Red Team. Both teams must cook dishes for 101 employees that have beer as an ingredient and the employees will choose the winning team. The Red Team wins the challenge.; Challenge Winners/Immune: Ashley Mincey, Bowen Li, Gerron Hurt, Julia Danno, Mark Ingraham, Matt Houck, Ralph Degala, Ryan Cortez, Samantha Daily and SJ Yun.; Pressure Test: Chelsea is allowed to exempt three members of her team and she chooses Cesar, Alecia and Juni. The remaining chefs must make a banana cream pie in 60 minutes. Farhan, Shanika and Darrick have the bottom three dishes.; Immune: Alecia Winters, Cesar Cano and Juni Cuevas; Bottom three: Darrick Krause, Farhan Momin and Shanika Patterson; Eliminated: Darrick Krause
164	7	"World Cup Dishes"	June 27, 2018	3.81
Mystery Box Challenge: The Top 19 contestants are given one hour to cook a dish with walnuts. Bowen, Samantha and Cesar's dishes were in the top three. Cesar was the winner of the challenge.; Challenge Winner/Immune: Cesar Cano; Elimination Challenge: Alexi Lalas joins the show to introduce this challenge. Cesar gets to choose one of three dishes inspired by the judges' favorite soccer snacks and he chooses Aarón's churros with chocolate sauce. Cesar also gets to pick ten other contestants to make immune; he chooses Chelsea, Ashley, Emily, SJ, Ralph, Farhan, Gerron, Ryan, Lindsay and Mark. The remaining eight contestants have 30 minutes to cook. The best dish belongs to Matt, the bottom four dishes are Shanika, Bowen, Alecia and Samantha.; Immune: Ashley Mincey, Chelsea Sargent, Emily Hallock, Farhan Momin, Gerron Hurt, Lindsay Haigh, Mark Ingraham, Ralph Degala, Ryan Cortez and SJ Yun.; Challenge Winner: Matt Houck.; Bottom four: Alecia Winters, Bowen Li, Samantha Daily and Shanika Patterson.; Eliminated: Alecia Winters
165	8	"A Gordon Ramsay Wedding"	July 11, 2018	3.31
Team Challenge: The contestants cater for the wedding reception of season seven winner Shaun O'Neale. They are required to prepare a scallop appetizer and a duck entrée. Juni is chosen as the Red Team captain, and Julia the Blue Team captain. Julia chooses Lindsay, SJ, Taylor, Ashley, Ralph, Bowen, Matt and Shanika; while Juni chooses Cesar, Mark, Farhan, Gerron, Samantha, Chelsea and Ryan. After the teams are picked, the judges force the captains to switch teams, making Julia now the Red Team captain and Juni the Blue Team captain. The Red Team wins the challenge. Afterwards, the judges save Shanika and Taylor. Back in the MasterChef kitchen, the judges announce there will be no pressure test and the contestants would be judged on their performance. Ashley and Juni are announced as the bottom two.; Challenge Winners/Immune: Cesar Cano, Chelsea Sargent, Emily Hallock, Farhan Momin, Gerron Hurt, Julia Danno, Mark Ingraham, Ryan Cortez and Samantha Daily.; Immune: Shanika Patterson and Taylor Waltmon; Bottom two: Ashley Mincey and Juni Cuevas; Eliminated: Juni Cuevas
166	9	"The Big Not Easy"	July 18, 2018	3.60
Mystery Box Challenge: The Top 17 contestants are given one hour to cook a dish with Cajun seafood, with Aarón cooking next to them. At the end of the hour, Joe announced that the chef with the worst dish would be eliminated. Taylor, Gerron and Matt were in the bottom three.; Bottom three: Gerron Hurt, Matt Houck and Taylor Waltmon; Taylor and Gerron are spared, and Matt is eliminated. After Matt left, the judges name Bowen, Samantha, Ralph, Mark, Cesar, and Ryan as the top six of the Mystery Box Challenge.; Eliminated: Matt Houck; Challenge Winners/Immune: Bowen Li, Cesar Cano, Mark Ingraham, Ralph Degala, Ryan Cortez and Samantha Daily; Elimination Challenge: The remaining chefs were tasked in making a fresh version of a Salisbury steak dish, while the six immune chefs had three minutes to decide how much cooking time each person had. Shanika received 40 minutes, Emily received 35 minutes, and Julia received 30 minutes while the remaining chefs had 45 minutes. The best dishes belonged to Emily, Julia, SJ, and Gerron. The bottom three were Shanika, Lindsay and Chelsea.; Challenge Winners: Emily Hallock, Gerron Hurt, Julia Danno and SJ Yun; Bottom three: Chelsea Sargent, Lindsay Haigh and Shanika Patterson; Eliminated: Lindsay Haigh
167	10	"Rise or Fall"	July 25, 2018	3.71
Team Challenge: The Top 15 contestants pair up on their own to create a dish featuring five ingredients. The teams are Cesar and Mark, Julia and SJ, Farhan and Emily, Bowen and Shanika, Samantha and Chelsea, Ryan and Gerron, and Ashley and Taylor. Ralph is left out of the pairs, so instead he gets to pair with his mentor, Joe, and he is also safe from elimination. The winning team is Julia and SJ, while the teams of Ryan and Gerron, Ashley and Taylor, and Cesar and Mark must face the elimination challenge. The remaining teams are safe.; Immune: Ralph Degala; Challenge Winners/Immune: Julia Danno and SJ Yun; Elimination Challenge: The remaining six chefs must create a cheese soufflé in 40 minutes. The best dish belonged to Mark. Cesar and Ryan are called as the bottom two.; Challenge Winner: Mark Ingraham; Bottom two: Cesar Cano and Ryan Cortez; Eliminated: Ryan Cortez
168	11	"The Kids are Alright"	August 1, 2018	3.54
Team Challenge: The Top 14 contestants are split into teams, with Julia and SJ the team captains for winning the last challenge. SJ captains the Blue Team and he selects Mark, Gerron, Cesar, Samantha, Emily and Bowen. Julia captains the Red Team and she selects Ralph, Farhan, Taylor, Chelsea, Ashley and Shanika. The teams are assigned crates of ingredients to choose from, and will have 90 minutes to cook a meal for special guests in the MasterChef restaurant. The winning recipe will also be featured in Family Circle magazine. The winning team will be chosen by the restaurant diners. During the cooking process, it is revealed that the restaurant diners are children. The Red Team wins with 66% of the vote.; Challenge Winners/Immune: Ashley Mincey, Chelsea Sargent, Farhan Momin, Julia Danno, Ralph Degala, Shanika Patterson and Taylor Waltmon; Pressure Test: Former judge Christina Tosi returns to judge this challenge, and she will be the only person judging it. The Blue Team members must make a box of 12 cupcakes in 75 minutes. Mark and Gerron are the bottom two contestants.; Bottom two: Gerron Hurt and Mark Ingraham; Eliminated: Mark Ingraham
169	12	"Frying Tonight"	August 8, 2018	3.70
Mystery Box Challenge: The Top 13 contestants have 45 minutes to make a dish featuring something that is deep fried, and all three judges cook alongside them. The top three dishes belong to Shanika, Ralph and Chelsea, and Shanika wins the challenge.; Challenge Winner/Immune: Shanika Patterson; Elimination Challenge: The remaining contestants must cook a dish featuring citrus fruit, and Shanika gets to decide who must make a savory dish and who must make a sweet dish. Shanika assigns savory dishes to Gerron, Taylor, Emily, Chelsea, Bowen and Samantha, and sweet dishes to Cesar, SJ, Ralph, Farhan, Ashley and Julia. The two best dishes belong to Gerron and Ashley, while SJ, Cesar and Ralph are in the bottom.; Challenge Winners: Ashley Mincey and Gerron Hurt; Bottom three: Cesar Cano, Ralph Degala and SJ Yun; Eliminated: Ralph Degala
170	13	"Just for the Halibut"	August 15, 2018	3.42
Skills Test: The Top 12 contestants are shown how to properly filet a halibut by Gordon and then have just 20 minutes to do the same. Cesar and Emily are deemed the only contestants to have met Gordon's level.; Challenge Winners/Immune: Cesar Cano and Emily Hallock; Elimination Challenge: The other 10 contestants are given 45 minutes to make a dish of their choosing using the halibut they had fileted. Farhan has the best dish of the night, while Chelsea, Samantha and SJ are in the bottom.; Challenge Winner: Farhan Momin; Bottom three: Chelsea Sargent, Samantha Daily and SJ Yun; Eliminated: Chelsea Sargent and SJ Yun
171	14	"Sky's the Limit"	August 22, 2018	3.25
Team Challenge: The top ten contestants are split into teams, with Emily and Cesar the team captains for winning the last challenge. Each contestant chooses what team they want to be in. Shanika, Gerron, Ashley and Farhan join Emily's Blue Team and Julia, Taylor, Bowen and Samantha join Cesar's Red Team. The teams are assigned crates of ingredients to choose from, and will have to serve 100 Air Force members a dish. The winning team will be chosen by the restaurant diners. The votes tie, however the judges pick the Red Team to win because the feedback was better.; Challenge Winners/Immune: Bowen Li, Cesar Cano, Julia Danno, Samantha Daily and Taylor Waltmon; Pressure Test: Before beginning the pressure test, Emily (as Blue Team captain) is given a choice - save herself, and let her teammates compete against each other, or choose one of her teammates to duel and save the others. Emily chooses to cook against Shanika, and both of them are tasked with making a black forest gateau that has at least four layers, in 75 minutes.; Immune: Gerron Hurt, Ashley Mincey and Farhan Momin; Bottom two: Emily Hallock and Shanika Patterson; Eliminated: Emily Hallock
172	15	"Tag Team"	August 22, 2018	3.25
Mystery Box Challenge: The top nine contestants first have one on one time with their mentors before cooking. They have 45 minutes to make a dish featuring a different classic American ingredient. The top three dishes belong to Ashley, Gerron and Farhan, and Gerron wins the challenge.; Challenge Winner/Immune: Gerron Hurt; Elimination Challenge: The remaining eight contestants have 60 minutes to make a Mediterranean platter in pairs with the teammates switching out every ten minutes in a tag team challenge. Gerron gets to decide the pairs. Cesar is paired with Bowen, Samantha with Shanika, Julia with Taylor and Ashley with Farhan. The winners of the challenge are Bowen and Cesar while the bottom pair is Julia and Taylor. The remaining pairs are safe.; Challenge Winners: Bowen Li and Cesar Cano; Bottom two: Julia Danno and Taylor Waltmon; Eliminated: Taylor Waltmon
173	16	"American Heroes"	August 29, 2018	3.39
Team Challenge: Bowen and Cesar are the team captains in this challenge where they must serve a meal to 25 firefighters. Bowen won the coin toss and has the option to select the protein or select his team; he selects the protein. Cesar selects Julia, Gerron and Farhan to form the Blue Team, leaving Ashley, Samantha and Shanika for Bowen and the Red Team. The Blue Team wins the challenge with 72% of the votes from the firefighters.; Team Challenge Winners/Immune: Cesar Cano, Farhan Momin, Gerron Hurt and Julia Danno; Pressure Test: The losing team had to recreate three pasta dishes in one hour after a demonstration by Joe. Samantha and Ashley were declared safe.; Bottom two: Bowen Li and Shanika Patterson; Eliminated: Shanika Patterson
174	17	"Waste Not Want Not"	August 29, 2018	3.39
Mystery Box Challenge: The top seven must cook a two-course meal in 45 minutes with food scraps, while Gordon cooks alongside them and makes a three-course meal. Samantha, Ashley and Cesar produced the top three dishes and Cesar wins the challenge.; Challenge Winner/Immune: Cesar Cano; Elimination Challenge: The other contestants must make a dish in 45 minutes using the whole ingredients of the same scraps they cooked with earlier. After the dishes are finished, Cesar gets to save one other contestant and he selects Gerron. The bottom two is between Julia and Farhan.; Immune: Gerron Hurt; Bottom two: Farhan Momin and Julia Danno; Eliminated: Julia Danno
175	18	"Restaurant Takeover"	September 5, 2018	3.37
Team Challenge: The judges decide the teams and the team captains for this challenge which will be a restaurant takeover. The Red Team is Cesar, Bowen and Ashley who leads the team. The Blue Team is Farhan, Samantha and Gerron who leads the team. The teams must prepare two appetizers and two entrees for the restaurant diners with Gordon expediting. The Red Team wins.; Challenge Winners/Immune: Ashley Mincey, Bowen Li and Cesar Cano; Pressure Test: The losing team had to cook three desserts that each featured chocolate in 60 minutes. Samantha and Farhan are the bottom two.; Bottom two: Farhan Momin and Samantha Daily; Eliminated: Farhan Momin
176	19	"Cooking with Heart"	September 5, 2018	3.37
Mystery Box Challenge: The top five must cook a dish inspired by their loved ones as they are visited by members of their family. All five contestants were called up and Bowen wins the challenge.; Challenge Winner: Bowen Li; Elimination Test: The judges decide that Bowen must also cook in the elimination test which involves cooking different types of hearts. Bowen's advantage is deciding which type of heart everyone will use to make a dish. Samantha and Gerron are called out as the bottom two.; Bottom two: Gerron Hurt and Samantha Daily; Eliminated: None
177	20	"Battle of the Beef"	September 12, 2018	3.63
Challenge: The final five must complete three challenges, each of them featuring beef as the main ingredient. The judges will deem contestants safe after each challenge, and the last contestant remaining after all three challenges are completed will be eliminated from the competition.; Skill Test 1: For the first test, the five remaining contestants are tasked with creating a beef kebab dish within 30 minutes. Cesar and Gerron are deemed to have the best dishes, and are safe from elimination.; Immune: Cesar Cano and Gerron Hurt; Skill Test 2: For the second test, the remaining three chefs must make a dish of ground beef meatballs with a marinara sauce, in 30 minutes. Ashley advances, leaving Bowen and Samantha to face the elimination challenge.; Immune: Ashley Mincey; Bottom two: Bowen Li and Samantha Daily; Skill Test 3: For the final test, Bowen and Samantha must cook three filet mignon steaks to three different temperatures (well done, medium, and rare) in 30 minutes. Samantha's steaks are deemed better than Bowen's, eliminating the latter.; Eliminated: Bowen Li
178	21	"The Semi Final"	September 12, 2018	3.63
Team Challenge: The contestants are split into pairs for their next-challenge. For having the most Mystery Box challenge wins, Cesar is allowed to choose his partner. He teams up with Ashley, leaving Gerron and Samantha as the other pair. For this challenge, the judges are joined by their mentors - Daniel Boulud, Jonathan Waxman, and Lidia Bastianich, who will serve as the sole judges for this challenge. The teams given an hour to cook three portions of whatever dish they like, with the winning team progressing straight to the finale. Ashley and Cesar win the challenge, progressing to the finale.; Finalists: Ashley Mincey and Cesar Cano; Elimination Challenge: To earn the last spot in the finale, Gerron and Samantha must cook head to head, with the winner of this duel progressing to the finale. They are given an hour to prepare a three-course dinner, consisting of dishes chosen by each judge - an appetizer of spring risotto (chosen by Joe), an entrée of pan-seared salmon (chosen by Aarón), and a dessert of sticky toffee pudding with mascarpone mousse (chosen by Gordon). Gerron defeats Samantha two dishes to one, earning the last spot in the finale.; Finalist: Gerron Hurt; Eliminated: Samantha Daily
179	22	"The Finale, Pt. 1"	September 19, 2018	3.56
Finale: The judges visit their respective contestants before the finals begin. The three finalists will have one hour for each course to prepare three portions of their best appetizer, entrée, and dessert.; Appetizer: Ashley serves a pan-seared red snapper with conch salad, malanga fritters, and ají coconut sauce. Cesar serves a squid ink infladita with lobster, dragon fruit salsa, caviar, and roasted poblano sauce. Gerron serves a Nashville hot quail with fingerling potato salad and poached quail eggs.; The entrées begin cooking as the first hour ends.
180	23	"The Finale, Pt. 2"	September 19, 2018	3.56
Entrée: Ashley serves a pan-seared guinea hen with black-eyed pea and collard green ragout and quince cognac sauce. Cesar serves a pan-seared duck breast with charcoal roasted vegetables and almond mole. Gerron serves carabinero prawns with heirloom grits, shellfish au jus, and crispy shallots.; Dessert: Gerron serves an amaretto chess pie with raspberry coulis and popped sorghum. Cesar serves a flourless chocolate cake with taramind caramel and spicy pepita brittle. Ashley serves an orange genoise with smoked chocolate ganache and glazed cherries.; Final Three: Ashley Mincey, Cesar Cano and Gerron Hurt; Winner Revealed: Gerron is named the winner of this year's MasterChef, winning him the $250,000, the trophy, and the cookbook deal.; MasterChef Winner: Gerron Hurt
