= MasterChef (American TV series) season 10 =

Season of television series

MasterChef
- Season 10
- Promotional poster for season 10, featuring (L to R) Gordon Ramsay, Aarón Sánchez, and Joe Bastianich
- Judges: Gordon Ramsay; Aarón Sánchez; Joe Bastianich
- No. of contestants: 20
- Winner: Dorian Hunter
- Runner-up: Sarah Faherty
- No. of episodes: 25

Release
- Original network: Fox
- Original release: May 29 – September 18, 2019

Season chronology
- ← Previous; Season 9 Next → Season 11

The tenth season of the American competitive reality television series MasterChef premiered on Fox on May 29, 2019, and concluded on September 18, 2019. Gordon Ramsay, Aarón Sánchez, and Joe Bastianich all returned as judges. The season was won by creeler Dorian Hunter, with former Army interrogator Sarah Faherty finishing second, and college student Nick DiGiovanni placing third.

== Top 20 ==
Except where otherwise cited, source for names, hometowns and occupations: Ages and nicknames as given on air.

Contestant	Age	Hometown	Occupation	Status
Dorian Hunter	45	Cartersville, Georgia	Creeler	Winner September 18
Sarah Faherty	31	San Diego, California	Former Army Interrogator	Runner-up September 18
Nick DiGiovanni	22	Barrington, Rhode Island	College Student	Eliminated September 18
Noah Sims	32	Epworth, Georgia	Septic Service Technician	Eliminated September 11
Shari Mukherjee	34	Rochester, Minnesota	Stay-at-Home Mom	Eliminated September 4
Subha Ramiah	54	West Nyack, New York	R&D Director	Eliminated September 4
Micah Yaroch	19	Grand Rapids, Michigan	Kitchen Porter	Eliminated August 28
Brielle "Bri" Baker	24	Dallas, Texas	Cocktail Server	Eliminated August 21
Jamie Hough	42	Pawleys Island, South Carolina	Fisherman	Eliminated August 15
Fred Chang	24	Redondo Beach, California	Revenue Analyst	Eliminated August 8
Wuta Onda	30	Bronx, New York	English Teacher	Eliminated August 1
Renee Rice	33	Ada, Oklahoma	Receptionist	Eliminated July 31
Samuel "Sam" Haaz	35	Philadelphia, Pennsylvania	Attorney	Eliminated July 25
Keturah King	30	London, England	Freelance Writer	Eliminated July 18
Elizabeth "Liz" Linn	53	Durand, Michigan	Events Consultant	Eliminated July 11
Michael Silverstein	31	Pittsburgh, Pennsylvania	Real Estate Flipper	Eliminated July 11
Evan Tesiny	36	Brooklyn, New York	Sales Coordinator	Eliminated June 27
Kimberly White	31	New York, New York	Shoe Designer	Eliminated June 20
Deanna Colon	45	Simi Valley, California	Vocal Coach	Eliminated June 12
Kenneth "Kenny" Palazzolo	46	Boston, Massachusetts	Carpenter	Eliminated June 12

== Elimination table ==
Place	Contestant	Episode																								
Place	Contestant	3		4/5			6/7		8/9		10/11		12/13		14/15		16/17		18/19		20	21		22	23	24/25
1	Dorian	IN	IN	LOW	PT	IMM	IN	HIGH	LOW	IN	LOW	IN	HIGH	WIN	WIN	IMM	WIN	IMM	HIGH	IN	IN	WIN	IMM	WIN	IN	WINNER
2	Sarah	WIN	IMM	LOW	LOW	PT	IN	IN	LOW	IN	LOW	WIN	IN	IN	IN	IN	WIN	IMM	IN	IN	HIGH	WIN	IMM	WIN	IN	RUNNER-UP
3	Nick	WIN	IMM	WIN	IMM	IMM	WIN	IMM	WIN	IMM	WIN	IMM	HIGH	IN	LOW	LOW	LOW	IN	WIN	IMM	HIGH	IN	IN	LOW	IN	ELIM
4	Noah	WIN	IMM	WIN	IMM	IMM	IN	HIGH	LOW	IN	LOW	LOW	IN	IN	IN	LOW	LOW	IN	IN	IN	LOW	IN	IN	WIN	ELIM	
5	Shari	IN	IN	LOW	LOW	PT	WIN	IMM	LOW	LOW	WIN	IMM	HIGH	IMM	IN	IN	LOW	IN	IN	IN	HIGH	WIN	IMM	ELIM		
5	Subha	WIN	IMM	WIN^{1}	LOW	PT	IN	IN	LOW	IN	WIN	IMM	IN	IN	IN	LOW	WIN^{1}	IN	IN	IN	WIN	IN	LOW	ELIM		
7	Micah	IN	IN	LOW	LOW	PT	IN	HIGH	WIN	IMM	LOW	IN	HIGH	IMM	IN	LOW	WIN	IMM	IN	IN	LOW	IN	ELIM			
8	Bri	IN	IN	WIN	IMM	IMM	HIGH	HIGH	WIN	IMM	WIN	IMM	IN	LOW	LOW	LOW	LOW	LOW	HIGH	IN	ELIM					
9	Jamie	WIN	IMM	LOW	PT	IMM	IN	HIGH	WIN	IMM	LOW	IN	IN	IN	IN	IN	WIN	IMM	IN	ELIM						
10	Fred	WIN	IMM	WIN	IMM	IMM	LOW	LOW	WIN	IMM	WIN	IMM	WIN	IMM	IN	IN	LOW	ELIM								
11	Wuta	IN	LOW	LOW	LOW	LOW	WIN	IMM	WIN	IMM	LOW	LOW	HIGH	IN	IN	ELIM										
12	Renee	WIN	IMM	LOW	LOW	LOW	IN	HIGH	WIN	IMM	WIN	IMM	IN	LOW	ELIM											
13	Sam	WIN	IMM	WIN	IMM	IMM	LOW	LOW	LOW	LOW	WIN	IMM	IN	ELIM												
14	Keturah	WIN	IMM	WIN	IMM	IMM	IN	IN	WIN	IMM	LOW	ELIM														
15	Liz	IN	LOW	WIN	IMM	IMM	LOW	HIGH	LOW	ELIM																
15	Michael	WIN	IMM	LOW	PT	IMM	HIGH	WIN	LOW	ELIM																
17	Evan	IN	LOW	WIN	IMM	IMM	HIGH	ELIM																		
18	Kimberly	IN	IN	LOW	LOW	ELIM																				
19	Deanna	IN	ELIM																							
19	Kenny	IN	ELIM																							

(WINNER) This cook won the competition.
(RUNNER-UP) This cook finished as a runner-up in the finals.
(WIN) The cook won the individual challenge (Mystery Box Challenge/ Skills Test or Elimination Test).
(WIN) The cook was on the winning team in the Team Challenge and directly advanced to the next round.
(HIGH) The cook was one of the top entries in the individual challenge but didn't win.
(IN) The cook wasn't selected as a top or bottom entry in an individual challenge.
(IN) The cook wasn't selected as a top or bottom entry in a team challenge.
(IMM) The cook didn't have to compete in that round of the competition and was safe from elimination.
(PT) The cook was on the losing team in the Team Challenge, competed in the Pressure Test, and advanced.
(LOW) The cook was one of the bottom entries in an individual challenge or Pressure Test, and they advanced.
(LOW) The cook was one of the bottom entries in the Team Challenge and they advanced.
(ELIM) The cook was eliminated from MasterChef.

^Note 1This contestant was on the winning team but was selected to compete in the elimination test by their team captain.

== Episodes ==
No. overall	No. in season	Title	Original release date	U.S. viewers (millions)
181	1	"The Epic 10th Season Auditions - Pt. 1"	May 29, 2019	3.14
Auditions Round 1: The judges welcome all of the potential contestants and inform them that in addition to the regular prizes of $250,000 and the MasterChef trophy, the winner will also receive training at restaurants owned by the three respective judges. All judges must agree to allow the contestant to earn an apron and advance, but each judge also has one pass they can give a contestant to give them a second chance at the audition process. The auditions are assisted by previous winners Shaun O'Neale, Christine Hà, and Jennifer Behm. Allen and Sabina are the first candidates and neither advances. Dorian is next and she advances. Nick, Liz and Keturah audition and all advance. Some more unnamed contestants fail but Subha advances. Kenny advances next. Jamie and Sam are the next group and they both advance. Sarah becomes the next to advance. Micah is next to compete but only gets Gordon to say yes, but Gordon gives him his pass and Micah will battle again for a shot at an apron.
182	2	"Auditions - Pt. 2 / The Battle Round"	June 5, 2019	2.73
Auditions Round 2: Noah begins this day of auditions by earning an apron. Shari earns the next apron. A group of contestants is shown all missing the cut. Charli does not earn an apron but does earn a pass from Joe. Wuta and Evan are the next to earn aprons. Mollie is next and does not get an apron but Aarón gives his pass to her for a chance at the battle round. Fred earns the last regular apron. Micah, Charli and Mollie compete in the battle round for the last apron, and they have 45 minutes to make a different dish. Micah earns the final apron.
183	3	"Gordon's Mystery Box"	June 12, 2019	2.81
Skills Test: For their first challenge, the Top 20 had 10 minutes to dice three onions, filet a fish, and separate two dozen eggs. Bri, Deanna, Dorian, Evan, Kenny, Kimberly, Liz, Micah, Shari, and Wuta all failed to impress the judges, while the rest of the chefs were sent to safety.; Challenge Winners/Immune: Fred Chang, Jamie Hough, Keturah King, Michael Silverstein, Nick DiGiovanni, Noah Sims, Renee Rice, Sam Haaz, Sarah Faherty and Subha Ramiah; Mystery Box Challenge/Elimination Test: The remaining ten chefs had one hour to cook a dish using one of Ramsay's three favorite proteins; pork chop, scallops, and rack of lamb. Deanna, Evan, Kenny, Liz, and Wuta were in the bottom, and before another look at the dishes, Joe revealed that two chefs would be going home.; Bottom five: Deanna Colon, Evan Tesiny, Kenny Palazzolo, Liz Linn and Wuta Onda; Eliminated: Deanna Colon and Kenny Palazzolo
184	4	"10th Season Pool Party!"	June 19, 2019	2.74
Team Challenge: The contestants were taken to a mansion in Los Angeles where they are split into teams. Noah captains the Blue Team while Sarah captains the Red Team. The contestants assigned to the Blue Team are Bri, Evan, Fred, Keturah, Liz, Nick, Sam and Subha; all other contestants are assigned to the Red Team. Both teams must cook dishes for 100 VIP's and former MasterChef contestants and winners. The Blue Team were voted by the judges as the winners.; Challenge Winners: Bri Baker, Evan Tesiny, Fred Chang, Keturah King, Liz Linn, Nick DiGiovanni, Noah Sims, Sam Haaz and Subha Ramiah.; Noah is asked to nominate one member of his team to also face elimination along with the Red Team and he chooses Subha. The episode ends before the challenge airs.; Immune: Bri Baker, Evan Tesiny, Fred Chang, Keturah King, Liz Linn, Nick DiGiovanni, Noah Sims and Sam Haaz
185	5	"The Blind Chicken Show"	June 20, 2019	2.84
Pressure Test Part 1: For the first part of the pressure test, the Red Team and Subha had five minutes to perfectly cut a whole chicken. Dorian, Jamie and Michael had the best attempts and they were deemed safe.; Immune: Dorian Hunter, Jamie Hough and Michael Silverstein; Pressure Test Part 2: The remaining home cooks had 45 minutes to cook a chicken dish with the chicken they just cut. Wuta, Renee, and Kimberly were in the bottom three.; Bottom three: Kimberly White, Renee Rice and Wuta Onda; Eliminated: Kimberly White
186	6	"Hot & Spicy"	June 26, 2019	2.61
Mystery Box Challenge: Alessandra Ambrosio joined the judges to introduce the challenge. The contestants had one hour to cook a dish featuring at least one of Latin American cuisine's staple proteins. After thirty minutes of cooking time, the judges also asked them to make a ceviche to accompany their dish. Fred, Sam, and Liz were declared as having the worst dishes while Evan, Michael, Shari, Nick, Bri, and Wuta were called to the front for having the best dishes of the night. The judges granted Shari, Nick, and Wuta immunity while the rest had to face elimination next episode.; Challenge Winners/Immune: Nick DiGiovanni, Shari Mukherjee and Wuta Onda.
187	7	"Gordon Takes on a Tarte"	June 27, 2019	2.93
Elimination Test: The remaining contestants had one hour to bake a fruit tarte tatin. Michael’s dish was deemed the best. Bri, Dorian, Liz, Renee, Noah, Jamie and Micah also did well enough to move on. The bottom three dishes belonged to Evan, Fred and Sam.; Challenge Winner: Michael Silverstein; Bottom three: Evan Tesiny, Fred Chang and Sam Haaz; Eliminated: Evan Tesiny
188	8	"Joe Takes a Risk"	July 10, 2019	3.10
Team Challenge: The judges select team captains; Michael captains the Blue Team and Nick captains the Red Team. The Blue Team members are Dorian, Liz, Noah, Sam, Sarah, Shari and Subha; while the Red Team members are Bri, Fred, Jamie, Keturah, Micah, Renee and Wuta. The captains are taken to one of Bastianich's restaurants where they are given lessons and instructions on preparing a three-course meal. The captains are then taken back to their teams and they must teach the teams how to make the dishes. The teams must cook three portions of each course within one hour. The Red Team wins the challenge.; Challenge Winners/Immune: Bri Baker, Fred Chang, Jamie Hough, Keturah King, Micah Yaroch, Nick DiGiovanni, Renee Rice and Wuta Onda.
189	9	"Tag Team Tears & Tantrums"	July 11, 2019	3.12
Team Challenge/Elimination Test: The remaining eight contestants have 75 minutes to replicate a platter of six dishes and make a dish of their own in pairs with the teammates switching out every ten minutes in a tag team challenge. Nick gets to decide the pairs. Sam is paired with Shari, Dorian with Subha, Noah with Sarah and Liz with Michael. No winning dish was announced, but Noah and Sarah along with Dorian and Subha were deemed safe. The remaining pairs were in the bottom four.; Challenge Winners: None; Bottom four: Liz Linn, Michael Silverstein, Sam Haaz and Shari Mukherjee; Eliminated: Liz Linn and Michael Silverstein
190	10	"Gerron's Wedding"	July 17, 2019	3.09
Team Challenge: The judges select team captains; Bri captains the Blue Team and Wuta captains the Red Team. Wuta chooses Noah, Jamie, Micah, Sarah, Dorian and Keturah; while Bri chooses Fred, Nick, Shari, Sam, Renee and Subha. The contestants cater for the wedding reception of season nine winner Gerron Hurt to be held in the MasterChef kitchen. They are required to prepare dishes for 45 guests in 90 minutes. The Blue Team wins the challenge.; Challenge Winners/Immune: Bri Baker, Fred Chang, Nick DiGiovanni, Renee Rice, Sam Haaz, Shari Mukherjee and Subha Ramiah.
191	11	"Backyard BBQ"	July 18, 2019	2.98
Elimination Test: The remaining contestants have 60 minutes to cook a beef dish using an outdoor gas grill. The winning dish will be featured on the Beef. It's What's for Dinner website. After 30 minutes of cooking time, the judges also asked them to make a grilled dessert to accompany their dish. Sarah’s dish was deemed the best. Dorian, Jamie and Micah also did well enough to move on. The bottom three dishes belonged to Keturah, Noah and Wuta.; Challenge Winner: Sarah Faherty; Bottom three: Keturah King, Noah Sims and Wuta Onda; Eliminated: Keturah King
192	12	"King of the Crabs"	July 24, 2019	3.25
Skills Test: Masaharu Morimoto joined the judges to introduce the challenge. The contestants had one hour to cook a dish featuring Alaskan king crab. The home cook who makes the winning dish will receive an invitation from Morimoto to dine in one of his restaurants. Wuta, Nick, Shari, Fred, Dorian and Micah were called to the front for having the best dishes of the night. Fred’s dish was deemed the best. The judges granted Shari, Micah, and Fred immunity while the rest had to face elimination next episode.; Challenge Winner/Immune: Fred Chang; Immune: Micah Yaroch and Shari Mukherjee
193	13	"Someone's Toast"	July 25, 2019	3.24
Mystery Box Challenge/Elimination Test: The remaining ten home cooks had one hour to cook a savory dish and a sweet dish featuring bread. Dorian’s dishes were deemed the best. The bottom three dishes belonged to Bri, Renee and Sam. The remaining contestants were deemed safe.; Challenge Winner: Dorian Hunter; Bottom three: Bri Baker, Renee Rice and Sam Haaz; Eliminated: Sam Haaz
194	14	"Let Them Eat Cake"	July 31, 2019	3.11
Skills Test/Elimination Test: The judges announce one home cook will be eliminated in this challenge. The contestants randomly draw numbered candles to pick a cake of their choice. They have 75 minutes to replicate their specific cake. The home cook who makes the winning dish will receive $5,000 worth of Breville countertop appliances. Dorian’s dish was deemed the best and the judges granted her immunity while the rest had to face elimination next episode. The bottom three dishes belonged to Bri, Nick and Renee.; Challenge Winner/Immune: Dorian Hunter; Bottom three: Bri Baker, Nick DiGiovanni and Renee Rice; Eliminated: Renee Rice
195	15	"Small Dessert, Big Problems"	August 1, 2019	3.34
Elimination Test: Candace Nelson joins the judges for this challenge. The chefs have one hour to make one dozen macarons with at least two different flavors. Noah, Bri, Micah, Nick, Wuta and Subha all fail to impress while the remaining contestants are sent to safety.; Bottom six: Bri Baker, Micah Yaroch, Nick DiGiovanni, Noah Sims, Subha Ramiah and Wuta Onda; Eliminated: Wuta Onda
196	16	"NASCAR - Finish Line Feed"	August 7, 2019	3.39
Team Challenge: The contestants were taken to the Irwindale Speedway, where the home cooks themselves have to split into teams. Shari captains the Blue Team and chooses Bri, Fred, Nick and Noah, while Micah captains the Red Team with Dorian, Jamie, Sarah and Subha. After a guest appearance from driver Bobby Labonte, both teams had 75 minutes to cook dishes for 100 race car drivers and crew members. The Red Team were voted by the judges as the winners.; Challenge Winners: Dorian Hunter, Jamie Hough, Micah Yaroch, Sarah Faherty and Subha Ramiah.; Micah is asked to nominate one member of his team to also face elimination along with the Blue Team. The episode ends before Micah's decision airs.
197	17	"Box in a Box in a Box"	August 8, 2019	2.85
Mystery Box Challenge/Elimination Test: Micah chooses to send Subha to the elimination test. The rest of the Red Team is safe. The Blue Team chefs and Subha have 45 minutes to create a dish that incorporates langoustines, a filet mignon, and black truffle. Subha, Noah, Shari, and Nick are all sent to safety.; Immune: Dorian Hunter, Jamie Hough, Micah Yaroch and Sarah Faherty; Bottom two: Bri Baker and Fred Chang; Eliminated: Fred Chang
198	18	"Mind Blowing Food"	August 14, 2019	2.94
Skills Test: Grant Achatz joins the judges for this episode. The contestants are told to make any dish they want in one hour but they must make it with unique and outstanding plating. The top three dishes belonged to Nick, Dorian and Bri, and Nick's dish is declared the winner. Nick also wins dinner for two at Achatz's restaurant Alinea.; Challenge Winner/Immune: Nick DiGiovanni
199	19	"Pigging Out"	August 15, 2019	3.00
Elimination Test: The remaining contestants had one hour to make their own sausage and create a dish featuring their sausage.; Eliminated: Jamie Hough
200	20	"One Pan Wonder"	August 21, 2019	3.14
Mystery Box Challenge/Elimination Test: Daphne Oz joins the judges in this episode. Joe notes that all of the top eight will be up for elimination this challenge. The contestants are asked to make a dish using only one cast-iron skillet in an hour, with the prize of their recipe being published on the Family Circle website. At 30 minutes remaining, Gordon joins the cooks and makes his own dish. Subha wins this challenge.; Challenge Winner/Immune: Subha Ramiah; Nick, Sarah, and Shari also gained immunity and were praised for their dishes. Dorian is sent to safety next. The bottom three are Bri, Noah, and Micah.; Bottom three: Bri Baker, Noah Sims, and Micah Yaroch; Eliminated: Bri Baker
201	21	"Family Reunion"	August 28, 2019	3.28
Immunity Challenge: The contestants received a visit from their loved ones. They had one hour to create a dish inspired by their loved ones, with three of them immune from the next challenge. Dorian, Sarah, and Shari had the best dishes and were sent to safety.; Challenge Winners/Immune: Dorian Hunter, Sarah Faherty, and Shari Mukherjee; Elimination Challenge: The remaining chefs had to recreate Ramsay's potato crusted sea bass dish, and had to follow his exact instructions and speed as he cooked alongside them. The chefs had to complete their dishes within 60 seconds of Ramsay finishing his. Micah and Subha were in the bottom two.; Bottom two: Micah Yaroch and Subha Ramiah; Eliminated: Micah Yaroch
202	22	"London Calling - Pt. 1"	September 4, 2019	3.16
Team Challenge: The contestants are flown to London, England where they are split into teams. Sarah captains the Blue Team with Dorian and Noah, while Nick captains the Red Team with Subha and Shari. They have 45 minutes to prepare and serve appetizers and another 45 minutes to prepare and serve entrees to a restaurant of 36 diners. The losing team will be up for elimination. The Blue Team wins the challenge.; Challenge Winners/Immune: Dorian Hunter, Noah Sims and Sarah Faherty; Bottom three: Nick DiGiovanni, Shari Mukherjee and Subha Ramiah; Eliminated: Shari Mukherjee and Subha Ramiah
203	23	"London Calling - Pt. 2"	September 11, 2019	3.32
Elimination Challenge: The contestants are taken to Hatfield House where they meet with Nigella Lawson. They have one hour to cook a venison dish. After 30 minutes, the judges announce that they must also prepare a trifle.; Bottom four: Dorian Hunter, Nick DiGiovanni, Noah Sims, and Sarah Faherty; Eliminated: Noah Sims
204	24	"The Finale - Pt. 1"	September 18, 2019	3.17
Finale: The three finalists will have one hour for each course to prepare three portions of their best appetizer, entrée, and dessert.; Appetizer: Nick serves a soft-shell crab with tomato and caper relish, pomme souffle and a tomato party cup. Dorian serves seared scallops with cornmeal tuille, sweet corn puree and pickled swiss chard. Sarah serves braised octopus with chorizo ragu, piquillo pepper puree and assyrtiko-chili vinaigrette.; The entrées begin cooking as the first hour ends with the judges announcing another twist to the format.
205	25	"The Finale - Pt. 2"	September 18, 2019	3.17
The surprise announcement is that one chef will be eliminated immediately after the entrée round.; Entrée: Dorian serves applewood smoked short rib with a potato and horseradish gratin. Nick serves steamed bass with squid ink and celery root puree and a black truffle and white asparagus salad. Sarah serves herb crusted rack of lamb with spring vegetable fricassee, fava bean puree and burgundy sauce.; Eliminated: Nick DiGiovanni; Dessert: Dorian serves a lemon blueberry tart with blueberry and cream cheese filling, a toasted meringue topping and pecan crust. Sarah serves a chocolate torte with orange zest ganache, cocoa nib tuile and blackberry port reduction.; Final two: Dorian Hunter and Sarah Faherty; Both Dorian and Sarah are awarded a complete set of Viking Range appliances and kitchenware. Dorian is named the winner of this year's MasterChef, winning her the $250,000, the trophy, and training at the three judges' restaurants.; MasterChef Winner: Dorian Hunter
