= David Williams (card game player) =

American poker player (born 1980)

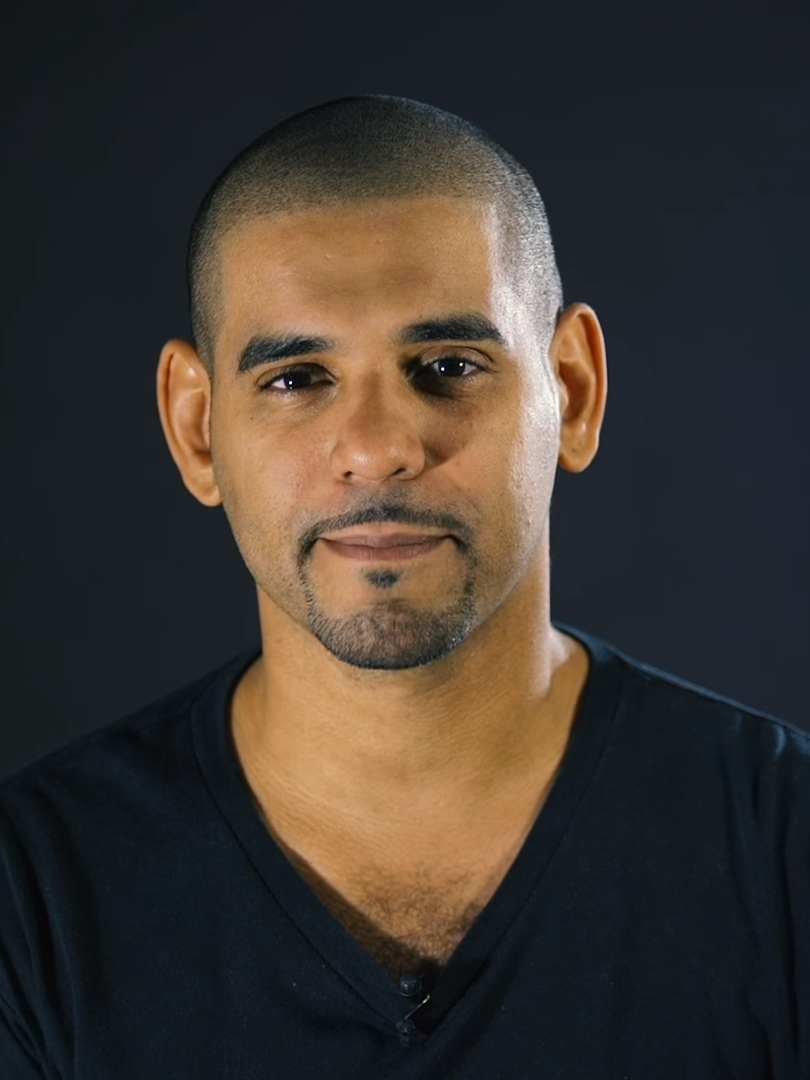
- Williams in 2018
- Born: David Anthony Williams; June 9, 1980 (age 46); Arlington, Texas, U.S.

World Series of Poker
- Bracelet: 1
- Money finishes: 19
- Highest WSOP Main Event finish: 2nd, 2004

World Poker Tour
- Title: 1
- Final tables: 5
- Money finishes: 17

David Anthony Williams (born June 9, 1980) is a professional poker and Magic: The Gathering player who also competed on Season 7 of the FOX cooking show MasterChef, where he finished as co-runner-up.

== Personal life ==
Williams was born in Arlington, Texas. At 16, he attended the Texas Academy of Mathematics and Science, a two-year early college entrance program at the University of North Texas. Later, he briefly attended Princeton University before switching to study economics at Southern Methodist University. Williams currently resides in Las Vegas, Nevada. Williams has one daughter, Liliana.

== Poker career ==
Williams's poker success was capped at the 2004 World Series of Poker. He won his buy-in through an online poker site and made it to the final table of the Main Event, ultimately finishing second to Greg Raymer, but still winning $3.5 million for the runner-up prize. Four months later, he finished second at the Borgata Open World Poker Tour, where he collected $573,800.

=== Live ===
==== Tournaments ====
As of 2026, his total live tournament winnings exceed $9,500,000. $5,506,498 of his live winnings have come at the WSOP, and most of the rest has come from the WPT.

===== World Series of Poker =====
Williams won his sole WSOP bracelet in 2006 in the $1,500 Seven-card stud event when his K♠ 3♥ 4♠ K♦ (6♠ 4♣ 8♥) defeated John Hoang's 4♣ 5♠ 9♦ 3♣ (A♦ 8♠ 10♠). His mother, Shirley Williams, often attends his poker events, and even competed in the 2006 WSOP Main Event, outlasting her son in the process.

World Series of Poker bracelets
Year	Tournament	Prize (US$)
2006	$1,500 Seven Card Stud	$163,118

===== World Poker Tour =====
In March 2006, Williams made a second WPT final table, finishing 4th for $280,000. Two months later, he made another WPT final table, again finishing 4th. In 2010, he won the WPT World Championship, defeating Eric Baldwin in heads-up play and winning over $1.5 million.

World Poker Tour Titles
Year	Tournament	Prize (US$)
2010	$25,000 WPT World Championship	$1,530,537

=== Online poker ===
Following the 2004 World Series of Poker, David Williams became a member of Team Bodog. Williams parted ways with Bodog after the 2010 WPT World Championship. In June 2010, Williams joined Team PokerStars as a sponsored pro.

==== Tournaments ====
===== World Championship of Online Poker =====
In 2009, Williams, playing under the screen name "RugDoctor", defeated poker professional Alexander "joiso" Kostritsyn to capture Event #42 ($2,100 8-Game) of the World Championship of Online Poker (WCOOP).

World Championship of Online Poker Titles
Year	Event	Tournament	Prize (US$)
2009	Event 42	$2,100 8-Game	$107,800

== Magic: The Gathering ==
David Williams
- Pro Tour wins (Top 8): 0 (1)^{*}
- Grand Prix wins (Top 8): 3 (9)
- Lifetime Pro Points: 177
- Planeswalker Level: 48 (Archmage)
- ^{*} Williams reached the Top 8 of 2001 Pro Tour Tokyo and the 2001 Worlds but was disqualified from the World Championship

Williams is an accomplished Magic player. His initial foray into Magic's Pro Tour came in the late 1990s. He made the Top 8 of eight Grand Prix events in cities such as San Diego, Cannes, Moscow, and Cleveland with Team Event wins in Yokohama and Taipei in 2001. He also made the top 8 of the first Pro Tour in Japan, finishing 7th at PT Tokyo 2001. He had already won over $30,000 playing Magic when he made the Top 8 of the 2001 World Championships in Toronto. However, he was disqualified without prize for marked cards because three of his four Accumulated Knowledge cards were bent more than the other cards in his deck, making them easier to cut to when Williams cut his own deck after his opponent shuffled it. The tournament's judging staff determined that the bending was not accidental and that Williams had cheated based on two criteria:

- Each time Williams cut his deck as part of pregame shuffling procedure, a copy of Accumulated Knowledge was on top.
- The judges were able to consistently cut his deck to a copy of Accumulated Knowledge.

Williams admitted that the cards were marked but disputed the determination that he cheated by marking them intentionally. Williams was suspended by the DCI from sanctioned Magic: The Gathering tournaments for one year. During this suspension, Williams started to focus more on Texas hold 'em, especially on the Internet. He made a successful comeback after his suspension was finished, and won money at several more Magic events, though his focus was mainly on poker.

Even though there is more money that can be made in professional poker than in professional Magic, Williams has said he will continue to play both games, although poker will take precedence. Like many who play both, he has asserted that the two are for different purposes: he plays Magic to have fun, and poker to make money.

== MasterChef ==
Williams competed as a contestant on the seventh season of the United States cooking competition MasterChef in 2016. He was one of three contestants to make it into the finals, ultimately losing to Shaun O'Neale and finishing as co-runner-up with Brandi Mudd. He had six total challenge wins during the season.
