= MasterChef (American TV series) season 11 =

Season of television series

MasterChef: Legends
- Season 11
- Promotional poster for season 11, featuring (L to R) Aarón Sánchez, Gordon Ramsay, and Joe Bastianich
- Judges: Gordon Ramsay; Aarón Sánchez; Joe Bastianich
- No. of contestants: 15
- Winner: Kelsey Murphy
- Runners-up: Autumn Moretti; Suu Khin
- No. of episodes: 18

Release
- Original network: Fox
- Original release: June 2 – September 15, 2021

Season chronology
- ← Previous; Season 10 Next → Season 12

The eleventh season of the American competitive reality television series MasterChef (also known as MasterChef: Legends) premiered on Fox on June 2, 2021, and concluded on September 15, 2021. Gordon Ramsay, Aarón Sánchez, and Joe Bastianich all returned as judges. The season was won by physical therapist Kelsey Murphy, with bartender Autumn Moretti and food blogger Suu Khin finishing as co-runners-up.

== Production ==
In July 2020, it was reported that the first half of an eleventh season had been filmed, with production shutting down in March due to the COVID-19 pandemic. Production on the season resumed on October 26, 2020. On April 7, 2021, it was announced that the season would premiere on June 2, 2021 and would feature culinary legend guests.

== Top 15 ==
Source for all first names, ages, hometowns, and occupations.

Contestant	Age	Hometown	Occupation	Status
Kelsey Murphy	32	Indianapolis, Indiana	Physical therapist	Winner September 15
Autumn Moretti	27	Boston, Massachusetts	Bartender	Runners-up September 15
Suu Khin	30	Houston, Texas	Food blogger	Runners-up September 15
Alejandro Valdivia	39	Atlanta, Georgia	Professional animal trainer	Eliminated September 8
Michael Newman	47	Asbury Park, New Jersey	Lifestyle coach	Eliminated September 1
Abe Konick	22	New York, New York	Student	Eliminated September 1
Anne Hicks	39	Kalamazoo, Michigan	Small business owner	Eliminated August 25
Joseph Manglicmot	32	Houston, Texas	Environmental engineer	Eliminated August 25
Lexy Rogers	23	Zion, Illinois	Stay-at-home mom	Eliminated August 18
Tay Westberry	29	Omaha, Nebraska	Radio host	Eliminated July 21
Miles Gateff	31	Frisco, Texas	YouTube gamer	Eliminated July 14
Matt Gagnon	36	Cromwell, Connecticut	Construction worker	Eliminated July 7
Mary Jayne Buckingham	59	Bastrop, Texas	Hospice nursing assistant	Withdrew July 7
Annai Gonzalez	25	Dallas, Texas	Legal assistant	Eliminated June 30
Elyce Wooten	39	Chicago, Illinois	Salon owner	Eliminated June 23

== Elimination table ==
Place	Contestant	Episode															
Place	Contestant	4	5	6	7	8	9	10	11	12	13	14		15	16		17/18
1	Kelsey	WIN	IN	HIGH	HIGH	IN	HIGH	IN	WIN	WIN	WIN	IN	LOW	WIN	IMM	IMM	WINNER
2	Autumn	HIGH	IN	IN	WIN	HIGH	IN	IN	IN	IN	WIN	IN	IN	IN	WIN	IMM	RUNNERS-UP
2	Suu	HIGH	IN	IN	IN	WIN	IN	IN	IN	LOW	WIN	IN	WIN	IN	IN	WIN	RUNNERS-UP
4	Alejandro	LOW	IN	IN	LOW	LOW	IN	IN	IN	IN	LOW	WIN	IMM	IN	IN	ELIM	
5	Michael	IN	HIGH	IN	LOW	IN	IN	IN	IN	LOW	LOW	IN	ELIM				
6	Abe	IN	LOW	WIN	IN	HIGH	IN	LOW	WIN	IN	ELIM						
7	Anne	IN	HIGH	LOW	HIGH	IN	IN	LOW	LOW	ELIM							
8	Joseph	IN	IN	HIGH	IN	LOW	WIN	IMM	ELIM								
9	Lexy	IN	HIGH	LOW	HIGH	IN	HIGH	ELIM									
10	Tay	IN	WIN	IN	IN	ELIM											
11	Miles	IN	IN	IN	ELIM												
12	Matt	IN	LOW	ELIM													
13	Mary Jayne	IN	IN	WDR													
14	Annai	LOW	ELIM														
15	Elyce	ELIM															

(WINNER) This cook won the competition.
(RUNNER-UP) This cook finished as a runner-up in the finals.
(WIN) The cook won the individual challenge (Mystery Box Challenge/ Skills Test or Elimination Test).
(WIN) The cook was on the winning team in the Team Challenge and directly advanced to the next round.
(HIGH) The cook was one of the top entries in the individual challenge but didn't win.
(IN) The cook wasn't selected as a top or bottom entry in an individual challenge.
(IN) The cook wasn't selected as a top or bottom entry in a team challenge.
(IMM) The cook didn't have to compete in that round of the competition and was safe from elimination.
(LOW) The cook was one of the bottom entries in an individual challenge, and they advanced.
(LOW) The cook was one of the bottom entries in the Team Challenge and they advanced.
(WDR) The cook withdrew from the competition.
(ELIM) The cook was eliminated from MasterChef.

== Episodes ==
No. overall	No. in season	Title	Original release date	Prod. code	U.S. viewers (millions)
206	1	"Legends: Emeril Lagasse - Auditions Round 1"	June 2, 2021	MCH-1101	2.55
Ramsay opens the show explaining that various culinary legends will be on every episode of this season, and that this year only 15 people will receive the traditional white apron and become contestants. This year's prize includes the usual trophy and $250,000 cash, but also includes kitchen appliances from Viking Range. For the first round of auditions, the judges are joined by Emeril Lagasse and the potential contestants must get approval from at least three of the four judges to qualify. Season 10 winner Dorian Hunter and finalists Sarah Faherty and Nick DiGiovanni will assist the audition process; each person will have 45 minutes to prepare their dish. An unnamed female and an unnamed male both fail, but Alejandro gets four yeses. Mother Jen and daughter Cailin both fail. Matt is next and gets three out of four yeses, followed by Autumn who gets four yeses. Miles is up next and gets three out of four yeses followed by Elyce who gets four yeses. The last entrant is Suu who gets four yeses. The episode ended with a dedication to MasterChef Junior season six contestant Ben Watkins, who had passed away.
207	2	"Legends: Curtis Stone - Auditions Round 2"	June 9, 2021	MCH-1102	2.55
After a recap of the last episode, Curtis Stone joins the regular judges for this round of auditions. Anne is up first and gets three out of four yeses. Brit and Bernardo both fail. Josey fails but Aarón Sánchez offers her training at his restaurant in New Orleans. Abe is up next and gets three out of four yeses. Joseph comes out of judging with an apron; although it is not shown directly how many yeses he received, all four judges praised his dish. Nayha fails her audition. Annai is the last entrant of the day and gets four yeses.
208	3	"Legends: Paula Deen - Auditions Round 3"	June 16, 2021	MCH-1103	2.51
This week's guest judge is Paula Deen for the final batch of auditions. At this point only five aprons are left to be awarded. Brittany and Michael both fail with their dishes. Kelsey succeeds with four yeses. Lexy gets three out of four yeses. Tay follows with three out of four yeses. Mary Jayne gets four yeses. Alan fails his audition, but Aarón gives him a scholarship to culinary school. With the last apron on the line, Cathleen and Michael are the last to audition. Cathleen fails while Michael gets the last apron; it is not shown how many judges said yes to him.
209	4	"Legends: Chef Morimoto - Monkfish Challenge"	June 23, 2021	MCH-1104	2.82
Elimination Test: Masaharu Morimoto joins the judges this week as he filets a monkfish for the contestants. They have one hour to cook their best dish using the monkfish filets. The three best dishes belong to Kelsey, Autumn, and Suu; and Kelsey wins the challenge, also winning dinner for two at Morimoto's restaurant. The bottom three dishes belong to Annai, Alejandro, and Elyce.; Challenge winner: Kelsey Murphy; Bottom three: Alejandro Valdivia, Annai Gonzalez and Elyce Wooten; Eliminated: Elyce Wooten
210	5	"Legends: Sherry Yard - Dessert Challenge"	June 30, 2021	MCH-1105	2.84
Elimination Test: This week, Sherry Yard joins the judges to set the contestants' next challenge. They are given 90 minutes to make a dessert of their choice. The four best dishes belong to Tay, Lexy, Anne, and Michael, and Tay wins the challenge, also winning a complete set of Breville kitchen appliances. The bottom three dishes belong to Annai, Matt, and Abe.; Challenge winner: Tay Westberry; Bottom three: Abe Konick, Annai Gonzalez and Matt Gagnon; Eliminated: Annai Gonzalez
211	6	"Legends: Michael Mina - Meat Roulette"	July 7, 2021	MCH-1106	2.61
Mystery Box Challenge: Gordon announces that Mary Jayne has withdrawn from the competition due to illness. Michael Mina joins the judges this week for the first mystery box challenge. They are given one hour to cook a beef dish using the beef cut under their box. The three best dishes belong to Abe, Joseph, and Kelsey, and Abe wins the challenge, also winning dinner for two at Mina's restaurant. The bottom three dishes belong to Anne, Lexy, and Matt.; Withdrew: Mary Jayne Buckingham; Challenge winner: Abe Konick; Bottom three: Anne Hicks, Lexy Rogers and Matt Gagnon; Eliminated: Matt Gagnon
212	7	"Legends: Nancy Silverton - Pasta Challenge"	July 14, 2021	MCH-1107	2.67
Elimination Test: This week, Nancy Silverton joins the judges to set the contestants' next challenge. They are given one hour to cook a pasta dish. The four best dishes belong to Autumn, Anne, Kelsey, and Lexy, and Autumn wins the challenge, also winning dinner for two at Silverton's restaurant. The bottom three dishes belong to Michael, Alejandro and Miles.; Challenge winner: Autumn Moretti; Bottom three: Alejandro Valdivia, Michael Newman and Miles Gateff; Eliminated: Miles Gateff
213	8	"Legends: Jonathan Waxman - California Mystery Box"	July 21, 2021	MCH-1108	2.42
Mystery Box Challenge: The top 10 contestants are joined by Jonathan Waxman for their second mystery box challenge of the season. They are given one hour to create a dish using all five California inspired ingredients picked out by Waxman. The three best dishes belong to Suu, Abe, and Autumn, and Suu wins the challenge, also winning dinner for four at Chef Waxman's New York City restaurant, Barbuto. The bottom three dishes belong to Alejandro, Tay, and Joseph.; Challenge winner: Suu Khin; Bottom three: Alejandro Valdivia, Joseph Manglicmot and Tay Westberry; Joseph was initially called out for having the worst dish, but Tay was eliminated from the competition instead for missing one of the five required ingredients in his dish.; Eliminated: Tay Westberry
214	9	"Legends: Roy Choi - Elevated Street Food"	August 11, 2021	MCH-1109	2.37
Immunity Challenge: Roy Choi joins the top nine for their next challenge. They are given one hour to make an elevated version of a street food dish of their choice. The three best dishes belong to Kelsey, Joseph, and Lexy, and Joseph wins the challenge, also winning dinner for two at Choi's restaurant and immunity from the following challenge.; Challenge winner/Immune: Joseph Manglicmot; Ramsay announces that on the next episode, the remaining contestants will be competing in an elimination challenge.
215	10	"Legends: Cook for Your Legend"	August 18, 2021	MCH-1110	2.40
Elimination Test: Joseph is immune from this challenge. The remaining chefs must prepare any dish that is inspired by their personal legend, whoever that may be to them. They have one hour to prepare their dish. The bottom three dishes belong to Abe, Lexy, and Anne.; Bottom three: Abe Konick, Anne Hicks and Lexy Rogers; Eliminated: Lexy Rogers
216	11	"Legends: Dominique Crenn - The Wall"	August 25, 2021	MCH-1111	2.41
Team Challenge: The top eight are joined by Dominique Crenn for their first team challenge. They are split into four teams of two: the Grey Team (Michael and Autumn), Orange Team (Anne and Joseph), Green Team (Alejandro and Suu), and the Blue Team (Abe and Kelsey). The teams are each given one hour to cook a dish of their choice, but both members are separated by a wall and must rely on communication in order to cook identical dishes. The Blue Team won the challenge, while the Orange Team were at the bottom.; Challenge winners: Abe Konick and Kelsey Murphy; Bottom two: Anne Hicks and Joseph Manglicmot; Eliminated: Joseph Manglicmot
217	12	"Legends: Niki Nakayama - Kaiseki"	August 25, 2021	MCH-1112	2.41
Elimination Test: The top seven are joined by Niki Nakayama and the contestants are asked to create a kaiseki in one hour, consisting of a steamed, fried and grilled dish. Kelsey is deemed the winner of the challenge. Suu, Anne and Michael are the bottom three.; Challenge winner: Kelsey Murphy; Bottom three: Anne Hicks, Michael Newman and Suu Khin; Eliminated: Anne Hicks
218	13	"Legends: Dinner"	September 1, 2021	MCH-1113	2.26
Team Challenge: The top six are joined by four guest judges for their next challenge: Jonathan Yao, Tanya Holland, Val Cantu and Sherry Yard. They are split into two teams of three: Alejandro captains the Blue Team with Michael and Abe, while Autumn captains the Red Team with Kelsey and Suu. The teams are tasked with preparing a two-course meal consisting of an appetizer and entree, with 45 minutes to cook each course. The Red Team wins the challenge while the Blue Team are at the bottom.; Challenge winners: Autumn Moretti, Kelsey Murphy, and Suu Khin; Bottom three: Abe Konick, Alejandro Valdivia and Michael Newman; Eliminated: Abe Konick
219	14	"Legends: Ludo Lefebvre - Timed Out Mystery Box"	September 1, 2021	MCH-1114	2.26
Mystery Box Challenge: Ludo Lefebvre joins the judges as this week's guest. The contestants are given a mystery box and inside the box is a timer with 75 minutes on it. The challenge is split into two rounds and they must prepare a French bistro-style dish; the contestants are allowed to use as much time they want on their first dish, but if they do not impress the judges with that first dish, they must use their remaining time to make a second dish to avoid elimination. Alejandro wins the first round and is immune from further cooking in this challenge.; Challenge Winner/Immune: Alejandro Valdivia; When the remaining cooking time ends, Suu has the best dish of the second round. The bottom two are Kelsey and Michael.; Challenge Winner: Suu Khin; Bottom two: Kelsey Murphy and Michael Newman; Eliminated: Michael Newman
220	15	"Legends: Semi Final - 3 Chef Showdown"	September 8, 2021	MCH-1115	2.55
Immunity Challenge (Part One): The four contestants must cook alongside three guest chefs in three rounds, and they must cook that chef's dish with the same speed and technique as the guest chef. Once the guest chef finishes cooking, the contestants have ten seconds to plate their dish. The winner of the round will have immunity for the remaining rounds. For the first round, the guest chef is Nyesha Arrington. Kelsey wins this first round.; Winner/Immune: Kelsey Murphy; Immunity Challenge (Part Two): The other three contestants continue to cook with the second round guest chef Suzette Gresham. The episode ends with this round in progress.
221	16	"Legends: Semi Final Pt 2 - 3 Chef Showdown"	September 8, 2021	MCH-1116	2.55
Immunity Challenge (Part Two): The contestants continue to cook with Suzette Gresham. Autumn wins this second round.; Winner/Immune: Autumn Moretti; Elimination Challenge: Alejandro and Suu compete for the last spot in the finale by cooking in the third round with Gordon Ramsay, and in this round they will have 15 seconds to plate their dish when Ramsay finishes.; Bottom two: Alejandro Valdivia and Suu Khin; Winner: Suu Khin; Eliminated: Alejandro Valdivia
222	17	"Legends: Finale - Curtis Stone"	September 15, 2021	MCH-1117	2.53
Finale The judges announce that all three finalists have already won a range from Viking Range and a package of kitchen tools from OXO. Curtis Stone returns as a guest judge. The three finalists are tasked with preparing and serving a three-course menu consisting of an appetizer, entreé, and dessert, with one hour to cook each course. A few minutes into the appetizer course, the judges introduce a twist: they must instead start by preparing ten canapés in 30 minutes for the judges and six of their fellow contestants.; Canapé: Kelsey serves beef tartare with toasted brioche crostini and fried caper. Suu serves beef and tomato curry puffs with tamarind sauce. Autumn serves uni toast with soft scrambled eggs and caviar, uni and chive.; Appetizer: Autumn serves a pork & spot prawn dumpling with prawn dashi, salmon roe and fried prawn head. Suu serves a Burmese chickpea tofu salad with baby octopus, tamarind-fish sauce caramel, red cabbage slaw and crispy lotus chips. Kelsey serves lobster & crab ravioli with blood orange & saffron nage, basil oil and caviar.
223	18	"Legends: Finale Pt 2 - Michael Cimarusti"	September 15, 2021	MCH-1118	2.53
Michael Cimarusti joins the judges for these last two courses of the finale.; Entreé: Kelsey serves a crispy-skinned duck breast with a honeynut purée, cherry bigarade sauce, caramelized endive and pearl onions. Suu serves a banana leaf wrapped grilled seabass with coconut rice, banana ketchup, grilled shishito peppers, and an herb salad. Autumn serves a broiled miso cod with uni risotto, burdock root chips, fried maitake mushrooms and grilled scallion.; Dessert: Suu serves rose flan cake with saffron and cardamom ice cream, pistachio tuile and pistachio dust topped with rose petals frozen in liquid nitrogen done at the table. Autumn serves a Japanese jiggly yuzu cheesecake with strawberry coulis, yuzu curd, topped with strawberries and gold flake. Kelsey serves a blueberry and lavender panna cotta with a lemon curd, lemon sablé and a sablé cookie crumble.; Final three: Autumn Moretti, Kelsey Murphy and Suu Khin; Kelsey is named the winner of this season's MasterChef, winning her the $250,000, the trophy, and a full set of appliances from Viking Range.; MasterChef Winner: Kelsey Murphy
