= MasterChef (American TV series) season 8 =

Season of television series

MasterChef
- Season 8
- Promotional poster for season 8, featuring (L to R) Aarón Sánchez, Gordon Ramsay, and Christina Tosi.
- Judges: Gordon Ramsay; Christina Tosi; Aarón Sánchez
- No. of contestants: 20
- Winner: Dino Angelo Luciano
- Runners-up: Eboni Henry; Jason Wang
- No. of episodes: 21

Release
- Original network: Fox
- Original release: May 31 – September 20, 2017

Season chronology
- ← Previous; Season 7 Next → Season 9

The eighth season of the American competitive reality television series MasterChef premiered on Fox on May 31, 2017, and concluded on September 20, 2017.

Gordon Ramsay and Christina Tosi returned as judges, while Aarón Sánchez joined the cast this season as the third judge.

This season was won by Dino Angelo Luciano with Eboni Henry and Jason Wang finishing as co-runners-up.

== Top 20 ==
Source for names, hometowns and occupations: Ages and nicknames as given on air.

| Contestant | Age | Hometown | Occupation | Status |
|---|---|---|---|---|
| Dino Angelo Luciano | 28 | Bensonhurst, New York | Dancer | Winner September 20 |
| Eboni Henry | 33 | Chicago, Illinois | Addiction Counselor | Runners-Up September 20 |
| Jason Wang | 34 | Newton, Massachusetts | High School Music Teacher | Runners-Up September 20 |
| Caitlin "Cate" Meade | 25 | Chicago, Illinois | Nutritionist | Eliminated September 13 |
| Jeff Philbin | 29 | Tampa, Florida | Marketing Director | Eliminated September 13 |
| Yachecia Holston | 43 | Detroit, Michigan | Minister | Eliminated September 13 |
| Gabriel Lewis | 19 | Oklahoma City, Oklahoma | Fast Food Server | Eliminated September 6 |
| Daniel Pontes-Macedo | 31 | Medford, Massachusetts | Substitute Teacher | Eliminated August 30 |
| Caitlin Jones | 24 | Pittsburgh, Pennsylvania | Dancer | Eliminated August 30 |
| Adam Wong | 21 | Cambridge, Massachusetts | Harvard Student | Eliminated August 23 |
| Jenny Cavellier | 25 | Cincinnati, Ohio | Special Needs Therapist | Eliminated August 23 |
| Mike "Newton" Newton | 53 | Lipan, Texas | Ranch Owner | Eliminated August 16^{1} |
| Reba Billingsley | 48 | Carthage, Texas | Stay-at-home Mom | Eliminated August 9 |
| Brien O'Brien | 32 | Redding, California | Magazine Ad Sales | Eliminated August 2 |
| Necco Ceresani | 26 | Newberry, South Carolina | Marketing Manager | Eliminated July 26 |
| Jennifer Williams | 25 | Chalmette, Louisiana | Debt Collector | Eliminated July 19 |
| Sam Reiff-Pasarew | 37 | Washington, D.C. | Creative Writing Teacher | Eliminated July 12 |
| Heather Dombrosky | 37 | Miami, Florida | Registered Nurse | Eliminated June 28 |
| Paige Jimenez | 18 | Honolulu, Hawaii | Swimsuit Model | Eliminated June 21 |
| Mark Togni | 43 | Portland, Oregon | Stay-at-home Dad | Eliminated June 14 |

^Note 1 While Mike Newton's elimination occurred from the events on Episode 11 (August 16), his elimination was not revealed until Episode 12 (August 23).

== Elimination table ==
| Place | Contestant | Episodes | | | | | | | | | | | | | | | | | | | | | | | | | | | | | | |
| Place | Contestant | 3 | | 4 | 5 | | | 6 | | 7 | 8 | | 9 | 10 | | 11 | 12 | | 13 | | 14 | | 15 | 16 | | 17 | 18 | | 19 | | | 20/21 |
|---|---|---|---|---|---|---|---|---|---|---|---|---|---|---|---|---|---|---|---|---|---|---|---|---|---|---|---|---|---|---|---|---|
| 1 | Dino | IN | IMM | PT | IN | LOW | IN | IN | IMM | NPT | IN | IMM | PT | IN | WIN | WIN | IN | IMM | IN | IMM | IN | WIN | PT | WIN | IMM | WIN | IN | IN | IN | IN | WIN | WINNER |
| 2 | Eboni | IN | IMM | WIN | IN | IN | IMM | LOW | IN | WIN | IN | IN | PT | IN | IN | WIN | LOW | IN | WIN | IMM | IN | IN | WIN | IN | WIN | PT | HIGH | IN | IN | WIN | IMM | RUNNERS-UP |
| 2 | Jason | IN | IMM | WIN | WIN | IMM | IMM | IN | IMM | NPT | IN | LOW | WIN | IN | IN | WIN | IN | IMM | IN | IMM | WIN | IMM | WIN | HIGH | WIN | WIN | IN | IN | WIN | IMM | IMM | RUNNERS-UP |
| 4 | Cate | IN | IMM | WIN | IN | IN | IMM | WIN | IMM | WIN | IN | WIN | WIN | WIN | IMM | WIN | IN | IMM | WIN | IMM | HIGH | WIN | WIN | IN | IN | PT | WIN | IMM | IN | IN | ELIM | |
| 5 | Jeff | IN | IMM | NPT | HIGH | LOW | IN | IN | IMM | NPT | HIGH | IN | LOW | IN | LOW | NPT | LOW | IN | IN | IMM | IN | LOW | LOW | HIGH | IN | PT | IN | ELIM | | | | |
| 5 | Yachecia | HIGH | IMM | WIN | IN | LOW | IN | WIN | IMM | LOW | IN | WIN | NPT | HIGH | IN | LOW | IN | IMM | IN | IMM | IN | IN | LOW | IN | LOW | WIN | HIGH | ELIM | | | | |
| 7 | Gabriel | IN | IMM | PT | IN | IN | IMM | IN | IMM | WIN | IN | LOW | WIN | IN | IN | NPT | LOW | IN | IN | IMM | HIGH | IN | WIN | IN | ELIM | | | | | | | |
| 8 | Daniel | IN | IMM | NPT | IN | IN | IMM | IN | IMM | WIN | IN | IMM | WIN | IN | WIN | NPT | IN | IMM | IN | IMM | IN | IN | ELIM | | | | | | | | | |
| 9 | Caitlin | IN | IMM | PT | IN | LOW | IN | LOW | IN | NPT | IN | IMM | WIN | HIGH | LOW | NPT | LOW | IN | LOW | LOW | IN | ELIM | | | | | | | | | | |
| 10 | Adam | IN | IMM | WIN | IN | IN | IMM | IN | IMM | WIN | IN | IMM | LOW | IN | IN | WIN | LOW | LOW | LOW | ELIM | | | | | | | | | | | | |
| 11 | Jenny | IN | IMM | PT | IN | IN | IMM | LOW | IN | NPT | IN | IMM | WIN | IN | IN | WIN | LOW | ELIM | | | | | | | | | | | | | | |
| 12 | Newton | IN | IMM | WIN | IN | IN | IMM | LOW | LOW | WIN | WIN | IMM | PT | IN | LOW | ELIM | | | | | | | | | | | | | | | | |
| 13 | Reba | IN | IMM | NPT | IN | IN | IMM | IN | IMM | NPT | IN | IMM | WIN | IN | ELIM | | | | | | | | | | | | | | | | | |
| 14 | Brien | WIN | IMM | WIN | IN | IN | IMM | IN | IMM | WIN | HIGH | IMM | ELIM | | | | | | | | | | | | | | | | | | | |
| 15 | Necco | IN | IMM | WIN | HIGH | IN | IMM | IN | IMM | WIN | IN | ELIM | | | | | | | | | | | | | | | | | | | | |
| 16 | Jennifer | HIGH | IMM | LOW | IN | IN | IMM | LOW | IN | ELIM | | | | | | | | | | | | | | | | | | | | | | |
| 17 | Sam | LOW | IN | WIN | IN | LOW | LOW | LOW | ELIM | | | | | | | | | | | | | | | | | | | | | | | |
| 18 | Heather | LOW | IN | WIN | IN | LOW | ELIM | | | | | | | | | | | | | | | | | | | | | | | | | |
| 19 | Paige | IN | IMM | ELIM | | | | | | | | | | | | | | | | | | | | | | | | | | | | |
| 20 | Mark | LOW | ELIM | | | | | | | | | | | | | | | | | | | | | | | | | | | | | |

(WINNER) This cook won the competition.
(RUNNER-UP) This cook finished as a runner-up in the finals.
(WIN) The cook won the individual challenge (Mystery Box Challenge / Skills Test or Elimination Test).
(WIN) The cook was on the winning team in the Team Challenge and directly advanced to the next round.
(HIGH) The cook was one of the top entries in the individual challenge but didn't win.
(IN) The cook wasn't selected as a top or bottom entry in an individual challenge.
(IN) The cook wasn't selected as a top or bottom entry in a team challenge.
(IMM) The cook didn't have to compete in that round of the competition and was safe from elimination.
(IMM) The cook was selected by Mystery Box Challenge winner and didn't have to compete in the Elimination Test.
(PT) The cook was on the losing team in the Team Challenge, competed in the Pressure Test, and advanced.
(NPT) The cook was on the losing team in the Team Challenge, did not compete in the Pressure Test, and advanced.
(LOW) The cook was one of the bottom entries in an individual challenge or the Pressure Test, but advanced.
(LOW) The cook was one of the bottom entries in the Team Challenge, but advanced.
(ELIM) The cook was eliminated from MasterChef.

== Episodes ==
| No. overall | No. in season | Title | Original release date | U.S. viewers (millions) |
|---|---|---|---|---|
| 137 | 1 | "Battle for a White Apron, Part 1" | May 31, 2017 | 3.67 |
Auditions Round 1: The amateur cooks will be competing for a white apron and to be a contestant in this year's MasterChef, and the judges will be selecting their themes. Yachecia wins over Shawn in fried chicken, and Jason wins over Ty in a scallop battle. In a compilation video, Caitlin, Paige, Jenny, Sam, Necco, and Mark all receive white aprons. Julia, Adam, Gabriel, and David compete with tacos with Gabriel and Adam winning aprons. Paola and Reba compete with duck dishes and Reba wins.
| 138 | 2 | "Battle for a White Apron, Part 2" | June 7, 2017 | 3.19 |
Auditions Round 2: The first battle in this episode is between Josh and Dino in veal parmigiana. Dino is the winner. The next battle features Taylor and Cate, who auditioned last season but lost to their respective opponents and failed to win aprons, in salmon. Cate is declared the winner. Michael, Brien, Daniel, and Aakash battle in steak. Brien and Daniel win aprons. In a montage, Jeff, Eboni, Heather, and Jennifer receive aprons. Newton and Tom battle in cupcakes. Newton wins, earning him the final white apron and the final spot in the top 20.
| 139 | 3 | "America's Grocery Bag" | June 14, 2017 | 3.73 |
Mystery Box Challenge: The 20 contestants are given a brown grocery bag filled with 12 of the most common grocery items, and must create a dish based on them in one hour. Sam, Heather, and Mark are called out first but are told they are the bottom three. Yachecia, Jennifer, and Brien are called out as the top three, and Brien wins the challenge.; Challenge Winner/Immune: Brien O'Brien; Bottom three: Heather Dombrosky, Mark Togni, Sam Reiff-Pasarew; Elimination Challenge: The judges announce that all other contestants except the bottom three are immune from the next challenge. Heather, Mark, and Sam are given the exact same bag of ingredients and may either improve on their previous dish or attempt to make a new one in 45 minutes.; Immune: Adam Wong, Caitlin Jones, Caitlin Meade, Daniel Pontes-Macedo, Dino Luciano, Eboni Henry, Gabriel Lewis, Jason Wang, Jeff Philbin, Jennifer Williams, Jenny Cavellier, Mike Newton, Necco Ceresani, Paige Jimenez, Reba Billingsley, Yachecia Holston; Eliminated: Mark Togni
| 140 | 4 | "Feeding the Lifeguards" | June 21, 2017 | 3.34 |
Team Challenge: The 19 contestants are brought to a beach to cook a fish lunch for 101 lifeguards. They split into two teams; the Red Team (Adam, team captain Brien, Cate, Eboni, Heather, Jason, Necco, Newton, Sam, and Yachecia); and the Blue Team (Caitlin, Daniel, Dino, Gabriel, Jeff, team captain Jennifer, Jenny, Paige, and Reba). The Red Team wins with the majority of the votes, sending the Blue Team to the Pressure Test.; Team Challenge Winners/Immune: Adam Wong, Brien O'Brien, Cate Meade, Eboni Henry, Heather Dombrosky, Jason Wang, Necco Ceresani, Mike Newton, Sam Reiff-Parasew, Yachecia Holston; Pressure Test: The judges exempt Jeff, Daniel, and Reba from the Pressure Test. The other six Blue Team members must recreate Aarón Sánchez's grilled pork chop dish in 45 minutes. Dino has the best dish. Gabriel, Caitlin, and Jenny also advance.; Immune: Jeff Philbin, Daniel Pontes-Macedo, Reba Billingsley; Bottom two: Jennifer Williams and Paige Jimenez; Eliminated: Paige Jimenez
| 141 | 5 | "Shell-Shocked & Scrambled" | June 28, 2017 | 3.55 |
Mystery Box Challenge: The contestants must cook a dish featuring various types of shellfish. Jeff, Necco, and Jason are called out as the top three. Jason is the winner and earns immunity.; Challenge Winner/Immune: Jason Wang; Elimination Challenge: The remaining contestants must prepare a scrambled egg dish by Gordon and must prepare it using Gordon's cooking style. Jeff, Sam, Heather, Yachecia, Dino, and Caitlin all fail to impress the judges while all other contestants are sent to safety. The six remaining contestants then get one last chance to repeat the dish. The judges send Yachecia and Dino to safety, then Caitlin and Jeff are safe. Sam and Heather are the last two remaining.; Bottom two: Heather Dombrosky and Sam Reiff-Pasarew; Eliminated: Heather Dombrosky
| 142 | 6 | "Silenced by the Lambs" | July 12, 2017 | 3.50 |
Skills Test: The contestants were given a demonstration of how to French a rack of lamb properly in 20 minutes. Cate and Yachecia were the best performers and pronounced safe, while Caitlin, Eboni, Jennifer, Jenny, Newton and Sam all fail to impress the judges. The other contestants are all good enough to be sent to safety.; Challenge Winners/Immune: Cate Meade and Yachecia Holston; Immune: Adam Wong, Brien O'Brien, Daniel Pontes-Macedo, Dino Luciano, Gabriel Lewis, Jason Wang, Jeff Philbin, Necco Ceresani, and Reba Billingsley; Elimination Challenge: Caitlin, Eboni, Jennifer, Jenny, Newton and Sam must cook a dish as demonstrated by Gordon with their previously butchered lamb. The women were all safe, with Caitlin and Eboni being declared to have replicated Gordon's dish the best, while both Sam and Newton were named the bottom two.; Bottom two: Mike Newton and Sam Reiff-Pasarew; Eliminated: Sam Reiff-Pasarew
| 143 | 7 | "Breakfast, Lunch & Winner" | July 19, 2017 | 3.45 |
Team Challenge: Cate and Yachecia were assigned as captains to lead their teams to make five breakfast dishes in 60 minutes for customers at the Belvedere Restaurant of the Peninsula Hotel in Beverly Hills. The judges allowed the remaining contestants to choose their captain as part of the team. Cate's Red Team were voted by the judges as the winners.; Team Challenge Winners/Immune: Adam Wong, Brien O'Brien, Cate Meade, Daniel Pontes-Macedo, Eboni Henry, Gabriel Lewis, Mike Newton and Necco Ceresani; Pressure Test: As the captain, Yachecia was given the choice to save herself or duel another chef in the pressure test, therefore saving everyone else. She chose to duel Jennifer. They will compete in a Pressure Test to recreate Gordon's British fish and chips in 45 minutes.; Immune: Caitlin Jones, Dino Luciano, Jason Wang, Jeff Philbin, Jenny Cavellier and Reba Billingsley; Bottom two: Jennifer Williams and Yachecia Holston; Eliminated: Jennifer Williams
| 144 | 8 | "Whole-y Cow!" | July 26, 2017 | 3.47 |
Mystery Box Challenge: The contestants must create a dish involving an ingredient that comes from a cow within 60 minutes. Newton, Jeff, and Brien are called out as the top three; with Newton winning the challenge, earning immunity and the advantage.; Challenge Winner/Immune: Mike Newton; Elimination Challenge: For winning the mystery box challenge, Newton was able to separate the contestants into two groups of seven — one weak group and one strong group. After this, Newton was given the choice to send one group into the elimination challenge. He chose the strong team, which meant the weak team was immune from the elimination challenge. Cate and Yachecia cook the best dishes and are safe. Gabriel, Jason, and Necco were named the bottom three.; Immune: Adam Wong, Brien O'Brien, Caitlin Jones, Daniel Pontes-Macedo, Dino Luciano, Jenny Cavellier and Reba Billingsley; Challenge Winners Cate Meade and Yachecia Holston; Bottom three: Gabriel Lewis, Jason Wang, and Necco Ceresani; Eliminated: Necco Ceresani
| 145 | 9 | "Holy Cannoli" | August 2, 2017 | 3.75 |
Team Challenge: The judges select Adam and Caitlin as team captains to lead their teams in creating a meal for food providers based on the ingredients they sent to the MasterChef kitchen. Caitlin picked Daniel, Cate, Jenny, Gabriel, Reba and Jason for her Blue Team while Adam picked Brien, Eboni, Newton, Yachecia, Dino and Jeff for his Red Team. The Blue Team won by a score of 19-11.; Team Challenge Winners/Immune: Caitlin Jones, Cate Meade, Daniel Pontes-Macedo, Gabriel Lewis, Jason Wang, Jenny Cavellier and Reba Billingsley; Pressure Test: The judges exempt Yachecia from this pressure test. The remaining chefs competed in a pressure test to make six cannoli with two different flavors. Dino and Eboni made the best cannoli of the six. Newton's were also deemed good enough to make it to safety.; Immune: Yachecia Holston; Bottom three: Adam Wong, Brien O'Brien and Jeff Philbin; Eliminated: Brien O'Brien
| 146 | 10 | "The MasterChef Returns" | August 9, 2017 | 3.32 |
Mystery Box Challenge: Season 7 champion Shaun O'Neale provides the mystery box of ingredients he has chosen, and he cooks alongside the contestants. Caitlin, Yachecia and Cate have the three best dishes, and Cate wins the challenge.; Challenge Winner/Immune: Cate Meade; Elimination Challenge: The judges announce the theme of this challenge will be coconut, and Cate gets to choose for each contestant if they must cook a sweet or a savory dish. She assigns a sweet dish to Jeff, Yachecia, Adam, Dino, Jenny, and Jason. She assigns a savory dish to Newton, Caitlin, Daniel, Eboni, Reba, and Gabriel. Daniel and Dino have the two best dishes, while Caitlin, Jeff, Reba and Newton are all called out for the bottom.; Challenge Winners: Daniel Pontes-Macedo and Dino Angelo Luciano; Bottom four: Caitlin Jones, Jeff Philbin, Reba Billingsley, Mike "Newton" Newton; Eliminated: Reba Billingsley
| 147 | 11 | "Vegas Deluxe & Oyster Shucks" | August 16, 2017 | 3.11 |
Team Challenge: The contestants are flown to Caesars Palace in Las Vegas where they will be split into two teams to feed 50 VIP guests. Daniel and Dino are made the team captains since they won the last challenge, and Dino is given the choice of either selecting his team or selecting the protein and he elects to choose his team. Daniel chooses sea bass leaving Dino with rib cap. Dino's Red Team is Jason, Eboni, Adam, Jenny and Cate, while Daniel's Blue Team is Caitlin, Yachecia, Jeff, Gabriel and Newton. Each diner will taste both plates and choose a favorite dish, and the winning team will be safe. The Red Team wins with 68% of the total vote.; Challenge Winners/Immune: Adam Wong, Cate Meade, Dino Angelo Luciano, Eboni Henry, Jason Wang and Jenny Cavellier.; Pressure Test: The judges announce that the pressure test will be held then and there and that only two members will compete. Daniel gets to choose the two and he chooses Yachecia and Newton. They must replicate a dish of champagne poached oysters in 45 minutes. No winner is announced as the episode ends on a cliffhanger.; Immune: Caitlin Jones, Daniel Pontes-Macedo, Gabriel Lewis and Jeff Philbin; Bottom two: Mike Newton and Yachecia Holston; Eliminated: None yet, will be announced next episode
| 148 | 12 | "In a Pinch" | August 23, 2017 | 3.47 |
Yachecia returns from the last episode, meaning that Newton was eliminated.; Eliminated: Mike Newton; Skills Test: The contestants have 20 minutes to clean the most crawfish perfectly. The five who do the best will be safe from the next challenge. Yachecia, Jason, Daniel, Cate, and Dino are the top five.; Challenge Winners/Immune: Cate Meade, Daniel Pontes-Macedo, Dino Angelo Luciano, Jason Wang and Yachecia Holston.; Pressure Test: The remaining contestants must use the crawfish meat to replicate a crawfish dumpling dish as demonstrated by Gordon in 20 minutes. Eboni, Jeff, Caitlin and Gabriel are saved, leaving Adam and Jenny in the bottom.; Bottom two: Adam Wong and Jenny Cavellier; Eliminated: Jenny Cavellier
| 149 | 13 | "Gordon's Game of Chicken" | August 23, 2017 | 3.47 |
Team Challenge: The judges allow the contestants to pair up with a partner of their choice. The teams are Eboni and Cate, Dino and Jeff, Jason and Daniel, Adam and Caitlin, and Gabriel and Yachecia. They must make a dish featuring chicken and potatoes in 60 minutes. The winning dish will be featured in Family Circle magazine and the team will be safe as well as win a five-year subscription to the magazine. Also, Aarón and Christina will team up and cook alongside the contestants but with 30 minutes to cook. Eboni and Cate are the winning team, while the teams of Dino and Jeff and Jason and Daniel are also safe. Gabriel and Yachecia are the last team saved.; Challenge Winners/Immune: Cate Meade and Eboni Henry; Immune: Daniel Pontes-Macedo, Dino Angelo Luciano, Gabriel Lewis, Jason Wang, Jeff Philbin and Yachecia Holston; Bottom two: Adam Wong and Caitlin Jones; Pressure Test: Adam and Caitlin must replicate Gordon's dish of chicken and potatoes in 45 minutes and they are allowed to taste it and ask a few questions first.; Eliminated: Adam Wong
| 150 | 14 | "A Mexican Tag Team Challenge" | August 30, 2017 | 3.65 |
Mystery Box Challenge: The contestants must make a breakfast dish featuring Nutella in one hour. Gabriel, Jason, and Cate are called out as the top three, and Jason wins the challenge.; Challenge Winner/Immune: Jason Wang; Team Challenge: Jason gets to pair up the remaining contestants for the next challenge. He teams Cate with Dino, Yachecia with Eboni, Jeff with Caitlin, and Daniel with Gabriel. The teams must replicate a platter of Mexican food in one hour but must switch out cooks every ten minutes as this is a tag-team challenge. Cate and Dino are the winners, while the teams of Daniel and Gabriel and Yachecia and Eboni are also safe.; Challenge Winners: Cate Meade and Dino Angelo Luciano; Bottom two: Caitlin Jones and Jeff Philbin; Eliminated: Caitlin Jones
| 151 | 15 | "The Great Outdoors" | August 30, 2017 | 3.65 |
Team Challenge: The contestants travel to Big Bear Lake where they are split into teams. Cate captains the Red Team with Jason, Eboni, and Gabriel, while Dino captains the Blue Team with Daniel, Yachecia, and Jeff. Both teams must cook two separate rainbow trout dishes in a campground kitchen for the judges in one hour. Once they are finished, Gordon announces that the judges will only taste one of the dishes and that the teams must choose their best dish. The Red Team wins the challenge.; Challenge Winners/Immune: Cate Meade, Eboni Henry, Gabriel Lewis and Jason Wang; Pressure Test: Back in the MasterChef kitchen, the Blue Team must now recreate a box of nine chocolate truffles with three different flavors in one hour.; Bottom three: Daniel Pontes-Macedo, Jeff Philbin and Yachecia Holston; Eliminated: Daniel Pontes-Macedo
| 152 | 16 | "Chopsticks & Pasta" | September 6, 2017 | 3.80 |
Mystery Box Challenge: The mystery box contains chopsticks, as the contestants must make an Asian-inspired dish in 60 minutes. The top three dishes belong to Dino, Jason and Jeff, and Dino is the winner.; Challenge Winner/Immune: Dino Angelo Luciano; Pressure Test: The remaining contestants must make a homemade pasta dish, and Dino gets to choose which contestant cooks which style of pasta. He assigns pappardelle to Jason, farfalle to Eboni, cannelloni to Gabriel, cavatelli to Cate, tortellini to Yachecia, and egg yolk ravioli to Jeff. Eboni wins the challenge while Jason is also a top dish. Yachecia and Gabriel are called out as the bottom two.; Challenge Winner: Eboni Henry; Bottom two: Gabriel Lewis and Yachecia Holston; Eliminated: Gabriel Lewis
| 153 | 17 | "Pop-Up Restaurant" | September 6, 2017 | 3.80 |
Team Challenge: The contestants are taken to Triunfo Creek Vineyard where they are split into two teams. Eboni and Jason are the team captains for having the best dishes in the last challenge. Eboni's Blue Team includes Cate and Jeff; while Jason's Red Team includes Dino and Yachecia. They will cook two appetizers and two entrées in a pop-up restaurant and the judges will determine the winning team based on guest feedback. The Red Team wins the challenge.; Challenge Winners/Immune: Dino Angelo Luciano, Jason Wang and Yachecia Holston; Pressure Test: Back at the MasterChef kitchen, the Blue Team members must make a chocolate soufflé in 35 minutes.; Bottom three: Cate Meade, Eboni Henry and Jeff Philbin; Eliminated: None
| 154 | 18 | "Something Fishy" | September 13, 2017 | 4.10 |
Mystery Box Challenge: The six finalists faced a Mystery Box Challenge to cook a dish inspired by their family members. Eboni, Cate, and Yachecia delivered the top dishes with Cate winning.; Challenge Winner/Immune: Cate Meade; Elimination Challenge: As the winner of the Mystery Box Challenge, Cate assigned different time limits to the other contestants to cook dishes with salmon to join her in the semifinals: Jason got 60 minutes, Eboni had 50 minutes, Yachecia had 40 minutes, Dino had 30 minutes and Jeff had 20 minutes. Yachecia and Jeff were called out as the bottom.; Bottom two: Yachecia Holston and Jeff Philbin; Eliminated: Yachecia Holston and Jeff Philbin
| 155 | 19 | "The Semi-Finals" | September 13, 2017 | 4.10 |
Semi-Finals Skills Test 1: The contestants compete in a three-round Skills Test from each of the judges. The winner of each challenge will advance to the Finale. For the first round, Christina gave them a task to bake profiteroles in 45 minutes. Jason was the first contestant to advance in the Finals.; Winner: Jason Wang; Semi-Finals Skills Test 2: Aarón challenged the remaining contestants in the 25-minute second round to bake a Latin-inspired molten lava cake and it was Eboni who won.; Winner: Eboni Henry; Bottom two: Dino Angelo Luciano and Cate Meade; Semi-Finals Skills Test 3: The last round tasked Dino and Cate to bake a cheese soufflé by Gordon to secure the last place in the Finals. Dino won the round over Cate.; Winner: Dino Angelo Luciano; Eliminated: Cate Meade
| 156 | 20 | "The Finale, Pt. 1" | September 20, 2017 | 3.95 |
The judges are joined by former MasterChef judge Joe Bastianich for the judging of the finals. The three finalists will have one hour for each course to prepare four portions of their best appetizer, entrée, and dessert.; Appetizer: Jason serves a uni custard with prawns, clams, and a miso vinaigrette. Eboni serves pan-seared scallops with charred romanesco, rainbow chard, and a pea purée. Dino serves squid ink capellini with calamari, clams, and cherry tomatoes.; The entrées begin cooking as the first hour ends.
| 157 | 21 | "The Finale, Pt. 2" | September 20, 2017 | 3.95 |
Entrée: Jason serves a tofu-skin wrapped black cod with bay scallops, maitake mushrooms, and a cucumber-pea tendril sauce. Dino serves rack of lamb on a lamb belly and sunchoke caponata with a balsamic glaze. Eboni serves a honey-glazed duck breast with sweet potato mash, collard greens and crispy heirloom carrots.; Dessert: Dino serves a roasted pistachio tiramisu with orange mascarpone cream, espresso caviar, and a pistachio tuile. Eboni serves a chocolate orbit cake with a macadamia crumble and a passion fruit coulis. Jason serves a black sesame japonaise with chocolate-yuzu mousse and berry-shiso coulis.; Final Three: Dino Angelo Luciano, Eboni Henry and Jason Wang; Winner Revealed: After reviewing all of the meals from the contestants, the judges name Dino the winner of this year's MasterChef, winning him the $250,000, the trophy, and the cookbook deal.; MasterChef Winner: Dino Angelo Luciano
