= MasterChef (American TV series) season 7 =

Season of television series

MasterChef
- Season 7
- Promotional poster for season 7, featuring (L to R) judges Christina Tosi and Gordon Ramsay
- Judges: Gordon Ramsay; Christina Tosi; Rotating guest judges
- No. of contestants: 20
- Winner: Shaun O'Neale
- Runners-up: Brandi Mudd; David Williams
- No. of episodes: 19

Release
- Original network: Fox
- Original release: June 1 – September 14, 2016

Season chronology
- ← Previous; Season 6 Next → Season 8

The seventh season of the American competitive reality television series MasterChef premiered on Fox on June 1, 2016 and concluded on September 14, 2016.

Gordon Ramsay and Christina Tosi returned as judges. Graham Elliot left the show after six seasons. In this season, the third judge was a series of guest judges.

The season was won by Shaun O'Neale with Brandi Mudd and David Williams finishing as co-runners-up. This season marked the first time that three home cooks competed in the finale.

== Top 20 ==
Source for names, hometowns, and ages. Occupations and nicknames as given on air or stated in cites.

Contestant	Age	Hometown	Occupation	Status
Shaun O'Neale	33	Las Vegas, Nevada	DJ	Winner September 14
Brandi Mudd	27	Irvington, Kentucky	Elementary School Teacher	Runners-up September 14
David Williams	35	Las Vegas, Nevada	Professional Poker Player	Runners-up September 14
Tanorria Askew	34	Chattanooga, Tennessee	Credit Union Coordinator	Eliminated September 7
Daniel "Dan" Paustian	26	Charlotte, North Carolina	Server	Eliminated September 7
Katie Dixon	33	Hattiesburg, Mississippi	Fitness Trainer/Retail Associate	Eliminated August 31
Nathan Barnhouse	20	Slippery Rock, Pennsylvania	Tuxedo Salesman	Eliminated August 31
Eric Howard	26	Queens, New York	Fireman	Eliminated August 24
Terrance "Terry" Mueller	40	Long Island, New York	Handyman	Eliminated August 24
Diamond Alexander	24	San Diego, California	Web Designer	Eliminated August 3
Andrea Galan	21	Miami, Florida	Student	Eliminated August 3
Alejandro Toro	26	Miami, Florida	Voice Over Artist	Eliminated July 27
D'Andre Balaoing	25	Las Vegas, Nevada	Bartender	Eliminated July 20
Diana Bilow	23	Plainfield, Illinois	Server	Eliminated July 20
Manny Washington	29	Orlando, Florida	Fireman	Eliminated July 13
Lisa-Ann Marchesi	46	Gillette, New Jersey	Insurance Manager	Eliminated July 6
Brittany Craig	22	New Hartford, New York	Server	Eliminated June 29
Barbara Savage	51	Denver, Colorado	Investigator	Eliminated June 22
Bill Travers	62	Pauma Valley, California	Retired	Eliminated June 15
Cassie Peterson	25	Clear Lake, Iowa	Bakery Clerk	Eliminated June 15

== Elimination table ==
Place	Contestant	Episode																								
Place	Contestant	3		4	5		6		7	8		9	10	11		12		13		14		15	16		17	18/19
1	Shaun	IN	IN	IN	IN	IN	IN	IMM	WIN	WIN	IMM	PT	PT	IN	WIN	WIN	IMM	IN	IMM	IN	LOW	PT	WIN	IMM	WIN	WINNER
2	Brandi	IN	IMM	WIN	IN	LOW	IN	IMM	WIN	HIGH	IMM	WIN	WIN	IN	IN	HIGH	WIN	IN	IMM	WIN	IMM	WIN	IN	WIN	WIN	RUNNERS-UP
2	David	IN	IN	WIN	IN	IMM	IN	IMM	PT	IN	IN	WIN	WIN	IN	LOW	HIGH	WIN	IN	IMM	HIGH	WIN	WIN	IN	LOW	PT	RUNNERS-UP
4	Tanorria	IN	IMM	WIN	WIN	IMM	IN	IMM	PT	IN	IN	LOW	WIN	HIGH	IN	IN	LOW	LOW	IN	HIGH	IN	WIN	HIGH	HIGH	ELIM	
5	Dan	IN	IN	LOW	IN	IN	IN	IMM	WIN	IN	IN	PT	WIN	HIGH	IN	IN	IN	LOW	IN	IN	IN	LOW	HIGH	ELIM		
6	Katie	IN	IMM	IN	IN	IN	IN	IMM	LOW	IN	WIN	WIN	WIN	IN	LOW	IN	IN	LOW	LOW	IN	WIN	ELIM				
7	Nathan	LOW	WIN	IN	IN	IN	LOW	IN	WIN	IN	IN	WIN	NPT	IN	IN	IN	IN	IN	IMM	IN	ELIM					
8	Eric	IN	IN	WIN	IN	LOW	LOW	IN	NPT	HIGH	WIN	LOW	PT	IN	IN	IN	IMM	LOW	ELIM							
9	Terry	IN	WIN	WIN	IN	WIN	IN	IMM	PT	IN	IN	PT	PT	WIN	IMM	IN	ELIM									
10	Diamond	IN	IMM	WIN	IN	IMM	IN	IMM	WIN	IN	IN	WIN	PT	IN	ELIM											
11	Andrea	WIN	IMM	LOW	HIGH	IN	LOW	IN	WIN	IN	IN	WIN	ELIM													
12	Alejandro	IN	IN	IN	HIGH	IN	WIN	IMM	WIN	IN	LOW	ELIM														
13	D'Andre	IN	LOW	LOW	IN	IN	IN	IMM	WIN	IN	ELIM															
13	Diana	IN	IMM	WIN	IN	IMM	LOW	LOW	LOW	IN	ELIM															
15	Manny	IN	IN	WIN	IN	IN	IN	IMM	ELIM																	
16	Lisa-Ann	IN	IMM	WIN	IN	IN	LOW	ELIM																		
17	Brittany	IN	IMM	LOW	IN	ELIM																				
18	Barbara	IN	IMM	ELIM																						
19	Bill	LOW	ELIM																							
20	Cassie	ELIM																								

(WINNER) This cook won the competition.
(RUNNER-UP) This cook finished as a runner-up in the finals.
(WIN) The cook won the individual challenge (Mystery Box Challenge, Skills Test, Pressure Test, or Elimination Test).
(WIN) The cook was on the winning team in the Team Challenge and directly advanced to the next round.
(HIGH) The cook was one of the top entries in the individual challenge but didn't win.
(IN) The cook wasn't selected as a top or bottom entry in an individual challenge.
(IN) The cook wasn't selected as a top or bottom entry in a team challenge.
(IMM) The cook didn't have to compete in that round of the competition and was safe from elimination.
(IMM) The cook was selected by Mystery Box Challenge winner and didn't have to compete in the Elimination Test.
(PT) The cook was on the losing team in the Team Challenge, competed in the Pressure Test, and advanced.
(NPT) The cook was on the losing team in the Team Challenge, did not compete in the Pressure Test, and advanced.
(LOW) The cook was one of the bottom entries in an individual challenge or Pressure Test, but advanced.
(LOW) The cook was one of the bottom entries in the Team Challenge, but advanced.
(ELIM) The cook was eliminated from MasterChef.

=== Guest judges ===
- Wolfgang Puck - Episode 3; Episodes 18-19
- Aarón Sanchez - Episodes 5-7
- Edward Lee - Episodes 8-11
- Kevin Sbraga - Episodes 12-15
- Richard Blais - Episode 16-17
- Daniel Boulud - Episodes 18-19

=== Main guest appearances ===
- Nick Nappi - Episode 4
- Claudia Sandoval - Episode 5

== Episodes ==
No. overall	No. in season	Title	Original release date	U.S. viewers (millions)
118	1	"Battle for a White Apron, Part 1"	June 1, 2016	3.81
Auditions Round 1: 40 contestants participate in head-to-head battles in front of Gordon Ramsay and Christina Tosi, with home cooks with similar signature dishes competing against each other for a white apron and a spot in the top 20. The first battle is between Brandi and Samson in steaks. Brandi's dish is deemed to be better, winning her the first MasterChef white apron. The second battle is between Andrea and Taylor in cupcakes, where Andrea is declared as the winner. The next battle is between four firemen in their signature fire house dishes; Eric and Manny both receive white aprons. In the following battles, Terry, Bill, Barbara, Nathan and Lisa-Ann all are advanced into the next stage of the competition. The last battle in this episode is between Joe and David in pork chops. David is declared as the winner.
119	2	"Battle for a White Apron, Part 2"	June 8, 2016	4.08
Auditions Round 2: The remaining contestants continue participating in head-to-head battles in front of Gordon and Christina to earn a spot in the top 20. The first battle is between Dan and Takeila in tacos, where Dan emerges as the winner. The second battle is between Alejandro and Zack in burgers. The judges invite both home cooks' mothers in, and Alejandro is declared as the winner. The following battle is between Brittany, Shawn, Neco and Tanorria in the classic shrimp and grits. The white aprons go to Tanorria and Brittany. In following battles, Katie, Diana, Cassie, Diamond and D'Andre all come out victorious and earn their spots in the top 20. The last head-to-head features a surf and turf battle between Shaun and James, who are both from Las Vegas. Shaun's dish wins him the final white apron of the season. The twenty contestants who failed to get an apron are eliminated immediately without a second chance, unlike the auditions in season six.
120	3	"Wolfgang Puck"	June 15, 2016	4.26
Mystery Box Challenge: The contestants face a potato-themed mystery box challenge for their guest judge, Wolfgang Puck, with the winner being safe from elimination and gaining an advantage in the elimination challenge. With ten minutes left on the clock, the judges announce that the home cook with the worst dish will be sent home immediately. The worst three dishes belong to Nathan, Cassie and Bill.; Bottom three: Bill Travers, Cassie Peterson and Nathan Barnhouse; Cassie is deemed to have the worst dish and is eliminated. Andrea is then declared to be the winner of the Mystery Box.; Eliminated: Cassie Peterson; Challenge Winner/Immune: Andrea Galan; Elimination Test: The challenge is to recreate one of Gordon's signature dishes. Andrea is safe from elimination and is allowed to save either all the men or the women from this challenge; she chooses to save the remaining women. After Gordon makes the dish, the men have to recreate it on taste alone. Nathan and Terry had the best dishes, making them team captains for the upcoming first team challenge. The bottom two were Bill and D'Andre.; Immune: Barbara Savage, Brandi Mudd, Brittany Craig, Diamond Alexander, Diana Bilow, Katie Dixon, Lisa-Ann Marchesi and Tanorria Askew; Winners: Nathan Barnhouse and Terry Mueller; Bottom two: Bill Travers and D'Andre Balaoing; Eliminated: Bill Travers
121	4	"A MasterChef Wedding"	June 22, 2016	3.81
Team Challenge: The contestants cater for season six contestant Nick Nappi's wedding. They are required to prepare a scallop appetizer and a lamb entree to please the wedding guests including other former contestants from last season. Terry will captain the Red Team and Nathan will captain the Blue Team. The remaining contestants can decide which team they would like to join. Additionally, the judges announce that there will be no pressure test following the challenge and some members of the losing team will be automatically put up for elimination. Andrea, Barbara, Brittany, Dan and Katie join Nathan. Terry ejects D'Andre, Alejandro, and Shaun to Nathan's team to even the numbers, leaving him with Brandi, David, Diamond, Diana, Eric, Lisa-Ann, Manny and Tanorria. Terry's Red Team comes out victorious.; Team Challenge Winners/Immune: Brandi Mudd, David Williams, Diamond Alexander, Diana Bilow, Eric Howard, Lisa-Ann Marchesi, Manny Washington, Tanorria Askew and Terry Mueller; After the challenge, the judges decide to save Alejandro, Katie, Shaun and Nathan. The remaining five will be put up for elimination back in the MasterChef kitchen.; Immune: Alejandro Toro, Katie Dixon, Nathan Barnhouse and Shaun O'Neale; Bottom five: Andrea Galan, Barbara Savage, Brittany Craig, D'Andre Balaoing and Dan Paustian; Eliminated: Barbara Savage
122	5	"Mexican Mystery"	June 29, 2016	3.97
Mystery Box Challenge: The boxes were filled with ingredients handpicked by season six winner Claudia Sandoval. The home cooks must make dishes using Claudia's Latin ingredient's to impress Gordon, Christina, and guest judge Aarón Sanchez, while also cooking alongside Claudia and Aarón. The top three dishes were Alejandro's, Tanorria's, and Andrea's. Tanorria was declared to be the winner.; Challenge Winner/Immune: Tanorria Askew; Elimination Test: Tanorria was guaranteed safety from elimination. The theme of this elimination challenge featured desserts, and Tanorria was shown the judges' favorite type of desserts. She chose Christina's pies as the task of the elimination challenge. Tanorria was also informed that she would also be able to save three home cooks from elimination at the end of cooking. She decided to save Diana, Diamond and David from elimination. Terry's pie was deemed to be the best of the challenge. The worst three pies of the challenge belonged to Brittany, Eric and Brandi.; Immune: David Williams, Diamond Alexander and Diana Bilow; Winner: Terry Mueller; Bottom three: Brandi Mudd, Brittany Craig and Eric Howard; Eliminated: Brittany Craig
123	6	"Gordon Ramsay Masterclass"	July 6, 2016	4.06
Skills Test: The contestants had 20 minutes to humanely kill, poach, and de-shell a live lobster after a quick lesson on how to do so from Gordon. The best lobster of the night belonged to Alejandro, giving him an advantage in the upcoming team challenge. Andrea, Diana, Eric, Lisa-Ann, and Nathan did not pass the challenge and were sent to the elimination test.; Challenge Winner/Immune: Alejandro Toro; Immune: Brandi Mudd, D'Andre Balaoing, Dan Paustian, David Williams, Diamond Alexander, Katie Dixon, Manny Washington, Shaun O'Neale, Tanorria Askew and Terry Mueller; Elimination Test: Andrea, Diana, Eric, Lisa-Ann and Nathan had to recreate Gordon's lobster tortellini served in a seafood broth, after receiving a demonstration from Gordon. Andrea, Eric and Nathan were all sent to safety, leaving Diana and Lisa-Ann as the bottom two.; Bottom two: Diana Bilow and Lisa-Ann Marchesi; Eliminated: Lisa-Ann Marchesi
124	7	"Jets, Vets, and Home Cooks"	July 13, 2016	3.65
Team Challenge: The contestants had to cook a meal for 101 U.S. military veterans, with the veterans choosing the winning team. Alejandro was automatically a team captain, and the remaining 14 home cooks split themselves into two teams of seven each with Alejandro picking his team to lead. He chooses the team of Andrea, Brandi, D'Andre, Dan, Diamond, Nathan and Shaun to form the Blue Team, leaving David, Diana, Eric, Katie, Manny, Tanorria and Terry for the Red Team, who then elect David as their captain. Both teams must cook a hanger steak with a sauce and two sides. The Blue Team won 77 votes to 24.; Team Challenge Winners/Immune: Alejandro Toro, Andrea Galan, Brandi Mudd, D'Andre Balaoing, Dan Paustian, Diamond Alexander, Nathan Barnhouse and Shaun O'Neale; Pressure Test: The Red Team were tasked with determining one person on their team that would not have to compete in the Pressure Test. They chose Eric. Gordon then presented them with a chicken and explained how to carve it. He then presented them with a further challenge, to make a delicious fried chicken. David, Tanorria and Terry have the best fried chicken and are sent to safety.; Immune: Eric Howard; Bottom three: Diana Bilow, Katie Dixon and Manny Washington; Eliminated: Manny Washington
125	8	"The Good, The Bad, and The Offal"	July 20, 2016	3.87
Mystery Box Challenge: Guest judge Edward Lee informs the cooks they will have to prepare four entrées in 45 minutes without spending more than $20 on ingredients. The winner will have their recipe featured in Family Circle magazine and receive immunity for the upcoming elimination challenge. The top three dishes are Shaun's, Brandi's, and Eric's. Shaun is declared the winner.; Challenge Winner/Immune: Shaun O'Neale; Elimination Test: The remaining contestants must cook dishes using various forms of offal, and Shaun gets to choose who gets which cut and also gets to give one chef immunity. He saves Brandi. Eric and Katie make the two best dishes and become team captains for the next team challenge. The worst dishes belong to Alejandro, Diana and D'Andre.; Immune: Brandi Mudd; Winners: Eric Howard and Katie Dixon; Bottom three: Alejandro Toro, D'Andre Balaoing and Diana Bilow; Eliminated: Diana Bilow and D’Andre Balaoing
126	9	"A Piece of Cake"	July 27, 2016	3.41
Team Challenge: The contestants are divided into teams and tasked to cook a meal for teenagers celebrating their sweet sixteen birthday party, with the winning team being safe from the upcoming Pressure Test. The birthday guests will choose the winning dish. Eric and Katie are the team captains, and Eric gets first pick. Eric chooses Shaun, Tanorria, Terry, Alejandro, and Dan for the Red Team, while Katie has Brandi, Andrea, David, Diamond, and Nathan on the Blue Team. The Blue Team takes 80% of the votes and wins the challenge.; Team Challenge Winners/Immune: Andrea Galan, Brandi Mudd, David Williams, Diamond Alexander, Katie Dixon and Nathan Barnhouse; Pressure Test: The Red Team members must bake and decorate a three-layer birthday cake. Shaun has the best cake. Terry and Dan also advance.; Challenge Winner: Shaun O'Neale; Bottom three: Alejandro Toro, Eric Howard and Tanorria Askew; Eliminated: Alejandro Toro
127	10	"The Weakest Links"	August 3, 2016	3.78
Team Challenge: The remaining contestants are taken to a vegetable patch for their next team challenge, where they will cook for 101 farmers. Diamond and Dan were chosen as team captains. The judges flipped a coin to decide either which cut of pork they will have, or they will get first pick. Dan won the toss and he chose the cut of pork which was the pork chop, meaning Diamond got the pork tenderloin and first pick. Diamond chose Shaun, Eric, Terry, Andrea, and was left with Nathan for the Red Team, while Dan chose Brandi, Tanorria, Katie, and David for the Blue Team. The teams have 75 minutes to make their dish which includes vegetables they pick straight from the ground, and the farmers will vote for the winning dish after tasting both. The Blue Team won with 81 votes.; Team Challenge Winners/Immune: Brandi Mudd, Dan Paustian, David Williams, Katie Dixon and Tanorria Askew; Pressure Test: The Blue Team gets to save one member of the Red Team and they save Nathan. The remaining contestants must make sausages from scratch and present them to the judges' table within 60 minutes. Andrea has a sausage that is praised by the judges, but she presents her dish three seconds too late, and is therefore eliminated.; Immune: Nathan Barnhouse; Eliminated: Andrea Galan
128	11	"Sweet Surprise"	August 3, 2016	3.78
Mystery Box Challenge: The remaining home cooks have an hour to make a breakfast dish with Nutella spread, with Christina cooking along with them. The winner will choose the dish made in the Elimination Challenge. The top three dishes belong to Dan, Tannoria, and Terry. Terry's dish wins this challenge.; Challenge Winner/Immune: Terry Mueller; Elimination Test: Terry is given a choice of three rice-based dishes for the other contestants to cook. He chooses a Korean bibimbap, and the contestants have 45 minutes to make their best version. Shaun had the best dish. The bottom three are Diamond, David, and Katie.; Winner: Shaun O'Neale; Bottom three: David Williams, Diamond Alexander and Katie Dixon; Eliminated: Diamond Alexander
129	12	"5 Star Food"	August 24, 2016	4.13
Mystery Box Challenge: The remaining contestants receive a Mystery Box of high-end ingredients, and must make their dish while being joined by this week's guest judge, Kevin Sbraga. The top three dishes are David's, Shaun's, and Brandi's. Shaun wins.; Challenge Winner/Immune: Shaun O’Neale; Elimination Test: Shaun is told by the judges that this elimination test features salmon, and he gets to decide which contestants use fresh salmon and which contestants use canned salmon. Shaun gives the fresh salmon to Eric, Nathan, Katie, and Brandi, leaving canned salmon to Dan, David, Tanorria, and Terry. The contestants have 60 minutes to make their dish. With ten minutes remaining, Shaun is told that he gets to save one contestant. He saves Eric. The best two dishes belong to Brandi and David, and the worst two dishes belong to Terry and Tanorria.; Immune: Eric Howard; Winners: Brandi Mudd and David Williams; Bottom two: Tanorria Askew and Terry Mueller; Eliminated: Terry Mueller
130	13	"Hot Potato"	August 24, 2016	4.13
Skills Test Part 1: The top eight compete in a series of three skills challenges involving potatoes. The top half in each test will be safe until the last challenge when the lowest contestant will be eliminated. The first skills test involves cutting and cooking fresh French fries. Brandi, David, Shaun, and Nathan advance.; Winners: Brandi Mudd, David Williams, Nathan Barnhouse and Shaun O’Neale; Skills Test Part 2: The remaining four contestants must make creamy mashed potatoes from scratch. Tanorria and Dan advance, leaving Eric and Katie to face the elimination test.; Winners: Dan Paustian and Tanorria Askew; Bottom two: Eric Howard and Katie Dixon; Skills Test Part 3: Eric and Katie must make potato gnocchi in brown butter sage sauce.; Eliminated: Eric Howard
131	14	"Tag Team"	August 31, 2016	4.17
Mystery Box Challenge: This Mystery Box contains a cast-iron pan, a wooden spoon, and a paring knife, and the contestants must use only these tools to make their dish in 60 minutes, with Gordon cooking alongside them. The top three dishes belong to Tanorria, Brandi, and David, and Brandi's dish wins the challenge, granting her immunity.; Challenge Winner/Immune: Brandi Mudd; Elimination Test: The remaining contestants must recreate a picnic basket of various foods. This challenge will be a tag team challenge, and Brandi will select the teams. She pairs Shaun with Nathan, David with Katie, and Dan with Tanorria. David and Katie had the best basket, making them team captains in the next challenge. Nathan and Shaun's basket is deemed the worst.; Winners: David Williams and Katie Dixon; Bottom two: Nathan Barnhouse and Shaun O'Neale; Eliminated: Nathan Barnhouse
132	15	"Pop-Up Restaurant"	August 31, 2016	4.17
Team Challenge: The contestants are taken to a pop-up restaurant where they will cook two appetizers and two entrées for the restaurant's guests. David and Katie are team captains, with David choosing Brandi and Tanorria for his Blue Team, and Katie choosing Shaun and Dan for the Red Team. After service is completed, the Blue Team is declared the winners.; Winners/Immune: Brandi Mudd, David Williams and Tanorria Askew; Pressure Test: The Red Team must cook three desserts featuring chocolate in one hour.; Bottom three: Dan Paustian, Katie Dixon and Shaun O'Neale; Eliminated: Katie Dixon
133	16	"Family Drama"	September 7, 2016	4.39
Mystery Box Challenge: Chef Richard Blais serves as the guest judge for this week. The top five contestants are visited by their respective member of the family. Their ingredients were chosen by their families. Dan, Tannoria and Shaun have the top dishes, and Shaun wins this challenge.; Challenge Winner/Immune: Shaun O’Neale; Elimination Test: The remaining contestants get to choose 20 ingredients to make any dish of their choice. But before cooking begins, the judges announce that Shaun gets to switch the baskets. David had Dan's basket, Brandi has David's, Tannoria got Brandi's and Tannoria's basket was given to Dan. Brandi had the best dish, giving her an advantage in the next team challenge. Dan and David are the bottom two.; Winner: Brandi Mudd; Bottom two: Dan Paustian and David Williams; Eliminated: Dan Paustian
134	17	"Critics Choice"	September 7, 2016	4.39
Team Challenge: The judges announce that three cooks will advance to the final. The team challenge is to cook an entrée for 17 restaurant critics. For winning the last challenge, Brandi was allowed to choose her teammate. She pairs with Shaun for the Blue Team, leaving David and Tanorria as the Red Team. The critics name the Blue Team winners.; Winners/Immune: Brandi Mudd and Shaun O'Neale; Pressure Test: David and Tanorria must cook three pork dishes for the judges.; Bottom two: David Williams and Tanorria Askew; Eliminated: Tanorria Askew
135	18	"The Finale, Pt. 1"	September 14, 2016	4.36
The three finalists are sent home for one week to plan their menus. They are visited at their homes by Gordon and Christina. For the finals, Wolfgang Puck and Daniel Boulud join the judging panel. The finalists will have one hour for each course to prepare four portions of their best appetizer, entrée, and dessert.; Appetizer: Brandi presents braised pork belly with BBQ sauce and squash-parsnip puree; David prepares beet cured salmon with a soft-boiled egg, filo dough noodles, salmon roe and caviar; and Shaun makes halibut cheeks with vadouvan carrot puree, pickled mushrooms, and uni foam.; The entrées begin cooking as the first hour ends.
136	19	"The Finale, Pt. 2"	September 14, 2016	4.36
Entrée: Shaun makes a spice-rubbed venison with cipollini onions, smoked plums, black truffle, and fiddlehead ferns; Brandi makes a seared duck breast with andoulle-greens, blackberry demi-glace, and ramp hush puppies; while David serves cabbage-wrapped guinea hen with foie gras, morel mushrooms, and a yellow wine cream sauce.; Dessert: Brandi makes a cornmeal madeleine with bourbon caramel sauce, white chocolate mousse, and glazed peaches; David serves stuffed cherries with white chocolate glaze, cherry compote, and cookie crumble; and Shaun has a salted caramel tart with dark chocolate ganache and raspberry coulis.; Final Three: Brandi Mudd, David Williams and Shaun O'Neale; Winner Revealed: After reviewing all of the meals from the contestants, the judges name Shaun the winner of this year's MasterChef, winning him the $250,000, the trophy, and the cookbook deal.; MasterChef Winner: Shaun O'Neale
