= MasterChef Vietnam season 3 =

MasterChef Vietnam
- Season 3
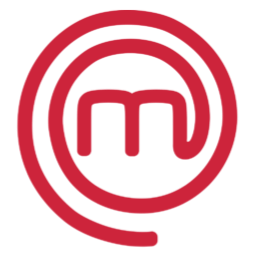
- No. of episodes: 15

Release
- Original network: VTV
- Original release: 5 September – 12 December 2015

MasterChef Vietnam 2015 is the third season of the reality TV show MasterChef Vietnam. The original MasterChef program was developed by BHD Company in United Kingdom with Vietnam Television buying copyright and implementation. Unlike most series around the world, local celebrities will compete for prize money along with amateur cooks. Christine Ha, the first blind and Asian winner for season 3 of US version of Master Chef became the third judge, having been a guest judge in the previous two series and in MasterChef US season 4 and MasterChef US season 6. She is the first former contestant and winner worldwide to become a judge.

== Top 13 ==
Contestant	Age	Hometown	Occupation	Status	Winnings
Nguyễn Thanh Cường	31	Ho Chi Minh City	Businessman	Winner 12 December	7
Phạm Thị Tuyết	28	Quang Nam	Tour guide	Runner-up 12 December	4
Nguyễn Quang Đạt	32	Hai Phong	Postgraduate	Eliminated 5 December	5
Trần Quốc Việt	33	Hanoi	Businessman	Eliminated 28 November	5
Vũ Thị Bích Hạnh	33	Tien Giang	Administrative staff personnel	Eliminated 21 November	6
Dương Quốc Cường	28	England	Freelance business	Eliminated 14 November	3
Phan Anh	20	Hanoi	Student	Eliminated 14 November	1
Trần Ngọc Anh	21	Hanoi	Student	Eliminated 31 October	0
Trần Đăng Vũ	32	Hanoi	Accountant	Eliminated 24 October	2
Trần Thị Kim Oanh	51	Ninh Thuan	Purchaser	Eliminated 17 October	2
Trần Tú Oanh	19	Hanoi	Student	Eliminated 10 October	0
Nguyễn Thị Hồng Nhung	28	Lang Son	Television editor	Eliminated 3 October	0
Nguyễn Quang Huy	34	Haiphong	Businessman	Eliminated 26 September	0

== Elimination table ==
Place	Contestant	Episode																	
Place	Contestant	4		5	6		7	8		9	10		11	12		13	14		15
1	Cường N.	HIGH	WIN	NPT	HIGH	IN	WIN	WIN	IMM	WIN	HIGH	LOW	WPT	HIGH	HIGH	WIN	IN	IN	WINNER
2	Tuyết	IN	IN	LOW	IN	IN	NPT	HIGH	IMM	PT	IN	WIN	PT	WIN	WIN	LOW	WIN	IMM	RUNNER-UP
3	Đạt	IN	IN	WIN	IN	WIN	WIN	HIGH	IMM	NPT	HIGH	IN	WIN	IN	HIGH	WIN	IN	ELIM	
4	Việt	IN	HIGH	WIN	WIN	HIGH	WIN	LOW	HIGH	PT	WIN	IMM	WIN	IN	LOW	ELIM			
5	Hạnh	IN	IN	WIN	HIGH	IN	WIN	IN	WIN	WIN	IN	WIN	WIN	HIGH	ELIM				
6	Cường D.	WIN	IMM	WIN	IN	HIGH	PT	HIGH	IMM	WIN	IN	IN	ELIM						
7	Anh P.	IN	IMM	PT	IN	LOW	LOW	LOW	HIGH	WIN	IN	IN	ELIM						
8	Anh T.	IN	IMM	LOW	IN	LOW	PT	LOW	LOW	ELIM									
9	Vũ	HIGH	LOW	WIN	LOW	IN	WIN	LOW	ELIM										
10	K. Oanh	IN	WIN	WIN	LOW	IN	ELIM												
11	T. Oanh	IN	IN	LOW	LOW	ELIM													
12	Nhung	IN	LOW	ELIM															
13	Huy	IN	ELIM																

(WINNER) This cook won the competition
(RUNNER-UP) This cook finished in second place.
(WIN) The cook won the individual challenge (Mystery Box Challenge, Elimination Test or Dining Family Challenge).
(WIN) The cook was on the winning team in the Team Challenge and was directly advanced to the next round.
(HIGH) The cook was one of the top entries in the individual challenge, but did not win.
(IN) The cook was not selected as a top entry or bottom entry in an individual challenge.
(IMM) The cook was select by Mystery Box Challenge winner and did not have to compete in the Elimination Test.
(IMM) The cook was selected by Mystery Box Challenge winner and didn't have to compete in the Elimination Test.
(WPT) The cook was on the winning team in the Team Challenge, but still competed in the Pressure Test, and advanced.
(PT) The cook was on the losing team in the Team Challenge, competed in the Pressure Test, and advanced.
(NPT) The cook was on the losing team in the Team Challenge, but was exempted from the Pressure Test.
(LOW) The cook was one of the bottom entries in an individual elimination challenge, but was not the last person to advance.
(LOW) The cook was one of the bottom entries in an individual elimination challenge, and was the last person to advance.
(LOW) The cook was one of the bottom entries in the Team Challenge, but advanced.
(ELIM) The cook was out from MasterChef.
