= MasterChef (American TV series) season 6 =

Season of television series

MasterChef
- Season 6
- Promotional poster for season 6, featuring (L to R) Christina Tosi, Gordon Ramsay, and Graham Elliot.
- Judges: Graham Elliot; Gordon Ramsay; Christina Tosi
- No. of contestants: 22
- Winner: Claudia Sandoval
- Runner-up: Derrick Peltz
- No. of episodes: 20

Release
- Original network: Fox
- Original release: May 20 – September 16, 2015

Season chronology
- ← Previous; Season 5 Next → Season 7

The sixth season of the American competitive reality television series MasterChef premiered on Fox on May 20, 2015 and concluded on September 16, 2015.

Gordon Ramsay and Graham Elliot returned as judges. Joe Bastianich left the show after five seasons and was replaced by Christina Tosi.

The season was won by Claudia Sandoval, with Derrick Peltz becoming the runner-up.

== Top 22 ==
Source for names, hometowns, and occupations. Ages and nicknames as given on air or stated in cites.

| Contestant | Age | Hometown | Occupation | Status |
|---|---|---|---|---|
| Claudia Sandoval | 31 | La Mesa, California | Events Manager | Winner September 16 |
| Derrick Peltz | 28 | Fort Myers, Florida | Drummer | Runner-Up September 16 |
| Stephen Lee | 47 | Palm Springs, California | Urban Gardener | Eliminated September 16 |
| Nick Nappi | 31 | San Diego, California | Dishwasher Sales Rep | Eliminated September 9 |
| Katrina Kozar | 34 | Milwaukee, Wisconsin | Administrative Assistant | Eliminated September 2 |
| Hetal Vasavada | 27 | Bloomfield, New Jersey | Startup Developer | Eliminated August 26 |
| Tommy Walton | 53 | Chicago, Illinois | Fashion Designer | Eliminated August 19 |
| Olivia Crouppen | 25 | Thousand Oaks, California | Fashion Stylist | Eliminated August 12 |
| Shelly Flash | 32 | Brooklyn, New York | Kitchen Assistant | Eliminated August 5 |
| Christopher Lu | 30 | Los Angeles, California | Restaurant Manager | Eliminated July 29 |
| Sara Zacek | 29 | Baileys Harbor, Wisconsin | Mobile Home Park Manager | Eliminated July 15 |
| Kerry Prince | 37 | Greensboro, North Carolina | Human Resources Rep | Eliminated July 8 |
| Amanda Saab | 25 | Seattle, Washington | Social Worker | Eliminated July 1 |
| Charlie Chapman | 25 | New Orleans, Louisiana | HVAC Technician | Eliminated July 1 |
| Jesse Romero | 29 | Baton Rouge, Louisiana | Petroleum Landman | Eliminated June 24 |
| Veronica Cili | 58 | Key West, Florida | Beauty Consultant | Eliminated June 24 |
| Ailsa von Dobeneck | 27 | Norfolk, Virginia | Assistant Railroad Manager | Eliminated June 17 |
| Dan Collado | 29 | Chicago, Illinois | Engineer and Model | Withdrew June 17 |
| Justin Banister | 18 | New Caney, Texas | High School Student | Eliminated June 10 |
| Darah Carattini | 29 | Irvine, California | Amusement Park Guide | Eliminated June 3 |
| Brianna Watson | 24 | Worcester, Massachusetts | Hairstylist | Eliminated May 27 |
| Mateo McConnell | 38 | Atlanta, Georgia | High School Teacher | Eliminated May 27 |

== Elimination table ==
| Place | Contestant | Episode | | | | | | | | | | | | | | | | | | | | | | | | | |
| Place | Contestant | 3 | | 4 | 5 | | 6 | 7 | | 8 | 9 | | 10 | | 11 | 12 | 13 | | 14 | 15 | | 16 | 17 | | 18 | 19 | 20 |
|---|---|---|---|---|---|---|---|---|---|---|---|---|---|---|---|---|---|---|---|---|---|---|---|---|---|---|---|
| 1 | Claudia | IN | IMM | NPT | IN | IN | PT | IN | IN | PT | IN | IMM | HIGH | IN | WIN | WIN | IN | LOW | PT | IN | IN | WIN | WIN | IMM | PT | PT | WINNER |
| 2 | Derrick | IN | IN | NPT | IN | IN | PT | WIN | IMM | WIN | LOW | LOW | IN | IN | WIN | NPT | IN | IN | LOW | HIGH | WIN | PT | HIGH | LOW | WIN | WIN | RUNNER-UP |
| 3 | Stephen | IN | IN | WIN | IN | WIN | WIN | IN | IN | NPT | IN | IMM | IN | IN | PT | WIN | WIN | IMM | WIN | IN | WIN | WIN | HIGH | HIGH | WIN | ELIM | |
| 4 | Nick | IN | IMM | WIN | IN | IN | WIN | HIGH | WIN | PT | LOW | PT | IN | IMM | WIN | PT | IN | IN | WIN | WIN | IMM | WIN | IN | WIN | ELIM | | |
| 5 | Katrina | HIGH | IMM | PT | IN | IN | NPT | HIGH | IN | WIN | LOW | LOW | IN | WIN | WIN | WIN | HIGH | IN | WIN | IN | LOW | PT | IN | ELIM | | | |
| 6 | Hetal | HIGH | IMM | PT | IN | IN | NPT | IN | LOW | WIN | IN | IMM | HIGH | WIN | PT | WIN | IN | WIN | LOW | HIGH | IN | ELIM | | | | | |
| 7 | Tommy | IN | IMM | LOW | IN | IN | WIN | IN | IN | WIN | IN | IMM | WIN | IMM | WIN | LOW | HIGH | WIN | WIN | IN | ELIM | | | | | | |
| 8 | Olivia | IN | LOW | PT | HIGH | IN | WIN | IN | WIN | WIN | LOW | IMM | IN | IN | NPT | PT | IN | IN | ELIM | | | | | | | | |
| 9 | Shelly | IN | IMM | WIN | IN | WIN | NPT | IN | IN | LOW | LOW | IMM | IN | LOW | PT | WIN | IN | ELIM | | | | | | | | | |
| 10 | Christopher | IN | WIN | WIN | IN | IN | LOW | IN | IN | WIN | IN | IMM | IN | IN | PT | ELIM | | | | | | | | | | | |
| 11 | Sara | IN | IN | NPT | IN | IN | WIN | IN | IN | PT | IN | IMM | IN | ELIM | | | | | | | | | | | | | |
| 12 | Kerry | IN | IMM | WIN | IN | IN | WIN | IN | IN | WIN | LOW | ELIM | | | | | | | | | | | | | | | |
| 13 | Amanda | IN | IMM | WIN | HIGH | IN | WIN | IN | IN | ELIM | | | | | | | | | | | | | | | | | |
| 13 | Charlie | IN | IN | WIN | IN | LOW | WIN | IN | IN | ELIM | | | | | | | | | | | | | | | | | |
| 15 | Jesse | IN | IMM | WIN | WIN | IMM | WIN | IN | ELIM | | | | | | | | | | | | | | | | | | |
| 15 | Veronica | IN | IN | WIN | IN | LOW | NPT | IN | ELIM | | | | | | | | | | | | | | | | | | |
| 17 | Ailsa | IN | IMM | NPT | IN | IN | ELIM | | | | | | | | | | | | | | | | | | | | |
| 18 | Dan | WIN | IMM | NPT | IN | IN | WDR | | | | | | | | | | | | | | | | | | | | |
| 19 | Justin | IN | IMM | WIN | IN | ELIM | | | | | | | | | | | | | | | | | | | | | |
| 20 | Darah | IN | IMM | ELIM | | | | | | | | | | | | | | | | | | | | | | | |
| 21 | Brianna | IN | ELIM | | | | | | | | | | | | | | | | | | | | | | | | |
| 21 | Mateo | IN | ELIM | | | | | | | | | | | | | | | | | | | | | | | | |

(WINNER) This cook won the competition.
(RUNNER-UP) This cook finished in second place.
(WIN) The cook won the individual challenge (Mystery Box Challenge or Elimination Test).
(WIN) The cook was on the winning team in the Team Challenge and directly advanced to the next round.
(HIGH) The cook was one of the top entries in the individual challenge but didn't win.
(IN) The cook wasn't selected as a top or bottom entry in an individual challenge.
(IN) The cook wasn't selected as a top or bottom entry in a team challenge.
(IMM) The cook didn't have to compete in that round of the competition and was safe from elimination.
(IMM) The cook was selected by Mystery Box Challenge winner and didn't have to compete in the Elimination Test.
(PT) The cook was on the losing team in the Team Challenge, competed in the Pressure Test, and advanced.
(NPT) The cook was on the losing team in the Team Challenge, did not compete in the Pressure Test, and advanced.
(LOW) The cook was one of the bottom entries in an individual challenge or Pressure Test, and advanced.
(LOW) The cook was one of the bottom entries in the Team Challenge, and advanced.
(WDR) The cook withdrew from the competition.
(ELIM) The cook was eliminated from MasterChef.

=== Guest appearances ===
- Leslie Gilliams - Episode 8
- Daniel McGuffey - Episode 8
- Ahran Cho - Episode 8
- Becky Reams - Episode 8
- Felix Fang - Episode 8
- Christine Ha - Episode 17
- Luca Manfè - Episode 17
- Courtney Lapresi - Episode 17

== Episodes ==
| No. overall | No. in season | Title | Original release date | U.S. viewers (millions) |
|---|---|---|---|---|
| 98 | 1 | "Let the Battle Commence (Top 40)" | May 20, 2015 | 3.39 |
Auditions Round 1: The Top 20 contestants were given a surprise once they arrived at the MasterChef kitchen that they would be facing another 20 contestants in head-to-head battles to decide who would be receiving a white apron. Contestants with similar signature dishes were put together against each other to decide which was the best home cook among them. The first battle was between Claudia and Andrew in shrimp, and Claudia emerged as the winner and received the first MasterChef white apron. The next battle was between Stephen and Tommy in pork tenderloin. Tommy won the battle and received a white apron. The next battle was between four contestants - Amanda, Derrick, Nate and Moniza in lamb. Derrick was the first to receive a white apron, after some consideration from the judges, Amanda was the next to receive a white apron. In the following battles, Ailsa, Dan, Kerry, Mateo, Veronica and Nick all received a white apron. The final battle in this episode was between Katrina and Taylor, hometown rivals, in salmon. Katrina was the winner and received the final white apron of the episode.
| 99 | 2 | "The Battle Continues (Top 40)" | May 20, 2015 | 3.39 |
Auditions Round 2: As the head-to-head battles continued, the next battle was between Hetal and Jill in fruit desserts. Hetal was the winner and received a white apron. In the following battles, Darah, Olivia, Sara, Charlie, Justin, Jesse and Brianna all received a white apron. The final head-to-head battle was between Christopher and Shelly in chicken. Christopher was declared as the winner of the battle and received the final white apron.; Auditions Round 3: The defeated home cooks were called back into the MasterChef kitchen and the judges announced that they would be distributing two more white aprons for a spot in the competition. Six of the defeated home cooks were chosen by the judges for the final challenge. Graham chose Taylor and Stephen, Christina chose Andrew and Demetria, and lastly Gordon chose Jill and Shelly. The challenge consisted of every day ingredients and the contestants were given one hour to create a dish for the last two spots. At the end of the challenge, Stephen and Shelly advanced.
| 100 | 3 | "You're the Apple of My Eye (Top 22)" | May 27, 2015 | 4.72 |
Mystery Box Challenge: The contestants were given ingredients that the contestants had themselves left behind in their own kitchen when they left to travel to the competition. The cooks had 60 minutes to prepare their dishes. The top three dishes were Katrina's, Dan's, and Hetal's. Dan was the winner.; Challenge Winner/Immune: Dan Collado; Elimination Test: The contestants were required to make an apple pie in 90 minutes. Dan was immune from the challenge. He also got to choose as many contestants to receive immunity as he wanted. He chose to save Hetal, Amanda, Claudia, Justin, Shelly, Nick, Jesse, Kerry, Tommy, Ailsa, Katrina and Darah. The judges also announced that two cooks would be sent home at the end of this challenge. Christopher was declared winner of the elimination challenge. Veronica, Derrick, Stephan, Charlie, and Sara also had good enough pies to keep themselves in the competition.; Immune: Ailsa von Dobeneck, Amanda Saab, Claudia Sandoval, Darah Carattini, Hetal Vasavada, Jesse Romero, Justin Bannister, Katrina Kozar, Kerry Prince, Nick Nappi, Shelly Flash and Tommy Walton; Winner: Christopher Lu; Bottom three: Brianna Watson, Mateo McConnell and Olivia Crouppen; Eliminated: Brianna Watson and Mateo McConnell
| 101 | 4 | "Cinnamon Roll-er Coaster (Top 20)" | June 3, 2015 | 4.70 |
Team Challenge: The contestants must serve a hamburger with onion rings and coleslaw, and a fish and chips dish for the thousands of visitors of Knott's Berry Farm. The cooks were split into teams of ten. The Red Team consisted of Amanda, Charlie, Christopher, Jesse, Justin, Kerry, Nick, Shelly, Stephen and Veronica, while the Blue Team consisted of Ailsa, Claudia, Dan, Darah, Derrick, Hetal, Katrina, Olivia, Sara and Tommy. The judges selected Kerry as the Red Team captain and Darah as the Blue Team captain. The Red Team received 59% of the votes while the Blue Team received 41% of the votes sending the Blue Team to the pressure test.; Team Challenge Winners/Immune: Amanda Saab, Charlie Chapman, Christopher Lu, Jesse Romero, Justin Bannister, Kerry Prince, Nick Nappi, Shelly Flash, Stephen Lee and Veronica Cili; Pressure Test: The Blue Team were told that only five of them would have to participate in the pressure test. Darah would be deciding which five cooks including herself will be saved. She decided to save Ailsa, Claudia, Sara, Dan and Hetal; however, Hetal declined the immunity and offered Derrick to be sent to safety in her place. The remaining home cooks will make 12 cinnamon rolls for the three judges in 45 minutes. Hetal was the first to be sent to safety; Katrina and Olivia were also sent to safety, leaving Darah and Tommy as the bottom two.; Immune: Ailsa von Dobeneck, Claudia Sandoval, Dan Collado, Derrick Peltz and Sara Zacek; Bottom two: Tommy Walton and Darah Carattini; Eliminated: Darah Carattini
| 102 | 5 | "Clawing to Victory (Top 19)" | June 10, 2015 | 4.83 |
Mystery Box Challenge: The home cooks will have to make a dish with three types of live crabs in 60 minutes. The top three dishes were Amanda's, Olivia's, and Jesse's. Jesse was declared winner of the Mystery Box Challenge.; Challenge Winner/Immune: Jesse Romero; Elimination Test: The remaining cooks must create dishes in 60 minutes using a surprise ingredient. Jesse was immune from the challenge. He was then allowed to choose if the contestants will be making a sweet dish or a savory dish with the ingredient. Jesse chose Veronica, Tommy, Katrina, Kerry, Olivia, Amanda, Christopher, Claudia and Justin to make a sweet dish, while Derrick, Dan, Shelly, Nick, Ailsa, Hetal, Sara, Charlie and Stephen would be making a savory dish. The mystery ingredient was revealed to be corn. Stephen and Shelly are deemed to have the best dishes and are made team captains in the next episode. Claudia and Tommy's dishes are deemed good enough to move on leaving Charlie, Veronica, and Justin as the bottom three.; Winners: Shelly Flash and Stephen Lee; Bottom three: Charlie Chapman, Justin Bannister and Veronica Cili; Eliminated: Justin Bannister
| 103 | 6 | "What Happens in Vegas Steaks in Vegas (Top 18)" | June 17, 2015 | 4.83 |
Team Challenge: Before the challenge began, the judges announced that Dan had withdrawn from the competition for personal reasons. The home cooks would be serving 101 Las Vegas performers using lobsters or chicken tenders as the main ingredient of their entrée dish. Stephen and Shelly were the team captains for this challenge. Stephen was allowed to either choose the ingredient or pick his team first; he decided that he will be picking his team first, and Shelly opted for chicken for her team. Stephen chose Amanda, Charlie, Jesse, Sara, Olivia, Tommy, Kerry and Nick to form the Red Team, leaving Shelly with Ailsa, Claudia, Christopher, Derrick, Hetal, Katrina and Veronica to form the Blue Team. The Red Team received 52 votes while the Blue Team received 49 votes, sending the Blue Team to the pressure test.; Withdrew: Dan Collado; Team Challenge Winners/Immune: Amanda Saab, Charlie Chapman, Jesse Romero, Kerry Prince, Nick Nappi, Olivia Crouppen, Sara Zacek, Stephen Lee and Tommy Walton; Pressure Test: The Pressure Test would be in two parts involving steaks and would be blind-tasted by Gordon Ramsay himself. Shelly was granted immunity and was allowed to select which three members of the Blue Team would be sent to safety along with her. She chose Hetal, Veronica and Katrina, the remainder must serve Gordon Ramsay a medium rare New York strip steak in 20 minutes. The best two home cooks would be sent to safety, leaving the other two to battle it out in the final pressure test. Derrick was the first to be sent to safety, followed by Claudia.; Immune: Hetal Vasavada, Katrina Kozar, Shelly Flash and Veronica Cili; Bottom two: Ailsa von Dobeneck and Christopher Lu; Pressure Test: Ailsa and Christopher had to serve Gordon a rare filet mignon in 15 minutes.; Eliminated: Ailsa von Dobeneck
| 104 | 7 | "Bring Home the Bacon (Top 16)" | June 24, 2015 | 4.73 |
Mystery Box Challenge: The contestants had half an hour to prepare a breakfast dish and also would be cooking alongside Graham Elliot. The top three dishes were Nick's, Katrina's, and Derrick's. Derrick was declared winner of the Mystery Box challenge.; Challenge Winner/Immune: Derrick Peltz; Elimination Test: The contestants were required to recreate and elevate TV dinners. Derrick was safe from elimination. The judges then showed him their favorite TV dinners to which Derrick had to select one for the other contestants to cook in an hour. He chose the Salisbury steak meal. The judges allowed Derrick to choose which contestant would be unable to cook in the first 15 minutes of the challenge; Derrick chose Christopher. The two best TV dinner dishes of the night belong to Nick and Olivia, making them team captains for the next team challenge. Christopher and Shelly are deemed good enough to move on, leaving Hetal, Veronica, and Jesse as the bottom three.; Winners: Nick Nappi and Olivia Crouppen; Bottom three: Hetal Vasavada, Jesse Romero and Veronica Cili; Eliminated: Jesse Romero and Veronica Cili
| 105 | 8 | "Happy Birthday MasterChef (Top 14)" | July 1, 2015 | 4.40 |
Team Challenge: The remaining home cooks were tasked to help celebrate the 100th episode of MasterChef. Each team would prepare a two-course menu, during which VIP guests would dine on an oyster and caviar appetizer and a duck breast entrée, followed by a birthday cake for MasterChef by judge Christina Tosi. Nick and Olivia were the captains for this team challenge, with Nick getting first pick. Nick chose Amanda, Stephen, Sara, Charlie, Shelly and Claudia, forming the Blue Team, while Olivia chose Derrick, Katrina, Christopher, Hetal, Kerry and Tommy, forming the Red Team. The Red Team were declared to be the winners of the Team Challenge, and sending the Blue Team into the pressure test.; Team Challenge Winners/Immune: Christopher Lu, Derrick Peltz, Hetal Vasavada, Katrina Kozar, Kerry Prince, Olivia Crouppen and Tommy Walton; Pressure Test: The judges announced that one member of the Blue Team would be exempt from the test and the team would be choosing that person. Stephen was chosen to be safe. The contestants had to create a three-layer birthday cake in 90 minutes and the judges also announced that two contestants would be sent home. Claudia was the first to be sent to safety, while Nick and Sara's cakes are deemed good enough to move on leaving Shelly, Charlie, and Amanda as the bottom three.; Immune: Stephen Lee; Bottom three: Amanda Saab, Charlie Chapman and Shelly Flash; Eliminated: Amanda Saab and Charlie Chapman
| 106 | 9 | "Gordon's Greatest Hits (Top 12)" | July 8, 2015 | 4.93 |
Team Challenge: The home cooks had to recreate Gordon Ramsay's signature Beef Wellington dish. The home cooks were split into pairs to taste it first. The pairs of home cooks were Christopher and Hetal, Claudia and Tommy, Derrick and Katrina, Kerry and Nick, Olivia and Shelly, Sara and Stephen. Each would be cooking alongside the other home cook they were paired up with, and were given 60 minutes to recreate the dish. Sara, Stephen, Christopher, Hetal, Claudia and Tommy were all sent to safety. Olivia and Shelly were judged to have just done enough to be also sent to safety, thereby leaving Derrick, Katrina, Kerry and Nick to face the pressure test.; Immune: Christopher Lu, Claudia Sandoval, Hetal Vasavada, Olivia Crouppen, Sara Zacek, Shelly Flash, Stephen Lee and Tommy Walton; Pressure Test: Derrick, Katrina, Kerry and Nick were given 30 minutes to recreate one of Ramsay's most well-known appetizers. Nick's dish was the best leaving Derrick, Katrina, and Kerry as the bottom three.; Bottom three: Derrick Peltz, Katrina Kozar and Kerry Prince; Eliminated: Kerry Prince
| 107 | 10 | "Rice Rice Baby (Top 11)" | July 15, 2015 | 4.86 |
Mystery Box Challenge: Each contestant had to create a rice dish and the best dish would also be featured in the September issue of Family Circle magazine. The top three dishes were Hetal's, Tommy's, and Claudia's. Tommy was the winner of the Mystery Box Challenge.; Challenge Winner/Immune: Tommy Walton; Elimination Test: Tommy received immunity from this challenge. He was shown the judges' favorite culinary combos for which he had to select one pair for the other contestants to create a dish out of. He chose peanut butter and jelly. Tommy was also allowed to choose two home cooks to be safe from elimination, one before cooking started and one after cooking ended. He chose Claudia to be saved first, but she turned it down. After cooking ended, Tommy decided to save Nick from elimination. The two best dishes belonged to Hetal and Katrina, who will be made team captains of the upcoming team challenge. Claudia and Christopher's dishes are also good enough to move on.; Immune: Nick Nappi; Winners: Hetal Vasavada and Katrina Kozar; Bottom two: Sara Zacek and Shelly Flash; Eliminated: Sara Zacek
| 108 | 11 | "Moo-vers and Bakers (Top 10)" | July 22, 2015 | 4.44 |
Team Challenge: The home cooks were split into two teams of five and must prep and serve steak dishes to 101 hungry cowboys, cowgirls and country ranchers. The steak dish would require two sides and one sauce. These guests would cast the votes to decide which team had the best performance and whichever team received 50 votes first would win. Hetal and Katrina were selected as team captains for this challenge. However, this time the two selected the members for the opposing captain's team, with Hetal getting first pick. Hetal chose Claudia, Tommy, Nick and Derrick for Katrina, forming the Blue Team, while Katrina chose Shelly, Olivia, Christopher and Stephen for Hetal, forming the Red Team. Hetal also was allowed to choose which type of steak both teams would be cooking. Hetal opted for the hanger steak, leaving the New York strip for Katrina's team. The Blue Team won sending the Red Team to the pressure test.; Team Challenge Winners/Immune: Claudia Sandoval, Derrick Peltz, Katrina Kozar, Nick Nappi and Tommy Walton; Pressure Test: The judges announced that one person would be safe from elimination, and this decision was left to the Blue Team. They decided to save Olivia. The remaining contestants must bake a fruit tart in 90 minutes. Hetal and Shelly were the first to be sent to safety, leaving Christopher and Stephen to face elimination.; Immune: Olivia Crouppen; Bottom two: Christopher Lu and Stephen Lee; Eliminated: None
| 109 | 12 | "Family Reunion (Top 10)" | July 29, 2015 | 4.73 |
Team Challenge: The contestants were told that they would be cooking a family-style meal to be blind-tasted for a group of special diners that Gordon had invited. Each team had to create a family dinner consisting of an entrée, two sides and a dessert. The judges selected Derrick and Claudia as team captains, with Derrick getting first pick. Derrick chose Nick, Olivia, Christopher and Tommy, forming the Blue Team, while Claudia chose Katrina, Hetal, Stephen and Shelly, forming the Red Team. When the dishes were served to the guests, it was revealed that the ten guest judges were actually the contestants' family members. The Red Team was declared as winner with six votes against the Blue Team's four votes.; Team Challenge Winners/Immune: Claudia Sandoval, Hetal Vasavada, Katrina Kozar, Shelly Flash and Stephen Lee; Pressure Test: The judges announced that Derrick was exempt from participating in the pressure test. The remaining had to create a gnocchi dish finished in brown sage butter sauce in 25 minutes. Olivia's dish was deemed the best and was saved. Nick's dish was also good enough to move on, leaving Christopher and Tommy as the bottom two.; Immune: Derrick Peltz; Bottom two: Christopher Lu and Tommy Walton; Eliminated: Christopher Lu
| 110 | 13 | "A Little Southern Flare (Top 9)" | August 5, 2015 | 4.94 |
Mystery Box Challenge: The home cooks were tasked to create a flambéed dish using any of five different spirits in 45 minutes. The three judges also demonstrated how to flambé. The top three dishes were Tommy's, Katrina's, and Stephen's. The judges declared Stephen as the winner.; Challenge Winner/Immune: Stephen Lee; Elimination Test: Stephen was immune from the elimination test and was allowed to decide which Southern dish the remaining home cooks would be cooking. He was shown three different Southern foods. He selected chicken and waffles for the remaining contestants to cook in 60 minutes. Stephen was also allowed to single out one contestant who would only have 30 minutes to create the dish. Stephen chose Derrick to be singled out. Tommy and Hetal were deemed to have the best two dishes in this elimination challenge, making them team captains for the next team challenge. Derrick, Nick, Katrina, and Olivia's dishes are deemed good enough to move on. The bottom two dishes tonight belonged to Shelly and Claudia.; Winners: Hetal Vasavada and Tommy Walton; Bottom two: Claudia Sandoval and Shelly Flash; Eliminated: Shelly Flash
| 111 | 14 | "Getting A-Head in the Competition (Top 8)" | August 12, 2015 | 4.76 |
Team Challenge: This challenge would take place in the MasterChef restaurant for 50 VIP guests. Tommy and Hetal were selected as team captains for this team challenge, with Tommy getting first pick. Tommy chose Stephen, Katrina and Nick, forming the Red Team, while Hetal chose Derrick, Olivia and Claudia, forming the Blue Team. The judges announced that this would be the first ever vegetarian challenge. The Red Team was declared as the winner, sending the Blue Team into the pressure test.; Team Challenge Winners/Immune: Katrina Kozar, Nick Nappi, Stephen Lee and Tommy Walton; Pressure Test: The judges announced that the featured item of their dish was underneath mystery boxes of different sizes, to which the home cooks would be selecting one randomly. It was revealed that the cooks must create a dish made from the head meats of various animals in 60 minutes with a limited pantry. Claudia's dish was deemed the best and she was saved first, leaving Olivia, Derrick, and Hetal as the bottom three.; Bottom three: Derrick Peltz, Hetal Vasavada and Olivia Crouppen; Eliminated: Olivia Crouppen
| 112 | 15 | "A Storm's a Brewing (Top 7)" | August 19, 2015 | 4.66 |
Mystery Box Challenge: The home cooks will create a restaurant quality dish using coffee. The best three dishes were Derrick's, Hetal's, and Nick's. The judges declared Nick as the winner.; Challenge Winner/Immune: Nick Nappi; Team Challenge: The home cooks will require to re-create a summer party platter various foods. This challenge will be a tag team challenge. Nick was immune from the challenge and formed the tag teams. He paired up Stephen with Derrick, Katrina with Tommy, leaving Claudia and Hetal as the last team by default. Derrick and Stephen's party platter was deemed the best and they were made team captains in the next episode. Claudia and Hetal were sent to safety next, leaving Katrina and Tommy facing elimination.; Team Challenge Winners: Derrick Peltz and Stephen Lee; Bottom two: Katrina Kozar and Tommy Walton; Eliminated: Tommy Walton
| 113 | 16 | "The Restaurant Takeover (Top 6)" | August 26, 2015 | 4.61 |
Team Challenge: The top six chefs will split into two teams of three for the MasterChef restaurant takeover in a Japanese restaurant. Stephen and Derrick were selected as team captains for this challenge, with Stephen getting first pick. Stephen chose Nick and Claudia, forming the Red Team, while Derrick chose Katrina and Hetal, forming the Blue Team. They must complete two appetizer dishes and two entrée dishes. The Red Team was declared as the winner of the restaurant takeover, sending the Blue Team to face the pressure test.; Team Challenge Winners/Immune: Claudia Sandoval, Nick Nappi and Stephen Lee; Pressure Test: Derrick, Hetal and Katrina were needed to serve three of the judge's favorite pasta dishes. The home cooks had only one hour to perfect their pasta dishes. Derrick and Katrina each scored two out of three perfect pasta dishes, while Hetal scored none, resulting in her elimination.; Eliminated: Hetal Vasavada
| 114 | 17 | "Return of the Champions (Top 5)" | September 2, 2015 | TBD |
Mystery Box Challenge: The contestants will have to impress the judges with a single ingredient they selected at random, with only a standard staple pantry box to their aid. The top three dishes were Stephen's, Derrick's, and Claudia's. Claudia was the winner of the Mystery Box.; Challenge Winner/Immune: Claudia Sandoval; Elimination Test: Claudia would be safe from elimination. Claudia was allowed to select 20 of her favorite ingredients that she could see being included in her cookbook and placed them inside a basket, to which she would then select one of the remaining four home cooks to use in the upcoming elimination challenge. The remaining three baskets of ingredients were hand-picked by three past MasterChef champions: Christine Ha (season 3), Luca Manfè (season 4) and Courtney Lapresi (season 5). Claudia was allowed to select a basket for each of the remaining four contestants to cook. She gave her Mexican basket to Nick, Christine's Southeast Asian basket to Stephen, Luca's Italian basket to Katrina, and Courtney's baking basket to Derrick. Nick had the best dish of the night and Stephen also did good enough to be sent to safety leaving Derrick and Katrina to face elimination.; Winner: Nick Nappi; Bottom two: Derrick Peltz and Katrina Kozar; Eliminated: Katrina Kozar
| 115 | 18 | "Think Inside the Box (Top 4)" | September 9, 2015 | TBD |
Team Challenge: The top four will create a unique appetizer and entrée three times using special ingredients in Gordon and Graham's mystery boxes. As Nick won the previous Elimination Challenge, the teams would be chosen by him. Nick selected Claudia to form the Red Team, leaving Stephen and Derrick to form the Blue Team. The boxes were selected randomly. The judges decided that Stephen and Derrick were the winners of this challenge, securing their spots in the semifinals and sending Nick and Claudia into the penultimate pressure test of the season.; Team Challenge Winners/Immune: Derrick Peltz and Stephen Lee; Pressure Test: Claudia and Nick were shown an array of desserts. Christina chose her signature chocolate malted layer cake to which Nick and Claudia would need to recreate in 90 minutes.; Nick was eliminated and Claudia advanced to the semifinals to join Derrick and Stephen.; Eliminated: Nick Nappi
| 116 | 19 | "Team Gordon Ramsay (Top 3)" | September 16, 2015 | TBD |
Individual Challenge: The three semifinalists will be required to each create a unique dish for 30 guests in the restaurant in 75 minutes. The guests were all chefs and co-workers led by Gordon, Graham and Christina in their culinary businesses. The judges also announced that each of the semifinalists will also by receiving help from an eliminated contestant. Stephen got the help of Tommy, Claudia had Katrina, leaving Derrick with Hetal. With 15 out of the 30 votes, Derrick was announced as the winner of the challenge, securing his spot into the finale, while sending Stephen and Claudia into the final pressure test.; Team Challenge Winner/Immune: Derrick Peltz; Pressure Test: Stephen and Claudia will have to recreate three classic dishes in only one hour with the winner of this pressure test joining Derrick in the finale.; Eliminated: Stephen Lee
| 117 | 20 | "The Finale (Top 2)" | September 16, 2015 | TBD |
Season finale: Derrick and Claudia had to each create a beautiful appetizer, a stunning entrée and a magnificent dessert.; Appetizer: Derrick served spiced pork belly with watermelon three ways, while Claudia had a huitlacoche tamale with cactus salsa, avocado crema and pork skin chicharron.; Entrée: Derrick served pan seared venison with root vegetables and puff pastry cage, while Claudia served grilled swordfish with chickpeas, Mexican squash, and salsa verde.; Dessert: Derrick served lemon mousse in a chocolate shell with green tea cake and raspberry sauce, while Claudia served hibiscus-poached pear with key lime flan and cinnamon brittle.; Final Two: Claudia Sandoval and Derrick Peltz; Winner Revealed: The title of MasterChef US 2015, a $250,000 cash prize, and a cookbook deal went to Claudia.; MasterChef Winner: Claudia Sandoval

== Ratings ==
=== U.S. Nielsen ratings ===
| No. | Episode | Original air date | Rating/share 18–49 | U.S. viewers (million) | Rank (Timeslot) | Rank (Nightly) | Rank (Weekly) | Source(s) |
|---|---|---|---|---|---|---|---|---|
| 1 | "Let the Battle Commence" (Top 40) | May 20, 2015 | 1.2/4 | 3.39 | 3 | 8 | <25 | |
| 2 | "The Battle Continues" (Top 40) | May 20, 2015 | 1.2/4 | 3.39 | 3 | 8 | <25 | |
| 3 | "You're the Apple of My Eye" (Top 22) | May 27, 2015 | 1.6/6 | 4.72 | 1 | 1 | 5 | |
| 4 | "Cinnamon Roll-er Coaster" (Top 20) | June 3, 2015 | 1.5/6 | 4.70 | 2 | 2 | 12 | |
| 5 | "Clawing to Victory" (Top 19) | June 10, 2015 | 1.5/6 | 4.83 | 1 | 1 | 13 | |
| 6 | "What Happens in Vegas Steaks in Vegas" (Top 18) | June 17, 2015 | 1.5/6 | 4.83 | 1 | 1 | 10 | |
| 7 | "Bring Home the Bacon" (Top 16) | June 24, 2015 | 1.5/6 | 4.73 | 2 | 2 | 9 | |
| 8 | "Happy Birthday MASTERCHEF" (Top 14) | July 1, 2015 | 1.4/6 | 4.40 | 2 | 2 | 11 | |
| 9 | "Gordon's Greatest Hits" (Top 12) | July 8, 2015 | 1.7/6 | 4.93 | 2 | 2 | 8 | |
| 10 | "Rice Rice Baby" (Top 11) | July 15, 2015 | 1.5/6 | 4.86 | 3 | 3 | 11 | |
| 11 | "Moo-vers and Bakers" (Top 10) | July 22, 2015 | 1.5/6 | 4.44 | 2 | 3 | 10 | |
| 12 | "Family Reunion" (Top 10) | July 29, 2015 | 1.5/6 | 4.73 | 3 | 3 (tie) | UNKNOWN | |
| 13 | "A Little Southern Flare" (Top 9) | August 5, 2015 | 1.5/6 | 4.94 | 2 (tie) | 2 (tie) | 10 | |
| 14 | "Getting A-Head in the Competition" (Top 8) | August 12, 2015 | 1.4/6 | 4.76 | 3 | 3 | 10 | |
| 15 | "A Storm's a Brewing" (Top 7) | August 19, 2015 | 1.4/5 | 4.66 | 3 | 3 | 10 | |
| 16 | "The Restaurant Takeover" (Top 6) | August 26, 2015 | 1.4/5 | 4.61 | 3 | 3 | TBD | |
| 17 | "Return of the Champions" (Top 5) | September 2, 2015 | TBD | TBD | TBD | TBD | TBD | |
| 18 | "Think Inside the Box" (Top 4) | September 9, 2015 | TBD | TBD | TBD | TBD | TBD | |
| 19 | "Team Gordon Ramsay" (Top 3) | September 16, 2015 | 1.5/5 | 4.65 | 2 | 3 | TBD | |
| 20 | "The Finale" (Top 2) | September 16, 2015 | 1.5/5 | 4.65 | 2 | 3 | TBD | |
