= Christine Ha =

American chef and writer (born 1979)

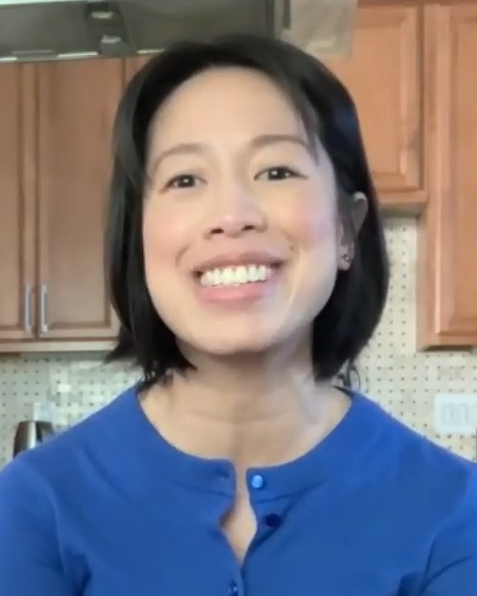
- Ha in 2021
- Born: Christine Huyentran Ha; May 9, 1979 (age 47); Los Angeles County, California, U.S.
- Other name: Hà Huyền Trân
- Education: University of Texas, Austin (BBA); University of Houston (MFA)
- Occupations: Chef, motivational speaker, author
- Years active: 2012–present
- Spouse: John Suh (m. 2010)
- Culinary career
- Cooking style: Vietnamese, Thai, Asian fusion, Southeast Asian, Southern, Japanese, Korean, Chinese, Indian
- Awards won: 2012 MasterChef; 2014 Helen Keller Personal Achievement Award
- Website: www.theblindcook.com

Christine Huyentran Ha (Vietnamese: Hà Huyền Trân; born May 9, 1979) is an American chef, writer and TV host. She was the first blind contestant of MasterChef and the winner of its third season in 2012.

== Early and personal life ==
Ha was born in Los Angeles County, California to Vietnamese parents who emigrated from Saigon (present day Ho Chi Minh City) to the United States in 1975 after the Vietnam War. She is an only child. She lived in Lakewood, California and Long Beach, California as a young child before her family moved to Houston, Texas. When Ha was 14, her mother died from lung cancer.

Ha graduated with a bachelor's degree in business administration and finance along with MIS from the University of Texas at Austin. She also earned a master's of fine arts in creative fiction and nonfiction from the University of Houston's nationally acclaimed writing program.

Ha has neuromyelitis optica, in which a person's own immune system attacks the optic nerves and spinal cord. In 2004, she was diagnosed and gradually started losing her vision, and was almost completely blind by 2007. She describes her vision as "looking at a very foggy mirror after a hot shower". She uses adaptive technologies to help her manage her social media profiles by herself. Ha utilizes the following assistive technologies around her house: VoiceOver, JAWS, Aira glasses, Amigo portable CCTV along with a thermometer, food scale and liquid level indicator that gives an oral reading.

Ha serves as fiction editor for Gulf Coast: A Journal of Literature and Fine Arts, and her work has appeared in Fire Point, The ScissorTale Review and PANK Magazine, among others. In January 2014, she began hosting the cooking show Four Senses on AMI-TV.

== Career ==
=== 2012: MasterChef USA & Recipes from My Home Kitchen: Asian and American Comfort Food ===
Midway through this year's competition, my money would not have been on Christine for the win – and not just because of her disability – because she just didn't come across as the typical frontrunner. With Christine, slow and steady won the race. She subtly climbed her way to the top by performing consistently well, triumphing over her own self-doubt, all the while maintaining her signature grace and integrity. It was thrilling to watch. And I can say with absolute confidence there was no one more deserving.

— Joe Bastianich, a judge on MasterChef

While she has never studied cooking, in the nineteen episodes where she competed on the third season of MasterChef, Ha won seven times in both individual and team challenges; additionally, she placed three times in the top three group. However, she was also in the bottom group twice. On September 10, 2012, Ha was announced the winner of the competition and was awarded $250,000, the MasterChef title, the MasterChef trophy, and a cookbook deal.

Her cookbook, Recipes from My Home Kitchen: Asian and American Comfort Food (ISBN 9781623360955), was released on May 14, 2013.

=== 2013–present: Four Senses, Masterchef Vietnam and guest appearances ===
In 2013, Ha began co-hosting the Canadian TV show Four Senses with Carl Heinrich, the winner of Season 2 of Top Chef Canada. It is a cooking show geared towards the visually impaired, and airs on AMI (Accessible Media, Inc.) TV, a Canadian cable network designed to make television accessible to the vision and hearing impaired. To compensate for the vision-impaired, the show contains a great deal of audio description, where they are narrating what's going on in the kitchen, what they're doing, how things feel or smell or sound.

In 2015, she revealed on her blog and Facebook page that she would become a judge on the third season of MasterChef Vietnam, having been a guest judge in the previous series, and a guest judge of US MasterChef (season 4), making her the first former contestant and winner worldwide to become a regular judge, and also one of a few female judges after Phan Tôn Tịnh Hải (also Masterchef Vietnam), Michal Ansky of Israel and Christina Tosi. In the meantime, she also returned along with Luca Manfé and Courtney Lapresi as guests of US MasterChef (season 6). Later in the year, she also made an appearance in MasterChef Celebrity Showdown in the battle of "Champions vs Juniors", where she, alongside Season 4 winner Luca Manfe and Season 6 winner Claudia Sandoval, cooked against 3 contestants from MasterChef Junior season 4 in a Salmon Wellington tag team battle. The three champions emerged as the winner and donate their winnings to their chosen charity.

She also revealed that she was the first chef/author to become the winner of Helen Keller Personal Achievement Award in 2014, an award given to people and organizations that "demonstrated outstanding achievement in improving quality of life for people with vision loss". Past/current winners included musicians Stevie Wonder, Ray Charles and Tom Sullivan, actor Charlie Cox (who portrayed a blind superhero, Matt Murdock/Daredevil, was awarded in June 2015) and businessman Bernard A. Newcomb.

She has also opened small-scale pop-up restaurants around the world in the 5 years since winning Master Chef (2012–2017).

The lady has an extraordinary palate, a palate of incredible finesse. She picks up hot ingredients, touches them, and she thinks about this image on the plate. She has the most disciplined execution on a plate that we've ever seen. But the palate is where it's just extraordinary. And honestly, I know chefs with Michelin stars that don't have palates like hers.

— Gordon Ramsay, a judge on MasterChef

She has traveled around the world to give TED talks about her life experiences as a blind cook and the lessons she has learned along the way. "Christine has also served as a culinary envoy on behalf of the American Embassy in cultural diplomacy programs in Jordan, Serbia, Bosnia and Herzegovina, and Croatia".

In 2018, Ha opened a Vietnamese gastropub in Bravery Chef Hall in Houston, Texas, named "The Blind Goat". The name is a combination of her disability and her Vietnamese zodiac sign. The Blind Goat received three stars from the Houston Chronicle and was named a semi-finalist for Best New Restaurant in America by the James Beard Foundation in 2020. In the same Bravery Chef Hall, she and her husband John Suh opened a Vietnamese restaurant called "The Sighted Pig Test Kitchen", which is a reference to her husband's Vietnamese zodiac sign. The menu is centered around authentic Vietnamese dishes, specifically drawing inspiration from Nhau cuisine. Beginning June 2018, Ha began working on her memoir and second cookbook.

At the start of 2020, Ha teamed up with Saigon House chef and owner, Tony Nguyen, to open Xin Chao restaurant in Houston. The menu showcases their Vietnamese-American heritage and culinary skills with a contemporary approach to traditional Vietnamese dishes with a touch of Texas BBQ and Gulf Coast seafood.

Preceded by Jennifer Behm	MasterChef winner 2012	Succeeded by Luca Manfé
