= MasterChef Vietnam =

Reality TV show

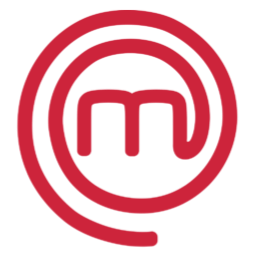
- Created by: Franc Roddam
- Judges: Luke Nguyễn; Hoàng Khải (The Judges Audition 08/03/2013 - 29/03/2013); Phan Tôn Tịnh Hải; Phạm Tuấn Hải (05/04/2013 - ?)
- Country of origin: Vietnam
- Original language: Vietnamese
- No. of episodes: 62

Production
- Production company: BHD Company - VTV

Original release
- Network: VTV
- Release: March 8, 2013 – January 7, 2018

MasterChef Vietnam is a reality TV show. MasterChef originates from BHD Company in United Kingdom with Vietnam Television buying copyright and implementation.

== Judges ==
Season	Judge 1	Judge 2	Judge 3
1	Hoàng Khải (Note: Hoàng Khải became the judge for the first 4 episodes); Phạm Tuấn Hải (Note: From episode 5, Phạm Tuấn Hải became the judge to replace Hoàng Khải)	Phan Tôn Tịnh Hải	Luke Nguyen
2	Phạm Tuấn Hải	Nguyễn Thị Kim Oanh	Luke Nguyen
3	Phạm Tuấn Hải	Christine Hà	Guest judges
4	Phạm Tuấn Hải	Phan Tôn Tịnh Hải	Jack Lee

== Series overview ==
Season	Contestants	Episodes	Originally released		Winner	Runner(s)-up
Season	Contestants	Episodes	First released	Last released	Winner	Runner(s)-up
1	17	20	March 8, 2013	July 19, 2013	Ngô Thanh Hòa	Phan Quốc Trí
2	12	15	July 19, 2014	October 26, 2014	Hoàng Minh Nhật	Lê Chi
3	13	15	September 5, 2015	December 12, 2015	Nguyễn Thanh Cường	Phạm Thị Tuyết
4	16	12	October 22, 2017	January 7, 2018	Kiwi Ngô Thị Mai Trang	Đỗ Nguyễn Hoàng Long & Vũ Đức Hải
