= Monti Carlo =

Puerto Rican chef and TV Host (born 1975)

- Born: Mairym Carlo; May 7, 1975 (age 51); Rio Piedras, Puerto Rico
- Occupations: Host, private chef, blogger
- Children: 1

Mairym “Monti” Carlo (born May 7, 1975) is a Puerto Rican-American Food TV Host and Special Events Chef. She blogs at islandgirlcooks.com. Monti hosts Food Network's Help My Yelp, a joint production between ITV and Yelp. She's also hosted the special Make My Food Famous for A&E's FYI Network and Nutritious Bites for PBS. She is a judge and contributor for multiple Food Network shows including Cutthroat Kitchen, SuperMarket Stakeout, and The Next Food Network Star. The James Beard Foundation Advisor was highlighted by The Spruce Eats as one of 2021's Culinarian's You Should Know. She placed fifth on Gordon Ramsay's MasterChef US Season 3.

== Early life and family ==
Monti was born in Río Piedras, Puerto Rico in 1975 but left the island for the mainland U.S. at six years old, returning periodically until 1993 when she permanently moved to the mainland. She has a twin brother. She lives in Hollywood, California with her child, Danger.

== Filmography ==
=== Television ===
Year	Title	Role	Notes
2012	MasterChef season 3	Herself/Contestant	Finished 5th place
2014	Make My Food Famous	Host	
2016	Cutthroat Kitchen	Judge	Season 12, Episode 7 "Shot Through the Tart"
2016	The Next Food Network Star	Judge	
2016	Chopped Junior	Judge	Season 2, Episode 3 "Dough Business"
2016	The Kitchen	Herself	Season 10, Episode 5 "Stove-Free Summer"
2016	Cooks vs. Cons	Judge	Season 2, Episode 9 "Chowder Chowdown"
2016	Clash of the Grandmas	Judge	Season 1, Episode 2 "Thanksgiving at Grandma's"
2016	Clash of the Grandmas	Judge	Season 1, Episode 4 "Christmas at Grandma's"
2017–2019	Best Thing I Ever Ate	Contributor	
2017	Help My Yelp	Host	
2019	SuperMarket Stakeout	Judge	
2020	Ramsay Redemption	Host	
2020	Make This Tonight	Host	
2020	Nutritious Bites	Host	
2021	James Beard Awards	Presenter	
2022	traDISHional	Host	
2022	Easy-Bake Battle	Judge	
