= MasterChef (American TV series) season 3 =

Season of television series

MasterChef
- Season 3
- Promotional poster for season 3, featuring (L to R) Graham Elliot, Gordon Ramsay, and Joe Bastianich.
- Judges: Joe Bastianich; Graham Elliot; Gordon Ramsay
- No. of contestants: 18
- Winner: Christine Hà
- Runner-up: Josh Marks
- No. of episodes: 20

Release
- Original network: Fox
- Original release: June 4 – September 10, 2012

Season chronology
- ← Previous; Season 2 Next → Season 4

The third season of the American competitive reality television series MasterChef had a 2-night premiere on Fox on June 4 and 5, 2012.

The season concluded on September 10, 2012, with the first blind contestant, Christine Hà, winning the MasterChef title, and Josh Marks becoming the runner-up.

== Top 18 ==
Contestant	Age	Hometown	Occupation	Status
Christine Hà	32	Houston, Texas	MFA Student	Winner September 10
Josh Marks	24	Jackson, Mississippi	Army Contract Specialist	Runner-Up September 10; Returned July 23; Eliminated July 16
Becky Reams	27	Stilwell, Kansas	Food Photographer	Eliminated September 4
Frank Mirando	28	Holbrook, New York	Stockbroker	Eliminated August 28
Mairym "Monti" Carlo	36	Los Angeles, California	Homemaker	Eliminated August 21
David Martinez	32	Chicago, Illinois	Educational Administrator	Eliminated August 14
Felix Fang	24	Hollywood, California	Food Runner	Eliminated July 24
Stacey Amagrande	29	Apple Valley, California	Farmers Market Manager	Eliminated July 17
Tali Clavijo	29	Chicago, Illinois	Musician	Eliminated July 9
Mike Hill	40	Powder Springs, Georgia	Contractor	Eliminated July 3
Tanya Noble	21	Austin, Texas	Sociology Student	Eliminated July 3
Anna Rossi	28	Boston, Massachusetts	Pharmaceutical Sales Rep	Eliminated July 2
Scott Little	38	Annandale, Virginia	Interactive Producer	Eliminated June 26
Ryan Umane	26	New York, New York	Unemployed	Eliminated June 25
Helene Leeds	35	Baldwin, Maryland	Health Coach	Eliminated June 19
Michael Chen	19	Austin, Texas	Meteorology Student	Eliminated June 18
Dave Mack	27	Davie, Florida	Caviar Sales Director	Eliminated June 12
Samantha De Silva	27	Miami, Florida	Design Consultant	Eliminated June 12

== Elimination table ==
Place	Contestant	Episode																									
Place	Contestant	4		5	6		7	8		9	10		11		12	13		14	15		16	17		18	19		20
1	Christine	IN	IN	PT	HIGH	WIN	WIN	IN	IN	IN	IN	IN	IN	LOW	WIN	IN	LOW	IMM	HIGH	IN	WIN	HIGH	WIN	WIN	WIN	LOW	WINNER
2	Josh	IN	IN	WIN	IN	WIN	PT	IN	IN	IN	IN	IN	HIGH	IN	ELIM			RET	IN	LOW	LOW	WIN	LOW	LOW	HIGH	WIN	RUNNER-UP
3	Becky	IN	IN	WIN	HIGH	IN	WIN	HIGH	LOW	WIN	WIN	IN	IN	IN	LOW	HIGH	IN	IMM	HIGH	WIN	WIN	IN	LOW	WIN	LOW	ELIM	
4	Frank	IN	WIN	PT	IN	LOW	NPT	HIGH	IN	WIN	HIGH	IN	IN	WIN	WIN	WIN	IMM	IMM	IN	WIN	NPT	IN	HIGH	ELIM			
5	Monti	IN	IN	WIN	IN	IN	NPT	IN	IN	PT	IN	WIN	IN	WIN	PT	IN	WIN	IMM	IN	IN	WIN	HIGH	ELIM				
6	David	IN	WIN	WIN	IN	IN	NPT	IN	IN	PT	IN	LOW	IN	LOW	WIN	HIGH	IN	IMM	WIN	LOW	ELIM						
7	Felix	WIN	IMM	PT	IN	IN	WIN	IN	LOW	IN	IN	IN	WIN	IN	NPT	IN	WIN	IMM	IN	ELIM							
8	Stacey	IN	IN	NPT	IN	IN	WIN	IN	WIN	WIN	IN	IN	HIGH	IN	WIN	IN	ELIM										
9	Tali	IN	LOW	PT	IN	LOW	LOW	IN	IN	WIN	IN	IN	IN	ELIM													
10	Mike	IN	IN	WIN	IN	LOW	WIN	IN	IN	IN	HIGH	ELIM															
10	Tanya	IN	IN	LOW	IN	IN	WIN	WIN	IMM	LOW	IN	ELIM															
12	Anna	IN	IN	WIN	IN	IN	PT	IN	IN	ELIM																	
13	Scott	LOW	IN	LOW	IN	IN	WIN	IN	ELIM																		
14	Ryan	LOW	IN	WIN	WIN	IMM	ELIM																				
15	Helene	IN	LOW	WIN	IN	ELIM																					
16	Michael	IN	IN	ELIM																							
17	Dave	IN	ELIM																								
18	Samantha	ELIM																									

(WINNER) This cook won the competition.
(RUNNER-UP) This cook finished in second place.
(WIN) The cook won the individual challenge (Mystery Box Challenge or Elimination Test).
(WIN) The cook was on the winning team in the Team Challenge and directly advanced to the next round.
(HIGH) The cook was one of the top entries in an individual challenge but didn't win.
(IN) The cook wasn't selected as a top or bottom entry in an individual challenge.
(IN) The cook wasn't selected as a top or bottom entry in a Team Challenge.
(IMM) The cook didn't have to compete in that round of the competition and was safe from elimination.
(PT) The cook was on the losing team in the Team Challenge, competed in the Pressure Test, and advanced.
(NPT) The cook was on the losing team in the Team Challenge, did not compete in the Pressure Test, and advanced.
(RET) The cook won the Reinstation Challenge and returned to the competition.
(LOW) The cook was one of the bottom entries in an individual challenge or Pressure Test, but advanced.
(LOW) The cook was one of the bottom entries in the Team Challenge, but advanced.
(ELIM) The cook was eliminated from Masterchef.

=== Guest judges ===
- Paula Deen - Episode 13

== Episodes ==
No. overall	No. in season	Title	Original release date	U.S. viewers (millions)
34	1	"Auditions #1"	June 4, 2012	n/a
Audition 1: The people that earned a white apron today include Michael, Monti, Scott, Tali, Ryan, Josh, Audrey, Samantha, Becky, Helene, and Christine.
35	2	"Auditions #2"	June 5, 2012	n/a
Audition 2: The people that earned a white apron today include Felix, Raiza, Josue, Tanya, Mike, Bubba, Anna, and Frank. Anna and AJ are the first husband and wife pair to advance.
36	3	"Auditions #3/Top 36 Bootcamp"	June 11, 2012	n/a
Audition 3 and Top 36 Boot Camp: The auditions ended with Stacey and David gaining aprons. Afterwards, the top 36 contestants were tasked with cooking a ground beef dish. After inspection, the contestants were divided into three groups of twelve. The first group was eliminated, the second, consisting of Becky, Felix, Frank, Helene, Josh, Michael, Mike, Ryan, Samantha, Scott, Stacey, and Tali, advanced automatically. The third group: Anna, AJ, Bubba, Christine, Courtney, Dave, David, Monti, Nandini, Rami, Sheri, and Tanya, had their dishes tasted. The first group to be tasted were Anna, AJ, Dave and Tanya. Dave, Tanya and Anna advanced. The second group consisted of Bubba, Christine, Monti and Nandini. The judges advanced Monti and Christine. The last group consisted of Courtney, David, Rami and Sheri. After eliminating Courtney and Sheri, the judges gave David the last spot and eliminated Rami.
37	4	"Top 18 Compete"	June 12, 2012	n/a
Mystery Box Challenge: The top eighteen had to cook items out of their Mystery Boxes. Ryan, Samantha, and Scott were called forward for having the worst dishes, with the judges announcing that they had revised the rules and anyone could be eliminated at any time during the competition.; Bottom three: Ryan Umane, Samantha De Silva and Scott Little; Scott was the first to be sent to safety, leaving Ryan and Samantha facing elimination. Samantha was eliminated. Felix was then declared the winner of the challenge.; Eliminated: Samantha De Silva; Challenger Winner/Immune: Felix Fang; Elimination Test: Felix got to choose the subject for the first Elimination Test, the theme being the dishes that intimidate the judges the most. Felix chose the risotto. Felix was also exempt from competing. David and Frank had the best two dishes, making them team captains for the first team challenge.; Winners: David Martinez and Frank Mirando; Bottom three: Dave Mack, Helene Leeds and Tali Clavijo; Eliminated: Dave Mack
38	5	"Top 16 Compete"	June 18, 2012	n/a
Team Challenge: The remaining sixteen contestants were tasked with feeding an army of two hundred and one Marines. David chose Becky, Josh, Mike, Helene, Ryan, Anna, and Monti for the Red Team, while Frank chose Felix, Scott, Stacey, Tali, Tanya and Michael, and was left with Christine for the Blue Team. Each Marine would vote for the entrée they preferred, and the team with the most votes would win the challenge. The Red Team won by sixteen votes.; Team Challenge Winners/Immune: Anna Rossi, Becky Reams, David Martinez, Helene Leeds, Josh Marks, Mike Hill, Monti Carlo and Ryan Umane; Pressure Test: Frank was allowed to exempt one Blue Team member from competing in the Pressure Test. After Felix and Scott both declined, he saved Stacey. The task was to bake an apple pie. Christine and Frank had the best pies. Felix and Tali also advanced.; Immune: Stacey Amagrande; Bottom three: Michael Chen, Scott Little and Tanya Noble; Eliminated: Michael Chen
39	6	"Top 15 Compete"	June 19, 2012	n/a
Mystery Box Challenge: The contestants each had to create a dish using offal. Becky, Ryan, and Christine were the top three. Ryan was the winner.; Challenge Winner/Immune: Ryan Umane; Elimination Test: Immune from the test, Ryan chose every other chef to cook crab. He was then allowed to decide who would be cooking live crab and who would be using canned crab. Ryan gave the live crab to Christine, David, Helene, Mike, Scott, Tali, and Tanya. Anna, Becky, Felix, Frank, Josh, Monti, and Stacey received the canned crab. The judges deemed Christine's and Josh's as the best two dishes, making the two team captains for the next Team Challenge.; Winners: Christine Hà and Josh Marks; Bottom four: Frank Mirando, Helene Leeds, Mike Hill and Tali Clavijo; Eliminated: Helene Leeds
40	7	"Top 14 Compete"	June 25, 2012	n/a
Team Challenge: The contestants had to cook breakfast for an entire hotel. Christine chose Felix, Scott, Tanya, Mike, Stacey, and Ryan for the Red Team. Josh chose Becky, Frank, Anna, Monti, David, and Tali for the Blue Team. The judges then told Christine that she could swap one member of her team for one from the Blue Team. Christine swapped Ryan in exchange for Becky. The teams had ninety minutes for prep and ninety minutes to serve. With 60% of the guest preference vote, the Red Team won the challenge.; Team Challenge Winners/Immune: Becky Reams, Christine Hà, Felix Fang, Mike Hill, Scott Little, Stacey Amagrande and Tanya Noble; Pressure Test: The judges rewarded David, Frank, and Monti by exempting them from the Pressure Test. Anna, Josh, Ryan, and Tali had to bake a molten lava cake, only having four chances to get it right. Anna and Josh advanced into the next stage of the competition.; Immune: David Martinez, Frank Mirando and Monti Carlo; Bottom two: Ryan Umane and Tali Clavijo; Eliminated: Ryan Umane
41	8	"Top 13 Compete"	June 26, 2012	n/a
Mystery Box Challenge: The contestants found a T-bone steak among other ingredients inside their mystery boxes. The best three dishes were Frank's, Tanya's, and Becky's. Tanya won.; Challenge Winner/Immune: Tanya Noble; Elimination Test: The theme was the judges' favorite desserts. Along with immunity, Tanya got to choose who made which dessert. Tanya gave Gordon's English trifle to Becky, Josh, Monti, and Stacey; Graham's strawberry shortcake to Christine, Mike, Scott, and Tali; and Joe's tiramisu to Anna, David, Felix, and Frank. Stacey had the best dessert, making her a team captain for the next challenge. The bottom three were Felix, Scott, and Becky, who had the worst tiramisu, strawberry shortcake, and trifle, respectively.; Winner: Stacey Amagrande; Bottom three: Becky Reams, Felix Fang and Scott Little; Eliminated: Scott Little
42	9	"Top 12 Compete"	July 2, 2012	n/a
Team Challenge: This challenge consisted of three teams - Red, Yellow, and Blue. Stacey was given the task of forming the teams. Stacey led the Red Team with Tali, Frank, and Becky. She then put Monti, David, Anna, and Tanya on the Yellow Team, leaving Christine, Felix, Josh, and Mike as the Blue Team by default. The Yellow Team elected Anna as their leader, and Josh volunteered to lead the Blue Team. The teams' task was to each operate a food truck at Venice Beach, with the Red Team selling Mexican cuisine, the Yellow Team selling American cuisine, and the Blue Team selling Indian cuisine. All profits made would go to charity. The Red Team won the challenge with $798 in sales, and the Blue Team claimed second place with $756, leaving the Yellow Team to face the Pressure Test after earning only $602.; Team Challenge Winners/Immune: Becky Reams, Frank Mirando, Stacey Amagrande and Tali Clavijo; Immune: Christine Hà, Felix Fang, Josh Marks and Mike Hill; Pressure Test: The task was to make tortellinis from scratch. David had the best tortellinis. Monti also advanced.; Bottom two: Anna Rossi and Tanya Noble; Eliminated: Anna Rossi
43	10	"Top 11 Compete"	July 3, 2012	n/a
Mystery Box Challenge: The contestants were tasked with cooking with ingredients including a rabbit leg and forbidden rice. The best three dishes were Frank's, Mike's, and Becky's. Becky was the winner.; Challenge Winner: Becky Reams; Elimination Test: Becky was able to choose which piece of equipment she would use to cook her dish and what her competitors would work with. Becky chose the deep fryer for herself and the pizza stone for the rest of the contestants. Monti won the challenge.; Winner: Monti Carlo; Bottom three: David Martinez, Mike Hill and Tanya Noble; Eliminated: Mike Hill and Tanya Noble
44	11	"Top Nine Compete"	July 9, 2012	n/a
Mystery Box Challenge: The contestants were each tasked with creating a dish using a live sea urchin, or uni. After a demonstration from Gordon, the contestants were given sixty minutes to prepare their dishes. The top were Felix, Josh, and Stacey. Felix won.; Challenge Winner: Felix Fang; Elimination Test: Felix was presented with nine different types of fish and was able to decide who was to cook which fish. Felix selected the halibut for herself, the rock fish for Becky, the salmon for Christine, the yellowtail for David, the catfish for Frank, the sardines for Josh, the John Dory for Monti, the striped bass for Stacey, and the Arctic char for Tali. Frank and Monti had the best two dishes and were selected as the team captains for the next Team Challenge.; Winners: Frank Mirando and Monti Carlo; Bottom three: Christine Hà, David Martinez and Tali Clavijo; Eliminated: Tali Clavijo
45	12	"Top 8 Compete"	July 16, 2012	n/a
Team Challenge: The contestants were tasked with feeding 101 cowboys and cowgirls. Frank picked Becky, Josh, and Felix for the Red Team, while Monti picked Stacey, David, and was left with Christine on the Blue Team. Frank and Monti were then forced to switch teams. Each cowboy and cowgirl would vote for the dish that he or she preferred, and the first team to 51 votes would win the challenge. The Blue Team was able to secure the win.; Team Challenge Winners/Immune: Christine Hà, David Martinez, Frank Mirando and Stacey Amagrande; Pressure Test: The judges asked the Red Team to select one cook to be saved from the Pressure Test. The decision effectively fell to Monti and she selected Felix. The other three had to cook eggs four different ways at once. Monti had the best eggs.; Immune: Felix Fang; Bottom two: Becky Reams and Josh Marks; Eliminated: Josh Marks
46	13	"Top 7 Compete"	July 17, 2012	n/a
Mystery Box Challenge: The contestants entered the kitchen to find a huge mystery box, inside of which was Paula Deen, who would serve as a guest judge. The contestants worked with ingredients from southern cuisine. The three best dishes were Becky's, Frank's, and David's. The judges and Paula declared Frank the winner of the Mystery Box.; Challenge Winner/Immune: Frank Mirando; Elimination Test: Frank was shown a sampler of Japanese cuisine. After awarding Frank with immunity, the judges revealed that the other six contestants would be divided into three pairs to replicate the sampler; one team member would cook while the other would direct, swapping roles every fifteen minutes. Frank was able to form the teams. He paired Becky with David, Felix with Monti, and Christine with Stacey. Felix and Monti had the best sampler and Christine and Stacey had the worst.; Winners: Felix Fang and Monti Carlo; Bottom two: Christine Hà and Stacey Amagrande; Eliminated: Stacey Amagrande
47	14	"Top 6 Compete, Part 1"	July 23, 2012	n/a
Special Mystery Box Challenge: The final six were surprised by being told that they would not have to cook anything this episode, and that instead the eight contestants eliminated prior (Stacey, Josh, Tali, Tanya, Mike, Anna, Scott, and Ryan) would return for a Mystery Box challenge, with the top two getting the opportunity to win back their place in the competition. Josh and Ryan ended up as the top two.; Special Pressure Test: Josh and Ryan had to each create a fruit tart, with the six remaining contestants blindly tasting and voting for their favorite. All six contestants voted for Josh's tart, earning him a return to the competition.; Reinstated: Josh Marks
48	15	"Top 6 Compete, Part 2"	July 24, 2012	n/a
Mystery Box Challenge: The final seven were asked to make a dish featuring prawns, which they would have to fish out of an aquarium they each got. The three best dishes were Becky's, Christine's, and David's. David won the challenge.; Challenge Winner: David Martinez; Elimination Test: The theme of the challenge were savoury desserts. David chose the corn as the ingredient and was shown three examples of corn desserts in order to give him ideas. The judges decided the two best dishes were Becky's and Frank's, making them team captains for the next team challenge.; Winners: Becky Reams and Frank Mirando; Bottom three: David Martinez, Felix Fang and Josh Marks; Eliminated: Felix Fang
49	16	"Top 6 Compete, Part 3"	August 14, 2012	n/a
Team Challenge: The cooks were brought to Hatfield's restaurant and told that they would be running the kitchen that night, with Gordon expediting, Graham as sous chef and Joe as the head waiter. The Red Team was led by Becky with Christine and Monti, and the Blue Team was led by Frank with David and was left with Josh. The contestants would be taught how to make the restaurant's menu from the owners, who would also be diners for the service. The judges declared the women the winners based on overall feedback.; Team Challenge Winners/Immune: Becky Reams, Christine Hà and Monti Carlo; Pressure Test: Frank was allowed to exempt a member of his team. He saved himself. David and Josh had to cook three filet mignon steaks: one rare, one medium-rare, and one well done.; Immune: Frank Mirando; Eliminated: David Martinez
50	17	"Top 5 Compete"	August 21, 2012	n/a
Mystery Box Challenge: The home cooks were allowed to fill a Mystery Box with up to fifteen ingredients of their choosing. Gordon then asked them to give their ingredients to the cook in front of them. Thus, Christine wound up with Becky's ingredients, Monti ended up with Christine's Asian ingredients, Frank wound up with Monti's dessert box, Josh ended up with Frank's Italian ingredients, and Becky received Josh's southern-cuisine ingredients. Josh beat out Monti and Christine to win.; Challenge Winner: Josh Marks; Elimination Test: Given three dishes made by Graham, Josh chose everyone to make his white tuna dish, being given a basket containing all the necessary ingredients. Graham told the contestants that they may improve upon his dish if they deemed it necessary. Christine had the best dish.; Winner: Christine Hà; Bottom three: Becky Reams, Josh Marks and Monti Carlo; Eliminated: Monti Carlo
51	18	"Top 4 Compete"	August 28, 2012	n/a
Team Challenge: The home cooks were asked to prepare a three course meal in pairs for the judges, plus French chefs Guy Savoy, Daniel Boulud, and Alain Ducasse. For winning the last challenge, Christine gets to pick her teammate. She chose Becky as her teammate on the Red Team, leaving Frank and Josh as the Blue Team. The judges opted for the Red Team's appetizer, the Blue Team's entrée, and finally the Red Team's dessert, giving Becky and Christine the win.; Team Challenge Winners/Immune: Becky Reams and Christine Hà; Pressure Test: Frank and Josh had to make three soufflés in an hour. Josh defeated Frank two dishes to one, eliminating him.; Eliminated: Frank Mirando
52	19	"Top 3 Compete"	September 4, 2012	n/a
Mystery Box Challenge: The home cooks were tasked to cook a signature entree for their potential cookbook in 60 minutes. Christine's was named as the winning dish and Josh came second.; Challenge Winner: Christine Hà; Elimination Test: The test was to cook one of three legs of meat. Christine got the first pick and chose chicken legs. Josh then chose lamb legs, leaving Becky with frog legs. Josh had the best dish and became the first finalist.; Winner: Josh Marks; Bottom two: Becky Reams and Christine Hà; Eliminated: Becky Reams
53	20	"Winner Chosen"	September 10, 2012	n/a
Season Final: Christine and Josh were given two hours to create a three-course menu of their choosing.; Appetizer: Christine's is Thai papaya salad with crab and mixed vegetables; Josh's is butter poached lobster with grits and sweet potato purée.; Entree: Christine's is braised pork belly with rice, crispy kale and maitake mushrooms; Josh's is rack of lamb with green curry sauce, spring peas, carrots, and parsnip purée.; Dessert: Christine's is coconut lime sorbet with a ginger tuile; Josh's is bacon crusted pecan pie with vanilla bean and cinnamon ice cream.; Final Two: Christine Hà and Josh Marks; Winner Revealed: Christine Hà was pronounced the winner of the competition, taking away $250,000, the MasterChef title, and a cookbook deal. In addition, she became the first blind and Asian contestant to win the title.; MasterChef Winner: Christine Hà
