= MasterChef (American TV series) season 2 =

Season of television series

MasterChef
- Season 2
- Judges: Joe Bastianich; Graham Elliot; Gordon Ramsay
- No. of contestants: 18
- Winner: Jennifer Behm
- Runner-up: Adrien Nieto
- No. of episodes: 20

Release
- Original network: Fox
- Original release: June 6 – August 16, 2011

Season chronology
- ← Previous; Season 1 Next → Season 3

The second season of the American competitive reality television series MasterChef had a two-night premiere on Fox on June 6 and 7, 2011.

The season concluded on August 16, 2011, with former Miss USA contestant Jennifer Behm as the winner, and Adrien Nieto as the runner-up. Unlike the previous winner, Behm's prize did not include a cookbook deal.

== Top 18 ==
Contestant	Age	Hometown	Occupation	Status
Jennifer Behm	34	Wilmington, Delaware	Realtor	Winner August 16
Adrien Nieto	28	Ventura, California	Server	Runner-Up August 16
Christian Collins	31	Gloucester, Massachusetts	Stay-at-home dad	Eliminated August 16
Suzy Singh	27	Chicago, Illinois	Neural Engineer	Eliminated August 15
Ben Starr	33	Dallas, Texas	Travel Writer	Eliminated August 9
Tracy Kontos	32	Coral Springs, Florida	Sales Consultant	Eliminated August 8
Derrick Prince	33	West Babylon, New York	Web Designer/Blogger	Eliminated August 2
Christine Corley	27	Sopchoppy, Florida	Single Mom	Eliminated August 2
Alejandra Schrader	37	Playa del Rey, California	Architect/Urban Planner	Eliminated July 26
Giuseppe Morisco	38	Chicago, Illinois	Granite Salesman	Eliminated July 19
Erryn Cobb	26	Chicago, Illinois	Public Relations	Eliminated July 18
Esther Kang	28	Los Angeles, California	Lawyer	Eliminated July 11
Jennie Kelley	37	Dallas, Texas	Musician	Eliminated July 5
Max Kramer	18	New York, New York	College Student	Eliminated June 28
Alvin Schultz	28	Houston, Texas	Retail Manager	Eliminated June 27
Tony Scruggs	52	Grant Park, Illinois	Trucker	Eliminated June 21
Angel Moore-Soukkay	37	Columbus, Ohio	Property Manager	Eliminated June 20
Mark Raffaeli	35	Chicago, Illinois	Realtor	Eliminated June 20

== Elimination table ==
Place	Contestant	Episode																							
Place	Contestant	5		6	7		8	9		10	11		12	13		14	15		16	17		18	19		20
1	Jennifer	IN	IN	LOW	LOW	IN	WIN	WIN	IN	PT	WIN	LOW	WIN	IN	LOW	PT	WIN	IN	PT	HIGH	LOW	WIN	LOW	IN	WINNER
2	Adrien	IN	IN	WIN	WIN	IN	NPT	HIGH	LOW	WIN	IN	LOW	WIN	WIN	IN	PT	HIGH	IN	LOW	HIGH	LOW	WIN	WIN	WIN	RUNNER-UP
3	Christian	WIN	IMM	PT	IN	IN	WIN	LOW	WIN	WIN	IN	IN	WIN	HIGH	WIN	PT	IN	IN	WIN	IN	LOW	PT	HIGH	ELIM	
4	Suzy	HIGH	IN	WIN	IN	IN	WIN	IN	IN	LOW	IN	IN	PT	IN	LOW	WIN	HIGH	WIN	WIN	IN	WIN	ELIM			
5	Ben	LOW	IN	WIN	IN	IN	NPT	IN	WIN	PT	IN	IN	PT	HIGH	IN	WIN	IN	LOW	WIN	WIN	ELIM				
6	Tracy	IN	IN	PT	HIGH	WIN	WIN	IN	IN	PT	IN	WIN	WIN	IN	IN	WIN	IN	WIN	ELIM						
7	Christine	IN	IN	WIN	IN	IN	LOW	IN	IN	LOW	IN	IN	WIN	IN	WIN	WIN	IN	ELIM							
7	Derrick	IN	WIN	WIN	IN	IN	NPT	IN	IN	WIN	HIGH	IN	LOW	IN	IN	PT	IN	ELIM							
9	Alejandra	IN	IN	PT	HIGH	IN	WIN	HIGH	LOW	WIN	HIGH	IN	LOW	IN	ELIM										
10	Giuseppe	IN	IN	PT	IN	IN	WIN	IN	IN	WIN	IN	WIN	ELIM												
11	Erryn	IN	LOW	WIN	IN	IN	WIN	IN	IN	WIN	IN	ELIM													
12	Esther	IN	IN	LOW	IN	WIN	NPT	IN	IN	ELIM															
13	Jennie	HIGH	IN	WIN	IN	LOW	NPT	IN	ELIM																
14	Max	IN	WIN	PT	IN	LOW	ELIM																		
15	Alvin	IN	IN	WIN	IN	ELIM																			
16	Tony	IN	IN	ELIM																					
17	Angel	IN	ELIM																						
17	Mark	IN	ELIM																						

(WINNER) This cook won the competition.
(RUNNER-UP) This cook finished in second place.
(WIN) The cook won the individual challenge (Mystery Box Challenge or Elimination Test).
(WIN) The cook was on the winning team in the Team Challenge and directly advanced to the next round.
(HIGH) The cook was one of the top entries in the individual challenge, but didn't win.
(IN) The cook wasn't selected as a top or bottom entry in an individual challenge.
(IMM) The cook didn't have to compete in that round of competition and was safe from elimination.
(PT) The cook was on the losing team in the Team Challenge, competed in the Pressure Test, and advanced.
(NPT) The cook was on the losing team in the Team Challenge, did not compete in the Pressure Test, and advanced.
(LOW) The cook was one of the bottom entries in an individual challenge or Pressure Test, but advanced.
(ELIM) The cook was eliminated from MasterChef.

== Episodes ==
No. overall	No. in season	Title	Original release date	U.S. viewers (millions)
14	1	"Audition #1"	June 6, 2011	n/a
Audition 1: The people that earned a white apron today include Jennifer, Albert, Monica, Erryn, Kayla, Yi Lynne, Tracy, Angel, Pauline and Christian.
15	2	"Audition #2"	June 7, 2011	n/a
Audition 2: The people that earned a white apron today include Dustin, Christine, Derrick, Esther, Alvin, Kyle, Tony and Alejandra.
16	3	"Audition #3/Top 38 Revealed"	June 13, 2011	n/a
Audition 3: The people that earned a white apron today include Suzy, Max, Giuseppe, Adrien, Joseph, and Ben.
17	4	"Top 18 Revealed"	June 14, 2011	n/a
Skills Challenge: The 38 contestants must demonstrate their knife work by creating perfectly even slices of green apple. They must continue slicing until stopped by one of the judges, when they find out if they are going through or going home. Twenty-four contestants remained after this round.; Invention Test: The remaining contestants must prepare a meal using chicken. Kyle, Aaron, Rhonda, Joey, Albert and Seby failed. The other 18 made the grade.
18	5	"2 Eliminated / Top 16 Revealed"	June 20, 2011	n/a
Mystery Box Challenge: The contestants had to prepare a dish using only the Mystery Box ingredients. Ben's dish earned him last place in the challenge. Suzy, Christian, and Jennie had the best dishes. Christian won the challenge. His prize was to choose the style of food that everyone would cook for the elimination challenge.; Challenge Winner/Immune: Christian Collins; Elimination Test: The theme for this challenge was the cuisine of Europe. Christian chose French cuisine and also received safety from elimination and the others had one hour to make their French dish. Derrick and Max had the best dishes and would become team captains in the next challenge. Giuseppe, Suzy, Alejandra, Jennie, and Christine are judged to have done enough to move on.; Winners: Derrick Prince and Max Kramer; Bottom three: Angel Moore-Soukkay, Erryn Cobb and Mark Raffaeli; Eliminated: Angel Moore-Soukkay and Mark Raffaeli
19	6	"Top 16 Compete"	June 21, 2011	n/a
Team Challenge: The contestants were split into two teams: the Red Team consisting of Derrick, Ben, Adrien, Erryn, Jennie, Suzy, Christine, and Alvin; and the Blue Team consisting of Max, Jennifer, Giuseppe, Esther, Tony, Alejandra, Christian and Tracy . The teams had to create a five-course meal for 350 office workers in the building. The service had to consist of soup, a salad, pizza, a special entrée and dessert. At the end of service, each diner would vote for their favorite dish. The Red Team wins and send the Blue Team to the first Pressure Test of the season.; Team Challenge Winners/Immune: Adrien Nieto, Alvin Schultz, Ben Starr, Christine Corley, Derrick Prince, Erryn Cobb, Jennie Kelley and Suzy Singh; Pressure Test: The Blue Team members had to an hour to cook ravioli from scratch. Alejandra, Max, Tracy, Giuseppe and Christian were the first five to be sent to safety for producing good enough raviolis.; Bottom three: Esther Kang, Jennifer Behm and Tony Scruggs; Eliminated: Tony Scruggs
20	7	"Top 15 Compete"	June 27, 2011	n/a
Mystery Box Challenge: The contestants had to prepare a dish using only the Mystery Box ingredients. Alejandra, Adrien and Tracy landed in the top three. Adrien won and got the opportunity to choose the theme for himself, and then everyone else in the elimination challenge.; Challenge Winner: Adrien Nieto; Elimination Test: The theme for the challenge was dessert. He chose nuts for himself and coffee for everyone else to use. The contestants had 90 minutes to prepare a dessert. Tracy and Esther were declared the top two and became team captains for the next challenge. Adrien, Christine, Alejandra, Suzy, and Jennifer's desserts are deemed good enough to move on.; Winners: Esther Kang and Tracy Kontos; Bottom three: Alvin Schultz, Jennie Kelley and Max Kramer; Eliminated: Alvin Schultz
21	8	"Top 14 Compete"	June 28, 2011	n/a
Team Challenge: The contestants were split into two teams: the Blue Team consisting of Tracy, Suzy, Giuseppe, Christian, Jennifer, Erryn, and Alejandra, and the Red Team consisting of Esther, Max, Ben, Christine, Jennie, Derrick, and Adrien. They were given 90 minutes to prepare sausage sandwiches for 101 bikers who would vote on which one was the best. The Blue Team received 51 votes first for the win, sending the Red Team to the Pressure Test.; Team Challenge Winners/Immune: Alejandra Schrader, Christian Collins, Erryn Cobb, Giuseppe Morisco, Jennifer Behm, Suzy Singh and Tracy Kontos; Pressure Test: Chef Ramsay announced that only two chefs would compete in the pressure test. He asked Esther to choose the two chefs most responsible for the loss to which she said Max and Christine. In the Pressure Test, Max and Christine were given three filets of steak to cook rare, medium, and well done.; Immune: Adrien Nieto, Ben Starr, Derrick Prince, Esther Kang and Jennie Kelley; Bottom two: Christine Corley and Max Kramer; Eliminated: Max Kramer
22	9	"Top 13 Compete"	July 5, 2011	n/a
Mystery Box Challenge: The Mystery Box contained items used to create a vegetarian entrée. Jennifer, Adrien and Alejandra landed in the top three, and Jennifer won the challenge.; Challenge Winner: Jennifer Behm; Elimination Test: Jennifer was given three dishes cooked by last year's MasterChef winner Whitney Miller to choose from for everybody to cook. She chose a catfish dish. The contestants had to recreate the dish with no recipe while Jennifer was given a basket of all ingredients needed to cook the dish. Christian and Ben were declared the best and became captains in the next team challenge.; Winners: Ben Starr and Christian Collins; Bottom three: Adrien Nieto, Alejandra Schrader and Jennie Kelley; Eliminated: Jennie Kelley
23	10	"Top 12 Compete"	July 11, 2011	n/a
Team Challenge: The contestants arrived at Gordon Ramsay's restaurant at the London West Hollywood hotel, where they were split up into teams by captains Christian and Ben. Ben's Blue Team consisted of Jennifer, Tracy, Esther, Suzy, and Christine, while Christian's Red Team consisted of Derrick, Adrien, Alejandra, Giuseppe, and Erryn. The teams were responsible for catering a Hollywood party and prepared hors d'oeuvres for all the guests. The winners would be decided per course by guests' votes. The Red Team took the starter with 64% of the votes, the Blue Team had a comeback on the entrée with a clean sweep of 100% of the votes, and the Red Team took the dessert course and the challenge with 53% of the vote, with the Blue Team up for the Pressure Test.; Team Challenge Winners/Immune: Adrien Nieto, Alejandra Schrader, Christian Collins, Derrick Prince, Erryn Cobb and Giuseppe Morisco; Pressure Test: Everyone on the Blue Team was given two hours to make a cake with a minimum of 6 layers. Ben's and Jennifer's were deemed the best, and Tracy's chiffon cake was also deemed delicious.; Bottom three: Christine Corley, Esther Kang and Suzy Singh; Eliminated: Esther Kang
24	11	"Top 11 Compete"	July 18, 2011	n/a
Mystery Box Challenge: The contestants had a lobster in their Mystery Box. Derrick, Alejandra and Jennifer were the top three. Jennifer won.; Challenge Winner: Jennifer Behm; Elimination Test: In this challenge with an aphrodisiac theme, Jennifer got to pick from core ingredients for everyone to cook with. She picked truffle and was given the option to watch everyone cook but she decided to stay and cook with everyone else. Tracy and Giuseppe were the top two and named captains for the next team challenge.; Winners: Giuseppe Morisco and Tracy Kontos; Bottom three: Adrien Nieto, Erryn Cobb and Jennifer Behm; Eliminated: Erryn Cobb
25	12	"Top 10 Compete"	July 19, 2011	n/a
Team Challenge: Tracy led the Blue team, with Adrien, Jennifer, Christian, and Christine as her brigade, and Giuseppe led the Red team, with Alejandra, Ben, Suzy, and Derrick as his brigade. The team captains were able to spend a few minutes alone with the judges' mothers to find out what they liked, as they were the judges for this contest. The Blue Team won the challenge.; Team Challenge Winners/Immune: Adrien Nieto, Christian Collins, Christine Corley, Jennifer Behm and Tracy Kontos; Pressure Test: The Red Team were given 30 minutes to create the perfect Eggs Benedict. Ben and Suzy were the only two to cook competent dishes.; Bottom three: Alejandra Schrader, Derrick Prince and Giuseppe Morisco; Eliminated: Giuseppe Morisco
26	13	"Top 9 Compete"	July 26, 2011	n/a
Mystery Box Challenge: The contestants found some hand-dived scallops in their Mystery Boxes. The top three consisted of Christian, Adrien and Ben. Adrien's dish won.; Challenge Winner: Adrien Nieto; Elimination Test: Adrien got to choose between nine different cuts of pork, ranging from easy to hard. He chose double cut pork chops for himself, pork belly for Suzy, cheeks for Christian, ground pork for Jennifer, bacon for Tracy, baby back ribs for Christine, boneless center cut pork loin for Alejandra, pork butt for Ben, and St. Louis style ribs for Derrick. The contestants only got one hour to cook their pork dish. Christian and Christine were named team captains for the next challenge for having the best dishes. Derrick, Ben, Adrien, and Tracy were judged to have done enough to move on.; Winners: Christian Collins and Christine Corley; Bottom three: Alejandra Schrader, Jennifer Behm and Suzy Singh; Eliminated: Alejandra Schrader
27	14	"Top 8 Compete"	August 1, 2011	n/a
Team Challenge: The teams must cater for a children's party. The Red team consists of Christine, Ben, Suzy, and Tracy. The Blue team consists of Christian, Adrien, Jennifer, and Derrick. Their menus had to contain a slider and a side dish without using beef or potatoes. The Red Team received the most votes.; Team Challenger Winners/Immune: Ben Starr, Christine Corley, Suzy Singh and Tracy Kontos; Pressure Test: Christian, Jennifer, Derrick and Adrien faced a soufflé challenge, in which they were given 90 minutes to cook their best cheese soufflé. The judges thought every contestant's soufflé was delicious, therefore no one was eliminated.; Eliminated: None
28	15	"Top 8 Compete Again"	August 2, 2011	n/a
Mystery Box Challenge: In a Mystery Box, contestants were to cook a dish with core ingredients of beef and seafood. Adrien, Jennifer and Suzy landed in the top three and it was Jennifer's dish that won.; Challenge Winner: Jennifer Behm; Elimination Test: Jennifer got to pick from the three judges' childhood favorite dishes. She picked Gordon's tomato soup and grilled cheese sandwich, and the contestants had 45 minutes to turn it into a gourmet dish. Suzy and Tracy had the best dishes and earned the title of team captains for the next challenge.; Winners: Suzy Singh and Tracy Kontos; Bottom three: Ben Starr, Christine Corley and Derrick Prince; Eliminated: Christine Corley and Derrick Prince
29	16	"Top 6 Compete"	August 8, 2011	n/a
Team Challenge: The top six were taken to Patina restaurant in Los Angeles, where they had to run a dinner service. Tracy selected Adrien and Jennifer as her Blue Team, and Christian and Ben cooked with Suzy in the Red Team. The Red Team was declared the winner.; Team Challenge Winners/Immune: Ben Starr, Christian Collins and Suzy Singh; Pressure Test: Tracy, Jennifer and Adrien faced off in a Pressure Test with a salmon theme. They were to correctly fillet a whole salmon and cut it into at least ten portions. They then had to cook one portion and serve it to the judges. Jennifer performed best overall.; Bottom two: Adrien Nieto and Tracy Kontos; Eliminated: Tracy Kontos
30	17	"Top 5 Compete"	August 9, 2011	n/a
Mystery Box Challenge: The contestants were given three kinds of ground meat as a core ingredient for a dish of their choosing with other ingredients from the box, which they had to cook within 60 minutes. The top three consisted of Jennifer, Adrien and Ben, with Ben's emerging triumphant.; Challenge Winner: Ben Starr; Elimination Test: Ben got to pick one of Gordon Ramsay's signature dishes for everyone to cook. He also got to ask Gordon three questions about the recipe, with no recipe given to the other contestants. Suzy's dish was deemed the overall best.; Winner: Suzy Singh; Bottom two: Adrien Nieto and Ben Starr; Eliminated: Ben Starr
31	18	"Top 4 Compete"	August 15, 2011	n/a
Team Challenge: The top four were divided in two teams and cooked a dish for the judges, who were joined by 3 judges from international versions of MasterChef. Suzy was allowed to pick which of the other three chefs she wanted to work with, and chose Christian for her Red Team. Jennifer and Adrien's dish earned the Blue Team the win for this challenge.; Team Challenge Winners/Immune: Adrien Nieto and Jennifer Behm; Pressure Test: Suzy and Christian went head-to-head and were given 90 minutes to recreate a lemon meringue pie.; Eliminated: Suzy Singh
32	19	"Top 3 Compete"	August 16, 2011	n/a
Mystery Box Challenge: The final three chefs were asked to cook a dish using chicken in one hour. Adrien won the challenge.; Challenge Winner: Adrien Nieto; Elimination Test: Adrien, Jennifer and Christian were shown ingredients that were three of Joe's favorites. Adrien got to choose his ingredient and chose the octopus. Christian then got the chance to choose both his and Jennifer's ingredient for their entrees. Christian chose veal leaving Jennifer with mushrooms. Adrien was the winner.; Winner: Adrien Nieto; Bottom two: Christian Collins and Jennifer Behm; Eliminated: Christian Collins
33	20	"Winner Revealed"	August 16, 2011	n/a
Season Final: Adrien and Jennifer faced off in a single challenge to determine who wins the title of MasterChef and $250,000. They were given two hours to create a three-course menu of their choosing.; Starter: Jennifer's starter was Pan Seared Scallops with Quail Egg, Creamed Corn and Pea Puree. Adrien's dish was Spot Prawn Taquitos with Avocado Sauce, Masago and Micro Greens; Entree: Jennifer's entree was Stuffed Quail with Creamy Potatoes and Spinach, and Adrien's was Beer Braised Short Ribs with Cauliflower-Parsnip Puree and Rainbow Chard.; Dessert: Jennifer's dish was Braised Pear with Poached Apples and Mascarpone, and Adrien's was Flourless Chocolate Cake Infused with Blood Orange, Passion Fruit and Chipotle.; Final Two: Adrien Nieto and Jennifer Behm; Jennifer was pronounced the winner of the competition, taking away $250,000 and the MasterChef title.; MasterChef Winner: Jennifer Behm
