= Luca Manfè =

Italian-American chef

Luca Manfè (born May 31, 1981 in Aviano, Pordenone, Italy) is a chef perhaps best known for being the winner of season four of the United States edition of MasterChef, the culinary competition television program on which the judges were Gordon Ramsay, Graham Elliot, and Joe Bastianich. He was the first (then) non-American to win the United States MasterChef competition. Later in 2013 in a relatively short time after his television reality competition program victory, he became a naturalized U.S. citizen. He is considered one of the most popular U.S. MasterChef winners of all time.

Following his MasterChef victory, he operated a food truck called "Lucky Fig" in Houston, Texas which he closed in 2017. He remains the owner and operator of the catering company Dinner with Luca.

In 2024, Manfè opened an Italian eatery/sandwich shop/butcher shop originally named Mangia Carne with a Lehigh Valley butcher, Mark Citera, but later took total ownership. He then rebranded the eatery as Luca & Sons.

Manfè has also conducted virtual cooking classes for the U.S. Air Force.
