= MasterChef (American TV series) =

American competitive reality television series

- Genre: Reality competition; Cookery
- Created by: Franc Roddam
- Developed by: Gordon Ramsay; Adeline Ramage Rooney; Pat Llewellyn; Ben Adler; Howard T. Owens; Robin Ashbrook
- Directed by: Brian Smith (2010–2018); Rich Kim (2019–2024); Richard "Butch" Franc (2025); Harbinder Singh (2026)
- Judges: Gordon Ramsay; Graham Elliot; Joe Bastianich; Christina Tosi; Aarón Sánchez; Tiffany Derry
- Country of origin: United States
- Original language: English
- No. of seasons: 16
- No. of episodes: 322

Production
- Executive producers: Elisabeth Murdoch; Natalka Znak; Danny Schrader; Gordon Ramsay; Pat Llewellyn; Ben Adler; Sharon Levy; DJ Nurre; Shyam Balsé
- Producers: Justin Brooks; Jefferson Strouse
- Running time: 42 minutes
- Production companies: One Potato Two Potato; Reveille Productions (2010–2012); Shine America (2012–2014); Endemol Shine North America (2015–present)

Original release
- Network: Fox
- Release: July 27, 2010 – present

Related
- MasterChef Junior

MasterChef is an American competitive cooking reality television series that premiered on Fox on July 27, 2010. Based on the British series of the same name and produced by Endemol Shine North America and One Potato Two Potato, the series features amateur and home chefs competing to win the title of MasterChef. As of the show's fifteenth season, the line-up of judges consists of Gordon Ramsay, Joe Bastianich, and Tiffany Derry.

In October 2025, the series was renewed for a sixteenth and seventeenth season, with judges Ramsay, Bastianich, and Derry all returning. The sixteenth season, subtitled Global Gauntlet, aired April–September 2026.

== Format ==
MasterChef is based on the British BBC series MasterChef. The competition usually takes place in the MasterChef soundstage located in Los Angeles which includes a large kitchen area with several cooking stations which is overlooked by a balcony, a well-stocked pantry, a freezer/fridge area and a fine-dining restaurant/seating dining area room used for certain challenges.

While the particular format of the season has slightly varied over the years, the following challenges have all been regularly featured:

- Skills Test: Cooks are challenged to perform a list of common cooking techniques or styles, or to replicate a particular cooking method of a dish (e.g. steaks done to an exact wellness). This type of test is also sometimes used as an Elimination Test.
- Mystery Box: Cooks are all given a box with the same ingredients and must use only those ingredients to create a dish within a fixed amount of time. The judges will select three dishes based on visual appearance and technique alone to taste, and from these three select one winner who usually gains an advantage of some type.
- Elimination Test: After the challenge is explained, judges evaluate all dishes based on taste and visual appeal. The judges nominate the worst dishes for elimination and criticize them before eliminating at least one contestant.
- Team Challenge: The cooks are split into teams by either team captains or the judges. They often occur in a restaurant takeover or pop-up restaurant taking the place of the staff of a particular restaurant. Diners taste both meals and vote for their favorite. The winning team advances, while the losing team will participate in the Pressure Test or face elimination based on the teams' performance.
- Pressure Test: Another form of the Elimination Test, in which losing team members compete against each other to make a standard dish within a very limited amount of time that requires a great degree of cooking finesse. Each dish is judged on taste, visual appeal and technique, and the losing chef is eliminated.

Once the competition is reduced to either the final two or three competitors, the finalists will compete against each other in a three-course cook-off. All courses of the meal are judged and an overall winner is crowned. The winner of each season wins $250,000, a MasterChef trophy, and the title of MasterChef. Some seasons have also added other prizes such as a cookbook deal.

== Judges ==
Season	Judge 1	Judge 2	Judge 3
1	Gordon Ramsay	Graham Elliot	Joe Bastianich
2	Gordon Ramsay	Graham Elliot	Joe Bastianich
3	Gordon Ramsay	Graham Elliot	Joe Bastianich
4	Gordon Ramsay	Graham Elliot	Joe Bastianich
5	Gordon Ramsay	Graham Elliot	Joe Bastianich
6	Gordon Ramsay	Graham Elliot	Christina Tosi
7	Gordon Ramsay	Guest judges (Note: The guest judges rotated between Sánchez, Wolfgang Puck, Edward Lee, Kevin Sbraga, Richard Blais, and Daniel Boulud)	Christina Tosi
8	Gordon Ramsay	Aarón Sánchez	Christina Tosi
9	Gordon Ramsay	Aarón Sánchez	Joe Bastianich
10	Gordon Ramsay	Aarón Sánchez	Joe Bastianich
11	Gordon Ramsay	Aarón Sánchez	Joe Bastianich
12	Gordon Ramsay	Aarón Sánchez	Joe Bastianich
13	Gordon Ramsay	Aarón Sánchez	Joe Bastianich
14	Gordon Ramsay	Aarón Sánchez	Joe Bastianich
15	Gordon Ramsay	Tiffany Derry	Joe Bastianich
16	Gordon Ramsay	Tiffany Derry	Joe Bastianich

Notes

For the first five seasons, the series starred celebrity chefs Gordon Ramsay (the co-creator of the series and Hell's Kitchen), Graham Elliot and restaurateur Joe Bastianich. From seasons six through eight, pastry chef Christina Tosi temporarily replaced Bastianich. In season seven, Elliot departed as a judge, and in place of a third judge, there were a series of guest judges, one of which was Aarón Sánchez. From seasons eight to fourteen, Sánchez was a regular judge. In season nine, Bastianich returned as a regular judge, replacing Tosi. In season fifteen, Tiffany Derry joined as a regular judge, replacing Sánchez.

== Series overview ==
Season	Contestants	Episodes	Originally released		Winner(s)	Runner(s)-up
Season	Contestants	Episodes	First released	Last released	Winner(s)	Runner(s)-up
1	14	13	July 27, 2010	September 15, 2010	Whitney Miller	David Miller
2	18	20	June 6, 2011	August 16, 2011	Jennifer Behm	Adrien Nieto
3	18	20	June 4, 2012	September 10, 2012	Christine Hà	Josh Marks
4	19	25	May 22, 2013	September 11, 2013	Luca Manfè	Natasha Crnjac
5	22	19	May 26, 2014	September 15, 2014	Courtney Lapresi	Elizabeth Cauvel
6	22	20	May 20, 2015	September 16, 2015	Claudia Sandoval	Derrick Peltz
7	20	19	June 1, 2016	September 14, 2016	Shaun O'Neale	Brandi Mudd & David Williams
8	20	21	May 31, 2017	September 20, 2017	Dino Angelo Luciano	Eboni Henry & Jason Wang
9	24	23	May 30, 2018	September 19, 2018	Gerron Hurt	Ashley Mincey & Cesar Cano
10	20	25	May 29, 2019	September 18, 2019	Dorian Hunter	Sarah Faherty
11	15	18	June 2, 2021	September 15, 2021	Kelsey Murphy	Autumn Moretti & Suu Khin
12	20	20	May 25, 2022	September 14, 2022	Dara Yu	Christian Green & Michael Silverstein
13	20	20	May 24, 2023	September 20, 2023	Grant Gillon	Jennifer Maune & Kennedy Underwood
14	20	19	May 29, 2024	September 18, 2024	Michael Leonard	Becca Gibb & Kamay Lafalaise
15	12 pairs (24 total)	18	May 21, 2025	September 17, 2025	Jessica Bosworth & Jesse Rosenwald	Rachel Sanchez & Julio Figueredo and Tina Duong & Aivan Tran
16	20	18	April 15, 2026	September 16, 2026	Jake Kelley	Heidi Muston & Peter Egede

=== Specials ===
Note: Bold indicates the winner(s) of the challenge.

MasterChef Celebrity Showdown (aired January 18, 2016)

- **Ta'Rhonda Jones** vs Kaitlin Doubleday from Empire (Mystery Box Challenge)
- **Boris Kodjoe and Nicole Ari Parker** vs Terry Crews and Rebecca Crews (Cupcake Tag Team Challenge)
- **Gigi Hadid** vs Devon Windsor (Supermodel Signature Dish Face-off)
- **Christine Hà, Luca Manfé, and Claudia Sandoval** vs Addison Osta Smith, Zac Kara, and Amaya Baéz (Champions vs Juniors)

MasterChef Celebrity Showdown (aired January 2, 2017)

- Cheryl Hines vs **Kal Penn** (Mystery Box Challenge)
- **Trai Byers and Grace Gealey** vs NeNe and Gregg Leakes (Tag Team Challenge)
- Ronde Barber and Tiki Barber vs. **Joel Madden and Benji Madden** (Pastry Challenge)
- Anthony Anderson and Chef Gordon Ramsay vs. **Jordana Brewster and Chef Christina Tosi** (Mystery Box Team Challenge)
- Guest judges: Season seven winner Shaun O'Neale and MasterChef Junior season five contestants: Shayne Wells and Justise Mayberry.

MasterChef Celebrity Family Showdown (aired May 15, 2019 and May 22, 2019)

- Johnny Weir and his brother Boz vs. **Tara Lipinski and her husband Todd** (Fish Dish Showdown)
- Lisa Vanderpump and her daughter Pandora vs. **Nicole "Snooki" Polizzi and JWoww** (Blind Taste Test)
- **Tori Spelling and her daughter Stella** vs. Jennie Garth and her daughter Fiona (Home Fridge Swap Challenge)
- Evander Holyfield and his daughter Ebonne vs. **Oscar De La Hoya and his daughter Atiana** (Keeping Up with Gordon Match)

== Broadcast ==
Old logo

Season one aired as a summer series initially on Tuesday nights at 9:00 p.m. ET, debuting on July 27, 2010; it later moved to Wednesday nights at 8:00 p.m. ET on August 18.

On September 7, 2010, MasterChef was renewed for a second season, which started with a two-night premiere on June 6, 2011.

On October 6, 2011, MasterChef was renewed for a third season, which started with a two-night premiere on June 4, 2012, following Hell's Kitchen.

On July 23, 2012, MasterChef was renewed for a fourth season, which premiered on May 22, 2013.

On May 10, 2013, Fox renewed MasterChef for an additional two seasons, which extended the show to at least six seasons.

On July 22, 2015, Fox renewed MasterChef for a seventh season.

On September 19, 2018, the series had been renewed for a tenth season, which premiered on May 29, 2019 with Ramsay, Sánchez, and Bastianich returning as judges.

On August 18, 2021, the series was renewed for a twelfth season, which premiered on May 25, 2022.

On September 14, 2022, Fox renewed the series for a thirteenth season, prior to the airing of the twelfth season's finale later that same day. The season premiered on May 24, 2023.

On August 9, 2023, the series was renewed for a fourteenth season. On March 4, 2024, it was revealed that the fourteenth season, subtitled Generations, would premiere on May 29, 2024.

On May 13, 2024, the series was renewed for a fifteenth season. On April 8, 2025, it was revealed that the fifteenth season, subtitled Dynamic Duos, would feature pairs competing for the first time. Ramsay and Bastianich returned as judges, with new judge, Tiffany Derry, replacing Sánchez. It was later revealed that the season would premiere on May 21, 2025.

On October 9, 2025, it was announced that the series was renewed for a sixteenth and seventeenth season. Judges Ramsay, Bastianich, and Derry are all slated to return. On February 17, 2026, it was announced that the sixteenth season would premiere on April 15, 2026.

== Reception ==
=== Critical ===
The premiere episode received mixed reviews from major newspapers and online review websites, with reviews commenting that it was entertaining, but criticized the emotional aspect. The Los Angeles Times claimed the contestants' back stories were "blown up," which referred to their dramatization. A Reuters reviewer explained the show "manages to be hugely entertaining and involving thanks mainly to the judges’ personalities and the ability of the producers to spot emotionally charged stories." The Globe and Mail said "the contrived sentimentality of it is, frankly, vomitous" referring to the emotion in contestants' reactions.

The program also attracted negative attention in season two when Agence France-Presse journalist Alex Ogle discovered that the producers doctored a crowd scene said to be of "thousands upon thousands lined up" to audition for the program. In post-production, portions of the scene were replicated so as to make the crowd look larger than it actually was, as evidenced by multiple appearances by especially noticeable people in the scene.

In 2018, season three auditionee Jessie Glenn discussed her experiences becoming a contestant, something she was uniquely able to do because it was overlooked that she had never returned the nondisclosure contract which all applicants are required to sign. She revealed what she described as a carefully planned campaign by the show's staff to create emotional reactions for the sake of on-air drama which caused long-term emotional distress for many contestants, a situation she said was common to most American reality television; she called the casting process "sadistic prying" to assess contestants' weaknesses and vulnerabilities and decide how best to pit contestants against one another to "cause friction and distress". Glenn also revealed that One Potato Two Potato, Ramsay's production company, assessed a 15% "management fee" on contestant earnings.

=== Ratings ===
Season	Episodes	Premiered		Ended		TV season	Time slot (ET)	Season averages (Live + SD)	
Season	Episodes	Date	Premiere viewers (millions)	Date	Finale viewers (millions)	TV season	Time slot (ET)	Viewers (millions)	18-49 rating
1	13	July 27, 2010	5.75	September 15, 2010	4.81	2010	Tuesday 9:00 pm (1–3); Wednesday 8:00 pm (4–13)	5.26	2.3
2	20	June 6, 2011	4.40	August 16, 2011	7.12	2011	Monday 9:00 pm	5.27	2.2
2	20	June 6, 2011	4.40	August 16, 2011	7.12	2011	Tuesday 9:00 pm	5.35	2.2
3	20	June 4, 2012	5.10	September 10, 2012	6.52	2012	Monday 9:00 pm	5.84	2.5
3	20	June 4, 2012	5.10	September 10, 2012	6.52	2012	Tuesday 9:00 pm	5.67	2.4
4	25	May 22, 2013	5.30	September 11, 2013	6.31	2013	Wednesday 8:00 pm	5.63	2.3
5	19	May 26, 2014	4.26	September 15, 2014	5.56	2014	Monday 8:00 pm	5.43	1.9
6	20	May 20, 2015	3.39	September 16, 2015	4.69	2015	Wednesday 8:00 pm	4.56	1.5
7	19	June 1, 2016	3.81	September 14, 2016	4.36	2016	Wednesday 8:00 pm	4.03	1.3
8	21	May 31, 2017	3.67	September 20, 2017	4.14	2017	Wednesday 8:00 pm	3.62	1.1
9	23	May 30, 2018	3.52	September 19, 2018	3.56	2018	Wednesday 8:00 pm	3.52	1.0
10	25	May 29, 2019	3.14	September 18, 2019	3.17	2019	Wednesday 8:00 pm (1-4, 6, 8, 10, 12, 14, 16, 18, 20–25); Thursday 8:00 pm (5, 7, 9, 11, 13, 15, 17, 19)	3.06	0.8
11	18	June 2, 2021	2.55	September 15, 2021	2.53	2021	Wednesday 8:00 pm	2.51	0.6
12	20	May 25, 2022	1.75	September 14, 2022	2.53	2022	Wednesday 8:00 pm	2.22	0.4
13	20	May 24, 2023	1.63	September 20, 2023	2.44	2023	Wednesday 8:00 pm	TBA	TBA
14	19	May 29, 2024	1.81	September 18, 2024	1.68	2024	Wednesday 8:00 pm	TBA	TBA
15	18	May 21, 2025	1.31	September 17, 2025	1.55	2025	Wednesday 8:00 pm	TBA	TBA

== Earlier American adaptation ==
West 175 Productions produced an earlier American adaptation, MasterChef USA, broadcast on PBS from 2000 to 2001. The series format was based directly on BBC's MasterChef and lasted 28 episodes over two seasons. It was hosted by British chef Gary Rhodes, who hosted the British version of MasterChef in 2001.

== Kitchenware ==
In 2011, Reveille Productions and Shine TV, announced licensing deals with kitchenware manufacturers The Cookware Company, Triple Loop Housewares, Global Knives, and Kidsline to produce MasterChef-branded cookware, including stainless steel pans, knives, kitchen appliances, and children's cooking sets. The branded products were given to contestants on the television show to use during challenges. The show changed its branding in 2013 to reflect its expanded focus on consumer products in addition to the television shows. In 2018, Shine America hired Brand Central as their licensing agency, and more branded products, including barbecue tools from Unibrands and children's cooking sets from Wicked Cool Toys, were announced.

== See also ==
- MasterChef Junior
