= MasterChef (American TV series) season 4 =

Season of television series

MasterChef
- Season 4
- Promotional poster for season 4, featuring (T to B) Graham Elliot, Gordon Ramsay, and Joe Bastianich.
- Judges: Joe Bastianich; Graham Elliot; Gordon Ramsay
- No. of contestants: 19
- Winner: Luca Manfè
- Runner-up: Natasha Crnjac
- No. of episodes: 25

Release
- Original network: Fox
- Original release: May 22 – September 11, 2013

Season chronology
- ← Previous; Season 3 Next → Season 5

The fourth season of the American competitive reality television series MasterChef premiered on Fox on May 22, 2013, and concluded on September 11, 2013.

Luca Manfè was the winner of this season, making him the first previous season returnee to win MasterChef after failing to qualify in the audition round in season 3. Natasha Crnjac was the runner-up.

== Top 19 ==
Contestant	Age	Hometown	Occupation	Status
Luca Manfè	31	Astoria, New York	Restaurant Manager	Winner September 11
Natasha Crnjac	26	San Diego, California	Stay-at-Home Mom	Runner-Up September 11
Jessie Lysiak	27	Social Circle, Georgia	Yacht Stewardess	Eliminated September 4
Krissi Biasiello	34	Philadelphia, Pennsylvania	Paralegal	Eliminated September 4
James Nelson	26	Victoria, Texas	Retail Sales	Eliminated August 28
Bri Kozior	22	Doylestown, Pennsylvania	Theater Assistant	Eliminated August 21; Returned August 7 Eliminated July 24
Jordan Roots	29	Minneapolis, Minnesota	Delivery Driver	Eliminated August 14
Eddie Jackson	32	Americus, Georgia	Personal Trainer/Former Pro Football Player	Eliminated July 31
Bethy Rossos	28	Estacada, Oregon	High School P.E. Teacher	Eliminated July 17
Savannah Sturges	27	San Diego, California	Middle School Special Ed. Teacher	Eliminated July 10
Lynn Chyi	27	San Diego, California	Systems Administrator	Eliminated July 10
Jonny Blanchard	28	Marlboro, Massachusetts	Carpenter	Eliminated June 26
Beth Kirby	29	Chattanooga, Tennessee	Writer, Photographer	Eliminated June 26
Bime Cruz	35	Taunton, Massachusetts	Boxing Coach	Eliminated June 19
Howard Simpson	26	San Diego, California	Barback	Eliminated June 19
Kathy Prieto	29	Bronx, New York	Office Assistant	Eliminated June 12
Malcolm Green	27	Cambridge, Massachusetts	Unemployed	Eliminated June 5
Adriana Guillen	26	New York, New York	College Admissions Rep.	Eliminated June 5
Sasha Foxx	42	Tuscaloosa, Alabama	Singer	Eliminated May 29

== Elimination table ==
Place	Contestant	Episode																																
Place	Contestant	4		5	6		7	8	9		10	11		12	13		14	15		16	17		18	19		20	21		22		23	24		25
1	Luca	IN	IN	WIN	WIN	IMM	LOW	PT	IN	IN	WIN	IN	LOW	NPT	IN	IN	PT	IN	IN	WIN	WIN	IMM	IMM	HIGH	IN	WIN	HIGH	WIN	WIN	IMM	WIN	LOW	IN	WINNER
2	Natasha	WIN	IMM	WIN	IN	IN	LOW	WIN	IN	IN	NPT	IN	WIN	WIN	IN	IN	WIN	HIGH	WIN	WIN	HIGH	WIN	IMM	IN	WIN	WIN	IN	IN	IN	PT	WIN	LOW	WIN	RUNNER-UP
3	Jessie	IN	WIN	WIN	IN	LOW	WIN	IMM	IN	WIN	WIN	HIGH	IN	NPT	IN	WIN	WIN	IN	IN	LOW	HIGH	LOW	IMM	IN	LOW	WIN	HIGH	HIGH	WIN	IMM	PT	WIN	ELIM	
4	Krissi	HIGH	IN	PT	IN	IN	PT	IMM	IN	WIN	NPT	IN	LOW	IMM	IN	LOW	PT	HIGH	IN	NPT	IN	WIN	IMM	WIN	IMM	LOW	IN	IN	IN	PT	ELIM			
5	James	IN	IN	NPT	HIGH	IN	WIN	IMM	IN	IN	LOW	IN	WIN	NPT	IN	LOW	WIN	IN	LOW	WIN	IN	IN	IMM	IN	IN	PT	WIN	IMM	IN	ELIM				
6	Bri	IN	IN	WIN	IN	IN	PT	IMM	IN	IN	WIN	IN	IN	IMM	WIN	IMM	LOW	IN	WIN	ELIM			RET	IN	WIN	ELIM								
7	Jordan	IN	WIN	NPT	IN	IN	NPT	IMM	HIGH	IN	PT	IN	IN	WIN	IN	IN	NPT	IN	LOW	PT	IN	IN	IMM	HIGH	ELIM									
8	Eddie	IN	IN	PT	IN	IN	WIN	IMM	WIN	IMM	WIN	IN	IN	WIN	HIGH	IN	WIN	WIN	IMM	WIN	IN	ELIM												
9	Bethy	IN	IN	WIN	IN	WIN	WIN	IMM	IN	IN	LOW	IN	IN	WIN	IN	IN	WIN	IN	ELIM															
10	Savannah	IN	IMM	LOW	IN	IN	WIN	IMM	IN	IN	WIN	IN	IN	WIN	HIGH	IN	ELIM																	
11	Lynn	IN	IN	WIN	IN	IN	WIN	IMM	IN	LOW	WIN	WIN	IMM	PT	IN	ELIM																		
12	Jonny	IN	IN	LOW	IN	IN	WIN	IMM	IN	LOW	NPT	HIGH	IN	ELIM																				
13	Beth	IN	IN	WIN	HIGH	IN	LOW	WIN	IN	LOW	WIN	IN	ELIM																					
14	Bime	HIGH	IN	WIN	IN	WIN	NPT	IMM	HIGH	IN	ELIM																							
15	Howard	IN	LOW	NPT	LOW	IN	WIN	IMM	IN	ELIM																								
16	Kathy	IN	IN	PT	IN	LOW	LOW	ELIM																										
17	Malcolm	IN	LOW	WIN	IN	ELIM																												
18	Adriana	IN	IN	ELIM																														
19	Sasha	IN	ELIM																															

(WINNER) This cook won the competition.
(RUNNER-UP) This cook finished in second place.
(WIN) The cook won an individual challenge (Mystery Box Challenge or Elimination Test).
(WIN) The cook was on the winning team in the Team Challenge and directly advanced to the next round.
(HIGH) The cook was one of the top entries in the individual challenge but didn't win.
(IN) The cook wasn't selected as a top or bottom entry in an individual challenge.
(IN) The cook wasn't selected as a top or bottom entry in a team challenge.
(IMM) The cook didn't have to compete in that round of the competition.
(IMM) The cook was selected by Mystery Box Challenge winner and didn't have to compete in the Elimination Test.
(PT) The cook was on the losing team in the Team Challenge and competed in the Pressure Test, and advanced.
(NPT) The cook was on the losing team in the Team Challenge, did not compete in the Pressure Test, and advanced.
(RET) The cook won the Reinstation Challenge and returned to the competition.
(LOW) The cook was one of the bottom entries in an individual challenge or Pressure Test, but advanced.
(LOW) The cook was one of the bottom entries in the Team Challenge, but advanced.
(ELIM) The cook was eliminated from MasterChef.

=== Guest judges ===
- Lidia Bastianich - Episode 9
- Christine Hà - Episode 11
- Eva Longoria - Episode 13
- Paula Deen - Episode 22

== Episodes ==
No. overall	No. in season	Title	Original release date	U.S. viewers (millions)
54	1	"Auditions #1"	May 22, 2013	n/a
Day 1 of Auditions: The cooks who earn white aprons today include Natasha, Brian, Jordan, Adriana, and Krissi. Natasha, Bethy, Lynn, Jordan, and Krissi get all three yeses, while Adriana and Brian get two. Christine and George failed to progress.
55	2	"Auditions #2"	May 22, 2013	n/a
Day 2 of Auditions: The white aprons that were handed out today belong to Jessie, Sasha, Bime, James, Eddie, and Luca. Sasha gets three yeses, while Bime, James, Eddie and Luca get two. Jessie only got one yes, but won an apron after winning a fish-filleting challenge proposed by Gordon.
56	3	"Top 19 Revealed"	May 29, 2013	n/a
Audition 3 and Boot Camp: Howard and Jonny gain white aprons.; The remaining contestants are asked to prepare a meal in an hour using various cuts of lamb. With fifteen minutes left, Joe takes off some aprons due to many mistakes (Brian, James Dudd, and Gabriella). At the end of time, all but eight contestants are divided into two groups. One group is eliminated while the other group consisting of Adriana, Bethy, Bime, Eddie, Howard, James, Jessie, Jordan, Kathy, Krissi, Lynn, Natasha, Sasha and Savannah advance straight to the MasterChef kitchen. The remaining eight contestants will have their dishes tasted to decide who is advancing into the next stage. Malcolm and Seymira was the first pair called forward. Malcolm advanced over Seymira. The next pair to face the judges is Brian and Jonny. The judges advanced Jonny and sent Brian home. Nanci and Bri were up next. Bri was advanced by the judges. Lastly, the pair remaining is Beth and Luca. Gordon then announced that Beth will be the next home cook to advance, however, Gordon declared that Luca will also be going into the MasterChef kitchen, bringing the total of competitors to 19.
57	4	"Top 19 Compete"	May 29, 2013	n/a
Mystery Box Challenge: The mystery box for this episode challenges the contestants to create a meal using simple ingredients. The top three dishes were Bime's, Natasha's, and Krissi's. Natasha emerges as the winner.; Challenge Winner/Immune: Natasha Crnjac; Elimination Test: The elimination test was to test how the contestants treat some of the world's most expensive, high-end ingredients. Natasha was given immunity from elimination, and she was given the advantage of picking the difficult ingredient with which her fellow competitors will have to cook, she picked langoustine. Her third advantage was that she could pick one other contestant to be safe from elimination. Natasha picked Savannah.; Immune: Savannah Sturges; Gordon announced that both Jordan and Jessie had the best dishes of this elimination challenge, and would become team captains in the first team challenge. Krissi, Lynn, Luca, and Kathy were judged to have done enough to move on.; Winners: Jessie Lysiak and Jordan Roots; Bottom three: Howard Simpson, Sasha Foxx and Malcolm Green; Eliminated: Sasha Foxx
58	5	"Top 18 Compete"	June 5, 2013	n/a
Team Challenge: For this team challenge, the contestants must feed over three hundred students at Emperor Elementary School. As Jessie and Jordan produced the best meals in the last test, they become team captains for this challenge. On her Red Team, Jessie picks Lynn, Bethy, Beth, Bime, Natasha, Bri, Luca and Malcolm. For the Blue Team, Jordan picks Savannah, James, Eddie, Jonny, Krissi, Adriana, Howard and Kathy. Each team is assigned to create a two-dish healthy meal. In the end, the Red Team scores 58% of the votes, making them the winners of the season's first team challenge.; Team Challenge Winners/Immune: Beth Kirby, Bethy Rossos, Bime Cruz, Bri Kozior, Jessie Lysiak, Luca Manfe, Lynn Chyi, Malcolm Green and Natasha Crnjac; Pressure Test: The Blue Team have to face the pressure test. This week, the judges test the contestants' baking abilities by having them create a delicious cheesecake in 1½ hours. Gordon reveals to Jordan that he could excuse any three of his team members, including himself, from the pressure test. Jordan saves Howard, James and himself.; Immune: Howard Simpson, James Nelson and Jordan Roots; Bottom three: Adriana Guillen, Jonny Blanchard and Savannah Sturges; Eliminated: Adriana Guillen
59	6	"Top 17 Compete"	June 5, 2013	n/a
Mystery Box Challenge: The judges reveal that they'd be cooking alongside Gordon Ramsay himself. The Mystery Box includes such typical Japanese ingredients. The top three dishes were James's, Beth's, and Luca's. The judges decided that Luca is the winner of this week's mystery box.; Challenge Winner/Immune: Luca Manfe; Elimination Test: Luca became safe from elimination and was given the option of choosing a classic American dessert for his competitors to make. Luca chose cupcakes, and after returning to the kitchen, he received another advantage: he was allowed to take away the mixer of one contestant, forcing that person to mix all ingredients by hand. He removed Jordan's mixer. The contestants were given 90 minutes to produce a box of twelve cupcakes. Bethy and Bime were deemed to have the best dishes and were made team captains in the next episode. Howard and Jordan were also judged to have good enough cupcakes to move on.; Winners: Bethy Rossos and Bime Cruz; Bottom three: Jessie Lysiak, Kathy Prieto and Malcolm Green; Eliminated: Malcolm Green
60	7	"Top 16 Compete, Part 1"	June 12, 2013	n/a
Team Challenge: Bethy and Bime are chosen to be team captains of this week's team challenge. This week's challenge for the teams is to prepare 101 New York strip steaks with a sauce and two sides of fresh produce for firemen. Bethy's Blue Team originally consists of Lynn, Jessie, James, Howard, Jonny, Savannah and Krissi; while Bime's Red Team has Jordan, Eddie, Luca, Natasha, Bri, Beth and Kathy. However, Bethy is given the opportunity to steal one of Bime's team members and give him one of her original picks. She steals Eddie and she relinquishes Krissi to Bime. The Blue gains 68 votes out of the 101 firemen, ensuring them safety from the pressure test.; Team Challenge Winners/Immune: Bethy Rossos, Eddie Jackson, Howard Simpson, James Nelson, Jessie Lysiak, Jonny Blanchard, Lynn Chyi and Savannah Sturges; Pressure Test: The Red Team must face the pressure test. This week, the judges test their ability to pull off a classic breakfast meal - eggs benedict. Since Bime was the team captain, the judges excuse him from participation. Bime is also allowed to excuse another team member, he picks Jordan.; Immune: Bime Cruz and Jordan Roots; Bottom four: Beth Kirby, Kathy Prieto, Luca Manfe and Natasha Crnjac; Eliminated: None
61	8	"Top 16 Compete, Part 2"	June 12, 2013	n/a
Continued Pressure Test: Las Vegas Round: Luca, Natasha, Kathy and Beth are brought to Las Vegas, Nevada, to compete in yet another pressure test to decide which of them will be sent home. For this pressure test, the contestants cook in Gordon Ramsay's restaurant, BurGR. The two teams are required to create a gourmet burger recipe and prep and cook them for dinner service. Each diner will receive a burger from each team. The teams consist of Beth and Natasha on the Blue Team with Beth as captain, and Luca and Kathy on the Red Team with Luca as captain. The dining judges are revealed to be the remaining contestants who are blind tasting the dishes. The Blue Team receives more votes, winning the second pressure test of the week. Luca and Kathy were left to compete in the last pressure test, a MasterChef cook-off.; Team Challenge Winners/Immune: Beth Kirby and Natasha Crnjac; Pressure Test: The judges bring Luca and Kathy to the top of Caesars Palace to produce a butter-poached lobster with a shaved fennel salad.; Eliminated: Kathy Prieto
62	9	"Top 15 Compete"	June 19, 2013	n/a
Mystery Box Challenge: The a mystery box features various ethnic foods from Russia, Spain, China and several others. In addition, the judges also refrain from telling the home chefs what exactly the ingredients of the mystery box are. The top three meals consist of Eddie's, Jordan's, and Bime's. Eddie's meal is deemed the best and he's given advantages in the next challenge.; Challenge Winner/Immune: Eddie Jackson; Elimination Test: The theme of this week's elimination test is pasta with a filling. Eddie's first advantage is that he is not required to cook and safe from elimination. His second advantage is to pick which of the stuffed pastas his fellow competitors would have to make. Eddie chooses agnolotti. The judges invite Joe's mom, Lidia Bastianich, to provide a live demonstration. Eddie's third advantage is that he can pick two contestants who would be forbidden to watch Lidia's demonstration. He picks Lynn and James for this. The judges awarded Krissi and Jessie with having the best meals, making them team captains in the next team challenge.; Winners: Jessie Lysiak and Krissi Biasiello; Bottom four: Beth Kirby, Howard Simpson, Jonny Blanchard and Lynn Chyi; Eliminated: Howard Simpson
63	10	"Top 14 Compete"	June 19, 2013	n/a
Team Challenge: For this week's team challenge, the contestants cook for the cast and crew of Glee at Paramount Studios with Krissi as the Blue Team captain and Jessie as the Red Team captain. Jane Lynch picked the teams based on "beauty" (Jessie) and the "beast" (Krissi). Jessie's "beauty" Red Team contains Savannah, Bri, Lynn, Beth, Luca and Eddie. Krissi's "beast" Blue Team is made up of James, Bime, Natasha, Jonny, Bethy and Jordan. They had to make three entrées and sides. The Glee cast members vote for their favorite. The Red Team won 90 of the 127 votes, sending the Blue Team to the pressure test.; Team Challenge Winners/Immune: Beth Kirby, Bri Kozior, Eddie Jackson, Jessie Lysiak, Luca Manfe, Lynn Chyi and Savannah Sturges; Pressure Test: Krissi had the choice to decide which of her teammates she will save, saving at least one person and no more than five people. She saved Jonny, Natasha and herself. The challenge had the contestants make a lemonless version of lemon meringue pie.; Immune: Jonny Blanchard, Krissi Biasiello and Natasha Crnjac; Bottom three: Bethy Rossos, Bime Cruz and James Nelson; Eliminated: Bime Cruz
64	11	"Top 13 Compete"	June 26, 2013	n/a
Mystery Box Challenge: The contestants lift their boxes to reveal a pig head for their mystery box challenge. The top three dishes were Lynn's, Jessie's, and Jonny's. Lynn was winner of this week's Mystery Box.; Challenge Winner/Immune: Lynn Chyi; Elimination Test: Lynn became in control of the next elimination test. This week, the theme of the elimination test revolved around the favorite ingredients of MasterChef season three winner, Christine Hà. Lynn's first advantage was that he did not have to compete in the challenge and was safe from elimination. Then, the judges presented him with three of Christine's favorite ingredients, and Lynn was able to pick the ingredient that one particular contestant would cook with and also choose one other ingredient that all of the other contestants would cook with. He chose Krissi to make a catfish dish, while the rest of contestants were given a crab as their main component. They were given 60 minutes. The top two dishes belonged to James and Natasha, giving them the roles of team captains in the next team challenge.; Winners: James Nelson and Natasha Crnjac; Bottom three: Beth Kirby, Krissi Biasiello and Luca Manfe; Eliminated: Beth Kirby
65	12	"Top 12 Compete"	June 26, 2013	n/a
Team Challenge: The two teams are in charge of preparing a meal for a wedding. First, the competitors receive a long list from the bride about her dislikes. The teams must produce two stunning entrees that would match the quality of the appetizer and dessert - a non-vegetarian and a vegetarian dish. Blue Team captain James chooses Lynn, Jessie, Jonny, Bri and Luca to be on his team. Red Team captain Natasha chooses Eddie, Jordan, Bethy, Savannah and Krissi to be on her team. Additionally, the judges tell the captains they must choose one person on their team who will not participate in the team challenge. James excuses Bri from the challenge. Natasha opts to excuse Krissi. The Red Team are deemed the winners, leaving the Blue Team to face the pressure test.; Immune: Bri Kozior and Krissi Biasiello; Team Challenge Winners/Immune: Bethy Rossos, Eddie Jackson, Jordan Roots, Natasha Crnjac and Savannah Sturges; Pressure Test: For this week's pressure test, the contestants are tasked with making a box of twelve perfect macarons. However, the team was told that only two of them would compete in the test, and that the judges would determine who would be safe.; Immune: James Nelson, Jessie Lysiak and Luca Manfe; Bottom two: Jonny Blanchard and Lynn Chyi; Eliminated: Jonny Blanchard
66	13	"Top 11 Compete"	July 10, 2013	n/a
Mystery Box Challenge: For this week's challenge, Eva Longoria surprised the contestants with a Mexican-themed mystery box where she handpicked all the ingredients. The top three dishes were Bri's, Eddie's, and Savannah's. The judges and Eva decided that Bri's dish was the best.; Challenge Winner/Immune: Bri Kozior; Elimination Test: Bri received safety from the Elimination Test and was shown two baskets of ingredients. The first basket contained sweet ingredients, and the contestants who received this basket would be given the full 60 minutes to prepare their dish. The second basket contained a variety of savory ingredients, and the contestants who received this basket would only be given 30 minutes to produce a dish. Bri was told that she would have to pick one person who would cook with one basket and the other 9 competitors would cook with the other. She decided give Natasha the savory basket and gave all the other contestants the sweet basket. The judges decided that Jessie's dish was the best and she was made a captain of the next team challenge.; Winner: Jessie Lysiak; Bottom three: James Nelson, Krissi Biasiello and Lynn Chyi; Eliminated: Lynn Chyi
67	14	"Top 10 Compete"	July 10, 2013	n/a
Team Challenge: The contestants were brought to Huntington Beach, California to serve 101 surfers a meal of fish tacos. The contestants were split into two teams and Jessie was given the ability to choose her entire team as well as the other team. She chose to have James, Eddie, Bethy, and Natasha for her Blue Team, then chose Savannah to be the team captain for the Red Team consisting of her, Jordan, Krissi, Luca, and Bri. The Blue Team won the challenge 51 to 25. The Blue Team also won tickets to the 2013 MLB All-Star Game.; Team Challenge Winners/Immune: Bethy Rossos, Eddie Jackson, James Nelson, Jessie Lysiak and Natasha Crnjac; Pressure Test Prior to the test, the Red Team members were told that they could exempt one member. The team agreed to exempt Jordan. In this test, the competitors had 40 minutes to cook chicken breast in three different ways. Krissi was the first to safety. Luca was then also sent to safety, leaving Bri and Savannah as the bottom two.; Immune: Jordan Roots; Bottom two: Bri Kozior and Savannah Sturges; Eliminated: Savannah Sturges
68	15	"Top 9 Compete"	July 17, 2013	n/a
Mystery Box: For this week there are two boxes. A small box at the contestant's stations as well as a large box spanning the length of the front table. Under their personal boxes was a meat grinder/sausage maker and under the large box was a wide variety of proteins. The top three dishes were Natasha's, Eddie's, and Krissi's. The judges declared Eddie the winner.; Challenge Winner/Immune: Eddie Jackson; Elimination Test: Eddie received immunity and was thus safe from elimination. He was given the opportunity to choose between three ingredients which are usually used in judges' restaurants. Eddie chose mushrooms before being informed that half of the home cooks would be cooking with fresh wild mushrooms and the other half would be cooking with canned mushrooms. Eddie assigned the canned mushrooms to Natasha, Jessie, Krissi and Luca, and left the fresh mushrooms for James, Jordan, Bethy and Bri. Bri and Natasha had the best dishes and became team captains for the next challenge.; Winners: Bri Kozior and Natasha Crnjac; Bottom three: Bethy Rossos, James Nelson and Jordan Roots; Eliminated: Bethy Rossos
69	16	"Top 8 Compete"	July 24, 2013	n/a
Team Challenge: Dropped off in the middle of nowhere, the competitors had to prepare a restaurant quality dish with essential ingredients and no kitchen tools, and also had spent the night in the hills. Bri chose James, Eddie and Luca for Red Team, and Natasha picked Jordan, Jessie and Krissi on Blue Team. Gordon stated that Bri and Natasha were forced to switch teams. Bri was able to choose the main ingredient between rabbits and pigeons. She chose the rabbits for her team, leaving Natasha's team with the pigeons. The Red Team was victorious, sending the Blue Team to the Pressure Test.; Team Challenge Winners/Immune: Eddie Jackson, James Nelson, Luca Manfe and Natasha Crnjac; Pressure Test The winning team had the option of exempting one of the members of the losing team from elimination. The Red Team decided to send Krissi to safety. Jessie, Jordan, and Bri are required to create a platter of six perfect chocolate éclairs.; Immune: Krissi Biasiello; Bottom two: Bri Kozior and Jessie Lysiak; Eliminated: Bri Kozior
70	17	"Top 7 Compete"	July 31, 2013	n/a
Mystery Box: The contestants found another huge mystery box where the judges are usually standing. Inside the box was the competitors' loved ones. The theme of this episode's mystery box was a dish that is inspired by their respective loved ones. Natasha's, Jessie's, and Luca's were chosen to be the top three dishes, with Luca's being singled out to be the best.; Challenge Winner/Immune: Luca Manfe; Team Challenge: Luca was safe from elimination and had to pair up the remaining six competitors for the elimination challenge. The format of the challenge was a tag team, with each member of the pairing taking a 15-minute turn to work on a sushi. Luca paired Jessie and Eddie, Jordan and James, and Natasha and Krissi. Natasha and Krissi's platter was declared the winner.; Team Challenge Winners: Krissi Biasiello and Natasha Crnjac; Bottom two: Eddie Jackson and Jessie Lysiak; Eliminated: Eddie Jackson
71	18	"Top 6 Compete"	August 7, 2013	n/a
Elimination Test #1: The judges invited back three previously eliminated competitors to compete for a spot back in the competition. Gordon brought back Bri, Joe invited back Lynn, and Graham picked Bime. The three were charged with cooking as many perfectly cooked sunny-side up eggs as they could in fifteen minutes, with the two cooks with the most perfect eggs facing off in the next challenge. Lynn plated only 8 perfect eggs. Bri, with 13 perfect eggs, passed on to the next challenge, and was then joined by Bime, who cooked 16 perfect ones thus eliminating Lynn.; Elimination Test #2: The remaining contestants and Joe Bastianich would blind taste test dishes to determine which home cook would rejoin them. Bri and Bime were presented with two Alaskan king salmon. The judges told the two cooks to serve up to seven portions of pan-seared salmon with sides within 60 minutes. Bri won four of the seven votes.; Reinstated: Bri Kozior
72	19	"Top 7 Compete"	August 14, 2013	n/a
Mystery Box: This week, the contestants opened their mystery boxes to find a single T-bone steak. The time limit was 45 minutes. The judges chose to taste Jordan's, Luca's, and Krissi's. The judges decided that Krissi would be the winner of this week's mystery box.; Challenge Winner/Immune: Krissi Biasiello; Elimination Test: The theme of the elimination test was poultry. Krissi was safe from elimination and was able to assign one bird to each of the remaining competitors. Krissi gave Natasha the pheasant, Luca the turkey and Jordan the quail, then assigned the duck to James, the chicken to Jessie, and the pigeon to Bri. The contestants were given 60 minutes to produce a dish using their bird. Natasha's and Bri's were the top two dishes of the night, giving them the roles of team captains in the next team challenge.; Winners: Bri Kozior and Natasha Crnjac; Bottom two: Jessie Lysiak and Jordan Roots; Eliminated: Jordan Roots
73	20	"Top 6 Compete"	August 21, 2013	n/a
Team Challenge: Gordon informed the group that their next challenge would involve a dinner service in WP24, a Los Angeles Asian restaurant owned by renowned chef Wolfgang Puck. The contestants were split into two teams: Red Team captain Natasha led Jessie and Luca, while Blue Team captain Bri led James and Krissi. The teams served a limited menu which consisted of two appetizers and two dinner entrées. The next morning, the Red Team was announced as the winner, giving them immunity from the pressure test.; Team Challenge Winners/Immune: Jessie Lysiak, Luca Manfe and Natasha Crnjac; Pressure Test: This pressure test required Bri, Krissi and James to recreate a plate of fried calamari with marinara sauce in 60 minutes. James' calamari was the first to be sent to safety.; Bottom two: Bri Kozior and Krissi Biasiello; Eliminated: Bri Kozior
74	21	"Top 5 Compete, Part 1"	August 28, 2013	n/a
Mystery Box: Gordon, Graham and Joe announced that their sons would choose 15 items for the mystery box. They assembled the box with a lot of sweets, fruit and baking items, leading to all of the competitors to creating desserts. Luca's, Jessie's, and James' were the best creations. James won the Mystery Box challenge.; Challenge Winner/Immune: James Nelson; Elimination Test: The judges awarded immunity to James, and then showed him the best dishes they had ever eaten in their life; James chose Gordon's hủ tiếu dish. The remaining competitors had to taste the dish then grab the correct ingredients from the pantry and recreate it in 75 minutes. Luca's dish was deemed the best dish of the night and won the elimination challenge. The judges then did not eliminate anyone.; Winner: Luca Manfe; Eliminated: None
75	22	"Top 5 Compete, Part 2"	August 28, 2013	n/a
Off-site challenge: The competitors faced each other for two spots in the final four and to save themselves from the Pressure Test. In this challenge, they had to cook for 50 guests with each home cook responsible for serving ten guests each of a special charity lunch hosted in Paula Deen's ranch an entreé composed of a protein and two sides. Luca was able to assign five protein items: he chose pork chops for himself, he gave alligator to Jessie, catfish to Natasha, shrimp to Krissi, and chicken to James. Paula Deen declared Luca and Jessie as the winners of the challenge.; Challenge Winners/Immune: Jessie Lysiak and Luca Manfe; Pressure Test: In this Pressure Test, Luca and Jessie had the advantage of giving to each cook an item to replicate. They assigned Gordon's seared scallop salad to Natasha, Joe's filet rossini to Krissi, and Graham's Greek yogurt panna cotta to James. They had 45 minutes to find out the ingredients and replicate them.; Eliminated: James Nelson
76	23	"Top 4 Compete"	September 4, 2013	n/a
Team Mystery Box challenge: The four remaining competitors were divided into two teams and had two huge boxes with 50 ingredients to make a classic three-course menu with appetizer, entreé and dessert. Luca had the advantage of choosing his partner and the box. He opted for Natasha forming the Blue team, while Jessie and Krissi formed the Red team. The judges declared Luca and Natasha to be the winners and secured their spots in the semifinals, while sending Jessie and Krissi to the season's final pressure test.; Team Challenge Winners/Immune: Luca Manfe and Natasha Crnjac; Pressure Test: Chocolate was the theme of this pressure test. Jessie and Krissi had 75 minutes to create three desserts featuring chocolate. In the end, Joe picked Jessie to join Natasha and Luca in the final three, resulting in Krissi being sent home.; Eliminated: Krissi Biasiello
77	24	"Top 3 Compete"	September 4, 2013	n/a
Mystery Box challenge: For the season's final Mystery Box challenge, the three competitors were each given a box with all the ingredients necessary to recreate and improve the dishes they served in their initial auditions. Jessie's dish was deemed as the best.; Challenge Winner: Jessie Lysiak; Elimination Test: All three contestants were called into the pantry, and three "best of the best" ingredients were shown to them. Jessie chose the Kobe beef, Natasha selected the king crab, this left Luca with the Grana Padano.; Winner: Natasha Crnjac; Bottom two: Jessie Lysiak and Luca Manfe; Eliminated: Jessie Lysiak
78	25	"Winner Chosen"	September 11, 2013	n/a
Season Final: The finalists Luca and Natasha were charged with creating a perfect, cohesive three-course dinner, with one hour of cooking time for each of them.; Appetizer: Natasha prepared pan-seared scallops, seaweed salad, couscous, and a cauliflower puree, while Luca decided on pan-seared duck liver with caramelized peaches, Asian pear chutney, and a toasted French brioche.; Entree: Natasha cooked a five-spice monkfish with rendered caul fat, infused jasmine rice, and coconut curry sauce. Luca opted for tamarind and balsamic-braised beef short ribs with a Sunchoke and truffle puree and sauteed chanterelle mushrooms.; Dessert: Both chose to serve panna cotta. Natasha served up a coconut yogurt panna cotta with passion fruit coulis, accompanied by edible flowers. Luca presented the judges a basil panna cotta with sweet tomato jam, mascarpone, honey cream, and granulated basil.; Final Two: Luca Manfe and Natasha Crnjac; Winner Revealed: The judges declared Luca Manfe the winner of season four. In winning, he became the first previous-season returnee to win the title.; MasterChef Winner: Luca Manfe
