= Graham Elliot =

American chef, restaurateur and TV personality (born 1977)

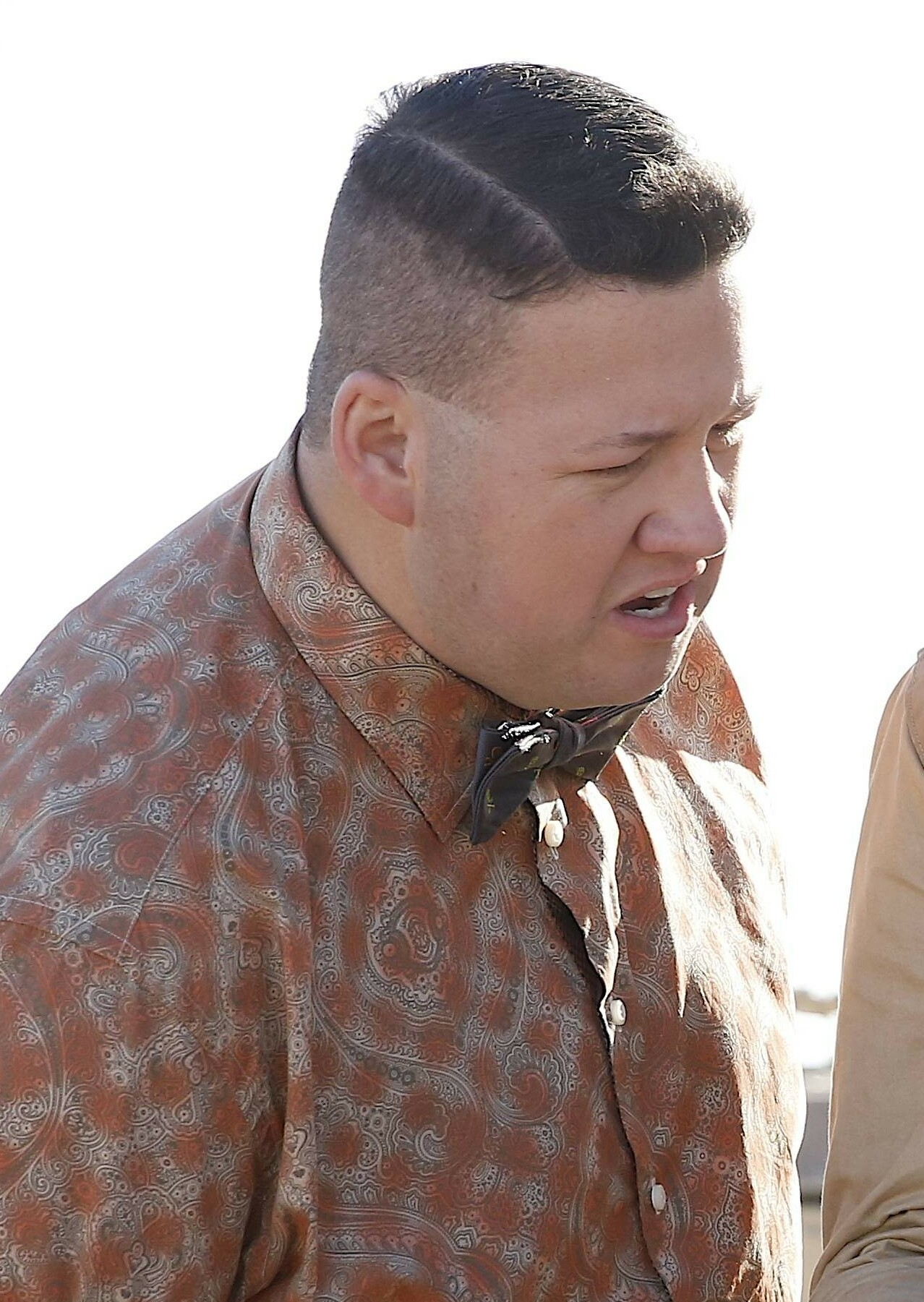
- Elliot in 2014
- Born: Graham Elliot Bowles; January 4, 1977 (age 49); Seattle, Washington, U.S.
- Education: Johnson & Wales University
- Spouse: Allie Bowles (formerly)
- Children: 3
- Culinary career
- Previous restaurants
- Graham Elliot; G. E. B. (Graham Elliot Bistro); Grahamwich
- Television shows
- MasterChef; Junior MasterChef; The Great American Recipe

Graham Elliot Bowles (born January 4, 1977) is an American chef, restaurateur, and reality television personality. He first gained recognition in the restaurant business as a three-time nominee for the James Beard Award. In 2004, he was named to Food & Wine's "Best New Chefs" list and became the youngest chef in the United States to receive four stars from a major publication (Chicago Tribune, Chicago Sun-Times).

Among television viewers, he gained fame as a contestant on the programs Iron Chef and Top Chef Masters, and as a judge on the first six seasons of the American MasterChef and its spinoff, MasterChef Junior.

== Early life ==
Elliot was born on January 4, 1977, in Seattle, Washington. A self-described "Navy brat", Elliot has traveled the world and all fifty states, sparking an intense interest in food and music, which led him to attend Johnson & Wales University.

== Career ==
In 2004, Elliot was named to Food & Wine's "Best New Chefs" list, and he became the youngest chef in the States to receive four stars from a major publication (Chicago Tribune, Chicago Sun-Times) before the age of 30.

At the age of 27, he was the youngest four-star chef to be named in any city, also earning himself a spot on Crain's Chicago Business list of "40 Under Forty", alongside President Barack Obama, for whom Elliot cooked on the President's 49th birthday.

In May 2008, he opened his eponymous restaurant, the first French casual fine-dining restaurant in Chicago.

In 2009, Elliot appeared on the TV show Top Chef Masters. In the show, he cooked for The Heart and Stroke Foundation, a charity with which he became associated as a result of his nephew's need for a heart transplant.

Elliot was known by his full name until July 2010, when it was announced he was changing his name professionally, dropping the usage of Bowles.

In 2010, the series MasterChef premiered, with Elliot as one of the three judges. In 2013, the series spun off a children's version of the program, MasterChef Junior, on which Elliot also featured as a judge. He left the franchise in September 2015, following the completion of season 6 of the parent program.

In 2016, he became a judge on Top Chef.

Elliot appeared as a judge on the first two seasons of The Great American Recipe in 2022 and 2023. In addition to judging dishes in each episode, Elliot also contributed recipes to the show's companion cookbooks.

== Awards and honors ==
Graham Elliot Restaurant received three stars from the Chicago Tribune and two stars in the 2013 Michelin Guide.

He has been nominated for a James Beard Award three times.

== Collaborations and marketing ==
In addition to being a judge and host of MasterChef and MasterChef Junior from 2010 to 2016, Graham has also been a judge on Food Network's Cooks vs. Cons, hosted by Geoffrey Zakarian. He also appeared as a special guest in MasterChef Canada Season 2, Episode 9, and MasterChef Italia Season 3, Episode 9.

He has worked as the Culinary Director at Lollapalooza, a three-day music festival in Chicago, every year since 2009, where he has cooked for both the public and the performers backstage.

In June 2012, he opened Graham Elliot Bistro in Chicago's West Loop. The bistro uses traditional techniques and ingredients to showcase its take on classic American cuisine. That same year, Elliot was named Chef of the Year and inducted into the Chicago Chefs Hall of Fame. Additionally, Chicago Mayor Rahm Emanuel proclaimed September 19 "Graham Elliot Day" in the city of Chicago.

In 2017, Elliot appeared in an infomercial for the Gotham Steel Double Grill.

== Personal life ==
Elliot resides in Fort Worth, TX. He is divorced or separated from his wife, Allie Bowles. They have 3 children.

Elliot sings and plays guitar. He also collects baseball cards.

In 2013, Elliot underwent weight loss surgery and took up jogging, losing 150 pounds (68 kg) and reducing his weight to 250 pounds (110 kg), explaining the decision as a response to becoming a father.
