= Logan Guleff =

MasterChef Junior Season 2 Winner (born 2002)

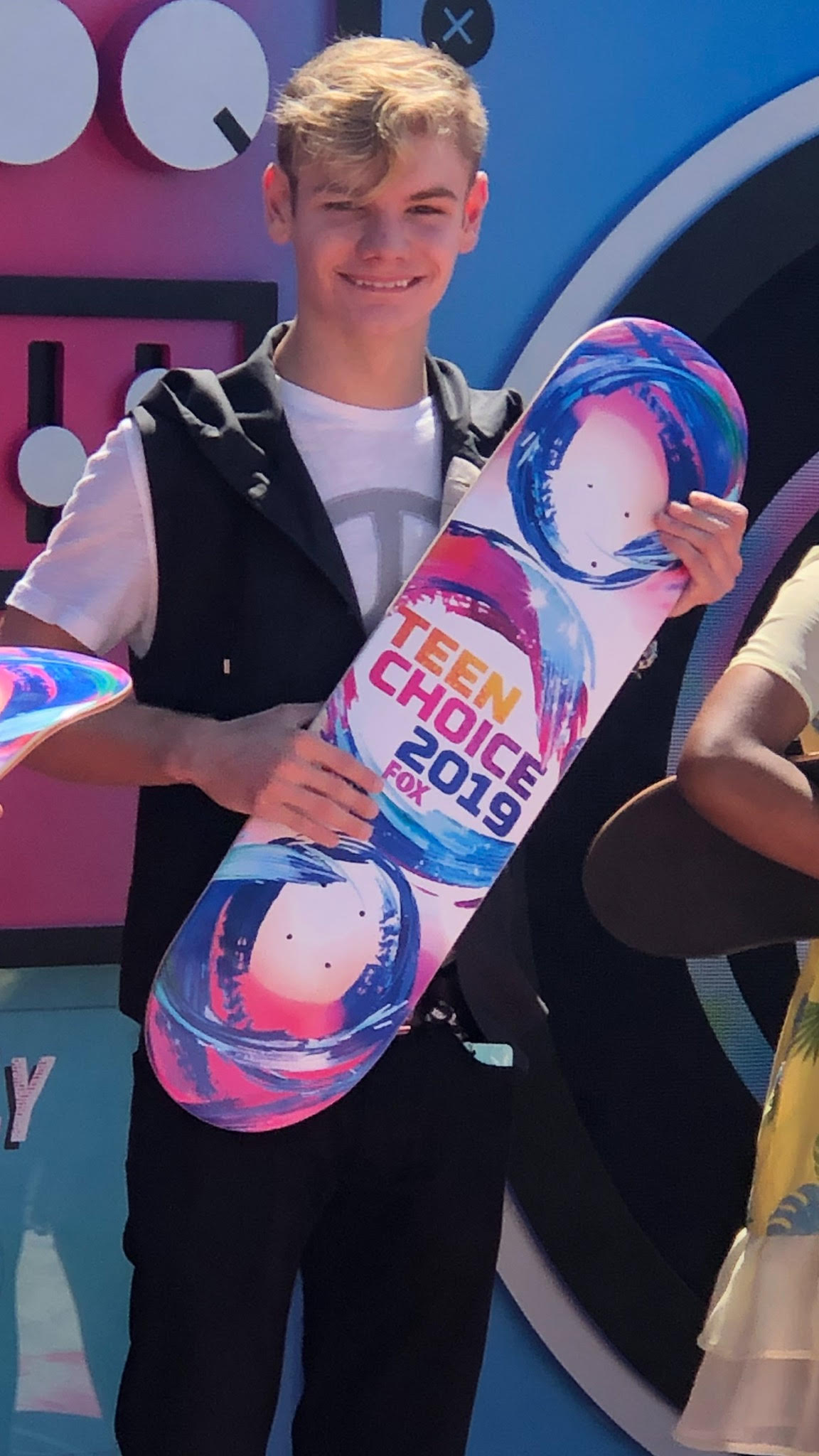
- Guleff at the 2019 Teen Choice Awards
- Born: July 23, 2002 (age 24); Memphis, Tennessee, U.S.
- Occupation: Chef
- Known for: Masterchef Junior
- Style: Southern American, pastry, dessert
- Website: www.loganguleff.com

Logan Guleff (born July 23, 2002) is a television personality, cookbook author, entrepreneur, and owner of Logan's Underground Supper Club. In 2014, he became the winner of the second season of MasterChef Junior. In 2016, Guleff was listed in Time Magazine's "30 Most Influential Teens" as "a rising star in the culinary world". He is a graduate of Pepperdine University in Malibu, CA.

== Early cooking career ==
Guleff started cooking at the age of three. At the age of nine, his recipe for the "Jif Most Creative Sandwich" contest won him an appearance on Today on NBC. "I went on TV a bunch with my recipe and it was really fun. I got so disappointed that I did not win the grand prize, so my Mom suggested that I enter another contest and I won (the Epicurious Healthy Challenge trip)."

== MasterChef Junior ==
On December 16, 2014, Guleff won the second season of MasterChef Junior.

Guleff's winning meal included an appetizer of saffron spot prawns with olive tapenade and smoked aioli, an entree of salt-crusted branzino and a dessert of Meyer lemon madeleines with goat cheese mousse and a berry compote.

He has also appeared on Season 4 (Cupcake Judge), Season 5 (Show Clip) & Season 6 (Guest) of the show.

== Recognition ==
Guleff has won several food competitions, including one which took him to the White House in 2012 to meet the President Barack Obama and the First Lady Michelle Obama at the Epicurious Kid's State Dinner Healthy Lunch Challenge.

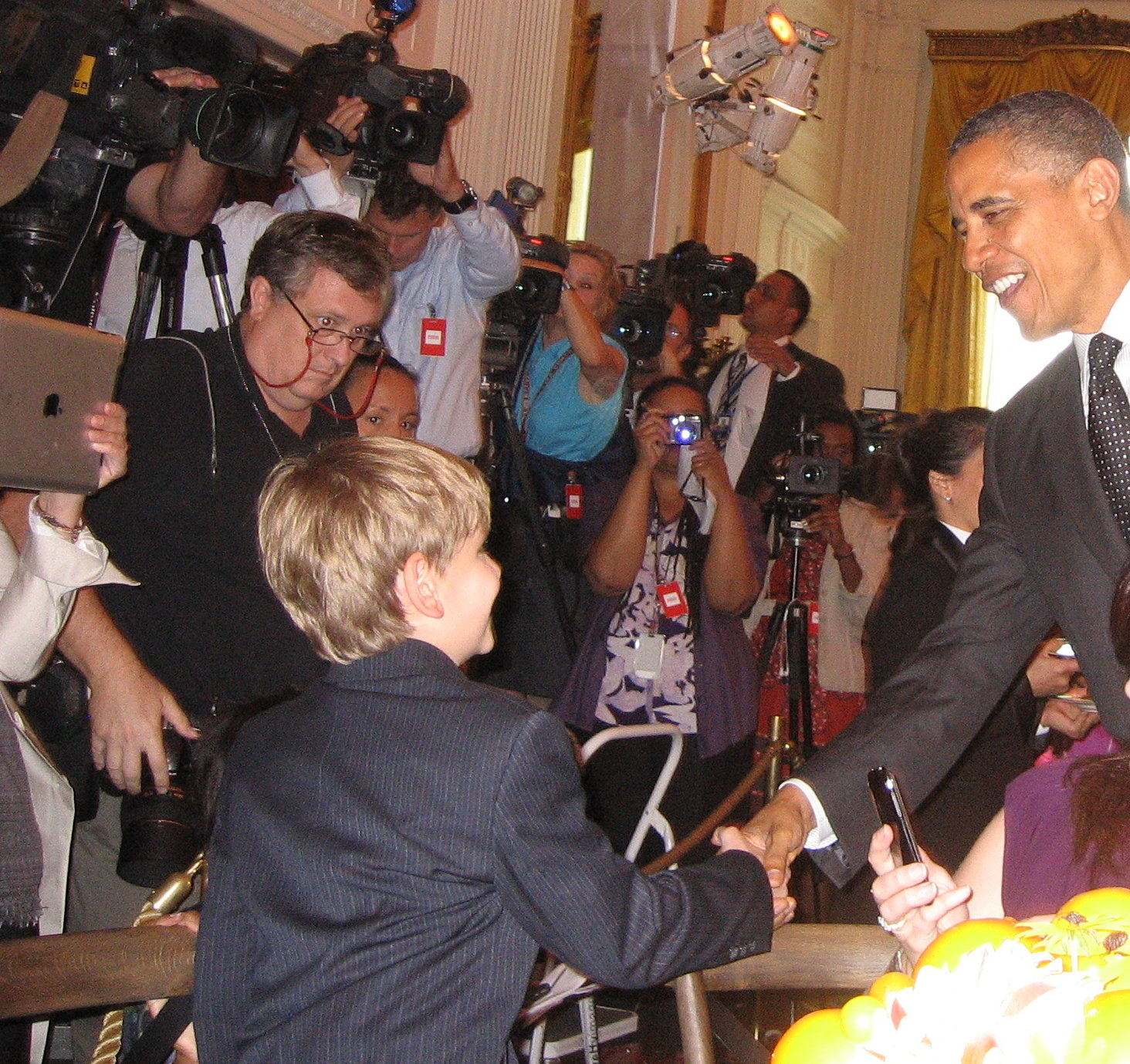
Logan Guleff shaking hands with President Barack Obama in August 2012

In 2013, Guleff became the first and only child judge to complete the training course given by the Memphis World Championship BBQ committee as a certified judge. In 2015, Logan became the youngest certified judge (age 12) at the World Championship Barbecue Cooking Contest. He also judged the International Young Chef Olympiad in India in 2017.

In 2015, Guleff became a finalist in Shorty Awards for recognition in producing real-time short form content in the FOOD category along his social media platforms. At the same year, he was named as a presenter for the Reality Television Awards (Hollywood) along with MasterChef Junior winning best "New Cast".

In the summer of 2015, Guleff became a spokesperson for the "Get Kids Cooking" campaign and initiative, GetKidsCooking.ca (in Canada).

In 2016, Guleff was named the "Next Great Southern Cook in America" by Southern Living Magazine, along with Forbes magazine naming him one of the Young Innovators Who Are Changing the World. Winner of the James Beard Foundation 2016 Blended Burger Project™.

At the age of 14, Guleff inked a partnership deal with the meal delivery kit service Chef'd to present several of his dishes, including his winning James Beard Sustainable Mushroom Monster Burger (2017).

In 2018, Guleff won the Gourmand World Cookbook Award for the Best New Cookbook (US) for "Cooking Dreams", and in May 2018 the book was announced as the winner of "The Best in The World First Cookbook" in Yantai, China. He was selected as a TEDx speaker on the subject of "The Art of The Flavor".

In 2021, Guleff became the first chef to offer an NFT virtual dining experience.

== Television ==
Television
| Year | Show | Role | Notes |
|---|---|---|---|
| 2012 | The Today Show | Himself | Contestant JIF Sandwich |
| 2014 | MasterChef Junior | Himself | Contestant/Winner (Season 2) |
| 2015 | MasterChef Junior | Himself | Cupcake Judge/Judge (Season 4) |
| 2017 | The Today Show | Himself | Guest Chef - James Beard Winning Burger |
| 2017 | MasterChef Junior | Himself | Special Edition Winner Interview (Season 5) |
| 2017 | Galileo | Himself | Youngest Chef in The World |
| 2017 | Pickler & Ben | Himself | Amazing Teens Edition |
| 2018 | MasterChef Junior | Himself | Guest (Season 6) |

== Awards and nominations ==
Awards and nominations for Logan Guleff
| Year | Award | Category |
|---|---|---|
| 2012 | JIF Peanut Butter Sandwich Challenge | National Finalist |
| 2012 | Epicurious - Healthy Recipe Challenge | A White House State Dinner Winner |
| 2015 | Sixth Annual Shorty Awards | Nominated for Food |
| 2015 | Reality TV Awards - MasterChef Junior | Best New Cast MasterChef Junior Season 2 |
| 2016 | Time | Time Magazine's 30 Most Influential Teens |
| 2016 | 37th Young Artist Awards Hollywood | Presenter & Nominee - Best Performance in a TV Series – Guest Starring Young Actor (11–13) |
| 2016 | Space Camp Huntsville, Alabama | Commander's Cup Awardee |
| 2016 | James Beard Foundation | Blended Burger Winner |
| 2016 | Fortune Magazine | 18 Under 18 |
| 2016 | Southern Living Magazine | The Next Best Southern Cook |
| 2017 | Chef Works | Chef of January 2017 |
| 2018 | Gourmand World Cookbook Award | The Best New Cookbook US |
| 2018 | Gourmand World Cookbook Award | The Best New Cookbook in the World |
| 2018 | TEDx Speaker | The Art of The Flavor Speech |
| 2019 | Teen Choice Awards | Winner - Teen Choice Take Note Award |
| 2020 | The SPARK Award | Youth Charity Award |

== Bibliography ==
- Logan Guleff (2017), Logan's Chef Notes & Half Baked Tales – Cooking Dreams, Memphis, Tennessee USA: Logan Guleff, OL 26233407M

ISBN 9780971157613

- Moshe Goldstein (2022), Starter Mindset, Chater 4 FOOD:LOGAN: New Degree Press

ISBN 9798885049139

== See also ==
- List of people from Memphis, Tennessee
