= MasterChef Junior (American TV series) season 6 =

Season of television series

MasterChef Junior
- Season 6
- Promotional poster for season 6, featuring (2nd row, L to R) judges Joe Bastianich, Christina Tosi, and Gordon Ramsay
- Judges: Gordon Ramsay; Christina Tosi; Joe Bastianich
- No. of contestants: 24
- Winner: Beni Cwiakala
- Runners-up: Avery Meadows; Quani Fields
- No. of episodes: 15

Release
- Original network: Fox
- Original release: March 2 – May 18, 2018

Season chronology
- ← Previous; Season 5 Next → Season 7

The sixth season of the American competitive reality television series MasterChef Junior premiered on Fox on March 2, 2018, and concluded on May 18, 2018. The season is hosted by regular judges Gordon Ramsay, Christina Tosi, and returning judge Joe Bastianich.

The winner was Beni Cwiakala, a 9-year-old from Chicago, Illinois, with Avery Meadows from Kingwood, Texas and Quani Fields from Lawrenceville, Georgia being the runners-up. This marks the first time that three contestants have gone against each other in the finale.

== Top 24 ==
Contestant	Age	Hometown	Status
Beni Cwiakala	9	Chicago, Illinois	Winner May 18
Avery Meadows	8	Kingwood, Texas	Runners-Up May 18
Quani Fields	11	Lawrenceville, Georgia	Runners-Up May 18
Mikey DiTomasso	10	Clarendon Hills, Illinois	Eliminated May 4
Remy Bond	12	New York, New York	Eliminated May 4
Evan Estrada	11	San Diego, California	Eliminated May 4
Olivia Bond	10	New York, New York	Eliminated May 4
Anthony Martino	10	Old Bridge, New Jersey	Eliminated April 20
Cade Ortego	11	Hattiesburg, Mississippi	Eliminated April 20
Ariana Feygin	12	Excelsior, Minnesota	Eliminated April 20
Henry Hummeldorf	9	Katy, Texas	Eliminated April 20
Sammy Vieder	12	Huntington Woods, Michigan	Eliminated April 20
Emily Chavez	9	Sylmar, California	Eliminated April 13
Pierce Cleaveland	10	Oak Park, Illinois	Eliminated April 13
Camson Alevy	13	Fleming Island, Florida	Eliminated April 6
Maria Dakis	8	Northridge, California	Eliminated April 6
Mackenzie Patten	9	Newhall, California	Eliminated March 30
Sophia Stark	12	Honolulu, Hawaii	Eliminated March 30
Ben Watkins	10	Gary, Indiana	Eliminated March 23
Gracie Howard	9	Cardiff by the Sea, California	Eliminated March 23
Grayson Boudreaux	11	St. Francisville, Louisiana	Eliminated March 16
Lindsay Hayes	10	Elk Rapids, Michigan	Eliminated March 16
Juelz Bugg	8	St. Louis, Missouri	Eliminated March 9
Zia Nelson	9	Pasadena, California	Eliminated March 9

== Elimination table ==
Place	Contestant	Episode																			
Place	Contestant	3		4		5	6		7		8	9		10		11		12	13		14/15
1	Beni	HIGH	IN	IMM	IN	WIN	IN	WIN	IN	IMM	PT	HIGH	WIN	WIN	IMM	IN	IN	WIN	IN	HIGH	WINNER
2	Avery	IN	LOW	IMM	IN	IN	IN	IN	IMM	LOW	WIN	IN	WIN	IN	WIN	WIN	IMM	WIN	IN	HIGH	RUNNERS-UP
2	Quani	IN	LOW	LOW	LOW	IN	IN	LOW	IN	IMM	PT	IN	LOW	WIN	IMM	HIGH	IN	WIN	WIN	IMM	RUNNERS-UP
4	Mikey	IN	IN	IMM	IN	WIN	IN	IN	LOW	HIGH	PT	IN	IN	IN	IN	IN	WIN	IMM	IN	ELIM	
4	Remy	WIN	IMM	IMM	IN	WIN	WIN	IMM	IMM	LOW	WIN	IN	IN	WIN	IMM	IN	LOW	PT	IN	ELIM	
6	Evan	IN	IN	IN	IMM	IN	IN	IN	IMM	WIN	WIN	IN	LOW	IN	IN	HIGH	LOW	ELIM			
6	Olivia	IN	IN	WIN	IMM	WIN	IN	IN	WIN	IMM	WIN	IN	LOW	IN	WIN	IN	IN	ELIM			
8	Anthony	IN	IN	WIN	IMM	WIN	IN	HIGH	IMM	IN	LOW	IN	IN	IN	LOW	IN	ELIM				
8	Cade	IN	IN	IMM	WIN	LOW	IN	LOW	IMM	IN	PT	IN	IN	WIN	IMM	IN	ELIM				
10	Ariana	IN	IN	IMM	WIN	WIN	IN	HIGH	IMM	IN	WIN	HIGH	LOW	IN	ELIM						
10	Henry	HIGH	IN	WIN	IMM	IN	IN	IN	IMM	IN	WIN	IN	IMM	IN	ELIM						
10	Sammy	IN	IN	LOW	IN	IN	IN	IN	IMM	IN	WIN	WIN	IMM	IN	ELIM						
13	Emily	IN	IN	IMM	IN	WIN	IN	IN	WIN	IMM	ELIM										
13	Pierce	IN	IN	IN	IMM	WIN	HIGH	IMM	LOW	IN	ELIM										
15	Camson	IN	IN	IMM	IN	IN	IN	IN	IMM	ELIM											
15	Maria	IN	IN	IMM	IN	WIN	HIGH	IMM	IMM	ELIM											
17	Mackenzie	IN	IN	IMM	IN	WIN	IN	ELIM													
17	Sophia	IN	IN	IMM	IN	IN	IN	ELIM													
19	Ben	IN	LOW	LOW	LOW	ELIM															
19	Gracie	IN	IN	IN	IMM	ELIM															
21	Grayson	IN	IN	IMM	ELIM																
21	Lindsay	IN	LOW	IMM	ELIM																
23	Juelz	IN	ELIM																		
23	Zia	IN	ELIM																		

(WINNER) This cook won the competition.
(RUNNERS-UP) These cooks finished in second place.
(WIN) The cook won an individual challenge (Mystery Box Challenge, Elimination Test, or Skills Challenge).
(WIN) The cook was on the winning team in the Team Challenge and directly advanced to the next round.
(HIGH) The cook was one of the top entries in the individual challenge but didn't win.
(IN) The cook was not selected as a top or bottom entry in an individual challenge.
(IN) The cook was not selected as a top or bottom entry in a Team Challenge.
(IMM) The cook did not have to compete in that round of the competition and was safe from elimination.
(IMM) The cook was selected by the Mystery Box Challenge winner and didn't have to compete in the Elimination Test.
(LOW) The cook was one of the bottom entries in an individual challenge or Pressure Test advanced.
(LOW) The cook was one of the bottom entries in a Team Challenge, and they advanced.
(PT) The cook was on the losing team in the Team Challenge, competed in the Pressure Test, and advanced.
(ELIM) The cook was eliminated.

== Guest appearances ==
- Matilda Ramsay − Episode 7
- Alexander Weiss, Logan Guleff, Nathan Odom, Addison Osta Smith, Jasmine Stewart and other MasterChef Junior alumni − Episode 12

== Episodes ==
No. overall	No. in season	Title	Original release date	U.S. viewers (millions)
50	1	"Girls Just Wanna Have Fun"	March 2, 2018	3.40
40 junior chefs are competing for a spot in the Top 24. The kids are divided into boys and girls, 20 of each, and 12 of each will move on. The girls compete first and must cook a medium-rare filet mignon and a side dish in 25 minutes. The first eight to advance are Ariana, Zia, Sophia, Avery, Emily, Beni, Gracie, and Remy. After Noelani, Addyson, Aubrey and Nadia are eliminated, the remaining eight must cook their signature dish in one hour to try to earn a spot. The final four aprons are given to Mackenzie, Lindsay, Olivia, and Maria, while Laken, Chloe, Lila and Abby are sent home.
51	2	"The Boys Are Back in Town"	March 2, 2018	3.40
The remaining 20 boys compete for the final 12 spots in the Top 24, and they must cook a chicken breast and a side dish in 25 minutes. The first eight to advance are Sammy, Juelz, Grayson, Camson, Henry, Cade, Mikey, and Pierce. After Kolby, Elliot, Jadon and Felix are eliminated, the remaining eight must cook their signature dish in one hour to try to earn a spot. The final four aprons are given to Anthony, Quani, Evan, and Ben, while Drew, Luca, Chuk and Tyler are sent home.
52	3	"Culinary ABC's"	March 9, 2018	3.34
Mystery Box Challenge: The contestants are given 26 ingredients each with letters starting from A to Z to cook their dish with. The top three dishes belong to Remy, Beni and Henry. Remy wins this challenge and is immune for the next challenge.; Challenge Winner/Immune: Remy Bond; Elimination Challenge: The remaining kids have one hour to make a fruit tart with their own choice of fruit and pastry cream flavor. Avery, Ben, Juelz, Lindsay, Quani, and Zia fail to impress the judges.; Bottom six: Avery Meadows, Ben Watkins, Juelz Bugg, Lindsay Hayes, Quani Fields and Zia Nelson; Avery and Lindsay are the first two to be saved, and then Quani and Ben are saved, sending Juelz and Zia home.; Eliminated: Juelz Bugg and Zia Nelson
53	4	"American Classics"	March 16, 2018	3.50
Team Challenge: The kids draw straws to determine who will compete in the challenge. Anthony, Ben, Evan, Gracie, Olivia, Pierce, Henry, Quani, and Sammy draw colored straws and must compete. Ben, Quani, and Sammy form the red team; Evan, Gracie, and Pierce form the blue team; while Henry, Olivia, and Anthony form the yellow team. Each team has ten minutes to make as many perfect milkshakes as possible. The losing team has to compete in the next challenge. The yellow team has the most perfect milkshakes and the blue team makes enough milkshakes to save themselves. The yellow and blue teams get to dump whipped cream on Joe in a giant glass of milkshake.; Challenge Winners/Immune: Anthony Martino, Henry Hummeldorf, Olivia Bond; Immune: Evan Estrada, Gracie Howard, Pierce Cleaveland; Elimination Challenge: The red team and the rest of the kids have 45 minutes to make their own take on a chicken and waffles dish. Ariana and Cade win this challenge, making them team captains in the next team challenge. Quani, Grayson, Lindsay and Ben have the worst dishes.; Winner: Ariana Feygin and Cade Ortego; Bottom four: Ben Watkins, Grayson Boudreaux, Lindsay Hayes and Quani Fields.; The judges save Ben and Quani, sending Grayson and Lindsay home.; Eliminated: Grayson Boudreaux and Lindsay Hayes
54	5	"Recipe for Love"	March 23, 2018	3.32
Team Challenge: The kids are split into two teams with Cade and Ariana as team captains. Cade leads the Red Team with Avery, Ben, Camson, Evan, Gracie, Henry, Quani, Sammy, and Sophia while Ariana leads the Blue Team with Anthony, Beni, Emily, Mackenzie, Maria, Mikey, Olivia, Pierce, and Remy. They are taken to a farm location where they must cook lunch for a wedding with 75 guests. They will have one hour to prep and cook their halibut and rack of lamb dish. The judges will choose the winning team back in the Masterchef kitchen. The Blue Team wins and gets immunity. Ben, Cade, and Gracie are deemed the worst performers on their team.; Challenge Winners/Immune: Anthony Martino, Ariana Feygin, Beni Cwiakala, Emily Chavez, Mackenzie Patten, Maria Dakis, Mikey DiTomasso, Olivia Bond, Pierce Cleaveland and Remy Bond; Bottom three: Ben Watkins, Cade Ortego and Gracie Howard; Cade is saved, sending Ben and Gracie home.; Eliminated: Ben Watkins and Gracie Howard
55	6	"No Sugar, Sugar"	March 30, 2018	3.06
Mystery Box Challenge: After having a massive amount of sugar poured onto them, the kids must make a dessert in 60 minutes with the mystery box ingredients of various natural sweeteners and without processed sugar. The winning recipe will also be published in Family Circle magazine. The top three dishes belong to Pierce, Maria and Remy. Remy wins this challenge and is immune for the next challenge. Pierce and Maria also earn immunity.; Challenge Winner/Immune: Remy Bond; Immune: Maria Dakis and Pierce Cleaveland; Elimination Challenge: With the judges dressed in costume, the remaining kids must make a dish based on their cultural heritage within 60 minutes. The best dishes belong to Ariana, Anthony, and Beni who is declared the overall winner. The bottom four dishes belong to Quani, Cade, Mackenzie, and Sophia.; Winner: Beni Cwiakala; Bottom four: Cade Ortego, Mackenzie Patten, Quani Fields and Sophia Stark; Quani and Cade are saved, sending Mackenzie and Sophia home.; Eliminated: Mackenzie Patten and Sophia Stark
56	7	"Donut Sweat It"	April 6, 2018	3.54
Team Challenge: The kids randomly select from a box of donuts and six of them will be paired up into teams to compete. Emily and Olivia are the Red Team, Beni and Quani are the Yellow Team, and Mikey and Pierce are the Green Team. The teams will have ten minutes to make as many perfectly decorated donuts as possible, but they must do so while having one of each of their legs tied together in the style of a three-legged race. The top two teams will earn immunity. The Red Team wins the challenge with the Yellow Team finishing second, and the judges have frosting and sprinkles dumped on them.; Winners/Immune: Emily Chavez and Olivia Bond; Immune: Beni Cwiakala and Quani Fields; Elimination Challenge: Gordon's daughter, Matilda Ramsay, demonstrates her rendition of a burger and fries which the remaining contestants must replicate in 45 minutes. Evan wins the challenge with Mikey called out as a top cook as well. The bottom four cooks are Camson, Avery, Maria and Remy.; Winner: Evan Estrada; Bottom four: Avery Meadows, Camson Alevy, Maria Dakis and Remy Bond; Avery and Remy are saved, sending Camson and Maria home.; Eliminated: Camson Alevy and Maria Dakis
57	8	"Room Service"	April 13, 2018	2.89
Team Challenge: The kids are split into two teams, with Evan and Mikey as team captains since they had the two best dishes in the last challenge. Mikey captains the Red Team with Anthony, Cade, Quani, Beni, Emily and Pierce while Evan captains the Blue Team with Sammy, Ariana, Henry, Avery, Olivia and Remy. They are taken to a Hilton Hotel where they must prepare room service breakfast dishes. Any dish not ready by the requested time frame will not be counted for a vote. The Blue Team wins with 58% of the vote and the entire team earns immunity.; Winners/Immune: Ariana Feygin, Avery Meadows, Evan Estrada, Henry Hummeldorf, Olivia Bond, Remy Bond and Sammy Vieder; Pressure Test: The Red Team members must prepare a risotto dish as demonstrated by Joe in 30 minutes. The bottom dishes belong to Pierce, Emily and Anthony.; Bottom three: Anthony Martino, Emily Chavez and Pierce Cleaveland; Anthony is saved, sending Emily and Pierce home.; Eliminated: Emily Chavez and Pierce Cleveland
58	9	"Tag Team"	April 13, 2018	2.89
Mystery Box Challenge: The Mystery Boxes contain empty boxes from Blue Apron, and the kids must prepare a dish in 45 minutes with the winning dish published and distributed by Blue Apron. Gordon joins the cooking with about 20 minutes left. The top three dishes belong to Sammy, Ariana and Beni. Sammy wins this challenge and is immune for the next challenge.; Winner/Immune: Sammy Vieder; Elimination Challenge: This test will be a tag-team challenge with Sammy picking the teams as well as saving one kid from the challenge. Sammy saves Henry then pairs Remy with Anthony, Ariana with Evan, Beni with Avery, Olivia with Quani and Mikey with Cade. The teams must replicate a platter of Asian appetizers in 60 minutes with only one of the kids cooking at a time and switching out every 10 minutes. The winning team is Beni and Avery. The teams of Ariana and Evan along with Olivia and Quani are on the bottom.; Immune: Henry Hummeldorf; Winners: Avery Meadows and Beni Cwiakala; Bottom four: Ariana Feygin, Evan Estrada, Olivia Bond and Quani Fields; The judges decide to save all four contestants.; Eliminated: None
59	10	"Crackin' Under Pressure"	April 20, 2018	3.12
Team Challenge: The kids pick random eggs that have had their yolks colored and smash them against their heads to determine teams. The Red Team is Mikey, Olivia, Henry and Anthony; the Green Team is Avery, Evan, Ariana and Sammy; and the Blue Team is Remy, Quani, Beni and Cade. Teams must make as many perfect dishes of eggs Benedict as possible in 15 minutes. The Blue Team wins with 9 dishes while the other two teams get eggs dumped on them.; Challenge Winners/Immune: Beni Cwiakala, Cade Ortego, Quani Fields and Remy Bond; Elimination Challenge: The remaining kids have 30 minutes to make an egg-yolk ravioli dish as demonstrated by Joe. The two best dishes belong to Olivia and Avery. The bottom dishes belong to Henry, Anthony, Ariana and Sammy.; Winners: Avery Meadows and Olivia Bond; Bottom four: Anthony Martino, Ariana Feygin, Henry Hummeldorf and Sammy Vieder; The judges save only Anthony, thus eliminating the other three.; Eliminated: Ariana Feygin, Henry Hummeldorf and Sammy Vieder
60	11	"A Can Do Attitude"	April 20, 2018	3.12
Mystery Box Challenge: The boxes contain canned ingredients without labels and the kids have one hour to make a dish using at least one of the canned goods with the help of staple pantry ingredients. The top three dishes belong to Quani, Evan and Avery, and Avery has the winning dish.; Challenge Winner/Immune: Avery Meadows; Elimination Challenge: The remaining kids have one hour to make a dish featuring chocolate, and the winner will be immune from elimination all the way to the semi-finals. Avery is given the option to give up her immunity to compete for this larger immunity but she declines. Mikey wins the challenge and the immunity while Anthony, Remy, Evan and Cade are the bottom four.; Winner/Immune Through Semi-Finals: Mikey DiTomasso; Bottom four: Anthony Martino, Cade Ortego, Evan Estrada and Remy Bond; The judges eliminate Anthony and Cade.; Eliminated: Anthony Martino and Cade Ortego
61	12	"Pop Up Restaurant"	May 4, 2018	2.83
Team Challenge: The kids are taken to a pop-up restaurant location where they have been split into teams. Quani captains the Red Team with Avery and Beni while Olivia captains the Blue Team with Remy and Evan. Since Mikey is immune, he does not have to compete. The kids will cook a branzino and clams meal for 30 former MasterChef Junior contestants, including every previous season winner. The judges will determine the winning team based on overall performance. The Red Team wins the challenge.; Immune: Mikey DiTomasso; Challenge Winners/Immune: Avery Meadows, Beni Cwiakala and Quani Fields; Pressure Test: Season five winner Jasmine Stewart returns to the kitchen to introduce the challenge dish which is a box of French macarons. The Blue Team members must make their own box of macarons in 75 minutes.; Bottom three: Evan Estrada, Olivia Bond and Remy Bond; Evan and Olivia are eliminated.; Eliminated: Evan Estrada and Olivia Bond
62	13	"Grandma Gordon"	May 4, 2018	2.83
Individual Challenge: The judges dress as senior citizens and have the kids joined by their respective grandmothers. The kids must make a dish in 60 minutes inspired by their grandmothers. The winner will automatically advance into the finals which will have three contestants this year. Quani wins this challenge.; Winner/Finalist: Quani Fields; Elimination Challenge: The remaining kids are assigned different types of fish by Quani and must make a dish with that fish in 45 minutes. Quani gives salmon to Remy, striped bass to Mikey, sardines to Avery and mackerel to Beni.; Bottom four: Avery Meadows, Beni Cwiakala, Mikey DiTomasso and Remy Bond; Avery and Beni advance to the finals, eliminating Mikey and Remy.; Finalists: Avery Meadows and Beni Cwiakala; Eliminated: Mikey DiTomasso and Remy Bond
63	14	"The Finale, Part 1"	May 18, 2018	3.32
Season Finale: The three finalists must prepare their best appetizer, entrée, and dessert. They will have 60 minutes to prepare each course and will be judged at the end of each course.; Appetizer: Avery serves grilled lobster with avocado crema, salsa de tejas and a blue corn crisp. Quani serves grilled spot prawns with a crispy grit cake, fried green tomato and crab chow-chow. Beni serves smoked salmon with corn blini, pickled radishes and a lemon-herb créme fraíche.; The entrées begin cooking as the episode ends.
64	15	"The Finale, Part 2 - The Winner"	May 18, 2018	3.32
Entrée: Avery serves seared ribeye cap with mustard greens, glazed onions, chimichurri and bone marrow butter. Quani serves duck fat fried catfish with spicy greens, pickled okra and corn purée. Beni serves grilled veal chop with beet-potato fondant, red cabbage sauerkraut and mustard cream sauce.; Dessert: Beni serves deconstructed apple tartlet with walnut crumble, apple-brandy cream and cranberry coulis. Quani serves blueberry tart with marshmallow meringue, blueberries and lemon poppy seed tuile. Avery serves tres leches cake with salted caramel sauce, kettle corn and whipped cream.; Final three: Avery Meadows, Beni Cwiakala and Quani Fields; Winner Announced: Beni is announced as the sixth MasterChef Junior winner, taking home the trophy and the $100,000 prize.; MasterChef Junior Winner: Beni Cwiakala
