= MasterChef Junior (American TV series) season 3 =

Season of television series

MasterChef Junior
- Season 3
- Judges: Joe Bastianich; Graham Elliot; Gordon Ramsay
- No. of contestants: 19
- Winner: Nathan Odom
- Runner-up: Andrew Zappley
- No. of episodes: 8

Release
- Original network: Fox
- Original release: January 6 – February 24, 2015

Season chronology
- ← Previous; Season 2 Next → Season 4

The third season of the American competitive reality television series MasterChef Junior premiered on Fox on January 6, 2015, and concluded on February 24, 2015.

The winner was Nathan Odom, a 12-year-old from San Diego, California, with 11-year-old Andrew Zappley from West Deptford Township, New Jersey finishing as the runner-up.

== Top 19 ==
Contestant	Age	Hometown	Status
Nathan Odom	12	San Diego, California	Winner February 24
Andrew Zappley	11	West Deptford Township, New Jersey	Runner-Up February 24
Jenna Kloner	12	New York, New York	Eliminated February 17
Jimmy Warshawsky	12	Santa Clarita, California	Eliminated February 17
Ayla Destiny	11	St. Louis, Missouri	Eliminated February 10
Kayla Mitchell	11	Center Moriches, New York	Eliminated February 10
Riley Hahn	8	Carrollton, Texas	Eliminated February 3
Ryan Kate Brandenburg	11	Coppell, Texas	Eliminated February 3
Cory Nieves	9	Englewood, New Jersey	Eliminated January 27
Jack Lembeck	12	Chicago, Illinois	Eliminated January 27
Kyler Bock	10	Coto de Caza, California	Eliminated January 20
Mia Wurster	10	Menlo Park, California	Eliminated January 20
Alexis Higgins	8	Gilroy, California	Eliminated January 13
Micah Sanders	9	Detroit, Michigan	Eliminated January 13
Anjelica "AJ" Espinoza	10	Freeport, New York	Eliminated January 6
Jianna Garcia	9	Providence Village, Texas	Eliminated January 6
Parker LaRocco	11	New Buffalo, Michigan	Eliminated January 6
Phillip "Philly" Vazzana	9	Chicago, Illinois	Eliminated January 6
Quincy Jamieson	12	Los Angeles, California	Eliminated January 6

== Elimination table ==
Place	Competitor	Episode													
Place	Competitor	1		2		3		4		5		6	7		8
1	Nathan	IN	IN	IMM	IN	IN	WIN	IN	IN	WIN	IMM	WIN	IN	WIN	WINNER
2	Andrew	IN	WIN	IN	LOW	WIN	IMM	IMM	IN	IN	WIN	WIN	IN	IN	RUNNER-UP
3	Jenna	WIN	IMM	IMM	WIN	IN	WIN	WIN	LOW	HIGH	IN	WIN	IN	ELIM	
3	Jimmy	IN	WIN	WIN	IN	IN	LOW	IMM	WIN	IN	WIN	LOW	WIN	ELIM	
5	Ayla	IN	IN	IMM	IN	IN	IN	IMM	WIN	IN	IN	ELIM			
5	Kayla	WIN	IMM	IMM	IN	IN	IN	IMM	LOW	IN	LOW	ELIM			
7	Riley	IN	IN	IMM	IN	HIGH	IN	IMM	IN	IN	ELIM				
7	Ryan Kate	IN	WIN	IN	IN	IN	IN	IMM	IN	HIGH	ELIM				
9	Cory	IN	IN	IMM	LOW	IN	WIN	IN	ELIM						
9	Jack	WIN	IMM	IMM	IN	HIGH	IN	IMM	ELIM						
11	Kyler	IN	IN	IMM	IN	IN	ELIM								
11	Mia	IN	IN	IMM	WIN	IN	ELIM								
13	Alexis	IN	IN	IMM	ELIM										
13	Micah	IN	IN	IMM	ELIM										
15	AJ	IN	ELIM												
15	Jianna	IN	ELIM												
15	Parker	IN	ELIM												
15	Philly	IN	ELIM												
15	Quincy	IN	ELIM												

(WINNER) This cook won the competition.
(RUNNER-UP) This cook finished in second place.
(WIN) The cook won an individual challenge (Mystery Box Challenge or Elimination Test).
(WIN) The cook was on the winning team in the Team Challenge and directly advanced to the next round.
(HIGH) The cook was one of the top entries in the individual challenge but didn't win.
(IN) The cook was not selected as a top or bottom entry in an individual challenge.
(IN) The cook was not selected as a top or bottom entry in a Team Challenge.
(IMM) The cook did not have to compete in that round of the competition and was safe from elimination.
(LOW) The cook was one of the bottom entries in an individual challenge and advanced.
(LOW) The cook was one of the bottom entries in a Team Challenge advanced.
(ELIM) The cook was eliminated.

== Episodes ==
No. overall	No. in season	Title	Original release date	U.S. viewers (millions)
15	1	"The Class of 2015"	January 6, 2015	5.33
Mystery Box Challenge: The kids open their mystery boxes and must create dish using the ingredients. The top three dishes are Jenna's, Jack's, and Kayla's. All three contestants end up winning the challenge.; Challenge Winners/Immune: Jack Lembeck, Jenna Kloner and Kayla Mitchell; Elimination Challenge: The theme of the Elimination Challenge is Pasta. Jenna, Jack, and Kayla are safe from elimination, do not have to participate in this challenge, and get to choose which pasta the other contestants get to make. They choose the pappardelle. The judges call down Jianna, Quincy, Parker, Philly, AJ, Ryan Kate, Jimmy, and Andrew. They say that Jimmy, Ryan Kate, and Andrew have the best dishes of the night, thus eliminating Jianna, Quincy, Parker, Philly, and AJ.; Winners: Andrew Zappley, Jimmy Warshawsky and Ryan Kate Brandenburg; Eliminated: AJ Espinoza, Jianna Garcia, Parker LaRocco, Philly Vazzana and Quincy Jamieson
16	2	"Easy as Pie"	January 13, 2015	4.93
Individual Challenge: Andrew, Jimmy, and Ryan Kate participate in this challenge, while the other contestants sit out. They have to whip up enough meringue for twelve lemon meringue pies. The first person to finish not only gets an advantage in the next challenge, but the winner gets to throw their pie with the most meringue either on Gordon, Graham, or Joe's face. Jimmy wins and gets to throw his pie onto Graham's face.; Challenge Winner: Jimmy Warshawsky; Team Challenge: The contestants compete in a team challenge to make sausages and prepare them. Jimmy gets to choose the teams. He pairs Andrew with Cory, then asks Kyler to join him. The other teams consist of Mia and Jenna, Ayla and Riley, Jack and Nathan, Ryan Kate and Kayla, and Micah and Alexis. Mia and Jenna are declared as the winners of this challenge.; Team Challenge Winners: Jenna Kloner and Mia Wurster; Bottom four: Alexis Higgins, Andrew Zappley, Cory Nieves and Micah Sanders; Micah and Alexis are eliminated.; Eliminated: Alexis Higgins and Micah Sanders
17	3	"Grandad Gordon!"	January 20, 2015	5.53
Mystery Box Challenge: This week's Mystery Box contains ingredients that get better with age. The top three dishes are Jack's, Riley's, and Andrew's. Andrew is declared as the winner of the Mystery Box.; Challenge Winner/Immune: Andrew Zappley; Elimination Challenge: Andrew is immune from elimination. The theme for the elimination test is "scary reptiles". Andrew chooses alligator. Jenna's, Cory's, and Nathan's are deemed to be the best three dishes.; Winners: Cory Nieves, Jenna Kloner and Nathan Odom; Bottom three: Jimmy Warshawsky, Kyler Bock and Mia Wurster; The judges save Jimmy, eliminating Kyler and Mia.; Eliminated: Kyler Bock and Mia Wurster
18	4	"Raw Talent"	January 27, 2015	5.15
Individual Challenge: Cory, Nathan, and Jenna race to find the most ingredients in a pantry full of unlabeled items within two minutes. They are each given a list of twenty random items to find. Jenna wins the challenge by correctly finding ten of the twenty items.; Challenge Winner: Jenna Kloner; Team Challenge: Jenna gets to pick the teams for the team challenge. She picks Kayla as her own teammate, then pairs Andrew with Riley, Ryan Kate with Nathan, Jack with Cory, and Jimmy with Ayla. The teams compete in an hour-long tag-team challenge to cook the best sushi platter. Only one teammate can cook at a time; the other can only watch and give advice. Teammates swap roles with each other every ten minutes. Jimmy and Ayla win the team challenge.; Team Challenge Winners: Ayla Destiny and Jimmy Warshawsky; Bottom four: Cory Nieves, Jack Lembeck, Jenna Kloner and Kayla Mitchell; Jack and Cory are eliminated.; Eliminated: Cory Nieves and Jack Lembeck
19	5	"Family Style"	February 3, 2015	4.96
Mystery Box Challenge: The top eight home cooks must make banana dishes. The top three dishes are Jenna's, Nathan's, and Ryan Kate's. The judges declare Nathan as the winner of the Mystery Box challenge.; Challenge Winner/Immune: Nathan Odom; Elimination Challenge: Nathan is given immunity. The remaining contestants are required to make a salmon en croute, with help from Matilda Ramsay, Gordon's daughter. Andrew and Jimmy have the best dishes, and are made team captains in the next challenge. Jenna and Ayla also do well enough to move on to the next round.; Winners: Andrew Zappley and Jimmy Warshawsky; Bottom three: Kayla Mitchell, Riley Hahn and Ryan Kate Brandenburg; The judges save Kayla, eliminating Riley and Ryan Kate.; Eliminated: Riley Hahn and Ryan Kate Brandenburg
20	6	"Restaurant Takeover"	February 10, 2015	4.57
Team Challenge: The contestants have to cook in the restaurant takeover. Andrew and Jimmy are team captains, with Andrew getting first pick. Andrew chooses Nathan and Jenna for his Blue Team, and Jimmy chooses Ayla and Kayla for his Red Team. Each team must create appetizers and entrées for the customers. The Blue Team is deemed to take the win.; Team Challenge Winners: Andrew Zappley, Jenna Kloner and Nathan Odom; Bottom three: Ayla Destiny, Jimmy Warshawsky and Kayla Mitchell; The judges save Jimmy, leading to the elimination of Ayla and Kayla.; Eliminated: Ayla Destiny and Kayla Mitchell
21	7	"The Crème de la Crème…Brulee"	February 17, 2015	5.48
Mystery Box Challenge: The remaining contestants must make as many crème brûlées as they can. Nathan only has one perfect crème brûlée, while Jenna only has four. Jimmy makes eight perfect, and Andrew only has four, giving Jimmy the win.; Challenge Winner: Jimmy Warshawsky; Elimination Challenge: Jimmy is not safe from elimination. The elimination theme is raspberries. For winning the mystery box challenge, Jimmy gets to choose his and the other's raspberry dishes. Two cooks will be sent home after this challenge. Nathan gets the raspberry tart, Andrew the raspberry mousse, Jenna the raspberry Napoleon, and Jimmy is left with the raspberry trifle. Nathan becomes the first finalist, for having the best dish in the challenge.; Winner: Nathan Odom; The judges send Andrew to the finale as well, eliminating Jimmy and Jenna.; Eliminated: Jenna Kloner and Jimmy Warshawsky
22	8	"The Finale"	February 24, 2015	4.83
Season Finale: The judges want the finalists to prepare and present a seamless, stylistic three-course dinner in 90 minutes.; Appetizer: Nathan makes roasted fennel and gruyere cheese au gratin, topped with French ham and a side of shaved fennel and grapefruit cream salad. Andrew produces a home-made herbed ricotta cheese with roasted beets and pumpernickel bread.; Entree: Nathan makes a herb-crusted lamb chop with fresh morels and fava beans, shaved asparagus and white asparagus puree. Andrew produces a beef-cheek ravioli with a pan sauce and shaved parmesan cheese.; Dessert: Nathan makes an Earl Grey tea and Meyer lemon Tart with candied orange peel, matcha pretzel, and a side of blood orange coulis. Andrew produces a sweet arborio rice risotto with a verjus reduction and figs.; Final Two: Andrew Zappley and Nathan Odom; Winner Revealed: Nathan is announced as the third MasterChef Junior winner, taking home the trophy and the $100,000 prize, making Andrew the runner-up.; Masterchef Junior Winner: Nathan Odom
