= MasterChef Junior (American TV series) season 1 =

Season of television series

MasterChef Junior
- Season 1
- Promotional poster for season 1, featuring (2nd row, L to R) judges Graham Elliot, Joe Bastianich, and Gordon Ramsay
- Judges: Joe Bastianich; Graham Elliot; Gordon Ramsay
- No. of contestants: 12
- Winner: Alexander Weiss
- Runner-up: Dara Yu
- No. of episodes: 7

Release
- Original network: Fox
- Original release: September 27 – November 8, 2013

Season chronology
- Next → Season 2

The first season of the American competitive reality television series MasterChef Junior premiered on Fox on September 27, 2013, and concluded on November 8, 2013.

The winner was Alexander Weiss, a 13-year-old from New York City, New York, with Dara Yu from Los Angeles, California being the runner-up. Dara later returned to MasterChef as an adult and won its 12th season.

== Top 12 ==
Contestant	Age	Hometown	Status
Alexander Weiss	13	New York City, New York	Winner November 8
Dara Yu	12	Los Angeles, California	Runner-Up November 8
Jack Hoffman	10	East Rockaway, New York	Eliminated November 1
Troy Glass	12	Thousand Oaks, California	Eliminated November 1
Gavin Pola	10	San Francisco, California	Eliminated October 25
Sarah Lane	9	Pacific Palisades, California	Eliminated October 25
Kaylen Alfred	11	Culver City, California	Eliminated October 18
Sofia Hublitz	12	Brooklyn, New York	Eliminated October 18
Jewels Gold	12	Santa Ana, California	Eliminated October 11
Roen Guerin	12	Brooklyn, New York	Eliminated October 11
Molly Round	12	Pasadena, California	Eliminated October 4
Tommy Peters	11	Palos Verdes Estates, California	Eliminated October 4

== Elimination table ==
Place	Contestant	Episode									
Place	Contestant	2		3		4		5	6		7
1	Alexander	HIGH	WIN	WIN	IN	HIGH	LOW	WIN	IN	WIN	WINNER
2	Dara	IN	IN	IMM	WIN	IN	WIN	WIN	IN	IN	RUNNER-UP
3	Jack	WIN	IMM	IMM	LOW	IN	IN	WIN	IN	ELIM	
3	Troy	HIGH	IN	IMM	IN	HIGH	LOW	LOW	WIN	ELIM	
5	Gavin	IN	WIN	IN	IN	IN	WIN	ELIM			
5	Sarah	IN	IN	IMM	WIN	WIN	IMM	ELIM			
7	Kaylen	IN	WIN	IN	LOW	IN	ELIM				
7	Sofia	IN	IN	IMM	IN	IN	ELIM				
9	Jewels	IN	LOW	IMM	ELIM						
9	Roen	IN	IN	IMM	ELIM						
11	Molly	IN	ELIM								
11	Tommy	IN	ELIM								

(WINNER) This cook won the competition.
(RUNNER-UP) This cook finished in second place.
(WIN) The cook won an individual challenge (Mystery Box Challenge or Elimination Test).
(WIN) The cook was on the winning team in the Team Challenge and directly advanced to the next round.
(HIGH) The cook was one of the top entries in an individual challenge but did not win.
(IN) The cook was not selected as a top or bottom entry in an individual challenge.
(IN) The cook was not selected as a top or bottom entry in a Team Challenge.
(IMM) The cook did not have to compete in that round of competition and was safe from elimination.
(LOW) The cook was one of the bottom entries in an individual challenge, and advanced.
(LOW) The cook was one of the bottom entries in a Team Challenge, advanced.
(ELIM) The cook was eliminated.

== Episodes ==
No. overall	No. in season	Title	Original release date	U.S. viewers (millions)
1	1	"Here Come the Kids"	September 27, 2013	4.29
Twenty-four child chefs compete for a spot in the top twelve. The children are split up into three groups of eight. The first group is assigned to create a seafood dish of their choosing. Sofia, Roen, Jack, and Molly advance into the top twelve, while Mina, Justin, Daniel, and Franco are eliminated. The second group is assigned to create a plate of fresh pasta. Dara, Tommy, Jewels, Troy, and Gavin advance to the next round, while Noah, Sage, and Sara are eliminated. The final group has to create a dessert. Alexander, Sarah, and Kaylen finish up the top twelve lineup, while Amanda, Lishai, Hana, Nathan, and Ethan are eliminated.
2	2	"School's Out... But the MasterChef Kitchen is Open!"	October 4, 2013	3.95
Mystery Box Challenge: The top three for the mystery box are Alexander's, Jack's, and Troy's. Jack's dish is deemed the best.; Challenge Winner/Immune: Jack Hoffman; Elimination Challenge: Jack gains immunity from the Elimination Challenge. The theme of the Elimination Challenge is the judges' childhood favorite meals. Jack is given the opportunity to choose what the rest of the contestants would have to cook. The eleven competing contestants are given an hour to create a restaurant-quality burger. The three best meals are Alexander's, Gavin's, and Kaylen's. The bottom three are Jewels', Molly's, and Tommy's.; Winners: Alexander Weiss, Gavin Pola and Kaylen Alfred; Bottom three: Jewels Gold, Molly Round and Tommy Peters; Eliminated: Molly Round and Tommy Peters
3	3	"Whip It"	October 11, 2013	3.92
Individual Challenge: Alexander, Gavin, and Kaylen are each given a quart of heavy cream and told to whip it to stiff peaks. Whoever had the thickest cream - measured by holding the bowl upside-down over one of the judges' heads - would get an advantage for the next team challenge. Alexander is judged the winner, after which he dumps the contents of his bowl over Graham's head anyway.; Challenge Winner: Alexander Weiss; Team Challenge: Alexander has the task of dividing the top ten into five groups of two; he selects Troy to join him, pairs Gavin with Sofia, Jack with Kaylen, Roen with Jewels, and Dara with Sarah. The task for this challenge is to recreate Gordon Ramsay's Beef Wellington, and have 65 minutes to complete it. Dara and Sarah are judged to have the best meal. The weakest two meals are those of Jack and Kaylen, and Jewels and Roen.; Winners: Dara Yu and Sarah Lane; Bottom four: Jack Hoffman, Jewels Gold, Kaylen Alfred and Roen Guerin; Eliminated: Jewels Gold and Roen Guerin
4	4	"Bad Food Bares"	October 18, 2013	3.96
Mystery Box Challenge: The mystery box consists of foods kids hate. The top three are Troy's, Alexander's, and Sarah's. Sarah wins the challenge.; Challenge Winner/Immune: Sarah Lane; Elimination Challenge: Sarah gains immunity from the Elimination Challenge. The theme of the Elimination Challenge is desserts. Sarah is able to choose what the rest of the contestants would have to cook. The rest of the competing contestants are given one and one-half hours to create a three-layer cake. The two best cakes are Dara's and Gavin's. The four worst cakes are Troy's, Alexander's, Kaylen's, and Sofia's.; Winners: Dara Yu and Gavin Pola; Bottom four: Alexander Weiss, Kaylen Alfred, Sofia Hublitz and Troy Glass; Eliminated: Kaylen Alfred and Sofia Hublitz
5	5	"Restaurant Takeovers"	October 25, 2013	3.87
Team Challenge: The contestants travel to Drago Centro in Los Angeles. Joe announces they will be competing in the restaurant takeover challenge. Dara and Gavin are named team captains. Dara chooses Alexander and Jack for her Red Team, while Gavin chooses Troy and Sarah for his Blue Team. The teams have to prepare two appetizers and entrees from the menu under Ramsay as expeditor. The teams have an hour of prep and 75 minutes of lunch service. Back in the MasterChef kitchen, the judges declare the Red Team the winner.; Team Challenge Winners: Alexander Weiss, Dara Yu and Jack Hoffman; Bottom three: Gavin Pola, Sarah Lane and Troy Glass; Eliminated: Gavin Pola and Sarah Lane
6	6	"Finale, Part 1"	November 1, 2013	4.01
Individual Challenge: All four remaining contestants are asked to make a perfect soft-boiled egg, but are refused any sort of timer. Troy's egg is named the winner.; Challenge Winner: Troy Glass; Elimination Challenge: Troy's advantage is to assign himself and the other cooks one of four cuts of chicken. He chooses thigh for himself, gives Alexander the liver, Dara the wings, and Jack the breast. Alexander is named the first finalist, leaving Dara, Jack, and Troy in the bottom three.; Winner: Alexander Weiss; Eliminated: Jack Hoffman and Troy Glass
7	7	"Finale, Part 2"	November 8, 2013	4.14
Season Finale: The two finalists each have one and one-half hours in which to make a three-course meal, and are allowed to cook anything they want.; Appetizer: Dara serves an Ahi tuna duo, while Alexander serves basil lemon shrimp with heirloom tomato crostini.; Entree: Dara's dish is fried spot prawns with scallop-shrimp wontons and Thai coconut curry sauce, and Alexander's is a pan-seared veal chop with potato gnocchi and butter sauce.; Dessert: Dara's is poached pears in lemon ginger miso sauce, while Alexander's is a deconstructed cannoli Napoleon.; Final Two: Alexander Weiss and Dara Yu; Winner Revealed: Alexander is announced as the first MasterChef Junior winner, taking home the trophy and the $100,000 prize, making Dara the runner-up.; MasterChef Junior Winner: Alexander Weiss
