= MasterChef Junior (American TV series) =

American competitive reality television series

- Genre: Cooking
- Based on: Junior MasterChef
- Written by: Robin Ashbrook
- Judges: Joe Bastianich; Graham Elliot; Gordon Ramsay; Christina Tosi; Aarón Sánchez; Daphne Oz; Tilly Ramsay
- No. of seasons: 9
- No. of episodes: 105

Production
- Executive producers: Ben Adler; Robin Ashbrook; Paul Franklin; Eden Gaha; Patricia Llewellyn; Elisabeth Murdoch; Adeline Ramage Rooney; Gordon Ramsay
- Production companies: One Potato Two Potato; Endemol Shine North America

Original release
- Network: Fox
- Release: September 27, 2013 – May 20, 2024

MasterChef Junior is an American cooking competition involving children from the ages of 8–13 that aired on Fox from September 27, 2013 to May 20, 2024. It is based on the format of the British series Junior MasterChef.

A ninth season was aired March–May 2024, with Gordon Ramsay, Aarón Sánchez, and Daphne Oz as returning judges, along with new judge Tilly Ramsay.

== Format ==
Any child between ages eight and thirteen can apply to become a contestant on the series by applying online or by going to an open casting call. The contestants are announced through a variety of methods over the years, sometimes via competitions, or sometimes the top contestants are simply announced.

As in its parent show MasterChef, the following challenges have all been regularly featured on the show:

- Skills Test: Cooks are challenged to prepare foods in accordance with a list of common cooking techniques or styles, or to replicate a particular cooking method of a dish (i.e. steaks done to an exact wellness). This type of test is also sometimes used as an Elimination Test.
- Mystery Box: Cooks are all given a box with the same ingredients and must use only those ingredients to create a dish within a fixed amount of time. The judges will select three dishes based on visual appearance and technique alone to taste, and from these three select one winner who usually gains an advantage of some type in the elimination test.
- Elimination Test: After the challenge is explained, judges evaluate all dishes based on taste and visual appeal. The judges nominate the worst dishes for elimination and criticize them before eliminating at least one contestant.
- Team Challenge: The cooks are split into teams by either team captains or the judges. They often occur in a restaurant takeover or pop-up restaurant taking the place of the staff of a particular restaurant. Diners taste both meals and vote for their favorite. The winning team advances, while the losing team will participate in the Pressure Test or even face elimination based on team members' performance.
- Pressure Test: Another form of the Elimination Test, in which losing team members compete against each other to make a standard dish within a very limited amount of time that requires a great degree of cooking finesse. Each dish is judged on taste, visual appeal and technique, and the losing chef is eliminated.

Once the competition is reduced to either the final two or three competitors, the finalists will compete against each other in a three-course cook-off. All courses of the meal are judged and an overall winner is crowned. The winner of each season wins $100,000, the MasterChef Junior trophy, and the title of MasterChef Junior. Some seasons have also added other prizes.

== Judges ==
Season	Judge 1	Judge 2	Judge 3	Judge 4
1	Gordon Ramsay	Graham Elliot	Joe Bastianich	—N/a
2	Gordon Ramsay	Graham Elliot	Joe Bastianich	—N/a
3	Gordon Ramsay	Graham Elliot	Joe Bastianich	—N/a
4	Gordon Ramsay	Graham Elliot	Christina Tosi	—N/a
5	Gordon Ramsay	Guest judges	Christina Tosi	—N/a
6	Gordon Ramsay	Joe Bastianich	Christina Tosi	—N/a
7	Gordon Ramsay	Aarón Sánchez	Christina Tosi	—N/a
8	Gordon Ramsay	Aarón Sánchez	Daphne Oz	—N/a
9	Gordon Ramsay	Aarón Sánchez	Daphne Oz	Tilly Ramsay

== Series overview ==
Season	Contestants	Episodes	Originally released		Winner	Runner(s)-up
Season	Contestants	Episodes	First released	Last released	Winner	Runner(s)-up
1	12	7	September 27, 2013	November 8, 2013	Alexander Weiss	Dara Yu
2	16	7	November 4, 2014	December 16, 2014	Logan Guleff	Samuel Stromberg
3	19	8	January 6, 2015	February 24, 2015	Nathan Odom	Andrew Zappley
4	24	12	November 6, 2015	January 29, 2016	Addison Osta Smith	Avery Kyle
5	20	15	February 9, 2017	May 18, 2017	Jasmine Stewart	Justise Mayberry
6	24	15	March 2, 2018	May 18, 2018	Beni Cwiakala	Avery Meadows & Quani Fields
7	24	15	March 12, 2019	June 4, 2019	Che Spiotta	Ivy Angst & Malia Brauer
8	16	16	March 17, 2022	June 23, 2022	Liya Chu	Grayson Price
9	12	10	March 4, 2024	May 20, 2024	Bryson McGlynn	Michael Seegobin & Remy Powell

=== Specials ===
No.	Title	Original release date	Prod. code	U.S. viewers (millions)
1	"An Extra Serving"	April 27, 2017	SP-1721	2.65
Gordon Ramsay recaps the events of the past five seasons; moments from past seasons, as well as never-before-seen bloopers, were shown; contestants from seasons 1–3 talked about the events in the years since they competed; Ramsay talks with the previous winners.
2	"The Road to the Finale"	May 15, 2018	SP-1820	1.74
Gordon Ramsay takes a look back at the events of season 6 along with some clips and bloopers, and shows some of the audition videos submitted for the show. The three finalists challenge Ramsay to cook their three favorite dishes in 30 minutes while they force him to switch from one dish to another. In the end, the kids playfully "eliminate" Ramsay.
3	"Celebrity Showdown"	November 22, 2018	SP-1906	5.31
This two-hour special is hosted by Gordon Ramsay and Aarón Sánchez and teams celebrities up with past contestants and other kids in competitions. The first battle is between Eric Stonestreet and season 5 contestant Shayne Wells against Terrence Howard and season 6 finalist Avery Meadows in a Mystery Box challenge where they have one hour to cook a meal featuring nuts. Terrance and Avery win the challenge. The second battle is between Alyson Hannigan and her nine-year-old daughter Saty against Lil Rel Howery and his nine-year-old daughter Brittni where the teams must replicate a party platter of appetizers in one hour, and it will be a tag team battle where the parents first cook for twenty minutes, the kids then cook for twenty minutes, and then they cook together for twenty minutes. Alyson and Saty win the challenge. The third battle is between Emmitt Smith and season 6 winner Beni Cwiakala against Jerry Rice and season 4 winner Addison Osta Smith where the teams must cook a meal for a group of military members, doctors, nurses, and first responders in 60 minutes. Aarón joins up with Emmett and Beni while Gordon joins up with Jerry and Addison, while the judges will be the diners themselves and Lidia Bastianich. Emmett, Beni and Aarón win this challenge. All winning celebrities received $25,000 for their favorite charity, while the other celebrities received $15,000 for their charity.
4	"Junior Edition: The Road to the Finale (Season 7)"	May 28, 2019	SP-1918	1.94
Much like the Season 6 special, Gordon Ramsay takes a look back at the events of season 7 along with some clips and bloopers, and shows some of the audition videos submitted for the show. The three finalists get dedicated segments on their respective backgrounds, and Ramsay gets to dump cream and cocoa on them.
5	"Junior Edition: The Road to the Finale (Season 8)"	June 23, 2022	SP-2220	1.70
Ramsay and Sánchez take a look back at the highlights of the season, including a countdown of the best bloopers of the year.
6	"Home for the Holidays – Let It Snow!/The Pies the Limit!"	December 10, 2023	SP-2406/2407	1.31
"Let It Snow!": Gordon Ramsay, Aarón Sanchez, Daphne Oz and Tilly Ramsay welcome the nine contestants to this competition. The contestants are: Colbie Buck, age 10, from Bellingham, WA; Elijah Zelaya, age 9, from Ellicott City, MD; Emerson Pauley, age 9, from Cary, NC; Landon Brown, age 9, from Jacksonville, FL; Lorenzo Ramos, age 11, from Miami, FL; Mina Cole, age 8, from Spring, TX; Rae Barker, age 11, from Oakville, TX; Xiaowan Jin, age 8, from Chino Hills, CA; Zarah Spriggs, age 9, from Upper Marlboro, MD; Source for all first names, ages and hometown: The winner of this holiday competition wins $25,000 and a special holiday-themed trophy. For the first challenge, the contestants must cook their favorite holiday meal in 60 minutes, and they find their proteins hidden inside of snowmen. The bottom three contestants will be sent home, while the winning chef gets a set of kitchen tools and bakeware from OXO. Colbie wins, while Emerson, Mina and Zarah are eliminated. "The Pies the Limit!": The six contestants are divided into teams by picking pies, with the color of the fillings designating their team. Lorenzo and Colbie are the Red Team, Elijah and Xiaowan are the Blue Team, Rae and Landon are the Green Team. The teams must race to make the most number of pies correctly in twenty minutes, after being given a demonstration by Daphne. The winning team moves on to the final four and gets a surprise, while the other teams must compete in an elimination challenge. The Green Team wins the challenge and gets to shove a cake or pie into a judge's face. The remaining four contestants must bake a savory pie in one hour with the winner also getting a set of cookware and bakeware from Staub and the bottom two contestants being eliminated. Elijah wins, while Lorenzo and Xiaowan are eliminated.
7	"Home for the Holidays - Ghosts of Holiday Presents / Finale Feast"	December 11, 2023	SP-2408/2409	1.3
"Ghosts of Holiday Presents": Aarón places wrapped presents of mystery boxes of assorted Mexican cuisine ingredients for the contestants to use. The contestants have one hour to cook a dish with their chosen box of ingredients, and the winning chef moves on to the finals and wins an all-inclusive trip to Mexico with their family, while the bottom chef will be eliminated. Halfway in the cooking time, Joe Bastianich arrives with chocolate chips and the contestants must also make cookies in addition to their Mexican-themed dish. Rae wins the challenge, while Landon is eliminated. "Finale Feast": The three finalists (Colbie, Elijah and Rae) must make a holiday snack and a restaurant-quality entrée. They have 30 minutes to make their snack. MasterChef season 12 winner Dara Yu joins the entrée round and she will help each contestant once for two minutes. The contestants have 60 minutes to cook their entrées. Rae wins the competition.

== Development ==
=== Casting ===
Like its adult counterpart, at its inception MasterChef Junior was judged by Gordon Ramsay, Joe Bastianich and Graham Elliot. Bastianich did not return for the show's fourth season, being replaced by prominent pastry chef Christina Tosi. Elliot did not return for the show's fifth season, and a series of rotating guest judges served for the third judge. For the sixth season, Bastianich returned to his judging position. In the seventh season, Bastianich left again and was replaced by Aarón Sánchez, who was one of the guest judges in season 5 as well as a judge on the adult MasterChef.

=== Production ===
Fox placed casting calls for participants in January 2013. Fox officially ordered the series (then under the name Junior MasterChef) on May 10, 2013. The name was later changed to MasterChef Junior. There were concerns that Ramsay's style of cursing at the contestants on his other competition shows (most notably Hell's Kitchen and the adult MasterChef) would carry over to MasterChef Junior. It did not. One contestant (Gavin) said that Ramsay had only cursed twice during the production of the series and never at the contestants. In the final editing, he cursed once in front of (but not at) the contestants.

== Season synopsis ==
=== Season 1 (2013) ===
The first season premiered on September 27, 2013, with chefs Gordon Ramsay, Graham Elliot and Joe Bastianich acting as the judges.

The winner of MasterChef Junior season 1 was Alexander Weiss, a thirteen-year-old from New York City.

Semifinalist Troy Glass is now an actor, appearing on Kids React and other cooking shows, and making cameos on shows like Agents of S.H.I.E.L.D.

=== Season 2 (2014) ===
The second season premiered on November 4, 2014, with chefs Gordon Ramsay, Graham Elliot and Joe Bastianich again acting as the judges.

The winner of MasterChef Junior season 2 was Logan Guleff, an eleven-year-old from Memphis, Tennessee.

=== Season 3 (2015) ===
On March 5, 2014, MasterChef Junior was renewed for a third season before production on season two began. The third season premiered on January 6, 2015, with chefs Gordon Ramsay, Graham Elliot and Joe Bastianich once again acting as the judges.

The winner of MasterChef Junior season 3 was Nathan Odom, a twelve-year-old from San Diego, California.

=== Season 4 (2015–16) ===
The fourth season premiered on November 6, 2015, with chefs Gordon Ramsay, Graham Elliot and Christina Tosi acting as the judges.

The winner of MasterChef Junior season 4 was Addison Smith, a nine-year-old from River Forest, Illinois.

=== Season 5 (2017) ===
The fifth season premiered on February 9, 2017, with chefs Gordon Ramsay and Christina Tosi acting as the judges, along with numerous guest judges including Julie Bowen and Mayim Bialik.

The winner of MasterChef Junior season 5 was Jasmine Stewart, an eleven-year-old from Milton, Georgia. She is the first previously eliminated contestant to win the competition.

=== Season 6 (2018) ===
The sixth season premiered on March 2, 2018, with returning chefs Gordon Ramsay and Christina Tosi acting as the judges, along with returning judge Joe Bastianich as the third judge.

The winner of MasterChef Junior season 6 was Beni Cwiakala, a nine-year-old from Chicago, Illinois.

=== Season 7 (2019) ===
On February 13, 2019, it was announced that the seventh season would premiere with a two-episode special on March 12, 2019, with Gordon Ramsay, Christina Tosi, and Aarón Sánchez serving as the judges.

The winner of MasterChef Junior season 7 was Che Spiotta, a twelve-year-old from Boiceville, New York.

=== Season 8 (2022) ===
In July 2019, it was announced that the show would be returning for an eighth season, with Ramsay and Sánchez as returning judges, along with new judge Daphne Oz replacing Tosi. The season premiered on March 17, 2022.

The winner of MasterChef Junior season 8 was Liya Chu, a ten-year-old from Scarsdale, New York.

=== Season 9 (2024) ===
On December 20, 2022, the initial casting announcement for a potential ninth season was posted. The casting notice was re-posted on September 8, 2023, on the show's Twitter page. On October 12, 2023, it was announced that the series had been renewed for a ninth season, with Ramsay, Sánchez, and Oz as returning judges, along with new judge Tilly Ramsay. On December 13, 2023, it was announced that the season would premiere on March 4, 2024. On February 21, 2024, the 12 new contestants were announced.

The winner of MasterChef Junior season 9 was Bryson McGlynn, an 11-year-old from Opelika, Alabama.

== Television ratings ==
Seasonal rankings (based on average total viewers per episode) of MasterChef Junior on Fox.

Each American network TV season starts in late September and ends in late May, which coincides with the completion of May sweeps.

U.S. television ratings for MasterChef Junior
Season	Timeslot (ET)	Episodes	Premiere		Finale		TV Season	Season ranking	Season viewers
Season	Timeslot (ET)	Episodes	Date	Viewers (millions)	Date	Viewers (millions)	TV Season	Season ranking	Season viewers
1	Friday 8:00 PM	7	September 27, 2013	4.29	November 8, 2013	4.14	2013–14	83	5.56
2	Tuesday 8:00 PM	7	November 4, 2014	5.09	December 16, 2014	5.66	2014–15	89	6.30
3	Tuesday 8:00 PM	8	January 6, 2015	5.33	February 24, 2015	4.83	2014–15	89	6.30
4	Friday 8:00 PM	12	November 6, 2015	4.16	January 29, 2016	4.75	2015–16	81	5.67
5	Thursday 8:00 PM	15	February 9, 2017	4.21	May 18, 2017	3.52	2016–17	97	4.57
6	Friday 8:00 PM	15	March 2, 2018	3.40	May 18, 2018	3.32	2017–18	114	4.33
7	Tuesday 8:00 PM	15	March 12, 2019	2.82	June 4, 2019	3.27	2018–19	124	3.69
8	Thursday 8:00 PM (1–12, 15); Thursday 9:00 PM (13, 16); Tuesday 9:00 PM (14)	16	March 17, 2022	2.07	June 23, 2022	2.22	2021–22	TBA	TBA
9	Monday 8:00 PM	10	March 4, 2024	1.61	May 20, 2024	1.49	2023–24	TBA	TBA

== See also ==
- MasterChef (British TV series)
- MasterChef (American TV series)
