= MasterChef Junior (American TV series) season 7 =

Season of television series

MasterChef Junior
- Season 7
- Promotional poster for season 7, featuring (L to R) judges Gordon Ramsay, Aarón Sanchez, and Christina Tosi
- Judges: Gordon Ramsay; Christina Tosi; Aarón Sanchez
- No. of contestants: 24
- Winner: Che Spiotta
- Runners-up: Ivy Angst; Malia Brauer
- No. of episodes: 15

Release
- Original network: Fox
- Original release: March 12 – June 4, 2019

Season chronology
- ← Previous; Season 6 Next → Season 8

The seventh season of the American competitive reality television series MasterChef Junior premiered on Fox on March 12, 2019, and concluded on June 4, 2019. The season is hosted by regular judges Gordon Ramsay and Christina Tosi, while Aarón Sanchez joins the judges this season.

The winner was Che Spiotta, a 12-year-old from Boiceville, New York, with Ivy Angst from Atlanta, Georgia and Malia Brauer from Newhall, Santa Clarita, California being the runners-up.

== Top 24 ==
Source for first names, ages, and hometowns:

Contestant	Age	Hometown	Status
Che Spiotta	12	Boiceville, New York	Winner June 4
Ivy Angst	11	Atlanta, Georgia	Runners-Up June 4
Malia Brauer	11	Newhall, Santa Clarita, California	Runners-Up June 4
Aaron Smith	10	Powder Springs, Georgia	Eliminated May 28
Reid Briggs	8	Newnan, Georgia	Eliminated May 28
Sadie Suskind	12	Seattle, Washington	Eliminated May 28
Jaala Smith	10	Pawtucket, Rhode Island	Eliminated May 14
Matthew Smith	8	Livingston, New Jersey	Eliminated May 14
Ben Brown	11	Morristown, New Jersey	Eliminated May 7
Rhashad Lawery	12	Milton, Georgia	Eliminated May 7
Brielle Jones	8	Conley, Georgia	Eliminated April 23
Kyle Sisitsky	11	Rye, New York	Eliminated April 23
Evie Babcock	11	Atlanta, Georgia	Eliminated April 16
Kate Hendon	8	Roanoke, Alabama	Eliminated April 16
Jayden Ingalls	12	San Antonio, Texas	Eliminated April 2
Nayeli Mendoza	9	San Antonio, Texas	Eliminated April 2
Mateo Sugarman	8	Demarest, New Jersey	Eliminated March 26
Talulah	11	New York, New York	Eliminated March 26
Ashley Johnson	9	Queens, New York	Eliminated March 19
Tal Schulmiller	13	Port Washington, New York	Eliminated March 19
Shannen Hosman	9	Scarsdale, New York	Eliminated March 12
Thomas Reyna	12	Boerne, Texas	Eliminated March 12
Miguel Jaramillo	12	Atlanta, Georgia	Eliminated March 12
Neko Masi	11	San Antonio, Texas	Eliminated March 12

Note: It is Fox's policy to not publish the last names of minor contestants. Any last name not listed has not been properly cited/sourced at this time.

== Elimination table ==
Place	Contestant	Episode																						
Place	Contestant	1		2		3	4		5		6		7	8		9		10	11		12	13		14/15
1	Che	IN	IN	IMM	IMM	NPT	IN	IMM	LOW	LOW	IN	IN	WIN	HIGH	IN	LOW	IN	WIN	WIN	IN	WIN	WIN	IMM	WINNER
2	Ivy	WIN	IMM	IMM	IMM	NPT	IN	IMM	WIN	IMM	IN	IN	PT	IN	IN	IMM	IMM	WIN	HIGH	WIN	WIN	IN	WIN	RUNNERS-UP
2	Malia	IN	IN	LOW	WIN	NPT	IN	HIGH	LOW	IN	IN	WIN	WIN	IN	WIN	WIN	IMM	WIN	IN	LOW	WIN	IN	WIN	RUNNERS-UP
4	Aaron	IN	IN	IMM	IMM	PT	IN	IN	LOW	IN	IN	IN	WIN	IN	IMM	LOW	IN	LOW	IN	IN	WIN	IN	ELIM	
4	Reid	IN	IN	IMM	IMM	WIN	HIGH	IN	LOW	IN	IN	IN	WIN	WIN	IMM	WIN	IMM	WIN	IN	WIN	WIN	IN	ELIM	
4	Sadie	WIN	IMM	LOW	HIGH	WIN	IN	IN	WIN	IMM	IN	IN	WIN	IN	IN	LOW	IN	WIN	IN	LOW	WIN	IN	ELIM	
7	Jaala	IN	IN	IMM	IMM	LOW	IN	IN	LOW	IN	HIGH	WIN	WIN	HIGH	IN	WIN	IMM	WIN	IN	ELIM				
7	Matthew	IN	IN	WIN	IMM	WIN	WIN	IMM	IMM	IMM	IN	IN	PT	IN	IN	LOW	LOW	PT	HIGH	ELIM				
9	Ben	WIN	IMM	WIN	IMM	WIN	IN	HIGH	LOW	WIN	IN	IN	LOW	IN	LOW	LOW	LOW	ELIM						
9	Rhashad	IN	LOW	LOW	IN	WIN	IN	IMM	WIN	IMM	HIGH	IN	PT	IN	IN	LOW	LOW	ELIM						
11	Brielle	IN	IN	LOW	LOW	WIN	HIGH	LOW	WIN	IMM	IN	IN	WIN	IN	ELIM									
11	Kyle	IN	IN	LOW	LOW	WIN	IN	LOW	WIN	IMM	IN	IN	WIN	IN	ELIM									
13	Evie	IN	WIN	IMM	IMM	WIN	IN	IMM	LOW	IN	WIN	IN	ELIM											
13	Kate	IN	IN	IMM	IMM	PT	IN	IN	LOW	IN	IN	IN	ELIM											
15	Jayden	IN	IN	LOW	IN	WIN	IN	IMM	LOW	ELIM														
15	Nayeli	IN	IN	IMM	IMM	WIN	IN	HIGH	LOW	ELIM														
17	Mateo	IN	IN	IMM	IMM	PT	IN	ELIM																
17	Talulah	IN	WIN	IMM	IMM	WIN	IN	ELIM																
19	Ashley	IN	IN	WIN	IMM	ELIM																		
19	Tal	IN	IN	WIN	IMM	ELIM																		
21	Shannen	IN	IN	LOW	ELIM																			
21	Thomas	IN	WIN	LOW	ELIM																			
23	Miguel	IN	ELIM																					
23	Neko	IN	ELIM																					

(WINNER) This cook won the competition.
(RUNNERS-UP) These cooks finished in second place.
(WIN) The cook won an individual challenge (Mystery Box Challenge, Elimination Test, Pressure Test, or Skills Challenge).
(WIN) The cook was on the winning team in the Team Challenge and directly advanced to the next round.
(HIGH) The cook was one of the top entries in the individual challenge but didn't win.
(IN) The cook was not selected as a top or bottom entry in an individual challenge.
(IN) The cook was not selected as a top or bottom entry in a Team Challenge.
(IMM) The cook did not have to compete in that round of the competition and was safe from elimination.
(IMM) The cook was selected by the Mystery Box Challenge winner and didn't have to compete in the Elimination Test.
(LOW) The cook was one of the bottom entries in an individual challenge or Pressure Test, and advanced.
(LOW) The cook was one of the bottom entries in a Team Challenge, and they advanced.
(PT) The cook was on the losing team in the Team Challenge, competed in the Pressure Test, and advanced.
(NPT) The cook was on the losing team in the Team Challenge, but did not compete in the Pressure Test, and advanced.
(ELIM) The cook was eliminated.

== Episodes ==
No. overall	No. in season	Title	Original release date	U.S. viewers (millions)
65	1	"New Kids on the Block"	March 12, 2019	2.82
Mystery Box Challenge: The contestants are given their MasterChef aprons and are challenged to make a breakfast dish in 45 minutes. Ben, Ivy, and Sadie have the top three dishes; all of them win the challenge and are safe from elimination.; Challenge Winners/Immune: Ben Brown, Ivy Angst and Sadie Suskind; Elimination Challenge: The remaining kids have one hour to make one of three school lunches, with the winners choosing who has to cook which dish. Evie, Talulah, and Thomas have the best three dishes, while Kyle, Mateo, Miguel, Neko, Rhashad and Shannen are called up. Miguel, Neko, and Rhashad end up in the bottom.; Winners: Evie Babcock, Talulah and Thomas Reyna; Bottom three: Miguel Jaramillo, Neko Masi and Rhashad Lawery; The judges save Rhashad, sending Miguel and Neko home.; Eliminated: Miguel Jaramillo and Neko Masi
66	2	"Going Bananas"	March 12, 2019	2.56
Team Challenge: The contestants randomly draw bananas with colored stickers on them to assign teams. The Yellow Team is Tal, Matthew, Ashley and Ben; the Pink Team is Jayden, Sadie, Malia and Brielle; and the Green Team is Shannen, Rhashad, Kyle and Thomas. All other contestants do not have to compete and are safe for the rest of the day. Each team must assemble as many perfect banana splits as possible in 15 minutes while having their feet tied together. The Yellow Team wins the challenge and are safe in the next round, while all the teams get to pour banana split toppings on the judges.; Immune: Aaron Smith, Che Spiotta, Evie Babcock, Ivy Angst, Jaala Smith, Kate Hendon, Mateo Sugarman, Nayeli Mendoza, Reid Briggs and Talulah; Challenge Winners/Immune: Ashley Johnson, Ben Brown, Matthew Smith and Tal Schulmiller; Elimination Challenge: The other two teams must make a dish within 60 minutes featuring live lobster that they must kill and cook. The best dish belonged to Malia, and the second best to Sadie, while Thomas, Brielle, Shannen and Kyle are called out in the bottom.; Challenge Winner: Malia Brauer; Bottom four: Brielle Jones, Kyle Sisitsky, Shannen Hosman and Thomas Reyna; The judges save Brielle and Kyle, eliminating Shannen and Thomas.; Eliminated: Shannen Hosman and Thomas Reyna
67	3	"Under the Big Top"	March 19, 2019	2.79
Team Challenge: The kids are taken to a circus where they are randomly split into teams. Che is captain of the Red Team along with Aaron, Ashley, Ivy, Jaala, Kate, Malia, Mateo, Sadie and Tal; Evie is the captain of the Blue Team along with Ben, Brielle, Jayden, Kyle, Matthew, Nayeli, Reid, Rhashad and Talulah. The teams must cook a lunch for 51 circus performers. They have 45 minutes to prep and 60 minutes to serve the meals. The Blue Team wins the challenge.; Challenge Winners/Immune: Ben Brown, Brielle Jones, Evie Babcock, Jayden Ingalls, Kyle Sisitsky, Matthew Smith, Nayeli Mendoza, Reid Briggs, Rhashad Lawery and Talulah.; Pressure Test: Che, Ivy and Malia are declared exempt from the Pressure Test for doing well in the team challenge. The other Red Team members must make their best birthday cake. Sadie makes the best cake, while Kate, Mateo and Aaron are also all safe, leaving Ashley, Jaala and Tal in the bottom.; Immune: Che Spiotta, Ivy Angst and Malia Brauer; Challenge Winner: Sadie Suskind; Bottom three: Ashley Johnson, Jaala Smith and Tal Schulmiller; Jaala is saved, thus sending Ashley and Tal home.; Eliminated: Ashley Johnson and Tal Schulmiller
68	4	"Off the Hook"	March 26, 2019	2.75
Mystery Box Challenge: The contestants have 60 minutes to make their best fish dish. Matthew, Brielle and Reid are called up for the best dishes, with Matthew announced as the winner.; Challenge Winner/Immune: Matthew Smith; Elimination Challenge: Matthew gets to choose which of three ingredients the remaining contestants must make their next dish with, and he chooses citrus fruits. He also gets to save five contestants from the challenge; he saves Rhashad, Che, Ivy, Jayden and Evie. The remaining contestants have 60 minutes to make their dish. Malia, Nayeli and Ben were all praised for their dishes, while Mateo, Brielle, Kyle and Talulah are called out as the bottom four.; Immune: Che Spiotta, Evie Babcock, Ivy Angst, Jayden Ingalls and Rhashad Lawery; Bottom four: Brielle Jones, Kyle Sisitsky, Mateo Sugarman and Talulah; Kyle and Brielle are both safe, sending Mateo and Talulah home.; Eliminated: Mateo Sugarman and Talulah
69	5	"Something to Trifle With"	April 2, 2019	2.74
Team Challenge: The contestants will be divided into three teams of five each, and each team must make as many perfect trifles as they can in 20 minutes. The kids must dig through an over-sized trifle to find tokens which will assign them their teams. Matthew finds the gold token, which makes him immune from all challenges for the day. The Red Team consists of Kyle, Brielle, Sadie, Ivy and Rhashad; the Yellow Team has Aaron, Malia, Kate, Jayden and Nayeli; and the Green Team is Reid, Ben, Che, Evie and Jaala. The losing teams will have pudding poured on them to indicate that they have not won. The Red Team wins the challenge, and all teams have pudding dumped on them for fun.; Immune: Matthew Smith; Challenge Winners/Immune: Brielle Jones, Ivy Angst, Kyle Sisitsky, Rhashad Lawery and Sadie Suskind; Elimination Challenge: The remaining contestants will have 60 minutes to make three of their best sliders. Ben makes the best dish of the challenge, while Jayden, Nayeli and Che are called out in the bottom.; Challenge Winner: Ben Brown; Bottom three: Che Spiotta, Jayden Ingalls and Nayeli Mendoza; Che is saved, sending Jayden and Nayeli home.; Eliminated: Jayden Ingalls and Nayeli Mendoza
70	6	"Quacking Under Pressure"	April 9, 2019	2.65
Mystery Box Challenge: After showing how to break down a duck by Aarón, the contestants have one hour to break down their own duck and cook one duck dish. Jaala, Rhashad, and Evie have the best three duck dishes, with Evie as the winner. Afterwards, the kids enjoy cupcakes on the patio.; Challenge Winner: Evie Babcock; Elimination Challenge: All contestants will have to work in pairs with Evie choosing the pairs. Each team has to make a dozen cupcakes, and the winning pair will have their recipe published in the all-new "MasterChef Junior Cookbook." Evie chooses Sadie as her teammate, then she pairs Brielle with Ben, Malia with Jaala, Matthew with Ivy, Rhashad with Reid, Kyle with Che, and Kate with Aaron. Jaala and Malia are the winners of this challenge.; Challenge Winners: Jaala Smith and Malia Brauer; The judges decide not to eliminate anyone, as all pairs performed well.; Eliminated: None
71	7	"Camp MasterChef"	April 16, 2019	2.49
Team Challenge: The contestants are taken to a MasterChef Junior kids campsite, where they will cook lunch for 51 campers. Jaala and Malia are the team captains because they won the last challenge. Jaala captains the Red Team of Aaron, Che, Kyle, Sadie, Brielle and Reid, while Malia captains the Blue Team of Evie, Rhashad, Ivy, Ben, Matthew and Kate. The winning team will be safe and have their recipe published in Family Circle magazine. The Red Team wins the challenge.; Challenge Winners/Immune: Aaron Smith, Brielle Jones, Che Spiotta, Jaala Smith, Kyle Sisitsky, Reid Briggs and Sadie Suskind; Pressure Test: The Blue Team members must make a chocolate coconut cream pie. Malia wins this challenge, while Ben, Kate and Evie are called out as the bottom.; Challenge Winner: Malia Brauer; Bottom three: Ben Brown, Evie and Kate Hendon; Ben is saved, sending Kate and Evie home.; Eliminated: Evie Babcock and Kate Hendon
72	8	"Kidz Bop Kitchen"	April 23, 2019	2.97
Mystery Box Challenge: The Mystery Box ingredients have been chosen by members of Kidz Bop, who have been invited to watch this contest. The contestants have one hour to make their best dish using any of the ingredients in the box. The top three dishes belong to Jaala, Reid and Che, and Reid wins the challenge.; Challenge Winner/Immune: Reid Briggs; Elimination Challenge: Reid gets to choose one contestant to be safe in this round, and he chooses Aaron. Reid gets to choose the ingredient the remaining contestants must make their dishes with, based on dishes the judges loved as a child. The choices are cereal, cheese, and canned tuna, and Reid chooses canned tuna. Malia makes the best dish of the night, while Kyle, Brielle and Ben are called out in the bottom.; Immune: Aaron Smith; Challenge Winner: Malia Brauer; Bottom three: Ben Brown, Brielle Jones and Kyle Sisitsky; Brielle and Kyle are both eliminated.; Eliminated: Brielle Jones and Kyle Sisitsky
73	9	"Pasta Race"	April 30, 2019	2.86
Team Challenge: The kids are split into three teams of three contestants. They randomly draw colored pasta to assign teams. Ivy draws the black pasta and is immune for the day. The Green Team is Malia, Jaala and Reid; the Yellow Team is Matthew, Rhashad and Che; the Red Team is Aaron, Ben and Sadie. Each team is in a race to roll out a single pasta sheet that is 24 feet long. The winning team wins immunity and gets to dump a large bowl of pasta sauce on their assigned judge. The Green Team wins the challenge, and eventually all the judges have sauce poured on them.; Immune: Ivy Angst; Challenge Winners/Immune: Jaala Smith, Malia Brauer and Reid Briggs; Elimination Challenge: The remaining contestants must make three different types of éclairs. Matthew, Rhashad and Ben are left as the bottom three.; Bottom three: Ben Brown, Matthew Smith and Rhashad Lawery; The judges decide to not send anyone home this week. In addition, all remaining contestants are invited to take part in next summer's MasterChef Junior summer camp.; Eliminated: None
74	10	"Girl Power"	May 7, 2019	2.88
Team Challenge: The kids are split into teams with contestants that have never been captain before. Ivy captains the Blue team and wins a coin toss, allowing her to choose her entire team at once; she picks Malia, Reid, Che and Sadie; Rhashad captains the Red Team with Aaron, Ben, Jaala and Matthew. Both teams will be cooking meals for guests of the MasterChef Junior restaurant who are all women, including former MasterChef and MasterChef Junior winners. The Blue Team wins the challenge.; Challenge Winners/Immune: Che Spiotta, Ivy Angst, Malia Brauer, Reid Briggs and Sadie Suskind; Pressure Test: The Red Team members must replicate Gordon's signature scallop dish after he demonstrates how to make it. Jaala wins the Pressure Test, while Rhashad, Ben and Aaron are left in the bottom.; Challenge Winner: Jaala Smith; Bottom three: Aaron Smith, Ben Brown and Rhashad Lawery; Aaron is saved, sending Ben and Rhashad home.; Eliminated: Ben Brown and Rhashad Lawery
75	11	"Too Corny"	May 14, 2019	2.84
Mystery Box Challenge: After being showered with corn, the kids must make a dish featuring different types of corn in 60 minutes. The top three dishes belong to Che, Matthew and Ivy, and Che wins the challenge.; Challenge Winner: Che Spiotta; Team Challenge: Che gets to choose the contestants to pair up in the annual tag team challenge. Che teams with Aaron, Ivy teams with Reid, Jaala teams with Matthew, and Malia teams with Sadie. All teams must make a platter of six different tapas in one hour, with the contestants switching out every ten minutes, and both members of the losing team will be eliminated. The winning team is Reid and Ivy. Jaala, Matthew, Malia and Sadie are the teams in the bottom.; Challenge Winners: Ivy Angst and Reid Briggs; Bottom four: Jaala Smith, Matthew Smith, Malia Brauer and Sadie Suskind; The team of Malia and Sadie are saved, sending Jaala and Matthew home.; Eliminated: Jaala Smith and Matthew Smith
76	12	"The Restaurant Takeover"	May 21, 2019	2.92
Team Challenge: The contestants travel to a restaurant named Mélisse, with the judges assigning the teams. Reid captains the Blue Team along with Che and Ivy; Sadie captains the Red Team along with Aaron and Malia. The teams have to prepare two appetizers and entrées from the menu under Ramsay as expeditor. Back in the MasterChef kitchen, it is revealed that both teams are the winner, and nobody is going home.; Challenge Winners: Aaron Smith, Che Spiotta, Ivy Angst, Malia Brauer, Reid Briggs and Sadie Suskind; Eliminated: None
77	13	"The Semi-Final"	May 28, 2019	3.01
Mystery Box Challenge: In this last Mystery Box challenge, the kids receive letters of encouragement from their families, and they must make a dish based on their families in one hour. They are then greeted by their families. The winner will advance through to the finale. All the dishes are judged and Che wins the challenge.; Challenge Winner/Immune/Finalist: Che Spiotta; Elimination Challenge: After the families leave, Che is given five fruits and gets to assign one to each contestant. He assigns cherries to Aaron, mango to Reid, pineapple to Sadie, pear to Ivy and peach to Malia. The contestants must make a dish in 60 minutes using their fruit.; Bottom five: Aaron Smith, Ivy Angst, Malia Brauer, Reid Briggs and Sadie Suskind; Ivy and Malia advance to the finals, eliminating Aaron, Reid and Sadie.; Eliminated: Aaron Smith, Reid Briggs and Sadie Suskind; Finalists: Ivy Angst and Malia Brauer
78	14	"The Finale, Part 1"	June 4, 2019	2.97
Season Finale: The three finalists must prepare their best appetizer, entrée, and dessert. They will have 60 minutes to prepare each course and will be judged at the end of each course.; Appetizer: Malia serves miso-marinated black cod, fresh soba noodles with pickled cucumber and a soy quail egg. Che serves pan-seared prawns and cuttlefish, Calabrian chile butter polenta with lemon vinaigrette and Parmesan crisp. Ivy serves pan-seared red snapper, tropical salsa, avocado crema and tostones.; The entrées begin cooking as the episode ends.
79	15	"The Finale, Part 2"	June 4, 2019	3.27
Entrée: Malia serves pan-seared filet mignon, fried shishito peppers and dashi-braised daikon. Che serves veal saltimbocca, fingerling potatoes, spring pea ragout with morels and mushroom jus. Ivy serves glazed hanger steak, butternut squash two ways, Brussels sprouts and herb purée.; Dessert: Malia serves black sesame panna cotta, mixed berry coulis with raspberry cream and sesame tuile. Che serves gluten-free chocolate olive oil cake, orange glaze with fresh ricotta cream and pistachio tuile. Ivy serves butterscotch pots de creme with caramel sauce, pine nut brittle and whipped creme fraíche.; Final three: Che Spiotta, Ivy Angst and Malia Brauer; Winner Announced: Che is announced as this season's winner of MasterChef Junior, taking home the trophy and the $100,000 prize.; MasterChef Junior Winner: Che Spiotta
