= MasterChef Junior (American TV series) season 4 =

Season of television series

MasterChef Junior
- Season 4
- Promotional poster for season 4, featuring (1st row, L to R) judges Graham Elliot, Gordon Ramsay, and Christina Tosi
- Judges: Graham Elliot; Gordon Ramsay; Christina Tosi
- No. of contestants: 24
- Winner: Addison Osta Smith
- Runner-up: Avery Kyle
- No. of episodes: 12

Release
- Original network: Fox
- Original release: November 6, 2015 – January 29, 2016

Season chronology
- ← Previous; Season 3 Next → Season 5

The fourth season of the American competitive reality television series MasterChef Junior premiered on Fox on November 6, 2015, and concluded on January 29, 2016. Gordon Ramsay and Graham Elliot returned as judges. Christina Tosi replaced Joe Bastianich as the third judge.

The winner was Addison Osta Smith, a 9-year-old from River Forest, Illinois, with Avery Kyle from Baton Rouge, Louisiana being the runner-up.

== Top 24 ==
Source for all first names, ages, and hometowns

Contestant	Age	Hometown	Status
Addison Osta Smith	9	River Forest, Illinois	Winner January 29
Avery Kyle	9	Baton Rouge, Louisiana	Runner-Up January 29
Amaya Báez	10	Bergenfield, New Jersey	Eliminated January 22
Zac Kara	12	Orlando, Florida	Eliminated January 22
JJ O'Day	12	Santa Fe, Texas	Eliminated January 15
Kya Lau	8	San Marino, California	Eliminated January 15
Kamilly Serrano	10	Santa Ana, California	Eliminated January 8
Sam Sy	10	Charleston, South Carolina	Eliminated January 8
Corey Gifft	12	Surprise, Arizona	Eliminated January 8
Kaitlyn Tomeny	11	Yorktown Heights, New York	Eliminated January 8
Ian Marcel Sanders	8	Beverly Shores, Indiana	Eliminated December 18
Jesse Gunn	11	New York, New York	Eliminated December 18
Mia Evans	11	Leander, Texas	Eliminated December 11
Tae-Ho Ahn	12	Chula Vista, California	Eliminated December 11
Derek Quinn	11	Yardley, Pennsylvania	Eliminated December 4
Nate Murawski	10	Philadelphia, Pennsylvania	Eliminated December 4
Adam Queens	11	Brooklyn, New York	Eliminated November 27
Jaeclyn Clark	9	Philadelphia, Pennsylvania	Eliminated November 27
Kyndall Latson	9	Philadelphia, Pennsylvania	Eliminated November 20
Vivian Stich	11	Avondale, Arizona	Eliminated November 20
Annabelle Nolan	10	Cookeville, Tennessee	Eliminated November 13
Chad Gibbs	9	Poughkeepsie, New York	Eliminated November 13
Alexander Cochran	10	Phoenix, Arizona	Eliminated November 6
Kade Dugas	9	Morgan City, Louisiana	Eliminated November 6

== Elimination table ==
Place	Contestant	Episode																				
Place	Contestant	1		2		3		4		5	6		7		8		9		10	11		12
1	Addison	IN	WIN	IN	IN	HIGH	IMM	IN	WIN	WIN	IN	IN	IN	WIN	IMM	LOW	HIGH	WIN	LOW	WIN	IN	WINNER
2	Avery	HIGH	IN	IMM	IN	IN	IN	IN	IN	PT	WIN	IMM	IN	IN	IMM	WIN	IN	IN	WIN	IN	WIN	RUNNER-UP
3	Amaya	IN	IN	IMM	IN	IN	IN	WIN	IMM	LOW	IN	IN	IN	WIN	IN	WIN	IN	WIN	WIN	IN	ELIM	
3	Zac	HIGH	IN	IMM	IN	IN	IN	WIN	IMM	WIN	IN	IN	IN	WIN	WIN	IMM	WIN	LOW	WIN	IN	ELIM	
5	JJ	IN	IN	IMM	IN	HIGH	IN	WIN	IMM	PT	WIN	IMM	IN	WIN	IMM	IN	IN	IN	ELIM			
5	Kya	WIN	IMM	IMM	IN	IN	IN	IN	IN	WIN	WIN	IMM	WIN	LOW	IN	IN	IN	LOW	ELIM			
7	Kamilly	IN	IN	IMM	LOW	IN	IN	IN	IN	WIN	WIN	IMM	IN	WIN	WIN	IMM	IN	ELIM				
7	Sam	IN	WIN	WIN	IMM	IN	IN	IN	IN	PT	WIN	IMM	IN	IN	IMM	IN	HIGH	ELIM				
9	Corey	IN	IN	IMM	IN	IN	IN	IN	LOW	WIN	IN	LOW	HIGH	LOW	IMM	ELIM						
9	Kaitlyn	IN	IN	IMM	IN	WIN	IMM	IN	IN	WIN	IN	WIN	HIGH	WIN	IMM	ELIM						
11	Ian	IN	LOW	IMM	IN	IN	IN	WIN	IMM	LOW	WIN	IMM	HIGH	ELIM								
11	Jesse	IN	WIN	IN	IN	IN	IN	WIN	IMM	PT	WIN	IMM	IN	ELIM								
13	Mia	IN	IN	IMM	IN	IN	IN	WIN	IMM	WIN	IN	ELIM										
13	Tae-Ho	IN	IN	IMM	WIN	IN	IN	IN	IN	WIN	IN	ELIM										
15	Derek	IN	IN	IMM	IN	IN	IN	IN	IN	ELIM												
15	Nate	IN	IN	IMM	IN	IN	WIN	IN	WIN	ELIM												
17	Adam	IN	IN	IMM	IN	IN	IN	IN	ELIM													
17	Jaeclyn	IN	IN	IMM	IN	IN	LOW	IN	ELIM													
19	Kyndall	IN	IN	IMM	IN	IN	ELIM															
19	Vivian	IN	IMM	IMM	LOW	IN	ELIM															
21	Annabelle	IN	IN	IMM	ELIM																	
21	Chad	IN	IN	IMM	ELIM																	
23	Alexander	IN	ELIM																			
23	Kade	IN	ELIM																			

(WINNER) This cook won the competition.
(RUNNER-UP) This cook finished in second place.
(WIN) The cook won the individual challenge (Mystery Box or Elimination Test).
(WIN) The cook was on the winning team in the Team Challenge and directly advanced to the next round.
(HIGH) The cook was one of the top entries in an individual challenge, but did not win.
(PT) The cook was on the losing team in the Team Challenge, competed in the Pressure Test, and advanced.
(IN) The cook was not selected as a top or bottom entry in an individual challenge.
(IN) The cook was not selected as a top or bottom entry in a Team Challenge.
(IMM) The cook did not have to compete in that round of the competition and was safe from elimination.
(IMM) The cook was selected by the Mystery Box Challenge winner and did not have to compete in the Elimination Test.
(LOW) The cook was one of the bottom entries in an individual challenge, and advanced.
(LOW) The cook was one of the bottom entries in a Team Challenge, and advanced.
(ELIM) The cook was eliminated.

== Episodes ==
No. overall	No. in season	Title	Original release date	U.S. viewers (millions)
23	1	"New Kids on the Chopping Block"	November 6, 2015	4.16
Mystery Box Challenge: For the mystery box challenge, the contestants must cook their signature burger. The top three dishes were Avery's, Zac's, and Kya's. Kya wins the first Mystery Box challenge.; Challenge Winner/Immune: Kya Lau; Elimination Challenge: Kya is safe from elimination and gets to enjoy a cake made by Christina. Kya can also select a second contestant to be immune from elimination. She picks Vivian. The cooks learn marshmallows will be the star ingredient in their next dishes. The judges call up Addison, Ian, Kade, Sam, Jesse, and Alexander. Sam, Jesse, and Addison are deemed to have the best dishes of the night, leaving Alexander, Kade, and Ian as the bottom three.; Immune: Vivian Stich; Winners: Addison Osta Smith, Jesse Gunn and Sam Sy; Bottom three: Alexander Cochran, Ian Marcel Sanders and Kade Dugas; Ian is sent to safety, eliminating both Alexander and Kade.; Eliminated: Alexander Cochran and Kade Dugas
24	2	"A Sweet Surprise"	November 13, 2015	3.85
Individual Challenge: Sam, Jesse, and Addison compete against one another in a cupcake-frosting race. They have ten minutes to frost as many cupcakes as perfectly as Christina demonstrates. The winner will get immunity from elimination and the losers will have to press a giant button that unleashes a large amount of frosting on whichever judge the kid is paired with. Addison gets Gordon, Sam is with Graham, and Jesse is with Christina. The judges invite MasterChef Junior season 2 winner Logan Guleff to officiate this round. Sam and his twenty-nine perfectly frosted cupcakes beat Jesse's eleven cupcakes and Addison's ten which means Sam wins immunity and Graham will get no frosting on him. Gordon and Christina get their frosting shower, then the contestants have a frosting food fight.; Challenge Winner/Immune: Sam Sy; Elimination Challenge: The kids have one hour to come up with a scallop dish, but the contestants will have to shuck the scallops themselves. Gordon gives a quick shucking lesson and then sends the kids off to create a dish. Tae-Ho is declared the winner of this elimination test. Kamilly, Chad, Annabelle, and Vivian are announced as the bottom four.; Winner: Tae-Ho Ahn; Bottom four: Annabelle Nolan, Chad Gibbs, Kamilly Serrano and Vivian Stich; Kamilly and Vivian are sent to safety, eliminating Chad and Annabelle.; Eliminated: Annabelle Nolan and Chad Gibbs
25	3	"One Small Step"	November 20, 2015	3.81
Mystery Box Challenge: For the mystery box challenge, the contestants are required to create a dish using various types of cheese. The top three dishes were Addison's, Kaitlyn's, and JJ's. Kaitlyn was announced as the winner of the Mystery Box.; Challenge Winner/Immune: Kaitlyn Tomeny; Elimination Challenge: Kaitlyn is safe from elimination. The rest of the contestants are required to create a delicious fish dish using various types of fish. After shown how to filet a giant moonfish by Graham, the cooks have to pick which fish to be used for their dishes. Kaitlyn can also select a second contestant to be immune from elimination. She picks Addison. Among the contestants, Avery picked halibut, Jesse picked mackerel, Nate picked yellowtail, while Vivian, Jaeclyn and Sam all picked Thai snapper, and lastly Kya picked salmon. The best fish dish of the night belonged to Nate. Vivian, Kyndall and Jaeclyn, were called down to the front for having the worst three fish dishes of the night.; Immune: Addison Osta Smith; Winner: Nate Murwaski; Bottom three: Jaeclyn Clark, Kyndall Latson and Vivian Stich; Jaeclyn was sent to safety, resulting in the elimination of both Vivian and Kyndall.; Eliminated: Kyndall Latson and Vivian Stich
26	4	"The Good, the Bad and the Smelly"	November 27, 2015	3.20
Team Challenge: The home cooks were split into three teams and they must compete to see which team can create a seven layer dip in a relay challenge, with the winning team getting to dunk that judge's head in the dip. Ian's team has Zac, Amaya, JJ, Jesse, and Mia. Avery's team has Kaitlyn, Tae-Ho, Derek, Adam, and Jaeclyn, while Kya's team has Addison, Sam, Kamilly, Corey, and Nate. Ian's team wins.; Team Challenge Winners/Immune: Amaya Baéz, Ian Marcel Sanders, Jesse Gunn, JJ O'Day, Mia Wistwostika and Zac Kara; Elimination Challenge: Ian, Amaya, Jesse, JJ, Mia and Zac are immune from elimination. They also get to select which selection of ingredients the remaining contestants must cook in the upcoming challenge. The team selected Graham's "smelly" ingredients. Addison had the best dish, followed by Nate. The worst three dishes belonged to Corey, Jaeclyn and Adam.; Winners: Addison Osta Smith and Nate Murwaski; Bottom three: Adam Queens, Corey Gifft and Jaeclyn Clark; Adam and Jaeclyn were eliminated.; Eliminated: Adam Queens and Jaeclyn Clark
27	5	"Happy Birthday"	December 4, 2015	3.51
Team Challenge: The cooks will be split into two teams where they will be serving party food to a group of young kids in a birthday lunch party. Addison and Nate will be team captains. For her Blue Team, Addison picked Kya, Mia, Kaitlyn, Corey, Zac, Kamilly and Tae-Ho, while for his Red Team, Nate picked Derek, Sam, JJ, Amaya, Jesse, Avery, and was left with Ian. The Blue Team won the challenge.; Team Challenge Winners/Immune: Addison Osta Smith, Corey Gifft, Kaitlyn Tomeny, Kamilly Serrano, Kya Lau, Mia Wistwostika, Tae-Ho Ahn and Zac Kara; Pressure Test: The Red Team will have to create a croquembouche. Amaya, Derek, Ian and Nate were left to have the worst croquembouches of the challenge.; Bottom four: Amaya Baéz, Derek Quinn, Ian Marcel Sanders and Nate Murwaski; Amaya and Ian were judged to have just done enough to be sent to safety, eliminating Nate and Derek.; Eliminated: Derek Quinn and Nate Murwaski
28	6	"When Life Gives You Lemons"	December 11, 2015	3.79
Team Challenge: The remaining chefs are split into two teams; the Red Team consists of Avery, Kya, JJ, Sam, Kamilly, Jesse, and Ian while the Blue Team has Addison, Zac, Amaya, Kaitlyn, Corey, Mia, and Tae-Ho. Each team has seven minutes to make a glass of raspberry mint lemonade and serve it to Christina for a blind tasting. Christina declared the Red team as the winner of the challenge.; Team Challenge Winners/Immune: Avery Kyle, Ian Marcel Sanders, Jesse Gunn, JJ O'Day, Kamilly Serrano, Kya Lau and Sam Sy; Elimination Test: The remaining cooks are tasked to make a lobster and steak dish in 60 minutes. Kaitlyn was declared as the winner, while the worst three dishes of the night belonged to Tae-Ho, Mia and Corey.; Winner: Kaitlyn Tomeny; Bottom three: Corey Gifft, Mia Wistwostika and Tae-Ho Ahn; Corey's dish was deemed the best of the worst and he was sent to safety, eliminating Tae-Ho and Mia.; Eliminated: Mia Wistwostika and Tae-Ho Ahn
29	7	"Blind Ambition"	December 18, 2015	3.97
Mystery Box Challenge: The home cooks will be tasting a dish made by Gordon Ramsay while blindfolded, and then tasked to replicate it in one hour. Kya and Kaitlyn win the challenge.; Challenge Winners: Kaitlyn Tomeny and Kya Lau; Elimination Test: This will be a team challenge, where the home cooks need to serve 31 dishes using ingredients from New England or New Mexico in 90 minutes. Kya and Kaitlyn will be team captains for this challenge, Kya chose to select the ingredients first and chose the crate from New England. Kaitlyn picked Addison, Zac, Kamilly, JJ and Amaya for the Blue Team, while Kya chose Avery, Sam, Corey, Jesse and Ian for the Red Team. The Blue Team was the winner. Kya, Corey, Jesse, and Ian will face elimination.; Challenge Winners: Addison Osta Smith, Amaya Baéz, JJ O'Day, Kaitlyn Tomeny, Kamilly Serrano and Zac Kara; Bottom four: Corey Gifft, Kya Lau, Ian Marcel Sanders and Jesse Gunn; The judges send Ian and Jesse home.; Eliminated: Ian Marcel Sanders and Jesse Gunn
30	8	"Hatching a Plan"	January 8, 2016	4.49
Team Challenge: Only four kids will get to compete for immunity in the Elimination Test. Zac and Kamilly form the Red Team, while Kya and Amaya form the Blue Team. The two teams will make the most correctly cooked deviled eggs in twelve minutes, and the winning them will be safe from the upcoming elimination challenge. Gordon Ramsay and Graham Elliot are the Yellow Team, and if Gordon and Graham win the challenge, all home cooks will have to compete in the upcoming elimination challenge. Zac and Kamilly are the winners.; Team Challenge Winners/Immune: Kamilly Serrano and Zac Kara; Elimination Test: The contestants were asked to do one signature recipe. Avery and Amaya have the best dishes of the night. The bottom three were Corey, Addison, and Kaitlyn.; Winners: Amaya Baéz and Avery Kyle; Bottom three: Corey Gifft, Kaitlyn Tomeny and Addison Osta Smith; Addison was sent to safety, leading to the elimination of Corey and Kaitlyn.; Eliminated: Corey Gifft and Kaitlyn Tomeny
31	9	"Tag Team Time"	January 8, 2016	4.49
Mystery Box Challenge: The kids will have 60 minutes to make any dish they want using the Mystery Box ingredients. The best three dishes were Addison's, Zac's, and Sam's. Zac was declared as the winner of the Mystery Box.; Challenge Winner: Zac Kara; Elimination Test: The kids will be put into four teams of two, and only one of them can cook at a time. Every ten minutes, the judges will call for a switch, and the other teammate will pick up where the first left off. The teams will have to cook five different types of street food from around the world. Zac gets to select his teammate and pair up the other contestants. He picks Kya as his teammate, and pairs Sam and Kamilly, Addison and Amaya, and JJ and Avery. Amaya and Addison were the winners of the challenge. Zac, Kya, Sam, and Kamilly are at the bottom.; Team Challenge Winners: Addison Osta Smith and Amaya Baéz; Bottom four: Kamilly Serrano, Kya Lau, Sam Sy and Zac Kara; Sam and Kamilly are eliminated.; Eliminated: Kamilly Serrano and Sam Sy
32	10	"A Gordon Ramsay Dinner Party"	January 15, 2016	4.56
Team Challenge: The contestants will be split into two teams, chosen by Addison and Amaya, and are responsible for feeding twenty of Gordon's friends. Addison picks Kya and JJ for her Blue Team, while Amaya picks Zac and Avery for her Red Team. The Red Team wins.; Team Challenge Winners: Amaya Baéz, Avery Kyle and Zac Kara; Bottom three: Addison Osta Smith, JJ O'Day and Kya Lau; The judges send Addison to safety, eliminating JJ and Kya.; Eliminated: JJ O'Day and Kya Lau
33	11	"Head of the Class"	January 22, 2016	4.87
Mystery Box Challenge: The contestants reunite with their parents. They must create a soufflé for the final Mystery Box Challenge. The judges pick Addison's soufflé.; Challenge Winner: Addison Osta Smith; Elimination Test: Addison gets to decide who gets which cut of various pork products. Zac gets pig's ears, Addison wants the ribs for herself, and Avery gets the pork belly, which leaves Amaya with the loin. Avery has the best dish and is a finalist.; Winner: Avery Kyle; The judges then announce Addison as the second finalist, eliminating Amaya and Zac.; Eliminated: Amaya Baéz and Zac Kara
34	12	"The Finale"	January 29, 2016	4.75
Season Finale: The judges want the finalists to prepare and present a three-course meal – appetizer, entrée, and dessert.; Appetizer: Addison makes a sake marinated shrimp with seaweed and sea bean salad, sour plums, and puffed rice salad. Avery makes a cream of asparagus soup with smoked oysters, crème fraiche, and creole crouton; Entrée: Addison makes a miso black cod with bok choy, shiitake mushrooms, and coconut ginger broth. Avery makes a seafood étouffée with crispy okra and white rice.; Dessert: Addison makes a green tea panna cotta with cookie crumbles and brûléed plums. Avery makes strawberry shortcake with rhubarb and orange chantilly cream.; Final Two: Addison Osta Smith and Avery Kyle; Winner Announced: Addison is announced as the fourth MasterChef Junior winner, taking home the trophy and the $100,000 prize. In addition, Addison became the youngest overall winner.; MasterChef Junior Winner: Addison Osta Smith
