= MasterChef Junior (American TV series) season 2 =

Season of television series

MasterChef Junior
- Season 2
- Judges: Joe Bastianich; Graham Elliot; Gordon Ramsay
- No. of contestants: 16
- Winner: Logan Guleff
- Runner-up: Samuel Stromberg
- No. of episodes: 7

Release
- Original network: Fox
- Original release: November 4 – December 16, 2014

Season chronology
- ← Previous; Season 1 Next → Season 3

The second season of the American competitive reality television series MasterChef Junior premiered on Fox on November 4, 2014, and concluded on December 16, 2014.

The winner was Logan Guleff, an 11-year-old from Memphis, Tennessee, with 12-year-old Samuel Stromberg from Greenbrae, California being the runner-up.

== Top 16 ==
Contestant	Age	Hometown	Status
Logan Guleff	11	Memphis, Tennessee	Winner December 16
Samuel Stromberg	12	Greenbrae, California	Runner-Up December 16
Abby Major	8	Winchester, Virginia	Eliminated December 9
Adaiah Stevens	12	Danbury, Connecticut	Eliminated December 9
Oona Yaffe	9	New Haven, Connecticut	Eliminated December 2
Sean Le	12	Santa Ana, California	Eliminated December 2
Josh Reisner	10	Forest Hills, New York	Eliminated November 25
Levi Eirinberg	12	Highland Park, Illinois	Eliminated November 25
Mitchell Vasquez	12	Paso Robles, California	Eliminated November 18
Sam Karpinski	9	Reseda, California	Eliminated November 18
Jessica Stephens	10	Grand Prairie, Texas	Eliminated November 11
Natalie Jawher	12	Greenbrae, California	Eliminated November 11
Berry Nakash	11	Beverly Hills, California	Eliminated November 4
Coco Welch	10	Aquilla, Texas	Eliminated November 4
Isabella Velez	12	New York, New York	Eliminated November 4
Nasir Lomax	10	Chicago, Illinois	Eliminated November 4

== Elimination table ==
Place	Contestant	Episode											
Place	Contestant	1		2		3		4		5	6		7
1	Logan	IN	IN	IMM	IN	WIN	IMM	IN	IN	WIN	IN	WIN	WINNER
2	Samuel	IN	WIN	IN	IN	IN	IN	IN	WIN	LOW	IN	IN	RUNNER-UP
3	Abby	IN	IN	IMM	IN	HIGH	IN	IN	WIN	WIN	IN	ELIM	
3	Adaiah	IN	IN	IMM	WIN	HIGH	WIN	IN	IN	WIN	WIN	ELIM	
5	Oona	HIGH	WIN	IN	IN	IN	LOW	IN	LOW	ELIM			
5	Sean	IN	WIN	WIN	IMM	WIN	IMM	WIN	LOW	ELIM			
7	Josh	IN	IN	IMM	LOW	IN	IN	IN	ELIM				
7	Levi	IN	IN	IMM	WIN	IN	WIN	IN	ELIM				
9	Mitchell	HIGH	IN	IMM	IMM	HIGH	ELIM						
9	Sam	IN	IN	IMM	LOW	HIGH	ELIM						
11	Jessica	IN	IN	IMM	ELIM								
11	Natalie	WIN	IMM	IMM	ELIM								
13	Berry	IN	ELIM										
13	Coco	IN	ELIM										
13	Isabella	IN	ELIM										
13	Nasir	IN	ELIM										

(WINNER) This cook won the competition.
(RUNNER-UP) This cook finished in second place.
(WIN) The cook won an individual challenge (Mystery Box Challenge or Elimination Test).
(WIN) The cook was on the winning team in the Team Challenge and directly advanced to the next round.
(HIGH) The cook was one of the top entries in an individual challenge, but did not win.
(HIGH) The cook was one of the top entries in an Team Challenge, but did not win.
(IN) The cook was not selected as a top or bottom entry in an individual challenge.
(IN) The cook was not selected as a top or bottom entry in a Team Challenge
(IMM) The cook did not have to compete in that round of the competition and was safe from elimination.
(IMM) The cook was selected by the Mystery Box Challenge winner and didn't have to compete in the Elimination Test.
(LOW) The cook was one of the bottom entries in an individual challenge, and advanced.
(LOW) The cook was one of the bottom entries in the Team Challenge, and advanced.
(ELIM) The cook was eliminated.

== Episodes ==
No. overall	No. in season	Title	Original release date	U.S. viewers (millions)
8	1	"The Next Generation"	November 4, 2014	5.09
Mystery Box Challenge: The kids are given one hour to make a restaurant-quality dish using the given ingredients. The top three dishes are Natalie's, Mitchell's, and Oona's. Natalie's dish is declared the best.; Challenge Winner/Immune: Natalie Jawher; Elimination Challenge: Natalie is given immunity from the Elimination Challenge, and has to pick what the other kids will be cooking in the elimination challenge from three different types of birds. She chooses chicken. The best dishes created are Oona's, Samuel's, and Sean's. The bottom four are Nasir's, Berry's, Isabella's, and Coco's.; Winners: Oona Yaffe, Samuel Stromberg and Sean Le; Bottom four: Berry Nakash, Coco Welch, Isabella Velez and Nasir Lomax; Eliminated: Berry Nakash, Coco Welch, Isabella Velez and Nasir Lomax
9	2	"Flip It!"	November 11, 2014	4.89
Individual Challenge: Oona, Sean, and Samuel are given premade pancake batter and are told to make as many pancakes as they can in six minutes. The person who makes the most pancakes will get an advantage in the next challenge, as well as saving their respective judge from being drenched from a huge jar of syrup. Sean wins the challenge with nineteen pancakes, and still pours the syrup on his judge, Joe, anyway.; Challenge Winner/Immune: Sean Le; Elimination Challenge: Sean is immune from the following elimination challenge, and is shown three types of cream pie. Sean picks the citrus pie. Sean is also given the ability to save a contestant from facing the challenge. Sean picks Mitchell. Levi and Adaiah make the two best pies. Jessica, Josh, Natalie, and Sam become the bottom four.; Immune: Mitchell Vasquez; Winners: Adaiah Stevens and Levi Eirinberg; Bottom four: Jessica Balabona, Josh Reisner, Natalie Jawher and Sam Karpinski; Eliminated: Jessica Balabona and Natalie Jawher
10	3	"Mom Knows Best"	November 18, 2014	4.27
Mystery Box Challenge: A mystery box on the judges' table has cupcakes, and they each take a cupcake. There are 5 pairs of cupcakes, meaning this is a team challenge. The teams are: Adaiah and Sam, Samuel and Levi, Abby and Mitchell, Oona and Josh, and Sean and Logan. They have to make 12 cupcakes; however, they have to make them with their legs tied up. The three standout cupcakes are Adaiah and Sam, Abby and Mitchell, and Sean and Logan. Logan and Sean win the Mystery box.; Challenge Winners/Immune: Logan Guleff and Sean Le; Elimination Challenge: Logan and Sean are safe from elimination, and will choose what everyone has to cook. They have to choose among Gordon's three favorite dishes from his childhood. They choose shepherd's pie. Levi and Adaiah are deemed to have the best dishes of the night. The worst three dishes belong to Oona, Sam, and Mitchell.; Winners: Adaiah Stevens and Levi Eirinberg; Bottom three: Mitchell Vasquez, Oona Yaffe and Sam Karpinski; Eliminated: Mitchell Vasquez and Sam Karpinski
11	4	"An "Egg-Cellent" Adventure"	November 25, 2014	4.06
Mystery Box Challenge: The home cooks must make as many perfect sunny-side-up eggs as they can. Sean has ten, giving him the win.; Challenge Winner: Sean Le; Elimination Challenge: Sean is not immune from elimination. The contestants have to cook a signature dish, with only the number of ingredients of how many eggs they cooked. Samuel and Abby are the winners and are made team captains in the upcoming challenge. Josh, Levi, Oona, and Sean are declared as the bottom four.; Winners: Abby Major and Samuel Stromberg; Bottom four: Josh Reisner, Levi Eirinberg, Oona Yaffe and Sean Le; Eliminated: Josh Reisner and Levi Eirinberg
12	5	"Pop-Up Restaurant"	December 2, 2014	4.82
Team Challenge: The cooks are divided into two teams led by Samuel and Abby, with Samuel getting the first pick. Samuel chooses Sean and Oona, forming the Blue Team, while Abby chooses Adaiah and Logan, forming the Red Team. Then they are whisked off to Malibu to cook in an outdoor pop-up restaurant. Gordon, Graham, and Joe give cooking demonstrations of the required menu preparation. Forty culinary experts are invited to sample the menu. The guests write down their preferences, and based on these results, plus overall performance, one team will advance and two from the losing team will go home. The winning team is the Red Team.; Team Challenge Winners: Abby Major, Adaiah Stevens and Logan Guleff; Bottom three: Oona Yaffe, Samuel Stromberg and Sean Le; Eliminated: Oona Yaffe and Sean Le
13	6	"A Cut Above the Rest"	December 9, 2014	4.93
Mystery Box Challenge: The contestants must filet a salmon in this challenge. Ramsay gives them a quick overview. They are given forty minutes on the clock. Adaiah wins this challenge.; Challenge Winner: Adaiah Stevens; Elimination Challenge: Adaiah is not immune from elimination, but instead gets to choose which refrigerator of ingredients each contestants can work with when cooking their salmon fillets. Abby gets the fridge with 100 ingredients, Adaiah chooses the fridge with 50 ingredients, Samuel gets the fridge with 25 ingredients, and Logan gets the fridge with 5 ingredients. With the best salmon dish, Logan is the first to secure a place in the finale.; Winner: Logan Guleff; Eliminated: Abby Major and Adaiah Stevens
14	7	"The Finale"	December 16, 2014	5.61
Season Finale: Logan and Samuel must each cook a three-course meal for the finale.; Appetizer: Samuel’s first course is southeast Asian chicken oysters with pickled cucumber, radish, and crispy rice. Logan’s first course is a spot prawns dish with grilled romaine and smoked saffron aioli.; Entrée: Samuel’s second course is a seared Arctic Char with baby bok choy and mushrooms in a coconut saffron curry. Logan’s second course is a salt-crusted Branzino stuffed with lemon and thyme, served with chimichurri sauce and roasted vegetables.; Dessert: Samuel’s dessert is a Kaffir Lime panna cotta with passion fruit and raspberry, served with a ginger anise dust. Logan’s dessert is a meyer lemon madeleine with a berry compote and goat cheese mousse.; Final Two: Logan Guleff and Samuel Stromberg; Winner Revealed: Logan is announced as the second MasterChef Junior winner, taking home the trophy and the $100,000 prize, making Samuel the runner-up.; MasterChef Junior Winner: Logan Guleff
