= MasterChef Junior (American TV series) season 5 =

Season of television series

MasterChef Junior
- Season 5
- Judges: Gordon Ramsay; Christina Tosi; Rotating guest judges
- No. of contestants: 20
- Winner: Jasmine Stewart
- Runner-up: Justise Mayberry
- No. of episodes: 15

Release
- Original network: Fox
- Original release: February 9 – May 18, 2017

Season chronology
- ← Previous; Season 4 Next → Season 6

The fifth season of the American competitive reality television series MasterChef Junior premiered on Fox on February 9, 2017, and concluded on May 18, 2017. The season is hosted by regular judges Gordon Ramsay and Christina Tosi, accompanied by a rotating series of guest judges.

The winner was Jasmine Stewart, an 11-year-old from Milton, Georgia, with Justise Mayberry from Sugar Hill, Georgia being the runner-up. This marks the first time a contestant who was eliminated earlier in the season has ever won the competition.

== Top 20 ==
Contestant	Age	Hometown	Status
Jasmine Stewart	11	Milton, Georgia	Winner May 18; Returned March 30; Eliminated March 23
Justise Mayberry	11	Sugar Hill, Georgia	Runner-Up May 18
Adam Wadhwani	12	Sacramento, California	Eliminated May 18
Shayne Wells	13	Spring, Texas	Eliminated May 18
Cydney Sherman	10	Brooklyn, New York	Eliminated May 11
Evan Robinson	10	Chicago, Illinois	Eliminated May 11
Afnan Ahmad	12	Jonesboro, Georgia	Eliminated April 20
Peyton Copeland	10	Ringoes, New Jersey	Eliminated April 20
Avani Shah	8	Chicago, Illinois	Eliminated April 13
Mark Coblentz	13	Starkville, Mississippi	Eliminated April 13
Gonzalo Ingram	11	Whitestone, New York	Eliminated April 6 Returned March 30; Eliminated March 9
Lila Deluca	9	Rockport, Massachusetts	Eliminated April 6
Sydney "Syd" Neuser	9	West Bend, Wisconsin	Eliminated March 23
Donovan Millstein	9	Brooklyn, New York	Eliminated March 16
Mashu Nishi	13	Thousand Oaks, California	Eliminated March 16
Charlie Hans	9	Chicago, Illinois	Eliminated March 9
Eddie Levine	9	New York, New York	Eliminated March 2
Sam Brock	9	Concord, Massachusetts	Eliminated March 2
Elisabeth Wingo	9	Sweetwater, Texas	Eliminated February 23
Solomon Yero	10	Houston, Texas	Eliminated February 23

== Elimination table ==
Place	Contestant	Episode																				
Place	Contestant	3		4		5	6		7		8	9	10		11		12		13	14		15
1	Jasmine	IN	IN	IMM	IN	WIN	IN	IN	IN	ELIM	RET	PT	IN	IN	IN	WIN	WIN	HIGH	WIN	WIN	IN	WINNER
2	Justise	IN	IN	WIN	IMM	WIN	WIN	IMM	WIN	IMM	IMM	PT	IN	IN	WIN	IN	LOW	HIGH	WIN	IN	IN	RUNNER-UP
3	Adam	IN	WIN	IMM	WIN	LOW	IN	IN	IN	IN	IMM	WIN	IN	WIN	HIGH	WIN	LOW	LOW	LOW	IN	ELIM	
3	Shayne	IN	IMM	IMM	WIN	WIN	IN	IMM	IN	LOW	IMM	LOW	IN	IN	IN	IN	WIN	LOW	WIN	IN	ELIM	
5	Cydney	HIGH	IN	IMM	LOW	WIN	IN	IN	IN	IN	IMM	WIN	WIN	IMM	IN	LOW	LOW	LOW	ELIM			
5	Evan	IN	IN	WIN	IMM	IN	IN	LOW	WIN	IMM	IMM	WIN	IN	LOW	IN	LOW	WIN	HIGH	ELIM			
7	Afnan	WIN	IMM	IMM	IN	IN	IN	WIN	WIN	IMM	IMM	WIN	IN	WIN	HIGH	ELIM						
7	Peyton	IN	IN	IN	IN	WIN	HIGH	IN	IN	IN	IMM	PT	WIN	IMM	IN	ELIM						
9	Avani	IN	IMM	IMM	LOW	IN	IN	IN	IN	WIN	IMM	WIN	IN	ELIM								
9	Mark	IN	IN	IMM	IN	WIN	IN	IMM	IN	LOW	IMM	WIN	IN	ELIM								
11	Gonzalo	IN	LOW	IN	IN	ELIM					RET	ELIM										
11	Lila	IN	IN	IN	IN	WIN	HIGH	IN	IN	IN	IMM	ELIM										
13	Syd	IN	IN	IMM	IN	IN	IN	IN	IN	ELIM												
14	Donovan	IN	IN	IMM	IN	IN	IN	ELIM														
14	Mashu	HIGH	IN	IMM	IN	WIN	IN	ELIM														
16	Charlie	IN	IN	IMM	IN	ELIM																
17	Eddie	IN	IMM	IN	ELIM																	
17	Sam	IN	LOW	IMM	ELIM																	
19	Elisabeth	IN	ELIM																			
19	Solomon	IN	ELIM																			

(WINNER) This cook won the competition.
(RUNNER-UP) This cook finished in second place.
(WIN) The cook won an individual challenge (Mystery Box Challenge, Elimination Test, or Skills Challenge).
(WIN) The cook was on the winning team in the Team Challenge and directly advanced to the next round.
(HIGH) The cook was one of the top entries in the individual challenge but didn't win.
(IN) The cook was not selected as a top or bottom entry in an individual challenge.
(IN) The cook was not selected as a top or bottom entry in a Team Challenge.
(IMM) The cook did not have to compete in that round of the competition and was safe from elimination.
(IMM) The cook was selected by the Mystery Box Challenge winner and didn't have to compete in the Elimination Test.
(RET) The cook won the Reinstation Challenge and returned to the competition.
(LOW) The cook was one of the bottom entries in an individual challenge or Pressure Test and advanced.
(LOW) The cook was one of the bottom entries in a Team Challenge, and advanced.
(PT) The cook was on the losing team in the Team Challenge, competed in the Pressure Test, and advanced.
(ELIM) The cook was eliminated.

== Guest judges ==
- Aarón Sanchez (episodes 3 and 10)
- Mayim Bialik (episode 4)
- Julie Bowen (episode 6)
- Richard Blais (episodes 7 and 8)
- Edward Lee (episode 11)
- Wolfgang Puck and Martha Stewart (episode 15)

== Main guest appearances ==
- Michelle Obama (episode 6)
- Muppets Miss Piggy and Swedish Chef (episode 12)

== Episodes ==
No. overall	No. in season	Title	Original release date	U.S. viewers (millions)
35	1	"The Quest for an Apron Part 1"	February 9, 2017	4.21
40 junior chefs will be competing for a white apron and a spot in the Top 20. The kids will be divided into groups of four, and each group will be cooking a similarly-themed dish, with only two advancing from each group. Gordon Ramsay and Christina Tosi are the sole judges for these qualifiers. The first group consists of Elisabeth, Barbara, Cydney, and Na'imah, who are all bakers and must make tartlets. Elisabeth and Cydney advance. The next group consists of Donovan, Kamryn, Sydney, and Logan, who are making salmon dishes. Sydney and Donovan advance. The third group consists of Liani, Jasmine, Mark, and Kaitlyn, who are making pork chop dishes. Mark and Jasmine advance. The fourth group consists of Gonzalo, Madyson, Emma, and Justise, who are making a scallop dish identical to one prepared by Gordon. Justise and Gonzalo advance.
36	2	"The Quest for an Apron Part 2"	February 16, 2017	3.72
The next group to compete is Adam, Jazzy, Dredyan, and Peyton, who are making cupcakes. Adam and Peyton advance. Next up, Anna, Nicholas, Shayne, and Solomon are all from Texas and are making steaks. Shayne and Solomon advance. Avani, Eddie, Grace, and Londyn are the next group making chicken dishes. Eddie and Avani advance. Charlie, Evan, Afnan, and Mashu are shown advancing, but they are not shown competing. Finally, Jake, Sam, Jayda, and Lila, who are all from Massachusetts, make lobster dishes. Lila and Sam advance.
37	3	"Just Like Gordon"	February 23, 2017	3.83
Aarón Sanchez is the guest judge this week.; Mystery Box Challenge The contestants are first showered with rice, and they must use rice in addition to the ingredients in the mystery box to make their dish. The top three dishes belonged to Afnan, Cydney and Mashu. Afnan wins this challenge and is immune for the next challenge.; Challenge Winner/Immune: Afnan Ahmad; Elimination Challenge: Afnan gets to choose three other people to be safe from this challenge; he saves Avani, Eddie, and Shayne. The remaining contestants must replicate a sea bass dish as demonstrated by Gordon. Adam's dish is declared the winner, while Elisabeth, Solomon, Sam, and Gonzalo’s dishes are the worst.; Immune: Avani Shah, Eddie Levine, Shayne Wells; Winner: Adam Wadhwani; Bottom four: Elisabeth Wingo, Gonzalo Ingram, Sam Brock, Solomon Yero; Sam and Gonzalo are saved, eliminating Elisabeth and Solomon.; Eliminated: Elisabeth Wingo and Solomon Yero
38	4	"Batter Hurry Up"	March 2, 2017	3.63
Team Challenge: The kids draw from a handful of sticks to see who will compete in the challenge. Eddie, Evan, Gonzalo, Justise, Lila, and Peyton draw the short sticks and must compete. Evan and Justise are paired to make the Blue Team, Gonzalo and Eddie are the Yellow Team, and Lila and Peyton are the Red Team. Each team has ten minutes to make as many perfect corn dogs as possible. The winning team is immune from the next challenge and gets to choose which judge gets covered in corn dog batter. The Blue Team makes 13 perfect corn dogs to win the challenge, and they have Gordon covered in the batter, but he then gets Christina covered.; Immune: Adam Wadwhani, Afnan Ahmad, Avani Shah, Charlie Hans, Cydney Sherman, Donovan Milstein, Jasmine Stewart, Mark Coblentz, Mashu Nishi, Shayne Wells, Syd Neuser, Sam Brock; Team Challenge Winners/Immune: Evan Robinson and Justise Mayberry; Mayim Bialik is introduced as this week's guest judge.; Elimination Challenge: The remaining contestants have 45 minutes to make a burger and a side; however, they must make them vegan. Adam and Shayne are the winners of this challenge, while Cydney, Sam, Avani, and Eddie have the worst dishes.; Winners: Adam Wadhwani and Shayne Wells; Bottom four: Avani Shah, Cydney Sherman, Eddie Levine, Sam Brock; Cydney and Avani are saved, sending Eddie and Sam home.; Eliminated: Eddie Levine and Sam Brock
39	5	"Kitchen Emergency"	March 9, 2017	3.79
Team Challenge: The kids are split into two teams, with Adam and Shayne as the team captains, since they won the last challenge. Shayne captains the Red Team of Mark, Mashu, Justise, Lila, Cydney, Peyton, and Jasmine, while Adam leads the Blue Team of Afnan, Gonzalo, Evan, Donovan, Sydney, Charlie, and Avani. The teams are taken to a Cal Fire base, where they will cook lunch for 51 first responders. They will have 75 minutes to prep and cook a meal with a filet mignon, two sides of their choice, and a sauce. The first responders will taste both dishes and vote on the winning team, and two members of the losing team will be sent home. The Red Team wins the challenge with 58% of the total votes.; Team Challenge Winners/Immune: Cydney Sherman, Jasmine Stewart, Justise Mayberry, Lila Deluca, Mark Coblentz, Mashu Nishi, Peyton Copeland, Shayne Wells; Back at the MasterChef kitchen, Adam, Gonzalo, and Charlie are called out as the worst performers on their team.; Bottom three: Adam Wadhwani, Charlie Hans, Gonzalo Ingram; Adam is saved, sending Charlie and Gonzalo home.; Eliminated: Charlie Hans and Gonzalo Ingram
40	6	"A Presidential Mystery Box"	March 16, 2017	3.96
Mystery Box Challenge: Former First Lady Michelle Obama appears via video to tell the kids they must make a dish in accordance with the MyPlate standards in 60 minutes. The top three dishes belong to Peyton, Lila, and Justise. Justise wins the challenge, earning both immunity in the next round and a trip to the White House.; Challenge Winner/Immune: Justise Mayberry; Elimination Challenge: Actress Julie Bowen is this week's guest judge, and she wants the kids to prepare a dish inspired by their mothers. They each get a picture of their mothers to encourage them. Justise gets to save two other kids, and she chooses Mark and Shayne. The other kids have 60 minutes to prepare their dishes. Afnan has the best dish, while Donovan, Mashu, and Evan are the worst.; Immune: Mark Coblentz and Shayne Wells; Challenge Winner: Afnan Ahmad; Bottom three: Donovan Milstein, Evan Robinson, Mashu Nishi; Evan is saved, sending Donovan and Mashu home.; Eliminated: Donovan Milstein and Mashu Nishi
41	7	"Pie-Eyed"	March 23, 2017	3.81
Chef Richard Blais is this week's guest judge.; Team Challenge: The kids draw colored straws to make teams. Mark, Lila, and Syd are the Blue Team; Afnan, Justise, and Evan are the Brown Team; Peyton, Shayne, and Cydney are the Yellow Team; and Jasmine, Avani, and Adam are the Red Team. Each team has ten minutes to make as many perfect pistachio pudding pies as they can. Yellow Team had 8 pies, Blue Team had 12 pies, Red Team had 10 pies, and Brown Team had 14 pies, giving them immunity and a reward of smashing a pie into a judge's face.; Challenge Winners/Immune: Afnan Ahmad, Evan Robinson, Justise Mayberry; Elimination Challenge: The remaining contestants have 45 minutes to make their best dish featuring something prepared with the help of a blow-torch. Avani makes the best dish, while Jasmine, Mark, Syd and Shayne are in the bottom.; Challenge Winner: Avani Shah; Bottom four: Jasmine Stewart, Mark Coblentz, Shayne Wells, Sydney "Syd" Neuser; Mark and Shayne are saved, sending Jasmine and Syd home.; Eliminated: Jasmine Stewart and Sydney "Syd" Neuser
42	8	"Winner, Winner, Chicken Dinner"	March 30, 2017	3.58
Richard Blais returns as the guest judge this week.; Reinstatement Challenge 1: The last six eliminated home cooks (Jasmine, Syd, Donovan, Mashu, Charlie, and Gonzalo) return for a chance to win their way back into the competition. All the other contestants do not have to compete this week. The six kids will have ten minutes to break down a chicken into clean parts. Jasmine is the winner and will have an advantage in the next round.; Challenge Winner: Jasmine Stewart; Reinstatement Challenge 2: The kids will have 45 minutes to cook a dish with a cut of the chicken, and Jasmine gets to assign the parts to the contestants. She gives breasts to Donovan, drumsticks to Charlie, thighs to Gonzalo, oysters to herself, giblets to Syd, and leaves wings to Mashu. Jasmine and Gonzalo win the challenge and are reinstated to the competition.; Winners/Reinstated: Gonzalo Ingram and Jasmine Stewart
43	9	"Scouts Honor"	April 6, 2017	3.21
Team Challenge: The kids are taken to an outdoor camping area, where they are split into two teams. They will cook for 50 Boy Scouts, Girl Scouts, and their leaders. Peyton is chosen to captain the Blue Team and she picks Justise, Jasmine, Shayne, Gonzalo, and Lila. Evan is chosen to captain the Red Team and he picks Mark, Cydney, Afnan, Adam, and Avani. Each team has 75 minutes to prep and cook a dish featuring a bone-in pork chop and two sides of their choice, followed by one hour to serve it. The Scouts and their leaders will choose the winning team. The Red Team wins the challenge 63% to 37%.; Challenge Winners/Immune: Adam Wadhwani, Afnan Ahmad, Avani Shah, Cydney Sherman, Evan Robinson, Mark Coblentz; Pressure Test: Back in the MasterChef kitchen, the Blue Team members have one hour to make a box of almond macaroons. Peyton, Justise, and Jasmine are judged to be good enough to move on to safety.; Bottom three: Gonzalo Ingram, Lila Deluca, Shayne Wells; Shayne is saved, sending Gonzalo and Lila home.; Eliminated: Gonzalo Ingram and Lila Deluca
44	10	"Winter Wonderland"	April 13, 2017	3.28
Team Challenge: The kids get gifts with colored aprons in them to assign teams. Adam and Jasmine are the Red Team, Cydney and Peyton are the Yellow Team, Avani and Shayne are the Blue Team, Afnan and Mark are the Pink Team, and Justise and Evan are the Green Team. Each team will have 20 minutes to replicate decorating a gingerbread house. Cydney and Peyton win the challenge and immunity. Afterwards, a giant gingerbread man appears and sprays the kids with frosting for fun; he is revealed to be this week's returning guest judge Aarón Sanchez.; Challenge Winners/Immune: Cydney Sherman and Peyton Copeland; Elimination Challenge: The remaining contestants must make a Beef Wellington with two sides and a sauce of their choice in one hour. Adam and Afnan are the winners of the challenge, while Mark, Evan, and Avani are called out as the bottom three.; Challenge Winners: Adam Wadhwani and Afnan Ahmad; Bottom three: Avani Shah, Evan Robinson, Mark Coblentz; Evan is saved, sending Avani and Mark home.; Eliminated: Avani Shah and Mark Coblentz
45	11	"Tag Team"	April 20, 2017	3.59
Chef Edward Lee is this week's guest judge.; Mystery Box Challenge: The kids get visited by their families. They open their Mystery Boxes to find a Blue Apron box with ingredients to make a family meal in 45 minutes, and the winner will have their recipe published by Blue Apron and get an advantage in the next challenge. Afnan, Justise, and Adam are the top three, and Justise wins the challenge.; Challenge Winner: Justise Mayberry; Elimination Challenge: The kids are put into four teams of two, and only one of them can cook at a time. Every ten minutes, the judges will call for a switch, and the other teammate will pick up where the first left off. The teams have to make a sushi platter in one hour. Justise gets to select her teammate and pair up the other contestants. She picks Shayne as her teammate, and pairs Jasmine and Adam, Cydney and Evan, and Afnan and Peyton. Adam and Jasmine are the winners of the challenge. Justise and Shayne also do well enough to move on to the next round, while Afnan, Cydney, Evan, and Peyton are called out as the bottom four.; Challenge Winners: Adam Wadhwani and Jasmine Stewart; Bottom four: Afnan Ahmad, Cydney Sherman, Evan Robinson, Peyton Copeland; Cydney and Evan are saved, sending Afnan and Peyton home.; Eliminated: Afnan Ahmad and Peyton Copeland
46	12	"The Muppets Take MasterChef"	May 4, 2017	3.34
Team Challenge: The kids are split into two teams. Adam captains the Red Team with Justise and Cydney, while Jasmine captains the Blue Team with Shayne and Evan. The teams have 75 minutes to cook a dish with one of three proteins for 20 VIP guests. The guests will taste both dishes and vote on a winner. The Blue Team wins with 55% of the votes.; Challenge Winners: Evan Robinson, Jasmine Stewart, Shayne Wells; Elimination Challenge: The kids are joined by guest Muppets Miss Piggy and Swedish Chef. Piggy chooses steak and frites for the kids to prepare, and she joins the kids while cooking. The Blue Team members get a full 30 minutes to cook, while the Red Team members get only 25 minutes. Gordon has to frequently help Piggy make her dish, to the point where he makes it himself. Piggy is chosen for the best dish, while Justise, Evan, and Jasmine have the top three dishes for the kids.; Top three: Evan Robinson, Jasmine Stewart, Justise Mayberry; Bottom three: Adam Wadhwani, Cydney Sherman, Shayne Wells; The judges save Shayne, then Adam. They then save Cydney, as Piggy has been disqualified for presenting a dish which was not hers.; Eliminated: None
47	13	"Pop-Up Restaurant"	May 11, 2017	2.95
Team Challenge: The judges split the kids into two teams. Cydney leads the Red Team with Evan and Adam, while Justise leads the Blue Team with Shayne and Jasmine. They are driven in dune buggies to a beach location, where they must cook lunch for patrons of a pop-up restaurant. They will have one hour each to prepare their appetizers and entreés, and the judges will choose the winning team. During preparation, Cydney cannot handle being captain and gives it to Adam instead. The Blue Team wins and gets immunity.; Challenge Winners/Immune: Jasmine Stewart, Justise Mayberry, Shayne Wells; Bottom three: Adam Wadhwani, Cydney Sherman, Evan Robinson; Adam is saved, sending Cydney and Evan home.; Eliminated: Cydney Sherman and Evan Robinson
48	14	"The Semi Finals"	May 18, 2017	3.52
Skills Challenge: The kids are showered in chocolate chips, then get treated to a chocolate lava cake. They are then challenged to recreate the lava cake. Jasmine wins this challenge and gets an advantage in the next round.; Challenge Winner: Jasmine Stewart; Elimination Challenge: The kids are shown four different proteins, and Jasmine gets to assign a protein to each chef. She chooses lamb for herself, beef for Adam, goat for Justise, and pork for Shayne. The judges send Justise to the finals. They then announce Jasmine as the second finalist, sending Adam and Shayne home.; Challenge Winners: Jasmine Stewart and Justise Mayberry; Eliminated: Adam Wadhwani and Shayne Wells
49	15	"Finale"	May 18, 2017	3.52
Season Finale: The judges want the finalists to prepare and present a three-course meal – appetizer, entrée, and dessert. Judges Gordon Ramsay and Christina Tosi are joined by Wolfgang Puck and Martha Stewart. The chefs must cook all three courses at once in 90 minutes.; Appetizer: Justise serves grilled spot prawns with a basil pesto, chili watermelon, and avocado balls. Jasmine serves white fish fritters with red pepper peanut sauce and papaya salad.; Entrée: Jasmine serves jerk lobster tail with coconut curry, sweet potatoes, peas, and finger lime caviar. Justise serves cider braised pork belly with wilted greens, pickled peaches, grits, and onion rings.; Dessert: Jasmine serves sticky rum cake with coconut whipped cream, guava puree, and a pineapple chip. Justise serves buttermilk panna cotta with balsamic strawberries and strawberry meringue.; Final two: Jasmine Stewart and Justise Mayberry; Winner Announced: Jasmine is announced as the fifth MasterChef Junior winner, taking home the trophy and the $100,000 prize. She became the first contestant who was previously eliminated to return and win the championship.; MasterChef Junior Winner: Jasmine Stewart
