= MasterChef (American TV series) season 16 =

2026 season of television series

MasterChef: Global Gauntlet
- Season 16
- Promotional poster for season 16, featuring (L to R) judges Joe Bastianich, Gordon Ramsay, and Tiffany Derry
- Judges: Gordon Ramsay; Joe Bastianich; Tiffany Derry
- No. of contestants: 20
- Winner: Jake Kelley
- Runners-up: Heidi Muston; Peter Egede
- No. of episodes: 18

Release
- Original network: Fox
- Original release: April 15 – September 16, 2026

Season chronology
- ← Previous; Season 15

The sixteenth season of the American competitive reality television series MasterChef (also known as MasterChef: Global Gauntlet) premiered on Fox on April 15, 2026, and concluded on September 16, 2026. Gordon Ramsay, Joe Bastianich and Tiffany Derry returned as judges.

The season was won by pharmacy technician Jake Kelley, with yacht charter broker Heidi Muston and former banking consultant Peter Egede as the runners-up.

== Production ==
The series was confirmed for a sixteenth season renewal on October 9, 2025. It was also revealed that Gordon Ramsay, Joe Bastianich and Tiffany Derry would be returning as judges for the season. It was later revealed that the season would premiere on April 15, 2026. Following the eighth episode, the season took a six-week hiatus due to the 2026 FIFA World Cup.

This is the second season of the American series not to utilize its usual soundstage in Los Angeles; the season was instead filmed at the Canadian series' set in Toronto, Ontario, Canada, as well as in Toronto's surrounding areas such as Brampton.

== Contestants ==
The top twenty contestants from this season were selected and represented four different regions in the world, Asia-Pacific, Europe, Africa and The Americas.

Note: Contestant details are as shown in graphics in the show except where cited.

Contestant	Age	Hometown	Occupation	Country heritage	Region	Status
Jake Kelley	24	Alma, Michigan	Pharmacy technician	Mexico	The Americas	Winner September 16
Heidi Muston	51	Fort Lauderdale, Florida	Yacht charter broker	South Africa	Africa	Runners-up September 16
Peter Egede	29	Atlanta, Georgia	Former banking consultant	Nigeria	Africa	Runners-up September 16
Julia Cili	23	Miami, Florida	Financial analyst	Italy	Europe	Eliminated September 2
Basia Newman	45	Asbury Park, New Jersey	Teacher	Poland	Europe	Eliminated September 2
Dave Patera	42	Chicago, Illinois	Food content creator	Algeria/Morocco	Africa	Eliminated August 26
Foo Nguyen	53	Irvine, California	Stay-at-home dad	Vietnam	Asia-Pacific	Eliminated August 19
Tkaiya Dryden	23	Jamaica, New York	Digital content specialist	Jamaica	The Americas	Eliminated August 19
Aishu (Challa) Leitz	33	Boston, Massachusetts	Mom of three	India	Asia-Pacific	Eliminated August 12
Jaime Horan (Tan)	27	Queens, New York	Content creator	Malaysia	Asia-Pacific	Eliminated August 12
Maria Bourland	48	Miami Beach, Florida	Food content creator	Brazil	The Americas	Eliminated August 5
Aghata Sunsi	35	Westminster, Colorado	Stay-at-home-mom	Spain	Europe	Eliminated July 29
Rita Igbinoba	24	Brooklyn, New York	Human resources case manager	Nigeria	Africa	Eliminated July 22
Shompa Kabir-Furqan	29	Brooklyn, New York	Content creator	Bangladesh	Asia-Pacific	Eliminated July 22
Britny Underwood	34	North Hollywood, California	Pro-wrestler & personal trainer	Barbados	The Americas	Eliminated July 15
Daniel Meng	23	Johns Creek, Georgia	Business school graduate	China	Asia-Pacific	Eliminated July 15
Nico (Cosereanu) Savoré	21	Millburn, New Jersey	Student	Italy/Romania	Europe	Eliminated June 3
Ted Pappas	50	Chicago, Illinois	Architect	Greece	Europe	Eliminated May 27
Camilo Chavez III	54	Bastrop, Texas	Wholesale business director	Mexico	The Americas	Eliminated May 20
Nora Chakri	35	Las Vegas, Nevada	Former model	Morocco	Africa	Eliminated May 13

== Elimination table ==
Place	Contestant	Episodes													
Place	Contestant	5	6	7	8	9	10	11	12	13	14	15	16		18
1	Jake	LOW	IN	WIN	IN	HIGH	IMM	WIN	HIGH	WIN	HIGH	WIN	IMM	HIGH	WINNER
2	Heidi	IN	WIN	IMM	HIGH	IN	IN	WIN	IN	LOW	WIN	WIN	IN	WIN	RUNNERS-UP
2	Peter	HIGH	IMM	WIN	LOW	LOW	HIGH	WIN	LOW	HIGH	LOW	IN	IN	LOW	RUNNERS-UP
4	Julia	LOW	IN	IN	HIGH	WIN	IMM	IN	WIN	LOW	HIGH	WIN	IN	ELIM	
5	Basia	IN	HIGH	IN	IN	IMM	LOW	IN	IMM	LOW	LOW	IN	ELIM		
6	Dave	IN	IMM	WIN	IMM	IN	IN	WIN	HIGH	WIN	WIN	ELIM			
7	Foo	IMM	LOW	IN	IMM	IN	IN	IN	LOW	LOW	ELIM				
7	Tkaiya	HIGH	IN	WIN	HIGH	IN	IMM	WIN	IN	HIGH	ELIM				
9	Aishu	WIN	IMM	IN	IMM	IN	HIGH	IN	IN	ELIM					
9	Jaime	IMM	IN	IN	WIN	IMM	IN	LOW	HIGH	ELIM					
11	Maria	IN	HIGH	WIN	LOW	IN	WIN	IMM	ELIM						
12	Aghata	HIGH	IN	IN	IN	IMM	HIGH	ELIM							
13	Rita	IN	IMM	WIN	IMM	HIGH	ELIM								
13	Shompa	IMM	HIGH	IN	IMM	HIGH	ELIM								
15	Britny	IN	IN	WIN	IN	ELIM									
15	Daniel	IMM	IN	LOW	IMM	ELIM									
17	Nico	IN	LOW	LOW	ELIM										
18	Ted	IN	IN	ELIM											
19	Camilo	IN	ELIM												
20	Nora	ELIM													

(WINNER) This cook won the competition.
(RUNNER-UP) This cook finished as a runner-up in the finals.
(WIN) The cook won the individual challenge (Mystery Box Challenge/Skills Test or Elimination Test).
(WIN) The cook was on the winning team in the Team Challenge and directly advanced to the next round.
(HIGH) The cook was one of the top entries in the individual challenge but didn't win.
(HIGH) The cook was one of the top entries in the Team Challenge.
(IN) The cook wasn't selected as a top or bottom entry in an individual challenge.
(IN) The cook wasn't selected as a top or bottom entry in a team challenge.
(IMM) The cook didn't have to compete in that round of the competition and was safe from elimination.
(IMM) The cook had to compete in that round of the competition but was safe from elimination.
(IMM) The cook was selected by the winner of the previous challenge and didn't have to compete in the Elimination Test.
(LOW) The cook was one of the bottom entries in an individual challenge, and was the last person to advance.
(LOW) The cook was one of the bottom entries in the Team Challenge and they advanced.
(ELIM) The cook was eliminated from MasterChef.

== Episodes ==
No. overall	No. in season	Title	Original release date	Prod. code	U.S. viewers (millions)
301	1	"Auditions Day 1 (Europe)"	April 15, 2026	MCH-1601	N/A
The contestants will be separated into audition groups based on the territory they are representing. They will have 45 minutes to prepare a signature dish. Europe is up first. In order to receive a white apron, contestants must receive yeses from all three judges. The first contestants are Dan and Julia. Dan fails his audition, but Julia receives three yeses and advances. Nico and Jocelyn are next. Jocelyn does not advance, however Nico does. Aghata is the next contestant. She receives three yeses earning her the next apron. Ted auditions next and earns the next apron. The final auditions are of Jeff and Basia both representing Poland. Jeff fails, however Basia succeeds earning her the final apron for Europe.
302	2	"Auditions Day 2 (Asia-Pacific)"	April 22, 2026	MCH-1602	N/A
The territory auditioning next is Asia-Pacific. Laurence is the first to audition but he fails. Aishu is the next to audition and she receives three yeses advancing her. Foo and Shompa both earn three yeses each and advance. Tony and Iman are next but both fail to earn an apron. Jaime auditions next and she gets three yeses giving her the next apron. Fatima is the next to audition but fails. Daniel is the last to audition of the day and he gets three yeses winning him the final apron for Asia-Pacific.
303	3	"Auditions Day 3 (Africa)"	April 29, 2026	MCH-1603	N/A
Africa will be the next territory to audition. Nadine is the first to audition but she fails. Nora auditions next and earns three yeses which earns her the first apron. Rita is next to audition and she also receives three yeses and an apron. Dave is the next contestant to audition and he gets three yeses as well earning him the third apron. Abel is next to audition but doesn't earn an apron. Heidi auditions next and she gets three yeses earning her the fourth apron. Meryhan is the next contestant to audition, she only receives one yes so she does not advance. The final contestant to audition is Peter and he receives three yeses and the final apron for Africa.
304	4	"Auditions Day 4 (The Americas)"	May 6, 2026	MCH-1604	N/A
The final territory to audition will be The Americas. Tkaiya is the first to audition and she receives three yeses earning her the first apron. Coby is next but fails his audition. Camilo auditions next and receives three yeses earning him the next white apron. Both Harold and Jhanelle fail their audition. Britny is who auditions next and she earns three yeses along with the third apron. Jake auditions next and receives a unanimous yes along with the fourth apron. Maria and Andrea are the final two who audition. Andrea fails her audition, but Maria receives three yeses and the last apron for Americas and overall.
305	5	"Game Day Gourmet"	May 13, 2026	MCH-1605	N/A
Elimination Challenge: The top 20 face their first challenge where they have to elevate their own version of Stadium Food while showing their heritage on a plate. The winner of this challenge will win the immunity pin and be safe from elimination in the next challenge, as well as save their entire territory from elimination that night. They have 60 minutes to make their dishes. The top four dishes belong to Aishu, Aghata, Peter, and Tkaiya, and Aishu wins the challenge, winning immunity for the entire Asia-Pacific territory. The bottom three dishes belong to Julia, Jake, and Nora. When the judges tasted Nora's dish, Tiffany spotted a band-aid in her dish, which made it an easy consensus for the judges to eliminate Nora without discussing the mistakes on Julia and Jake's dishes.; Challenge winner/Immune: Aishu (Challa) Leitz; Immune: Daniel Meng, Foo Nguyen, Jaime Horan (Tan), and Shompa Kabir-Furqan; Bottom three: Jake Kelley, Julia Cili, and Nora Chakri; Eliminated: Nora Chakri
306	6	"Eggs Benedict"	May 20, 2026	MCH-1606	N/A
Mystery Box Challenge: Aishu is immune from this challenge due to winning the previous one. The other home cooks arrive to mystery boxes and find Eggland's Best eggs inside. They are tasked with sixty minutes to make an Eggs Benedict and also putting their cultural spin on it. After a demonstration from Gordon where he made a Scottish inspired version, Aishu was revealed to have an advantage of giving one territory a tiny whisk. Targeting Europe, Aishu gives them the whisk. The top four dishes are those of Shompa, Basia, Heidi, and Maria. Heidi ends up winning saving her entire territory and earning her the immunity pin. The bottom three dishes belong to Foo, Nico and Camilo. Camilo is sent home.; Immune: Aishu (Challa) Leitz; Challenge winner/Immune: Heidi Muston; Immune: Dave Patera, Peter Egede, Rita Igbinoba; Bottom three: Camilo Chavez III, Foo Nguyen, and Nico (Cosereanu) Savoré; Eliminated: Camilo Chavez III
307	7	"Team Pitch to Plate"	May 27, 2026	MCH-1607	N/A
Team Challenge: For their first team challenge, the top 18 have to cook lunch for 100 young soccer players part of the U.S. Soccer Forward foundation as well as their coach and manager Mauricio Pochettino. Heidi has the advantage of choosing which territories to pair up with for this challenge. She pairs Africa with The Americas, forming the Red Team with Dave as the captain, while Europe and Asia-Pacific make up the Blue Team with Ted as the captain. The Red Team wins the challenge and Dave wins the immunity pin and an advantage in the upcoming challenge. Ted, Daniel, and Nico are deemed as the bottom three. Ted is eliminated.; Immune: Heidi Muston; Challenge winners/Immune: Britny Underwood, Dave Patera, Heidi Muston, Jake Kelley, Maria Bourland, Peter Egede, Rita Igbinoba, and Tkaiya Dryden; Bottom three: Daniel Meng, Nico (Cosereanu) Savoré, and Ted Pappas; Eliminated: Ted Pappas
308	8	"World Cup Cookoff"	June 3, 2026	MCH-1608	N/A
Elimination Challenge: The top 17 arrive in the kitchen to a cookout like setup and a TV. In honor of the World Cup, the contestants are tasked with sixty minutes to make a dish that would be eaten to watch the game. The winner of the challenge would receive the immunity pin as well as a $2500 gift card to Home Depot. Dave was revealed to have the advantage of giving one contestant a “red card” halfway through the cook saving them from elimination. At the halfway mark, Dave decides to give the red card to Rita thereby saving her. The top four dishes belong to Jaime, Julia, Heidi and Tkaiya. Jaime wins earning her the immunity pin, the gift card and immunity for the rest of her territory. Nico, Peter, and Maria are the bottom three. Peter is saved first due to making a good dish just being on the bottom by default. Nico is eliminated.; Immune: Dave Patera and Rita Igbinoba; Challenge winner/Immune: Jaime Horan (Tan); Immune: Aishu (Challa) Leitz, Daniel Meng, Foo Nguyen, and Shompa Kabir-Furqan; Bottom three: Maria Bourland, Nico (Cosereanu) Savoré, and Peter Egede; Eliminated: Nico (Cosereanu) Savoré
309	9	"Bitter Sweet Mystery Box"	July 15, 2026	MCH-1609	N/A
Mystery Box Challenge: The top 16 face another mystery box challenge where they will have 75 minutes to make a dish using chocolate, incorporating their heritage on a plate. The winner of the challenge will win the immunity pin as well as kitchen tools from OXO. It is also announced that two cooks will be eliminated after this challenge. Jaime has the advantage of giving one territory five extra minutes to cook, giving them 80 minutes, and another territory five less minutes, giving them 70 minutes. She chooses Asia-Pacific to have 80 minutes and Africa to have 70 minutes. The top four dishes belong to Shompa, Julia, Rita, and Jake. Julia wins the challenge, earning the immunity pin, the OXO cookware, and saving Europe from elimination. The bottom three dishes belong to Daniel, Peter, and Britny. Peter is saved, sending Daniel and Britny home.; Immune: Jaime Horan (Tan); Challenge winner/Immune: Julia Cili; Immune: Aghata Sunsi and Basia Newman; Bottom three: Britny Underwood, Daniel Meng, and Peter Egede; Eliminated: Britny Underwood and Daniel Meng
310	10	"Wheel of Fusion"	July 22, 2026	MCH-1610	N/A
Elimination Challenge: The top 14 enter the kitchen to find a giant spinning wheel with many different types of cuisines on it. The judges announce that each territory will pick one representative to spin the wheel and whatever cuisine it lands on, they must fuse that country's cuisine with the cuisine of their own culture in 60 minutes. Upon spinning, Asia-Pacific gets assigned French, Europe gets Japanese, The Americas get Nigerian, and Africa gets Greek. As Julia's advantage for winning the previous challenge, she is able to switch what cuisine a territory has to fuse their dishes with. She switches Africa from Greek to Australian. The top four dishes belong to Aishu, Aghata, Peter and Maria. Maria wins earning her immunity for herself and the rest of her territory. The bottom three dishes belong to Shompa, Basia and Rita. The judges decide to eliminate both Shompa and Rita.; Immune: Julia Cili; Challenge winner/Immune: Maria Bourland; Immune: Jake Kelley, Tkaiya Dryden; Bottom three: Basia Newman, Rita Igbinoba, and Shompa Kabir-Furquan; Eliminated: Rita Igbinoba and Shompa Kabir-Furquan
311	11	"Royal Wedding"	July 29, 2026	MCH-1611	N/A
Team Challenge: The top 12 arrive at the Casa Loma where they will be catering the wedding of season 15 winners, Jesse & Jessica. They are required to serve a scallop appetizer and a duck entree. Maria has the advantage of choosing which territory to pair up with. She chooses Africa, forming the Blue Team, while Europe and Asia-Pacific form the Red Team. The judges tell Maria that since she has immunity, she can’t be the captain, then they select Peter as the Blue Team captain and select Aishu and Aghata as the candidates for the Red Team captain which Aishu ends up volunteering. The Blue Team wins the challenge. Jaime and Aghata are singled out as the bottom two. The judges eliminate Aghata.; Immune: Maria Bourland; Challenge winners/Immune: Dave Petera, Heidi Muston, Jake Kelley, Maria Bourland, Peter Egede, and Tkaiya Dryden; Bottom two: Aghata Sunsi and Jaime Horan (Tan); Eliminated: Aghata Sunsi
312	12	"Global Feed"	August 5, 2026	MCH-1612	N/A
Mystery Box Challenge: The top 11 face another mystery box challenge where they must make a dish that has the potential to go viral on social media. It is also stated that there are no more immunity pins in play. Internet personality, Nick DiGiovanni appears as a special guest judge for this challenge and announces that the winner of this challenge will get an opportunity to collaborate in one of his videos. The top four dishes belong to Jaime, Julia, Dave, and Jake. Julia wins the challenge, saving her territory from elimination and getting the opportunity to work with Nick. The bottom three dishes belong to Foo, Peter and Maria. Maria is eliminated.; Challenge winner/Immune: Julia Cili; Immune: Basia Newman; Bottom three: Foo Nguyen, Maria Bourland, and Peter Egede; Eliminated: Maria Bourland
313	13	"Tag Team"	August 12, 2026	MCH-1613	N/A
Team Challenge: In honor of the upcoming DreamWorks Animation film, Forgotten Island, the top 10 face the annual Tag Team Challenge where they must replicate three dishes based on the judges’ most cherished food memories. It is announced that both cooks from the worst performing team will be leaving after this challenge, so the judges let everyone choose their own partner for this challenge. The pairs are Aishu and Jaime (Red Team), Basia and Foo (Yellow Team), Heidi and Julia (Blue Team), Dave and Jake (Pink Team), and Peter and Tkaiya (Grey Team). The top two teams are the Grey and Pink Teams and the Pink Team wins the challenge, earning an advantage in the next challenge and winning tickets to the premiere of Forgotten Island. The Red, Yellow, and Blue Teams are called forward as the bottom six. The Blue Team is saved first, then the judges eliminate the Red Team.; Challenge winners/Immune: Dave Patera and Jake Kelley; Bottom six: Aishu (Challa) Leitz, Basia Newman, Foo Nguyen, Heidi Muston, Jaime Horan (Tan), and Julia Cili; Eliminated: Aishu (Challa) Leitz and Jaime Horan (Tan)
314	14	"The Wall"	August 19, 2026	MCH-1614	N/A
Team Challenge: The top eight compete in the Wall Challenge where they will work in pairs to make dishes that look and taste identical. The judges also warn that two home cooks will be sent home after this challenge and that they don't have to be from the same team. Dave and Jake get to choose the teams, but they are first given the option to cook as a pair again after winning the Tag Team Challenge, but they opt to split up and form new pairs. The pairs are Dave and Heidi (Red Team), Jake and Julia (Yellow Team), Tkaiya and Basia (Blue Team), and Peter and Foo (Pink Team). The Red Team wins the challenge, while the Yellow Team also does enough to be safe. The Blue and Pink Teams are the bottom four. The judges eliminate Foo and Tkaiya.; Challenge winners/Immune: Dave Patera and Heidi Muston; Bottom four: Basia Newman, Foo Nguyen, Peter Egede, and Tkaiya Dryden; Eliminated: Foo Nguyen and Tkaiya Dryden
315	15	"Restaurant Takeover"	August 26, 2026	MCH-1615	N/A
Team Challenge: The top six arrive at Cluny Bistro & Boulangerie to face the annual Restaurant Takeover Challenge. Julia, Heidi, and Jake are assigned to the Blue Team, while Basia, Peter, and Dave are assigned to the Red Team. The Blue Team selects Jake as their captain, while the Red Team selects Basia as their captain. The Blue Team wins the challenge and Jake wins the final advantage of the season. The Red Team members are the bottom three by default. The judges eliminate Dave.; Challenge winners/Immune: Heidi Muston, Jake Kelley, and Julia Cili; Bottom three: Basia Newman, Dave Patera, and Peter Egede; Eliminated: Dave Patera
316	16	"Keeping Up With Gordon and Tiffany"	September 2, 2026	MCH-1616	N/A
317	17	"Finale Part 1"	September 9, 2026	MCH-1617	N/A
318	18	"Finale Part 2"	September 16, 2026	MCH-1618	N/A
