= MasterChef (American TV series) season 15 =

2025 season of television series

MasterChef: Dynamic Duos
- Season 15
- Promotional poster for season 15, featuring (L to R) judges Joe Bastianich, Gordon Ramsay, and Tiffany Derry
- Judges: Gordon Ramsay; Joe Bastianich; Tiffany Derry
- No. of contestants: 12 duos (24 total)
- Winners: Jessica Bosworth & Jesse Rosenwald
- Runners-up: Rachel Sanchez & Julio Figueredo and Tina Duong & Aivan Tran
- No. of episodes: 18

Release
- Original network: Fox
- Original release: May 21 – September 17, 2025

Season chronology
- ← Previous; Season 14 Next → Season 16

The fifteenth season of the American competitive reality television series MasterChef (also known as MasterChef: Dynamic Duos) premiered on Fox on May 21, 2025. Gordon Ramsay and Joe Bastianich returned as judges, while Tiffany Derry joined the cast as the third judge, replacing Aarón Sánchez.

The season was won by Jessica Bosworth and Jesse Rosenwald, with Rachel Sanchez and Julio Figueredo & Tina Duong and Aivan Tran as the runners-up.

== Production ==
The series was confirmed for a fifteenth season renewal on May 13, 2024. On April 8, 2025, it was announced that the season's theme would feature contestants competing as pairs for the first time ever for the trophy, the title, and $250,000. It was also revealed that Tiffany Derry would replace judge Aarón Sánchez, alongside returning judges Gordon Ramsay and Joe Bastianich. It was later revealed that the season would premiere on May 21, 2025.

The season was filmed from November to December 2024, with production being moved to Melbourne, Australia from its previous MasterChef soundstage in Los Angeles, utilizing the set of the Australian series at the Melbourne Showgrounds in Ascot Vale, Victoria for the first time.

== Contestants ==
Note: Contestant details are as shown in graphics in the show except where cited.

Contestants	City	Relationship	Status
Jessica Bosworth & Jesse Rosenwald	Boston, Massachusetts	Long Term Relationship	Winners September 17
Rachel Sanchez & Julio Figueredo	Naples, Florida	Married	Runners-up September 17
Tina Duong & Aivan Tran	Fountain Valley, California / Fairplay, Colorado	Aunt & Niece	Runners-up September 17
Zach & Michelle Lamb	Minneapolis, Minnesota	Married	Eliminated September 3
Azu & Javier Cierco	Miami Beach, Florida / Miami, Florida	Divorced Exes	Eliminated August 27
Adam & Joel Head	Athens, Georgia	Brothers	Eliminated August 20
Timothy Cartwright & Athena Phillips	Bowie, Maryland	Newlyweds	Eliminated August 6
Tonna & Cait Jacobson	Brandon, South Dakota	Mother & Daughter	Eliminated July 30
Kayla Mitchell & Ryan Kate Brandenburg	Moriches, New York / Grapevine, Texas	MasterChef Junior Besties	Eliminated July 16
Darce Olund & Courtney Fraley	Chicago, Illinois	Animal ER Nurses	Eliminated July 9
Ashley & Ricky Napoli	Orlando, Florida / Buffalo, New York	Siblings	Eliminated June 18
Kevin Fuller & Trey Wade	New Bern, North Carolina / Charlotte, North Carolina	Best Friends	Eliminated June 11

== Elimination table ==
Place	Duos	Episodes												
Place	Duos	4	5	6	7	8	9	10	11	12	13	14	15	17/18
1	Jessica & Jesse	IN	HIGH	WIN	IMM	HIGH	WIN	IMM	IN	WIN	IMM	HIGH	IN	WINNERS
2	Rachel & Julio	IN	WIN	WIN	IMM	WIN	LOW	PT	IN	LOW	LOW	IN	WIN	RUNNERS-UP
2	Tina & Aivan	HIGH	HIGH	WIN	IMM	HIGH	WIN	IMM	LOW	WIN	IMM	LOW	LOW	RUNNERS-UP
4	Zach & Michelle	WIN	LOW	WIN	IMM	LOW	LOW	PT	HIGH	LOW	PT	HIGH	ELIM	
5	Azu & Javier	IN	LOW	LOW	PT	IN	WIN	IMM	HIGH	WIN	IMM	ELIM		
6	Adam & Joel	HIGH	IN	WIN	IMM	IN	WIN	IMM	WIN	LOW	ELIM			
7	Timothy & Athena	IN	IN	LOW	LOW	IN	LOW	LOW	ELIM					
8	Tonna & Cait	LOW	IN	LOW	PT	LOW	LOW	ELIM						
9	Kayla & Ryan Kate	IN	IN	LOW	PT	ELIM								
10	Darce & Courtney	LOW	IN	LOW	ELIM									
11	Ashley & Ricky	IN	ELIM											
12	Kevin & Trey	ELIM												

(WINNERS) This duo won the competition.
(RUNNERS-UP) This duo finished as a runner-up in the finals.
(WIN) The duo won the individual challenge (Mystery Box Challenge/Skills Test or Elimination Test).
(WIN) The duo was on the winning team in the Team Challenge and directly advanced to the next round.
(HIGH) The duo was one of the top entries in the individual challenge but didn't win.
(HIGH) The duo was one of the top entries in the Team Challenge.
(IN) The duo wasn't selected as a top or bottom entry in an individual challenge.
(PT) The duo was on the losing team in the Team Challenge, competed in the Pressure Test, and advanced.
(NPT) The duo was on the losing team in the Team Challenge, but was exempt from the Pressure Test.
(IN) The duo wasn't selected as a top or bottom entry in a team challenge.
(IMM) The duo didn't have to compete in that round of the competition and was safe from elimination.
(IMM) The duo had to compete in that round of the competition but was safe from elimination.
(IMM) The cook was selected by the winner of the previous challenge and didn't have to compete in the Elimination Test.
(LOW) The duo was one of the bottom entries in the Team Challenge and they advanced.
(LOW) The duo was one of the bottom entries in an individual challenge, and was the last person to advance.
(ELIM) The duo was eliminated from MasterChef.

== Episodes ==
No. overall	No. in season	Title	Original release date	Prod. code	U.S. viewers (millions)
283	1	"The Audition Battles"	May 21, 2025	MCH-1501	1.31
Ramsay and Bastianich welcome the contestants and introduce new judge Tiffany Derry. They explain that this will be the first season the contestants will be competing as pairs for the prize. For the qualifying round, pairs will compete against each other with only one pair advancing to the competition. In the first contest, dating couple Jesse & Jessica compete against married couple Zach & Michelle, with Zach & Michelle advancing. Next up, aunt and niece Tina & Aivan compete against cousins Shanda & Asa, with Tina & Aivan advancing. In the third and final battle of the day, divorced exes Azu & Javier compete against newlyweds Athena & Timothy, and Athena & Timothy qualify for the next round.
284	2	"The Audition Battles Continue"	May 28, 2025	MCH-1502	1.72
The audition battles begin tonight with two teams of best friends, Courtney & Darce who are both ER vets and best friends and Ryan Kate & Kayla who became best friends after meeting in season three of MasterChef Junior. Ryan Kate & Kayla are awarded aprons. Best friends Kevin & Trey and firefighters Javi & Luis audition next. Kevin & Trey win the aprons. In a highlight reel, mother and daughter Tonna & Cait defeat 'Glammas' Lisa & Milah and married couple Julio & Rachel defeat another married couple, Spencer & McKenna. The final audition battle is between two sets of siblings: Ashley & Ricky and Adam & Joel. In a close decision, the judges choose Ashley & Ricky.
285	3	"Second Chance Battles"	June 4, 2025	MCH-1503	1.73
The top eight are surprised to learn that the other eight duos that failed their audition have been given a second chance. They will have 45 minutes to make any dish of their choice, and three identical plates must be served. Four pairs of aprons will be given, and the other four duos will be eliminated for good. After tasting, the judges decide Azu & Javier, Adam & Joel, Courtney & Darce, and Jessica & Jesse made the best dishes, earning them aprons, leading to the second eliminations of Javi & Luis, Lisa & Milah, Shanda & Asa, and Spencer & McKenna.
286	4	"Dinner Party Dish"	June 11, 2025	MCH-1504	1.69
Elimination Challenge: The top 12 duos are challenged to make their best dish that would be served at a dinner party in 60 minutes. Joe announces the top three and bottom three dishes would be tasted; the winning duo will receive an advantage in the next challenge. During the challenge, Kayla severely cut herself and had to be removed from the kitchen to go to the ER after the challenge. The top three duos are Tina & Aivan, Michelle & Zach and Adam & Joel. The judges decide that Michelle & Zach are the winning duo, earning them the advantage. The bottom three dishes belong to Kevin & Trey, Darce & Courtney, and Tonna & Cait. Kevin & Trey are eliminated.; Challenge winners: Zach & Michelle Lamb; Bottom three: Kevin Fuller & Trey Wade, Darce Orlund & Courtney Fraley, and Tonna & Cait Jacobson; Eliminated: Kevin Fuller & Trey Wade
287	5	"Mister-y & Mrs. Box"	June 18, 2025	MCH-1505	1.90
Mystery Box Challenge: The top 11 duos find two mystery boxes on their station, and discover that one box contains sweet ingredients while the other contains spicy ingredients. The teams must combine at least two ingredients from each box into their dish, with the winning team getting an advantage in the next round. For their advantage, Michelle & Zach get to assign the proteins for each team; each team gets 60 minutes to prepare their dish. The top three dishes belong to Jessica & Jesse, Rachel & Julio, and Tina & Aivan. The winning dish goes to Rachel & Julio. The bottom three dishes belong to Azu & Javier, Ashley & Ricky, and Zach & Michelle. The team of Ashley & Ricky are eliminated.; Challenge winners: Rachel Sanchez & Julio Figueredo; Bottom three: Azu & Javier Cierco, Ashley & Ricky Napoli, and Zach & Michelle Lamb; Eliminated: Ashley & Ricky Napoli
288	6	"Pier Pressure"	June 25, 2025	MCH-1506	1.81
Team Challenge: The top 10 duos face their first team challenge where they have to make a hearty lunch for 101 fishermen and their families at Gem Pier in Williamstown. Rachel and Julio have the advantage of choosing their teammates. They choose Adam & Joel, Tina & Aivan, Jessica & Jesse, and Zach & Michelle, forming the Red Team with Rachel & Julio as the team captains, leaving the other five duos as the Blue Team with Timothy & Athena as the captains. Toward the end of the cook, Ryan Kate collapsed due to dehydration and had to be removed from the challenge, therefore was unable to hear the results as well. The Red Team are declared the winners, leaving the Blue Team to face the dreaded pressure test.; Challenge winners/Immune: Adam & Joel Head, Jessica Bosworth & Jesse Rosenwald, Rachel Sanchez & Julio Figueredo, Tina Duong & Aivan Tran, and Zach & Michelle Lamb
289	7	"Mystery Box"	July 9, 2025	MCH-1507	1.81
Pressure Test: The five losing duos from the previous team challenge find mystery boxes at their stations. When they lift them up there is a mallet in the mystery box. The judges reveal the mystery box is made of golden chocolate and the mallet is so they can smash the chocolate. The duos are tasked to make chocolate desserts which also must include the mystery box chocolate. They will have 75 minutes. After the tasting Tonna & Cait and Ryan Kate & Kayla were announced to have the best desserts. Azu & Javier also did enough to advance. Athena & Timothy and Courtney & Darce were the bottom two teams. Courtney & Darce were the next duo to be eliminated.; Bottom two: Timothy Cartwright & Athena Phillips and Darce Orlund & Courtney Fraley; Eliminated: Darce Orlund & Courtney Fraley
290	8	"Recipe Telephone"	July 16, 2025	MCH-1508	1.72
Elimination Challenge: The top nine duos arrive and the judges announce a new first of its kind challenge: 'Recipe Telephone'. The duos will have 60 minutes to prepare a recipe; however, one half of the duo will conceptualize and start the dish, and the other half will finish it. The non-cooking half of the duo will be brought to a holding room. They will switch with 30 minutes left. The first cooking half of the duo will be responsible for providing 'culinary clues' to set their partner up for success. The second cooking half will be responsible for finishing the dish and interpreting the clues. Adam, Athena, Javier, Jesse, Julio, Michelle, Ryan Kate, Tina and Tonna will start cooking while the other half will sit in the holding room. The top three are Jessica & Jesse, Rachel & Julio and Tina & Aivan. Rachel & Julio win and won a dinner at all three judges' restaurants. The worst dishes belong to Tonna & Cait, Michelle & Zach and Ryan Kate & Kayla. Ryan Kate & Kayla are eliminated.; Challenge winners: Rachel Sanchez & Julio Figueredo; Bottom three: Tonna & Cait Jacobson, Zach & Michelle Lamb and Ryan Kate Brandenberg & Kayla Mitchell.; Eliminated: Ryan Kate Brandenberg & Kayla Mitchell
291	9	"Train to Table"	July 23, 2025	MCH-1509	1.56
Team Challenge: The top eight duos face their next team challenge where they are tasked with cooking a two-course fine dining experience consisting of an amuse-bouche and an entrée for over 60 guests. The amuse-bouche will be served to the VIPs onboard a moving train with one duo from each team being responsible for making them. The Red Team consists of Zach & Michelle, Tonna & Cait, Timothy & Athena, and Rachel & Julio with Zach & Michelle as the captains, while the Blue Team consists of Jessica & Jesse, Azu & Javier, Adam & Joel, & Tina & Aivan with Jessica & Jesse as the captains. From each team, Rachel & Julio and Adam & Joel volunteer to serve the amuse-bouche on the train. The Blue Team wins the challenge, sending the Red Team to the pressure test.; Challenge winners/Immune: Adam & Joel Head, Azu & Javier Cierco, Jessica Bosworth & Jesse Rosenwald, and Tina Duong & Aivan Tran
292	10	"The Great Ingredient Bid Off"	July 30, 2025	MCH-1510	1.70
Pressure Test: The losing duos from the previous challenge will face a pressure test. Gordon reveals that the contestants will bid on ingredients with time rather than money. Every duo starts with 90 minutes. They will bid on proteins, produce, and pantry items. The first auction is on proteins; Timothy and Athena buy salmon with 45 minutes, Rachel and Julio buy chicken with 30 minutes, Tonna & Cait buy lamb for 5 minutes, and Michelle & Zach get eggs for free. Next they must bid on produce; Zach & Michelle buy leafy greens and onions with 15 minutes, Tonna & Cait buy root vegetables with 20 minutes, Rachel & Julio buy tomatoes and peppers for 20 minutes, and Timothy & Athena get fruit for free. The final auction is on pantry items; Zach & Michelle buy spices with 20 minutes leaving them with 55 minutes to cook, Timothy & Athena buy herbs leaving them with 20 minutes, Tonna & Cait buy flavor bombs giving them 50 minutes, and Rachel & Julio get grains for free keeping them at 40 minutes. Rachel & Julio and Zach & Michelle made the best dishes and were safe leaving Timothy & Athena and Tonna & Cait as the bottom two. The judges eliminate Tonna & Cait.; Bottom two: Timothy Cartwright & Athena Phillips and Tonna & Cait Jacobson; Eliminated: Tonna & Cait Jacobson
293	11	"Macaron Mayhem"	August 6, 2025	MCH-1511	1.57
Elimination Challenge: The top seven duos walk into the kitchen and discover various displays of macaron towers. The judges announce the duos must make macaron towers featuring two flavors and 80 macarons in all in 90 minutes. After cooking the judges announce every duo will have their macarons tasted. Adam & Joel, Azu & Javier and Zach & Michelle are named the top three and Adam & Joel win earning them the final advantage of the season. Tina & Aivan and Athena & Timothy are named the bottom two. Athena & Timothy are sent home.; Challenge winners: Adam & Joel Head; Bottom two: Timothy Cartwright & Athena Phillips and Tina Duong & Aivan Tran; Eliminated: Timothy Cartwright & Athena Phillips
294	12	"Backyard BBQ"	August 13, 2025	MCH-1512	1.60
Team Challenge: The top six duos face their final team challenge of the season where they have to cook a restaurant quality barbecue plate for over 40 people. Adam & Joel won the challenge last time, so they get the advantage of choosing their whole team. They choose Rachel & Julio and Zach & Michelle, leaving the other three duos as the Blue Team. Adam & Joel are the Red Team captains, while Tina & Aivan are the Blue Team captains. One team will cook a dish using a bone-in ribeye, while the other team had to use a bone-in pork chop. They decided with a coin toss which Adam & Joel won, meaning they got to choose what they use. They chose the ribeye, leaving the Blue Team with the pork chop. The Blue Team won the challenge, sending the Red Team members to face the final pressure test of the season.; Challenge winners/Immune: Azu & Javier Cierco, Jessica Bosworth & Jesse Rosenwald, and Tina Duong & Aivan Tran
295	13	"Divide & Conquer"	August 20, 2025	MCH-1513	1.60
Pressure Test: For their final pressure test, the Red Team members had to make three signature dishes by the judges consisting of Joe’s Egg Yolk Raviolo appetizer, Tiffany’s Pan Seared Scallop entree, and Gordon’s sticky toffee pudding dessert. Tiffany then gave the duos a demonstration on how to make her dish. Zach & Michelle were the best duo, leaving Adam & Joel and Rachel & Julio as the bottom two. Adam & Joel are eliminated.; Bottom two: Adam & Joel Head and Rachel Sanchez & Julio Figueredo; Eliminated: Adam & Joel Head
296	14	"The Wall"	August 27, 2025	MCH-1514	1.54
Elimination Challenge: The top five duos are tasked with making identical dishes while cooking on opposite sides of a giant wall. They will have 60 minutes to cook their dishes, but before the cook, they're given five minutes in the pantry to discuss what they want to make, as they will not be allowed back in the pantry after their five minutes is up. Tiffany also mentions that in the pantry, there's a limited stock range of protein, which means that if the team doesn't get the protein they want, they'll have to choose a different one. Zach & Michelle and Jessica & Jesse have the best dishes, while Rachel & Julio also do enough to advance. The judges eliminate Azu & Javier.; Bottom two: Azu & Javier Cierco and Tina Duong & Aivan Tran; Eliminated: Azu & Javier Cierco
297	15	"Keeping Up With Gordon - Tag Team Style!"	September 3, 2025	MCH-1515	1.46
Elimination Challenge: The semifinalists are faced with the tag-team challenge and must also cook alongside judge Gordon Ramsay. In their pairs, contestants must recreate a dish from the menu of Restaurant Gordon Ramsay - buckwheat-crusted duck breast, switching every five minutes. The contestants will also have 30 seconds to plate once Gordon finishes cooking. Rachel & Julio are deemed to have the best dish, and are the first pair to advance to the finals. Jessica & Jesse's performance also earns them a spot in the finals. Finally, Tina & Aivan are chosen as the last pair of finalists, eliminating Zach & Michelle.; Challenge Winners: Rachel Sanchez & Julio Figueredo, Jessica Bosworth & Jesse Rosenwald, and Tina Duong & Aivan Tran; Eliminated: Zach & Michelle Lamb
298	16	"Road to the Finale"	September 10, 2025	MCH-1516	1.28
299	17	"Grand Finale, Part 1"	September 17, 2025	MCH-1517	1.55
300	18	"Grand Finale, Part 2"	September 17, 2025	MCH-1518	1.55
