= MasterChef (American TV series) season 13 =

Season of television series

MasterChef: United Tastes of America
- Season 13
- Promotional poster for season 13, featuring (L to R) judges Joe Bastianich, Gordon Ramsay, and Aarón Sánchez
- Judges: Gordon Ramsay; Aarón Sánchez; Joe Bastianich
- No. of contestants: 20
- Winner: Grant Gillon
- Runners-up: Jennifer Maune; Kennedy Underwood
- No. of episodes: 20

Release
- Original network: Fox
- Original release: May 24 – September 20, 2023

Season chronology
- ← Previous; Season 12 Next → Season 14

The thirteenth season of the American competitive reality television series MasterChef (also known as MasterChef: United Tastes of America) premiered on Fox on May 24, 2023, and concluded on September 20, 2023. Gordon Ramsay, Aarón Sánchez, and Joe Bastianich all returned as judges.

The season was won by brewery sales director Grant Gillon, with lifestyle blogger Jennifer Maune and festival vendor Kennedy Underwood finishing as co-runners-up.

== Production ==
On September 14, 2022, it was announced that the series had been renewed for a thirteenth season, with judges Bastianich, Ramsay, and Sánchez announced to be returning as well. On March 29, 2023, it was announced that the season would premiere on May 24, 2023. The season's theme featured the contestants competing in groups representing four regions of the United States — West, Northeast, Midwest and South.

== Contestants ==
Contestant	Age	Hometown	Occupation	Region	Status
Grant Gillon	32	Altoona, Iowa	Brewery sales director	Midwest	Winner September 20
Jennifer Maune	42	Little Rock, Arkansas	Lifestyle blogger	South	Runners-up September 20
Kennedy Underwood	26	Denver, Colorado	Festival vendor	West	Runners-up September 20
Reagan Sidney	44	New Orleans, Louisiana	Paralegal	South	Eliminated September 13
Wayne Lewis	51	Columbus, Ohio	Media company owner	Midwest	Eliminated September 13
Savannah "Sav" Miles	26	Gadsden, Alabama	Farm owner	South	Eliminated September 13
Brynn Weaver	33	Providence, Rhode Island	Bartender	Northeast	Eliminated September 6
Kolby Chandler	30	Houston, Texas	Entrepreneur	South	Eliminated September 6
"MD" Madame Donut	48	Maui, Hawaii	Donut shop owner	West	Eliminated September 6
Lizzie Hartman	29	Fairbanks, Alaska	Preschool teacher's aid	West	Eliminated August 30
James Barfield	31	Portland, Oregon	Mushroom jerky manufacturer	West	Eliminated August 30
Charles Calvino	34	Columbus, Ohio	Hairstylist	Midwest	Eliminated August 23
Nina Interlandi Bell	44	Woolwich, Maine	Marketing manager	Northeast	Eliminated August 23
Kendal Adair	27	Olive Branch, Mississippi	Trucking company owner	South	Eliminated August 16
Kyle Hopkins	41	Kansas City, Missouri	Cicerone	Midwest	Eliminated August 9
Purvi Dogra	48	East Windsor, New Jersey	Credit & collection manager	Northeast	Eliminated August 2
Sarah Fry	32	Springfield, Missouri	Social media manager	Midwest	Eliminated August 2
Ryan Walker	33	Millstone Township, New Jersey	Construction superintendent	Northeast	Eliminated July 19
Richie Jones-Muhammad	28	Silver Spring, Maryland	Music producer	Northeast	Eliminated July 12
Amanda Clark Katz	44	Sherman Oaks, California	Stay-at-home mom	West	Eliminated June 21

Contestant details are as shown in graphics in the show except where cited.

== Elimination table ==
Place	Contestant	Episode															
Place	Contestant	5	6	7	8	9	10	11	12	13	14	15	16	17	18		19/20
1	Grant	IMM	IN	WIN	HIGH	IN	WIN	WIN	IMM	LOW	LOW	IN	WIN	IN	WIN	WIN	WINNER
2	Jennifer	IN	WIN	IMM	LOW	IMM	IN	IN	LOW	IN	HIGH	IN	LOW	IN	WIN	LOW	RUNNERS-UP
2	Kennedy	IN	HIGH	IN	WIN	IMM	IN	IN	IN	HIGH	IN	LOW	HIGH	WIN	LOW	HIGH	RUNNERS-UP
4	Reagan	HIGH	IMM	WIN	IN	IMM	LOW	IN	IN	IN	IN	IMM	LOW	WIN	WIN	ELIM	
5	Wayne	IMM	HIGH	WIN	IN	HIGH	WIN	LOW	IN	WIN	IMM	WIN	WIN	WIN	ELIM		
6	Sav	IN	IMM	WIN	IN	IMM	LOW	IN	WIN	IMM	IN	LOW	HIGH	ELIM			
7	Brynn	IN	IN	LOW	HIGH	HIGH	WIN	HIGH	IN	IN	WIN	IMM	ELIM				
7	Kolby	IN	IMM	WIN	IN	WIN	IMM	HIGH	HIGH	HIGH	LOW	IN	ELIM				
9	MD	IN	IN	IN	IMM	LOW	WIN	IN	WIN	IMM	HIGH	ELIM					
10	Lizzie	IN	LOW	IN	IMM	HIGH	WIN	IN	HIGH	LOW	ELIM						
11	James	HIGH	IN	LOW	IMM	IN	WIN	IN	IN	ELIM							
12	Charles	IMM	LOW	WIN	IN	IN	WIN	LOW	ELIM								
13	Nina	HIGH	HIGH	IN	IN	LOW	IN	ELIM									
14	Kendal	LOW	IMM	WIN	HIGH	IMM	ELIM										
15	Kyle	WIN	IMM	WIN	IN	ELIM											
16	Purvi	IN	IN	IN	ELIM												
16	Sarah	IMM	IN	WIN	ELIM												
18	Ryan	IN	IN	ELIM													
19	Richie	LOW	ELIM														
20	Amanda	ELIM															

(WINNER) This cook won the competition.
(RUNNER-UP) This cook finished as a runner-up in the finals.
(WIN) The cook won the individual challenge (Mystery Box Challenge/Skills Test or Elimination Test).
(WIN) The cook was on the winning team in the Team Challenge and directly advanced to the next round.
(HIGH) The cook was one of the top entries in the individual challenge but didn't win.
(HIGH) The cook was one of the top entries in the Team Challenge.
(IN) The cook wasn't selected as a top or bottom entry in an individual challenge.
(IN) The cook wasn't selected as a top or bottom entry in a team challenge.
(IMM) The cook didn't have to compete in that round of the competition and was safe from elimination.
(IMM) The cook had to compete in that round of the competition but was safe from elimination.
(IMM) The cook was selected by the winner of the previous challenge and didn't have to compete in the Elimination Test.
(LOW) The cook was one of the bottom entries in an individual challenge, and was the last person to advance.
(LOW) The cook was one of the bottom entries in the Team Challenge and they advanced.
(ELIM) The cook was eliminated from MasterChef.

== Episodes ==
No. overall	No. in season	Title	Original release date	Prod. code	U.S. viewers (millions)
244	1	"Regional Auditions - The Northeast"	May 24, 2023	MCH-1301	1.63
The contestants must get at least three yes votes this season to earn an apron, and in today's episode it is contestants from the Northeast region. Daphne Oz is the guest judge. The first contestant competing for an apron is Carla and she does not advance. Richie is the next contestant and he advances with three yes votes. Nina is next and earns three yes votes and an apron. Purvi is next and her dish impressed all four judges earning her an apron. Eddie is next and only gets two yes votes therefore he did not advance; however, Joe offers him training in some of his restaurants after the show. Ross also fails his audition. Brynn is next and earns four yes votes and an apron. Ryan is the day's last auditionee and gets three yes votes earning him the final apron for the Northeast region.
245	2	"Regional Auditions - The Midwest"	May 31, 2023	MCH-1302	2.25
The Midwest region contestants begin their auditions, with Graham Elliot joining as the guest judge. Grant is the first contestant up and gets three yes votes and the first apron. Sarah is next and also gets three yes votes and an apron. Kevin gets two no votes to start with and does not advance. Yomira is next, and while it is not stated how many no votes she received, she does not earn an apron. Marquela is next and has the same negative result. Charles is next and gets four yes votes and the third apron of the night. Wayne is next and also gets four yes votes and an apron. Kyle and Trevor have their auditions shown intermingled with each other, in the end Trevor does not earn an apron but Kyle does.
246	3	"Regional Auditions - The West"	June 7, 2023	MCH-1303	2.29
The West region contestants begin their auditions. This week the guest judge is Susan Feniger. Lizzie is the first contestant to audition and she earns four yes votes earning her the night's first apron. Both GiGi and Tyson fail their auditions. Amanda is next earning three out of four yes votes earning her the next apron. Megan auditions next and only gets two yes votes. Madame Donut is the next contestant and she gets four yes votes earning her the next apron. Kennedy also gets an apron with four yes votes. James and Calvin have their auditions intermingled; Calvin does not win an apron but James does.
247	4	"Regional Auditions - The South"	June 14, 2023	MCH-1304	2.28
The South region is the final region for auditions, and this week Tiffany Derry joins the judges for the voting. Reagan starts off the auditions and gets four yes votes and the first apron of the night. Austyn is up next but gets two immediate no votes, so she fails. Kendal is next and gets four yes votes for the evening's second apron. Jessica attempts her audition next but she gets two no votes and does not pass. Michele follows with her audition and also gets two no votes thus failing. Jennifer is next and gets three yes votes, breaking the streak of failures and earning the night's third apron. Sav follows with her audition and gets an overwhelming four yes votes and the fourth apron. When Kolby auditions, Gordon brings his grandfather in to taste the dish and witness Kolby being awarded the fifth and final apron.
248	5	"State Fair Food"	June 21, 2023	MCH-1305	2.27
Elimination Challenge: The contestants must cook foods inspired by the state fairs of their region. Whoever cooks the worst dish will be eliminated. The contestants from this point onward will be competing with the other members of their respective regions, and whoever cooks the best dish will be immune next week and will make their entire region safe from elimination tonight. The contestants have 60 minutes to cook. Nina, Reagan, Kyle and James have the top dishes, and Kyle wins the immunity pin, keeping the entire Midwest region safe. The bottom dishes from the other regions belong to Richie, Kendal and Amanda.; Challenge winner/Immune: Kyle Hopkins; Immune: Charles Calvino, Grant Gillon, Sarah Fry and Wayne Lewis; Bottom three: Amanda Clark Katz, Kendal Adair and Richie Jones-Muhammad; Eliminated: Amanda Clark Katz
249	6	"Apple Mystery Box"	July 12, 2023	MCH-1306	2.10
Mystery Box Challenge: The mystery boxes contain apples. Kyle is immune due to winning last week's challenge, and he gets to decide which regions must cook sweet dishes and which must cook savory dishes; he chooses the Midwest and West to cook savory, and the South and Northeast to cook sweet. The best dish will win immunity for themselves next week and immunity for their region this week. The chefs get one hour to cook. Nina, Jennifer, Wayne and Kennedy have the best dishes, and Jennifer wins the immunity pin, saving the South region. The bottom three dishes belong to Richie, Charles and Lizzie.; Immune: Kyle Hopkins; Challenge winner/Immune: Jennifer Maune; Immune: Kendal Adair, Kolby Chandler, Reagan Sidney and Sav Miles; Bottom three: Charles Calvino, Lizzie Hartman and Richie Jones-Muhammad; Eliminated: Richie Jones-Muhammad
250	7	"Trial by Fire: Field Challenge"	July 19, 2023	MCH-1307	1.90
Team Challenge: The contestants are taken to the Ventura County Fire Academy for a field challenge where they must cook a lunch for 101 firefighters and other emergency personnel. Jennifer is immune and gets to choose which regions will be on the two teams; she chooses Midwest to team with South to form the Red Team, leaving West and Northeast on the Blue Team. Jennifer is named captain of the Red Team and Brynn is named captain for the Blue Team. The teams have 75 minutes to cook before the guests arrive, and the judges request a sample plate to be ready in 30 minutes. The Red Team wins the challenge, and Jennifer will have an advantage in the next challenge. James, Ryan and Brynn are called out as the bottom performers.; Immune: Jennifer Maune; Challenge winners: Charles Calvino, Grant Gillon, Jennifer Maune, Kendal Adair, Kolby Chandler, Kyle Hopkins, Reagan Sidney, Sarah Fry, Sav Miles and Wayne Lewis; Bottom three: Brynn Weaver, James Barfield and Ryan Walker; Eliminated: Ryan Walker
251	8	"Birds of a Feather Mystery Box"	August 2, 2023	MCH-1308	1.99
Mystery Box Challenge: There is only one mystery box per region, and each box contains a whole chicken. The regions must choose one person to break down the chicken; the team members must then prepare a dish using that cut of chicken. The chefs get one hour to cook, but Jennifer gets to choose one region that will start ten minutes later; she chooses the Midwest. The best dishes belong to Brynn, Kendal, Grant and Kennedy; and Kennedy wins the challenge, earning the immunity pin for next week and giving the West safety from elimination. The bottom dishes belong to Purvi, Jennifer and Sarah.; Challenge winner/Immune: Kennedy Underwood; Immune: James Barfield, Lizzie Hartman and "MD" Madame Donut; Bottom three: Jennifer Maune, Purvi Dogra and Sarah Fry; Eliminated: Purvi Dogra and Sarah Fry
252	9	"United Cakes of America"	August 9, 2023	MCH-1309	2.11
Elimination Challenge: To celebrate 250 episodes of the show, the judges have the contestants bake a cake from a selection of cakes from across America. Kennedy is immune and chooses which contestant must make which cake. The contestants have 90 minutes to replicate the cake they were assigned. The best cakes belong to Brynn, Kolby, Wayne and Lizzie, with Kolby winning the challenge, earning the immunity pin for himself and saving the South region. The bottom cakes belong to Nina, Kyle and MD.; Immune: Kennedy Underwood; Challenge winner/Immune: Kolby Chandler; Immune: Jennifer Maune, Kendal Adair, Reagan Sidney and Sav Miles; Bottom three: Kyle Hopkins, "MD" Madame Donut and Nina Interlandi Bell; Eliminated: Kyle Hopkins
253	10	"Dodgers Stadium Field Challenge"	August 16, 2023	MCH-1310	1.91
Team Challenge: The contestants are taken to Dodger Stadium with guests Freddie Freeman and his wife, where the contestants are split into two teams and must cook a lunch for 100 kids. The West and Midwest are assigned to the Red Team with James as their captain, while the South and Northeast make the Blue Team with Sav as their captain. Kolby is immune and gets to switch one member from each team, he sends Kennedy to the Blue Team and Brynn to the Red Team. The kids vote for the winners, and the Red Team wins the challenge. Sav, Kendal and Reagan are the bottom performers for the Blue Team.; Immune: Kolby Chandler; Challenge winners: Brynn Weaver, Charles Calvino, Grant Gillon, James Barfield, Lizzie Hartman, "MD" Madame Donut and Wayne Lewis; Bottom three: Kendal Adair, Reagan Sidney and Sav Miles; Eliminated: Kendal Adair
254	11	"Military Rations Mystery Box"	August 23, 2023	MCH-1311	1.98
Mystery Box Challenge: The mystery boxes contain military rations. The judges welcome chef Andre Rush as a guest judge. The contestants will be required to make a dish using at least three of the rations under the boxes. They are also told that there will be no more region teams, meaning everyone will cook individually from now on. The members of the winning team in the last challenge get to go into the pantry first to collect a protein of their choice. The top dishes belong to Grant, Kolby and Brynn, with Grant winning immunity. The bottom three dishes belong to Charles, Nina and Wayne.; Challenge winner/Immune: Grant Gillon; Bottom three: Charles Calvino, Nina Interlandi Bell and Wayne Lewis; Eliminated: Nina Interlandi Bell
255	12	"Tag Team"	August 23, 2023	MCH-1312	1.98
Team Challenge: The remaining contestants face the Tag Team challenge. Grant is safe, but still has to participate and he gets to choose the teams. He pairs Wayne with Reagan (Orange Team), Kennedy with James (Green Team), Jennifer with Charles (Red Team), MD with Sav (Maroon Team), Kolby with Lizzie (Blue Team), leaving himself with Brynn (Grey Team). They are tasked to make a three-course meal in 75 minutes as they take turns cooking and giving directions. The Maroon and Blue Teams are the top four, and the Maroon Team wins, winning two immunity pins. The Red Team is called out as the worst performing team.; Immune: Grant Gillon; Challenge winners/Immune: "MD" Madame Donut and Sav Miles; Bottom two: Charles Calvino and Jennifer Maune; Eliminated: Charles Calvino
256	13	"Fish Out of Water Mystery Box"	August 30, 2023	MCH-1313	1.98
Mystery Box Challenge: MD and Sav are immune this week. The mystery boxes each contain a random type of fish, and the contestants must make a dish featuring their fish in 60 minutes. MD and Sav are allowed to switch two contestants' fishes each; MD switches between Grant and James while Sav switches between Kennedy and Reagan. The top three dishes belong to Wayne, Kolby and Kennedy, and Wayne wins the challenge and the immunity pin for next week. The bottom dishes belong to Grant, Lizzie and James.; Immune: "MD" Madame Donut and Sav Miles; Challenge winner/Immune: Wayne Lewis; Bottom three: Grant Gillon, James Barfield and Lizzie Hartman; Eliminated: James Barfield
257	14	"Kelsey's Stadium Food"	August 30, 2023	MCH-1314	1.98
Elimination Challenge: Season 11 winner Kelsey Murphy joins the chefs to challenge the contestants to cook a dish based on food served at sports stadiums in 60 minutes. Wayne is immune and gets to give a five-minute penalty to any contestant at any time, he eventually chooses Jennifer to have to sit out for five minutes. The top three dishes belong to "MD" Madame Donut, Brynn and Jennifer, and Brynn wins the challenge and the immunity pin for next week. The bottom dishes belong to Kolby, Grant and Lizzie.; Immune: Wayne Lewis; Challenge winner/Immune: Brynn Weaver; Bottom three: Grant Gillon, Kolby Chandler and Lizzie Hartman; Eliminated: Lizzie Hartman
258	15	"Patio Grilling Challenge"	September 6, 2023	MCH-1315	2.17
Elimination Challenge: The contestants must make an elevated dish cooked on an outdoor grill in one hour. Brynn is immune and does not have to cook, and she also gets to choose one other person to be immune; she chooses Reagan. It is announced that beginning with this competition there will be no more immunity given. Wayne wins the challenge, the bottom dishes belong to Sav, MD and Kennedy.; Immune: Brynn Weaver and Reagan Sidney; Challenge winner: Wayne Lewis; Bottom three: Kennedy Underwood, "MD" Madame Donut and Sav Miles; Eliminated: "MD" Madame Donut
259	16	"The Wall"	September 6, 2023	MCH-1316	2.17
Team Challenge: The chefs will be split into pairs and must cook on opposite sides of a wall while making identical dishes, and both members of the losing team will be eliminated. Wayne gets to pick the teams, he pairs Kennedy with Sav (Orange Team), Brynn with Kolby (Blue Team), Jennifer with Reagan (Green Team), leaving Grant to team with himself, forming the Red Team. The teams have one hour to cook their dish with five minutes to plan their dishes in the pantry. The Red Team wins the challenge. The Orange Team are named a top team, leaving the Blue and Green Teams in the bottom.; Challenge winners: Grant Gillon and Wayne Lewis; Bottom four: Brynn Weaver, Jennifer Maune, Kolby Chandler and Reagan Sidney; Eliminated: Brynn Weaver and Kolby Chandler
260	17	"Restaurant Takeover - Hell's Kitchen"	September 13, 2023	MCH-1317	2.05
Team Challenge: The chefs are taken to Harrah's Resort Southern California which has the largest Hell's Kitchen restaurant where they are divided into teams. The teams have been pre-chosen by the judges, Grant and Wayne are the captains due to winning the last challenge. Grant captains the Red Team with Jennifer and Sav, while Wayne captains the Blue Team with Kennedy and Reagan. Each team must cook two appetizers and two entrees from the restaurant's menu and serve them to diners. The Blue Team wins the challenge.; Challenge winners: Kennedy Underwood, Reagan Sidney and Wayne Lewis; Eliminated: Sav Miles
261	18	"Semi-Finals: Pasta & Keeping Up with Gordon"	September 13, 2023	MCH-1318	2.05
Elimination Challenge: The contestants will face two individual elimination challenges, and one contestant will be eliminated in each challenge, leaving three contestants to compete for the finals. In this first challenge, the contestants must make a stuffed pasta dish in 45 minutes based on picking a randomly-chosen flavored pasta. Reagan, Jennifer and Grant make the best pasta dishes.; Challenge winners: Grant Gillon, Jennifer Maune and Reagan Sidney; Eliminated: Wayne Lewis; Elimination Challenge: For the second elimination challenge, the remaining contestants must keep up with Gordon in replicating a dish he prepares with the same steps and timing as Gordon uses. Grant wins this challenge.; Challenge winner: Grant Gillon; Eliminated: Reagan Sidney
262	19	"Finale Part One"	September 20, 2023	MCH-1319	2.44
Finale: The three finalists must prepare and execute a three-course menu consisting of an appetizer, entree and dessert, with one hour to cook each course.; Appetizers: Jennifer serves lobster succotash with sweet corn puree, truffle oil, and champagne caviar vinaigrette. Grant serves ravioli al uovo with morel cream sauce, truffle butter and shaved truffles. Kennedy serves crispy-skinned trout with truffle potatoes, oyster mushrooms, tarragon pea puree, saffron tuile, trout roe and smoked oyster aioli.; The entrees begin cooking as the first hour ends.
263	20	"Finale Part Two"	September 20, 2023	MCH-1320	2.44
Entree: Grant serves pork loin medallions with salmoriglio sauce, agrodolce, celery root puree, and beer-braised fennel and onions. Kennedy serves rabbit saddle with seared rabbit liver, pickled cherries, beets, and a juniper berry sauce. Jennifer serves rack of venison persillade with roasted root vegetables, parsnip and potato puree, and bordelaise sauce.; Dessert: Kennedy serves black sesame cake with dark chocolate ganache, blackberry mousse, and yuzu chocolate snow. Jennifer serves chocolate raspberry mousse cake with chambord-raspberry coulis, crystalized raspberries, and a chocolate mirror glaze. Grant serves torn stout cake with coffee stout mousse, chocolate pizzelle, and a coffee ice cream.; Final three: Grant Gillon, Jennifer Maune and Kennedy Underwood; Grant is named this season's winner, taking home the $250,000, the trophy and the title of MasterChef; MasterChef Winner: Grant Gillon
