= MasterChef (American TV series) season 14 =

Season of television series

MasterChef: Generations
- Season 14
- Promotional poster for season 14, featuring (L to R) judges Aarón Sánchez, Gordon Ramsay, and Joe Bastianich
- Judges: Gordon Ramsay; Aarón Sánchez; Joe Bastianich
- No. of contestants: 20
- Winner: Michael Leonard
- Runners-up: Becca Gibb; Kamay Lafalaise
- No. of episodes: 19

Release
- Original network: Fox
- Original release: May 29 – September 18, 2024

Season chronology
- ← Previous; Season 13 Next → Season 15

The fourteenth season of the American competitive reality television series MasterChef (also known as MasterChef: Generations) premiered on Fox on May 29, 2024. Gordon Ramsay, Aarón Sánchez, and Joe Bastianich all returned as judges.

The season was won by business owner Michael Leonard, with customer experience manager Becca Gibb and lawyer Kamay Lafalaise as the runners-up.

== Production ==
The series was confirmed for a fourteenth season renewal on August 9, 2023. On March 4, 2024, it was announced that the fourteenth season would premiere on May 29, 2024, with judges Bastianich, Ramsay, and Sánchez announced to be returning as well. This season's theme featured contestants representing four various generations of cooking talent − Baby Boomers, Generation X, Millennials and Generation Z.

== Contestants ==
Note: Contestant details are as shown in graphics in the show except where cited.

Contestant	Age	Hometown	Occupation	Generation	Status
Michael Leonard	27	Myrtle Beach, South Carolina	Business owner	Millennials	Winner September 18
Becca Gibb	24	Provo, Utah	Customer experience manager	Gen Z	Runners-up September 18
Kamay Lafalaise	34	Washington, D.C.	Attorney	Millennials	Runners-up September 18
Rebecka Evans	63	Castle Rock, Colorado	Retired opera singer	Baby Boomers	Eliminated September 11
Christopher "Murt" Murton	27	Fort Lauderdale, Florida	Commercial real estate broker	Gen Z	Eliminated September 11
Adam Hart	23	Sedalia, Colorado	Dude ranch worker	Gen Z	Eliminated September 11
Horacio Tucunduva	62	Nashville, Tennessee	Retired auto industry executive	Baby Boomers	Eliminated September 4
Warren Coleman	70	Neptune, New Jersey	Retired flight attendant	Baby Boomers	Eliminated September 4
Hallie Clark	24	Berry, Alabama	Professional cornhole player	Gen Z	Eliminated September 4
Kimberly Karver	52	Auburn, California	High school teacher	Gen X	Eliminated September 4
Daniela Peregrina	52	Tehachapi, California	Reiki master	Gen X	Eliminated August 28
Jeet Kaur Sawant	32	Portland, Oregon	Senior HR specialist	Millennials	Eliminated August 28
Arthur Chan	49	Malibu, California	Agency managing partner	Gen X	Eliminated August 21
Fatima Ayotunde	26	Queens, New York	Doctor	Gen Z	Eliminated August 21
Christopher Walinski	59	Hope, New Jersey	Dentist	Baby Boomers	Eliminated August 14
Anna Johnson	37	Dallas, Texas	Tax director	Millennials	Eliminated August 14
Christopher "Geags" Geagon	60	Bradenton, Florida	Personal trainer	Baby Boomers	Eliminated August 14
Christopher "Chris" Musgrove	45	Mobile, Alabama	Real estate investor/contractor	Gen X	Eliminated July 17
Sunshine Carlos	50	Portland, Oregon	Yoga instructor	Gen X	Eliminated July 10
Si Envytnc Nguyen	30	San Francisco, California	Biotech manager	Millennials	Eliminated June 26

== Elimination table ==
Place	Contestant	Episodes														
Place	Contestant	5	6	7	8	9	10	11	12	13	14	15	16	17		18/19
1	Michael	IN	IMM	WIN	IN	WIN	IMM	IN	WIN	IMM	HIGH	LOW	WIN	WIN	LOW	WINNER
2	Becca	IN	HIGH	LOW	WIN	IMM	IN	WIN	LOW	IN	IN	WIN	IN	LOW	HIGH	RUNNERS-UP
2	Kamay	HIGH	IMM	WIN	HIGH	IMM	HIGH	IN	LOW	WIN	IMM	HIGH	IN	WIN	WIN	RUNNERS-UP
4	Rebecka	WIN	IMM	WIN	IN	IN	WIN	IMM	LOW	LOW	IN	HIGH	WIN	WIN	ELIM	
5	Murt	LOW	IN	IN	IMM	LOW	HIGH	WIN	LOW	HIGH	HIGH	WIN	WIN	ELIM		
6	Adam	HIGH	IN	LOW	IMM	IN	IMM	WIN	LOW	LOW	WIN	LOW	ELIM			
7	Horacio	IMM	IN	WIN	IN	HIGH	IMM	WIN	IN	IN	IN	ELIM				
7	Warren	IMM	HIGH	WIN	IN	IN	IMM	WIN	IN	HIGH	LOW	ELIM				
9	Hallie	IN	IN	IN	IMM	HIGH	IN	WIN	IN	IN	ELIM					
9	Kimberly	IN	HIGH	IN	HIGH	IN	IN	IN	WIN	IMM	ELIM					
11	Daniela	LOW	IN	IN	IN	HIGH	LOW	LOW	IN	ELIM						
12	Jeet	IN	IMM	WIN	IN	IMM	LOW	LOW	ELIM							
13	Arthur	IN	IN	IN	LOW	LOW	HIGH	ELIM								
14	Fatima	IN	LOW	IN	IMM	IN	ELIM									
15	Christopher	IMM	LOW	WIN	HIGH	ELIM										
16	Anna	IN	WIN	IMM	ELIM											
16	Geags	IMM	IN	WIN	ELIM											
18	Chris	IN	IN	ELIM												
19	Sunshine	HIGH	ELIM													
20	Si	ELIM														

(WINNER) This cook won the competition.
(RUNNER-UP) This cook finished as a runner-up in the finals.
(WIN) The cook won the individual challenge (Mystery Box Challenge/Skills Test or Elimination Test).
(WIN) The cook was on the winning team in the Team Challenge and directly advanced to the next round.
(HIGH) The cook was one of the top entries in the individual challenge but didn't win.
(HIGH) The cook was one of the top entries in the Team Challenge.
(IN) The cook wasn't selected as a top or bottom entry in an individual challenge.
(IN) The cook wasn't selected as a top or bottom entry in a team challenge.
(IMM) The cook didn't have to compete in that round of the competition and was safe from elimination.
(IMM) The cook had to compete in that round of the competition but was safe from elimination.
(IMM) The cook was selected by the winner of the previous challenge and didn't have to compete in the Elimination Test.
(LOW) The cook was one of the bottom entries in an individual challenge, and was the last person to advance.
(LOW) The cook was one of the bottom entries in the Team Challenge and they advanced.
(ELIM) The cook was eliminated from MasterChef.

== Episodes ==
No. overall	No. in season	Title	Original release date	Prod. code	U.S. viewers (millions)
264	1	"Millennials Auditions"	May 29, 2024	MCH-1401	1.81
Food journalist Priya Krishna is this week's guest judge for the season premiere. The contestants must get at least three yes votes to advance. They will audition by generation and first up is Millennials. The first contestant to audition is Jeet; she gets three yeses earning her this season's first white apron. Lexi auditions next and she does not earn a white apron. Kamay auditions next and she gets three yeses earning her an apron. Tori fails her audition. Next up is Si who earns three yeses. Anna auditions next and becomes the first contestant to advance with four yes votes. The final audition of the day is Michael. He gets four yes votes earning him the last millennial apron.
265	2	"Baby Boomers Auditions"	June 5, 2024	MCH-1402	1.91
Joe's mother Lidia Bastianich joins the judging panel for the second round of auditions, which features Baby Boomers. Rebecka earns four yeses and the first white apron of the evening. Derak is next, and he fails his audition. Warren, Horacio and Geags each receive three yeses. Alan is next; he does not receive an apron. The last to audition of the day is Christopher. He ends up being the final Boomer given an apron.
266	3	"Gen Z Auditions"	June 12, 2024	MCH-1403	1.75
Internet personality and MasterChef Season 10 finalist Nick DiGiovanni returns to judge the Gen Z contestants. Becca auditions first and receives four yeses and an apron. Violet auditions next but does not get an apron. Fatima also earns four yeses, while Matt fails his audition. Adam gets three out of four yeses and the next apron. Sophie auditions next; she only gets one yes so she does not advance. Hallie and Murt each earn three yeses and the last two Gen Z aprons.
267	4	"Gen X Auditions"	June 19, 2024	MCH-1404	1.83
Season 3 winner Christine Hà returns to judge the final round of auditions, featuring Gen X. The first audition of the night is Scott. He only gets two yeses which does not earn him a white apron. Kimberly is next and she gets three yeses which earns her a white apron. Arthur auditions next and receives four yeses giving him a white apron. Soren auditions next and fails after accidentally dropping her dish, however Sunshine earns three out of four yes votes giving her a white apron. Marie fails her audition. Chris is next and he receives a white apron getting three out of four yeses. The final audition is Daniela. She gets four out of four yeses earning her the last spot in the competition. Additionally, she gets engaged at the end of the episode.
268	5	"Back to the Future - Mystery Box"	June 26, 2024	MCH-1405	1.97
Mystery Box Challenge: The contestants open their mystery box to find childhood photos of themselves. Their challenge is to take a comfort food from their childhood and recreate it in an elevated style. The winner earns immunity for themself next week and immunity for their entire generation tonight, while the worst contestant will be eliminated. They have 60 minutes to prepare their dish. The top dishes belong to Kamay, Adam, Sunshine and Rebecka, and Rebecka wins the challenge, earning immunity for all of the Baby Boomers. The worst dishes belong to Murt, Si and Daniela, and Si is eliminated.; Challenge winner/Immune: Rebecka Evans; Immune: Christopher Walinski, Christopher "Geags" Geagon, Horacio Tucunduva and Warren Coleman; Bottom three: Daniela Peregrina, Christopher "Murt" Murton and Si Envytnc Nguyen; Eliminated: Si Envytnc Nguyen
269	6	"Age Is Just a Number"	July 10, 2024	MCH-1406	1.84
Elimination Challenge: Rebecka is immune and does not have to compete due to winning last week's competition. The contestants are given one hour to make a dish featuring at least two fermented foods in the pantry. Halfway through the challenge, the judges reveal a third, mystery ingredient, Stilton cheese, and Rebecka gets to decide which generation must incorporate it into their dishes; she chooses Gen X. The top four are Anna, Becca, Kimberly and Warren, and Anna wins the challenge, winning immunity for the Millennials and the immunity pin for herself next week. The bottom three are Fatima, Sunshine and Christopher, and Sunshine is eliminated.; Immune: Rebecka Evans; Challenge winner/Immune: Anna Johnson; Immune: Jeet Kaur Sawant, Kamay Lafalaise and Michael Leonard; Bottom three: Christopher Walinski, Fatima Ayotunde and Sunshine Carlos; Eliminated: Sunshine Carlos
270	7	"LAFC Field Challenge"	July 17, 2024	MCH-1407	1.83
Team Challenge: For their next challenge, the contestants travel to BMO Stadium. Anna is immune this week, and she is allowed to decide which generations will work together; she pairs the Millennials with the Baby Boomers, forming the Red Team with Anna as captain, leaving Gen X and Gen Z as the Blue Team, with Becca as captain. The teams are asked to prepare 101 portions of a healthy dinner, consisting of a protein, vegetable side, starch and sauce, for the players, coaches and VIPs of Los Angeles FC, and must present a sample plate in 30 minutes. The Red Team is declared the winner, and Anna receives an advantage in the following challenge. Becca, Chris and Adam are singled out for being the three weakest performers, and Chris is eliminated.; Immune: Anna Johnson; Challenge winners: Anna Johnson, Christopher Walinski, Christopher "Geags" Geagon, Horacio Tucunduva, Jeet Kaur Sawant, Kamay Lafalaise, Michael Leonard, Rebecka Evans and Warren Coleman; Bottom three: Adam Hart, Becca Gibb and Christopher "Chris" Musgrove; Eliminated: Christopher "Chris" Musgrove
271	8	"Birthday Bakes"	August 14, 2024	MCH-1408	1.49
Elimination Challenge: The contestants have 90 minutes to bake a birthday cake featuring at least two layers. Anna is required to compete in the challenge, but she is allowed to decide which generation must bake their cakes without a stand mixer; she picks Gen Z. Becca, Kamay, Kimberly and Christopher are selected as the top four, and Becca wins, winning the immunity pin for herself and immunity for Gen Z. Anna, Arthur and Geags are the bottom three, and Anna and Geags are both eliminated.; Challenge winner/Immune: Becca Gibb; Immune: Adam Hart, Fatima Ayotunde, Hallie Clark and Christopher "Murt" Murton; Bottom three: Anna Johnson, Arthur Chan and Christopher "Geags" Geagon; Eliminated: Anna Johnson and Christopher "Geags" Geagon
272	9	"Memory Lane - Mystery Box"	August 14, 2024	MCH-1409	1.49
Mystery Box Challenge: The contestants are presented with four mystery boxes containing ingredients representing the four generations. In addition to being safe from elimination, Becca is allowed to assign the boxes to each generation. She gives the Millennial box to Gen Z, the Baby Boomer box to the Millennials, and allows Gen X to keep their box, leaving the Gen Z box with the Baby Boomers by default. They are then given 45 minutes to cook a dish using at least four ingredients inside their assigned box. Horacio, Hallie, Daniela and Michael are named the top four, and Michael wins, earning the pin and immunity for the Millennials. Arthur, Christopher and Murt are called out as the bottom three, and Christopher is eliminated.; Immune: Becca Gibb; Challenge winner/Immune: Michael Leonard; Immune: Jeet Kaur Sawant and Kamay Lafalaise; Bottom three: Arthur Chan, Christopher Walinski and Christopher "Murt" Murton; Eliminated: Christopher Walinski
273	10	"Beer Necessities"	August 21, 2024	MCH-1410	1.28
Elimination Challenge: The contestants are joined by Season 13 winner Grant Gillon. They have 45 minutes to make a dish infused with Blue Moon beer. As well as being immune from elimination, Michael is allowed to save one member of a generation other than the Millennials 30 minutes into the challenge, and he selects Adam. Murt, Arthur, Rebecka and Kamay are chosen as the top four, and Rebecka wins, winning the pin and immunity for the Baby Boomers. Daniela, Fatima and Jeet are named the bottom three, and Fatima is eliminated.; Immune: Adam Hart and Michael Leonard; Challenge winner/Immune: Rebecka Evans; Immune: Horacio Tucunduva and Warren Coleman; Bottom three: Daniela Peregrina, Fatima Ayotunde and Jeet Kaur Sawant; Eliminated: Fatima Ayotunde
274	11	"Quarry Field Challenge"	August 21, 2024	MCH-1411	1.28
Team Challenge: The contestants travel to a rock quarry for their next challenge. The judges pair Gen Z with the Baby Boomers, forming the Blue Team with Rebecka as captain, leaving Gen X and the Millennials as the Red Team with Arthur as captain. The teams are tasked with preparing a hearty lunch, consisting of a protein, side and sauce, for 101 quarry workers, and are required to present a sample plate in 30 minutes. Rebecka is given the ability to select the proteins; she chooses the chicken sandwich for the Blue Team and gives the burger to the Red Team. The Blue Team is named the winner, and Rebecka receives an advantage in the following challenge. Arthur, Daniela and Jeet are deemed the bottom three, and Arthur is eliminated.; Immune: Rebecka Evans; Challenge winners: Adam Hart, Becca Gibb, Hallie Clark, Horacio Tucunduva, Christopher "Murt" Murton, Rebecka Evans and Warren Coleman; Bottom three: Arthur Chan, Daniela Peregrina and Jeet Kaur Sawant; Eliminated: Arthur Chan
275	12	"Tag Team"	August 28, 2024	MCH-1412	1.45
Team Challenge: The judges announce that the contestants will no longer be competing in generations. They face the annual tag team challenge, and Rebecka gets to form the teams. She pairs Warren and Hallie (Orange Team); Daniela and Horacio (Green Team); Murt and Kamay (Maroon Team); Jeet and Adam (Red Team), and Michael and Kimberly (Blue Team), leaving Becca and herself to form the Grey Team. They are given 75 minutes to make a four-course meal featuring dishes representative of each generation while taking turns cooking and giving directions. The Blue Team wins, winning two pins and an advantage in the upcoming challenge. The Grey, Maroon, and Red Teams are singled out as the bottom three teams, and Jeet is eliminated.; Challenge winners/Immune: Michael Leonard and Kimberly Karver; Bottom six: Adam Hart, Becca Gibb, Jeet Kaur Sawant, Kamay Lafalaise, Christopher “Murt” Murton, and Rebecka Evans; Eliminated: Jeet Kaur Sawant
276	13	"Storm's a Brewin'"	August 28, 2024	MCH-1413	1.45
Elimination Challenge: The contestants are tasked with cooking a dish highlighting coffee in at least two different ways in 45 minutes, after receiving a demonstration from Gordon. Michael and Kimberly, who are safe from elimination, get to force three contestants to prepare a dessert; they choose Adam, Rebecka and Becca. The top three dishes belong to Kamay, Murt and Warren, and Kamay earns the final immunity pin of the season. Adam, Daniela and Rebecka present the bottom three dishes, and Daniela is eliminated.; Immune: Michael Leonard and Kimberly Karver; Challenge winner/Immune: Kamay Lafalaise; Bottom three: Adam Hart, Daniela Peregrina and Rebecka Evans; Eliminated: Daniela Peregrina
277	14	"Feel the Burn - Mystery Box"	September 4, 2024	MCH-1414	1.72
Mystery Box Challenge: Internet host Sean Evans joins the contestants for a fiery mystery box challenge. They have 45 minutes to make a dish using at least three of the spicy ingredients under the box. It is also announced that two cooks will be going home after this challenge. In addition to being safe from elimination, Kamay is allowed to ice out one contestant for five minutes; she picks Becca. Murt, Michael and Adam are selected as the top three, and Adam wins, winning the last advantage of the season. Hallie, Kimberly and Warren are singled out as the bottom three, and Hallie and Kimberly are both eliminated.; Immune: Kamay Lafalaise; Challenge winner/Immune: Adam Hart; Bottom three: Hallie Clark, Kimberly Karver and Warren Coleman; Eliminated: Hallie Clark and Kimberly Karver
278	15	"The Wall"	September 4, 2024	MCH-1415	1.72
Team Challenge: The contestants are split into teams of two and must create dishes that look and taste identical while communicating on opposite sides of a wall. It also announced that two cooks will be eliminated after this challenge and that the two cooks that leave don't have to be from the same team. They are allowed to pick the teams, but Adam gets to choose his teammate first, and he selects Michael, forming the Green Team. Becca and Murt, Kamay and Rebecka, and Horacio and Warren form the Blue, Red and Grey Teams respectively. The teams are given five minutes to pick their ingredients in the pantry, and 60 minutes to cook their dishes. The Blue Team wins the challenge, while the Red Team is judged to have done well enough to stay. The Green and Grey Teams are named the bottom four. The Grey Team is eliminated.; Challenge winners: Becca Gibb and Christopher "Murt" Murton; Bottom four: Adam Hart, Horacio Tucunduva, Michael Leonard and Warren Coleman; Eliminated: Horacio Tucunduva and Warren Coleman
279	16	"Ramsay's Rooftop Restaurant Takeover"	September 11, 2024	MCH-1416	1.80
Team Challenge: The contestants takeover the kitchen of Ramsay's Rooftop, a pop-up restaurant in Downtown Los Angeles. Murt leads the Red Team with Michael and Rebecka, while Becca leads the Blue Team with Adam and Kamay. The teams must prepare and serve two appetizers and two entrees from the menu. The Red Team wins, leaving the Blue Team as the bottom three by default, and Adam is eliminated.; Challenge winners: Michael Leonard, Christopher "Murt" Murton and Rebecka Evans; Bottom three: Adam Hart, Becca Gibb and Kamay Lafalaise; Eliminated: Adam Hart
280	17	"Semi Final"	September 11, 2024	MCH-1417	1.80
Mystery Box Challenge: The semifinalists are given 45 minutes to make a dish inspired by the restaurant review in the box. Kamay, Rebecka and Michael present the best dishes. Becca and Murt are the bottom two, and Murt is eliminated.; Challenge winners: Kamay Lafalaise, Michael Leonard and Rebecka Evans; Eliminated: Christopher "Murt" Murton; Pressure Test: The four remaining semifinalists must keep up with Gordon in replicating his pan-seared salmon with truffle gnocchi and sautéed asparagus. They have 30 seconds to finish plating when he completes his dish. Kamay wins the challenge, while Michael and Rebecka are singled out as the bottom two, and Rebecka is eliminated.; Challenge winner: Kamay Lafalaise; Eliminated: Rebecka Evans
281	18	"Finale (Part One)"	September 18, 2024	MCH-1418	1.68
Finale: The finalists must prepare and execute a three-course meal consisting of an appetizer, entree and dessert, with one hour to make each course. The judges announce that the winner will receive a brand-new kitchen from Viking and kitchenware from OXO.; Appetizer: Becca serves crispy-skin salmon with braised leeks, tomato water, basil oil and crispy basil leaves. Kamay serves habanero squash soup with poached lobster tail, pickled rainbow chard and caviar. Michael serves truffle tortellini with mint and pea purée, preserved lemon vinaigrette, asparagus and wild mushrooms.; The entrées begin cooking as the first hour ends.
282	19	"Finale (Part Two)"	September 18, 2024	MCH-1419	1.68
Entrée: Kamay serves pan-seared striped bass with passion fruit sauce, soy glazed squash, sweet potato croquettes and an avocado mousse. Michael serves herb-crusted rack of venison with butternut squash, caramelized onions and duck fat purée, Swiss chard and a blackberry wine sauce. Becca serves herb-crusted lamb with a brown butter spaetzle, bitter greens and fig balsamic reduction.; Dessert: Becca serves berry tart with berry gel, berry mousse, pât sucrée, mascarpone whip and candied lemon. Michael serves deconstructed peach cobbler: white chocolate pound cake with passion fruit zabaglione, buttermilk ice cream, streusel crumble, brown sugar-grilled peaches and a passion fruit syrup. Kamay serves guava rum strawberry shortcake with tarragon crème diplomat.; Final three: Becca Gibb, Kamay Lafalaise and Michael Leonard; Michael is named the winner, winning the trophy, prizes and MasterChef title.; MasterChef Winner: Michael Leonard
