= MasterChef Thailand season 1 =

MasterChef Thailand
- Season 1
- No. of episodes: 17

Release
- Original network: Channel 7
- Original release: June 4 – September 24, 2017

Season chronology
- Next → Season 2

MasterChef Thailand (season 1) is a Thai competitive reality TV series that premiered on Channel 7 on June 4, 2017. The show welcomes the presenters which includes the host Piyathida Mittiraroch, alongside the judges Pasan Svastivatana, Kwantip Devakula, and Pongtawat Chalermkittichai. More than 1,000 people across the country applied for the show this year, and 100 made it to the audition round. After the auditions, 38 contestants received the apron, but only 16 made it to the MasterChef as the real contestants of this season.

This debut season is won by Paweenuch "Kaew" Yodpreechawijit against Alisa "Lisa" Dawson, who finished in second place.

== Contestants ==
Top 16

Contestant	Age	Hometown	Occupation	Status	Number of Wins
Paweenuch Yodpreechawijit (Kaew)	24	Pathum Thani	Unemployed	Winner on September 24	4
Alisa Dawson (Lisa)	29	Bangkok	English teacher	Runner-up on September 24; Returned on August 27; Eliminated on August 20	7
Nutnicha Bunlert (Ploy)	26	Pathum Thani	Air hostess	Eliminated on September 24	5
Jumlong Sriraksa	31	Rayong	Fishing pond owner	Eliminated on September 24	4
Suthakorn Suwanchote (Pao)	29	Bangkok	Food stylist	Eliminated on September 17	5
Tanakorn Suwankot (Ying Aod)	20	Mukdahan	Student	Eliminated on September 17	3
Suwijak Pruektayanon (Mark)	19	Chiang Mai	Student	Eliminated on September 10	1
Ksynn Detcharoen (Aof)	34	Bangkok	Steward	Eliminated on September 3	4
Luksanawadee Sripornsawat (Nam Fon)	27	Yala	Trader	Eliminated on August 13	3
Nikul Phayungpong (Nick)	29	Bangkok	Racer	Eliminated on August 13	2
Butchaka Rojjanai (Bua)	25	Bangkok	Unemployed	Eliminated on August 6	2
Marisa Virojworakul (Mink)	18	Phang Nga	Student	Eliminated on July 30	0
Rujikorn Mungmee (Kaw Oat)	26	Bangkok	Executive trade marketing man	Eliminated on July 23	1
Apipong Detsupha (Oak)	34	Bangkok	Magician	Eliminated on July 23	0
Pongsakorn Jirasathit (Bank)	26	Chiang Mai	DJ	Eliminated on July 9	0
Sureeporn Na Takuatung (Chompu)	56	Bangkok	Self-employed (Note: Thailand's Got Talent Season 4 contestant)	Eliminated on July 2	0

Notes:

Future appearances:

- Kaew appeared as one of the special guests in Episode 14 of Season 2, presenting a Pressure Test challenge from her cookbook.
- Almost every contestants in this season were among the guest judges for the Team Challenge in Episode 5 of Junior Season 1.
- In 2020, MasterChef All-Stars premiered featuring past contestants. Lisa, Ploy, Jumlong and Nick competed in this season.
- Kaew was one of the guest judge in Episode 1 of All-Stars. She later appeared as a special guest in Episode 12.
- Kaew, Lisa and Ploy appeared to be one of the chef helpers in Celebrity Season 1. Kaew and Ploy later returned as chef helpers in Celebrity Season 3.
- Lisa appeared to be one of the guest judge in the Team Challenge of Episode 10 of Season 4.
- Ploy appeared as a special guest in Episode 10 of Season 6.
- In 2025, Kaew and Ploy returned to compete in The Professionals season. Ploy made into the grand finale despite not winning the title.

== Elimination table ==
Place	Contestant	Episode																		
Place	Contestant	5		6	7		8	9		10	11		12/13		14		15	16		17
1	Kaew	LOW	IN	NPT	IN	IN	PT	HIGH	WIN	PT	HIGH	IN	WIN	IMM	HIGH	IN	PT	LOW	WIN	WINNER
2	Lisa	IN	IN	WIN	IN	IN	WIN	WIN	IMM	PT	IN	WIN	ELIM	RET	WIN	WIN	WIN	IN	IN	RUNNER-UP
3	Ploy	WIN	HIGH	WIN	HIGH	IN	WIN	HIGH	IN	LOW	IN	LOW	WIN	IMM	IN	IN	WIN	LOW	LOW	FINALIST
3	Jumlong	LOW	IN	LOW	IN	HIGH	LOW	IN	IN	WIN	IN	IN	WIN	IMM	IN	WIN	PT	WIN	IN	FINALIST
5	Pao	HIGH	IN	WIN	IN	LOW	WIN	IN	HIGH	WIN	WIN	IMM	PT	IMM	IN	LOW	WIN	IN	ELIM	
6	Ying Aod	IN	IN	WIN	IN	IN	WIN	IN	IN	WIN	IN	IN	PT	IMM	IN	IN	WIN	ELIM		
7	Mark	IN	IN	PT	HIGH	LOW	PT	IN	IN	WIN	HIGH	IN	PT	IMM	HIGH	IN	ELIM			
8	Aof	IN	IN	PT	IN	WIN	WIN	IN	IN	WIN	IN	HIGH	WIN	IMM	IN	ELIM				
9	Namfon	IN	IN	WIN	WIN	IN	WIN	IN	IN	LOW	IN	ELIM		OUT						
9	Nick	IN	WIN	LOW	IN	IMM	LOW	IN	LOW	WIN	IN	ELIM		OUT						
11	Bua	IN	IN	WIN	IN	IN	WIN	IN	LOW	ELIM				OUT						
12	Mink	IN	IN	PT	IN	IN	PT	IN	ELIM					OUT						
13	Kaw Oat	IN	LOW	WIN	IN	IN	ELIM							OUT						
13	Oak	HIGH	IN	PT	IN	LOW	ELIM													
15	Bank	IN	LOW	ELIM										OUT						
16	Chompu	IN	ELIM											OUT						

(WINNER) This cook won the competition.
(RUNNER-UP) This cook finished in second place.
(ELIM) This cook was eliminated at the Finals.
(WIN) The cook won an individual challenge (Mystery Box Challenge or Invention Test).
(WIN) The cook was on the winning team in the Team Challenge and directly advanced to the next round.
(HIGH) The cook was one of the top entries in an individual challenge, but didn't win.
(IN) The cook wasn't selected as a top or bottom entry in an individual challenge.
(IN) The cook wasn't selected as a top or bottom entry in a team challenge.
(IMM) The cook didn't have to compete in that round of the competition and was safe from elimination.
(PT) The cook was on the losing team in the Team Challenge and competed in the Pressure Test.
(NPT) The cook was on the losing team in the Team Challenge, did not compete in the Pressure Test, and advanced.
(OUT) The cook came back for a chance to win re-entry into the competition but lost in Special Mystery Box Challenge.
(OUT) The cook came back for a chance to win re-entry into the competition, won in Special Mystery Box Challenge but lost in Special Pressure Test.
(RET) The cook won the Reinstation Challenge and returned to the competition.
(LOW) The cook was one of the bottom entries in an individual challenge, but wasn't the last person to advance.
(LOW) The cook was one of the bottom entries in an individual challenge, and the last person to advance.
(LOW) The cook was one of the bottom entries in the Team Challenge and they were the only person from their team to advance
(LOW) The cook was eliminated but saved from elimination.
(ELIM) The cook was eliminated from MasterChef.

== Episodes ==
=== Episode 1 ===
- Original airdate: Sunday 4 June 2017
- Auditions Round 1

=== Episode 2 ===
- Original airdate: Sunday 11 June 2017
- Auditions Round 2

=== Episode 3 ===
- Original airdate: Sunday 18 June 2017
- Auditions Round 3

=== Episode 4 ===
- Original airdate: Sunday 25 June 2017
- Skills Test: For the first part of the episode, the top 38 will have to cut about 5 tons of ginger. The ginger must be finely diced and sliced. Any contestants who aren't able to meet the judges' standard will be eliminated immediately. 14 contestants were eliminated in this test, leaving only 24 contestants to the next round.
- Cooking Test: The remaining 24 contestants were given only one short mackerel each, and were given only 60 minutes to make a dish with short mackerel as the centerpiece. Pong, Perth, Pichit, Earth, Dollaya, Pung, Ae, and Ching were eliminated in this test. The rest were advanced to the next episode.

=== Episode 5 ===
- Original airdate: Sunday 2 July 2017
- Mystery Box Challenge 1: The contestants were given their first Mystery Box. Pao's, Oak's, and Ploy's were the top three dishes. The best dish was Ploy's.
  - Challenge Winner: Ploy
- Invention Test 1: As the winner of the mystery box challenge, Ploy was given a choice to select one of the three rare and expensive ingredients. She chose the great scallops. She is also given 5 minutes of shopping time, while others got only 3 minutes. Ploy's and Nick's dishes were the best dishes in this test. Nick was the winner. The rest except for Bank, Kaw Oat, and Chompu did well enough and move on to the next competition.
  - Winner: Nick
  - Bottom three: Bank, Kaw Oat, Chompu
  - Eliminated: Chompu

=== Episode 6 ===
- Original airdate: Sunday 9 July 2017
- Team Challenge 1: Contestants were separated into two teams. Each team must serve 101 tuk-tuk drivers. The theme of the dish was "East Meets West". The dish must have at least 1 kind of protein, 1 kind of vegetable, and 1 kind of flour on it. The team that reaches 51 votes from the drivers first will win. The red team won the challenge when reaching 51 votes first.

Team captain	Member
Ploy	Lisa, Pao, Nam Fon, Ying Aod, Kaw Oat and Bua
Nick	Kaew, Oak, Mark, Jum Long, Aof, Ming and Bank

  - Team Challenge Winners/Immune: Ploy, Lisa, Pao, Nam Fon, Ying Aod, Kaw Oat, Bua (Red team)
- Pressure Test 1: The blue team lost the team challenge. But the team captain can choose 1 member to get immune. Nick (team captain) choose Kaew. The other member that not got immune were asked to cooked 4 types of egg dishes correctly. They were, boiled egg, scrambled egg, fried egg, and poached egg dishes within 25 minutes. Nick, Jumlong, and Bank were the bottom three. Bank was eliminated.
  - Immune: Kaew
  - Bottom three: Nick, Jumlong, Bank
  - Eliminated: Bank

=== Episode 7 ===
- Original airdate: Sunday 16 July 2017
- Mystery Box Challenge 2: The contestants were given their second Mystery Box. The main ingredient was a lobster. The best dishes were Ploy's, Mark's, and Nam Fon's. The best dish was Nam Fon's.
  - Challenge Winner: Nam Fon
- After the challenge, Nick suffered from shrimp allergy, making him unable to compete in the next round. The judges gave him an immunity in the next round due to his allergy.
  - Immune: Nick
- Invention Test 2: As the winner from the last challenge, Nam Fon was given a choice to select one of three ingredients for herself, and the rest of the contestants. The theme of the dish was "Modern Thai Traditional Food." She chose cat fish spawns for herself, and shrimps for the rest of the contestants. Same as the last invention test, Nam Fon was given 5 minutes of shopping time, while others got only 3 minutes. The two best dishes were Jumlong's, and Aof's. Aof's dish was the best in this round. The bottom three dishes were Oak's, Pao's, Mark's. The judges decided that Mark's dishes were the worst out of the three.
  - Winner: Aof
  - Bottom three: Oak, Pao, Mark
- Due to Nick's sickness, the judges decided that nobody will be eliminated this week. Mark, who was going to be eliminated, was safe.
  - Eliminated: None

=== Episode 8 ===
- Original airdate: Sunday 23 July 2017
- Team Challenge 2: Contestants were separated into two teams. Each team must serve 129 ancient car collectors. The theme of the dish was "Ancient Thai cuisine". The dish must have at least 1 kind of Thai entrée, and 1 kind of Thai dessert. The team that reaches 65 votes from the car collectors first will win. During the challenge, the blue team, leads by Aof, cannot serves the food to around 30 car collectors because the time had run out. In the meantime, the red team, leads by Jumlong, serves their food to every single one and serves more food to the collectors who want to eat more. However, the blue team won the challenge because of the taste of their food.

Team captain	Member
Jum Long	Nick, Kaew, Mark, Oak, Mink and Kaw Oat
Aof	Ying Aod, Lisa, Nam Fon, Ploy, Aof, Pao and Bua

  - Team Challenge Winners/Immune: Ploy, Nam Fon, Pao, Aof, Lisa, Ying Yod, Bua (Blue team)
- Pressure Test 2: In this test, there was no contestants in the red team who was saved in this round because the judge needed to eliminate 2 contestants in this week. The topic of this test was to cook ancient Pad thai correctly, that is noodle and prawns must not be overcooked, sauce must smell less of tamarind, and the sauce must use only tamarind, coconut sugar, and fish sauce. During the contest, Nick, who is allergic to prawns, have a hard time to cook this menu, according to his interview, which is caused him to be the bottom four, along with Oak, Kao Oat, and Jumlong. Luckily, Nick and Jumlong were saved from this elimination and caused another 2 contestants to be eliminated from the contest.
  - Bottom Four: Nick, Oak, Kao Oat, Jumlong
  - Eliminated: Oak, Kao Oat

=== Episode 9 ===
- Original airdate: Sunday 30 July 2017
- Mystery Box Challenge 3: In this mystery box, the contestants have to cook the food which the main ingredient is pig head. Ploy, Kaew and Lisa is the top 3 dishes in this competition. Lisa is the winner in this competition.
  - Challenge Winner/Immune: Lisa
- Invention Test 3: Since Lisa won the mystery box challenge, Lisa got immune for invention test. And she can control the invention test by she can choose one main ingredient to one contestant and another to other contestants. Which the contestants have to cook Desserts. The main ingredients are honeycomb, berry fruit groups and chili. Lisa choose chili to Nick and choose berry to other contestants. All contestants and 90 minutes to cook the dessert and 3 minutes in supermarket.
  - Winner: Kaew
  - Bottom Three: Bua, Mink and Nick
  - Eliminated: Mink

=== Episode 10 ===
- Original airdate: Sunday 6 August 2017
- Team Challenge 3: In this week, the top 2 dishes, which are Pao and Kaew will be the team captain. After team captain choose the member, the judges command the Pao and Kaew to swap the apron. So the member of each team will be this table.

Team Captain	Members
Pao	Mark, Aof, Ying Aod, Jum Long and Nick
Kaew	Lisa, Ploy, Namfon and Bua

Both teams have to cook the lunch which they have to cook meat dish and dessert 1 dish each to 101 elementary student which ages about 6–9 years old. And this competition, will have the nutritionists to check the food quality. Each team have 90 minutes to cook and 60 minutes to serve which your own. After this competition, Red team scored 64, but blue team scored only 37. So the red team won.

  - Team Challenge Winners/Immune: Pao, Mark, Aof, Ying Aod, Jumlong, Nick (Red Team)
- Pressure Test 3: The red team have to cook pasta menu which you have to cook pasta noodle and sauce with your own within 90 minutes.
  - Bottom three: Bua, Nam Fon, Ploy
  - Eliminated: Bua

=== Episode 11 ===
- Original airdate: Sunday 13 August 2017
- Mystery Box Challenge 4: In this mystery box, the contestants have to cook the food which the main ingredient is Mutsuzaka Wagyu A5. And the other ingredients are egg, bread, Cheddar cheese, cabbage, strawberry jam, banana, carrot, Scallion, dry Bird's eye chili and Cherry tomato. They have 60 minutes to cook the dish. Kaew, Pao and Mark are top three of this competition. Pao is the winner of this round.
  - Challenge Winner/Immune: Pao
- Invention Test 4: Since Pao got privilege to control the invention test. Pao got immune and can choose main ingredient to other contestants. Which the main ingredients are in group of "entrails" which are chicken gizzard, cow rumen and Foie gras. Pao choose chicken gizzard to Nam Fon, Aof and Ying Aod. Choose cow rumen to Nick, Kaew and mark. Choose Foie gras to Ploy, Lisa and Jum Long that he want to prank him.

Unfortunately, this competition have 2 contestants eliminated.

  - Winner: Lisa
  - Bottom Three: Nam Fon, Ploy, Nick
  - Eliminated: Nam Fon, Nick

=== Episode 12/13 ===
- Original airdate: Sunday 20 August 2017
- Team Challenge 4: In this team challenge, the contestants did not go to an outdoor place. They have to compete in the MasterChef kitchen. The top two contestants will be the team captain, which are Lisa and Aof.

Team Captain	Members
Lisa	Pao, Ying Aod and Mark
Aof	Ploy, Kaew and Jum Long

Each have must cook in fine dining that have meat dish and dessert 1 dish each to 25 guest judges. Which main ingredients for meat dish is pork loin. Each team have 60 minutes to cook and serve meat dish and another 60 minutes to cook and serve dessert. The blue team got scores of 14 scores while red team got only 11 scores. This make blue team win.

  - Team Challenge Winners/Immune: Aof, Ploy, Kaew, Jum Long (Blue team)
- Pressure Test 4: For the lost team, Each member have to cook four-layered German chocolate cake receipt by Piyatida Mitrteeraroj. Each member will got receipt and ingredient to cook this cake within 120 minutes (2 hours).The contestants that come with the most problems is Lisa because she forgot to put milk in the process of cooking. This made the cake of Lisa Not so soft and sticky.
  - Eliminated: Lisa

- Original airdate: Sunday 27 August 2017
- Special Mystery Box Challenge: The top seven contestants were surprised that they didn't have to cook for this round. Instead, the eliminated contestants (Chompu, Bank, Kaw Oat, Mink, Bua, Nam Fon, Nick, and Lisa) from the previous episodes were given a special mystery box challenge. The top 3 dishes for this challenge will move on to the pressure test. Nam Fon, Lisa, and Nick were the top 3, and advanced to the special pressure test.
- Special Pressure Test: The top 3 contestants from previous challenge were tasked to make a cinnamon pie. The non-eliminated contestants and the judges judged the dishes with each person having a point to give. (The contestants judge the dishes by blind-tasting) The best scored dish of this test will be reinstated of the competition. The best scored dish was Lisa's with 10 out of 10 points.
  - Reinstated: Lisa

=== Episode 14 ===
- Original airdate: Sunday 3 September 2017
- Mystery Box Challenge 5: In this mystery box, the contestants have to cook the food which the main ingredient is fresh chicken. And the other ingredients like melon, Lotus root and wasabi. They have 60 minutes to cook the dish. Mark, Kaew and Lisa are top three of this competition. Lisa is the winner of this round.
  - Challenge Winner: Lisa
- Team Challenge 5: The remaining contestants were paired up into 4 pairs by Lisa. She paired herself with Jumlong, Kaew with Ploy, Pao with Aof, and Ying Aod with Mark. The pairs were given a task to recreate Chef Boontham Pakpo's sushi set in 90 minutes but must switch themselves out every 15 minutes as it is a tag-team challenge. The dish that is the worst out of the four will be the bottom two of this challenge with one person being eliminated. Boontham Pakpo was the special judge for this round.
  - Team Challenge Winners: Lisa, Jumlong
  - Bottom two: Pao, Aof
  - Eliminated: Aof

=== Episode 15 ===
- Original airdate: Sunday 10 September 2017
- Team Challenge 6: Contestants were separated into two teams. The member had to run to the captain that the contestants want to group with. The team captain are Jum Long and Lisa. But only Mark ran to Jum Long. The judges command Lisa to choose 1 member send into Jum long team. Lisa choose Kaew.

Team Captain	Members
Jum Long	Mark and kaew
Lisa	Pao, Ploy and Ying Aod

Each team must serve United Kingdom's ambassador and 63 VIP guests. The theme of the dish was "Enhanced Thai Street Food". The dish must have at least 1 kind of Thai entrée, and 1 kind of Thai dessert. The team that reaches 32 votes from United Kingdom's ambassador and VIPs will win. The blue team, led by Lisa, won the challenge.

  - Team Challenge Winners/Immune: Lisa, Ploy, Pao, Ying Aod
- Pressure Test 5: The red team were asked to cooked 3 types of steak, which are rare steak, medium-rare steak, and well-done steak. For the rare steak, everybody did well. but all of them failed to make well-done steaks. The judges then decided to eliminate a contestant from the medium-rare steak, which made Mark eliminated.
  - Eliminated: Mark

=== Episode 16 ===
- Original airdate: Sunday 17 September 2017
- Mystery Box Challenge 6: The remaining contestants were given each a 1000-baht voucher to go and choose their own ingredients for this challenge for 15 minutes. Unbeknownst to them, they had to switch the ingredients between themselves. The switches were Jumlong & Lisa, Pao & Ying Aod, and Kaew & Ploy. They were given 60 minutes to create their dishes with the worst dish being eliminated. Jumlong was the winner of this challenge, with Ying Aod being eliminated because the main ingredients still raw.
  - Challenge Winner: Jum Long
  - Eliminated: Ying Aod
- Invention Test 5: In this invention test, Jum Long had privilege to choose main ingredients for own and others. The main ingredients are in group of Ingredients from the sea which are black grouper, octopus, Oyster, Black crab and Panulirus versicolor. Since Jum Long won the mystery box, Jum Long chose black grouper, chose octopus for Lisa, chose oyster for Pao, chose black crab for Kaew and chose Panulirus versicolor for Ploy. Everyone had a time to cook of 60 minutes.
  - Bottom two: Pao, Ploy
  - Eliminated: Pao

=== Episode 17 ===
- Original airdate: Sunday 24 September 2017
- Semi-Final: The semi-finalists are drawn into 2 pairs, Jumlong & Kaew, and Lisa & Ploy. The pairs battled each other, with each pair drawing one main ingredient between bluefin tuna and rice. Jumlong & Kaew were given bluefin tuna as their main ingredient, and Lisa & Ploy were given rice. They had 60 minutes to create a dish from the main ingredient they had. The winner of each pair moves on to the final round. The winners were Kaew and Lisa.
  - Challenge Winners: Kaew, Lisa
  - Eliminated: Jumlong, Ploy
- Final: In the final cook-off, the top two were asked to cook an entrée and a desert in whatever way they want. They were given 90 minutes to create those dishes.
  - Final Two: Kaew, Lisa
- Winner Revealed: After the judges review the dishes. They decided that Kaew is the winner of the first season of MasterChef Thailand.
  - MasterChef Thailand Winner: Kaew
