= MasterChef Thailand season 2 =

MasterChef Thailand
- Season 2
- No. of episodes: 17

Release
- Original network: Channel 7
- Original release: February 4 – May 27, 2018

Season chronology
- ← Previous; Season 1 Next → Season 3

The second season of MasterChef Thailand is the Thai version of the competitive reality TV series MasterChef which premiered on Channel 7 on February 4, 2018. It has received more than 3,000 applicants, but only 30 were chosen to audition in MasterChef Kitchen. After audition, 20 contestants qualified to be the real contestants of this season. The same presenters from season 1 are welcomed back, which includes the host Piyathida Mittiraroch, and the judges Pasan Svastivatana, Kwantip Devakula, and Pongtawat Chalermkittichai.

This season is won by Thanapat "First" Suyaw against Nalat "Lat" Chiraveerakul, who finished as the runner-up.

== Contestants ==
Top 20

Contestant	Age	Hometown	Occupation	Status	Number of Wins
Thanapat Suyaw (First)	21	Nan	Trader	Winner on May 27	4
Nalat Chiraveerakul (Lat)	30	Lampang	Online trader	Runner-up on May 27	5
Komsan Wongsa (Deaw)	25	Mae Hong Son	Florist	Eliminated on May 20	4
Bank Jetasanond	38	Bangkok	Steward	Eliminated on May 13	3
Namthip Phoosri (Jah)	25	Bangkok	Auto mechanic	Eliminated on May 13	8
Dissakul Prasitruangsuk (Tum)	25	Bangkok	Doctor	Eliminated on May 6	4
Pongsapol Youngmeesuk (Yuri)	23	Bangkok	Student	Eliminated on April 29	6
Isara Donleeken (Kapom)	26	Maha Sarakham	Farmer	Eliminated on April 22	2
Sunya Thadathanawong (Golf)	37	Bangkok	Photographer	Eliminated on April 15	3
Narinrat Samutrattanakul (Miang)	31	Samut Prakan	Tax planner	Eliminated on April 8	2
Mintra Yonarnan (Min)	27	Bangkok	Korean teacher	Eliminated on April 8	2
Maniporn Pornchotthaweerat (Belle)	33	Bangkok	Marketing manager	Eliminated on April 1	2
Annie Potjes	28	Bangkok	Designer	Eliminated on March 25	3
Poonyanate Tanaprapas (Pung)	37	Bangkok	Graphic designer	Eliminated on March 18	2
Naruepon Kornprasert (Jon)	44	Bangkok	Musician	Eliminated on March 11	2
Nitcha Rungrotthanakul (Prae)	21	Bangkok	Student	Eliminated on March 4	1
Pantiwa Nirundaropas (Aim)	26	Nong Khai	Officer	Eliminated on February 25	0
Pawat Kritsaruenon (Tong)	45	Bangkok	Company employee	Eliminated on February 18	0
Chutikan Aupparanukhro (Pimm)	24	Bangkok	Graphic designer	Eliminated on February 11	0
Pitchatarn Lertudomtana (Bo)	30	Bangkok	Software developer	Eliminated on February 11	0

Future appearances:

- Lat appeared as the special guest in Episode 4 of Junior Season 1.
- Almost every contestants here were one of the guest judges in the Team Challenge of Episode 5 of Junior Season 1. First later appeared as the special guest in the Pressure Test round.
- First later appeared as a special guest multiple times throughout MasterChef series. He appeared in Episode 12 of Season 3, Episode 3 of Junior Season 2, Episode 12 of All-Stars, Episode 15 of Season 5, and Episode 5 of Season 7.
- In 2020, MasterChef All-Stars premiered featuring past contestants. Eight contestants in this season competed, including Lat, Deaw, Jah, Bank, Tum, Kapom, Golf and Belle. Jah became one of the runner-ups of that season, while Lat and Bank made it into the semi-finals.
- First, Deaw, Jah and Bank were one of the chef helpers in Celebrity Season 1. First, Jah, and Bank returned as chef helpers in Celebrity Season 3, as well as Golf making his appearance.
- Golf appeared as the special host at the beginning of Episode 3 of Junior Season 3.
- In 2025, First returned to compete in The Professionals season. He made into semi-final round, but unfortunately missed the spot in the grand finale.

== Elimination table ==
Place	Contestant	Episode																								
Place	Contestant	2		3	4		5	6		7	8		9		10	11		12	13		14	15		16		17
1	First	IN	IN	NPT	IN	HIGH	WIN	HIGH	HIGH	LOW	IN	IN	IN	IMM	PT	IN	IN	LOW	HIGH	IN	WIN	IN	IN	IN	WIN	WINNER
2	Lat	IN	HIGH	WIN	IN	WIN	PT	IN	IN	WIN	HIGH	IN	IN	IMM	PT	HIGH	IN	WIN	IN	LOW	PT	HIGH	IN	WIN	IMM	RUNNER-UP
3	Deaw	IN	WIN	NPT	HIGH	IN	WIN	IN	IN	PT	IN	LOW	IN	IMM	LOW	IN	IN	PT	WIN	IMM	WIN	HIGH	IN	IN	ELIM	
4	Bank	IN	IN	PT	HIGH	IN	NPT	HIGH	IN	PT	WIN	IMM	IN	IMM	WIN	HIGH	IN	WIN	IN	LOW	LOW	IN	ELIM	JOIN		
4	Jah	IN	IN	WIN	WIN	IMM	PT	IN	WIN	WIN	HIGH	IN	IN	IMM	WIN	IN	HIGH	PT	IN	WIN	WIN	WIN	ELIM	JOIN		
6	Tum	LOW	IN	LOW	IN	IN	NPT	IN	IN	WIN	IN	IN	IN	IMM	WIN	IN	WIN	WIN	HIGH	HIGH	ELIM			JOIN		
7	Yuri	IN	IMM	WIN	IN	IN	WIN	IN	IN	WIN	IN	IN	LOW	WIN	WIN	WIN	IMM	WIN	IN	ELIM				JOIN		
8	Kapom	IN	IN	PT	IN	IN	NPT	WIN	IMM	LOW	IN	IN	IN	IMM	WIN	IN	LOW	ELIM						JOIN		
9	Golf	IN	IN	WIN	LOW	IN	LOW	IN	LOW	WIN	IN	IN	IN	IMM	WIN	IN	ELIM							JOIN		
10	Miang	WIN	IMM	LOW	IN	IN	WIN	IN	IN	PT	IN	LOW	IN	IMM	ELIM											
10	Min	LOW	LOW	WIN	IN	IN	NPT	IN	IN	PT	IN	WIN	IN	IMM	ELIM											
12	Belle	IN	IMM	NPT	IN	LOW	WIN	IN	IN	WIN	IN	IN	LOW	ELIM												
13	Annie	IN	IN	WIN	IN	IN	WIN	IN	IN	WIN	IN	ELIM														
14	Pung	IN	LOW	WIN	IN	IN	WIN	IN	IN	ELIM																
15	Jon	IN	IMM	WIN	IN	LOW	WIN	IN	ELIM																	
16	Prae	IN	IN	WIN	IN	IN	ELIM																			
17	Aim	IN	IN	PT	LOW	ELIM																				
18	Tong	IN	IMM	ELIM																						
19	Pimm	IN	ELIM																							
20	Bo	ELIM																								

(WINNER) This cook won the competition.
(RUNNER-UP) This cook finished in second place.
(WIN) The cook won an individual challenge (Mystery box challenge or Invention Test).
(WIN) The cook won an individual challenge (Pressure Test) and was announced by the judges.
(WIN) The cook was on the winning team in the Team challenge and directly advanced to the next round.
(HIGH) The cook was one of the top entries in an individual challenge, but didn't win.
(IN) The cook wasn't selected as a top or bottom entry in an individual challenge.
(IN) The cook wasn't selected as a top or bottom entry in a team challenge.
(IMM) The cook didn't have to compete in that round of the competition and was safe from elimination.
(PT) The cook was on the losing team in the Team challenge and competed in the Pressure test.
(NPT) The cook was on the losing team in the Team challenge, did not compete in the Pressure test, and advanced.
(RET) The cook won the Reinstation Challenge and returned to the competition.
(LOW) The cook was one of the bottom entries in an individual challenge, but wasn't the last person to advance.
(LOW) The cook was one of the bottom entries in an individual challenge, and the last person to advance.
(LOW) The cook was one of the bottom entries in the Team challenge and they were the only person from their team to advance.
(LOW) The cook was one of the bottom entries in the Team challenge, and their team was last to advance.
(JOIN) The cook was originally eliminated but invited back in the competition.
(ELIM) The cook was eliminated from MasterChef.

== Episodes ==
=== Episode 1 ===
- Original airdate: Sunday 4 February 2018
- Basic Cooking Skills: The 30 contestants competed must show the basic skills in the kitchen by using a knife to chop the pork. And use that minced pork for the main ingredient to cook the food in 60 minutes. In this round have bottom 5 that had to eliminate. The other 25 continued to next round.
  - Eliminated: Kunjafar, Roam, Tum, Zai, and Pleum
- Cooking Skills: The other 25 contestants have to compete in round 2 in which the main ingredient is Macrobrachium rosenbergii and each person can use only 2 Macrobrachium rosenbergii for cooking in 60 minutes. Bank, Annie, Prae, Tong, First, Bo, Kapom, Pung, Golf, Yuri, Pimm and Min automatically continue to the next round. The other 12 people, the Judges will taste all 12 people's dishes again. After that, Miang, Mo Tum, Deaw, Lat, Aim, Belle, and Jon were able to continue to next round.
  - Eliminated: Mos, Yo, Baowhiw, Namtarn, and June

=== Episode 2 ===
- Original airdate: Sunday 11 February 2018
- Mystery Box Challenge 1: The contestants had to prepare a dish using only the Mystery Box ingredients, that the main ingredient is Pla ra. And the other ingredients are pork belly, dried shrimp, wet tamarind, Raspberry, Japanese cucumber, bell pepper, Thai basil, Shallot, All-purpose flour, and Japanese rice.

The top 20 competed on their first mystery box challenge where Tum, Min, and Bo were called out to have 3 stand out dishes, unfortunately, those dishes stood out in bad ways and bad enough to send one of them home on the spot.

- Bottom three: Tum, Min and Bo

Tum was saved from elimination. Bo was sent home, leaving Min to be sent to safety

- Eliminated: Bo

The judges then declare one winner for the mystery box challenge and the winner is Miang

- Winner/Immune: Miang
- Invention Test 1

Miang got immunity from elimination and she got to choose for what the rest of the contestants would cook for their elimination challenge. She got the choice between: Cupcakes, Tarts and Doughnuts. She chose tarts. Miang also got to choose 4 home cooks to be saved as well. She chooses to save: Tong, Yuri, Belle, and Jon

- Immune: Tong, Yuri, Belle, and Jon

The unsafe contestants had to create a box of tarts that have 12 tarts 4 flavors and Lat and Deaw were declared as the top 2 of that challenge and are team captains of the next team challenge.

- Top two: Lat and Deaw

Deaw was declared the winner

- Winner: Deaw

Pung, Pimm, and Min had the worst dishes of this challenge

- Bottom three: Pung, Pimm, and Min

Pung was sent to safety. Pimm was eliminated from the competition sending Min to safety

- Eliminated: Pimm

=== Episode 3 ===
- Original airdate: Sunday 18 February 2018
- Team Challenge 1

The top 18 home cooks were sent to their first team challenge where they went to a shrine to serve Chinese food for Ah Kong R-Mar for 201 peoples. Each team must serve 1 dish of Chinese entrée food and 1 dish of desserts. They have time to cooking for 90 minutes and 60 minutes more to serve.

Team captain	Member
Deaw	Miang, Belle, First, Aim, Tong, Bank, Kapom and Tum
Lat	Golf, Jah, Annie, Yuri, Prae, Jon, Min, and Pung

- Winner Team: Blue
- Pressure Test 1: For the pressure test, the Red team is the lost team, But The captain can choose 3 people to get immune for the pressure test. Captain choose First, Belle, Miang. But Miang gives the immune to Deaw (Captain). For the pressure test. People who not got immune have 50 minutes to cook Unadon.
- Immune: First, Belle and Deaw
- Bottom three: Tum, Tong, and Miang
- Eliminated: Tong

=== Episode 4 ===
- Original airdate: Sunday 25 February 2018
- Mystery Box Challenge 2: The contestants had to prepare a dish using only the Mystery Box ingredients, that the main ingredient is the T-bone part Angus cattle from Australia. And the other ingredients are Scallop, Potato, Wonton sheet, Brussels sprout, Strawberry, Bird's eye chili, Mozzarella cheese, chicken egg, Eatable flower and salted crab. The contestants have 60 minutes to cook the dishes. Golf and Aim were the bottom two and got blame by the judges. Deaw, Bank and Jah were the top three. Jah won and got the privilege to control the invention test.
- Bottom two: Golf and Aim
- Winner/Immune: Jah
- Invention Test 2: Since Jah got the privilege to control the invention test. Jah got immune and can choose who to cook Entrée dish or to cook desserts. By peoples who got devil dolls have to cook desserts and peoples who didn't get have to cook Entrée dish. People who got devil dolls are Kapom, Jon, Deaw, Belle, Bank, Pung, First and Lat. The ingredient to compete in this round is a different kind of Solanaceae and have 60 minutes to cook the dish. Lat and First were the Best and they'll be Captain team in the next competition.
- Winner: Lat

Jon, Aim and Belle had the worst dishes of this challenge

- Bottom three: Jon, Aim and Belle
- Eliminated: Aim

=== Episode 5 ===
- Original airdate: Sunday 4 March 2018
- Team Challenge 2

The top 16 home cooks were sent to their second team challenge where they went to an IMPACT Lakeside to serve street food and desserts for Motorbikes driver for 251 peoples. Each team must serve 1 dish of entrée street food and 1 dish of desserts. They have time to cooking for 90 minutes and 60 minutes more to serve.

Team captain	Member
Lat	Jah, Golf, Bank, Kapom, Prae, Tum and Min
First	Yuri, Deaw, Jon, Annie, Belle, Pung and Miang

The blue team with a score of 179 scores. And the red team got only 72 scores.

- Winner Team: Blue
- Pressure Test 2: For the pressure test, the Red team is the lost team, But The captain of the winning team (First) can choose 4 people to get immune for the pressure test. First choose Kapom, Tum, Bank, and Min. For the pressure test, people who not got immune have to cook 3 different menus of an egg, Which have 3 rounds. A person who can do the best in each round will get immune.
  - Immune: Kapom, Tum, Bank, and Min
  - Round 1: The contestants who not got immune have to cook the poached egg within 10 minutes. Lat can do the best in round 1 so she got immune for the next round.
  - Round 1 Winner/Immune: Lat
  - Round 2: The other 3 people have to cook the perfect fried egg within 7 minutes. Jah can do the best in round 2 so she got immune for the last round.
  - Round 2 Winner/Immune: Jah
  - Round 3: The other 2 people have to cook the omu egg on top of the rice that already prepared within 5 minutes. Golf could do better than Prae so that Golf could go to the next round. Prae got eliminated
- Eliminated: Prae

=== Episode 6 ===
- Original airdate: Sunday 11 March 2018
- Mystery Box Challenge 3: The contestants had to prepare a dish using only the Mystery Box ingredients, that the main ingredient is Tako octopus which is the most expensive octopus in the world. And the other ingredients are Mirin, Purple cauliflower, Shoyu, Japanese Scallion, Red bean, All-purpose flour, Persimmon, Yuzu juice and Algae. The contestants have 60 minutes to cook the dishes. First, bank and Kapom were the top three. Kapom won and got the privilege to control the invention test.
- Top three: First, Bank and Kapom
- Winner/Immune: Kapom
- Invention Test 3: Since Kapom got the privilege to control the invention test. Kapom got immune and can choose the main ingredient to other contestants. The main ingredient is in a group of Local Thai ingredients. Which have Clarias, Wild boar, and backyard chickens. Kapom chooses backyard chickens to Golf, Jah, Tum, and Jon. Choose clarias to Lat, Miang, Pung, Belle, and Annie. Choose Wild boar to Bank, Deaw, Yuri, First and Min. Every contestant has 60 minutes to cook the dishes. Lat, Belle, First and Jah were the top four of this invention test.
- Winner: Jah

Jon and Golf had the worst dishes of this challenge because the main ingredient of both dishes still raw so that the judges can't taste these dishes.

- Bottom two: Jon and Golf
- Eliminated: Jon

=== Episode 7 ===
- Original airdate: Sunday 18 March 2018
- Team Challenge 3

The top 14 home cooks were sent to their third team challenge where they went to Hard Yao, Chonburi to serve food in condition of "Food that gives energy and stays full" that contains Proteins 50%, flavor 25%, and vegetables 25% for 501 boy scout and girl guide which age about 13–15 years old. Each team has time to cooking for 90 minutes and 60 minutes more to serve. Red team didn't serve 24 dishes to girl guide because the time had run out.

Team captain	Member
First	Kapom, Pung, Bank, Miang, Min and Deaw
Jah	Yuri, Golf, Lat, Belle, Annie and Tum

Blue team got a score of 347 scores while the red team got a score of 154 scores so that the blue team wins.

- Winner Team: Blue
- Pressure Test 3: For the pressure test, the Red team is the lost team. And have 45 minutes to cook Bánh xèo in palace people receipt.
- Bottom three: Kapom, First And Pung
- Eliminated: Pung

=== Episode 8 ===
- Original airdate: Sunday 25 March 2018
- Mystery Box Challenge 4: The contestants had to prepare a dish using only the Mystery Box ingredients, that the main ingredient is Sweetened condensed milk and other ingredients are apple, banana, soybean, hazelnut, butter, pandan, honey, vanilla pods, chocolates, berry and cream cheese with the condition of Desserts
  - Top three: Jah, Bank, and Lat
  - Winner/Immune: Bank
- Invention Test 4: Since the Bank won the mystery box challenge, Bank got immune can he can choose ingredients to other contestants which are in a group of "The best ingredients of the world". Which are Kobe A5 beef, Canadian lobster, and Sea cucumber. Bank choose sea cucumber to Annie, First, Belle and Kapom, choose Canadian lobster to Golf, Miang, Jah and Yuri and choose Kobe A5 beef to Tum, Min, Lat, and Deaw. Everyone has 60 minutes to cook the dish.
- Bottom three: Deaw, Miang, and Annie
- Eliminated: Annie

=== Episode 9 ===
- Original airdate: Sunday 1 April 2018
- Team Challenge 4 (Dual) In this round, the competition will be in dual. And for the menu to cook in this round is " Set of Dim sum". That has 5 types total of 16 pieces. Which are pork shumai, shrimp shumai, Foie gras Har gow, Haliotis Dim sum and shrimp with sesame. Which have Chef Pom Thanaruk Chuto demonstrates how to cook this of Dim sum. This competition has 90 minutes to cook this Dim sum and each person has 15 minutes to cook and switch with another person in the pair when heard the signal from judges. Since Min won last week competition, Min can choose the pair for others and herself. She paired Yuri and Belle, Jah and Kapom, Golf and Bank, First and Tum, Deaw and Miang and Min choose Lat for their own pair. After the judges taste all the pair of Dim sum, pair of Yuri and Belle couldn't serve all pieces of Dim sum and they couldn't work with a team as well. This made Yuri and Belle send to pressure test.
- Pressure Test 4 Since the pair of Yuri and Belle couldn't work with a team as well. They must do the pressure test, Which is competition one by one. And for the menu to cook for pressure test is "Medium rare jumbo steak" serve with mashed potato and fried onion flower shaped. Each person has 40 minutes to cook this menu. After the judges taste Belle and Yuri dishes, both couldn't cook mashed potato and fried onion flower shaped as well. But Yuri could cook Jumbo steak to medium rare level, but Belle cook just only a rare level. This made Belle eliminated.
- Eliminated: Belle

=== Episode 10 ===
- Original airdate: Sunday 8 April 2018
- Team Challenge 5 In this team challenges, the judges chose Yuri, Golf and Tum, who to date did not win any mystery box challenges or invention tests, to be team captains. Other contestants had to run to the captain team. Jah and Bank choose Golf. And Lat, Min, Minag, Deaw, First and Kapom choose Yuri and no one chooses Tum. Tum was dissolved into Team Golf. Yuri sent Kapom to Team Golf to make the teams more balanced.

Team Captain	Member
Yuri	First, Deaw, Lat, Miang and Min
Golf	Bank, Jah, Tum and Kapom

For this Team Challenge, all contestants were taken to House No.1, where two teams had to cook a course of authentic ancient Thai food to 61 noble descendants, bearing honorifics of Mom Rajawongse, Mom Luang, those bearing na Ayudhya family titles, as well as other members of the nobility. Since the nobility had access to highly refined Thai cuisine and some families may also have their own culinary styles, the judges were highly familiar with authentic Thai cuisine. This made the challenge particularly demanding on both teams. Some of the guests were particular on the balance of flavors presented in the plate.

Both teams had 120 minutes to cook the entrees and desserts and 60 minutes to serve. The blue team failed to serve 17 desserts because the time had run out, but still emerged victorious with 40-21 votes.

- Winner team/Immune: Blue team
- Pressure test 5: In this pressure test, the red team was which lost the earlier challenge will have their worst 2 contestants eliminated. The theme was egg sausage in dried red curry. All contestants in the red team had 1 hour and 15 minutes to cook this menu.
- Bottom three: Miang, Min, and Deaw
- Eliminated: Miang and Min

=== Episode 11 ===
- Original airdate: Sunday 15 April 2018
- The remaining contestants making food by Masterchef Kitchen.
- Bottom two: Golf and Kapom
- Eliminated: Golf

=== Episode 12 ===
- Original airdate: Sunday 22 April 2018
- Team Challenge 6

Team Captain	Member
Tum	Yuri, Bank and Lat
Jah	Kapom, Deaw and First

After the team challenge, the Blue team won which made them all immune from elimination.

- Bottom three: First and Kapom
- Eliminated: Kapom

=== Episode 13 ===
- Original airdate: Sunday 29 April 2018
- The remaining contestant making by MasterChef Kitchen.
- Bottom two: Lat and Yuri
- Eliminated: Yuri

=== Episode 14 ===
- Original airdate: Sunday 6 May 2018
- Team Challenge 7

Team Captain	Member
Tum	Lat and Bank
Jah	Deaw and First

After the team challenge, the Red team won which made them all immune from elimination.

- Tum is eliminated.
- Bottom two: Bank and Tum
- Eliminated: Tum

=== Episode 15 ===
- Original airdate: Sunday 13 May 2018
- Mystery Box Challenge
- Top Three : Deaw, Jah, Lat
- Winner : Jah
- Invention Test : Jah won the Mystery Box and was allowed to pick the theme of the Invention Test, from three national themes (Italian, Japanese and Indian). However, she was not given immunity. Jah picked Italian for herself and Indian for the other contestants, commenting that she preferred to "challenge herself." This act of self-challenge backfired as Jah was eliminated, along with Bank.
- Eliminated: Bank and Jah

=== Episode 16 ===
- Original airdate: Sunday 20 May 2018
- Challenge Winners: Lat
- Pressure Test : Deaw and First
- Eliminated: Deaw

In this "fine dining" challenge, six previously eliminated contestants (Bank, Golf, Jah, Kapom, Tum, Yuri) were invited to become sous-chefs of the three standing. Drafting was done by drawing lots.

Contestant	Sous-chef Members
Deaw	Golf and Jah
Lat	Kapom and Tum
First	Bank and Yuri

The food was served to thirty Michelin Star and Michelin Plate chefs, making the episode one of the largest congregations of professional chefs in the show's history. Lat won the first contest and advanced to the Finale, leaving the other two to fight for survival.

The Pressure Test was a course of two plates, consisting of "Salmon Steak with Hollandaise Sauce" and "Churros, Chocolate Mousse, and Passion Fruit Dome". Both highly precise and particular plates were to be made from scratch, i.e. steak made from filleting the fish, sauce from beating egg and butter, and so on. After a narrow 3-2 decision (points based on judges' collective criteria, see table below), Deaw was eliminated at the end of the day.

Judge Criteria Breakdown
Criteria	Awarded to
Salmon	First
Hollandaise Sauce	First
Passion Fruit Dome	Deaw
Chocolate Mousse	Deaw
Churros	First

=== Episode 17 ===
- Original airdate: Sunday 27 May 2018
- MasterChef Thailand Winner: First

This episode consists of a head-to-head duel on a three-course meal with an appetizer, a main course, and a dessert. Both contestants, coming from the Northern region, decided to use their regional specialties. The three chefs served as judges. All previously eliminated contestants were invited as an audience.
