= MasterChef Thailand Celebrity =

Thai competitive cooking reality show

- Genre: Cookery
- Created by: Franc Roddam
- Directed by: Kitikorn Penrote
- Presented by: Piyathida Mittiraroch
- Judges: Pasan Svastivatana; Kwantip Devakula; Pongtawat Chalermkittichai
- Country of origin: Thailand
- Original language: Thai
- No. of seasons: 3
- No. of episodes: 8 (2020); 11 (2021); 12 (2022)

Production
- Executive producer: Kitikorn Penrote
- Running time: 90 minutes
- Production company: Heliconia H GROUP

Original release
- Network: Channel 7 Channel 7 HD
- Release: November 1, 2020 – present

Related
- MasterChef Junior Thailand; MasterChef Thailand; MasterChef Thailand All-Stars

MasterChef Celebrity Thailand is the Thai version of the competitive reality TV series MasterChef which premiered on Channel 7 on November 1, 2020.

This cycle continues until there's 2-4 chefs remaining. The winner will receive ฿1,000,000 to donate to their selected foundation and the MasterChef championship belt.

== Hosts and judges ==
| Judges | Season | | |
| Judges | Celebrity 1 | Celebrity 2 | Celebrity 3 |
|---|---|---|---|
| Pasan Svastivatana | ✔ | ✔ | ✔ |
| Kwantip Devakula | ✔ | ✔ | ✔ |
| Pongtawat Chalermkittichai | ✔ | ✔ | ✔ |
| Hosts | Season | | |
| Hosts | Celebrity 1 | Celebrity 2 | Celebrity 3 |
| Piyathida Mittiraroch | ✔ | ✔ | ✔ |

=== Seasons ===
| Season | Premiere date | Finale date | No. of Finalists | Winner | Runner-up(s) | Judge |
|---|---|---|---|---|---|---|
| Celebrity 1 | November 1, 2020 | December 20, 2020 | 10 | Pitt Karchai | Patiparn Patavekarn, Nuengtida Sophon & Paweenut Pangnakorn | Kwantip Devakula; Pasan Svastivatana; Pongtawat Chalermkittichai |
| Celebrity 2 | October 3, 2021 | December 26, 2021 | 12 | Unnop Thongborisut | Passakorn Ponlaboon & Shawankorn Wanthanapisitkul | Kwantip Devakula; Pasan Svastivatana; Pongtawat Chalermkittichai |
| Celebrity 3 | October 9, 2022 | December 25, 2022 | 14 | Darunee Sutiphitak | Ornjira Lamwilai, Pongsakorn Tosuwan & Khemarat Suntaranon | Kwantip Devakula; Pasan Svastivatana; Pongtawat Chalermkittichai |

== See also ==
- MasterChef Junior Thailand
- MasterChef Thailand
- MasterChef Thailand All-Stars
