= MasterChef Thailand =

Thai competitive cooking reality show

- Genre: Reality competition; Cookery
- Created by: Franc Roddam
- Directed by: Kitikorn Penrote
- Presented by: Piyathida Mittiraroch
- Judges: Pasan Svastivatana; Kwantip Devakula; Pongtawat Chalermkittichai
- Country of origin: Thailand
- Original language: Thai
- No. of seasons: 7
- No. of episodes: 103

Production
- Executive producer: Kitikorn Penrote
- Running time: 90 minutes
- Production company: Heliconia H GROUP

Original release
- Network: Channel 7 Channel 7 HD
- Release: June 4, 2017 – present

Related
- MasterChef Junior Thailand; MasterChef Thailand All-Stars; MasterChef Thailand Celebrity

MasterChef Thailand (Thai: มาสเตอร์เชฟไทยแลนด์) is a Thai competitive cooking reality show, based on the original British series of MasterChef, open to amateur and home chefs. Produced by Heliconia H Group, it debuted on June 4, 2017, on Channel 7 and Channel 7 HD.

== Format ==
MasterChef Thailand is based on the BBC British version of MasterChef. Pasan Svastivatana, Kwantip Devakula, and Pongtawat Chalermkittichai were the original judges of the Thai version of MasterChef, with Piyathida Mittiraroch being the host.

In the first few episodes, the initial home cooks would undergo a final audition that varies season-by-season:

- Season 1: The home cooks would prepare a signature dish for the judges to taste. They would need at least 2 "yes" votes from the judges to move on. Those home cooks would then be trimmed down to about sixteen challenges via a skill test (such as dicing and slicing gingers) and an invention test, where they have to create a dish with a main ingredient being used.
- Season 2 and Season 3: The home cooks would undergo two invention tests to determine the final set of contestants to compete for the rest of the season.
- Season 4: The home cooks would participate in the battle for a white apron, where home cooks are pitted together, based on their skills, to compete for a white apron. Home cooks who lost the battles are invited for a second chance to win the apron by a team challenge and a pressure test.
- Season 5: The home cooks would undergo two skill tests, with the home cooks who made a mistake being eliminated on-the-spot. Some of the eliminated home cooks are invited back for a second chance to win the apron by a team challenge and an invention test.
- Season 6: The home cooks would undergo four invention tests to determine the final set of contestants to compete for the rest of the season.
- Season 7: The home cooks undergo series of challenges including skill tests, signature dish, and invention test to determine the contestants receiving the apron of this season.

Subsequently, the formal competition begins typically following a 4-event cycle that takes place over 2 episodes, with one chef eliminated after the second and fourth event. The events typically are:

- Mystery Box: Contestants were given the same ingredients and must use only those ingredients to make a dish within an amount of time given. The winner of this event will be given an advantage in the next event.
- Invention Test: The judges take the mystery box winner to the pantry, privately explain the theme of the elimination test, and tell of at least one advantage. The advantage is typically the choosing of the main ingredient for the invention test. Other advantages include, more shopping time, choosing a specific ingredient for each contestants, or immunity. The rest then asked to invent a dish based on the main ingredient. The top 2 contestants will be the team captain of the next team challenge. Then, the judges nominate at least three contestants for elimination, with one being eliminated and asked to "leave the MasterChef Kitchen", leaving their apron at their station.
- Team Challenge: The contestants usually are taken to an off-site location where they will be split into 2 teams, red and blue, with the winner of the invention test choosing first. Then, the team are tasked to prepare and serve a meal to a number of diners in a limited amount of time. The team that has the most votes from the diners are the winners of the challenge, with the losing team having to compete in the pressure test when they're back at the MasterChef Kitchen.
- Pressure Test: The losing team of the previous challenge are tasked to recreate the dish given by the judges in a fixed amount of time. Sometimes, not all of the losing team contestants will compete in this round in which someone receiving an exemption given by either the team captain or the judges. Each dish is judged based on the taste, the appearance, and sometimes, the accuracy of the dish. The contestant that performed the worst in the event will be eliminated from the competition.

Other events that rarely happen during the competition include:

- Reinstation challenge: The eliminated contestants competed in a special mystery box challenge and pressure test. The contestant that wins both rounds will be reinstated back in the competition.
- Tag-team challenge: A variation of the team challenge. The contestants are divided into either pairs or teams. They are usually asked to recreate a dish given by the judges. The contestants in the team must switch every time the judges asked them to switch. (typically every 15 minutes) The winning team of the challenge will be the team captains in the team challenge, with the losing team being up for elimination.

This cycle continues until there's 2-4 chefs remaining. The winner will receive ฿1,000,000, their own MasterChef cookbook, and the MasterChef trophy.

== Hosts and judges ==
Judges	Season											
Judges	1	2	3	All-Stars	Celebrity 1	4	Celebrity 2	5	Celebrity 3	6	The Professionals	7
Pasan Svastivatana	✔	✔	✔	✔	✔	✔	✔	✔	✔	✔	✔	✔
Kwantip Devakula	✔	✔	✔	✔	✔	✔	✔	✔	✔	✔	✔	✔
Pongtawat Chalermkittichai	✔	✔	✔	✔	✔	✔	✔	✔	✔	✔	✔	✔
Hosts	Season											
Hosts	1	2	3	All-Stars	Celebrity 1	4	Celebrity 2	5	Celebrity 3	6	The Professionals	7
Piyathida Mittiraroch	✔	✔	✔	✔	✔	✔	✔	✔	✔	✔	✔	✔

=== Main seasons ===
Season	Premiere date	Finale date	No. of Finalists	Winner	Runner-up(s)
1	June 4, 2017	September 24, 2017	16	Paweenuch Yodpreechawijit	Alisa Dawson
2	February 4, 2018	May 27, 2018	20	Thanapat Suyao	Nalat Chiraveerakul
3	February 3, 2019	June 9, 2019	19	Nuntawat Chanyalikit	Patcha Kalyanamitr & Chanin Cheema
4	February 21, 2021	July 11, 2021	16	Pornchanan Pattanapanyasat	Nuttawat Kasamvilas & Paniti Tangsatanan
5	February 13, 2022	June 19, 2022	27	Angkrit Chuer-am	Chanidapa Pornpinit
6	June 11, 2023	October 8, 2023	17	Valasura Na Lampang	Araya Siri & Wasurat Kaewwichit
7	February 15, 2026	May 31, 2026	20	Thiti Thongborisut	Newporn Phalang & Natchanon Suwan & Ploypailin Thongyod

=== Spin-off seasons ===
Season	Premiere date	Finale date	No. of Finalists	Winner	Runner-up(s)
All-Stars	February 2, 2020	August 2, 2020	20	Jessica Wang	Namthip Phoosri & Chanin Cheema
The Professionals	February 9, 2025	June 1, 2025	18	Saharat Taengthai	Wisakha Ravijan

=== Celebrity seasons ===
Season	Premiere date	Finale date	No. of Finalists	Winner	Runner-up(s)
Celebrity 1	November 1, 2020	December 20, 2020	10	Pitt Karchai	Patiparn Patavekarn; Nuengtida Sophon; Paweenut Pangnakorn
Celebrity 2	October 3, 2021	December 26, 2021	12	Unnop Thongborisut	Passakorn Ponlaboon; Shawankorn Wanthanapisitkul
Celebrity 3	October 9, 2022	December 25, 2022	14	Darunee Sutiphitak	Ornjira Lamwilai; Pongsakorn Tosuwan; Khemarat Suntaranon

== Season synopsis ==
=== Season 1: 2017 ===
The first season of MasterChef Thailand was broadcast between 4 June 2017 and 24 September 2017. Applications for contestants closed on 8 April 2017, with subsequent auditions held in Bangkok.

=== Season 2: 2018 ===
The second season of MasterChef Thailand was broadcast between 4 February 2018 and 27 May 2018. Applications for contestants were opened on 25 September 2017, a day after the first season ended.

=== Season 3: 2019 ===
The third season of MasterChef Thailand was broadcast between 3 February 2019 and 9 June 2019. Applications for contestants were opened on 16 December 2018, a week after the first season of Masterchef Junior ended.

=== Season 4: 2021 ===
The fourth season of MasterChef Thailand was broadcast between 21 February 2021 and 11 July 2021. Applications for contestants were opened on 6 December 2020, as the first season of MasterChef Celebrity was broadcasting at the time.

=== Season 5: 2022 ===
The fifth season of MasterChef Thailand was broadcast between 13 February 2022 and 19 June 2022. Applications for contestants were opened on 6 October 2021.

=== Season 6: 2023 ===
The sixth season of MasterChef Thailand was broadcast between 11 June 2023 and 8 October 2023. Applications for contestants were opened on 28 February 2023.

=== Season 7: 2026 ===
The seventh season of MasterChef Thailand was broadcast between 15 February 2026 and 31 May 2026. Applications for contestants were opened on 22 August 2025.

== Awards ==
Years	Award giver	Category	Recipient	Result
2018	7th Daradaily Awards	Best TV Program	MasterChef Thailand season 1	Won
2018	Fever Awards 2017 (Thailand)	Fever's TV Show	MasterChef Thailand season 1	Won
2018	9th Nataraj Awards	Best Variety Show	MasterChef Thailand season 1	Won
2019	10th Nataraj Awards	Best Game Show	MasterChef Thailand season 2	Won
2019	Asian Academy Creative Awards 2019	Best Adaptation of an Existing Format	MasterChef Junior Thailand season 1	Nominated
2020	24th Asian Television Awards	Best Adaptation of an Existing Format	MasterChef Junior Thailand	Won
2020	11th Nataraj Awards	Best Game Show	MasterChef Thailand season 3	Won
2020	48th International Emmy Awards	Non-Scripted Entertainment	MasterChef Thailand season 3	Nominated
2021	Fever Awards 2020 (Thailand)	Fever's TV Show	MasterChef Thailand All-Stars	Won
2021	Fever Awards 2020 (Thailand)	Fever's Host/Presenters	Piyathida Mittiraroch, Kwantip Devakula, Pasan Sawasdiwat & Pongtawat Chalermkittichai	Won
2021	12th Nataraj Awards	Best Game Show	MasterChef Thailand All-Stars	Won
2021	12th Nataraj Awards	Best Game Show	MasterChef Thailand Celebrity season 1	Nominated
2022	1st Pantip Television Awards	Best Game Show	MasterChef Thailand season 4	Won
2022	13th Nataraj Awards	Best Game Show	MasterChef Thailand season 4	Won
2022	13th Nataraj Awards	Best Game Show	MasterChef Thailand Celebrity season 2	Nominated
2023	14th Nataraj Awards	Best Game Show	MasterChef Thailand season 5	Won
2023	2nd Pantip Television Awards	Best Game Show	MasterChef Thailand season 5	Won
2024	3rd Pantip Television Awards	Best Game Show	MasterChef Thailand season 6	Won
2024	15th Nataraj Awards	Best Game Show & Competition	MasterChef Thailand season 6	Won
2025	4th Pantip Television Awards	Best Youth TV Show	MasterChef Junior Thailand season 3	Nominated
2025	16th Nataraj Awards	Best Youth TV Show	MasterChef Junior Thailand season 3	Nominated
2025	Maya TV Awards 2025	Best Variety (Reality) Show	MasterChef The Professionals Thailand	Won
2025	Asian Academy Creative Awards 2025	Best Adaptation of an Existing Format (Non-Scripted)	MasterChef The Professionals Thailand	Nominated
2026	5th Pantip Television Awards	Best Game Show	MasterChef The Professionals Thailand	Nominated
2026	17th Nataraj Awards	Best Game Show & Competition	MasterChef The Professionals Thailand	Nominated

== See also ==
- MasterChef Junior Thailand
- MasterChef Thailand All-Stars
- MasterChef Thailand Celebrity
