= MasterChef Thailand season 3 =

MasterChef Thailand
- Season 3
- No. of episodes: 17

Release
- Original network: Channel 7 HD
- Original release: February 3 – June 9, 2019

Season chronology
- ← Previous; Season 2 Next → Season 4

The third season of MasterChef Thailand is the Thai version of the competitive reality TV series MasterChef, which premiered on Channel 7 on February 3, 2019. Hosted by Piyathida Mittiraroch, this season welcomes back the original judge panel of the franchise, consists of Pasan Svastivatana, Kwantip Devakula, and Pongtawat Chalermkittichai. It has received more than 3,000 applicants from across the country, and only 30 have qualified for the audition round. Among those in the audition, 19 were chosen to be the official contestants.

Nuntawat "Max" Chanyalikit becomes the winner of this season, alongside Patcha "Toei" Kalyanamitr and Chanin "Quest" Cheema, who both finished as the runner-ups. One year later, in November 2020, the series made history as Thailand's first MasterChef season to be nominated in the International Emmy Awards for Non-Scripted Entertainment.

== Contestants ==
Top 19

Contestant	Age	Hometown	Occupation	Status	Number of Wins
Nuntawat Chanyalikit (Max)	36	Bangkok	Flight attendant	Winner on June 9	5
Patcha Kalyanamitr (Toei)	26	Bangkok	Shoe painting business owner	Runners-up on June 9	8
Chanin Cheema (Quest)	26	Bangkok	Painter	Runners-up on June 9	4
Jessica Wang (Paope)	24	Bangkok	Self-employed	Eliminated on May 26	4
Sahadol Tantrapim (Pond)	27	Chiang Mai	Flight attendant	Eliminated on May 26	3
Suchat Jaicham (Ball)	30	Nakhon Nayok	Shrimp farming owner	Eliminated on May 19	6
Chanon Ruangsri	23	Uthai Thani	Trader	Eliminated on May 12	4
Rapassa Sirilertsopon (Lukkate)	35	Bangkok	Dessert Cookery Teacher	Eliminated on April 28	3
Jitsak Lim-pakornkul (Gino)	42	Phuket	Brand and marketing Director	Eliminated on April 28	2
Aekkarat Wachirathongpaisarn (Aek)	30	Udon Thani	Freelance	Eliminated on April 14	1
Nathinee Jiamprasert (New)	38	Samut Prakan	Employee	Eliminated on April 7	2
Saichon Sornprasert (Robert)	40	Bangkok	Trader	Eliminated on March 31	0
Chatchasa Aupichit (Nuey)	34	Nonthaburi	Marketing freelance	Eliminated on March 17	1
Phakin Meejinda (Mark)	19	Udon Thani	Student	Eliminated on March 10	1
Nathakhun Laonoonchai (Perth)	21	Bangkok	Student	Eliminated on March 3	1
Sorakom Kaewsamerta (Ram)	39	Chiang Mai	Real estate developer	Eliminated on February 24	0
Naphat Hempattarasuwan (Jringjung)	25	Nan	Student	Eliminated on February 17	0
Piyakorn Ouypron (Mind)	24	Khon Kaen	Doctor	Eliminated on February 10	0
Kornrawee Thitiamonvit (Korn)	44	Suphan Buri	Image consultant	Eliminated on February 10	0

Future appearances:

- Toei was one of the special guests in Episode 3 of Junior Season 2.
- Exactly one year after, MasterChef All-Stars premiered featuring past contestants. Eight contestants in Top 9 of this season (excluding Max who won) returned to compete. Paope won the season while Quest became the runner-up for the 2nd time.
- Max appeared as one of the special guests in Episode 12 of All-Stars. He later showed up as part of the audience in the grand finale.
- Max, Quest and Paope appeared as one of the chef helpers in Celebrity Season 1. Paope later returned again as a chef helper in Episode 2 of Celebrity Season 3.
- In Team Challenge of Episode 10 of Season 4, Ball hosted his own wedding, where he married his wife. Many contestants from this season were among the guest judges. Some contestants that came including Quest, Paope, Pond, Chanon, Lukkate, Gino, Aek, Robert, Nuey, Ram and Korn.
- Paope appeared as one of the special guests in Episode 6 of Celebrity Season 2.
- In 2025, Max and Quest returned to compete in The Professionals. Quest made into the grand finale once again despite not winning the title.
- Paope and Gino showed up as part of the audience in the grand finale of The Professionals season.
- Pond went to compete in MasterChef Asia (2026) that premiered in late-September, representing Thailand.

== Elimination table ==
Place	Contestant	Episode																							
Place	Contestant	2		3	4		5		6	7		8	9		10		11	12		13	14		15		16/17
1	Max	IN	IMM	PT	IN	IN	HIGH	IMM	LOW	IN	IN	WIN	WIN	IMM	IN	IMM	WIN	IMM	IN	WIN	IN	IN	IN	LOW	WINNER
2	Quest	HIGH	IMM	WIN	HIGH	IN	WIN	IMM	PT	HIGH	HIGH	WIN	HIGH	IN	IN	IMM	PT	IN	HIGH	PT	HIGH	LOW	LOW	WIN	RUNNERS-UP
2	Toei	WIN	IMM	WIN	IN	IN	IN	IMM	WIN	IN	WIN	PT	IN	IN	LOW	PT	WIN	IMM	WIN	WIN	WIN	IMM	IN	PT	RUNNERS-UP
4	Paope	IN	IMM	WIN	IN	IMM	HIGH	IMM	WIN	IN	IN	WIN	HIGH	IN	WIN	IMM	PT	IN	IN	PT	IN	IN	IN	ELIM	
5	Pond	IN	IMM	PT	IN	IMM	IN	IN	PT	WIN	IMM	PT	IN	IN	LOW	LOW	WIN	IMM	IN	WIN	HIGH	IN	ELIM		
6	Ball	IN	IMM	WIN	WIN	IMM	IN	HIGH	WIN	IN	IN	PT	IN	LOW	WIN	IMM	WIN	IMM	LOW	WIN	IN	ELIM			
7	Chanon	IN	IMM	WIN	IN	IN	IN	IN	WIN	HIGH	IN	WIN	IN	WIN	LOW	PT	PT	LOW	LOW	ELIM					
8	Lukkate	LOW	IN	WIN	IN	IMM	IN	IMM	WIN	HIGH	LOW	WIN	IN	IN	LOW	PT	PT	IN	ELIM						
9	Gino	IN	IMM	WIN	HIGH	WIN	IN	IMM	NPT	IN	LOW	PT	IN	LOW	LOW	LOW	PT	ELIM							
10	Aek	IN	IMM	LOW	IN	IMM	IN	IN	WIN	IN	IN	LOW	IN	IN	LOW	ELIM									
11	New	IN	IMM	PT	IN	LOW	IN	IMM	WIN	IN	IN	WIN	IN	ELIM											
12	Robert	HIGH	IMM	LOW	IN	IMM	IN	LOW	NPT	IN	IN	ELIM													
13	Nuey	LOW	LOW	WIN	IN	IN	IN	IMM	NPT	IN	ELIM														
14	Mark	IN	IMM	PT	IN	LOW	IN	WIN	ELIM																
15	Perth	LOW	IN	WIN	IN	IN	IN	ELIM																	
16	Ram	LOW	IN	PT	IN	ELIM																			
17	Jringjung	IN	IMM	ELIM																					
18	Mind	LOW	ELIM																						
18	Korn	LOW	ELIM																						

(WINNER) This cook won the competition.
(RUNNER-UP) This cook finished in second place.
(WIN) The cook won an individual challenge (Mystery box challenge or Invention Test).
(WIN) The cook was on the winning team in the "Team challenge" and directly advanced to the next round.
(HIGH) The cook was one of the top entries in an individual challenge, but didn't win.
(IN) The cook wasn't selected as a top or bottom entry in an individual challenge.
(IN) The cook wasn't selected as a top or bottom entry in a team challenge.
(IMM) The cook didn't have to compete in that round of the competition and was safe from elimination.
(PT) The cook was on the losing team in the Team challenge and competed in the Pressure test.
(PT) The cook didn't have to compete in the Team challenge but competed in the Pressure test.
(NPT) The cook was on the losing team in the Team challenge, did not compete in the Pressure test, and advanced.
(RET) The cook won the Reinstation Challenge and returned to the competition.
(LOW) The cook was one of the bottom entries in an individual challenge, but wasn't the last person to advance.
(LOW) The cook was one of the bottom entries in an individual challenge, and the last person to advance.
(LOW) The cook was one of the bottom entries in the Team challenge and they were the only person from their team to advance.
(LOW) The cook was one of the bottom entries in the Team challenge, and their team was last to advance.
(ELIM) The cook was eliminated from MasterChef.

== Episodes ==
=== Episode 1 ===
- Original airdate: Sunday 3 February 2019

30 contestants started the competition, but only 19 will advance to the next round. In the first round of auditions Quest, Max, Chanon, Aek, Toei, Pond, Ram, Mark, Jringjung, Perth, Nuey, New, Mind, Korn and Lukkate won their aprons.

- Eliminated: Boom, Ton, Golf, Fang, and Loom

The 10 remaining contestants are given another chance to win their aprons, but in a twist the judges will eliminate those that made the worst dishes immediately. In this round Paope, Robert, and Ball won their aprons and Gino won the last spot in the Top 19.

- Eliminated Immediately: Q and Korn
- Eliminated: Maprang, Xngun, Pan Pan, and Arm

=== Episode 2 ===
- Original airdate: Sunday 10 February 2019

Mystery Box Challenge 1: Main ingredient: Durian

- Time: 60 minutes (1 hour)
- Three best dishes: Quest, Robert and Toei
- Winner: Toei

In this round, the judges have picked six bottom dishes below. For the rest that did not get called (including the three best dishes) may immune to the next round.

- Bottom six: Perth, Korn, Lukkate, Nuey, Ram and Mind

Invention Test 1: Main ingredient: Khaki (Pork legs)

- Time: 60 minutes (1 hour)
- Bottom three: Nuey, Korn and Mind

After this round ends, Nuey, Korn and Mind got chosen as bottom three. Since Toei won the Mystery Box round, she gets to save one contestant from three. As a result, Toei chose to save Nuey.

- Eliminated: Mind and Korn

=== Episode 3 ===
- Original airdate: Sunday 17 February 2019

Team Challenge 1: Cook bento set with desert (Thai cuisine) for 201 banana boat riders.

- Location: Nonthaburi Pier

Since Toei wins the first mystery box, she get to choose her own teammates from the 17 contestants. She chose Chanon, Quest, Perth, Ball, Nuey, Gino, Lukkate, and Paope. The rest will be formed as a team and get to choose their own team captain, which is Robert.

Team captain	Members
Toei	Perth, Chanon, Nuey, Ball, Quest, Lukkate, Gino and Paope
Robert	Ram, Mark, Aek, Pond, New, Max and Jringjung

For the bento set, both teams need to have five different servings with a dessert in Thai cuisine for 201 banana boat riders.

- Time: 90 minutes for preparing, and 60 minutes for serving.

As a result, red team won blue team with score of 123 to 78.

- Winners: Red team

Pressure Test 1: Deep-fried catfish

Original: The deep-fried catfish needs to be crispy, and has a diameter at least seven inches. They also need to serve it with Yum Mango.

- Time: 50 minutes
- Bottom three: Robert, Aek and Jringjung
- Eliminated: Jringjung

=== Episode 4 ===
- Original airdate: Sunday 24 February 2019

Mystery Box Challenge 2: Beef offal

For this week's mystery box is the beef offal, in which the contestants will not know what parts will they receive. Before opening, the contestants have to go into the supermarket for their menu. After opening, there are eight different parts, which including tenderloin, sirloin, calf, and T-bone in easy, blood and cowhide in medium, tail and testicles in challenging.

- Time: 60 min. (1 hour)
- Three best dishes: Quest, Ball and Gino
- Winner: Ball

Invention Test 2: Main ingredient: Cow gut

- Time: For this round, each contestants will receive a different amount of times, which are 60 min, 45 min, and 30 min, managed by Ball. He chose to have 60 min for Toei, Nuey, New, Perth and Gino, 45 min for Chanon, Quest, Max, Ram and Mark, and 30 min for Aek, Lukkate, Robert, Pond and Paope. Instead, people with 30 minutes get to immune to the next round.
- Winner: Gino
- Bottom three: New, Mark and Ram
- Eliminated: Ram

=== Episode 5 ===
- Original airdate: Sunday 3 March 2019

Mystery Box Challenge 3: Canned food to fine-dining

Since Gino won the last round, he deserves a chance to take away 10 cans from a contestant, which is Ball.

- Time: 60 min (1 hour)
- Three best dishes: Max, Quest and Paope
- Winner: Quest

Invention Test 3: Main ingredient: Stingray.

In this round, Quest get to choose her seven opponents to compete. She chose to have Ball, Mark, Aek, Robert, Pond, Chanon and Perth. The rest that didn't get called may immune to the next round.

- Time: 60 minutes (1 hour)

As a result, Mark did the best, Ball in second.

- Winner: Mark
- Bottom two: Robert and Perth
- Eliminated: Perth

=== Episode 6 ===
- Original airdate: Sunday 10 March 2019

Team Challenge 2: Cook main dish with a dessert for 302 students and 11 principals.

- Location: Tea Oil and Plant Oils Development Center- Chiang Rai

For today's team challenge, all 14 contestants receive a 75-minute free flight to Chiang Rai, which is more than 900 kilometers away from Bangkok.

Mark and Ball, winners from the previous challenge, now get to choose their own teammates. After choosing, the judges have them switch teammates that they've chosen.

Team captain	Members
Mark	Quest, Robert, Pond, Gino, Max and Nuey
Ball	New, Paope, Toei, Aek, Lukkate and Chanon

Today, both teams have to cook main dish with a dessert for 302 students age 7-10 using ONLY veggies and grains. Plus, they also have to cook them to Dr. Sumet Tantivejkul, a Secretary General of the Chaipattana Foundation, with faculty principals of 11 people within the development center.

- Time: 2 hours for preparing, 60 minutes (1 hour) for serving.

As a result, red team won blue team with the score of 163 to 150.

- Winners: Red team

Pressure Test 2: Raspberry soufflé

In this round, Mark, the team captain, get to choose his three teammates to immune to the next round. He choose to save Nuey, Gino, and Quest. Instead, that chance now belongs to the team captain from the winning team, which is Ball. He decided to save Nuey, Gino, and Robert.

- Save: Nuey, Robert and Gino

For this pressure test, Mark, Quest, Pond, and Max have to face a challenge from a special guest: Chef Gai Thananya Wilkinson. Her signature dish today for the four contestants to complete is Raspberry soufflé.

- Time: 45 minutes

As a result, there are three people whose soufflé are not fully cooked. However, Max and Mark are the bottom two, because their soufflé were more undercooked.

- Bottom two: Max and Mark
- Eliminated: Mark

=== Episode 7 ===
- Original airdate: Sunday 17 March 2019

Mystery Box Challenge 4: Japanese ingredients + lobsters into modern cuisines.

- Time: 60 minutes (1 hour)
- Four best dishes: Quest, Lukkate, Pond and Chanon
- Winner: Pond

Invention Test 4: Making a dessert dish

In this round, Pond gets to choose a main ingredient to the 12 other contestants. He chose:

(From easiest to hardest)

Main ingredient	People
Mixed berries	Ball, Robert, Max and Paope
Coconut	Nuey, New, Chanon and Lukkate
Bitter melon	Gino, Aek, Toei and Quest

- Time: 90 minutes

After the taste, Toei did the best, Quest in second.

- Winner: Toei
- Bottom three: Lukkate, Gino and Nuey
- Eliminated: Nuey

=== Episode 8 ===
- Original airdate: Sunday 31 March 2019

Team Challenge 3: Cook 3 different flavor sausages to 101 paramotor riders.

- Location: Si Racha, Chonburi

Today's team picking will be different. Both Toei and Quest have to select team members for the other team. Since Toei ranks first last week, she gets to pick first.

Team captain	Members
Toei	Pond, Robert, Aek, Ball and Gino
Quest	Paope, Max, Chanon, Lukkate and New

For today's team challenge, both teams have to cook three different flavor sausages with two sides to 101 paramotor riders. There are conditions to both teams that the sausages needs to be creative, and weigh at least 100 grams each.

- Time: 90 minutes for preparing, 60 minutes (1 hour) for serving.

As a result, red team won blue team with score of 71 to 30.

- Winners: Red team

Pressure Test 3: Ravioli egg-yolk

Original: The egg yolk needs to be raw after the judge cuts down the ravioli. The pasta needs to be fully cooked, and has a diameter of at least four inches. They also need to create their own sauce and the fillings in the dish.

- Time: 40 minutes
- Bottom two: Robert and Aek
- Eliminated: Robert

=== Episode 9 ===
- Original airdate: Sunday 7 April 2019

Mystery Box Challenge 5: Making desserts without milk and cream.

- Time: 90 minutes
- Three best dishes: Quest, Max and Paope
- Winner: Max

Invention Test 5: Main ingredient: Frogs

For today's invention test, Max gets to choose a main ingredient for everyone to cook. There are quails, frogs, and eels. In these three choices, Max chose frogs for everyone to compete. After the rest of 10 contestants get to shop in the supermarket, Max deserves another chance to switch all of four people's ingredients that they have brought. Max chose Quest and Aek to switch, also did Ball and Toei.

- Time: 60 minutes (1 hour)
- Winner: Chanon
- Bottom three: Ball, Gino and New
- Eliminated: New

=== Episode 10 ===
- Original airdate: Sunday 14 April 2019

Team Challenge 4: Cook an assigned Korean cuisine set (in pairs).

Since Chanon won the last challenge, he deserves a chance to pair up every contestants including himself, in which he chose:

Groups	Members
1	Gino and Lukkate
2	Quest and Max
3	Pond and Toei
4	Ball and Paope
5	Chanon and Aek

There is a special guest today which is Chef Art, who will be given today's challenge. He brought his Korean cuisine set including Korean fried chicken, Kimchi-jjigae, Tteokbokki, and Bibimbap. Chef Art did demonstrate the steps on how to make these dishes. The 10 contestants will have 90 minutes to cook all four dishes, and they will not be working together at once. Meaning, there will be one person cooks and another stays aside the station. They will need to switch places when the 15-minute alarm is up.

- Time: 90 minutes

As a result, Ball and Paope did the best, while Quest and Max are in second. For Ball and Paope, they deserves to be team captains for the next team challenge.

- Winners: Ball and Paope

Pressure Test 4: Baking large-size macarons

In this round, the six contestants will need to create two flavors of macarons, and 12 pieces total.

- Time: 60 minutes (1 hour)
- Bottom three: Pond, Aek and Gino
- Eliminated: Aek

=== Episode 11 ===
- Original airdate: Sunday 21 April 2019

Team Challenge 5: Cook four assigned signature dishes to 50 VIPs

- Location: Tamsui Fisherman's Wharf- Taipei, Taiwan

For this week's team challenge, the nine contestants each receives a flight ticket to Taiwan. The flight is four hours long, and it's the biggest team challenge in Masterchef Thailand's history. Sadly, Chanon cannot fly to Taiwan with the other contestants due to his high fever. This makes him have to compete Pressure Test with the losing team.

For this team challenge, both team captains got to choose their own teammates by playing head and tail coin game to see who goes first. After the game ends, Paope gets to pick her teammates first.

Team captain	Members
Ball	Max, Toei and Pond
Paope	Quest, Lukkate and Gino

Today, both teams will be cooking the hotel's signature dishes including two appetizers and two main dishes, that were demonstrated by Chef A-ji. All dishes have to be like original with their look, taste, and the amount. The contestants will be served the dishes to 50 VIPs by their orders.

- Time: 60 minutes (1 hour) for preparing, and another 60 minutes for serving.

The results was announced on April 28 in Masterchef kitchen.

- Winners: Blue team

=== Episode 12 ===
- Original airdate: Sunday 28 April 2019

Pressure Test 5: Cook a signature dish from Masterchef Thailand Season 2's winner's cookbook

- Special Guest: First, winner of Masterchef Season 2.

Today, there will be a contestant competing with Paope's team, which is Chanon. However, they will be cooking a signature dish from First, which is Deep-fried duck and Khao Soi gel. The dish includes the duck thigh, Khao Soi gel, Shell-shaped pasta, and Acar jelly.

- Time: 60 minutes (1 hour)
- Bottom two: Gino and Chanon
- Eliminated: Gino

Invention Test 6: Main ingredients: 8 types of crabs

In this round, all contestants will be assigning a type of crab to their friends. Starting with Ball, the team captain of winning team, then a person who got assigned a crab by him person will go next. This pattern will go on and on until it reached the last person. There are levels of difficulties for each type.

(By the assigned order)

Contestants	Types of crabs	Difficulty
Quest	Pukatoy (Tiny Crabs)	Hard
Pond	Salted Crabs	Hard
Toei	Japanese Hairy Crab	Medium
Paope	Mongrove Crab	Easy
Lukkate	Soft Shell Crabs	Easy
Max	Flower Crab	Easy
Chanon	Alaska King Crab	Medium
Ball	Japanese Snow Crab	Medium

- Time: 60 minutes (1 hour)

After the taste, Toei did the best, Quest in second.

- Winner: Toei
- Bottom three: Ball, Chanon and Lukkate
- Eliminated: Lukkate

=== Episode 13 ===
- Original airdate: Sunday 12 May 2019

Team Challenge 6: Cook a Thai-cuisine fine-dining dish with a drink for 30 Royal Embassies

- Location: Masterchef Kitchen

There are now 7 contestants remain in the competition. Meaning, there will be a team with more teammates and another less. Since Toei wins first in the previous challenge, she deserves a chance to choose whether have more time or have more teammates than the other team. She decided to have more teammates, meaning Quest's team has less teammates, but more time.

Now it's time to pick teammates, but by playing head or tail coin game like the previous team challenge. Quest deserves a chance whether she would pick head or tail. And she picked head, means that Toei picks tail. As a result, it is tail, so Toei gets to pick first.

Team captain	Members
Toei	Max, Ball and Pond
Quest	Paope and Chanon

For today's challenge, both teams have to cook a fine-dining dish in Thai cuisine for the 30 Royal Embassies of Thailand from 15 different countries around the world. Also, they have to make a drink out of milk that link to the dish they made.

- Time: 90 minutes for red team, 75 minutes for blue team.

As a result, blue team won red team with the score of 22 to 8.

- Winners: Blue team

Pressure Test 6: Beef Wellington

Guest: Gordon Ramsay

In this round, Quest, Paope, and Chanon all faced a challenge from Gordon Ramsay. He had brought us his Beef Wellington that includes tenderloin beef (in medium rare), duxelles, parma ham, and finally wrapped with puff pastry. Plus, the three contestants have to create their own sauce and sides that link to their wellington.

- Time: 60 minutes (1 hour)
- Eliminated: Chanon

=== Episode 14 ===
- Original airdate: Sunday 19 May 2019

Mystery Box Challenge 6: Create a dish using 5 things

For today's last mystery box challenge, all six contestants will have only 5 things to create a fine-dining dish. There are jasmine rice, Short mackerel, small Thai eggplants, 1 egg, and rose. The winner of this round will be the first to qualified to Semi-final of Masterchef Thailand.

- Time: 60 minutes (1 hour)
- Three best dishes: Toei, Pond and Quest
- Winner: Toei

Invention Test 7: Improving your first dish in Masterchef kitchen

In this round, the five contestants have to improve their first dish in Masterchef kitchen that they saw it in the picture that were in front to them. This will show to the judges that they have improved their skills from the past months.

- Time: 60 minutes (1 hour)
- Bottom two: Quest and Ball
- Eliminated: Ball

=== Episode 15: Semi-Final ===
- Original airdate: Sunday 26 May 2019

Invention Test 8: "Back to Basic"

In the first round of Semi-final, the five contestants are creating a creative dish in theme "Back to Basic" . However, they will have up to 10 minutes in Masterchef supermarket to shop their ingredients. But when they entered the supermarket, all they saw are bananas in every type even banana leaves and blossoms. Additionally, the ingredients are limited found in the equipment room.

- Time: 60 minutes (1 hour)
- Bottom two: Quest and Pond
- Eliminated: Pond

Pressure Test 7: Four Royal-Thai snacks

It has come to the last round before the finale, the four contestants receive a challenge from M.L. Kwantip Devakula, one of our judge. She had brought the four royal-Thai snacks including Krathong thong, Cho muang, Moo Sarong, and La tiang. Three people who did the closest will be qualified to the final round of Masterchef Thailand.

- Time: 90 minutes

As a result, Quest did the closest to original, winning the challenge. Toei also did enough to make it to the finals.

- Pressure Test Winner: Quest
- Bottom two: Max and Paope
- Eliminated: Paope
- Advancing to the Finals: Quest, Toei, and Max

=== Episode 16-17: Finale ===
- Original airdate: Sunday 2–9 June 2019

For the final round, Quest, Toei, and Max have to cook their three different courses that they have prepared at home, which are appetizer, main course, and dessert. The contestant needs to make three dishes, one for each judge. They have 60 minutes (1 hour) on each course, and 10 minutes in the supermarket (this includes all three courses). A contestant with the overall best presentation will be crowned as the next Masterchef, with 1,000,000 baht and a personal cookbook.

- Time: 60 minutes (1 hour) for each course.
- Masterchef Thailand Season 3 Winner: Max Nuntawat Chanyalikit
