= MasterChef Thailand season 4 =

MasterChef Thailand
- Season 4

Release
- Original network: Channel 7
- Original release: February 21 – July 11, 2021

Season chronology
- ← Previous; Season 3 Next → Season 5

The fourth season of MasterChef Thailand is the Thai version of the competitive reality TV series MasterChef which premiered on Channel 7 on February 21, 2021. The original presenters have returned, consists of the host Piyathida Mittiraroch, and the judges Pasan Svastivatana, Kwantip Devakula, and Pongtawat Chalermkittichai. Due to the ongoing COVID-19 pandemic, strict rules about social distancing and hygienes are applied throughout the entirety of this season.

This season's grand finale is won by Pornchanan "Lee" Pattanapanyasat, and both Nuttawat "Ter" Kasamvilas and Paniti "Jimmy" Tangsatanan finished as the runner-ups.

== Contestants ==
Top 16

Contestant	Age	Hometown	Occupation	Status	Number of Wins
Pornchanan Pattanapanyasat (Lee)	28	Samut Prakan	Online dessert shop	Winner on July 11	6
Nuttawat Kasamvilas (Ter)	19	Bangkok	Student	Runners-up on July 11	5
Paniti Tangsatanan (Jimmy)	23	Bangkok	Self-employed	Runners-up on July 11	3
Tanaporn Teeranavanich (Gamyui)	28	Phetchaburi	Air hostess	Eliminated on July 4	3
Chatchawan Boonthong (Billy)	27	Kanchanaburi	Self-employed	Eliminated on June 20	5
Pakpong Sangvisase (Beam)	30	Rayong	Veterinarian	Eliminated on June 13	3
Poohrin Pattanawiriyavanich (Pooh)	23	Bangkok	Student	Eliminated on May 23	4
Jidnaray Boonsangwat (Tanwa)	22	Phitsanulok	Student	Eliminated on May 16	0
Patcharamon Charoenchai (Fah)	20	Bangkok	Student	Eliminated on May 16	2
Thanawat Choopraserdchok (Save)	28	Bangkok	Dessert cookery teacher	Eliminated on April 25	2
Anan Rakdee (Aib)	28	Nakhon Si Thammarat	Research assistant	Eliminated on April 18	2
Nutthanun Chutimajirattikorn (Nun)	27	Bangkok	Air hostess	Eliminated on April 11	0
Vechakorn Charoenpanyawut (Sun)	29	Bangkok	Printing business	Eliminated on April 4	0
Thanvalai Lertrattapong (Nat)	24	Songkhla	Unemployed	Eliminated on March 28	0
Pathamaporn Anuwanawong (View)	25	Bangkok	Chinese teacher	Eliminated on March 21	0
Issala Tanadumrongsak (Rean)	27	Bangkok	Unemployed	Eliminated on March 14	0

== Elimination table ==
Place	Contestant	Episode																						
Place	Contestant	4		5		6	7		8	9		10	11		12		13		14		15/16			16/17
1	Lee	IN	IMM	IN	IN	PT	IN	IN	PT	IN	HIGH	WIN	WIN	IMM	WIN	IMM	IN	IN	WIN	IN	WIN	IMM		WINNER
2	Ter	IN	IMM	WIN	IMM	PT	IN	LOW	WIN	IN	IN	PT	IN	IN	IN	IN	WIN	IMM	IN	IN	IN	WIN	IMM	RUNNERS-UP
2	Jimmy	LOW	PT	IN	IN	WIN	HIGH	IN	LOW	IN	WIN	PT	HIGH	LOW	IN	IN	IN	IN	IN	IN	IN	IN	WIN	RUNNERS-UP
4	Gamyui	IN	IMM	HIGH	IN	WIN	IN	HIGH	PT	IN	IN	WIN	HIGH	IN	IN	IN	WIN	IMM	IN	IN	IN	IN	ELIM	
5	Billy	LOW	PT	IN	WIN	WIN	IN	IN	WIN	WIN	IMM	WIN	IN	IN	IN	IN	IN	LOW	IN	ELIM				
6	Beam	IN	IMM	IN	LOW	WIN	IN	IN	WIN	HIGH	IN	WIN	IN	IN	HIGH	IN	IN	ELIM						
7	Pooh	IN	IMM	IN	IN	WIN	IN	IN	WIN	IN	IN	WIN	IN	WIN	HIGH	ELIM								
8	Tanwa	LOW	PT	IN	IMM	LOW	IN	IN	PT	HIGH	LOW	LOW	IN	ELIM										
8	Fah	LOW	PT	IN	IMM	WIN	IN	IN	WIN	IN	IN	LOW	IN	ELIM										
10	Save	IN	IMM	HIGH	IMM	WIN	WIN	IMM	PT	IN	LOW	ELIM												
11	Aib	IN	IMM	IN	IN	LOW	IN	WIN	WIN	IN	ELIM													
12	Nun	IN	IMM	IN	LOW	PT	IN	IN	ELIM															
13	Sun	LOW	PT	IN	IMM	PT	HIGH	ELIM																
14	Nat	IN	IMM	IN	HIGH	ELIM																		
15	View	IN	IMM	IN	ELIM																			
16	Rean	LOW	ELIM																					

(WINNER) This cook won the competition.
(RUNNER-UP) This cook finished in second place.
(WIN) The cook won an individual challenge (Mystery box challenge or Invention Test).
(WIN) The cook was on the winning team in the "Team challenge" and directly advanced to the next round.
(HIGH) The cook was one of the top entries in an individual challenge, but didn't win.
(IN) The cook wasn't selected as a top or bottom entry in an individual challenge.
(IN) The cook wasn't selected as a top or bottom entry in a team challenge.
(IMM) The cook didn't have to compete in that round of the competition and was safe from elimination.
(PT) The cook was on the losing team in the Team challenge and competed in the Pressure test.
(PT) The cook didn't have to compete in the Team challenge but competed in the Pressure test.
(NPT) The cook was on the losing team in the Team challenge, did not compete in the Pressure test, and advanced.
(RET) The cook won the Reinstation Challenge and returned to the competition.
(LOW) The cook was one of the bottom entries in an individual challenge, but wasn't the last person to advance.
(LOW) The cook was one of the bottom entries in an individual challenge, and the last person to advance.
(LOW) The cook was one of the bottom entries in the Team challenge and they were the only person from their team to advance.
(LOW) The cook was one of the bottom entries in the Team challenge, and their team was last to advance.
(ELIM) The cook was eliminated from MasterChef.

== Episodes ==
=== Episode 1 ===
Original airdate: 21 February 2021

Gamyui, Save, Tanwa, and View won their aprons.

=== Episode 2 ===
Original airdate: 28 February 2021

Billy, Pooh, Jimmy, Ter, Sun, Nat, and Rean won their aprons.

=== Episode 3 ===
Original airdate: 7 March 2021

Fah and Nun won their aprons. The judges decided to let 5 contestants to have a second chance at winning the aprons. Aib, Beam, and Lee earn the final places in the Top 16.

=== Episode 4 ===
Original airdate: 14 March 2021

Team Challenge 1: Main ingredient: Whole cow

- Location: The edge of Dong Phaya Yen area.

Groups	Members
1	Gamyui and Pooh
2	Lee and View
3	Nat and Ter
4	Tanwa and Sun
5	Fah and Billy
6	Nun and Aib
7	Save and Beam
8	Rean and Jimmy

- Time: 60 minutes
- Bottom three groups: Fah and Billy (5), Tanwa and Sun (4), Rean and Jimmy (8)

Pressure Test 1: Thai crispy pork with rice, sauce, and soft-boiled egg

- Time: 45 minutes
- Eliminated: Rean

=== Episode 5 ===
Original airdate: 21 March 2021 Mystery Box Challenge 1: Main ingredient: Rare International Ingredients

- Time: 60 minutes (1 hour)
- Three best dishes: Gamyui, Ter and Save
- Winner: Ter

As winner of the Mystery Box Challenge, Ter is safe and get to save 4 contestants for elimination. He chose Save, Tanwa, Sun, and Fah.

Invention Test 1: Main dishes: Chickpea Samosa and/or Chickpea Ravioli

- Saved: Ter, Save, Tanwa, Sun, and Fah
- Time: 60 minutes (1 hour)
- Bottom three: Nun, View and Beam
- Eliminated: View

=== Episode 6 ===
Original airdate: 28 March 2021 Team Challenge 2:

Team captain	Members
Nat	Ter, Aib, Lee, Sun, Tanwa, and Nun
Billy	Beam, Jimmy, Pooh, Fah, Gamyui, and Save

Both teams need to make and serve pies each in 1 hour.

The blue team won by serving 100 pies before the service time was over.

- Winners: Blue Team

Pressure Test 2: Tomahawk steak with biscuits and gravy

- Time: 60 minutes
- Bottom three: Aib, Nat, and Tanwa
- Eliminated: Nat

=== Episode 7 ===
Original airdate: 4 April 2021

Mystery Box Challenge 2: The contestants must make a desert with high quality ingredients such as, honey, young coconut, cinnamon, ginger and paprika.

- Time: 60 minutes (1 hour)
- Three best dishes: Save, Sun, and Jimmy
- Winner: Save

As winner of the Mystery Box Challenge, Save is safe.

Skills Test 1: The contestants must carve a whole salmon as close to perfection according to Chef Ian's demo.

- Time: 30 minutes

Aib and Gamyui won the Skills Test but Gamyui carve the salmon close to perfection.

- Winners: Aib and Gamyui
- Bottom 2: Ter and Sun
- Eliminated: Sun

=== Episode 8 ===
Original airdate: 11 April 2021 Team Challenge 3:

Team captain	Members
Aib	Pooh, Beam, Fah, Billy and Ter
Gamyui	Save, Lee, Jimmy, Nun, and Tanwa

Both teams need to make and serve a Tom Yum Sea 2 hours in cooking and 1 hour in serving.

The red team won by a score of 75 to the blue team's 25.

- Winners: Red Team

Pressure Test 2: Chocolate lava cake with green tea ice cream and crumbling almonds

- Time: 40 minutes
- Bottom 2: Jimmy and Nun
- Eliminated: Nun

=== Episode 9 ===
Original airdate: 18 April 2021

Mystery Box Challenge 3: Main Ingredient: Native Lethocerus Indicus

- Time: 60 min. (1 hour)
- Three best dishes: Beam, Tanwa and Billy
- Winner: Billy

Invention Test 2: Main ingredients, each box in different amount

For this week's invention test, there are three boxes. Each box has different amount of main ingredients. There are three boxes of ingredients including:

-Box 1: Lamb Ribs

-Box 2: Lamb Ribs, Bananas and Pickled Fish

-Box 3: Lamb Ribs, Bananas, Pickled Fish, Yellow Plum, Mackerel, Giant Catfish Spawn and Chocolate

Since Billy was the winner of the Mystery Box Challenge, he gets to choose a box for each contestants.

Box #	Contestants
#1 (1 ingredient)	Gamyui, Lee and Fah
#2 (3 ingredients)	Pooh, Ter and Beam
#3 (7 ingredients)	Tanwa, Aib, Save and Jimmy

- Time: 60 min. (1 hour)

After the judges have tasted all ten dishes, Jimmy did the best, Lee in second. Both of them will be placed as team captains for next week.

- Winner: Jimmy
- Bottom three: Tanwa, Aib and Save
- Eliminated: Aib

=== Episode 10 ===
Original airdate: 25 April 2021 Team Challenge 4:

Team captain	Members
Jimmy	Save, Ter, Tanwa, and Fah
Lee	Billy, Beam, Pooh, and Gamyui

Both teams need to prepare appetizers, soup, main course, and dessert and serve in Chinese tables theme at the wedding of Ball, a contestant from MasterChef Thailand Season 3, for 160 guests in 3 hours. Also in each course need to serve every 15 minutes.

The blue team won by a score of 94 to the red team's 86.

- Winners: Blue Team

Pressure Test 3: Egg Benedict with only 5 eggs

- Time: 25 minutes
- Bottom 3: Save, Fah and Tanwa
- Eliminated: Save

=== Episode 11 ===
Original airdate: 16 May 2021

Mystery Box Challenge 4: The contestants must make a dish with high quality ingredients such as, otoro fish, wagyu beef, fogras, taraba crab legs, truffles, Japanese bunching onions, asparaguses, strawberries, corns, gold leafs and caviar.

- Time: 30 minutes
- Challenge Winners: Lee, Jimmy and Gamyui
- Winner: Lee

As winner of the Mystery Box Challenge, Lee is safe.

Invention Test 3: Since Lee got privilege to control the invention test. Lee got safe and can choose main ingredient to other contestants. Which the main ingredients are in group of "low quality ingredients" which are pork liver, pork stomach and pork lungs. Lee choose pork liver to Fah and Gamyui. Choose pork stomach to Billy, Beam and Pooh. Choose pork lungs to Jimmy, Ter and Tanwa.

- Time: 60 minutes
- Winner: Pooh
- Bottom Three: Jimmy, Fah, Tanwa
- Eliminated: Fah, Tanwa
