= MasterChef Thailand season 6 =

Season of reality television series

MasterChef Thailand
- Season 6
- No. of episodes: 17

Release
- Original network: Channel 7
- Original release: June 11 – October 8, 2023

Season chronology
- ← Previous; Season 5 Next → Season 7

MasterChef Thailand season 6 is the sixth season of MasterChef Thailand, the Thai version of the competitive reality TV series MasterChef. The show premiered on Channel 7 on June 11, 2023. Pasan Svastivatana, Kwantip Devakula and Pongtawat Chalermkittichai all returned as judges in this season. Piyathida Mittiraroch also returned as the host. This season is a twist from the original MasterChef, and it will focus on only traditional Thai cuisine rather than going worldwide.

Applications for contestants of the sixth season opened on February 28, 2023 until April 7, 2023 with same requirements as Season 5, where auditionees must not have more than 3 months worth of cookery education (courses in individual dishes are still allowed).

This season is won by Valasura "Zetrong" Na Lampang against Araya "Gig" Siri and Wasurat "Satang" Kaewwichit, who finished as the runner-ups.

== Contestants ==
Top 17

Contestant	Age	Hometown	Occupation	Status
Valasura Na Lampang (Zetrong)	36	Bangkok	Legal advisor	Winner on October 8
Araya Siri (Gig)	34	Chiang Mai	Government officer	Runner-Up on October 8
Wasurat Kaewwichit (Satang) (Note: Competed in Junior Season 1)	18	Bangkok	Student	Runner-Up on October 8
Natthaphon Prathumsrisakorn (Heng)	30	Samut Sakhon	Lecturer	Eliminated on October 1
Pinsuda Sungthong (Bell)	29	Bangkok	Business owner	Eliminated on October 1
Thamanawan Setapura (Kabmooh)	27	Bangkok	Business owner	Eliminated on October 1
Titthipong Sriwilai (Aue)	32	Phetchabun	Influencer	Eliminated on September 10
Pornwipa Naksakul (Moh)	33	Nonthaburi	Art teacher	Eliminated on September 3
Natchapol Prakobna (Giant)	29	Sakon Nakhon	Pad Thai seller	Eliminated on August 27
Ronnakorn Hengsakulwat (Q)	27	Bangkok	Employee	Eliminated on August 27
Hussani Aadman (Rita)	21	Yara	Student	Eliminated on August 13
Waipop Yodsawaeng (Pob)	25	Bangkok	Online food delivery driver	Eliminated on August 6
Kobkrit Kasetsart (Toy)	59	Prachin Buri	Farmer	Eliminated on July 30
Awirut Meksuwan (Bomb)	34	Bangkok	Steward	Eliminated on July 23
Prichayaon Junkajorn (Plabpluem)	19	Samut Sakhon	Student	Eliminated on July 16
Nawarat Suwannasin (Ploy)	20	Bangkok	Student	Eliminated on July 9
Laiat Krongthong (Eat)	71	Nonthaburi	Business owner	Eliminated on June 25

== Elimination table ==
Place	Contestant	Episode																							
Place	Contestant	3	4		5	6		7	8		9		10	10/11	11	12		13		14		15-16			16-17
1	Zetrong	WIN	HIGH	WIN	PT	HIGH	IN	LOW	WIN	IMM	WIN	IMM	IN	WIN	IN	IN	WIN	HIGH	IN	WIN	PT	WIN	IMM		WINNER
2	Gig	LOW	IN	HIGH	WIN	IN	WIN	WIN	HIGH	HIGH	HIGH	IN	IN	WIN	LOW	HIGH	PT	IN	LOW	IN	WIN	IN	WIN	IMM	RUNNERS-UP
2	Satang	IN	IN	IMM	WIN	HIGH	IN	PT	IN	PT	HIGH	IN	IN	WIN	IN	IN	PT	WIN	IN	IN	LOW	IN	HIGH	WIN	RUNNERS-UP
4	Heng	HIGH	IN	IMM	PT	IN	IN	WIN	HIGH	LOW	IN	LOW	WIN	WIN	IN	IN	LOW	IN	IN	HIGH	LOW	IN	IN	ELIM	
4	Bell	IN	IN	IN	PT	IN	IN	WIN	IN	PT	IN	WIN	IN	LOW	IN	WIN	IMM	IN	LOW	IN	LOW	HIGH	IN	ELIM	
4	Kabmooh	IN	IN	LOW	WIN	IN	IN	PT	IN	PT	IN	LOW	HIGH	WIN	IN	IN	LOW	IN	WIN	HIGH	PT	IN	IN	ELIM	
7	Aue	HIGH	IN	IMM	WIN	WIN	IMM	WIN	IN	HIGH	IN	IN	HIGH	PT	LOW	HIGH	PT	HIGH	ELIM						
8	Moh	IN	IN	IN	WIN	IN	LOW	WIN	IN	PT	IN	IN	IN	PT	WIN	IN	ELIM								
9	Giant	IN	IN	IN	PT	IN	IN	LOW	IN	LOW	IN	IN	IN	WIN	ELIM										
10	Q	IN	IN	IMM	LOW	IN	IN	WIN	IN	HIGH	IN	IN	IN	ELIM											
11	Rita	LOW	HIGH	IMM	WIN	IN	IN	PT	IN	PT	IN	ELIM													
12	Pob	IN	IN	IN	WIN	IN	IN	WIN	IN	ELIM															
13	Toy	IN	IN	IN	PT	IN	LOW	ELIM																	
14	Bomb	IN	WIN	IMM	WIN	IN	ELIM																		
15	Plabpluem	IN	IN	LOW	ELIM																				
16	Ploy	IN	IN	ELIM																					
17	Eat	ELIM																							

(WINNER) This cook won the competition.
(RUNNER-UP) This cook finished in second place.
(WIN) The cook won an individual challenge (Mystery box challenge or Invention Test).
(WIN) The cook was on the winning team in the "Team challenge" and directly advanced to the next round.
(HIGH) The cook was one of the top entries in an individual challenge, but didn't win.
(IN) The cook wasn't selected as a top or bottom entry in an individual challenge.
(IN) The cook wasn't selected as a top or bottom entry in a team challenge.
(IMM) The cook didn't have to compete in that round of the competition and was safe from elimination.
(PT) The cook was on the losing team in the Team challenge and competed in the Pressure test.
(PT) The cook didn't have to compete in the Team challenge but competed in the Pressure test.
(NPT) The cook was on the losing team in the Team challenge, did not compete in the Pressure test, and advanced.
(LOW) The cook was one of the bottom entries in an individual challenge, but wasn't the last person to advance.
(LOW) The cook was one of the bottom entries in an individual challenge, and the last person to advance.
(ELIM) The cook was eliminated from MasterChef.

== Episodes ==
=== Episode 1-3: Qualifying Rounds ===
- Original airdates: 11, 18, & 25 July 2023

30 contestants started the competition, but only 5 will win the apron on the first round. The challenge in this round is to make one type of chili paste and serve it with blanched vegetables. In the first round, Eat, Zetrong, Rita, Bomb, & Gig won their aprons.

The remaining 25 contestants must compete in this round in a giant mystery box containing two items: a clay pot and a brazier. The challenge in the competition is curry served with rice cooked in a clay pot. In this round, only 4 will win the aprons. Giant, Q, Plabpluem, & Toy all won their aprons.

Because Yin Yin withdrew on the last round, 20 contestants remain. Using a pan, the contestants need to make a fried Thai food. In this round, only 3 will win the aprons. Bell, Heng, & Satang all won their aprons.

In the fourth & final round, the remaining 17 contestants are challenged to create Thai ingredients into a master chef level menu with the main ingredients, local fish. The types of fishes include catfish, snakehead fish, tilapia and pangasius. In this round, only 2 will win the last aprons. Ploy & Aue won their aprons.

After the last round, the judges decided to give 3 more aprons. They chose Kabmooh, Moh, & Pob.

=== Episode 3 ===
- Original airdate: 25 July 2023

Elimination challenge: Thai Samrap

Original dish: The panaeng curry should have a beautiful, oily taste, the curry paste's texture should be soft, and all the elements go together.

- Three best dishes: Zetrong, Heng, & Aue
- Time: 60 minutes
- Three best dishes: Zetrong, Heng, & Aue
- Winner: Zetrong
- Bottom three: Rita, Gig, & Eat
- Eliminated: Eat
