= MasterChef Thailand season 5 =

MasterChef Thailand
- Season 5

Release
- Original network: Channel 7
- Original release: February 13 – June 19, 2022

Season chronology
- ← Previous; Season 4 Next → Season 6

MasterChef Thailand (season 5) is the fifth season of the Thai version of the competitive reality TV series MasterChef. The show premiered on Channel 7 on February 13, 2022. Pasan Svastivatana, Kwantip Devakula and Pongtawat Chalermkittichai all returned as judges in this season. Piyathida Mittiraroch also returned as the host. Applications for contestants of the fifth season were opened on October 6, 2021, ending at October 31, 2021, with one of the additional requirements being that auditionees must not have more than 3 months worth of cookery education (courses in individual dishes are still allowed).

Due to the COVID-19 pandemic that still plays a role, strict rules about hygienes is necessary, and contestants are set to quarantine if they are not feeling well. Upon returning after quarantine, those contestants will have to face a challenge of that week to win themselves back to the competition.

With 27 official contestants, this season brings in the largest cast in MasterChef Thailand history. Angkrit Chuer-am wins this season's grand finale, followed by Chanidapa "Maam" Pornpinit in second, and Brad Chuesomtrong in third place.

== Contestants ==
Top 27

Contestant	Age	Hometown	Occupation	Status
Angkrit Chuer-am	42	Samutprakarn	Unemployed	Winner on June 19
Chanidapa Pornpinit (Maam)	26	Bangkok	Company employee	Runner-up on June 19
Brad Chuesomtrong	42	Bangkok	Architectural designer	Third Place on June 19
Yupadee Sattarujawong (Yup)	59	Bangkok	Housewife and Photographer	Fourth Place on June 19
Prasert Tongborisut (Dang)	59	Chaiyaphum	Government teacher	Eliminated on June 5
Jirayu Jessadakornchai (Jake)	32	Phrae	Unemployed	Eliminated on June 5
Pimthip Paosila (Belle)	30	Nonthaburi	Company employee	Eliminated on May 29
Jumroen Suthamgosal (Roen)	47	Bangkok	Engineer	Eliminated on May 29
Anuwat Watmuang (Nu)	28	Bangkok	Unemployed	Eliminated on May 15
Michel Gentili	35	Nonthaburi	Company employee	Eliminated on May 15
Varot Pinpat (Mai Zung)	39	Nonthaburi	Services development consultant	Eliminated on May 15
Tatsini Kiattikhunphan (Tas)	24	Bangkok	Investor	Eliminated on May 15
Thofan Mackay (Holly)	19	Udonthani	Student	Eliminated on May 15
Sittiporn Suwannarat (Nhong)	34	Rayong	Farmer	Eliminated on April 24
Pongsuwan Rattanasuwan (Tueng)	61	Bangkok	Music producer	Eliminated on April 17
Sarun Asawanuchit (Arth)	35	Bangkok	Marketing manager	Eliminated on April 10
Supanard Temrat (Kaowtip)	19	Bangkok	Student	Eliminated on April 10
Suravadee Meesaengpraw (Nant)	49	Bangkok	Self-employed	Eliminated on April 10
Alisa Thosamrit (Yok)	27	Lopburi	Housekeeper	Eliminated on April 3
Sophon Poomrattanawong (Ten)	34	Lopburi	Salon owner	Eliminated on April 3
Surachet Chuaytaen (Moo)	34	Phatthalung	Music teacher	Eliminated on April 3
Thepnimit Preechayan (Kwan)	36	Buriram	Baker	Eliminated on March 20
Trinnapong Junlaphan (Oat)	38	Loei	Merchant	Eliminated on March 13
Tawichoke Channarong (Ton)	31	Bangkok	Self-employed	Eliminated on March 6
Pailin Jangprajak (Medploy)	25	Chanthaburi	Online video jockey	Eliminated on February 27
Sumet Wirotchaiyan (Aim)	47	Bangkok	Unemployed	Eliminated on February 27
Thaenpon Lertritdecha (Joe)	25	Mukdahan	Construction supplies shop owner	Eliminated on February 27

== Elimination table ==
Place	Contestant	Episode																						
Place	Contestant	3	4		5		6/7		7			8	9	10	11		12	13		14/15	15	16		17/18
1	Angkrit	HIGH	IN	IN	QRT							IN	IN	IN	IN	WIN	WIN	IMM	IN	WIN	IN	WIN	IMM	WINNER
2	Maam	QRT										IN	IN	IN	IN	HIGH	WIN	IMM	IN	WIN	IN	IN	WIN	RUNNER-UP
3	Brad	HIGH	IN	IN	HIGH	IN	WIN	IMM	IN	IN	WIN	IMM	LOW	IN	HIGH	IN	QRT	PT	IN	PT	IN	IN	WIN	FINALIST
4	Yup	IN	HIGH	IMM	HIGH	IN	WIN	IMM	IN	IN	IN	LOW	IN	IN	WIN	IN	QRT	IMM	HIGH	PT	LOW	IN	LOW	FINALIST
5	Dang	IN	IN	IMM	IN	IN	IN	IN	WIN	IMM	IMM	IMM	IN	LOW	IN	IN	IN	IMM	WIN	WIN	IN	IN	ELIM	
5	Jake	QRT										IN	IN	WIN	IN	IN	WIN	IMM	IN	WIN	IN	IN	ELIM	
7	Belle	IN	IN	IN	IN	IN	IN	WIN	IN	IN	IN	LOW	LOW	IN	HIGH	IN	IN	IMM	IN	PT	ELIM			
8	Roen	QRT										LOW	WIN	WIN	LOW	IN	WIN	IMM	IN	ELIM				
9	Mai Zung	IN	IN	IN	WIN	IMM	WIN	IMM	IN	IN	WIN	IMM	IN	WIN	IN	IN	WIN	IMM	ELIM					
9	Michel	IN	IN	IN	IN	IMM	WIN	IMM	IN	WIN	IMM	IMM	IN	WIN	IN	IN	LOW	PT	ELIM					
9	Nu	WIN	IN	LOW	IN	IMM	IN	LOW	IN	IN	IN	IN	IN	WIN	IN	HIGH	IN	IMM	ELIM					
12	Holly	IN	IN	IMM	IN	IMM	WIN	IMM	IN	WIN	IMM	IMM	IN	QRT				ELIM						
12	Tas	LOW	IN	IMM	IN	IN	WIN	IMM	WIN	IMM	IMM	IMM	IN	IN	LOW	IN	LOW	ELIM						
14	Nhong	IN	IN	IN	IN	LOW	IN	IN	IN	IN	WIN	IMM	HIGH	LOW	ELIM									
15	Tueng	IN	HIGH	IMM	IN	IN	WIN	IMM	WIN	IMM	IMM	IMM	IN	ELIM										
16	Arth	IN	IN	IN	IN	IN	IN	IN	IN	IN	IN	IN	ELIM											
16	Kaowtip	IN	IN	IMM	IN	IMM	WIN	IMM	IN	IN	IN	IN	ELIM											
16	Nant	IN	IN	IMM	IN	IN	IN	IN	IN	WIN	IMM	IMM	ELIM											
19	Moo	QRT										ELIM												
19	Ten	QRT										ELIM												
19	Yok	IN	IN	LOW	IN	IN	IN	WIN	IN	IN	IN	ELIM												
22	Kwan	LOW	IN	LOW	IN	IMM	IN	ELIM																
23	Oat	LOW	WIN	IMM	IN	ELIM																		
24	Ton	LOW	IN	ELIM																				
25	Aim	ELIM																						
25	Joe	ELIM																						
25	Medploy	ELIM																						

(WINNER) This cook won the competition.
(RUNNER-UP) This cook finished in second place.
(WIN) The cook won an individual challenge (Mystery box challenge / Invention Test / Skills Test or Elimination Test)
(WIN) The cook was on the winning in the Between two persons challenge.
(WIN) The cook was on the winning team in the "Team challenge" and directly advanced to the next round.
(HIGH) The cook was one of the top entries in an individual challenge, but didn't win.
(IN) The cook wasn't selected as a top or bottom entry in an individual challenge.
(IN) The cook wasn't selected as a top or bottom entry in a team challenge.
(IMM) The cook didn't have to compete in that round of the competition and was safe from elimination.
(IMM) The cook didn't have to compete in that round of the competition and was safe from elimination with Golden apron.
(PT) The cook was on the losing team in the Team challenge and competed in the Pressure test.
(PT) The cook didn't have to compete in the Team challenge but competed in the Pressure test.
(NPT) The cook was on the losing team in the Team challenge, did not compete in the Pressure test, and advanced.
(RET) The cook won the Reinstation Challenge and returned to the competition.
(LOW) The cook was one of the bottom entries in an individual challenge, but wasn't the last person to advance.
(LOW) The cook was one of the bottom entries in an individual challenge, and the last person to advance.
(LOW) The cook was one of the bottom entries in the Team challenge and they were the only person from their team to advance.
(LOW) The cook was one of the bottom entries in the Team challenge, and their team was last to advance.
(QRT) The cook was quarantined due to them being in the risk group of getting COVID-19.
(ELIM) The cook was eliminated from MasterChef.

== Episodes ==
No.	Title	Original release date	Thai viewers (millions)
1	"Auditions"	February 13, 2022	2.438
Sixty successful home cooks arrived at the MasterChef Audition Stadium, loosely built based on the Netflix show, Squid Game. The home cooks were informed that if their aprons are snatched, their journey of receiving a white apron would be over.: Auditions Round 1 - Skills Test: The home cooks each have to cook 24 successful fried egg dishes, out of 25 eggs given, in 15 minutes. The egg yolk must stay in its original shape at all times and the egg white must be cooked. They are allowed only one mistake. At any point during the round, the home cooks may be asked to stop cooking for judges' inspection.; Thirty out of sixty home cooks advanced to the next round. Before the second round, the remaining home cooks were asked to pick a coloured station (red, yellow and green), each with a corresponding dish that they have to make.: Auditions Round 2 - Skills Test: The home cooks have to make 250 grams worth of chili paste, corresponding to their station colour (red being Chuci curry, yellow being yellow curry and green being green curry) in 30 minutes. They would also have 5 minutes to select their ingredients to make their chilli paste, in which no conferring is allowed. If there's any incorrect ingredients chosen, the home cook would instantly be eliminated.; Twelve out of thirty home cooks (Angkrit, Arth, Dang, Jake, Joe, Kaowtip, Maam, Medploy, Moo, Roen, Ten, and Tueng) passed the auditions and got their white aprons.
2	"Second Chance Auditions (Part 1)"	February 20, 2022	2.568
Twenty-four out of the forty-eight already-eliminated home cooks were invited back for another chance to win the white apron.: Second Chance Auditions Round 1 - Team Challenge: The home cooks have to separate themselves into two teams: pink and light blue. Each team must cook a main dish and a dessert for each of the 50 food critics in 2 hours and 30 minutes, in which the main dishes must be done in 2 hours and the desserts in the last 30 minutes. Any dishes or desserts that are not done on time are not served. Each team is also given rib-eye angus steaks and horse crabs for the main dish and sugar canes for the dessert.; The teams for the team challenge were as follows: Pink: Aim, Mai Zung, Yok, Nant, Michel, Pookhao, Tas, Ton, Ann, Fonliu, Holly, Nu; Light Blue: Nhong, Yup, Kwan, Beer, Brad, Oak, Kim Jae, Belle, Namcha, Yoo, Boyd, Moh; During the challenge, Nhong was switched with Brad as the team captain after numerous mistakes involving his role. After the first 2 hours, the light blue team did not complete 10 main dishes, while the pink team did not complete 16 dishes, meaning that those dishes are not served. The pink team won the challenge with a 29-21 score. Despite pink team's win, due to their mediocre performance and criticism from the food critics, there were only 7 white aprons available to them. They decided that Holly, Mai Zung, Michel, Nu, Tas, Ton, and Yok would receive the aprons. The episode left on a cliffhanger, with the remaining five members from the pink team and all of the light blue team members given their last chance to win the white apron.
3	"Second Chance Auditions (Part 2) and Black Box Challenge"	February 27, 2022	2.728
The light blue team, who lost the previous team challenge from the last episode joined the five unselected pink team members for their last chance to win the white apron.: Second Chance Auditions Round 2 - Invention Test: The seventeen home cooks would need to create a dish, using river snails as the main ingredient. They are given 60 minutes to complete this challenge.; Out of the seventeen home cooks, only eight were able to win their white aprons, including, Brad, Aim, Belle, Kwan, Naan, Nhong, Oat and Yup. Two weeks later, the contestants entered the MasterChef Kitchen for the first time. However, only twenty-two of them were present, as five of the contestants, Jake, Maam, Moo, Roen and Ten, have to be isolated due to them being in the risk group of getting COVID-19 as a precaution. As a result, those five people are automatically eliminated and will not move on to the next round.: Black Box Challenge: The contestants would have to create a dish with black-coloured ingredients: black chicken, century egg, grass jelly, brown rice, truffle, black olives, shiitake, seaweed, squid ink and dark chocolate. They have 60 minutes to complete this challenge. This mystery box challenge is later revealed to be a black box challenge, meaning that five people will be eliminated in this round.; After the time is up, the judges determined the 7 people whose dishes were not up to standard. They were Aim, Joe, Kwan, Medploy, Oat, Tas, and Ton. Angkrit, Brad, and Nu were deemed as the top three dishes. Nu won the overall challenge. With Nu being the winner of the black box challenge, he is eligible to save 2 people out of the seven people whose dishes are the worst. He chose Kwan and Ton, despite the fact that those two dishes contain a raw component. Judges later decided that only three people would be eliminated from this challenge. They were Aim, Joe and Medploy.
4	"The Homegrown Mystery Box Challenge"	February 27, 2022	N/A
Before the challenge was officially announced, the judges introduced Chef Tukta, a chef in The Next Iron Chef Thailand chef, who was a home cook at the beginning of her cooking career. She is the owner of Krua Baan Yee Sarn (Yeesarn Kitchen), a restaurant with dishes from Thai original cuisine.: Mystery Box Challenge: The top nineteen contestants would have to create a dish using any of the following homegrown ingredients: river prawns, climbing perches, hibiscus leaves, lvy gourds, puffball mushrooms, rat-tailed radishes, moringas, madans, mauks, star apples, coconut shoots, and sagos. They have 60 minutes to complete this challenge.; Oat was declared as the winner of this challenge, with Tueng and Yup being the runners-up. Oat was given immunity from the next invention test as well as an ability to choose eight other people to join him. He chose Dang, Holly, Kaowtip, Nant, Tas, Tueng, and Yup.: Invention Test: The rest eleven contestants would have to create a dish with beef hearts as the main ingredient. They are given 60 minutes to complete this challenge, with an additional 5 minutes in the MasterChef Supermarket.; Kwan, Nu, Yok and Ton were named as four of the worst dishes in this challenge. Nu and Yok were saved as their dishes are deemed innovative and creative by the judges, but lack taste and embrace of the main ingredient. Ton was eliminated from this challenge.
