= Yellow plum =

Yellow plum may refer to:

- Mirabelle plum, a yellow variety of plum associated with Lorraine in France
- Ximenia americana, a small sprawling tree of woodlands native to Australia and Asia whose fruits are sometimes called yellow plums
