= MasterChef Junior Thailand =

- Genre: Cookery
- Directed by: Kitikorn Penrote (2018)
- Presented by: Piyathida Mittiraroch
- Judges: Current: M.L. Pasan Sawasdiwat; M.L. Kwantip Devakul; Pongtawat Chalermkittichai; Past: Patiparn Pataweekarn; Ban Boribun; Chatchaya Ruktakaniti
- Country of origin: Thailand
- Original language: Thai
- No. of seasons: 2
- No. of episodes: 15 (2018)

Production
- Running time: 90 minutes
- Production company: Heliconia H GROUP (2018-present)

Original release
- Network: Channel 7 HD (2018-present)
- Release: 3 February 2018 – present

MasterChef Junior Thailand is a Thai competitive cooking game show that premiered in 2018.

In 2018, MasterChef Junior Thailand was brought by Channel 7. The audition for new contestants was opened in 2018.

== MasterChef Junior Thailand ==
For the 2018 series, revival remains similar to the adult version of MasterChef Thailand. However, there are multiple contestants eliminated per week, instead of just one.

== Seasons ==
Season	Premiere date	Finale date	No. of Finalists	Winner	Runner(s)-up	Judge 1	Judge 2	Judge 3
1	19 August 2018	9 December 2018	26	Chananchida Pongphet	Sirisak Mathong & Pawarit Parnichprapai	Kwantip Devakula	Pasan Sawasdiwat	Pongtawat Chalermkittichai
2	22 September 2019	22 December 2019	28	Parima Sinhaphalin	Kheetakarn Pongsak & Veerawin Lertbunnapong	Kwantip Devakula	Pasan Sawasdiwat	Pongtawat Chalermkittichai
3	2 June 2024	8 September 2024	25	Ektrakarn Cheowpatthayakorn & Kanapakorn Aphibunampai	Natthapisit Lertmukda & Sukontha Watcharaphin	Kwantip Devakula	Pasan Sawasdiwat	Pongtawat Chalermkittichai

== Season synopsis ==
=== Channel 7 HD version ===
==== Season 1 ====
The auditions for the first season of the revival series were opened in 2018. The age limit for the contestants was increased from 12 to 13 years old.

== See also ==
- MasterChef Thailand
