= MasterChef Thailand Celebrity season 2 =

MasterChef Thailand Celebrity
- Season 2
- No. of episodes: 11

Release
- Original network: Channel 7
- Original release: 3 October – 26 December 2021

Season chronology
- ← Previous; Season 1 Next → Season 3

MasterChef Celebrity Thailand is the Thai version of the competitive reality TV series MasterChef which premiered on Channel 7 on 3 October 2021.

== Celebrities ==
Contestant	Age	Hometown	Group	Status	Number of Wins
Unnop Thongborisut (Por)	28	Uttaradit	A	Winner on 26 December	5
Passakorn Ponlaboon (Fern)	32	Ratchaburi	B	Runner-ups on 26 December	2
Shawankorn Wanthanapisitkul (Kratip)	33	Songkhla	B	Runner-ups on 26 December	3
Thanwa Suriyajak	30	Pakse, Laos	A	Eliminated on 19 December	1
Teeradon Supapunpinyo (JamyJamess)	24	Bangkok	B	Eliminated on 28 November	0
Nichaphat Chatchaipholrat (Pearwah)	26	Khonkaen	B	Eliminated on 21 November	2
Popetorn Soonthornyanakij (Two)	41	Bangkok	B	Eliminated on 14 November	0
Anyarin Terathananpat (Tubtim)	31	Bangkok	B	Eliminated on 7 November	0
Tanatat Chaiyaat (Kangsom)	29	Bangkok	A	Eliminated on 31 October	0
Nalin Hohler (Sara)	35	Chiang Mai	A	Eliminated on 24 October	0
Sireeporn Yoogthatat (Aerin)	32	Bangkok	A	Eliminated on 17 October	0
Carissa Springett	23	Chon Buri	A	Eliminated on 3 October	0

== Elimination table ==
Place	Contestant	Episode																			
Place	Contestant	1		2		3		4		5		6		7		8		9/10			10/11
1	Por	WIN	IN	WIN	PT	IN	IN	WIN	PT	Pass								HIGH	WIN	IMM	WINNER
2	Fern									IN	LOW	WIN	IN	IN	IN	IN	PT	WIN	IMM		RUNNER-UPS
2	Kratip									WIN	IN	HIGH	IN	IN	LOW	WIN	PT	IN	IN	WIN	RUNNER-UPS
4	Thanwa	HIGH	LOW	HIGH	PT	WIN	IN	IN	PT	Pass								IN	IN	ELIM	
5	JamyJamess									IN	IN	IN	LOW	IN	IN	IN	ELIM				
5	Kangsom	IN	IN	IN	PT	IN	IN	IN	ELIM												
7	Pearwah									WIN	IN	HIGH	IN	WIN	ELIM						
7	Sara	IN	IN	IN	PT	IN	ELIM														
9	Two									IN	IN	IN	ELIM								
9	Aerin	HIGH	IN	HIGH	ELIM																
11	Tubtim									IN	ELIM										
11	Carissa	IN	ELIM																		
