= MasterChef Junior Thailand season 1 =

MasterChef Junior Thailand
- Season 1
- No. of episodes: 16

Release
- Original network: Channel 7
- Original release: 19 August – 9 December 2018

Season chronology
- Next → Season 2

The first season of MasterChef Junior Thailand, began on 19 August 2018 and aired on Channel 7. Judges by M.L. Pasan Sawasdiwat, M.L. Kwantip Devakula and Pongtawat Chalermkittichai. Program presented by Piyathida Mittiraroch.

== Contestants ==
Contestant	Age	Hometown	Status	Number of Wins
Chananchida Pongphet (Pattie)	10	Bangkok	Winner on 9 December	8
Pawarit Parnichprapai (Mark)	12	Bangkok	Runners-up on 9 December	4
Sirisak Mathong (Chef)	11	Bangkok	Runners-up on 9 December	6
Jasmin Engchuan	12	Bangkok	Eliminated on 18 November	3
Phurin Chatchalermchai (Zen)	13	Samut Prakan	Eliminated on 18 November	3
Iyarin Pongthanakit (I-Rin)	9	Phitsanulok	Eliminated on 18 November	4
Prima Uthai (Peach)	11	Bangkok	Eliminated on 11 November	3
Nayada Fujitnirun (Gorya)	9	Bangkok	Eliminated on 11 November	1
Porjai Sottitad	8	Bangkok	Eliminated on 4 November	3
Achirapol Jinapanyo (Achi)	10	Chiang Mai	Eliminated on 4 November	3
Nattasan Siripitakul (Boom)	11	Nonthaburi	Eliminated on 28 October	3
Sarida Saphankaew (Namsai)	10	Prachuap Khiri Khan	Eliminated on 28 October	1
Natcha Kosinghavattana (Chacha)	10	Bangkok	Eliminated on 21 October	1
Chayut Owatsakul (Poom)	11	Chiang Mai	Eliminated on 21 October	4
Alice Carlow	11	Chonburi	Eliminated on 14 October	1
Kanyanit Pongjirathanet (Rita)	12	Bangkok	Eliminated on 14 October	1
Kanakrit Wongcharoen (Captain)	12	Pathum Thani	Eliminated on 7 October	2
Wasurat Kaewwichit (Satung)	12	Bangkok	Eliminated on 7 October	1
Siridon Rangseehirunrat (Tan)	12	Bangkok	Eliminated on 30 September	2
Kongngern Charnvises (KC)	8	Bangkok	Withdrew on 30 September	2
Passakorn Chaithep (C-Nine)	8	Samut Prakan	Eliminated on 23 September	0
Melada Phatthanapong (Mel)	9	Bangkok	Eliminated on 23 September	1
Baiboon Khwanwongkrajang (En Doo)	9	Bangkok	Eliminated on 16 September	1
Cherika Laor (Praew)	8	Bangkok	Eliminated on 16 September	1
Arakorn Chiwasantikan (Nano)	11	Bangkok	Eliminated on 2 September	0
Raphael Rafort	11	Phuket	Eliminated on 2 September	0

== Elimination table ==
Place	Contestant	Episode																					
Place	Contestant	3		4		5	6		7	8		9		10		11	12		13		14		16
1	Pattie	IN	IMM	IN	WIN	WIN	IN	IMM	PT	HIGH	IN	WIN	IMM	HIGH	IN	WIN	IN	WIN	IN	WIN	IMM	WIN	WINNER
2	Chef	IN	LOW	WIN	IMM	WIN	WIN	IMM	PT	HIGH	IN	IN	IN	IN	WIN	WIN	WIN	IMM	HIGH	IN	IN	IN	RUNNERS-UP
2	Mark	IN	IN	IN	LOW	WIN	IN	IN	WIN	IN	IN	IN	IN	WIN	IMM	PT	IN	WIN	IN	IN	WIN	IN	RUNNERS-UP
4	Jasmin	HIGH	IMM	IN	IN	WIN	IN	IN	PT	IN	LOW	IN	WIN	IN	IN	PT	HIGH	IN	WIN	IN	LOW	ELIM	
4	Zen	IN	IN	IN	IN	PT	IMM	IMM	WIN	IN	IN	IN	IN	IN	WIN	PT	WIN	IMM	HIGH	LOW	IN	ELIM	
6	I-Rin	IN	IMM	WIN	IMM	PT	IMM	IN	WIN	IN	LOW	WIN	IMM	IN	IN	WIN	IN	IN	IN	IN	ELIM		
7	Gorya	IN	IMM	IN	IN	WIN	IN	IN	LOW	IN	IN	IN	IN	IN	IN	PT	IN	IN	IN	ELIM			
7	Peach	IN	IMM	WIN	IMM	PT	IMM	IN	PT	WIN	IMM	IN	IN	IN	IN	WIN	IN	LOW	IN	ELIM			
9	Porjai	IN	IMM	IN	LOW	WIN	IN	IMM	WIN	IN	IMM	IN	IN	IN	IMM	WIN	IN	ELIM					
9	Achi	IN	WIN	IN	LOW	LOW	IMM	IMM	WIN	IN	IN	IN	IN	IN	IN	WIN	HIGH	ELIM					
11	Boom	IN	IN	WIN	IMM	WIN	IN	WIN	WIN	IN	IN	IN	IN	IN	LOW	ELIM							
11	Namsai	IN	IMM	IN	LOW	PT	IMM	IN	WIN	IN	IN	IN	IN	HIGH	IN	ELIM							
13	Poom	IN	WIN	WIN	IMM	WIN	WIN	IMM	PT	IN	IN	IN	LOW	IN	ELIM								
13	Chacha	IN	IMM	IN	LOW	WIN	IN	IN	PT	IN	IN	IN	IN	IN	ELIM								
15	Rita	IN	IMM	IN	LOW	WIN	IN	IN	PT	IN	IN	IN	ELIM										
15	Alice	IN	IMM	IN	WIN	PT	IMM	IN	WIN	IN	IN	IN	ELIM										
17	Satung	IN	IN	IN	LOW	PT	IMM	IN	WIN	IN	ELIM												
17	Captain	IN	WIN	IN	LOW	PT	IMM	IN	WIN	IN	ELIM												
19	Tan	IN	IN	WIN	IMM	WIN	IN	IMM	ELIM														
20	KC	WIN	IMM	IN	LOW	PT	IMM	WIN	WDR														
21	C-Nine	IN	IN	IN	IN	LOW	IMM	ELIM															
21	Mel	IM	IMM	IN	IN	WIN	IN	ELIM															
23	En Doo	IN	IMM	WIN	IMM	ELIM																	
23	Praew	IN	IMM	WIN	IMM	ELIM																	
25	Nano	IN	ELIM																				
25	Raphael	HIGH	ELIM																				

(WINNER) This cook won the competition.
(RUNNER-UP) This cook finished in second place.
(WIN) The cook won an individual challenge (Mystery Box Challenge or Invention Test).
(WIN) The cook was on the winning team in the Team Challenge and directly advanced to the next round.
(HIGH) The cook was one of the top entries in an individual challenge, but didn't win.
(IN) The cook wasn't selected as a top or bottom entry in an individual challenge.
(IN) The cook wasn't selected as a top or bottom entry in a team challenge.
(IMM) The cook didn't have to compete in that round of the competition and was safe from elimination.
(PT) The cook was on the losing team in the Team Challenge and competed in the Pressure Test.
(NPT) The cook was on the losing team in the Team Challenge, did not compete in the Pressure Test, and advanced.
(LOW) The cook was one of the bottom entries in an individual challenge, but wasn't the last person to advance.
(LOW) The cook was one of the bottom entries in an individual challenge, and the last person to advance.
(LOW) The cook was one of the bottom entries in the Team Challenge and they were the only person from their team to advance
(LOW) The cook was eliminated but saved from elimination.
(WDR) The cook withdrew from competition.
(ELIM) The cook was eliminated from MasterChef.
