= Ian Kittichai =

Thai chef (born 1968)

- Born: Bangkok, Thailand
- Education: apprenticeship, Sydney Technical College
- Spouse: Sarah Chang
- Culinary career
- Cooking style: Thai
- Current restaurants
- Issaya Siamese Club (Bangkok, Thailand); Khum Hom (Bangkok, Thailand); Anaalā (Phang-Nga, Thailand); Soi Social (Singapore); Spot Dessert Bar (New York, New York); Coast (Taiwan); Kò Sà-Wăn (The Bahamas)
- Website: www.iankittichai.com

Pongtawat "Ian" Chalermkittichai (Thai: พงษ์ธวัช เฉลิมกิตติชัย), known in English as Ian Kittichai (born 27 January 1968), is a chef, restaurateur, television personality and cookbook writer. He is credited with being instrumental in changing predominant perceptions of Thai cuisine and one of the earliest proponents of the modernisation of Thai cuisine. He and his restaurants have earned acclaim from the New York Times, Food & Wine, Travel + Leisure and other publications. One of his restaurants, Issaya Siamese Club, has been listed on Asia's 50 Best Restaurants, a division of The World's 50 Best Restaurants, and ranked number 39 in 2018. Australian Traveller magazine listed Issaya Siamese Club as one of the world’s hottest restaurants in 2018.

Kittichai’s cookbook Issaya Siamese Club: Innovative Thai Cuisine by Chef Ian Kittichai, released in April 2013, placed first in the Best Authors and Chefs category for Thailand, and third for the Best Cookbook of The Year in the Gourmand World Cookbook Awards 2014 held in Beijing in May 2014.

In 2006 and 2012 Kittichai appeared on the television show Iron Chef America to compete with Mario Batali and Marc Forgione respectively. Since 2012 he also appears regularly on Iron Chef Thailand as Iron Chef Innovative Western Cuisine as well as the Lead Judge on MasterChef Thailand and MasterChef Junior Thailand; Co-Host of Bid Coin Chef and judge of Hell's Kitchen Thailand.

== Early life ==
As a child growing up in Bangkok, Kittichai accompanied his mother on daily trips to local markets before school, and then sold her curry rice from a cart after school.

While a student in London, Kittichai worked part-time at London's Waldorf Hotel, whose management paid for him to attend cooking school at Southeast London Colleges for two years. He then moved to Sydney, where he apprenticed at Claude’s French restaurant in the mid-1980s and attended culinary school at Sydney Technical College.

== Career ==
After returning to his home in Bangkok, Kittichai was hired at the Four Seasons Bangkok (now Anantara Siam Bangkok Hotel), where he eventually became the world’s first Thai to be named Executive Chef of an international five-star hotel, in charge of the Four Seasons’ Thai, Italian, and Japanese dining outlets.

In 2003, Kittichai opened Kittichai, a modern Thai restaurant in New York's SIXTY Soho (formerly 60 Thompson) which earned a listing in Travel + Leisure magazine’s Best New American Restaurants 2004. The following year, Food & Wine called Kittichai the best Thai restaurant in America, praising the elegant décor as well as the cuisine.

In 2011, Kittichai established Issaya Siamese Club, a contemporary Thai restaurant in a 100-year-old villa in Bangkok. The restaurant has made Asia's 50 Best Restaurants, a list produced by UK media company William Reed Business Media, based on a poll of international chefs, restaurateurs, gourmands and restaurant critics. Most recently the restaurant was ranked number 39 in 2018. Traveller magazine in Australia also listed Issaya Siamese Club as one of the world’s hottest restaurants in 2018.

In 2011, Kittichai also joined Spot Dessert Bar, an Asian-American dessert bar group founded in New York City.

To coordinate Kittichai’s restaurant interests and consultative contracts around the globe, the chef and his wife Sarah Chang operate Cuisine Concept Co. Ltd., an international food and beverage industry consulting and management firm based in Bangkok.

== Restaurants ==
In 2003, Kittichai opened Kittichai, a modern Thai restaurant in New York's SIXTY Soho (formerly 60 Thompson) which earned a listing in Travel + Leisure magazine’s Best New American Restaurants 2004. The following year, Food & Wine called Kittichai the best Thai restaurant in America, praising the elegant décor as well as the cuisine.

In 2011, Kittichai became the Culinary Director and a Partner in New York eatery, Spot Dessert Bar, where the chef’s skill with pastries and desserts is showcased. Among the dessert “tapas” at Spot Dessert Bar is “The Harvest”, a combination of crumbled cookie and cake layered with fruits and cream to resemble a potted house plant. Locations for Spot Dessert Bar in New York are St. Marks Place, Flushing, Long Island Cityand Astoria. A Cherry Hill location in New Jersey opened in 2024.

In Bangkok, Kittichai joined Thai chef Arisara Chongphanitkul, who had been his pastry chef at Issaya Siamese Club, to open Issaya La Patisserie at Central Embassy mall in 2014. Dedicated to pastry, dessert, and sweet creations blending Thai and international influences, the patisserie was later located in EmQuartier mall’s Helix Tower then closed in 2020.

The same year, the chef took over the cuisine at Tangerine restaurant at Resorts World Sentosa, Singapore, focusing on a farm-to-table menu featuring both classic and contemporary Thai flavors. Tangerine closed in 2020.

Also in 2014, Kittichai established Issaya Cooking Studio in Bangkok’s Central Embassy mall. Courses at the 170-square-meter cooking school facility range from classical and basic Thai cuisine to molecular and modern culinary technique, and from beginner to professional chef levels. The school is aimed at clients who are already familiar with Thai cooking. The Studio closed in 2020 at the start of the covid-19 pandemic.

In 2022 Chef Kittichai opened Soi Social, a Thai brasserie, with Resorts World Sentosa in Singapore. The menu features dishes such as Chiang Mai duck sausage perfumed by wild betel leaf, ginger, peanuts and chillies; seared scallop in “Nam-Tok” E-sarn style in a saw leaf coriander dressing; and a roasted marinated duck served with Thai red curry sauce.

The same year, Kittichai partnered with Mövenpick BDMS Wellness Resort Bangkok to open Khum Hom, a restaurant centered on regional Thai cuisine. According to the Bangkok Post, the restaurant uses local ingredients in dishes based on recipes from Thailand's four main regions: North, Northeast, Central, and South. Khum Hom was included in the Michelin Guide Thailand's restaurant selections for 2025.

Anaalā, a restaurant at Iniala Beach House on Natai Beach in Phang Nga, Thailand, opened in December 2024. The restaurant's name derives from a Sanskrit word for fire, referencing its live-fire beach barbecue concept. The restaurant's menu rotates on an eight-day cycle and is based on daily-caught fish and seasonal ingredients from Thailand's four regions, with some dishes grilled over an open beach barbecue.

Anaalā opened alongside The Campana Lounge, another new restaurant at the property, and joins Aulis Phuket, a Michelin-starred restaurant at Iniala Beach House overseen by chef Simon Rogan.

In May 2025, Kittichai opened Kò Sà-Wăn, a Thai dining pop-up at Perch restaurant at The Cove, Atlantis Paradise Island, in the Bahamas. The restaurant served Thai dishes incorporating some Bahamian ingredients.

In March 2026, Kittichai made his debut at the Nassau Paradise Island Wine & Food Festival, an annual culinary event at Atlantis Paradise Island, alongside chefs including José Andrés, Tom Colicchio, and Rachael Ray. The festival's programming included a Kò Sà-Wăn dinner party.

== Filmography ==
| Year | Show | Role | Season and Episode |
|---|---|---|---|
| 2007 | Iron Chef America | Challenger | S3 EP.22 |
| 2001-2011 | Chef Mue Thong | Host | - |
| 2012 | Iron Chef Japan | Challenger | New Year’s Eve Special |
| 2012–present | Iron Chef Thailand | Iron Chef: Western-Innovative Cuisine | - |
| 2013 | Iron Chef America | Challenger | S11 EP.4 |
| 2014 | Nat Geo People: Chef to Chef with Ian Kittichai | Guest | - |
| 2015 | Food Reporter: Ian Kittichai Issaya Bangkok: Kijkje in de keuken | Guest | - |
| 2016 | Life Inspired (LITV ASIA): Taste Bangkok: Issaya Siamese Club I Chef Ian Kittichai | Guest | - |
| 2016 | Asian Food Network: “Inspired with Anna Olsen” with Chef Ian Chalermkittichai | Guest | EP.3 |
| 2017–present | MasterChef Thailand | Judge | S1–6 |
| 2018–present | MasterChef Junior Thailand | Judge | S1–2 |
| 2018 | Somebody Feed Phil | Guest | S1 EP.1 |
| 2018 | The Culinary Institute of America: A Food Tour of Thailand | Guest | - |
| 2018 | The Big Kitchen | Co-host | - |
| 2019 | The Next Iron Chef Thailand | Judge | S1 |
| 2020 | MasterChef Thailand All-Stars | Judge | S1 |
| 2022-2023 | Bid Coin Chef | Co-host & judge | S1–2 |
| 2023 | Top Chef Thailand | Guest judge | S4 EP.6 |
| 2024 | Hell's Kitchen Thailand | Judge | S1 |
| 2025 | MasterChef The Professionals Thailand | Judge | S1 |
| 2025 | Hell's Kitchen Thailand season 2 | Judge | S2 |
| 2025 | Iron Chef VS Asia | Iron Chef Thailand | S1 |
| 2025 | Dish It Out (Tilly Ramsay) | Guest | S1 |
| 2026 | MasterChef Thailand | Judge | S7 |
| 2026 | Bid Coin Chef | Co-host & judge | S3 |

== Works ==
- Kittichai, Ian. Issaya Siamese Club Cookbook: Innovative Thai Cuisine by Chef Ian Kittichai Avril Production, 2013 ISBN 9786169162902
- Kittichai, Ian and Chongphanitkul Apisara. La Patisserie Issaya Pastry Cookbook Avril Production, 2016. ISBN 9786169162926
- Kittichai, Ian. Chef Ian’s Kitchen Revealed Amarin Cuisine, 2011 ISBN 9786162071294
