= Piyathida Mittiraroch =

Thai actress and host (born 1975)

- ปิยธิดา มิตรธีรโรจน์
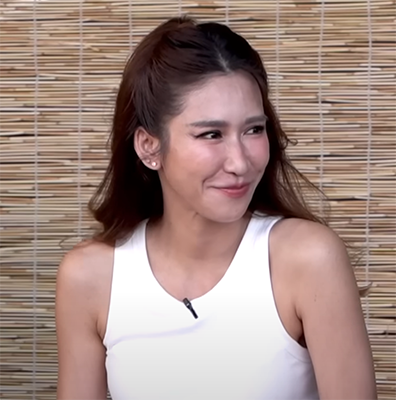
- Born: Piyathida Woramusik; 22 June 1975 (age 51); Bangkok, Thailand
- Other name: Pock (ป๊อก)
- Occupations: Actress; host; model
- Years active: 1996–present
- Height: 156 cm (5 ft 1 in)
- Spouse(s): Napassakorn Mittiraroch (2012–present)

Piyathida Mittiraroch (Thai: ปิยธิดา มิตรธีรโรจน์; born 22 June 1975) is a Thai actress and host.

== Life and family ==
On 22 December 2012: Piyathida married Napassakorn Mittiraroch.

== Filmography ==
=== Television series ===
Year	Title	Role
1996	Talonthua	Phloikarat
1997	Seum Noi Noi Gub Laawn Mak Noi	Pannatee
1997	Pleum	Pannatee
1998	Duang Jai Krasip Ruk	Khimtong
1998	Chaloei	Yupadee
1998	Torranee Ni Nee Krai Krong	Darunee
1998	Saam Num Nuer Tong	Arunsi
1999	Sao Noi Pra Pang	Pang
1999	Game Kammathep	Manika
2000	Mee Pieng Ruk	Jidapa / Jaokha
2000	Kaew Klang Dong	Mewadee / Kratae
2000	Roy Marn	Bee
2001	Sood Hua Jai	Monthira
2001	Pinprai	Pinprai
2002	Haat Hansa	Noi
2002	Khon Ta Tip	Naree
2003	Yiew Sao Muer Mai	Patsaree / Pet
2004	Sapai Zah Mae Yah Hien	Ornkamon
2004	Nai Ruen Jai	Korrapin
2005	Mong Dang	Nisa / Mong Dang
2006	Jai Diew	Saowarot
2007	Ruk Tae Zaab Lai	Chomjun
2007	Talay Saab Nok Gawao	Penpitchaya
2008	Nang Tard	Khun Ying Yam
2009	Mia Luang	Dr. Wiganda Phanpakorn
2011	Som Waan Namtarn Priew	Naiyika
2011	Talad Arom	Bongkot
2011	Lieutenant Opas	Sunee / Wipha (Guest)
2012	4 Version 4 Problems	Chonlada
2013	Pan Ruk Pan Rai	M.L. Noppadara Siwawong / Khun Dara
2013	Fai Huan	Madam Mani / Khun Ying Jaopak
2013	Keu Hat Ta Krong Pi Pop	Khun Ying Sri
2013	Dekchai Nai Ngao	Wanida
2014	Office Syndrome	Pattamon
2015	Behind the Newsroom	Punchalee
2016	Office Syndrome 2	Pattamon
2017	Enchantment	Rampon
2018	Club Friday Season 9 (Ep. Hidden Love)	Phing
2018	Rai Sanaeha	Nongrarm
2018	Khun Por Jorm Sa	Thipkesorn
2018	Girl from Nowhere	Headmistress
2018	Nakark Kaew	Rachawadee
2019	Glarb Pai Soo Wun Fun	Pimchat
2020	Parenting	Suksom
2020	Wake Up Ladies: Very Complicated	Piengkwan
2022	To Sir, With Love	Li
2023	Treasure War	Kanta Loetwara
2023	Hangout	Dujdao
2024	Laplae the Hidden Town	Bua
2025	Zomvivor	Kanchana
2025	The Tastes of Lives	Parichat

=== Films ===
Year	Title	Role
2004	The Sisters	Saengdao
2011	Ladda Land	Parn
2012	A Mother's Endless Love (Ep. Like eyes from heaven)	Kobkun
2012	Together	Nuan
2013	The Cop	Malathiwa
2014	Timeline	Mat
2020	Still Missing	Pij

=== Producer ===
Year	Title
2024	Ghost (Luang Lap Jap Tai)

== Host ==
- Lady's corner
- Lun Rahat Lap
- Rak Lon Cho
- Kot La Khwa Ngoen
- Bonus Games
- Phokhrua tua Noi
- Top Yang Somkiat
- Mueang Samran
- MasterChef Thailand (2017–present)
- MasterChef Junior Thailand (2018–2024)
- MasterChef Thailand All-Stars (2020)
- MasterChef The Professionals Thailand (2025)

== Discography ==
- 1997 - ตัดใจไม่ลง Ost. Seum Noi Noi Gub Laawn Mak Noi
- 2001 - เฝ้าคอย Ost. Sood Hua Jai

== Awards ==
Year	Nominated work	Category	Result
2002	Mekhala Awards 21st	Best Actress	Won
2005	Star Entertainment Awards 2004	Outstanding actress who makes significant contributions to society	Won
2008	Asian Television Awards 2008	Best Drama Performance by an Actress	Nominated
2009	Komchadluek Award 6th	Best Actress in a Television Drama Series	Nominated
2009	Hamburger Award 2008	Best Supporting Actress	Nominated
2009	Royal Institute of Thailand Praises 2008	Outstanding Thai Language Actress (Leading Actress)	Won
2009	Seventeen Choice Awards 2009	Seventeen Star Icon	Won
2010	Komchadluek Award 7th	Best Actress in a Television Drama Series	Won
2010	Top Awards 2009	Best Leading Actress	Nominated
2010	Nine Entertain Awards 3rd	Actress of the Year	Nominated
2010	Star Entertainment Awards 2009	Best Actress	Nominated
2010	Nataraja Awards 1st	Best Actress	Nominated
2011	Siamdara Stars Awards 2011	Best Actress in a Leading Role in a Film	Nominated
2012	Starpics Awards 9th	Best Actress	Won
2012	Komchadluek Awards 9th	Best Actress in a Film	Nominated
2012	Komchadluek Awards 9th	Best Actress in a Television Drama Series	Nominated
2012	Mekhala Award 24th	Popular leading actress Mekhala	Won
2012	Mekhala Award 24th	Outstanding leading actress Mekhala	Nominated
2012	20th Thai Film Awards, Entertainment Critics Association	Best Actress	Won
2012	Suphannahong National Film Awards 21st	Best Actress	Won
2013	Starpics Awards 10th	Best Supporting Actress	Nominated
2013	Komchadluek Awards 10th	Best Supporting Actress in a Film	Won
2013	Suphannahong National Film Awards 22nd	Best Supporting Actress	Won
2013	21st Thai Film Awards, Entertainment Critics Association	Best Supporting Actress	Won
2013	Royal Suraswadi Award 29th	Best Supporting Actress	Nominated
2014	Komchadluek Awards 11th	Best Supporting Actress in a Television Drama	Nominated
2014	Nine Entertain Awards 7th	Actress of the Year	Won
2014	Nataraja Awards 5th	Best Actress	Nominated
2014	HAMBURGER 13th Anniversary Party	1 in 13 Best Covers Ever	Won
2015	Suphannahong National Film Awards 24th	Best Supporting Actress	Nominated
2015	Mthai Top Talk about 2015	The most talked about actress	Won
2015	TV Gold Awards 29th	Outstanding Supporting Actress	Nominated
2015	Thai Film Directors Association Awards	Best Supporting Actress	Nominated
2015	Komchadluek Awards 12nd	Best Supporting Actress in a Film	Nominated
2015	Royal Suraswadi Award 30th	Best Supporting Actress	Nominated
2015	Siam Dara Stars Awards 2015	Best Actress in a Television Drama Series	Nominated
2018	Royal Suraswadi Award 31st	Most Popular Female Stars (Based on Votes)	Won
2019	Nine Entertain Awards 12nd	Actress of the Year	Nominated
2019	Nataraja Awards 10th	Best Actress	Nominated
2021	D Online Awards 2021	Popular host	Nominated
2021	Nataraja Awards 12th	Best Actress	Nominated
2021	TV Gold Awards 35th	Outstanding Leading Actress	Nominated
2023	Pantip Television Awards 2nd	Best Actress	Nominated
2023	Komchadluek Awards 19th	Best Supporting Actress in a Television Drama	Nominated
2024	Pantip Television Awards 3rd	Best Supporting Actress	Nominated
2024	TV Gold Awards 38th	Outstanding Supporting Actress	Won
2024	Nine Entertain Awards 14th	Creative Acting Team of the Year	Nominated
2025	Zoomdara Awards 2025	The hottest actors of the year	Won
2025	Pantip Television Awards 4th	Best Actress	Nominated
2025	Pantip Television Awards 4th	Outstanding Performance by a Cast	Nominated
2025	Baan Nang Lakorn Awards 21st	Outstanding performance by an actress in a leading role	Won
2025	Khomchadluek Awards 21st time	Best Actress in a Television Drama Series	Nominated
2025	Nataraja Awards 16th	Best Actress (Drama and Series after 8:00 p.m., 14 episodes or more)	Nominated
