= HKG =

HKG can mean the following:

- Hong Kong International Airport or Chek Lap Kok Airport, IATA code
  - Kai Tak Airport, former Hong Kong International Airport
- Hong Kong, ISO 3166-1 alpha-3 country code
- Port of Hong Kong, the seaport of Hong Kong

== See also ==
- HK (disambiguation)
- Hgk (disambiguation)
- GKH (disambiguation)
- GHK (disambiguation)
- KGH (disambiguation)
- KHG (disambiguation)
