= MasterChef The Professionals Thailand =

Season of television series

- No. of episodes: 15

Release
- Original network: Channel 7
- Original release: February 9 – June 1, 2025

MasterChef The Professionals Thailand is a cooking game show, spun off from MasterChef Thailand. It originally aired every Sunday starting on February 9, 2025 on Channel 7, and became the first series to make its debut in Netflix Thailand. The show is hosted by Piyathida Mittiraroch and the judges are Pasan Svastivatana, Kwantip Devakula and Pongtawat Chalermkittichai. In this season, the contestants are professional chefs from various cooking show franchises, including chefs from Hell's Kitchen, Top Chef, The Next Iron Chef, and former MasterChef contestants.

While it has only been available on Netflix Thailand after broadcasting on television, the show finally opens up the full episodes on YouTube starting on June 21, 2026. On that day, it released the first 2 episodes, and later released the next 2 episodes on the following day and so on. The show finished releasing the entire series on June 27, 2026, which was the only day that release the final 3 episodes simultaneously.

This season's grand finale also have the most entries, where 5 chefs competed in that round. It is won by Chef Toey (Saharat Taengthai), while Chef Ged (Wisakha Ravijan) placed second, and Chef Tien (Tienchai Perapongsaton) in third place.

== Contestants ==
=== Final 18 ===
Contestant	Occupation	Previous Shows / Seasons	Previous Ranking(s)	Status	Number of Wins
Saharat Taengthai (Toey)	Chef Owner	The Next Iron Chef Thailand (Season 1)	6	Winner on June 1	4
Wisakha Ravijan (Ged)	Chef Owner	Top Chef Thailand 2023	2	Runner-up on June 1	4
Tienchai Perapongsaton (Tien)	Chef Owner	Top Chef Thailand 2023	6	Third Place on June 1	6
Nutnicha Bunlert (Ploy)	Chef Owner	Season 1	3	Fourth Place on June 1	4
Nutnicha Bunlert (Ploy)	Chef Owner	All-Stars	9	Fourth Place on June 1	4
Nutnicha Bunlert (Ploy)	Chef Owner	Top Chef Thailand 2023	4	Fourth Place on June 1	4
Chanin Cheema (Quest)	Co-Chef Owner	Season 3	2	Fifth Place on May 25; Returned on April 27; Eliminated on March 30	6
Chanin Cheema (Quest)	Co-Chef Owner	All-Stars	2	Fifth Place on May 25; Returned on April 27; Eliminated on March 30	6
Natthasimaporn Lakchai (Kerr)	Chef Owner	Hell's Kitchen Thailand (Season 1)	2	Eliminated on May 25	1
Thanapat Suyaw (First)	Chef Owner	Season 2	Winner	Eliminated on May 25	2
Thanapat Suyaw (First)	Chef Owner	The Next Iron Chef Thailand (Season 1)	5	Eliminated on May 25	2
Bunyawee Pakwisan (Lookchan)	Creative Chef & Consultant	Junior MasterChef Thailand	N/A	Eliminated on May 11	0
Bunyawee Pakwisan (Lookchan)	Creative Chef & Consultant	Hell's Kitchen Thailand (Season 1)	3	Eliminated on May 11	0
Ratchawat Vichianrat (Keng)	Executive Chef & Owner	The Next Iron Chef Thailand (Season 2)	2	Eliminated on May 4	3
Ratchawat Vichianrat (Keng)	Executive Chef & Owner	Hell's Kitchen Thailand (Season 1)	6	Eliminated on May 4	3
Chaphonphat Daphachutison (Jib)	Thai Chef de Cuisine	Hell's Kitchen Thailand (Season 1)	3	Eliminated on April 27	3
Valasura Na Lampang (Zetrong)	Chef Owner	Season 6	Winner	Eliminated on April 20	1
Sarawoot Nienvitoon (Man)	Chef Instructor, Culinary Arts	The Next Iron Chef Thailand (Season 1)	3	Eliminated on April 6	2
Jareuk Sriaroon	Culinary Lecturer	The Next Iron Chef Thailand (Season 2)	6	Eliminated on March 30	2
Jareuk Sriaroon	Culinary Lecturer	Top Chef Thailand 2023	5	Eliminated on March 30	2
Pichet Sanankong (Chet)	Executive Chef	Top Chef Thailand 2023	7	Eliminated on March 9	2
Wayupak Muangchorn (Jom)	Executive Area Chef	The Next Iron Chef Thailand (Season 1)	8	Eliminated on March 2	1
Wayupak Muangchorn (Jom)	Executive Area Chef	Bid Coin Chef (season 1)	Winner	Eliminated on March 2	1
Paweenuch Yodpreechawijit (Kaew)	Private Chef & Catering	Season 1	Winner	Eliminated on February 23	1
Paweenuch Yodpreechawijit (Kaew)	Private Chef & Catering	The Next Iron Chef Thailand (Season 2)	4	Eliminated on February 23	1
Naradon Pukason (Beer)	Chef Owner	Hell's Kitchen Thailand (Season 1)	5	Eliminated on February 16	0
Nuntawat Chanyalikit (Max)	Chef Owner	Season 3	Winner	Eliminated on February 16	0

Future appearances:

- Chefs Toey, First and Zetrong appeared as special guests in Episode 5 of Season 7.

== Elimination Table ==
Place	Contestants	Episodes																												
Place	Contestants	1	2		3				4		5		6	7		8		9		10		11		12		13	14	15		
1	Toey	LOW	IN	IN	IN	IN	IN	LOW	WIN	IMM	IN	HIGH	WIN	IMM	IN	IN	IN	IN	IMM		IN	IN	IN	LOW	IN	IN	LOW	IN	WIN	WINNER
2	Ged	LOW	WIN	IN	IN	WIN	IMM		LOW	LOW	WIN	IMM	LOW	WIN	HIGH	IN	LOW	HIGH	IMM		IN	HIGH	LOW	PT	IMM	HIGH	HIGH	IN	IN	RUNNER-UP
3	Tien	IN	IMM	IN	WIN	IMM			LOW	HIGH	IN	IN	PT	IMM	WIN	HIGH	WIN	LOW	IMM		WIN	IN	IN	LOW	IN	IN	WIN	WIN	IN	FINALIST
4	Ploy	WIN	IMM	IN	IN	IN	WIN	IMM	LOW	IN	HIGH	WIN	PT	IMM	IN	WIN	IMM	IN	IMM		LOW	IN	IN	PT	IMM	IN	IN	FINALIST		
5	Quest	HIGH	IMM	HIGH	IN	WIN	IMM		LOW	IN	HIGH	IN	WIN	IMM	ELIM				IN	RET	IN	IN	WIN	WIN	IMM	WIN	FINALIST			
6	Kerr	HIGH	IMM	IN	IN	IN	IN	PT	IN	IMM	IN	IN	PT	IMM	IN	IN	LOW	IN	IMM		WIN	IN	HIGH	PT	IMM	ELIM				
6	First	IN	IMM	HIGH	IN	IN	IN	PT	LOW	IN	IN	IN	WIN	IMM	IN	IN	IN	IN	IMM		IN	WIN	IMM	PT	IMM	ELIM				
8	Lookchan	LOW	LOW	LOW	IN	IN	IN	PT	IN	IMM	IN	IN	PT	IMM	IN	IN	IN	LOW	IMM		IN	HIGH	LOW	LOW	ELIM					
9	Keng	IN	IMM	IN	IN	IN	IN	WIN	HIGH	IMM	IN	LOW	WIN	IMM	IN	HIGH	IN	WIN	IMM		LOW	IN	ELIM							
10	Jib	IN	IMM	WIN	IN	IN	WIN	IMM	HIGH	IMM	IN	LOW	WIN	IMM	LOW	IN	IN	IN	IMM		ELIM									
11	Zetrong	IN	IMM	IN	IN	IN	IN	LOW	IN	IMM	IN	IN	PT	IMM	LOW	IN	WIN	ELIM	IN	OUT										
12	Man	LOW	LOW	IN	IN	WIN	IMM		LOW	LOW	IN	IN	WIN	IMM	IN	IN	ELIM		OUT											
13	Jareuk	LOW	HIGH	IN	WIN	IMM			LOW	WIN	IN	IN	LOW	ELIM					IN	OUT										
14	Chet	WIN	IMM	HIGH	WIN	IMM			IN	IMM	IN	ELIM							OUT											
15	Jom	HIGH	IMM	LOW	IN	IN	WIN	IMM	LOW	ELIM									OUT											
16	Kaew	WIN	IMM	IN	IN	IN	IN	ELIM											OUT											
17	Beer	IN	IMM	ELIM															OUT											
18	Max	LOW	ELIM																IN	OUT										

(WINNER) This chef won the competition.
(RUNNER-UP) This chef finished in second place.
(FINALIST) The chefs are among the finalists but was eliminated in the grand finale.
(WIN) The chef won an individual challenge (Mystery Box Challenge, Invention Test or Pressure Test).
(WIN) The chef was on the winning team in the Team Challenge and directly advanced to the next round.
(HIGH) The chef was one of the top entries in an individual challenge, but didn't win.
(IN) The chef wasn't selected as a top or bottom entry in an individual challenge.
(IN) The chef wasn't selected as a top or bottom entry in a team challenge.
(IMM) The chef didn't have to compete in that round of the competition and was safe from elimination.
(PT) The chef competed in the Pressure Test round.
(LOW) The cook was one of the bottom entries in the Team challenge, and must compete in an elimination round.
(LOW) The chef was one of the bottom entries in an individual challenge, but wasn't the last person to advance.
(LOW) The chef was one of the bottom entries in an individual challenge, and the last person to advance.
(LOW) The chef was at the bottom-most entry but saved from elimination.
(ELIM) The chef was eliminated from MasterChef.
(IN) The chef came back for a chance to win re-entry to the competition, and pass the first round of Vote Back.
(OUT) The chef came back for a chance to win re-entry into the competition, but lost in the Vote Back round.
(RET) The chef won the Vote Back round and returned to the competition.

== Episode Titles ==
Episode	Native Title	First aired	Released Date on YouTube
1	การรวมตัวครั้งสำคัญ	February 9, 2025	June 22, 2026 (Note: Originally released on June 21, 2026, but was delayed due to the technical issues.)
2	จานละ 3 นาที	February 16, 2025	June 22, 2026
3	ที่สุดของทักษะ	February 23, 2025	June 22, 2026
4	Food Truck สุดโหด	March 2, 2025	June 22, 2026
5	คำตัดสิน	March 9, 2025	June 23, 2026
6	เชฟแซ่บ VS. พ่อค้าซ่า	March 23, 2025	June 23, 2026
7	เพื่อนรักหักเหลี่ยมโหด	March 30, 2025	June 24, 2026
8	คนไทยรึเปล่า?	April 6, 2025	June 24, 2026
9	โอกาสที่ 2	April 20, 2025	June 25, 2026
10	โอกาสสุดท้าย	April 27, 2025	June 25, 2026
11	น้อยแต่มาก	May 4, 2025	June 26, 2026
12	ฉันต้องรอด	May 11, 2025	June 26, 2026
13	สู้เพื่อชีวิต	May 18, 2025	June 27, 2026
14	รอบชิงชนะเลิศ 1 - ใจสลาย	May 25, 2025	June 27, 2026
15	จบบริบูรณ์	June 1, 2025	June 27, 2026

== Episodes ==
=== Episode 1 ===
Original airdate: Sunday, 9 February 2025

The season begins with a brief introduction of all 18 professional chefs competing. Shortly before starting the competition, Chef Ian has offered each contestants a glass of mocktail to enjoy. Little do they know, there is a hidden card underneath with an alphabet that puts them into 6 different teams.

Professional Kitchen Challenge: In this challenge, each team will be responsible for their assigned chef's signature dish. The chefs are six head chefs from Hell's Kitchen Thailand, including Chef Ian Kittichai, Chef Pom Kwantip, Chef Willment Leong, Chef Pruek Samphanthawat, Chef R Teerapat, and Chef Off Nattawoot. The final teams and assigned dishes are the following:

Team color	Letter	Assigned head chef	Members	Signature dish
Red team	I	Chef Ian	Jom, Kerr and Quest	Beef Tenderloin Beef Jus Sauce
Yellow team	PR	Chef Pruek	Man, Ged and Toei	Salmon Orloff Beurre Rouge Sauce
Orange team	W	Chef Willment	Beer, Tien and Zetrong	Trio Texture Salmon
Purple team	O	Chef Off	Chet, Kaew and Ploy	Pinwheel Steak Lemon Miso Orecchiette
Blue team	R	Chef R	Keng, Jib and First	Poach Scallop roulade with Scallop Croquette
Green team	PO	Chef Pom	Jareuk, Max and Lookchan	Yum Yai (16-component Thai salad)

The contestants will need to make no less than 200 orders total for 100 guests, and the head chefs will ensure the quality of each dish throughout the competition. They must replicate their head chef's signature dish with only a printed recipe packet available for self studying, as there are no demonstrations prior to the competition. There will be only 60 minutes per team to prepare before service. After that, they will be given only 7 minutes per order, and they must complete it on time no matter how many dishes each order needs or whether the order overlaps with the other orders. If they couldn't make it, the time count will be negative. Overall, the team with the best time management is Purple team.

- Preparation Time: 60 minutes (1 hour)
- Time limit per order: 7 minutes

After the service is over, the head chefs have gathered to taste every teams' dishes and decide the best overall dish. As a result, Red team got the best overall dish. After the scores are combined from the head chefs, all 100 guests, and time management, Purple team wins the challenge and Red team in second. The bottom two teams, Yellow team and Green team, will be facing Invention Restaurant round for an elimination.

- Winning team: Purple team
- Teams facing elimination: Yellow and Green team

=== Episode 2 ===
Original airdate: Sunday, 16 February 2025

Invention Restaurant: In this round, the bottom two teams from the previous challenge must compete for an elimination, with six different main ingredients for each contestants. To offer the chefs a small "relief" from stress, Chef Ian has offered each contestants a glass of mocktail once again; this time, whatever color glass they got determines the main ingredient chefs must cook with. The selections are the following:

Color	Main Ingredient	Contestant
Red	Pork kidney	Chef Ged
Yellow	Pork liver	Chef Jareuk
Orange	Pork lungs	Chef Lookchan
Purple	Cow rag (black)	Chef Max
Green	Cow spleen	Chef Man
Blue	Cow intestine	Chef Toei

The chefs will be competing in the theme of innovative Thai street food. They will have 60 minutes to prepare their dishes for the main judges and guest judges from The Spoon --in total of 20 judges, 20 dishes.

- Time: 60 minutes (1 hour)

As a result, Chef Ged had the best performance, Chef Jareuk in second. Unfortunately, Chef Max scored the least and was eliminated from the competition.

- Round winner: Chef Ged
- Bottom three: Lookchan, Max and Man
- Eliminated: Chef Max

Black Mystery Box: In this round, the 17 remaining contestants must create a dish from four simple main ingredients: 1 whole corn, 1 egg, 1 tomato, and 3 strips of imitation crab sticks. They are given 60 minutes to cook and there will be one person eliminated from this round.

- Time: 60 minutes (1 hour)
- Four best dishes: Jib, First, Quest and Chet
- Round winner: Chef Jib
- Bottom three: Jom, Lookchan and Beer
- Eliminated: Chef Beer

=== Episode 3 ===
Original airdate: Sunday, 23 February 2025

Skill Test: In this challenge, all 16 chefs are being tested with their knife skills, which splits into 3 different rounds. For each round, the first 3 chefs that finishes will grant an immunity spot for the week. This is determined by both their speed and accuracy.

Round 1: Tunnel bone from a whole chicken

Chefs must take out the tunnel bone from a whole chicken without tearing off any part of the skin and meat. The bones on the wings is an exception. For their final product, the chicken must remain in its original shape, and the tunnel bone must not have any excess meat stuck onto it. Each chefs are only given 2 whole chickens; meaning, mistakes can only be made once. As a result, Chef Tien, Chef Chet, and Chef Jareuk won the first round.

- Winners: Tien, Chet and Jareuk

Round 2: Butterfly a mackerel

In this round, the remaining chefs must filet a mackerel into a butterfly shape. There should be no bones left on the fish, and it must be a single piece without any holes and cuts in the middle. Its tail should also attach to each other. The inside of the fish must also be thoroughly cleaned. Each chefs are given 10 mackerels, and they must present 5 perfect butterfly mackerel filets. As a result, Chef Ged, Chef Man, and Chef Quest won the second round.

- Winners: Ged, Man and Quest

Round 3: A perfect Chili Fish Sauce

The last round of skill test measures both the chefs' knife skills and taste. For a professional chili fish sauce (Nam Pla Prik), they must use 50 grams of Thai red chili, 50 grams of Thai green chili, 50 grams of shallots, and 50 grams of garlic. All ingredients must be sliced equally throughout the bowl, yet the judges will also be checking for food waste; if a judge spot a contestant making food waste, they will lose the challenge. The taste must be authentic like the original. As a result, Chef Ploy, Chef Jib, and Chef Jom won the last round.

- Winners: Ploy, Jib and Jom

Pressure Test 1: Signature dish from Chef Pam Pichaya

In this round, the 7 remaining chefs will be replicating a signature dish from Chef Pam, a Michelin-star chef that is named the 2025 World's Best Female Chef, yet she is also a judge in Top Chef Thailand. The dish that she prepared for the contestants is "Pigeon steak with red wine sauce and black pepper jam", which consists of 6 components: pigeon breast steak, confit pigeon legs, red wine sauce, chestnut purée, black pepper jam, and crispy leek as the garnish. The criteria is as follows:

1. The skin of the pigeon's breast must be crispy, the inside must cook to medium-rare.

2. The pigeon's confit legs must be thoroughly cooked, juicy and tender.

3. Chestnut purée must have a smooth texture, not too dry and clumpy.

4. All 6 components must be completed with everything taste and plate like the original.

Because this is a professional kitchen, all chefs only have the sample dish and a recipe packet to self study, and there will be no live demonstrations.

- Time: 60 minutes (1 hour)

After the judges have tasted all the dishes, Chef Keng's dish was the closest to the original. Sadly, Chef Kaew scored the least and was eliminated.

- Round winner: Chef Keng
- Bottom three: Kaew, Zetrong and Toei
- Eliminated: Chef Kaew

=== Episode 4 ===
Original Airdate: Sunday, 2 March 2025

Mystery Box Team Challenge: In this round, all contestants will be working in pairs to cook a dish suitable for a food truck. They will be serving around 300 primary school students during the school's lunch time. The ingredients in the mystery box include chicken, carrots, corn, tomatoes, cheese, eggs, onions, potatoes, and green onions.

All chefs got the opportunity to pick their own pairs. However, there are 15 contestants left so far, which means one person will left with nobody, and therefore must work by himself--that fate falls to Chef Toei. The final teams are the following:

Color of Food Truck	Members
Pink	Chef Toei
Yellow	Chef Jib and Chef Keng
Blue	Chef Kerr and Chef Lookchan
Purple	Chef Chet and Chef Zetrong
Black	Chef Man and Chef Jom
Orange	Chef Ged and Chef Jareuk
Green	Chef Tien and Chef Ploy
Red	Chef Quest and Chef First

Each pair will be serving in their own Saleng, or a bicycle version of a food truck. After the 60-minute preparation time is over, they all have to bike to school (which is 7 kilometers, or around 4 miles away). For Chef Toei, he is given only a cart (without a bicycle to ride), so he must haul himself and the cart to school. After the chefs have reached the school, they will have 90 minutes to sell and serve their food to the students; the timer will start once the first team has reached the school. Each student will have 3 tickets to buy a meal from a team of their choice. Four teams with the most sales will get an immunity for the week.

- Preparation Time: 60 minutes (1 hour)
- Selling Time: 90 minutes (1 hour 30 minutes)

After the service is done, Pink team (Chef Toei) was able to reach the highest amount of sales, Yellow team came in second. The four least amount of sales goes to Red, Green, Orange, and Black team, and they will be facing an elimination round.

- Winning team: Pink team
- Teams facing elimination: Red team, Green team, Orange team and Black team.

Invention Test 2: For the remaining 8 chefs that lost the team challenge, they will face an invention test round which will eliminate one of them. The chefs are given 2 main ingredients for this challenge, and they are Alaskan king crab (which little do they know, it's frozen) and chili paste. The challenge is to upgrade a normal Tom Yum soup to a fine-dining, world-class worthy dish. They will have 60 minutes to prepare the dish for the judges.

- Time: 60 minutes (1 hour)

After the judges have tasted everyone's dish, Chef Jareuk presented the best dish, Chef Tien in second. Unfortunately, Chef Jom's dish scored the least and was eliminated from the competition.

- Round winner: Chef Jareuk
- Bottom three: Ged, Man and Jom
- Eliminated: Chef Jom

=== Episode 5 ===
Original Airdate: Sunday, 9 March 2025

Mystery Box 3: In this round, the 14 remaining chefs will be facing a mystery box challenge, with the main ingredient being curry powder. However, there's a twist: this week, the contestants choose which station they would like to work in, and that determines the order each chefs get to choose their second main ingredient. If they choose the first station, they get to go first, and so on. There are 14 different main ingredients available, one for each contestant. The final selections are:

Station No.	Chef Name	Main Ingredient #2	Station No.	Chef Name	Main Ingredient #2
1	Chef First	Durian	2	Chef Man	Rubyfish
3	Chef Toei	Tofu	4	Chef Quest	Strawberry
5	Chef Ged	Persimmon	6	Chef Ploy	Cow liver
7	Chef Tien	Pork loin	8	Chef Kerr	Mulberry
9	Chef Jareuk	Mussels	10	Chef Zetrong	Angus beef (Ribeye cut)
11	Chef Chet	Pork rind	12	Chef Lookchan	Squid
13	Chef Keng	Jellyfish	14	Chef Jib	Horse crab

- Time: 60 minutes (1 hour)

As a result, Chef Ged wins the round and granted herself immunity for the week.

- Three best dishes: Quest, Ged and Ploy
- Round winner: Chef Ged

Invention test 3: For this week's elimination, the chefs were told by the judges that they will be cooking their signature dish, but only 2 minutes in MasterChef supermarket. It turns out that the moment the chefs entered the supermarket, the only ingredient they witnessed is a room full with different types of apples, which is eventually the main ingredient they must cook with. The theme for this round is desserts from apple, and they have 60 minutes to cook their dish. But, before they begin cooking, the judge give Chef Ged (winner from last round) a chance to sabotage her competitors by taking away baskets full of apples from 5 chefs and trade them with only one red apple for the entire dish. Eventually, Chef Ged decides to trade with Chet, Quest, Kerr, Keng and Man.

- Time: 60 minutes (1 hour)

As a result, Chef Ploy's dish was the best, Chef Toei got second. On the other hand, Chef Chet served an undercooked apple pie and was eliminated from the competition. However, he defends the judges' comments which heated up the kitchen's atmosphere, and later walked out of the kitchen with dissatisfaction.

- Round winner: Chef Ploy
- Bottom three: Keng, Jib and Chet
- Eliminated: Chef Chet

=== Episode 6 ===
Original Airdate: Sunday, 23 March 2025

Team Challenge 1: For this week's team challenge, all chefs are split into 2 teams. They will be cooking in the concept of sour dishes from the main ingredient: lime powder. It must include 2 savory dishes and 2 desserts per team. Since Chef Ploy wins the previous week's invention test and Chef Toei placed second, they are the team captains for this challenge. As the winner, Chef Ploy gets to choose her teammates first.

Team Captain	Members
Ploy	Ged, Zetrong, Jareuk, Tien, Lookchan and Kerr
Toei	Quest, Keng, Jib, Man and First

The guest judges today are 100 food merchants across Thailand, partially from The Restaurant War Thailand. In total, each team will need to make 416 dishes, and the judges will be tasting each team's dishes as well. They will have 60 minutes to prepare the dishes, and once the timer is up, the guest judges will enter immediately to come taste the dishes. They will have 40 minutes to serve all of their dishes.

- Preparation time: 60 minutes (1 hour)
- Service time: 40 minutes

Once the round is over, each guest judge have 3 coupons to vote for their favorite dishes. As a result, Blue team won Red team with a score of 158 to 142.

- Winning team: Blue team

Pressure Test 2: From the previous team challenge, Red team lost the round and all members must compete in this pressure test. The guest chef for this round is Chef Art Suphamongkhon, a Thai chef known for his western cuisine, the first chef to introduce the concept of Chef's Table in Thailand, a Top Chef Thailand judge and a head chef in The Restaurant War Thailand. The contestants will be replicating Chef Art's signature dish, which is "Crispy bread-scaled sea bass with rose bell pepper garlic sauce", which consists of 5 components: sea bass with crispy bread (layered in fish scale pattern), Thai seafood chili lime mousse filling, rose bell pepper garlic sauce, garnish vegetables (in a pentagonal prism shape), and herb crust. Chefs will have 60 minutes to study and cook this dish.

- Time: 60 minutes (1 hour)

After the judges have tasted all dishes, Chef Jareuk and Chef Ged's dishes contained raw sea bass, which makes them the bottom entries for this round. However, instead of both of them being eliminated, they will be battling 1v1 next week to determine who will be leaving the competition.

- Two bottom-most dishes: Chef Jareuk and Chef Ged

=== Episode 7 ===
Original Airdate: Sunday, 30 March 2025

One-on-One Battle: With Chef Ged and Chef Jareuk's bottom entries in the previous episode, they must compete 1v1 to determine who will qualify to the next round. In this round, both chefs will be battling in series of main ingredients, where each ingredient will appear in different times while cooking. They are also given a mystery box that are ingredients limited for them to use for all 3 dishes. The inside of the mystery box includes wolffia (swamp algae), tomato, pumpkin, bitter melon, brussels sprout, baby carrot, parmesan cheese, chocolate, kiwi, almond, puff pastry, red beans, and pandan leaves.

The first main ingredient is beef tongue, and they initially have 40 minutes to cook a dish out of it. However, in the last 10 minutes, they faced another main ingredient of chicken gizzard, and have an additional 15 minutes to cook both dishes (in total, 25 minutes left on the clock). While both chefs are concentrating on their two dishes, they were announced the third and last main ingredient to cook in the last 15 minutes of the timer, and that is pomegranate; they must create a dessert dish in addition to the past 2 dishes. The judges added 10 minutes to the clock (from initially 15 minutes left, making it 25 minutes for dessert). In total, both chefs have 65 minutes to cook 3 dishes.

- Total time: 65 minutes

As a result, Chef Ged won the first dish, and the second dish was a tie. The third dish also gains victory for Chef Ged, making her qualified to the next round while sadly eliminate Chef Jareuk.

- Battle winner: Chef Ged
- Eliminated: Chef Jareuk

Invention Test 4: In this round, the remaining 12 contestants will be cooking a dish with the first main ingredient: peppercorn. For the second main ingredient that they must cook with peppercorn, they must rely their fate in their fortune to select a mystery chest, which will be the main ingredient they must cook with. There are 12 chests, numbered from 1 to 12. After all chefs have selected their desired chest, it turns out that chests 1-4 are sets of premium ingredients, chests 5-8 are fruits suitable for desserts, and chests 9-12 are the most difficult ingredients to deal with. The assigned chests are as follows:

Premium ingredients			Fruits (usually for desserts)			Hardest to deal with		
Chest #	Contestants	Main ingredient	Chest #	Contestants	Main ingredient	Chest #	Contestants	Main ingredient
1	Chef First	Beef A5 Wagyu	5	Chef Jib	Papaya (ripe)	9	Chef Zetrong	Scorpions
2	Chef Man	Tiger Prawn	6	Chef Ploy	Mango (ripe)	10	Chef Quest	Fermented Fish
3	Chef Toei	Snowfish	7	Chef Kerr	Mixed Berries	11	Chef Ged	Beef Bone Marrow
4	Chef Keng	Abalone	8	Chef Lookchan	Banana (ripe)	12	Chef Tien	Pork Legs

Then, each contestant is given only 3 minutes to pick only 12 additional ingredients in the MasterChef supermarket. After the contestants have picked up their ingredients, they are told to switch baskets with the person in front of them. Eventually, Zetrong switches with Toei, Keng with Tien, Lookchan with Kerr, Ploy with First, Ged with Quest, and Man with Jib. With their friend's basket and the two main ingredients, they must create a dish to their best ability in 60 minutes.

- Time: 60 minutes (1 hour)

As a result, Chef Tien got the best dish, Chef Ged in second. On the other hand, with very limited ingredients left to use with fermented fish, Chef Quest was sadly eliminated.

- Round winner: Chef Tien
- Bottom three: Jib, Zetrong and Quest
- Eliminated: Chef Quest

=== Episode 8 ===
Original Airdate: Sunday, 6 April 2025

Mystery Box 4: The episode start off with an appearance of Sandy Yanisa, an artist under Heliconia Music, performing her debut song. The song lyrics included 10 different dessert menus, which is eventually this week's Mystery Box challenge: desserts. The lyrics mentioned banoffee, brownie, bingsu, cookie, croissant, choux cream, muffin, macaron, waffle, and honey toast. The contestants must choose at least 1 of the 10 mentioned desserts and create a signature out of it. They have 60 minutes in this round.

- Time: 60 minutes (1 hour)

While contestants are cooking, Chef Pom Kwantip told everyone to stop and surprised with a special main ingredient: Suki sauce. The contestants must use this sauce in at least one element of their dessert dish. After the round is over, Chef Ploy got the best dish and granted herself an immunity.

- Three best dishes: Keng, Ploy and Tien
- Round winner: Chef Ploy

Invention Test 5: Traditional Thai Curry

In this round, the remaining contestants must remake a random Thai curry and must use all correct spices in their assigned curry whilst putting in their creativity to the professional level. They must draw a random curry to create a dish from a gashapon machine, and the final selections are:

Contestant	Selected Thai Curry	Contestant	Selected Thai Curry
Chef Man	So-Ros Curry	Chef Keng	Singhon Curry
Chef Lookchan	Nang Loy Curry	Chef Jib	Turmeric Curry
Chef Zetrong	Noppagao Curry	Chef Tien	Pork Curry
Chef Kerr	Mussamun Curry	Chef Ged	Cassia Leaves Curry
Chef First	Thepo Curry	Chef Toei	Bumbai Curry

Before the round begins, Chef Ploy (winner of last round) have the opportunity to give the curry recipe specifically to 3 chefs. She decides to give them to Tien, Ged, and Zetrong. Each contestant have 60 minutes to create the best creation of their drawn traditional Thai curry dish.

- Time: 60 minutes (1 hour)

As a result, Chef Zetrong and Chef Tien scored the highest with equal points, making them co-winners of this round. Unfortunately, with no recipe and an extremely rare Thai curry drawn, Chef Man scored the least and was eliminated.

- Round winner: Chef Zetrong and Chef Tien
- Bottom three: Man, Ged and Kerr
- Eliminated: Chef Man

=== Episode 9: Vote Back (Part 1/2) ===
Original Airdate: Sunday, 20 April 2025

Mystery Box 5: In this round, the 10 remaining contestants must create a deep-fried, crispy dish with limited ingredients including pork belly, tiny crabs (pukatoy), Japanese tofu, shishamo, Chinese yellow noodles, jasmine rice, taro, banana, sesbania, Japanese scallion, eggplant, and vegetable oil. Each contestant have 60 minutes to create a dish, and they are told that 2 people will be eliminated from this round.

- Time: 60 minutes (1 hour)

As a result, Chef Keng wins the round, Chef Ged in second. Meanwhile, Chef Lookchan and Chef Zetrong were selected as the bottom two dishes.

- Two best dishes: Chef Ged and Chef Keng
- Round winner: Chef Keng
- Bottom three: Tien, Lookchan and Zetrong
- Two bottom-most dishes: Chef Lookchan and Chef Zetrong

Before eliminating both of them, the judges give Chef Keng the chance to save one contestant from elimination. In the end, he chose to save Chef Lookchan while eliminate Chef Zetrong.

- Eliminated: Chef Zetrong

Before Zetrong walks out, the judges give him a second chance opportunity for not just him, but alongside the other 8 eliminated contestants back in the kitchen.

Vote Back (Reinstation Challenge): In this series of challenges, the show has invited Zetrong and the other 8 eliminated contestants back to compete for a second chance opportunity, and only one chef will be chosen to return. The first round is in the theme of Cocktail Party, where the 9 chefs must make their cocktail dish creation for more than 100 guests, 150 cups total, with the main ingredient: chicken. Each cup must be no less than 30 grams, and is graded by taste and creativity. They will be serving 100 guests who are supercar lovers, the judges, and the 9 contestants who are still in the competition at Siloo'et House in Nonthaburi. In total, each contestant have 60 minutes to prepare each on their own and 40 minutes to set up after arrival.

- Preparation time: 60 minutes (1 hour)
- Set up time: 40 minutes

The results of the challenge was announced in Episode 10, in which Chef Jareuk wins with 31 votes. Alongside the other following three highest scorers, Zetrong, Quest, and Max, they will be competing in the second round to determine the one chef returning to the competition. Meaning, the other 5 contestants that did not win has concluded their journey in this season.

- Four highest scorers: Jareuk, Zetrong, Quest and Max

=== Episode 10: Vote Back (Part 2/2) ===
Original Airdate: Sunday, 27 April 2025

Bidding Battle (Vote Back): In this challenge, the four remaining chefs must compete for the main ingredient that they each want to cook with. There are four ingredients and each will appear one by one, where the difficulty will increase each time. Every main ingredient comes with Sriracha sauce, which is the other main ingredient that they must combine with in their dish. The chefs must compete for the main ingredient they want in exchange of their cooking time, and whoever auctions with the least cooking time will granted themselves the desired main ingredient. The starting time for auction is 75 minutes. However, whoever is the last with no ingredients yet will have to cook with the last mystery ingredient, and they have only 30 minutes for their dish. The final selections are the following:

Mystery Ingredient			Chef that auctioned	Bidding time
No.	Main ingredient 1	Main ingredient 2	Chef that auctioned	Bidding time
1	Pig ears	Sriracha sauce	Chef Quest	40 minutes
2	Cow tails (with attached fur)	Sriracha sauce	Chef Jareuk	40 minutes
3	Dried buffalo skin	Sriracha sauce	Chef Zetrong	40 minutes
4	Grass jelly	Sriracha sauce	Chef Max	30 minutes

In the end, Chef Quest wins the challenge and granted the ticket to return as a contestant in this season. Sadly, the other 3 chefs ended their journey in this season.

- Returned to the competition: Chef Quest

Invention Test 6: In this round, Chef Quest and the 9 remaining contestants must create a dish with a mystery ingredient, and they must guess it with nonverbal communication. As the returning contestant from the Vote Back round, Chef Quest got the honor to perform nonverbal communication for the 9 contestants to guess what the main ingredient is; with that said, Chef Quest is the only one who knew what it is. The contestants have in total of 45 minutes to guess the ingredient, and the amount of time left after correctly guessing the ingredient will be everyone's cooking time. As a result, the main ingredient is enoki mushrooms and they have 43 minutes remaining to create a dish out of it.

- Time: 43 minutes

After the round is over, Chef Kerr and Chef Tien got the best dishes. Unfortunately, Chef Jib scored the least and was eliminated from the competition.

- Round winners: Chef Kerr and Chef Tien
- Bottom three: Keng, Jib and Ploy
- Eliminated: Chef Jib

=== Episode 11 ===
Original Airdate: Sunday, 4 May 2025

Mystery Box 6: In this last Mystery Box of the season, the 9 remaining chefs are given 35 different ingredients to cook with, including every components from vegetables and fruits to protein, carbohydrates, and seasonings. However, each ingredient came in a one-bite portion, and there will be no additional ingredients given to them. They must only use what is given to create a dish to the best of their ability, given 60 minutes to cook them. Winner of this round will grant themselves an immunity for the week.

- Time: 60 minutes (1 hour)

As a result, Chef First presented the best dish and granted himself an immunity.

- Three best dishes: Ged, First and Lookchan
- Round winner: Chef First

Invention Test 7: MasterChef Café

In this round, the 8 contestants must compete for their desired dessert and drink set to create a professional level café meal. For the first 5 sets, the chefs are given a sign with their names, and they have to raise their sign as fast as they can for the set they want to cook with in hopes of receiving it. If there is a tie, the judges made the chefs do a tiebreaker. In the last 3 sets however, the judges made the remaining contestants do series of physical activities to compete for their desired café sets. The first set among that is by a 20 push-ups challenge, and the second set is by a 20 spinning crickets challenge. The chef that didn't grant themselves any sets in prior must cook with the third and last set, which is also considered the most difficult. The final selections are the following:

Café Sets			Contestant
No.	Dessert	Drink	Contestant
1	Egg tarts	Boba milk tea	Chef Ged
2	Crêpe cake	Pink milk	Chef Keng
3	Coconut cake	Cocoa drink	Chef Toei
4	Cookies	Coffee	Chef Kerr
5	Panna cotta	Green tea	Chef Tien
6	Pancake	Rose tea	Chef Ploy
7	Toast with pandan custard	Teh tarik	Chef Lookchan
8	Thai custard pudding	Milk smoothie	Chef Quest

- Time: 60 minutes (1 hour)

As a result, Chef Quest presented the best café set, Chef Kerr in second. Unfortunately, Chef Keng's misinterpretation of pink milk cost him the elimination.

- Round winner: Chef Quest
- Bottom three: Ged, Keng and Lookchan
- Eliminated: Chef Keng

=== Episode 12 ===
Original Airdate: Sunday, 11 May 2025

Pressure Test 3: This round is the last round before the chefs enter the semi-finals. In this round, the judges welcomed Chef Willment Leong, a culinary leader based on Thailand who is the continental director for Asia, a head chef in Hell's Kitchen Thailand, as well as a judge in Top Chef Thailand. Chef Willment have prepared a mystery dish, in which is his signature, that includes fish sauce as the main ingredient. It is a mystery since the contestants are given nothing but a sample plate to taste, visualize, and observe as much as they can to fully replicate Chef Willment's dish; with that said, neither recipe nor list of ingredients are given. In 60 minutes, the contestants must replicate the dish to the best of their ability with accuracy in visuals, ingredients used, and the taste of the overall dish.

- Time: 60 minutes (1 hour)

After the time is over, Chef Willment then tells the correct components to his dish. The dish includes 5 compoments: pan-seared black grouper, black grouper flan (similar to mousse), Asian-style orange bouillabaisse sauce, hollandaise sauce, on top with frisée and rocket lettuce salad tossed in orange citrus dressing. In this dish, it is revealed that Chef Willment only uses fish sauce as the seasoning for saltiness, and not a single grain of salt is used. As a result, Chef Quest did the closest to the original and was the first to qualify to the semi-final round. On the other hand, the bottom three dishes have a very close score that the judges made them battle in another quick round to determine who is going home. With that said, contestants who are not in the bottom entries are qualified to the semi-final round alongside Chef Quest.

- Round Winner: Chef Quest
- Bottom three: Tien, Toei and Lookchan

Quick Signature Dish: As the bottom three dishes from the last round, Tien, Toei and Lookchan have to create a signature dish out of the main ingredient, sea bass, in just 20 minutes that is given.

- Time: 20 minutes

As a result, Chef Tien won the overall dish taste, while Chef Toei won both creativity and the main ingredient. Meaning, Chef Lookchan is unfortunately sent home in this round.

- Eliminated: Chef Lookchan

Right after the round is over, the judges invite the remaining 7 contestants to visit "The Man That Rescues Dogs" foundation, which introduces the chefs to the organization and the theme of this season's semi-final round: gala dinner for charity.

=== Episode 13: Semi-Final ===
Original Airdate: Sunday, 18 May 2025

Gala Dinner for Charity: In the semi-final round, the 7 chefs will each be responsible for one course in the gala dinner--in total of 7 courses for 100 guests. In the previous episode, the contestants have drawn randomly the course they are responsible for, alongside the main ingredient that goes with it. The final selections are the following (in order):

Course			Contestant
No.	Type of Course	Main Ingredient	Contestant
1	Appetizer	Squid	Chef Ged
2	Appetizer	Boar	Chef Ploy
3	Soup	Clams	Chef Tien
4	Pre-Main Course	Snowfish	Chef Toei
5	Main Course	Tiger prawns	Chef Kerr
6	Main Course	Beef ribs	Chef First
7	Dessert	Mayongchid	Chef Quest

Each chef have a budget of 12,000 baht (or around $370 USD) to buy all the ingredients necessary to fulfill their dish for 100 guests, excluding the main ingredient that is already given. They must plan everything accordingly in every component of their dish (which will be recorded prior to the competition for guests to acknowledge), as well as plating and the flow of flavors being passed on from each course. The 100 guest judges consists of the majority being charity donors, sponsors, and the judges. In addition, this round welcomes Chef Ton Thitid, the owner of Le Du that ranked first in Asia's 50 Best Restaurant in 2023, as well as a judge in Top Chef Thailand, to be the special guest in this gala dinner.

- Special Guest Judge: Chef Ton Thitid Tassanakajohn

The contestants are each given exactly 4 hours to prepare their dishes to the guests, with Chef Ged, who has the first course, getting the honor to start first. Then, at 20-minute intervals, the timer will start for the next course to begin. After that, each contestant is given another 1 hour to serve their dishes one by one, in which they have to split part of their time to present their dishes on stage for the guests.

- Prepararion time: 4 hours
- Service time: 1 hour

Overall, the judges will look forward to the taste, creativity, presentation, the use of main ingredient, and time management to determine the overall best performers who will qualify to the grand finale. If they fail to serve all 100 dishes, they will immediately lose points from this round.

The results were announced on Episode 14, and it turns out that Chef Quest had the best overall performance and was the first to qualify to the grand finale. Hence, Chefs Ged, Toei, Tien, and Ploy (in order by scores) are also qualified to the final round. Sadly, Chef First and Chef Kerr are disqualified, partially because they were unable to serve all dishes on time.

- Round winner: Chef Quest
- Eliminated: Chef Kerr and Chef First
- Grand Finalists: Quest, Ged, Toei, Tien and Ploy

=== Episode 14-15: Grand Finale ===
Original Airdate: Sunday, 25 May & 1 June 2025

This season's grand finale is different from other seasons. Instead of giving time for the finalists to plan out and present their 3 signature courses, the competition to find the winner is split into 4 rounds. In each round, the finalist that scores the least will be disqualified from competing the upcoming rounds and eventually end their journey in this season.

Round 1: Time Management

In the first round, all 5 finalists must create a professional level menu out of beef shank, which comes in an entire huge leg that aren't cut into pieces for the chefs to cook. Since this round is testing their time management skills, they only have 50 minutes to prepare 3 dishes of their beef shank menu (which should be tender when the dishes are served).

Furthermore, the judges surprised the finalists during the round with another main ingredient: durian flavored coconut condensed milk. They must use this ingredient to create another dessert menu in the remaining 25 minutes alongside their main course, adding another 3 dishes in this round.

- Total time: 50 minutes
- Time for dessert: 25 minutes

The judges use 3 main criteria to score each dish: taste, creativity, and the use of main ingredients. After the judges have tasted all five dishes, Chef Tien receives the highest score, Chef Ged in second, then Chef Ploy in third. With very precise scoring of the remaining two finalists, Chef Toei wins 2 out of the 3 criteria, resulting in Chef Quest being the first chef eliminated.

- Round winner: Chef Tien
- Eliminated: Chef Quest

Round 2: Adding Value

In the second round, the remaining 4 finalists must elevate the main ingredient, chicken neck, that costs 30 baht (or around $1 USD) per kilogram to a professional, 500 baht worthy dish. They will have 50 minutes to prepare 3 dishes for the judges.

- Time: 50 minutes

After the judges have tasted all dishes, Chef Tien scores the highest once again. However, while the judges are tasting each chef's dishes, Chef Ploy bravely confessed the judges that she will not be serving her dish because the chicken neck in her dish is still raw. The judges highly appreciate her decision, and as a result, Chef Ploy is sadly eliminated from this round.

- Round winner: Chef Tien
- Eliminated: Chef Ploy

Round 3: Knowledge in Ingredients

In the third round, the remaining 3 chefs must cook with the main ingredient: shirako (milt). They will have just 50 minutes to create a menu and serve 3 dishes for 3 judges, testing their problem solving skills and the knowledge of this ingredient.

- Time: 50 minutes

As a result, Chef Toei scores the highest in this round. But with everyone's excellent job presenting their dishes, the judges decided to not have anyone eliminated from this round.

- Round winner: Chef Toei
- Eliminated: none

Round 4: The Final Dish

For their final dish in this season, the 3 finalists get to cook with truffles, offering them all the chance to create their best signature dish that will conclude their journey in this season. They all get 60 minutes to prepare 3 dishes, one for each judge. The person with the best presentation in this round will be crowned the winner of MasterChef The Professionals Thailand, granted with MasterChef trophy and 1,000,000 baht.

- Time: 60 minutes (1 hour)

After the judges tasted all three dishes, Chef Tien's dish contains undercooked chicken which resulted him being in third place overall. With the judges' very careful and detailed scoring, it was finally announced that Chef Toei is the winner of this season while Chef Ged comes in second, respectively.

- Third place: Chef Tien
- Runner-Up: Chef Ged

Winner of MasterChef The Professionals Thailand: Chef Toei Saharat Taengthai

== Awards ==
Shortly after the season concluded, they won a Maya TV Awards grand prize in October 2025 and became the national winner of Asian Academy Creative Awards 2025 for Best Adaptation of an Existing Format (Non-Scripted). Although they didn't win the AACA grand prize, it marks as another major accomplishment for MasterChef Thailand franchise as the second season to be nominated in this category, following Junior Season 1 in 2019.

Later in 2026, the show was nominated in the 5th Pantip Television Awards and the 17th Nataraj Awards, becoming the MasterChef Thailand series with the most award nomination in its history today.
