= Hong Kong (disambiguation) =

Hong Kong is a Special Administrative Region of the People's Republic of China from 1997, and was formerly part of the British Empire and Commonwealth of Nations.

Hong Kong may also refer to:

== Arts and entertainment ==
- Hong Kong (album), a 1994 album by Jean Michel Jarre
- Hong Kong (film), a 1952 American film
- Hong Kong (TV series), a 1960–1961 American series
- "Hong Kong" (The Apprentice), a 2026 television episode
- "Hong Kong" (song), a 2026 song by The Weeknd
- The Hong Kong, an American rock band
- "Hong Kong", a song by Gorillaz from D-Sides
- "Hong Kong", a song by Teresa Teng from Roman Shugi

== Places ==
- Hong Kong Island, an island forming part of the Hong Kong special administrative region
- 3297 Hong Kong, a main-belt asteroid

== Transportation ==
- HMS Hong Kong (K585) or HMS Tobago (K585), a British Royal Navy frigate
- Hong Kong (Area Control Centre), an air traffic control center
- Air Hong Kong, an all-cargo airline founded in 1986
- Hong Kong Airlines, an airline based in Hong Kong founded in 2006
- Hong Kong Airways, an airline based in British Hong Kong 1947–1959
- Hong Kong station, a terminus on the Hong Kong Mass Transit Railway system

== See also ==
- British Hong Kong, the territory under British administration from 1841 to 1997
- Hong Kong people
- Hong Kong Phooey, an American animated television series produced by Hanna-Barbera Productions
- Hong Kong flu, a flu pandemic of 1968 and 1969
- Hong Kong 97 (disambiguation)
- 2019–20 Hong Kong protests
- 2014 Hong Kong protests
- HK (disambiguation)
- Kong Hong
