= Willment Leong =

Singaporean chef

- Born: Leong Sai-Onn; October 13, 1971 (age 54); Singapore
- Spouse: Bencharat Prapluettrakul

Willment Leong Sai-Onn (Chinese: 梁世安; pinyin: Liáng shì'ān; Jyutping: loeng4 sai3 on1; Thai: วิลเมนต์ ลีออง; born October 13, 1971) is a Singaporean chef residing and working in Thailand. He serves as the Continental Director for Asia and an executive board member of Worldchefs for the term 2022–2026. He is the founder of the Thailand Culinary Academy and participates as a board member and host in several cooking competition shows. He was also a partner and owner of the restaurant COAL Bistro before he left at the end of 2025.

== Early life ==
Willment was born on October 13, 1971 in Singapore, into a poor family. His father sold fruit and his mother was a homemaker. He has four siblings. He only completed schooling up to Grade 9. At age 16, he left home and began working in restaurant kitchens, believing that working in cooking would always provide a way to survive. He also briefly studied culinary arts for nine months before dropping out. He later worked as a dishwasher at the Raffles Hotel, then was promoted to assistant chef, before leaving to start a bakery. Unfortunately, during the Asian financial crisis in 1997, his bakery business collapsed with debts of over ten million baht. Distressed, he once nearly attempted suicide by walking into the sea, but an older man intervened and stopped him.

== Career ==
After his bakery venture failed, Willment returned to work at Raffles Hotel (this time at a branch in Cambodia). Later he moved to Thailand to work in the restaurant business there.

In 2010, he founded the Thailand Culinary Academy to help develop professional Thai chefs and support them in global competitions.

He was also a partner and owner of the restaurant COAL Bistro before he left at the end of 2025.

== Filmography ==
Year	Show	Role	Season and Episode
2013	Junior MasterChef Thailand	Guest Judge	S1 (Only one)
2017	Top Chef Thailand	Head Judge	Season 1
2018 – 2019	Top Chef Thailand	Head Judge	Season 2
2019 – 2020	Top Chef Thailand	Head Judge	Season 3
2023	Top Chef Thailand	Head Judge	Season 4
2024	Hell's Kitchen Thailand Season 1	Judge	Season 1
2024	The Restaurant War Thailand	Head teacher	Season 1
2025	MasterChef The Professionals Thailand	Guest judge	Season 1 EP. 12
2025	The Restaurant War Thailand	Head teacher	Season 2
2025	Hell's Kitchen Thailand Season 2	Judge	Season 2
2026	The Restaurant War Street King Thailand	Head teacher	Season 3
