= Hunter-killer =

Hunter-killer may refer to:

== Military terminology ==
- Hunter-killer team, a team that separates the tasks of "hunting" and "killing" to two or more individuals
- Hunter-killer armored-vehicle team, scout vehicles and tanks operating in concert as "hunters" and "killers"
- Hunter-killer sight, a vehicle commander's sight, independent of the gunner's sight
- Attack submarine or hunter-killer submarine
- USAF Hunter-Killer program developing unmanned combat air vehicles
- Hunter-killer Group, World War II formation of Allied warships usually including an escort carrier (CVE), tasked with locating and sinking enemy submarines

== Other ==
- Hunter Killer (film), a 2018 film
- Hunter Killer (video game), a 1989 video game
- Hunter-Killer (comics), a comic book series
- 688(I) Hunter/Killer, 1997 submarine simulator game developed by Sonalysts Inc. and published by Electronic Arts
