= The Restaurant War Thailand =

- The Restaurant War Thailand poster season 1
- Also known as: Battle of the Fiery Vendors
- Thai: ศึกพ่อค้าซ่าแม่ค้าแซ่บ
- Genre: Reality competition Cooking show
- Created by: Kitikorn Penrote; Heliconia H-Group
- Presented by: Sunya Thadathanawong
- Starring: Thitid Tassanakajohn; Pichaya Soontornyanakij; Suphamongkhon Supapipat
- Judges: Willment Leong
- Narrated by: Piya Vimuktayon
- Country of origin: Thailand
- Original language: Thai
- No. of seasons: 3
- No. of episodes: 36

Production
- Running time: 110 minutes
- Production company: Heliconia H-Group

Original release
- Network: Channel 7
- Release: September 22, 2024 – September 6, 2026

The Restaurant War Thailand (Thai: เดอะ เรสเตอรองต์ วอร์ ประเทศไทย) is a Thai reality television show featuring a team cooking competition between street food vendors. It is hosted by Sunya Thadathanawong, with Chef Willment Leong serving as the Head Teacher and Chef Ton Thitid Tassanakajohn, Chef Pam Pichaya Soontornyanakij and Chef Art Suphamongkhon Supapipat serving as the Head Chef Trainers. The show was produced by Heliconia H-Group. It premiered on September 22, 2024. The second season premiered on June 22, 2025. For the third season, the title was changed to Restaurant War Street King Thailand, which premiered on June 21, 2026.

== Former names ==
- The Restaurant War Thailand (Thai: เดอะ เรสเตอรองต์ วอร์ ประเทศไทย), seasons 1–2
- Restaurant War Street King Thailand (Thai: เรสเตอรองต์ วอร์ สตรีตคิง ประเทศไทย), season 3–present

== International broadcast ==
In 2026, the series was rebranded as Restaurant War Street King Thailand for international distribution. The third season became available on Netflix in more than 190 countries, marking the programme's first worldwide release outside Thailand.

== Format ==
It is a reality cooking competition show conceived and produced by Heliconia H Group. The competition features street food vendors, market traders, and small restaurant owners who are divided into three teams. The head teacher serves as the main judge, assisted by a head chef trainer for each team.

=== Chef Trainer's color symbols ===
Team Chef Ton (season 1)
Team Chef Ton
Team Chef Pam
Team Chef Art

=== Audition rounds ===
This round will be divided into two stages:

- Stages 1: Contestants must dress, apply makeup, style their hair, create a character, and present their regular menu item in a captivating manner within 30 seconds for initial evaluation by the Head Teacher and Head Chef Trainers.
- Stages 2: Contestants must take a menu item from their own restaurant and recreate it as a more unique and creative dish within 60 minutes. They will then present this new dish to the head chefs for team selection. The selection process is as follows:
  - If no head chef selects a contestant, they will be eliminated.
  - If one head chef selects a contestant, the contestant will join that head chef's team.
  - If multiple head chefs select a contestant, the contestant will have the right to choose which head chef's team to join. Each team member will receive an apron corresponding to their team's color. Each head chef may have a maximum of six team members.

For Season 2, teams were determined by a draw.

In Season 3, contestants will have 60 minutes to create a Signature Menu, by either using a regular dish from their restaurant or utilizing their skills to create a new one. The selection process will be the same as in Season 1, but this season, the head teacher will give three high-performing contestants who weren't initially selected another chance. the head teacher will personally select one person for each team.

=== Competition rounds ===
==== Individual Challenge ====
Contestants must create a dish based on a given prompt within the allotted time, usually 60 minutes. Each head chef will select two dishes from their team. These six dishes will be judged by the headmaster and two guest judges to determine the best dish. Dishes that exhibit creativity will be given special consideration. The winner of the best dish will receive special privileges in the next challenge.

In Season 3, the individual rounds were judged by the head chef trainer via blind tasting.

==== Restaurant War ====
Each team must prepare a dish according to a specified nationality and style, which will be judged by a panel of 20 judges. The judges will vote to select the winning team. Three primary ingredients will be provided, and the winning team from the Individual Challenge will have the privilege of selecting these ingredients for all three teams. Each team will be allotted 60 minutes to consult with their head chef mentor regarding the menu and kitchen operations. Following the consultation, each team will have 90 minutes to prepare their dish (after season one episode 9, the time will be only 60 minutes.). The head chef mentors will observe their teams via a closed-circuit television system from a control room. Head chefs will communicate with team members by pressing a button corresponding to the member's name. During these communications, other team members must pause their tasks, but the timer will keep running. If the headmaster deems that the three teams are experiencing significant difficulties and the head chef mentors are unable to maintain control, the headmaster may grant the head chef mentors limited permission to assist their teams directly.

==== Challenge on Street ====
This round was introduced in Season 3 and is a solo competition. Contestants must sell food at a street market, with the location varying in each episode. They have 90 minutes to prepare their food and 90 minutes to sell it. Contestants must create their own menu, set their prices, and plan their strategies. The contestant who earns the least money is eliminated.

The winner of the Individual Challenge advances directly to the next round, earning their team a 10-minute head start to open their stall, the opportunity to open a shop in the middle, or a VVIP status with 1,500 baht to spend on food.

==== Creative Cooking challenge ====
In this challenge, contestant must use their creativity to cook. Dishes must be made distinctive, while keeping their original flavors intact.

==== The Ultimate Chef Battle ====
In this round, the head chefs must choose two people their teams to go head-to-head with professional chefs.

==== Challenge of Taste ====
This round is a solo competition. In this challenge, judges evaluating solely on flavor will taste and select four outstanding dishes. Then, the head chef trainers will determine the best dish through a blind tasting. Additionally, the head chefs must leave during the competition.

==== Challenge of the Steal ====
In this round, the head chef trainer with the fewest members can challenge another trainer who has more members. If they win, they get to steal a member from the losing trainer.

==== Elimination ====
After the judges evaluate all three dishes, a letter will be sent to each team's room announcing the results of the Restaurant War round. The winning team will not have any team members eliminated that week. The head chefs of the two losing teams must each nominate two team members for evaluation by the headmaster and the winning team's head chef. The winning team's head chef will have the option to select one of these nominated contestants to join their team. However, each head chef may only exercise this privilege once per season. After making their decision, the headmaster will determine which contestant will be eliminated and return their apron.

In Season 2, the losing teams in the Restaurant War round will compete in the Individual round. Whoever makes the worst dish and makes the most mistakes will be eliminated from the competition.

== Season 1 overview ==
The Restaurant War Thailand
- Season 1
- No. of episodes: 12

Release
- Original network: Channel 7
- Original release: September 22 – December 15, 2024

=== Contestants ===
(ages stated are at start of filming)

Contestant	Age	Food product	Team		Place
Farn	26	Made-to-order dishes	Chef Ton		Winner (December 15)
Nut	26	Khao kaeng	Chef Ton	Chef Pam	Runner-up (December 15)
BM	34	Larb Ped	Chef Art		Runner-up (December 15)
Yotus	40	Khao kaeng	Chef Pam		Runner-up (December 15)
Rakaoey	32	Steamed curry	Chef Pam		Eliminated in EP. 11 (December 8)
Nan	36	Thai mixed salad	Chef Pam		Eliminated in EP. 11 (December 8)
Grovimmbom	45	Grilled meat	Chef Ton		Eliminated in EP. 11 (December 8)
Visa	51	Cafeteria food	Chef Art		Eliminated in EP. 11 (December 8)
Poo	37	Chinese noodles	Chef Art	Chef Ton	Eliminated in EP. 10 (December 1)
Ning	28	Healthy food	Chef Ton		Eliminated in EP. 10 (December 1); Returned in EP. 8 (November 17); Withdrawn in EP.7 (November 10); Withdrawn in EP.3 (Individual Challenge, October 6)
Pan	49	Pad thai	Chef Art		Returned and eliminated in EP. 10 (December 2); Eliminated in EP. 9 (November 24)
Foofoo	43	Green papaya salad	Chef Art		Eliminated in EP. 8 (November 17)
Ton	50	Chicken feet spicy soup	Chef Ton		Eliminated in EP. 7 (November 10)
Kuaod	29	Green papaya salad	Chef Pam		Eliminated in EP. 6 (October 27)
Noi	65	Pad thai	Chef Pam		Eliminated in EP. 5 (October 20)
M	37	Phat kaphrao	Chef Art		Eliminated in EP. 4 (October 13)
Auim	49	Chinese noodles zab gang	Chef Pam		Eliminated in EP. 3 (October 6)
Bassy	34	Made-to-order dishes	Chef Ton		Eliminated in EP. 2 (September 29)

=== Contestant progress ===
Place	Contestant	Episodes																			
Place	Contestant	2		3		4		5		6		7		8		9		10		11	12
1	Farn	HIGH	IN	IN	LOW	HIGH	IN	HIGH	IN	HIGH	WIN	HIGH	IN	WIN	IN	IN	WIN	IN	IN	IN	WINNER
2	Nut	HIGH	IN	WIN	IN	HIGH	IN	IN	IN	WIN	WIN	HIGH	TF	HIGH	WIN	WIN	IN	WIN	WIN	IN	RUNNER-UP
2	BM	IN	WIN	IN	WIN	HIGH	IN	HIGH	WIN	HIGH	IN	HIGH	IN	HIGH	IN	HIGH	IN	IN	LOW	IN	RUNNER-UP
2	Yotus	HIGH	IN	IN	IN	WIN	WIN	HIGH	IN	HIGH	IN	HIGH	WIN	HIGH	WIN	IN	IN	WIN	WIN	IN	RUNNER-UP
5	Rakaoey	IN	IN	IN	IN	HIGH	WIN	IN	IN	IN	IN	IN	WIN	IN	WIN	HIGH	LOW	WIN	WIN	OUT	
5	Nan	IN	IN	IN	IN	IN	WIN	IN	LOW	HIGH	LOW	HIGH	WIN	IN	WIN	IN	LOW	WIN	WIN	OUT	
5	Grovimmbom	IN	IN	IN	IN	IN	IN	HIGH	IN	IN	WIN	IN	IN	IN	IN	HIGH	WIN	IN	LOW	OUT	
5	Visa	HIGH	WIN	HIGH	WIN	IN	IN	IN	WIN	HIGH	IN	WIN	IN	IN	IN	IN	LOW	IN	LOW	OUT	
9	Poo	IN	WIN	IN	WIN	IN	IN	IN	WIN	IN	TF	IN	LOW	HIGH	LOW	HIGH	WIN	IN	OUT		
10	Ning	IN	IN	WD	LOW	IN	LOW	IN	LOW	IN	WIN	WD		IN	LOW	IN	WIN	IN	OUT		
10	Pan	IN	WIN	HIGH	WIN	IN	LOW	WIN	WIN	IN	IN	IN	IN	HIGH	LOW	HIGH	OUT	RET	OUT		
12	Foofoo	WIN	WIN	IN	WIN	IN	IN	IN	WIN	IN	LOW	IN	LOW	IN	OUT						
13	Ton	IN	LOW	HIGH	IN	IN	LOW	IN	LOW	IN	WIN	IN	OUT								
14	Kuaod	IN	IN	IN	IN	IN	WIN	HIGH	IN	IN	OUT										
15	Noi	HIGH	LOW	HIGH	LOW	IN	WIN	IN	OUT												
16	M	IN	WIN	IN	WIN	HIGH	OUT														
17	Auim	IN	LOW	HIGH	OUT																
18	Bassy	IN	OUT																		

(WINNER) The contestant won The Restaurant War.
(RUNNER-UP) The contestant was a Runner-Up.
(IN) The contestant advanced to the next round.
(WIN) The contestant won the Individual Challenge.
(HIGH) The contestant was nominated in the Individual Challenge but did not win the episode.
(WIN) The contestant won the Special Challenge.
(WIN) The contestant won the Restaurant War round.
(TF) The contestant was transferred to the team of the winning chef trainer.
(WD) The contestant was withdrawn from the competition but was returned to the competition as an assistant, ineligible to compete in the next round.
(RET) The contestant was originally eliminated but returned to the competition on their original team as an assistant, ineligible to compete in the next round.
(LOW) The contestant was at risk of elimination.
(OUT) The contestant, now an assistant, must leave the competition after the final Individual Challenge.
(OUT) The contestant was eliminated from the competition.

== Season 2 overview ==
The Restaurant War Thailand
- Season 2
- No. of episodes: 12

Release
- Original network: Channel 7, Netflix
- Original release: June 22 – September 7, 2025

=== Episodes ===
Episode	Native Title	First aired
1	ไม่ทันตั้งตัว	June 22, 2025
2	สตรีตฟูดไทยไปสเปน	June 29, 2025
3	ห้ามทิ้ง	July 6, 2025
4	กล้ามเน้น ๆ	July 13, 2025
5	หยุดตะโกน	July 20, 2025
6	พร้อมเสิร์ฟ พร้อมเซลฟี่	July 27, 2025
7	กลไกอาหารเยอรมัน	August 3, 2025
8	ไฟลต์ TG642 กรุงเทพฯ-โตเกียว	August 10, 2025
9	เริ่มนับถอยหลัง	August 17, 2025
10	การให้ที่ยิ่งใหญ่	August 24, 2025
11	ศึกประมูลเดือด	August 31, 2025
12	สนามสอบครั้งสุดท้าย	September 7, 2025

=== Contestants ===
(ages stated are at start of filming)

Contestant	Age	Food product	Team			Place
Bell	41	Own porridge shops	Chef Pam			Winner (September 7)
Off	39	Western food	Chef Art			First Runner-Up (September 7)
Nokky	45	Western food	Chef Art			Second Runner-up (September 7)
Patcha	38	Braised pork leg	Chef Pam	Chef Art	Chef Ton	Second Runner-up (September 7)
Yoklan	39	Thai home-style cooking	Chef Ton			Second Runner-up (September 7)
Wat	56	Made-to-order dishes	Chef Art			Eliminated in EP. 11 (August 31)
Modtanoy	25	Western food	Chef Ton			Eliminated in EP. 11 (August 31)
Fah	27	Own porridge shops	Chef Pam			Eliminated in EP. 11 (August 31)
Aomsin	27	Thai home-style cooking	Chef Ton			Eliminated in EP. 10 (August 24)
Toktak	39	Som Tam papaya salad	Chef Art			Eliminated in EP. 9 (August 17)
Noiinongz	34	Som Tam papaya salad	Chef Ton			Eliminated in EP. 8 (August 10)
Wi	54	Made-to-order dishes	Chef Pam			Eliminated in EP. 7 (August 3)
Siaoff	42	Chicken rice	Chef Ton			Eliminated in EP. 6 (July 27)
Su	62	Thai home-style cooking	Chef Art			Eliminated in EP. 5 (July 20)
Purn	43	Made-to-order dishes	Chef Pam			Eliminated in EP. 4 (July 13)
Dear	38	Desserts	Chef Ton			Withdraw in EP. 3 (July 6)
Pob	27	Western food	Chef Pam			Eliminated in EP. 2 (June 29)
Kuikik	33	Made-to-order dishes	Chef Art			Eliminated in EP. 1 (June 22)

=== Contestant progress ===
Place	Contestant	Episodes																			
Place	Contestant	1	2		3		4		5		6		7		8		9		10	11	12
1	Bell	IC	HIGH	IN	WIN	WIN	IN	IN	HIGH	LOW	IN	IN	HIGH	IN	WIN	LOW	HIGH	LOW	IN	IN	WINNER
2	Off	IC	IN	LOW	HIGH	LOW	HIGH	WIN	WIN	IN	HIGH	WIN	IN	WIN	IN	WIN	HIGH	IN	IN	IN	FIRST RUNNER-UP
3	Nokky	IC	WIN	IN	HIGH	IN	IN	WIN	IN	IN	WIN	WIN	HIGH	WIN	HIGH	WIN	HIGH	IN	IN	IN	SECOND RUNNER-UP
3	Patcha	IC	IN	IN	IN	WIN	IN	TF	IN	IN	IN	WIN	IN	WIN	IN	WIN	IN	TF	IN	IN	SECOND RUNNER-UP
3	Yoklan	WIN	HIGH	WIN	HIGH	IN	HIGH	IN	IN	WIN	HIGH	IN	HIGH	LOW	HIGH	IN	WIN	WIN	IN	IN	SECOND RUNNER-UP
6	Wat	IC	IN	IN	IN	IN	IN	WIN	HIGH	LOW	IN	WIN	WIN	WIN	HIGH	WIN	IN	IN	LOW	OUT	
6	Modtanoy	WIN	IN	WIN	IN	IN	IN	LOW	IN	WIN	IN	IN	HIGH	IN	HIGH	IN	IN	WIN	IN	OUT	
6	Fah	IC	HIGH	IN	IN	WIN	WIN	IN	IN	LOW	HIGH	LOW	HIGH	LOW	HIGH	LOW	HIGH	LOW	IN	OUT	
9	Aomsin	WIN	IN	WIN	IN	LOW	IN	LOW	IN	WIN	IN	IN	IN	IN	IN	LOW	HIGH	WIN	OUT		
10	Toktak	LOW	HIGH	IN	IN	IN	IN	WIN	IN	IN	IN	WIN	IN	WIN	IN	WIN	IN	OUT			
11	Noiinongz	WIN	HIGH	WIN	HIGH	IN	IN	IN	HIGH	WIN	HIGH	LOW	IN	LOW	IN	OUT		JOIN			
12	Wi	IC	IN	IN	HIGH	WIN	HIGH	IN	HIGH	IN	HIGH	LOW	IN	OUT		JOIN		JOIN			
13	Siaoff	WIN	IN	WIN	IN	IN	HIGH	IN	HIGH	WIN	IN	OUT						JOIN			
14	Su	IC	IN	LOW	IN	LOW	HIGH	WIN	IN	OUT								JOIN			
15	Purn	IC	IN	LOW	IN	WIN	IN	OUT										JOIN			
16	Dear	WIN	IN	WIN	IN	WD															
17	Pob	IC	IN	OUT																	
18	Kuikik	OUT																JOIN			

(WINNER) The contestant won The Restaurant War.
(FIRST RUNNER-UP) The contestant was a First Runner-Up.
(RUNNER-UP) The contestant was a Runner-Up.
(WIN) The contestant won the Individual Challenge.
(HIGH) The contestant was nominated with one of the two best dishes in the Individual Challenge.
(HIGH) The contestant was nominated in the Individual Challenge but did not win the episode.
(WIN) The contestant won the Restaurant War round.
(IN) The contestant advanced to the next round.
(TF) The contestant was transferred to the team of the winning chef trainer.
(IC) The contestant had to compete in the Individual Challenge to avoid elimination.
(LOW) The contestant was at risk of elimination.
(WD) The contestant is not at risk of being eliminated but requests to withdraw.
(OUT) The contestant was eliminated from the competition.
(JOIN) The eliminated contestant returned as an assistant.
(JOIN) The eliminated contestant returned as an assistant but wasn't chosen to help.

== Season 3 overview ==
Restaurant War Street King Thailand
- Season 3

Release
- Original network: Channel 7, Netflix
- Original release: June 21 – September 6, 2026

=== Episodes ===
Episode	Native Title	First aired
1	เปิดศึกแย่งทีม	June 21, 2026
2	สงครามสตรีตฟูด	June 28, 2026
3	ศึกล้มเชฟ	July 5, 2026
4	ศึกเปิดครัวครั้งแรก	July 12, 2026
5	ศึกตลาดแตก	July 19, 2026
6	ศึกชิงลูกทีม	July 26, 2026
7	เต้นไฟลุก ครัวสะเทือน	August 2, 2026
8	คำตัดสินจากนักวิจารณ์	August 9, 2026
9	พ่อค้าแม่ค้า ปะทะ เชฟมืออาชีพ	August 16, 2026
10	อาหารไทยสู่เวทีโลก	August 23, 2026
11	รอบรองชนะเลิศ–ศึกผสานรสชาติขั้นสุด	August 30, 2026
12	ศึกชิงแชมป์เจ้าแห่งสตรีตฟูด	September 6, 2026

=== Contestants ===
(ages stated are at start of filming)

Contestant	Age	Food product	Team		Place
Nokyak	45	Kaloji (胶罗钱)	Chef Art		Winner (September 6)
Seneh	29	Local eatery	Chef Pam		First Runner-Up (September 6)
Dragon	20	Pasta stall	Chef Ton		Second Runner-up (September 6)
Bee	39	Thai food shop owner	Chef Ton		Second Runner-up (September 6)
Eve	34	Hoy jor pu and Ho mok pu	Chef Ton		Eliminated in EP. 11 (August 30)
Tiw	34	Beef shop owner	Chef Pam	Chef Ton	Eliminated in EP. 11 (August 30)
Fluk	27	Hainanese chicken rice	Chef Art	Chef Ton	Eliminated in EP. 11 (August 30)
Mew	37	Fish rice porridge shop	Chef Pam		Eliminated in EP. 11 (August 30)
Ice	21	Authentic Thai food vendor	Chef Pam		Eliminated in EP. 11 (August 30)
Khaw	31	Rice porridge	Chef Pam		Eliminated in EP. 11 (August 30)
Hauk	37	Pad thai	Chef Art		Eliminated in EP. 11 (August 30)
Tar	36	Rice curry and rice porridge stall owner	Chef Pam	Chef Art	Eliminated in EP. 11 (August 30)
Kao	31	Boat noodles	Chef Ton	Chef Art	Eliminated in EP. 11 (August 30)
Mew	34	Chinese noodles	Chef Ton	Chef Pam	Eliminated in EP. 10 (August 23)
Nidnoi	40	Made-to-order dishes	Chef Art		Eliminated in EP. 9 (August 16)
Wadsana	54	Curry rice vendor	Chef Pam		Eliminated in EP. 8 (August 9)
Oam	41	Hainanese chicken rice	Chef Ton		Eliminated in EP. 7 (August 2)
Amp	36	Tod mun	Chef Art		Eliminated in EP. 5 (July 19)
Ya	56	Made-to-order dishes	Chef Ton		Eliminated in EP. 4 (July 12)
Auan	55	Wonton noodles	Chef Art		Eliminated in EP. 3 (July 5)
Or	56	Phat kaphrao	Chef Art		Eliminated in EP. 2 (June 28)

=== Contestant progress ===
Place	Contestant	Episodes																		
Place	Contestant	1	2		3		4		5		6	7		8		9		10	11	12
1	Nokyak	IN	IN	IN	IN	IN	IN	IN	HIGH	IN	IN	WIN	BYE	IN	WIN	IN	IN	IN	WIN	WINNER
2	Seneh	IN	IN	IN	IN	WIN	HIGH	WIN	IN	IN	IN	IC	WIN	HIGH	IN	IN	WIN	IN	WIN	FIRST RUNNER-UP
3	Dragon	IN	IN	IN	IN	WIN	IN	LOW	HIGH	IN	IN	IC	IN	IN	LOW	IN	WIN	WIN	WIN	SECOND RUNNER-UP
3	Bee	IN	WIN	BYE	HIGH	WIN	HIGH	IN	IN	IN	IN	IC	HIGH	IN	IN	HIGH	WIN	WIN	WIN	SECOND RUNNER-UP
5	Eve	SAVED	IN	IN	IN	WIN	IN	IN	WIN	BYE	IN	IC	IN	IN	LOW	IN	WIN	WIN	OUT	
5	Tiw	IN	HIGH	IN	IN	WIN	IN	WIN	HIGH	IN	TF	IC	IN	HIGH	IN	HIGH	WIN	WIN	OUT	
5	Fluk	IN	IN	IN	IN	LOW	IN	LOW	IN	IN	IN	WIN	BYE	IN	WIN	HIGH	TF	WIN	OUT	
5	Mew	IN	HIGH	IN	IN	WIN	IN	WIN	HIGH	WIN	IN	IC	IN	IN	IN	HIGH	WIN	IN	OUT	
5	Ice	SAVED	IN	HIGH	IN	WIN	IN	WIN	IN	IN	IN	IC	IN	IN	IN	IN	WIN	IN	OUT	
5	Khaw	IN	IN	WIN	HIGH	WIN	IN	WIN	IN	HIGH	IN	IC	IN	IN	IN	WIN	WIN	LOW	OUT	
5	Hauk	IN	IN	LOW	WIN	IN	IN	IN	IN	IN	IN	WIN	BYE	HIGH	WIN	HIGH	IN	IN	OUT	
5	Tar	IN	IN	IN	IN	WIN	WIN	WIN	IN	IN	IN	IC	TF	IN	WIN	IN	IN	LOW	OUT	
5	Kao	IN	IN	IN	IN	WIN	IN	IN	IN	IN	TF	WIN	BYE	IN	WIN	IN	IN	LOW	OUT	
14	Mew	IN	HIGH	IN	HIGH	WIN	IN	IN	IN	TF	IN	IC	IN	IN	LOW	IN	WIN	OUT		
15	Nidnoi	SAVED	IN	IN	HIGH	IN	IN	LOW	IN	IN	IN	WIN	BYE	IN	WIN	IN	OUT			
16	Wadsana	IN	IN	IN	HIGH	WIN	HIGH	WIN	IN	IN	IN	IC	LOW	WIN	OUT					
17	Oam	IN	IN	IN	IN	WIN	IN	IN	IN	LOW	IN	IC	OUT							
18	Amp	IN	IN	IN	IN	IN	IN	IN	HIGH	OUT										
19	Ya	IN	IN	IN	IN	WIN	IN	OUT												
20	Auan	IN	IN	LOW	IN	OUT														
21	Or	IN	IN	OUT																

(WINNER) The contestant won Restaurant War Street King Thailand.
(RUNNER-UP) The contestant was a Runner-Up.
(WIN) The contestant won the Individual Challenge / the Creative Cooking Challenge / the Challenge of Taste.
(HIGH) The contestant was nominated with one of the two best dishes in the Individual Challenge / the Creative Cooking Challenge / the Challenge of Taste.
(HIGH) The contestant was nominated in the Individual Challenge / the Creative Cooking Challenge / the Challenge of Taste but did not win the episode.
(WIN) The contestant won the Restaurant War round.
(WIN) The contestant won the Challenge on Street.
(HIGH) The contestant was the runner-up in the Challenge on Street round.
(WIN) The contestant won The Ultimate Chef Battle round.
(WIN) The contestant was part of the winning team in The Ultimate Chef Battle round.
(BYE) The contestant received a bye to the next round without having to compete.
(IN) The contestant advanced to the next round.
(TF) The contestant was transferred to the team of the winning chef trainer.
(TF) The contestant was transferred to the winning chef trainer's team in the Challenge of the Steal.
(SAVED) The contestants failed to qualify in the audition round held by the chef trainers; however, the head teacher brought them in based on their potential.
(IC) The contestant lost the Restaurant Wars round and had to compete in the Individual Challenge to avoid elimination.
(LOW) The contestant was at risk of elimination.
(LOW) The contestant was at risk of elimination but was the last person to advance.
(WD) The contestant is not at risk of being eliminated but requests to withdraw.
(OUT) The contestant was eliminated from the competition.

== Series overview ==
Series overview
Season	Contestants	Episodes	Originally released		Winner(s)	Runner(s)-up	Ref.
Season	Contestants	Episodes	First released	Last released	Winner(s)	Runner(s)-up	Ref.
1	18	12	September 22, 2024	December 15, 2024	Farn	Nut, BM and Yotus	
2	18	12	June 22, 2025	September 7, 2025	Bell	Off (First), Nokky, Patcha and Yoklan	
3	21	12	June 21, 2026	September 6, 2026	Nokyak	Seneh (First), Dragon and Bee	
