= Megan Whitmarsh =

Megan Whitmarsh (born 1972 in Cambridge, Massachusetts) is an American artist living in Los Angeles, California. Whitmarsh received an MFA from the University of New Orleans and a BFA from the Kansas City Art Institute, both in painting. Working predominantly with textiles, Whitmarsh uses hand-stitched embroidery to fabricate replicas of personal and cultural ephemera. Her embroidered canvases and soft sculptures reference contemporary pop culture and the 1970s and '80s eras of her childhood.

Her most recent body of work, Fabricated Revisions, consists of "imagined, handmade revisions" of past covers of prominent art magazines, featuring female artists who were overlooked at the time. About this body of work, Whitmarsh notes, "The way that I am interested in feminism is the way I am interested in many things. It's something peripheral to my view that influences my vision rather than being a focus. I am interested in watching the process of feminism rather than trying to locate it. I don't believe I could locate it… The artists I find compelling are mostly women and I decided to pay tribute to this personal fact. Many of these works are from a fictionalized past. From 1970-1980, Artforum devoted 5 of its 99 covers to women artists."

Whitmarsh has shown her work internationally, including solo exhibitions at New Image Art, Jack Hanley (NY), Elaine Levy Project (Brussels), Kling & Bang Gallery (Reykjavik), Krets Galleri (Malmo), and Katherine Mulherin Contemporary Art Projects (Toronto), among others. Her work has been included in group shows at the Zürich Museum of Design, Wolfsonian Museum (at Art Basel Miami Beach), Galerie Libraire (Hong Kong), White Columns and Gavin Brown's Enterprise as part of the Drunk vs. Stoned show.

In 1996 Whitmarsh began creating merchandise under the moniker "Tiny Industries", self-publishing Snow Monkey comic books, producing puppet shows and 6mm stop action short films as well as making hand-embroidered wallets and bags. Since 2006, Tiny Industries has been on hiatus due to the demands of Whitmarsh's fine art career.

In 2010, Whitmarsh was commissioned by Amy Sedaris to do the embroidery for "Simple Times, Crafts for Poor People". She was also commissioned by David Byrne to embroider the cover artwork of his "Ride Rise Roar" tour DVD. Todd Oldham has used two of her drawings for paint-by-numbers sets in his Kid Made Modern line of craft and art projects for children.

In 2018 Hammer Museum curators announced that Whitmarsh would be one of the 32 artists included in the fourth edition of the Made in LA biennial, scheduled from June 3 to September 2, 2018.

Between 1998 and 2000, Whitmarsh played keyboard as a founding member of the instrumental band The Hong Kong, with Harold Griffin, Matt Salata, and Aaron Carroll.
