= Lights at Night =

Lights At Night

Studio album by The Hong Kong
- Released: June 20, 2000
- Genre: Indie rock, Post-Rock
- Length: 30:36
- Label: The Orchard

The Hong Kong chronology
Lights At Night (2000)	Rock The Faces (2003)

Lights at Night was the first studio album by The Hong Kong.

== Track listing ==
1. "Cryptazoic" - 5:41
2. "Lifestylz" - 3:14
3. "Squaretriangle" - 3:12
4. "Winning Mission" - 6:30
5. "Secret Weapons" - 7:53
6. "Sunward Ho" - 4:06
