= Rock the Faces =

EP by The Hong Kong
- Released: October 14, 2003
- Length: 24:42
- Label: Etherdrag

The Hong Kong chronology
Lights at Night (2000)	Rock the Faces (2003)

Professional ratings
Review scores
Source	Rating
AllMusic	4/5 stars
Rolling Stone	3/5 stars

Rock the Faces is an EP by the band The Hong Kong released in 2003.

== Track listing ==
1. "Mazerati" – 3:12
2. "Galaxies" – 2:48
3. "Birds" – 3:07
4. "Rock The Faces" – 3:22
5. "Super Collider" – 3:09
6. "Disappear" – 1:54
7. "All That Empty Space" – 3:08
8. "It's On" – 4:02
