= HK (disambiguation) =

HK is a common abbreviation for Hong Kong, a former British Crown colony and current special administrative region of the People's Republic of China.

HK may also refer to:

== Businesses and organisations ==
- HK Magazine, a Hong Kong–based English-language weekly
- HKScan, formerly Helsingin Kauppiaat, a Finnish meat producer
- Handel og Kontor I Norge, the Union of Employees in Commerce and Offices in Norway
- Handels- og Kontorfunktionærernes Forbund i Danmark, the National Union of Commercial and Clerical Employees in Denmark
- Handknattleiksfélag Kópavogs, an Icelandic sports club
- Harman Kardon, a manufacturer of home and car audio equipment
- Heckler & Koch, a German firearms company
- Four Star Aviation (IATA airline designator)
- HKExpress, a low-cost carrier based in Hong Kong owned by Cathay Pacific

== In science and technology ==
- Metric horsepower, a measure of power (1 hk = 0.9863 hp (UK, US) = 0.7355 kW)
- Hefnerkerze, an old photometric unit of luminous intensity
- Hexokinase, an enzyme
- Sobolev space H^{k}, in mathematics

== Other uses ==
- Kyūkyoku!! Hentai Kamen, simplified as Hentai Kamen, a Japanese superhero comedy manga series
- .hk, Hong Kong's country top-level Internet domain
- HK$, the Hong Kong dollar
- HK-47, a fictional assassin droid from Star Wars video games
- Hello Kitty, a cartoon character by Sanrio
- School of Hard Knocks
- Hell's Kitchen (disambiguation)
- Hunter-killer (disambiguation)
- Henock "HK" Sileshi, a member of the group Brockhampton
- Hollow Knight, a game by Team Cherry
- Horowhenua-Kāpiti, a region of New Zealand's North Island
- HK (comic book), a French comic book
- Housekeeping (also HSKP or HSK), maintaining cleanliness and order in a home or establishment
