= Hell's Kitchen (disambiguation) =

Hell's Kitchen, Manhattan is a neighborhood in New York City.

Hell's Kitchen may also refer to:

== Films ==
- For the Love of Mike (1927 film), or Hell's Kitchen, a film by Frank Capra
- Tenth Avenue (film) or Hell's Kitchen, a 1928 American film
- Hell's Kitchen (1939 film), a film starring the Dead End Kids and Ronald Reagan
- Víctimas del Pecado or Hell's Kitchen, a 1951 film by Emilio Fernández
- Hell's Kitchen, a 1962 Japanese film by Umetsugu Inoue
- Hell's Kitchen (1998 film), a film featuring Angelina Jolie

== Music ==
- Hell's Kitchen (Andre Nickatina album) or its title song (2002)
- Hell's Kitchen (Leslie Spit Treeo album) (1994)
- Hell's Kitchen (Maxim album) or its title song (2000)
- Hell's Kitchen, an album by Jazzkantine (2008)
- "Hell's Kitchen", a song by Dream Theater from Falling into Infinity (1997)
- Hell's Kitchen (musical), a 2023 musical
- Hell's Kitchen (Original Broadway Cast Recording)

== Television ==
- Hell's Kitchen (British TV series), a cooking-based reality show starring Gordon Ramsay
- Hell's Kitchen (American TV series), an American version of the British show
- Hell's Kitchen Suomi, a Finnish version of the British show
- Hell's Kitchen Australia, an Australian version of the British show
- Hell's Kitchen Italia, an Italian version of the British show
- Hell's Kitchen Albania, an Albanian version of the British show
- Hell's Kitchen Hrvatska, a Croatian version of the British show
- Hell's Kitchen Thailand, a Thai version of the British show

== Other uses ==
- Hell's Kitchen (novel), a novel by Jeffrey Deaver
- Hell's Kitchen (painting), a 19th-century oil painting of Newcastle upon Tyne eccentrics
- Hell's Kitchen (restaurant), a chain of restaurants from Gordon Ramsay, inspired by his American reality TV show
