= Hgk =

HGK or Hgk may refer to:

== Organisations ==
- Croatian Chamber of Economy (Croatian: Hrvatska gospodarska komora)
- General Directorate of Mapping (Turkish: Harita Genel Komutanlığı)
- Häfen und Güterverkehr Köln, City of Cologne, Germany

== Other uses ==
- HGK (bomb) (Turkish: Hassas gudum kiti), a bomb guidance kit
- Hgk, a GUI interface for the computer development software Mercurial; see Comparison of version-control software
- "H-G-K", a song by Band-Maid from the 2021 album Unseen World

== See also ==
- HKG (disambiguation)
