= Crab jujube =

Chinese dish

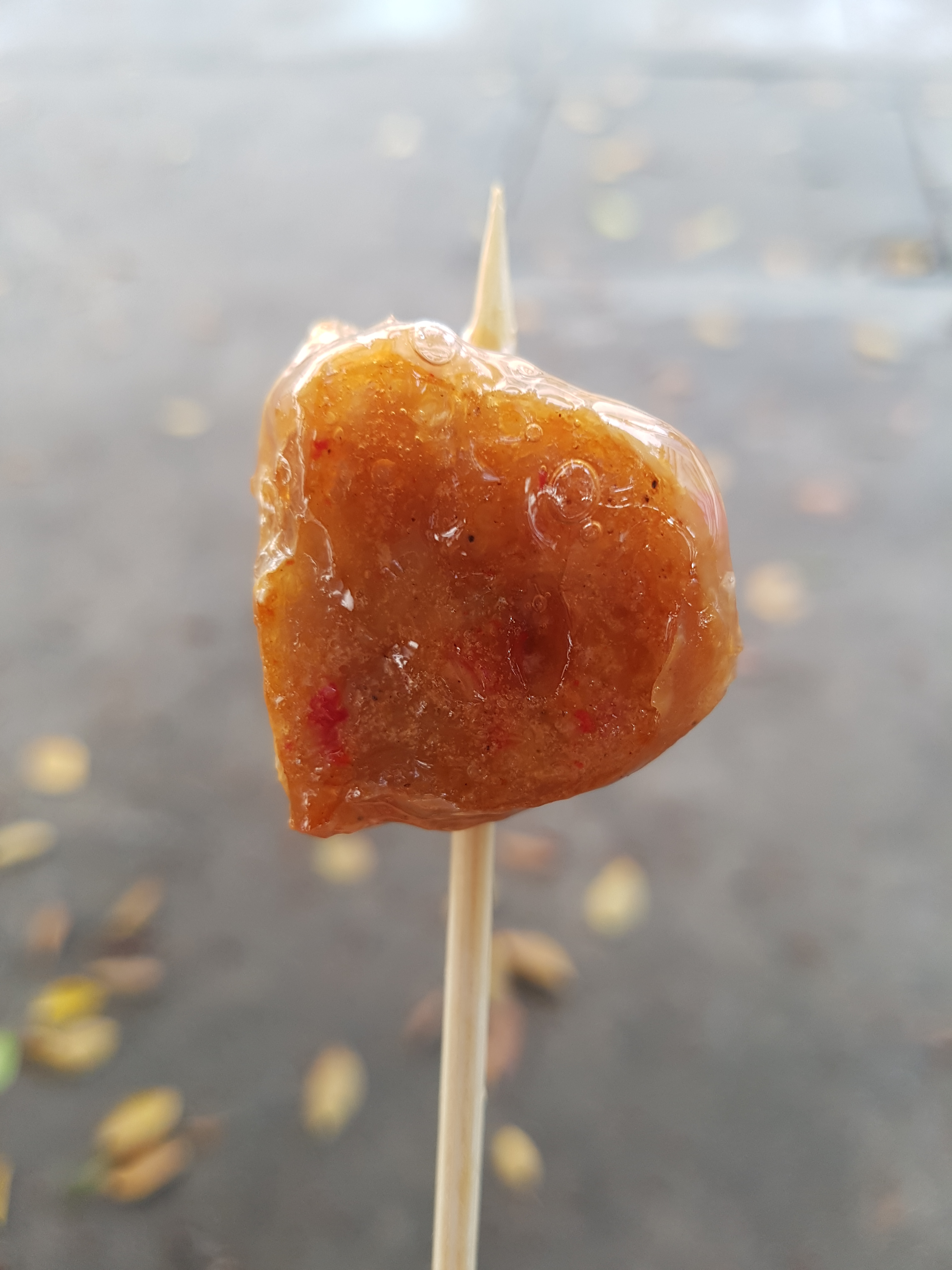
hoi jo

Crab jujube or hoi jo (Chinese: 蟹棗; lit. 'crab jujube'; Peng'im: hoi6 jo2; Thai: ห่อยจ้อ, RTGS: hoicho) is a Chinese dish from Chaozhou which contains a set of small deep-fried, jujube fruit-shaped, crab cakes. Its main ingredients are crab meat, pork fat (or ground pork belly), chopped water chestnuts, eggs, vegetables, and herbs, which are wrapped into a sheet of fresh tofu skin, forming long rolls, cut into bite-sized pieces, and deep-fried. Crab jujube is a popular dish among Thai Chinese people in Thailand where it is known as hoicho.
