= Honey toast =

Japanese dessert

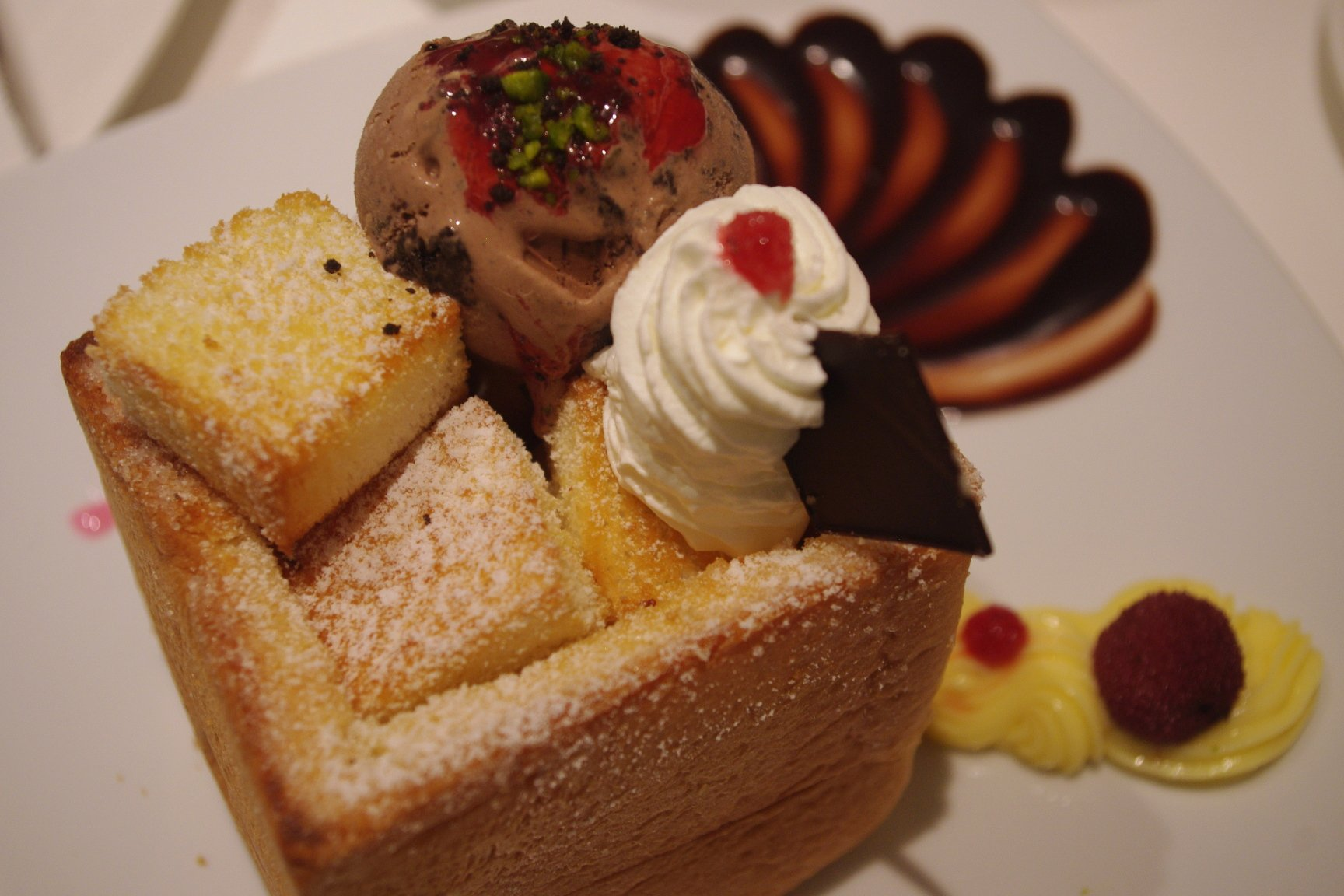
- Honey toast served in a café in Taipei
- Place of origin: Japan
- Serving temperature: Hot
- Main ingredients: pain de mie, honey, ice cream

Honey toast (Japanese:ハニートースト), also known as Shibuya toast, brick toast, and hanitō is a Japanese dessert that originated from the district of Shibuya during the Japanese asset price bubble, often served at karaoke bars. It is also popular in other parts of the world, most prominently Taiwan, Thailand, and Singapore.

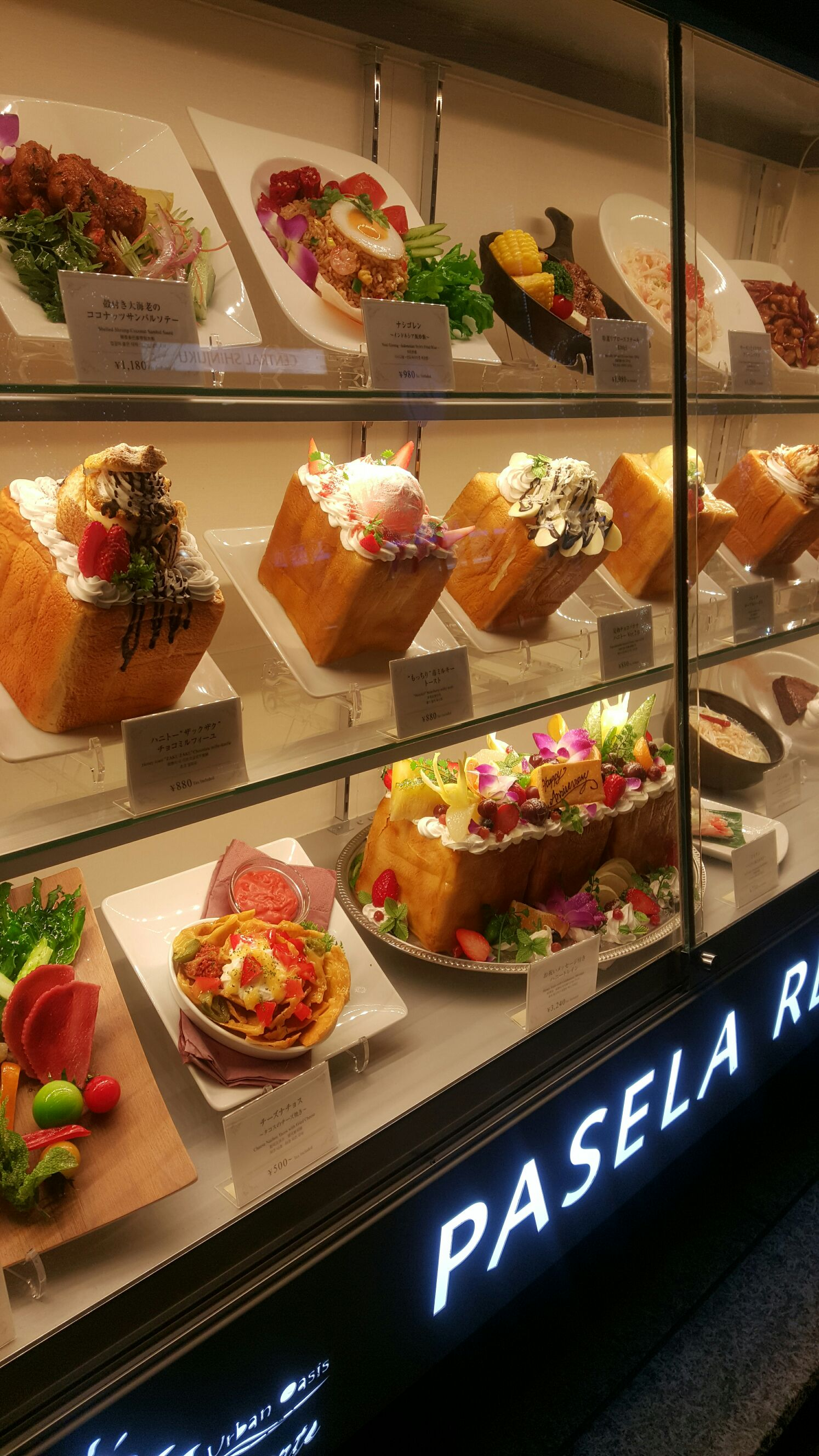
Different variants of honey toast being displayed at a karaoke bar in Shinjuku

== Preparation ==
The main component of honey toast is bread, preferably pain de mie. The bread is hollowed out and then cut into small cubes. The cubes and the loaf shell are then caramelized, by brushing them with a butter and honey mixture and placing them into the oven until golden. While layering the baked cubes back into the loaf, it is filled with what one may desire, most commonly macerated fruits, toasted nuts, various flavors of syrup or whipped cream. As a finishing touch, the toast is topped with ice cream. The Taiwanese version of the dish however is more subdued, usually only topped with condensed milk, custard or cheese.

== Gallery ==
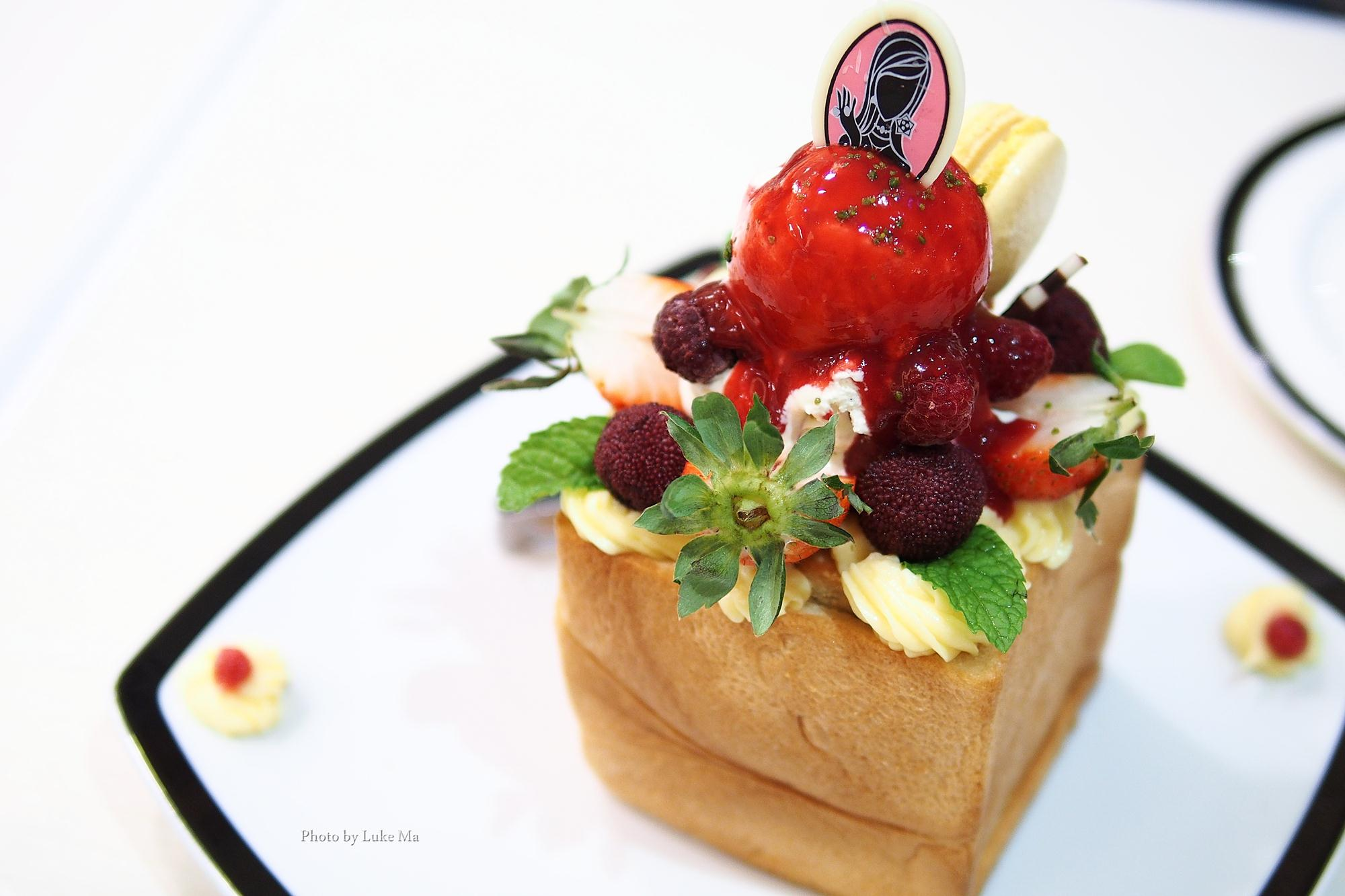

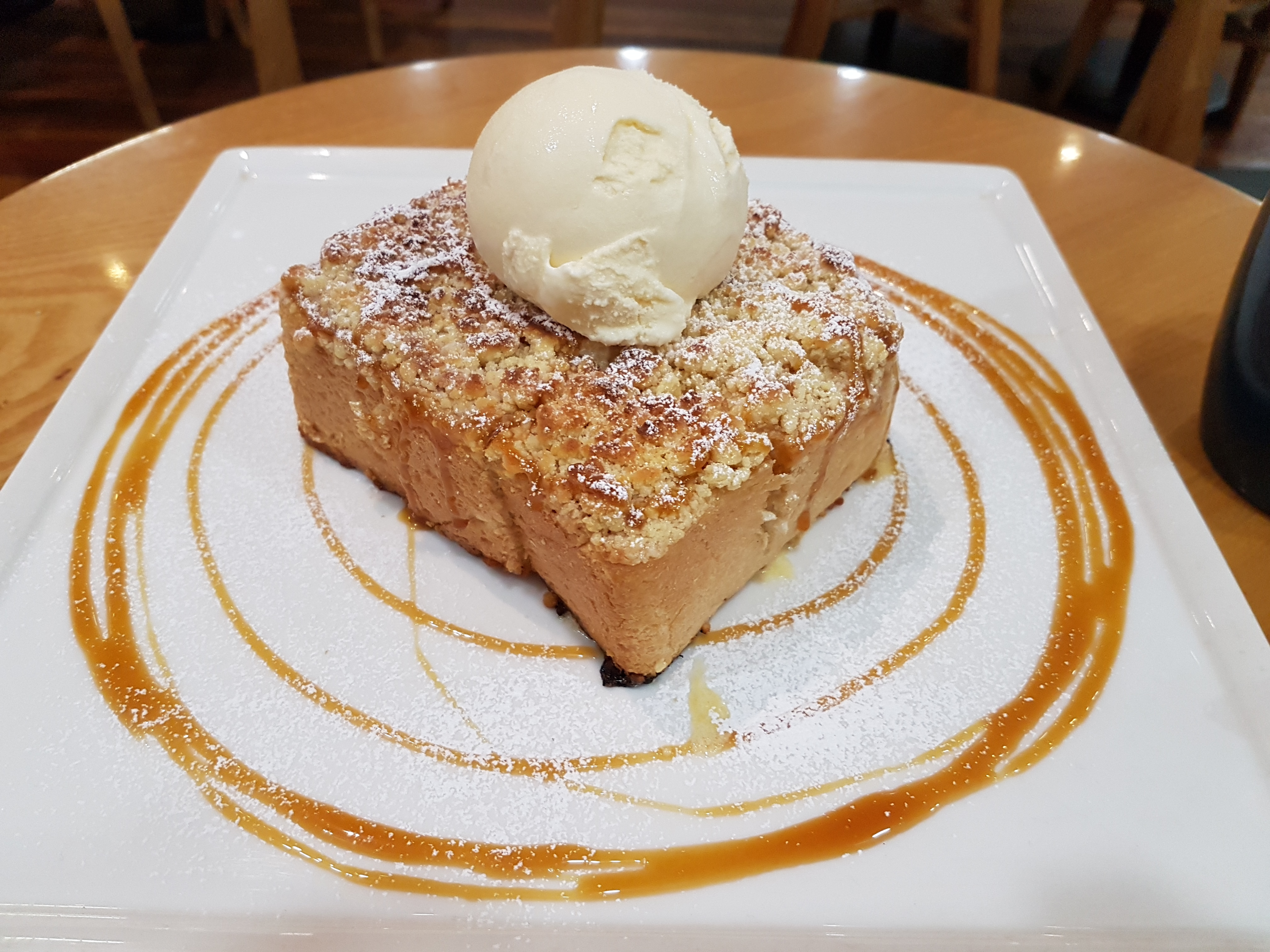

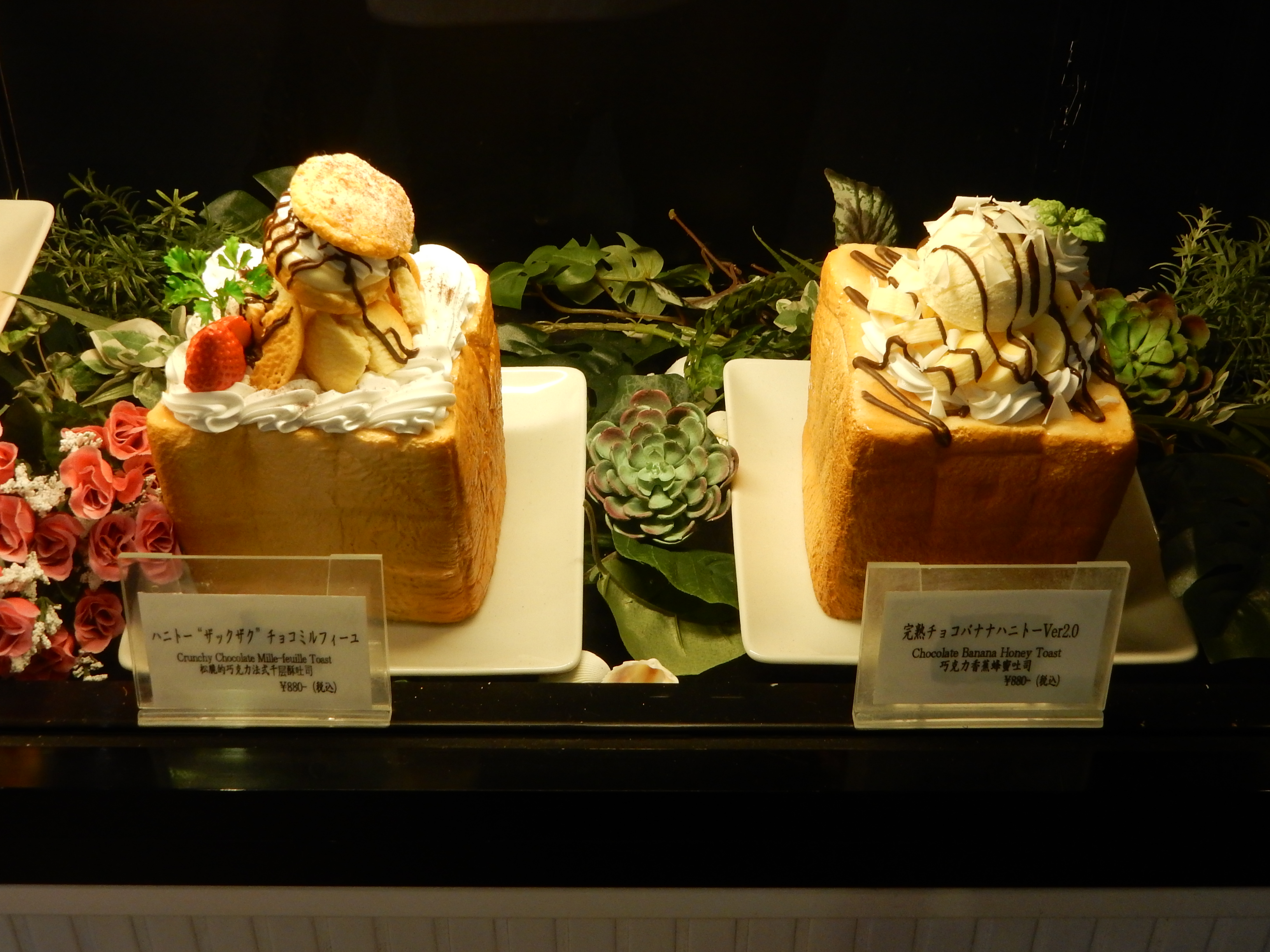

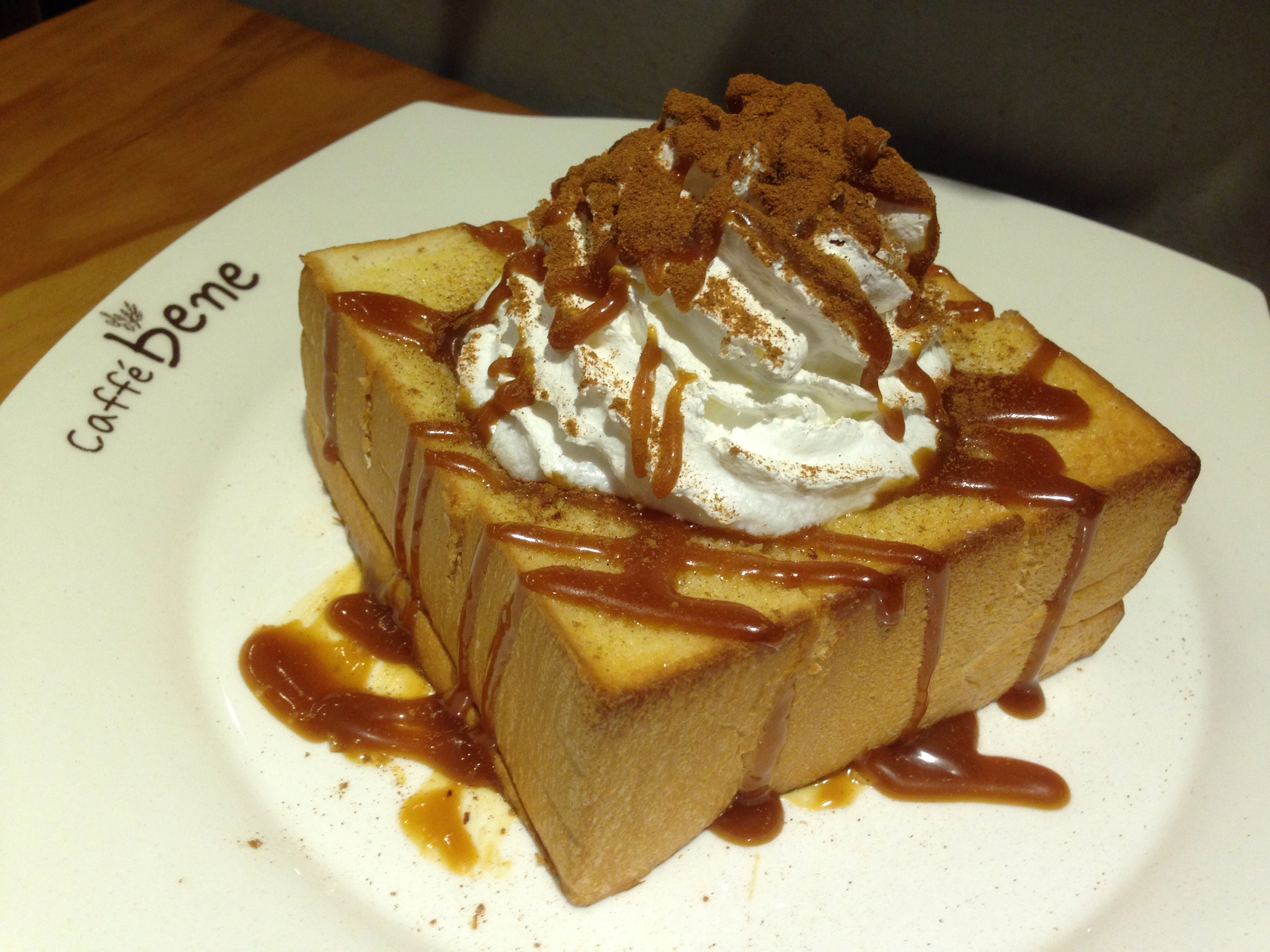
