= Hong Kong 97 (disambiguation) =

Hong Kong 97 is a 1995 video game made for the Super Famicom.

Hong Kong 97 may also refer to:

- Handover of Hong Kong in 1997
- Hong Kong '97, a 1994 American action thriller film
- HK97, a bacterial virus
