= GHK =

GHK may refer to:

- Gahcho Kue Aerodrome, in the Northwest Territories, Canada
- Geko Karen, a language of Burma
- GHK algorithm, a regression model
- Ghotki railway station, in Pakistan
- Glasgow High Kelvinside, a Scottish rugby union club
- Goldman–Hodgkin–Katz flux equation
- Goldman–Hodgkin–Katz voltage equation
- Gush Katif Airport, in the Gaza Strip
- Wood and Plastic Union, a former German trade union
