= KGH =

KGH could refer to:

- The Royal Greenland Trading Department (Danish: Den Kongelige Grønlandske Handel, KGH)
- Kalinga language (ISO 639-3 language code KGH)
- Kemira GrowHow (Helsinki Stock Exchange symbol KGH)

== Hospitals ==
- Kelowna General Hospital in Kelowna, British Columbia, Canada
- Kettering General Hospital, Northamptonshire, England
- King George Hospital, Visakhapatnam, India
- Kingston General Hospital in Kingston, Ontario, Canada

== Transportation ==
- Kinghorn railway station, Scotland, station code
- Kogarah railway station, Sydney, Australia, station code

== Places ==
- King George Hub, Surrey, British Columbia, Canada
- Kew Gardens Hills, Queens, New York, USA
