= Hell's Kitchen Thailand =

- Genre: Reality competition
- Created by: Gordon Ramsay
- Starring: Willment Leong; Kwantip Devakula; Ian Kittichai; Natawoot Thammaphan
- Narrated by: Piya Vimuktayon
- Country of origin: Thailand
- Original language: Thai
- No. of series: 3
- No. of episodes: 28

Production
- Producer: Heliconia H GROUP
- Production locations: The Studio Park, Bang Bo District, Samut Prakan Province
- Running time: 100–120 minutes

Original release
- Network: Channel 7 Channel 7 HD
- Release: 4 February 2024 – present

Hell's Kitchen Thailand (Thai: เฮลล์คิทเช่นไทยแลนด์) is a Thai cooking reality competition television series based on the British series of the same name. To find the winner to be the head of the kitchen in a real restaurant, Heliconia H Group purchased the rights from ITV Studios. It's hosted by Chef Willment Leong, Chef Kwantip Devakula, Chef Ian Kittichai, and Chef Natawoot "Off" Thammaphan. It first aired on 4 February 2024, on Channel 7 HD.

== Format ==
Hell Kitchen Thailand is a reality cooking competition show that uses a continuous elimination format to test the determination of the contestants to cook throughout the season. From 16 contestants, one winner will be eliminated to become the head chef in a real restaurant. Heliconia H GROUP, the producer of many famous Thai cooking competition shows such as Iron Chef Thailand, MasterChef Thailand, The Next Iron Chef Thailand, Bid Coin Chef, Top Chef Thailand, has reached an agreement to purchase the rights with ITV Studios, the copyright owner of this show from the United Kingdom, to produce it in a Thai format from 2022.

Hell's Kitchen Thailand is different from other countries in terms of the show's Head Chefs, as there are four of them who rotate in the kitchen during the dinner service period each week. This means that each week the contestants must cook and serve four different dishes, which rotate according to the Head Chef in charge of the kitchen that week:

- Classic Western Cuisine, curated by Chef Willment Leong (Chef Willment)
- Contemporary Thai Cuisine, curated by Kwantip Devakula (Chef Pom)
- Modern Western Cuisine, managed by Pongtawat Chalermkittichai (Chef Ian)
- Asian food with a twist, curated by Natawoot Thammaphan (Chef Off)

The competition format of Hell's Kitchen Thailand is mostly based on the American format, which is to invite competitors from all professions with cooking experience, including culinary students and professional chefs to join the competition. The competitors are divided into two teams: the red team for women and the blue team for men. They will receive chef uniforms with panels of that color on the shoulders. Everyone stays on the same team for most of the competition. However, team transfers can occur if the executive chefs deem that the number of competitors on the two teams that week is two or more people different, or the working abilities of the two teams are very different. Each team transfer is at the discretion of the executive chefs.

=== Challenge ===
In the Challenge round, each competitor or team is tasked with cooking a dish based on the weekly Chef's Challenge theme in various forms within a set cooking time, which is usually 45 minutes. After the time is up, the Chef judges each competitor's dish on a scale of 0-3 points per dish. The team or competitor with the highest total score wins the round and receives prizes (recreational activities outside the Hell's Kitchen, among other possible prizes). The losing team or competitor is subject to penalties, with prizes and penalties varying from week to week.

=== Dinner service ===
Prior to the dinner service competition, contestants study a menu from the Executive Chef's cookbook for that week. They are then assigned to a specific kitchen section (appetizer, meat, seafood, sauce, garnish or side dish, and dessert) and are given two hours to prepare their meal, working with their teammates, to ensure that the food quality and presentation meet Hell's Kitchen's high standards, and are ready to serve dinner to 100 paying guests who have made reservations expecting an appetizer, main course, and dessert.

The menu for the dinner service changes every week, depending on the head chef in charge of the kitchen that week. In addition, during the service, competitors may cook according to a special task, such as serving food to special guests sitting at the chef's table near the kitchen, sending one competitor from the team to cook a special dish for a customer who does not eat a certain protein in the main course, presenting the menu to customers during the service, or cooking and decorating the dish at the customer's table, etc.

After the opening of Hell's Kitchen Restaurant, the Head Chef in charge of the kitchen for that week will demand that all orders for each course be served to each table at the same time, and will return all orders if any dish is not cooked properly, such as being undercooked or under-seasoned, or not seasoned correctly. Although he may send in incomplete orders to encourage the contestants to come together, as the contestants are divided into teams, the Head Chef is assisted by two trusted sous-chefs, who each oversee a separate side of the kitchen to the same standards and alert the Head Chef of any problems.

The head chef's goal is to finish serving dinner every time. However, if one or both teams have serious problems and do not meet Hell's Kitchen standards, the head chef will close the kitchen early and send all competitors out of the kitchen and back to their rooms, which will end the dinner service of that team immediately (in this case, customers who received orders from the closed team will receive rice, Phat kaphrao, fried eggs, or other menus instead and receive a full refund of the reservation). In addition, if a competitor makes too many mistakes, the head chef may individually dismiss that competitor from the kitchen (usually three times, but the number of times may change, or sometimes there may not be an individual dismissal from the kitchen, depending on the discretion of each head chef).

=== Elimination ===
After the competition, dinner will be served (after the Hell's Kitchen restaurant closes). The decisions of the head chef each week can be divided into 3 cases as follows:

- If there is no kitchen closure, the Head Chef in charge of the kitchen for that week will gather the contestants from the Blue Team kitchen to the Red Team kitchen and announce the winner and loser of the dinner service round for that week based on the mistakes made during the cooking. In some weeks, if both teams make close to the same number of mistakes, it may be declared a draw.
- If only one kitchen is closed, the team that is not closed will be the winner of that week's dinner service round by default.
- If both kitchens are closed, both teams will lose by default.

The losing teams must jointly select at least two contestants who they think should be eliminated (in the case of a tie, only one contestant from each team will be eliminated). After the meeting, the executive chefs will gather the contestants in the dining room, with the winning team sitting together on the left side of the executive chefs, while the losing team will stand in front of the executive chefs. Then, a representative from the losing team will nominate a contestant who should be eliminated according to the meeting. The executive chef will call all the nominated contestants to the front (or in some cases, the executive chef in charge of the kitchen that week can cancel the nomination and/or select the contestant himself/herself as appropriate) and ask each person to explain why they should stay on the show, or explain their duties, responsibilities, and mistakes in the kitchen department that made mistakes, or may ask a fellow contestant about who should be eliminated.

After the nominated contestants have answered the head chef's questions, the head chef of that week will eliminate at least one contestant each week, and sometimes eliminate an unnominated contestant. The eliminated contestant must return his or her uniform and leave the restaurant through the hallway. The head chef of that week will then send the remaining contestants back to their rooms, and then go back up to the executive chef's office to hang up the eliminated contestant's uniform. The contestant's photo will then be burned. During this scene, the head chef of that week's kitchen will be in the voiceover explaining his or her decision to eliminate the contestant.

When the season is more than half over and the number of contestants left as required by the Executive Chefs, there will be a Black Jacket Round. The remaining contestants from both teams will be combined into one team and will be given a Black Jacket to show that they are the last contestants left in Hell's Kitchen Thailand for that season. They will then compete until there are only 2 contestants left to advance to the final service.

=== Final service ===
At the end of each season, the top two contestants will be promoted to the head chefs of both teams, and the eliminated contestants will return to their teams. The selection of the former contestants to the team depends on the contestant who is the head chef. The contestant who has the highest score in the previous round will have the right to choose the team first. The head chefs are responsible for creating the menu for the appetizer, main course and dessert, as well as planning and delegating the duties of taking care of each station in each team's kitchen to their team members.

Before opening the restaurant in this round, the Executive Chefs will make sure that all menus from both teams meet Hell's Kitchen standards. They and their sous chefs will also oversee service to ensure that the two Executive Chefs maintain the restaurant's high quality standards, but will not interfere, allowing the contestants to fully demonstrate their ability to control the kitchen (except in rare cases where the contestants do not resolve the issues with the teams appropriately). If a customer places an order for both teams, both teams must run the full number of orders and serve them together.

After the service, all 100 diners will vote for the two contestants for the panel of executive chefs to use in their judging. After the judging, the executive chefs’ office has two doors leading out to a balcony above the Hell’s Kitchen dining room. The executive chefs have the two contestants stand behind two separate doors, with only one door opening. After the executive chefs instruct both contestants to turn the doorknobs at the same time, the one who opens the door is declared the season’s winner, who receives 1,000,000 Thai baht (฿) in prize money and the opportunity to work with the Hell’s Kitchen chain of restaurants in Thailand. In addition, the winner will have their picture hung with the other winners, visible at the entrance to the restaurant.

Note: In the final round of Season 1, Princess UbolRatana Rajakanya joined the restaurant as an honorary guest for a meal.

== Series overview ==
Series overview
Season	Contestants	Episodes	Originally released		Winner(s)	Runner(s)-up	Ref.
Season	Contestants	Episodes	First released	Last released	Winner(s)	Runner(s)-up	Ref.
1	16	15	February 4, 2024	May 19, 2024	Bew Phutaecho	Kerr	
2	18	13	July 17, 2025	October 14, 2025	Sangthian Singkaew	Natawat Matathanyaboon	
3	16	10	October 4, 2026	TBA	TBA	TBA	TBA
