= Hunter-killer team =

Military unit

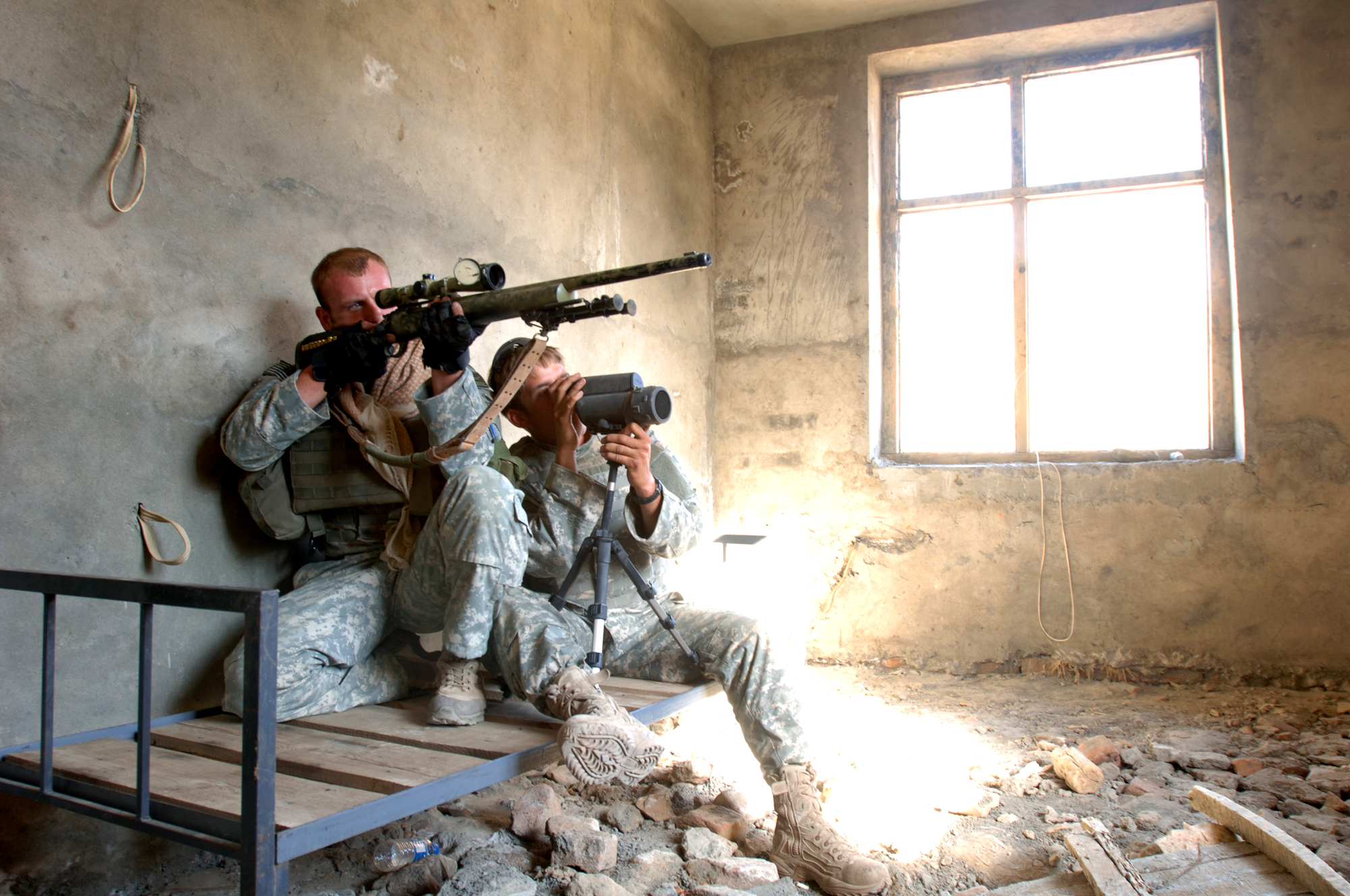
U.S. Army sniper team in Afghanistan. The spotter acts as a "hunter" while the shooter acts as a "killer".

A hunter-killer team is a team that separates the tasks of "hunting" and "killing" to two or more individuals.

Examples include:

- Two-person sniper teams, one using specialized optical hardware and the other a rifle
- Pairs of F-4G Wild Weasel V and F-16Cs, where the F-4G "hunter" could detect, identify, and locate an enemy's radar and then direct the F-16C's weapons to the site
- Bradley fighting vehicles may "hand off" fire missions to M1 Abrams main battle tanks in their hunter-killer team. However, Bradleys with TOW missiles may also be able to engage.
- "Pink teams" of scout and attack helicopters, such as OH-6 "Loach" or OH-58 Kiowa scout helicopters and the AH-1 Cobra attack helicopter during the Vietnam War
- In anti-submarine warfare a Maritime patrol aircraft may be employed as "hunter", with surface ships such as destroyers as killers.
- Task Forces such as Task Force 88 where one element, the "hunter," (e.g., CIA Operatives) gathers intelligence on the target while the other, the "killer," (e.g., Delta Force or Rangers) acts on the intelligence and eliminates the target.
- Independent "hunter-killer sights", such as on the FV-214 Conqueror, where the tank commander can independently "hunt" and range a target, while the gunner is still aiming at and "killing" a previous target.

== Operations ==
Hunter killer operations are prolonged operations conducted in irregular warfare by a unique and specifically organized force, in conjunction with an indigenous force, against irregular warfare adversaries by operating behind the lines or in hostile, safe haven, or semi permissive environments, employing unorthodox tactics, for the sole purpose of achieving attrition and punitive actions predominantly against the personnel, leadership, and resources of the enemy.

=== Principles ===
Hunter-killer forces and operations:

- are best employed during irregular warfare environments
- require independent maneuver in enemy territory
- should not be formed ad hoc
- require specialized training in enemy tactics and weaponry, long-range endurance operations, infiltration and exfiltration techniques, and combat techniques
- require equal or superior maneuverability and mobility to the enemy in order to succeed

=== Advantages ===
The hunter-killer approach provides:

- versatility through its combination of combat power, reconnaissance capability, and survivability.
- the ability to effectively acquire information aggressively, perform security, and conduct counter-reconnaissance.
- control of any predicament the team is in, and of the operational tempo, denying this to the enemy.
- psychological effects on the enemy, specifically their will to fight.
