= GKH =

GKH may refer to:

- Gagauz Halkı, a defunct political party in Moldova
- Greg Kroah-Hartman, American Linux kernel programmer
