= Hunter Killer (video game) =

1989 video game

- Developer: Virgin Mastertronic
- Publisher: Virgin Mastertronic
- Platforms: Amiga, Atari ST
- Release: 1989

Hunter Killer is a 1989 video game published by Virgin Mastertronic.

== Gameplay ==
Hunter Killer is a game in which the player is an American submarine commander involved in Pacific warfare during World War II. The game features a practice mode, and 14 available missions consisting of five coastal missions, six special missions, and three attack missions. The player commands a Gato-class submarine with armament consisting of 10 torpedoes and a deck gun.

== Reception ==
Reception

Review scores
Publication	Score
Amiga Computing	78%
The Games Machine (UK)	74%

Mike Siggins reviewed Hunter Killer for Games International magazine, and gave it a rating of 1 out of 10 (a turkey), and stated that "As a guide, if I felt like wasting the time, I am sure I could knock out something approximating to Hunter Killer yet my programming skills are laughable. It really is that bad."

The Games Machine felt that the game was not as exciting as other submarine simulations, but advised that "If it appeals to you and you can't find Silent Service in a bargain bucket, get it."

John Kennedy for Amiga Computing found the game to be "a worthwhile challenge at a remarkable price" and commented that "Suddenly I find I'd rather play this rather lo-tech game in preference to the latest scrolling shoot-'em-ups. Perhaps I'm getting old."
