= KHG =

KHG may refer to:

- Khams Tibetan (ISO 639 language code: khg) a Tibetic language used in Kham
- Kashgar Airport (IATA airport code: KHG; ICAO airport code: ZWSH) Kashi, Xinjiang, China
- Khushal Garh railway station (rail code: KHG) in Pakistan
- Kommunistische Hochschulgruppe (KHG; University Communist Society; literally Communist High School Group), a division of the Communist League of West Germany
