= Junior MasterChef Thailand season 1 =

Thai TV show airing in 2013

Junior MasterChef Thailand
- Season 1
- No. of episodes: 17

Release
- Original network: CH3
- Original release: 8 February – 2 June 2013

The first (and only) season of Junior MasterChef Thailand, began on 8 February 2013 and aired on Channel 3. It was produced by Shine Limited. The series was revived five years later as MasterChef Junior Thailand.

The first season consisted of 17 episodes, with 50 child competitors, aged from 8 to 12 years old. Patiparn Pataweekarn, Bunn "Ik" Boriboon, and Chachaya "Bib" Raktakanit were the judges.

The series began with the Top 50 selected from the 5,500 applicants who auditioned for the show. The Top 50 featured five heats, with ten from the Top 50 who were best at the heat's team participating in each heat. Afterwards, the judges selected four to move forward to the Top 20. Furthermore, the Top 20 competed in two challenges to pick the Top 20. Contrast to other versions, contestants are not eliminated every week; rather, four are eliminated at every stage of the competition. Every eliminated contestant received a range of prizes, including those in the Top 50.

== Contestants ==
The top 10 contestants were chosen throughout the first week of challenges amongst the Top 50 and the Top 20. The full group of 10 were all revealed on:

Contestant	Age	Hometown	Status
Onpreeya "Aem" Detanantachat	12	Bangkok	Winner June 2
Pornchita "Beem" Maneesri	12	Bangkok	Runner-Up June 2
Pollawat "Ake" Wangleard	12	Bangkok	Eliminated May 26
Bulkris "Kris" Manmin	10	Bangkok	Eliminated May 26
Onpailin "Am" Detanantachat	10	Bangkok	Real Contestant
Bunyawee "Lookchan" Pakwisan	11	Bangkok	Real Contestant
Chananchida "Ploy" Tanasapornpol	12	Bangkok	Real Contestant
Chananchida "Ploy" Tanasapornpol	10	Bangkok	Real Contestant
Udomchai "Hokcai" Limwilas	11	Prachinburi	Real Contestant
Ronnachai "Rifle" Sangprom	12	Chanthaburi	Real Contestant
Poochita "Haya" Teerasakdipop	8	Bangkok	Real Contestant
Ehsanul "Ehsan" Haque	10	Bangkok	Real Contestant
Tananuch "Password" Tepkanjana	12	Bangkok	Real Contestant
Kannarat "Earth" Suwanchuen	10	Bangkok	Real Contestant
Nadia Bunton	12	Bangkok	Real Contestant
Woralapa "Pyn" Lojaya	9	Bangkok	Real Contestant
Pootawan "Poom" Dangjad	10	Samut Prakan	Real Contestant
Chitchanok "Bill" Chantamat	10	Nakhon Pathom	Real Contestant
Bunyita "Baiteoy" Tungsuntorntam	8	Bangkok	Real Contestant
Sirin "Mewmew" Sirisup	8	Bangkok	Real Contestant
