= Phat kaphrao =

Fried rice dish from Thailand

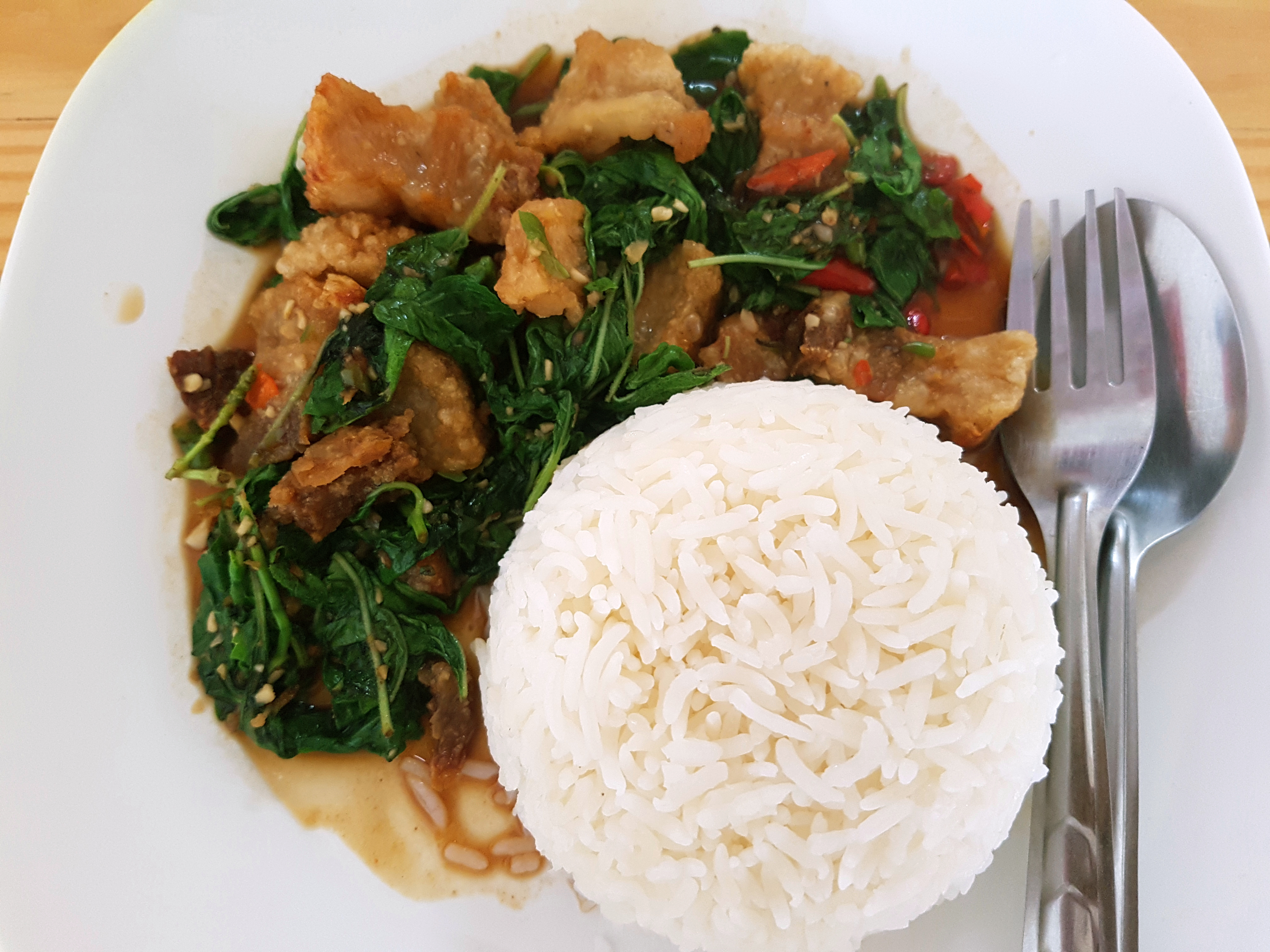
- A plate of phat kaphrao mu krop with rice
- Type: Rice dish
- Course: entree or main
- Place of origin: Thailand
- Associated cuisine: Thai
- Serving temperature: hot
- Main ingredients: rice; holy basil; meat or seafood; garlic; Thai fish sauce; Thai chili; sugar

Pad kaphrao (Thai: ผัดกะเพรา, pronounced [pʰàt kà.pʰrāw]; transl. stir-fried holy basil), also spelled pad kaprow, pad kaprao, or pad gaprao, is one of the most popular Thai dishes in Thailand.

== History ==
Phat kaphrao originated around the reign of King Rama VII (r. 1925–1935 CE), as Chinese immigrants in Thailand began selling it at restaurants. Before the invention of phat kaphrao, the most similar dish was phat bai horapha (stir-fried beef and Thai basil). These dishes were likely adaptations of the Chinese dish xiāngcài chǎo niúròu (Chinese: 香菜炒牛肉; lit. 'stir-fried beef and coriander').

Phat kraphao is considered a national dish in Thailand today but it only became popular in the country after 1957. Phat kaphrao was included in cookbooks in the late 1970s but the method of preparation was different. It involved marinating minced meat with liquor first, then seasoning the dish with only fish sauce and palm sugar.

== Ingredients ==
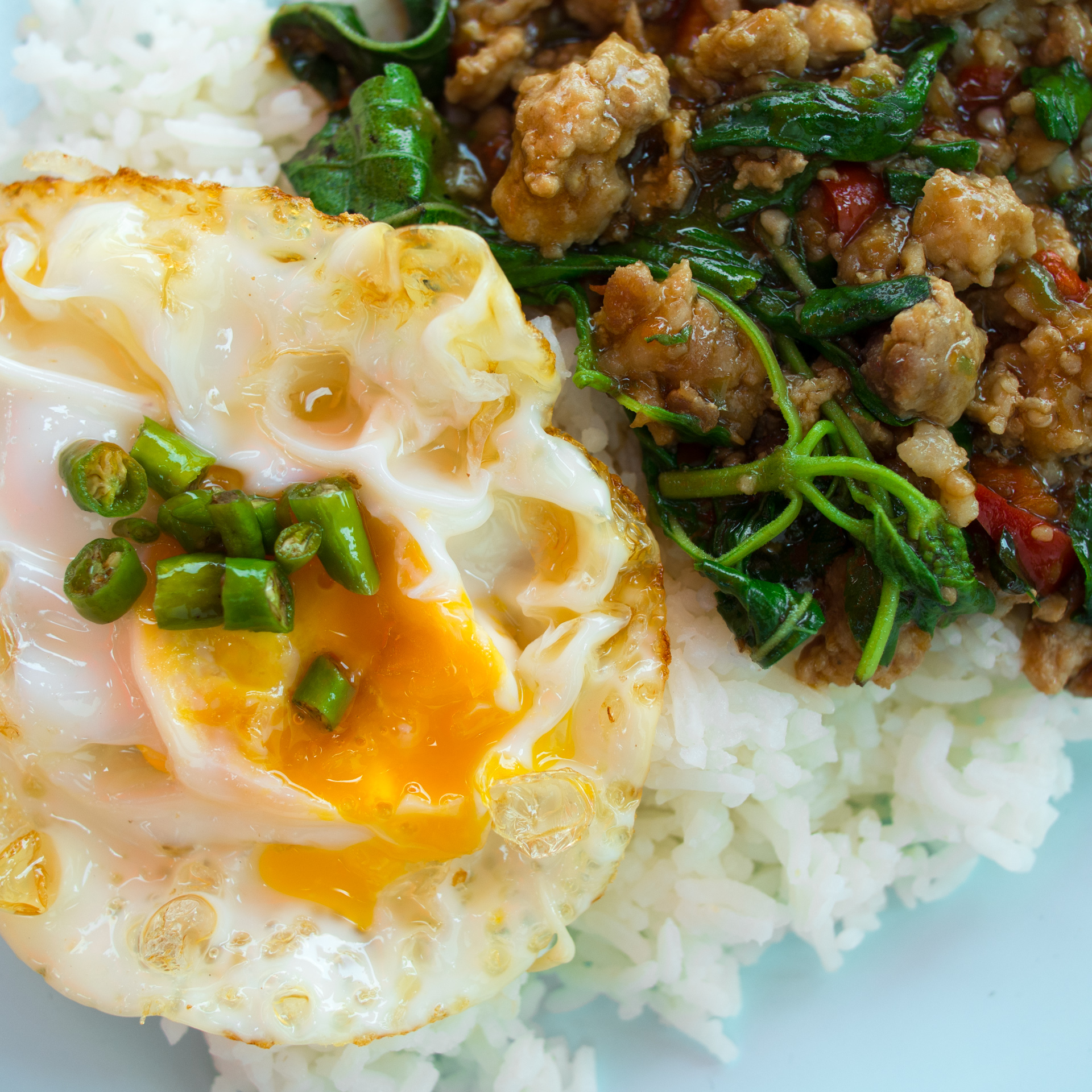
Phat kaphrao mu sap with rice and a fried egg

Phat kaphrao consists of meat such as pork, chicken, beef, or seafood stir fried with holy basil and garlic. It is served with rice and optionally topped with fried eggs. The main seasonings are soy sauce, Thai fish sauce, oyster sauce (optional), cane sugar, and bird's eye chili.

Over time, phat kaphrao has evolved with the addition of other ingredients such as Chinese century eggs and Thai local vegetables, namely asparagus beans, baby corns, onions, carrots, banana peppers, mushrooms, bamboo shoots and coconut shoots. However, adding vegetables in phat kaphrao is also seen as an effort to reduce the cost of meat and increase profit margins on the part of food vendors.

Common variants may use chicken, pork, minced pork, pork livers, crispy pork belly, beef, minced beef, meatballs, prawns, squid, meat and seafood, seafood, Chinese century eggs, or mushrooms.

== Popularity ==
=== Thailand ===
Phat kaphrao is inexpensive, easy to prepare, nutritious, and fast to eat. It is generally eaten with rice.

=== Japan ===
Phat kaphrao and khao man kai (ข้าวมันไก่) are popular in Japan and is often cooked at home.

=== Taiwan ===
In Taiwan, the dish is usually made with pork and referred to as 打拋豬 (Dǎ pāo zhū). The usual recipe includes tomatoes.

== See also ==
- Thai cuisine
- Tourism in Thailand
- List of rice dishes
- Pad see ew
- Traditional food
- Mie aceh
- Mie goreng
- Char kway teow
- List of Thai dishes
