= MasterChef Thailand season 7 =

Season of television series

MasterChef Thailand
- Season 7
- No. of episodes: 15

Release
- Original network: Channel 7, Netflix
- Original release: February 15 – May 31, 2026

Season chronology
- ← Previous; Season 6 Next → Season 8

MasterChef Thailand Season 7 is the seventh edition of the original MasterChef Thailand series. It originally aired every Sunday on Channel 7 and in Netflix Thailand, starting on February 15, 2026. The host Piyathida Mittiraroch returns in this season with the same judge panel as every other prior series, including Pasan Svastivatana, Kwantip Devakula, and Pongtawat Chalermkittichai.

This season's audition uses the same criteria as seasons 1–4, where those who auditioned have not work in a professional setting, but may have gone through culinary schools before register. The show has received more than 1,000 applicants this year, but as always, only one will take the championship title.

== Contestants ==
Name	Age	Hometown	Occupation	Status	Number of Wins
Thiti Thongborisut	29	Chaiyaphum	Bar Manager	Winner on May 31	8
Newporn Phalang (New)	44	Nonthaburi	Wedding Print Business Owner	Runner-Up on May 31	4
Natchanon Suwan (Tonka)	22	Uthai Thani	Student	Runner-Up on May 31	2
Ploypailin Thongyod (Ploy)	30	Angthong	Content Creator	Runner-Up on May 31; Returned on May 10; Eliminated on March 22	2
Azmi Pattaratadanukul (Mi)	29	Songkhla	IT Technician	Eliminated on May 24	3
Chanchiran Tangsutthitham (Perschae)	39	Chiang Mai	Cosmetics Business Owner	Eliminated on May 24	2
Adisorn Janvijitkul (Tong)	45	Ratchaburi	Photographer	Eliminated on May 24	2
Chatpakorn Chotiam (Bella)	37	Chiang Mai	Showgirl	Eliminated on May 24; Returned on May 10; Eliminated on May 3	3
Papon Paisancharoenwong (Boss)	30	Bangkok	Diamond Shop Businessman	Eliminated on May 3	2
Phatthanaruen Veerapong (Mint)	25	Samut Prakan	Auditor	Eliminated on May 3	2
Supicha Trakarnsapthavee (Pim)	18	Buriram	Student	Eliminated on May 3	4
Napassorn Charoenniti (Ant)	29	Bangkok	Housekeeper	Eliminated on April 26	1
Monthakorn Jeong (Miw)	35	Pathum Thani	Cosmetics Import Business Owner	Eliminated on April 19	2
Thapaneepak Sutthipipit (Tan)	28	Bangkok	Online Trader	Eliminated on April 19	2
Pharakorn Cherdchuen (JC)	23	Bangkok	Student	Eliminated on April 5	1
Pattanithan Sri-iam (Pitch)	41	Nonthaburi	Singing Instructor	Eliminated on April 5	1
Aisawanya Phumilert (Namo)	30	Nong Khai	Advertising Creative	Eliminated on March 29	0
Jitwimon Tiamjan (Bow)	33	Ubon Ratchatani	Musician (Note: The Voice Thailand Season 8 contestant)	Eliminated on March 15	1
Thanatphorn Sriheranukul (Pop)	51	Bangkok	Brand Owner	Eliminated on March 15	0
Sarayut Hathaipattrawong (Prof)	36	Bangkok	Stage Director	Eliminated on March 8	0

== Elimination Table ==
Place	Contestant	Episode																			
Place	Contestant	3/4	4	5		6	7		8		9		10		11		12	13/14			14/15
1	Thiti	PT	WIN	IMM	WIN	WIN	IN	WIN	LOW	WIN	HIGH	IMM	WIN	IMM	HIGH	IN	IMM	IN	WIN	IMM	WINNER
2	New	WIN	IN	IN	IMM	LOW	IN	IMM	LOW	LOW	IN	WIN	IN	HIGH	WIN	IMM	IMM	WIN	IMM		RUNNER-UP
2	Tonka	PT	IN	IMM	HIGH	IN	IN	IN	WIN	IMM	HIGH	IN	IN	IN	IN	IN	IMM	IN	IN	WIN	RUNNER-UP
2	Ploy	WIN	IN	LOW	IMM	ELIM											RET	IN	IN	HIGH	RUNNER-UP
5	Mi	WIN	HIGH	IN	IMM	IN	IN	IN	WIN	IMM	IN	HIGH	IN	IN	IN	WIN	IMM	IN	IN	ELIM	
5	Perschae	WIN	IN	IMM	LOW	WIN	HIGH	IMM	LOW	IN	IN	IN	HIGH	LOW	LOW	HIGH	IMM	IN	IN	ELIM	
5	Tong	PT	IN	IMM	HIGH	WIN	IN	IN	LOW	IN	IN	IN	IN	WIN	IN	IN	IMM	IN	IN	ELIM	
5	Bella	WIN	HIGH	IN	IMM	WIN	HIGH	HIGH	LOW	IN	IN	IMM	IN	IN	LOW	ELIM	RET	IN	IN	ELIM	
9	Boss	LOW	IN	IMM	LOW	WIN	IN	LOW	IN	IMM	WIN	IMM	IN	IN	IN	ELIM					
9	Mint	WIN	IN	IMM	IN	WIN	IN	IMM	LOW	HIGH	IN	IN	HIGH	IN	IN	ELIM					
11	Pim	WIN	HIGH	WIN	IMM	WIN	WIN	IMM	IN	IMM	IN	IN	IN	LOW	ELIM						
12	Ant	LOW	IN	IN	IMM	WIN	IN	LOW	IN	IMM	IN	IMM	IN	ELIM							
13	Miw	WIN	HIGH	IN	IMM	WIN	IN	IN	LOW	IN	IN	ELIM									
13	Tan	PT	IN	IMM	IN	WIN	IN	IMM	WIN	IMM	IN	ELIM									
15	JC	WIN	IN	LOW	IMM	IN	IN	IMM	LOW	ELIM											
15	Pitch	WIN	IN	IMM	IN	IN	IN	IN	LOW	ELIM											
17	Namo	PT	IN	IN	IMM	LOW	IN	ELIM													
18	Bow	WIN	IN	IMM	ELIM																
19	Pop	PT	IN	ELIM																	
20	Prof	ELIM																			

(WINNER) This cook won the competition.
(RUNNER-UP) This contestant finished in second place.
(WIN) The cook won an individual challenge (Mystery Box Challenge, Invention Test or Pressure Test).
(WIN) The cook was on the winning team in the Team Challenge and directly advanced to the next round.
(HIGH) The cook was one of the top entries in an individual challenge, but didn't win.
(HIGH) The cook was one of the top entries in an individual challenge, but wasn't among the top 2 entries.
(IN) The cook wasn't selected as a top or bottom entry in an individual challenge.
(IN) The cook wasn't selected as a top or bottom entry in a team challenge.
(IMM) The cook didn't have to compete in that round of the competition and was safe from elimination.
(PT) The cook competed in the Pressure Test round.
(LOW) The cook was one of the bottom entries in the Team challenge, and must compete in an elimination round.
(LOW) The cook was one of the bottom entries in an individual challenge, but wasn't the last person to advance.
(LOW) The cook was one of the bottom entries in an individual challenge, and the last person to advance.
(LOW) The cook was at the bottom-most entry but saved from elimination.
(ELIM) The cook was eliminated from MasterChef.
(RET) The cook won MasterChef Thailand: The Second Chance spin-off and returned to the competition.

== Episode Titles ==
Episode	Native Title	First aired
1	หนึ่งผ้ากันเปื้อนกับโอกาสเพียงครั้งเดียว	February 15, 2026
2	ออดิชั่นครั้งสุดท้าย	February 22, 2026
3	ก้าวแรกกับภารกิจแบบทีมสุดยิ่งใหญ่	March 1, 2026
4	รสมือสู่รสคุณธรรม	March 8, 2026
5	บททดสอบจาก 3 แชมป์	March 15, 2026
6	ภารกิจทีมเอาตัวรอดจากออเดอร์เรียลไทม์	March 22, 2026
7	ผู้ชนะกุมอำนาจ	March 29, 2026
8	รสชาติที่ช่วยเยียวยา	April 5, 2026
9	บททดสอบแห่งการพลิกโฉม	April 19, 2026
10	แรงบันดาลใจจากทูลกระหม่อม	April 26, 2026
11	คิดให้ทัน ทำให้ไว	May 3, 2026
12	ศึกตัดสินโอกาสครั้งที่สอง	May 10, 2026
13	ทำสิ่งที่เป็นไปได้ยาก ให้เป็นไปได้	May 17, 2026
14	ปะทะเดือดรอบชิง	May 24, 2026
15	ศึกตัดสินครั้งสุดท้าย	May 31, 2026

== Episodes ==
=== Episode 1 ===
Original Airdate: Sunday, 15 February 2026

The season opens by welcoming the first 20 contestants who are chosen to enter MasterChef Kitchen, and rewarded them with loads of appetizers, fruits, and drinks. Shortly while the contestants are celebrating, the judges brought up 10 more contestants, making the total count of 30, to compete against each other for the chance of winning an apron to compete in further challenges.

Auditions (Part 1): In this season, the audition session is split into three rounds, where some will receive the apron immediately after each round. After all three rounds complete, those who haven't received an apron will not be competing in further challenges as an official member of this MasterChef season.

Round 1: Skill Test

For the first round, the 30 contestants are being challenged with their knife skills by slicing 250 grams of galangal. Each slice must not break apart and come out as a perfect circle, with the thickness of no more than 1 mm (millimeter). Those who finishes will have to ring the bell, and the judges will come to examine the galangal for preciseness and weight requirement.

After the first contestant, Prof, passed the galangal challenge, Chef Pom Kwantip brought in the second ingredient, lemongrass. The lemongrass must separate from each other as individual strands, and the thickness must be no more than 1 mm (millimeter). In total, they must present 100 grams of lemongrass to pass to the next challenge. No one can start slicing lemongrass until they passed the galangal challenge.

Then, Chef Ian Kittichai brought in the third and last ingredient for this round, which are kaffir lime leaves. The judges are looking for the width of the leaves to be no more than 1 mm (millimeter), and the contestants must take out the stem in the middle of the leaves. In total, contestants must present 15 grams of perfectly sliced kaffir lime leaves. They cannot start this challenge until they passed the previous 2 challenges, which when this challenge starts, Prof was the first contestant to pass both galangal and lemongrass challenges, so he gets to start first.

The first 6 contestants to pass all three challenges will immediately receive an apron and qualify as the official contestants of this season, while the other contestants must compete in the second round. In the end, JC, Prof, Bow, Thiti, Pitch and Boss were the first 6 to pass all challenges, and they were granted the apron respectively.

- Received the apron: JC, Prof, Bow, Thiti, Pitch and Boss

Round 2: Signature Dish

For the second round of audition, the remaining 24 contestants must create their signature dish to present to the judges, with the total of 1 hour to prepare the dish. They can spend as much time as they want in MasterChef Supermarket, but they will only get to enter once, and equipment for cooking are limited so they have to make sure they are not spending too much time in the supermarket.

- Time: 60 minutes (1 hour)

The 6 contestants that impress the judges the most will receive an apron as the official contestants of the season. After the judges have tasted all 24 dishes, Ploy, Mint, Tong, Mi, Namo and Bella impress the judges with their dishes and received the apron.

- Received the apron: Ploy, Mint, Tong, Mi, Namo and Bella

=== Episode 2 ===
Original Airdate: Sunday, 22 February 2026

Auditions (Part 2): For the remaining 18 contestants, they must perform the best of their ability to get the aprons in the remaining rounds, or else they are eliminated.

Round 3: In this round, the contestants are asked to unfold the umbrellas as the main ingredient rains into them, which appears to be watermelon seeds (or guai-jee). They have 60 minutes to cook a dish, could be savory or sweet, using their creativity to elevate watermelon seeds to a MasterChef worthy presentation. In addition, the contestants must open the seeds by themselves (since the outside shell is not edible), so they must manage their time carefully in this round.

- Time: 60 minutes (1 hour)

The 6 contestants that impress the judges the most will be granted the last set of aprons. As a result, Pop, Miw, Pim, New, Tonka and Ant presented the best dishes and received the apron.

- Received the apron: Pop, Miw, Pim, New, Tonka and Ant

For the remaining contestants, they have unfortunately missed the opportunity to be an official contestant of this season. Until, the judges announced that there are still 2 aprons left, and all 12 contestants agreed to compete in the last round for the chance of winning an apron.

Round 4: 3-Egg Challenge

The last round is a basic skill test of a well-known ingredient: eggs. There are 3 types of eggs the contestants must present: 1 fried egg, 1 soft-boiled egg, and 1 poached egg. For fried egg, the white must be cooked and crispy on the outside, while the yolk is still runny. The soft-boiled egg must be beautifully peeled with no bumpy edges, the white must be cooked thoroughly, and the yolk should be runny as well. Poached egg must maintain its smooth and firm shape, the white must be cooked thoroughly while the yolk is still runny. Each contestant are given 4 eggs in total (which means only 1 spare egg), and 18 minutes to prepare all 3 types of eggs.

- Time: 18 minutes

The 2 best performance will receive the apron in this last chance, and in the end, Perschae and Tan executed the best performance and they were granted the apron as the official contestants in this season. Unfortunately for the remaining 10 contestants, they are sent home.

- Received the apron: Perschae and Tan
- Eliminated: Nana, Geo, Aekkung, Palm, Smiletae, Yub, A, Pree, Wi and Mowri

=== Episode 3 ===
Original Airdate: Sunday, 1 March 2026

Team Challenge 1: DIT x MasterChef - Local Ingredients, World-Class Experiences

- Location: Ministry of Commerce, Nonthaburi

For the first challenge of the season as the official contestants, they have arrived at the Ministry of Commerce, which is the center of Thailand's domestic and international trade that monitors agricultural price and economic indices. They also get to meet with 3 special guests, including Minister Suphajee Suthumpun of the Ministry of Commerce, the ministry's Permanent Secretary, Mr. Vuttikrai Leewiraphan, and the Director-General of DIT, Mr. Wittayakorn Maneenetr. Mrs. Suphajee receives the honor of presenting the concept of this week's team challenge, and that is "DIT x MasterChef - Local Ingredients, World-Class Experiences".

- Special Guests: Minister Suphajee Suthumpun, Mr. Vuttikrai Leewiraphan, and Mr. Wittayakorn Maneenetr

She also presented 3 main ingredients for this challenge, which are Songkhla Lake (sam num) sea bass, Phulae pineapple from Chiang Rai, and varieties of Thai rice (khao praneat). Each team will have to elevate these Thai local ingredients to 2-course fine-dining dishes, where they must use the sea bass and rice to create a savory (main course) dish, and pineapple for a dessert dish. These courses will be served to 101 guest judges, including high-level executives, Ministry of Commerce staffs, Thai farmers, and media. Both teams are given 2 hours and 30 minutes to complete their main course and serve to the guests, plus another 15 minutes for dessert to be served.

- Preparation time (Main Course): 2 hours and 30 minutes
- Service time (+ additional time for Dessert): 15 minutes

Although the contestants have not known each other for long, they must communicate as a team to execute the best presentation of today's challenge for the guest judges. As the first 2 contestants to receive the apron in this season, JC and Prof got the honor to be the team captains for this team challenge. JC gets to choose his teammate first because he was the first one, then Prof. In the end, the team distribution is as follows:

Team Captain	Members
JC	Bella, Pitch, Bow, Mi, Pim, Ploy, Mint, New and Miw
Prof	Namo, Thiti, Perschae, Boss, Tonka, Tong, Ant, Pop and Tan

During the preparation time however, Chef Pom and Chef Ian discovered the lack of communication among both team captains, to the extent that they have decided to switch team captains for both teams. In the last 60 minutes of the challenge, Chef Ian swap Tong as the captain for Red team, while Chef Pom swap Pitch as the captain for Blue team.

- New captain for Red team: Tong
- New captain for Blue team: Pitch

After the time is up for service, the guest judges vote for the best dish for main course and dessert. As a result, Blue team won with a score of 136 to 66 points.

- Winning team: Blue team

Pressure Test 1: Since Red team lost the team challenge, they will be facing Pressure Test round that tests their preciseness and accuracy. Due to M.L. Pasan's absence, the judges bring in a guest judge for the next 2 rounds, which is Chef Ton Thitid, Thailand's only chef with a Michelin star for 2 owned restaurants, including Le Du and Nusara.

- Guest Judge: Chef Ton - Thitid Tassanakajohn

In this round, the 10 contestants must replicate a royal Thai snack, kanom khang khao (Taro Bats). The recipe that the show brings in is from Sa Pathum Palace, which uses khao mao (flattened rice) instead of taro as the main component. The criteria are as follows:

1. The shape of each piece must be identical in size, with each pinched into a triangular pyramid (like a bat spreading its wings).
2. The outer dough must be perfectly thin and crispy, not greasy, while the inside is chewy and fragrant with the aroma from pounded, flattened rice.
3. The filling should not be soggy, and perfectly balanced in flavor with sam kler (coriander roots, garlic, and peppercorn) and kaffir lime leaves fragrance.
4. Ajad (Thai cucumber salad) must be well-balanced in flavor, and the amount of vegetables must balance with the dressing.

To assist the contestants with this dish, Chef Pom demonstrated the cooking process, with a sample for them to taste and analyze the flavor. The contestants will have 1 hour to replicate this dish to the best of their ability with a recipe also given to them.

- Time: 60 minutes (1 hour)

The competition and result of this round were broadcast in Episode 4. After the judges have tasted all dishes, Perschae executed the best kanom khang khao and is the first to qualify. Unfortunately, Prof made the most mistakes and is sent home.

- Round winner: Perschae
- Bottom three: Prof, Boss and Ant
- Eliminated: Prof

=== Episode 4 ===
Original Airdate: Sunday, 8 March 2026

Mystery Box 1: Taste of Virtue

In this round, all 19 contestants must cook a dish out of the ingredients in the mystery box. The box contains pork belly, chicken wings, white shrimp, tofu skin, all-purpose flour, potato, asparagus, kabocha squash, melinjo, baby carrot, mixed berry, lady finger banana, pomegranate, rosemary, fermented fish, and the main ingredient, instant noodles. The contestants must try to interpret the challenge themselves under the theme "Taste of Virtue" that must be represented in their dish. They have 60 minutes to prepare the dish with limited additional ingredients and seasonings available for them to use.

- Time: 60 minutes (1 hour)

After the judges tasted all dishes, 5 contestants are among the best dishes in this round, a record-breaking number that has never happened before in any Mystery Box challenges. Out of the 5 best dishes, Thiti impressed the judges the most and granted immunity for the next round.

- Five best dishes: Bella, Mi, Miw, Pim and Thiti
- Round winner: Thiti

=== Episode 5 ===
Original Airdate: Sunday, 15 March 2026

Invention Test 1: In this round, Thiti gets the advantage of picking the main ingredients for the remaining contestants in MasterChef Supermarket. There are three boxes to choose from, each contains the first main ingredient, fish sauce. The first box has the second main ingredient of pen shells, and the second box has geoduck as the second main ingredient. The third box reveals to be Thiti's opportunity to save 8 contestants to immune with him in this round. For the remaining 10 contestants, Thiti can choose 5 contestants for each of the 2 boxes for them to cook with. In the end, he chooses the following:

Main Ingredient	Contestants
Pen shells	Ant, Pop, Namo, New and Ploy
Geoduck	JC, Mi, Bella, Miw and Pim

- Saved: Bow, Pitch, Boss, Mint, Tong, Tonka, Perschae and Tan

The contestants gets 60 minutes for this round, and one will be eliminated.

- Time: 60 minutes (1 hour)

As a result, Pim executed the best performance and becomes the winner of this round. Unfortunately, Pop wasn't able to finish plating her dish on time and is eliminated.

- Round winner: Pim
- Bottom three: Ploy, Pop and JC
- Eliminated: Pop

Elimination Test: For this special round, Thiti and the 8 saved contestants will have to compete against each other, where one will be eliminated. The 9 remaining contestants that competed in the last round are saved for the week.

The judges then brought in 3 special guests who will be giving the challenge out to the contestants. They are the champions from each MasterChef seasons, including Chef Zetrong from Season 6, Chef First from Season 2, and Chef Toei from The Professionals season.

- Special guests: Chef Zetrong - Valasura Na Lampang, Chef First - Thanapat Suyao, and Chef Toei - Saharat Taengthai

Each chef has prepared their dishes out of the theme "Esan Fine-Dining", with the combination of each chef's identity into their own signature. As the winner from last round, the judges give Pim the opportunity to assign each of the dishes for all 9 contestants competing. Her final selection, and the components in each dish, are as follows:

Chefs	Chef Zetrong	Chef First	Chef Toei
Menu	4 Canapés	Moden Isan-Style Grilled Pork Neck	Beef Tongue Oom Stew with Pla-ra Lon sauce
Components	Shrimp miang salad; Golden pouch koi; Krathong thong with od krabok; Khao jee with eggplant jaew dip	Pork sausage roulade with grilled pork neck namtok filling; Jeow bong with salmon negi; Khao jee caramel; Som tam compressed vegetables; Lime powder snow	Beef tongue oom stew; Tilapia mok terrine; Pla-ra lon sauce; Eggplant soup purée; Lime powder caviar; Dill oil
Contestants that received the dish	Perschae, Tonka and Mint	Tong, Bow and Tan	Thiti, Boss and Pitch

The contestants will have 60 minutes to self-study and recreate the dish with preciseness and accuracy, and they only have approximately 5 minutes to select the correct ingredients by themselves in MasterChef Supermarket.

- Time: 60 minutes (1 hour)

After the judges tasted all the dishes, Pock Piyathida announces that the 3 dishes with the most problems are Tonka, Tong, and Thiti. The problem is, they are the 3 best dishes of this round. The judges tasted their dishes once again, and come to a conclusion that Thiti did the best performance, Tonka in second.

- Three best dishes: Tonka, Tong and Thiti
- Round winner: Thiti

Unfortunately, there are also contestants who aren't able to recreate the chefs' dishes close to the original, and in the end, Bow scored the least and is eliminated.

- Bottom three: Perschae, Boss and Bow
- Eliminated: Bow

=== Episode 6 ===
Original Airdate: Sunday, 22 March 2026

Team Challenge 2: In this week's team challenge, the contestants will be facing a delivery service challenge, similar to the challenge given in the 10th episode of All-Stars season. They were taken to Ratchaburi Grand Canyon in Ratchaburi, which is 30 kilometers away from its city area.

- Location: Ratchaburi Grand Canyon, Ratchaburi

The delivery platform that the show uses is through ShopeeFood, serving for 101 Ratchaburi residents who will judge the contestants through their delivered meal. Contestants are given a bento box with 5 sections, where each box costs 129 baht. Each team will have 2 hours and 30 minutes to prepare and serve the food, and they must have a sample meal to publish to the platform by the first 30 minutes of the challenge.

- Total time: 2 hours and 30 minutes
- Time for sample meal: 30 minutes

Since Thiti won first place in the Elimination Test last week, and Tonka came second, they will be the team captains for this team challenge. Thiti will get to choose a teammate first, and the teams are as follows:

Team Captain	Members
Thiti	Tong, Miw, Boss, Bella, Pim, Perschae, Tan, Ant
Tonka	Namo, Mi, JC, Pitch, Ploy, Mint, New

Out of 101 residents, 69 ordered Red team's meal while 32 ordered Blue team's. However, Red team were only able to complete 39 orders, while Blue team was able to finish packing all of them. After the service time is over, the 101 residents rated the meal they ordered based on how satisfied they are with the food, given the score from 0-3. As a result, Blue team won Red team with a score of 88 to 85.

- Winning team: Blue team

Invention Test 2: Since Red team lost the team challenge, they will have to compete against each other in this round. The main ingredient for this challenge are Cosmic Crisp apples imported from the United States, which have unique white spots like cosmic stars, and has a sweet flavor and crispy texture. The contestants will have 45 minutes to make any type of dish out of it that can stun the judges.

- Time: 45 minutes

In the end, after the judges tasted all dishes, Mint presented the best dish and wins the round. On the other hand, Ploy's dish scored the least and was eliminated.

- Round winner: Mint
- Bottom three: Namo, Ploy and New
- Eliminated: Ploy

=== Episode 7 ===
Original Airdate: Sunday, 29 March 2026

Mystery Box 2: This week's Mystery Box challenge comes with the theme of healthy food, where all the ingredients are beneficial for a person's health. The main ingredient is whole grain oats, and additional ingredients including salmon, white tofu, eggs, shrimp, shrimp roe, king oyster mushroom, spinach, broccoli, sunflower sprouts, miso paste, mint leaves, pistachio, and banana. Contestants will have 60 minutes to prepare their best oats dish for the judges.

- Time: 60 minutes (1 hour)

After the judges tasted all the dishes, Pim wins the round as the best dish and granted herself immunity.

- Three best dishes: Bella, Pim and Perschae
- Round winner: Pim

Invention Test 3: In this round, the remaining contestants are given the main ingredient: coconut milk. They will be assigned to cook either a savory dish, or a Thai dessert dish. The privilege to assign these to each contestant falls under Pim, who won the previous round. She chose Miw, Pitch, Mi, Thiti, and Boss for savory, and assigned Bella, Tonka, Tong, Ant, and Namo for Thai dessert. For the rest that did not get assigned, Pim chose to save them for the week. The 10 contestants who were assigned the challenge will have 60 minutes to create a dish to the best of their ability.

- Saved: JC, Mint, New, Perschae and Tan
- Time: 60 minutes (1 hour)

In the end, after the judges tasted all the dishes, Thiti presented the best dish, Bella in second place. Sadly, Namo's dish scored the least and was sent home.

- Round winner: Thiti
- Bottom three: Boss, Ant and Namo
- Eliminated: Namo

=== Episode 8 ===
Original Airdate: Sunday, 5 April 2026

Team Challenge 3: Ch7HD x Rajavithi Hospital

At the start of this episode, the contestants were stunned as they walk into a hospital-themed MasterChef Kitchen. For this team challenge, they will have to design a menu for the opportunity to be featured at Rajavithi Hospital, in regards to the hospital's collaboration with Channel 7 and Heliconia H Group. The dishes they create must meet all the dietary requirements for people with non-communicable diseases (or NCDs) in order to pass the challenge. The special guests that will be judging today's challenge including Dr. Pairoj Khruekarnchana, the hospital's Deputy Director for Medical Affairs, alongside nutrients, doctors, nurses, and executives of Ch7HD. In total, there are 32 guests for today's team challenge.

In this challenge, contestants are split into 5 different teams. Since Thiti wins the last round and Bella came in second, they will get the opportunity to choose their own teammates. Thiti chose Tong and Mint to join his team, while Bella chose Miw and JC to join her team. In addition, both of them got to choose who gets to be in the other 3 teams. The final team distributions are as follows:

Teams	Members
Red team	**Mi**, Tonka, Tan
Yellow team	**Pim**, Boss, Ant
Orange team	**Perschae**, Pitch, New
Green team	**Thiti**, Mint, Tong
Purple team	**Bella**, Miw, JC

Note: team captains are in bold.

Each team are provided with different set of ingredients to cook with, depending on which color station they have chosen. All ingredient boxes have provided with the exact amounts of nutrition that are appropriate for every NCDs patient's one meal. Alongside different types of fruits and vegetables, it has contained the following ingredients:

Ingredient Proportions for Patients with NCDs in 1 meal, per person
Categories	Ingredient (& amount)				
Protein	Fish (140 grams)	Chicken breast (135 grams)	Pork sirloin (skin off) (135 grams)	Egg tofu (240 grams)	1 whole egg + egg whites (120 grams)
Carbohydrate	Cooked rice (110 grams)	Cooked noodles (120 grams)	Taro (120 grams)	Potato (100 grams)	All-purpose flour (70 grams)
Seasonings	**Sweetness**		**Saltiness**		—N/a
Seasonings	Sugar (5 grams)	Honey (5 grams)	Fish sauce (low sodium) (5 mL)	Salt (0.75 grams)	—N/a

Teams will have to create 2 different dishes in 90 minutes for all special guests and judges to taste. Each guest have 3 coupons to vote on the teams they are satisfied with the most, and 2 teams with the most number of votes will have their dishes featured at Rajavithi Hospital, and will also be saved for the week.

- Time: 90 minutes

In the end, Red team won with 38 points, and Yellow team in second place with 19 points. The remaining 3 teams that did not win will have to face the next round that will eliminate at least one contestant.

- Winning team: Red team
- Teams facing elimination: Orange, Green, and Purple team

Invention Test 4: In this round, the 9 contestants that lost the team challenge will have to create a dessert that has jelly as the main component, and they must work with the main ingredient, agar powder. Contestants have 1 hour to create their best jelly dessert dish.

- Time: 60 minutes (1 hour)

After the judges have tasted all dishes, Thiti presented the best jelly dessert, Mint came in second. On the other hand, Pitch and JC miscalculated the proportions of agar powder in their dish, which cost them elimination.

- Round winner: Thiti
- Bottom three: New, Pitch and JC
- Eliminated: Pitch and JC

=== Episode 9 ===
Original Airdate: Sunday, 19 April 2026

Mystery Box 3: For this week's Mystery Box challenge, contestants have to elevate a classic street food, kway chap (or rolled noodles), into a creative, luxurious dish. They are given a set of Western and premium ingredients to work with, including button mushrooms, brussels sprout, baby carrots, parsley, king crab legs, Australian beef, truffle, caviar, saffron, brie cheese, and gold leaves. They have 60 minutes to present their best version of a premium kway chap dish.

- Time: 60 minutes (1 hour)

As a result, Boss wins the round and granted himself immunity for the week.

- Three best dishes: Thiti, Tonka and Boss
- Round winner: Boss

Invention test 5: In this round, the remaining contestants have to add value to Isan sausage in their dish, which is also the main ingredient for this challenge. There's also the second main ingredient, and the fate falls under Boss who gets to decide which ingredient each contestant have to work with. They have 60 minutes to cook a dish combining both main ingredients together, and both main ingredients must be perfectly balanced. Eventually, Boss assigned the following:

Ingredient #2	Contestants
Parmesan cheese	Ant, Tan, New and Perschae
Miso paste	Miw, Bella, Mi and Mint
Durian	Thiti, Tonka, Tong and Pim

- Time: 60 minutes (1 hour)

During the round, the host Pock Piyathida announced the last advantage Boss have: he gets to choose one contestant per category to be safe with him for the week, in total of 3 contestants. He picked Ant, Bella, and Thiti to immune with him.

- Saved: Ant, Bella and Thiti

The remaining contestants that did not get picked will have to continue competing in the round. After the judges tasted all dishes, New presented the best dish, Mi came in second. Unfortunately, Tan's ravioli and Miw's pot pie pastry were undercooked, resulting in both of them eliminated.

- Round winner: New
- Eliminated: Tan and Miw

=== Episode 10 ===
Original Airdate: Sunday, 26 April 2026

Inspiration Challenge: For this challenge, the 11 standing contestants will be creating their own dish from an inspiration of a special guest's favorite dish. The special guest in this round is Princess Ubolratana Rajakanya Sirivadhana Barnavadi, presenting and demonstrating the cooking process of her royal highness version of corn fritters. The contestants are rewarded with corn fritters that they can taste and use the recipe to adapt to their own innovative version of her royal highness's corn fritters. They will have 60 minutes to create their own corn fritter inspired, MasterChef-worthy dish to the best of their abilities.

- Time: 60 minutes (1 hour)

While the three judges are the ones who tasted all contestants' dishes and determine the three best dishes in this round, the final tasting of those three selected are honored entirely to her royal highness. After dishes from Mint, Perschae, and Thiti are tasted up front, her royal highness has scored Thiti's dish the most points and wins the challenge.

- Three best dishes: Mint, Perschae and Thiti
- Round winner: Thiti

Invention Test 6:

=== Episode 11 ===
Original Airdate: Sunday, 3 May 2026

=== Episode 12: The Second Chance ===
Original Airdate: Sunday, 10 May 2026

=== Episode 13-14: Semi-Final ===
Original Airdate: Sunday, 17 & 24 May 2026

=== Episode 14-15: Finale ===
Original Airdate: Sunday, 24 & 31 May 2026

== MasterChef Thailand: The Second Chance ==
For this season's reinstation challenge, the show introduced a series of competition in a spin-off of MasterChef Thailand: The Second Chance. This special series were aired through MasterChef Thailand's YouTube channel every Thursday beginning on April 2, 2026.

Format: Each eliminated contestants, in order, will be battling one-on-one to find the ultimate winner to return to the competition in the Semi-Final round. In each round, the contestant that wins the battle will go against the following eliminated contestants, and it keeps on going until the last group that determines who returns to the competition. The contestant(s) that lost each round will have to conclude their journey in this season.

Results: Here are the results from each match.

Day Released	Challenge	Main Ingredient(s)	Cooking time (total)	Special "gift"	Contestants	
Episode 1 2 April 2026	Creating a dish that is more special than the opponent.	Chicken feet	30 minutes	Dark chocolate given the last 10 minutes to use with chicken feet	Pop	Prof
Episode 2 9 April 2026	Creating a dish that is more special than the opponent.	Coconut milk	~~30 minutes~~ 19 minutes (Note: In the second episode, the initial time given was 30 minutes. However, because the "special gift" was the timer, their total cooking time was deducted to 19 minutes.)	A timer given the last 20 minutes, cutting their cooking time to 9 minutes remaining	Bow	Pop
—N/a 16 April 2026	Was postponed due to the Songkran festival					
Episode 3 23 April 2026	Creating a dish that is more special than the opponent.	Tomato	30 minutes	Breadsticks (snack) given the last 15 minutes to use with tomatoes	Ploy	Bow
Episode 4 30 April 2026	Creating a dish that is more special than the opponent.	Duck breast	30 minutes	Espuma given the last 15 minutes; must use it in at least one component	Ploy	Namo
Episode 5 7 May 2026	Creating a signature dish that can be featured at their restaurants in the future.	Chicken leg quarters (chopped)	30 minutes	Thai clay stove must use it in the remaining 15 minutes, where all gas supplies from stoves and ovens are cut off	Ploy	Pitch JC

The contestant wins the round and qualifies to the next round.
The contestant lost the round and was eliminated.
The contestant wins the series and returns to the competition.

Note: This spin-off shows only the first half of the reinstation challenge. The remaining portions of the competition are broadcast through Episode 12 of the main series.
