= Money bag =

Bag or sack used to hold money or gold

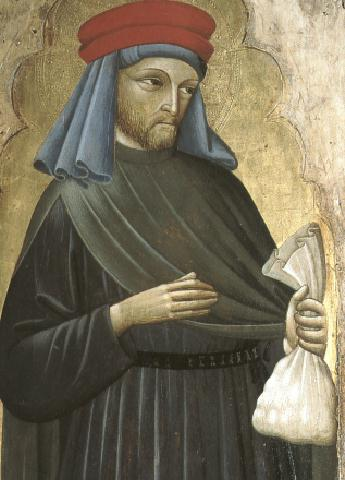
The attributes of 12th century merchant Saint Homobonus include a bag of money

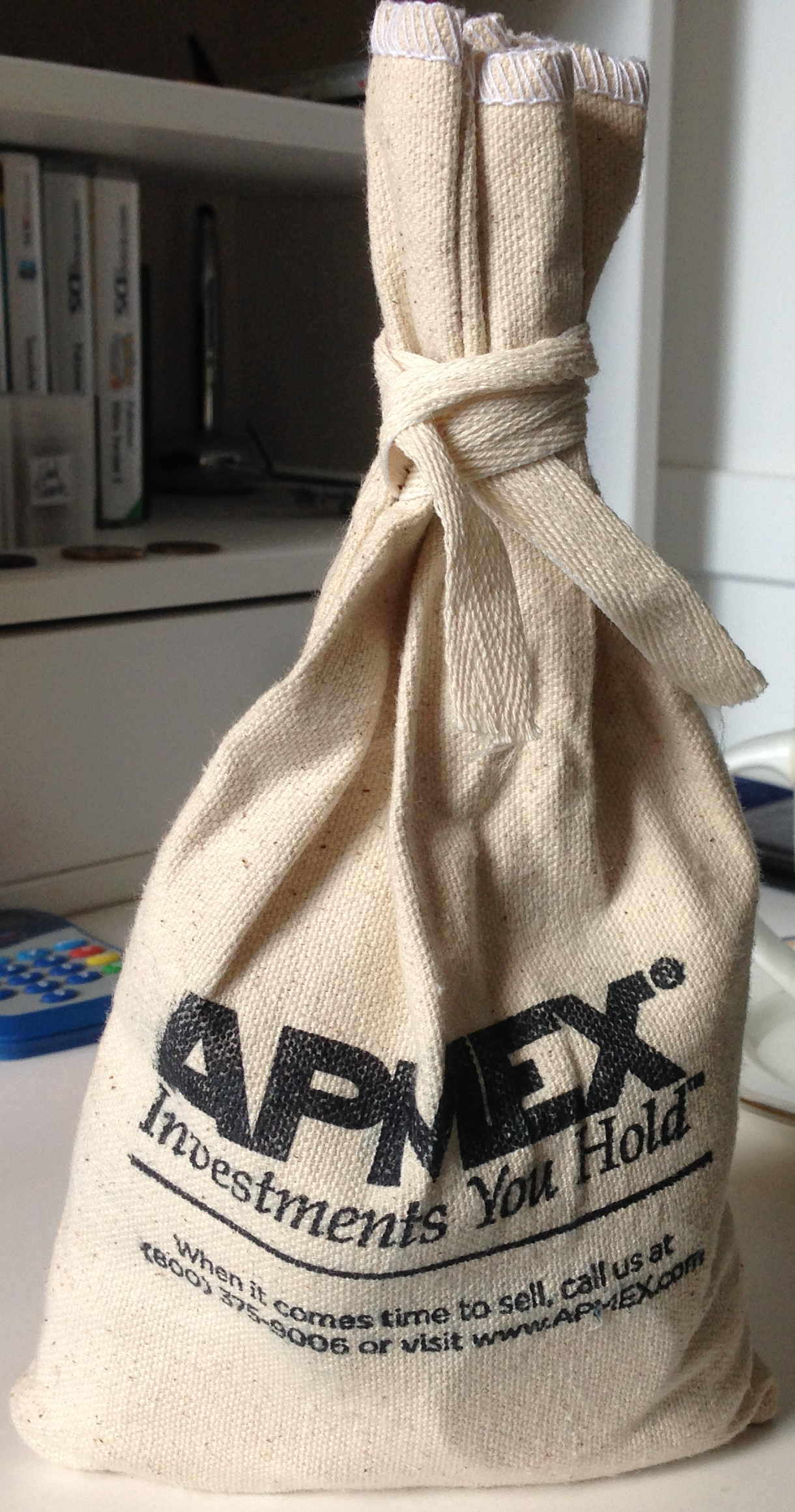
An example of a drawstring money bag from APMEX. The bag is secured by tying or twisting the two cotton drawstrings together.

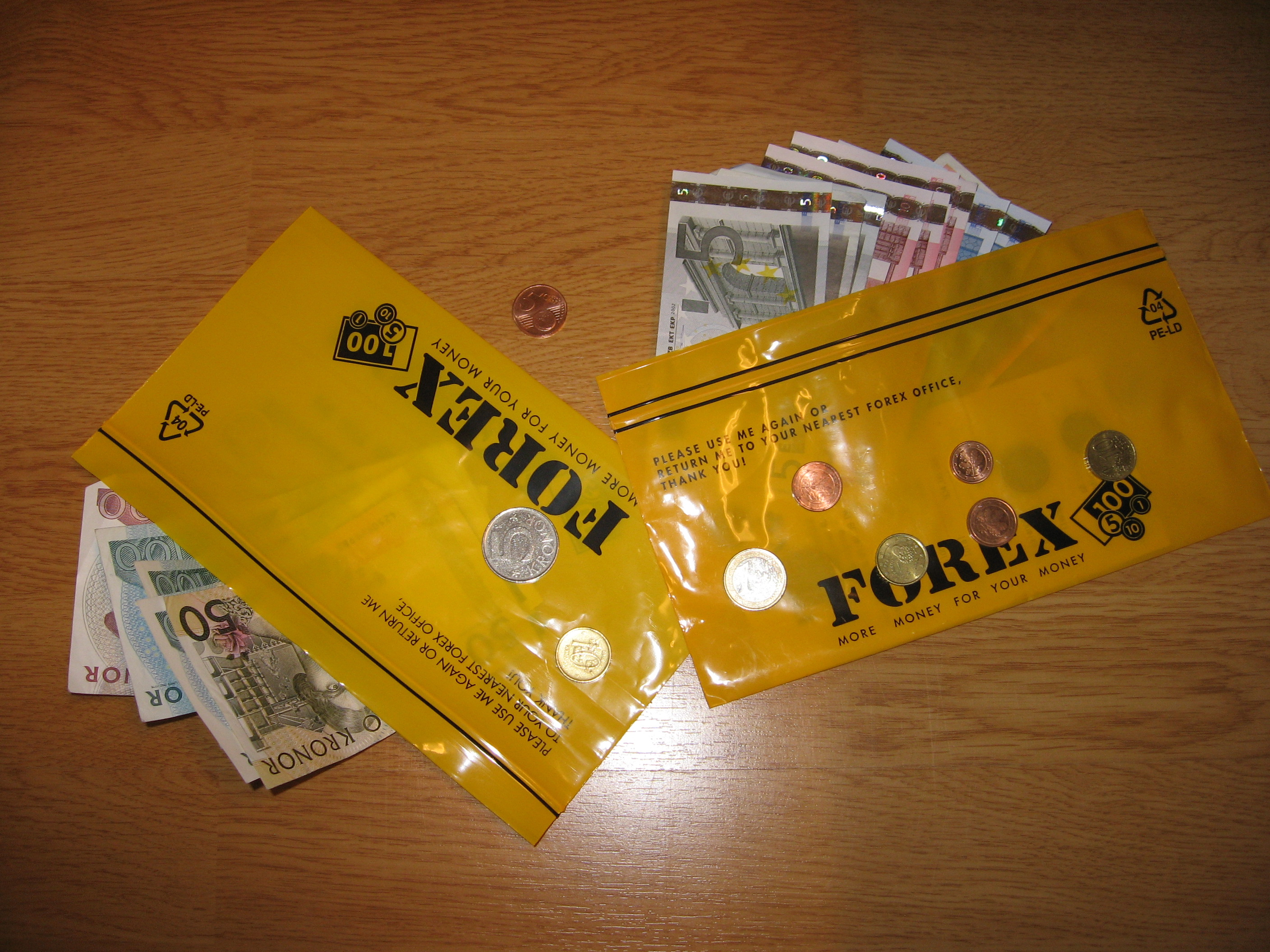
Money in a bag from the Nordic foreign exchange company Forex Bank

A money bag (or money sack) is a bag normally used to hold and transport coins and banknotes, often closed with a drawstring. When transported between banks and other institutions, money bags are usually moved in armored cars or money trains. It is a type of currency packaging. Money bags are often portrayed in cartoons and other light popular culture.

== History ==
According to the account given in the Bible's Gospel of John, Judas Iscariot carried the disciples' money bag.

During the Roman era, the Legio IV Scythica was camped in Zeugma, a city of Commagene (modern-day Turkey). Excavations carried out in the city have revealed 65,000 seal imprints in clay, known as bullae, found in a place which is believed to have served as the archives for the customs of Zeugma. The seal imprints used in sealing papyrus, parchment, moneybags, and customs bales are good indications of the volume of trade and the density of transportation and communication networks once established in the region.

Charon's obols, a death custom originating in ancient Greece whereby a coin is placed with a corpse, from the 3rd and 4th centuries AD in Western Europe, were often found in pouches, making them money pouches.

From the Middle Ages to around 1900, Rottweiler dogs were used by travelling butchers at markets to guard money pouches tied around their necks.

Beginning in the 14th century, purses of money (panakizhi) were awarded to scholars during the Revathi Pattathanam, an annual assembly of scholars held in Kerala, India. In 16th century feudal Japan, samurai wore uchi-bukuro ('money purses') around the waist or neck.

In 1620, pediatric tracheotomy was unheard of until a boy tried to hide a bag of gold by swallowing it. It became lodged in his esophagus and blocked his trachea. The tracheotomy allowed the surgeon to manipulate the bag, and it passed through his system.

In September 1864, Rose O'Neal Greenhow, a Confederate agent, drowned with a bag of gold around her neck after leaving the Condor (a British blockade runner ship) in a boat.

== Nickname ==
A wealthy person can have the nickname "moneybag" (or "moneybags").

Marcus Licinius Crassus (c. 115–53 BC), a leading Roman politician in his day, was known in Rome as Dives, meaning "the Rich" or "Moneybags". Ivan I of Moscow (r. 1325–1340) was a Russian grand prince who received the sobriquet Kalita ("Moneybag"). American cardinal Francis Spellman (1889–1967) was sometimes called "Cardinal Moneybags" in his later life, while Chicago mobster and racketeer Murray Humphreys (1899–1965) was referred to as "Mr. Moneybags" by his friends. James Edward "Baron of Edgerton" Hanson's (1922–2004) billion-dollar empire earned him the nickname "Lord Moneybags".

In fiction, Miss Moneybags (played by Edna Purviance) is a character in the 1915 Charlie Chaplin silent comedy film The Count. Victor Newman (Eric Braeden) of The Young and the Restless soap opera, has also been called "Moneybags".

== In popular culture ==
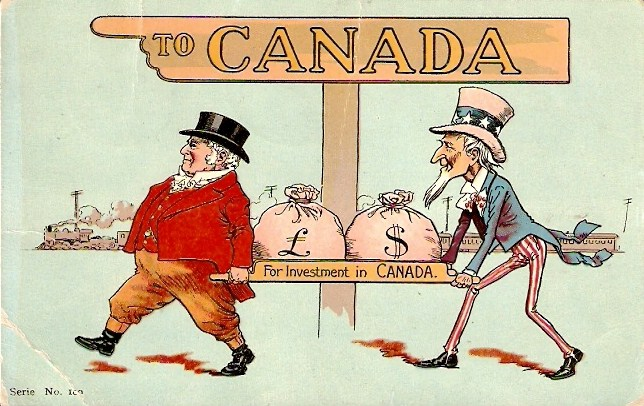
Postcard (postmarked 1907) depicting John Bull and Uncle Sam under sign "To Canada" bringing in sacks of money "for investment in Canada"

Money bags have been represented in art and culture throughout human history, including paintings, literature, film, television, games, and even food.

- A leno, a stock character in the theatre of ancient Rome (1st century BC to 5th century AD), is often depicted carrying a money bag.
- Jainism sculpture (c.10th-11th centuries AD) shows various Jain gods (Yaksa Sarvanubhuti) and/or their attendants/servants, holding money bags (chowrie, noli), purses (nakulika), or "purse-like objects" Buddhist (Pañcika and Vaiśravaṇa/Jambhala) and Hindu (Kubera) deities/gods/goddesses have money bags (or purses or their equivalent--"bag/sheath of jewels", etc.) as part of their iconography.
- Around 1130, Hugh of St. Victor's Chronica's preface refers to a money bag (sacculus or sacculum in Latin), with its compartments, as a memory training analogy.
- The Conjurer, a c. 1502 painting by Hieronymus Bosch, features a child stealing a money purse from a bespectacled character.

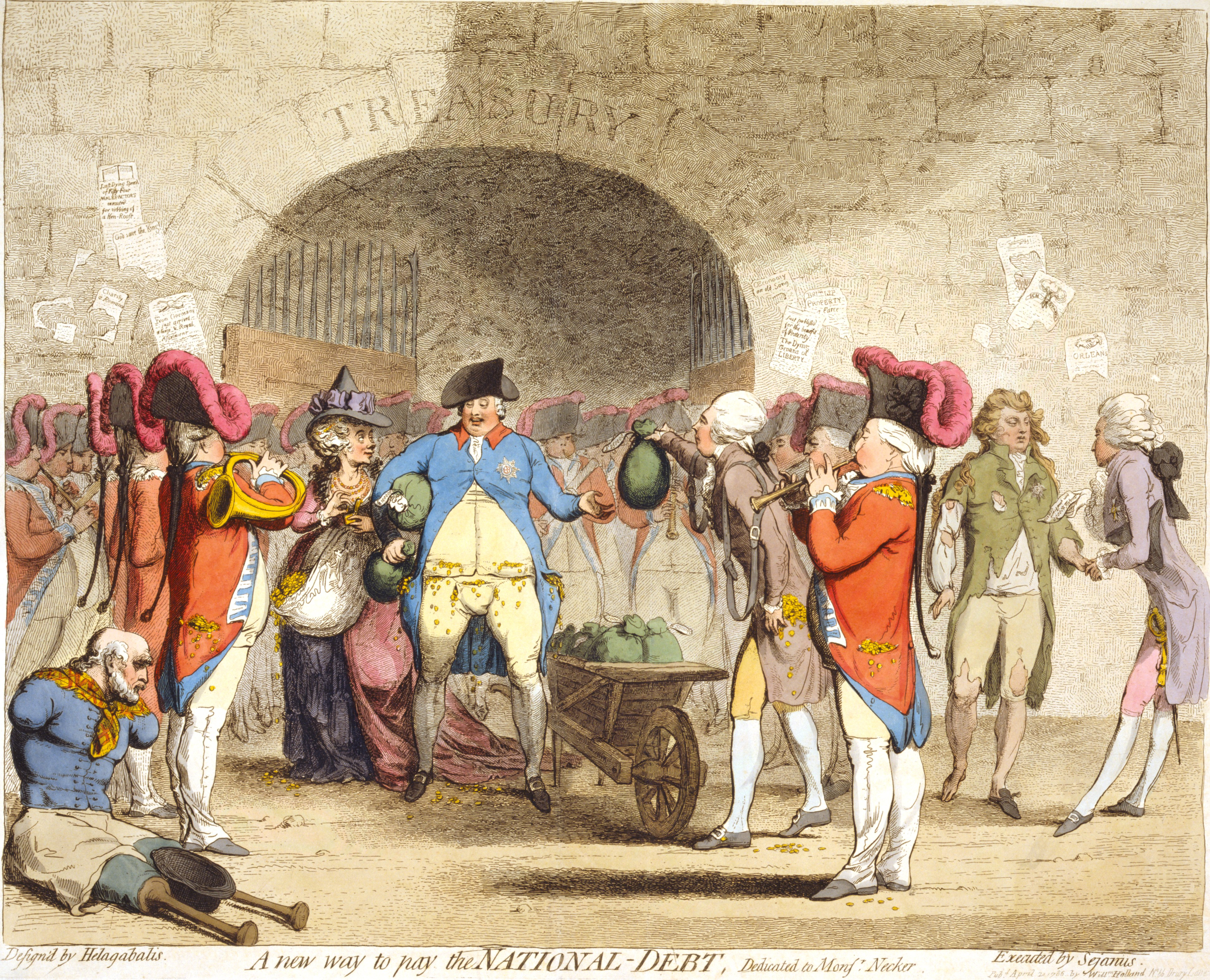
In A new way to pay the National Debt (1786), James Gillray caricatured King George III and Queen Charlotte awash with treasury funds to cover royal debts, with William Pitt handing him another moneybag.

- Around 1791, James Gillray published a cartoon about reaction to the Boydell Shakespeare Gallery labelled "Boydell sacrificing the Works of Shakespeare to the Devil of Money-Bags".
- The Apotheosis of Washington (1865), a fresco in the dome in the rotunda of the United States Capitol Building that contains a commerce scene with the Roman god Mercury holding a bag of gold.
- The obverse 1896 US Educational Series $2 bill shows an allegorical figure of Commerce who has a bag of money next to her, making it a picture of a bag of money on real money.
- A Bag of Gold (1915), film starring Sidney Ainsworth
- In 1974, Herb Block produced Herblock Special Report, a book of political cartoons and text about Richard Nixon with some cartoons featuring money bags.
- Money for Nothing (1993), comedy/crime film about Joey Coyle (John Cusack) who finds $1.2 million dollars in a bag in the middle of the street after it falls out of the back of an armored car
- The Black Book (1993), crime novel by Ian Rankin about "Operation Moneybags", a police investigation aimed at putting a money-lender out of business
- 29 Palms (2002), direct-to-video film about a bag of money that affects the characters who possess it
- Thai money bag (tung tong, or toong tong, ถุงทอง), a small, crispy, deep-fried pastry purse [shaped like a money bag] with various filling (circa unknown)
- In the South Park in episode "Two Days Before the Day After Tomorrow" (2005), a typically-antisemitic Cartman tries to stop Kyle at gunpoint, demanding the latter give up his bag of "Jew gold". It turns out that Kyle not only has a bag of gold (which he wears round his neck at all times), but a decoy bag as well.
- Dean Accessories makes a handbag from recycled decommissioned US mint money bags.

=== In games ===
A "bag of money" icon

The 1976 television game show Break the Bank had a money bag as a space and The Price Is Right has a pricing game called "Balance Game".

In various games, money bags (or bags of gold) tend to be used to represent treasure or points. In board games like Dungeon! (1975) a money bag is a treasure card, in Talisman (1983) as a card, and in Monopoly as a pawn/piece introduced in 1999.

Video games such as Lock 'n' Chase (1981), Bagman (1982), Pitfall! (1982), Digger (1983), Bank Panic (1984), Circus Charlie (1984), Gunfright (1985), Roller Coaster (1985), Arm Wrestling (1985), the Castlevania series (1986-2010+), and Robin Hood: The Legend of Sherwood (2002) have money bags (or bags of gold) in them. As video game characters, Moneybags is a character in the Spyro the Dragon series and a boss named Moneybags in Dual Hearts.

== See also ==
- Currency packaging
- Handbag
- Money belt
- Coin purse
- Digital currency
- Wallet
- Money
- World currency
