= Currency packaging =

Methods of grouping cash for transfer and storage

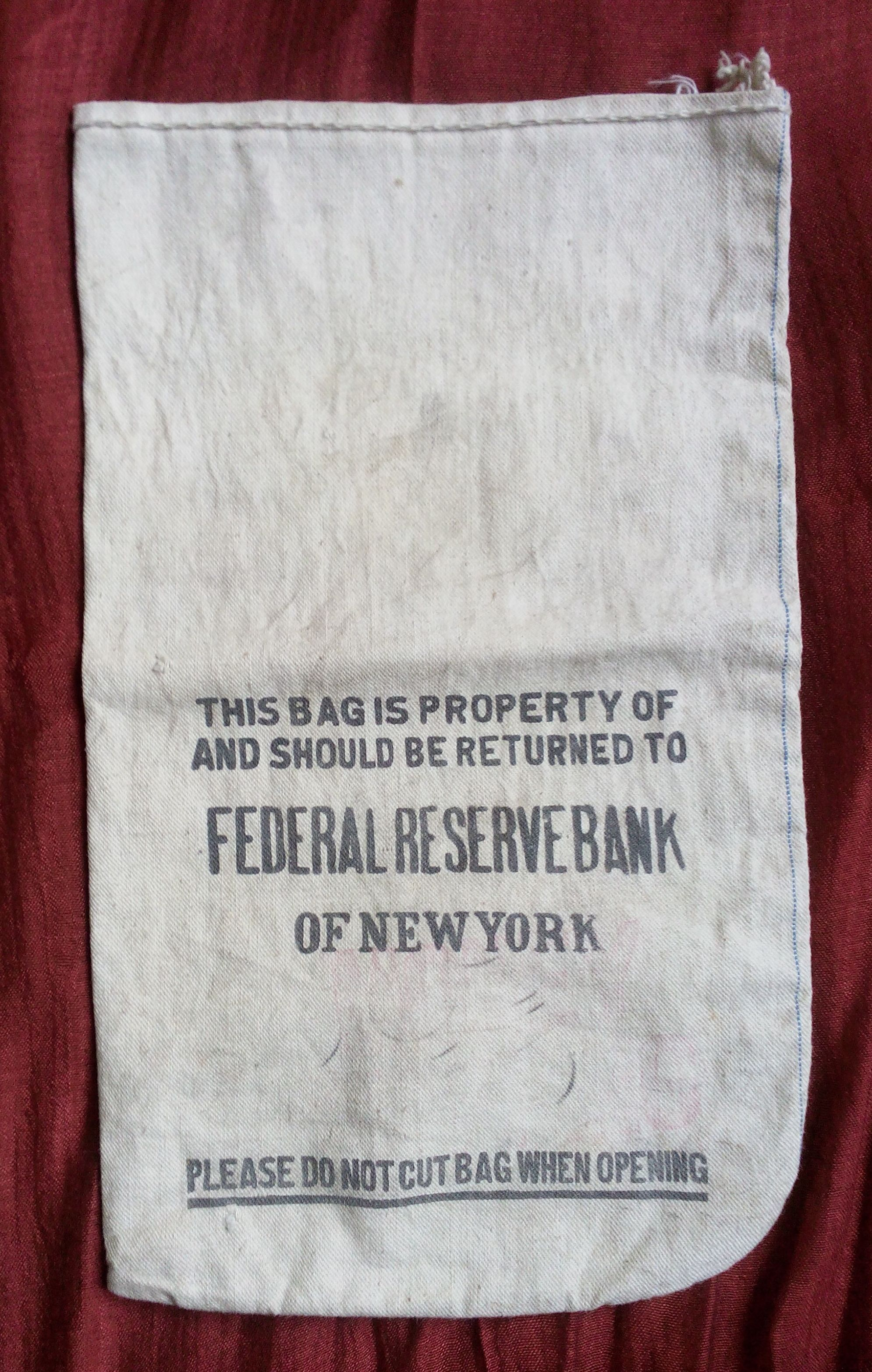
Fabric bag for money

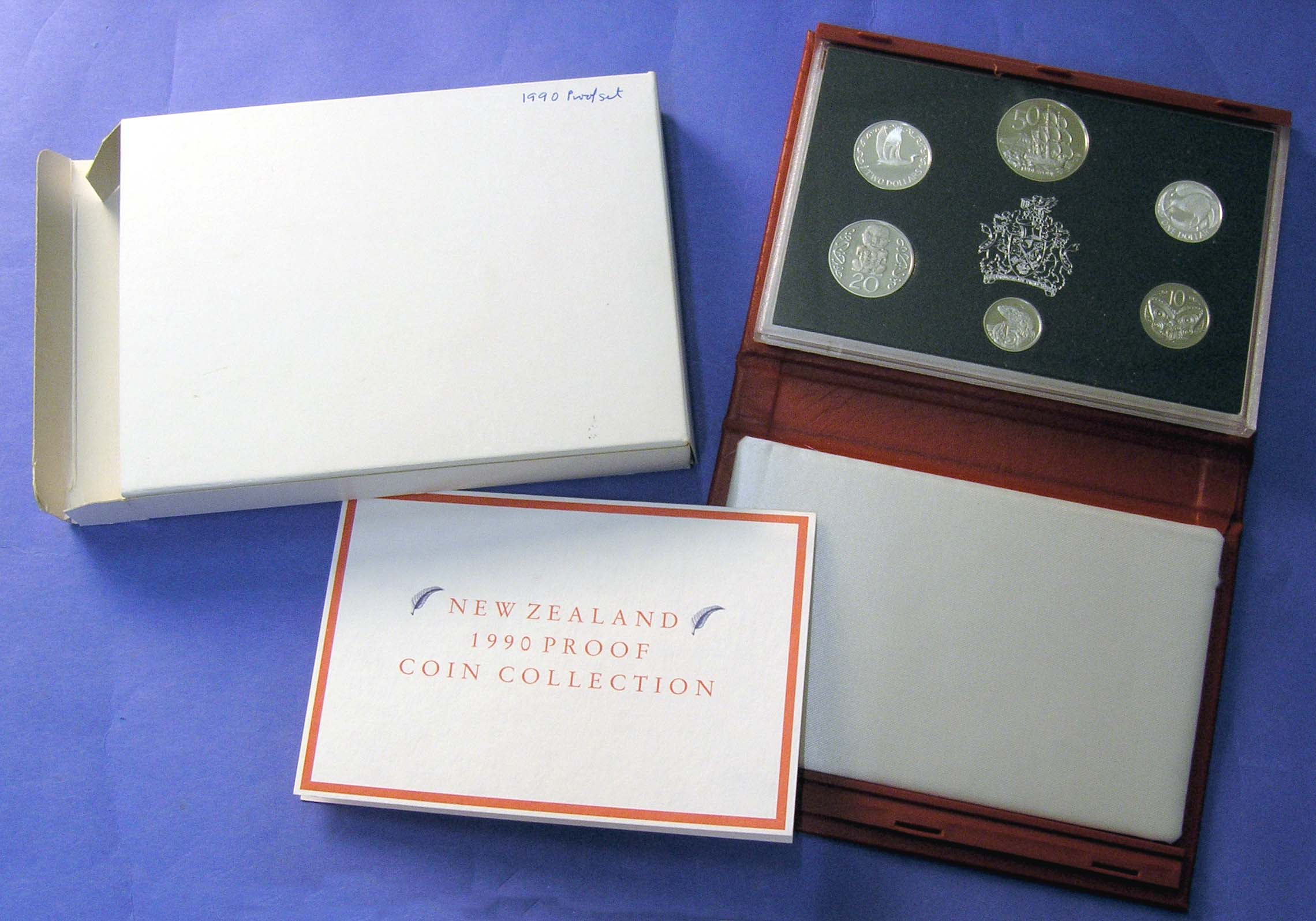
Decorative packaging for coin set: Reserve Bank of New Zealand; Royal Mint

Currency packaging includes several forms of packing cash for easy handling and counting. Many systems use standard color-coding or are marked to indicate the amount in the package.

== Currency straps ==
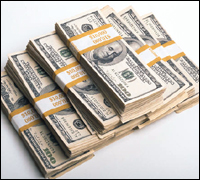
Currency strap holding U.S. bills

Currency straps, also known as currency bands or bill straps, are a type of fastener used to secure specified numbers of bills. Typically, currency bands have attached ends, so that bills are "curled" and slipped into the band, whereas currency straps have adhesive on the ends to secure them around the bills after wrapping. Straps can be applied manually, or automatically by a Currency-counting machine.

== Currency vacuum packaging ==
Generated bundles are packed together in groups of 10 (1000 banknotes) and vacuumized. A cliché print containing bank and branch details is applied to the plastic package seal. Vacuum packing is the most reliable and effective way of storing currency, which is protected against tarnishing, e.g. from moisture and dirt. Vacuum-packed banknotes also take up less space in containers used for transportation. Currency units are vacuum packed using a vacuum sealer.

== Plastic security envelopes ==
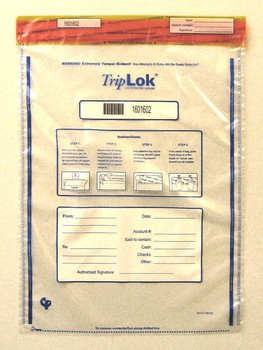
Tamper evident plastic bag

Plastic envelopes and "deposit bags" are used to hold paper currency, stocks, bonds, etc. These are usually tamper evident, and have labels on the front to make notes. Most plastic bags have pressure sensitive adhesive applied and covered with a release liner. The liner is removed and the bag is sealed. Various forms of tamper-evident technology are used to improve security. Many bags have an irreversible imaging feature involving the selective transfer of adhesive when opened.

== Other containers ==
Fabric bags (see Money bag) are heavy duty cloth (woven and non-woven) bags are used to hold coins, rolls of coins, or bundles of banknotes. Bags can be tied shut, sealed with a cable tie or secured with a special security seal using tamper-evident technology.

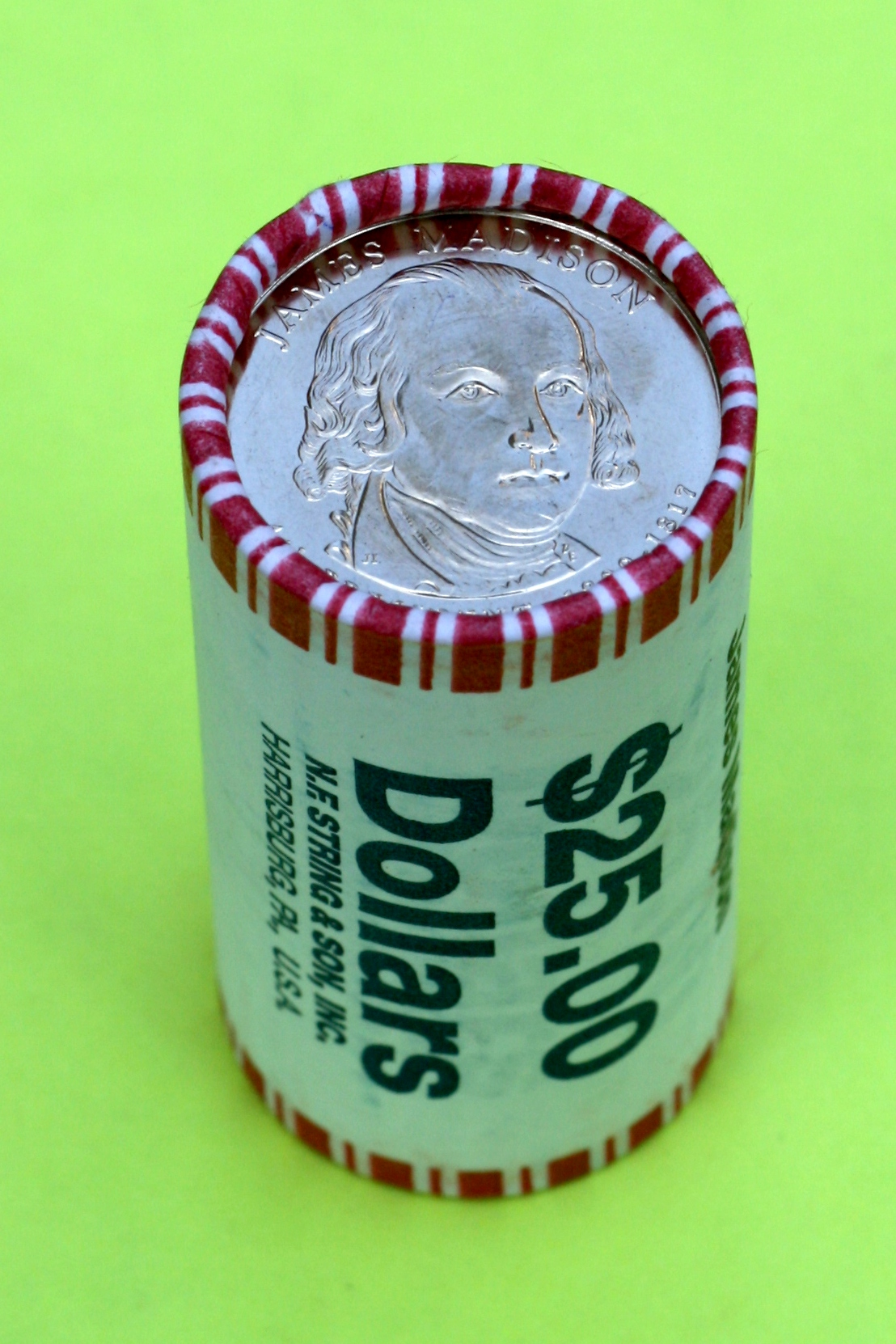
Coin wrapper full of dollars

Coin wrappers are paper or plastic tubes used to hold a specific number of coins.

Currency trays are trays used to handle currency, often sorting it by denomination.

== See also ==
- Dye pack
- Cash-in-transit
- Euro starter kits
