= Uchi-bukuro =

Japanese samurai attire

Uchi-bukuro is a type of Japanese attire employed by the samurai class primarily around the Sengoku period (16th century) of Japan. The Uchi-bukuro translated as a money purse that was usually carried at the waist or around the neck. These ways are known as being rather inconvenient, however. The best known way within feudal Japan to carry money is to paste old Japanese coins onto a folded strip of thick paper and put it between the collars of the under area of the armor.
