= MasterChef Thailand All-Stars =

Season of television series

- No. of episodes: 17

Release
- Original network: Channel 7
- Original release: February 2 – August 2, 2020

Season chronology
- ← Previous; Season 3 Next → Season 4

MasterChef Thailand All-Stars is a cooking game show, spun off from MasterChef Thailand. It was hosted by Piyathida Mittiraroch and the committees are Pasan Svastivatana, Kwantip Devakula and Pongtawat Chalermkittichai This special season welcomes past contestants that did not win the title from previous seasons (seasons 1-3) for the second shot to claim their victory.

The broadcasting began on February 2, 2020 on Channel 7. Due to the COVID-19 pandemic that were ongoing at the moment, the show went in hiatus on April 12, and resumed broadcasting on June 21 with strict social distancing and hygienic policies. All full episodes are currently available in the show's official YouTube channel.

The first All-Stars season is won by Season 3's semi-finalist Jessica "Paope" Wang, while Season 2's Namthip "Jah" Phoosri and Season 3's finalist Chanin "Quest" Cheema finished as co-runner ups.

== Contestants ==
Contestant	Age	Hometown	Occupation	Previous Season	Previous Season Placing	Status	Amount of Winnings
Jessica Wang (Paope)	25	Bangkok	Self-employed	3	4	Winner on August 2	7
Namthip Phoosri (Jah)	28	Bangkok	Auto mechanic	2	4/5	Runners-up on August 2	4
Chanin Cheema (Quest) (Note: The contestant later made an appearance in The Professionals season.)	27	Bangkok	Painter	3	2/3	Runners-up on August 2	5
Bank Jetasanond	40	Bangkok	Steward	2	4/5	Eliminated on July 26	3
Raphatsorn Chirachurichai (Lat) (Note: Formerly Nalat Chiraveerakul.)	32	Lampang	Online trader	2	2	Eliminated on July 26	4
Alisa Dawson (Lisa)	32	Bangkok	English teacher	1	2	Eliminated on July 12	5
Sunya Thadathanawong (Golf)	39	Bangkok	Photographer	2	9	Eliminated on July 12	3
Komsan Wongsa (Deaw)	28	Mae Hong Son	Florist	2	3	Eliminated on July 5	5
Nutnicha Bunlert (Ploy)	29	Pathum Thani	Air hostess	1	3/4	Eliminated on July 5	3
Patcha Kalyanamitr (Toei)	27	Bangkok	Shoe painting business owner	3	2/3	Eliminated on June 28	4
Jitsak Lim-pakornkul (Gino)	43	Phuket	Brand and marketing Director	3	9	Eliminated on April 5	4
Sahadol Tantrapim (Pond)	28	Chiang Mai	Flight attendant	3	5	Eliminated on March 29	2
Chanon Ruangsri	24	Uthai Thani	Trader	3	7	Eliminated on March 22	3
Jumlong Sriraksa	34	Rayong	Fishing pond owner	1	3/4	Eliminated on March 15	2
Rapassa Sirilertsopon (Lukkate)	36	Bangkok	Dessert Cookery Teacher	3	8	Eliminated on March 15	2
Dissakul Prasitruangsuk (Tum)	27	Bangkok	Doctor	2	6	Eliminated on March 8	1
Maniporn Pornchotthaweerat (Belle)	35	Bangkok	Marketing manager	2	12	Eliminated on March 1	2
Isara Donleeken (Kapom)	28	Maha Sarakham	Farmer	2	8	Eliminated on February 23	1
Suchat Jaicham (Ball)	31	Nakhon Nayok	Shrimp farming owner	3	6	Eliminated on February 16	1
Nikul Phayungpong (Nick)	31	Bangkok	Racer	1	9/10	Withdrew on February 9	1

Notes:

Future appearances:

- Several contestants appeared as chef helpers in Celebrity Season 1, including Paope, Jah, Quest, Bank, Lisa, Deaw and Ploy. In Celebrity Season 3, Paope, Jah, Bank and Ploy returned as chef helpers.
- In Team Challenge of Episode 10 of Season 4, Ball hosted his wedding, where he married his wife. Many All-Stars contestants were among guest judges. Some that came including Paope, Quest, Lisa, Gino, Pond, Chanon and Lukkate.
- Paope appeared as a special guest in Episode 6 of Celebrity Season 2.
- Ploy appeared as a special guest in Episode 10 of Season 6.
- Golf appeared as the special host in Team Challenge of Episode 3 of Junior Season 3.
- In 2025, Quest and Ploy returned to compete in The Professionals season. Both of them made into the grand finale, where Ploy finished 4th and Quest finished 5th.
- Paope and Gino appeared in the audience of the grand finale of The Professionals season.
- Pond went to compete in MasterChef Asia (2026) that premiered in late-September, representing Thailand.

== Elimination table ==
Place	Contestant	Episode																								
Place	Contestant	1	2	3		4	5		6	7		8	9		10	11	12		13		14		15/16			16/17
1	Paope	WIN	PT	IN	IMM	WIN	IN	IN	PT	WIN	IMM	WIN	IN	HIGH	PT	IN	IN	IN	IN	IMM	WIN	IMM	WIN	IMM		WINNER
2	Jah	WIN	PT	IN	IN	WIN	HIGH	IMM	PT	IN	IN	PT	IN	IN	WIN	IN	IN	IN	IN	IMM	IN	PT	IN	WIN	IMM	RUNNERS-UP
2	Quest	WIN	PT	HIGH	WIN	WIN	IN	IN	PT	IN	IN	LOW	WIN	IMM	PT	IN	IN	LOW	IMM	IN	HIGH	PT	LOW	IN	WIN	RUNNERS-UP
4	Bank	LOSE	WIN	IN	IMM	PT	IN	IMM	PT	IN	IN	WIN	IN	IN	PT	IN	IN	WIN	LOW	IMM	IN	LOW	IN	IN	ELIM	
4	Lat	LOSE	WIN	IN	IMM	PT	WIN	IMM	WIN	IN	LOW	IN	IN	IN	WIN	IN	HIGH	HIGH	IMM	IN	IN	PT	IN	IN	ELIM	
6	Lisa	LOSE	WIN	IN	HIGH	PT	IN	WIN	WIN	IN	IN	IN	IN	WIN	WIN	IN	HIGH	IN	IMM	IN	HIGH	ELIM				
6	Golf	LOSE	WIN	HIGH	LOW	WIN	IN	IN	LOW	IN	IN	IN	IN	IN	WIN	IN	IN	LOW	IN	IMM	IN	ELIM				
8	Deaw	WIN	PT	IN	IMM	PT	IN	IMM	WIN	IN	WIN	IMM	HIGH	IN	WIN	IN	WIN	IMM	IMM	ELIM						
9	Ploy	WIN	PT	WIN	IMM	LOW	HIGH	IMM	WIN	HIGH	IN	IN	HIGH	IN	PT	IN	IN	IN	ELIM							
10	Toei	LOSE	WIN	IN	LOW	PT	IN	IN	WIN	LOW	LOW	WIN	IN	LOW	WIN	IN	IN	ELIM								
11	Gino	WIN	PT	IN	IN	WIN	IN	IN	WIN	IN	IN	WIN	IN	LOW	ELIM											
12	Pond	LOSE	WIN	IN	IN	PT	IN	IN	WIN	IN	IN	PT	IN	ELIM	JOIN											
13	Chanon	WIN	PT	IN	LOW	WIN	IN	IN	WIN	IN	IN	ELIM			JOIN											
14	Jumlong	WIN	PT	IN	IMM	WIN	IN	IN	PT	IN	ELIM				JOIN											
15	Lukkate	LOSE	WIN	IN	IMM	WIN	IN	HIGH	PT	ELIM					JOIN											
16	Tum	LOSE	WIN	IN	IMM	LOW	IN	IN	ELIM																	
17	Belle	WIN	PT	IN	IMM	WIN	IN	ELIM																		
18	Kapom	LOSE	WIN	IN	IMM	ELIM																				
19	Ball	LOSE	WIN	IN	ELIM																					
20	Nick	WIN	WDR																							

(WINNER) This cook won the competition.
(RUNNER-UP) This cook finished in second place.
(WIN) The cook won an individual challenge (Mystery box challenge or Invention Test).
(WIN) The cook was on the winning in the Between two persons challenge.
(WIN) The cook was on the winning team in the "Team challenge" and directly advanced to the next round.
(HIGH) The cook was one of the top entries in an individual challenge, but didn't win.
(IN) The cook wasn't selected as a top or bottom entry in an individual challenge.
(IN) The cook wasn't selected as a top or bottom entry in a Team challenge but are safe and did not compete in the Pressure Test.
(IMM) The cook didn't have to compete in that round of the competition and was safe from elimination.
(PT) The cook was on the losing team in the Team challenge and competed in the Pressure test.
(PT) The cook didn't have to compete in the Team challenge but competed in the Pressure test.
(LOSE) The cook loses in the Between two persons challenge .
(LOW) The cook was one of the bottom entries in an individual challenge, but wasn't the last person to advance.
(LOW) The cook was one of the bottom entries in an individual challenge, and the last person to advance.
(WDR) The cook withdrew due to illness or personal reason.
(ELIM) The cook was eliminated from MasterChef.
(JOIN) The cook was originally eliminated but invited back in the competition for a "Team challenge".

== Episodes ==
=== Episode 1 : One-on-one battle with the same ingredients ===
Original airdate: Sunday, 2 February 2020

The All-Stars season opens with a warm welcoming of 20 contestants from previous MasterChef seasons, including 4 from season 1, 8 from season 2, and 8 more from season 3. Starting off, the judges have prepared "presents" to welcome back all returning contestants to the competition. Chef Ian takes out 20 black envelopes for contestants to each draw one randomly, containing a greeting card of different colors. Shortly after, 10 black boxes appeared with different color ribbons that corresponds to each of the greeting card. Each color has 2 owners, and they will be pairing up to battle one-on-one with the ingredient inside their boxes as the main challenge.

One-on-One Challenge: After each contestants are paired up, they began opening their boxes to see the main ingredient inside, for which all 10 boxes each have different challenges from previous seasons. In this round, the judges won't be judging the contestants; instead, they brought four special guests to be the judges for the week. They are Chef Pruek Samphanthawat (Iron Chef Thailand), Chef Somsak Rarongkham, Chef Booncheid Sonsuwan, and Chef Kaew Paweenuch (winner of season 1).

- Special guests: Chefs Pruek Samphanthawat, Somsak Rarongkham, Booncheid Sonsuwan, and Kaew Paweenuch

Each contestant will be judged by "blind tasting", where the four special guests will be judging without knowing who did which dish for every pair. They have 60 minutes to create a dish to the best of their ability in hopes of winning their partner's dish. The winner of each pair will be receiving the golden apron, guaranteeing their spot as the main contestant for this season. If they lose, they are eliminated immediately.

- Time: 60 minutes (1 hour)

After cooking time is over, they are sent to the lobby and wait until their pair is called. As each pair enters the kitchen to hear the results, the final selections are as follows:

Pair No.	Main ingredient	Partner 1	Partner 2
1	Lobster	Golf	Chanon
2	Fermented fish	Quest	Pond
3	Instant noodles	Deaw	Lisa
4	Mixed berries	Lat	Paope
5	Frog	Ploy	Tum
6	Rib-eye A5 wagyu beef	Kapom	Jumlong
7	Durian	Belle	Bank
8	Chicken (full, with fur)	Gino	Toei
9	Cow testicles	Ball	Nick
10	Pig head	Jah	Lukkate

= winning contestants

Ten contestants who didn't win later returns with the 10 winners after the round ended, with a heartfelt message from Chef Pom that triggers their emotions. Knowing they must step up their game after losing today, the judges revealed that no one will actually be eliminated this week; they are instead separated into two teams: winners vs. losers. All contestants will be competing in a brutal team challenge next week where one will be eliminated.

=== Episode 2 - Premium A la carte Team Challenge ===
Original airdate: Sunday, 9 February 2020

Team Challenge 1: For their first team challenge of the season, they will be cooking premium, fine-dining dishes by "menu ordering", where the guests will be the ones deciding what dishes they are craving and the contestants must have the ability to cook them. This week's teams were distributed in the last episode, and each team gets to choose their own team captain. The winners (blue team) choose Jah as their team captain, while the other team (red team) choose Lisa.

Team captain	Members
Jah	Jumlong, Ploy, Nick, Deaw, Belle, Quest, Paope, Chanon and Gino
Lisa	Lat, Bank, Tum, Kapom, Golf, Toei, Pond, Ball and Lukkate

The special guests who are the judges for this team challenge are 38 MasterChef Junior contestants, as an honor for recently winning the 24th Asian Television Awards. They will altogether choose six signature dishes they would like to have, including three appetizers and three main courses. Each team will be getting different amount of each signature dish depending on what dishes each Junior contestant wanted. The finalized list of orders are as follows:

Category	Signature Dishes	Team's #	Team's #
Appetizers	Chạo tôm (Fried Shrimp with Sugar Cane)	4 dishes	
Appetizers	Foie Gras Tortellini with Truffle Cream Sauce	8	10
Appetizers	Crab Croquette with Japanese Curry Sauce	7	5
Main Courses	Fettuccine with Lamb Massaman Curry	4 dishes	
Main Courses	Lobster Risotto with Marinara Sauce	5	8
Main Courses	Beef Wellington	10	7

Hence, each team will have a different starting time. For appetizer (and main course prep if they choose to), the contestants will have 30 minutes. However, as the winners from last week, Blue team will receive 10 extra minutes. After that, both teams will have another 1 hour to finish their main course orders. During the round however, Blue team faced consequences in their appetizer dishes that were returned from the Junior contestants (i.e. raw pasta, dirty plates). These mistakes cost them two 5-minute penalties, losing 10 minutes of cooking time in total.

- Time (Appetizer): 30 minutes (40 for blue team)
- Time (Main Course): 60 minutes (1 hour)

As a result, the Junior contestants have voted for Red team to win, whereas Blue team will be facing a Pressure Test round.

- Winning team: Red team

Pressure Test 1: In this round, Blue team contestants will be making a Royal Thai version of Vietnamese stuffed crispy omelet, the same pressure test as given in season 2. What Chef Pom (the recipe owner) and the other judges want are as follows:

1. The batter needs to be crispy and in its original shape when served.

2. The minced shrimp and pork must also show colors and fragrance, and its flavor must be rich and taste like the original.

3. The bean sprouts and shredded coconut must still have its fragrance.

4. The cucumber salad needs to be sweet, salty and sour like the original.

Since this is All-Stars season and all contestants have faced with challenges for at least a year, the judges shrunk their cooking time down 10 minutes -- from initially 45 in season 2 to 35 minutes.

- Time: 35 minutes

Shortly before time runs up, the judges faced controversies with Nick, who is competing in this pressure test. In the end, Nick decides to walk out of the kitchen himself due to his own reasons, withdrawing from the competition.

- Bottom entries: none
- Withdrew from the competition: Nick

=== Episode 3 : Hm... It's the familiar ginger ===
Original airdate: Sunday, 16 February 2020

Mystery Box 1: For their first mystery box of the season, all contestants will be making fresh pasta and cook the best creation out of it. However, the box also includes a pan, which is the only pan they can use throughout the entire round -- no pots or other kitchenware are allowed for heating. By testing their time management, they will have 1 hour as usual to finish their dish despite only having one pan to cook.

- Time: 60 minutes (1 hour)

As a result, Ploy presented the best dish and granted herself immunity for the week.

- Three best dishes: Quest, Ploy and Golf
- Round winner: Ploy

Invention Test 1: Since Ploy wins the previous challenge, she got a chance to sabotage 9 people she would like to get rid of to compete in this round. Ploy stated that the first 4 people are her competitors, which consists of Quest, Toei, Jah and Lisa. Another five, she mentions, are those who aren't her close friends. In this group, Ploy chose Ball, Pond, Gino, Golf and Chanon. The rest that did not get called are saved for the week.

- Saved: Jumlong, Lat, Deaw, Bank, Tum, Kapom, Belle, Paope and Lukkate

As the 9 chosen contestants rushed into the supermarket, they faced the main ingredient of this round: ginger. They must cook a 5-star hotel worthy dish in 1 hour that is given.

- Time: 60 minutes (1 hour)

The judges use 3 criteria in Invention Tests: taste, creativity, and the use of main ingredient. After the judges have tasted all dishes, Quest presented the best dish, Lisa in second. Meanwhile, four bottom entries were not able to enhance the taste of ginger, and Ball was sent home as a result.

- Round winner: Quest
- Bottom four: Toei, Chanon, Golf and Ball
- Eliminated: Ball

=== Episode 4 : Cooking with Tubtim Siam Pomelo ===
Original airdate: Sunday, 23 February 2020

Team Challenge 2

- Location: Talad Thai

For this week's team challenge at Talad Thai, all contestants get to choose whether they would like to join Quest's team or Lisa's team. As a result, 11 people chose Lisa and 5 people chose Quest. Which means, Lisa will have to choose 3 people in her team to join Quest's team to have equal number of members. She chose Belle, Jumlong and Chanon.

Team captain	Members
Quest	Golf, Jah, Lukkate, Paope, Gino, Chanon, Jumlong and Belle
Lisa	Deaw, Lat, Tum, Pond, Toei, Ploy, Bank and Kapom

In this team challenge, both teams will have to cook one savory dish and one dessert for 201 truck drivers across Talad Thai. The main ingredient for both menus is tubtim siam pomelo, and they will have 90 minutes to prepare the dishes. In addition, they are given 1 hour to finish serving all 201 guests.

- Preparation time: 90 minutes
- Service time: 60 minutes (1 hour)

With everyone's past experience in team challenges, both teams were able to serve smoothly and finished in less than half of the time that's given. As a result, Blue team wins and all members are saved for the week.

- Winning team: Blue team

Pressure Test 2: In this round, Red team will be facing a series of skill tests with one single ingredient: eggs. There are 3 different rounds, where the 3 contestants that are the most accurate in each round will be saved immediately for the week. In the last round, one person that scores the least will be eliminated.

Round 1: Poached eggs

All 9 contestants will have to make 3 perfect poached eggs in 10 minutes, where the egg needs to be beautifully shaped, and the yolk is still gooey without any undercooked egg whites. They are each given 3 eggs, so there are no space for mistakes.

- Time: 10 minutes

Overall, Lat, Pond and Lisa were the only ones with 3 perfect poached eggs and therefore saved for the week.

- Winners: Lat, Pond and Lisa

Round 2: Fried eggs

In the second round, the remaining contestants must present 3 perfect Thai-style fried eggs in 7 minutes. The egg whites needs to be crispy and not burnt, while the yolk is still gooey without any cooked spots. They are each given 3 eggs, and again there are no space for mistakes.

- Time: 7 minutes

Overall, Bank, Deaw and Toei were the only ones who presented all 3 perfect fried eggs and saved for the week.

- Winners: Bank, Deaw and Toei

Round 3: Omurice

For their last challenge, the remaining 3 contestants will have to make one perfect omurice dish in 5 minutes. The egg itself needs to be shaped like rugby, and when sliced in half, the egg must cover the rice entirely while not overcooking the inside. The rice is already given for them.

- Time: 5 minutes

One person that scores the least will be eliminated, and it turns out that Kapom is unfortunately sent home this week.

- Eliminated: Kapom

=== Episode 5 : Layer Cake Strikes Back ===
Original airdate: Sunday, 1 March 2020

Mystery Box 2: In this round, all contestants will have to create a unique dish with jellies of any kind as the main component. The mystery box includes pig ear, pig heart, chicken kidney, cow tripe, beef shank (bone-in), salmon, stink bean, Japanese leek, mango, raspberry, jicama, and agar agar powder. They will have 1 hour to make the best jelly dish with the given ingredients.

- Time: 60 minutes (1 hour)

After the judges tasted all dishes, Lat was declared the winner for this round and granted immunity for the week.

- Three best dishes: Ploy, Jah and Lat
- Round winner: Lat

Invention Test 2: 6-Layer Cake

Before the round starts, Lat got a chance to choose two people to immune with her. According to Lat, she chose Jah and Ploy because they are both among the three best dishes that shows everyone their skills to qualify to the next round.

- Saved: Jah and Ploy

In this round, contestants will have to make 6-layer cake (from 4 in season 1) with their own flavor creations. Each layer must have the thickness of around 2 centimeters and equal amounts of cream throughout the cake. It should not collapse when layering, and they must decorate the cake beautifully. Besides from these criteria, the judges will also be giving scores based on taste, creativity, and uniqueness of the cake. The contestants are given 2 hours to complete the cake.

- Time: 2 hours

Before it was time for judges to taste, it was announced that Lat have another chance to save two more people for the week. She chose Deaw and Bank, since their cake were one of the cakes that collapsed while in the making.

- Saved: Deaw and Bank

After the judges tasted all cakes, Lisa scored the highest and Lukkate in second. On the other hand, Belle's cake cost her the elimination.

- Round winner: Lisa
- Eliminated: Belle

=== Episode 6 : Three-Nations Team Challenge ===
Original airdate: Sunday, 8 March 2020

Team Challenge 3: For this team challenge, the remaining contestants arrived at Asiatique in Bangkok, next to Chao Phraya River. They have to cook 3 courses--appetizer, soup and main course--for 71 broadcasters across Thailand. This includes broadcasting managers and news editors from various media, such as Thairath, Khaosod, and members from Channel 7HD. Furthermore, each course must be a different cuisine, which means they will have to cook at least 3 different cuisines. Unfortunately, due to an emergency medical condition, Bank was rushed to the hospital and forced to be excluded from this round. He will have to compete in Pressure Test round alongside the losing team.

- Location: Asiatique, Bangkok, Thailand

Since Lisa and Lukkate presented the best dishes in the last Invention Test, they are the team captains for the week. Lisa won that round, so she gets to pick first. The teams are as follows:

Team captain	Members
Lisa	Lat, Ploy, Toei, Deaw, Chanon, Gino and Pond
Lukkate	Quest, Jah, Paope, Jumlong, Tum and Golf

Both teams have 90 minutes to start preparing all 3 courses. After the 90-minute mark, they will have to serve both appetizer and soup courses immediately. They will then have another 60 minutes to prepare and finish main course.

- Time for appetizer and soup: 90 minutes
- Extra time for main course: 60 minutes (1 hour)

After the guest judges have scored both teams' dishes, Red team won Blue team with the score of 44 to 27.

- Winning team: Red team

Pressure Test 3: In this round, Bank and Blue team have to make stuffed-fried chicken, which requires precision when wrapping and accuracy in temperature. To satisfy the requirements of this dish, the chicken needs to be in-shape and well cooked, where the chicken is beautifully wrapped with no holes and tears of the chicken. The filling itself needs to be completely filled with no air pockets in the chicken, and it has to taste like the original. Contestants will need to serve 5 wings and 5 drumsticks. They have 50 minutes to cook the dish.

- Time: 50 minutes

After the judges have tasted all dishes, Golf and Tum were in the bottom entries due to their undercooked chicken. But after deep evaluation, Tum was unfortunately sent home.

- Bottom two: Golf and Tum
- Eliminated: Tum

=== Episode 7: MasterChef Survival ===
- Original airdate: Sunday 15 March 2020
- This week is "Masterchef Survival" week, meaning that there will be two people eliminated from the competition, one from each round.

Mystery Box 3: Main ingredients: Seafood + Grains

- Time: 60 min. (1 hour)
- Two best dishes: Ploy and Paope
- Winner: Paope
- Bottom two: Toei and Lukkate
- Eliminated: Lukkate

Invention Test 3: Cook a fine-dining dish from "insects"

- Time: 60 min (1 hour)
- Winner: Deaw
- Bottom three: Lat, Toei and Jumlong
- Eliminated: Jumlong

=== Episode 8 The B I G Breakfast ===
- Original airdate: Sunday 22 March 2020

Team Challenge 4: Cooking plates of "Big Breakfast"

- For this week's team challenge, they have separated into three teams by Deaw, which saved for the week.
- Location: Masterchef kitchen

Team Captain	Members
Golf	Lat, Lisa and Ploy
Paope	Gino, Toei and Bank
Jah	Quest, Pond and Chanon

- Time: 45 min.

When the judges check the overall of all dishes, blue team won the rest with 13 dishes total. But since both red and green team got 11 confirmed dishes, the judges need to check the quality of each dishes. As a result, red team won green team for quality.

- Winner: Blue team
- Team that is going to Pressure Test: Green team

Pressure Test 4: Making "Belle Helene"

What the judges want: The steak needs to be medium rare, but without using oven. Also, the potato stick needs to be crispy and all have to have equal sides and lengths. Finally, the sauce needs to taste like the original.

- Guest: Chef Pruek Cassia Samphanthawat
- Time: 30 min.
- Winner: Pond
- Bottom two: Quest and Chanon
- Eliminated: Chanon

=== Episode 9 : Ice cream creativity test with origin food ===
- Original airdate: Sunday 29 March 2020
- Since Chef Ian Pongthawat Chalermkittichai just came back from work in another country, he decided to lock himself for 14 days to slow down the spread of COVID-19. Instead, he invited Chef Pruek Cassia Samphanthawat to be judge for the week.

Mystery Box 4: Making dessert

- Time: 60 min. (1 hour)
- Three best dishes: Quest, Ploy and Deaw
- Winner: Quest

Invention Test 4: Making the assigned menu ice-cream

There are three menus for Quest to choose from, in which she had chosen:

Menu	People
Sweet Egg Bualoy	Deaw, Golf, Gino and Paope
Pickled Crab Somtum	Lat, Lisa and Jah
Grilled Catfish, Neem and Nam Pla Wan	Ploy, Pond, Toei and Bank

- Time: 60 min. (1 hour)

As a result, Lisa did the best, Paope in second.

- Winner: Lisa
- Bottom three: Toei, Gino and Pond
- Eliminated: Pond

=== Episode 10 : Team Delivery Service ===
- Original airdate: Sunday 5 April 2020

Team Challenge 5: Delivery online version, cook for 600 people around Bangkok who support Masterchef Thailand.

- Location: Central World Bangkok
- Since this is a very challenging challenge in Masterchef history, they have four extra people from the previous eliminations to help both teams. Which includes Pond, Chanon, Jumlong and Lukkate.

Team Captain	Members
Lisa	Lat, Jah, Golf, Toei, Deaw and Chanon
Paope	Quest, Ploy, Gino, Bank, Jumlong, Pond and Lukkate

- Time: 2 hours and 30 min. to prepare and deliver, within the first 30 min. for the example.

Score: When the toll ends, there are total of 496 people ordered the dish, in which 203 from the red team and 293 from blue team. But since both teams can't serve all in time, this makes red team served in total of 192 servings, while blue team served 202. That is not the final score though, the judges also have to take off points from the customers who didn't like the food. As a result, red team won blue team with the final score of 130 to 127.

- Winner: Red team

Pressure Test 5: Making grilled lamb rib with herb crust, served with cannelloni ricotta cheese pickle and spicy coconut milk moose.

- Guest: Chef Aof

What they want: The lamb steak needs to be medium rare, and herb crust needs to be stick onto the rib. The cannelloni needs to be al-dente, and both ricotta cheese pickle and spicy coconut milk moose needs to taste like the original, in which the moose needs to be set like whipped cream.

- Time: 60 min. (1 hour)
- Eliminated: Gino

=== Episode 11 : TOP 10 All-Stars ===
- New airdate: Sunday 21 June 2020

This episode is a special clip of judges talking about all 10 contestants' journey through Masterchef challenges. Contestants include Lisa, Ploy, Lat, Deaw, Jah, Bank, Golf, Toei, Quest and Paope.

=== Episode 12 : The Memorial Dish ===
- This episode was originally scheduled to air on April 12, 2020, but was delayed to a later date due to the COVID-19 pandemic.
- New airdate: Sunday 28 June 2020

Note: This episode has been taken at the end of March, which is close to Songkran Festival, or Thai New Year.

Mystery Box 5: Cook a special dish that is a memory to their family

- Time: 60 min. (1 hour)
- Three best dishes: Lat, Lisa and Deaw
- Winner: Deaw

Invention Test 5: Cook a memory dish from the three winners of Masterchef Thailand

In this round, the contestants have to create a higher-level dish from the special guests, which are the three winners of Masterchef Thailand. This includes Kaew from Season 1, First from Season 2, and Max from Season 3. Each person has their own memory dish to have the contestants create today. For Kaew is Spaghetti and Meatballs, First is Khai-Pam, and Max is Choux Cream. Not just only immune to the next round, Deaw had a chance to choose the three menus that he would like. He chose:

Menu	People
Spaghetti and Meatballs	Ploy, Lisa and Golf
Khai-Pam	Lat, Toei and Bank
Choux Cream	Paope, Jah and Quest

- Time: 60 min. (1 hour)

Overall, Bank did the best, Lat in second.

- Winner: Bank
- Bottom three: Golf, Quest and Toei
- Eliminated: Toei

=== Episode 13 : Italian & Indian Cuisine ===
- New airdate: Sunday 5 July 2020
- From this episode, all tapes will be recorded after the curfew. Meaning, there will be social distancing and sanitizing rules while in the competition.

Black Box Challenge: Creating Italian and Indian cuisine dish.

This week, they will be separated into two groups by Bank, which is the winner of the last Invention test. He choose to have Paope, Jah, Golf and Ploy to be his opponent, so this makes Lat, Lisa, Quest and Deaw in another group. After that, Lat, which ranks second last week, get to choose whether she would like Indian or Italian for her group. She chose Indian, meaning Bank's group has Italian.

Cuisine	People
Italian	Bank, Ploy, Jah, Paope and Golf
Indian	Lat, Lisa, Quest and Deaw

Round 1: Italian

Since we're in the spread of COVID-19 situation, each contestant have to make three dishes, one for each judges.

- Time: 60 min. (1 hour)
- Bottom two: Bank and Ploy
- Eliminated: Ploy

Round 2: Indian

Same as the Round 1, each contestant needs to make three dishes, one for each judges because of COVID-19 situation.

- Time: 60 min. (1 hour)

Deaw was eliminated, because his roti was undercooked.

- Eliminated: Deaw

=== Episode 14 : Chef Ann's signature ingredient & dish ===
- New airdate: Sunday 12 July 2020

Mystery Box 6: Cook a combination dish of pickled crab, sweet condensed milk, and raw bananas.

For the winner of this round will automatically qualified to Semi-final of Masterchef All-Stars Thailand. And since we're in the spread of COVID-19 pandemic, each contestant have to make three dishes, one for each judges.

- Time: 60 min. (1 hour)
- Three best dishes: Lisa, Paope and Quest
- Winner: Paope

Pressure Test 6: Cook bean sprouts, tofu, minced chicken, and white balsamic sauce stuffed in Xiao Long Bao.

In this round, all six contestants have to make a signature dish from a chef who works with Chef Ian for over 10 years. She is Chef Ann Pavita, which is also one of the contestant in The Next Iron Chef Thailand. Today Chef Ann brought her own signature dish from bean sprouts, and it is Xiao Long Bao stuffed with bean sprouts, tofu, minced chicken, and white balsamic sauce. In this challenge, two people will be sent home.

Original:

1. The pastry needs to be thin, and not thick. The Xiao Long Bao have to be folded neatly, and completely covered without any holes or leaks.

2. The filling must clearly raise the bean sprouts, and have the right amount of tofu, chopped chicken and bean sprouts like original.

3. White balsamic sauce needs to have taste like original.

4. When slicing the Xiao Long Bao, the soup of white balsamic sauce needs to be juicy, not dry.

- Time: 60 min. (1 hour) for 8 pieces.
- Bottom three: Bank, Lisa and Golf
- Eliminated: Lisa and Golf

=== Episode 15: Semi-Final with 3 Very Challenging Missions ===
- New airdate: Sunday 19–26 July 2020

Mystery Box 7: Cook a fine-dining dish from ingredients during curfew.

The winner of this mystery box will be the first to qualify to the finale of Masterchef All-Stars Thailand. The rest will have to face the second round.

- Time: 60 min (1 hour)
- Winner: Paope
- Worst Performer : Quest (Food is trashed by Chef Pongtawat Chalermkittichai)

Invention Test 6: Main ingredient: Uni

For the winner of this round will be the second to qualify to the finale. The rest will be facing the last round that they cannot predict what will happen.

- Time: 60 min (1 hour)
- Winner: Jah

Pressure Test 7: Roasted shrimp paste with deep-fried snakehead fish

In this round, the contestants will have to use their knowledge to identify the ingredients inside the roasted shrimp paste, and yet the judge have put in a mystery ingredient inside the paste. A contestant who did closest to the original will be the third and last to qualify to the finale. Unfortunately, the other two will be sent home.

- Time: 60 min (1 hour)

The result was announced on Episode 16 (July 26) within the finale.

- Winner: Quest
- Eliminated: Lat and Bank

=== Episode 16-17: The All-Stars Finale ===
- Airdate: Sunday 26 July - 2 August 2020

It has come to the finale round, in which the finalist are Paope, Jah, and Quest. All three of them have to create their three different course which are appetizer, main course, and dessert. The contestant needs to make three dishes, one for each judge. They have 60 minutes (1 hour) on each course, and 10 minutes in the supermarket (this includes all three courses). A contestant with the overall best presentation will be crowned as the next Masterchef, with 1,000,000 baht, and her own cookbook.

- Time: 60 min (1 hour) in each course.
- Masterchef All-Stars Thailand Winner: Paope Jessica Wang
