= MasterChef Thailand Celebrity season 1 =

MasterChef Thailand Celebrity
- Season 1
- No. of episodes: 8

Release
- Original network: Channel 7
- Original release: November 1 – December 20, 2020

Season chronology
- Next → Season 2

MasterChef Celebrity Thailand is the Thai version of the competitive reality TV series MasterChef which premiered on Channel 7 on November 1, 2020.

== Celebrities ==
Contestant	Age	Hometown	Group	Status	Number of Wins
Pitt Karchai	33	Bangkok	A	Winner on December 20	2
Patiparn Patavekarn (Mos)	47	Bangkok	A	Runner-Ups on December 20	0
Nuengtida Sophon (Noona)	28	Nontaburi	B	Runner-Ups on December 20	1
Paweenut Pangnakorn (Pookie)	39	Ratchaburi	B	Runner-Ups on December 20	1
Chinawut Indracusin (Chin)	31	Bangkok	B	Eliminated on December 6	1
Samapol Piyapongsiri (Kai)	51	Bangkok	B	Eliminated on November 29	0
Pimara Charuenpakdee (Waan)	36	Bangkok	B	Eliminated on November 22	0
Phantila Fooklin (Aire)	33	Bangkok	A	Eliminated on November 15	1
Pakkaramai Potranan (Tong)	42	Chonburi	A	Eliminated on November 8	1
Thanatchaphan Buranacheevilai (Bookko)	35	Bangkok	A	Eliminated on November 1	1

== Elimination table ==
Place	Contestant	Episode												
Place	Contestant	1		2		3		4		5		6		7/8
1	Pitt	IN	IN	WIN	IN	IN	PT	PASS						WINNER
2	Mos	IN	IN	IN	IN	IN	PT	PASS						RUNNERS-UP
2	Noona							HIGH	IN	WIN	IN	IN	PT	RUNNERS-UP
2	Pookie							HIGH	LOW	HIGH	IN	WIN	PT	RUNNERS-UP
5	Chin							WIN	IN	IN	IN	IN	ELIM	
5	Aire	IN	LOW	IN	IN	WIN	ELIM							
7	Kai							IN	IN	IN	ELIM			
7	Tong	IN	WIN	IN	ELIM									
9	Waan							IN	ELIM					
9	Bookko	WIN	ELIM											

(WINNER) This cook won the competition.
(RUNNER-UP) This cook finished in second place.
(WIN) The cook won an individual challenge (Mystery Box Challenge or Elimination Test).
(HIGH) The cook was one of the top entries in an individual challenge, but didn't win.
(IN) The cook wasn't selected as a top or bottom entry in an individual challenge.
(PASS) The cook won in group A and is waiting for the final round.
(PT) The cook was on the last round before qualifying to the finals and competed in the Pressure Test.
(LOW) The cook was one of the bottom entries in an individual challenge or Pressure Test, but advanced.
(ELIM) The cook was eliminated from MasterChef.

=== Helper Chef ===
Helper	Episode						
Helper	1	2	3	4	5	6	
First	Aire						
Paope	Tong						
Jah	Mos	Pitt					
Ploy	Pitt	Mos	Mos				
Daew	Bookko		Aire				
Kaew				Pookie			
Lisa				Noona	Kai	Pookie	
Max				Chin			Pookie
Quest				Kai	Pookie	Noona	
Bank				Waan	Noona		

- Rules for helpers: When all helpers hear the alarm, they have to rush straight to their partner's station to help out. However, when the alarm sounds again (which is basically after five minutes), helpers need to go back to where they used to be.
- Chef helpers will not be available in the finale.

== Episodes ==
=== Episode 1- Team A ===
- Original Airdate: Sunday 1 November 2020

This week is the first week for team A to compete in Masterchef kitchen, which are Mos Patiparn, Tong Pakkaramai, Pitt Karchai, Aire Phantila, and Bookko Thanachaphan. Since they are not professional chefs, the judges have bring five helpers from the previous seasons. They are First from Season 2, Paope from Season 3, Jah from Season 2, Ploy from Season 1, and Deaw from Season 2. All five celebrities and helpers got paired up by the fortune wheel, including:

Pairs	Celebrities	Helpers
1	Mos	Jah
2	Tong	Paope
3	Pitt	Ploy
4	Aire	First
5	Bookko	Deaw

Mystery Box 1: Pig head

In this round, all five celebrities needs to create a dish from the main ingredient, pig head, and they all have to fillet the pig head by themselves.

- Time: 60 min (1 hour)
- Winner: Bookko

Invention Test 1: 3 types of crabs

Since Bookko is the winner of the Mystery Box round, he deserves a chance to choose a type of crab for himself, and for others. He chose:

Ingredients	Contestant(s)
Taraba Crab	Bookko and Aire
Blue Crab	Tong
Pickled Crabs	Mos and Pitt

- Time: 60 min (1 hour)
- Winner: Tong
- Bottom two: Aire and Bookko
- Eliminated: Bookko

=== Episode 2 ===
- Original Airdate: Sunday 8 November 2020

This week's pairs will not be the same as last week. In fact, the fortune wheel will once again spins to see what the new pairs are. The results are:

Pairs	Celebrities	Helpers
1	Mos	Ploy
2	Tong	Paope
3	Pitt	Jah
4	Aire	First

Mystery Box 2: Luxury Japanese ingredients

- Time: 60 min (1 hour)
- Winner: Pitt

Invention Test 2: Main Ingredient: Eggs

Pitt, the winner from the last round gets to disqualify two helpers from his opponents. He decided to have Mos's and Tong's helpers to be disqualified, which are Ploy and Paope. All contestants deserves 10 minutes in the Masterchef supermarket, but all supermarket are full with eggs...

- Time: 60 min. (1 hour)

As a result, Tong is eliminated due to the pork that is still raw.

- Eliminated: Tong

=== Episode 3 ===
- Original Airdate: Sunday 15 November 2020

Same as Episode 2, the pairs will be new once again.

Pairs	Contestants	Helpers
1	Mos	Ploy
2	Pitt	Jah
3	Aire	Deaw

Mystery Box 3: Desserts

- Time: 60 min (1 hour)
- Winner: Aire

Pressure Test 1: Traditional style crispy noodles

- Original:

- The sauce must be stir-fried until dry and rich in flavor, in which it has a slight smell and taste of the bitter orange.

- The noodles must be crispy but not puffed. When mixed with seasoned water, the noodles must not clump together.

- The composition of the original recipe crispy noodles must be complete and meticulously prepared to be the same as the original.

Since Aire got declared as the winner in Mystery Box round, she deserves all the ingredients for today's Pressure Test, while Mos and Pitt have to search for the ingredients by their own in the equipment room. Two celebrities with the best result will be qualify to the finals to compete with the two winners from team B.

- Time: 60 min (1 hour)
- Eliminated: Aire
- Qualify to finals: Mos and Pitt

=== Episode 4- Team B ===
- Original Airdate: Sunday 22 November 2020

This week is the first week for team B celebrities to compete. They are Chin Chinawut, Noona Nuengthida, Kai Samapol, Waan Primara, and Pookie Paweenuch. Same thing with team A, the five celebrities will have their five helpers from various MasterChef seasons. Helpers for team B are Kaew from Season 1, Max from Season 3, Lisa from Season 1, Quest from Season 3, and Bank from Season 2.

Pairs	Contestants	Helpers
1	Pookie	Kaew
2	Noona	Lisa
3	Chin	Max
4	Waan	Bank
5	Kai	Quest

Mystery Box 4: Bong Tun (Crocodile's Tail)

In this round, all five celebrities have to create a dish with the main ingredient, bong tun, or crocodile's tail. In addition, they all will have to fillet the crocodile's tail by their own.

- Time: 60 min. (1 hour)
- Three best dishes: Pookie, Chin and Noona
- Winner: Chin

Invention Test 3: Beef tongue

As a winner, Chin gets to choose a time limit to his opponents. While Chin have an hour, others will receives either 50 minutes or 40 minutes to cook. He chose to have Noona and Waan to have 50 minutes, and 40 minutes for Kai and Pookie.

- Time: 60 minutes for Chin, 50 minutes for Noona and Waan, and 40 minutes for Kai and Pookie.
- Bottom two: Pookie and Waan
- Eliminated: Waan

=== Episode 5 ===
- Original Airdate: Sunday 29 November 2020

Mystery Box 5: Breakfast dish

Today's mystery box is in breakfast theme. In fact, the four contestant will not have chef helpers, and will need to create the dish by their own.

- Time: 60 min (1 hour)
- Two best dishes: Noona and Pookie
- Winner: Noona

Invention Test 4: Signature dish from the four helpers

For this round, four contestants will be making a dish from the four helpers, which are Lisa, Quest, Max, and Bank. Noona wins the Mystery Box challenge, so she gets to assign a dish for herself, and the rest to others.

Pairs	Contestants	Helpers
1	Kai	Lisa
2	Pookie	Quest
3	Noona	Bank
4	Chin	Max

- Time: 70 minutes, within the first 10 minutes with helpers
- Eliminated: Kai

=== Episode 6 ===
- Original Airdate: Sunday 6 December 2020

Same as Team A, all pairs will be new this week.

Pairs	Contestants	Helpers
1	Chin	Max
2	Pookie	Lisa
3	Noona	Quest

Mystery Box 6: Thai native ingredients

- Time: 60 min (1 hour)
- Winner: Pookie

Pressure Test 2: Thai tea filling Croquembouche

For Team B's pressure test, the three celebrities will need to make 1-foot tall croquembouche by themselves without chef helpers. However, since Pookie won the Mystery Box Challenge, she deserves a chance to video call with a chef helper that she wants at anytime while cooking. Pookie will have only five minutes to call with the helper. As a result, Pookie chose to video call with Max.

- Original:

- The tower needs to be fully covered with 50 choux cream

- The texture of choux cream must be like original

- The taste have to be stable, not too sweet and too plain.

- Time: 90 minutes

Chin is eliminated, since he can only make the tower with 36 pieces of choux, while Noona's 38 and Pookie's 41.

- Eliminated: Chin
- Qualify to Finals: Noona and Pookie.

=== Episode 7-8: Finale ===
- Original airdate: Sunday 13–20 December 2020

It has now came to the final round of MasterChef Celebrity Thailand, which includes Mos, Noona, Pitt, and Pookie. All four contestants have to create three courses, which are appetizer, main course, and dessert. In each course, the contestant needs to make three dishes, one for each judge. They have 60 minutes (1 hour) for each course, and 10 minutes in the supermarket (this includes all three courses). A contestant with the overall best presentation will be crowned as the first MasterChef celebrity, with 1,000,000 baht for their selected foundation.

- Time: 60 min (1 hour) in each course.
- MasterChef Celebrity Thailand winner: Pitt Karchai
