= Thai money bag =

Traditional Thai appetizer

Thai money bag (Thai: ถุงทอง (thung thong) – 'golden bags', pronounced [tʰǔŋ tʰɔ̄ːŋ]) is a traditional Thai savory appetizer. They are part of the Thai royal cuisine.

People usually give thung thong during the New Year festival to wish each other money or gold. In the past, they used to be served on occasions such as weddings, but nowadays thung thong is more likely to be served at luxurious parties or Chinese banquets.

== Ingredients ==
The ingredients include:

- Wrapper
- Medium-sized shrimps, cleaned, shelled and deveined
- Minced Pork
- Chestnuts, cut into small cubes
- Shitake mushroom, cut into small cubes
- Sugar
- Coriander root, finely chopped
- Minced garlic
- Fish sauce
- Soy sauce
- Garlic chives, scald in hot water and slice into a thin line for binding wonton wrappers
- Sweet plum sauce or sweet chilli sauce (for dipping)
