= Thaifoodmaster =

- Website type: Culinary education and manuscript preservation
- Available in: English, Thai
- Owner: Hanuman Aspler
- Website: thaifoodmaster.com
- Registration: Free (limited); subscription (full access)
- Launched: 2009
- Current status: Active

Thaifoodmaster is a Thailand-based culinary education platform and manuscript preservation project founded by French-Israeli food scholar Hanuman Aspler. The project translates and publishes historical Thai culinary manuscripts from the Rattanakosin period (1782–1932), making primary sources available in bilingual Thai–English editions with archaic measurements converted to metric.

The site operates as a subscription-based platform offering online masterclasses, recipe archives, and professional culinary guides, alongside an in-person cooking school at Three Trees Doi Saket in Chiang Mai Province.

== History ==
Aspler launched Thaifoodmaster in 2009 as a recipe and food history journal. The site initially published free step-by-step recipes and articles on Thai culinary history and regional cooking traditions.

Around 2022, the platform relaunched as a membership-based service, expanding its content to include professional-level masterclasses and structured culinary guides on subjects including Thai curries, Siamese salads, chili relishes, and historical menu design.

In August 2016, Thai independent magazine A Day (issue 192) profiled the project in a feature examining questions of culinary authenticity and the effort to collect and preserve historical Thai recipes.

== Siamese Recipe Archive ==
The Siamese Recipe Archive (Thai: คลังตำราอาหารสยาม) is the site's manuscript digitization and translation project, focused on primary culinary sources from the Rattanakosin era. The archive publishes recipes in their original Thai script alongside English translations, preserving the authors' voice, terminology, and instructional style while converting archaic Thai measurement systems to grams.

=== Key manuscripts ===
The archive draws on six principal historical sources:

- Lady Plean Passakornrawong, Maae Khruaa Huaa Bpaa (Thai: แม่ครัวหัวป่าก์, 1908) — considered the foundational text of classical Siamese cookery, documenting palace banquets, temple offerings, and household recipes from the late 19th century. The MKHP_as_is sub-project publishes these recipes three times weekly, presenting them as written with a parallel third-person narrative for modern readers.
- Ibrahim Haji Roshidin Tuan (Thai: อิบรอฮิม หะยี รอซีดีน ตวน), The Islamic Cook (ตำราพ่อครัวอิสลาม, 1929) and The Muslim Cook (แม่ครัวมุสลิม, 1938) — described as Thailand's first documented Thai-Muslim cookbook. Ibrahim was a professional caterer in Thonburi working weddings, funerals, and hired events; his recipes specify quantities for feeding crowds and preserve techniques from working Thai-Muslim kitchens, including dum cooking with flour-sealed pot lids.
- Mrs. Jeeb Bunnag (Thai: คุณย่าจีบ บุนนาค; pen name: "the granddaughter of Maae Khruaa Huaa Bpaa"), manuscripts spanning 1933 to the 1960s. Trained by Lady Plean Passakornrawong in the palace kitchens, she lost her inherited manuscripts in a 1929 fire that destroyed her home in Bang Krabue. Four years later, she began publishing from memory, signing her books with her home address so readers could write to her.
- Mom Ying Supha (Thai: หม่อมหญิงสุภา), The Pornthip Collection (รวมตำราพรทิพย์, 1949–1950) — four volumes covering Thai salads, savory dishes, sweets, and a combined Thai-Chinese-Western collection, published in Bangkok. The author claimed royal descent (using the title M.L.) and stated her recipes were "royal kitchen-tested." No biographical record beyond the texts has been located.
- Gingganok Gaanjanaaphaa (Thai: กิ่งกนก กาญจนาภา), None Repeated (1935) — a compilation of over two hundred recipes from the special cooks of the royal kitchen (แม่ครัวพิเศษแห่งห้องเครื่องเสวย), written from Hua Hin and completed in July 1935. Three women contributed recipes: Khun Praphai, Khun Jira, and Khun Noi. No biographical record of the compiler beyond this text has been located.
- Thanom Palaboot (Thai: ถนอม ปาลบุตร), A Teacher's Compilation (คู่มือการครัว, 1941) — a four-volume kitchen manual comprising approximately 800 recipes, compiled by a teacher at the Girls' School in Maha Sarakham Province in Isan. Her sources included teachers, textbooks, and practitioners with culinary expertise.

=== AI-assisted translation ===
Since 2024, the archive has used a specially trained AI model called Jasmine, developed as part of the project's ThaiFoodAI Flair and Spirit system, to assist with OCR processing and initial translation of manuscripts. Each document undergoes review before publication.

== Three Trees Doi Saket ==
The project operates an in-person cooking school at Three Trees Doi Saket, a 15 rai (2.4 hectares) farm in Doi Saket district, Chiang Mai Province. The school offers intensive residential workshops, typically lasting five to seven days, focused on historical techniques and manuscript-based cooking.

Professional chefs who have attended workshops at Three Trees include Dylan Eitharong (Haawm, Bangkok), Bee Satongun (Paste Bangkok, one Michelin star), Benjamin Chapman (Kiln and Smoking Goat, London), and Chudaree "Tam" Debhakam (Baan Tepa, two Michelin stars).

== Reception ==
In 2020, National Geographic Travel cited Thaifoodmaster as an expert source on the origins of Thai green curry, quoting Aspler's research into when the dish first appeared in Thai manuscripts. That same year, Thai PBS broadcast a full episode of its documentary series Spirit of Asia featuring the project. London restaurant Som Saa has listed Thaifoodmaster on its curated Thai food resources page, describing it as "hands-down the best Thai food website we know of."

The project has been covered in Hebrew-language media by Haaretz food critic Ronit Vered in 2014, 2016, and 2018, and by Ynet food correspondent Michal Waxman in 2016 and 2017. In Thailand, the project has been featured on NBT2's Thai Tee Rak and Channel 9 MCOT's Chan Rak Mueng Thai and Princess Diary programmes, and was profiled by Thai newspaper Manager in December 2016.

== See also ==
- Thai cuisine
- Rattanakosin Kingdom
- Lady Plean Passakornrawong
- Digital preservation
