= Top Chef Thailand 2023 =

- Season 4
- Judges: Willment Leong; Suphamongkhon Supapipat; Thitid Tassanakajohn; Phichaya Uthantam
- No. of contestants: 16
- Location: Samut Prakan; Trat (EP.1); QSNCC (EP.3 & EP.10)
- No. of episodes: 15

Release
- Original network: Channel 7
- Original release: February 5 – May 28, 2023

Season chronology
- ← Previous; Season 3

Top Chef Thailand 2023 (Also known as Top Chef Thailand season 4) is the fourth season of the Thai reality television series Top Chef Thailand. The season premiered on February 5, 2023. Willment Leong, Suphamongkhon Supapipat, Thitid Tassanakajohn and Phichaya Uthantam served as judges.

== Contestant progress ==
Place	Episodes															
Place	Episodes	1	2	3	4	5	6	7	8	9	10	11	12	13	14	15
Place	Quickfire Challenge; Results	Round 1 Chet ★ Golf ↓ Enoch ↓ Jack ↓ Round 2 Ploy ★ Mean ↓ Kuk ↓ Ged ↓	Jareuk ★ Note ↑ Chet ↑ Tien ↓ Oat ↓ Nut ↓	Golf ★ Chet ↑ Ploy ↑ Enoch ↓ Mean ↓ Kuk ↓	Maggie ★ Golf ↑ Big ↑ Note ↑ Mean ↑ Jareuk ↑	Note ★ Jareuk ↑ Kuk ↑ Ploy ↑	Enoch ★ Nut ↑ Golf ↑ Ploy ↑	Golf ★ Note ↑ Tien ↑ Jareuk ↓ Enoch ↓ Big ↓	—N/a	—N/a	—N/a	Tien ★ Note ↑ Big ↑	Tien ★ Jareuk ↑ Ged ↓ Big ↓	Enoch ★ Big ↓ Ged ↓	—N/a	—N/a
1	Big	IN	LOW	HIGH	IN	IN	IN	HIGH	HIGH	IMM	IN	IN	LOW	WIN	HIGH	WINNER
2	Enoch	LOW	LOW	IN	IN	LOW	IMM	HIGH	WIN	IMM	IN	IN	IN	HIGH	LOW	RUNNER-UP
2	Ged	IN	OUT							RET	WIN	HIGH	HIGH	LOW	WIN	RUNNER-UP
4	Ploy	IN	IN	HIGH	HIGH	HIGH	LOW	WIN	IN	IMM	IN	WIN	HIGH	LOW	OUT	
5	Jareuk	IN	IMM	LOW	LOW	HIGH	LOW	HIGH	LOW	IMM	IN	IN	WIN	OUT	JOIN	JOIN
6	Tien	IN	IN	IN	LOW	IN	WIN	IN	IN	IMM	IN	HIGH	OUT		JOIN	JOIN
7	Note	IN	LOW	LOW	LOW	IMM	HIGH	LOW	IN	IMM	LOW	OUT			JOIN	
7	Chet	IN	LOW	IMM	LOW	IN	HIGH	IN	LOW	IMM	HIGH	OUT				
9	Oat	IN	LOW	LOW	WIN	WIN	IN	LOW	WIN	IMM	OUT				JOIN	JOIN
10	Golf	IN	HIGH	IMM	HIGH	IN	IN	HIGH	OUT	OUT	JOIN				JOIN	
11	Nut	IN	IN	WIN	WIN	LOW	IN	OUT		OUT					JOIN	JOIN
12	Maggie	IN	HIGH	IN	IMM	IN	OUT			OUT					JOIN	JOIN
13	Kuk	IN	HIGH	IN	LOW	OUT				OUT						
14	Mean	LOW	WIN	LOW	OUT					OUT						
15	Dej	IN	IN	OUT						OUT						
16	Jack	OUT								OUT					JOIN	JOIN

Quickfire Challenge
★ The chef won the Quickfire Challenge.
↑ The chef was selected as one of the top entries in the Quickfire Challenge but did not win.
↓ The chef was selected as one of the bottom entries in the Quickfire Challenge.

Elimination Challenge
(WINNER) The contestant won Top Chef Thailand.
(RUNNER-UP) The contestant was a Runner-Up.
(WIN) Team / The contestant was winning elimination challenge.
(HIGH) Team / The contestants nominated in elimination challenge but not win.
(WIN) The contestant was winning restaurant wars and cooked the best.
(HIGH) The contestant was winning restaurant wars and nominated in cooked the best.
(IN) The contestant was winning restaurant wars.
(IN) The chef was not selected as one of the top or bottom entries in the elimination challenge and was safe.
(IN) The contestant who advance to the next round without having to compete in elimination challenge.
(IMM) The contestant who have been granted immunity. Not eliminated that week.
(RET) This contestant was eliminated but returned to compete again after winning vote back round.
(LOW) Team was at risk of elimination.
(LOW) The contestant was at risk of elimination.
(OUT) The contestant was eliminated from the competition in quickfire challenge.
(OUT) The contestant was eliminated but return to compete in vote back round but lost.
(JOIN) The contestants who have been eliminated but are invited to join restaurant wars round.
(JOIN) The contestants who have been eliminated but are invited to join the competition.

== Award ==
- Best TV Format Adaptation (Unscripted) in Asia from Content Asia Award 2023
