= Hanuman Aspler =

- הנומן אספלר
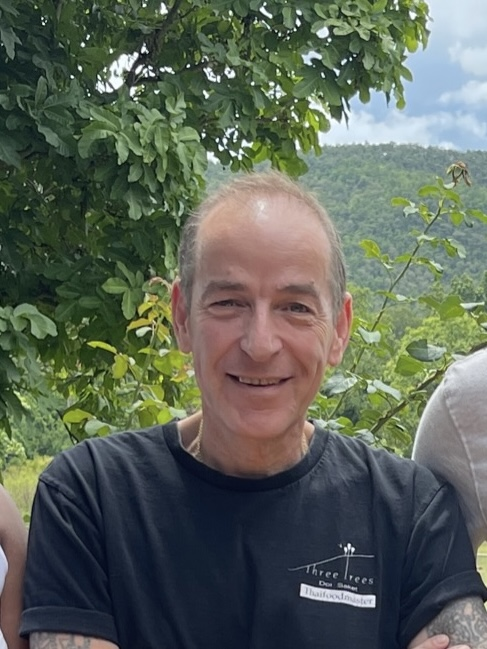
- Born: Eyal Aspler; 1962 (age 63–64); Jerusalem, Israel
- Occupations: Physician; Food scholar; Cookbook author
- Known for: Thai culinary history, Thaifoodmaster, Siamese Recipe Archive
- Website: thaifoodmaster.com

Eyal (Hanuman) Aspler (Hebrew: הנומן אספלר; born 1962) is a French-Israeli physician and food scholar known for his work on historical Thai cuisine. Based in Thailand since 1989, he specializes in pre-World War II Siamese culinary manuscripts and operates a cooking school at his farm in Doi Saket, Chiang Mai Province.

== Early life and education ==
Aspler was born in Jerusalem in 1962 to a Holocaust survivor from Romania and a Tunisian mother. He trained in medicine at Ben-Gurion University of the Negev and practiced as a physician in Israel before moving to Bangkok in 1988.

== Career ==
=== Ganoksin Project ===
In 1996, Aspler and Canadian goldsmith Charles Lewton-Brain co-founded the Ganoksin Project, an educational website for jewelers and metalsmiths that became one of the largest resources in the field.

=== Thai culinary work ===
Aspler moved to Thailand in 1989, settling first in Bangkok and later in Nonthaburi. He lived in Bangkok from 1989 to 2018 before relocating to Chiang Mai Province, where he established Three Trees Doi Saket, a cooking school on a 15 rai (2.4 hectares) farm in Doi Saket district. His work focuses on digitizing and translating historical Thai culinary manuscripts from the Rattanakosin period, and he has described his approach as treating Thai cuisine as a language with its own grammar and syntax.

In 2020, National Geographic Travel cited Aspler as an expert on the historical origins of Thai green curry, noting his research into Rattanakosin-era manuscripts. That same year, Thai PBS broadcast a full episode of Spirit of Asia dedicated to his work at Three Trees.

Aspler founded Thaifoodmaster.com, a subscription-based platform that publishes bilingual Thai–English translations of historical recipes and offers online culinary courses. The site includes the Siamese Recipe Archive, a project focused on the preservation and public accessibility of pre-war Thai culinary manuscripts.

A major output of the Siamese Recipe Archive is MKHP_as_is, a project launched in 2024 to produce a full bilingual Thai–English translation of all five volumes of Mae Khrua Hua Pa (แม่ครัวหัวป่าก์), the 1908 cookbook by Lady Plean Passakornrawong (ท่านผู้หญิงเปลี่ยน ภาสกรวงศ์), widely regarded as the first comprehensive written record of Siamese cuisine. The project converts archaic Siamese weights and measurements to metric equivalents while retaining the original references, and presents Lady Plean's text in its unaltered form alongside modernised culinary annotations.

Thai novelist and food writer Anusorn Tipayanon, whose novel Plian Pa draws on Lady Plean Passakornrawong's Mae Khrua Hua Pa, described Aspler in a 2024 interview with the Thai magazine The Cloud as one of the foremost interpreters of historical Thai cookbooks, crediting him with an analytical approach that treats recipes as constructions and asks why they work rather than only how to reproduce them.

Aspler's collection includes several hundred Thai cremation volumes—memorial books in which family, colleagues, and institutions traditionally recorded recipes alongside biographical tributes—spanning aristocratic and royal culinary traditions from the 1890s onward. The collection includes two cookbooks by Jeeb Bunnag (see below), compiled in 1933 and 1954 respectively.

Teaching sessions at Three Trees Doi Saket are conducted in small groups in a kitchen equipped with gas-powered stoves, brass woks, and granite mortars. Sessions proceed from close reading of historical manuscripts to direct practical cooking, with ingredients sourced from the farm. A 2026 profile in Sawasdee described Aspler's method as combining manuscript analysis with hands-on kitchen work, characterising his approach as scientific and analytical while grounded in direct physical practice.

=== Jeeb Bunnag ===
A significant focus of Aspler's manuscript research is the culinary legacy of Jeeb Bunnag, a Thai cooking teacher of the early twentieth century. According to a 2026 profile in Sawasdee, Bunnag was a granddaughter-in-law of Lady Plean Passakornrawong (ท่านผู้หญิงเปลี่ยน ภาสกรวงศ์), the author of the foundational Siamese cookbook Mae Khrua Hua Pa (1908), placing her within the same household culinary lineage that Aspler has studied through his Siamese Recipe Archive and the MKHP_as_is project.

Jeeb Bunnag taught cooking at several institutions, including Suan Dusit College, and continued to give private lessons until shortly before her death. She died in 1964 at the age of 75. Her recipes are documented in two cookbooks written during her lifetime and in a memorial book published after her death. The profile in Sawasdee reported that Aspler holds both cookbooks and has described her work as a significant contribution to the palace-tradition cooking of the Rattanakosin period that went largely unrecognised within Bangkok's elite social circles—in part because, by the time of her death, that milieu had shifted toward Western cultural practices and away from traditional Siamese cooking.

=== Notable students and collaborators ===
Thai-American chef Dylan Eitharong, owner of the Bangkok supper club Haawm, studied under Aspler in Chiang Mai. In an interview with Roads & Kingdoms, chef Andy Ricker named Aspler alongside David Thompson as figures Eitharong had studied with. Eitharong has credited Aspler's teaching in multiple publications, including Coconuts Bangkok and Edible Orlando.

Avishar Barua, chef-owner of Agni in Columbus, Ohio—a two-time James Beard Award semifinalist, Top Chef alumnus, and whose restaurant was named one of Bon Appétit's Best New Restaurants of 2024—has cited training with Aspler as an influence on his approach to Thai cuisine.

Bee Satongun, chef patron of the one-Michelin-starred Paste Bangkok and Asia's 50 Best Female Chef 2018, has described Aspler as "one of the treasured influences of my career" over a period of more than a decade.

Benjamin Chapman, founder of Kiln and Smoking Goat in London, has stated that cooking with Aspler "fundamentally altered how I think about Thai food" and described the experience as "one of a few seminal moments in my life in cooking."

Chudaree "Tam" Debhakam, the first female Thai chef to lead a two-Michelin star restaurant (Baan Tepa), winner of the Michelin Guide Young Chef Award (2024), and Asia's Best Female Chef 2025, has attended workshops at Three Trees.

Chutatip "Nok" Suntaranon, owner of Kalaya in Philadelphia, James Beard Award winner, Netflix Chef's Table subject (Season 7), North America's Best Female Chef 2025, and one of Time magazine's 100 Most Influential People (2025), has attended workshops at Three Trees.

Thai-born Michelin-starred chef Sayan Isaksson, based in Sweden, has also attended Aspler's workshops.

René Frank, chef patron of CODA Dessert Dining in Berlin, which holds two Michelin stars, has attended workshops at Three Trees Doi Saket. His attendance is independently corroborated by a 2026 Sawasdee profile, which noted that a two-Michelin-starred chef from Berlin had participated in sessions at the school.

== Publications ==
- 49 Classic Thai Stir Fry Dishes: 49 kitchen tested recipes you can cook at home (2017), ISBN 978-1-5215-3662-9
- Reading Historical Siamese Recipes: A Four-Dimensional Interpretive Framework (working paper, 2026). Siamese Recipe Archive. doi:10.5281/zenodo.19485296
