= Top Chef Thailand season 1 =

Top Chef Thailand
- Season 1
- Hosted by: Pitipat Kootrakul
- Judges: Willment Leong; Suphamongkhon Supapipat; Thitid Tassanakajohn; Phichaya Uthantam
- No. of contestants: 15
- Winner: Chudaree Debhakam
- Location: Bangkok
- No. of episodes: 13

Release
- Original network: ONE HD
- Original release: March 25 – June 24, 2017

Season chronology
- Next → Season 2

Top Chef Thailand (season 1) is the first season of the Thai reality television series Top Chef Thailand. The season premiered on March 25, 2017, and concluded on June 24, 2017. Filming initially took place in Bangkok. Willment Leong, Suphamongkhon Supapipat, Thitid Tassanakajohn and Phichaya Uthantam served as judges and Pitipat Kootrakul as a host for the first season.

The winner of the competition was "Chef Tam" Chudaree Debhakam, and the runners-up was "Chef May" Phattanant Thongthong.

== Contestants ==
(ages stated are at start of filming)

Contestant	Age	Position	Restaurant / Office	Resident	Finish	Rank
Warasiri Thongthaem; Na Ayudhya "Chef Pete"	38	Executive Chef	Dr.Orawan Holistic and Anti-Aging Institute	Phuket	Episode 1	15
Chayant Kachaenchai "Chef Tu"	36	Owner Chef	Su-Goi By Chef Tu	Nakhon Ratchasima	Episode 1	14
Thapakorn Chinawasee "Chef Pong"	34	Food Consult	Bangkok	Bangkok	Episode 2	13
Pongsathorn Surach "Chef Nui"	27	Executive Chef	The Sky Gallery	Chonburi	Episode 3	12
Duangjai Bumrungpol "Chef Tui"	33	Owner Chef	Kitchen Hut	Bangkok	Episode 5	11
Eknarin Chuthongkham "Chef Folk"	29	Executive Chef	Chef rider X2	Bangkok	Episode 5	10
Chaiwalan Intawan "Chef Max"	38	Executive Chef	Centara Hotel	Udon Thani	Episode 5	9
Chaitphuchish Thaekingsak "Chef Huto"	28	Food Consult	Hua Chang Hotel	Bangkok	Episode 6	8
Kamol Chobdee-ngam "Chef Gigg"	38	Owner Chef	Leusthip	Bangkok	Episode 8	7
Sucharat Piyachokepaisan "Chef Namfon"	25	European Cuisine; Professor	Suan Dusit University	Bangkok	Episode 10	6
Sara Jirarat "Chef Ton"	34	Owner Chef	Aston	Bangkok	Episode 7	5
Sara Jirarat "Chef Ton"	34	Owner Chef	Aston	Bangkok	Episode 11	5
Thawatchai Akarawongwatthana "Chef Bus"	29	Owner Chef	8 Bistro	Nakhon Ratchasima	Episode 12	4
Siriporn Chaisiripanich "Chef Ooy"	46	Executive Chef	Wind Water View	Bangkok	Episode 12	3
Phattanant Thongthong "Chef May"	36	Owner Chef	Monkey's Kitchen	Chiang Mai	Episode 13	2
Chudaree Debhakam "Chef Tam"	24	Sous Chef	Blue Hill at Stone Barns	United States	Episode 13	1

== Contestant progress ==
Episode #	1	2	3	4		5			6	7	8	9	10	11	12	13
Quickfire Challenge; Winner(s)	Green team^{1}	May	Max	—N/a	—N/a	—N/a	—N/a	—N/a	May	Tam	Bus	—N/a	Ton	Bus	May	—N/a
Contestant		Elimination Challenge Results														
Tam	HIGH	WIN	HIGH	HIGH	HIGH	HIGH	HIGH	WIN	IN	IMM^{3}	LOW	IN	IN	IN	LOW	WINNER
May	IN	IMM	HIGH	HIGH	IN	HIGH	WIN	IN	WIN	LOW	WIN	IN	WIN	WIN	WIN	RUNNER-UP
Ooy	WIN	LOW	LOW	HIGH	IN	LOW	HIGH	LOW	LOW	WIN	IN	IN	LOW	IN	OUT	
Bus	IN	HIGH	HIGH	IN	IN	IN	IN	LOW	IN	IN	IMM^{4}	IN	IN	LOW	OUT	
Ton	IN	HIGH	LOW	IN	IN	WIN	IN	IN	IN	OUT		RET	IMM	OUT		
Namfon	HIGH	IN	WIN	IN	IN	IN	IN	HIGH	HIGH	WIN	IN	IN	OUT			
Gigg	IN	LOW	HIGH	WIN	IN	IN	IN	IN	IN	WIN	OUT					
Huto	IN	HIGH	HIGH	IN	WIN	IN	IN	IN	OUT							
Max	HIGH	IN	IMM	IN	HIGH	IN	LOW	OUT								
Folk	IN	HIGH	LOW	IN	IN	IN	OUT									
Tui	IN	IN	LOW	IN	HIGH	OUT										
Nui	LOW	HIGH	OUT													
Pong	IN	OUT														
Tu	OUT															
Pete	OUT															

Notes

1. Green team has members as follows: Chef Huto, Chef Gigg, Chef Namfon, Chef Max and Chef Ton.
2. Since episode 2, no contestants have been eliminated in the quickfire challenge.
3. In episode 7 Chef Tam who have been granted immunity and granted a special joint committee to review foods in elimination challenge.
4. In episode 8 Chef Bus who have been granted immunity and increase the cooking time to 10 minutes.

Elimination Challenge
(WINNER) The contestant won Top Chef Thailand.
(RUNNER-UP) The contestant was a Runner-Up.
(WIN) The contestant was winning elimination challenge.
(HIGH) Team / The contestants nominated in elimination challenge but not win.
(IN) The chef was not selected as one of the top or bottom entries in the Elimination Challenge and was safe.
(IMM) The contestant who have been granted immunity. Not eliminated that week.
(RET) The contestant was originally eliminated but returned to the competition.
(LOW) The contestant was at risk of elimination.
(OUT) The contestant was eliminated from the competition in elimination challenge.
(OUT) The contestant was eliminated from the competition in quickfire challenge.
