= Top Chef Thailand season 2 =

Top Chef Thailand
- Season 2
- Hosted by: Pitipat Kootrakul
- Judges: Willment Leong; Suphamongkhon Supapipat; Thitid Tassanakajohn; Phichaya Uthantam
- No. of contestants: 12
- Location: Bangkok
- No. of episodes: 13

Release
- Original network: ONE HD
- Original release: October 7, 2018 – January 13, 2019

Season chronology
- ← Previous; Season 1 Next → Season 3

Top Chef Thailand (season 2) is the second season of the Thai reality television series Top Chef Thailand. The season premiered on October 7, 2018. Willment Leong, Suphamongkhon Supapipat, Thitid Tassanakajohn and Phichaya Uthantam served as judges and Pitipat Kootrakul as a host for the second season.

== Contestant progress ==
Episode #	1	2	3	4	5	6	7	8	9			10	11	12	13
Quickfire Challenge; Winner(s)	Blue team^{1}	Ploy	Red team^{2}	Blue team^{3}	—N/a	Ploy	Tor	Toon	N/A			Otto	Gun	—N/a	—N/a
Otto	IN	IN	WIN	WIN	IN	IN	IN	LOW	IMM	IMM	IMM	LOW	WIN	WIN	WINNER
Gun	IN	IN	HIGH	IMM	IN	LOW	LOW	LOW	IMM	IMM	IMM	LOW	LOW	LOW	RUNNER-UP
Toon	IN	IN	IN	LOW	IN	WIN	LOW	IMM	IMM	IMM	IMM	LOW	LOW	OUT	
Gem	IN	IN	HIGH	WIN	IN	LOW	OUT		RET	IN	WIN	WIN	OUT		
Ploy	IN	IN	IN	WIN	LOW	IMM	LOW	WIN	IMM	IMM	IMM	OUT			
Tor	IN	IN	IN	LOW	IN	IN	IMM	OUT	RET	OUT					
Gee	IN	IN	LOW	LOW	IN	OUT			RET	OUT					
Steve	IN	IN	IN	WIN	OUT				RET	OUT					
Ying-Sita	IN	LOW	IMM	OUT					RET	IN	OUT				
Jaguar	IN	IN	OUT						RET	IN	OUT				
Poom	LOW	OUT							RET	OUT					
Top	OUT								RET	IN	OUT				

Notes

1. Blue team has members as follows: Chef Ying-Sita, Chef Gun, Chef Toon and Chef Steve.
2. Red team has members as follows: Chef Ying-Sita and Chef Jaguar.
3. Blue has members as follows: Chef James, Chef Ying-Sita and Chef Gun.

Elimination Challenge
(WINNER) The contestant won Top Chef Thailand.
(RUNNER-UP) The contestant was a Runner-Up.
(WIN) Team / The contestant was winning elimination challenge.
(HIGH) Team / The contestants nominated in elimination challenge but not win.
(IN) The chef was not selected as one of the top or bottom entries in the Elimination Challenge and was safe.
(IMM) The contestant who have been granted immunity. Not eliminated that week and winning elimination challenge.
(IMM) The contestant who have been granted immunity. Not eliminated that week.
(RET) The contestant was originally eliminated but returned to the competition.
(LOW) The contestant was at risk of elimination.
(OUT) The contestant was eliminated from the competition in elimination challenge.
(OUT) The contestant was eliminated from the competition in quickfire challenge.
