= Top Chef Thailand season 3 =

Top Chef Thailand
- Season 3
- Hosted by: Pitipat Kootrakul
- Judges: Willment Leong; Suphamongkhon Supapipat; Thitid Tassanakajohn; Phichaya Uthantam
- No. of contestants: 14
- Location: Bangkok
- No. of episodes: 13

Release
- Original network: ONE HD
- Original release: November 2, 2019 – February 15, 2020

Season chronology
- ← Previous; Season 2 Next → 2023

Top Chef Thailand (season 3) is the third season of the Thai reality television series Top Chef Thailand. The season premiered on November 2, 2019. Willment Leong, Suphamongkhon Supapipat, Thitid Tassanakajohn and Phichaya Uthantam served as judges and Pitipat Kootrakul as a host for the third season.

== Contestant progress ==
Episode #	3	4	5	6	7	8	9	10	11	12	13
Quickfire Challenge; Results	Blue team ★^{1}	Light blue team ★^{2}	Light blue team ★^{3}	Bas ★	Tum ★	Yugi ★ Bas ↑	Belt ★ Bom ↑	Bas ★	Bas ★	—N/a	—N/a
Bas	IN	WIN	WIN	IMM	WIN	WIN	WIN	IMM	IMM	IN	WINNER
Bom	IN	LOW	IN	LOW	LOW	LOW	LOW	LOW	LOW	LOW	RUNNER-UP
Belt	IN	LOW	LOW	IN	WIN	LOW	WIN	LOW	LOW	OUT	
Dew	IN	IN	IN	WIN	WIN	LOW	LOW	LOW	OUT		
Yugi	IMM	WIN	IN	IN	LOW	IMM	WIN	OUT			
Tum	LOW	WIN	IN	IN	WIN	LOW	OUT				
Cartoon	IN	IN	LOW	WIN	LOW	OUT					
Tue	IN	WIN	IN	LOW	OUT						
Tang	IMM	IN	IN	OUT							
Bacon	IN	IN	OUT								
Oak	IN	OUT									
James	IN	OUT									
Zeen	OUT										
Golf	OUT										

Notes

1. Blue team has members as follows: Chef Yugi and Chef Tang.
2. Light blue team has members as follows: Chef Cartoon and Chef Bas.
3. Light blue team has members as follows: Chef Bom and Chef Tue.

Quickfire Challenge
★ The chef won the Quickfire Challenge.
↑ The chef was selected as one of the top entries in the Quickfire Challenge but did not win.

Elimination Challenge
(WINNER) The contestant won Top Chef Thailand.
(RUNNER-UP) The contestant was a Runner-Up.
(WIN) Team / The contestant was winning elimination challenge.
(IN) The chefs were selected to advance to the final round.
(IN) The chef was not selected as one of the top or bottom entries in the Elimination Challenge and was safe.
(IMM) The contestant who have been granted immunity. Not eliminated that week and winning elimination challenge.
(IMM) The contestant who have been granted immunity. Not eliminated that week.
(LOW) The contestant was at risk of elimination, but wasn't the last person to advance.
(LOW) The contestant was at risk of elimination.
(OUT) The contestant was eliminated from the competition in elimination challenge.
