= Top Chef Thailand =

- Genre: Reality competition; Cooking show
- Presented by: Pitipat Kootrakul (Season 1–3)
- Judges: Willment Leong; Suphamongkhon Supapipat; Thitid Tassanakajohn; Pichaya Soontornyanakij
- Country of origin: Thailand
- Original language: Thai
- No. of seasons: 4
- No. of episodes: 54

Production
- Running time: 90 minutes
- Production companies: The One Enterprise; ME MITI (Season 1–3); Heliconia H Group (Season 4 – present)

Original release
- Network: ONE HD
- Release: March 25, 2017 – February 15, 2020
- Network: Channel 7
- Release: February 5, 2023 – present

Related
- Top Chef

Top Chef Thailand is a Thai reality competition television series. The show premiered on March 25, 2017 on ONE HD. The first season consisted of 13 episodes, with 15 contestants vying for a grand prize of ฿1,000,000. Contestants shopped at Makro Food Service. Contestants are judged by a panel of professional chefs and other notables from the food and wine industry, with one or more contestants being eliminated each week.

== Hosts and Judges ==
Judges	Season			
Judges	1	2	3	4
Willment Leong (Head)	✔	✔	✔	✔
Suphamongkhon Supapipat	✔	✔	✔	✔
Thitid Tassanakajohn	✔	✔	✔	✔
Pichaya Soontornyanakij	✔	✔	✔	✔
Hosts	Season			
Hosts	1	2	3	4
Pitipat Kootrakul	✔	✔	✔	–

== Running time ==
- All times are Indochina Time (UTC+07:00).

Season	Channel	Day	Time	Air dates
1	ONE HD	Saturday	20:20 – 21:50	March 25, 2017 – June 24, 2017 (March 15, 2017; take off the air)
1	ONE HD	Friday (Rerun)	13:00 – 14:30	March 31, 2017 – April 28, 2017
1	ONE HD	Friday (Rerun)	12:50 – 14:20	May 5, 2017 – June 30, 2017
2	ONE HD	Sunday	18:20 – 19:50	October 7, 2018 – January 13, 2019
3	ONE HD	Saturday	20:10 – 22:00	November 2, 2019 – February 15, 2020
4	Channel 7	Sunday	18:00 – 19:50	February 5 – May 28, 2023

== Show Format ==
- Quickfire Challenge round (Speed, skills, and solve unexpected problems test): The warm up competition for contestants before the Elimination Challenge. The winners of this competition will be eligible, which has the advantage of the next race. In this round, one contestant will be eliminated. (only in episode 1)
- Elimination Challenge round (Knockout stage): The contestants prepare one or more dishes to meet the challenge requirements. In this round, at the least one contestant will be eliminated.
- Elimination Quickfire Challenge (Special knockout stage): The special round in episode 12, this round is like the Quickfire Challenge round. In this round, at the least one contestant will be eliminated.
- Restaurant Wars is a competition round from Season 4 where the two chefs with the best restaurant concepts compete by opening real restaurants.
- Judges' Table In Season 4, the Judges' Table adopted the original format where contestants don't receive immediate feedback. Instead, the top 3 contestants are critiqued and the winner announced first. Then, the bottom 3 contestants receive their critiques. After a break for judge deliberation, the eliminated contestant from the bottom group is called back and told, "Please pack your knives and leave Top Chef" by the host or judges.

== Seasons ==
Season	Winner	Runner(s)-up	Finalists	Episodes	Air Dates
1	Chudaree Debhakam	Phattanant Thongthong	15	13	March 25, 2017 – June 24, 2017
2	Prapas Panawira	Sorawis Saengvanich	12	13	October 7, 2018 – January 13, 2019
3	Wattanasak Changkeb	Chupong Srinuch	14	13	November 2, 2019 – February 15, 2020
4	Arttasit Pattanasatienkul	Teo Zheng Yi Enoch; Wisakha Rawichan	16	15	February 5 – May 28, 2023
