= Theppawong =

Theppawong (Thai: เทพวงศ์) is a Thai surname used by descendants of Chao Phiriya Theppawong (1836–1912), the last ruler of Phrae.

It is also the romanized spelling of a homophonic but different surname, เทพวงค์. Notable people with the surname include:

- Boontawee Theppawong (born 1996), Thai footballer
