= Chaophraya Phatsakorawong =

- ภาสกรวงศ์
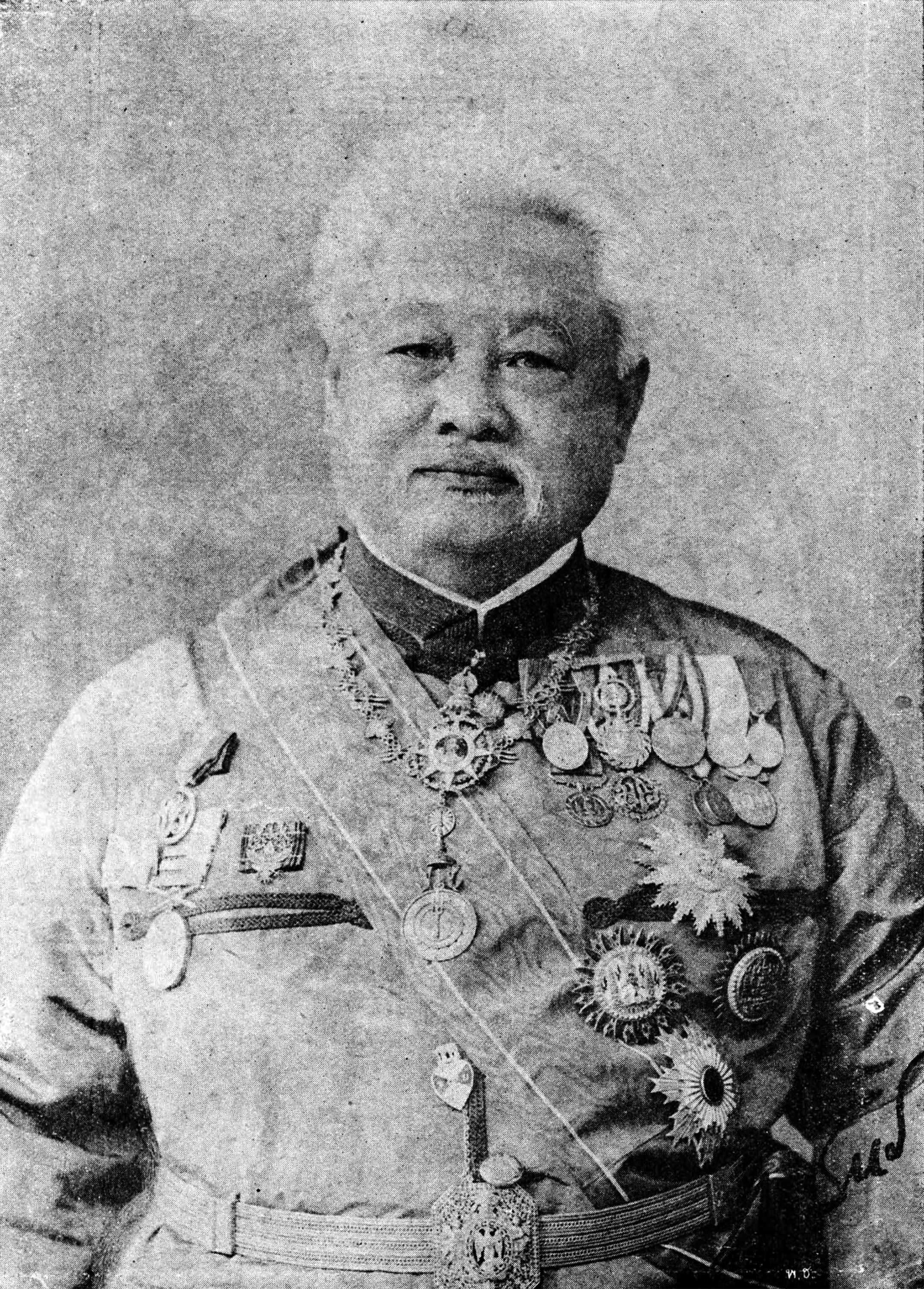

Minister of Agriculture
- In office 1892–1894
- Preceded by: Office established
- Succeeded by: Chaophraya Surasakmontri

Minister of Education
- In office 1882–1902
- Preceded by: Office established
- Succeeded by: Chaophraya Wichitwong Wutthikrai

Personal details
- Spouse: Plian Phasakorawong

Chaophraya Phatsakorawong (Thai: เจ้าพระยาภาสกรวงศ์), born as Porn Bunnag (Thai: พร บุนนาค), was a Siamese nobleman and politician. A member of the Bunnag family, Phatsakorawong served as the first Minister of Agriculture from 1892 to 1894 and the first minister of education from 1892 to 1902.

Phatsakorawong was married to Thanphuying Plian Phasakorawong.
