= Ngiao rebellion =

1902 uprising in Siam

Ngiao Rebellion
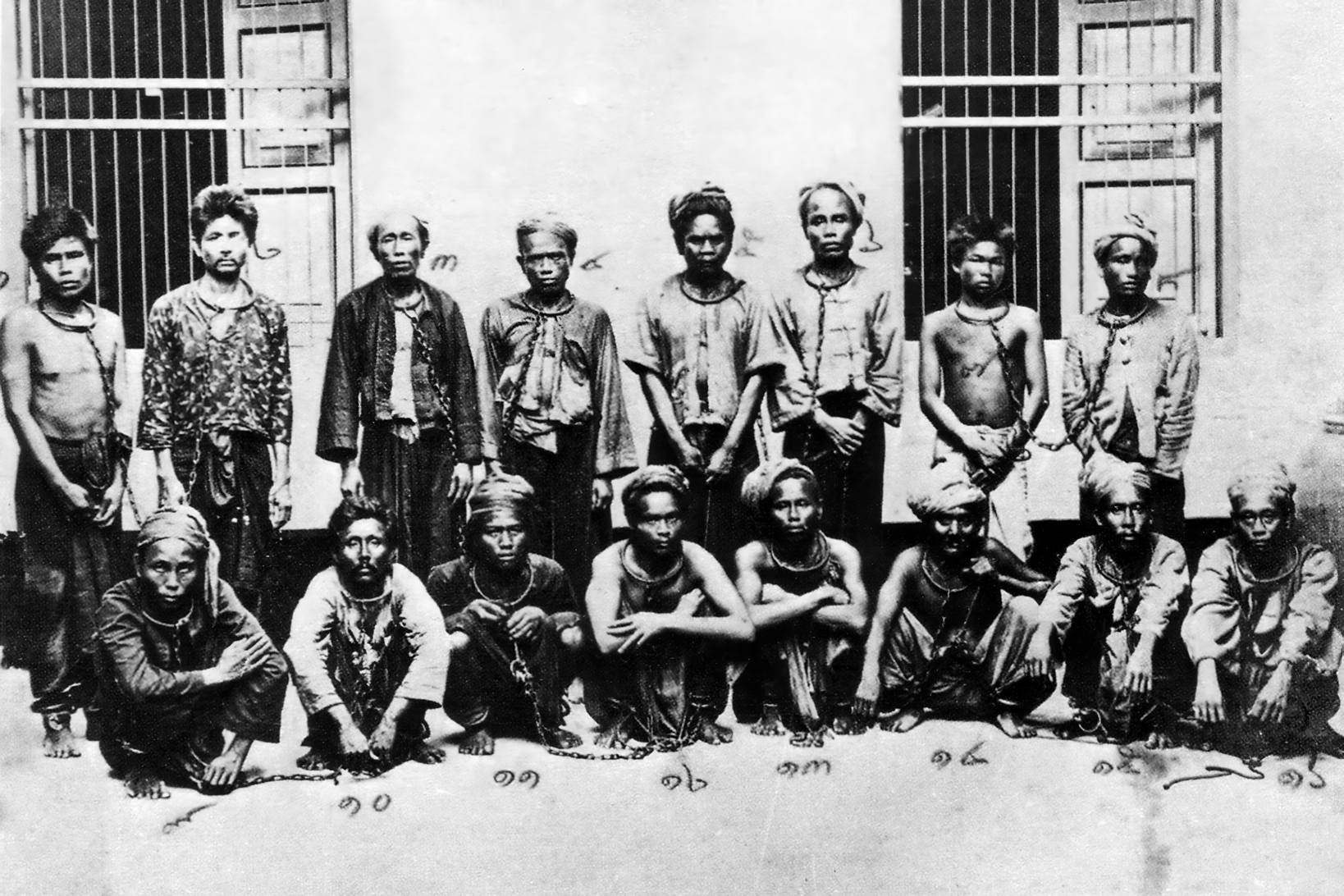
- Captured Shan (Ngiao) rebels
Date	25 July 1902 – 22 May 1904 (1 year, 10 months)
Location	Phrae Province, Siam
Result	Siamese victory

Belligerents
Shan (Ngiao) Rebels	(Thailand) Siam

Commanders and leaders
Phaka Mong †; Sala Po Chai †; Phiriya Theppawong	(Thailand) Chulalongkorn (Thailand) Surasakmontri (Thailand) Phraya Chaiboon †; Louis Leonowens (Denmark) Gustav Schau (Denmark) Hans Jensen †

Strength
300+	6,000+

Casualties and losses
37+ 16 (POW)	36+

The Ngiao rebellion (Thai: กบฏเงี้ยว), also called the Phrae City Rebellion and the 1902 Shan rebellion, was an uprising of Tai Yai (Shan, historically known in Thai as Ngiao) people against Siamese rule, in what is now Phrae province in northern Thailand between 25 July and 14 August in 1902. It arose as resistance to centralizing reforms initiated by King Chulalongkorn, particularly the levying of taxes and the adoption of the Monthon Thesaphiban provincial administration system, as well as the partitioning of territory with the British, which forced the Shan to adopt either British or Siamese nationality.

In the morning of 25 July 1902, rebels attacked and looted the town of Phrae, killing over twenty government officials including the royal commissioner, Phraya Ratcharitthanon. The rebellion was soon quelled by troops from Bangkok led by Chaophraya Surasakmontri, as well as Siamese troops commanded by British and Danish officials. Ten rebel leaders were executed, sixteen were taken to Bangkok for imprisonment, and Chao Phiriya Theppawong, the ruler of Phrae, escaped into exile in Luang Phrabang. The rebellion, aimed at overthrowing Siamese rule over Lanna, continued onward as an insurgency until 22 May 1904 and spanned across Northern Siam.

The revolt was part of several acts of resistance that arose in the fringes of the country in the 1890s to early 1900s. A few months earlier, the Holy Man's Rebellion in the Northeast saw rebels sack the town of Khemmarat before being routed by the Siamese army. While it was unclear whether and to what extent the local rulers supported the rebellion in Phrae, the local lordship of Phrae was ended, and further reforms were put into place that helped Siam fully annex the former lands of Lanna and assimilate its people.

== History ==
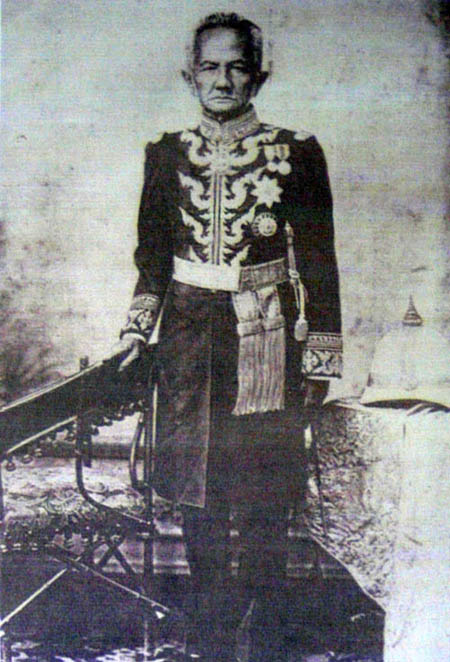
Phiriya Theppawong, last king of Phrae

=== Background ===
During the reign of King Chulalongkorn (Rama V) and his predecessor, Siam had lost numerous territories to France and Britain, normally lands ethnically non-Thai. In 1885, Siam was forced to cede its northern Shan provinces, which partitioned the Shan people between British and Siamese rule. In order to tighten and retain the land left, King Chulalongkorn began passing reforms which centralized the country around Bangkok and reduce the power of local rulers, with local rulers in the country's north being forced to hand over higher taxes and most of their power.

On 10 October 1899, a previous revolt occurred in Chiang Mai against increased taxes. The revolt was led by Phya Pap and aimed to install him as king and expel all Siamese and Chinese people from the area. The revolt was poorly organized and collapsed quickly.

In Muang Prae, Phraya Chaiboon (Thongyuu Suwanbat) was appointed as governor in 1897. The previous leader Chao Phiriya Theppawong had previously ruled Phrae as the local king under Siamese vassalization similar to Kingdom of Chiang Mai and other northern states.

One of the principal leaders of the rebellion, Phaka Mong, fled to Siam from Kengtung due to large amounts of debt he owed to the local ruler. In Siam, his main revenue was banditry.

=== Tensions before the rebellion ===
In early July 1902, Siamese police attempted to arrest a group of Shans in a ruby mine in Baan Baw Kao, south of Phrae town, without consulting the head of the mine, Sala Po Chai. The Shans resisted and fighting broke out with the police, resulting in the death of several policemen. The police retreated from the mine and assembled a force of 80 police and soldiers equipped with horses and elephants. They then began advancing back towards the mine on 23 July but were ambushed by the Shans in a ravine which led to the mine. The ambush destroyed the Siamese who fled to Lampang. Here, the Shan killed 16 Siamese and took possession of the Siamese equipment which included horses, elephants, guns and ammunition. Knowing that they would face retaliation from the Siamese in the future, the Shans led by Sala Po Chai and Phaka Mong set out on a rebellion.

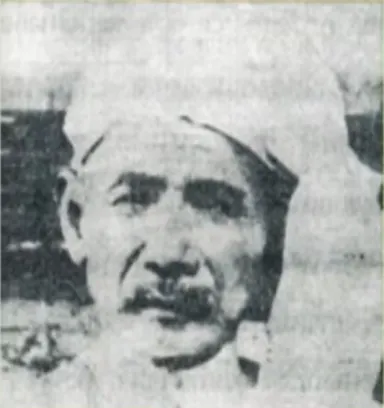
Photo of Phaka Mong, leader of the Shan rebels until his death

=== Early days ===
On 25 July, 50 Ngiao rioters stormed the local police station in Phrae and due to the small amount of officers inside, easily took over the station and seized weapons, killing numerous policemen. Despite warnings, Phraya Chaiboon had not permit the police to have ammunition, most likely as he did not trust the police as they were recruited locally. Afterwards, rioters destroyed telegraph lines and stormed the governor Phraya Chaiboon's residence. However, Chaiboon had already fled the town with his wife Lady Yean to seek help. With the governor gone, the rioters took the treasury's money totalling 46,910 Baht and killed the remaining servants in the building. The rebels also managed to equip themselves with Austro-Hungarian Mannlicher–Schönauer rifles after storming the police station. They then went to the local prison to increase their numbers from 50 to 300. In the chaos, many villagers fled Phrae, although the rioters told the town folk that they would not be harmed but instead the Siamese who ruled over them. Led by Phaka Mong, their numbers soon increased with local villagers joining their cause. The leaders, Slapochai and Phaka Mong, travelled to Khum Chao Luang where they convinced Phiriya Theppawong there to join their cause and to also provide food and weapons. The rebels also presented their case to British officials in the town who were employed by the Siamese Forestry Department. Paka Mong stated the Shans' situation of "constant oppression by the Siamese officials" and their demand to oust the oppressive Siamese and restore the ruler's former power.

On 26 July, the Ngiao began hunting ethnic Central Thais (Siamese), but also encouraged their murder through prizes totalling 400 Baht per person, including women and children.

Three days after fleeing Phrae, Chaiboon went to local villagers in Ban Rong Kat to beg for food. In hopes of taking a prize, one of the villagers reported Chaiboon to the rioters and he was later arrested. Once back in Phrae, the Shan began forcing him to give up Phrae to the Shan, although he never signed. Chaiboon was later killed by one of the rioters, Jeong Shen, after challenging them to kill him. The site of Chaiboon's death is now a monument and Chaiboon was later promoted to Phraya Ratcharittanon Paholpolpakdee. Along with Chaiboon, numerous Siamese officials were murdered. However the former treasurer of the Phrae, Phra Wichai Racha, hid three Siamese government officials from being murdered by rioters. In addition to the local residents, Westerners were unharmed such as Dr. Thomas who led an American Presbyterian mission in Phrae. In total, 20 Siamese officials were murdered, making it the largest massacre of Central Thai officials in Northern Thailand.

=== Battle of Lampang ===
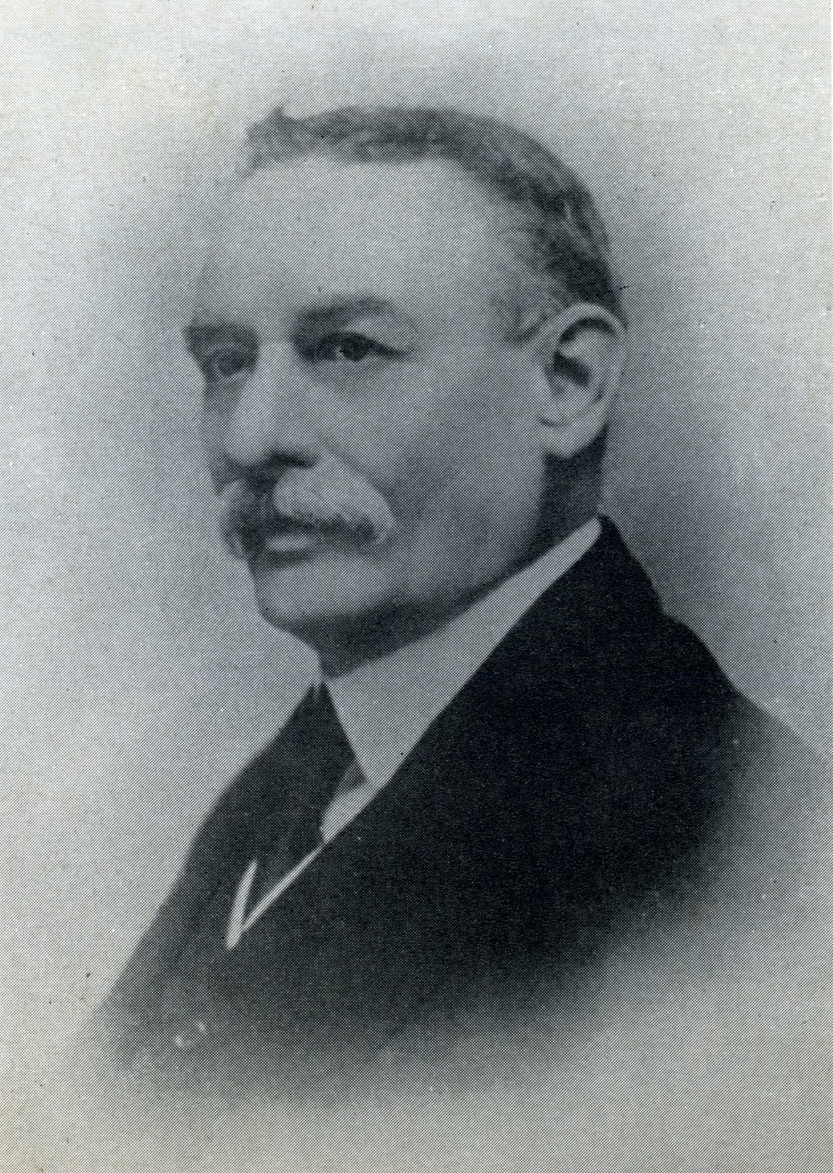
Louis Leonowen was a close friend to Chulalongkorn and organized defenses around Lampang

Upon learning of the situation in Phrae, King Chulalongkorn assigned Chao Phraya Surasak Montri to lead Siamese forces from Bangkok to suppress the rebellion whilst local troops from nearby towns were called in to assist. Upon learning that Surasak Montri was heading north, the Shan split their army into two divisions - with Salapochai leading the men in the south whilst Phaka Mong lead troops to attack Lampang. Bolden by their success in Phrae, Phaka Mong and Sala Po Chai drew up plans for the liberation of Northern Thailand, planning to continue on to Chiang Mai, Lamphun, Phayao and Chiang Saen after a victory at Lampang.

News of a Shan attack on Lampang came from Nai Fuang, a judge from Phrae, who escaped and telegraphed this information of 26 July. The King of Lampang, Bunwatwongse Manit began preparing his town's defences by assembling a force of 1,000 irregulars. To prevent Lampang's prisoners from joining the rebels like the prisoners in Phrae did, all the prisoners were executed. From Chiang Mai, 54 policemen were sent to Lampang under the command of Danish captain Hans Markvard Jensen. Jensen had arrived in Siam as a police trainer from Denmark. They arrived on 29 July. At the same time Lampang at been substantially fortified, with nine v-shaped teak barricades erected under the orders of British teak company officials blocked major roads into the town. Most of the town's defenses had been coordinated by Louis Leonowens, son of Anna Leonowens.

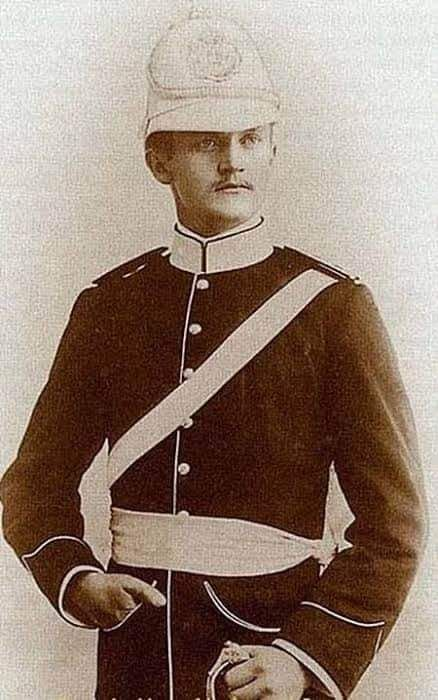
Hans Markvard Jensen in uniform

On 3 August, Phaka Mong's forces arrived at Lampang and began attacking the town on 4 August during dawn with 200 men. His forces advanced towards Chao Bunwatwongse's residence along Bunwat road and while another was beside the Wang river. The Shans along the river seized the barricades there but the forces along Bunwat road failed to take barricades held by Captain Jensen and Lt Tjoen. Jensen then led his forces to fire upon the Shans along the riverside. Along the riverside, the Shan came under constant fire including from Leonowen who was firing from the Chao's residence where he was protecting the Chao and the Siamese Commissioner. The Shans began fleeing from Lampang before being followed behind by Lampang's forces who were promised 300 Baht for each Shan soldier. This counteroffensive would end up killing at least 25 Shans, including Phaka Mong. Together, their heads were displayed in front of the Chao's residence on sticks.

Despite Phaka Mong's failed offensive, officials in Chiang Mai and Lampang were still unsure on whether the Shans would launch further attacks. In Chiang Mai, the city gates were barricaded and 5,000 soldiers were recruited in the city's defences. Under Jensen and Leonowen, the Chao of Lampang was evacuated to Chiang Mai. This however caused Lampang to fall into anarchy for three days with widespread killing and looting as they were without any rulers. On 7 August, Bunwatwongse returned to Lampang and restored order. For Captain Jensen's role in defending Lampang, Chulalongkorn intended to promote Jensen to rank of Major General and bestow him with the Order of the Crown of Siam and 10,000 baht. However Jensen was later shot dead at 24 along with Lt Tjoen by Shan rebels on 14 October 1902 at Muang Ngao after being abandoned by his men, apart from Tjoen. Chulalongkorn honoured Jensen by paying an annual pension of 3,000 baht to his mother until her death in 1938. The King also donated an obelisk to Jensen's grave in Chiang Mai.

=== Siamese capture of Phrae ===
On 5 August, the 24 year old British vice-consul based in Nan, Harold Lyle, was dispatched by British officials in Chiang Mai arrived into Phrae and moved into the former residence Phraya Chaiyabun in an attempt to restore order. Lyle began writing to Sala Po Chai urging him to not engage with Surasak Montri in battle. He also attempted to raise the morale of the foreign residences by organizing a game of polo. On 7 August, defeated Shans from the Battle of Lampang started returning to Phrae where Lyle encouraged them to disperse and flee to British Shan territories. However, Sala Po Chai did not follow Lyle's wishes and Lyle rode 8 km on 13 August to meet with recently arrived Siamese forces under the authority of the governor of Pichai, Srisuriyarajvaranuwat. There, he delayed the Siamese from entering Phrae by saying that Phrae had no rice to feed his men and that if they encountered a Shan army, they would be destroyed. This was due to his fears that it would result in a massacre of local and foreign residences for three days. During this, more Siamese soldiers arrived and were led by Danish commander-in-chief of the Siamese Provincial Military Police Gustav Schau. At the same time, Salapochai's forces in the south were defeated by armies from Sawankhalok and Sukhothai. On 16 August the governor of Pichai, Phraya Srisuriyarajvaranuwat, led provincial police and took over Phrae. Surasak Montri arrived in Phrae on 20 August.

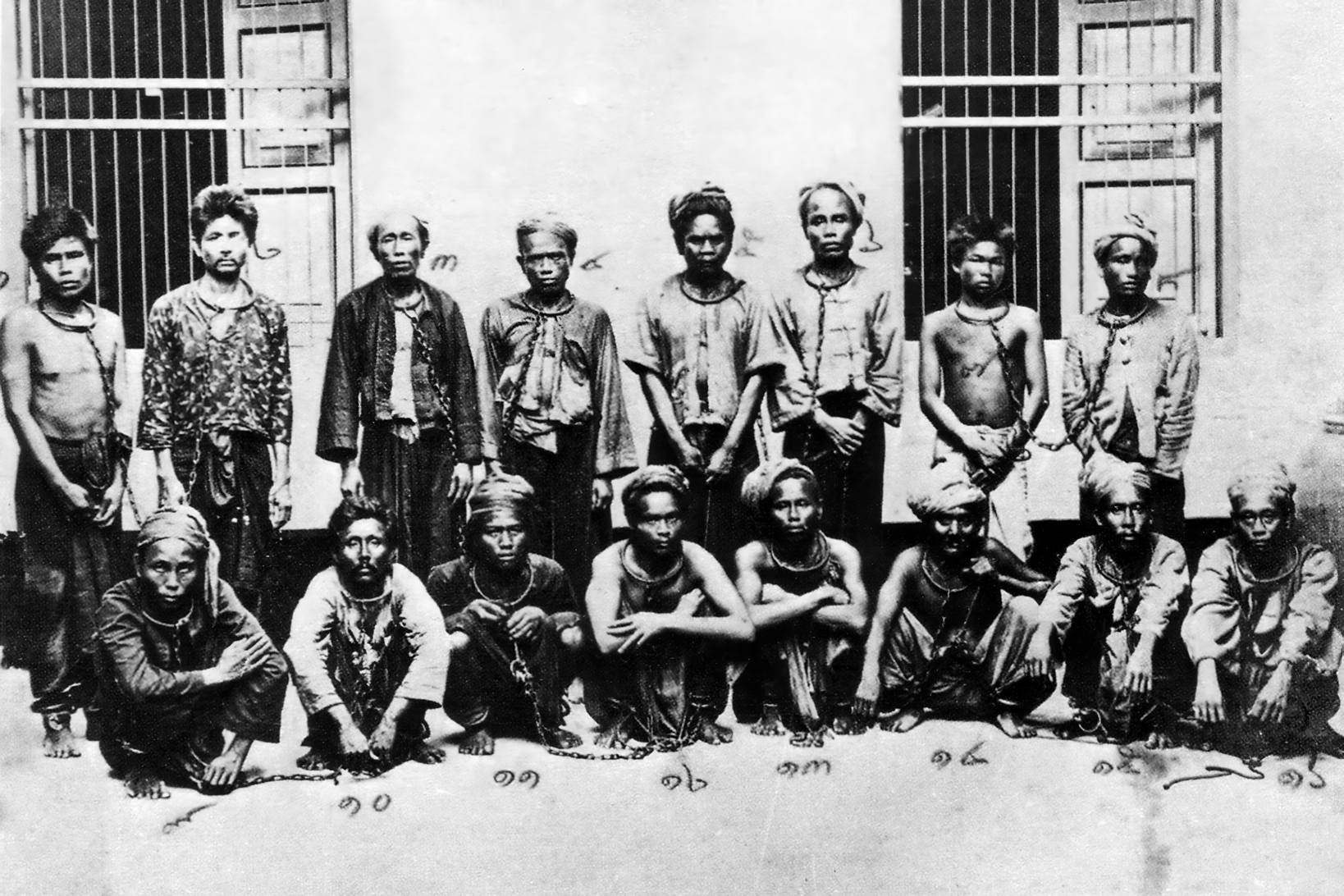
The 16 captured Shan rebels after they were sent to Bangkok for trial

=== Immediate aftermath in Phrae ===
With the death of Sala Po Chai and Phaka Mong, the Shan rebels mostly dispersed. 10 Shan rebels were however executed in Phrae whilst 16 were captured and sent to Bangkok for a trial. Majority of these prisoners faced 9 months to 2 years of imprisonment for their involvement in the Battle of Lampang. Some were sentenced 15 and 12 years.

After arriving on 20 August, Surasak Montri began investigating the rebellion's cause, coming to the conclusion to the support of the governor, Chao Phiriya Theppawong, helped the rebellion grow. Before punishing the governor, Chao Ratchawong and his wife drank poison, committing suicide. Fearing that this would cause a misunderstanding and the Siamese government will be accused of causing violence against the governor, Chaophraya Surasakmontri began spreading rumours that the ruler of Phrae will be arrested. Chao Phiriya Theppawong would later escape Phrae with two close friends. He was however supported by Surasakmontri who gave secret orders to local troops around the city to not intercept him. Chao Phiriya Theppawong would later escape to Luang Prabang, which was under French colonial rule. After 15 days, it was considered that he abandoned all of his duties and Surasakmontri ordered Chao Piriya Thepwong's removal from his position, making Phiriya Theppawong the last king of Phrae. In his absence, he was charged with rebellion and sentenced to death. Piriya lived out the rest of his life in Luang Prabang until his death 10 years later in 1912.

Also during the Siamese investigation into the rebellion, there were claims that Myingun Prince, son of the last king of Burma Mindon Min and anti-British figure exiled in Saigon, had involvements in the rebellion. They said that Myingun had been involved in the rebellion and that it was part of a wider plot to restore him to the Burmese throne. Most historians see this as being unlikely.

=== Guerilla war ===
==== Relations with the French ====
Following their defeat, some Shan rebels regrouped north of Phrae around Chiang Saen and Chiang Khong along the Lao side of the Mekong near the point where today the borders of Myanmar, Thailand and Laos meet. Their arrival in Chiang Saen was around September or October, while it was either October or November for Chiang Khong. Almost immediately after arriving in Chiang Khong, they threatened the chief of the village and told him to drive out the Siamese from it. This was due to Bangkok having assigned a Siamese postal official to Chiang Khong to provide a minimal Siamese presence in the zone.

The Shans were however protected from Siamese military retribution as they were in a reserve zone in territory the French were interested in, which for the Siamese was demilitarized. The French were interested in pushing their control into the reserve zone and were sheltering the rebels in the hope that they would destabilize Siamese control. The Shan leaders had also presented the local French commercial agent asking for French protection, with one of the Shan signatories being Phaya Lassavong.

In December 1902, French authorities seized letters in Luang Namtha sent by Lassavong from a village controlled by France near Chiang Khong to the local rulers of Chiang Hung urging them to send 500 soldiers to the Shan rebels for renewed attacks against the Siamese in January 1903. The letters also said that the Shans would be fighting alongside the French. The French were however alarmed by the letters' implications on their security and diplomacy and moved to arrest Lassavong. Following several night-time raids and short skirmishes, French authorities captured Lassavong and his son, moving them both to Muang Sing. As prisoner, Lassavong was forced to write to the chiefs of Chiang Hung telling them to not come south and that any rescue attempts would result in his and his son's executions. The French then made plans to put Lassavong on trial in Muang Sing, while handing his son over to the Siamese for his alleged murder of the ruler of Nan's son.

Renee Chevalier was the main French diplomat when dealing with the Shans. Chevalier also refused one of the Shan leader's request to fly the French flag during an attack against the Siamese. A Shan had previously flown the French flag against the Siamese in 1899. Chevalier also tried to persuade the Shans to stop logging due to tensions it caused with the Siamese. The Shans however claimed that they had been given the green-light to begin by the French. But by December 1902, the Shan loggers fled into French Laos to avoid being arrested by the Siamese. One of the leading Shan loggers was Ziyadagazina, who was a Shan leader in Chiang Saen, ran a timber operation, was the protégé of Myingun Prince, and maintained good relations with the French.

==== Failed attack on Chiang Rai ====
One of the first Shan expeditions out of the reserve town and back into Siam occurred a few weeks after their arrival. A group of around 20 Shans travelled to Chiang Rai in order to recover the family and elephants of one of their members. On their way, they sought shelter from a Shan trader in Mae Khi, Chai Prakan District. However, Siamese police arrived in the middle of night and a skirmish occurred between the police and Shans, resulting in the injury of three Siamese. Following this, both the Siamese police and the local ruler of Mae Khi fled, leaving it to the Shans. The leader of the group, Si Song Muong, declared himself the ruler of Chiang Rai province, and the Shans burnt down the former ruler's residence. Emboldened, Si Song Muong led the group towards Chaing Rai aiming to capture it. The Shans faced little resistance before coming to a river crossing where the Siamese had destroyed a bridge. The Siamese police then killed two Shans, who then fled back to Chiang Saen.

Not having yet heard of Si Song Muong's defeat and only his victory at Mae Khi, Chao Noi Can, who was one of the chiefs of Chiang Saen, set out to join Si Song Muong with 60 men. After a few hours, he came across Si Song Muong's force and turned back Chiang Saen. The following day, the Siamese recaptured Mae Khi with 400 men. Si Song Muong's force had then disbanded, with his men either fleeing to Burma or Laos.

Some of the guns used by Si Song Muong's men had been given by the French to Ziyadagazina in late 1902, who also had relations with Si Song Muong, and Chao Noi Can. Fearing that the Siamese would accuse the French of arming the Shans, diplomat Renee Chevalier negotiated for the return of the eight rifles.

Throughout 1903, the Shan led raids on northern towns. The chief of Chiang Khong also found himself repeatedly harassed and isolated by the Shans so much that he sought French help in disarming the Shans. The Shans were however without effective leadership during this period, with the French commissioner from Mueang Sing calling the Shans a 'turbulent population' when he visited in early 1903. In March 1904, the chief of Chiang Khong abandoned the village and sought refuge with the French. He was then replaced by a Shan rebel, but by May, the village had descended into anarchy.

The Siamese became fed up with the Shan rebels. Surasak Montri destroyed Baan Baw Kao village where the rebellion originated. Surasak himself had faced insurgencies and rebels in the north before as a veteran of the Haw wars. Across the north, villages were destroyed by the Siamese if they had signs of rebel activity.

==== Ta Pha affair ====
Particularly one incident would affect Siam's relations with the British. 30 Shans and 100 Laotians seized Ta Pha and forced the villages to construct barricades. On 26 October 1902, hundreds of Siamese soldiers entered Ta Pha village in modern Phayao province. Ta Pha housed a Bombay Burmah Trading Corporation (BBTC) compound which was owned by the British. The rebels had erected several barricades along roads, but as the Siamese approached, the Shans fled. However, the Siamese still fired salvos onto Ta Pha and entered the BBTC compound and took down their company flag. At least five locals were killed along with several BBTC women. From the compound, one Burmese and one Shan who worked on the teak plantation were executed outside Ta Pha and the Siamese spent five days destroying the village. Harold Lyle was suspicious that British subjects did anything wrong and travelled to Ta Pha along with the French consul Lugan and Belgian lawyer Robyns. This would cause outrage from the British where they insisted on an investigation of the massacre. In late 1903, the commander of the Siamese forces at Ta Pha, Datsakorn, was sentenced to 12 years of imprisonment.

Map of Siamese territorial loss showing the area ceded to France in 1904

==== End of the insurgency ====
French colonial authorities had previously seen the rebellion as a way to expand French control over Siam, particularly over the reserve zone. In December 1902, the French consul in Nan suggested that France should revoke previous agreements with Siam in favour of a more aggressive approach. The Shans were also becoming problematic towards the French, and causing further tensions with Siam, potentially drawing the French towards a conflict with Siam.

After receiving information in April 1904 about an upcoming attack on Chiang Rai, the Siamese requested French permission to enter the reserve zone. Previously on 13 February 1904, Siam and France had signed the a new treaty where Siam ceded the rest of its control over Laos to the French. This treaty also eliminated the reserve zone as it came under French control. Now that the rebels were in French territory and were no use to the French, the colonial French administration also now wanted to eliminate the Shan rebels. The Governor-General of French Indochina approved the Siamese request and Siamese soldiers and artillery entered the reserve zone in the middle of May. They captured Chiang Khong easily from the Shan as they quickly retreated to the opposite side of the Mekong. However, resistance in Chiang Saen repelled the Siamese attack on 20 May, but on 22 May the Siamese captured the village.

Following the Siamese recapture, they reinstated the chief of Chiang Khong from his exile in France. Rivals to him who collaborated with the Shans were imprisoned. France however continued to harbour over 50 Shans who escaped into Laos.

== Effects ==
After the rebellion, logging previously overseen by local rulers was handed over to Western companies such as the East Asiatic Company and the Bombay Burma Trading Corporation. This would cause economic growth in Phrae province, with many banks and businesses being set up to cater to the increasing logging trade and the increase in population.

The rebellion of a northern state against Bangkok helped fasten Siamese incorporation at the cost of traditional northern authorities. It also encouraged larger state investment into northern railways instead of agricultural infrastructure.
