= Phiriya Theppawong =

Last king of Phrae

Phiriya Thepphawong
- Chao
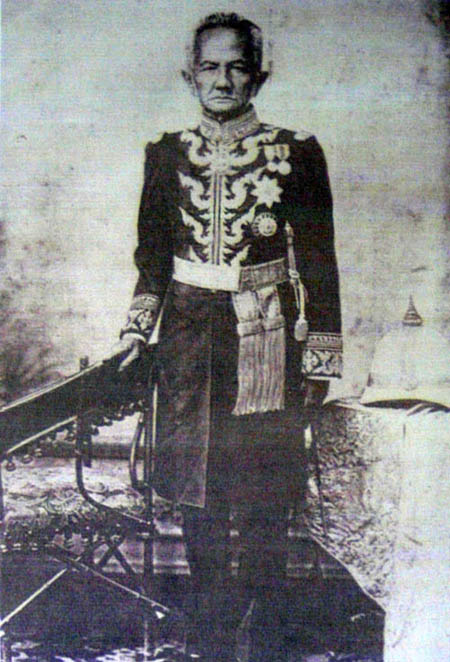
- 1889

Ruler of Phrae
- Reign: 5 April 1889 – 25 September 1902
- Predecessor: Pimpisarn Raja
- Successor: Monarchy abolished; Replaced by Governor appointed from Bangkok
- Born: 17 February 1836
- Died: 1912 (aged 75–76); Luang Prabang, French Indochina
- Spouse: Buatha Mahisapanya; Buakham; Bua Kaew; Khampor; Nang Thian; 2 unknown wives
- Issue: 10 Children
- Dynasty: Saen Sai (ราชวงศ์แสนซ้าย)
- Father: Pimpisarn Raja

Chao Phiriya Thepphawong (Thai: เจ้าพิริยเทพวงษ์; born Noi Thepphawong Thai: น้อยเทพวงศ์; 17 February 1836 - 1912) was the 5th and last ruler of the mueang of Phrae from 5 April 1889 until the title's abolishment on 25 September 1902, which marked the end of Phrae as a vassal state of Siam from the Saen Sai dynasty.

Born during the reign of his grandfather Phraya Intawichai to future ruler Pimpisarn Raja, he would ascend to the throne in 1890. Phiriya ruled over Phrae during a period of time where the powers of local rulers were diminishing and when Siam became more centralized around Bangkok as a result of reforms undertakened by Siamese King Chulalongkorn. Anger and resentment towards the Siamese would result in the Shan-led Ngiao rebellion of 1902. The Shans, led by Phaka Mong and Sala Po Chai, took over Mueang Phrae and forced Phiriya to join and provide food and weapons to the rebel. After the Shans were defeated by the Siamese at the Battle of Lampang and another battle with the governor of former Phichai province resulted in mass disorganisation and the recapture of Phrae.

Following this, under the pressure of Surasak Montri and a possible arrest, Phiriya fled Phrae where he went into exile in Luang Prabang, French Indochina. In Luang Prabang, he remarried and had children before dying in 1912.

In Thai literature, he is often branded as a traitor but revered in Phrae who view him as being 'innocent' in the Ngiao rebellion and a 'hero' for protecting Phrae from suffering from destruction. In Phrae, the Tam Roi Chao Luang celebration is held in memory of Phiriya.

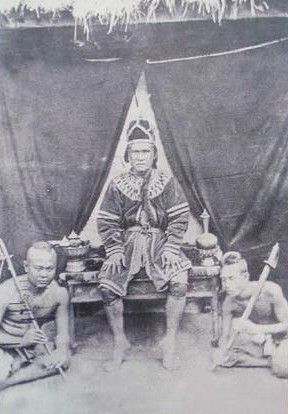
Phiriya's father, Pimpisarn Raja

== Early life ==
Phiriya Thepphawong was born on 17 February 1836 as the youngest son of Pimpisarn Raja during the reign of his grandfather Phraya Intawichai. Like the other local rulers in Lan Na, they were all related. In his youth, he studied Thai.

Phraya would die in 1847 and be succeeded by his son Pimpisarn Raja as king of Phrae. In 1878, he was appointed Phraya Viceroy in 1878 when his father became ill. His father would later die in 1890 and Phiriya succeeded him as king. In 1897, his powers as ruler would again be reduced when Phraya Chaiboon (Thongyuu Suwanbat) was appointed as the governor of Muang Prae (Phrae) by authorities from Bangkok.

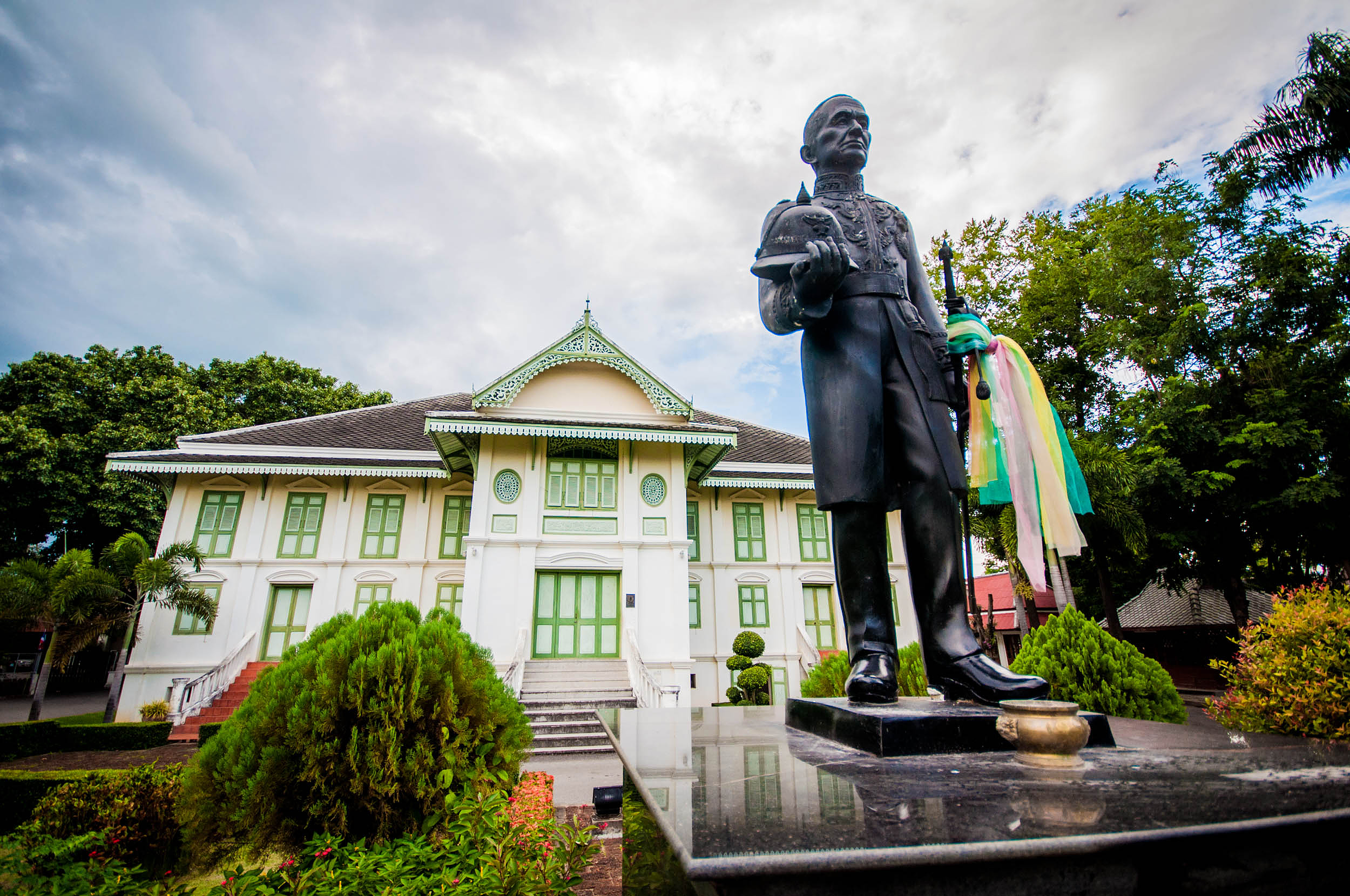
Khum Chao Luang with a statue of Phiriya Theppawong outside

== Civic Works ==
Between 1889 and 1892, Phiriya constructed a new royal residence, Khum Chao Luang (translates to 'the Prince's residence) made from teak in the style of a traditional home influenced by Victorian architecture. His residence also served as Phrae's prison. The residence is now a museum and major tourist attraction in Phrae.

Phiriya also ordered the construction of the first school in Phrae named Thepwong school which operated as a boys-only school and opened on 20 July 1900. Later on in 1900 it was renamed to Piriyalai school by King Rama VI. Several years after the abolishment of Phiriya's rule over the region in 1912, the 4th governor of Phrae, Phraya Nikrakittikarn, moved it to its current position. On 21 October 1913, it reopened for classes and a statue of Phiriya was erected near it. The school was attended by several notable people, including several governors and MPs.

In 1901, he financed 637 Baht for a new prison to replace the old and over-crowded prison already present. Several Buddhist temples were restored and renovated under his rule.

== Ngiao Rebellion ==
As Central Thai rule was unpopular among the local Shan people, 50 rioters stormed the local police and post office on 24 July 1902 in an act that would begin the Ngiao rebellion. The rebels, now numbering in the hundreds, were led by Slapochai and Phaka Balm who travelled to Phiriya's residence in Khum Chao Luang where they allegedly convinced him to support their movement and to also provide food, supplies and weapons to the rebels. Under rebel control, local Central Thais were rounded up and executed, including the governor Thongyuu Suwanbat. The rebellion would end when Chao Phraya Surasak Montri led Siamese soldiers to Phrae. Fearing his army, the rebels would split into 2 armies which were simultaneously defeated. On August 4, Phrae would be recaptured by provincial forces led by the Governor of Pichai, Phraya Srisuriyarajvaranuwat. Following the rebellion's end, Surasak Montri led an investigation around the rebellion, coming to the conclusion that Phiriya's support helped the movement grow. Fearing punishment, Phiriya's family and wife committed suicide by drinking poison. Fearing that this would cause a misunderstanding where the Siamese government would be accused of violence against the Royal Family, Surasakmontri began spreading rumours that Phiriya will be arrested. Scared by these rumours, Phiriya escaped Phrae with 2 friends. His escape was supported by Surasamontri who gave out secret orders to troops stationed around the city to not prevent his escape. After 15 days, it was determined that he abandoned his positions against ruler and the role of king would be abolished by Surasakmontri on September 25, 1902.

== Exile ==
In the early days of fleeing Phrae, he told one of his sons to flee northeast alone with a one bag of his belongings. He would later marry a Lan Na woman and establish a family together.

Phiriya Thepphawong would live out the rest of his life in exile in Luang Prabang. He would remarry to the daughter of Chao Viceroy Luang Prabang and together had one son named Kham Thepwong. Before his passing, Kham promised to Phiriya to visit his relatives in Phrae but he fell ill and died in Phrae. Phiriya Thepphawong died in 1912 while still in exile, either in Luang Prabang or in Xam Nuea.

== Legacy ==
His former royal residence became the new residence of the Phrae governor and a home for Ananda Mahidol to stay when he was visiting the area.

During the late 1990s and early 2000s, Phiriya experienced a resurgence in popularity, often being seen as 'innocent' by locals in Phrae and instead of a traitor, a selfless person to the Phrae people. Along with the Ngiao rebellion, he helped contribute to Phrae being seen as a rebel city within Thailand.

== Family ==
Phiriya Thepphawong would marry a total of 7 women and would beget 10 children, including 3 son and 7 daughters.

Spouse	Children
Buatha Mahisapanya	No Children
Buakham	Nansom Kaen Chanhom
Buakham	Inta Kaen Chanhom
Buakham	Tong Kaen Chanhom
Buakham	Plain Kaen Chanhom
Unknown Wife	Chao Nantan
Bua Kaew	Kham Mun Thepwong
Khampor	Bunpan Thepwong
Nang Thiang	Pin Uttarapong Thepwong
Nang Thiang	Chan/Noi Thepwong
Daughter of the Chao Viceroy Luang Prabang	Kham Thepwong/Intaraprasong
