= Mae Khrua Hua Pa =

1908 Siamese cookbook

Mae Khrua Hua Pa (Thai: แม่ครัวหัวป่าก์) is a Siamese cookbook written by Than Phu Ying Plean Phatsakorawong in 1908.

== Title Meaning ==
The meaning of the title 'Mae Khrua Hua Pa' in English is 'The Lady Chef'.

== Description ==
Widely considered to be the first written cookbook on Siamese cuisine, Mae Khrua Hua Pa includes the first recorded recipes for dishes including Massaman curry. The book also included recipes with cannabis.

In 2024, Thai food scholar Hanuman Aspler launched MKHP_as_is, a project to translate Mae Khrua Hua Pa into English for chefs.

The cookbook was first published as journal articles beginning in 1888, then finally published as a book in 1908.
