= Dylan Eitharong =

Thai-American chef

- ดีแลน อิทธะรงค์
- Born: October 3, 1991 (age 34)

Dylan Eitharong (Thai: ดีแลน อิทธะรงค์) is a Thai-American chef and owner of Haawm (Thai: หอม), a private Thai supper club in Bangkok, Thailand.

== Early life and education ==
Born in Florida, Eitharong operated Bangrak Thai Street Kitchen, a pop-up in Orlando. Named for Bang Rak District in Bangkok, the pop-up served street food like somtum and boat noodles.

== Career ==
=== Haawm ===
Haawm หอม

Restaurant information
- Established: 2019; 7 years ago
- Owner: Dylan Eitharong

Eitharong moved to Bangkok in 2019 and opened Haawm, described as “a speakeasy with reservations,” out of his aunt's house in Soi On Nut 25, serving seven course meals. Studying under Hanuman Aspler, Eitharong's menu is inspired by classical Thai cuisine and sources local ingredients. Haawm is a play on words, with its Thai transliteration meaning "smells good" and in English is a homophone for "home".
