= Chaophraya Surasakmontri =

Nobleman, businessman and military officer in Thailand

Field Marshal Chaophraya Surasakmontri PCh PCh PM
- เจ้าพระยาสุรศักดิ์มนตรี
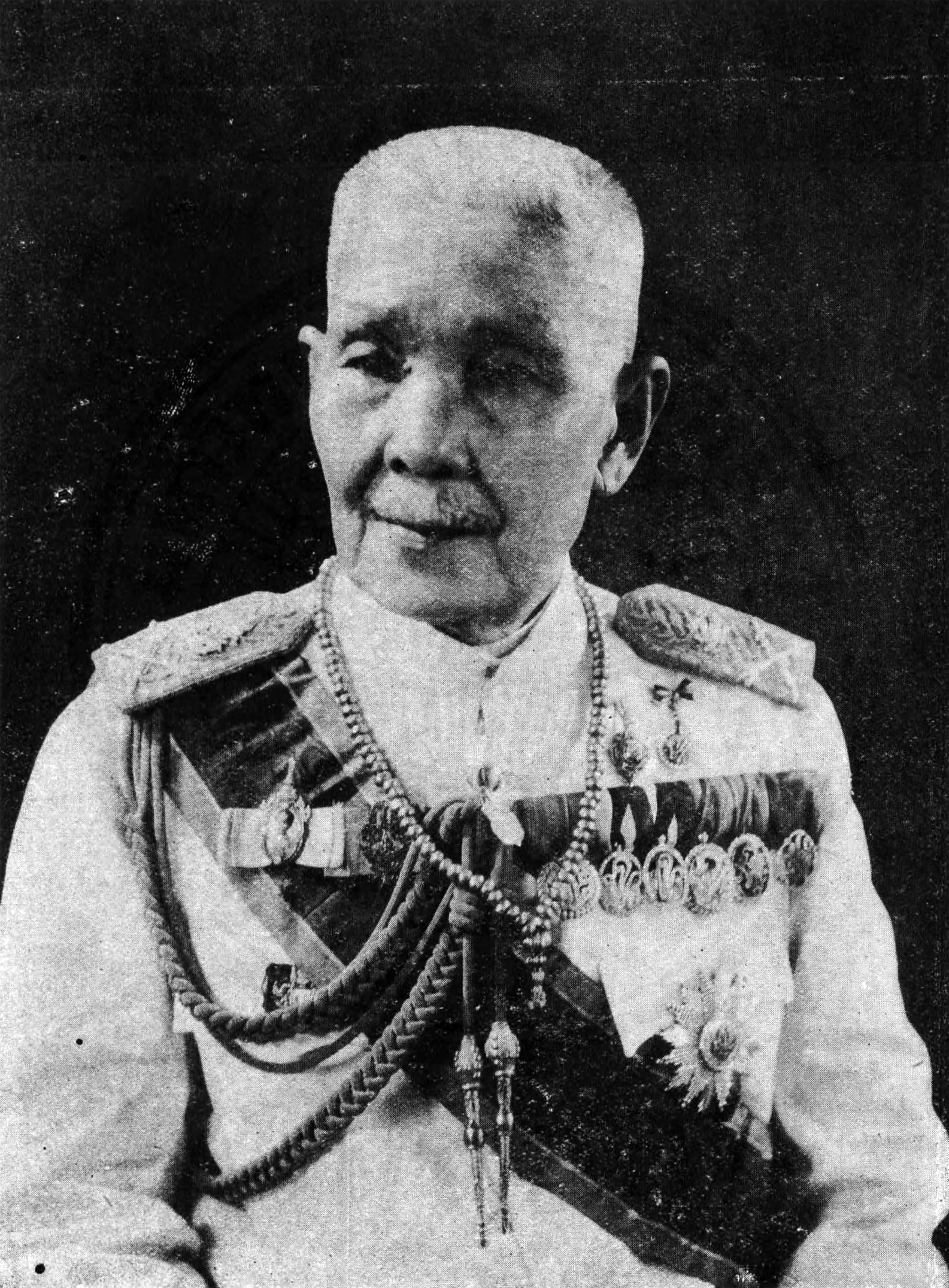
- Surasakmontri in 1928

Minister of Agriculture
- In office 1894–1899
- Preceded by: Chaophraya Phatsakorawong
- Succeeded by: Chaophraya Thewetwongwiwat

Chief of the Army Department
- In office 1890–1892
- Preceded by: Prince Damrong Rajanubhab
- Succeeded by: Prince Bhanurangsi Savangwongse

Personal details
- Born: Choem Saeng-Chuto; 28 March 1851 Bangkok, Siam
- Died: 1 July 1931 (aged 80) Bangkok, Siam
- Spouse(s): Rai Bunnag; Liam Bunnag
- Domestic partner(s): Phraya Surasak Montri, Bunnak
- Nickname: Jerm Sang-Chuto

Military service
- Allegiance: Thailand
- Branch/service: (Thailand) Royal Siamese Army
- Years of service: 1870 - 1892
- Rank: Field Marshal
- Commands: Commander of the Siamese forces
- Battles/wars: Haw wars, Ngiao rebellion

Chaophraya Surasakmontri (28 March 1851 – 1 July 1931), born as Choem Saeng-Chuto, was a Thai field marshal, nobleman, and businessman. He was best known in Haw wars campaign. He served as Commander of the Department of the Army from 1890 to 1892, and as Minister of Agriculture afterwards. He established a sawmill in Si Racha in 1900.

The city of Chaophraya Surasak in Chonburi is named after him.

== Biography ==
Chaophraya Surasakmontri was born in 1851 in Thonburi, Rattanakosin Kingdom, to his father Phraya Surasakmontri (Sang Chuto) and mother Doem Bunnak. He is the grandson of Phraya Surasena (Sawat Chuto).

As a child, he received education at Wat Phichai Yat until the age of 13.

In 1878, he was appointed as the chargé d'affaires to the British Empire to negotiate with the British consular general George Knox.

In 1900, Chaophraya Surasakmontri came to the area of the modern town and built a sawmill under his company Si Racha Capital Company Limited. In 1903, he requested that the district capital of Bang Phra district be moved to Si Racha, which it did.

In 1902, King Chulalongkorn gave orders to Chaophraya Surasakmontri to quell the Ngiao rebellion in Phrae province in northern Thailand against Siamese rule and centralization. He would reclaim rebel controlled land, with the leader of Phrae, Chao Phiriya Thepphawong, fleeing into Luang Phrabang.

Chaophraya Surasakmontri died on 1 July 1931. His funeral was held on 8 April 1931 at Wat Thepsirinthrawat.

== Honours ==
National honours

- 1895 - Knight Grand Cross of the Order of Chula Chom Klao
- 1901 - Knight Grand Cross of the Order of the White Elephant
- 1889 - Knight Grand Cross of the Order of the Crown of Thailand
- 1898 - Haw Campaign Medal
- 1906 - Dushdi Mala Medal Pin of Services to the Monarch (Military)
- 1906 - Dushdi Mala Medal Pin of Service to the Nation (Military)
- 1906 - Dushdi Mala Medal Pin of Acts of Bravery (Military)
- 1895 - Chakra Mala Medal
- 1899 - Chakrabarti Mala Medal
- 1926 - Saradul Mala Medal
- 1906 - King Mongkut's Royal Cypher Medal, 5th Class
- 1893 - King Chulalongkorn's Royal Cypher Medal, 1st Class
- 1922 - King Vajiravudh's Royal Cypher Medal, 1st Class
- 1927 - King Prajadhipok's Royal Cypher Medal, 2nd Class
- 1882 - Satabarsa Mala Medal
- 1883 - Rajadapisekmala Medal
- 1897 - Prapasmala Medal
- 1898 - Queen's Medal
- 1903 - Taweethapisek Medal
- 1897 - Ratchamongkol Medal
- 1908 - Rajamangala Bhisek Medal
- 1911 - King Rama VI Coronation Medal
- 1925 - King Rama VII Coronation Medal

Foreign Honours

- Grand Cross of the Order of Henry the Lion
- Order of the Red Eagle, 1st Class
- Commander of the Legion of Honour
- Knight of the Order of the Immaculate Conception of Vila Viçosa

Political offices
Preceded by Phatsakorawong	Minister of Agriculture; 1892–1896	Vacant Title next held by Theveswongwiwat
Military offices
Preceded by Damrong Rajanubhab as Grand-officer to the Army	Chief of the Army Department; 1890–1892	Succeeded by Bhanubandhu Vongsevoradej as Chief of the Joint Operations Department
