= Bee Satongun =

Thai chef and restaurateur

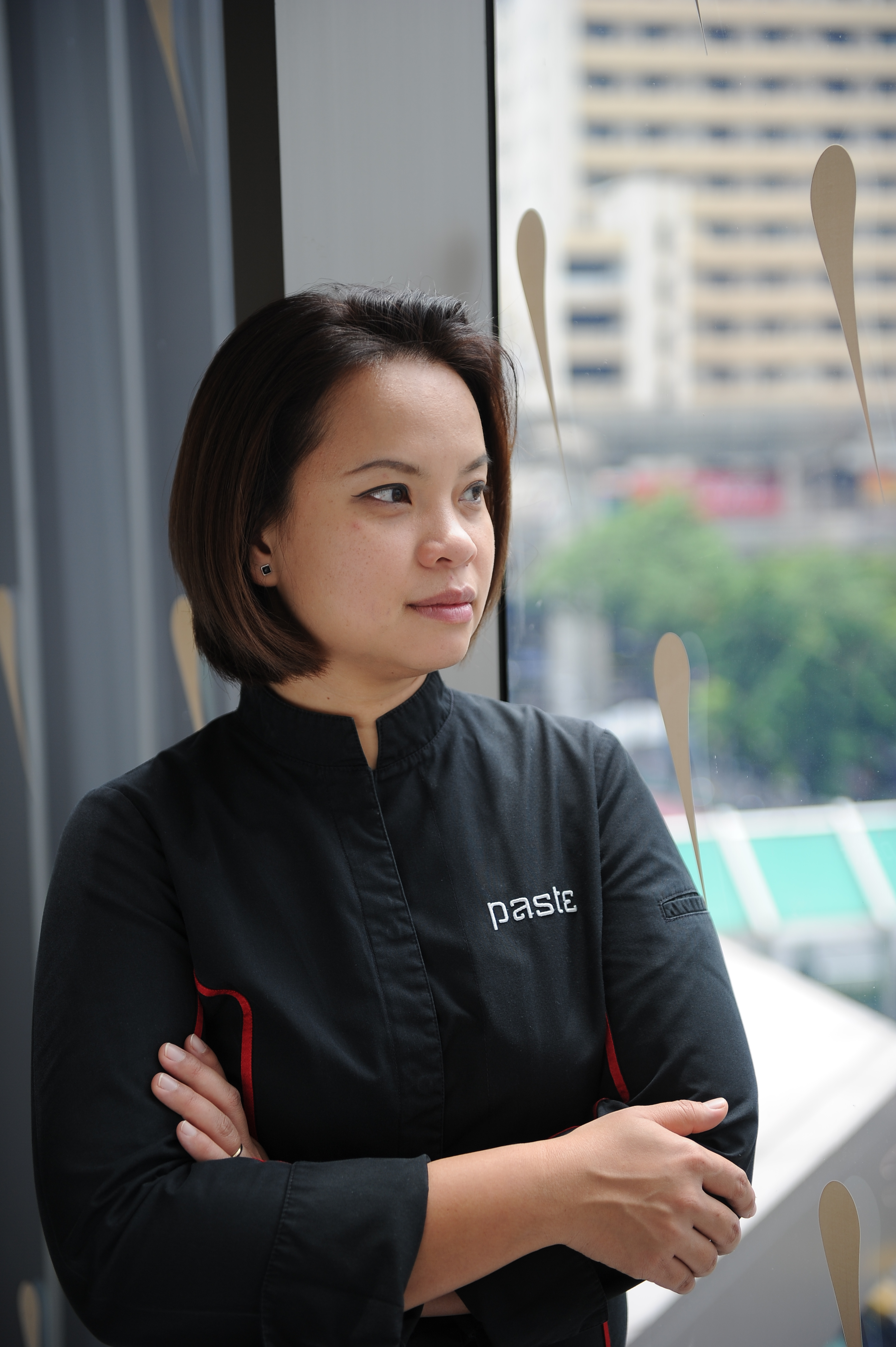
Chef Bee Satongun

Bongkoch "Bee" Satongun (Thai: บงกช "บี" สระทองอุ่น; born 1976) is a native Thai chef and restaurateur. She is known for her restaurant, Paste Bangkok, which received a Michelin star. Chef Bee has expanded the Paste brand to neighboring Laos and recently opened a third venue in Australia.

== Early life and career ==
Prior to the opening of Paste, Satongun spent years researching the history of Thai cuisine, re-creating ancient recipes and culinary techniques alongside chef, husband and business partner, Jason Bailey.

Both Satongun and Bailey had humble beginnings, from Satongun's childhood memories of pounding herbs with pestle on mortar to assist her mother's street food stall business in Bangkok, to Bailey's experiences growing up in the Southern Highlands of Australia. She met her husband on one of his earlier research trips to Thailand.

== Paste Bangkok ==
In 2012, Satongun and Bailey opened their first Paste restaurant in the neighborhood of Thonglor. In 2015, they opened a new iteration of Paste in Gaysorn shopping mall, located in Bangkok's Ratchaprasong district adjacent to the Intercontinental Hotel. At Paste, dishes represent regional Thai cuisine, taking inspiration from ancient Thai recipes and royal family cookbooks. Chef Bee hopes to do away with the notion of Thai food as 'cheap takeaway', and re-frame the cuisine in the minds of her diners.

In 2018, Paste Bangkok was awarded its first Michelin star in the inaugural Michelin Guide Bangkok. Paste Bangkok retained its one-Michelin-star rating in 2019. As of 2021, it retains its one Michelin star.

== Other restaurants and pursuits ==
In 2018, Satongun and Bailey opened their first overseas branch of Paste, Paste Laos at the Apsara in the town of Luang Prabang. Currently, Bailey is working on the development of Paste in Australia.

== Awards ==
- Winner of Most-Loved Thai Fine Dining Restaurant by Time Out, 2016
- 10 Best Michelin-rated Restaurants in Bangkok by The Guardian, 2017
- One Michelin star, Michelin Guide Bangkok, 2018, 2019, 2020, 2021
- Thailand Chef Ambassador by Gault & Millau Guide, 2018

== See also ==
- List of female chefs with Michelin stars
