= Chudaree Debhakam =

Thai chef (born c. 1993)

Chudaree "Chef Tam" Debhakam (born c. 1993) is a Thai chef from Bangkok. In 2024, she became the first Thai female chef to be awarded two Michelin stars. In 2025, she was named Asia’s Best Female Chef.

== Biography ==
As a child, Chudaree Debhakam aspired to become a professional athlete. After realizing that she did not have a future to become a professional sportsperson, Debhakam turned her attention to the culinary arts. Debhakam first moved to the United Kingdom to pursue a degree from the University of Nottingham in food science and nutrition. She later moved to the United States to train at the International Culinary Center in New York and to work under Dan Barber at Blue Hill at Stone Barns in Tarrytown.

=== Top Chef Thailand ===
While in New York, Debhakam's family encouraged her to apply for the first season of Top Chef Thailand. She returned to Thailand to appear on the show, where she was the youngest competitor at 24-years-old. In 2017, Debhakam won the first season of Top Chef Thailand.

=== Baan Tepa ===
In 2020, Debhakam opened Baan Tepa in a historic family home once owned by her grandmother. Baan Tepa specializes in traditional Thai cuisine. Produce for the restaurant are grown on the grounds of the estate. Debhakam's experience at Stone Barns inspired her vision for Baan Tepa, where regional produce is used, and sustainability is implemented through composting and recycling.

In late 2023, her restaurant Baan Tepa received its second Michelin star. With the award, Debhakam became the first Thai woman to receive two Michelin stars. That year, Baan Tepa received a green star from the Michelin guide recognizing the restaurant's sustainability practices. In 2024, Baan Tepa appeared 42 on Asia's 50 Best Restaurants list. She was also named the 2024 Michelin Guide Young Chef award.

=== Recognition ===
Debhakam has been widely recognized for her impact on Thai and Asian culinary scene. In 2025, Debhakam was named Asia's Best Female Chef by Asia's 50 Best Restaurants.

== See also ==
- List of female chefs with Michelin stars
