= Plian Phasakorawong =

Siamese noblewoman and chef

Than Phu Ying Plian Phasakorawong
- เปลี่ยน ภาสกรวงศ์
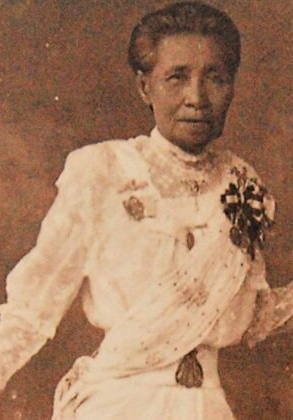
- Born: 8 December 1847
- Died: 11 December 1911 (aged 64)
- Spouse: Chaophraya Phatsakorawong (Porn Bunnag)

Than Phu Ying Plian Phatsakorawong (Thai: เปลี่ยน ภาสกรวงศ์, also spelled Plean Passakornrawong (Note: RTGS: Plian Phatsakorawong; other spellings include Phasakornwong, Phasakaravongse and Phassakorawongse.)) was a Siamese noblewoman and chef. In 1908, Plian wrote Mae Khrua Hua Pa, considered to be one of the oldest and most influential cookbooks on late 19th-century Siamese cuisine. The book included the first recorded recipe for massaman curry "Chicken Massaman curry with bitter orange juice".
