= Pichaya Soontornyanakij =

Thai chef

- Born: Pichaya Utharntharm; August 15, 1989 (age 36); Bangkok, Thailand
- Education: Chulalongkorn University (BA); Culinary Institute of America
- Occupations: Chef; Restaurateur
- Spouse: Boonpiti "Tor" Soontornyanakij

Pichaya Soontornyanakij (Thai: พิชญา สุนทรญาณกิจ, born Pichaya Utharntharm; Thai: พิชญา อุทารธรรม) is professionally known as Chef Pam, is a Thai chef, restaurateur, and television personality. She is best known for her work in contemporary Thai-Chinese cuisine and as the founder of the Michelin-starred POTONG in Bangkok, Thailand.

She was named The World’s Best Female Chef 2025 by The World’s 50 Best Restaurants, following her recognition as Asia’s Best Female Chef in 2024.

Chef Pam is the first Asian and Thai female chef to receive the World’s Best Female Chef award. She has received multiple accolades throughout her career, including one Michelin star for POTONG, the “Opening of the Year” award from the Michelin Guide, and the “3 Knives” status from The Best Chef Awards, a recognition unique among Thai female chefs.

== Early life and education ==
Pam Pichaya Utharntharm was born in Bangkok, Thailand, into a Thai-Chinese-Australian family, she is a fourth-generation descendant of a family that operated a traditional Chinese herbal medicine business in Bangkok’s Chinatown, her family heritage inspired the creation of POTONG, located in the former medicine house. In the 1880s, her family migrated to Thailand from Fujian southern China.

Born and raised in Bangkok, Pam attended Saint John's International School, and graduated from Chulalongkorn University in 2010 with a bachelor of arts in communication arts. Pam began her culinary journey at an early age, at 21 she won the Asia Youth Hope Cooking contest organized by Les Disciples d’Escoffier (2011), she was also named Young Woman of the Year by Her World magazine (2012) and was first runner-up in the Young Talent Escoffier global competition in the same year.

She later moved to the United States to study at the Culinary Institute of America (CIA), where she graduated with honors, earning first place in both culinary and management disciplines. Following her graduation, she trained at the three-Michelin-starred Jean-Georges in New York City under Executive Chef Mark Lapico.

== Career ==
After gaining international culinary experience, Pam Pichaya Soontornyanakij returned to Bangkok in 2015 to establish her first fine dining restaurant, The Table. Initially operated from her personal kitchen, the restaurant quickly garnered attention for its intimate dining concept and modern interpretation of Thai cuisine, The Table was named "Best New Restaurant" by Time Out and was later featured on The Great Big Story, a global storytelling platform produced in partnership with the Tourism Authority of Thailand.

In 2021, she opened Restaurant POTONG, a fine dining venue specializing in progressive Thai-Chinese cuisine. The restaurant is located in a restored 120-year-old Sino-Portuguese building that once housed her family’s herbal medicine business, “Potong” (普通). It earned her first Michelin Star. In addition to its Michelin recognition, POTONG was listed on The World’s 50 Best Restaurants (#13 in 2025) along with Highest New Entry award 2025 and Asia’s 50 Best Restaurants (#13 in 2025). It was also ranked #1 by TOP25 Bangkok Restaurants, one Diamond from the Black Pearl Guide.

== Television and Public Recognition ==
Chef Pam has become a prominent media figure in Asia, appearing on various culinary programs, she served as a host and judge on the Thai edition of Top Chef Judge. Chef Pam has also been featured as a judge on the Thai adaptation of Iron Chef Thailand, broadcast on Channel 7.

In addition, she appeared as a judge on Bid Coin Chef, a weekly cooking reality show broadcast on Channel 7 HD, which features chefs from across Thailand, including contestants from MasterChef Thailand, Top Chef Thailand, Hell's Kitchen Thailand Season 2, and Iron Chef Thailand.

Chef Pam has also contributed to culinary media and education platforms, she hosted a masterclass on Gronda, teaching “Six Ways to Use Asian Dried Ingredients.” On Netflix, she has been featured in Chefs Uncut, a documentary series exploring the lives and culinary journeys of six chefs from Southeast Asia, and in The Restaurant War Thailand, a competitive series highlighting Thailand’s top street food vendors under the mentorship of professional chefs. She also made her appearance as a guest judge on The World Cook, a global competitive cooking show featuring 16 chefs from around the world, and joined the judging panel of The Maverick Academy, a regional reality program for aspiring culinary professionals across Asia.

== See also ==
- List of female chefs with Michelin stars
