= Thitid Tassanakajohn =

Thai chef and restauranteur

- ธิติฏฐ์ ทัศนาขจร
- Born: Bangkok, Thailand
- Education: Faculty of Economics, Chulalongkorn University
- Occupations: Chef; Restaurateur
- Spouse: May Jirutta

Thitid "Ton" Tassanakajohn (Thai: ธิติฏฐ์ "ต้น" ทัศนาขจร) is a Thai chef and restaurateur. Thitid is the owner of Le Du, Nusara, and Baan restaurants in Bangkok, Thailand. In 2023, Le Du was ranked first on the Asia's 50 Best Restaurants list.

== Early life and education ==
Tassanakajohn was born in Bangkok, Thailand. He studied economics at Chulalongkorn University before pursuing a culinary career. He later attended the Culinary Institute of America in New York and trained in several restaurants in the United States, including establishments led by chef Jean-Georges Vongerichten, before returning to Thailand.

== Career ==
After returning to Thailand, Tassanakajohn founded Le Du in Bangkok in 2013. The restaurant focuses on modern Thai cuisine using seasonal Thai ingredients and local produce. He later expanded his restaurant portfolio with establishments including Nusara, Baan, and other concepts in Bangkok.

In 2023, Le Du became the first restaurant led by a Thai chef to be ranked No. 1 on Asia's 50 Best Restaurants list. His restaurant Nusara was also ranked No. 3 in the same year.

== Awards and recognition ==
- 2023 – Le Du was ranked No. 1 on Asia's 50 Best Restaurants.
- 2023 – Le Du received the dual distinction of The Best Restaurant in Asia and The Best Restaurant in Thailand from Asia's 50 Best Restaurants.
- Several restaurants operated by Tassanakajohn have been awarded Michelin stars and have appeared on Asia's 50 Best Restaurants rankings.
