= Suphamongkhon Supapipat =

Thai chef and restaurateur

- ศุภมงคล ศุภพิพัฒน์
- Born: 17 December 1976 (age 49)
- Occupations: Chef; Restaurateur

Suphamongkhon "Art" Supapipat (Thai: ศุภมงคล "อาร์ต" ศุภพิพัฒน์) is a Thai chef and restaurateur. Chef Art Suphamongkhon, owener of Chef's table by Chef Art and Banata. Chef Art used to be a member of the Thai national swimming team. He was awarded a scholarship to study at a high school in Florida, USA.

== Early life and education ==
Suphamongkhon Supapipat was born in Thailand in 1976. During his youth, he was a member of the Thailand national swimming team. He later received a scholarship to study at a high school in the U.S. state of Florida. After completing his studies, he developed an interest in culinary arts and pursued a career in the restaurant industry.

== Career ==
Supapipat began his culinary career after returning to Thailand from the United States. He became known as one of the pioneers of the chef's table dining concept in Thailand and established Chef's Table by Chef Art, an exclusive fine-dining restaurant in Bangkok. He later expanded his culinary ventures through additional restaurant concepts, including Banata.

In 2016, Bangkok Post described Supapipat as a Thai chef who returned from overseas experience to develop his culinary career in Thailand.

In 2025, Supapipat was appointed as the ninth Iron Chef of Thailand on the television cooking competition Iron Chef Thailand.
