= MasterChef Junior Thailand season 2 =

MasterChef Junior Thailand
- Season 2
- No. of episodes: 16

Release
- Original network: Channel 7
- Original release: 22 September – 22 December 2019

Season chronology
- ← Previous; Season 1

MasterChef Junior Thailand Season 2 is a reality cooking competition. It premiered on September 22, 2019, on Channel 7, accepting applications for contestants aged 8–13 years. M.L. Pasan Svastivatana, M.L. Kwantip Devakula and Pongtawat Chalermkittichai all returned as judges in this season. Piyathida Mittiraroch also returned as the host.

== Contestants ==
Contestant	Age	Hometown	Status	Number of Wins
Parima Sinhaphalin (Manta)	12	Bangkok	Winner on 22 December	5
Kheetakarn Pongsak (Kheeta)	12	Bangkok	Runners-up on 22 December	5
Veerawin Lertbunnapong (Vee)	9	Bangkok	Runners-up on 22 December	4
Kornrumpa Thirakajonwong (Nell)	9	Chiang Mai	Eliminated on 8 December	4
Rarakorn Sothorn (Fay)	9	Bangkok	Eliminated on 8 December	2
Jiratchaya Klongkitroj (Chubiee)	9	Bangkok	Eliminated on 8 December	2
Pordee Aunruan	11	Bangkok	Eliminated on 8 December	5
Yaninee Orrungroj (Chertam)	11	Bangkok	Eliminated on 1 December	1
Pakin Chalengsakdi (Ton)	9	Phuket	Eliminated on 1 December	1
Phunyapat Rojwongsuriya (Parman)	10	Bangkok	Eliminated on 1 December	3
Pilunya Chaengwattana (Runya)	8	Rayong	Eliminated on 24 November	1
Pasin Peerawaranupong (Fui)	12	Bangkok	Eliminated on 24 November	2
Praweerat Lekmek (Pream)	10	Pathum Thani	Eliminated on 17 November	4
Nutsakon Lervisit (Justin)	12	Nonthabuti	Eliminated on 17 November	3
Inrita Chokchai (Jinjin)	10	Bangkok	Eliminated on 10 November	2
Kenneth Rowley	10	Rayong	Eliminated on 10 November	4
Jidapa Milinthangkun (Aim)	11	Songkhla	Eliminated on 3 November	1
Phuree Chatchalermvith (Most)	12	Bangkok	Eliminated on 3 November	2
Krittapas Siripongpreda (Fiji)	8	Bangkok	Eliminated on 27 October	1
Phum Phanintorn Ungpongpanich (Makorn)	11	Bangkok	Eliminated on 27 October	3
Chanicha Leelassrisanga (Pat)	12	Bangkok	Eliminated on 20 October	1
Pakawat Pinkul (First)	11	Rayong	Eliminated on 20 October	1
Nutcha Sitthidamrong (Goh)	10	Bangkok	Eliminated on 13 October	0
Marisa Vejsupaporn (Risa)	12	Bangkok	Eliminated on 13 October	0
Sasicha Jirakobskul (Phoomjai)	8	Samut Prakan	Eliminated on 6 October	0
Phuwarisa Vanasantakun (Aprile)	12	Bangkok	Eliminated on 6 October	1
Suprawee Rattanamanochai (Fern)	10	Bangkok	Eliminated on 29 September	0
Tada Songkeaw (Satang)	10	Nakhon Si Thammarat	Eliminated on 29 September	0

== Elimination table ==
Place	Contestant	Episode																				
Place	Contestant	1	2		3		4	5		6	7		8	9		10		11		12		14
1	Manta	WIN	IMM	IMM	IN	IMM	WIN	IN	IMM	NPT	IN	WIN	PT	IN	IN	WIN	IMM	IN	PT	IN	IN	WINNER
2	Kheeta	IN	IMM	IMM	IN	IN	IN	IN	IMM	PT	WIN	IMM	WIN	WIN	IMM	IN	WIN	HIGH	PT	IN	LOW	RUNNERS-UP
2	Vee	HIGH	WIN	IMM	IN	IMM	PT	LOW	IN	PT	IN	WIN	WIN	IN	IN	IN	IN	IN	PT	IN	IN	RUNNERS-UP
4	Fay	IN	IMM	IMM	IN	IMM	PT	LOW	WIN	NPT	IN	IN	PT	IN	IN	IN	IN	IN	PT	LOW	ELIM	
4	Pordee	HIGH	IN	IN	IN	IMM	WIN	HIGH	IMM	PT	IN	IN	WIN	HIGH	WIN	IN	WIN	IN	PT	LOW	ELIM	
6	Chubiee	IN	WIN	IMM	IN	IN	PT	LOW	IN	NPT	IN	IN	PT	HIGH	IN	IN	IN	IN	PT	ELIM		
6	Nell	IN	IN	IN	IN	IMM	PT	HIGH	IMM	NPT	IN	IN	WIN	IN	IN	WIN	IMM	WIN	IMM	ELIM		
8	Ton	IN	IN	IN	IN	IMM	PT	LOW	WIN	NPT	HIGH	IN	PT	IN	IN	IN	LOW	LOW	ELIM			
8	Parman	IN	WIN	IMM	HIGH	IMM	PT	IN	IMM	NPT	IN	IN	WIN	IN	LOW	IN	IN	IN	ELIM			
10	Chertam	IN	IMM	IMM	IN	IN	IN	IN	IMM	NPT	IN	IN	PT	IN	IN	IN	IN	ELIM				
11	Runya	IN	IN	IN	HIGH	IMM	PT	LOW	IN	PT	IN	IN	PT	IN	IN	IN	ELIM					
11	Fui	IN	IN	IN	IN	IMM	PT	LOW	IN	NPT	IN	LOW	WIN	IN	IN	IN	ELIM					
13	Pream	IN	WIN	IMM	IN	IN	WIN	IN	IMM	PT	HIGH	IN	WIN	IN	ELIM							
13	Justin	IN	IN	IN	IN	IN	WIN	LOW	IN	PT	IN	IN	WIN	IN	ELIM							
15	Jinjin	IN	IN	IN	IN	IN	IN	IN	IMM	PT	IN	IN	ELIM									
15	Kenneth	IN	IN	WIN	WIN	IMM	WIN	LOW	IN	PT	IN	IN	ELIM									
17	Aim	HIGH	IMM	IMM	IN	IN	IN	IN	IMM	PT	IN	ELIM										
17	Most	IN	WIN	IMM	IN	IMM	LOW	LOW	LOW	LOW	IN	ELIM										
19	Fiji	IN	IN	IN	IN	IMM	PT	LOW	IN	ELIM												
19	Makorn	IN	IN	LOW	IN	IN	WIN	WIN	IMM	ELIM												
21	Pat	IN	IMM	IMM	IN	WIN	IN	LOW	ELIM													
21	First	IN	WIN	IMM	IN	IMM	IN	LOW	ELIM													
23	Goh	IN	IN	IN	IN	LOW	ELIM															
23	Risa	IN	IN	IN	IN	IN	ELIM															
25	Phoomjai	IN	IMM	IMM	IN	ELIM																
25	Aprile	IN	WIN	IMM	IN	ELIM																
27	Fern	IN	IN	ELIM																		
27	Satang	IN	IN	ELIM																		

(WINNER) This cook won the competition.
(RUNNER-UP) This cook finished in second place.
(WIN) The cook won an individual challenge (Mystery Box Challenge or Invention Test).
(WIN) The cook was on the winning team in the Team Challenge and directly advanced to the next round.
(HIGH) The cook was one of the top entries in an individual challenge, but didn't win.
(IN) The cook wasn't selected as a top or bottom entry in an individual challenge.
(IN) The cook wasn't selected as a top or bottom entry in a team challenge.
(IMM) The cook didn't have to compete in that round of the competition and was safe from elimination.
(PT) The cook was on the losing team in the Team Challenge and competed in the Pressure Test.
(NPT) The cook was on the losing team in the Team Challenge, did not compete in the Pressure Test, and advanced.
(LOW) The cook was one of the bottom entries in an individual challenge, but wasn't the last person to advance.
(LOW) The cook was one of the bottom entries in an individual challenge, and the last person to advance.
(LOW) The cook was one of the bottom entries in the Team Challenge and they were the only person from their team to advance
(LOW) The cook was eliminated but saved from elimination.
(WDR) The cook withdrew from competition.
(ELIM) The cook was eliminated from MasterChef.
