= Fairview March =

1983 gay rights protest in Ireland

The Fairview March was a large-scale protest of approximately 400 people on 19 March 1983 in outrage at the release of Declan Flynn's killers and in protest against violence towards Irish homosexuals. The Fairview March is widely considered Ireland’s first official Pride march, the birth of the Dublin Pride movement, and the largest homosexual protest held until that point in Ireland.

== Context ==
In the summer of 1982, Fairview Park became known as a popular cruising spot for gay men. By September 1983, a gang of queerbashers known as "the Rollers" patrolled the area regularly, and claimed to have rid 150 homosexuals from the park since summer 1982. A few of the gang claimed they had bashed “20 steamers” in the weeks leading up to September 10. These attacks were known to the Garda Síochána; representatives of the gay community had presented Gardaí with a dossier detailing descriptions and identities of those known to be involved, but this was not pursued.

The Fairview Park murder trial began on 1 March 1983, under Justice Sean Gannon. Kevin Higgins SC, for the 14-year-old's defence, told the jury this case was, "one of the saddest and most tragic that had ever come before the court. There would be no attempt on the part of the defence to justify queer bashing, whatever that was." Paul Carney SC defended Robert Alan Armstrong (aged 18) of Plunkett Drive, Finglas West. Patrick McEntee SC defended Anthony (Tony) Maher (aged 19) of Poplar Row Flats, Ballybough; Colm Donovan (aged 17) of Buckingham Street Lower; and Patrick Kavanagh (aged 18) of St Brigid's Avenue, North Strand.

Before retiring to reach a verdict, the jury were directed by Justice Gannon to find the 14-year-old not guilty of murder, by reason of insufficient evidence. Following three hours deliberation, the jury returned a verdict of guilty of manslaughter and specifically recommended that Justice Gannon be lenient in his sentencing. On 8 March 1983, Flynn's killers were delivered suspended sentences at the Central Criminal Court, Dublin.

== Response ==
Christopher Flynn's reaction following Justice Gannon's decision was recorded as, "They walked out of the court free, but my son cannot walk out of Glasnevin Cemetery." Flynn's colleague from Aer Rianta, Chris d'Arcy, said of the case, "To be honest, I lost faith in justice. Some priest and a GAA official talked up for some of the attackers, going on about their good characters. They shouldn't have done that."

In his own summing-up of the Declan Flynn trial, Justice Gannon stated, "They [the jury] gave a pretty clear indication, as representatives of the community, that the community was horrified at the crime and look on it as a very serious one. They indicated it was one which should merit severe punishment." However, Justice Gannon never commented publicly on this ruling, widely deemed controversial by the public.

The Dáil convened for an emergency debate on the Declan Flynn trial on 10 March 1983. It claimed widespread concern regarding the way laws passed by the Oireachtas were applied and perceived in court, particularly regarding the Criminal Law Amendment Act 1885. Newspapers headlined "Judiciary Go on Trial in Dáil" and reported that the judiciary were found guilty of "incomprehensible and bewildering inconsistencies".

Fianna Fáil TD Mary Harney challenged Minister for Justice Michael Noonan to seek Justice Gannon's resignation, stating, "We [the Dáil] must be seen to take action and you [Minister for Justice] must talk to the judge and let the people see you mean business." Workers' Party Leader Tomás MacGiolla, commented, "I could not believe the sentences when I heard them. I was very shocked. The victim in this case has suffered more as a result of the court case than the people responsible for the crime." Fianna Fáil spokesman on Justice, Michael Woods, contrasted the suspended sentence for manslaughter to a man who had been sentenced to 12 months in prison for stealing a purse and cash worth £20.36 earlier in the year, in order to clearly indicate the inconsistency in sentencing policy which is very hard to justify. David Norris said he was very concerned at the outcome of the case because it would appear to give a free hand to vigilante gangs out to intimidate gays saying: "It could be interpreted as a licence to kill".

The National Gay Federation released a statement on 9 March 1983 stating its sadness regarding the "incredibly lenient sentences". Its' official statement read: "While we appreciate the limitations of the Irish penal system, we are dismayed and annoyed at the obvious double standards employed in this case and we feel that the assailants would not have got off quite so easily if the particular sexual orientation of the victim had not been made an issue."

Speaking in a documentary about the murder, Éirénne Carroll, CEO of the Transgender Equality Network of Ireland, noted the similarities between the trial of Declan Flynn's killers and the Stonewall riots. "Both of them started because of oppression and violence towards gay, queer, people, and as we think about that in our society today, it is still an experience that a majority of our community faces, so moving forward we continue to mark the moments, and the history of Fairview and Stonewall as a reminder of the fight that we’ve had and the fight that needs to be done.”

== Fairview March ==
Following their release the night they were handed down their suspended sentences (9 March 1983), Flynn's killers were welcomed by friends and members of the community celebrating their release with a torchlight march to Fairview Park. One local woman told its reporter that there had been cheering when the news of the suspended sentences reached the neighbourhood. LGBT+ activists and allies reported that this "added to the prevailing despair of people who felt let down by justice and the impotence of politicians to act on the matter".

A protest march was organised on Saturday, 19 March 1983, when approximately 400 gay men, lesbians, and allies departed Liberty Hall and walked through the killers' neighbourhoods in a procession to Fairview Park. The Fairview March "outstripped" the official 1983 Dublin Pride Protest held later that year, and following Pride 1983 throughout the AIDS crisis, attendance did not reach this peak until following Norris v. Ireland. Organisation for the march was initially led by the Dublin Gay Collective, and were joined by representatives of the following groups in solidarity; the National Gay Federation, Liberation for Irish Lesbians, the Cork Gay Collective, Parents Enquiry, the Union of Students in Ireland, People's Democracy, Socialist Worker's Party, Sinn Féin, the Irish Republican Socialist Party, Democratic Socialists, and the Rape crisis centre. This allowed LGBT+ Irish individuals to participate with less fear of retribution, "meaning it was less identifiable for people to take part in". Banners and posters read messages including, "Parents of gays love their children" and "Stop violence against gays and women". One activist, photographed by Kieran Rose, held a placard reading, "Justice Gannon is an insult to law & order, Gannon - Out, Justice - In".

Brian Finnegan, editor of Gay Community News, noted, “The march for Declan Flynn took place 10 years later [than the first Pride protest in Ireland] and it was huge. People, not just from the gay community, marched against how the police and courts had handled the case.” Although not the first LGBT+ pride protest, it is regarded the catalyst to more frequent protests for LGBT+ rights, a yearly LGBT+ pride protest/parade, and wider LGBT+ rights, and shifted the average numbers at these protests from fewer than 100 people to approximately 400-500 people. Joni Crone, of Liberation for Irish Lesbians, recounted that Flynn's murder "sent shock waves through the community and also strengthened the bonds that exist between activists campaigning for gay rights, women's rights and worker's rights".

== Adaptations ==
Declan Flynn's murder and the Fairview March are the central topic of the documentary Remembering Declan Flynn and the Fairview March by Christelle Gebhardt. The episodic documentary series The Case I Can't Forget features an episode surrounding Flynn's murder (Episode 1, Season 3); The Killing of Declan Flynn.
