= Suzy Byrne =

Irish LGBT+ and disability rights activist

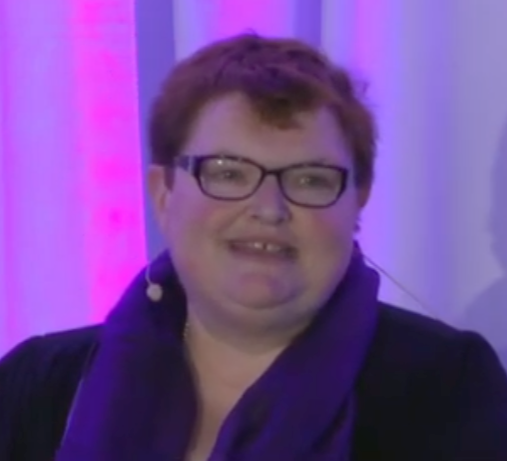
- Education: Trinity College Dublin
- Occupations: LGBT+ and disability rights activist, broadcaster and writer
- Employer(s): Greater Dublin Independent Living, National Advocacy Service for People with Disabilities, Iarnród Éireann, Irish Council for Civil Liberties
- Organization(s): Gay and Lesbian Equality Network; National LGBT Federation; International Lesbian and Gay Youth Organisation
- Notable work: Coming Out: Book for Lesbians and Gay Men of All Ages
- Political party: Labour Party (1991-2002)
- Website: http://www.mamanpoulet.com/ (blog)

Suzy Byrne is an Irish LGBT+ and disability rights activist, broadcaster, and writer. Byrne was a member of the Gay and Lesbian Equality Network (GLEN) and served as co-chair during the campaign to decriminalize homosexuality in Ireland, which succeeded in 1993. Byrne has been actively involved in organizations including the National LGBT Federation and the International Lesbian and Gay Youth Organisation. She also acted as spokesperson for the Campaign for Equality, a cross sectoral coalition of groups fighting for equal status legislation. Byrne co-authored Coming Out: Book for Lesbians and Gay Men of All Ages in 1994 and has contributed to publications such as Lesbian and Gay Visions of Ireland. Byrne has also worked with the National Advocacy Service for People with Disabilities and served on the board of Iarnród Éireann.

== Biography ==
In the early 1990’s, Byrne was a member of the Gay and Lesbian Equality Network (GLEN) and became co-chair of the organisation during the campaign for decriminalisation of homosexuality. She met with Irish politicians as part of GLEN lobbying delegations and attended protests with other activists until the successful change of legislation in the Irish Constitution in 1993. When the law changed decriminalising homosexuality, Byrne was featured on the front page of Issue 54 of the Irish magazine Gay Community News (GCN) celebrating outside Leinster House with activists Phil Moore, Chris Robson and Kieran Rose. The photograph was also published in The Irish Times.

In the late 1990s, Byrne studied a degree in Sociology and Social Policy as a mature student at Trinity College Dublin, where she researched sexual orientation, health and aging. As a student and activist, Byrne spoke to the Irish press about how "college authorities failed to prevent campus homophobia;" that "tutors, lecturers and teaching assistants need training in order to avoid discrimination;" the need for "non-judgemental" student counselling and pastoral care for the gay student community; that violence towards gay and lesbian people was under-reported; and how the current Irish law was "insufficient to prevent discrimination."

In 1993, she was one of the activists on the National Lesbian and Gay Federation Float at the annual St Patrick's Day Parade in Dublin and carried the GLEN banner with Feargus McGarvey at Dublin Pride. The image of Byrne with McGarvey has featured in the 2024 book Reeling in the Queers: Tales of Ireland's LGBTQ Past.

Byrne co-authored the book Coming Out: Book for Lesbians and Gay Men of All Ages with Irish LGBT+ activist and drag Queen Junior Larkin in 1994. Both Larkin and Byrne appeared on The Late Late Show television programme to speak about the book, after which Larkin was recognised and attacked. She also reported in the GCN on the petitions, protest vigils and even death threats made to The Late Late Show's presenter, Gay Byrne, after two former American nuns and lesbians, Rosemary Curb and Nancy Manahan were interviewed in 1985 to promote their book, Lesbian Nuns: Breaking Silence on the programme. In 2000, she contributed to the book Lesbian and Gay Visions of Ireland.

In 2005, Byrne began a blog, for which she has received awards at the Irish Blog Awards including Best News and Current Affairs Blog 2008, 2009 and 2010. She was founder of the Sapphic Ireland forum and discussing Irish politics and the campaign towards marriage equality on Twitter. She attended Sligo Lesbian Gay Bisexual and Transgendered Pride in 2007.

In 2014, Byrne contributed to the oral history book In the Name of Love: The Movement for Marriage Equality in Ireland by Una Mullally.

Byrne has been employed by organisations supporting individuals with disabilities, including the National Advocacy Service for People with Disabilities and Greater Dublin Independent Living. She has worked as a Director for Ireland's national railway operator Iarnród Éireann, working on ensuring that the rail services are accessible.

In 2017, Byrne announced the formation of the Disabled Women of Ireland (DWI), an organisation open to women, transgender and non-binary people with physical and intellectual disabilities, hearing and sight impairments and members of the Deaf community. At the inaugural meeting she commented about her hopes that the organisation would "bring forward new generations of leaders". Byrne has advocated for independent living for people with disabilities, has raised awareness of the harmful assumptions made about women with disabilities and how disabled women are hugely impacted by debates about abortion rights in Ireland.

In 2018, Byrne shared what journalists who have no direct personal experience of disability, racism or homophobia can do to improve how they frame their subjects and stories and how they can champion minority voices on the Our Man In Stockholm podcast.

In 2021, Byrne was interviewed by the LGBTQ+ education charity ShoutOut for their Know Your Queer History series. In 2023, Byrne participated in a "Fifty Years of Feminism" live podcast recording at Mansion House, Dublin, in celebration of International Women's Day and to commemorate the 50th anniversary of the National Women's Council of Ireland. She discussed the anxiety currently being felt in the lesbian, gay, transgender and non-binary community.

As of 2022, Byrne was a regional manager for the National Advocacy Service for People with Disabilities and chair of the Irish Council for Civil Liberties Board of Directors. She also chaired the International Lesbian and Gay Youth Organisation (IGLYO).

== See also ==
- LGBT rights in the Republic of Ireland
