= Outhouse LGBTQ+ Centre =

Community resource centre in Dublin

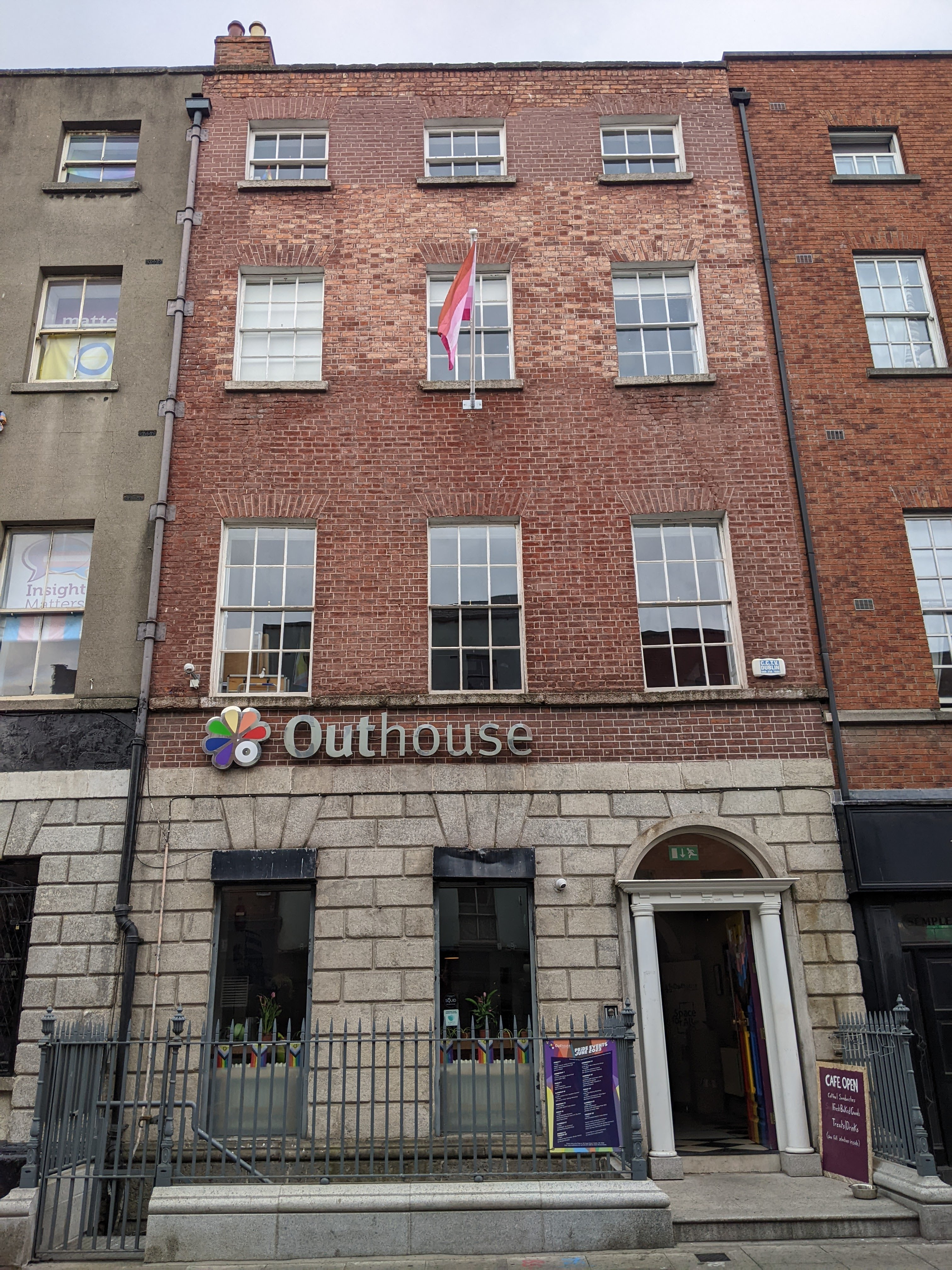
- Predecessor: The Hirschfeld Centre
- Formation: October 15, 1996; 29 years ago
- Type: NGO
- Registration no.: 255357
- Legal status: Company Limited by Guarantee not having Share Capital, with Charitable Status
- Headquarters: 105 Capel Street, Dublin 1, D01 R290
- Region served: Greater Dublin Metropolitan Area
- Services: Information and Referral, Rapid HIV Testing, Peer Support, Social Groups, Multi-purpose meeting rooms and offices, community cafe, social groups, campaigning, library, and theatre.
- Board chair: Seamus McManus
- CEO: Oisin O'Reilly
- Main organ: Board of trustees
- Affiliations: ILGA-Europe, ILGA, Trans Equality Together, Coalition 2030, Irish Network Against Racism, The Wheel, Charities Institute Ireland,
- Budget: €500,000
- Staff: 16
- Volunteers: 16
- Website: www.outhouse.ie
- Formerly called: Outhouse Community Resource Centre

Outhouse LGBTQ+ Centre is a community centre and café for LGBTQ+ people on Capel Street in Dublin, Ireland. It was preceded by the Hirschfeld Centre, the first gay and lesbian community centre in Ireland. It provides a range of services and facilities including HIV testing, a theatre, cafe and Ireland's only queer library. Outhouse's advocacy priorities are poverty, homelessness, and the safety of the LGBTQ+ community, and aims to develop a new advocacy casework support service. In 2016, 35,000 people visited the centre.

== History ==
Outhouse has its origins in an earlier Dublin-based community centre called the Hirschfeld Centre, which was established by the National LGBT Federation in Temple Bar. This centre was Ireland's first, full comprehensive LGBT community centre, named after the prominent German doctor and sexologist, Magnus Hirschfeld. On 4 November 1987, Hirschfeld Centre was destroyed by fire, which Senator Joe O'Toole claimed was arson, but it was presumed by the National LGBT Federation to be an accidental fire. As a result, Dublin was left without an LGBT community centre for the next decade.

=== 1996–2020 ===
Established in 1996, the Outhouse first operated from temporary rented premises on South William Street from June 1997. In 1998 the National Lesbian and Gay Federation and Gay Community News agreed on a settlement with Hirschfeld Enterprises Limited which operated the former Hirschfeld Centre, which ensured seed capital of €50,000 for the purchase of a suitable premises in which to open a new LGBTQ+ centre in Dublin. This enabled the purchase of 105 Capel Street, with Outhouse opening at the new premises in May 2001.

In 1997, Outhouse launched a website to provide information to members of the LGBTQ+ community across Ireland.

In 1999, president Mary McAleese made an official visit to Outhouse, which was heralded as "an indication of how Ireland as a nation has matured in the last decade".

In the early 2000s, Outhouse supported many activist groups and organisations including BeLonG To (2003) and Transgender Equality Network of Ireland (2006) to establish.

The economic crash of 2008 halted plans to redevelop 105 Capel Street and expand the centre. During the financial crisis, funding to Outhouse from the state was reduced by 25%.

Outhouse was active in helping to share the direction of the "Yes Equality" campaign for marriage equality in Ireland and from 2014 onwards was an active participant in the community platform meetings which helped to shape the messaging and structures of the campaign. During the marriage equality referendum campaign in 2015, Outhouse hosted a support service for canvassers, many of whom were LGBTQ+ people.

In 2020, with the onset of the COVID-19 pandemic, the centre was forced to close in line with public health measures. This had a negative effect on the centre's finances, resulting in artists organising a significant fundraising campaign entitled "Arthouse" to save the centre and keep it open.

=== Present ===
In late 2021, the long-standing chairperson of the board, George Robotham retired. The Centre partnered on the 2021 virtual Pride Parade. In April 2022, Oisin O'Reilly took over as chief executive officer of Outhouse. The Centre provided an alcohol-free space during Pride 2023 and hosted the Find Your Pride Pal buddy system for the festival. The Centre continued to host events including markets and exhibitions.

On 22 May 2023 Roderic O'Gorman, the Minister for Children, Equality, Disability, Integration and Youth, launched Outhouse's new strategic plan, Space for All. The plan envisages delivering universal accessibility to the ground floor and basement level of 105 Capel Street by the end of 2024. The strategy focuses on improving the quality of life for LGBTQ+ people by providing a space for community members to find, connection, community support, culture, and campaigns and makes commitments to intersectionality and equity. The plan commits to delivering universal accessibility to the ground floor and basement levels of 105 Capel Street by the end of 2024 and to developing a world-class LGBTQ+ centre for the city of Dublin.

=== Services and facilities ===
The library contains approximately 4000 books on LGBTQ+ topics and by LGBTQ+ authors from Ireland and abroad. The library hosts a regular book club. Outhouse provides or hosts a wide range of services to the LGBTQ+ community including an information, referral and signposting service, rapid HIV testing, peer support groups including a dedicated peer support group of LGBTQ+ asylum seekers and refugees as well as numerous social groups. The theatre hosts one resident acting group, called Acting Out, and also hosts various festivals including the International Dublin Gay Theatre Festival.

The centre provides a range of spaces and offices available for hire. Resident organisations include: Dublin Pride, Dublin Lesbian Line, ShoutOut, The Switchboard, Gay Health Network, Abortion Rights Campaign, and Sex Workers Alliance Ireland. The Outhouse also has a café.

== See also ==
- LGBT rights in the Republic of Ireland
