= Eddie McGuinness =

Irish LGBT+ activist

- Born: 1969 (age 56–57); Ireland
- Occupations: gay rights activist and event organiser

Eddie McGuinness (born 1969), also known as Mr Pride, is an Irish gay rights activist and event organiser. He was formerly director of the Dublin Pride Parade and co-founded The Outing Festival.

== Career ==
Eddie McGuinness is from Dundalk, and has lived in Dublin since the early 1990s. He took part in the first Dublin Pride parade after the decriminalisation of homosexuality in Ireland in 1993. From 2017 to 2023 he served as director of Dublin Pride.

In 1996, with Junior Larkin and John Pickering, McGuinness formed the first all-gay boyband 4Guys to rival Boyzone. Launched in Wonderbar in April 1996, the line up featured Ken Quinn, Keith Lee, John McGuirke, Mark Power, and Karl Anderson.

In 2019, he took part in a "kissing protest" at Leinster House to protest a homophobic attack on Brazilian man Danilo Matta. McGuinness recalled his recovery from a similar attack with a knife in 2002.

McGuinness organised and co-hosted of two virtual Dublin Pride celebrations in 2020 and 2021 during the COVID-19 pandemic. He was awarded the "Covid Hero" award for his community work during the pandemic by the Dublin Lord Mayor.

In 2013, McGuinness co-founded The Outing Festival, the world's only LGBT+ match making festival, in County Clare. He was part of the bid team involved in securing EuroPride for Limerick and Clare in 2028.

McGuinness was diagnosed with stage 3 throat cancer in 2020. He has since spoken about his treatment, and the importance of the HPV vaccine for men over the age of 26.

In 2024, McGuinness ran as a Labour Party candidate in the Local Elections in Dublin Bay South.
