= Irish Queer Archive =

LGBTQ archive in National Library of Ireland

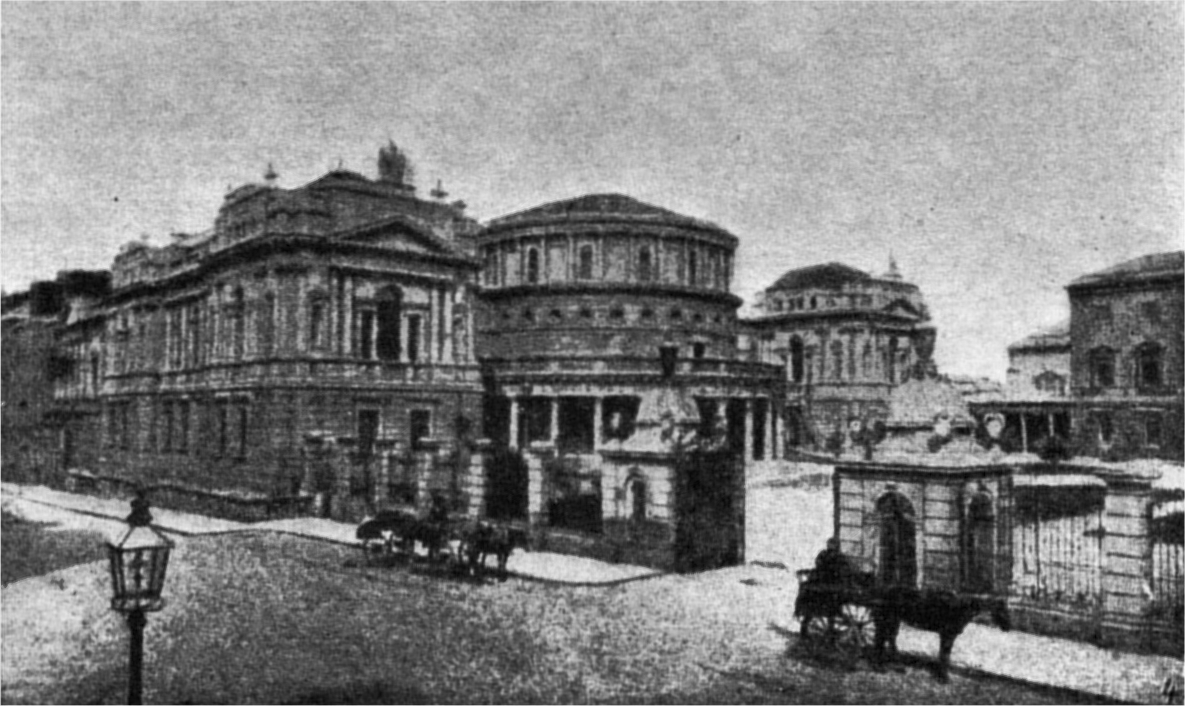

Irish Queer Archive (IQA) (Irish: Cartlann Aerach na hÉireann) is a comprehensive collection of material in Ireland relating to homosexuality, LGBT literature and general queer studies.

The Archive contains the most comprehensive collection of material in Ireland relating to homosexuality in particular and LGBT studies in general. There are some quarter-million press cuttings from the late 1960s onwards, a library of several hundred international titles (the earliest, a US title, dates from 1951), a complete set of every lesbian/gay title (periodicals and single issues) published since 1974 on the island of Ireland, and a collection of audiovisual material, photographs and slides, flyers, posters, badges and other ephemera. Among the private papers and organisational records are the archives of Alternative Miss Ireland, the Dublin Lesbian & Gay Film Festival GAZE, National LGBT Federation, Irish Gay Rights Movement, Gay Health Action, GLEN, Lesbians Organising Together, Dublin LGBTQ+ Pride Festival, and Gay Community News.

The Irish Queer Archive was presented in 2008 to the National Library of Ireland (NLI) following a decision to donate it by the National LGBT Federation. IQA is a living archive and continues to accept donations and deposits. As of June 2026, the IQA collection in the NLI consisted of 87 boxes of archival material.

== Background ==
Post the Stonewall riots of 1969, Irish lesbian and gay groups and individual activists have laboured to document their history. Well-preserved yet incomplete records bear witness to the nascent lesbian and gay civil rights era of the early 1970s. Organisations like the Northern Irish Gay Rights Association, Irish Gay Rights Movement and the National LGBT Federation (NXF) maintained a tradition of preservation with keen foresight, often at considerable expense and with limited human resources.

As one of the largest, oldest and continuous lesbian/gay corporate organisations in Ireland, NXF has been to the forefront of maintaining some semblance of an archive. From the late 1970s onwards this was confined to a rudimentary press clippings service and some limited research by, amongst others, activists Edmund Lynch, David Norris and Tom McClean. Like many organisations, NXF also managed to acquire or subsume the interests and records of other smaller, often more specialised, groups. One example of this is the entire archive of Out, Ireland's first commercial monthly gay magazine (1984–1988). The Out holding typically includes proofed manuscripts, original artwork, administrative and financial files, photographs, illustrations and file copies.

From 1980 onwards a larger group of people in NXF helped maintain and preserve documents and cuttings. NXF capitalised on years of acquisition by holding onto a huge number of international titles that were surplus to ILGA’s requirements when the International Lesbian and Gay Association (ILGA) moved its information secretariat from Dublin to Stockholm in 1982. This collection constitutes the bedrock of the archive's library of international titles dating back to 1951.

The archive and reference library was put on a more organised footing in Midsummer 1997 when NXF and Gay Community News moved into new premises on South William Street, Dublin. At that point, civil rights activist Tonie Walsh, along with librarians Linda Forry and Plunkett Conroy, began a systematic re-organisation of its holdings. A limited public office was set up in a short time, facilitating researchers, students and historians, in addition to servicing the research needs of journalists at Gay Community News.

Although it struggled financially in the following years with finding suitable, affordable office and storage accommodation, NXF lost no time in appointing a group of academics, historians and writers to focus on exploiting the collections and making suggestions for a future safe home. This IQA group consisted of Eibhear Walshe, lecturer in English at University College Cork; Mary McAuliffe and Katherine O’Donnell, both of Gender Studies at University College Dublin; Susan O'Brien, Joan Murphy, an Raidió Teilifís Éireann archivist; librarian Elizabeth Kirwan of National Library of Ireland; and Tonie Walsh, coincidentally a former president of NXF and founding editor of Gay Community News.

In 2002, a campaign called Friends of the Irish Queer Archive was launched by Labour Party deputy leader Liz McManus in Dublin. The campaign sought to raise funds to find a permanent home for archive material on gays and lesbians in Ireland. In 2004, the archive moved into its new home in Dun Laoghaire.

Extensive overtures and negotiations with Gerry Lyne (since retired) of the Department of Manuscripts at the National Library of Ireland (NLI) ultimately bore fruit when it was agreed in 2008 to transfer the collections to NLI. The historic transfer of IQA to NLI was also hugely symbolic as it signalled the Irish state taking ownership of LGBT heritage. However, given the size of the archive, much work needs to be done in the filing, cataloguing and ultimately digitising of the entire collection. IQA holdings that have been made accessible are described as Manuscripts Collection List No. 151.

An advisory group, composed of many of the above-mentioned individuals, continues to focus on opportunities to help the National Library of Ireland exploit its collection.
