= Junior Larkin =

Irish LGBT+ activist, author and drag queen

- Born: Ireland
- Died: July 2017; Ireland
- Other name: Kylie O'Reilly
- Occupations: gay rights activist and drag queen

Junior Larkin (died July 2017), also known by his stage name Kylie O'Reilly, was an Irish drag queen and gay rights activist.

== Career ==
Larkin came out and became involved in gay activism in 1993. Speaking at the reaction to the Gay and Lesbian Conference in 1994, Larkin said that he had been attacked four times in one year due to his sexuality.

Larkin was one of the staff of Gay Community News in the early 1990s, overseeing the layout and design of the magazine. He acted as mentor to the future editor of GCN, Brian Finnegan. Larkin was involved in the Dublin Lesbian and Gay Youth Group. With this group, he hosted the annual talent show with Anthony McGrath, called Search For A Star. The winner of the competition would be featured on a cover of GCN. He was also involved in the International Gay and Lesbian Youth Organisation.

In 1994 he co-wrote the book Coming Out: A Book For Lesbians and Gay Men of All Ages with the editor of GCN, Suzy Byrne. Both Larkin and Byrne appeared on The Late, Late Show to speak about the book. Larkin's appearance on the show led to him being recognised and attacked by a group of men near his flat on the Botanic Road. After Larkin left GCN he set up a free gay magazine, Guyz, as a glossy magazine but it was not successful due to the difficulty in securing sponsors.

Larkin was part of the 1995 information campaign by Out Youth, which sought to counter the rise in homophobic attacks in Dublin in the 1990s.

With John Pickering and Eddie McGuinness, Larkin formed the first all-gay boyband in 1996, 4Guys, which Larkin wanted to rival Boyzone. Launched in Wonderbar in April 1996, the line up featured Ken Quinn, Keith Lee, John McGuirke, Mark Power, and Karl Anderson. In 1996, Larkin was the subject of the radio documentary, By George, made by Kevin Reynolds for RTÉ Radio 1.

== Drag act ==
As Kylie O'Reilly, Larkin was one of the most famous drag queens in Dublin in the 1990s. He hosted nights at a number of Dublin gay bars, including The George. Larkin chose the name Kylie as he was a fan of Kylie Minogue. After the decriminalisation of homosexuality in Ireland in 1993, Larkin dressed as a pregnant Kylie O'Reilly in a wedding dress for Dublin Pride, and at the steps of Central Bank on Dame Street she threw her bouquet into the crowd. Kylie performed with a group called Kylie's Kreatures with fellow drag queens, Maisie Minogue (later known as Phyllis Lautner), Barb Minogue, and Emaciated Minogue at The Temple of Sound.

As Kylie, Larkin wrote, performed and submitted the song Delicious Boyz (Lick Me I’m Delicious) to the Irish National Song Contest for Eurovision.

== Later life ==
Larkin retired from the gay scene in the late 1990s. Larkin died in July 2017.
