= Michael Barron (advocate) =

Irish social justice advocate, author and researcher

- Born: County Kilkenny, Ireland
- Occupations: Social justice advocate, author, researcher
- Known for: LGBTQ+ youth rights advocacy; equality policy and youth work
- Notable work: How Ireland’s LGBTQ+ Youth Movement Was Built (2025)

Michael Barron is an Irish social-justice advocate, author and researcher. He co-founded BeLonG To LGBTQ+ Youth Ireland and has worked in youth policy and education. His book How Ireland’s LGBTQ+ Youth Movement Was Built was published in 2025 by Policy Press and was covered by The Irish Times and RTÉ Culture.

== Early and personal life ==
Barron grew up in County Kilkenny and began youth and community work in the 1990s. He later completed a doctorate in social science at Maynooth University. Barron is queer and lives with his husband, activist and artist Jaime Nanci.

== Career and activism ==
=== BeLonG To LGBTQ+ Youth Ireland ===
In 2003 Barron co-founded BeLonG To, a national organisation for LGBTQ+ young people, and served as an early executive director. With young people, he helped develop campaigns including “So Gay!” (2004), Making Schools Safe (2006, with the Equality Authority), and Stand Up! Support Your LGBT Friends (launched 2010).

During the 2015 referendum on same-sex marriage (the Thirty-fourth Amendment), BeLonG To led the BeLonG To YES coalition of children's and youth organisations. According to BeLonG To Youth Services, Barron directed the campaign, and contemporary coverage quoted him speaking at the RDS count centre. The coalition included Barnardos, ISPCC, Foróige, the National Youth Council of Ireland and Youth Work Ireland.

Barron and BeLonG To also engaged with national anti-bullying policy. He took part in the Department of Education's anti-bullying working group in 2012 to develop what the Government subsequently issued as the Action Plan on Bullying (January 2013) and Anti-Bullying Procedures for Primary and Post-Primary Schools (September 2013).

=== EQUATE – Equality in Education ===
After BeLonG To, Barron led EQUATE – Equality in Education, an advocacy initiative on school admissions and inclusion. EQUATE argued for ending the “baptism barrier”, under which oversubscribed denominational primary schools could prioritise baptised children in admissions. Commentary in 2018 also addressed the significance of removing the barrier. In 2018 the Government commenced provisions of the Education (Admission to Schools) Act 2018, removing religion as a selection criterion for most denominational primary schools for the 2019/2020 admissions cycle (the “baptism barrier”).

=== Other philanthropy and policy work ===
Barron also served as executive director of the Rowan Trust, a grant-making body supporting social-justice projects.

He has contributed to international policy discussions on youth participation and non-discrimination, including collaboration with UNESCO and publication with the Council of Europe.

== Publications ==
In 2025, Barron published How Ireland’s LGBTQ+ Youth Movement Was Built: Civil Society in Pursuit of Social Justice. It was released by Policy Press. In a review for the Irish Independent, Tonie Walsh described the book as "extraordinary", stating that Barron's "latest critical undertaking couldn't have arrived at a more critical time".

== Archive ==
In 2024, the National Library of Ireland acquired the 'Michael Barron Papers'.

== Honours and recognition ==
- Person of the Year, GALAS Awards (2013).
- Harvey Milk Human Rights Medal (2013).
