= Gay Community News =

Gay Community News may refer to:

- Gay Community News (Boston)
- Gay Community News (Dublin)
