= LGBTQ rights in the Republic of Ireland =

LGBTQ rights in Ireland
- Location of Ireland (dark green) – in Europe (light green & dark grey) – in the European Union (light green) – [Legend]
- Legal status: Legal since 1993, with an equal age of consent
- Gender identity: Transgender people can change legal gender by self-declaration since 2015
- Military: Allowed to serve openly
- Discrimination protections: Sexual orientation protections (see below)

Family rights
- Recognition of relationships: Same-sex marriage since 2015
- Adoption: Full adoption rights since 2017

Lesbian, gay, bisexual, transgender, and queer (LGBTQ) rights in the Republic of Ireland are regarded as some of the most progressive in Europe and the world. Ireland is notable for its transformation from a country holding conservative attitudes toward LGBTQ issues, in part due to the opposition by the Catholic Church, where sexual activity between men was criminalised until 1993, to one holding overwhelmingly liberal views in the space of a generation. In May 2015, Ireland became the first country to legalise same-sex marriage on a national level by popular vote. The New York Times declared that the result put Ireland at the "vanguard of social change". Since July 2015, transgender people in Ireland can self-declare their gender for the purpose of updating passports, driving licences, obtaining new birth certificates, and getting married. Same-sex sexual activity was decriminalised in 1993, and most forms of discrimination based on sexual orientation are now outlawed. Ireland also forbids incitement to hatred based on sexual orientation. Article 41 of the Constitution of Ireland explicitly protects the right to marriage irrespective of sex.

In June 2017, Leo Varadkar, who came out as gay in 2015, was appointed as Ireland's Taoiseach, and thus became the fourth openly gay head of government in the world.

== Legality of same-sex sexual activity ==
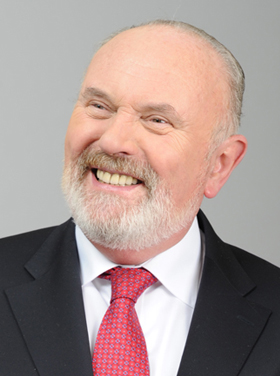
David Norris

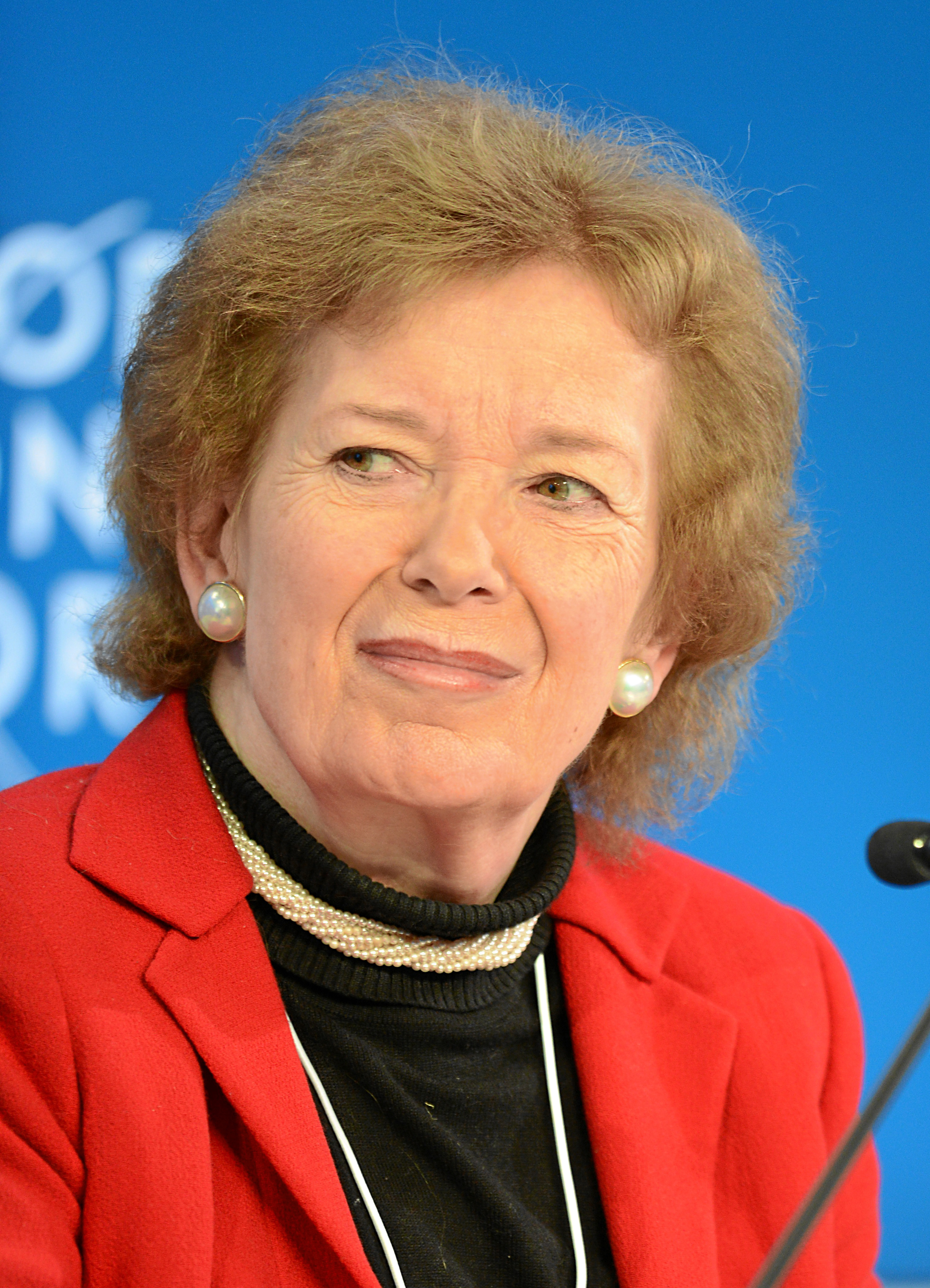
Mary Robinson

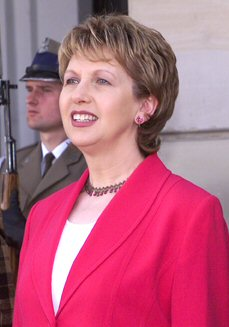
Mary McAleese

Norris, Robinson and McAleese were major early LGBT rights campaigners in Ireland.

Prior to 1993, sexual activity between men was criminalised under the Offences Against the Person Act 1861, and the Criminal Law Amendment Act 1885. Both statutes had been enacted by the Parliament of the United Kingdom before Irish independence, and had been repealed in England and Wales in 1967, in Scotland in 1980, and in Northern Ireland in 1982. The Campaign for Homosexual Law Reform was founded in the 1970s by Trinity College Dublin lecturer David Norris and its members included Mary McAleese and Mary Robinson, both later future presidents of Ireland.

In 1983, David Norris challenged the constitutionality of these laws in a case before the High Court but was unsuccessful. On appeal, Supreme Court in Norris v. Attorney General upheld the decision of the High Court in a 3–2 majority. The judgment of Chief Justice Tom O'Higgins referred to the "Christian nature of [the Irish] State" and argued that criminalisation served public health and the institution of marriage.

In 1988, Norris made an application to the European Court of Human Rights, arguing that Irish law was incompatible with the European Convention on Human Rights. In Norris v. Ireland, the court ruled that the criminalisation of male homosexuality in Ireland violated Article 8 of the Convention, which guarantees the right to privacy in personal affairs. Male homosexual relations were decriminalised under the Criminal Law (Sexual Offences) Act 1993, when the Minister for Justice, Maire Geoghegan-Quinn, in the 1993–1994 Fianna Fáil–Labour coalition government included decriminalisation with an equal age of consent (an equal age of consent was not required by the ECHR ruling). None of the parties represented in the Oireachtas opposed decriminalisation. The bill was signed by the President of Ireland, Mary Robinson, who as senior counsel had represented Norris in his Supreme Court and European Court of Human Rights challenges.

=== Apologies ===
On 19 June 2018, as a result of a Labour Party motion proposed by Ged Nash, Taoiseach Leo Varadkar, himself gay, issued a public apology to members of the LGBT community for the suffering and discrimination they faced from the Irish state prior to the legalisation of homosexuality in 1993. Speaking to the Oireachtas, he said:

Today the people I want to pay a special tribute to are the unknown heroes, the thousands of people whose names we do not know, who were criminalised by our forebears... What we can say is that we have learned as a society from their suffering. Their stories have helped change us for the better; they have made us more tolerant, more understanding and more human.

Justice Minister Charles Flanagan also issued an apology to members of the LGBT community who suffered as a result of the criminalisation of homosexuality, saying:

I extend a sincere apology to all of those people, to their family, and to their friends. To any person who felt the hurt and isolation created by those laws, and particularly to those who were criminally convicted by the existence of such laws.

== Recognition of same-sex relationships ==
Same-sex marriage is legal in Ireland, following approval on 22 May 2015 of Thirty-fourth Amendment of the Constitution of Irelandin a referendum, providing that marriage is recognised in the Constitution of Ireland irrespective of the sex of the partners. In the referendum, 62% of voters supported same-sex marriage.

=== Civil partnerships ===
A 2008 survey showed that 84% of Irish people supported civil marriage or civil partnerships for same-sex couples, with 58% supporting full marriage rights in registry offices. The number who believed same-sex couples should only be allowed to have civil partnerships fell from 33% to 26%.

A civil partnership bill was presented to the cabinet on 24 June 2009 and was published on 26 June. Although most LGBT advocacy groups cautiously welcomed the legislation, there had been criticisms of the proposal. One major criticism stated that the legislation effectively enshrined discrimination in law insofar as separate contractual arrangements with greater privileges continued to exist for opposite-sex marriages concurrent to lesser arrangements for those wishing to take out civil partnerships. In particular, the denial of the right to apply to adopt to couples with a civil partnership was cited as particularly discriminatory.

In July 2010, the Oireachtas passed the Civil Partnership and Certain Rights and Obligations of Cohabitants Act 2010, recognising civil partnerships between same-sex couples. The bill passed all stages in the Dáil, without a vote, and by a margin of 48 votes to 4 in the Seanad. The bill was supported by all parties, although individual politicians criticised the legislation. The bill passed all stages in Dáil Éireann on 1 July 2010 with cross-party support resulting in it passing without a vote, and passed by a margin of 48 votes to 4 in the Seanad on 9 July 2010. It granted same-sex couples several rights then only granted to married couples, but did not recognise children raised by same-sex couples as being their children. Irish law only allowed gay people to adopt children as individuals, while allowing same-sex couples to jointly foster. It also granted cohabitants, both gay and straight, who have lived together for at least five years limited rights in an opt-out scheme where a former partner could apply to court on the breakdown of a relationship to make the other former partner provide financial support to him/her. The bill was signed into law by President Mary McAleese on 19 July, enacted as the Civil Partnership and Certain Rights and Obligations of Cohabitants Act 2010. The bill was signed by President Mary McAleese on 19 July 2010. The act came into force on 1 January 2011. Due to the three-month waiting period for all civil ceremonies in Ireland, it had been expected that the first civil partnership ceremonies would take place in April. However, the legislation does provide a mechanism for exemptions to be sought through the courts, and the first partnership, which was between two men, was registered on 7 February 2011. The first publicly celebrated Irish civil partnership under the Act took place in Dublin on 5 April 2011. Since the civil partnership legislation has been fully enacted and implemented from the start of 2011, gay and lesbian couples have been able to register their relationship before a registrar.

The ability to enter into a civil partnership ended on 16 November 2015.

=== Marriage ===
A March 2011 The Sunday Times poll showed support for full civil marriage rights at 73%.

The new Fine Gael–Labour government agreed to establish a Constitutional Convention to consider same-sex marriage among other things. On 2 July 2013, the Constitutional Convention delivered the formal report to the Oireachtas, which had four months to respond.

A 2013 survey showed that 73% of Irish people agreed that "same-sex marriage should be allowed in the Constitution".

On 5 November 2013, it announced that a referendum to allow same-sex marriage would be held in the first half of 2015. On 19 February 2015, Taoiseach Enda Kenny announced that the marriage equality referendum would take place on Friday 22 May 2015. Fine Gael, the Labour Party, Fianna Fáil, Sinn Féin, the Socialist Party, and the Green Party all supported the right of marriage for same-sex couples. In 2015, a survey of 1,000 individuals in Ireland found that 78% of people supported same-sex marriage and 71% of people thought that same-sex couples should be allowed to adopt.

The referendum passed by a majority of 62.7% and added the wording "Marriage may be contracted in accordance with law by two persons without distinction as to their sex" to the Constitution.

The measure was signed into law by President Michael D. Higgins as the Thirty-fourth Amendment of the Constitution of Ireland on 29 August 2015. The Marriage Act 2015, passed by the Oireachtas on 22 October 2015 and signed into law by the Presidential Commission on 29 October 2015, gave legislative effect to the amendment.

Same-sex marriage became legally recognised in Ireland on 16 November 2015 and the first marriage ceremonies of same-sex couples occurred on 17 November 2015.

== Parenting ==
On 6 April 2015, the Children and Family Relationships Act 2015 was signed into law, amending (among other acts) the Adoption Act 2010, and on 19 July 2017 the Adoption (Amendment) Act 2017 was signed into law. These laws amended Irish adoption law to enable same-sex couples to adopt children.

Irish adoption law allows for applications to adopt children by married couples, cohabiting couples or single applicants. The legalisation of same-sex marriage in Ireland, in conjunction with the passage of the Children and Family Relationships Act 2015 and the Adoption (Amendment) Act 2017 means that same-sex couples are in law permitted to adopt.

A single gay person or one partner of a couple may apply and a same-sex couple may submit a joint application to foster children. Additionally, lesbian couples have access to IVF and assisted insemination treatment. In January 2014, Minister for Justice and Equality Alan Shatter announced that the Government of Ireland would bring in laws by the end of the year to extend guardianship, custody, and access rights to the non-biological parents of children in same-sex relationships and children born through surrogacy and sperm and egg donation.

On 21 January 2015, the government announced that a revised draft would give cohabiting couples and those in civil partnerships full adoption rights. The bill was set to become law before the May same-sex marriage referendum. The bill was published on 19 February 2015, ratified by both houses of the Oireachtas by 30 March 2015 and was signed into law on 6 April 2015, becoming the Children and Family Relationships Act 2015. Key provisions of the Act (including spouses, stepparents, civil partners and cohabiting partners being able to apply to become guardians of a child) went into effect on 18 January 2016.

On 5 May 2016, James Reilly, Minister for Children and Youth Affairs, announced that the Irish Government had approved the publication of a new adoption bill. The bill would amend the Adoption Act 2010 and the Children and Family Relationships Act 2015 and give legislative effect to the Thirty-first Amendment of the Constitution of Ireland (the children referendum). The purposes of the bill are to allow children to be adopted by their foster carers, where they have cared for the child for at least 18 months, and to allow two people regardless of marital status to adopt children, thus granting married same-sex couples the right to adopt. The bill also allows for the adoption of a child by civil partners and cohabiting couples and gives children a greater say in the adoption process, among many other reforms to the adoption system. The bill passed the Dáil on 30 November 2016, and received approval by the Seanad on 13 June 2017. The bill was signed into law by President Michael D. Higgins on 19 July 2017, becoming the Adoption (Amendment) Act 2017. The commencement order was signed by the Minister for Children and Youth Affairs, Katherine Zappone, on 18 October and the law went into effect the following day.

In January 2019, the Minister for Employment Affairs and Social Protection, Regina Doherty, announced that the government had published a bill that would amend the Civil Registration Act 2004 and allow lesbian couples who have had donor-assisted children in an Irish fertility clinic to register as their parents. Under the changes, parents may choose the labels "mother" and "father" or instead the term "parents", meaning that the non-biological mother would be able to legally register as a co-parent. It passed the Daíl in March 2019, and the Seanad in May 2019. The Civil Registration Act 2019 was signed into law by President Michael D. Higgins on 23 May 2019. It came into effect immediately. This legislation does not apply to Irish lesbian couples who have had donor-assisted children abroad or who have used reciprocal IVF (where one mother gives the eggs and the other mother carries the pregnancy; the non-birth mother is actually the biological mother). In these two cases, the couple must generally complete an adoption process. LGBT activist Ranae von Meding has two daughters with her wife Audrey through reciprocal IVF. She has been lobbying for legislation which would recognise all families regardless of how or where the child was conceived. Von Meding has started a petition on Uplift.ie which as of early September 2019 had received over 22,000 signatures in support. The Irish Independent reported in November 2019 that a fertility clinic in Dublin was offering reciprocal IVF services to lesbian couples.

In March 2021, a female same-sex couple from County Cork was the first to be recognised as parents on their own child's birth certificate in Ireland under the Children and Family Relationships Act 2015.

In June 2024 the Assisted Human Reproduction Bill passed through the final stages of the Dáil. The advocacy group Irish Gay Dads gave a mixed response, with the group's Chairperson Séamus Kearney Martone telling Newstalk Radio that the legislation is incomplete. "A lot of our families will be protected by this," he said, but while many families will receive a declaration of parentage, "a lot of them won't — if I think about couples living abroad."

== Discrimination protections ==
Discrimination on the basis of sexual orientation is outlawed by the Employment Equality Act 1998 and the Equal Status Act 2000. These laws forbid discrimination in any of the following areas: employment, vocational training, advertising, collective agreements, the provision of goods and services, and other publicly available opportunities. Additionally, while gender identity is not explicitly included in these two acts, it has been interpreted as being covered under the category of sex and disability.

Some protections provided remain uneven. As pointed out at page 26 in "Review, the Journal of the Public Service Executive Union, July/August 2014", Section 81E (5) of the Pensions Act 1990 prevents pensioners who retired more than one year before the 2010 civil partnership law from challenging the refusal of a survivor's pension for their civil partner.

The Labour Minister for Public Expenditure and Reform, Brendan Howlin, told the Dáil that he will not allow, for example, a gay man, who opted not to give a (meaningless) pension benefit to his wife in 1984, the right to opt to give a pension benefit to his husband in 2015 the first opportunity he could have done so. This would remain the case even if the gay man paid the same pension contributions as his heterosexual colleague. This decision was condemned in a leading article and opinion piece in the Irish Examiner on 24 June 2015 as being contrary to the spirit of the marriage referendum but remained government policy.

The Prohibition of Incitement to Hatred Act 1989 outlawed incitement to hatred based on sexual orientation. The penalties for violating this law are a fine not exceeding €1,000 or imprisonment for a term not exceeding 6 months or both on the first offense, or on conviction on indictment, a fine not exceeding €10,000 or imprisonment for a term not exceeding 2 years or both. The Act defines the term "hatred" as follows:

"hatred" means hatred against a group of persons in the State or elsewhere on account of their race, colour, nationality, religion, ethnic or national origins, membership of the travelling community or sexual orientation

In October 2022, the Irish Cabinet in government formally signed off on protecting transgender individuals from hate crimes within Ireland - by explicitly including "gender identity" to the list which sexual orientation is already explicitly included since 1989.

On 3 June 2015, the cabinet debated an amendment to the Employment Equality Act 1998. The amendment would remove the provision in the Act allowing religious-run schools to dismiss teachers and staff on the sole basis of their sexual orientation and/or gender identity. On 11 July 2015, the bill passed the lower house, and on 9 August 2015 it passed the upper house. On 16 August 2015, the Irish President signed the bill into law, and the legislation went into effect immediately.

== Hate crime laws ==
The Criminal Justice (Hate Offences) Act 2024 implemented board-based hate crime laws that explicitly included "sexual orientation, gender identity and sex characteristics". Ireland has implemented the “toughest and broadest legislation within Europe” in force since 31 December 2024 on hate crimes. It explicitly covers sex, sexual orientation, sex characteristics, race, nationality, religious beliefs and affiliations, disability, ethnicity and gender identity.

== Military service ==
Lesbian, gay and bisexual people can serve openly in the Irish Defence Forces. Discrimination on the basis of sexual orientation is illegal.

There has been no preclusion since 1993 when male homosexuality was decriminalised in the Republic of Ireland. Since 1993, there has been significant change to make sure that there was no discrimination in terms of public policy. At the same time as an equal age of consent was introduced for heterosexual and homosexual persons, the Irish Defence Forces announced that they would be treating heterosexual and homosexual members equally. Relationships between senior and junior ranks would continue to be forbidden, as is common in most militaries. There would also be no harassment of gay officers and no questioning of members about their sexuality. The Irish Independent wrote in 1993 that:

In a related development, the Chief of Staff of the Irish Defence Forces, Lieutenant General Noel Bergin, told the Irish Independent on Tuesday that a report on the introduction of a code of conduct governing interpersonal relationships is being prepared. The decision to prepare a report follows a recent announcement by the Minister for Defence, David Andrews, that military regulations would be modified to take account of any reform in the civil law on homosexuality. Andrews is seen as a member of the liberal wing of the Fianna Fáil party. Lt. Gen Bergin pointed out that the Army does not ask potential recruits about their sexual orientation, and that they had few problems in the past in this area.

Information regarding sexual orientation is not sought from personnel wishing to enlist in the Defence Forces. The Defence Forces have a code on interpersonal relationships and guidelines in relation to discrimination.

== Transgender rights ==
The Irish courts first dealt with the case of same-sex marriage in the case of Foy v. An t-Ard Chláraitheoir. In that case, Dr Lydia Foy, a transgender woman, sought a finding that she was born female but suffered from a congenital disability and claimed that the existing legal regime infringed her constitutional rights to marry a man. In support of her claim, she relied on case law from the ECHR. Judge McKechnie noted that in Ireland it was crucial that parties to a marriage be of the opposite biological sex. The judge noted that Article 12 of the ECHR is equally predicated. Accordingly, he found that there was no sustainable basis for the applicant's submission that the law which prohibited her from marrying a party of the same biological sex as herself was a violation of her constitutional right to marry. The judge concluded that the right to marry is not absolute and has to be evaluated in the context of several other rights including the rights of society. Therefore, the state is entitled to hold the view which is espoused and evident from its laws.

The Supreme Court returned Foy's case to the High Court in 2005 to consider the issues in light of the Goodwin v United Kingdom decision of the ECHR. Foy had also issued new proceedings in 2006 relying on a new ECHR Act, which gave greater effect to the European Convention on Human Rights in Irish law. The two cases were consolidated and were heard in April 2007. Foy stressed the Goodwin decision where the European Court of Human Rights had found that the UK had breached the rights of a transgender woman, including her right to marry. McKechnie J was very reproachful of the government in his judgment and asserted that, because there is no express provision in the Civil Registration Act, which was enacted after the Goodwin decision, it must be questioned as to whether the State deliberately refrained from adopting any remedial measures to address the ongoing problems. He emphasised that Ireland is very much isolated within the member states of the Council of Europe with regards to these matters. The judge concluded that by reason of the absence of any provision which would enable the acquired identity of Foy to be legally recognised in this jurisdiction, the state is in breach of its positive obligations under Article 8 of the Convention. He issued a declaration that Irish law was incompatible with the ECHR and added that he would have found a breach of Foy's right to marry as well if it had been relevant.

On 19 October 2007, Dr. Lydia Foy won her case in the High Court which ruled that the failure to allow her to obtain a new birth certificate recording her gender as female was in breach of her rights under the ECHR. The government appealed this decision but dropped its appeal in June 2010 and stated it would introduce legislation in the future. A new government took office in February 2011 and following the report of an advisory committee in July 2011, the Minister responsible announced that the government would introduce gender recognition legislation as soon as possible. No legislation had been introduced by February 2013 and Foy commenced new legal proceedings seeking to enforce the decision made by the High Court in 2007. In June 2014, a gender recognition bill was announced and in September 2014, the government stated that it would be published by the end of the year. The bill was introduced on 19 December 2014. On 15 July 2015, the Gender Recognition Act 2015 with major amendments passed both houses of the Oireachtas and President Michael D. Higgins signed the bill into law on 22 July 2015. The law allows legal gender changes without the requirement of medical intervention or assessment by the state. Such change is possible through self-determination for any person aged 18 or over, resident in Ireland and registered on Irish registers. The law came into effect on 8 September 2015.

On 29 November 2019, Minister for Employment Affairs and Social Protection Regina Doherty published a report on reviewing the 2015 gender recognition law, including recommendations to make legal gender recognition available to 16- and 17-year-olds on the basis of self-declaration with parental consent.

In April 2019, Glitter Hole's Drag Storytime event was cancelled by Dún Laoghaire–Rathdown County Council, initially claiming it was "not age-appropriate", and later claiming it was due to the high level of homophobic abuse on social media.

In August 2022, the Irish Rugby Football Union announced a ban on transgender women competing in contact rugby. Transgender men are still allowed to compete if they sign a "written consent". In a statement, the IRFU said transgender women had "options to remain active in the game, such as non-contact playing formats (tag/touch rugby), refereeing, coaching, and volunteering, underlining that the IRFU values their on-going involvement in the game." The move was condemned by several LGBT organisations.

In November 2022, charity network Transgender Europe found that wait times for access to a first appointment for gender affirming healthcare in Ireland ranged from 2.5 years to 10 years. It further found that Ireland had only one public trans health provider, which was severely understaffed, and that patients seeking care there were reportedly denied for reasons including being on social welfare, having a diagnosis of ADHD, or not answering a series of "highly sexualized questions" in "the right way", leading many Irish trans people to turn to alternative methods of securing healthcare including the private sector and self-administering hormone therapy. Advocacy group Trans and Intersex Pride Dublin's response was to advocate for an informed consent model of healthcare access, saying "Trans people should be empowered to make decisions about their transition themselves".

== Conversion therapy ==
In March 2018, Senator Fintan Warfield (Sinn Féin) introduced a bill to Seanad Éireann to ban conversion therapy on LGBT people. Under the proposed bill, individuals found guilty of performing conversion therapies could be fined up to 10,000 euros and face up to a year in prison. The bill does not ban practices that provide assistance, acceptance and understanding to LGBT youth or people otherwise questioning their sexuality. The legislation has received the support of the Irish Council of Psychotherapy and many politicians and lawmakers. Some politicians further described conversion therapy as the gay equivalent of female genital mutilation.

The bill passed its second reading in Seanad Éireann on 2 May 2018. It lapsed with the dissolution of Dáil Éireann and Seanad Éireann in 2020, but was later restored in September of that year. As of April 2022, it remains stalled in the Seanad.

The Fianna Fáil–Fine Gael–Green coalition formed after the 2020 Irish general election pledged in its Programme for Government to introduce a ban on conversion therapy. Research commissioned on potential legislation is due to be published sometime in 2022.

== Sex education ==
The current sex education classes in Ireland have been described by many students and teachers as "archaic", "inadequate" and "biased", as well as "largely religious based", with reports of non-virgin students being humiliated, and LGBT issues never mentioned. In April 2018, the Dáil Éireann approved the Provision of Objective Sex Education Bill 2018, in its second reading, that would modify Ireland's sex education classes. The new classes would cover issues such as consent, the use of contraceptives, abortion, LGBT issues and sexuality. However, the legislation lapsed with the dissolution of the Oireachtas in 2020.

== Health and blood donation ==
In January 2017, the Irish Blood Transfusion Service (IBTS) replaced a lifetime ban on donations from males who have had anal or oral sex with another male with a 12-month ban. This followed intense campaigning on the issue by activists over a number of years, including a judicial review challenge to the policy in the Irish High Court.

On 27 July 2015, Tomás Heneghan, a 23-year-old University of Limerick student and journalist from Galway began a legal challenge in the High Court against the permanent deferral imposed on MSM (men who have sex with men) donors. He argued that the questionnaire and interview process used by the IBTS did not adequately assess the risk of disease transmission posed by his donation. He claimed this was in breach of EU law. He said that both failed to consider the length of time between a donor's last sexual experience and the end of a "window period" in which infections are sometimes not detected. Heneghan's previous sexual activity posed no risk of infection, according to HSE-approved advice and he said the service had no evidence upon which it could legitimately impose a lifelong ban on him donating blood.

Following several adjournments of the case to allow the blood service and the Department of Health to examine and develop the donation policies, in late June 2016 the IBTS recommended that the lifetime ban on MSM be reduced to a 12-month ban. Later that week, Minister for Health Simon Harris agreed to the recommendations and announced the reduction would take place. However, no timeline was initially reported for the implementation of the new policies.

On 26 July 2016, Heneghan dropped his challenge against the service as an end to the lifetime deferral on MSM blood donors had been announced in the interim. Heneghan wrote about his experiences of challenging the ban in a number of national media outlets. He appeared on TV3's Ireland AM show to speak about his case.

On 2 October 2016, it was reported that Harris would implement the new policy from 16 January 2017, almost seven months after he announced the policy change. On 16 January 2017, Heneghan attended a blood donation clinic in D'Olier Street, Dublin and became the first man who has had sex with another man to donate blood openly in the Republic of Ireland since the lifetime deferral policy was first introduced in the 1980s. However, he also criticised the new 12-month deferral policy on MSM and called on the Health Minister to initiate a review of the IBTS and replace the 12-month deferral period for MSM with no deferral or a 3-month deferral on all donors following sexual intercourse.

Previously, in August 2013, Heneghan had alleged that the IBTS had discriminated against him despite his assertion that he had never had oral or anal sex with another man.

On 20 May 2019, Heneghan initiated a fresh legal challenge in the High Court against the blanket deferral on men who have had oral or anal sex with another man in the previous 12-month period. Heneghan argued that the questionnaire did not enable the IBTS to make a full evaluation of the level of risk presented by an individual donor due to their sexual behaviour. He also stated that according to the IBTS's own website, there was a window period following infection during which HIV and hepatitis may not be detected in the blood and that this window is seven days for HIV and 16 days for hepatitis. He claims that a far less onerous restriction could be imposed rather than the 12-month deferral, which would protect blood recipients. He claims the decision to place an "automatic deferral" on him was unlawful and in breach of EU law and European communities regulations on the quality and safety of human blood products and that the policy was disproportionate, discriminated against homosexual and bisexual men, and breached his constitutional rights and rights under the European Convention on Human Rights.

On 28 March 2022, the deferral period was reduced further to 4 months. From 28 November 2022, an individual risk assessment system has been in operation, resulting in blood donations from all prospective blood donors, regardless of orientation or gender, being accepted on the condition they have not engaged in anal sex with a new partner, or multiple partners, in the previous 4 months.

=== PrEP programme ===
In November 2019, the Department of Health established a PrEP programme, called a "gamechanger" by campaigners. Under the regulations, those who attend an approved service and are found to be at substantial risk of HIV and meet the clinical eligibility criteria will be eligible for PrEP free of charge, dispensed through community pharmacies. PrEP can significantly reduce the risk of infection among HIV-negative people at high risk.

== Living conditions ==
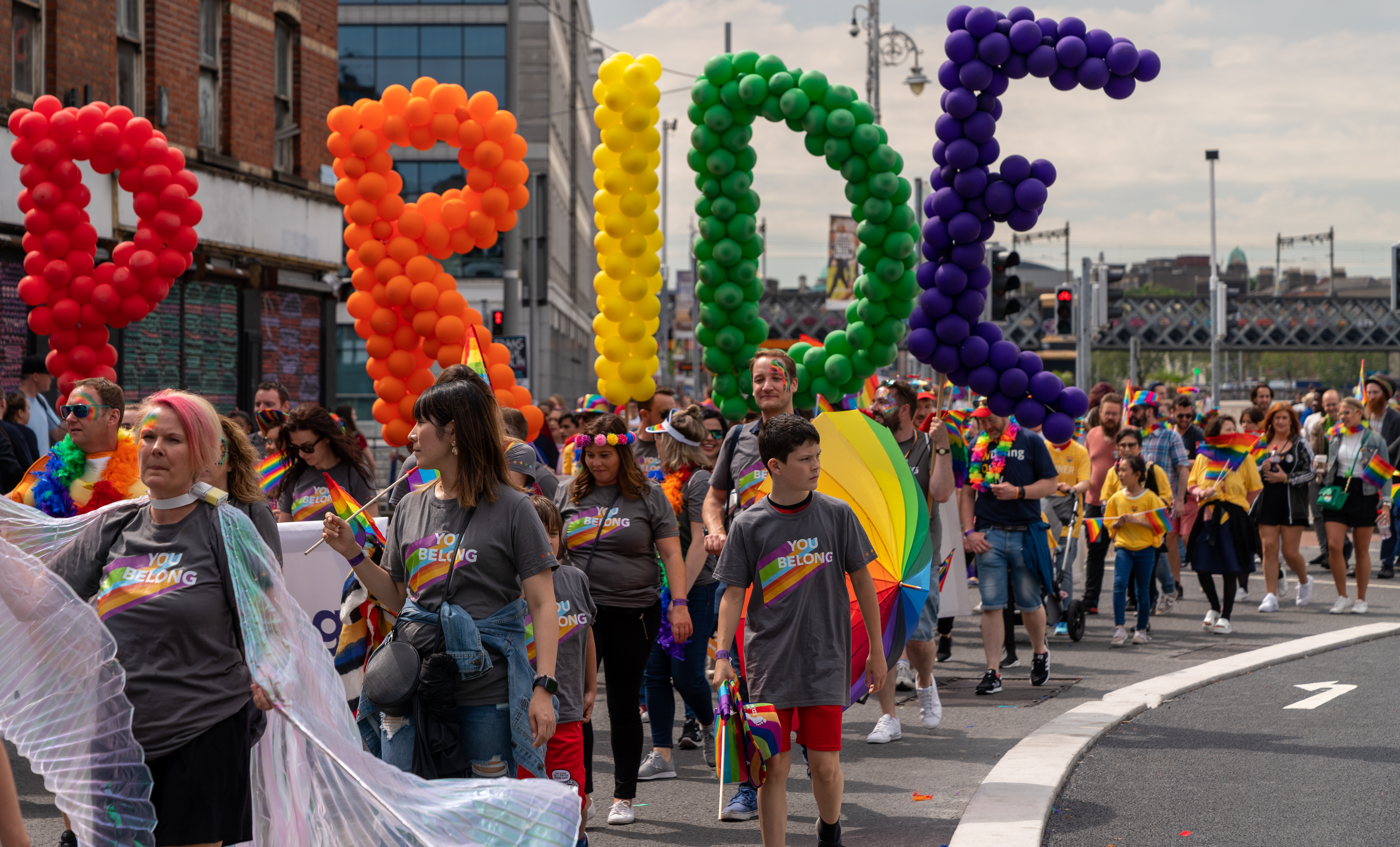
Dublin Pride 2019

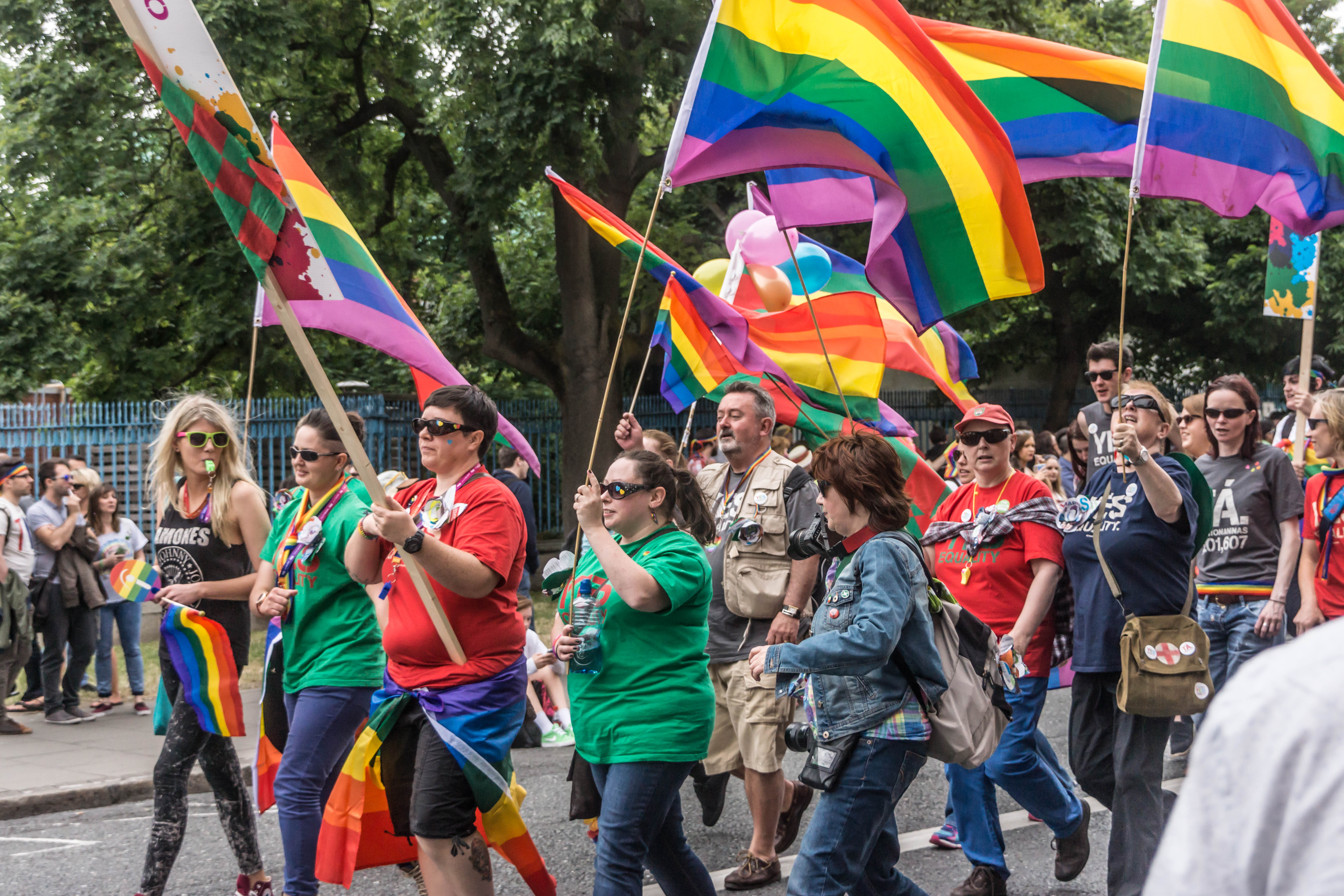
Participants at the 2015 Dublin Pride parade

Ireland is notable for its quick and drastic change in attitudes and public perception toward LGBT people, homosexuality and same-sex relationships. Up until the 1970s, the climate for LGBT people was one of high homophobia and public antipathy (and to an extent, this is still the case in certain contexts today, as many LGBT youth still experience bullying). LGBT individuals would mostly either stay in the closet, move to England, or commit suicide. In the 1970s, small LGBT groups began to emerge and organise politically. Among them was the Campaign for Homosexual Law Reform, founded by David Norris. The killing of Declan Flynn, a thirty-year-old gay man, on 10 September 1982 led to Ireland's first LGBT public march, held in Dublin's Fairview Park, the scene of the crime. Over the following years, LGBT groups and activists began to slowly enter the public eye and raise awareness of their cause and movement. In 1993, Ireland officially decriminalised homosexuality, celebrated as a landmark victory by LGBT groups, which had filed suit up to the European Court of Human Rights to strike down the ban. By the early 2000s, societal attitudes were becoming increasingly more accepting. Anti-discrimination laws covering sexual orientation were enacted, civil partnerships were legalised in 2011, granting same-sex couples several legal rights, and transgender transition laws were relaxed, allowing transgender people the right to change their legal gender on official documents. In May 2015, in a historic vote, the Irish people voted to legalise same-sex marriage, becoming the first country in the world to legalise it through a public vote. Societal change towards the LGBT community has been attributed to, among others, a decline in Catholicism in Ireland, which was previously "omnipotent" and played a big influence in both public and private life.

Opinion polls have shown raising levels of support for LGBT rights and same-sex marriage. According to a 2012 poll, 73% of Irish people agreed that same-sex marriage should be legalised. The 2015 Eurobarometer found that 80% of Irish people supported same-sex marriage. 15% were opposed.

Numerous LGBT events and venues can be found throughout Ireland. Dublin Pride is an annual pride parade held on the last Saturday of June in the capital city of Dublin. It is Ireland's largest public LGBT event. In 2018, an estimated 60,000 people attended. Other events include the Dublin Gay Theatre Festival, the GAZE International LGBT Film Festival Dublin and Mr Gay Ireland. Outside of Dublin, there are also visible, albeit smaller, LGBT scenes in Cork, Galway, Limerick, and Waterford. There are various gay or gay-friendly pubs, restaurants, clubs, bars and saunas all over Ireland.

The 2019 Eurobarometer showed that 83% of Irish people believed gay and bisexual people should enjoy the same rights as heterosexual people, and 79% supported same-sex marriage.

The 2023 Eurobarometer found that 86% of Irish thought same-sex marriage should be allowed throughout Europe, and 83% agreed that "there is nothing wrong in a sexual relationship between two persons of the same sex".

== Summary table ==
Same-sex sexual activity legal	Yes (Since 1993)
Equal age of consent (17)	Yes (Since 1993)
Anti-discrimination laws in employment only (Expansion: including schools and hospitals run by the religious orders)	Yes (Since 1998) Yes (Since 2015)
Anti-discrimination laws in the provision of goods and services	Yes (Since 2000)
Anti-discrimination laws in all other areas (incl. indirect discrimination, hate speech)	Yes (Since 1989)
Anti-discrimination laws concerning gender identity	Yes (Covered under "sex")
Hate crime laws that explicitly includes sexual orientation, gender and sex characteristics	Yes (Since 2024)
Hate speech law includes special orientation	Yes (Since 1989)
Hate speech law includes gender identity	Yes (Since 2022)
Recognition of same-sex couples (e.g. civil partnership)	Yes (Since 2011)
Same-sex marriages	Yes (Since 2015)
Stepchild adoption by same-sex couples	Yes (Since 2016)
Joint adoption by same-sex couples	Yes (Since 2017)
LGBT people allowed to serve openly in the military	Yes (Since 1993)
Right to change legal gender	Yes (Since 2015)
Legal recognition of non-binary gender	No
Gender self-identification	Yes (Since 2015)
Access to IVF for lesbian couples	Yes (Since 2000)
Altruistic surrogacy for gay male couples	No (Gestational carrier is recognised as mother in Irish law)
Automatic parenthood on birth certificates for children of same-sex couples	Yes (Since 2009)
Conversion therapy banned	No (Proposed)
Commercial surrogacy for gay couples	No (Commercial surrogacy outlawed regardless of sexual orientation)
Expungement scheme or pardon law implemented	No (Proposed)
MSMs allowed to donate blood with certain conditions - such as being monogamous	Yes (Since 2022)
Legal recognition of intersex people	No
Intersex human rights	No

== See also ==
- LGBTQ rights in Europe
- LGBTQ rights in the European Union
- Campaign for Homosexual Law Reform (Ireland)
- BeLonG To (BeLonG To Youth Services)
- Outhouse LGBTQ+ Centre LGBTQ+ community and resource centre
- Gay and Lesbian Equality Network (GLEN)
- List of Laws and Reports on Gay and Lesbian Rights in Ireland
- Same-sex marriage in the Republic of Ireland
- List of LGBTQ politicians in Ireland
