= The Outing Festival =

Annual LGBTQ+ event in Ireland

- Frequency: Annually in February
- Location: Ireland
- Inaugurated: February 2013; 13 years ago
- Organiser: Eddie McGuinness (founder and festival director)
- Sponsors: The Outing Queer Arts Collective; Fáilte Ireland; Blacknight Solutions; Visit Clare; Limerick Pride; Quare Clare
- Website: theouting.ie

The Outing Festival is the world's only LGBT+ matchmaking festival held in County Clare, Ireland in February. In 2026, it was held as part of the The Outing Queer Arts Collective and Winter Pride Festival.

== History ==
The Outing Festival began in 2013, launched as the world's first LGBT+ matchmaking festival in Lisdoonvarna, County Clare, inspired by the long-standing matchmaking festival. It was founded by Eddie McGuinness. The 2014 festival was hosted by Panti Bliss with Willie Daly as the matchmaker. As well as matchmaking, the event hosts comedy, live music, DJs, queer arts, and drag performances.

In 2015, Katrina Leskanich and The Nualas performed at the festival.

1000 people attended the festival in 2023, with people attending from other countries. The 2024 festival was hosted by festival director, Eddie McGuinness, and drag queen Victoria's Secret, and took place in Dromoland. In 2026, The Outing Queer Arts Collective and Winter Pride Festival was held in Ennis. The Cheeky Girls performed at the 2026 festival.
