= Gay and Lesbian Equality Network =

Defunct Irish LGBT rights group

- Formation: 1988; 38 years ago
- Type: LGBT rights lobby group
- Location: Ireland

The Gay and Lesbian Equality Network (GLEN) was an Irish LGBTQ rights group based in Dublin, Ireland. It was founded in 1988 by Don Donnelly, Charles Kerrigan, Suzy Byrne, Kieran Rose and Christopher Robson. It focused on achieving change in legislation and social policy to achieve full equality and inclusion for lesbian, gay and bisexual and transgender (LGBT) people in Ireland, and protection from all forms of discrimination. Its board of directors were Margot Slattery (chair), Simon Nugent, Muriel Walls, Séamus Dooley and Dr. Fergus Ryan. In May 2017 it was announced that it would close.

== Official opening ==
On 3 April 2006, then Taoiseach Bertie Ahern performed the official opening of GLEN's new offices in Fumbally Court in Dublin 8. This was a moment of some historical significance as he was the first head of an Irish Government to visit an LGBTQ organisation. The Taoiseach also launched GLEN's five-year strategic plan entitled "Building Sustainable Change" which set out the priorities of the organisation going forward, the main one being the enactment of legislation providing for the legal recognition of same-sex relationships. In a speech to assembled guests, Mr Ahern declared that "Sexual orientation cannot, and must not, be the basis of a second-class citizenship. Our laws have changed, and will continue to change, to reflect this principle."

== Staff ==
The last GLEN staff members were:

- vacancy – Executive Director
- Marie Hamilton – Administration Manager
- Odhrán Allen – Director of Mental Health
- Davin Roche – Director of Workplace Diversity
- Eimear O'Reilly - Senior Workplace Diversity Lead
- Ross Flanagan - Communications and Events Officer

== Legal recognition of same-sex relationships ==
GLEN Director of Policy Change, Eoin Collins, was appointed to a Working Group on Domestic Partnership established by the Government in early 2006. The purpose of the group was to present options regarding the legal recognition of same-sex unions for the Minister for Justice to consider. It was chaired by lawyer and former Progressive Democrats Teachta Dála Anne Colley. The Colley Report was published in November 2006 and outlined just two options to be considered – the opening up of marriage to lesbian and gay couples, which was stated as the full equality option, or full civil partnership which would provide all the rights and responsibilities of marriage.

In the May 2007 Irish general election, all of the main political parties committed themselves to legislating in this area if they formed part of the new government. Following negotiations between Fianna Fáil and The Green Party, the two parties produced a Programme for Government in June 2007. The document contained the following commitment on the legal recognition of same-sex unions: "This Government is committed to full equality for all in our society. Taking account of the options paper prepared by the Colley Group and the pending Supreme Court case, we will legislate for civil partnerships at the earliest possible date in the lifetime of the Government." GLEN strongly welcomed the commitment to introduce change based on the findings of the Colley Report and looks forward to working with the government to bring about equality for the LGB population in Ireland.

The Heads of Bill for civil partnership were published by the Irish government on 24 June 2008 and GLEN strongly welcomed this. Speaking in response to the proposed legislation, GLEN chairman Kieran Rose said, "Comprehensive civil partnership, as proposed in the Heads of Bill, is a major milestone towards equality. The goal of GLEN is access to full equality through civil marriage and this Bill is a fundamental step forward towards this goal. The provisions outlined today will resolve many immediate and pressing issues faced by lesbian and gay couples and will also provide a platform for further progress." On 26 June 2009, the Civil Partnership Bill was published by Minister for Justice Dermot Ahern. GLEN again strongly supported this development but also expressed concern about the absence of any provision in the Bill to provide legal support and recognition of the many children being parented by same-sex couples. At this time GLEN published three documents to inform both policy makers and the LGBT community about the Civil Partnership Bill. These were:

- A Chronology of Key Events: GLEN's Campaign for Legal Recognition of Same-Sex Relationships and Families
- Civil Partnership – Your Questions Answered: A Comprehensive Analysis of the Civil Partnership Bill
- Civil Partnership: An Overview

Following the passage of the Civil Partnership and Certain Rights and Obligations of Cohabitants Act 2010 through the lower and upper houses of the Oireachtas, GLEN published the Seanad speeches to celebrate and mark the passage of this historic piece of legislation. At the launch of Seanad Debates on Civil Partnership July 2010, Minister for Justice Dermot Ahern stated, "I want to compliment GLEN for the way in which they lobbied to bring us to where we are today. I know it's their view that there is more to be done and that's definitely their view and their wish and I wish them well in that respect. I do want to compliment them on the realistic and reasonable way in which they lobbied all of the political parties and all of the political parties would have had some issues in relation to this particular piece of legislation. But GLEN did it in such a way that I think everyone fully understood that they were being reasonable and they understood the parameters within which we were required to work… Today is a celebration for all of the people in GLEN and the other organisations who have been lobbying for this. GLEN have done a marvellous job and I want to thank all the people associated with GLEN for the way in which they did their business and particularly thank them for the excellent productions that they have brought forward very quickly as a result of the passing of this legislation."

GLEN's support for the Civil Partnership legislation received criticism from some elements of the LGBT community who believed that the Civil Partnership Bill was discriminatory and inadequate.

== Workplace and economy/ Diversity Champions ==
"All employees should have the opportunity to perform at their best – meaning that they must feel comfortable in their environment. This is done through creating a diverse and inclusive workplace. We can take best advantage of our differences – for innovation. Our diversity is a competitive advantage and consciously building diverse teams helps us drive the best results for our clients"

— Peter O’Neill, Country general manager, IBM Ireland 2013.

GLEN launched the Diversity Champions Programme which is Ireland's first and only not-for-profit workplace programme designed specifically to assist Irish employers with the inclusion of lesbian, gay, and bisexual (LGB) employees. Members include major employers such as Accenture, IBM and University College Dublin, who as members receive a range of benefits and services including a dedicated client account manager, seminars on LGBT issues, networking events for LGBT employees, high quality training, benchmarking and other opportunities for companies to build their brand and reputation on diversity.

The Diversity Champions Programme builds on a body of work and engagement between GLEN and major employers, employer organisations and trade unions. This has included:

- Development of GLEN's Excellence in Diversity resource - www.excellenceindiversity.ie - an on-line toolkit designed to help employers implement and benchmark good practice, and launched by Ernst & Young. It was funded by the Equality Mainstreaming Unit which is jointly funded by the European Social Fund 2007–2013 and by the Equality Authority;
- Launch in 2010 by the then Tánaiste and Minister for Enterprise, Trade and Employment of the GLEN document "Lesbian, Gay & Bisexual Diversity in the Workplace", https://web.archive.org/web/20140717042602/http://www.glen.ie/attachments/e518164e-cef4-4073-ac06-92918db2249e.PDF supported by IBEC (the main Irish employers’ organisation), IBM Ireland, Business in the Community, the Irish Congress of Trade Unions and the Equality Authority.
- Launch of joint GLEN/Irish Congress of Trade Union guide Being LGBT at Work: A Guide for LGBT People and Trade Unions. https://web.archive.org/web/20160304093020/http://www.glen.ie/attachments/c2e25865-4ee4-4515-91d6-c2c4886349f7.PDF

GLEN has also responded to major employers in Ireland – Microsoft, Citigroup, Google, PwC and Dublin City University – seeking information on civil partnership, which has major implications for employment law and practice. The new law provides for equal treatment between married couples and civil partners in pension provision, workplace benefits and the new equality ground of civil status.

"Dublin is now a multi-cultural city, and this diversity is now part of the identity of the city. Equality and social justice can contribute to Dublin’s international competitiveness"

— Andrew Montague, Lord Mayor of Dublin 2011.

GLEN and Dublin City Council worked successfully on a project to build a consensus on the economic case for equality. This culminated in a seminar event, "Globalisation, Diversity and Economic Renewal", launched by the Lord Mayor of Dublin and featuring Professor Sean Kay, author of Celtic Revival? The Rise, Fall and Renewal of Global Ireland as the keynote speaker. The event also involved prominent speakers from the areas of economic and business policy development.

GLEN also published a report Equality, Diversity and Economic Competitiveness. The project was funded by the European Union's PROGRESS Programme (2007–2013) and the Equality Authority. https://web.archive.org/web/20160304191603/http://www.glen.ie/news-post.aspx?contentid=998&title=glendublin_city_council_seminar_on_globalisation_diversity_and_economic_renewal

== Funding ==
GLEN has been a registered charity since 2005. It receives funding from the Health Service Executive (HSE), but also has received funding from Atlantic Philanthropies - GLEN received $4,727,860 between 2005 and 2011.

This led to criticism by Breda O'Brien, patron of the largely Roman Catholic Iona Institute pressure group, that it is used funding from abroad to influence legislation and for political campaigning in elections such as during the Marriage Referendum. The Iona Institute had itself been criticised for political campaigning while failing to register with the Standards in Public Office Commission, which monitors political donations. It did not do so until the middle of the 2015 same-sex marriage referendum campaign, explaining its change of policy was because it wanted to "play a fuller part" in the campaign.

== Financial controversies ==
In April 2017, GLEN was directed by the Charities Regulator to provide it with financial records, following an internal review of its corporate governance procedures and a voluntary disclosure to the Regulator. Áine Duggan stated that irregularities were noticed shortly after she was appointed executive director in October 2016.

The issues relate unaccounted for expenses of up to €60,000, the use of Government funding for political campaigns and the use of GLEN credit cards for personal purchases (later reimbursed). GLEN founder and co-chairman Kieran Rose resigned as co-chair in 2016 after it emerged campaign literature for his Seanad election campaign was printed at the charity. While the cost of the printing had been reimbursed, the organisation sought clarification from the regulator in case it had breached rules limiting the involvement of charities in political campaigning. Rose resigned from the board of GLEN in April 2017 as "an aspect of Glen's support to him in 2016 is causing a distraction to the work of Glen and to other issues that are under review by the Charities Regulator."

The then Minister for Social Protection, Leo Varadkar, highlighted the "really important work" done by GLEN but said it was very important any issues were fully investigated and that "anything that needs to be put right is put right". GLEN's board stated that it "is satisfied that all grants received have been used for the intended purpose and has no reason to suspect there has been any misappropriation of funds.

Following comments by Duggan, Mary Lou McDonald TD, said she intended to raise the issues around financial irregularites at GLEN at the Dáil Public Accounts Committee. GLEN intends appointing an interim executive director following the resignation of Áine Duggan.

== Bullying allegations ==
Allegations of bullying in GLEN surfaced in 2017. One of two complainants has since resigned. An external examiner has been appointed to look into the allegations.

== See also ==
- LGBT rights in the Republic of Ireland
- List of LGBT rights organisations
