= Tonie Walsh =

Irish newspaper editor

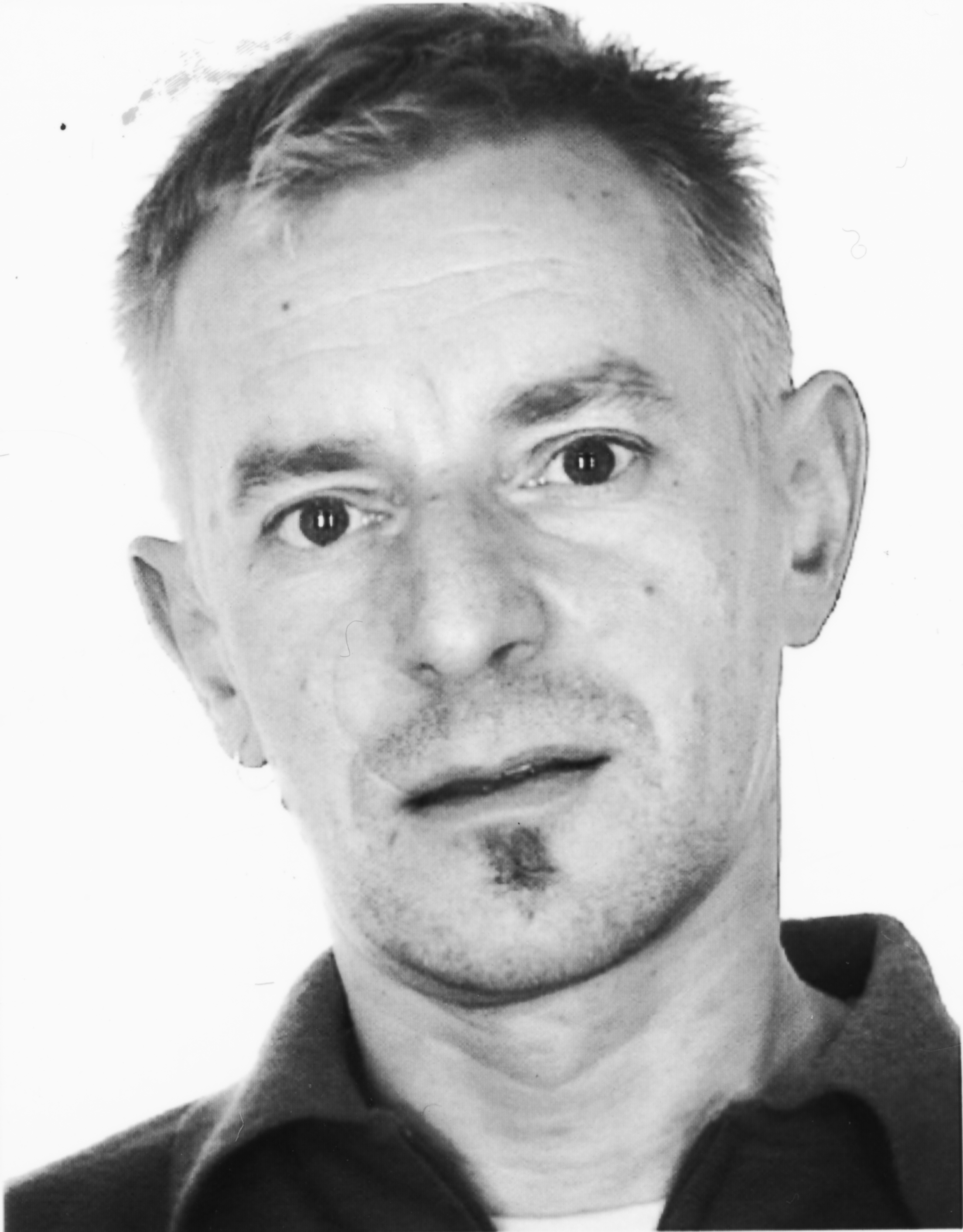

Tonie Walsh (born 25 December 1960 in Dublin, Ireland) is an LGBT rights activist, journalist, disc jockey, founding editor of Gay Community News (Dublin) and founder of the Irish Queer Archive.

== Biography ==
Walsh spent most of his childhood in Clonmel, County Tipperary. His twenties were spent mainly in the gay civil rights movement in Dublin, during which time he was one of the prime movers behind Dublin's LGBT community space, the Hirschfeld Centre.

Walsh was president of the National LGBT Federation (NXF) from 1984 to 1989, at a time when it was co-litigant with Senator David Norris in his constitutional action (Norris v. Ireland). During this period Walsh worked as a staff reporter with Ireland's first commercial LGBT magazine, OUT, which folded in 1988. Walsh along with gay activist Catherine Glendon founded Gay Community News, an A3 newspaper which he also edited during its first two years. GCN is Ireland's longest-running LGBTQ publication.

He ran for election twice, in the 1985 Dublin City Council election and in the 1989 Irish general election in the Dublin South-East constituency as an independent but supported by the Gay and Lesbian Equality Campaign.

After ten years of activism, Walsh followed his boyfriend to London where he remained for a time, before returning to his native town and launching himself as a DJ and club promoter. Throughout the 1990s, Walsh played at well known club nights among them Horny Organ Tribe, Elevator, the fetish club GAG, Powderbubble, H.A.M., Cork's club Telefunkin and the HIV/AIDS fund-raising alternative beauty pageant Alternative Miss Ireland.

In 1997, he reorganised the National LGBT Federation archive holdings into what would later become the Irish Queer Archive (IQA). Drawing on materials from IQA's collection, Walsh curated both "Pride and Protest" at Belfast's Central Library (2005) and "Revolting Homosexuals" (Outhouse and GUBU, Dublin 2004). "A Liberating Party", a site-specific exhibition on the history of LGBT Pride in Ireland commissioned by Thisispopbaby, was created for Dublin's Project Arts Centre in 2009. It has since gone on to tour art centres and libraries across Ireland. On 16 June 2008, the Irish Queer Archive officially transferred its materials to the National Library of Ireland marking it as a significant and historical event.

Walsh initiated the "Queer History Walking Tour of Dublin" in 2009 when he and longtime friend and political associate David Norris entertained over 100 people on a three-hour stroll across Dublin city. The tour became an instant success and has been a permanent feature of Dublin Pride ever since.

In 2006, Tonie Walsh retired as a professional DJ and club promoter to concentrate on a number of research and writing projects. He spent much of the following decade living at Clonmel, being a full-time carer to his mother, Sylvia, who had Parkinson's and dementia.

As an advocate for a more holistic and upfront sexual health education strategy in Ireland, Tonie Walsh publicly declared his HIV Poz status in a Facebook 'manifesto' marking World AIDS Day 2015. The following year, at a seminar in Maynooth University he launched a campaign to build an Irish AIDS Memorial. His proposal was later embraced by Taoiseach Leo Varadkar. After an OPW competition, the Irish HIV/AIDS Memorial "Closed Loop" was unveiled on World AIDS Day 2023 in Dublin's Phoenix Park.

In 2017, Dublin's celebrated theatre and performance group, thisispopbaby, signalled its plan to put Walsh on stage in a one-man show centred around his experience as a campaigner, as 'a witness to massive social upheaval in Ireland', entitled, "I Am Tonie Walsh". Presented in development at the Dublin Theatre Festival 2017, 'I Am Tonie Walsh' is listed as documentary theatre about "active citizenship, creativity over consumption, community; about standing up for what is right – and being fabulous while doing so". Described by director, Tom Creed, as a "meditation on grief", the show premiered at Dublin's Project Arts Centre in Winter 2018. Walsh has described the show as "part catharsis, part entertainment...a reassessment".

Based between Dublin and Antalya, Turkey, Walsh continues to independently curate the Irish Queer Archive and hosts regular walking tours.

== Personal life ==
He is the brother of Paul Walsh, one-time lead singer of Dublin indie band, Royseven. Walsh is a great-grandson of Hector Hughes, former Labour MP for Aberdeen (UK), and Isa Hughes (née Lawler), suffragist and founding secretary-manager of Dublin's Gate Theatre. His great-uncle, Liam Ó Briain was a noted civil rights activist and instigator of the Galway theatre Taibhdhearc na Gaillimhe.
