= Gaze (film festival) =

LGBTQ film festival in Ireland

GAZE International LGBT Film Festival Dublin
- 2017 logo
- Location: Dublin, Ireland
- Founded: 1992
- Festival date: July/August
- Language: English and others
- Website: gaze.ie

The GAZE International LGBT Film Festival Dublin (typeset as GAZE and formerly known as the Dublin Lesbian and Gay Film Festival) is an annual film festival which takes place in Dublin, Ireland each Bank Holiday weekend in late July and early August. Founded in 1992, it has become Ireland's largest LGBTQ film event, and the country's biggest LGBT gathering aside from Dublin Pride.

== Premise ==
GAZE's organisers seek out educational and entertaining LGBT cinema which members of the Dublin gay community may not have had the opportunity to view elsewhere.

The programme also includes films by gay artists which don't contain gay themes, and films which have inspired or are inspired by gay artists.

== History ==
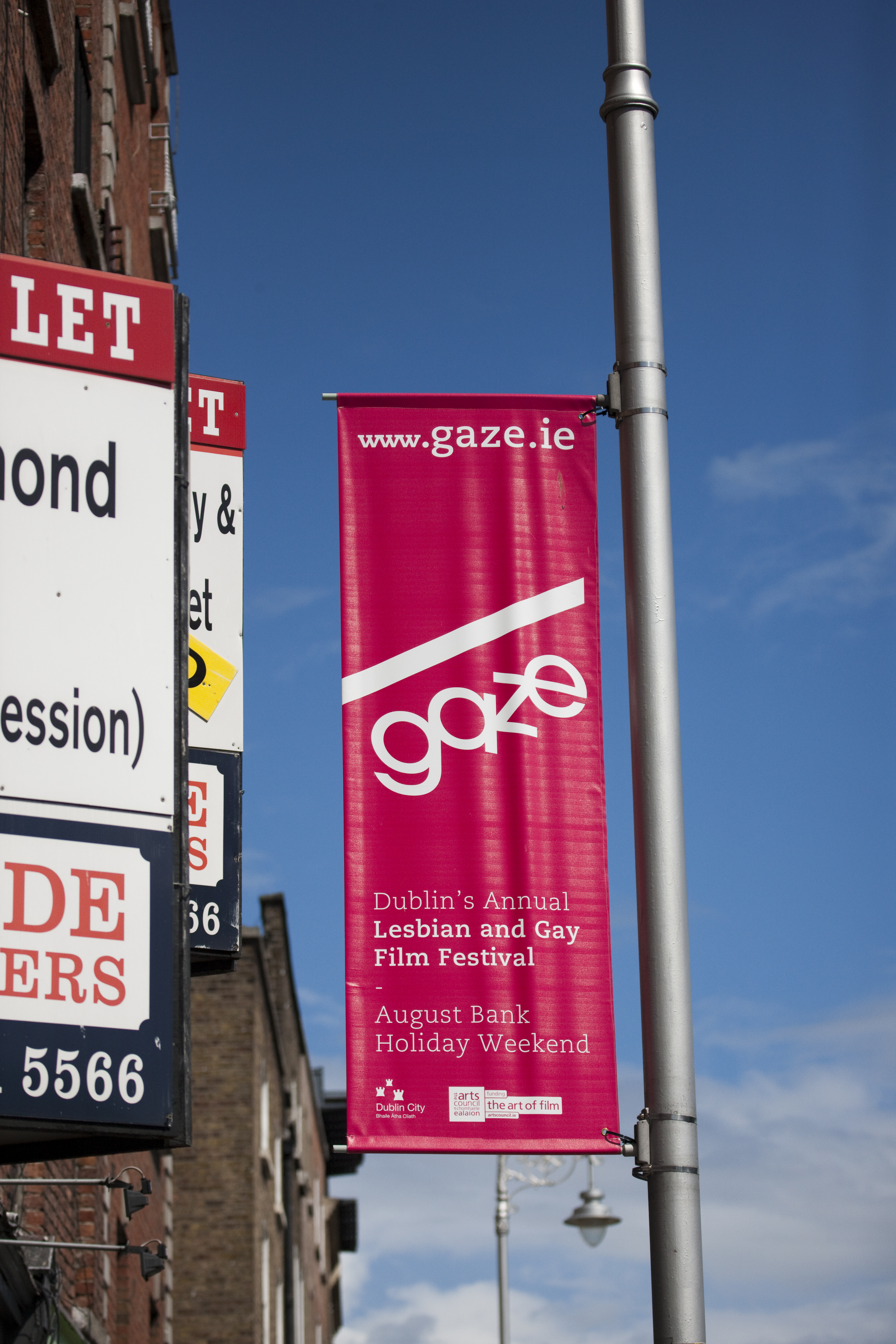
Advertising banner, 2009

The festival began life as the Lesbian and Gay Film Festival in 1992, founded by Yvonne O'Reilly and Kevin Sexton; it was held in the Irish Film Centre.

Over 3,500 people attended in 2006, the last year before the rebranding as GAZE.

The Dublin Lesbian and Gay Film Festival was renamed GAZE in 2007. Over 4,000 people attended the 2007 festival, the 15th.

In 2007, the festival acquired a new director in Michele Devlin, the programmer of the Belfast Film Festival. An updated version of The Picture of Dorian Gray by Oscar Wilde, with the story set in New York in the 1980s, was one of the programme's highlights.

The 2008 event, the 16th, lasted from 31 July until 4 August and included screenings at Dublin's Project Arts Centre and the Winding Stair, alongside its usual venue the Irish Film Institute.

GAZE 2009, the 17th festival, took place over five days at the Light House Cinema in Smithfield from 30 July until 3 August. An HBO remake of the classic documentary Grey Gardens, starring Drew Barrymore and Jessica Lange, received its European premiere when it opened the festival on 30 July. Over sixty-seven films, including premieres, documentaries and shorts were featured at the event.

GAZE's 23rd programme was announced on 25 July 2015, with screenings taking place from 30 July to 3 August at the Light House Cinema.

In 2017, the Gaze Film Festival celebrated its 25th year of sharing movies, documentaries, and short films about the LGBTQ community, taking place at the Light House Cinema from 3 August to 7 August. The festival kicked off with the world premiere screening of documentary The 34th: The Story of Marriage Equality in Ireland, telling of the quarter-century fight for – and achievement of – a transformation in Irish society's relationship to its LGBT members, in which the LGBT community, including GAZE, participated – one that culminated in the 2015 Irish Marriage Referendum. Almost 12,000 people were expected to attend the 2017 festival event. Former President Mary McAleese attended and spoke at the event.

The 2018 Gaze Film Festival ran 2–6 August at the Light House Cinema, and included a side programme, Gaze on Tour, promoting Irish productions.

== Organisation ==
The festival is collated and overseen by a programmer or director, answerable to a voluntary board, and supported by a range of volunteers. Major sponsors include Dublin City Council, the Arts Council of Ireland and Accenture.

== See also ==
- List of LGBT film festivals
