= Irish Gay Dads =

Advocacy group

- Formation: March 28, 2016; 10 years ago
- Founder: Daragh Nener-Lally
- Purpose: Activism
- Location: Dublin, Ireland
- Members: 1,000+
- Chairperson: Séamus Kearney Martone
- Affiliations: Equality for Children, Assisted Human Reproduction Coalition
- Website: irishgaydads.ie

Irish Gay Dads is a community and children's rights advocacy group in Ireland. It was founded in 2016.

== History ==
=== Early days ===
Irish Gay Dads was founded in 2016 by Daragh Nener-Lally. He and his husband began learning about starting a family through surrogacy, and encountered obstacles and a lack of clear information on the practicalities and legal status of international surrogacy for Irish citizens. While LGBTQ+ groups and international forums for fathers existed at the time, there were none specifically focused on the situation for male parents from the LGBTQ+ community in Ireland and the Irish diaspora, and so Nener-Lally created Irish Gay Dads as a group on Facebook.

=== Appearance at Oireachtas Committee ===
In 2022, Irish Gay Dads was invited to appear at the Oireachtas Joint Committee on International Surrogacy.

Father-of-three Gearoid Kenny Moore, of Irish Gay Dads, called for legislation which would recognise the legal status of parents, both male and female, who have a child through surrogacy, and called on committee members to ensure that children have access to information regarding their origins and that intended parents are "treated equally by providing pre-birth determination in relation to parental rights". Mr Kenny Moore told members that parents like him live in constant fear of what might happen if a biological parent were to die and a "non-recognised parent" was left behind.

Shane Lennon of Irish Gay Dads pointed out to the committee that article 41 of Bunreacht na hÉireann sets out that it a fundamental right of Irish citizens and married persons to make own their decisions when undertaking matters in relation family planning, and so asked "If marriage is the foundation to our family in our legal system, how can the same legal system not support the growth of my family?"

=== Key moments ===
- November 2023: The group launched a campaign called No More Delays, consisting of video messages from several gay dads in Ireland speaking directly to camera, addressing Minister for Health Stephen Donnelly, imploring no more delays with surrogacy legislation: “Minister Stephen Donnelly, the spotlight is on you”.
- January 2024: The group joined with two other groups to respond to Pope Francis's call to ban surrogacy
- In June 2024 the group gave a mixed response to the passing of the Assisted Human Reproduction Bill through the final stages of the Dáil. The group's Chairperson Séamus Kearney Martone told Newstalk Radio that the legislation is incomplete. "A lot of our families will be protected by this," he said, but while many families will receive a declaration of parentage, "a lot of them won't — if I think about couples living abroad."

== Goals ==
According to the group's website, the Irish Gay Dads community is made up of families and dads-to-be seeking advice and support on surrogacy, adoption, fostering, and coparenting, and the group has two main goals:

- To provide a supportive and friendly environment where members can share their personal experiences and seek guidance
- To advocate for change and work towards legal equality for all families, regardless of their background or composition.
