= Declan Flynn =

Murdered Irish gay man (1951–1982)

- Born: 22 July 1951; Dublin, Ireland
- Died: 9 September 1982 (aged 31); Dublin, Ireland

Declan Flynn (22 July 1951 – 9 September 1982) was an Irish gay man attacked and killed in Fairview Park in Dublin. His death came about as a result of a series of beatings meted out to gay men in Dublin who used Fairview Park as a meeting place at the time. His murder is seen as the catalyst for the LGBTQ Pride movement in the Republic of Ireland.

== Personal life ==
Flynn was an Aer Rianta worker in Dublin who lived on Swords Road, Whitehall, Dublin. Flynn was known to young gay activists, though not very well. Flynn had helped out on occasion at the Hirschfeld Centre in the nascent Temple Bar, a resource centre for the gay community, but was spotted there infrequently. He was on the centre's social committee and volunteered at its café. Flynn's family, who lived near the park on the Swords Road, did not know that he was gay. Nor did they know he frequented places where other young gay men went to find sexual partners. Indeed, Declan Flynn's father, Christopher Flynn, said his son was not gay.

== Killing ==
A series of homophobic beatings was carried out in Fairview Park during the summer of 1982. Fairview Park was a popular gay cruising area at that time. On the night of 9 September 1982, Flynn had gone with a friend to Belton's Pub in Donnycarney, a short distance from his home. When he left the pub around 11:45 that night, he spoke for a while with his friend and then walked home along Collins' Avenue to Swords Road, before making his way through Fairview Park. Along the way Flynn called to the Fairview Grill where he met with a male friend who gave him a peck on his cheek as they were parting. His body was found badly beaten about the head in Fairview Park on the morning of 10 September 1982 and was taken to Blanchardstown Hospital. Initial reports were that he had died as a result of head injuries. Gardaí initially worked on the theory that he died after being robbed as he carried no identification nor money. At the inquest, the coroner heard that North Strand Depot Fire Station received a call at 1:45 am on 10 September to go to Fairview Park. They arrived at 1:48 am and found Flynn, his body still warm but there was no sign of life or a pulse. He was brought to Blanchardstown Hospital, being the only hospital on call on the north side of the city. The pathologist said that it would have made no difference if Flynn had been brought to another hospital. He went on to say that if the blood which had built up in Flynn's respiratory system had been removed quickly he might have lived, but this would have had to be done on the spot.

== Murder charges and trial ==
On Sunday, 12 September 1982, a 14-year-old juvenile was charged with Flynn's murder at a special sitting of Dublin District Court at the Bridewell. He was remanded in custody.

The beatings were carried out by a gang of 5 men:

- Anthony (Tony) Maher (aged 19) of Poplar Row Flats, Ballybough;
- Robert Alan Armstrong (aged 18) of Plunkett Drive, Finglas West;
- Patrick Kavanagh (aged 18) of St Brigid's Avenue, North Strand;
- Colm Donovan (aged 17) of Buckingham Street Lower; and
- a 14-year-old boy who could not be named for legal reasons.

As Flynn lay dying, £4 from his pocket and his watch were stolen. Applications were made for separate murder trials for each of the five which was turned down by the Central Criminal Court on 22 February 1983. The murder trial of the 14-year-old commenced on 1 March 1983. Maher, Armstrong, Kavanagh and Donovan pleaded guilty to manslaughter and their sentencing was put back until the conclusion of the murder trial against the 14-year-old.

The 14-year-old gave a statement to Gardaí concerning the killing. In the statement which was opened in Court at the murder trial, he said that he had gone to see a friend in Donnycarney on the night of the 9 September and left at midnight cycling down Malahide Road. Whilst cycling through Fairview Park he saw a gang and he went over to see them. One of the gang said to him: "Hide behind a tree. We are going to bash a queer". After hiding his bike, he joined the gang to hide behind a tree. One of the gang went and sat alone on a bench. His statement went on to say that a man (Declan Flynn) approached one of the gang on the bench. Following contact between the men, Flynn fled running away and he heard someone shout "Get him." One of the other accused then tripped the man. The 14-year-old said that he had a skinny branch as a weapon and the others had sticks. His statement said that he saw some of the gang hit the man who was lying on the ground with the sticks.

Counsel for the 14-year-old described the case as one of the saddest and most tragic cases to come before any court. He said that the only evidence against the 14-year-old was his statement and that he said that he had only struck Flynn "on the arse" and could not have anything to do with his death. Counsel for the accused said no aspersions were being cast on the character of Flynn and that there was no attempt to justify or excuse "queer bashing" whatever that was. Mr Justice Seán Gannon charged the jury to find the accused not guilty on the murder count. Following a deliberation of 3.5 hours, the jury returned its verdict of guilty of manslaughter. Sentencing was adjourned to 8 March 1983.

Armstrong and Maher gave statements to the Gardaí admitting their part in the killing. They had returned to the park after leaving their girlfriends at home and were joined by Kavanagh and Donovan. Armstrong stated that: "We were part of the team to get rid of queers from Fairview Park." In his statement which was read to court, he told Gardaí: "A few of us had been queer-bashing for about six weeks before and battered about 20 steamers. We used to grab them. If they hit back we gave it to them." He indicated that he had not meant to kill Flynn and had dialed 999 for an ambulance when he saw blood coming from his mouth. At trial, the court heard that Flynn had inhaled from blood bleeding from his mouth and nose and had died from asphyxia.

At sentencing, all five walked free as they were given suspended sentences with Mr. Justice Seán Gannon telling them that they would have to serve their sentences if they got into trouble again. The judge said that he must demonstrate the abhorrence of the community by imposing sentences, but that he didn't think it necessary that they be served immediately by detention.

This could never be regarded as murder

In suspending the sentences of all, Mr Justice Gannon said:

One thing that has come to my mind is that there is no element of correction that is required. All of you come from good homes and experienced care and affection

== Fallout ==
When Flynn's father was asked to comment on the outcome of the case he said: "I had expected that justice would be done and be seen to be done."

The Irish Times reported that youngsters at a block of flats were in an almost celebratory mood following the handing down of the suspended sentences. One local woman told its reporter that there had been cheering when the news of the suspended sentences reached the neighbourhood.

The decision not to jail the killers drew strong statements of surprise and concern from all parties. Calls were made for the Minister for Justice to inquire into all aspects of the case and present a full report to the Dáil as a matter of urgency. The sentence was contrasted with a case where a man who stole a purse and cash worth £20.36 was imprisoned for 12 months. David Norris said he was very concerned at the outcome of the case because it would appear to give a free hand to vigilante gangs out to intimidate gays saying: "It could be interpreted as a licence to kill".

The sentencing gave rise to a debate in the Dáil on 10 March 1983 during which calls were made for uniformity of sentencing. It was pointed out that one of the young people who was sentenced to a 12 months suspended sentence was sentenced previously to a two-year suspended sentence for the theft of a car. This was stated to clearly indicate the inconsistency in sentencing policy which is very hard to justify. There were demands in the Dáil for the dismissal of Mr Justice Seán Gannon.

Armstrong was back before court on Friday 11 March 1983 where he was convicted in Dublin District Court of daubing the words "Up the IRA" on an advertising board in Fairview. He was ordered to pay the £20 cost of replacement to the owners of the board, and was given one month to pay a fine of £20.

Armstrong and Maher were, at the time of the killing, Airmen in the Irish Air Corps of the Defence Forces. In keeping with normal Defence Forces procedures, an army officer monitored the trial and reported to their commanding officer. The then-General Officer Commanding the Air Corps, General James Connolly, decided, after a 30-day wait for the lodge of an appeal that under Defence Force Regulations, that as a result of their convictions for manslaughter that they should be discharged from the Defence Forces.

In response to Justice Gannon's verdict, the largest gay rights demonstration ever seen on the island of Ireland took place on Saturday 19 March 1983. Approximately 400 men, women, and children marched in protest against street violence against homosexuals, lesbians, and women and the unjust sentences handed down by the courts in these cases. The demonstrators marched from Liberty Hall to Fairview Park. The march was organised by the Dublin Gay Collective with support from the National Gay Federation, the Anti-Amendment Campaign, Women's Right to Choose Campaign, the Irish Council for Civil Liberties, the Dublin Rape Crisis Centre, the Union of Students in Ireland, the Socialist Workers Movement, the anarchist Workers Solidarity Movement, members of the Drumcondra branch of Sinn Féin along with many other NGOs.

On 1 December 1987, Armstrong was sentenced to 10 years in prison when he admitted to raping a woman who was 7 months pregnant after giving her young children sweets to keep them quiet. Armstrong and Paul Davis broke into the victim's flat and raped her while her husband was at work. Armstrong told the victim that she had the choice of getting a kick in the stomach or being raped.

== Memorial ==
In 2013, independent councillor Damian O'Farrell submitted a proposal that the revamped Fairview Park footbridge be named after the late Declan Flynn. Councillor O'Farrell said it would be a fitting tribute, adding: "Declan Flynn was a gay man when homosexuality was a crime. The gay community is now a major part of Dublin. He was in the wrong place at the wrong time and naming Fairview footbridge after him will send a strong message that there is no place for racism and homophobia in our community." At a meeting of the North Central Area Committee Council meeting on the 16 February 2015, a second proposal was put forward in similar terms to rename the bridge by Councillor Seán Haughey. Clarification was sought on the previous proposal.

On the day that the Marriage Equality referendum passed, the bridge was decorated in his memory, with flowers and tributes being left at the park bench where the attack occurred.

RTÉ broadcast a documentary, The Case I Can’t Forget: The Killing of Declan Flynn, on 5 September 2022, to mark the 40th anniversary of Flynn's murder. The documentary featured interviews with his siblings, members of the gay community including Tonie Walsh and David Norris, and retired Detective Inspector Edwin Handcock, who led the investigation.

== See also ==
- Violence against LGBT people
- Charles Self
