= National LGBT Federation =

Irish LGBTQ rights organization

National Lesbian Federation
- Official National LGBT Federation logo
- Abbreviation: NLF
- Formation: 1979
- Type: Nonprofit company limited by guarantee
- Location: Dublin
- Chair: Gavin Hennessy
- Website: http://www.nxf.ie/
- Formerly called: National Gay Federation (1979–1990); National Lesbian and Gay Federation (1990–2014)

The National LGBT Federation (NXF) is a non-governmental organisation in Dublin, Ireland, which focuses on lesbian, gay, bisexual, and transgender (LGBTQ) rights.

The current board (as of September 2021) comprises the following: Chair Gavin Hennessy, Vice-Chair Steve Jacques, Emily Brennan, Brendan Byrne, Siobhan Curran, Claire Egan, Hayley Fox-Roberts, Adam Long, Mary McAuliffe, Conor McCarthy, Anna Nolan, Dr Chris Noone, Rob Partridge, and Steve Sands. High-profile feminist and LGBT+ advocate Ailbhe Smyth served as Chair of the organisation for many years.

== History ==
Previous logo of the NLGF, until 2014

The organisation was founded as the National Gay Federation (NGF) in 1979. It leased a building in Temple Bar, Dublin and established the Hirschfeld Centre, Ireland's first, full comprehensive LGBT community centre, named after the prominent German doctor and sexologist, Magnus Hirschfeld. The Centre included a meeting space, a café, and a full-automated 16mm cinema, the Hirschfeld Biograph. The Centre held a youth club, film club, and women's group, all funded by Flikkers, the centre's community disco. In 1981, NGF members participated in the first national gay conference organised by the Cork Gay Collective. On 4 November 1987, a fire irrevocably damaged the Hirschfeld Centre.

In September 1990, the NGF board voted to amend its name to the National Lesbian and Gay Federation (NLGF). The change was supported by 84% of NGF members. The name change took effect on 1 January 1991. In 2000, the NLGF was incorporated as a not-for-profit limited company by guarantee and achieved charitable status.

In February 2014, the NLGF was renamed the National LGBT Federation or NXF for short. A new logo was also unveiled. The announcement was made at an event in Dublin celebrating 35 years of the organisation's existence.

== Publications ==
=== Identity ===
From 1981 to 1984, the NGF published Identity, Ireland's first gay literary journal. Edited by renowned film-maker, Kieron Hickey, the publication was not profitable and ceased publication in March 1984, after its eighth issue.

=== Out ===
From 1984 to 1988, the NGF published Out magazine, Ireland's first commercial lesbian and gay magazine. Unlike Identity, Out magazine was distributed by Eason's. Contributors included Nell McCafferty, Tonie Walsh, Nuala O'Faolain and Thom McGinty. The final issue in October 1988 was delayed as the magazine printers, the Carlow Nationalist and Leinster Times, refused to print the previous issue due to an allegedly offensive Gay Health Action advertisement on safer sex for gay men.

=== Gay Community News ===
On 10 February 1988, the NGF published the Gay Community News (GCN), an 8-page tabloid newspaper. Tonie Walsh served as founding editor.

In 1997, NLGF and GCN moved from the Hirschfeld Centre to the Outhouse Community Centre, located on Wicklow Street in Dublin. When Outhouse moved offices to Capel Street, Dublin 1 in 2001, GCN moved to its own premises on Scarlett Row in Dublin 8.

Receipt of Atlantic Philanthropies funding in 2002 allowed NLGF to begin developing GCN as a commercially viable magazine.

== Irish Queer Archive ==
In 1980, members of the NGF created the Gay Community Archives, an archival collection of material and literature associated with the LGBT community in Ireland and precursor to the Irish Queer Archive.

The 1997 move from the Hirschfeld Centre allowed the IQA to open a small public office.

In December 1999, the NLGF board appointed an IQA working group, comprising academics, historians and writers.

In 2008, the Irish Queer Archive was donated to the National Library of Ireland. The collection contains over 250,000 press cuttings, photos, clippings for gay magazines and periodicals, and gay and lesbian films.

== GALAs ==
The Gay and Lesbian Awards (GALAs) is an annual, all-Ireland awards ceremony established to honour LGBT individuals and organisations. Categories include:

- Blogger/website of the year
- Broadcaster/journalist of the year
- Business person of the year
- Community organisation of the year
- Employer of the year
- International activist of the year
- Irish artist/entertainer of the year
- LGBT political figure of the year
- National event of the year
- Noel Walsh HIV activist of the year
- Person of the year
- Regional event of the year
- Voluntary organisation of the year
- Volunteer of the year

=== Previous winners ===
==== 2011 ====
- Alternative Miss Ireland
- Kerryann Conway
- Cork Women's Fun Weekend
- Emma Donoghue
- Paula Gilmore
- Glória
- Greenbow
- IBM
- Ireland AM
- Paisarn Likhitpreechakul
- Maman Poulet
- Maureen Looney
- Marriage Equality
- Mary McAleese

==== 2010 ====
- Darina Brennan
- Martina Devlin
- Lydia Foy
- An Garda Síochána
- Jimmy Goulding
- Growing Up Gay
- Joël Gustave Nana Ngongang
- David Norris
- Northwest Pride
- QueerID.com
- Billy Rabbitte
- Colm Tóibin

==== 2009 ====
- Ivana Bacik
- BeLonG To
- Bingham Cup 2008
- Margaret Gill
- Gaelick
- Google
- LGBT Noise*
- Jackie McKeown
- Panti (Rory O'Neill)
- Mick Quinlan
- Noel Walsh*
- Katherine Zappone and Ann Louise Gilligan

(* = joint winners)

== See also ==
- LGBT rights in the Republic of Ireland
