= Gay Community News (Dublin) =

LGBT community magazine based in Dublin

GCN (Gay Community News)
- GCN, Issue 1. Feb 1988.
- Type: LGBTQ+ monthly in print, daily online
- Owner: National Lesbian and Gay Federation
- Founder(s): Tonie Walsh and Catherine Glendon
- Publisher: National LGBT Federation
- Editor: Alice Linehan
- Managing editor: Stefano Pappalardo
- Lead Multimedia Journalist: Beatrice Fanucci
- Founded: 1988
- Relaunched: 2017
- Language: English
- Headquarters: Dublin, Ireland
- ISSN: 0791-7163
- Website: www.gcn.ie
- Free online archives: https://archive.gcn.ie/

Gay Community News (GCN) is Ireland's longest-running free LGBTQ+ publication and press; it is based in Dublin, and founded in 1988. It has been referred to as the "paper of record" for the Irish LGBTQ+ community.

== History ==
In the late 1980s, activists Tonie Walsh and Catherine Glendon sought to establish a free LGBTQ+ publication. The National Gay Federation (now National LGBT Federation) had previously published two unsuccessful LGBTQ+ periodicals, but agreed to establish an LGBTQ+ newspaper. GCN's first issue was published on 10 February 1988 as an eight-page tabloid newspaper. This first issue was designed by Niall Sweeney and in the 1990s was printed by The Meath Chronicle. It has been published consistently each month, with one exception. Its distribution was primarily through the pubs and clubs associated with the LGBTQ+ community, as well as other LGBTQ+ friendly spaces such as student unions, some books shops, and community and arts centres.

GCN is owned and published by the National LGBT Federation (NXF), which is a voluntary organisation. GCN was originally funded by the Irish state during the economically difficult 1980s and early 1990, it still carries funding banners from the National Development Plan and Pobal. GCN stated that government and advertising funding did not impact the editorial choices of the publication. During the early 1990s, prominent activists and writers, Suzy Byrne and Junior Larkin worked on the publication.

In March 1994, the publication introduced the Lesbian Pages, a section dedicated to the Lesbian community of Ireland. Activist group Lesbians Organising Together (LOT) worked with the GCN staff in an attempt to increase the representation of the lesbian community across all sections of the publication, but settled on the Lesbian Pages. The section was a success, particularly in the eyes of the LOT and lesbian community, leading to a wider visibility for lesbians in the publication as well as more women joining the team at GCN. The Lesbian Pages were renamed the Lesbian Life section in the November 1996 issue.

For issue 100, in 1997, GCN sponsored the first Irish Queer Writers Award, which was won in its inaugural year by Micheál Ó Conghaile and Padraig Rooney. During this time, GCN also published a number of collage cartoons by Margaret Lonergan about lesbian culture. By 1998, the publication had 2 full-time members of staff and 21 part-time positions funded by FÁS producing a 38-page freesheet.

In July 2003, Brian Finnegan was appointed editor, and GCN was relaunched as a full-colour magazine in an effort to make the publication more commercially viable, with funding from Atlantic Philanthropies. This relaunch led to the publication recording revenues after a number of years of loss. Following the economic downturn in 2008 and the loss of advertising revenue, GCN began to run fundraising campaigns.

GCN's online presence began in 2000. The website was relaunched in January 2014, under the new name TheOutmost.com. The website's title was changed back to GCN to correspond with a rebranding and full relaunch of the magazine in 2017.

In 2019, Lisa Connell was appointed to the position of managing editor of GCN to steer the organisation into its next chapter, with Peter Dunne as Editor of the print magazine and Head of Digital, Marketing and Development, Stefano Pappalardo, leading digital.

In 2022 GCN was awarded the 'Emerging Stronger – Digital for Good Award / Not-for-Profit’ Spider Award, recognising not for profit organisations that drive digital excellence throughout their website, social media or services.

In January 2023, GCN appointed group manager Michael Brett.

In June 2023, GCN launched its Digital Archive, making the first decade of the magazine freely available for online readers for the first time in its 35-year history. The digitisation of GCN's archive was funded through the LGBTI+ Community Services fund from the Department of Children, Equality, Disability, Integration and Youth.

In April 2024, GCN appointed Stefano Pappalardo as manager to lead Ireland's national LGBTQ+ media in its service to the community, with Alice Linehan as Editor of the print magazine and Beatrice Fanucci as Lead Multimedia Journalist.

GCN has expanded from a mon thly magazine into a national LGBTQ+ media outlet in Ireland. The organization distributes content through print and digital platforms, including news websites, social media channels, and live events.

== See also ==
- Irish Queer Archive
