= BeLonG To =

LGBTQ+ youth charity in Ireland

Belong To - LGBTQ+ Youth Ireland
- Formation: March 2003
- Type: NGO
- Legal status: Charity
- Purpose: LGBTQ+ youth organisation
- Headquarters: Parliament House, 13 Parliament Street, Dublin
- Region served: Ireland
- Members: LGBTQ+ young people from 14–23 years old
- CEO: Michael Barron (2003–2013); David Carroll (2013–2015); Moninne Griffith (2015–2025); Kieran O'Donovan (2026-present)
- Main organ: Board of Directors
- Affiliations: ILGA, ILGYO, NYCI
- Budget: €1,314,781
- Website: belongto.org

Belong To - LGBTQ+ Youth Ireland is the national organisation for LGBTQ+ young people in Ireland. Since 2003, Belong To has worked with LGBTQ+ youth to create a society where they safe to shine and can confidently shape their own futures. It is a registered charity and works with and for LGBT+ youth across Ireland.

Belong To offers advice, information and crisis counselling for LGBTQ+ youth, and supports LGBTQ+ youth groups across Ireland. Through training, they ensure LGBTQ+ young people are met by professionals, organisations, and services who are educated to meet and support their needs. The organisation also campaigns to ensure policy formation and practice is informed by the voice and experiences of LGBTQ+ young people.

== History ==
Belong To has its origins in an earlier Dublin-based youth group called OutYouth, which was run by youth volunteers in conjunction with the Gay Switchboard Dublin. Due to the voluntary nature of the group its operation was sometimes sporadic. In the final years of OutYouth, the group met with other LGBT organisations in Dublin and the City of Dublin Youth Services Board to seek funding for a new youth service project. The project secured funding from the Irish Department of Education and Belong To was formed in March 2003.

== Groups ==
Dublin

- Under 18's for 14- to 17-year-olds.
- IndividualiTy for 18- to 23-year-olds who are trans or questioning.
- Over 18's for 18- to 23-year-olds.

== See also ==
- LGBT rights in the Republic of Ireland
