= Dublin Pride =

Annual LGBTQ+ event in Dublin, Ireland

Dublin LGBTQ+ Pride Festival Bród Átha Cliath
- Flyer advertising the 2008 Dublin Pride parade
- Genre: LGBTQ+ festival
- Frequency: Annually; last Saturday in June
- Locations: Dublin, Ireland
- Inaugurated: 27 June 1974; 52 years ago
- Previous event: 18 June 2020 – 28 June 2020
- Organiser: Dublin City Council
- Sponsors: An Post; Axa Ireland; Bank of America; Facebook; Sky Ireland; Tesco Ireland; The George
- Website: dublinpride.ie

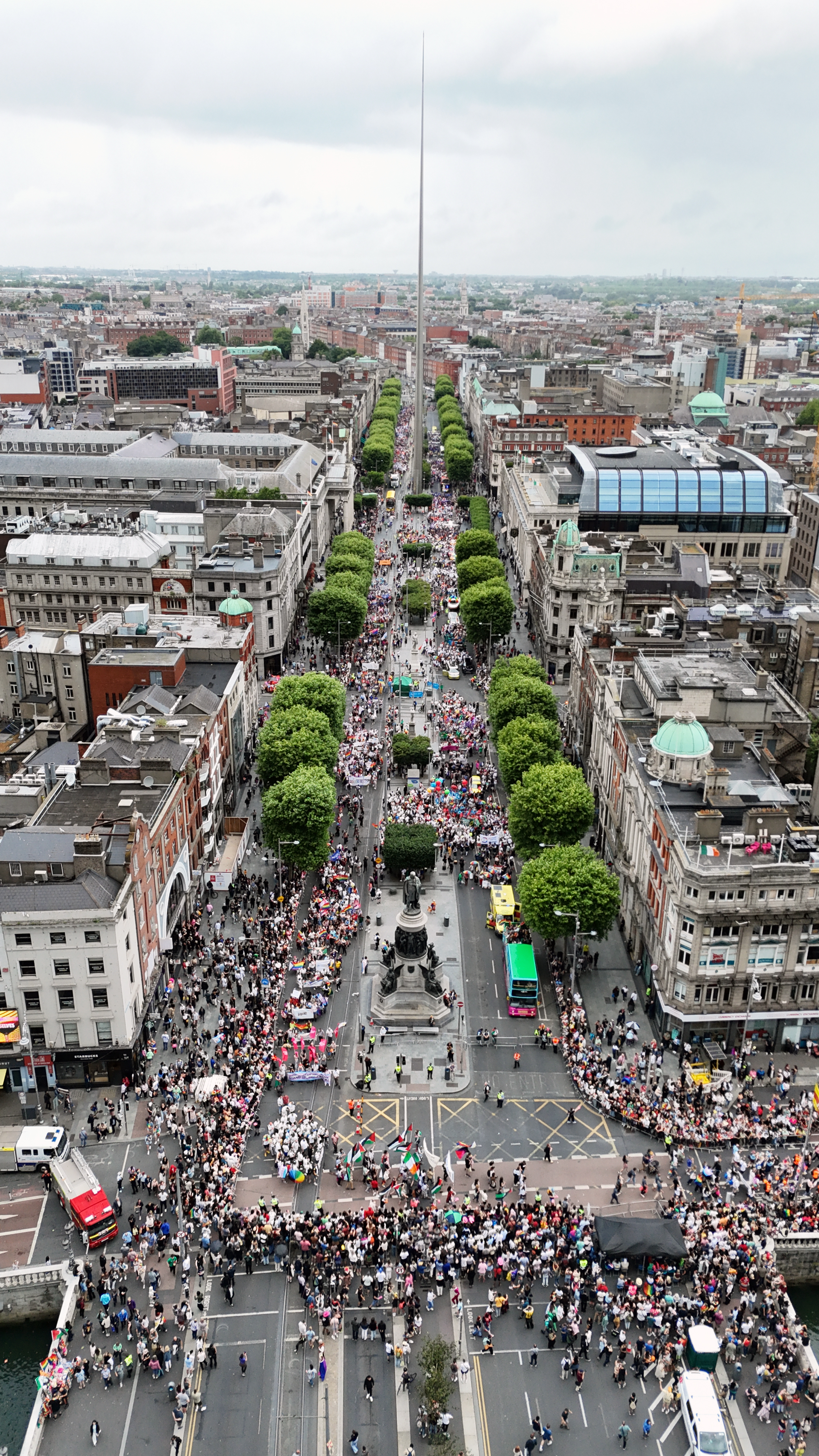
Dublin Pride 2025 at O'Connell Street

The Dublin LGBTQ+ Pride Festival (Irish: Bród Átha Cliath) is an annual series of events which celebrates lesbian, gay, bisexual, transgender, queer (LGBTQ+) life in Dublin, Ireland. It is the largest LGBTQ+ pride festival on the island of Ireland. The festival culminates in a pride parade which is held annually on the last Saturday in June. The event has grown from a one-day event in 1974 to a ten-day festival celebrating LGBT culture in Ireland with an expanded arts, social and cultural content.

The organisation, including the board of directors, is run by volunteers with some paid consultant help. The stated aim of Dublin Pride is to produce a professional LGBTQ+ pride festival and an annual Pride Day including the parade through Dublin city centre, a politically based rally and free entertainment all working for the improvement of LGBTQ+ communities.

== 1970s ==
Following the New York Stonewall Riots of June 1969 and the annual commemorative Pride Parades in the US from 1970 onwards, the first public Gay rights demonstration took place in Dublin on 27 June 1974.

The first Gay Pride Week events were held in June 1979, organised by the National Gay and Lesbian Federation.

== 1980s ==
The first significant Pride Week in Ireland was organised for June 1980.

In March 1983, prior to the first pride parade, a march was held from the city centre of Dublin to Fairview Park in the suburb of Fairview, Dublin, protesting the levels of violence against gay men and women in Ireland. In particular, the march was a reaction to the controversial judgement in the Flynn case, when suspended sentences on charges of manslaughter were given to members of a gang found guilty of the 1982 killing of Declan Flynn, a 31-year-old gay man, in Fairview Park, and the subsequent celebrations by some members of the local community following their release.

The first pride parade was held on Saturday 25 June 1983. The parade was organised by the National LGBT Federation and followed a route through the city centre of Dublin, from St Stephen's Green to the GPO on O'Connell Street, where Cathal Ó Ciarragáin (Dublin Lesbian & Gay Men's Collective), Tonie Walsh (National LGBT Federation) and Joni Crone (Liberation for Irish Lesbians) addressed the rally. Joni Crone rededicated the GPO as the "Gay Person's Organisation".

Although week-long Pride events continued to be held throughout the 1980s, there were no parades from 1985 to 1992 onwards.

== Pride Events, Marches and Parade Grand marshalls ==
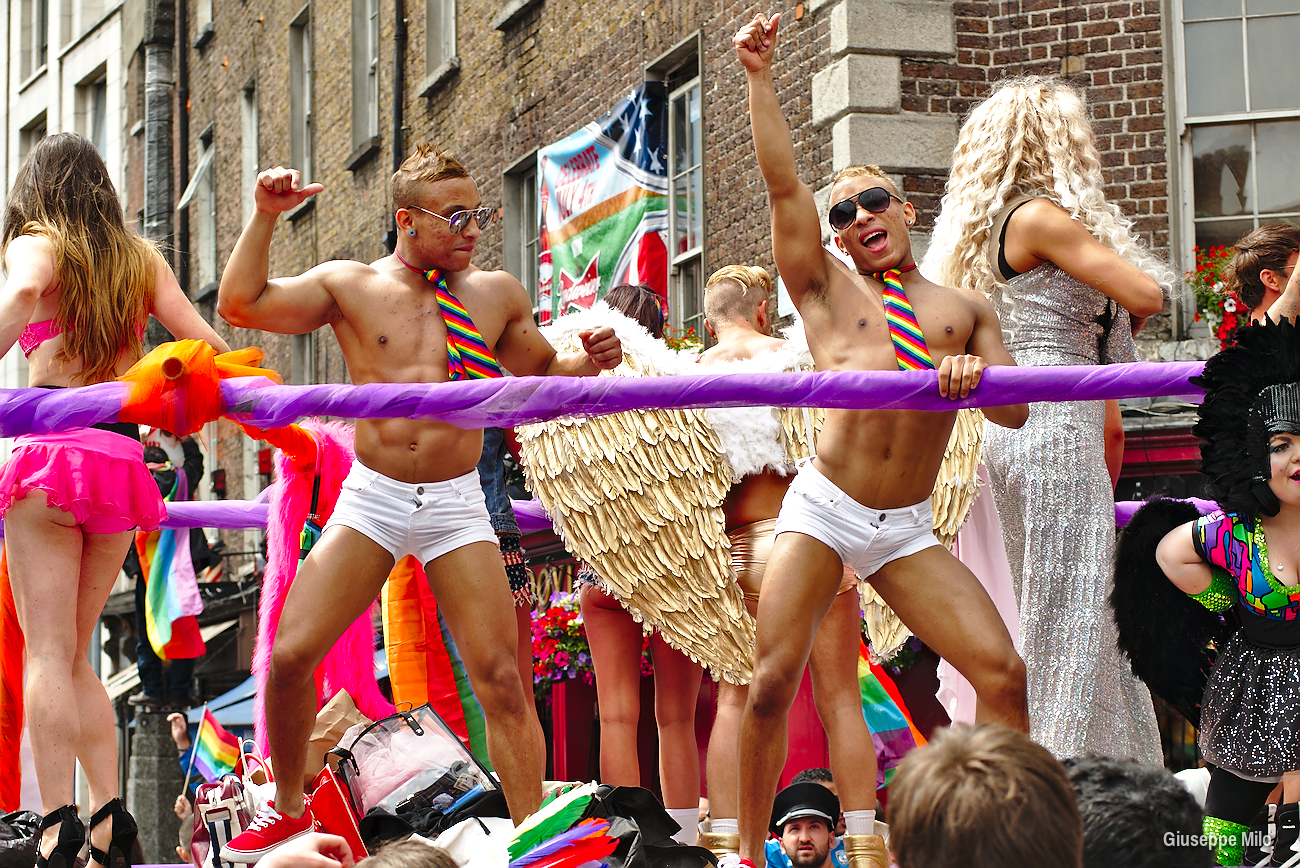
2013 Dublin Pride

=== 1980s ===
The 1980 Pride Week was run by the National LGBT Federation and Liberation for Irish Lesbians to coincide with the opening of the Irish High Court law reform case led by Senator David Norris. Activists shared pink carnations (a symbol of liberation) in the city centre, along with leaflets saying "Gay rights are simply human rights" and explaining the origins of the Stonewall Pride riots.

There were many types of pride marches all the way through the 1980s, though the marches specifically did not take place from 1985 to 1992. This was due to mass emigration in Ireland and the HIV/AIDs epidemic affecting numbers attending.

=== 1990s ===
==== 1992 ====
Dublin Pride March was relaunched for 1992, and was held on Saturday 4 July 1992, and attracted a couple of thousand people.

==== 1993 ====
===== St. Patrick's Day float =====
There was a gay float from the National Gay and Lesbian Federation in the 1993 Saint Patrick's Day in Dublin for the first time. However some rotten fruit was thrown at the parade float by members of the public, the Guards arrested the perpetrator. The organisers won a Recognition Award for the float. There was little objection to the inclusion of the float from the St. Patrick's Day organisers (Dublin Tourism), and most members of the public. An Irish-American contingent disapproved.

===== June Pride =====
On 24 June, during Pride week, the Oireachtas passed legislation to decriminalize homosexuality. Public pride events were held on Saturday 26 June.

==== 1994 ====
The Gay Pride parade took place on Sat 24 June 1994. It was the 20th anniversary of the Irish gay movement and 25th anniversary of the Stonewall riots. It was attended by several hundred people. Marchers chanted "We're gay, we're gay" to the tune of Olé, Olé, Olé. After-parade speeches took place at a stage in East Essex Street, Temple Bar. The Lord Mayor, Thomás Mac Giolla, met representatives in the Mansion House as part of the celebrations

==== 1995: Express Yourself ====
Dublin Pride 1995 was on Saturday 1 July 1995. The then Lord mayor of Dublin, John Gormley, launched "Dublin Pride Week", whose theme was "Express Yourself". The Pride started in the Garden of Remembrance and the party was in The Furnace in Aston Place and were MC'ed by Lilly Savage. It was dedicated to the memory of The Diceman, Thom McGinty.

==== 1996 ====
Dublin Pride 1996 took place on Saturday 29 June 1996.

==== 1997 ====
The 1997 Dublin Pride Parade was on Saturday 28 June 1997, and was attended by over 2,000 people. Organises criticised the Lord Mayor of Dublin, Brendan Lynch, for not meeting them before the march, after finding previous pride parades were "undignified". Dublin Corporation gave a grant of £200 for the parade, and flew eight gay pride flags along the banks of the Liffey. The after parade party was in the Civic Offices.

==== 1998 ====
The 1998 parade took place on Saturday 27 June 1998, and started from the Garden of Remembrance. The second international Dyke March took place on Friday 26 June. The organisers met the Lord Mayor of Dublin. Ireland's first Queer Debs Ball took place in Russell Court Hotel in Harcourt Street on Monday 22 June. The RHA Gallery displayed an exhibition of gay and lesbian gay. A gay ceili took place on Tuesday 23 June in the Russell Court Hotel.

==== 1999 ====
The 1999 Dublin Pride parade took place on Saturday 26 June 1999, and went along O'Connell Street. Stephen Gately, singer in the famous Irish boy band Boyzone, had come out publicly shortly before the parade, and was discussed in the media at the time.

=== 2000s ===
==== 2000 ====
The 2000 Lesbian Gay Bisexual Transgender Pride March took place on Saturday 24 June 2000, and was attended by 6,000 people. Panti MC'ed the after party, which included performances from Shirley Temple Bar. Marching groups included Gloria, OUTHouse, and Greenbow, a gay and lesbian deaf group, which was their third year in the parade. Events raised funds for OUTHouse and HIV Respite Unit at Cherry Orchard Hospital.

==== 2001 ====
The 2001 parade took place on the weekend of 30 June - 1 July and was attended by 6,000 people. Gardai reported no problems. It was at the end of a 2-week Gay Pride Week.

==== 2002 ====
2002 Dublin pride took place on 19 June 2002, and was attended by 6,000 people. The Dublin Lesbian, Gay, Bisexual, Transgender Pride Parade starts on Parnell Square at 2 pm and finishes at the Civic Offices amphitheatre on Wood Quay, where it was followed by the "Pride in the Park" party from 3-6 pm.

==== 2003 ====
The 2003 pride was a celebration of 10 years since the decriminalisation of homosexuality in Ireland, however, attendees were campaigning against the lack of state recognition of same-sex relationships, with the slogan "Legal Ten, Equal When". The parade took place on the weekend of 5–6 July 2003.

==== 2004 ====
The 2004 parade was held on 3 July 2004 and went from Parnell Square to the Civic Offices at Wood Quay for a free party. There was no trouble, except for a little bit of rain, despite recent robberies targeting gay men. About 3,000 people took part, to celebrate the 30th anniversary of Dublin Pride.

==== 2005 ====
The 2005 parade was held on 25 June 2005, and was attended by 10,000 people. BeLonG To, the LGBT youth group, took part, along with the usual music, dancing and celebration. The parade was led by an international group waving flags of various countries.

==== 2006 ====
The 2006 parade was held on 24 June 2006, and featured members of political parties, such as Labour and Sinn Féin. About 6,000 people took part. Panti led the post-parade party in the Civic Offices, which featured performances by Shirley Temple Bar, Alternative Miss Ireland winner Joanna Ryde, and Stellar Sound.

==== 2007: "Pride n' Joy" ====
The theme of the festival was "Pride n' Joy", emphasising the use of celebration as a positive medium to get a message across and to increase the visibility of the Lesbian, Gay, Bisexual, Transgender and Queer (LGBTQ+) community. The grand marshal was Senator David Norris, and it took place on 23 June 2007, with thousands of attendees.

==== 2008: "Always the bridesmaid, never the bride" ====
Grand Marshal – Tonie Walsh

Using the slogan "Always the bridesmaid, never the bride", the 2008 theme highlighted the lack of legal recognition under Irish law of any partnership rights for same-sex couples. The festival was launched by then Irish Minister for the Environment, Heritage and Local Government John Gormley, TD. Gormley recognised that the proposed partnership legislation was "not the full equality we are seeking, but it is a step towards full equality," and "of real practical value in itself and will make a real difference to the daily lives of many people in committed relationships". Performers at the post-rally gathering included Brian Kennedy, Maria McKee and Tara Blaise.

==== 2009: "Pride and Prejudice?" ====
The 2009 festival was held 19–28 June. The theme for 2009 was "Pride and Prejudice?" which celebrated pride in the LGBT communities while questioning the community and society in general on attitudes and prejudices. The festival aimed to celebrate diversity and challenge peoples' perceptions of it. This year introduced Dublin Pride's new Arts and Cultural committee to the festival. Turnout figures were estimated at a record 12,500. Performers at the traditional post-parade show at the Civic Offices, hosted by Panti, included, among others, Black Daisy (Ireland's Eurovision Song Contest 2009 entrant), Michele Ann Kelly, Laura Steele, the Kylie Experience, and Katherine Lynch Senator David Norris was Grand Marshal.

=== 2010s ===
==== 2010: "We Are Family Too" ====
More than 22,000 people marched through Dublin on 26 June 2010. Doctor Lydia Foy was grand marshal. Performers at the Part in the Park at the Civic Offices included DJ Jules in a Lady Gaga tribute act and Niamh Kavanagh, winner of Eurovision Song Contest 1993 who represented Ireland in the Contest again this year. Over 100,000 people participated in the 2010 ten-day Pride festival.

==== 2011: "It's a Human Thing" ====
With a Garda estimate at over 22,000, more people marched through Dublin on 25 June 2011 than ever before. Michael Barron of BelongTo Youth services was Grand Marshal of the parade. Performers at the event in the Civic Offices included Crystal Swing and Niamh Kavanagh, winner of Eurovision Song Contest 1993 returning to perform for a 2nd year in a row. This year seen the introduction of a new event, a Dog Show which was produced as part of the family fun day.

==== 2012: "Show your True Colours" ====
The 2012 festival ran from 22 June until 1 July 2012 with the Parade running on Saturday 30 June. That year saw the festival move from Dublin City Council's Civic Offices on Wood Quay to Merrion Square using three of the four roads around the park and family areas available to use inside the park. It also involved the parade route moving from its traditional route along Dame Street to further south in the city, along Baggot Street to the final destination Event at Merrion Square. The new venue has capacity for up to 15,000 people and space for vendors to sell food and beverages to the public. Panti Bliss was Grand Marshall of the Parade.

==== 2013: "Live, Love, Be Proud" ====
This year marked the 30th anniversary of the parade and the event has grown to be the second largest parade in Ireland, behind the Patrick's Day event. The parade began at the Gardens of Remembrance on Parnell Square and wound its way to Merrion Square.

The parade was disrupted on O’Connell Street shortly after it began this afternoon when a small number of protesters stood in front of the Labour Party bus which was taking part in the parade and stopped it from going any further. The protest, which is believed to have been an anti-property tax and anti-government protest, lasted around ten minutes.

Grand Marshal this year was Anna Grodzka, a transgender MP from the Polish parliament.

==== 2014: "Freedom" ====
Grand Marshal this year was Colm O’Gorman, director of Amnesty International Ireland.

The parade started at the Garden of Remembrance at 1.45pm, making its way by Trinity College and finishing at Merrion Square. This year the Garda band, in uniform, led the parade through the streets of Dublin.

==== 2015: "The Future Is Equal" ====
The parade took place on 27 June 2015.

==== 2016: "Rebel Rebel" ====
The parade took place on 26 June 2016. Max Krzyzanowski was Grand Marshall. It was the first Dublin Pride to take place after the legalization of same-sex marriage in Ireland.

==== 2017: "Find your Inner Hero" ====
The festival ran from 19 to 24 June with the parade taking place on 24 June 2017. That year saw a complete overhaul of the parade route due to extensive works to expand the Luas in the city centre with the parade starting at St. Stephen's Green and finishing at Smithfield Square in North Dublin, the new location for the final destination event. History was made this year when Taoiseach, Leo Varadkar, became the first Irish Leader in office to attend the festival. Moninne Griffith of BeLonG To was Grand Marshall of the parade.

==== 2018: "We Are Family" ====
The festival ran on the final week in June with the parade taking place on 30 June 2018. The theme was "We Are Family" and Sara Philips from Transgender Equality Network of Ireland (TENI) was Grand Marshall.

==== 2019: "Rainbow Revolution" ====
The festival ran from 20 June 2019 to 29 June 2019. The theme was "Rainbow Revolution" to celebrate the 50th anniversary of the Stonewall uprising in New York City that marked the start of the international Pride movement. Will St Leger was Grand Marshall of the festival.

=== 2020s ===
==== 2020: "In This Together" ====
Due to the COVID-19 pandemic, the festival was initially postponed until September 2020, but was later cancelled. Instead, the festival ran digitally online from 18 June 2020 to 28 June 2020. A virtual online parade took place and was led by the Lord Mayor of Dublin Tom Brabazon and frontline workers from across the city. The theme was "In This Together" to act responsibly in the best interests of all communities, to react to changing circumstances and to support the frontline workers. Vanessa O'Connell, an ISL interpreter seen at government press briefings, was Grand Marshall of the festival.

== Controversies ==
In 2023, the organizers of Dublin Pride were accused of "intentionally doctoring photos" to push "propaganda" when they posted an altered image from a 1983 protest, in which the slogan "Trans rights are human rights" was added to a sign carried by a demonstrator. A spokesman for Dublin Pride defended the change, saying that the "practice of altering iconic images for campaigns is a common practice". The altered image was ultimately removed from the Dublin Pride website.

== See also ==
- List of LGBT events
- LGBT rights in the Republic of Ireland
