= Demographics of the Republic of Ireland =

Demographics of Ireland
- Population pyramid of Ireland in 2023
- Population: 5,458,600 (2025)
- Density: 73 per km^{2}
- Growth rate: 8.1%
- Birth rate: 10.5 births/1,000 population (2023 est.)
- Death rate: 6.7 deaths/1,000 population (2023 est.)
- Life expectancy: 80.19 years
  - male: 78 years
  - female: 82.6 years
- Fertility rate: 1.49 children born/woman (2025 est.)
- Infant mortality: 3.85 deaths/1,000 live births
- Net migration rate: 10.9 migrant(s)/1,000 population
- Immigrant share: 23.1% (2024)

Age structure
- 0–14 years: 19.98%
- 15–64 years: 65.26%
- 65 and over: 14.76%

Sex ratio
- Total: 0.99 male/female
- At birth: 1.057 male/female
- Under 15: 1.07 male/female
- 15–64 years: 1.00 male/female
- 65 and over: 0.81 male/female

Nationality
- Nationality: Irish
- Major ethnic: Irish 76.66%
- Minor ethnic: Other European 10.8% Asian 3.3% Black 1.5% Other 1.7%

Language
- Official: Irish, English
- Spoken: Irish sign language, Shelta, Ulster Scots

The demographics of the Republic of Ireland are characterized by a growing and gradually ageing population, with population growth driven by both natural increase and sustained net immigration, the latter becoming increasingly significant in recent decades. As of the 2022 Irish census, the population of the state stood at 5,149,139. More recent estimates from 2025 by the Central Statistics Office indicate the population has continued to expand to over 5.4 million. As of 2025, Eurostat data indicates that approximately 23.3% of the state's resident population is foreign-born.

The country enjoys a high life expectancy of approximately 82.4 years (84.5 for women and 80.4 for men). Fertility rates have fallen to approximately 1.49 children per woman, which is below the replacement level of 2.1, and the national birth rate has declined to roughly 9.9 births per 1,000 population. The population is gradually ageing, with the proportion of older age groups increasing.

Over the last three decades, the Republic of Ireland has transitioned from a largely homogeneous society to a more diverse one. This change has been driven primarily by high levels of sustained immigration from both within and outside the European Union. According to 2022 census data, individuals identifying as White Irish constitute approximately 76.6% of the population, a decline from 87.4% in 2006, followed by Other White backgrounds (10.8%), Asian (3.3%), and Black (1.5%). Population density is relatively low at 73 per km^{2}, but remains unevenly distributed, with a high concentration in the capital city of Dublin and its commuter belt and lower densities in many western and rural counties, reflecting longstanding internal migration from peripheral regions to urban centres.

In terms of religious affiliation, Christianity remains the dominant faith, with Roman Catholicism being the largest single denomination at 69.1%. However, religious observance and self-identification have declined in recent years, alongside a significant rise in those reporting "no religion," who now account for 15.4% of the population. English is the dominant language of daily use, with Irish holding constitutional status as the national and first official language and used as a community language in designated Gaeltacht areas.

== History ==
Historical population
Year	Pop.	±% p.a.
1841	6,528,799	—
1851	5,111,557	−2.42%
1861	4,402,111	−1.48%
1871	4,053,187	−0.82%
1881	3,870,020	−0.46%
1891	3,468,694	−1.09%
1901	3,221,823	−0.74%
1911	3,139,688	−0.26%
1926	2,971,992	−0.37%
1936	2,968,420	−0.01%
1946	2,955,107	−0.04%
1951	2,960,593	+0.04%
1961	2,818,341	−0.49%
1971	2,978,248	+0.55%
1981	3,443,405	+1.46%
1991	3,525,719	+0.24%
2002	3,917,203	+0.96%
2011	4,588,252	+1.77%
2022	5,149,139	+1.05%
Source: CSO 2019

Historical population of Ireland, according to Our World In Data. Ireland's population peaked at roughly 8.5 million right before the start of the Great Famine in 1845

The island of Ireland's population has fluctuated over history. In the 18th and early 19th centuries, Ireland experienced a major population boom as a result of the Agricultural and Industrial Revolutions. In the 50-year period 1790–1840, the population of the island doubled from 4 million to 8 million. At its peak, Ireland's population density was similar to that of England and continental Europe.

This changed dramatically with the Great Famine of the mid-19th century, which led to mass starvation and consequent mass emigration. In the area covering the present day Republic of Ireland, the population reached about 6.5 million in the mid-1840s. Ten years later it was down to 5 million. The population continued a slow decline well into the 20th century, with the Republic recording a low of 2.8 million in the 1961 census.

During the 1960s, the population started to grow once more, although slowly as emigration was still common. In the 1990s the country entered a period of rapid economic growth as a result of the Celtic Tiger Irish economic boom, and the Republic started to receive immigration. Many former Irish emigrants returned home, and Ireland became an attractive destination for immigrants, from other member states in the EU such as Central Europe, but also from outside the EU such as Africa, Asia and elsewhere. With the 2008 onset of the Irish economic and banking crisis, the state's economy suffered, and Ireland has once again been experiencing net emigration of its citizens, but immigration remains high.

In November 2013, Eurostat reported that the Republic had the largest net emigration rate of any member state, at 7.6 emigrants per 1,000 population. However, it had the youngest population of any European Union member state and its population size is predicted to grow for many decades, in contrast with the declining population predicted for most European countries. A report published in 2008 predicted that the population would reach 6.7 million by 2060. The Republic was at the time (mid to late 2000s) experiencing a baby boom, with increasing birth rates and overall fertility rates. Despite this, the total fertility rate is still below replacement.

== Population size ==
=== Chart ===
Total population size of the Republic of Ireland, from 1900: View source data.

== Vital statistics ==
=== Life expectancy ===
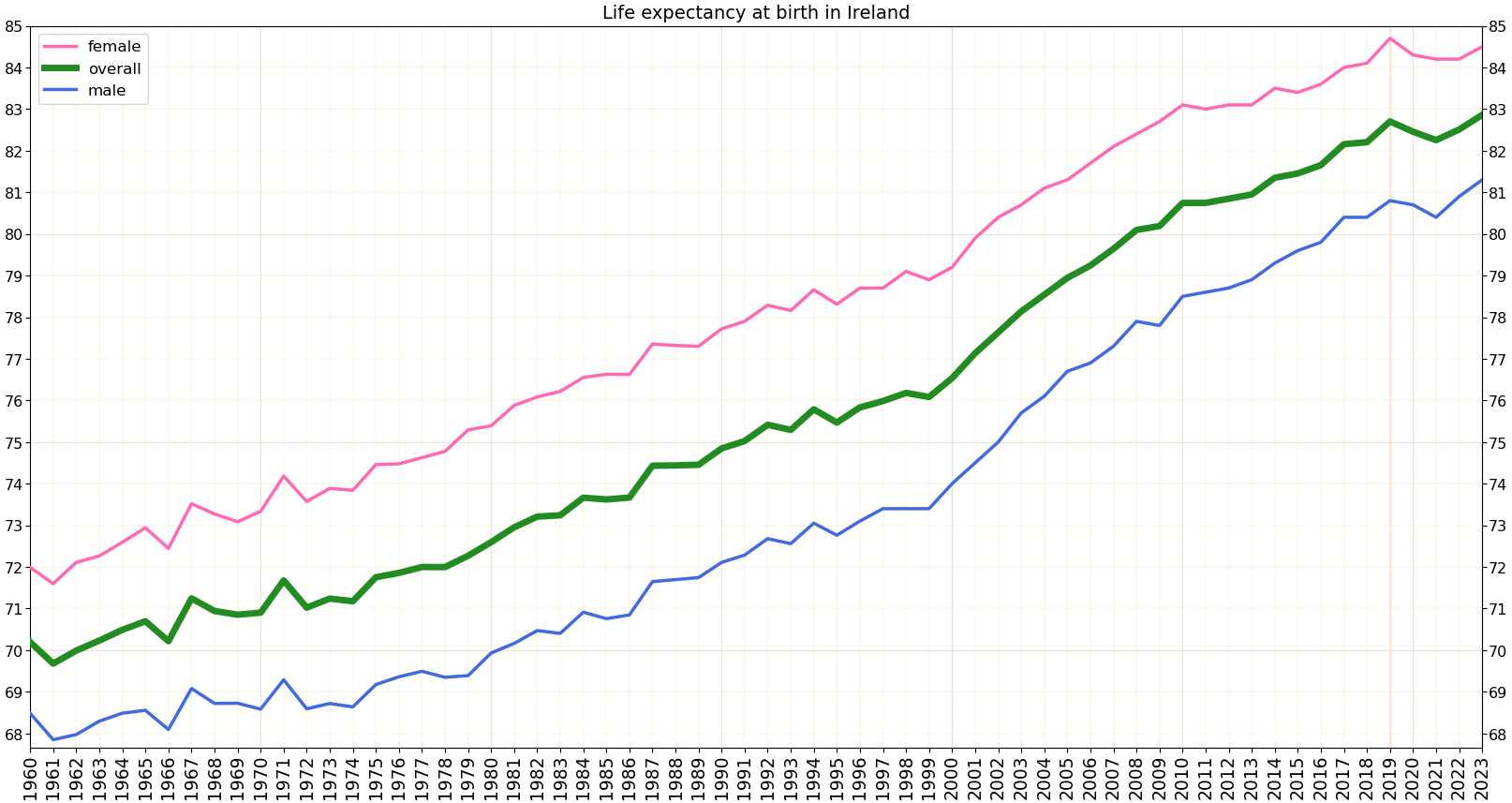
Average life expectancy at birth in the Republic of Ireland according to Our World In Data, 1960–2023: Female (pink), male (blue), average (green)

In 2023, Our World In Data, estimated the average life expectancy in the Republic of Ireland to be 82.4 years (84.5 for females and 80.4 for males). In 2024, Eurostat estimated it to be 83.1 years, and placed it 9th in Europe. The same year, World Bank's Open Knowledge Repository estimated it to be 83.0 years, placing it 23rd in the world.

=== Table ===
Vital statistics for Ireland since 1900
Year	Population (1 April)	Live births	Deaths	Natural change	Crude birth rate (per 1000)	Crude death rate (per 1000)	Natural change (per 1000)	Crude migration (per 1000)	Total fertility rate (Note: In fertility rates, 2.1 and above is a stable population and have been marked blue, 2 and below leads to an aging population and a reducing population.)
1900	3,231,000	70,435			21.8				3.04
1901	3,234,000	70,194	55,165	15,029	21.7	17.1	4.6		2.92
1902	3,205,000	71,156	54,505	16,651	22.2	17.0	5.2		3.08
1903	3,191,000	70,541	54,262	16,279	22.1	17.0	5.1		3.09
1904	3,169,000	72,261	55,997	16,264	22.8	17.7	5.1		3.16
1905	3,160,000	71,427	52,122	19,305	22.6	16.5	6.1		3.13
1906	3,164,000	72,147	51,388	20,759	22.8	16.2	6.6		3.15
1907	3,145,000	70,773	53,580	17,193	22.5	17.0	5.5		3.11
1908	3,147,000	71,439	53,758	17,681	22.7	17.1	5.6		3.12
1909	3,135,000	72,119	52,698	19,421	23.0	16.8	6.2		3.14
1910	3,132,000	71,744	52,318	19,426	22.9	16.7	6.2		3.12
1911	3,129,000	71,351	51,149	20,202	22.8	16.3	6.5		3.07
1912	3,116,000	70,734	50,489	20,245	22.7	16.2	6.5	−9.7	3.10
1913	3,106,000	70,214	52,184	18,030	22.6	16.8	5.8	−8.4	3.09
1914	3,098,000	69,102	49,674	19,428	22.3	16.0	6.3	−16.0	3.05
1915	3,068,000	67,501	53,713	13,788	22.0	17.5	4.5	−3.5	2.99
1916	3,071,000	64,814	50,627	14,187	21.1	16.5	4.6	−4.6	2.87
1917	3,071,000	61,429	51,713	9,716	20.0	16.8	3.2	−3.9	2.71
1918	3,069,000	61,092	53,682	7,410	19.9	17.5	2.4	−5.3	2.73
1919	3,060,000	61,829	55,776	6,044	19.9	18.2	1.7	12.0	2.75
1920	3,102,000	67,015	45,521	21,494	21.6	14.7	6.9	−8.8	3.20
1921	3,096,000	61,010	44,537	16,473	19.7	14.4	5.3	−13.7	2.79
1922	3,070,000	58,849	44,547	14,302	18.5	14.5	4.0	−22.2	2.61
1923	3,014,000	62,417	42,217	19,473	20.5	14.0	6.5	−9.5	2.74
1924	3,005,000	63,402	45,180	18,222	21.1	15.0	6.1	−12.8	2.83
1925	2,985,000	62,069	43,650	18,419	20.8	14.6	6.2	−10.9	2.79
1926	2,971,000	61,176	41,740	19,436	20.6	14.0	6.5	−11.2	2.76
1927	2,957,000	60,054	43,677	16,377	20.3	14.8	5.5	−9.9	2.72
1928	2,944,000	59,176	41,792	17,384	20.1	14.2	5.9	−8.3	2.69
1929	2,937,000	58,280	42,991	15,289	19.8	14.6	5.2	−8.6	2.66
1930	2,927,000	58,353	41,702	16,651	19.9	14.2	5.7	−3.7	2.54
1931	2,933,000	57,086	42,947	14,139	19.5	14.6	4.8	0.7	2.49
1932	2,949,000	56,240	42,984	13,256	19.1	14.6	4.5	−0.1	2.43
1933	2,962,000	57,364	40,539	16,825	19.4	13.7	5.7	−2.7	2.47
1934	2,971,000	57,897	39,083	18,814	19.5	13.2	6.3	−6.3	2.49
1935	2,971,000	58,266	41,543	16,723	19.6	14.0	5.6	−6.9	2.50
1936	2,967,000	58,115	42,586	15,529	19.6	14.4	5.2	−11.6	2.50
1937	2,948,000	56,488	45,086	11,402	19.2	15.3	3.9	−7.6	2.45
1938	2,937,000	56,925	40,041	16,884	19.4	13.6	5.7	−6.7	2.47
1939	2,934,000	56,070	41,717	14,353	19.1	14.2	4.9	3.3	2.43
1940	2,958,000	56,594	41,885	14,709	19.1	14.2	5.0	6.8	2.43
1941	2,993,000	56,780	43,797	12,983	19.0	14.6	4.3	−14.3	2.42
1942	2,963,000	66,117	41,640	24,477	22.3	14.1	8.3	−14.0	2.85
1943	2,946,000	64,375	43,494	20,881	21.9	14.8	7.1	−7.8	2.80
1944	2,944,000	65,425	45,128	20,297	22.2	15.3	6.9	−4.2	2.84
1945	2,952,000	66,861	42,762	24,099	22.6	14.5	8.2	−6.5	2.90
1946	2,957,000	67,922	41,457	26,465	23.0	14.0	8.9	−3.2	2.94
1947	2,974,000	68,978	44,061	24,917	23.2	14.8	8.4	−4.7	2.98
1948	2,985,000	65,930	36,357	29,573	22.1	12.2	9.9	−11.2	2.80
1949	2,981,000	64,153	38,062	26,091	21.5	12.8	8.8	−12.8	2.75
1950	2,969,000	63,565	37,741	25,824	21.4	12.7	8.7	−11.2	2.74
1951	2,961,000	62,878	42,382	20,496	21.2	14.3	6.9	−9.6	2.69
1952	2,953,000	64,631	35,105	29,526	21.9	11.9	10.0	−11.4	2.97
1953	2,949,000	62,558	34,591	27,967	21.2	11.7	9.5	−12.2	2.95
1954	2,941,000	62,534	35,535	26,999	21.3	12.1	9.2	−16.0	3.18
1955	2,921,000	61,622	36,761	24,861	21.1	12.6	8.5	−16.4	3.28
1956	2,898,000	60,740	33,910	26,830	21.0	11.7	9.3	−13.8	3.41
1957	2,885,000	61,242	34,311	26,931	21.2	11.9	9.3	−20.4	3.52
1958	2,853,000	59,510	34,248	25,262	20.9	12.0	8.9	−11.4	3.43
1959	2,846,000	60,188	34,243	25,945	21.1	12.0	9.1	−14.0	3.63
1960	2,832,000	60,735	32,660	28,075	21.4	11.5	9.9	−14.8	3.78
1961	2,818,000	59,825	34,763	25,062	21.2	12.3	8.9	−4.6	3.78
1962	2,830,000	61,782	33,838	27,944	21.8	12.0	9.9	−2.8	3.92
1963	2,850,000	63,246	33,795	29,451	22.2	11.9	10.3	−5.4	4.01
1964	2,864,000	64,072	32,630	31,442	22.4	11.4	11.0	−6.8	4.07
1965	2,876,000	63,525	33,022	30,503	22.1	11.5	10.6	−7.8	4.04
1966	2,884,000	62,215	35,113	27,102	21.6	12.2	9.4	−3.9	3.95
1967	2,900,000	61,307	31,400	29,907	21.1	10.8	10.3	−5.8	3.84
1968	2,913,000	61,004	33,157	27,847	20.9	11.4	9.6	−5.1	3.77
1969	2,926,000	62,912	33,734	29,178	21.5	11.5	10.0	−1.8	3.83
1970	2,950,000	64,382	33,686	30,696	21.8	11.4	10.4	−0.9	3.85
1971	2,978,000	67,551	31,890	35,661	22.7	10.7	3.4	12.0	3.97
1972	3,024,000	68,527	34,381	34,146	22.7	11.4	11.3	4.9	3.93
1973	3,073,000	68,713	34,192	34,521	22.4	11.1	11.2	5.4	3.78
1974	3,124,000	68,907	34,921	33,986	22.1	11.2	10.9	6.1	3.64
1975	3,177,000	67,178	33,173	34,005	21.1	10.4	10.7	5.4	3.43
1976	3,228,000	67,718	34,043	33,675	21.0	10.5	10.4	3.2	3.35
1977	3,272,000	68,892	33,632	35,260	21.1	10.3	10.8	2.0	3.31
1978	3,314,000	70,299	33,794	36,505	21.2	10.2	11.0	5.3	3.27
1979	3,368,000	72,539	33,771	38,768	21.5	10.0	11.5	−1.7	3.26
1980	3,401,000	74,064	33,472	40,592	21.8	9.8	11.9	0.4	3.25
1981	3,443,000	72,158	32,929	39,229	21.0	9.6	11.4	−0.7	3.10
1982	3,480,000	70,843	32,457	38,386	20.4	9.3	11.0	−4.1	2.98
1983	3,504,000	67,117	32,076	35,041	19.2	9.2	10.0	−2.9	2.76
1984	3,529,000	64,062	32,154	31,908	18.2	9.1	9.0	−5.9	2.57
1985	3,540,000	62,388	33,213	29,175	17.6	9.4	8.2	−7.9	2.48
1986	3,541,000	61,620	33,630	27,990	17.4	9.5	7.9	−6.2	2.44
1987	3,547,000	58,433	31,413	27,020	16.5	8.9	7.6	−12.1	2.31
1988	3,531,000	54,600	31,580	23,020	15.5	8.9	6.5	−12.4	2.17
1989	3,510,000	52,018	32,111	19,907	14.8	9.1	5.7	−6.8	2.08
1990	3,506,000	52,954	31,370	21,584	15.1	8.9	6.2	−0.5	2.12
1991	3,526,000	52,718	31,305	21,413	15.0	8.9	6.1	2.1	2.09
1992	3,555,000	51,089	30,931	20,158	14.4	8.7	5.7	−0.4	1.99
1993	3,574,000	49,304	32,148	17,156	13.8	9.0	4.8	−1.4	1.91
1994	3,586,000	48,255	30,948	17,307	13.5	8.6	4.8	−0.6	1.85
1995	3,601,000	48,530	31,494	17,036	13.5	8.7	4.7	2.2	1.86
1996	3,626,000	50,390	31,514	18,876	13.9	8.7	5.2	5.3	1.89
1997	3,664,000	52,311	31,605	20,706	14.3	8.6	5.7	4.9	1.93
1998	3,703,000	53,551	31,352	22,199	14.5	8.5	6.0	4.5	1.95
1999	3,742,000	53,354	31,683	21,671	14.3	8.5	5.8	7.0	1.90
2000	3,790,000	54,789	31,391	23,398	14.5	8.3	6.2	8.8	1.89
2001	3,847,000	57,854	30,212	27,642	15.0	7.9	7.2	11.0	1.96
2002	3,917,000	60,503	29,683	30,820	15.4	7.6	7.8	8.3	1.97
2003	3,980,000	61,529	29,074	32,455	15.5	7.3	8.2	8.1	1.99
2004	4,045,000	61,972	28,665	33,307	15.3	7.1	8.2	13.8	1.96
2005	4,134,000	61,372	28,260	33,112	14.8	6.8	8.0	15.9	1.88
2006	4,233,000	65,425	28,488	36,937	15.4	6.7	8.7	16.3	1.93
2007	4,339,000	71,389	28,117	43,272	16.3	6.4	9.9	9.2	2.04
2008	4,422,000	75,173	28,274	46,899	16.8	6.3	10.5	−2.1	2.09
2009	4,459,000	75,554	28,380	47,174	16.7	6.3	10.4	−7.9	2.10
2010	4,470,000	75,174	27,961	47,213	16.5	6.1	10.4	13.1	2.07
2011	4,575,000	74,033	28,456	45,577	16.2	6.2	10.0	−5.8	2.03
2012	4,594,000	71,674	29,186	42,488	15.6	6.4	9.2	−4.6	1.98
2013	4,615,000	68,954	29,504	39,450	15.0	6.4	8.6	−2.1	1.93
2014	4,645,000	67,295	29,252	38,043	14.6	6.4	8.2	1.1	1.89
2015	4,688,000	65,536	30,127	35,409	14.0	6.4	7.6	3.5	1.86
2016	4,740,000	63,841	30,390	33,451	13.5	6.5	7.2	3.8	1.82
2017	4,792,000	61,824	30,418	31,406	12.9	6.3	6.6	7.0	1.77
2018	4,857,000	61,016	31,116	29,900	12.6	6.4	6.2	7.1	1.75
2019	4,921,500	59,294	31,184	28,110	12.0	6.3	5.7	5.7	1.72
2020	4,977,400	56,818	32,856	23,962	11.2	6.4	4.8	2.1	1.63
2021	5,011,500	60,575	34,844	25,731	11.9	6.9	5.0	12.6	1.72
2022	5,149,139	54,483	35,804	18,679	10.5	6.9	3.6	10.0	1.62
2023	5,281,600	54,426	35,649	19,219	10.4	6.7	3.6	14.7	1.53
2024	5,380,300	54,062	35,173	18,889	10.0	6.5	3.5	14.7	1.49
2025	5,458,600	54,125	35,587	18,538	9.9	6.5	3.4	10.9	1.49
2026	5,525,600								

=== Current vital statistics ===
Period	Live births	Deaths	Natural increase
January—March 2025	13,665	10,230	+3,435
January—March 2026	13,823	10,094	+3,729
Difference	▲ +158 (+1.2%)	▼ –136 (–1.3%)	▲ +294

=== Total fertility rates by region ===
2022
Regions	TFR
Mid-East	1.75
Border	1.74
South-East	1.74
Midland	1.69
Northern and Western	1.66
Mid-West	1.66
Southern	1.61
West	1.60
Ireland	1.54
South-West	1.51
Eastern and Midland	1.47
Dublin	1.32

=== Charts ===
View source data.
View source data.
View source data.

== Ethnic groups ==
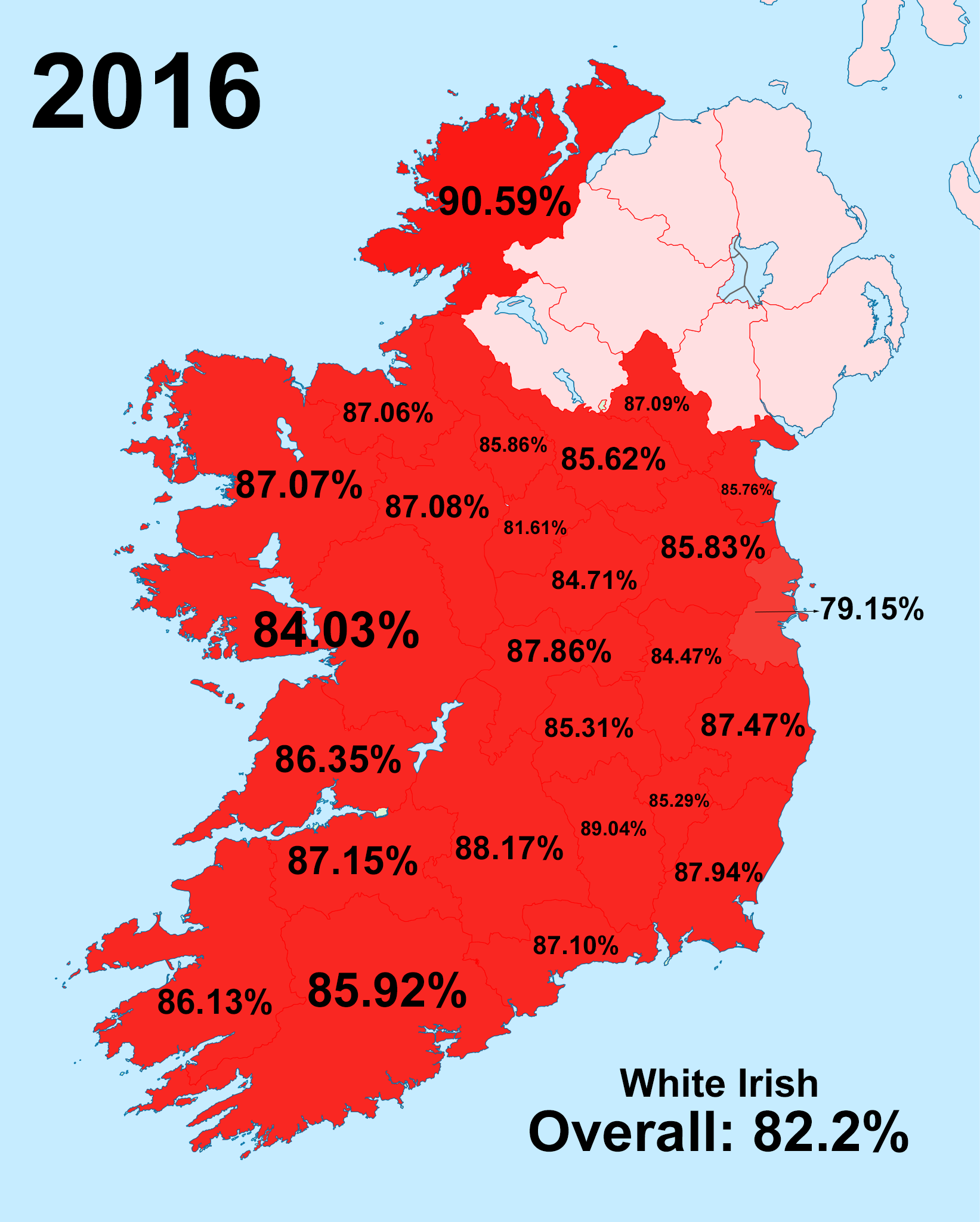
Percentage of White Irish nationally and proportionally by county in Ireland in 2016

Ethnicity of Ireland over time (excluding Non-Stated)

Ethnic Group	Year							
Ethnic Group	2006		2011		2016		2022	
Ethnic Group	Number	%	Number	%	Number	%	Number	%
White: Total	3,956,609	94.84%	4,264,465	94.24%	4,331,940	92.37%	4,444,145	87.33%
White Irish	3,645,199	87.37%	3,821,995	84.46%	3,854,226	82.2%	3,893,056	76.50%
Irish Traveller	22,369	0.54%	29,495	0.65%	30,987	0.7%	32,949	0.65%
White Roma	–	–	–	–	–	–	16,059	0.31%
Other White	289,041	6.93%	412,975	9.13%	446,727	9.5%	502,081	9.87%
Asian: Total	52,345	1.25%	84,690	1.87%	98,720	2.10%	186,321	3.64%
Chinese	16,533	0.40%	17,832	0.39%	19,447	0.4%	26,828	0.50%
Indian/Pakistani/Bangladeshi	–	–	–	–	–	–	94,434	1.86%
Arab	–	–	–	–	–	–	20,115	0.40%
Other Asian	35,812	0.86%	66,858	1.48%	79,273	1.7%	44,944	0.88%
Black: Total	44,318	1.06%	65,078	1.44%	64,639	1.38%	76,245	1.50%
Black Irish and Black African	40,525	0.97%	58,697	1.30%	57,850	1.24%	67,547	1.32%
Other Black	3,793	0.09%	6,381	0.14%	6,789	0.14%	8,699	0.17%
Other including Mixed	–	–	–	–	–	–	64,992	1.28%
Not Stated	118,741	2.85%	111,048	2.45%	194,622	3.98%	313,176	6.16%
Total:	4,172,013	100%	4,525,281	100%	4,689,921	100%	5,084,879	100%

Population pyramids of ethnic groups within Ireland in 2022

White Irish

White Other

Asian: Indian/Pakistani/Bangladeshi

Asian: Chinese

Asian: Other

Black: Africans

Black: Other

Not Stated

== Immigration ==
Ireland's immigration history (and of one of a multi-ethnic society) is most of that of a country of emigration, remaining largely white for the vast majority of 20th century history. However, there were small migrant communities resident in Ireland throughout this period, such as African students, who numbered over 1,000 in the 1960s and 1970s.

However, from the 1990s, with the rise of the 'Celtic Tiger', the nation shifted to one of a net receiver of immigration at a rapid pace, changing from one of the most 'homogeneous countries in the EU, to a country with a rate of change almost unparalleled in speed and scale'. The Celtic Tiger economic boom saw a large expansion of the labour market, which contributed to the large increase of immigration towards the country, with the additional enlargement of the European Union in 2004 and the further 2007 enlargement contributing to increased levels of immigration.

Additionally, asylum seekers rose dramatically as well: from 364 in 1994 to 11,634 in 2002, before falling off towards the end of the decade.

- Net migration rate: 6.8 migrant(s)/1,000 population (2023 est.)
- Country comparison to the world: 13th

=== Nationalities ===
Ireland contains several immigrant communities, especially in Dublin and other cities across the country. The largest immigrant groups, with over 10,000 people, being Poles, British, Indians, Romanians, Lithuanians, Brazilians, Italians, Latvians, Spaniards, French, Croats, Americans, Chinese, Germans and Ukrainians.

Citizenship (Note: The 2022 Irish Census has swapped out the question regarding nationality with one regarding citizenship. Therefore the table states citizenship, as that is the data that the 2022 census has in comparison to the 2016 data.)	2016		2022	
Citizenship	Number	%	Number	%
Total Irish	4,082,513	87%	4,283,490	84%
Irish	3,977,729	85%	4,112,893	81%
Dual Irish	104,784	2%	170,597	3%
None/Other	607,408	13%	801,389	15%
Non-Irish	535,475	11%	631,785	12%
None/not stated	71,933	2%	169,604	3%
Total	4,689,921	100%	5,084,879	100%

Persons usually resident, by nationality (Note: These statistics only show non-Irish citizens of the below countries that do not also have Irish citizenship. Individuals which have acquired Irish nationality are not counted under their nation's figures.)
Nationality	Population (2022)
(European Union) Poland	93,680
United Kingdom	83,347
India	45,449
(European Union) Romania	43,323
(European Union) Lithuania	31,177
Brazil	27,338
(European Union) Italy	18,319
(European Union) Latvia	18,300
(European Union) Spain	17,953
(European Union) France	13,893
(European Union) Croatia	13,649
United States	13,412
China	13,050
(European Union) Germany	12,390
Ukraine	11,791
(European Union) Hungary	9,336
Pakistan	9,309
(European Union) Slovakia	8,600
(European Union) Hungary	8,503
Nigeria	8,368
(European Union) Portugal	8,310
South Africa	8,250
Philippines	7,736
(European Union) Netherlands	4,670
(European Union) Czech Republic	4,530
(European Union) Bulgaria	3,994
Canada	3,528
Australia	3,481
Malaysia	3,407
Syria	3,267
Moldova	3,119

==== Nationality of mothers ====
Of the 54,125 births in 2025, there were 37,982 babies (70.2%) born to mothers of Irish nationality compared to 45,381 (78%) in 2021. There were 6.1% of births to mothers of EU15 to EU27 nationality, 1.9% of mothers were of UK nationality, and 2.5% were of EU14 nationality (excluding Ireland). Mothers of nationalities other than Ireland, UK and the EU accounted for 18.5% of total births registered. There were 0.8% of mothers where the nationality was not stated.

=== Migration data for Ireland, 1987–present ===
Ireland Net Migration (thousands)
Year	Immigrants	Emigrants	Net Migration
1987	17.2	40.2	−23.0
1988	19.2	61.1	−41.9
1989	26.7	70.6	−43.9
1990	33.3	56.3	−22.9
1991	33.3	35.3	−2.0
1992	40.7	33.4	7.4
1993	34.7	35.1	−0.4
1994	30.1	34.8	−4.7
1995	31.2	33.1	−1.9
1996	39.2	31.2	8.0
1997	44.5	25.3	19.2
1998	46.0	28.6	17.4
1999	48.9	31.5	17.3
2000	52.6	26.6	26.0
2001	59.0	26.2	32.8
2002	66.9	25.6	41.3
2003	60.0	29.3	30.7
2004	58.5	26.5	32.0
2005	84.6	29.4	55.1
2006	107.8	36.0	71.8
2007	151.1	46.3	104.8
2008	113.5	49.2	64.3
2009	73.7	72.0	1.6
2010	41.8	69.2	−27.5
2011	53.3	80.6	−27.4
2012	57.3	83.0	−25.7
2013	62.7	81.3	−18.7
2014	66.5	75.0	−8.5
2015	75.9	70.0	5.9
2016	82.3	66.2	16.2
2017	95.3	56.1	39.2
2018	96.0	51.6	44.4
2019	97.1	53.1	44.0
2020	95.6	50.9	44.7
2021	74.1	52.3	21.8
2022	107.8	56.1	51.7
2023	141.6	64.0	77.7
2024	149.2	69.9	79.3
2025	125.3	65.6	59.7

=== Country of birth ===
In 2022, 20% of the usually resident population in Ireland were born elsewhere, an increase of 3% since 2016. This represented 1,017,437 people, an increase of 207,031 from six years previously.

Persons usually resident, by country of birth
Country	1986	1991	1996	2002	2006	2011	2016	2022
England and Wales	128,668	126,487	139,330	182,624	200,488	212,296	203,188	210,434
(European Union) Poland	–	–	–	2,167	62,495	115,193	115,161	106,142
Northern Ireland	36,538	35,986	39,567	49,928	49,171	58,470	57,389	61,750
India	–	–	–	3,402	9,192	17,856	20,969	56,624
(European Union) Romania	–	–	–	5,838	8,492	17,995	28,702	42,460
Brazil	–	–	–	1,232	4,666	9,298	15,796	39,556
(European Union) Lithuania	–	–	–	2,120	24,611	34,847	33,344	34,242
United States	15,350	14,533	15,619	21,541	24,643	27,762	28,650	34,236
Nigeria	–	–	–	9,225	16,327	19,780	16,569	20,559
(European Union) Latvia	–	–	–	2,281	13,854	19,989	18,991	20,330
Philippines	–	–	–	4,086	9,427	13,833	14,725	19,846
(European Union) Spain	1,113	1,801	2,104	4,632	6,122	7,003	11,809	18,356
Scotland	12,586	11,378	11,751	15,963	16,488	17,871	16,644	16,869
China	–	–	–	5,669	11,022	11,458	11,262	16,425
Moldova	–	–	–	1,032	2,233	3,421	6,472	16,155
South Africa	–	–	–	6,260	7,576	8,116	8,085	15,886
(European Union) Italy	1,314	1,507	1,844	3,705	5,705	7,146	10,913	15,689
Ukraine	–	–	–	1,485	3,367	4,123	4,624	15,678
Pakistan	–	–	–	3,391	5,757	8,329	12,891	15,185
(European Union) France	2,460	4,512	3,593	6,794	9,145	10,081	11,924	14,821
(European Union) Germany	3,853	5,792	6,343	8,770	11,544	12,980	12,964	14,789
(European Union) Croatia	–	–	–	–	–	980	5,202	12,743
(European Union) Slovakia	–	–	–	–	8,129	9,537	9,443	10,695
Australia	–	–	–	6,107	6,478	5,964	6,748	9,947
(European Union) Hungary	–	–	–	3,285	8,129	7,413	8,648	8,634
Russia	–	–	–	2,556	4,511	5,936	6,414	7,900
Canada	–	–	–	4,081	4,492	4,809	5,314	7,122
(European Union) Portugal	124	147	192	590	1,496	2,246	3,866	5,987
(European Union) Netherlands	1,888	1,985	2,490	3,512	4,211	4,499	4,729	5,376
Zimbabwe	–	–	–	1,462	2,230	2,790	2,811	5,246
(European Union) Czech Republic	–	–	–	–	5,230	5,494	4,936	5,092
Malaysia	–	–	–	2,195	3,340	3,782	4,016	4,864
(European Union) Bulgaria	–	–	–	–	–	1,783	2,911	4,585
Bangladesh	–	–	–	–	1,924	2,920	3,410	4,388
Turkey	–	–	–	–	–	1,301	1,607	4,086
Syria	–	–	–	–	–	308	920	3,922
Mexico	–	–	–	–	–	889	1,476	3,364

=== Support and opposition ===
Migrants are supported/represented by the Immigrant Council of Ireland, Irish Refugee Council, Movement of Asylum Seekers in Ireland, Nasc and the state's Irish Naturalisation and Immigration Service. They are managed by the International Protection Accommodation Service under the Department of Children, Equality, Disability, Integration and Youth (DCEDIY) as well being policed by the Garda National Immigration Bureau.

Some minor parties have voiced opposition to immigration in the country and its capability to continue to let refugees in; that "Ireland is full". They include the National Party and the Irish Freedom Party. In May 2023, a Red C/The Business Post poll found that 75% of people thought that Ireland is taking in too many refugees.

The DCEDIY projected a shortfall of 15,000 beds for refugees in December 2022 and admitted that there was mounting pressure to house 65,000 people.

Approximately 7,400 refugee adults and children were projected to be living in 38 "direct provision" centres across 17 counties in Ireland by the end of April 2020. The government of Ireland have said that they project to end direct provision by 2024 and are looking towards alternative forms of accommodation.

== Religion ==
Religions in Ireland (2022)
1. Catholicism (69.1%)
2. Protestantism (4.60%)
3. Eastern Orthodoxy (2.00%)
4. Hinduism (0.60%)
5. Islam (1.60%)
6. No religion or atheist (15.4%)
7. Not stated (6.70%)

Ireland is a predominantly Christian country. The majority are Catholic; however, the number of people who declare themselves Catholic has been declining in recent years. Irreligion has increased since 2016 with 14% declaring "no religion" in 2022, meaning this is the second largest religious affiliation in Ireland. Immigration has also brought other faiths, with Islam at 1.7%, or over 83,000 people. As well as Hinduism, with 33,043 Hindus in the state. There are 2,193 members of the Jewish community in Ireland, according to the 2022 Census.

== Languages ==
English is the most commonly used language, with 84% of the population calling it their mother tongue. Irish is the first official language of the state, with 11% calling it their mother tongue. Irish is the main language of the Gaeltacht regions, where 102,973 people lived as of 2022. The main sign language used is Irish Sign Language.

Population of Ireland aged 3 or over by Irish usage
Frequency of Irish usage amongst Irish speakers		2002		2006		2011		2016		2022	
Frequency of Irish usage amongst Irish speakers		Number	% Stated	Number	% Stated	Number	% Stated	Number	% Stated	Number	% Stated
Speaks Irish	Daily, Outside Education System	–	–	72,148	1.82	77,185	1.80	73,803	1.67	71,968	1.55
Speaks Irish	Daily, Total	339,541	9.26	525,355	13.28	596,366	13.92	632,411	14.28	625,933	13.51
Speaks Irish	Total	1,079,880	29.44	1,214,313	30.69	1,320,244	30.83	1,330,419	30.04	1,401,110	30.24
Never speaks Irish		459,657	12.53	415,479	10.50	438,782	10.25	418,420	9.45	472,887	10.21
Frequency unknown		31,357	0.85	26,998	0.68	15,411	0.35	12,581	0.28	45,385	0.98
Ability in Irish		Number	% Stated	Number	% Stated	Number	% Stated	Number	% Stated	Number	% Stated
Irish speakers		1,570,894	42.83	1,656,790	41.87	1,774,437	41.44	1,761,420	39.77	1,873,997	40.45
Non Irish-speakers		2,097,263	57.17	2,300,174	58.13	2,507,312	58.56	2,667,945	60.23	2,759,028	59.55
Total stated		3,668,157	97.79	3,956,964	97.51	4,281,749	97.97	4,429,365	96.94	4,633,025	93.11
Not stated		82,838	2.21	100,682	2.49	88,882	2.03	139,896	3.06	342,688	6.89
Total		3,750,995		4,057,646		4,370,631		4,569,261		4,975,713	

== Employment and income ==
For May 2025 the seasonally adjusted unemployment rate was:

4.0% overall, down from a 4.1% in April 2025., and an annual basis, down from 4.4% in May 2024

3.9% for males, down from 4.0% in April 2025, and down from 4.4% in May 2024.

4.1% for females, down from 4.2% in April 2025, and down from 4.4% in May 2024.

10.9% for persons aged 15–24 years (youth unemployment rate) from a revised rate of 11.2% in April 2025.

Up to 3.1% for persons aged 25–74 years from 3.0% in April 2025.

The median household disposable income in 2024 was €58,922, an increase of €3,773 (+6.8%) from the previous year. Disposable household income is gross household income less total tax, social insurance contributions, pension contributions and inter-household transfers paid.

== See also ==
- Demographics of Northern Ireland
- 2011 census of Ireland
- 2016 census of Ireland
- Historical population of Ireland
- Irish diaspora
- Stamp 4

Groups:

- Americans in Ireland
- Brazilians in Ireland
- Black people in Ireland
- Chinese people in Ireland
- Lithuanians in Ireland
- Polish minority in Ireland
- Romani people in Ireland
- South Asians in Ireland
- Turks in Ireland
