= Irish anti-immigration protests =

- Part of the opposition to immigration in the Republic of Ireland
- Date: 6 November 2022 – present
- Location: Clare; Cork; Dublin; Galway; Kildare; Leitrim; Waterford; Westmeath; Wexford; Wicklow
- Caused by: Planning and establishment of transitional shelters for asylum seekers across the Republic of Ireland by the Department of Children, Equality, Disability, Integration and Youth; 2022 Ukrainian refugee crisis in Ireland; Dublin homelessness crisis
- Goals: Moving asylum seekers internally to combat local overpopulation or deporting them from the country
- Methods: Traffic obstruction at roads and ports; Motorcade protests; Assaults on police; Arson; Intimidation and threats to immigrants and politicians
- Result: National attention
- Concessions: Multiple meetings with relevant ministers; Plans for a communications strategy

Parties
Department of Children, Equality, Disability, Integration and Youth: Ministers: Roderic O'Gorman (Note: Until 23 January 2025, following the 2024 Dail elections.); Norma Foley (Note: Since 23 January 2025, following the 2024 Dail elections.); Minister of State: Joe O'Brien (Note: Until 2025); Hildegarde Naughton (Note: 2025.); Emer Higgins (Note: since 2025.)	Irish Freedom Party; Ireland First; National Party; Local protest groups: East Wall Protest Committee; Mullingar says No!; Rosslare Harbour Concerned Residents
- Garda Síochána: Public Order Unit; Special Detective Unit
- Civilian counter-protesters: Le Chéile; Fermoy and Mallow Against Division

Arrests, injuries and damages
- Injuries: At least two (one demonstrator hit by a vehicle during a protest, and a security guard attacked by anti-immigration protestors during the Coolock riots)
- Arrested: 2023: ≥ 30 (excluding Dublin riot); 2022: ≥ 2
- Damage: Multiple buildings burned down (suspected arson)
- Charged: ≥ 5 (in Drimnagh, Finglas, inner city Dublin, and Athy)

Protests at several locations in Ireland started in early November 2022 after the development of sites in various parts of the country as asylum seeker shelters by the Department of Children, Equality, Disability, Integration and Youth (DCEDIY), as it attempted to accommodate the influx of 65,000 asylum seekers during 2022. Protests were held in East Wall, Ballymun, Drimnagh and elsewhere in Dublin; Fermoy and Mallow in County Cork; Kill, County Kildare; Lismore, County Waterford; Mullingar, County Westmeath; Inch, County Clare; and Rosslare Harbour, County Wexford.

The protests, which the Garda Síochána say numbered 307 in 2022 and at least a further 169 as of August 2023, raised concerns over the lack of provision of prior information to local residents and concerns around the impact that local population growth, due to accommodating asylum seekers, had on facilities and housing. Protesters have questioned the lack of women and children in some accommodation centres where there have been a high proportion of single males. Some protesters have also been influenced by rumours purporting asylum seekers carrying out violent or threatening acts that have been shown to be often baseless. Additionally, Gardaí stated in March 2023 that there has not been an increase in crime as a result of international protection applicants nor a need for increased presence near the shelters. Garda Assistant Commissioner Angela Willis reported that both attendance and frequency of protests "appeared to reach a peak" in March 2023.

The presence of anti-immigrant protesters, members of far-right groups and violent criminals at these protests has been highlighted online and in the mainstream media, and 17 people have been arrested at the protests in 2023 as of August. Some far-right protesters have been labelled as "hijackers" of the protests' true purpose and some demonstrations have been described as misrepresentative of local sentiment. Politicians have commented on the protests including Leo Varadkar (the Taoiseach at the time) who said said locals cannot veto "the kind of people who get to live in their area", and the topic has been raised in Seanad Éireann and in a joint committee with Dáil Éireann. Plans for better consultation with locals have been put in place and government handling has been both defended and criticised within the Oireachtas.

== Background ==
Protests at several locations in the north and west of the Republic of Ireland started in November 2018 against the placement of refugees in direct provision centres in rural locations. Proposed refugee shelters were firebombed in Moville and Roosky, as was politician Martin Kenny's car in Ballinamore after he spoke in defence of refugees, and demonstrations were held in Roosky, Oughterard, Ballinamore, Carrickmacross and Achill. What was the Minister of Justice and Equality Charlie Flanagan and others claimed the 25 November 2018 fire at a hotel-turned-direct provision centre a week before 100 asylum seekers were going to move in was arson.

Anti-immigrant members of far-right groups were involved in some of the protests. Politicians and others took different positions on the protests, with some supporting them and others criticising them.

In February 2022, a major international refugee crisis occurred following the 2022 Russian invasion of Ukraine, with millions of Ukrainians displaced. Alongside almost all other European countries, Ireland accepted Ukrainian refugees fleeing the war; by mid-November 2022 over 58,000 Ukrainians had come to Ireland. November 2022 was also the beginning of the protests against the development of sites as temporary refugee shelters by the DCEDIY. Since the mid-2010s, Ireland has been experiencing a housing and accommodation crisis; the simultaneous overlap of both crises exacerbated each other; the failure to provide housing meant that refugees could not expect to find much accommodation in Ireland, and the arrival of thousands of refugees in Ireland meant further strains on housing and accommodation demands that were already peaking. The crises of accommodation were in spite of over 130,000 empty homes in Ireland in 2022.

== Chronology ==
From late 2022, a wave of anti-immigration protests emerged across Ireland, triggered by the government's use of hotels, convents, former office buildings and other vacant properties to house asylum seekers and refugees. A recurring grievance across virtually all incidents was the perceived lack of prior consultation with local communities. The protests were often accompanied by misinformation spread on social media, and were frequently exploited by far-right organisations including the National Party, the Irish Freedom Party and Ireland First, who used them to promote Euroscepticism, extreme Irish nationalism and, in some cases, pro-Russian ideology.

The first major flashpoint came in November 2022 in East Wall, Dublin, where protests erupted over the conversion of the Two Gateway Building, a former ESB Group office block, into an emergency accommodation centre for around 100 male asylum seekers. The protests were organised by the "East Wall Protest Committee", led by solicitor and former Workers' Party member Malachy Steenson. Protesters blocked the Dublin Port Tunnel on multiple occasions and later disrupted access to the East-Link toll bridge, Samuel Beckett Bridge and Busáras. Far-right figures such as Hermann Kelly of the Irish Freedom Party used the protests to attack a range of unrelated culture-war targets. Similar protests took place in Fermoy, County Cork in the same period, where Derek Blighe of Ireland First addressed a crowd of roughly 70 people; a counter-demonstration of up to 300 people was subsequently organised by Fermoy and Mallow Against Racism. Protests also occurred in Kill, County Kildare, where a fire broke out at the earmarked equestrian centre shortly after demonstrations, and an anti-immigrant motorcade protest of between 100 and 200 vehicles was later organised.

=== Escalation in 2023 ===
Through 2023, the pattern of protest intensified and, in several cases, crossed into criminality. In January of that year, protesters assembled in Drimnagh based on false information that a school was being permanently converted to house refugees, leading to one arrest. In Ballymun, protesters blocked the M50 using sulkies and demonstrations took place outside a Travelodge housing 221 international protection seekers. In Ashtown, a migrant tent camp on the banks of the River Tolka was attacked by a group of men with dogs and a baseball bat; a migrant solidarity rally of around 200 people followed. In Finglas, a protest of around 200 people was accompanied by the Garda Public Order Unit in riot gear, and a local far-right activist, Graham Carey, was subsequently arrested and charged with incitement to hatred after posting threats online. The attacks in both Finglas and Ashtown were motivated by false rumours about migrant crime.

Attacks on physical property also became increasingly common. A 19th-century building on Sherrard Street in Dublin was set ablaze in January 2023 following rumours it would house refugees, and a fire broke out at the former Crown Paint factory site in Coolock during protests in July 2024. On Upper Sandwith Street in February 2023, an anti-immigration group attacked a refugee camp and set fire to tents, leading to one arrest on arson charges. A similar incident occurred in Ringsend in late December 2023, where a suspected arson attack destroyed the former Shipwright pub, which had been earmarked for homeless families. Arson attacks were also recorded in Brittas, County Dublin, Tallaght, and at a hotel in Rosscahill, Oughterard, County Galway, where four people were eventually arrested.

In September 2023, a large and aggressive demonstration was held at Leinster House, with around 200 protesters blocking TDs and Oireachtas staff from entering or leaving. A mock gallows with an effigy and portraits of politicians, including Taoiseach Leo Varadkar and Roderic O'Gorman, was erected. Bottles of urine were alleged to have been thrown at Gardaí, thirteen people were arrested, and the Tánaiste, Micheál Martin, described the conduct of protesters as "fascist-like". Beyond Dublin, significant protests took place in Mullingar at Columb Barracks, in County Clare where protesters blockaded a hotel at Inch and allegedly boarded a bus to conduct a headcount of asylum seekers, and in Rosslare Harbour, where around 1,000 people attended a blockade affecting ferry traffic at Rosslare Europort.

=== November 2023 Dublin riot ===
On the evening of 23 November 2023, a riot took place in Dublin, Ireland, which involved multiple incidents of vandalism, arson, and looting in the city centre as well as assaults on Gardaí (Irish police) and members of the public. Gardaí described the riot as the most violent in modern Dublin history, far surpassing the 2006 riots. Initial estimates by Dublin City Council suggested that the damage could cost up to €20 million, while then-Taoiseach, Leo Varadkar, stated that it could cost "tens of millions".

The riot was triggered by a man stabbing three young children and a care assistant at around 1:30 p.m. GMT that day outside a primary school in Parnell Square East, Dublin. A five-year-old girl was critically injured and the care assistant—who had tried to shield the children with her own body—was seriously injured. In the hours following the stabbings, far-right activists used social media and messaging apps to spread public anger over immigration. At a later point, the suspect was identified as Riad Bouchaker, originally from Algeria. Bouchaker was charged with multiple counts of attempted murder and assault and currently faces trial at the Central Criminal Court. The five-year-old girl was discharged from hospital in August 2024.

By 5 p.m., a crowd of 100 to 200 anti-immigrant demonstrators had gathered at Parnell Square. The unrest began at around 6 p.m. when demonstrators began throwing fireworks, flares and bottles at the Gardaí who were maintaining a cordon around the crime scene. Shortly before 7 p.m., a nearby Garda car was set on fire. Rioting progressed to the adjacent O'Connell Street, Dublin's main thoroughfare, and also spread to Capel Street and Parliament Street. At its peak, the rioting crowd was estimated at 500 people. Several Dublin Bus vehicles, Garda vehicles and a Luas tram were damaged or destroyed by arson and vandalism, and multiple shops were looted. In response, around 400 Gardaí were dispatched, including the largest deployment of Gardaí armed with riot gear in Ireland's history. Approximately 60 Gardaí were assaulted during the riot, three of whom sustained serious injuries. By 10 p.m., the rioters had been dispersed, with 34 arrests made that evening and further arrests made over subsequent days.

Following the riot, the Garda Commissioner, Drew Harris, blamed the events on a "lunatic, hooligan faction driven by a far-right ideology". Other public figures criticised policing in Dublin city and called for the resignations of Harris and the Minister for Justice, Helen McEntee. The minister subsequently survived a vote of no confidence in Dáil Éireann. The government implemented additional riot-prevention measures after the incident, borrowing water cannons from the Police Service of Northern Ireland, passing new laws enabling the use of police body cameras, and announcing plans to expand the use of hand-held video cameras, tasers, and pepper spray.

=== Later incidents ===
Protests continued into 2024 and 2025. The Coolock protests, which began in March 2024 at the site of the former Crown Paint factory, became among the most prolonged and violent, with multiple arson attacks, petrol bombs and bricks thrown at Gardaí and firefighters, improvised incendiary devices seized nearby, and 21 people arrested over one weekend in July 2024. Taoiseach Simon Harris described the scenes as "reprehensible".

In April 2025, a "National Protest" march organised by Malachy Steenson drew over 10,000 people from the Garden of Remembrance to the Custom House, endorsed publicly by Conor McGregor and notable for the mass display of Irish tricolour flags. In October 2025, a riot broke out outside the Citywest IPAS Centre in Saggart, triggered by the alleged rape of a 10-year-old girl by a resident of the centre; up to 2,000 demonstrators gathered before unrest broke out, with Gardaí attacked using fireworks, rocks and bottles, a Garda vehicle set alight, and attempts made to breach a police cordon using horse-drawn sulkies. Days later, on 31 October 2025, an IPAS centre in Drogheda was deliberately set alight using an accelerant and fireworks, with four children rescued from the top floor of the building.

== Other issues raised ==
=== Lack of accommodation ===
The government's failure to find accommodation for asylum seekers has been criticised by the Irish Human Rights and Equality Commission, the latter saying that Ireland was in breach of their international obligations, specifically referring to an EU directive. It has also been raised by protesters to support the Ireland is Full movement, but Minister O'Gorman of the DCEDIY said the shortage is "short-term" and that "as a system, as a State, we can continue to fulfill our legal obligations and our moral obligations".

=== Gardaí handling ===
The Policing Authority condemned unlawful escalations at the protests and applauded the Gardaí's balancing of the safeguarding of people and the right to protest after middle-ranking Gardaí joined those working at the frontline of the protests in raising concerns over the frontline being "grossly undertrained" for the escalating protests.

After similar concerns were raised to Taoiseach Varadkar by the Antoinette Cunningham of the garda representative group the Association of Garda Sergeants and Inspectors, the Taoiseach said he understood from Simon Harris's meeting with Drew Harris (the Garda Commissioner), that "the training is in place". He addressed criticism from the public over Gardaí not intervening in the protests and said "there's a way of managing" them. He later clarified on 22 May that "over-response by authorities of the state" is part of the far-right protesters' "playbook" and that he does not want to "fall into their trap" and instead to "build a consent" around housing International Protection seekers. Cunningham said to Morning Ireland that Gardaí felt "they had not received proper training about peaceful crowd management" and criticised the commissioner's claim of "operational integrity" as frontline gardaí had no direction from senior garda management what their role was besides preventing a breach of the peace on top of her concerns of the frontline being grossly untrained. She requested that there be training relating to the Public Order Act and the Incitement to Hatred Act for the "spontaneous protests that can arise with very little notice" that Gardaí have less time to plan for.

The Tánaiste, Micheál Martin, said that the commissioner was "confident" that Gardaí had the capacity to deal with anti-refugee protests but Green Party TD Patrick Costello called for the commissioner to appear at the Oireachtas Justice Committee on the recent attacks on migrants and migrant centres. Supporters of better management of protests include the Immigrant Council of Ireland, the Movement of Asylum Seekers in Ireland and Green Party TD Neasa Hourigan.

== Slogans ==
The phrase "Ireland is full" is a slogan that has trended on Twitter (as the hashtag "#IrelandIsFull") prior to these protests. It means that Ireland does not have any more accommodation or support for asylum seekers.

Nativist slogans like "Ireland for the Irish" and "Ireland belongs to the Irish" have been used by parties like the National Party.

The anti-immigration movement claims to represent 90% of Irish people and that 90% of people polled disagree with the government's asylum seeker policy.

== Use of the Irish flag ==
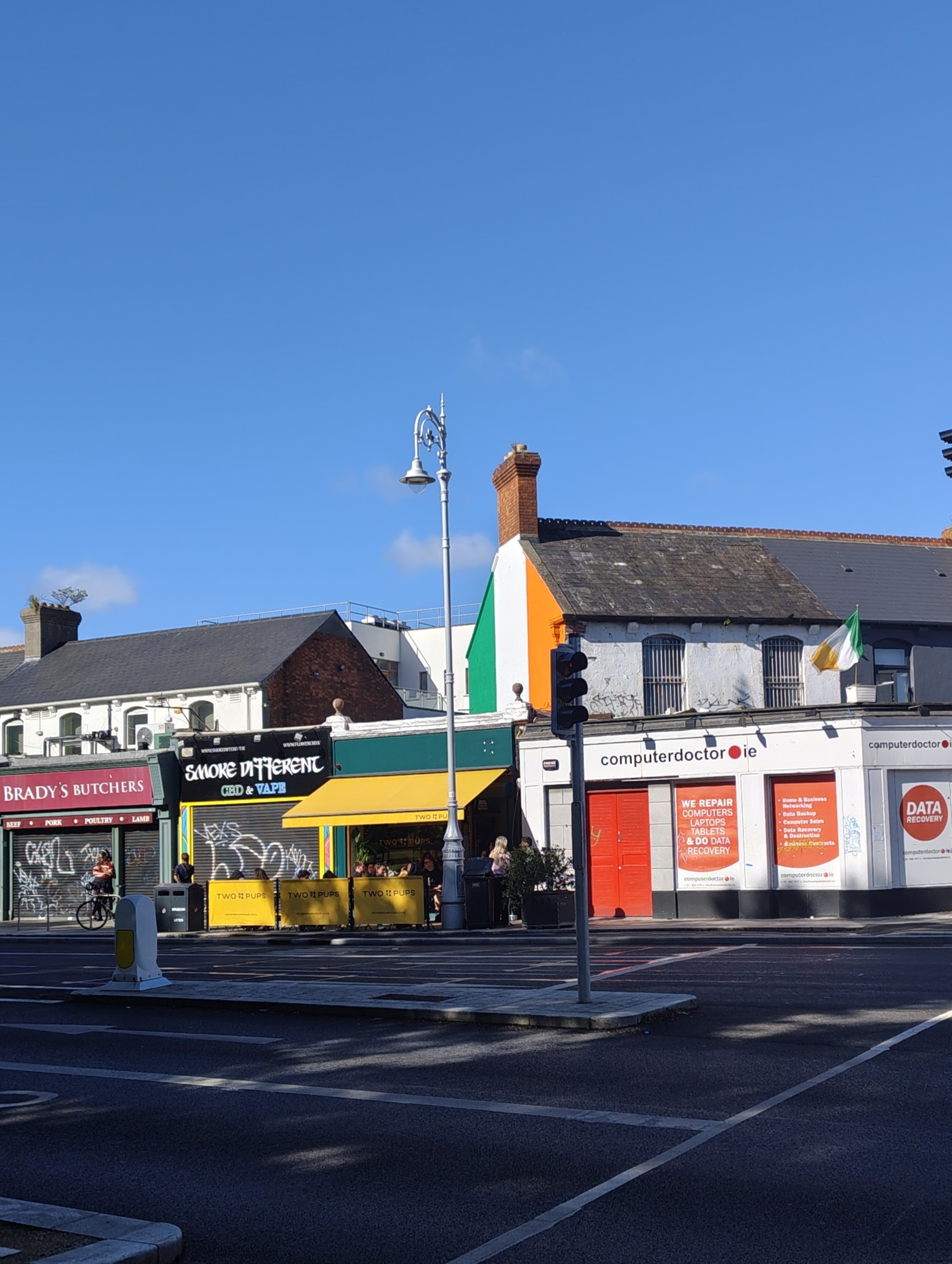
Irish flag mural in Fairview, Dublin seemingly erected by a local right wing and anti-immigration campaigner whose business operates from this building.

Beginning in August 2025, the erection of Irish flags on lampposts and buildings across numerous towns and cities in Ireland was noted. Apparently taking inspiration from similar activities in England known as Operation Raise the Colours, the flags have been promoted on social media by anti-migrant groups to use the flag to "reclaim" areas for Irish people and were being erected by anti-immigration campaigners.

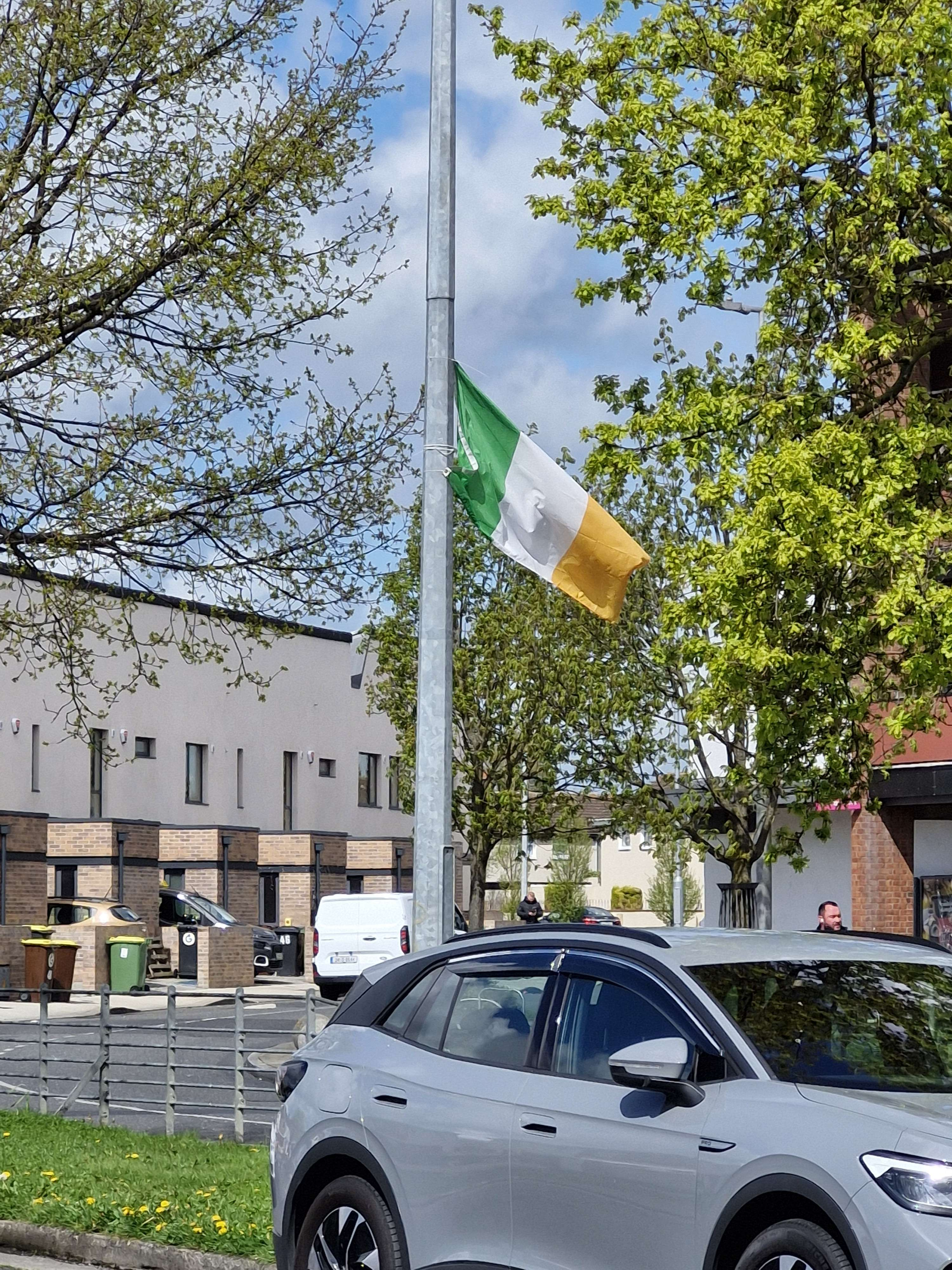
flag of Ireland hung up on a lampost in Ballymun, Dublin

Posts on social media used hashtags such as "Irish Lives Matter". Local county councils appeared to be reluctant to remove them, with concerns around harassment and abuse cited.

== Reactions ==
=== Political response ===
On 12 January 2023, Taoiseach Leo Varadkar commented that while communities have the right to be consulted by the government about who is placed there, he stated "I don't think any community can have a veto on who gets to live in their area. I think we need to be very careful not to make the mistake of confusing consultation and information with communities, which is important, with the idea that any community can have a veto on the kind of people who get to live in their area. That's not right."

On 3 February 2023, Minister for Housing Darragh O'Brien commented that "First and foremost, what I saw in Finglas this week and what I have seen across the country with some of the protests has to be condemned outright. People have a right to protest and have their view, even if I don't share their view. They don't have a right to intimidate people. They don't have a right to bully people. Some of the activity we have seen is reprehensible" before suggesting that a number of the protests had been "hijacked" by "far-right agitators" seeking to capitalise on local unrest.

On 5 February 2023, President Michael D. Higgins said in relation to the protests "What is unforgivable and must be opposed—publicly, vocally and unequivocally—are those who are trying to take advantage by sowing hate and building fear. We are in a position now where we have elements who are not interested in solving the long-standing problems within communities or the new arrivals. You mustn't give them the opportunity. The best way of not giving them the opportunity is to fill the place with services. These people who are going around whipping people up and so forth, you didn't see them previously making a case for housing, or for women's rights, or for equal rights of any kind".

Joe O'Brien, a Minister of State at the DCEDIY told the lower house Dáil Éireann on 30 May 2023 that the Department of the Taoiseach had been making plans over several months to implement a communications strategy involving the provision of prior information, where possible, to local representatives about new migrants moving in. In the meantime, Social Democrats leader Holly Cairns TD described the cabinet as being "at war" on the issue, with the government's response being "chaotic", criticising the lack of information.

=== Polling ===
On 29 January 2023, RED C/The Business Post published polling that included a number of questions relating to immigration:

Question	Yes	No	Don't know	
Question	Irish people welcome refugees, it's just the far-right activists that oppose this	55%	34%	11%
The government is doing a good job dealing with the Ukrainian refugee crisis	43%	49%	8%	
I would support the government using new powers to install modular homes for Ukrainian refugees, without planning permission, in my area	45%	46%	9%	

On February 5, Ireland Thinks/the Sunday Independent published polling that included a number of questions relating to immigration:

Question	Yes	No	Don't know						
Question	Has Ireland taken in too many refugees in the past year?	56%	30%	14%					
Do you think those who are opposed to the location of refugee centres across Ireland are:	Predominantly concerned local residents	Predominantly far-right agitators	Don't know						
Do you think those who are opposed to the location of refugee centres across Ireland are:	48%	44%	8%						
Do you believe the media reporting of the refugee situation in Ireland is	Biased in favour of refugees and against those with concern	A balanced fair reflection of the issues involved	Biased against refugees and in favour of those with concerns						
Do you believe the media reporting of the refugee situation in Ireland is	42%	38%	20%						
Agree with statement by party affiliation	SF	FF	FG	GP	Lab	SD	PBP–S	Aon	O/I
You agree that Ireland has taken in too many refugees in the past year	61%	56%	47%	21%	41%	33%	16%	89%	76%

In May 2023, Red C/The Business Post published another polling that included a number of questions relating to immigration: It found that 75% of people thought that Ireland is taking in too many refugees, it also found that of Sinn Féin supporters it was 83%, Fianna Fáil it was 74% and Fine Gael at 70%. For supporters of independents it was 88%.

=== Business response ===
On 4 February, The Irish Times reported that internal memos amongst members of the government coalition warned that hoteliers were backing away from taking government contracts over fears that protests would take place outside their businesses.

=== "Ireland for All" Solidarity Rally ===
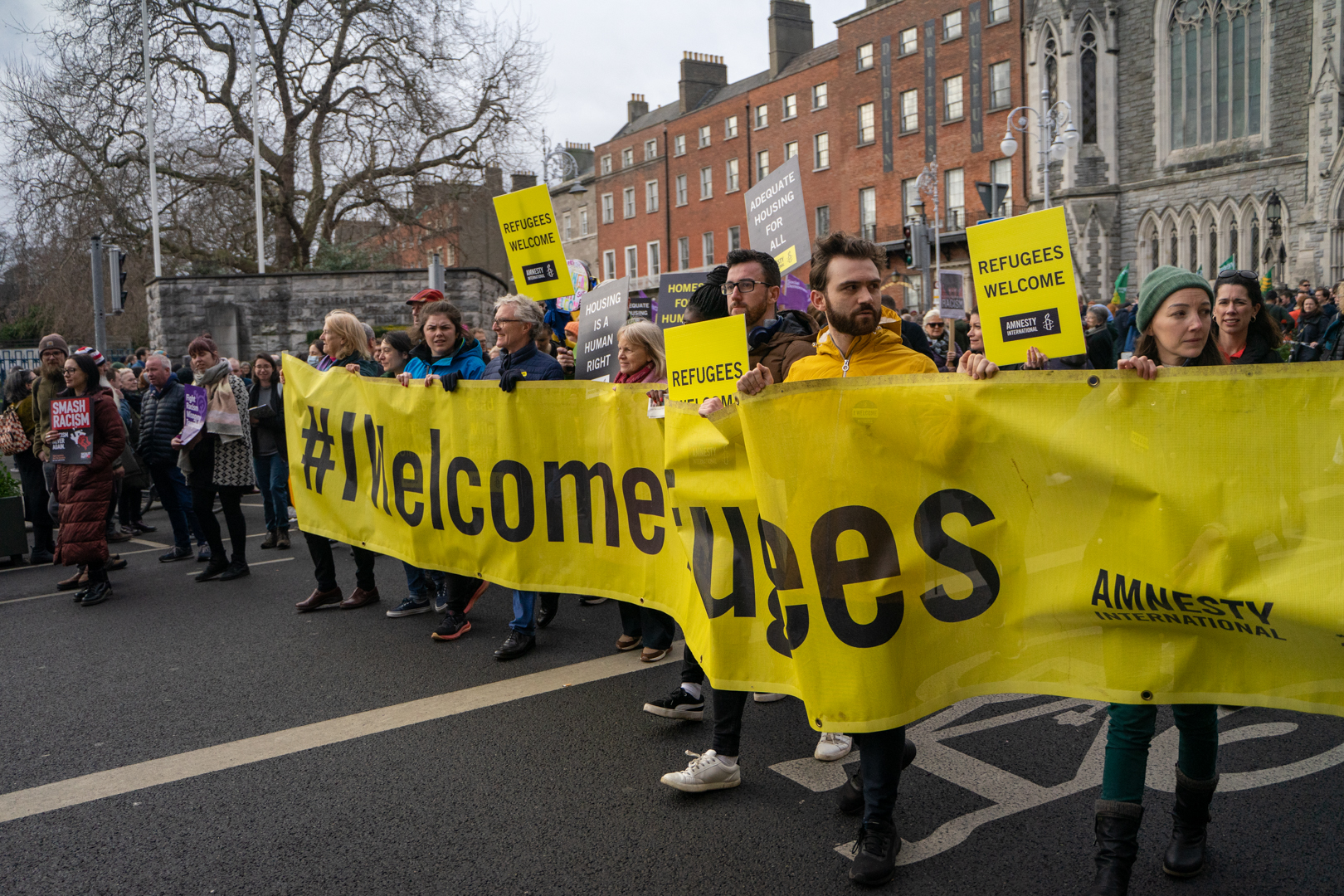
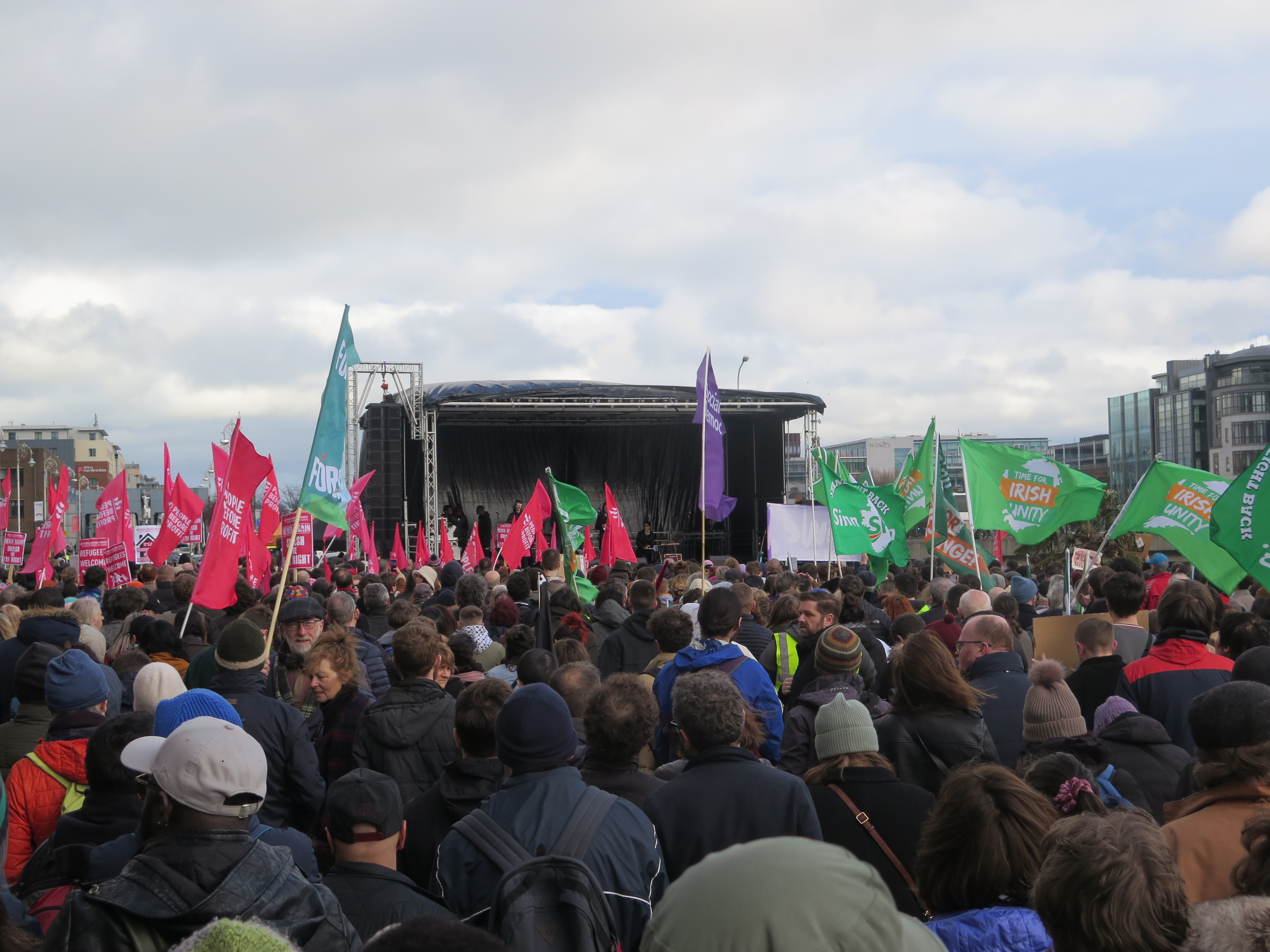
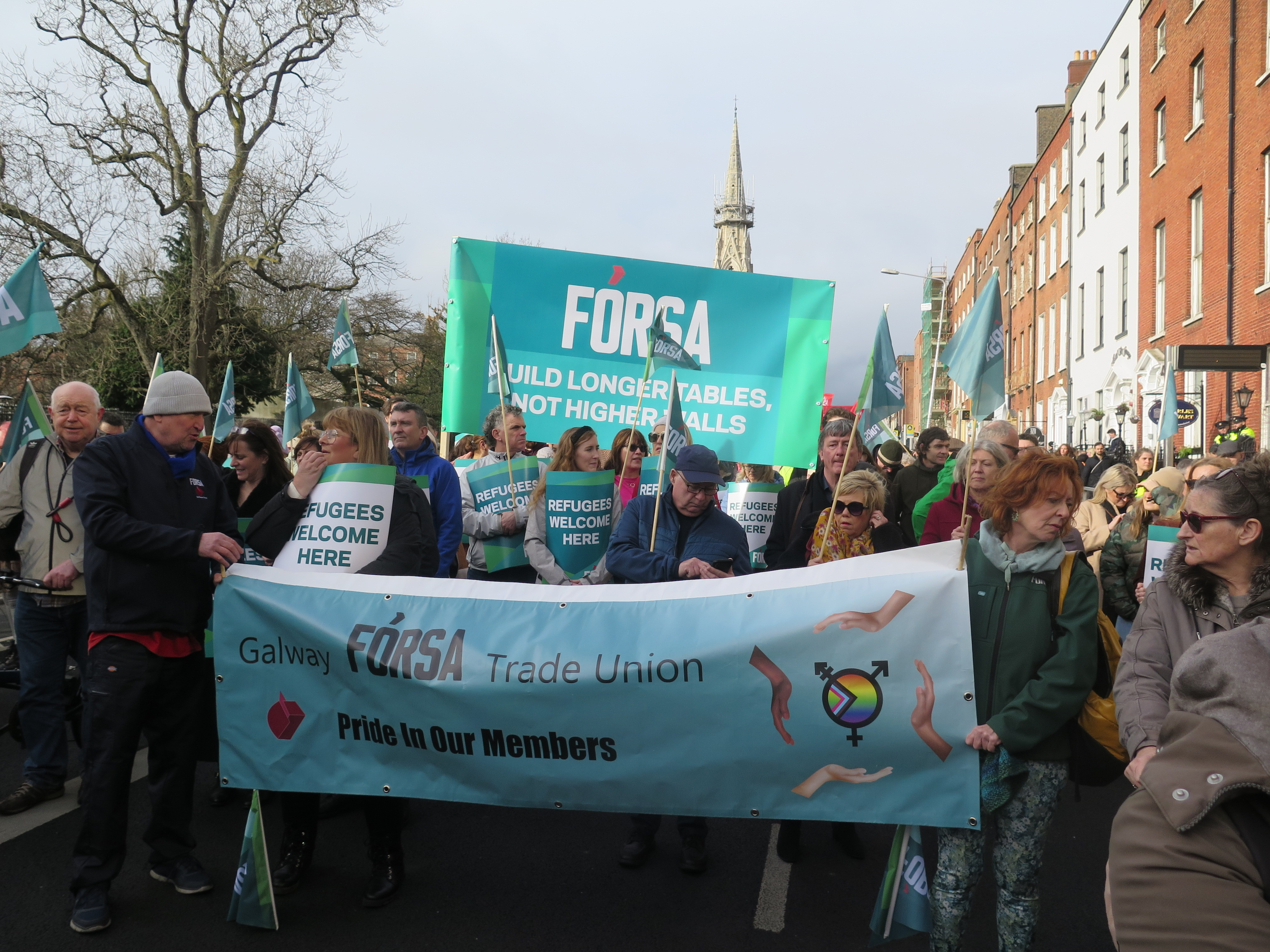
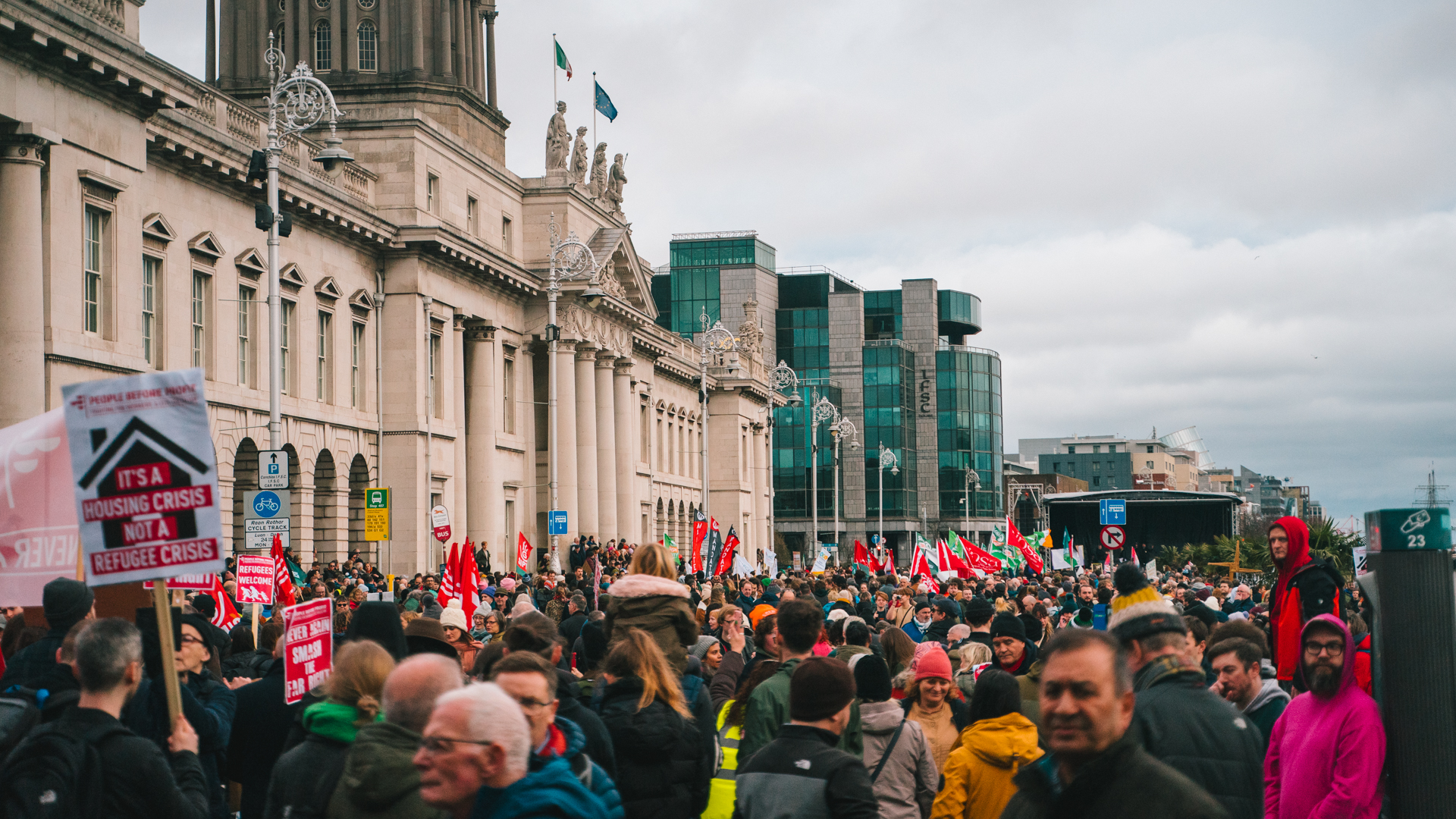
Marchers during the "Ireland for All" Solidarity rally on 18 February 2023

On 18 February, around 50,000 marchers rallied in Dublin and others in Sligo under the banner of "Ireland For All". The Dublin rally was organised by the newly founded organisation, "Le Chéile", which comprises almost 50 member organisations and which had called for a march in support of "diversity not division", and opposition to racism. Attendees at the Dublin rally included members and supporters of Sinn Féin, the Social Democrats, the Labour Party and People Before Profit-Solidarity. Other organisations present included various trade unions such as Fórsa, SIPTU and the Teachers' Union of Ireland; the Movement of Asylum Seekers in Ireland, Pavee Point and the National Women's Council of Ireland. Marchers were still passing the GPO as the front of the march reached Custom House Quay. When the march arrived at the Customs House, Christy Moore spoke and performed, and Bernadette McAliskey addressed the rally, saying "...the question that must be asked of the nation and of individuals is 'Whose side are you on?'" She said one side is the side of humanity, decency and human rights, and that the other side is "on the road to fascism."

== See also ==
- 2025 Northern Ireland riots
