= National Traveller Women's Forum =

- Founded: 1988
- Location: 4/5 Eustace Street, Dublin
- Fields: Irish Travellers
- Website: www.ntwf.net

The National Traveller Women's Forum (NTWF) is an Irish network of traveller women and women's groups.

== History ==
The NTWF was founded in 1988 in order to advance "Traveller women's rights [as] human rights, equality, cultural recognition, solidarity, liberation, collective action, anti-sexism, anti-racism [and] self-determination". The Forum developed out of the Dublin Travellers Education and Development Group (DTEDG), with the Group initially funding and supporting the Forum.

== Core activities ==
The NTWF's vision is "Traveller Women have achieved full equality and their identity is celebrated." It has worked in the fields including unemployment, accommodation, and discrimination and plans to work on supporting traveller women in prison. They also have highlighted the issues Traveller women face regarding mental and physical health, in particular the discrepancy between the life expectancy of Traveller community in comparison to the settled community. It is a member of the National Women's Council of Ireland, a company limited by guarantee incorporated in 2002, and a registered charity, RCN 20045364.

Alongside other Traveller advocacy groups including Minceirs Whiden, Irish Traveller Movement, and Pavee Point, the Forum conducts periodic surveys of the Travelling community and perceptions of the settled community. In 2019, with Tallaght Traveller Community Development Project and Blanchardstown Traveller Development Group, the Forum called on the Irish government to pay members of the Travelling community reparations for the racism they have identified within the policies of the Irish State. The Forum also campaign on the accessibility of education to Traveller children, and the effects of government policy educational outcomes for these children in comparison to their settled peers.

With over 20 groups including Amnesty International Ireland, the Immigrant Council of Ireland, and the Irish Refugee Council, in January 2020 the Forum co-signed an open letter to the Irish government calling on politicians to not use "hate speech". In reaction to the murder of George Floyd and the Black Lives Matter protests, the Forum joined with other Travellers' groups to draw attention to the racism and prejudice experienced by their communities.

The NTWF's co-ordinator is Maria Joyce. In 2020, one of the group's active members, Eileen Flynn, was planning to run for the Seanad, having received a nomination from the Labour Party. She was appointed to the Senate by the Taoiseach, as an independent member, in June 2020. The Forum has called for the establishment of a permanent senator for Travellers in the Seanad.

After a case involving sexual abuse in a Traveller family over many years, the Forum and other Traveller women's advocacy groups highlighted the systemic failure of a number of state agencies that prolonged the abuse.
