= Bulelani Mfaco =

South African human rights activist

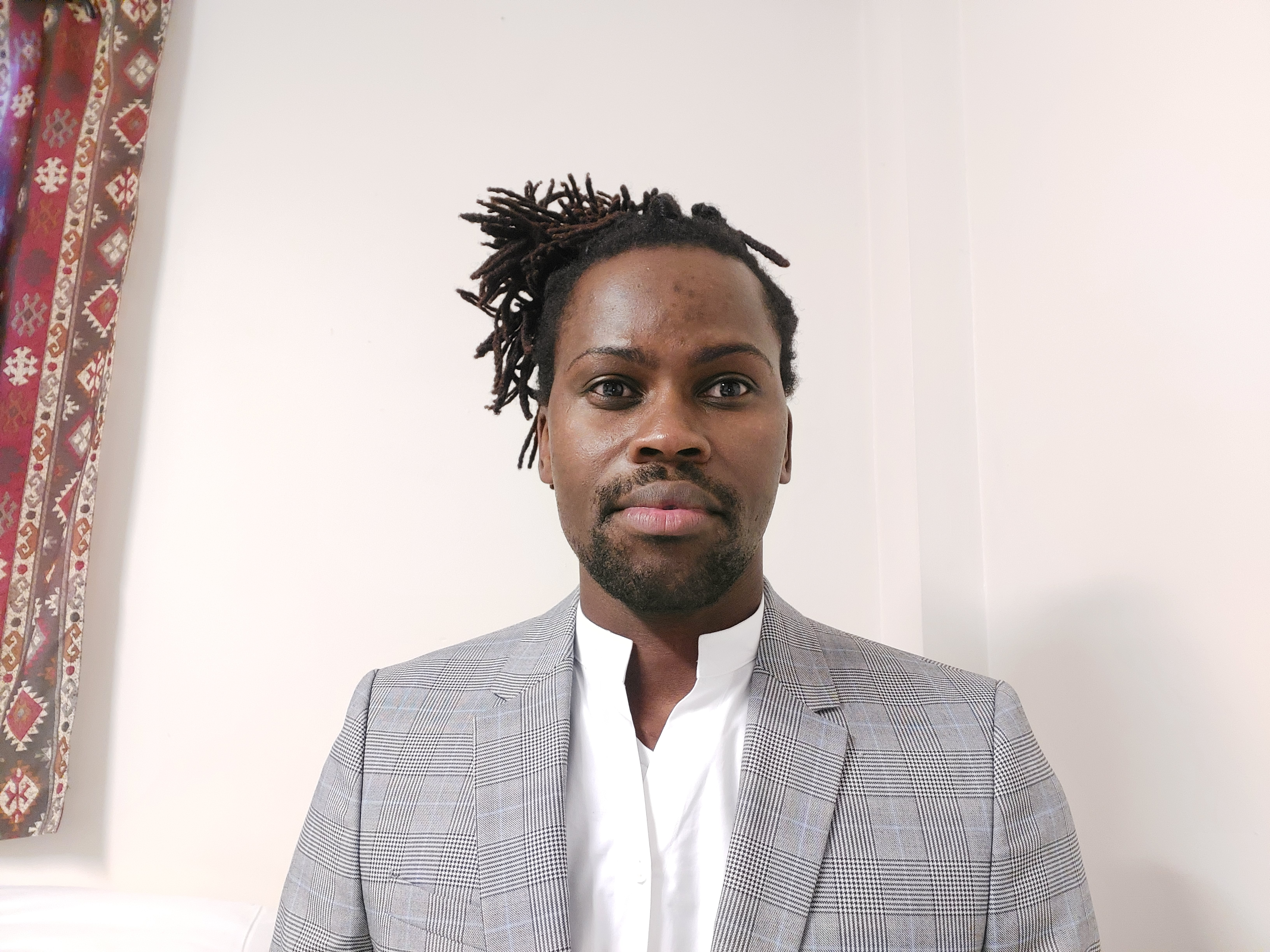
- Born: Libode (Mpondoland), Eastern Cape, South Africa
- Education: University College Dublin, University of the Western Cape
- Occupation: Activist
- Movement: Movement of Asylum Seekers in Ireland (MASI)

Bulelani Mfaco is a South African asylum seeker and activist in Ireland, and former spokesperson for the Movement of Asylum Seekers in Ireland. In December 2024, the group announced that Mfaco had accepted and commenced with full-time employment elsewhere and he would not be serving as the group’s spokesperson. He had been in this role for 7 years voluntarily.

== Career ==
While in South Africa, Mfaco was involved in protests calling for better housing, access to land with Abahlali baseMjondolo, healthcare and for improved policing. He was an active member of the Khayelitsha health forum and was branch secretary for the Democratic Alliance.

Having applied for asylum in Ireland in 2017, Mfaco was placed in direct provision centres, first in Dublin, later in County Clare and County Limerick. Based on his experiences within this system, he joined the Movement of Asylum Seekers in Ireland (MASI) and now acts as their spokesperson. He has spoken out about the issues faced by members of the LGBT community within direct provision, as well as the sub-standard living conditions in many centres across Ireland, describing them as "ghettos in every sense of the word". He has described how victims of sexual assault are particularly vulnerable within direct provision, and that the way in which people are housed can leave people open to further attacks, particularly those in the LGBT community. He has written reports and documented life within the system, strongly advocating for it to be abolished. Despite holding a permit to work, Mfaco has only worked one hour of paid work since 2018, he says Irish employers not understanding the permit given to asylum seekers. In 2019, Mfaco successfully appealed to the Press Council of Ireland in upholding a complaint against The Irish Times for their publication of a racial slur.

During the COVID-19 pandemic, Mfaco has spoken out about how living conditions within direct provision centres make social distancing or self-isolation impossible due to over-crowding and shared facilities. Mfaco is MASI's representative in the Expert Group established by Minister Charlie Flanagan and David Stanton to come up with a long term approach to the provision of material supports including accommodation for asylum seekers drawing from international best practice.

== Personal life ==
Mfaco grew up in Khayelitsha in Cape Town. He has a degree in politics and public administration from the University of the Western Cape. He was admitted to the University of the Western Cape through the University’s Recognition of Prior Learning as he hadn’t completed secondary school education. On completion of his studies, he applied for a scholarship for a master's degree in University College Dublin and moved to Ireland in 2015. Having experienced homophobia and attacks in South Africa, Mfaco applied for asylum in Ireland in 2017 on his return from South Africa, having completed his master's degree in 2016. At this point, he was moved into a direct provision centre in Balseskin, Finglas, Dublin. He has since lived in centres in County Clare and Knockalisheen, County Limerick. His application for asylum was rejected in July 2019, which he is appealing. He was granted permission to remain in February 2023.
