= International protection =

International protection may refer to:

- International Protection Rating, for electronic devices, against water, dust etc.
- Protection under the UN Convention Relating to the Status of Refugees
  - International Protection Accommodation Services, an Irish government unit
