= Doras (NGO) =

Irish non-governmental organisation

- Founded: 2000
- Type: Humanitarian NGO
- Location: Limerick, Ireland
- Fields: Refugees, Activism, NGO
- Key people: John Lannon (CEO)
- Website: doras.org

Doras is an Irish independent, non-governmental organisation advocating for the rights of migrants in Ireland based in Limerick.

== History ==
Doras (formerly Doras Luimni) was founded in 2000 in response to the creation of the direct provision system by the Irish government. The name is the Irish for "door" to symbolise an open door for migrants in Ireland. They began by running English language classes and conducting outreach visits to refugees, which they still conduct. From 2015 to 2016, they opened a sub-office in Portlaoise to implement a resettlement project for Syrian refugees.

== Activities ==
Doras provide a number of core activities:

- advice and information centre for migrants
- campaign and advocate for policy change for greater migrant protection, against trafficking, and against racism
- lead and collaborate in integration plans across Ireland

Doras conduct research and report on the conditions in direct provision centres, highlighting issues around mental health, lack of facilities and social outlets for migrants. They have called for the closure of a number of direct provision centres, and for the direct provision system to be ended. They have drawn attention to how charities like Doras have had to provide services that have been withdrawn or not provided by direct provision centres.

During the COVID-19 pandemic, Doras alongside Nasc, the Sanctuary Runners, Irish Refugee Council, Movement of Asylum Seekers in Ireland, and the Immigrant Council of Ireland, called for all vulnerable and at-risk migrants be removed from direct provision centres. They have highlighted the fact that conditions in many of the centres means that those living there cannot adhere to social distancing or self isolation, and have to share living areas and facilities with many other inhabitants.
