= NTWF =

NTWF may refer to:

- National Transport Workers' Federation, British association of trade unions 1910–1927
- National Traveller Women's Forum, Irish organisation founded 1995
