= Lucky Khambule =

South African human rights activist based in Ireland

- Born: Natal, South Africa
- Occupation: Activist

Lucky Khambule is a South African former asylum seeker and activist in Ireland, and co-founder of the Movement of Asylum Seekers in Ireland.

== Career ==
Khambule lived in direct provision for some years after his arrival in Ireland in 2013.

He was involved in organising a strike of residents of a direct provision centre outside Cork, protesting the restrictive rules that were enforced around eating times and access to supplies such as toiletries. The strikers took over the centre, locking the staff out for 10 days. It ended when some of the residents' demands were met. In 2014, Khambule co-founded the Movement of Asylum Seekers in Ireland which advocates for greater rights for asylum seekers and calls for the end of direct provision.

Khambule was one of the central activists on the campaign to allow asylum seekers in Ireland to work. In 2017 the Supreme Court ruled that the absolute ban on asylum seekers from working was unconstitutional. He has since been critical of the system under which asylum seekers can access work.

He has highlighted issues such as the lack of access to third-level education for children in direct provision, and the impact of residents being unable to cook their own food in centres. Khambule has also spoken about the mental health implications of long term residency in direct provision centres, and the consequences of increased over-crowding in centres.

During the COVID-19 pandemic, Khambule highlighted the issue of children in direct provision having less access to educational resources than their peers, and that they were suffering in more stringent lock down. He was one of those speaking about the issues regarding social distancing and self-isolating for those living in direct provision during the pandemic, and the high level of confirmed cases amongst residents.

On 6 June 2020, Khambule addressed the Black Lives Matter protest in Dublin. He has spoken about the difficulty that asylum seekers, black and people of colour face in gaining employment and other opportunities due to racism in Ireland.

== Personal life ==
Khambule was born in South Africa. He came to Ireland in 2013 and claimed asylum due to "political violence north of Durban in 2012," and was placed in a direct provision centre outside Cork.
