= Ipas =

IPAS or Ipas may refer to:

- Intelligent Parking Assist System, technology developing to assist drivers in parking their vehicle
- International Protection Accommodation Services, Irish Government unit
- India Pale Ales
- Ipas (organization), an international women's health organization
