= Irish Traveller Movement =

Non-profit organisation

- Founded: 1990
- Type: Non-governmental organisation
- Purpose: Advocacy, social justice, human rights and education with a focus on the Travelling Community
- Location: 4-5 Eustace Street, Temple Bar, Dublin, Ireland
- Fields: Irish Travellers
- Key people: Bernard Joyce
- Employees: 12
- Website: itmtrav.ie

The Irish Traveller Movement (ITM) is a national organisation for members of the Travelling community and Traveller organisations in Ireland.

== History ==
The Irish Traveller Movement (ITM) was founded in 1990 and incorporated in 1998, with Catherine Joyce as the founding chairperson. The organisation represents 40 local and national Traveller groups from the island of Ireland.

== Core Activities ==
The ITM collects and publishes data and reports relating to living conditions, educational prospects, and other aspects of the lives of Irish Travellers. It advocates for equality for Travellers in all aspects of life, promotes pride in the culture and identity of the Travelling community and promotes and produces evidence based solutions for all issues affecting the Travelling community.

The organisation has partnered with organisations such as St Stephen's Green Trust on programmes such as the Travellers in Prison Initiative. It has held initiatives such as Traveller Focus Week from 2004. ITM was one of the groups which submitted recommendations to a Seanad Committee on the inclusion of Travellers in Irish public life. During the COVID-19 pandemic, the ITM highlighted the difficulty the Travelling communities have relating to access to clean water, toilets, and the cramped sites on which many families live.

=== Free legal aid ===
ITM is one of a number of not-for-profit organisations in Ireland which provide free legal advice to travellers, alongside Mercy Law Resource Centre, Ballymun Community Law Centre, the Immigrant Council of Ireland, the Irish Refugee Council, the Free Legal Advice Centres, and Northside Community Law Centre.

=== Roma community ===
The organisation has also been one of the groups, alongside Pavee Point, who have partnered with organisations and individuals advocating for the Roma community.

=== Traveller Pride Week ===
The ITM is the coordinator of the Traveller Pride Week, which hosts the Traveller Pride Awards. It established the awards in 2009. Awards are given out across 7 fields: community, enterprise and employment, sport, education, intersectionality, youth, arts and culture, and music. Past winners have included Laura Angela Collins and Oein DeBhairduin.

== See also ==
- Pavee Point
