= Nasc (NGO) =

Irish migrant rights organization

- Founded: 2000
- Type: Humanitarian NGO
- Location: Cork, Ireland
- Fields: Refugees, activism, NGO
- Key people: Fiona Finn (CEO)
- Website: nascireland.org

Nasc is an Irish independent, non-governmental migrant rights centre in Ireland, based in Cork.

== History ==
Nasc was founded in 2000 in Cork by Sisters of Mercy, the Society of African Missions and a group of activists, in response to the creation of the direct provision system. They aimed to provide information and advice to migrants in Ireland. Initially based in Bishop's Street, the organisation moved to Enterprise House on Mary Street, Cork in 2005. From 2007, the group has given legal advice with funding from Atlantic Philanthropies and the One Foundation. They are now located in 34 Paul Street.

== Activities ==
In 2015 Nasc produced a map of incidents of racism and hate crimes in Ireland. They have provided legal support to the Roma community in Ireland.

Nasc have been involved in integration programmes for migrants, such as those from Syria in County Cork. In collaboration with other groups, they have held a legal information evening to deal with the uncertainties around Brexit, while highlighting the continuing issues around the lack of information around Brexit for migrants.

They called on the Irish government to take in more refugees in response to the European migrant crisis. In 2016, they launched the Safe Passage campaign to reunite refugees with family members in Ireland.

They have criticised the Irish government for housing migrants and asylum seekers in hotels and B&Bs as emergency accommodation long term due to the lack of space in existing direct provision centres and the problems with establishing new ones. Nasc have called the arson attacks on hotels earmarked for emergency accommodation hate crimes. They have also criticised the Irish government's use of prisons for migrant detentions.

During the COVID-19 pandemic, Nasc alongside Doras, the Sanctuary Runners, Irish Refugee Council, Movement of Asylum Seekers in Ireland, and the Immigrant Council of Ireland, called for all vulnerable and at-risk migrants be removed from direct provision centres. Nasc has also spoken out about the poor facilities and living conditions within direct provision centres. In particular, drawing attention to the inability of those living in the centres to adhere to social distancing and self isolation during the pandemic, and that these residents should be prioritised for testing. They have also highlighted that those working in low paid jobs face similar issues. Nasc worked with Together Ireland to produce videos in over 30 languages providing information about the pandemic.
