= Chinese people in Ireland =

愛爾蘭華人; Sínigh in Éirinn
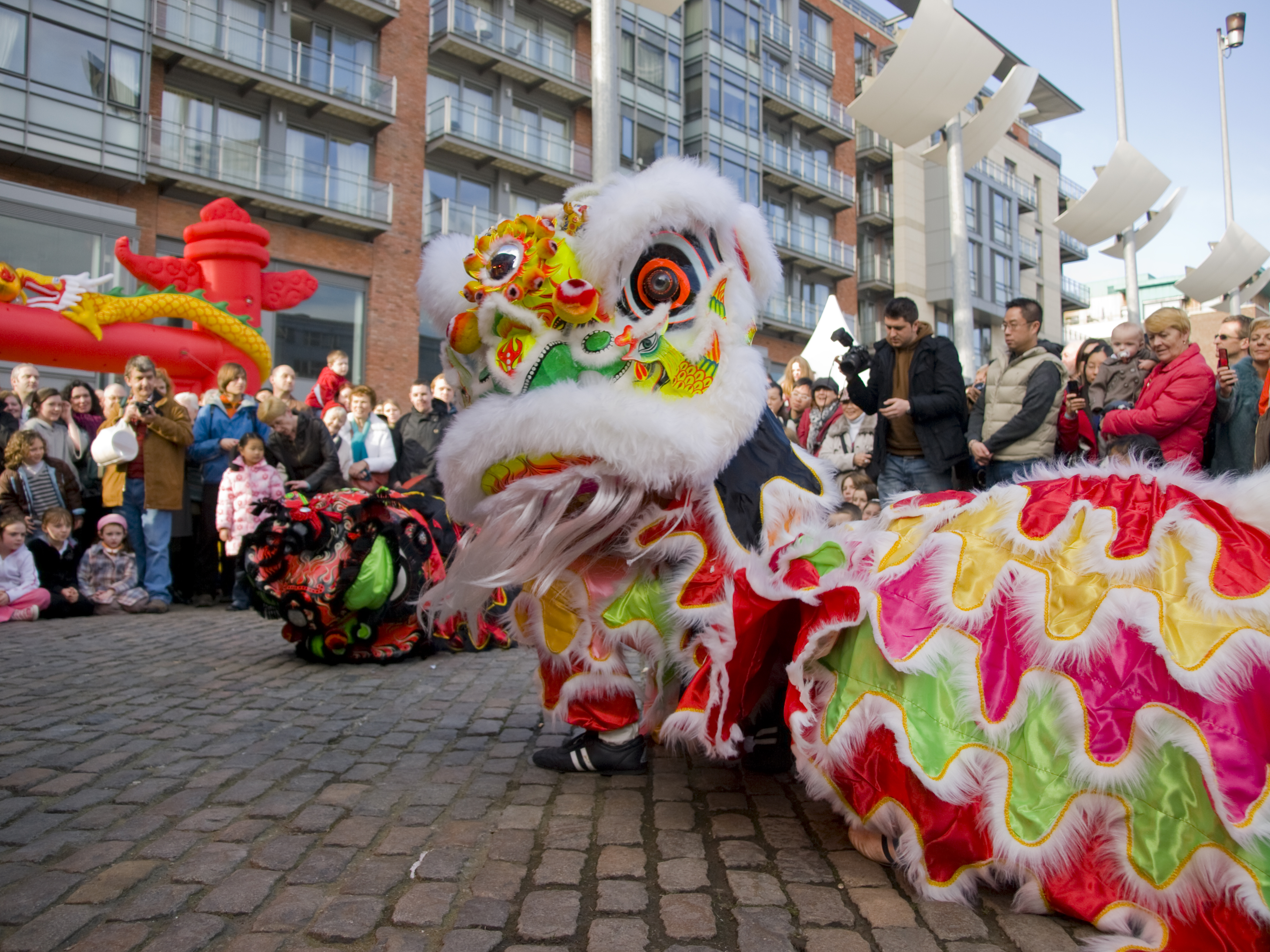
- Chinese New Year celebration in Dublin, 2008

Total population
- 26,828 (2022)

Regions with significant populations
- Dublin

Languages
- Mandarin, Cantonese, English, Irish

Religion
- Irreligion, Buddhism, Atheism, Christianity

Related ethnic groups
- Overseas Chinese, British Chinese

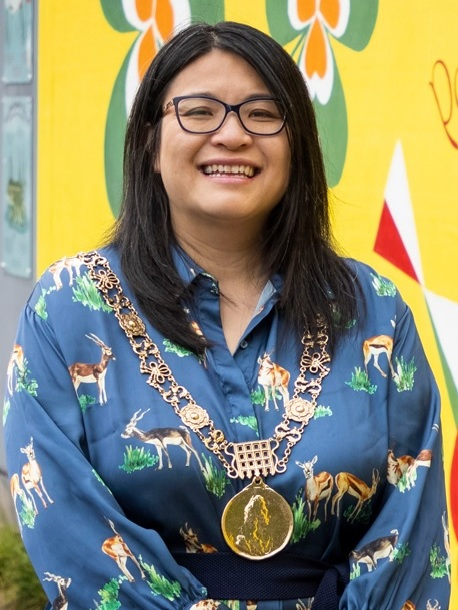
Hazel Chu as Lord Mayor of Dublin in 2021

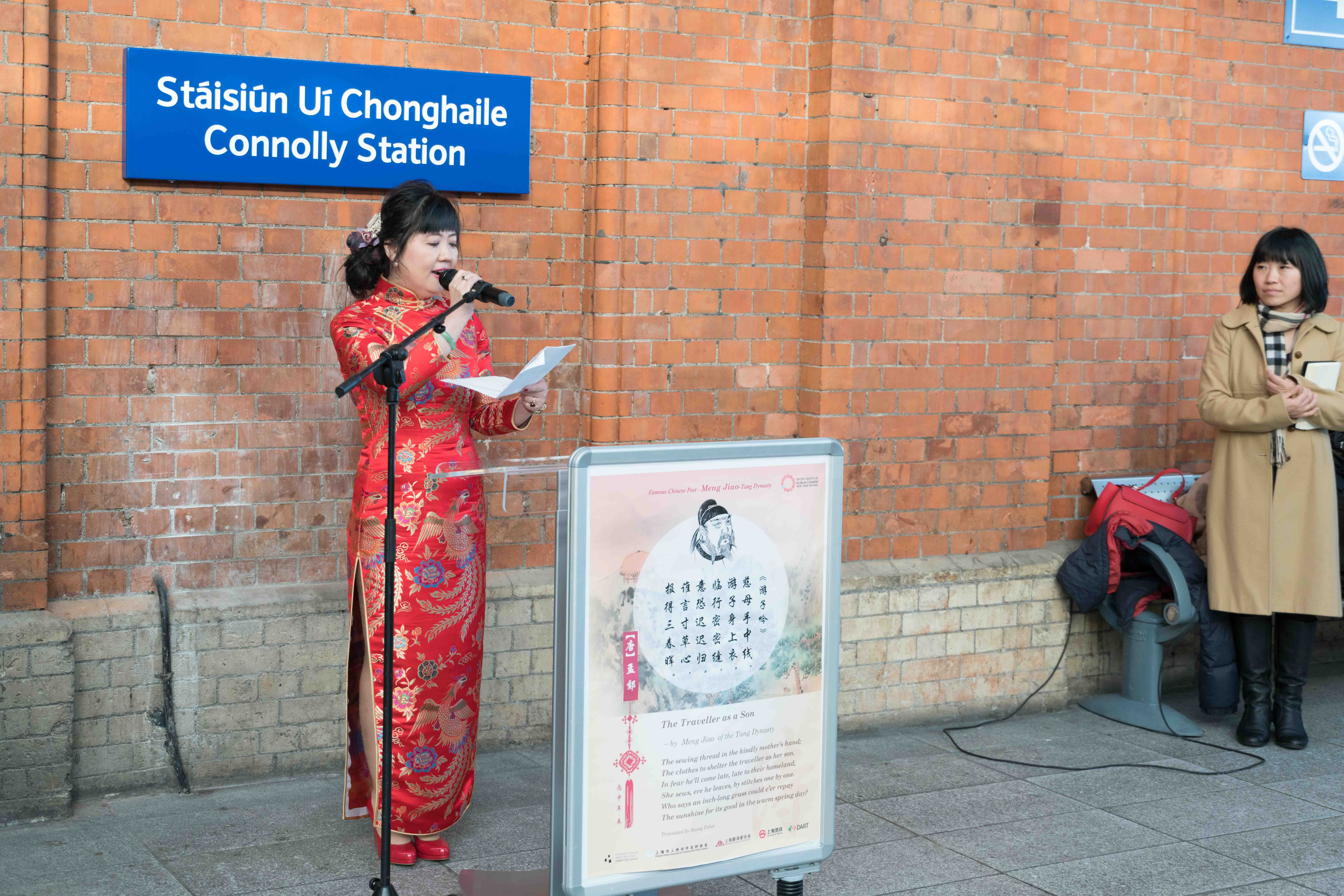
Recitation of Chinese poetry at Dublin Connolly railway station to celebrate Chinese New Year.

Chinese people in Ireland refers to people born in China or people of Chinese descent living in Ireland.

While initial immigration to the country began slow, there are now Chinese businesses sprinkled throughout the country, with a prominent community in Dublin.

Throughout the years, the economic status of the average Chinese-Irish Immigrant has shifted from lower income workers to middle class students.

Their integration into Irish culture has resulted in cultural mixing through Chinese-Irish food.

== History ==
From the 1950s to 1990s, the first major wave of Chinese immigration to Ireland came from Hong Kong; these are known as Hongkongers rather than Chinese nowadays. Many of these Hong Kong migrants trickled over to Ireland from an already established community of Chinese immigrants in the United Kingdom. This first group came to Ireland as teenagers or young adults without education, establishing livelihoods in food industry jobs through catering and setting up Chinese restaurants. They established a network of restaurants that would provide a jobs for future family to work in Ireland. This injection of entrepreneurship brought with it innovation in Ireland. These roots lay the ground work for cultural fusion through merging Irish and Chinese cuisines.

From 1995 - 2005, Ireland went through an era of rapid economic growth, commonly known as the Celtic Tiger. Businesses called for reform of the restrictive immigration and visa system which led to an increased amount of approved work visas to those outside of the European Union.

During this time, there was a second wave of immigration from mainly young professionals who were able to obtain visas and take on higher paying jobs outside of the Chinese takeaway industry. As the Chinese economy also began to boom in the 1990s, so did the population of Chinese middle class students aiming to study abroad in Irish universities. In 2001, there were approximately 10,000 Chinese students studying in Ireland on a student visa. While not as prevalent as the past, the number of Chinese students studying in Ireland have been on an incline since the Covid pandemic, with 3,560 student visas issued in 2025 to Chinese students (a 10.5% increase when compared to 2023 statistics). In 2024, Chinese students accounted for 10.9% of Non-Irish international students in Irish universities, the third highest percentage following students from United States and India.

In the 2010s the Irish government began the "Immigrant Investor Programme" under which non-EU citizens could secure resident status in Ireland if they contributed specified large sums to government-approved projects such as the construction of social housing or nursing homes, or by donating to Irish charities. The Irish Times reported in 2021 that 1,088 wealthy Chinese citizens (out of a total of 1,166 entering the programme) had paid up to €1,000,000 individually to receive Irish residency. In 2018 the Irish Independent reported that Ireland had become the 3rd most popular destination in the world for wealthy Chinese immigrants after the United States and the United Kingdom. A report found that in addition to the Immigrant Investor Programme, Ireland's place in the European Union, its strengths related to technology sector and its low tax burden made it attractive to wealthy Chinese immigrants.

== Demographics ==
Since the first wave of Chinese immigration, Ireland has seen an upwards trend of young Chinese people immigrating.

In 2022, the Irish census recorded 26,828 Chinese people living in Ireland, 38% more than in 2016.

In 2016 the Irish census recorded 19,447 Chinese people living in Ireland. A third of the recorded Chinese in Ireland were aged between 30 and 39 during this year. The second largest age group were those aged 20–24, most likely representing Chinese International students on temporary visas.

In 2006, the Irish census recorded 16,533 Chinese people were living in Ireland, with nearly half of the population consisting of those aged between 20 and 29.

== Chinatown ==
While Ireland doesn't have an official Chinatown, there is consensus among locals of a Chinese community on Parnell Street East and Capel Street in Dublin. On these blocks there are various Chinese restaurants and supermarkets.

Members of the community are torn over the official recognition of these streets as "Dublin's Chinatown" because some feel it would disrupt the business of non-Chinese businesses that are also located in the vicinity.

== Cuisine ==
Chinese restaurants set up by early migrants, locally known as "takeaways" led to cultural fusions, such as through food. The Spice Bag originated at the Sunflower Chinese takeout in the late 2000s as a last minute meal for staff. It typically consists of various vegetables, crispy chicken, tossed with chips/fries, delivered in a brown paper bag.

== Politics ==
In 2020 Hazel Chu of the Green Party became the first Irish-born person of Chinese ethnicity to become Lord Mayor of Dublin. In doing so she was also the first person of Chinese ethnicity to become the mayor of a European capital city.

== Tourism ==
In 2015, 40,000 Chinese people visited Ireland, an increase of 10% from 2014.

== Notable people ==
- Lee Chin, GAA player
- Hazel Chu, politician
- Michael Craig-Martin, artist
- Eden (Jonathon Ng), musician
- Greg O'Shea, rugby player
- Jason Sherlock, footballer and Gaelic footballer
- Da-Wen Sun, academic
- Thaddea Graham, actress
- Steven He, actor and social media personality

== See also ==
- China–Ireland relations
- Chinese diaspora
- Immigration to Ireland
- Chinese people in the United Kingdom
