= Ashtown =

Ashtown may refer to:

- Ashtown, Dublin, a suburb of Dublin, Ireland
- Ashtown, Ghana, a suburb of Kumasi, Ghana
- Ashtown Castle, a fortified house in the Phoenix Park in Dublin
- Ashtown railway station, a nearby station
- Ashtown Burials, a book series by N. D. Wilson
- Baron Ashtown, a title in the Irish peerage.
