= Irish Refugee Council =

Humanitarian NGO

- Founded: 1992
- Type: Humanitarian NGO
- Location: Dublin, Ireland
- Fields: Refugees, IDPs, Activism, NGO
- Key people: Nick Henderson (CEO)
- Website: www.irishrefugeecouncil.ie

The Irish Refugee Council (IRC) is a humanitarian, non-governmental organisation that protects the rights of people affected by displacement.

== History ==
The Irish Refugee Council (IRC) was founded as a non-governmental, membership organisation in 1992. It brings together organisations and individuals working with asylum seekers and refugees. Over its history, it has received funding from the Irish government.

== Core activities ==
The aims of the IRC are to make sure that the asylum policy and practice in Ireland are in full accordance with international law and ensure the human rights of refugees and asylum seekers. It also seeks to promote awareness and understanding of the issues facing refugee and asylum seekers in Ireland. They provide a number of supports for refugees and asylum seekers in Ireland, including a drop-in service, a legal consultation service, and run campaigns.

The IRC have called for the ending of direct provision, as well as calling for more humane deportations and only after all other legal routes have been exhausted. They have also highlighted the issues around the ability and feasibility of newly arrived refugees to Ireland successfully completing the long forms required for their registration.

IRC is one of 7 not-for-profit organisations in Ireland which provide free legal advice, alongside Mercy Law Resource Centre, Ballymun Community Law Centre, the Immigrant Council of Ireland, the Free Legal Advice Centres, the Irish Traveller Movement, and Northside Community Law Centre.

During the COVID-19 pandemic, IRC alongside Nasc, the Sanctuary Runners, Doras, Movement of Asylum Seekers in Ireland, and the Immigrant Council of Ireland, called for all vulnerable and at-risk migrants be removed from direct provision centres.
