= Romani people in Ireland =

Ethnic group in Ireland

Romane manusha andi Irlanda (Romani)

Total population
- ≈ 2,500~3,000

Regions with significant populations
- Dublin

Languages
- Romani, Irish, Hiberno-English

Religion
- Pentecostalism, Romani mythology

The number of Romani people in Ireland (Irish: Lucht Romanaí in Éirinn) is roughly estimated, as the Central Statistics Office collects its data based on nationality and not ethnic origin. For this reason a precise demographic profile of the Romani people in Ireland is not available. Some estimates Ireland give the population at 1,700 in 2004, rising to between 2,500 and 3,000 in 2005. The first Romani people arrived in Ireland in the 16th century, although they are not believed to have established a permanent residence. There are records of Romani people residing in Ireland since the 19th century. However, the majority of the Romani population in Ireland today derive from recent migrations, primarily from Romania, Slovakia, Hungary, Bulgaria, the Czech Republic, Poland, Serbia and Italy.

== History ==
=== Origin ===
The Romani people originate from Northern India, presumably from the northwestern Indian states Rajasthan and Punjab.

The linguistic evidence has indisputably shown that roots of Romani language lie in India: the language has grammatical characteristics of Indian languages and shares with them a big part of the basic lexicon, for example, body parts or daily routines.

Genetic findings in 2012 suggest the Romani originated in northwestern India and migrated as a group. According to a genetic study in 2012, the ancestors of present scheduled tribes and scheduled caste populations of Northern India, traditionally referred to collectively as the Ḍoma, are the likely ancestral populations of the Romani people in Europe.

In February 2016, during the International Roma Conference, the Indian Minister of External Affairs stated that the people of the Romani community were children of India. The conference ended with a recommendation to the Government of India to recognize the Romani community spread across 30 countries as a part of the Indian diaspora.

=== Migration to Ireland ===
Romani people arrived in Europe in the 14th century, first settling in modern-day Bulgaria, Romania and Serbia. They have been present in Ireland since at least the 17th century. Traditionally, they also arrived from Britain for seasonal work, either as farm labourers or as coppersmiths

=== Post-1989 ===
After the dissolution of Eastern Bloc, thousands of Romani people, among others, sought asylum in Ireland and other Western European countries. Their arrival prompted contrasting editorials in the mainstream newspapers. In 1989, Romani started to arrive in Ireland, predominantly by hiding in container lorries. In the summer of 1998, several hundred Romani people arrived hidden in freight containers in Rosslare Harbour, many of them illegally trafficked.

A second impetus for Romani immigration arose after the admittance of an additional 15 states to the European Union, with the populations coming to Dublin and the other major towns and cities.
