= International Protection Accommodation Services =

Irish government unit

The International Protection Accommodation Services (IPAS) is a unit of the Irish Department of Justice, Home Affairs and Migration. It is responsible for the provision of accommodation and related services to people in the international protection process, being those applying for refugee status or subsidiary protection.

== Overview ==
IPAS is responsible for coordinating the provision of services to both asylum seekers and refugees, coordinating the implementation of integration policy for all refugees and persons granted leave to remain in the Republic of Ireland and responding to crisis situations which may result in large numbers of refugees arriving in the country.

== History ==
The Directorate for Asylum Support Services (DASS) was established in November 1999 as a unit of the Department of Justice, Equality and Law Reform. It introduced a system of direct provision for asylum applicants, providing residential accommodation and ancillary services to asylum seekers while they await the outcome of their applications for asylum. To meet this requirement, various private companies provide these services at several accommodation centres on the country, the largest being at Mosney. The system has been criticised by human rights organisations as illegal, inhuman and degrading.

The Reception and Integration Agency (RIA) was established by the Irish government on 2 April 2001 as a merger of the DASS and the Refugee Agency (which was part of the Department of Foreign Affairs).

After a government decision of 2 March 2004, RIA was assigned responsibility for supporting the repatriation, on an ongoing basis for the Department of Social Protection, of nationals of the ten new EU member states (Cyprus, Czech Republic, Estonia, Hungary, Latvia, Lithuania, Malta, Poland, Slovakia, Slovenia) who might fail the Habitual Residency Condition attaching to Social Assistance Payments.

In December 2019, RIA was divided into the International Protection Accommodation Services (IPAS) and the International Protection Procurement Services (IPPS). In October 2020, IPAS and IPPS were transferred from the Department of Justice to the restructured Department of Children, Equality, Disability, Integration and Youth.

== See also ==
- Immigrant Council of Ireland
