= Movement of Asylum Seekers in Ireland =

National advocacy group in Ireland

Movement of Asylum Seekers in Ireland (MASI)
- Founded: 2014
- Fields: Refugees, asylum seekers
- Key people: Bulelani Mfaco (spokesperson), Lucky Khambule (co-founder), Donnah Sibanda Vuma (co-founder), Felix Dzamara (co-founder), Evgeny Shtorn
- Website: www.masi.ie

The Movement of Asylum Seekers in Ireland (MASI) is an Irish advocacy group for those seeking international protection in Ireland, with the goals of ending direct provision and deportation.

== History ==
MASI was founded in 2014 after the protests in direct provision centres to give a voice to, and advocate for, those living in direct provision and seeking asylum in Ireland. One of the founding members of MASI was Lucky Khambule. The group argues that the privatised nature of direct provision centres in Ireland results in chronic issues regarding health, hygiene, and civil and human rights of those housed there. They held their first conference in Liberty Hall, Dublin in October 2019, with a keynote from MASI spokesperson Bulelani Mfaco. Alongside the Irish Refugee Council and Nasc, MASI is one of the groups represented on the independent advisory group reviewing direct provision which reported on the topic.

== Objectives and approaches ==
MASI's core goals include acting as a platform for asylum seekers, seeking justice and dignity for them, while seeking an ultimate end of the direct provision system. They seek education and work rights for asylum seekers, and oppose deportation. The group is not affiliated with any other NGOs or political parties, and is funded through individuals' resources and fundraising, receiving no State or corporate funding. It has no formal membership or organisational structure, making decisions in a collective manner.

== Activities ==
In 2020, MASI have highlighted the systemic issues around the management and containment of COVID-19 in direct provision centres across Ireland, due to problems regarding the inability for people to self-isolate, over-crowding, and lack of facilities for families and children. Some of these centres have been individually identified as having on-going issues, including in Cahersiveen, Miltown Malbay, and Portarlington. MASI alongside Nasc, the Sanctuary Runners, Doras, Irish Refugee Council, and the Immigrant Council of Ireland, called for all vulnerable and at-risk migrants be removed from direct provision centres.

MASI, with Black Pride Ireland and MERJ, were involved in organising Black Lives Matter protests and demonstrations in response to the murder of George Floyd in Ireland in June 2020. This was criticised by the Minister for Health and the head of the National Public Health Emergency Team as contravening the COVID-19 restrictions on movement and mass gatherings.
