= Pavee Point =

Ireland-based non-governmental organisation

Pavee Point Traveller & Roma Center
- Founded: 1985
- Type: Non-profit
- Purpose: Human rights
- Location: 46 Charles Street Great, Dublin, Ireland
- Region served: Worldwide
- Method: Research, public education, advocacy, lobbying
- Key people: Co-Directors: Martin Collins, Lynsey Kavanagh
- Website: paveepoint.ie

Pavee Point (PP) is a government-funded non-governmental organisation based in Dublin, Ireland that was formed to improve the human rights of Irish Travellers and to bridge the economic and social inequalities between Travellers and settled people. Irish Travellers are an ethnic minority group that originated from nomadic tradespeople.

Travellers have suffered a long history of ethnic discrimination. Over time, the subsequent social prejudice and disparity between settled and Traveller educations has economically handicapped the community. Those early disadvantages have since manifested themselves into an elevated dependence on social welfare, a high risk of poverty, and a low life-expectancy for Travellers.

To improve the living conditions of Travellers and to preserve their cultural identity, Pavee Point operates in the following areas: public education, capacity building, advocacy, youth programs, research and policy submissions. The organisation is permanently headquartered in Dublin, but regularly collaborates with other Traveller's rights groups throughout Ireland.

== History ==
Pavee Point was founded in 1985, when the founders purchased Free Church, a defunct Methodist church located on North Great Charles Street, which now functions as the organisation's centre of operations. In 2012 Pavee Point decided to officially change its name to Pavee Point Traveller and Roma Centre. Pavee Point was originally formed as a training agency to promote skill-building and solidarity within the travelling community, but later PP's leaders decided to expand the scope of its activities to a national level. Pavee Point set itself apart from existing Traveller groups in the 80s because they framed their situation in terms of human rights: "-an ethnic minority experiencing discrimination and racism from the majority population."

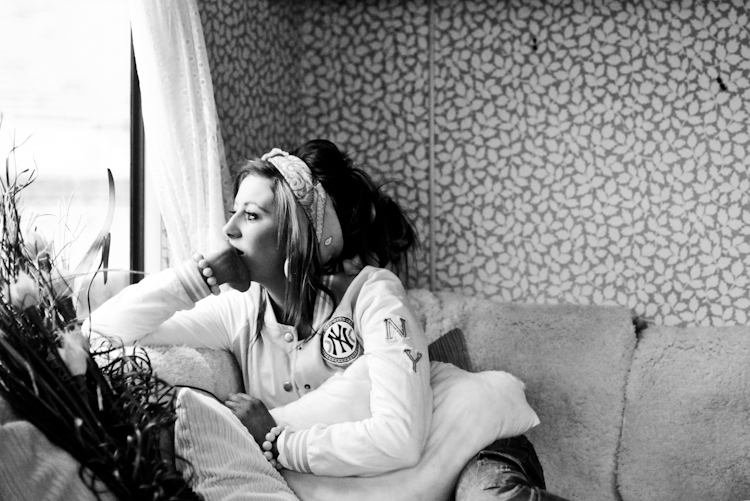
An Irish Traveller in Dublin watches neighbouring children play from her trailer window.

== Mission statement ==
Pavee Point operates in accordance with its seven core principles:

- Human rights
- Social solidarity
- Cultural diversity
- Community development
- Multi-dimensionality
- Partnership
- Equality

== Finances and organisation ==
Pavee Point is a government-funded NGO because the majority of its income is obtained from a variety of official departments and agencies, but its operational activities are managed independent of the Irish government.

In 2016 its income was €1,474,609. The main agencies which provided grants were the Dept. of Social Protection, the City of Dublin Youth Service Board, Pobal and the Health Service Executive Authority.

=== Organizational structure ===
Pavee Point is managed by its two co-directors; Martin Collins, a Traveller, and Lynsey Kavanagh, a settled person. They oversee a senior management team, which is also composed of a mixture of Travellers and settled people- thus encouraging solidarity between the two groups. The senior management team governs sub-groups for issue-oriented programs, including: education, building, men, communications, women, training, international, and a policy forum. In 2016 the average number employed was 3 in administration and 50 in Community Projects.

== Activities and issues ==
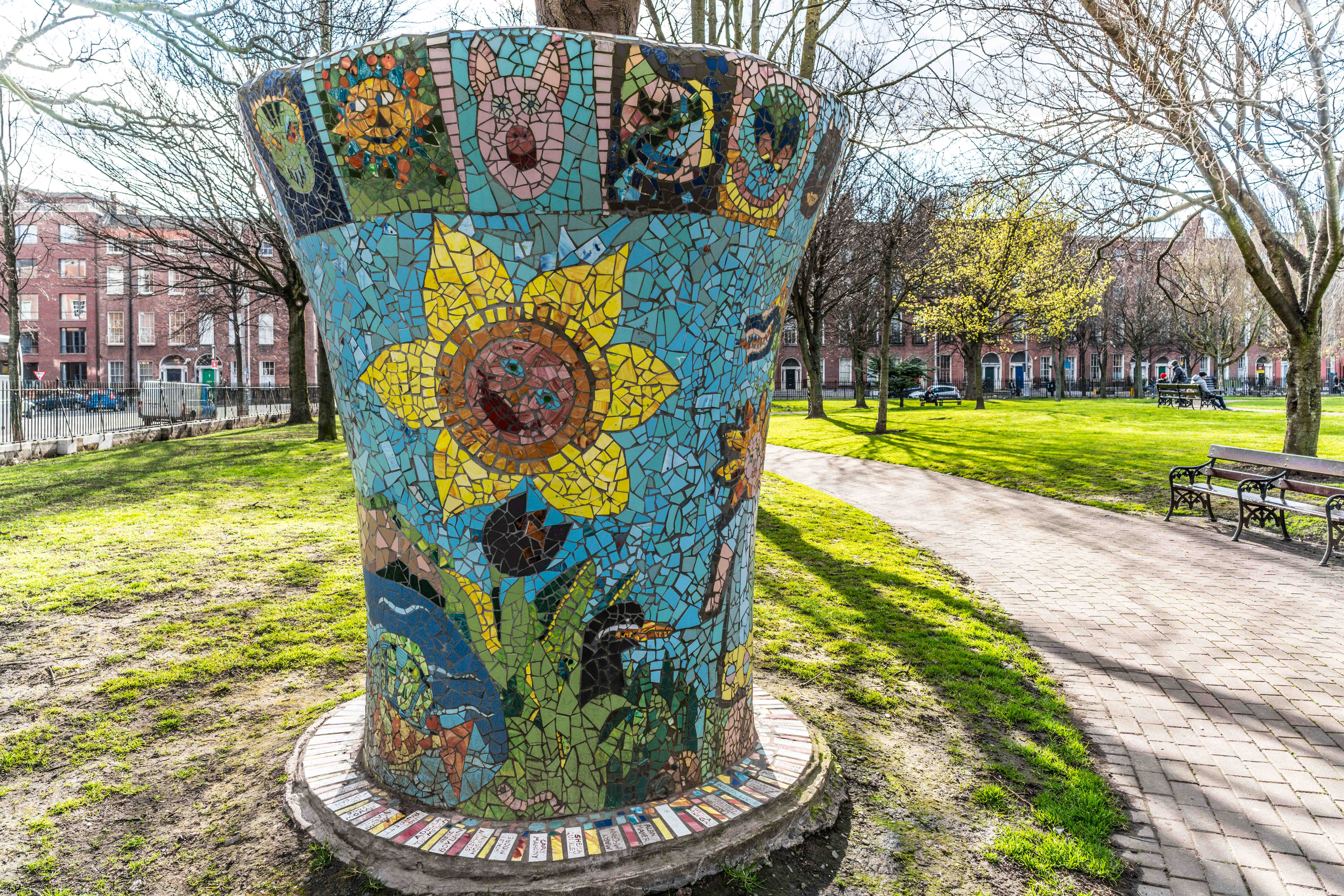
Mosaic tree art by Pavee Point at Mountjoy Square, Dublin

According to the 2016 Census, there are 30,987 Irish Travellers in Ireland. Pavee Point functions as a national resource for that community, in addition to those that work with Travellers, by implementing a multidimensional strategy of action. Pavee Point holds non-Travellers accountable for the conditions of Travellers because inaction allows the problems to persist, "Non-Travellers have a responsibility to address the various processes which serve to exclude Travellers from participating as equals in society." Pavee Point works on local, regional, national, and international levels. The service-oriented programs at Pavee Point are designed to remedy specific issues faced by the travelling community.

=== Education ===
According to the 2002 Census, 54.8% of Traveller children do not pursue an education beyond primary school, and their literacy levels are well below those of settled children, across the board. To help change this, Pavee Point established The Parents and Traveller Education project in August 2004. The goals of the project are: to get Traveller parents more involved in their children's school by educating them about the system itself; and to work with the schools to make them more accepting of Traveller parents. As of 2005, Pavee Point has produced an educational DVD to help familiarise parents with the school system, facilitated workshops for parents about getting involved in school, and provided one-on-one support and advice.

=== Health ===
- Local level: Primary Health Care for Traveller's Project (PHCTP)

In 1994, Pavee Point joined with the Eastern Health Board to form a pilot health initiative; the Primary Care for Traveller's Project. Four years later, the project expanded from Finglas to include Blanchardstown in its radius of service. The goals of the project were to raise awareness about the good health for Travellers, to teach Traveller women basic health-related skills, to facilitate dialogue between Travellers and the health service providers, and to call attention to problems in healthcare distribution for Travellers. To make healthcare more amenable to Travellers, Pavee Point created health informational materials with Traveller-friendly imagery and began educating hospitals and universities about the health issues that Travellers are facing.

- Regional level: Traveller Health Unit (THU)

For the first time, in 1995 a report found that the health needs of Travellers were not being met. To help bridge the gap between Traveller needs and healthcare provisions, the National Traveller Health Advisory Committee was established.

- National Level: National Traveller Health Advisory Committee (NTHAC)

Pavee Point is a representative for Traveller health interests as a member of NTHAC and made extensive contributions to the formation of the National Traveller Health Strategy.

=== Mediation ===
Pavee Point began offering mediation services in 1999 with the hope of mending the relationship between the Traveller and settled communities, and to foster stronger ties within the travelling community as well. Mediation provides a non-violent setting for opposing parties to confront conflict in a civil manner. Participation in mediation is a voluntary act that operates best if there is an understanding of mutual respect. Each party is given the opportunity to clarify his/her problem, identify needs, and explore possible solutions before reaching an agreement. The most common issues among Travellers that may be resolved through mediation are: conflicts over the management of housing sites, unauthorised encampments, and illegal dumping.

The service was later discontinued due to funding cuts.

=== Community development ===
In 2005, Pavee Point hosted Traveller Focus Week during 3–10 December 2005. The theme of the week was recognition, because the recognition of Travellers as an ethnic minority by the Irish government and the rest of the world, is such a critical issue for the community. Events included a photo contest, a concert, a roundtable discussion on equality, and the launch of the parental education DVD, Pavee Parents Primary Concerns, among others. 2,000 participated in the events throughout the week.

=== Employment ===
Programs to promote and assist the employment of Travellers, especially in public service, are of critical importance to Pavee Point. The Civil Service Traveller Internship Program was organised by PP in 2005 to introduce Travellers to the public service work experience. The program entails a six-month paid internship with a government department or agency for approximately 20 Travellers.

== International involvement ==
Pavee Point's decision to advocate for Travellers rights internationally, rather than in Ireland, is a definitive feature of its operations. As phrased in the 2003–2005 tri-annual report: "Our rationale for this work is that many of the problems that Irish Travellers face, such as racism, exist outside of the country and are unlikely to be resolved at a national level alone." Working internationally has allowed PP to network with other minority groups, learn new strategies for activism, and to get Traveller rights issues into the current dialogue on international human rights.

- In 2003, the Council of Europe invited PP to attend two conferences as an expert on and representative of the Traveller community. At the second seminar on 'Challenges for Cooperation and Integration between Roma and Travellers and local and Regional Authorities', Pavee Point representatives were given the opportunity to speak to an international audience.
- In 2004, the European Roma and Traveller Forum was formed after 10 years of careful deliberation. PP is a founding member of the forum, and is represented by Martin Collins. Along with two other delegates, Collins will form the official voice for the Irish Traveller ethnic group at a European level.
- in 2004, PP submitted a Shadow Report to UN Convention on the Elimination of All Forms of Racial Discrimination (CERD). The Irish government had already sent a report of its own that included the fact that it would not acknowledge Travellers as an ethnic minority group. Pavee Point contested the Irish Government's refusal to recognise Travellers as an ethnic group. In their CERD report, PP described the government's actions as closed-minded and reprehensible- and not without negative ramifications for settled-Traveller relations. In 2005, Pavee Point was represented in CERD's hearing on Ireland.
- The Traveller & Roma Action for Implementation of Legal & Equality Rights (TRAILER) Project was formed by five countries to aid in the implementation of anti-discrimination legislation. PP is the representative organisation for Ireland.

== Publications ==
The most recent report from Pavee Point is for 2016.

PP also publishes a wealth of analytical research reports on the conditions of Travellers, which are used as references in academic literature and international legislative bodies.

== See also ==
- Roma in Ireland
- M50 Roma encampment
