= Immigrant Council of Ireland =

- Founded: 2001
- Type: NGO
- Location: Dublin, Ireland
- Fields: Refugees, Immigration, Activism, NGO
- Key people: Brian Killoran (CEO)
- Website: www.immigrantcouncil.ie

The Immigrant Council of Ireland (ICI) is a non-governmental organisation and independent law centre based in Ireland which advises migrants on their rights while advocating for increased migrant protections.

== History ==
Immigrant Council of Ireland (ICI) was founded in 2001 by Social Innovations Ireland.

== Core activities ==
The ICI works to highlight the benefits of immigration to Ireland, and the role that migrants can play in improving Ireland broadly. They advocate for Ireland to uphold all of its obligations under international and EU law, while campaigning for humane and just legislation in Ireland. They publish information for migrants in Ireland to inform them of their rights, such as the Handbook on Immigrants - Rights and Entitlements in Ireland.

Among the core activities of the ICI are the following:

- The provision of advice and practical information on immigration related issues
- As an independent law centre they campaign for reform relating to immigration rights and protections
- They support vulnerable migrants, such as victims of human trafficking
- Facilitate public engagement with integration of immigrants
- Advocate for the inclusion of migrants in Irish life and campaigning against racism

The ICI also conduct research and publish reports and documentation relating to the experiences and treatment of migrants in Ireland. Such reports include Globalisation, Sex Trafficking and Prostitution: The Experiences of Migrant Women in Ireland. They have also partnered with organisations such as Dublin City Council and Transport for Ireland for targeted campaigns such as in 2017 highlighting the racial abuse that can occur on public transport. In 2019, the ICI took over 5,035 calls relating to work permits, EU treaty rights, citizenship, and family reunification.

ICI is one of 7 not-for-profit organisations in Ireland which provide free legal advice, alongside Mercy Law Resource Centre, Ballymun Community Law Centre, the Free Legal Advice Centres, the Irish Refugee Council, the Irish Traveller Movement, and Northside Community Law Centre.

During the COVID-19 pandemic, ICI alongside Nasc, the Sanctuary Runners, Doras, Irish Refugee Council, and the Movement of Asylum Seekers in Ireland, called for all vulnerable and at-risk migrants be removed from Direct Provision centres.
