= Direct provision =

Irish asylum seeker accommodation system

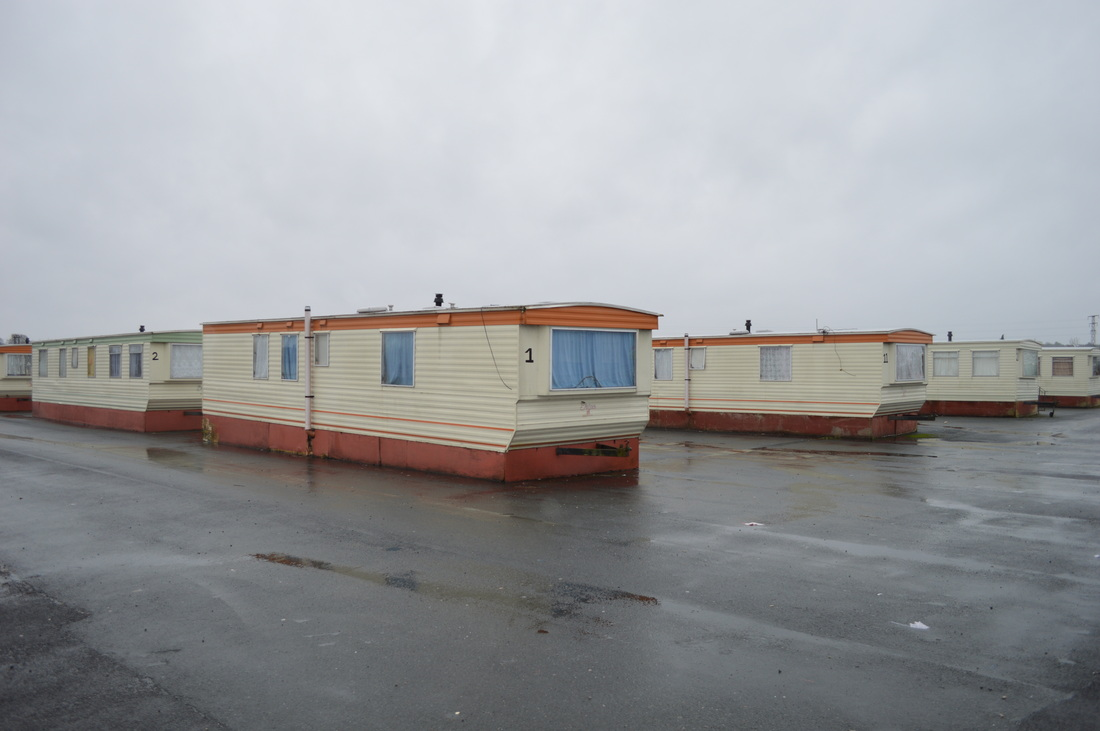
A Direct Provision centre at Lissywollen, Athlone, in 2013 – one of 34 such centres in Ireland.

Direct provision is functionally the system of accommodation for asylum-seekers in the Republic of Ireland. The usage of the term stems from the fact that asylum-seekers are "directly provided for" by the State. It was established in accordance with Ireland's obligations under the E.U. Charter of Fundamental Rights.

== Overview ==
Operated by the International Protection Accommodation Services (IPAS) of the Department of Justice, Home Affairs and Migration, direct provision provides international protection applicants with accommodation and a weekly allowance.

Although asylum-seekers apply for asylum with the International Protection Office (IPO), direct provision itself is handled separately by IPAS. This separation of handling can lead to lapses in care between the time asylum-seeking status is granted, and actual provision is given. In these cases the IPO provides resources on homeless accommodation.

If State provided accommodation is unavailable due to demand, asylum-seekers are qualified for Additional Needs Payments to be able to meet their accommodation needs on their own. Additional Needs Payments are also available to all Irish citizens depending on their need. Additional Needs Payments are considered income and are taxed.

Those within direct provision are given a weekly allowance; called a Daily Expense Allowance. As all necessities are intended to be provided for by the State, this allowance is considered complimentary instead of supplementary. The allowance is considered income and is taxed. As of April 2025 the post-tax rate of allowance is €38.80 per week for an adult and €29.80 per week for a child. An increased rate of €113.80 per week for an adult applies where a person is unaccommodated and is on a waiting list for IPAS accommodation.

International protection applicants in direct provision are entitled to medical care, access to such service requires a medical card which all asylum-seekers can apply for. Such cards are available to Irish citizens as well based on need. The medical card system is operated by HSE.

All children within direct provision have full access to the education system. All children living in Ireland must attend school until they at least turn 16. With adults being provided literacy and language courses. Both adults and children have the opportunity for university grants.

Asylum-seekers in direct provision are not allowed to work until after they have been waiting for 6 months for the IPO to issue its first decision regarding their Asylum status. Once granted permission to work, they do not have to pay international fees to do a Post Leaving Certificate (PLC) course.

Funding for direct provision is allocated by the Irish Government Economic and Evaluation Service (IGEES), but the main source of funding for direct provision is the Asylum, Migration and Integration Fund (AMIF); an E.U. institution. AMIF provides up to 75% of all direct provision funding. The remaining 25% is left up to Ireland. However, AMIF is not the only contributing organization to direct provision funding.

Direct provision has been criticised by human rights organizations, anti-migrant groups, and Eurosceptics. Human rights groups allege direct provision is inhumane and degrading. Anti-migrant groups claim it puts the needs of migrants before those of Irish citizens. Eurosceptics view it as an enforcement of E.U. policy over Irish sovereignty.

== History ==
Direct provision was originally introduced as an emergency measure in 1999-2000 (date disputed) to uphold Ireland's human rights obligations to asylum-seekers in accordance with U.N., but mostly E.U., human rights charters. Before it was introduced asylum-seekers would have to rely on the assistance of local councils, as well as charity, to have their basic needs met. This was a disorganized, uneven system, and led to many abuses and failures to meet the most basic of needs of asylum-seekers. In 2002 there were almost 12,000 applications for asylum. At the start of 2014, there were 4,360 people in direct provision, with more than 3,000 people having been in the system for two or more years. At the same time, there were more than 1,600 people who have spent five or more years in direct provision.

There were approximately 7,400 adults and children living in the 38 direct provision centres across 17 counties in Ireland by the end of April 2020.

In February 2021, the Government of Ireland announced a plan to phase out privately run accommodation centers, which were the source of many past criticisms. Instead by 2024 providing publicly funded, state ran accommodation centers.

== Human rights concerns ==
The length of time people spend in direct provision has been criticised by human rights watchdogs, with the Irish Human Rights and Equality Commission calling the delays faced by asylum applicants as "systemic and pernicious."

In CA v. Minister for Justice and Equality, a claim was made that direct provision was "inhumane and degrading", asserting that the system is illegal under both the Irish Constitution and the European Convention on Human Rights, and all other international human rights conventions that Ireland has subscribed to. This case was vigorously defended by the State on all grounds, including on the basis that it fulfills Ireland's obligations, that it is broadly in line with (and in many cases better than) the situation in other EU states, and that at a time of competing calls for finite resources, it was not feasible for the State to grant the right to work, access to full social welfare and access to the public housing and/or rent supplement to asylum-seekers.

In his judgement on 14 November 2014, Justice Colm Mac Eochaidh found against the applicants on the substantive point of "inhumane and degrading treatment", but struck down the rules at that time regarding unannounced room inspections; the sign-in requirement; the requirement to notify intended absence; the rules on visitors and the lack of an independent complaints procedure. Those points were subsequently addressed. The Irish Government's Special Rapporteur on Child Protection, Dr. Geoffrey Shannon, has called it "institutionalised poverty". Some centres have cooking facilities, but the majority have canteen style eating halls. These have been criticised both for the quality of food, and for the attitude of the canteen workers when it comes to accommodating specific dietary needs. Many child asylum-seekers have been sent here alone while some are born into the direct provision life and that is all they have ever known. In June 2014, there were more than 1,000 asylum cases waiting to be heard in the High Court. The Irish Refugee Council has reported that young people living in direct Provision centres are more prone to depression and suicide, and in the case of three young people in particular, aged between 11 and 17, stated "for different reasons, these three young people have all expressed the view that they can’t see the purpose of living."

According to responses to parliamentary debates and the RIA, the majority of adults in direct provision have had their initial asylum applications rejected and are either appealing this or seeking to remain in Ireland under other criteria.

On October 31, 2018, Donnah Sibanda Vuma asked staff at the direct provision centre in Knockalisheen where she resided for bread and milk for her sick child. The staff refused and told her that they had strict instructions not to give any food outside of canteen hours. The Department of Justice said that the Reception and Integration Agency said it was because of a miscommunication involving a new staff member. The Department of Justice described what happened as "regrettable". Donnah Vuma was living at the centre with her children for four years and had previously criticised direct provision centres for refusing to allow residents to use cooking facilities.

In 2020, direct provision was widely criticised as not conducive to the COVID-19 restrictions on social distancing, self-isolating, and cocooning for those living in its Centres. In particular groups have highlighted the impact on children when there is no access to outdoor or leisure spaces, and the shared facilities with numerous other residents. Some advocacy groups such as Movement of asylum-seekers in Ireland have been involved in Black Lives Matter protests and demonstrations in Ireland highlighting the treatment of people of colour in direct provision. Taoiseach Leo Varadkar responded by commenting that there was no direct comparison between the deaths of black people in the United States and the experiences of those living in direct provision.

Mount Trenchard in Limerick, widely considered "the worst direct provision centre in the country due to poor facilities, overcrowding and isolation", closed in February 2020, after pressure from advocacy groups, including the publication of a report by Doras based upon interviews with residents.

== Health and healthcare ==
In the direct provision system, those seeking asylum in Ireland have access to medical cards. Medical cards are also allocated to low income individuals in Ireland. These cards allow individuals to receive their medical care and prescriptions for free; or at a discounted price. Because many asylum-seekers may face mental health related issues, potentially due to their uncertain future as an asylum-seeker, and having fled persecution or violence in their home country, in addition to any physical health conditions they may have; researchers recommend that asylum-seekers in direct Provision have access to a multidisciplinary healthcare team overseeing their care.

Asylum-seekers are more likely to experience certain mental health conditions than the general population. A 2009 paper from the Irish College of Psychiatrists stated that migrants and asylum-seekers in Ireland are 10x more likely to suffer from PTSD, and 3x more likely to suffer from psychosis. 53% of asylum-seekers in direct provision reported having been tortured before their arrival in Ireland. People in direct provision also experience a variety of stressors that are not as prevalent in the general population including: legal status, a feeling of not being able to parent properly (due to lack of employment and inability to provide transportation for their children), not being able to have a job, uncertainty about involuntary transfers, language barriers, not being able to have access to food at a time when the canteen is not open, nutritional status of the food that is prepared for them, discrimination, and separation from their families or family members.

Owing to the environment at direct provision centres, children living in direct provision are more likely to experience problems related to overcrowding. It has been reported that children in direct provision are more likely to present with burns and stress-related illnesses than children in the general Irish population. Additionally, due to a combination of poverty, deprivation, social isolation, and a stressful environment at home, children and adolescents in direct provision are likely to experience mental health issues. Children in direct provision can experience social isolation due to strict meal times, inability to participate in extracurriculars, visitors being banned from direct provision centres, and lack of transportation to and from friends’ homes. There have also been reports that children in direct provision experience social isolation due to stigma, racism, and bullying. Children who are alone and bored as many in direct provision are, are more likely to experience depression, and it is possible that children developing in a trauma-filled environment will experience cognitive impairment. Children need an environment that is both physically and emotionally safe in order to excel. Health professionals have argued that an environment with inadequately trained professionals and staff, physical abuse, lack of supervision of children, and close contact of many families with young children to unfamiliar adults is not the safe environment that children need.

Room sharing and close contact in direct provision puts asylum-seekers and staff at risk of contracting COVID-19. Many asylum-seekers reported that they found it difficult to follow social distancing measures when sharing amenities like rooms and bathrooms with non-family members. Additionally, because people in direct provision who are able to work often work low-income jobs with conditions that are less than ideal for social distancing, workers and the other people in their direct provision centres are at higher risk for contracting highly communicable illnesses.

== Opposition ==
Direct provision related protests have taken the form of both general protests against the direct provision system, and localised protests against individual proposed direct provision centres. The former are usually organised by the Movement of asylum seekers in Ireland (an advocacy group for asylum-seekers) and anti-racism groups, while the latter have been accused of racism and have seen the involvement of far right groups.

In November 2018, a proposed direct provision centre was firebombed in Moville. The following February, protests against a proposed direct provision centre in Rooskey saw another arson attack on a proposed direct provision centre. In September 2019, Oughterard saw the largest ever protests against a proposed direct provision centre, which was blockaded night and day for three weeks. Another 24/7 protest began on Achill Island the following month, which continued until 2020, the longest ever protest against a direct provision centre. Plans to accommodate asylum-seekers in these four places were dropped. While there have been small protests against direct provision centres since Achill, none have been successful.
