= MasterChef (British TV series) series 21 =

MasterChef
- Series 21
- Presented by: India Fisher; John Torode; Gregg Wallace (first 21 episodes); Anna Haugh (last 2 episodes)
- No. of episodes: 24

Release
- Original network: BBC One
- Original release: 6 August – 26 September 2025

The twenty-first series of MasterChef aired from 6 August 2025 and was narrated by India Fisher. Presented by John Torode, and for most of its run by Gregg Wallace, production was interrupted by Wallace stepping down due to allegations of misconduct and being replaced by Anna Haugh. Broadcast had to wait for a misconduct review to finish. The series was reedited for broadcast and received negative critical reception. Fishmonger Harry Maguire won the series.

== Background ==
MasterChef was first aired in 1990, with Gregg Wallace and John Torode taking over in 2005. In November 2024, midway through filming the twenty-first series, Wallace stepped down after being subjected to 13 allegations of inappropriate sexual misbehaviour. By July 2025, Wallace faced 83 allegations; that month, a report by Lewis Silkin LLP substantiated 45 of them, including one of unwelcome physical contact and three of dressing inappropriately. The same report also found that Torode had used the word nigger in 2018 during an after-show drinks party. For these, both hosts were subsequently fired.

Shortly after the report was published, the BBC announced that they would show the series, for which they were criticised by the Broadcasting, Entertainment, Communications and Theatre Union, the Fawcett Society, and by several accusers. Episodes were edited post hoc to reduce Torode and Wallace's screen time.

The series premiered on 6 August 2025, during a month whose schedule was described that day by The Herald as a "dead zone". India Fisher reprised her regular role as narrator. The show had been planned to premiere that February but delayed until the publication of the report; the short-notice scheduling interrupted the return of Dragons' Den, which had aired its first episode for five months a week earlier. Episodes were usually broadcast on Wednesdays, Thursdays, and Fridays and were an hour, an hour, and half an hour long; however, most weeks' episodes were added to BBC iPlayer on Wednesdays, with the site's MasterChef page displaying a photo of the show's trophy rather than either of the presenters. Wallace had a cold during filming, which left him temporarily croaky.

== Competition ==
Six contestants started most heats, although the fourth, eighth, and ninth episodes featured only five contestants; two contestants including at least one woman were removed post hoc at their request. That said woman had previously called for the series to be axed prompted Ellie Harrison of The Independent to describe her erasure as "a stark reflection of a society in which women are constantly expected to adjust their behaviour for men". A clip from episode four went viral after a TV critic tweeted a 54 second clip in which a single shot of Wallace grinning appeared three times in under a minute.

Heats comprised Basic to Brilliant, a challenge requiring contestants to elevate an everyday kitchen ingredient, and a Mystery Box Challenge, in which unsuccessful Basic to Brilliant contestants were asked to make a dish out of at least one of a selection of ingredients. For the first episode, the Mystery Box ingredients were chocolate, trout, and beetroot; all four went for the same ingredient, a situation Wallace dubbed a "trout-off". The two winners of each challenge faced three former contestants of the show, while the three winners of each episode advanced to quarterfinals, where they cooked for a critic. The 2025 Women's Rugby World Cup delayed the ninth episode by a day.

Knockout Week usually featured three contestants from each week, though four advanced from the second; the sixteen were split into pairs of eight and cooked for a shift in a professional kitchen. The final ten then faced a further challenge, with eight advancing to the semi-finals. The final eight were then split in half to cook at Chawton House in Hampshire, where they were challenged to produce a lunch worthy of the 250th birthday of Jane Austen, whose brother once owned the house; another challenge that week involved Heston Blumenthal instructing chefs to replicate dishes from The Fat Duck. Wallace did not feature after the semi-finals; no on-screen explanation was given.

Four chefs advanced to finals week, all of which featured in the first two episodes. These comprised the Basildon-born post-production assistant colourist Sophie Sugrue, Wandsworth fishmonger Harry Maguire, Swindon vocational trainer Sam Kaeokon, and Doncaster copywriter Claire Syrenne. Unlike previous weeks, only the first two episodes were uploaded to iPlayer before broadcast, and Friday's episode was an hour long. For the antepenultimate episode, the four travelled to Athens in Greece, where they faced three challenges. Anna Haugh, who had previously hosted MasterChef: The Professionals with Wallace and Marcus Wareing, joined from episode 23; she and Grace Dent would subsequently host the show full-time. Maguire beat Sugrue and Syrenne in the final.

== Reception ==
Giles Coren and reviewers for The Times, The Daily Telegraph, and The Irish Times felt that the first episodes suffered for its reduced banter and reviewers for the Evening Standard, The Herald, and The Independent felt uncomfortable watching the programme. Billy Weir of the Belfast Telegraph wrote that admitting to watching the show made him feel like he had "joined that group of people who love peering into people's houses with the curtains open or slowing down to have a gawk at an accident" and BBC Radio Scotland aired a phone-in show debating various facets of the series. The opening episode was watched by 1.96 million viewers overnight, down from the 2.73 million who watched the previous series's premiere; the BBC attributed this to a continuing fall in terrestrial TV ratings and its unusual time of broadcast.
