= Emily Ludolf =

British chef (born 1990)

Emily Ludolf (born 1990 in Lyne, Surrey) is a multi-sensory artist who creates participatory artworks. She first came to public attention as the youngest-ever finalist at 18 years of age when she appeared in the 2008 series of BBC TV show MasterChef, a reality television show for amateur cook. In the finals Ludolf competed against Jonny Stevenson and James Nathan, the latter eventually winning the competition. Ludolf drew media attention after the show was broadcast after having confounded the judges, Gregg Wallace and John Torode, with her own strange culinary inventions, which have later been published in various newspaper and magazine articles.

Ludolf was educated at Gordon's School in Woking, Surrey, and in October 2007 began reading English Literature at Wadham College, the University of Oxford. Since the competition she has written articles on cooking for Delicious Magazine and The Sunday Telegraph, writes a regular restaurant review column for the Oxford University magazine, and writes a cooking blog. In 2011, Ludolf obtained work at London jelly-makers Bompas and Parr. Her job involved creating unusual foods, including dishes for a neon dessert table and for a rabbit cafe. After completing both a bachelor's and master's degree in literature at Oxford, Ludolf then went on to complete a Masters of Research in Art Practice from the University of the Arts, London. Ludolf worked as a research assistant with Tate for 'Art School Educated' project, completed in 2014. Ludolf works as an editor for the Oxford University student newspaper The Cherwell as well as for ETC Magazine.
