= Saliha (name) =

Saliha, Saleha, or Salihe (Arabic: صَلْحَة), is a feminine given name of Arabic origin. Notable people with the name include:

== Given name ==
=== Saleha ===
- Saleha Farooq Etemadi, Afghan politician
- Saleha Jabeen, Indian-American Air Force officer
- Saleha Khanam (1942–2025), Bangladeshi politician
- Saleha Mosharraf (1949–2014), Bangladeshi politician
- Saleha Soadat, Afghan journalist

=== Saliha ===
- Saliha (singer) (1914–1958), Tunisian singer
- Saliha Banu Begum (died 1620), chief consort of Mughal Emperor Jahangir
- Saliha Marie Fetteh (born 1962), Danish writer, lecturer, and imam
- Saliha Abid Hussain (1913–1988), Indian writer of Urdu literature
- Saliha Naciye Kadın (1887–1923), Ottoman noble
- Saliha Mahmood-Ahmed (born 1987), British doctor and chef
- Saliha Raiss (born 1989/90), Belgian politician
- Saliha Şahin (born 1998), Turkish volleyball player
- Saliha Scheinhardt (born 1946), Turkish-German writer and lecturer
- Saliha Sultan (daughter of Abdulaziz) (1862–1941), Ottoman princess, the daughter of Ottoman Sultan Abdulaziz
- Saliha Sultan (daughter of Ahmed III) (1715–1778), Ottoman princess, the daughter of Sultan Ahmed III
- Saliha Sultan (mother of Mahmud I) (1680–1739), Serbian consort of Ottoman Sultan Mustafa II
- Saliha Sultan (daughter of Mahmud II) (1811–1843), Ottoman princess
- Saliha Dilaşub Sultan (1627–1690), consort of Ottoman Sultan Ibrahim

=== Salihe ===
- Salihe Aydeniz (born 1973), Turkish politician
