= Thomas Frake =

British chef

- Born: London, England
- Occupation: Chef
- Years active: 2020–present

Thomas Frake is a British cook and winner of the MasterChef 2020 UK TV show competition.

== Early life ==
Frake (born 1987) was raised in Dartford, Kent. He began cooking at the age of seven and was influenced by his mother and both of his grandmothers. He attended Dartford Grammar School before taking a Broadcast Production degree at the University of Sussex graduating in 2008.

== Masterchef 2020 ==
His final menu was to prepare a three-course meal for judges John Torode and Gregg Wallace. Frake's winning menu consisted of:

- First course: Monk fish Scampi – Monk fish tails in a beer batter, flavoured with smoked Paprika and Cayenne pepper, pickled Fennel, gherkins and onions and Tartare sauce topped with Tarragon
- Main course: Ox cheek braised in black treacle, bone marrow and Porter with crispy onions, shredded Brussels sprouts with bacon, carrots cooked in carrot juice and topped with onion seeds and Horseradish mash all served in the Ox cheek braising juices
- Dessert: Salted caramel custard tart, topped with grated Nutmeg, caramel and orange zest popcorn and a popcorn ice cream.

Preceded by Irini Tzortzoglou	BBC Masterchef champion 2020	Succeeded by Tom Rhodes
