= Ping Coombes =

British chef

- Born: Ping Wan; 19 February 1981 (age 45); Ipoh, Malaysia
- Occupation: Chef
- Years active: 2014–present
- Spouse: Andrew Coombes (m. 2006)
- Children: 2
- Website: https://www.pingcoombes.com/

Ping Coombes is a British cook and winner of 2014's MasterChef competition broadcast on BBC One.

== Early life ==
Coombes is of Malaysian Chinese heritage and was raised in Ipoh, Malaysia. Although she was surrounded and influenced by wonderful food around her, she drew her inspiration from her mother. She moved to the UK to study at Oxford in 2000. Only after arriving in the UK did she begin to experiment with Malaysian food. She lives just outside Bath with her husband Andrew and their daughters Alexa and Luna and divides her time between Bath and London.

== MasterChef ==
Before joining MasterChef, Coombes worked as an assistant hotel manager for a private hospital. After being made redundant, Coombes entered MasterChef to do something fun.

Her final menu was to prepare a three-course meal for judges John Torode and Gregg Wallace. Coombes' winning menu consisted of:

- First course: a Chicken and Shitake Mushroom Broth, with Pork and Crab Dumplings wrapped with Egg Noodles topped with Crispy Wanton Skins served with braised Chinese Leaves and Enoki Straw Mushrooms, Pickled Shimeji Mushrooms and Pickled Green Chillies
- Main course: Nasi Lemak, Coconut and Pandan Rice with Spicy Sambal Lemongrass Prawns, Turmeric Fried Chicken coated in Spanish Potato Crisps served with a Sambal with Deep Fried Anchovies, Crispy Shallots, Cucumber, Quails Eggs and Edible Flowers
- Dessert: Coconut and Vanilla Pannacotta with Charred Pineapple, Compressed and Freeze-Dried Mango, Coconut Tuille and a Pineapple and Lime Air.

== Career ==
Since winning MasterChef in 2014, Coombes, working under the name Ping's Pantry, has made several appearances at food festivals and various restaurants. She launched street food classes in Fulham in 2017.

In November 2015, she was appointed Consultant Chef for the Ping Pan-Asian group in November 2015. The first restaurant called Chi Kitchen is situated within The Selfridges Kitchen at Selfridges department store in Oxford Street, London. There is also the Ping Pan-Asian delicatessen in the Selfridges Foodhall.

She has also appeared in John Torode's Malaysian Adventure and has been guest chef on popular daytime talk shows such as This Morning, and Sunday Brunch. She was invited to appear as a guest judge on MasterChef 2019.

Coombes became Malaysia Kitchen Ambassador in 2016, promoting Malaysian food and cuisine around the UK and abroad.

Her first book Malaysia was published in May 2016.

Preceded by Natalie Coleman	MasterChef UK champion 2014	Succeeded by Simon Wood
