= Jackie Kearney =

British cook

Jackie Kearney is a British cook specialising in vegetarian and vegan street food, drawing especially from Asian cuisine. Kearney works as a chef and food development consultant, as well as running The Hungry Gecko dining club. She has a food trailer called Barbarella, and has published several vegan cookbooks.

== Career ==
Kearney worked for the National Institute for Health and Care Excellence before taking a year-long trip around South East Asia. Upon her return, she was a finalist in the British television cookery competition MasterChef. Kearney participated in the 2011 series of the programme, finishing fourth. The Hungry Gecko, Kearney's dining club, was established in the same year, and she launched food truck called Barbarella. With her vegetarian street food truck, Kearney was a finalist in the British Street Food Awards in 2012.

Kearney went on to publish her first book, Vegan Street Food, in 2015. Though she is a vegetarian, not a vegan, the book ended up being predominantly vegan, and she removed the non-vegan elements at her publisher's suggestion. The book won the PETA UK Vegan Food Award for Cookbook of the Year 2016. Further vegan cookbooks followed, including books focused on comfort food, mock meat, and Christmas food.

== Critical response ==
Kearney's books have been reviewed by critics. In 2018, Coach Mag named Vegan Street Food one of the Best Vegan Cookbooks. In reviewing Vegan Christmas Feasts, the American journalist Avery Yale Kamila said "Kearney calls upon her British heritage and her travels for a collection of celebratory recipes that feel nostalgic yet a wee bit novel". The journalist Selene Nelson listed My Vegan Travels on a list of her three favorite vegan cookbooks. In 2016, the MasterChef winner Tim Anderson said he was cooking from Vegan Street Food.

== Books ==
- Vegan Street Food: Foodie Travels from India to Indonesia (2015, Ryland Peters & Small)
- My Vegan Travels: Comfort Food Inspired by Adventure (2017, Ryland Peters & Small)
- Vegan Mock Meat Revolution: Delicious Plant-Based Recipes (2018, Ryland Peters & Small)
- Vegan Christmas Feasts: Inspired Meat-Free Recipes for the Festive Season (2019, Ryland Peters & Small)
- Plant-based Burgers: And Other Vegan Recipes for Dogs, Subs, Wings and More (2022, Ryland Peters & Small)
- Healthy Vegan Street Food: Sustainable & Healthy Plant-Based Recipes from India to Indonesia (2022, Ryland Peters & Small)
