= Irini Tzortzoglou =

British-Greek chef (born 1958)

- Born: Irini Tzortzoglou; 12 February 1958 (age 68); Crete, Greece
- Occupations: Chef, Writer, Olive Oil Sommelier
- Years active: 2018–present
- Website: https://irinicooks.com/

Irini Tzortzoglou is a Greek cook and winner of the MasterChef 2019 UK TV show competition.

Her final challenge was to prepare a three-course meal for judges John Torode and Gregg Wallace. Tzortzoglou's winning menu consisted of:

- First course: Red mullet with a squid risotto, confit tomatoes, a rosemary and garlic sauce with bottarga (grey mullet roe) and an aged balsamic foam
- Main course: Griddled rosemary lamb chops with trahanas puree (cracked wheat cooked in soured milk), peas, confit herb tomatoes, pearl onions, crumbled feta and a lamb and tomato jus
- Dessert: Fig and hazelnut baklava with roasted honeyed fig topped with Chantilly cream and candied fig, a fig leaf ice-cream and syrup on a hazelnut crumble

Her first book Under the Olive Tree: Recipes from my Greek Kitchen was published on 23 July 2020.

== Early life ==
Tzortzoglou was born in 1958 and was raised in a small village on the island of Crete, Greece. Her family moved to Athens for the children to get an education but her father's premature death when she was 20 years old meant that she moved back to Crete where she worked in her uncle's hotel, where she met her first husband who was English and moved to London with him.

She began her career in banking with the National Bank of Greece in London. Her career in banking lasted nearly thirty years and she became involved in numerous activities including theatre work with the London Greek Theatre Group, professional qualification studies and a History of Art, Architecture and Design Degree at Kingston University. In 2000, she married her second husband John and moved to the small village of Cartmel in Cumbria.

Her Greek upbringing and family influence with food and cooking inspired her to enter MasterChef.

In January 2020, Tzortzoglou became an Olive Oil Sommelier.

== Publications ==
- Under the Olive Tree: Recipes from my Greek Kitchen (2020)

Preceded by Kenny Tutt	BBC Masterchef champion 2019	Succeeded by Thomas Frake
