= Saliha Mahmood-Ahmed =

British chef

Dr Saliha Mahmood-Ahmed
- Born: Saliha Mahmood-Ahmed; 23 October 1987 (age 39); Mansfield, England, UK
- Occupations: Doctor; chef
- Years active: 2017–present
- Website: Official website

Dr Saliha Mahmood-Ahmed (born 23 October 1987) is a British doctor, chef and winner of the BBC's MasterChef competition in 2017. Saliha is a Sunday Times bestselling author.

Her final menu was to prepare a three-course meal for judges John Torode and Gregg Wallace which consisted of:

- First course: Venison shami kebab with cashew and coriander green chutney, chana daal and a kachumbar salad.
- Main course: Kashmiri style sous-vide duck breast, with crispy duck skin, freekeh wheatgrain, spiced with dried barberries, walnuts and coriander, a cherry chutney and a duck and cherry sauce.
- Dessert: Saffron rosewater and cardamom panna cotta, served with a deconstructed baklava, including candied pistachios, pistachio honeycomb, filo pastry shards and kumquats.

== Early life ==
Mahmood-Ahmed was born in Mansfield, Notts and raised in Ickenham, Middlesex. She is of Kashmiri descent.

== Career ==
She was educated at Beaconsfield High School (Grammar School) for girls and studied medicine at Kings College, graduating in 2012. She was awarded a Merit in Clinical Medicine and Special Study as part of her degree and awarded the Associate of Kings College Prize. She began her career in medicine as a junior doctor working for the NHS at St Mary's Hospital specialising in gastroenterology. She has subsequently worked at Hillingdon Hospital, Watford General Hospital, Northwick Park Hospital and Charing Cross Hospital. Saliha has worked as a specialist registrar in gastroenterology since 2017 in North West London Deanery and is working toward becoming a consultant in this speciality. She has completed a master's in clinical obesity and nutrition at UCL, for which she was awarded the prestigious 'Deans List' prize.

She began cooking at the age of 12 and was heavily influenced by the Kashmiri style of cooking of her maternal grandmother and mother.

== Publications ==
- Khazana – A Treasure Trove of Modern Mughal Dishes (2018). Awarded Best New Cookbook by The Guardian (2019)

Foodology- a food lovers guide to digestive health and happiness (2020) Hodder, Yellow Kite The Kitchen Prescription (2022) Hodder, Yellow Kite The 20 Minute Gut Health Fix (Feb 2025) Hodder, Yellow Kite

== Personal life ==
Mahmood-Ahmed has been married to Usman Ahmed since August 2013. Her husband is a Consultant in Acute Medicine at Hillingdon Hopital. Their first son, Aashir, was born in October 2014 and their second in March 2020.

Preceded by Jane Devonshire	MasterChef UK champion 2017	Succeeded by Kenny Tutt
