= Tzortzoglou =

Tzortzoglou (Greek: Τζώρτζογλου) is a Greek surname. Notable people with the surname include:

- Irini Tzortzoglou (born 1958), Greek cook
- Stratos Tzortzoglou (born 1965), Greek actor
