= Anna Haugh =

Irish chef (born 1980)

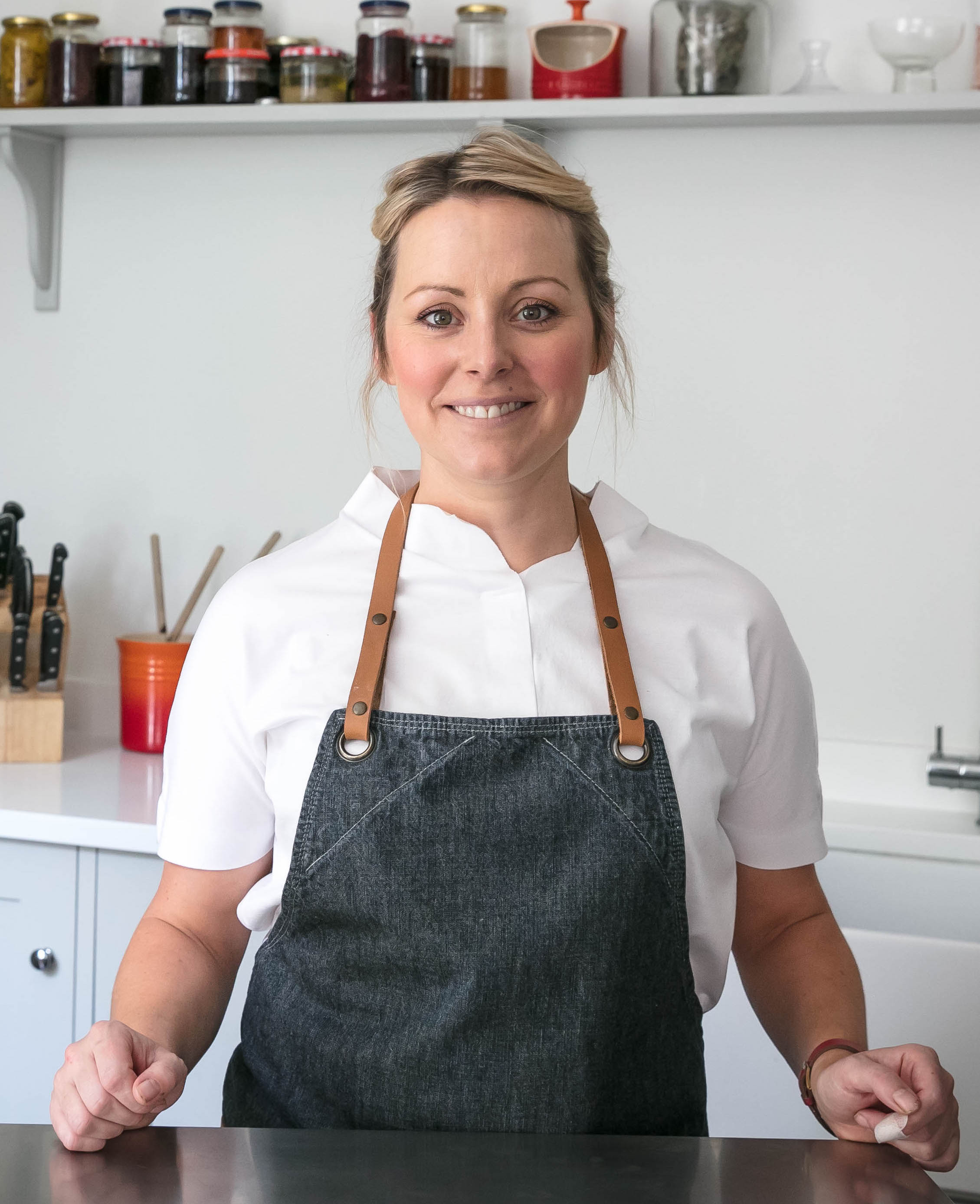
- Born: 6 November 1980 (age 45); Dublin, Ireland
- Culinary career
- Current restaurant(s): Myrtle, Anna Haugh at Conrad Dublin
- Website: myrtlerestaurant.com

Anna Haugh (/ˈhɔː/, HAW; born 6 November 1980) is an Irish chef, restaurateur and TV personality. Since 2025, she has co-presented the BBC's MasterChef alongside Grace Dent.

== Biography ==
Born in Dublin, Haugh grew up in Tallaght. She attended Presentation Secondary School in Terenure and trained on a professional cookery course at the TU Dublin School of Culinary Arts and Food Technology in Dublin. She began her career in the city, with Derry Clarke of L'Ecrivain. Haugh then moved to London where she worked with Philip Howard, Shane Osborn and Gordon Ramsay. Haugh also worked with Gualtiero Marchesi in Paris.

In May 2019, she founded the Myrtle Restaurant in Chelsea, London, named after Myrtle Allen, Irish Michelin star-winning head chef and co-founder of Ballymaloe House.

== Media career ==
Haugh's first documented role in television was in BBC's The Stress Test (2004) while working at Pied à Terre with Shane Osborn. She appeared as a guest judge on Gordon Ramsay's U.S. show Hell's Kitchen in 2013 and was a chef on BBC's Ready Steady Cook presented by Rylan Clark-Neal.

Haugh co-presented two seasons of BBC's Royal Recipes with Michael Buerk, has appeared as a guest judge on Masterchef with John Torode and Gregg Wallace and as a guest on Sunday Brunch with Simon Rimmer and Tim Lovejoy. She has also appeared as a guest on Tastemade with Numra Siddiqui.

In 2020, Anna competed in and won an episode of Channel 4's Snackmasters against Michelin restaurant chef Aktar Islam.

Anna regularly appears on Saturday Kitchen and is a resident chef on Morning Live with Kym Marsh and Gethin Jones.

Haugh was the guest chef who set the dish challenges for the contestants on the BBC's Celebrity Masterchef, in the 11th episode (Series 17) which was broadcast in September 2022. The contestants in the episode were Lisa Snowdon, Kitty Scott-Claus, Katya Jones and Ryan Thomas.

In 2022, Haugh replaced Monica Galetti as a judge on Masterchef: The Professionals, for the fifteenth series only.

In March 2023, Anna was co-host of Grilled, a podcast by The Staff Canteen, where she interviewed a number of hospitality personalities including presenter Leyla Kazim and Saturday Kitchen's Matt Tebbutt.

In 2024, Haugh opened a wine bar called The Little Sister at the chef's Myrtle restaurant in London.

In early 2025, Haugh presented a fifteen-part cookery series called Anna Haugh's Big Irish Food Tour, which aired on BBC One Northern Ireland.

In September 2025, the BBC announced that Haugh and Grace Dent would be the co-presenters and judges on Masterchef from the 22nd series, taking over from Gregg Wallace and John Torode.

== Awards ==
In 2019, Haugh won Best International Chef award at the Food & Wine Ireland awards.

Myrtle Restaurant, located on Chelsea's Langton Street in London, was awarded 3 AA Rosettes in 2021.

== Books ==
- Cooking with Anna (Bloomsbury Publishing, 2024) ISBN 9781526667212
