= Borderless =

Borderless may refer to:

- Borderless (Cameron Cartio album), 2006
- Borderless (Rihwa album), 2014
- Borderless Magazine, a non-profit online magazine based in Chicago
- "Borderless", a 1990 song by Shirley Kwan
- Borderless: A Docu-Drama About the Lives of Undocumented Workers, a 2006 documentary by Dionne Brand
- Borderless, a 2009 film by Brooke Hanson awarded at Naperville Independent Film Festival
- Borderless, a 2019 documentary by Lauren Southern
- Borderless, a 2010 gospel reggae album by Sherwin Gardner
- borderless, a docu-series hosted by Stephan Said

== See also ==
- Without Borders, a 2015 Russian comedy film
