= Ibn Budayr =

18th century popular historian in Damascus

- شهاب الدين أحمد بن بُدير
- Born: c. 1701 CE / 1112 or 1113 AH al-Qubaybāt, Syria
- Died: 1762 CE / 1175 AH; Damascus, Syria
- Other name: al-Budayri al-Hallaq
- Occupation: Barber
- Years active: 1741 or 1742 — 1762 CE / 1154 — 1175 AH
- Era: 18th century
- Known for: Author of popular history
- Notable work: Historical Chronicle: Hawadith Damashq al Yawmiyya "Daily Events of Damascus"

Shihab al-Din Ahmad Ibn Budayr al-Hallaq (Arabic: شهاب الدين أحمد بن بُدير), otherwise known as Ibn Budayr and al Budayri the Barber (Arabic: بديري الحلاق), c. 1701 — 1761 CE / 1112 or 1113 — 1175 AH, was a barber and popular historian from Damascus during Ottoman rule. He is most known for authoring a historical chronicle titled: "The Daily Events of Damascus" (Arabic: حوادث دمشق اليومية romanized: Hawadith Damashq al Yawmiyya).

== Early life ==
Born in the neighborhood al-Qubaybāt (Arabic: القبيبات), located about one kilometer southwest of Damascus and along the route to Mecca, Ibn Budayr grew up outside of the sphere of "high culture" and economic privilege. He descended from a family of 'akkām (Arabic: عكام), porters who served wealthy clients on the pilgrimage to Mecca, and would have grown up on modest means. (Note: For more on the lives of porters on the road to Mecca, see Muḥammad Sa`īd al-Qāsimī's "Dictionary of Damascene Crafts" (Arabic: قـامـوس الـصـنـاعـات الـشـامـيـة Romanized: Qāmūs al-ṣinā`āt al-shāmiyya), Milwright, Marcus (2022). Islamic Arts and Crafts: An Anthology. Edinburgh: Edinburgh University Press. ISBN 978-1-4744-0917-9., and Milwright, Marcus (2018). The Arts and Crafts of Syria and Egypt from the Ayyubids to World War I: Collected Essays. Piscataway, NJ: Gorgias Press. ISBN 978-1-4632-4007-3.) Some prestige was allotted to his father and male relatives working as 'akkām for completing the Hajj several times, earning them the title hajji (Arabic: الحجّي; romanized: Hajji, Hajjeh, Hadji, Haji, Alhaji, Al-Hadj, Al-Haj or El-Hajj). But Ibn Budayr and his family held very little social status in the Damascus hierarchy. While we know little about his father, he mentions his mother and two children in his chronicle, a daughter named Saliha (Arabic: صلحة), and a son involved in religious studies.

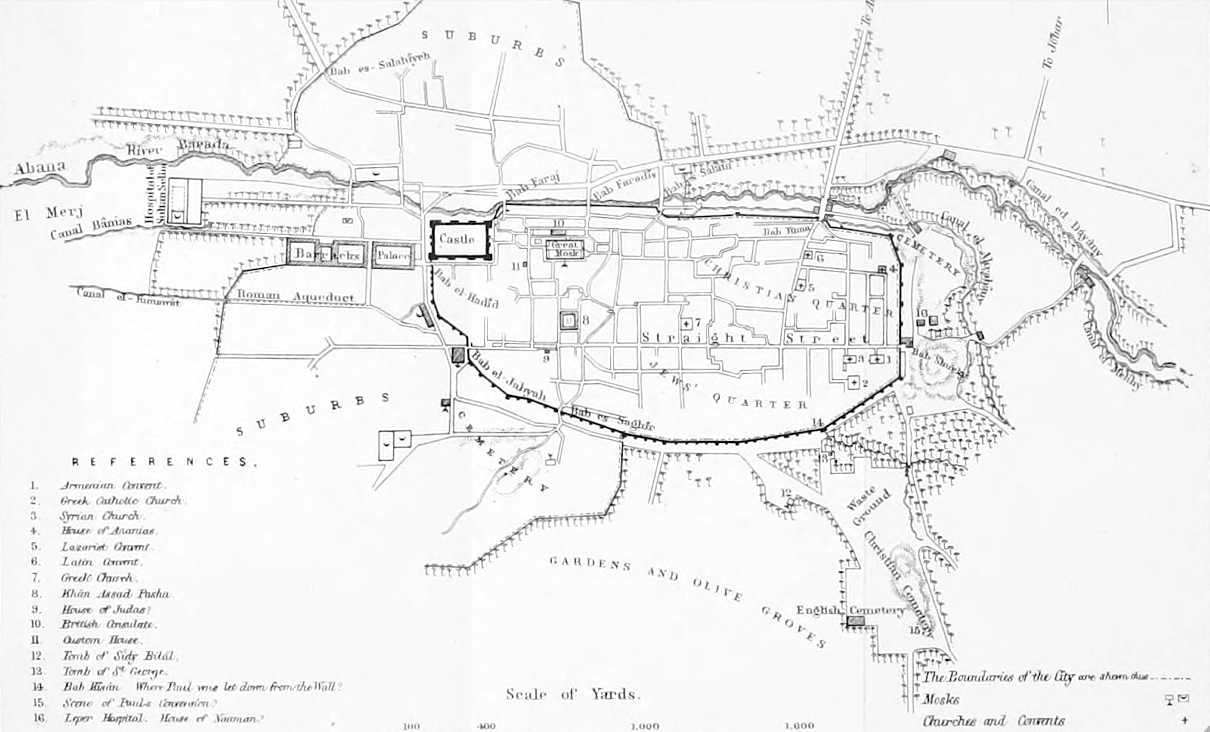
19th century map of Damascus published by Irish Presbyterian minister J. L. Porter

After the death of his father, (Note: Sajdi and the manuscripts edited by al-Qāsimī dissagree over the profession of Ibn Budayr's father. Sajdi reports that his father was a porter. al-Qāsimī and many subsequent editors of his version of the chronicle, however, conclude that his father could have been a barber, explaining Ibn Budayr's career as a barber in Damascus. Despite the fact that a profession was usually passed from father to son, Sajdi speculates that the sheer danger and arduous nature of working as a porter may have spurred Ibn Budayr to find a less taxing and perhaps more elevated profession) Ibn Budayr and his family moved to al-Ta`dīl (Arabic: التعديل), a neighborhood in the southwestern section of Damascus that was deeply integrated in local Damascene commerce and culture. (Note: Schilcher claims that the "Localist Area" was particularly well suited to accepting Arabic speaking migrants and would have offered avenues for Ibn Budayr to integrate into the local economy. New residents settled in the Localist Area to take advantage of cheap housing and work opportunities. Often times the people and needs of the Localist Area were opposed to those of the Central, Ottoman area.) al-Ta'dīl was most likely a relatively affluent neighborhood in this area. The Localist Area also had a large Sufi presence as well as a high concentration of cafés, mosques, madrasas (Arabic: singular, مدراسة plural مدراسات "school or college"), and bath houses, which drew significant traffic from the peasant class and Bedouin tribes. The number of cultural, educational, and religious establishments in the area rivaled the upper-class city center.

As a child, Ibn Budayr apprenticed at a barbershop owned by Aḥmad Ibn al-Ḥashīsh (Arabic: أحمد بن الحشيش) that served local elites, such as Shaykh `Abd al-Ghanī al-Nābulusī (Arabic: الشيخ عبد الغني بن النابلسي). He eventually established his own barbershop in the neighborhood Bāb al-Barīd (Arabic: باب البدرث) located in the wealthy center of Damascus.

=== Education ===
He studied the Quran, theology, jurisprudence, grammar, and religious sciences under three prominent Damascene scholars. Two of his teachers frequently taught and studied at the famed Umayyad Mosque (Arabic: ألجامع ٱلأموي, romanized: al-Jāmiʿ al-Umawī).

=== Sufism ===
Phrases Ibn Budayr includes in his writing indicate a sophisticated understanding of Sufism and mysticism that goes beyond basic familiarity. He was a member of the Qādiriyya (Arabic: القادرية) order, notably popular amongst scholars in Damascus. Ibn Budayr's choice to join the Qādiriyya was heavily influenced by his teacher Aḥmad al-Sābiq (Arabic: أحمد السابق).

== "The Daily Events of Damascus" ==
Ibn Budayr's chronicle stands apart from other histories of the time because for its rare depiction of the lives of commoners. Historically, the 'ulamā (Arabic: علماء), a wealthy, educated class of religious scholars, controlled the dissemination of written knowledge in Islamic society. During the 18th century, the 'ulamā began shifting away from historical chronicles to focus on subjects such as law, poetry, and ṭabaqāt (Arabic: طبقات) literature. These transformations opened space for historical literature produced by non-elites.

Hawadith Damashq al Yawmiyya "Daily Events of Damascus" reports on experiences from the perspective of the common people. The chronicle casts the social dynamic of Damascus as a battle between the "tyrannical rich and an oppressed poor. Ibn Budayr documents the failure of the qādī (Arabic: قاضي) and Governor As'ad Pasha al-Azm (Arabic: أسعد باشا العظم) to protect the working class from violence and extortion. He implicates several ulamā in artificially driving up wheat prices by hoarding supplies. He also reports on a series of bread riots that occurred in the 1740s, which escalated into armed confrontations and forced the qādī to flee Damascus for several weeks.

In the early 2000s, allegedly un-edited manuscript was discovered at Chester Beaty Library in Dublin by Shahab Ahmed, a scholar of Islam at Harvard University. Prior to this discovery, historians have relied on a heavily edited version of Ibn Budayr's manuscript compiled by Muḥammad Sa^{c}īd al-Qāsimī, the father of the prominent 19th century Syrian Islamic scholar Jamal al-Din bin al-Qasimi (Arabic: جمال الدين القاسمي; 1866 – 1914).
