= Riyadh Khalaf =

Irish broadcaster and author

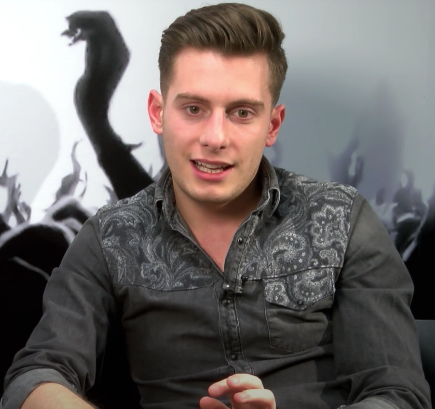
- Khalaf in 2015
- Born: 7 February 1991 (age 35); Bray, County Wicklow, Ireland
- Other name: Riyadh K
- Education: Ballyfermot College of Further Education
- Occupations: Broadcaster, author, activist, YouTuber
- Years active: 2008–present
- Notable work: Growing Up Gay; Queer Britain

Riyadh Khalaf (born 7 February 1991) is an Irish broadcaster, author, activist, and YouTube personality who has worked in the media industry in Ireland, Australia and the UK.

== Early life ==
Born to Irish mother Lorraine and Iraqi father Sam, Khalaf is from Bray, County Wicklow. He attended Newpark Comprehensive School in Blackrock. Having not done well on his Leaving Certificate, he decided to pursue a career in media. He started his own pirate radio station at the age of 16. He studied at Dún Laoghaire Further Education Institute and Ballyfermot College of Further Education, graduating with a Bachelor of Arts in Media Production Management.

== Career ==
Khalaf began his YouTube channel whilst still in school, although his videos prior to 2013 are no longer available. During his studies at Ballyfermot, Khalaf landed radio gigs at Dublin's 98FM and SPIN 1038. Khalaf featured in the 2010 RTÉ One documentary series Growing Up Gay in which he discussed coming out to his at the time Catholic mother and Muslim father. The same year he took part in the Irish version of Young, Dumb and Living Off Mum that was broadcast on TV3. He also presented for Ireland's first temporary LGBT+ radio station, Open FM. He reported for RTÉ's Two Tube in 2012 and in 2013 for KIIS 106.5 in Sydney and KIIS 101.1 in Melbourne. Khalaf publicly campaigned for marriage equality (the "Yes vote") in the 2015 Irish constitutional referendums. His family's cars were attacked with acid in response.

Upon relocating to London in 2016, Khalaf briefly worked as a video producer for MailOnline. In 2017, Khalaf presented the six-part BBC Three documentary series Queer Britain and was an interviewer for Pride in London's Love Happens Here YouTube series. He produced and presented a short documentary I Am... in 2017. In May 2018, he began hosting a NSFW chat podcast Unexpected Fluids for BBC Radio 1 with Alix Fox. Khalaf created and uploaded Fighting for Pride: Swaziland, a documentary to his YouTube channel as part of #CreatorsForChange in 2018. Since November 2018, Khalaf has been a relief presenter on BBC Radio 1.

In 2019, Khalaf published his debut novel Yay! You're Gay! Now What? A Gay Boy's Guide to Life. That December, he took part in Celebrity Mastermind.

Khalaf's other presenting work includes the YouTube Red event Stream #WithMe to raise money for the NHS during the COVID-19 pandemic and a BBC Sounds podcast, Obsessed with... Normal People, with Evanna Lynch. He has periodically done work with BBC Radio 1 and guest presented The One Show.

Khalaf won the 15th series of BBC One's Celebrity MasterChef in 2020. He dedicated his semi-final dishes to his father.

== Personal life ==
Khalaf moved to London in 2016. He has two cats named Claire and Luca, and a duck named Spike, whom he rescued.

== Bibliography ==
- Riyadh Khalaf (2019). Yay! You're Gay! Now What? A Gay Boy's Guide to Life. Frances Lincoln Children's Books. ISBN 978-1786031914.

== Filmography ==
Year	Title	Role	Notes
2010	Growing Up Gay	Participant	
2010	Young, Dumb and Living Off Mum	Participant	Irish version
2012	Two Tube	Reporter	
2017	Queer Britain	Presenter	
2019	Celebrity Mastermind	Contestant	Series 17, Episode 2
2020	Celebrity MasterChef	Contestant	Winner (series 15)
2020	The One Show	Guest presenter	With Alex Jones; 1 episode

== Audio ==
Year	Title	Role
2018–19	Unexpected Fluids	Co-presenter
2020	Obsessed with... Normal People	Co-presenter
2022	Obsessed with... Conversations with Friends	Co-presenter
