= Yulchon =

Yulchon LLC
- Headquarters: Seoul, South Korea
- No. of offices: 7
- No. of attorneys: Approx. 600 (including attorneys licensed outside of Korea)
- Major practice areas: Full-service
- Key people: Seok-hoon Kang, Managing Partner
- Revenue: Approximately US$270 million
- Date founded: 1997
- Website: yulchon.com

- Yulchon
- Hangul: 율촌
- Hanja: 律村
- Lit.: Law Village
- RR: Yulchon
- MR: Yulch'on

Yulchon LLC is a full-service international corporate law firm headquartered in Seoul, South Korea that was founded in 1997. Initially known as Woo Yun Kang Jeong & Han, the firm changed its name to Yulchon in 2007. Currently, Yulchon employs more than 600 fee earners, including more than 60 licensed in jurisdictions outside of Korea. The firm offers services in the following practice areas: corporate & finance, tax, antitrust, real estate and construction, dispute resolution, and intellectual property.

The firm is widely recognized as one of the top law firms in Korea (5th largest by numbers of attorneys licensed in Korea and 4th in terms of revenue). Yulchon's revenue for the year of 2024 was approximately US$270 million. Most recently, Yulchon ranked 1st in 13 out of 14 categories among all Korean firms in a survey conducted by a leading Korean legal publication (법률신문)."

Internationally, Yulchon was selected as the most innovative law firm in South Korea by the Financial Times in 2015 and 2016. In addition, it was recognized as "South Korea Law Firm of the Year" by Chambers & Partners in 2017. In particular, Yulchon is well known for its strong tax practice, winning the award of "South Korea Tax Firm of the Year" at the International Tax Review's Asia Tax Awards 2020.

In July 2013, Yulchon joined Ius Laboris, the international law firm network specialized in employment law.

== Main practice areas ==
Yulchon's main practice areas are:

- Antitrust
- Corporate and finance
- Real estate & construction
- Dispute resolution
- Labor & Employment
- Intellectual property
- Tax
- Overseas investment
- Industry

== Offices ==
- Korea (Seoul, Headquarters): Parnas Tower 38F, 521 Teheran-ro, Samsung-dong, Gangnam-gu, Seoul 06164
- Vietnam (Ho Chi Minh City): Unit 03, 4th Floor, Kumho Asiana Plaza, 39 Le Duan St., Ben Nghe Ward, Dist.1, Ho Chi Minh City, Vietnam
- Vietnam (Hanoi): Suite 2502, Keangnam Hanoi Landmark Tower, Pham Hung Street, Tu Liem District, Hanoi, Vietnam
- China (Beijing): 9F, SK Tower, No.6 jia, Jianguomenwai Avenue, Chaoyang District, Beijing 100022, P.R. China
- Myanmar (Yangon): Unit 6, 7F, Tower 1, HAGL Myanmar Centre Tower, 192, Kabar Aye Pagoda Road, Bahan Township, Yangon, Myanmar
- Russia (Moscow): 12th Fl. White Gardens Business Center, 7 Ulitsa Lesnaya, Moscow, Russian Federation, 125047
- Indonesia (Jakarta): The Energy, 32nd Floor, SCBD Lot 11A, Jalan Jenderal Sudirman, Kav. 52–53, Jakarta 12190, Indonesia
