= James Nathan =

British game show competitor

James Nathan is a British barrister, best known as the winner of the BBC's MasterChef 2008, having beaten Emily Ludolf and Jonny Stevenson in the grand final.

== Early life ==
Nathan was educated at Millfield in Somerset and Tockington Manor School in Bristol. He trained as a barrister and has a passion for food and cooking from an early age.

== Career ==
Along with his first wife Linsey Stroud, James was co-author of The Trailrider Guide - Spain: Single Track Mountain Biking in Spain. Nathan practised criminal law in Bristol for two years before moving to Spain with the intention of opening a restaurant.

He has worked at Richard Corrigan’s restaurant, Bentleys Oyster Bar in Piccadilly, Michael Caines’ Michelin-starred Bath Priory in Bath and at Rick Stein's Seafood Restaurant in Padstow, Cornwall.

From 2013 to 2016, he ran his own restaurant, The Green Room, at The Retallack Resort near Padstow, Cornwall.

In March 2016, James took over from Nathan Outlaw as Head Chef at The St Enodoc Hotel in Rock, Cornwall. In 2019 he became Head Chef at the Clifton Lido Restaurant, Clifton, Bristol

Preceded by Steven Wallis	MasterChef UK champion 2008	Succeeded by Mat Follas
