= Saleha Soadat =

Saleha Soadat is an Afghan journalist. She reported for TOLOnews and Kabul Pressistan, and was a candidate in the 2018 parliamentary elections. After the Taliban seized power in 2021, she fled Afghanistan. She is a freelance journalist with Borderless Magazine magazine.

== Life ==
Soadat was born and raised in Kabul. She studied journalism at Kabul University, and worked in print, radio and television in Afghanistan. She became a regular evening news presenter at TOLOnews, a private news channel in Kabul. In 2013 the Afghanistan Senate named her Journalist of the Year, and in 2014 the Afghanistan Parliament named her Best Reporter.

In 2015 Soadat was expelled from her job with TOLOnews, after sharing a tweet about a Taliban killing of local police officers in Jalrez District, Maidan Wardak Province.

Soadat stood as a candidate in the 2018 Afghan parliamentary election.

After the Taliban seized power in 2021, Soadat fled Afghanistan. She was evacuated on American military aircraft in August 2021 and eventually made it to the United States. After being processed at Fort McCoy in Wisconsin, she settled in Chicago and became a Pathways Reporting Fellow at Borderless Magazine, based in Chicago. In 2022 she continued her education through the Texas International Education Consortium, studying mass communication at Texas Tech University College of Media & Communication. In March 2024, Teas Tech University honored her with an Excellence in International Journalism award.
