= Jane Devonshire =

British chef (born 1966)

- Born: Jane Devonshire; 15 April 1966 (age 60); London, England
- Occupation: Chef
- Years active: 2016–present
- Spouse: Mark Devonshire (m. 1995)
- Children: 4
- Website: Official website

Jane Devonshire (born 15 April 1966) is a British chef and winner of MasterChef in 2016.

== Career ==
Devonshire grew up in London. From an early age food and cooking were a fundamental part of family life. Her childhood influences came from her mother and especially her nanny Pearce who baked beautiful cakes and dishes.

She has presented at numerous food and drink shows around the UK, including the BBC Good Food show and made several television appearances including BBC Breakfast and Woman’s Hour.

== Personal life ==
Devonshire is married to Mark, and they have four children, Sam, Rebecca, Harry, and Ben. Her son Ben was diagnosed with Coeliac disease aged two. Because of her son's diagnosis she devoted herself to cooking and preparing gluten free meals. She has subsequently written two gluten free cookery books and Coeliac UK appointed Devonshire as its new ambassador who will spearhead the national charity’s Awareness Week 2020.

Devonshire has twice been diagnosed with cancer and is now in remission. She supports two cancer charities which are very close to her heart, Ark Cancer Charity and The Haven.

== Publications ==
- Hassle Free, Gluten Free (2018)
- Vegetarian Hassle Free, Gluten Free (2020)

Preceded by Simon Wood	MasterChef UK champion 2016	Succeeded by Saliha Mahmood-Ahmed
