= Simon Wood (chef) =

British chef (born 1976)

- Born: Simon Wood; 6 July 1976 (age 50); Chadderton, Oldham, England
- Occupation: Chef
- Years active: 2014–present
- Children: 4

Simon Wood is a British cook and winner of the 2015 edition of MasterChef competition.

== Career ==
After winning MasterChef in 2015, Wood was appointed executive chef of the Oldham Event Centre (part of Oldham Athletic Football Club) where he worked across fine dining events in the club and masterclasses. He subsequently opened a pop-up restaurant called The Boardroom in Oldham.

In September 2017, he opened his first major restaurant called WOOD Manchester. Following the success of his Manchester restaurant, he opened WOOD Chester in March 2018. his latest offering is WOODKRAFT Cheltenham which opened in November 2018

His debut cookbook At Home with Simon Wood – Fine Dining Made Simple was published on the 11 April 2016 He was invited to appear as a guest judge on the 2020 series of MasterChef.

From 30 September to 4 October, Simon Wood was at the TV Experience Residency in Dubai for the first time and hosted an exclusive MasterChef masterclass. In order to deliver the master experience to the people in Dubai, the first group decided to open their first MasterChef restaurant in the world.

Preceded by Ping Coombes	MasterChef UK champion 2015	Succeeded by Jane Devonshire
