= Shelina Permalloo =

TV chef and restaurateur

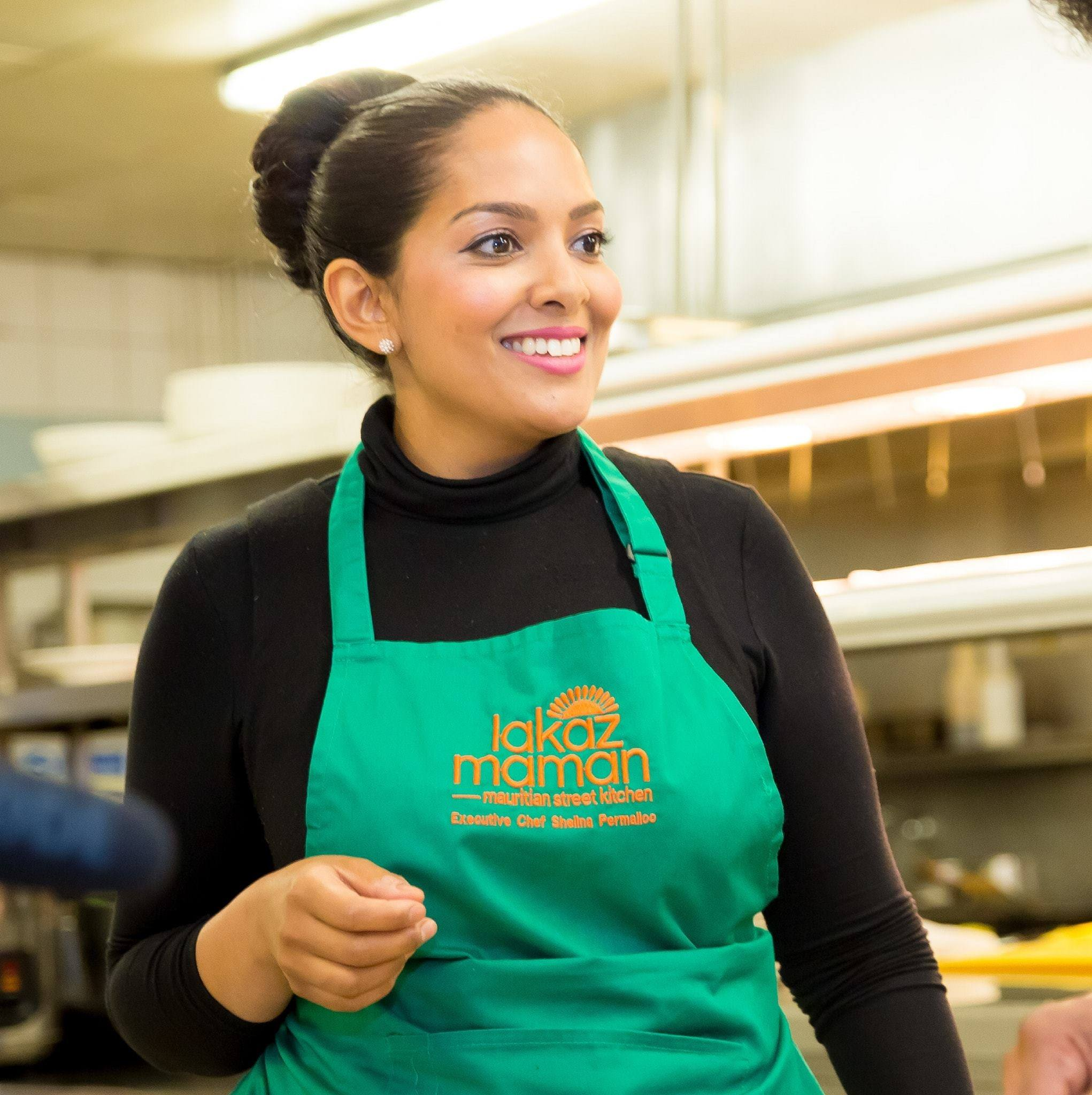
Shelina Permalloo

Shelina Permalloo is a TV chef, restaurateur and cookery author who specialises in Mauritian food. She was the first woman of colour to win BBC's MasterChef in 2012.

== Early life ==
Permalloo was born and brought up in Southampton and identifies as being a British Mauritian with both parents migrating from Mauritius.

== Career ==
After time as a project manager in the field of equality, diversity and inclusion, Permalloo took part in MasterChef programme and she became BBC’s MasterChef Champion in 2012. She published her first cook book Sunshine on a Plate based on her Mauritian heritage. She opened her first restaurant Lakaz Maman in Southampton in 2016. Her restaurant is inspired by modern Mauritian street food and is run by an all-female management team.

Permalloo is a panellist on BBC Radio 4 The Kitchen Cabinet with food critic Jay Rayner. She has returned as a judge on BBC’s MasterChef and as a guest chef on TV in show's such as Saturday Kitchen, Kirstie Allsopp Handmade Christmas and John and Lisa's Weekend Kitchen.

Her first book Sunshine on a Plate reflects her Mauritian Heritage and won the Gourmand book awards for 'best African cookbook', her second book The Sunshine Diet was published in 2015.

She has partnered her restaurant with SOS Children’s Village, an orphanage based in Mauritius. For every full-time staff member, Lakaz Maman sponsors a child in Mauritius.

In 2022 she gave a TEDx talk at the University of Southampton on the power of food.

She was appointed Chair of Southampton 2025 City of Culture Trust. During the pandemic, her team cooked over 1,500 meals for keyworkers and the homeless and 300 free school meals. She is an ambassador for Southampton’s Holiday Activities and Food Programme.

== Publications ==
- Sunshine on a Plate (2013)
- The Sunshine Diet (2015)

Preceded by Tim Anderson	MasterChef UK champion 2012	Succeeded by Natalie Coleman
