= Brin Pirathapan =

British-Sri Lankan chef and veterinary surgeon

- Born: Ilford, England
- Education: King Edward VI Grammar School, Chelmsford
- Occupations: Chef, veterinary surgeon
- Known for: MasterChef 2024 winner

Brin Pirathapan is a British Tamil chef and veterinary surgeon who was the winner of the 2024 series of MasterChef competition which was broadcast on BBC One.

== Biography ==
His father Gopal works as a civil engineer while his mother works at a bank. His parents migrated to UK owing to the impact caused by the deadly Sri Lankan Civil War as his parents believed and considered Sri Lanka as an unsafe place to live. He was born in Ilford and was raised up in Chelmsford, Essex. He then later moved to Bristol to pursue his studies in the field of veterinary science.

== Career ==
He maximized his cooking potential using his exposure to Tamil culinary culture to full effect and thus played an integral pivotal role in his cooking methodologies. He became popular after entering the MasterChef UK program as one of the contestants. Prior to entering the MasterChef show, he was working as a veterinary surgeon in Bristol.

He prepared a dish with sambal-crusted rack of lamb with an aubergine relish during the second round of the 2024 MasterChef UK and he insisted that it was loosely inspired from the traditional kathirikkai (brinjal) curries which in fact is an inevitable popular household dish among Tamil people. He displayed his cooking abilities during the contest with an amalgamation of both British upbringing and Tamil heritage.

In an exclusive interview with the Tamil Guardian, he insisted that he drew inspiration from his own Tamil identity and Tamil background, which helped to create a variety of dishes with an essence of Tamil culture embedded in the flavors. He revealed that he developed a passion for foods through his parents.

He was adjudged as the winner of the MasterChef UK in its 20th series after being one of the three finalists of the season alongside Louise Lyons Macleod and Chris Willoughby. He was crowned as the winner after showcasing dishes made using fried capers, pickled chilli, pickled and charred shallots, orange and honey-glazed octopus with tempura mussels, herb tuilles dusted with scallop roe, an orange gel and samphire on a romesco sauce.
