= Dhruv Baker =

British/Mexican chef

- Born: Mexico
- Occupation: Chef
- Years active: 2010–present
- Spouse: Aileen
- Children: 1

Dhruv Baker is a British cook and was named winner of BBC One's MasterChef competition in 2010.

== Early life ==
Baker was born in Mexico to an English father and Indian mother. After completing secondary school he moved to England to study for a degree in Business and Spanish at Birmingham University. Although he started his career in media sales, he gave up his job to enter MasterChef.

== Career ==
Since winning MasterChef 2010, Dhruv has become co-owner of catering company called Earlsfield Kitchen and the Jolly Gardeners pub in Earlsfield, London.

== Publications ==
- Spice: Layers of Flavour (2014)

Preceded by Mat Follas	MasterChef UK champion 2010	Succeeded by Tim Anderson
