= Natalie Coleman =

British chef

- Born: Natalie Coleman; 20 August 1983 (age 43); Hackney, London, England
- Occupation: Chef
- Years active: 2014–present

Natalie Coleman (born 20 August 1983) is a British chef and winner of the 2013 series of MasterChef. She is now the head chef of The Garrison in Bermondsey street and won Best Pub Chef at the 2022 Great British Pub Awards.

== Early life ==
Coleman grew up in Hackney, east London, and went to Chingford Foundation School, the same school that David Beckham, Harry Kane and Dwight Gayle attended.

Before appearing on series 9 of the BBC cooking show MasterChef she worked as a credit controller and a part-time techno DJ.

== Career ==
Since winning MasterChef, Natalie has worked stages at some of the most well known restaurants in the UK including Le Gavroche (Michel Roux Jr), Viajante (Nuno Mendes), St Johns (Fergus Henderson), The Kitchin (Tom Kitchin), L’enclume (Simon Rogan), The Berkeley Hotel (Marcus Wareing), Midsummer House (Daniel Clifford) and The Hand & Flowers (Tom Kerridge).

In 2014 she published her first cookbook titled Winning Recipes: For Every Day.

In May 2019 she was appointed to oversee the menu of a new restaurant Hello Darling which opened next to the Old Vic Theatre in London.

She has been Head Chef at The Oyster Shed in the City of London since November 2021. In 2022 she won Best Pub Chef at the Great British Pub Awards.

In 2023 she won her first AA Rossette for the Oyster Shed followed by Young's Best Food Pub of the year 2023.

== Publications ==
- Winning Recipes: For Every Day (2014)

Coleman has also co-authored:

- MasterChef the Finalists cookbook with fellow MasterChef runners-up Dale Williams and Larkin Cen, (2014)
- MasterChef Ordinary to Extraordinary (2018)

Preceded by Shelina Permalloo	MasterChef UK champion 2013	Succeeded by Ping Coombes
