= Mat Follas =

British chef

Mat Follas was the winner of the BBC's MasterChef programme in 2009.

Follas won MasterChef by beating Andy Oliver and Chris Gates in the grand final. His final winning dish consisted of a starter of trio of rabbit with nettles and pancetta crisps; a main of spider crab thermidor accompanied with mussels, foraged sea vegetables and a side of chips; and for dessert a creamy lavender and blackberry mousse with honeycomb and blackberry sauce.

Following MasterChef, Follas opened his own restaurant later in 2009, 'The Wild Garlic' in Beaminster, Dorset.

Preceded by James Nathan	MasterChef UK champion 2009	Succeeded by Dhruv Baker
