= MasterChef (British TV series) =

British cooking competition television show (1990–)

- Also known as: MasterChef Goes Large (2005–2007)
- Genre: Reality show
- Created by: Franc Roddam
- Presented by: Loyd Grossman; Gary Rhodes; Giorgio Locatelli
- Judges: John Torode; Gregg Wallace; Anna Haugh; Grace Dent
- Narrated by: India Fisher
- Country of origin: United Kingdom
- Original language: English
- No. of series: MasterChef; 11 (original); 20 (revival); Celebrity MasterChef; 21
- No. of episodes: MasterChef; 146 (original, inc. specials); 512 (revival); Celebrity MasterChef; 334

Production
- Executive producer: Franc Roddam
- Producers: Karen Ross; David Ambler
- Production locations: Original; TVS Television Theatre (1990); Limehouse Studios (1991); Revival; Celebrity; City University's Bastwick Street Halls of Residence (2005–2011); Ram Brewery (2011–2014); 3 Mills Studios (2014–2025); Digbeth Loc Studios (2025–present)
- Running time: 30–90 minutes
- Production companies: Union Pictures (1990–2000); Union 175 (2001); Shine TV and Ziji Productions (2005–present)

Original release
- Network: BBC One
- Release: 2 July 1990 – 4 June 2000
- Network: BBC Two
- Release: 3 April – 3 July 2001
- Release: 21 February 2005 – 28 February 2008
- Network: BBC One (Celebrity)
- Release: 11 September 2006 – 22 October 2011
- Network: BBC One
- Release: 5 January 2009 – present
- Network: BBC Two (Celebrity)
- Release: 13 August – 12 September 2012
- Network: BBC One (Celebrity)
- Release: 31 July 2013 – present

Related
- Junior MasterChef; Celebrity MasterChef; MasterChef: The Professionals; Young MasterChef

MasterChef is a British competitive cooking reality show produced by Endemol Shine UK and Banijay that is broadcast on the BBC. The show initially ran from 1990 to 2001 in its original format and was revived in 2005 as MasterChef Goes Large. The revival featured a new format devised by Franc Roddam and John Silver, with Karen Ross producing. In 2008, the name was changed back to MasterChef, but the new format remained.

The British series has appeared in five versions: the main MasterChef series; Celebrity MasterChef; MasterChef: The Professionals, with working chefs; Junior MasterChef, with children between the ages of nine and twelve; and Young MasterChef for those aged between 18 and 25. It is the originator of the MasterChef franchise that has been adapted and reproduced in 60 countries around the world in various localised versions.

The main series and the Celebrity versions were presented from 2005 until 2025 by John Torode and Gregg Wallace.

In July 2025, the BBC announced it would not renew the two presenters' contracts, following upheld multiple complaints of sexual harassment by Wallace, and a single complaint of use of an offensive racial term by Torode. Grace Dent and Anna Haugh began presenting the main series in 2026. Dent was a frequent guest judge/critic of the show's various formats, while Haugh had previously co-presented one season of The Professionals in place of regular co-presenter Monica Galetti.

== Original series ==
In the original series, amateur cooks competed for the title of Master Chef. The show featured nine rounds leading up to three semifinals and a final. In each round, three contestants were tasked with preparing a gourmet three-course meal in under two hours. The contestants could choose the meal, although there was a price limit on ingredients. "Everyday" ingredients and equipment were provided, and contestants could also bring up to five "speciality" ingredients or utensils.

The first incarnation of the series was commissioned by Dave Ross for the BBC and he gave it the name ‘Masterchef’. It was presented by Loyd Grossman, who was joined each week by a professional chef and a celebrity to act as judges. In each episode, Grossman and the guest judges discussed the menus, talked to the contestants, and finally ate and judged the food. The judges' "cogitations" originally took place off-camera, but later episodes included edited highlights of the discussions after the food had been tasted and before the winner was announced.

In 1998, Grossman decided to take a sabbatical and the series was not made in his absence. He returned to present the 1999 series but left the show in 2000.

=== Grossman's departure and 2001 revamp ===
In 2001, the show underwent a makeover in response to declining ratings. It was moved from its traditional Sunday afternoon slot on BBC One to a Tuesday night slot on BBC Two and the format of the show was modified. The celebrity judge was no longer included and the contestants had to cook two courses in 90 minutes, which was extended to two-and-a-half hours for three courses in the final episode. As an additional requirement, each contestant had to use the same key ingredient in each course.

In October 2000, Grossman left in anger over the proposed changes and was replaced by chef Gary Rhodes, who had previously presented MasterChef USA. Rhodes' advice to contestants was more critical than Grossman's and the show was acclaimed for its more serious tone, which later inspired the MasterChef Goes Large format and other cooking competitions like Hell's Kitchen. However, the new version of the show did not revive ratings as hoped and was cancelled by the BBC after the first series.

== Revived series ==
Previous logo

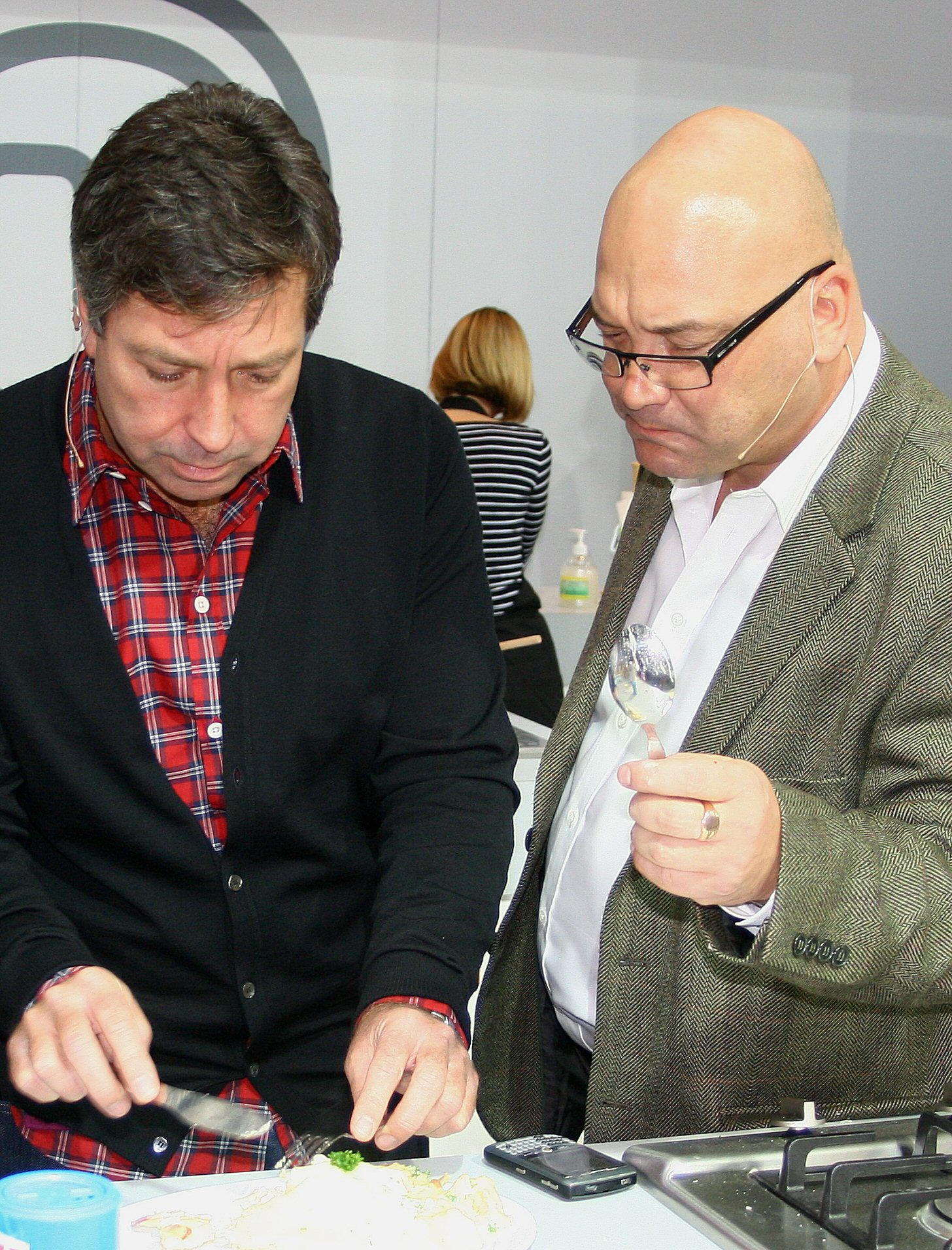
Judges John Torode and Gregg Wallace at MasterChef Live, London, 2009

In 2005, the executive producers Franc Roddam and John Silver, with the series producer Karen Ross, radically overhauled the show's format and introduced a new series. It was initially titled MasterChef Goes Large, but the name reverted to MasterChef in 2008. The new series was originally judged by John Torode and Gregg Wallace, with voice-over narration provided by India Fisher.

The show proved very popular and became one of BBC Two's more successful early evening programmes, leading to an announcement by the BBC in 2009 that it would be promoted to BBC One.

In February 2022, the BBC and Shine TV announced that they had agreed a multi-series six-year deal for the programme, and from 2024 the production base would move from London to Birmingham. In January 2023, it was reported that Birmingham City Council had approved BBC plans to use the old Banana Warehouse in Digbeth as the new MasterChef studios.

=== Wallace and Torode's departure ===
It was revealed in November 2024, that following allegations against judge Gregg Wallace, he had decided to temporarily step away from the show. In December 2024, it was revealed that Wallace had temporarily been replaced with food critic Grace Dent for the following year's celebrity series. In July 2025, the BBC dismissed Wallace as presenter after a further 50 complaints emerged concerning his behaviour. Following Wallace's dismissal from the show, it was revealed on 15 July 2025, that Torode had also been dismissed following extremely "racist remarks".

Later that month, the BBC confirmed it would air the final amateur series with Torode and Wallace, which was filmed in 2024, but could be re-edited in light of recent events; meanwhile, no decision had yet been made on what to do with the completed celebrity series and Christmas special, which were both later filmed with Torode and Dent. It was later revealed that one contestant from the amateur series was to be edited out of the programme after requesting for it to not be aired. Philippa Childs, head of the Broadcasting, Entertainment, Communications and Theatre Union called for the BBC to reconsider its decision.

Anna Haugh presented alongside Torode in the final episodes of the 2025 series, covering for Wallace's initial suspension. On 8 September 2025, it was announced that Haugh and Dent would be the new presenters of MasterChef.

On 3 June 2026, it was announced that Giorgio Locatelli would replace Torode as the judge of Celebrity MasterChef alongside Dent from the twenty-first series.

=== Format ===
Each series is broadcast on five nights a week for eight weeks. During the first six weeks, the first four episodes of each week are heats and the fifth episode is a quarter-final. Six contestants enter each heat and the winner becomes a quarter-finalist. At the end of each week, the four quarter-finalists compete and a semi-finalist is chosen. After six weeks, the six semi-finalists compete in the final two weeks.

In 2010, the judges were given more flexibility, allowing them to advance more than one contestant to the quarter-finals or, in one instance, none at all. Series 7 of MasterChef had auditions with a format similar to The X Factor, in which hopeful chefs cooked in front of the judges to secure a spot in the competition. More than 20,000 people applied to audition for the series.

==== Heats ====
The heats follow a three-round format:

- The Market Test: the contestants must invent a dish using ingredients from the show's market. They have 15 minutes to select ingredients and 1 hour and 10 minutes to cook the meal. Three contestants are eliminated from the competition and those remaining advance to the Impression Test.
- The Calling Card: the contestants must invent a dish from scratch in 75 minutes (originally 40 minutes until 2009). The contestants can choose any ingredients they like.
- The Invention Test: the contestants are given two boxes: one with sweet items and the other with savoury items. They must pick a box and make a dish using its ingredients within 75 minutes.
- The Impression Test: the contestants must cook a two-course meal in 75 minutes for past winners and finalists of MasterChef. They are given one hour to serve the main course and 15 minutes afterwards to serve dessert. This segment was first featured in 2017.

==== Quarter-finals ====
The format of the quarter-finals has changed over the years. Before 2010, the format featured three rounds:

- The Ingredients Test: the contestants were asked to identify a selection of ingredients or produce.
- The Passion Test: the contestants each had one minute to convince the judges of their overwhelming passion for food.
- After eliminating one contestant, the remaining three quarter-finalists each produced a three-course meal in 1 hour and 20 minutes.

In 2010, the quarter-final format was cut to two rounds:

- The Choice Test: the contestants were given 15 minutes to cook their choice of either a pre-selected fish recipe or meat recipe with the judges supervising. At least one contestant was eliminated after this round.
- The remaining quarter-finalists each produced a two-course meal in one hour.

The current quarter-final format consists of two rounds:

- The Palate Test: Judge John Torode cooks a dish for the contestants, and they must identify the ingredients and try to recreate the dish using the ingredients available to them.
- The Choice Test: the contestants have 80 minutes to create a showstopping dish for the judges and a special celebrity food critic.

==== Comeback Week ====
The sixth week is called "Comeback Week" and features contestants from previous series of MasterChef who did not advance past the heats or quarter-finals. The format changes for this special week. It includes:

- The Skill Test: the contestants have 25 minutes to cook one of two pre-selected recipes. Some contestants may be eliminated after this round.
- The Palate Test: Torode cooks a complex dish and asks the contestants one by one to taste the dish and identify its ingredients. Some contestants may be eliminated after this round.
- The Pressure Test: the contestants work a lunchtime shift at a busy restaurant under the supervision of a professional chef who comments on their performance.
- The remaining contestants have one hour to cook a two-course meal. One contestant is selected to advance to the quarter-final.
- The comeback quarter-finalists then cook head-to-head in a larger version of the Invention Test, cooking one dish in an hour. One contestant is selected to advance to the semi-finals.

== MasterChef Live ==
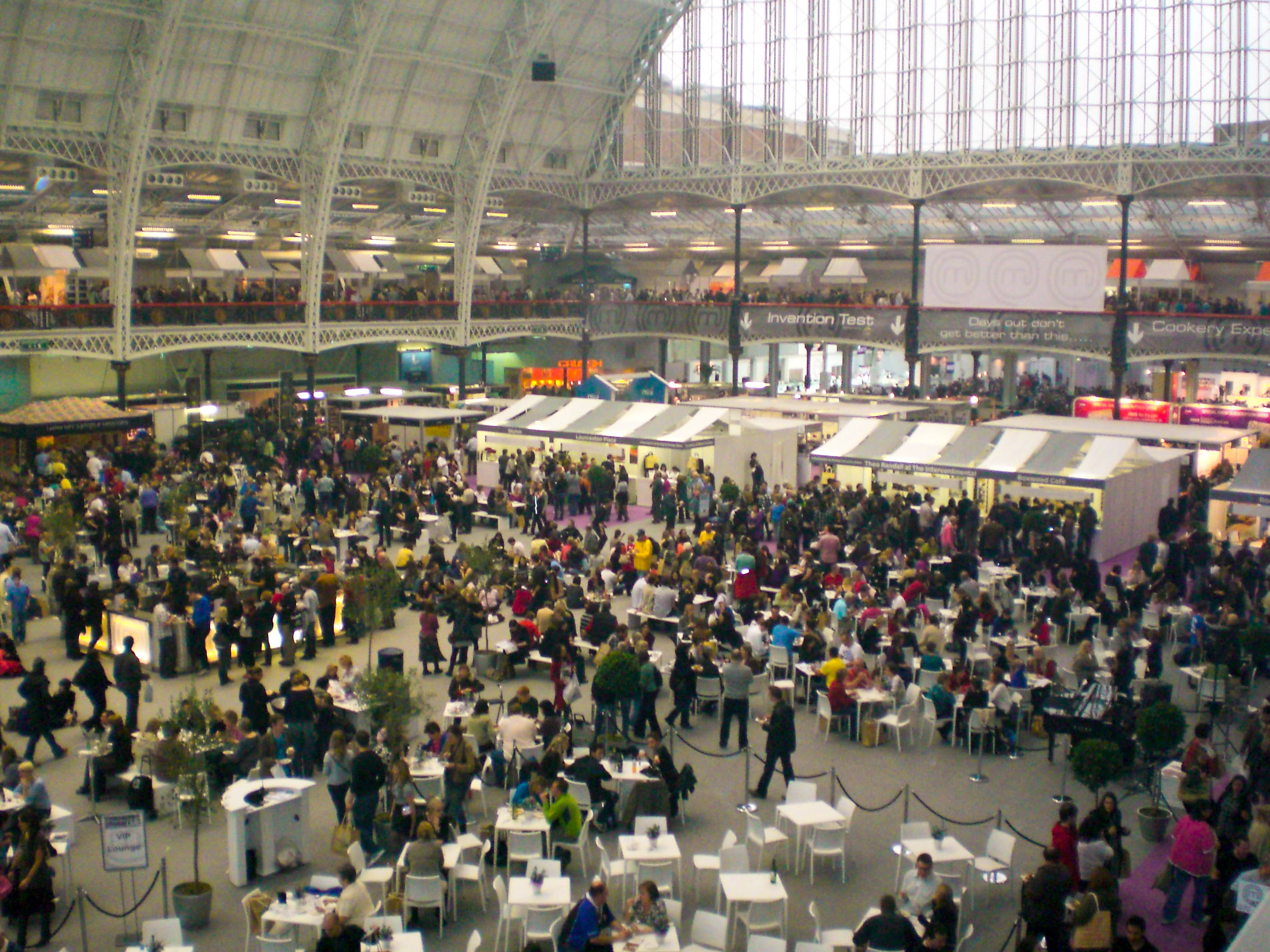
MasterChef Live at Olympia London, 2009

MasterChef Live is an extension of the television programme. It has been held each November since 2009 and the event lasts three days. It is hosted at London Olympia and is co-located with the annual Wine Show. Highlights of the event include live cooking demonstrations in the Chefs' Theatre, celebrity chefs, former contestants, critics and MasterChef-style cook-offs.

== Celebrity MasterChef ==
Celebrity MasterChef was devised as a celebrity version of MasterChef Goes Large. The show was screened on BBC One from 2006 to 2011. Originally, 24 celebrities participated in each series with three contestants per episode following the full MasterChef Goes Large test.

In 2011, the programme was moved to a daily daytime slot with 30 episodes screened over six weeks and with only 16 celebrities. Catch-up shows were broadcast on Fridays at 20:30 (30 minutes) and on Saturdays at various times (60 minutes). In 2012, the show moved to BBC Two due to low ratings and returned to an evening 18:30 slot. In 2013, it moved back to BBC One prime time, shown at 20:00. Since 2014, the show has had 20 celebrities competing for the title.

=== Contestants ===
The winners from each year are in bold texts.

==== Series 1 (2006) ====
Matt Dawson, Arabella Weir, Charlie Dimmock, David Grant, Fred MacAulay, Graeme Le Saux, Hardeep Singh Kohli, Helen Lederer, Ian McCaskill, Jilly Goolden, Kristian Digby, Lady Isabella Hervey, Linda Barker, Marie Helvin, Paul Young, Richard Arnold, Roger Black, Rowland Rivron, Sarah Cawood, Sheila Ferguson, Simon Grant, Sue Perkins, Tony Hadley and Toyah Willcox.

==== Series 2 (2007) ====
Nadia Sawalha, Midge Ure, Craig Revel Horwood, Jeremy Edwards, Chris Bisson, Martin Hancock, Sunetra Sarker, Gemma Atkinson, Sherrie Hewson, Pauline Quirke, Rani Price, Chris Hollins, Matthew Wright, Angela Rippon, Sue Cook, Lorne Spicer, Emma Forbes, Jeff Green, Darren Bennett, Sally Gunnell, Mark Foster, Matt James, Robbie Earle and Phil Tufnell.

==== Series 3 (2008) ====
Liz McClarnon, Linda Robson, Louis Emerick, Debra Stephenson, Christopher Parker, Joe McGann, Steven Pinder, Mark Moraghan, Vicki Michelle, Sean Wilson, Clare Grogan, Hywel Simons, DJ Spoony, Claire Richards, Denise Lewis, Noel Whelan, Andi Peters, Andrew Castle, Michael Buerk, Kaye Adams, Julia Bradbury, Josie D'Arby, Wendi Peters, and Ninia Benjamin.

==== Series 4 (2009) ====
Jayne Middlemiss, Colin Murray, Wendi Peters, Simon Shepherd, Janet Ellis, Deena Payne, Iwan Thomas, Rav Wilding, Pete Waterman, Stephen K. Amos, Gemma Bissix, Shirley Robertson, Ian Bleasdale, Paul Martin, Tracy-Ann Oberman, Brian Moore, Saira Khan, Rosie Boycott, Michael Obiora, Joel Ross, Shobna Gulati, Dennis Taylor, Siân Lloyd, Jan Leeming and Joe Swift.

There was also a week of Comeback contestants featuring Joe McGann, Marie Helvin, Linda Barker, Claire Richards, Rowland Rivron, Ninia Benjamin, Steven Pinder, Wendi Peters, Helen Lederer, Tony Hadley, Martin Hancock and Jeff Green.

==== Series 5 (2010) ====
Lisa Faulkner, Neil Stuke, Richard Farleigh, Nihal Arthanayake, Alex Fletcher, Tessa Sanderson, Jenny Powell, Colin Jackson, Tricia Penrose, Martin Roberts, Christine Hamilton, Chris Walker, Dick Strawbridge, Danielle Lloyd, Marcus Patric, Dean Macey, Mark Chapman, Jennie Bond, Mark Little and Kym Mazelle.

==== Series 6 (2011) ====
Phil Vickery, Kirsty Wark, Nick Pickard, Darren Campbell, Linda Lusardi, Michelle Mone, Ruth Goodman, Aggie MacKenzie, Ricky Groves, Margi Clarke, Colin McAllister, Justin Ryan, Shobu Kapoor, Sharon Maughan, Tim Lovejoy and Danny Goffey.

==== Series 7 (2012) ====
Emma Kennedy, Danny Mills, Michael Underwood, Zoe Salmon, Gareth Gates, Cheryl Baker, Laila Rouass, George Layton, Diarmuid Gavin, Richard McCourt, Rebecca Romero, Jamie Theakston, Jenny Eclair, Javine Hylton, Steve Parry and Anne Charleston.

==== Series 8 (2013) ====
Ade Edmondson, John Thomson, Heidi Range, Shane Lynch, Miranda Krestovnikoff, Denise Black, Phillips Idowu, Speech Debelle, Brian Capron, Les Dennis, Matthew Hoggard, Katy Brand, Shappi Khorsandi, Joe Calzaghe, Jo Wood and Janet Street-Porter.

==== Series 9 (2014) ====
Sophie Thompson, Christopher Biggins, Todd Carty, Tina Hobley, Kiki Dee, JB Gill, Wayne Sleep, Alison Hammond, Tania Bryer, Amanda Burton, Jason Connery, Ken Morley, Millie Mackintosh, Emma Barton, Russell Grant, Alex Ferns, Leslie Ash, Jodie Kidd, Charley Boorman and Susannah Constantine.

==== Series 10 (2015) ====
Kimberly Wyatt, Keith Chegwin, Sarah Harding, Yvette Fielding, Arlene Phillips, Samira Ahmed, Andy Akinwolere, Syd Little, Amanda Donohoe, Craig Gazey, Tom Parker, Patricia Potter, Chesney Hawkes, Danny Crates, Mica Paris, Sheree Murphy, Natalie Lowe, Scott Maslen, Rylan Clark and Sam Nixon.

==== Series 11 (2016) ====
Alexis Conran, Donna Air, Neil Back, Amelle Berrabah, Marcus Butler, Tommy Cannon, Amy Childs, Richard Coles, David Harper, Audley Harrison, Cherry Healey, Liz Johnson, Tina Malone, Louise Minchin, Laila Morse, Jimmy Osmond, Sid Owen, Gleb Savchenko, Sinitta and Simon Webbe.

==== Series 12 (2017) ====
Angellica Bell, Rebecca Adlington, Abdullah Afzal, Kate Bottley, Patti Boulaye, Brian Bovell, Tyger Drew-Honey, Lesley Garrett, Dev Griffin, Barney Harwood, Stephen Hendry, Jaymi Hensley, Ulrika Jonsson, Henri Leconte, Debbie McGee, Aasmah Mir, Jim Moir, Nick Moran, Julia Somerville and Rachel Stevens.

==== Series 13 (2018) ====
John Partridge, Michelle Ackerley, Chizzy Akudolu, Keith Allen, Clara Amfo, Martin Bayfield, Jay Blades, Frankie Bridge, Gemma Collins, Josh Cuthbert, Carol Decker, Anita Harris, Jean Johansson, Zoe Lyons, Spencer Matthews, Lisa Maxwell, Monty Panesar, Stella Parton, AJ Pritchard and Stef Reid.

==== Series 14 (2019) ====
Greg Rutherford, Élizabeth Bourgine, Joey Essex, Alex George, Andy Grant, Rickie Haywood-Williams, Judge Jules, Josie Long, Oti Mabuse, Kellie Maloney, Dominic Parker, Vicky Pattison, Martha Reeves, Zandra Rhodes, Neil Ruddock, Jenny Ryan, Tomasz Schafernaker, Mim Shaikh, Dillian Whyte and Adam Woodyatt.

==== Series 15 (2020) ====
Riyadh Khalaf, Shyko Amos, John Barnes, Jeff Brazier, Baga Chipz, Phil Daniels, Karen Gibson, Gethin Jones (withdrew due to illness), Amar Latif, Lady Leshurr, Dominic Littlewood, Judi Love, Felicity Montagu, Judy Murray, Matthew Pinsent, Sam Quek, Crissy Rock, Thomas Skinner, Myles Stephenson and Pete Wicks.

==== Series 16 (2021) ====
Kadeena Cox, Nabil Abdulrashid, Bez, Kem Cetinay, Munya Chawawa, Michelle Collins, Dion Dublin, Gavin Esler, Patrick Grant, Duncan James, Melissa Johns, Will Kirk, Penny Lancaster, Megan McKenna, Su Pollard, Katie Price, Johannes Radebe, Rita Simons, Joe Swash and Melanie Sykes.

==== Series 17 (2022) ====
Lisa Snowdon, Richard Blackwood, Melanie Blatt, Jimmy Bullard, Paul Chuckle, Nancy Dell'Olio, Chris Eubank, Kirsty Gallacher, Danny Jones, Katya Jones, Lesley Joseph, Kae Kurd, Gareth Malone, Queen MoJo, Cliff Parisi, Adam Pearson, Clarke Peters, Kitty Scott-Claus, Ryan Thomas and Faye Winter.

==== Series 18 (2023) ====
Wynne Evans, Richie Anderson, apl.de.ap, Dave Benson Phillips, Luca Bish, Marcus Brigstocke, James Buckley, Remi Burgz, Dianne Buswell, Terry Christian, Dani Dyer, Sam Fox, Max George, Cheryl Hole, Jamelia, Leon "Locksmith" Rolle, Shazia Mirza, Michael Praed, Mica Ven and Amy Walsh.

==== Series 19 (2024) ====
Vito Coppola, Harry Aikines-Aryeetey, Eshaan Akbar, OJ Borg, Edith Bowman, Mutya Buena, Chloe Burrows, Diane Carson, Charlotte Crosby, Craig Doyle, Danielle Harold, Tamer Hassan, Jamie MacDonald, Christine McGuinness, Jake Quickenden, Rochenda Sandall, Snoochie Shy, Dominic Skinner, Emma Thynn, Marchioness of Bath and Ian "H" Watkins.

==== Series 20 (2025) ====
Ginger Johnson, Alfie Boe, Ashley Cain, Gaz Choudhry, Antony Costa, Jaki Graham, Michelle Heaton, Chris Hughes, Uma Jammeh, Noreen Khan, Jamie Lomas, Katie McGlynn, Jodie Ounsley, Dawn O'Porter and Alun Wyn Jones.

==== Series 21 (2026) ====
Lauren Steadman, Emily Campbell, Sue Cleaver, Max Fosh, Nitin Ganatra, Una Healy, Shakira Khan, Jay McGuiness, Jason Mohammad, Melvin Odoom, Joe Pasquale, Donna Preston, Thomas “TommyInnit” Simons, Emily Steel and Eric Underwood.

== Other versions and spin-offs ==
=== MasterChef: The Professionals ===
MasterChef: The Professionals, a version for professional chefs, was introduced in 2008.

=== Junior MasterChef ===
Junior MasterChef originally ran from 1994 to 1999 for contestants under 16 years old. It was revived in 2010 with contestants between nine and twelve years old. A second series of the revived format ran in 2012 and a third series followed in 2014.

=== Young MasterChef ===
In February 2022, BBC Three commissioned Young MasterChef, which premiered its first series in 2023. The judges for the first series were Poppy O'Toole and Kerth Gumbs. While O'Toole continued as a judge for the second season, Kerth Gumbs was replaced by Big Has. The second series aired in 2024.

== Controversies ==
During the 13th episode of series 14, judges Gregg Wallace and John Torode criticised a rendang dish made by the Malaysian-born contestant Zaleha Kadir Olpin. Zaleha had been given a task to make a chicken dish in thirty minutes and chose to attempt rendang, which takes several hours to prepare. Torode deemed the dish inedible because the chicken skin was rubbery and undercooked and Wallace advised her that with a thirty-minute task she should have made a crispy fried chicken with a sauce. Malaysian and Indonesian commentators pointed out that rendang is usually cooked as a stew and is not intended to be crispy, and that both judges had failed to differentiate between "crispy" and "under-cooked".

Najib Razak, the Malaysian Prime Minister at the time, joined the conversation with a subtle tweet denouncing the judges' opinion. The former Malaysian prime minister Mahathir Mohamad also joined in, suggesting that the judges were confusing rendang with KFC.

In December 2024, following allegations against Wallace, the BBC announced that they had pulled two Christmas specials that were due to air.

== Winners ==
=== MasterChef (original series) ===
The winners were:

1990: Joan Bunting
1991: Sue Lawrence
1992: Vanessa Binns
1993: Derek Johns
1994: Gerry Goldwyre
1995: Marion MacFarlane
1996: Neil Haidar
1997: Julie Friend
1999: Lloyd Burgess
2000: Marjorie Lang
2001: Rosa Baden-Powell

=== MasterChef (revamped series) ===
The winners were:

2005: Thomasina Miers
2006: Peter Bayless
2007: Steven Wallis
2008: James Nathan
2009: Mat Follas
2010: Dhruv Baker
2011: Tim Anderson
2012: Shelina Permalloo
2013: Natalie Coleman
2014: Ping Coombes
2015: Simon Wood
2016: Jane Devonshire
2017: Saliha Mahmood-Ahmed
2018: Kenny Tutt
2019: Irini Tzortzoglou
2020: Thomas Frake
2021: Tom Rhodes
2022: Eddie Scott
2023: Chariya Khattiyot
2024: Brin Pirathapan
2025: Harry Maguire
2026: Jhané Gibson

=== Celebrity MasterChef ===
The winners were:

2006: Matt Dawson
2007: Nadia Sawalha
2008: Liz McClarnon
2009: Jayne Middlemiss
2010: Lisa Faulkner
2011: Phil Vickery
2012: Emma Kennedy
2013: Adrian Edmondson
2014: Sophie Thompson
2015: Kimberly Wyatt
2016: Alexis Conran
2017: Angellica Bell
2018: John Partridge
2019: Greg Rutherford
2020: Riyadh Khalaf
2021: Kadeena Cox
2022: Lisa Snowdon
2023: Wynne Evans
2024: Vito Coppola
2025: Ginger Johnson
2026: Lauren Steadman

== Transmission guide ==
=== Original series ===
Series	Start date	End date	Episodes	Hosts
1	2 July 1990	24 September 1990	13	Loyd Grossman
2	21 April 1991	14 July 1991	13	Loyd Grossman
3	26 April 1992	19 July 1992	13	Loyd Grossman
4	11 April 1993	4 July 1993	13	Loyd Grossman
5	10 April 1994	3 July 1994	13	Loyd Grossman
6	16 April 1995	9 July 1995	13	Loyd Grossman
7	7 April 1996	30 June 1996	13	Loyd Grossman
8	27 April 1997	3 August 1997	13	Loyd Grossman
9	3 January 1999	28 March 1999	13	Loyd Grossman
10	12 March 2000	4 June 2000	13	Loyd Grossman
11	3 April 2001	3 July 2001	13	Gary Rhodes

==== Specials ====
- Happy 10th Birthday MasterChef: TX 18 June 2000
- Tales from the MasterChef Kitchen: Series 1, 10 editions from 2 July 2000 – 3 September 2000
- Celebrity Special: TX 27 August 2000

=== Revived series ===
Series	Start date	End date	Episodes
1	21 February 2005	1 April 2005	30
2	23 January 2006	17 March 2006	40
3	22 January 2007	15 March 2007	40
4	7 January 2008	28 February 2008	30
5	5 January 2009	26 February 2009	32
6	18 February 2010	7 April 2010	29
7	16 February 2011	27 April 2011	15
8	17 January 2012	15 March 2012	15
9	12 March 2013	2 May 2013	23
10	26 March 2014	16 May 2014	24
11	10 March 2015	24 April 2015	24
12	23 March 2016	6 May 2016	25
13	29 March 2017	12 May 2017	25
14	26 February 2018	13 April 2018	25
15	11 February 2019	29 March 2019	24
16	24 February 2020	17 April 2020	24
17	1 March 2021	14 April 2021^{[1]}	18
18	23 March 2022	5 May 2022	21
19	10 April 2023	1 June 2023	24
20	1 April 2024	23 May 2024	24
21	6 August 2025	26 September 2025	24
22	21 April 2026	5 June 2026	21

Specials

- What The Winners Did Next – featured winners from series 1 and 2 of MasterChef Goes Large, broadcast on 22 January 2007

Notes
1. The final was postponed from its 9 April 2021 air date due to the death of Prince Philip, Duke of Edinburgh.

==== Celebrity MasterChef ====
Series	Start date	End date	Episodes
1	11 September 2006	29 September 2006	15
2	28 May 2007	15 June 2007	15
3	2 July 2008	25 July 2008	12
4	10 June 2009	10 July 2009	15
5	21 July 2010	20 August 2010	15
6	12 September 2011	22 October 2011	30 (daily); 13 (highlights)
7	13 August 2012	21 September 2012	30
8	31 July 2013	6 September 2013	18
9	10 June 2014	18 July 2014	18
10	18 June 2015	24 July 2015	12
11	22 June 2016	29 July 2016	12
12	16 August 2017	22 September 2017	12
13	23 August 2018	28 September 2018	12
14	2 September 2019	11 October 2019	18
15	1 July 2020	30 July 2020	15
16	9 August 2021	17 September 2021	18
17	10 August 2022	22 September 2022	18
18	2 August 2023	8 September 2023	18
19	13 August 2024	20 September 2024	18
20	17 November 2025	19 December 2025	15
21	18 August 2026	18 September 2026	15

===== Specials =====
====== A Recipe for Success ======
A six-part series looking back over 15 years of Celebrity MasterChef, first episode broadcast on 6 August 2020.

====== Christmas Cook-Off ======
Christmas special episodes, where past contestants competed to hold the title of Christmas champion; first episode broadcast on 21 December 2020, second episode broadcast on 23 December 2020.

The winner from each episode is in bold text.

- 21 December 2020: **Janet Street-Porter**, Christopher Biggins, Dev Griffin and Vicky Pattison
- 23 December 2020: **Craig Revel Horwood**, Amar Latif, Crissy Rock and Spencer Matthews
- 21 December 2021: Joey Essex, **Judi Love**, Neil Ruddock, Oti Mabuse and Su Pollard
- 23 December 2021: Gemma Collins, Joe Swash, Les Dennis, Mica Paris and **Rev. Richard Coles**
- 23 December 2022: Bez, Josh Cuthbert, Lesley Garrett and **Iwan Thomas**
- 30 December 2022: AJ Pritchard, Chizzy Akudolu, Kitty Scott-Claus and **Megan McKenna**
- 20 December 2023: **Duncan James**, Faye Winter, Mel Blatt and Richard Blackwood
- 28 December 2023: Grace Dent, **Jay Rayner**, Jimi Famurewa, Leyla Kazim and William Sitwell
- 22 December 2025: GK Barry, Kola Bokinni, Nikki Fox and **Iain Stirling**

====== Champion Of Champions ======
Champion Of Champions special episodes, where past champions competed to hold the title of Champion Of Champions; the first episode was broadcast on 31 December 2021.

The winner from each episode is in bold text.

- 31 December 2021: Tim Anderson, **Ping Coombes**, Saliha Mahmood-Ahmed, Kenny Tutt, and Irini Tzortzoglou.
- 29 December 2025: Natalie Coleman, **Thomas Frake**, Chariya Khattiyot and Brin Pirathapan

== Books ==
- Masterchef: 1990. London: Ebury Press. 13 December 1990. ISBN 978-0563361077.
- Masterchef: 1991. London: Ebury Press. 15 July 1991. ISBN 978-0091752156.
- Masterchef: 1992. London: Vermilion. 20 July 1992. ISBN 978-0091773762.
- Masterchef: 1993. London: Vermilion. 12 July 1993. ISBN 978-0091777654.
- The Best of Masterchef Since 1990. London: Ebury Press. 21 October 1993. ISBN 978-0091777838.
- Masterchef: 1994. London: Vermilion. 4 July 1994. ISBN 978-0091786861.
- Junior Masterchef 1994. London: Vermilion. 14 November 1994. ISBN 978-0091786915.
- Masterchef: 1995. London: Vermilion. 10 July 1995. ISBN 978-0091806835.
- Junior Masterchef 1995. London: Vermilion. 23 October 1995. ISBN 978-0091806682.
- Masterchef: 1996. London: Ebury Press. 25 April 1996. ISBN 978-0091814625.
- The Best of Masterchef. London: Ebury Press. 2 January 1997. ISBN 978-0091853068.
- Masterchef: 1997. London: Ebury Press. 3 April 1997. ISBN 978-0091853051.
- Junior Masterchef 1998. London: Ebury Press. 5 March 1998. ISBN 978-0091853228.
- Masterchef: Best of British Cooking. London: Ebury Press. 7 January 1999. ISBN 978-0091868444.
- MasterChef Kitchen Bible. London: DK. 1 January 2011. ISBN 978-1405373883.

== See also ==
- MasterChef: The Professionals
- Junior MasterChef
