= Monica Galetti =

Samoan-born New Zealand chef (born 1975)

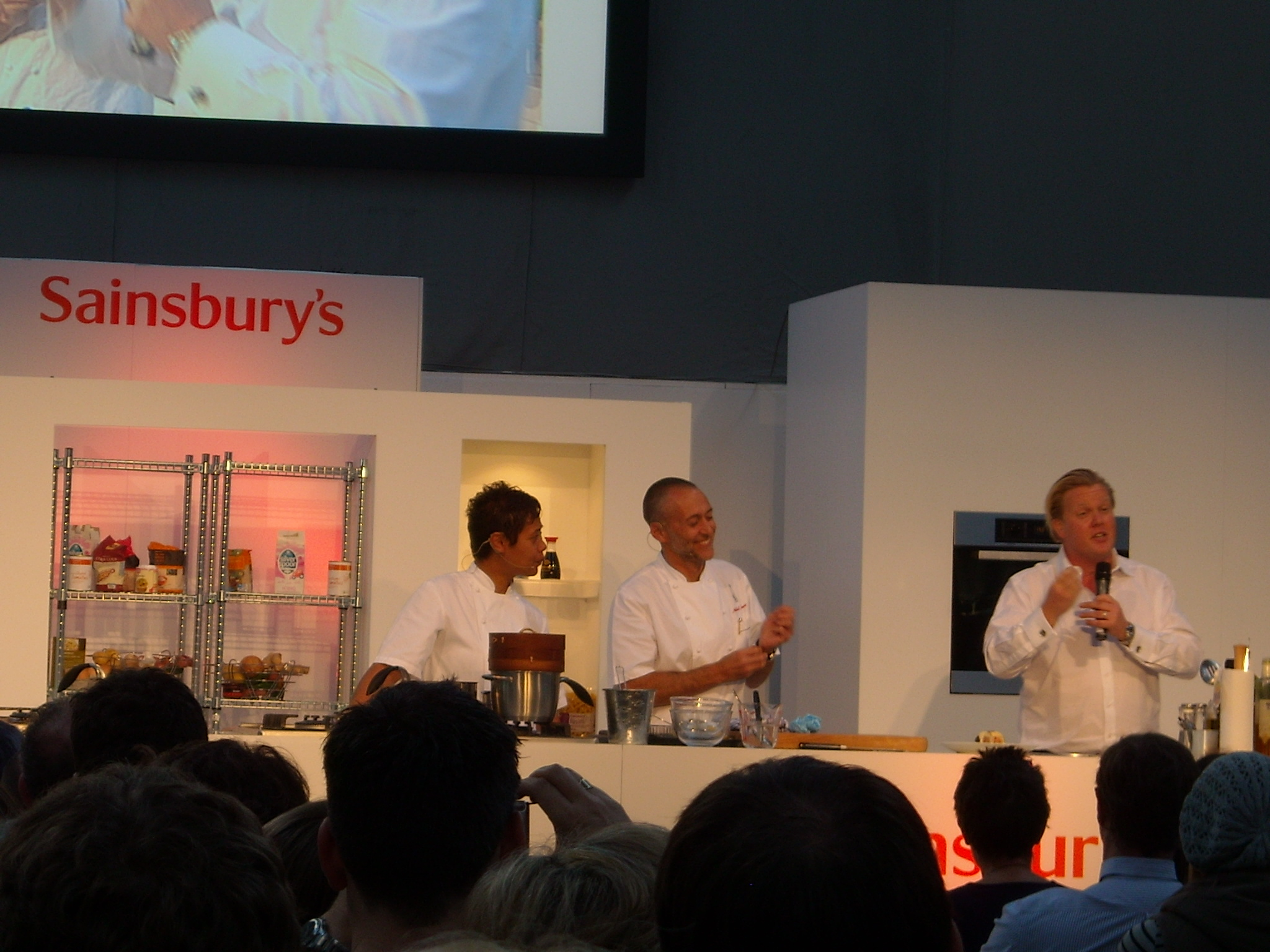
- Galetti (left) assisting Michel Roux Jr. while Olly Smith narrates MasterChef Live 2009
- Born: Monica Faʻafiti; 26 August 1975 (age 51); Pago Pago, American Samoa
- Spouse: David Galetti (m. 2004)
- Children: 1

Monica Galetti (née Faʻafiti, born 26 August 1975) is a Samoan-born New Zealand chef. She is a judge on the BBC competitive cooking programme MasterChef: The Professionals and was the chef proprietor of Mere in London before its closure. She was senior sous-chef at Le Gavroche in London. In addition to her role on MasterChef: The Professionals, she has also presented Amazing Hotels: Life Beyond the Lobby with Giles Coren and Rob Rinder since 2017.

== Early life ==
Galetti was born in Samoa and was initially raised by two aunts in Upolu as her mother had moved to Auckland, New Zealand, for work. At the age of eight, Galetti moved from Samoa to Wellington, New Zealand, and lived there with her parents and five siblings. She attended Naenae College In the early 1990s, she studied for a diploma in hospitality at the Central Institute of Technology, Upper Hutt.

== Career ==
After completing her studies, Galetti worked at a Lower Hutt restaurant, Timothy's. The owner sent her to cooking competitions in Australia, America and Europe, and she began to look for a position in London by sending her CV to top restaurateurs. The first offer she received was from Michel Roux Jr – a beginning position as first commis at his two-Michelin-starred restaurant Le Gavroche, well below her position in Wellington as chef de partie. She accepted the offer and moved to London in 1999. She worked rapidly through the sections of the kitchen and became a senior sous-chef, a position she held until 2015. She was the first woman to hold such a senior position at the restaurant.

While working for Roux, she launched and was Head Chef of the restaurant Le Gavroche des Tropiques in Mauritius.

She was a judge on the BBC series MasterChef: The Professionals from 2009 to 2021, before she was replaced by Anna Haugh, citing she felt it necessary to prioritise her family and her restaurant team, and has appeared as a presenter on other food-related television programmes. Though, in March 2023, Galetti announced she would be returning as a judge on the show.

In 2017, she and her husband, David, opened a new restaurant in London called Mere. This was achieved with backing from Westbury Street Holdings chairman Alastair Storey. Mere closed in 2024.

Galetti serves as a UK Tourism Ambassador for Samoa. She appeared in the BBC’s radio programme Desert Island Discs on 31 January 2021.

=== Publications ===
- Galetti, Monica (2012). Monica's Kitchen. London: Quadrille Publishing. ISBN 978-1849491037.
- Galetti, Monica (2016). The Skills: How to become an expert chef in your own kitchen: 120 recipes, tips and techniques. London: Quadrille Publishing. ISBN 978-1849497640.
- Galetti, Monica (2021). At Home: my favourite recipes for family & friends. London: Aster. ISBN 978-1783254873.

== Platinum Pudding Competition ==
In January 2022 it was announced that Galetti would sit as a judge on The Platinum Pudding Competition, a nationwide baking competition launched on 10 January 2022 by Buckingham Palace, Fortnum & Mason and The Big Jubilee Lunch to find a new pudding dedicated to Queen Elizabeth II as part of the official Platinum Jubilee celebrations marking the 70th anniversary of the accession of Queen Elizabeth II.

== Personal life ==
In 2004, Galetti married French-born sommelier David Galetti, the Head Sommelier at Le Gavroche. They have one daughter, born in 2006.
