= Tim Anderson (chef) =

American chef

- Born: Madison, Wisconsin, U.S.
- Occupation: Chef
- Years active: 2011–present

Tim Anderson is an American-British cook and writer who was named the winner of 2011's MasterChef competition broadcast on BBC One.

== Life and career ==
Anderson was born in Madison, Wisconsin and raised in Racine, Wisconsin. He moved to Los Angeles in 2002, where he studied Japanese food history at Occidental College. After graduating in 2006, he moved to Kitakyushu, Japan, to further his interest in Japanese cuisine. He moved to London with his British wife in 2008 and started his career as a craft beer bar manager. He opened his first restaurant, Nanban Brixton in 2015. His second restaurant, Nanban Central, opened in 2019. He left both businesses in 2021. He has published several books on Japanese cuisine and is a regular contributor to BBC Radio 4's culinary panel show, The Kitchen Cabinet.

== Publications ==
- Nanban: Japanese Soul Food (2015)
- Japaneasy: Classic and Modern Japanese Recipes to Cook at Home (2017)
- Tokyo Stories: A Japanese Cookbook (2019)
- Vegan Japaneasy: Classic and Modern Vegan Japanese Recipes to Cook at Home (2020)
- Your Home Izakaya: Fun and Simple Recipes Inspired by the Drinking-and-Dining Dens of Japan (2021)
- JapanEasy Bowls & Bento: Simple and Satisfying Japanese Recipes for All Day, Every Day (2022)
- Ramen Forever: Recipes for Ramen Success (2023)
- Microwave Meals: Delicious Recipes to Save Time, Effort and Energy (2024)
- Hokkaido: Recipes from the Seas, Fields and Farmlands of Northern Japan (2024)

Preceded by Dhruv Baker	MasterChef UK champion 2011	Succeeded by Shelina Permalloo
