= Saliha Raiss =

Belgian politician

Saliha Raïss

Alderman (acting mayor)

Personal details
- Born: 1989/1990
- Party: Vooruit
- Occupation: Politician

Saliha Raïss (born 1989/1990) is a Belgian politician affiliated with the Vooruit party who serves as an alderwoman in the municipality of Molenbeek, Brussels, and has served as acting mayor.

Her appointment to the municipal college in 2023 drew controversy after opposition from some local liberal politicians over her wearing of a headscarf, and she has since been a visible actor in local debates about community relations and security.

In September 2025, she attracted renewed attention for telling critics in a municipal council exchange that "if Molenbeek is unlivable for you, go elsewhere," remarks widely reported by Belgian and international media.
