= Growing Up Gay =

- Directed by: Aoife Kelleher
- Country of origin: Ireland
- Original language: English
- No. of episodes: 2

Production
- Executive producer: John Murray
- Producer: Anna Rodgers
- Production location: Around Ireland
- Editor: Colm O'Brien
- Production company: Crossing the Line Films

Original release
- Network: RTÉ One
- Release: 19 April 2010

Growing Up Gay is a two-part documentary series broadcast on RTÉ One, which began on Monday 19 April 2010 at 9.35pm (after the main evening news). It explored the experiences of the first generation of lesbian, gay, bisexual and transgender (LGBT) people growing up in an Ireland where it was legal to be themselves. Filmed over 18 months, it was made by Crossing the Line Films with the ongoing support and advice of Ireland's national organisation for Lesbian, Gay, Bisexual and Trans young people, BeLonG To. It featured LGBT school-goers, Muslims, and young people facing persecution in their hometowns across Ireland.

RTÉ courted controversy by recommending that the documentary be suitable for viewing by "mature audiences" only, despite its stars all being teenagers. There was also a delay in the appearance of the second episode on RTÉ player.

Growing Up Gay was nominated for "Event of the Year" at the GALAs (Gay and Lesbian Awards).
