= Ius Laboris =

International network of HR-focused law firms

- Formation: 2001
- Headquarters: Brussels, Belgium
- Region served: Worldwide
- Services: Employment law, labour law, immigration law, pensions law, Pay and Benefits, health & Safety, Internal investigations and whistleblowing, restructuring and labour relations, diversity and inclusion, data privacy, Pay Transparency Directive compliance
- Members: Independent law firms
- Website: Ius Laboris

Ius Laboris is a global alliance of law firms that specialise in employment, labour, immigration and pensions law. The network has over 1,500 HR lawyers based in 56 countries across Europe, the Americas, Middle East and Asia. Ius Laboris member firms advise HR professionals and legal counsel internationally on their HR legal requirements.

== History ==
Ius Laboris was established in 2001 by a group of labour and employment lawyers from Belgium, France, Spain, Luxembourg and Italy. In 2021, the alliance covers 59 countries across the Americas, Europe, the Middle East and Asia. The current Chairman is Pascal Lagoutte and the Executive Director is Sam Everatt.

== Specialisation ==
Members of the network offer legal advice in their respective countries and on the following areas:

- Employment Rights
- Restructuring and Labour Relations
- Immigration and Global Mobility
- Pay and Benefits
- Data Privacy
- Discrimination
- Health and Safety
- Pensions
- Pay Transparency

== Products and services ==
Delphius

Delphius is an AI-powered global employment law intelligence platform developed by Ius Laboris, launched in 2025. The platform is designed for in-house HR, legal and compliance teams managing multi-country workforces, providing instant answers to employment law queries across more than 50 jurisdictions. Content is curated and regularly updated by employment law experts from Ius Laboris member firms.

PayGapIQ

PayGapIQ (also referred to as GAP IQ) is an integrated compliance service launched by Ius Laboris to assist employers in meeting their obligations under the EU Pay Transparency Directive. PayGapIQ combines automated data processing with employment law expertise to assist organisations in analysing pay gaps, preparing compliance-ready reports for submission to relevant authorities, developing legally sound justifications for pay disparities where applicable, and implementing strategic interventions to reduce regulatory and legal risk.

== Members ==
Argentina	Funes De Rioja & Asociados
Australia	Kingston Reid
Austria	Burgstaller Preyer
Bahrain	Al Tamimi & Co.
Belarus	COBALT
Belgium	Claeys & Engels
Brazil	Veirano Advogados
Bulgaria	Boyanov & Co.
Canada	Mathews Dinsdale
Chile	Munita & Olavarría
China	Fangda Partners
Colombia	Brigard Urrutia
Croatia	Divjak Topić Bahtijarević & Krka
Cyprus	George Z. Georgiou & Associates LLC
Czech Republic	Randl Partners
Estonia	COBALT
Finland	Dittmar & Indrenius
France	Capstan Avocats
Germany	Kliemt.HR Lawyers
Greece	Kremalis Law Firm
Hong Kong	Lewis Silkin
Hungary	CLV Partners
India	Kochhar & Co.
Ireland	Lewis Silkin
Israel	Herzog Fox & Neeman
Italy	Toffoletto De Luca Tamajo e Soci
Japan	Anderson Mori & Tomotsune
Kazakhstan	AEQUITAS Law Firm
Latvia	COBALT
Lithuania	COBALT
Luxembourg	CASTEGNARO
Malta	Ganado Advocates
Mexico	Basham, Ringe y Correa S.C.
New Zealand	Kiely Thompson Caisley
Norway	Hjort
Peru	Estudio Olaechea
Poland	Raczkowski
Portugal	pbbr
Romania	Nestor Nestor Diculescu Kingston Petersen
Saudi Arabia	Al Tamimi & Co.
Serbia	Karanovic & Partners
Singapore	Rajah & Tann
Slovakia	Nitschneider and Partners
Slovenia	Selih & Partners
South Korea	Yulchon
Spain	Sagardoy Abogados
Sweden	Elmzell
Switzerland	Schneider & Troillet, Blesi & Papa
Thailand	Rajah & Tann
The Netherlands	Bronsgeest Deur Advocaten, Blom Veugelers Zuiderman
Turkey	Bener Law Office
UAE	Al Tamimi & Co.
UK	Lewis Silkin, Sackers
Ukraine	Vasil Kisil & Partners
USA	Epstein Becker Green

== Rankings and awards ==
- Band 1 - Employment: The Elite in Global-wide - Chambers and Partners (2025)
- Global Network of the Year - The Lawyer European Awards (2023)
- Highly commended - Global Network of the Year - The Lawyer European Awards (2024,2025)
