= India Fisher =

British actress, narrator and presenter

- Fisher in 2004
- Born: 10 September 1974 (age 52); Stoke-on-Trent, England
- Occupations: Television presenter, actress, narrator
- Employer: BBC
- Known for: Doctor Who (Big Finish) Voice Actress

India Fisher (born 10 September 1974) is a British actress, narrator and presenter. Her father is the ex-MP Mark Fisher. She is also the half-sister of musician Crispin Hunt and of actress Francesca Hunt, who appears with her in the play Other Lives.

She has appeared in several episodes of the BBC Radio 4 comedy series Elephants to Catch Eels. She provided the voice for the character of Sophia Winchell in the BBC.co.uk flash-animated webcast series Ghosts of Albion. Between 2001 and 2009, she voiced the character Charley Pollard for Doctor Who, which was part of the Big Finish audio range. She has been in various stories alongside both the Sixth Doctor and the Eighth Doctor. She came back in 2013, in The Light at the End, a two-part 50th Anniversary audio story released on CD in the same year.

On TV, she has appeared in the television series Dead Ringers, and narrates BBC One's cookery programme MasterChef. She also performs voiceovers for television advertisements.

== Science fiction voice work ==
Fisher has provided voices on a number of Science Fiction audio dramas:

- In a series of audio plays based on the BBC science fiction television series Doctor Who as the companion Charley Pollard.
- In the Big Finish Productions audio drama Earthsearch Mindwarp, based on a James Follett novel, broadcast on the digital radio station BBC 7. Fellow companion actor Ingrid Oliver is also the daughter of an MP for Stoke-on-Trent Central.
- In Sci Fi Channel UK's online audio version of Blake's 7 by "B7 Productions" (a.k.a. "Blake's 7 Enterprises" and "B7 Media") – playing Lora Mezin, a federation officer forcibly conscripted to the rebel cause by Blake.

== Other voice work ==
- MasterChef narrator.
- Junior MasterChef narrator
- The Girl on the Train (novel) audiobook narrator (2016 Audie Award for Audiobook of the Year)
- NatWest telephone banking
- Make or Break? narrator
- PG Tips
- The Dumping Ground Leera in the 11th episode of the seventh series.
- Body Bizarre: Girl with a Split Face narrator
- Mathswatch video narrator
