= Lewis Silkin LLP =

British law firm

- Headquarters: Arbor, 255 Blackfriars Road; London, SE1 9AX; United Kingdom
- No. of offices: 9
- No. of lawyers: 380
- No. of employees: 577 (total staff)
- Key people: Lucy Lewis (Partner and Chair); Jo Farmer (Joint Managing Partner); Richard Miskella (Joint Managing Partner)
- Date founded: 1950
- Company type: Limited Liability Partnership
- Website: www.lewissilkin.com

Lewis Silkin LLP is a British law firm with offices in London, Oxford, Cardiff, Manchester, Leeds, Belfast, Dublin, Glasgow and Hong Kong. The firm has over 100 partners, 380 lawyers and a total staff of over 800 people. Lucy Lewis is Lewis Silkin's current Chair of the Partnership. Richard Miskella and Jo Farmer are the firm's Joint Managing Partners.

== History ==
The firm was established in 1950 in Rye Lane, Peckham, as "Lewis Silkin and Partners" by John Silkin, son of Lewis Silkin. Lewis joined the practice full-time in the 1950s after leaving the House of Commons and relinquishing some parliamentary duties he had undertaken on first becoming a peer. Lewis Silkin opened an office in Westminster in addition to the existing office in Peckham. The Westminster office specialised in planning law and development permits.

== rockhopper ==
In 2014, Lewis Silkin launched a fixed fee employment law service, rockhopper. rockhopper won the Best Innovation in the Working Families Best Practice 2018 awards.

== International ==
The firm is a member of two international networks: Ius Laboris, a global alliance of employment law specialist firms and the Global Advertising Lawyers Alliance.

== Charity and awards ==
The firm has taken part in charity fundraising events over the years, including the 3 Peaks Challenge in 2011, a 30-hour non-stop "Spinathon", staging a pantomime in 2012 and the 24 Peaks Challenge in 2015. The firm has been accredited by the Living Wage Foundation as a living wage employer since 2012.

In 2013, the firm took part in a charity shop takeover for Ty Hafan and Helen and Douglas House.

In 2014, the firm organised an "alternative" triathlon to raise money for Oxford Homeless Pathways. In 2014, the firm was awarded Best Social Mobility Program at the Managing Partners Forum awards.

== See also ==
- Lewis Silkin, 1st Baron Silkin
