= Borderless Magazine =

- Website type: News
- Available in: English, Spanish, others
- Founders: Nissa Rhee, Executive Director and Cofounder; Michelle Kanaar, Art Director and Cofounder
- Website: borderlessmag.org

Borderless Magazine is a Chicago-based online magazine that reports on immigration, labor, justice, and advocacy issues throughout the Midwestern United States.

== History ==
Borderless started in 2017 as the "90 Days, 90 Voices" project by Sarah Conway, Alex Hernandez and Nissa Rhee, with a focus on local immigrant communities. 90 Days, 90 Voices incorporated as a nonprofit organization in 2018. In October 2019, the name of the organization changed to Borderless Magazine.

== Overview ==
Borderless is a non-profit, independent media organization, and is a member of the Institute for Nonprofit News. Articles are often published in multiple languages, including versions in Spanish, Arabic, Mandarin Chinese, Tagalog, and other languages.
