= Gregg Wallace =

English broadcaster and writer (born 1964)

Gregg Wallace MBE
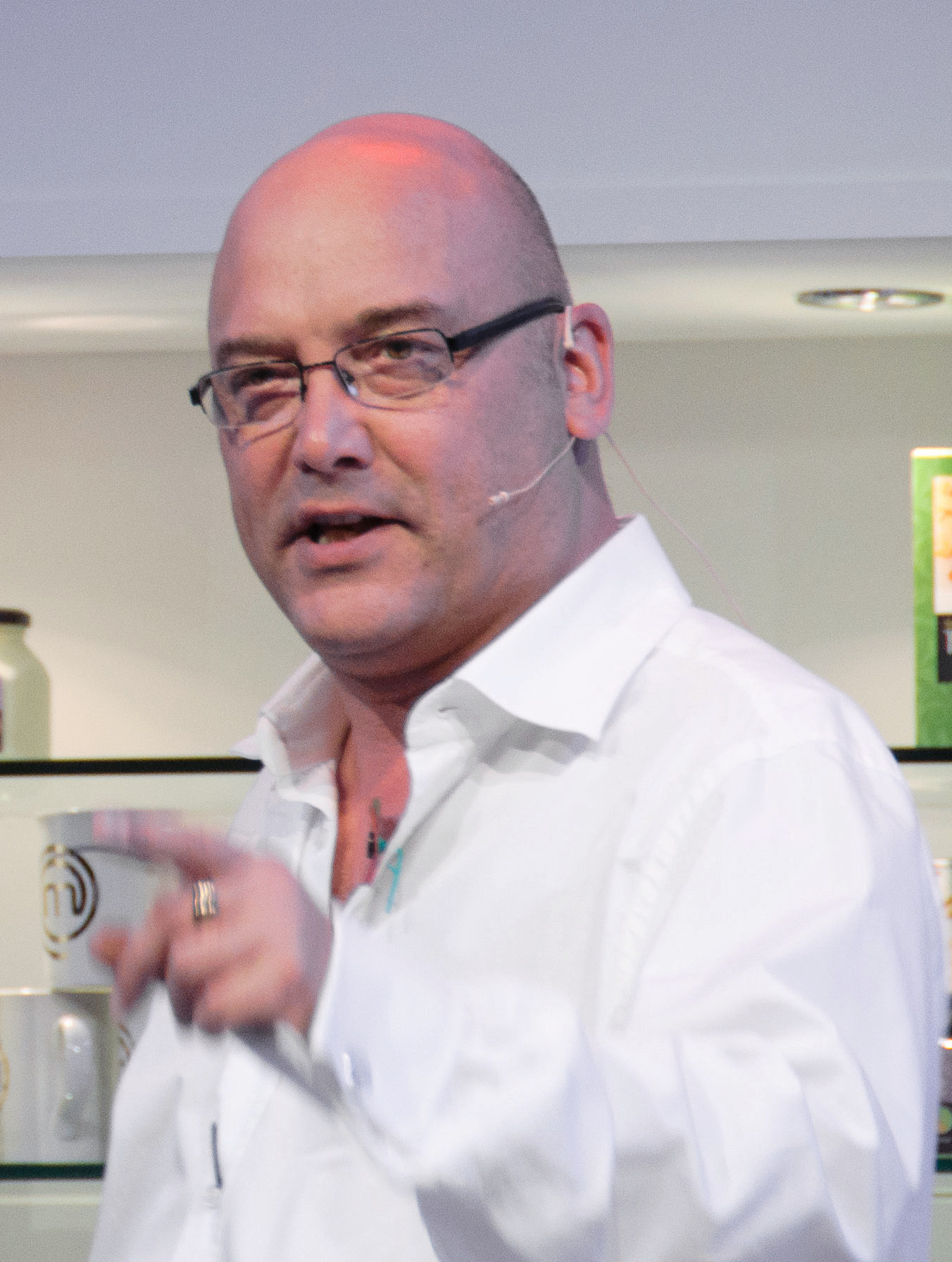
- Wallace judging at MasterChef Live in 2010
- Born: Gregg Allan Wallace; 17 October 1964 (age 62); Peckham, London, England
- Occupations: Broadcaster; entrepreneur; writer
- Years active: 2002–2024
- Employer: BBC
- Television: Saturday Kitchen; MasterChef; Eat Well for Less?; Inside the Factory; Time Commanders
- Spouses: Christine (m. 1991, divorced); Denise Lovell (m. 1999; div. 2004); Heidi Brown (m. 2011; div. 2012); Anne-Marie Sterpini (m. 2016)
- Children: 3
- Website: greggwallace.com

Gregg Allan Wallace (born 17 October 1964) is an English broadcaster, entrepreneur and writer. He is known for co-presenting MasterChef, Celebrity MasterChef and MasterChef: The Professionals on BBC One and BBC Two. He has written for Good Food, Now and Olive.

== Early life and business career ==
Gregg Allan Wallace was born on 17 October 1964 in Peckham, South London. At the age of eight, he was sexually assaulted by a babysitter's husband, but did not tell anybody at the time. He left school at 15 and started work as a warehouseman at Covent Garden Fruit and Veg Market, selling vegetables at a stand in Covent Garden. In 1989, he started George Allan's Greengrocers, a company that grew to a turnover of £7.5 million.

In 2010, Wallace opened the restaurant Wallace & Co in the London district of Putney, where he served as one of the directors. In 2012, he opened Gregg's Bar & Grill in a joint venture with the Bermondsey Square Hotel. In August 2013, it was reported that one of Wallace's companies, West Veg Limited, had folded, owing more than £500,000. In 2014, both of his restaurants folded, with Wallace & Co owing suppliers £150,000.

== Broadcasting career ==
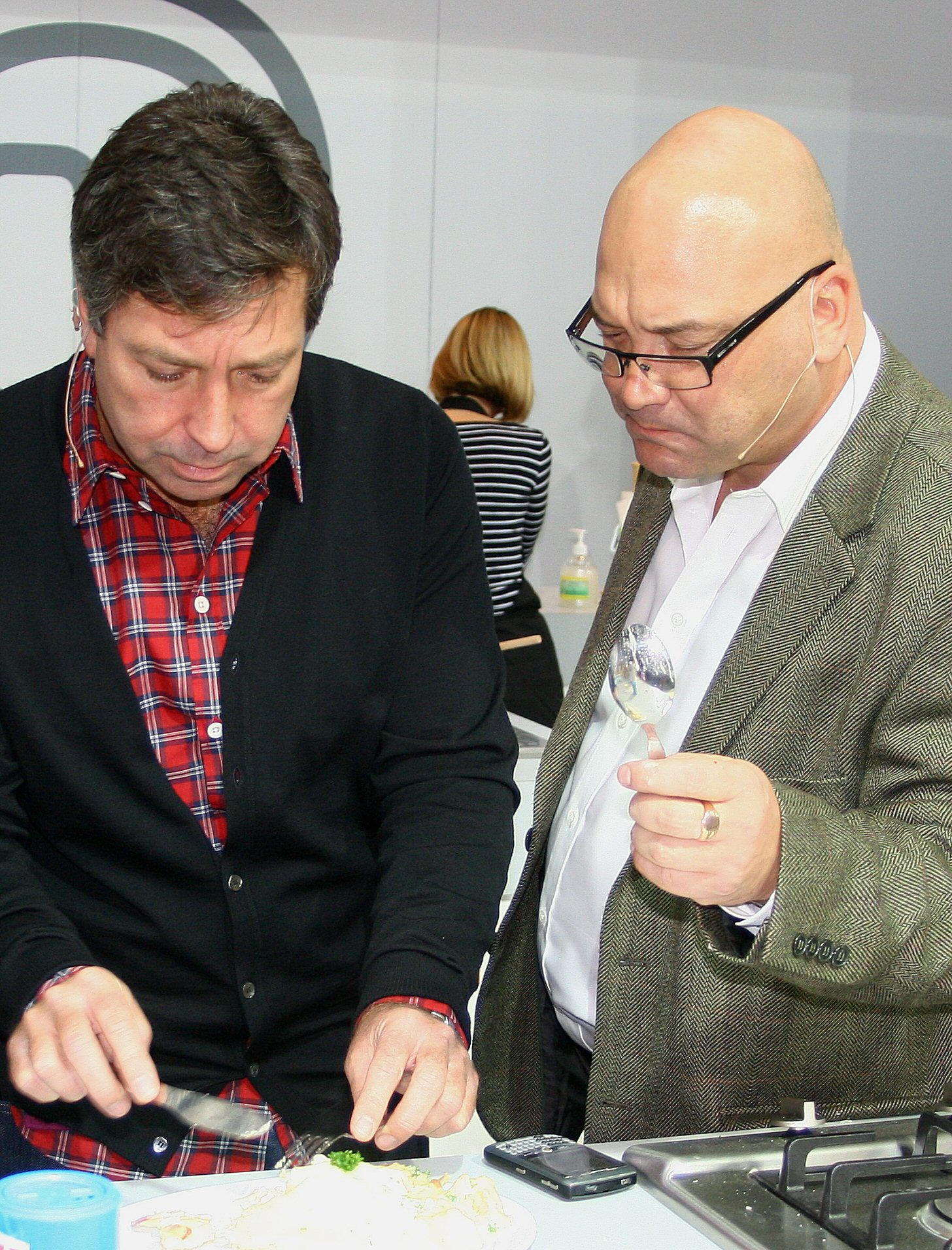
Wallace (right) with John Torode at MasterChef Live in 2009

Wallace was invited to co-present Veg Talk on BBC Radio 4 with Charlie Hicks. The programme aired for seven years from 1998 to 2005; Andy Kershaw described it as being "delivered with this fake, barrow-boy bonhomie."

Wallace was the original presenter of Saturday Kitchen from 2002 until being replaced by Antony Worrall Thompson in 2003. Wallace also presented Veg Out for the Discovery Channel, and Follow That Tomato for The Food Channel, resulting in a Royal Television Society award for Best Lifestyle Programme in 2003.

In 2008 and 2009, Wallace presented two editions of The Money Programme on the effect that the 2008 financial crisis was having on the public's attitudes towards food. In August 2013, Wallace presented Supermarket Secrets, a BBC One programme about supermarket food sourcing and distribution, and in September 2013, he co-presented Harvest 2013, a three-part documentary following the progress of Britain's vegetable, cereal and fruit harvests.

In 2013, Wallace started to co-present Eat Well for Less? alongside Chris Bavin for BBC One, and from 2015 until 2023 he co-presented Inside the Factory, alongside Cherry Healey and Ruth Goodman for BBC Two. In 2016, Wallace was the presenter of a revived series of the BBC historical game show Time Commanders.

In December 2019, Wallace presented a Channel 5 documentary called Gregg Wallace's Magical Christmas Market, filmed in Vienna, Austria. In April 2020, Channel 5 scheduled a follow-up series called Gregg Wallace's Fun Weekends, but it was pulled because it featured cities badly impacted by the COVID-19 pandemic. The four-part travel series was finally transmitted in February 2021 as Big Weekends with Gregg Wallace (also known as Gregg Wallace: Big Weekends Away) with the first episode being about Barcelona.

In February 2021, Wallace presented a six-part ITV series called South Africa with Gregg Wallace. In the series, he visited sites such as Isandlwana, the Augrabies Falls, Durban and the Orange River. In this month it was reported that Kimberley Walsh was likely to replace Wallace as presenter of Eat Well For Less, after Wallace left the show after eight years.

In December 2021, Wallace presented two Channel 5 Christmas specials: Gregg Wallace's Grand Christmas Adventure and Gregg Wallace's Magical Christmas Market. In July 2023, Wallace presented Gregg Wallace: The British Miracle Meat, a mockumentary which depicted a British company that had developed food technology to produce genetically engineered human meat.

=== MasterChef ===
Between 2005 and 2024, Wallace was co-presenter and judge of BBC cooking show MasterChef, with John Torode. In December 2024 Wallace was replaced by the food critic Grace Dent. In March 2018, Wallace declined to judge Zaleha Kadir Olpin's dish on MasterChef, stating that the stewed chicken rendang dish was "not crispy enough and could not be eaten". This remark was criticised by some social media users in Southeast Asian countries such as Malaysia, Indonesia and Singapore, who said on Twitter that rendang is a "stewed, soft and tender dish: not intended to be crispy".

=== Guest appearances ===
In 2007, Wallace appeared in the BBC singing contest Just the Two of Us where he partnered with professional singer Carol Decker. The duo were the first to be eliminated. In 2010, Wallace appeared in the BBC One series Turn Back Time: The High Street with Tom Herbert and Juliet Gardiner. On 27 January 2012, Wallace appeared in an episode of Room 101 on BBC One. In August 2012, Wallace was the subject of an episode of the BBC genealogy show Who Do You Think You Are?

Wallace appeared as a guest panellist on the BBC Two programme An Extra Slice In 2014, a contestant in Series 7 of the ITV quiz show The Chase Celebrity Special in 2017, a contestant on Celebrity Catchphrase in 2019, a contestant on the sixth series of Tipping Point: Lucky Stars in 2020, a contestant on the third series of The Chase spin off, Beat the Chasers in 2021, and a celebrity expert on the 2021 Christmas special of The Wheel.

In September 2014 Wallace was a contestant on the twelfth series of BBC's Strictly Come Dancing, partnered with professional Aliona Vilani. In the first week Wallace danced a Cha-cha-cha to Katy Perry's "Hot n Cold". During the judges' comments, Wallace joked about the lack of success shown by Craig Revel Horwood in a previous series of Celebrity Masterchef. He left the show in the second week, after the first public vote, when the Waltz danced by Jennifer Gibney and Tristan MacManus was preferred by the judges to Vilani and Wallace's Charleston.

== Allegations of misconduct ==
In November 2024, it was reported that Wallace was to step away from MasterChef while allegations of historical misconduct were investigated. This came after the BBC reported to Wallace's representatives that there were allegations of inappropriate sexual comments from 13 individuals. Wallace's lawyers said it is entirely false that he engages in behaviour of a sexually harassing nature. Wallace was subsequently dropped by the charity Ambitious about Autism which had appointed him as an ambassador in honour of his autistic son. In April 2025 Wallace said he had been diagnosed with autism, stating he was "very slow to wake up" to a changing work environment. He said: "I honestly never meant to upset anyone. I didn't realise I was causing any problems."

In August 2021, the television and radio presenter Melanie Sykes had been a competitor on the programme, but Sykes later said that a comment from Wallace had led her to end her career in the entertainment industry.

In December 2024, in response to the accusations against him, Wallace posted a video to Instagram saying there had been "13 complaints" from "over 4,000 contestants" he had worked with in 20 years on the BBC show MasterChef. On 2 December 2024, Wallace apologised for suggesting that allegations against him came from "a handful of middle-class women of a certain age". On 3 December, the BBC announced that two forthcoming MasterChef special episodes and three repeats of an old series of Inside the Factory, had been pulled from the Christmas schedule while the allegations against Wallace were still being investigated. Wallace later said that he had received "a tidal wave of abuse" on social media after posting the video on Instagram.

On 4 December 2024, allegations of sexual harassment were made by the ghostwriter of Wallace's autobiography, Life On A Plate. The former head of BBC News, Roger Mosey, stated that the allegations against Wallace were a "blow to the BBC" which has had a long-standing problem with misbehaviour by some of its presenters.

In January 2025, singer Sir Rod Stewart criticised Wallace on social media for humiliating his wife Penny Lancaster on the MasterChef programme. Wallace said in April 2025 there had been a "falling out" between himself and Lancaster over "whether an orchid should stay on a bowl of soup or not". He said the criticism was a "shame" as he liked Stewart.

It was reported that former Newsnight presenter Kirsty Wark was among the 13 people who had accused Wallace of making inappropriate sexual comments on the show. Wallace said he was unaware he had offended Wark until the complaint became known in 2024, stating: "I thought we got on." In April 2025 Wallace said he felt "under attack" due to the allegations about him and that he had contemplated suicide. He said he had never groped any workers, describing claims of groping as "absolutely not true".

=== BBC response and independent report ===
In July 2025, it was reported that Wallace had been cautioned by a BBC executive in 2019 that continued inappropriate behaviour could result in the termination of his working relationship with the broadcaster. Despite subsequent complaints, he remained employed. On 14 July 2025, the BBC released a statement in response to the findings of an independent investigation into Wallace's conduct, substantiating 45 out of 83 allegations spanning a 19-year period between 2005 and 2024. These included inappropriate sexual language, culturally insensitive remarks, and a single incident involving unwelcome physical contact. The corporation stated that Wallace's behaviour "falls below the values of the BBC" and confirmed that it has "no plans to work with him in the future."

Prior to the report's publication, Wallace issued a public statement claiming he had been cleared of the "most serious and sensational accusations", while criticising the BBC for "peddling baseless and sensationalised gossip" and stating, "I will not go quietly." In the same statement, he disclosed a recent autism diagnosis, alleging that the BBC failed to investigate or accommodate his neurodivergence and describing the MasterChef working environment as "dangerous" for someone with his condition.

=== Autism advocates responses ===
Wallace's comments drew criticism from some disability charities and neurodivergence advocates, who said that his use of autism as a defence risked stigmatising autistic people. Emily Banks, founder of neurodiversity training body Enna, said autism "doesn't absolve anyone of responsibility", while a spokesperson for the National Autistic Society stressed the importance of avoiding generalisations.

=== Lewis Silkin report summary ===
An executive summary of a report by Lewis Silkin LLP for Banijay Entertainment was published on 14 July 2025.

45 of the 83 complaints against Wallace were substantiated. Wallace was found to have made people feel uncomfortable, and was only occasionally challenged at the time. Many people working on Masterchef were freelancers who were reluctant to complain because their positions were not permanent. Policies dealing with inappropriate behaviour were inadequate before 2016. Wallace received a formal warning after a 2017 complaint. The report mentioned his autism diagnosis as significant, though the report said that Wallace thought it might explain some of his actions but he didn't want to hide behind it.

Substantiated allegations
Complaint	2005–2011	2012–2018	2019–2024	Total
Sexually explicit comments	14	2		16
Inappropriate comments (jokes and innuendo)	6	5	1	12
Bullying	3	4		7
Culturally insensitive/racist comments	1	3		4
Being in a state of undress	2	1		3
Sexualised comments (to or about someone)		2		2
Unwanted physical contact	1			1

== Personal life ==
Wallace married his first wife, Christine, in 1991 but their marriage lasted only six weeks. He was married to former pastry chef Denise Lovell from 1999 to 2004, with whom he has a son, born in 1994, and daughter, born in 1997. Wallace later married biology teacher Heidi Brown, his third wife who was 17 years younger than him, after meeting her on Twitter, on 8 January 2011 at Coworth Park Hotel in Sunningdale, near Ascot, Berkshire. The relationship ended after 15 months.

Wallace met Anne-Marie Sterpini, 21 years his junior, also on Twitter, in 2013 and they married on 6 August 2016 at Hever Castle in Hever, Kent. Masterchef co-host John Torode served as best man at the wedding. Sterpini gave birth to their first child, a son in 2019. They live in Biddenden, Kent. Wallace publicly expressed his fears of being an "old parent" but said that he was considering having more children. Wallace's son was diagnosed with autism in 2022. In February 2024, Wallace told the Telegraph that having another child "isn't something that I would have chosen at my age," but that he did it to please his wife.

Wallace was appointed Member of the Order of the British Empire (MBE) in the 2022 Birthday Honours for services to food and charity. Wallace has a tattoo of Millwall F.C. on his chest. He has supported the club since childhood and took part in football hooliganism in his youth. At one time Wallace was a rugby coach for an under-15s side in Liverpool.

== Bibliography ==
- Veg: The Greengrocer's Cookbook. Mitchell Beazley. 2006. ISBN 9781845332242
- A Cook's Year: How to Choose and Cook with Great Ingredients. Mitchell Beazley. 2008. ISBN 9781845333270
- Veg: The Cookbook. Octopus Publishing Group. 2009. ISBN 9781845334536
- Gregg's Favourite Puddings. Octopus Publishing Group. 2010. ISBN 9780600621430
- Great British Food Revival: The Revolution Continues: 16 Celebrated Chefs Create Mouth-watering Recipes with the UK's Finest Ingredients. Orion Publishing Group. 2011. ISBN 9780297867678
- Life on a Plate: The Autobiography. Orion Publishing Group. 2012. ISBN 9781409139218
- Gregg's Italian Family Cookbook. Octopus Books. 2019. ISBN 9781784725914
