= John Torode =

Australian and British celebrity chef (born 1965)

John Torode MBE
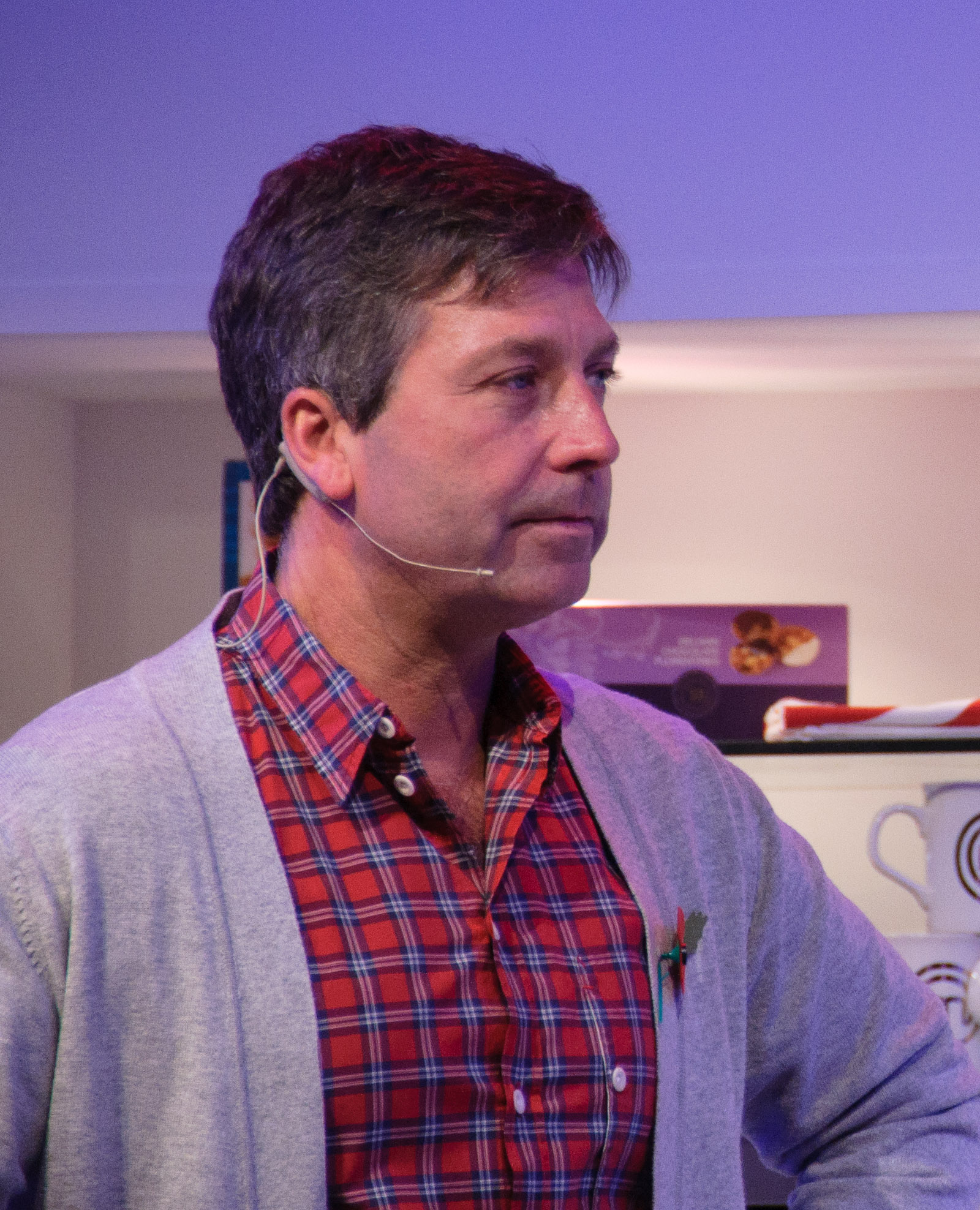
- Torode in 2010
- Born: John Douglas Torode; 23 July 1965 (age 61); Melbourne, Australia
- Occupations: Broadcaster, celebrity chef, restaurateur
- Years active: 1990s–present
- Employer: BBC (until 2025)
- Television: MasterChef
- Spouses: Jessica Thomas (m. 2000; div. 2014); Lisa Faulkner (m. 2019)
- Children: 4

John Douglas Torode (born 23 July 1965) is an Australian and British celebrity chef and TV presenter. He moved to the UK in the 1990s and began working at Conran Group's restaurants. After first appearing on television on ITV's This Morning, he started presenting a revamped MasterChef on BBC One in 2005 until 2025. He is a restaurateur; former owner of the Luxe and a second restaurant, Smiths of Smithfield. He has also written a number of cookbooks, including Sydney to Seoul, My Kind of Food and John and Lisa's Kitchen with his wife Lisa Faulkner. Torode was appointed Member of the Order of the British Empire (MBE) in the 2022 Birthday Honours for services to food and charity.

== Early life ==
John Douglas Torode was born on 23 July 1965 as the youngest of three boys in Melbourne, Victoria, but, between the ages of four (when his mother died) and ten, he and his brother Andrew lived in Maitland, New South Wales, with his grandmother, who taught him to cook. He then lived in Edithvale, Melbourne, with his father and his brothers, though his father was frequently away from home because of work.

His early cooking career started at Le Coq Au Vin restaurant in Aspendale and his later apprenticeship was at several establishments in Beaumaris, both in Melbourne. He has said that the food in his childhood was fairly normal, and roast chicken remains one of his favourite dishes because of the connection to his childhood, although his favourite meal at that time was crumbed lamb cutlets.

== Career ==
Torode began his cooking career at the age of 16, after leaving school to attend catering college. He moved to the United Kingdom in 1991. A year later, he began working at Le Pont de la Tour and Quaglino's as a sous-chef for the Conran Group under Terence Conran. While working at Quaglino's, Torode first met Gregg Wallace, whose company supplied the vegetables for the restaurant.

He started cooking on ITV's This Morning in 1996, and his role as a successful guest chef is ongoing. In 1998, his cookbook The Mezzo Cookbook won the James Beard Foundation Award for "Best Food Photography". He opened his former restaurant in Smithfield, London in 2000, called Smiths of Smithfield. After a year, he opened a second restaurant, called Cafeteria, near Notting Hill Gate. Its closure made way for larger projects.

Torode has presented a show for the Good Food channel in the UK alongside former Celebrity MasterChef contestant Hardeep Singh Kohli, called New British Kitchen. The show aimed to feature the impact of imported cuisines in Britain. Other television work has included an appearance on the BBC's The Magicians, which saw Torode and Wallace participate in a stunt by magicians Barry and Stuart which hung the pair off the side of the Tate Modern in London. In 2001, Torode shot a 12-part series for Taste CFN called Sea Breeze in which he travelled around the Balearic Islands cooking with local chefs and visiting popular tourist attractions.

He presented the 2014 series John Torode's Australia; the 10 episodes retrace the flavours of John Torode's childhood and the people that inspired his passion for food as he travels the country to go back in time. It has been hosted on BBC Good Food and had three reruns. John Torode's Australia was also recorded as having the largest viewing figures on Good Food in 2014. In 2015, he presented John Torode's Argentina as part of the BBC Two series A Cook Abroad, looking specifically at the country's production, cooking and consumption of beef.

Torode's 2016 show, John Torode's Malaysian Adventure, aired on the Good Food channel throughout the early part of 2016. The 10-part series, filmed throughout Malaysia and the UK, explored Malaysian cuisine.

The Korean Food Tour (2017, Good Food Channel) saw Torode travel around South Korea and work his way through some of the nation's top 100 dishes, creating his own version of Korean classics with a modern twist.

Torode's food tours led to his 2017/2018 culinary adventure John Torode's Asia. This premiered on the Good Food channel. In each location, Torode looked for the most inspiring cooks, discovering the distinctive flavours of their country's cuisine. Cooking on location with local chefs, each episode saw several dishes created, popular and typical of their region.

In 2018, John Torode's Middle East (10 x 30 minutes) produced by Blink Films, featured the chef as he travelled across the region to find delicious food.

In March 2019, Torode, along with actress and food writer Lisa Faulkner, was given his own weekend cooking show. They host John And Lisa's Weekend Kitchen on Sunday mornings on ITV.

On 21 July 2022, John Torode's Ireland premiered on Food Network, the six-part series sees the chef discovering Ireland's varied cuisine.

In June 2022, Torode was appointed Member of the Order of the British Empire (MBE) in the Queen’s Birthday Honours, recognising his contributions to food and charitable initiatives. He received the award from Prince William during a ceremony at Buckingham Palace in 2023.

During early 2024, Torode and Lisa Faulkner presented John & Lisa's Food Trip Down Under; a five-part ITV1 series about Western Australia's food and drink.

=== MasterChef ===
In 2005, the BBC television show MasterChef was relaunched with an updated format and with Torode and Wallace as presenters replacing Gary Rhodes. Torode was chosen instead of food critic A. A. Gill. By 2011, the show had been sold to 25 countries. Torode said in interviews that he enjoyed that the show is unscripted and that the cameras are just there to capture the genuine interactions between the judges and the contestants. The show subsequently spawned a spin-off, also hosted by Torode and Wallace, called Celebrity MasterChef. In October 2009, Torode opened a restaurant in Spitalfields market, Commercial street, London, called The Luxe. He sold his shares and moved on from the two restaurants, but under his leadership, turnover at the Luxe and Smiths of Smithfield reached £9.2 million.

He has also co-presented Junior MasterChef, initially along with Nadia Sawalha, the former winner of Celebrity MasterChef, and more recently alongside Donal Skehan.

In July 2025, Torode said he was accused of using racist language, upheld as part of an inquiry commissioned by production company Banijay into allegations of sexual harassment by co-host Gregg Wallace. In a statement on Instagram, Torode said the allegation was that he made the remarks in 2018 or 2019 and that he had apologised immediately afterwards. Torode said he had "no recollection of the incident" and was "shocked and saddened" by the allegation. Following the upheld allegation, Banijay UK and the BBC confirmed that Torode's contract would not be renewed, effectively ending his role on MasterChef.

=== Guest appearances ===
Torode has been a guest several times on BBC One's The One Show, Alan Carr: Chatty Man and The Graham Norton Show, and on ITV's Loose Women and This Morning. On 23 July 2014 (as a keen cyclist), Torode was a guest on ITV4's The Cycle Show.

== Personal life ==
Torode has four children. He was married to Jessica, in 2000, the mother of his son and daughter but was reportedly divorced in 2014 after separating in 2011. He also has two other children from previous relationships.

Torode has been in a relationship with actress and Celebrity Masterchef winner Lisa Faulkner since 2015. The couple married on 24 October 2019 at Aynhoe Park, Oxfordshire.

== Published works ==
- Torode, John; Francis, Sarah; Conran, Terence; Murphy, James; Miller, Diana (1997). The Mezzo Cookbook. London: Conran Octopus. ISBN 9781850299226.
- Torode, John (1999). Relax – It's Only Food. London: Quadrille. ISBN 9781902757162.
- Torode, John (1999). Torode's Thai Trip. London: Granada Media. ISBN 9780233996493.
- Torode, John (2005). MasterChef Goes Large. London: Ebury. ISBN 9780091905576.
- Torode, John (2007). Good Mood Food. London: Quadrille. ISBN 9781844004485.
- Torode, John (2008). John Torode's Beef. London: Quadrille. ISBN 9781844006236.
- Torode, John (2009). John Torode's Chicken and Other Birds. London: Quadrille. ISBN 9781844007158.
- Torode, John (2011). Everyday MasterChef. London: Dorling Kindersley. ISBN 9781405394352.
- Torode, John; Wallace, Gregg (2011). MasterChef Kitchen Bible. London: Dorling Kindersley. ISBN 9781405394178.
- Torode, John (2015). My Kind of Food. London: Headline Publishing Group. ISBN 978-1-4722-2585-6.
- Torode, John (2019) Sydney To Seoul. London: Headline Publishing Group. ISBN 9781472225863
- Torode, John; Lisa, Faulkner (2024). John and Lisa's Kitchen. London: Quadrille. ISBN 978-1837832569.
- Torode, John; Lisa, Faulkner (2026). John & Lisa's Weeknight Dinners. London: Quadrille. ISBN 978-1837836512.
