= Panti Bliss =

Irish drag queen and gay rights campaigner

- Panti Bliss in 2025
- Born: Rory O'Neill; 16 November 1968 (age 57); Ballinrobe, County Mayo, Ireland
- Occupations: Drag queen, activist, publican and businessperson
- Spouse: Anderson Cabrera (m. 2019)
- Website: Official website

Rory O'Neill (born 16 November 1968) is an Irish drag queen and gay rights activist from Ballinrobe, County Mayo, known by the stage names Panti, Panti Bliss and Pandora Panti Bliss. Panti is widely considered Ireland's foremost drag performer, a reputation built over more than three decades of cabaret, club hosting and broadcasting.

Panti came to international attention in February 2014, when a speech about homophobia delivered at the Abbey Theatre in Dublin, made amid a controversy that became known as "Pantigate", was shared online and viewed hundreds of thousands of times within days. The speech, and Bliss's subsequent prominence during the campaign ahead of the 2015 marriage equality referendum, led some commentators to describe Panti as "the Queen of Ireland", also the title of a 2015 documentary charting Panti's life and career.

Beyond activism, Panti Bliss runs Pantibar and Pennylane, two Dublin bars, has published a memoir, and has appeared in film, television and theatre, including a sixth-place finish on the sixth series of Dancing with the Stars in 2023. Panti has continued to campaign on LGBTQ+ issues, including HIV/AIDS awareness, and has spoken publicly about a perceived rise in hostility towards the LGBTQ+ community in Ireland since 2015.

== Early life ==
O'Neill, the fifth of six children of a veterinary surgeon and a mother who served as a minister of the Eucharist, grew up in Ballinrobe, County Mayo. O’Neill boarded at Gormanston College, a Franciscan school in County Meath during the 1980s, at a time when the bursar, Father Ronald Bennett, was later convicted of indecently assaulting boys at the school; O’Neill has said the abuse was widely known among students but that O’Neill was not targeted. O'Neill has said that Bennett’s role as bursar meant students seeking money had to approach him, and that his concurrent responsibility for teaching sex education to first and second years created a bizarre and troubling dynamic.

O'Neill later went to art college in Dún Laoghaire to study graphic design. Although raised a Catholic, O'Neill is an atheist. As a child, O'Neill drew in a style influenced by old Hollywood glamour illustration and had not considered performing as a career.

O'Neill has described feeling deeply isolated as a gay teenager growing up in rural Ireland in the 1970s, recalling in a 2014 interview the sense that "I thought I was the only gay in the world". O'Neill came out at 19, first to a sister and then to parents. O'Neill has said that the father was unconcerned, while the mother, a devout Catholic, took longer to reconcile the news with religious faith, helped by a brother who was a priest in England. The family remained close afterwards, and O'Neill has said that concealing a major part of one's life from parents can otherwise reduce a relationship to something closer to acquaintance.

The summer before O'Neill's final year of art college, O'Neill moved to London, where O'Neill met the performance artist Leigh Bowery and worked at a restaurant near Drury Lane. Exposure to Bowery, and to London's club scene more broadly, encouraged O'Neill to design a drag show as a final-year college project, having until then given no thought to drag as a viable career.

== Career ==
=== Early career and the origins of Panti (1989–1995) ===
Panti is short for "Pandora Panti Bliss". Their first drag performance was in 1989, at Sides nightclub in Dublin, following O'Neill's final-year college project. After graduating college, O'Neill was offered work as a waiter by the manager of Sides, who had seen the student performance, and began performing drag on the Dublin club scene. O'Neill went on to work at the Elephant and Castle bar in Temple Bar before, in 1990, travelling overland through Hungary, Russia and China to Japan.

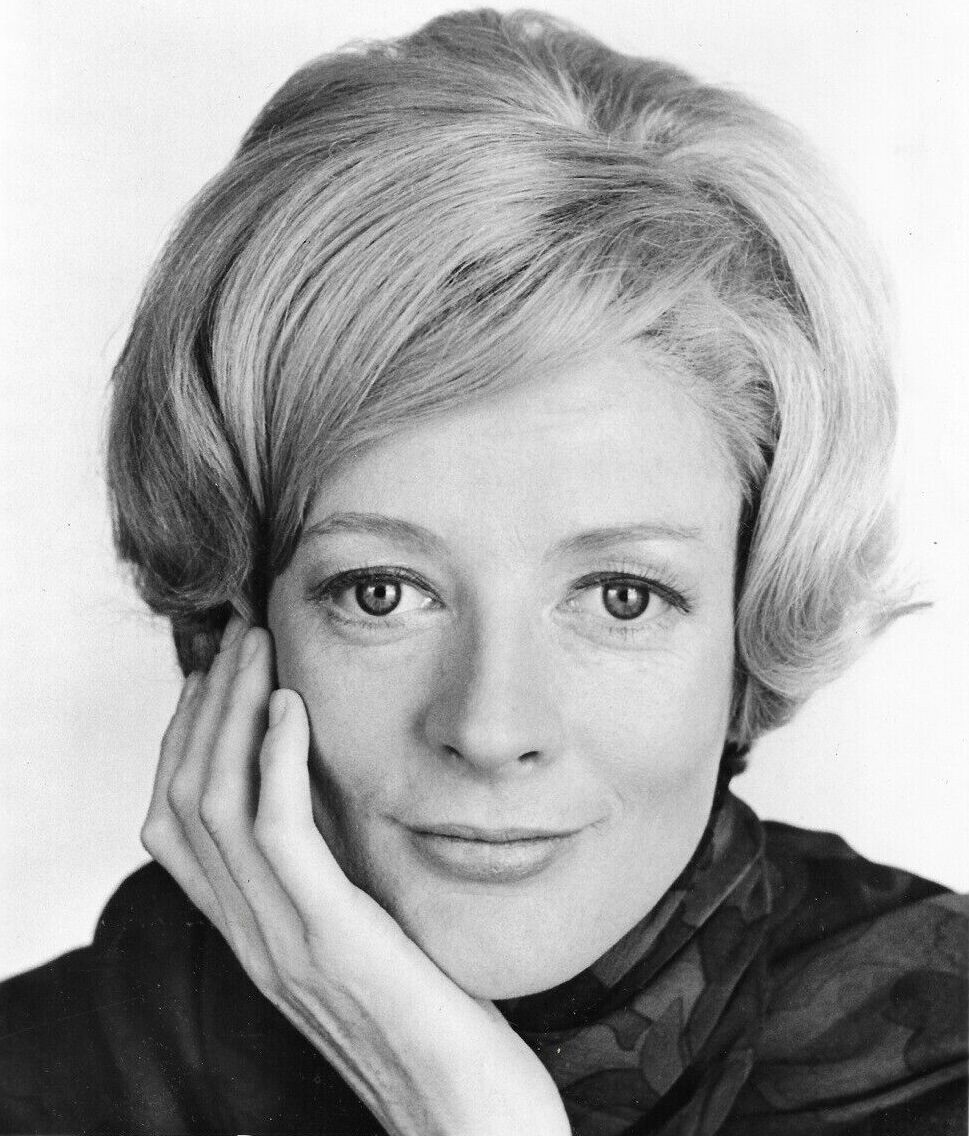
Maggie Smith was an early influence on the character of Panti Bliss

O'Neill lived in Japan for between four and five years, initially performing under the name "Leticia", after a pet sheep from childhood. The name Panti was coined in Japan, where O'Neill formed a double act called CandiPanti with the American drag performer Lurleen. Panti danced on stage in Japan with Cyndi Lauper during the 1994 Twelve Deadly Cyns Tour. O'Neill returned to Ireland in 1995 and began performing at Dublin clubs including The Kitchen and Pod, gradually turning club performance into a paid vocation. Bliss has since cited Maggie Smith's performance in the 1969 film The Prime of Miss Jean Brodie as a significant influence on Panti's manner and dress.

In 2014, O'Neill talked to Aoibhinn Ní Shúilleabháin about having been diagnosed as HIV-positive in 1995 on the RTÉ Radio 1 series Aoibhinn and Company.

=== Dublin drag scene and Alternative Miss Ireland (1996–2013) ===
Panti regularly hosts the annual Dublin Pride celebrations, which take place in June every year. From 1996 to 2012, Panti hosted the annual Alternative Miss Ireland pageant. During this period, Panti also co-organised several influential Dublin club nights, including GAG, Powderbubble and HAM, often working with the designer Niall Sweeney.

For a number of years, Panti hosted a weekly karaoke show, The Casting Couch, at The Front Lounge pub, Dublin, and occasionally appears at Shirley Temple Bar's weekly drag bingo night at The George.

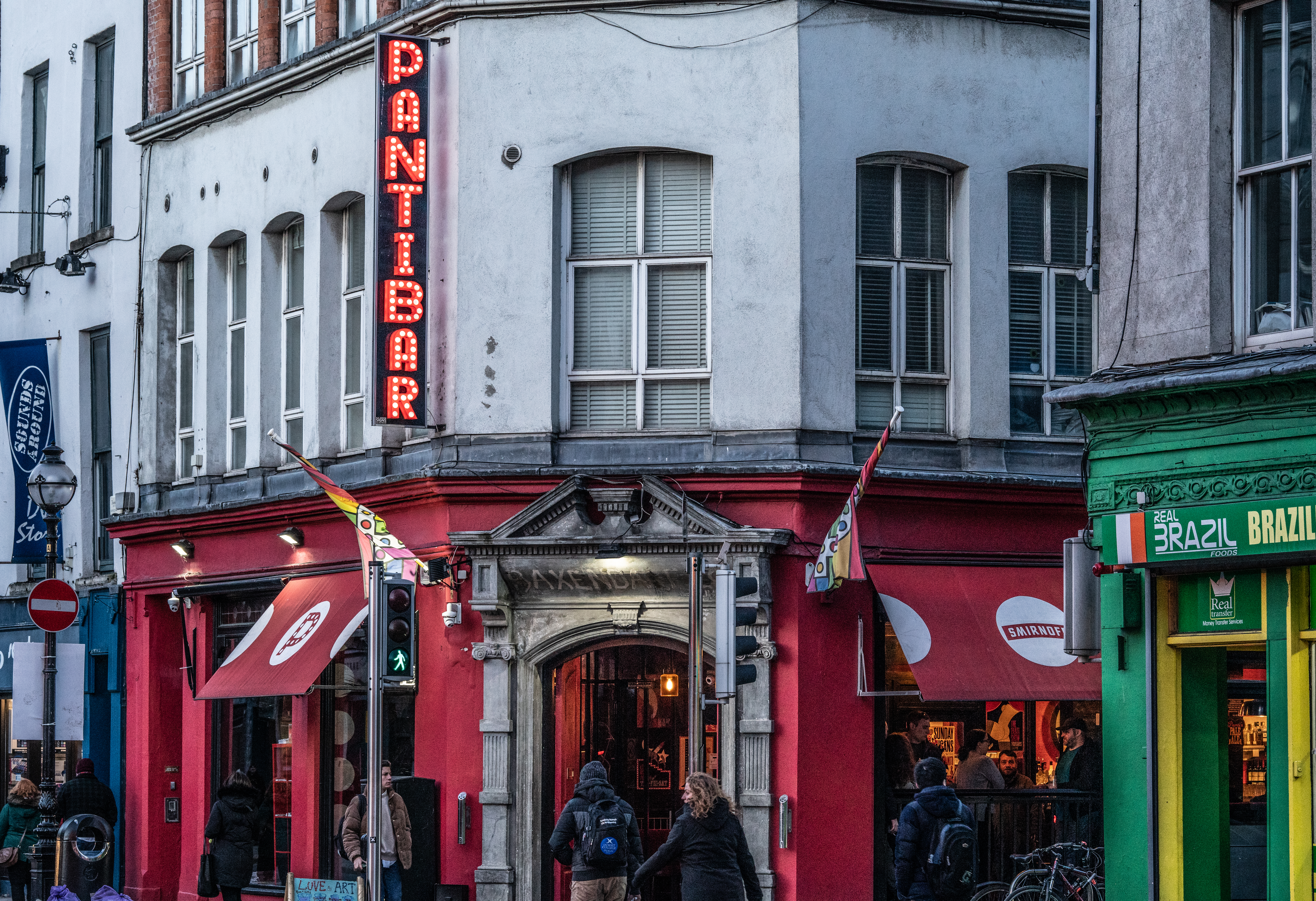
Pantibar on Capel Street, Dublin in 2019

On 30 November 2007, Panti opened the self-titled Pantibar at 7 Capel Street, Dublin. The bar opened shortly before the 2008 financial crisis, and O'Neill has said that its first five years were difficult, with many customers emigrating or going out less. In 2009, following a poorly attended protest for marriage rights, O'Neill wrote a blog post criticising apathy among LGBTQ+ people for not marching for their own equality; the post has since been described as a turning point that helped mobilise support for the marriage equality movement in Ireland. In September 2009, Panti brought the one-woman show A Woman in Progress to the Project Arts Centre in Dublin as part of the Dublin Theatre Festival.

=== Pantigate and the Noble Call speech (2014) ===
On 11 January 2014, O'Neill appeared on RTÉ's The Saturday Night Show with Brendan O'Connor, where the pair discussed homophobia, and O'Neill alleged that specific people involved in Irish journalism were homophobic. This became known as "Pantigate". In the interview, O'Neill referred to the columnists John Waters and Breda O'Brien, and to the Iona Institute, a Catholic advocacy group.

Waters, O'Brien and members of the Iona Institute, among them David Quinn, Patricia Casey and John Murray, sent solicitors' letters to RTÉ immediately after the interview. RTÉ subsequently removed that section of the interview from their online archive. On the 25 January episode of the Saturday Night Show, O'Connor issued a public apology on behalf of RTÉ to those named in the earlier interview. RTÉ paid a total of €85,000 to six people: Waters, O'Brien and four members of the Iona Institute. O'Neill also received solicitors' letters personally from Waters, O'Brien, Quinn and Casey, but the threat of legal action against O'Neill was not pursued.

The settlement drew hundreds of complaints to RTÉ, and more than 2,000 people gathered in Dublin city centre to protest at the broadcaster's handling of the debate on homophobia. The payouts were later discussed by members of the Oireachtas, and RTÉ was called before an Oireachtas communications committee. The incident was also discussed in the European Parliament. Irish MEP Paul Murphy called the payout "a real attack on the freedom of speech" and cited specific examples of what Murphy characterised as homophobic public commentary, stating "When John Waters says that gay marriage is 'a kind of satire', that is homophobia. When Breda O'Brien says 'equality must take second place to the common good', that is homophobia. When the Iona Institute campaign against gay marriage because it is gay marriage, that is homophobia". RTÉ's head of television defended the €85,000 payout, stating that it saved RTÉ "an absolute multiple" in the long term.

In a subsequent interview, O'Neill said the subject of homophobia arose naturally once O'Connor, whom O'Neill did not blame personally, put the word to O'Neill directly and asked for names. In February 2014, O'Neill said on Today FM's The Ray D'Arcy Show that no public apology from RTÉ was expected, but that O'Neill wanted a personal apology from RTÉ's head of television, Glen Killane, because the broadcaster's apology had given the impression that O'Neill was a "rogue guest". Waters took extended leave from his weekly column in The Irish Times, which had not appeared since 31 January 2014. O'Brien told RTÉ Radio 1's Marian Finucane that RTÉ could have avoided the dispute by apologising promptly, and described a "chilling effect" on people who questioned same-sex marriage.

On 1 February 2014, Panti responded to the RTÉ controversy by giving a "Noble Call" speech at the Abbey Theatre, a tradition in which an artist is invited to speak publicly on a significant contemporary issue, often departing from the theatre's usual programme. Panti's speech garnered over 200,000 views in two days. By December 2018 the video had nearly one million views. The speech was described as "the most eloquent Irish speech" in almost 200 years by Fintan O'Toole and garnered the support of Dan Savage, RuPaul, Graham Norton, Stephen Fry, Madonna, Martina Navratilova and others. O'Neill has described the moment of being tweeted by Navratilova, a childhood sporting hero, as a personal high point of the period. T-shirts with "I'm on Team Panti" were sold as a fundraiser for BeLonG To Youth Services, raising over €10,000. In March 2014, the English duo Pet Shop Boys released the speech, set to their own music, as "Oppressive (The Best Gay Possible)", followed by a "slow mix" of the track with an accompanying video.

In June 2014, Panti's one-woman show High Heels in Low Places played Vicar Street in Dublin and the Cork Opera House. O'Neill's memoir, Woman in the Making, was launched at Pantibar on 31 October 2014 by former RTÉ newsreader Anne Doyle. O'Neill said the book, though covering the Pantigate controversy in its closing chapters, was primarily "about a change in Ireland and it's reflected through my story". In December 2014, High Heels in Low Places returned to Dublin for a week-long run at the Project Arts Centre.

=== Marriage equality referendum (2015) ===
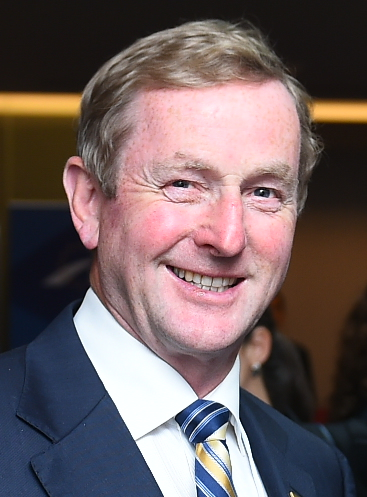
During the Marriage equality referendum, Taoiseach Enda Kenny visited Pantibar as part of the campaign

Panti became one of the most recognisable figures of the "Yes" campaign ahead of Ireland's 2015 marriage equality referendum, canvassing door to door in the months before the vote. Pantibar became a focal point for the campaign, and Taoiseach Enda Kenny visited during this period, a moment repoRTÉd as a symbol of how far the political mainstream had moved on the issue. Bliss said that a Taoiseach would not have visited a gay bar five years earlier, and that, although some in the gay community resented politicians seeking the "pink vote", Bliss welcomed their interest. Bliss described the referendum period as difficult, noting that the debate had made it acceptable, for a time, to say things about gay people in public that would not previously have been aired.

The referendum was held on 22 May 2015 and passed with 62% of the vote in favour, making Ireland the first country to legalise same-sex marriage by popular vote. Arriving at the count centre at Dublin Castle as the result was announced, Panti described it as "an amazing day to be Irish". A week after the vote, Bliss returned to Ballinrobe to perform a show in the town, an event covered in The Queen of Ireland.

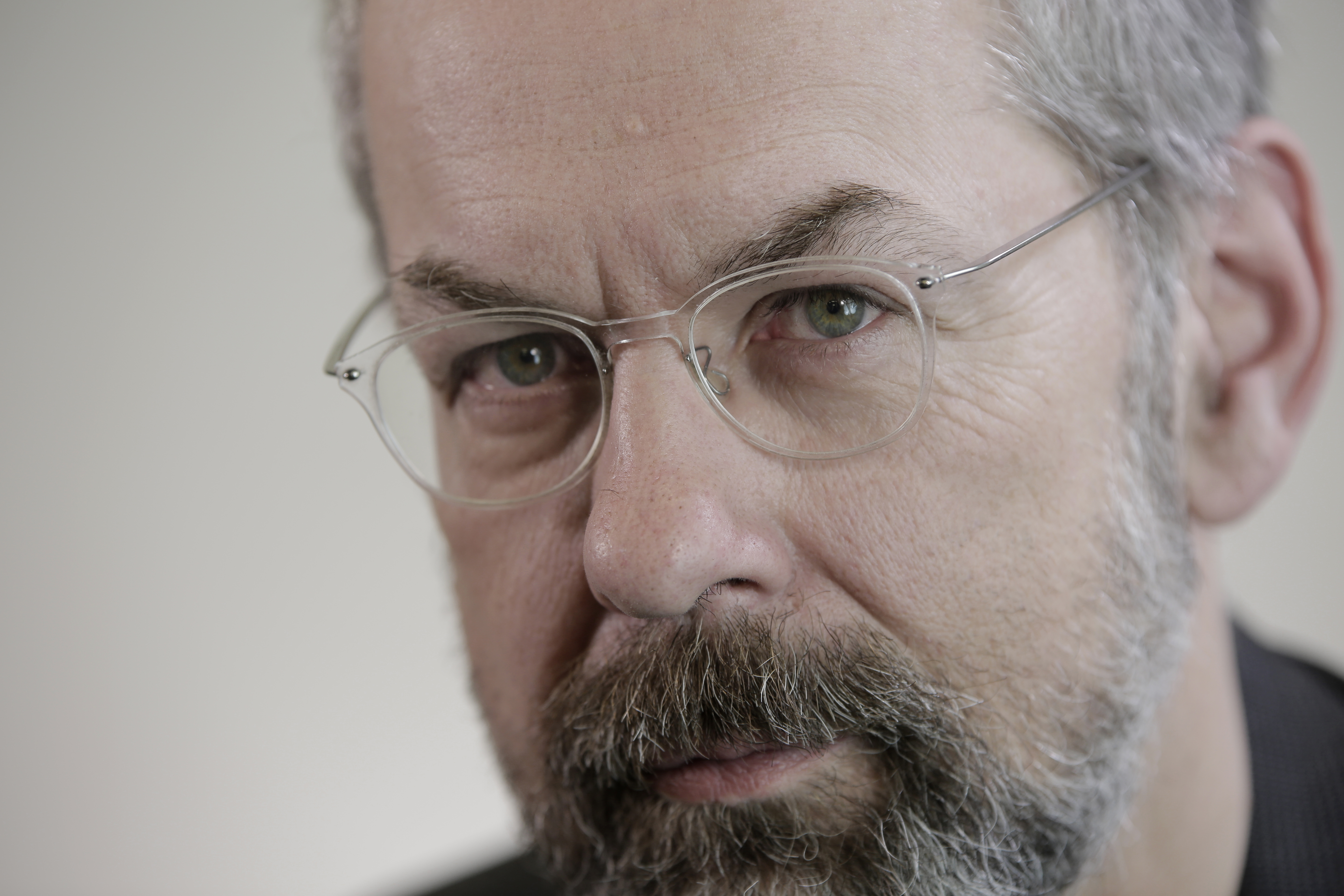
During 2014 and 2015, film maker Conor Horgan created the documentary The Queen of Ireland, which followed Bliss' activism in the period

The Queen of Ireland, a documentary directed by Conor Horgan that follows O'Neill and Panti through the events of 2014 and 2015, premiered on 21 October 2015 and was followed by a nationwide Irish release on 23 October 2015. O'Neill has described Panti's on-stage role as "a court jester, whose role is to say the un-sayable". In December 2015, Panti delivered a Christmas Day message on the Irish channel TV3.

=== Later activism (2016–2018) ===
In February 2016, while touring Australia, Panti appeared on the ABC current affairs programme Lateline to discuss growing up Catholic, homophobia and the marriage equality campaign.

In April 2016, Bliss turned the basement of Pantibar into a walk-in HIV testing centre, offering a 30-second test and on-site counselling in response to a sharp rise in HIV infections among young gay men in Ireland. The scheme, believed to be the first of its kind outside a clinical setting in Ireland, was intended to reach young gay men from outside Dublin who might otherwise be reluctant to approach a doctor.

Following the 2015 marriage equality result, Panti became a prominent supporter of the campaign to repeal the Eighth Amendment of the Constitution of Ireland, which restricted access to abortion, framing gay rights and reproductive rights as related questions of "bodily autonomy". Panti was among a number of Dublin drag performers who appeared in a September 2016 issue of GCN magazine dedicated to the repeal campaign.

In April 2017, High Heels in Low Places ended with a final run, titled "The Last Hurrah", which concluded at the Abbey Theatre on 30 April 2017. Panti was next scheduled to appear in Thisispopbaby's cabaret show Riot at Vicar Street in July 2017. In August 2018, O'Neill featured in an Irish Times piece on performers and their alter egos, discussing the relationship between Rory and Panti; O'Neill said, "Neither is a lie, they are just a different facet of the same person".

=== Television, the pandemic and later career (2019 onwards) ===
Exterior of Pantibar in 2023

In June 2019, Bliss donated the dress worn at the Noble Call speech to the National Museum of Ireland, where it forms part of a display on LGBTI+ history in Ireland, as part of the museum's Rainbow Revolution Trail initiative marking Pride. In an RTÉ interview, O'Neill said the honour sat uneasily alongside drag's traditionally anti-establishment character, while welcoming the wider recognition of queer history within Irish heritage institutions. In the same interview, O'Neill discussed the changing treatment of HIV since the 1995 diagnosis, moving from a regimen of 38 pills a day with significant side effects to a single daily tablet.

Later, Bliss took over the nearby Pennylane cocktail bar at 2 Great Strand Street in 2020. Pantibar and Pennylane were closed during COVID-19 lockdowns and reopened in June 2021 under public health restrictions. O'Neill spoke publicly during this period about the strain the closures placed on the hospitality and live entertainment industries, and performed at that year's Rock Against Homelessness fundraiser in aid of Focus Ireland. By May 2021, Bliss was also recording Panti Personals, a podcast of one-to-one conversations between Panti and guests.

In 2023, Panti took part in the sixth series of Dancing with the Stars, partnered with Ukrainian dancer Denys Samson, having first been announced as a contestant on 1 December 2022. Panti finished the competition in sixth place on 5 March 2023. In 2024, Bliss was Grand Marshal of the London St Patrick's Day Parade.

In January 2025, ahead of an Australian tour of the one-woman show If These Wigs Could Talk, Panti was interviewed by The Guardian, discussing subjects including the Iona Institute, favourite places and celebrity encounters. The tour ran in February 2025, with performances in Melbourne, Brunswick Heads and Sydney.

== Personal life ==
O'Neill is HIV-positive, having been diagnosed in 1995. O'Neill has spoken of the shame and stigma surrounding the diagnosis at the time, and of the marked improvement in treatment and life expectancy for people with HIV since the 1990s. O’Neill has said that, under treatment, the viral load remains undetectable, meaning the virus cannot be passed on, and that only a small number of public figures in Ireland are willing to discuss living with HIV openly.

In 2019, O'Neill married the Brazilian-born Anderson Cabrera. O'Neill lives in Dublin. O'Neill's father died in 2025.

== Views ==
Bliss's public commentary has centred on LGBTQ+ rights, though Bliss has also spoken on abortion rights, RTÉ's editorial conduct, and the Catholic Church's role in Irish public life

On homophobia, Bliss has argued that publicly campaigning for gay people to have fewer legal rights can reasonably be characterised as homophobic, a definition set out during the 2014 Abbey Theatre speech and defended repeatedly in subsequent interviews. In a February 2014 interview with Gay Community News, Bliss argued that editors and broadcasters should no longer treat equal treatment for gay people as a legitimate subject for debate, and urged Taoiseach Enda Kenny to introduce marriage equality by legislation rather than a referendum, leaving any opponent to bring a constitutional challenge. In a 2017 speech titled All the Little Things, repoRTÉd by Attitude, Panti described the risk calculations gay people make before showing affection in public, saying of Panti's own experience that "I have never once casually, comfortably, carelessly held hands with a partner in public".

Bliss has been sharply critical of RTÉ's handling of the Pantigate controversy, arguing that the broadcaster's legal response, rather than Bliss's original remarks, caused lasting damage to public debate on the issue. In February 2014, Bliss attributed the speed of the settlement to RTÉ's caution after the earlier Fr Reynolds affair. Bliss has separately named the Iona Institute as a long-standing opponent, citing its campaigning against both marriage equality and abortion rights in Ireland.

On marriage, Bliss said in 2009 that the proposed civil partnership legislation would be a welcome step for many couples but was also "enshrining discrimination" by creating a separate institution for gay people. On the format of the 2015 referendum, Bliss has expressed reservations about deciding minority rights by popular vote, stating "I don't think that the majority should get to vote on the rights of minorities", while also arguing that a referendum result, once secured, carries a social legitimacy that legislative change alone would not. Bliss has said this legitimacy was reflected in increased public confidence among gay couples in Ireland after May 2015. In December 2015, Bliss argued that the referendum had effects beyond marriage, giving gay people greater confidence and energising other equality campaigns, including the campaign to repeal the Eighth Amendment.

Bliss has voiced concern about political apathy among some younger LGBTQ+ people, contrasting the current generation with earlier activist cohorts and linking the trend to a loss of creativity within contemporary gay clubland. In 2009, Bliss similarly argued that, as gay culture moved into the mainstream, younger people had had less cause to question the world around them. Bliss has also expressed ambivalence about drag's move towards the cultural mainstream and about Panti's own acceptance by Irish institutions. In 2013, Bliss said the mainstream had "made a little room" for Panti rather than Panti having been mainstreamed, and in 2015 called it odd that Panti had become so establishment given drag's underground appeal. In November 2019, Bliss said that RuPaul's Drag Race had greatly increased the popularity of drag but that the form had become "anodyne" compared with the confrontational art form Bliss had entered. Bliss has also described discomfort at becoming "defanged and mainstreamed", and said that during the referendum campaign Bliss was sometimes asked to appear as Rory O'Neill rather than Panti, which Bliss understood but did not always agree with. On a related point, Bliss has criticised the "blandification" of gay culture internationally, attributing the decline of long-standing gay venues in cities such as London, Sydney and Montreal partly to gentrification and the internet.

Bliss supported the campaign to repeal the Eighth Amendment, which was repealed in 2018, describing gay rights and reproductive rights as connected questions of bodily autonomy. In early 2017, Bliss nevertheless cautioned campaigners that "It's very easy for passion to become anger", arguing that tone mattered if undecided voters were to be persuaded. Speaking in Australia in 2016, Bliss also supported LGBTQ+-inclusive school programmes such as Australia's Safe Schools initiative, arguing that children become aware of their own difference at a young age and that such programmes help counter bullying.

In June 2025, Bliss said that Bliss did not mind companies withdrawing from Pride parades, and that corporate floats had drained some of the fun from the events, but expressed concern for LGBTQ+ employees if companies abandoned their commitments to staff. Bliss has also called for a directly elected mayor of Dublin and more power for local councils, and has said, hypothetically, that their first act as Taoiseach would be the complete separation of church and state.

Reflecting on the decade since the 2015 referendum, Bliss told The Irish Times in May 2025 that Bliss no longer felt as safe in Dublin as before the vote, particularly when appearing as Panti, saying "the haters have been emboldened" and citing street abuse that would not have occurred ten years earlier.

== Works ==
=== Theatre ===
- 2005 Spurt! Sister! Spurt! as Madame
- 2007 In These Shoes?, Written and performed by Rory O'Neill as Panti, at the Dublin Gay Theatre Festival
- 2007 All Dolled Up, Written and performed by Rory O'Neill as Panti
- 2009 A Woman In Progress, Written and performed by Rory O'Neill as Panti
- 2014 High Heels in Low Places, Written and performed by Rory O'Neill as Panti.
- 2022 If These Wigs Could Talk, Written and performed by Rory O'Neill as Panti.

=== Media ===
==== Film ====
- 2015 The Queen of Ireland

==== Television ====
- 1990 Nighthawks as "Seán The Transvestite Farmer"
- 1998: The Maury Povich Show, as Panti (1 episode: "Turn My Daughter Back Into My Son")
- 2008: The Clinic as Dusty Mulberry (1 episode)
- 2008: Raw as Panti (1 episode)
- 2014: The Mario Rosenstock Christmas Special as Panti
- 2014: The Saturday Night Show
- 2015: The Queen of Ireland's Christmas Day Message, TV3
- 2022: The Late Late Eurosong Special as Panti (televote spokesperson)
- 2022: Bad Sisters, as Ms Sandy Mounts (1 episode)
- 2022–2024: Wreck, as Brian/Gloria Hole (6 episodes)
- 2023: Dancing with the Stars

==== Radio ====
- 2011: Ireland's Karaoke Klassics, 2FM, Co-presenter as Panti with Arveene
- 2014: Sunday Breakfast With Dee Reddy, Phantom FM as guest contributor
- 2016: Pantisocracy a RTÉ Radio 1 four part interview series hosted by Panti

==== Podcast ====
- 2021: Panti Personals, one-to-one conversations between Panti and guests

==== Music ====
- 2014: "Oppression" by Out!rage Featuring Panti Bliss released in aid of BeLonG To
- 2014: "The Best Gay Possible - Oppressive Dance Mix" by Pet Shop Boys incorporates Panti's speech at the Abbey Theatre

=== Book ===
- Woman in the Making: A memoir, Rory O'Neill, 2014, Hachette Books Ireland.

== Coverage and recognition ==
=== Documentary ===
O'Neill and alter ego Panti are the subject of a documentary about O'Neill's early life, the events surrounding comments O'Neill made about homophobia and Panti's role during Ireland's marriage equality campaign. Filmed over a number of years, the documentary was directed by Conor Horgan. The Queen of Ireland premiered on 21 October 2015, followed by its planned nationwide release in Ireland from 23 October 2015.

=== Awards ===
- Winner of 'Business Person of the Year' – Gay and Lesbian Awards 2009
- Winner of 'Best Blog Post' – Irish Blog Awards 2010
- Attitude's Editor's Special Award - Attitude Magazine Awards 2014
- Award for contribution to Irish society - People of the Year Awards 2014
- Gold Medal for Outstanding Contributions to Public Discourse - Presented by the College Historical Society of Trinity College Dublin in 2014
- Equality Award - Presented by European Law Students Association of Trinity College Dublin in 2014
- James Joyce Award - Presented by Literary and Historical society of University College Dublin
- Trinity College Dublin, Honorary Degree – O'Neill was awarded an honorary degree from Trinity College Dublin in 2015 for contributions to LGBT rights and marriage equality.
