= Mr Gay Ireland =

Gay male beauty contest

Mr Gay Ireland is an annual contest for gay men, with regional heats held in gay venues around Ireland, with a grand final held in late October. Founded in 2005 and originally called Mr Gay Dublin, previous finals have been held in The George, Dublin. The 2010 title holder, Max Krzyzanowski, went on to win the title of Mr Gay World 2009.

== History ==
Founded in 2005 and originally called Mr Gay Dublin, the event is organised by the Dublin Gay Theatre Festival. Mr Gay Ireland has become more than a beauty contest and has become a nationwide community civic and social project designed to overcome negative stereotypes of gay people and to encourage a civic and social action for HIV/AIDS amongst the contestants and their friends.

The contest has previously been hosted by Brendan Courtney, alongside Dolly Grip, one of the George's resident drag queens and cohost of Shirley Temple Bar's Sunday Night Bingo.

Mr Gay Ireland is run by a group of volunteers from the International Dublin Gay Theatre Festival. Since its inception, Mr Gay Ireland has donated almost €50,000 to charitable causes including Round Tower Housing Association (HIV/AIDS), St. James's Hospital Foundation (HIV/AIDS), BelongTo Youth Development, the KAL case and GCN.

== Participants ==
Entrants have been aged from 18 to 40, with several nationalities competing for the prize.

Mr Gay Ireland 2008, Barry Meegan, made the grand final in the Mr Gay International Competition in Hollywood in 2008. Both he and Mr Gay Northern Ireland represented Ireland in the Mr Gay Europe competition in Budapest in July 2008. Mr Gay Ireland 2007, John Rice, was 3rd in Budapest in 2007. Mikey Robinson, Mr Gay Northern Ireland 2007, made the top 8 in Budapest (2007), following Mr Gay Ireland 2006 Keith Kearney's second place in Mr Gay Europe in Amsterdam in 2006. The 2009 title holder went on to win Mr Gay World 2010.
