= 2010 Slamdance Film Festival =

- Location: Park City, Utah, U.S.
- Awards: Sparky Awards
- No. of films: 91
- Festival date: January 21–28, 2010
- Website: http://www.slamdance.com/

Slamdance Film Festival
- 2011 2009

The 2010 Slamdance Film Festival took place in Park City, Utah from January 21 to January 28, 2010. It was the 16th iteration of the Slamdance Film Festival, an alternative to the more mainstream Sundance Film Festival.

For the 2010 Festival, Slamdance received a record number of over 5,000 submissions and programmed 91 films and concluded with an Awards Ceremony at Red Banjo Pizza on Main Street.

New for 2010, a new distribution partnership with Microsoft was announced where four films that screened at the festival would go live on both Zune and Xbox LIVE platforms. Documentary Features “American Jihadist” and “Mind of the Demon: The Larry Linkogle Story,” and Narrative Features “The Scenesters” and “The Wild Hunt” will be available for a seven-day period for movie fans to rent though their computers or on Xbox LIVE until February 2, 2010.

== Awards ==
There are three competitive divisions at this year's festival, the Grand Jury, Audience Awards and Special Sponsored Awards provided by Kodak, Dos Equis and Lonely Seal Releasing. The Grand Jury and Audience Award winning films will be screened in several domestic venues throughout the year, including the IFC Center in New York City. The Feature competitions are limited to first-time filmmakers working with production budgets of $1 million or less.

Award name	Film title	Award Recipient
Grand Jury Award for Best Narrative Feature	Snow and Ashes	Charles-Olivier Michaud
Special Jury Honorable Mention for Narrative Feature	One Hundred Mornings	Conor Horgan
Grand Jury Award for Best Documentary Feature	American Jihadist	Mark Claywell
Grand Jury Award for Best Narrative Short	First Day of Peace	Mirko Rucnov
Grand Jury Award for Best Animated Short	Seed	Daniel Bird and Ben Richardson
Audience Award for Best Narrative Feature	The Wild Hunt	Alexandre Franchi
Audience Award for Best Documentary Feature	Mind of the Demon: The Larry Linkogle Story	Adam Barker
Kodak Vision Award for Best Cinematography	General Orders No. 9	Robert Persons
1st Annual Script Accessible Screenplay Award sponsored by Lonely Seal Releasing	All the Wrong Reasons	Gia Milani
Dos Equis Most Interesting Film Award (and best Mumblecore film to NOT play SXSW)	Nothing But Everything	Wallace Cotten
