= Four-minute mile (disambiguation) =

A four-minute mile is the completion of a mile run (1.6 km) in four minutes or less.

Four Minute Mile may also refer to:

- 4 Minute Mile, a 2014 American drama film
- Four Minute Mile, a 1997 album by American rock band The Get Up Kids
- The Four Minute Mile, a 1988 Australian miniseries
