= Ronald Bennett =

Ronald Bennett may refer to:

- Ronald Bennett (priest) (1935–2024), Irish Franciscan friar and sports master convicted of sexual assault against some of his pupils
- Ronald Bennett (athlete) (born 1984), Honduran athlete
