= Nico Archambault =

Canadian dancer and choreographer

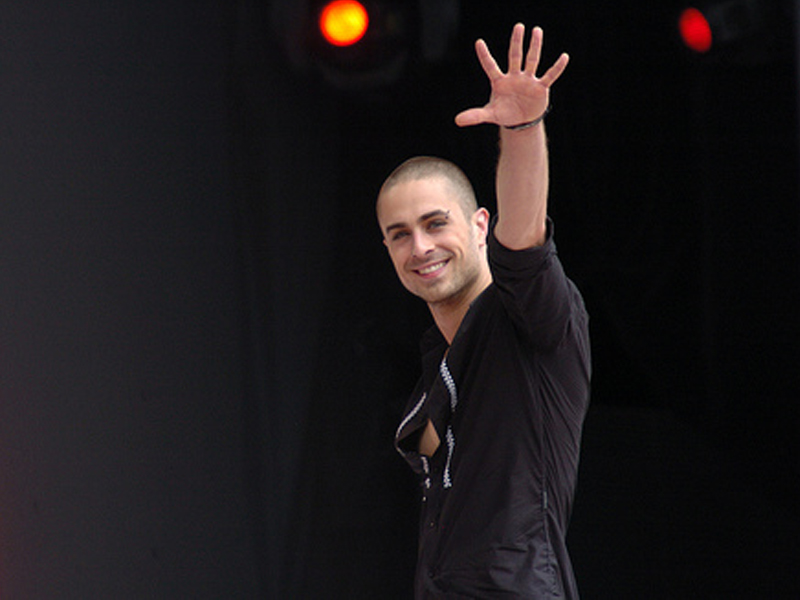
- Born: Nicolas Archambault; 18 October 1984 (age 41); Montreal, Quebec, Canada
- Occupations: Stage Director, Choreographer, Dancer, Actor
- Years active: 2008-

Nicolas "Nico" Archambault (born 18 October 1984) is a Canadian dancer and choreographer, who in 2008 won the first season of So You Think You Can Dance Canada. After the win, he became well known for his lead role in the 2011 Canadian film On the Beat (Sur le rythme).

== Beginnings ==
Born in Montreal, Quebec, Nicolas Archambault was the first of four children. He started dancing as a young seven-year-old, with a dance teacher Louise Lapierre, where all his sisters also learned dancing. He was traumatized for being ridiculed as the only male student in the class. While in Antoine-de-Saint-Exupéry Secondary School in Saint-Léonard, a suburb of Montreal, Quebec, he registered for dance classes and was taunted, intimidated and ostracized by the male students for being "gay". In addition to growing up too fast for his age, he also suffered from Osgood–Schlatter disease. His childhood suffering prompted him in his successful years to remain very active in fighting bullying in schools.

BY age 14, he was already involved in public performances and at 19 studied dance at LADMMI, the Montreal school of contemporary dance affiliated with Cégep du Vieux Montréal. While a student, he was offered a position as a freestyle dancer at the popular Quebec game show La Fureur where he worked for 5 years. During this period, he also took part in a number of musical shows including Elvis Story, in Night Fever, in Joe Dassin – La grande fête musicale and in a lyrical version of the rock opera Starmania. He was also an assistant to the choreographer Brian Friedman.

== So You Think You Can Dance Canada ==
In 2008, he took part in the first season of So You Think You Can Dance Canada in Toronto where 3500 contestants applied. Archambault soon became the favorite of the public, the judges and the choreographers of the show. He was the sole contestant not to be nominated to the "bottom two" position and without being put to the risk of elimination. He won the first title of the show at the end of nine weeks of competition, receiving $100,000 as a cash prize as well as a car. After his win, he was also offered the position of resident choreographer of the show.

== Career ==
Immediately after the show, he was offered the chance to dance with Janet Jackson during the 22 November 2009 American Music Awards and he took part as a principal dancer in the music video for Jackson's video "Make Me". The same year, he played the role of a young Russian dancer Rudolf Nureyev in the television film Nureyev on the Canadian Bravo! channel. The series obtained six nominations at the Gemini Awards, including one for Nico Archambault for "Best Performance in a Performing Arts Program or Series (Individual or Ensemble)".

Archambault works in the choreography company Street Parade, and is the artistic director in the electro-pop group The Pinup Saints, with his wife Wynn Holmes as lead vocalist. He also appeared in The Pinup Saints music videos for "Mister" and "Halo".

In 2010, he choreographed the musical comedy Le Blues d'la Métropole directed by Serge Denoncourt, honoring the band Beau Dommage Théâtre Saint-Denis in Montreal. He was also involved with Serge Denoncourt in a mission to Belgrade, Serbia to teach Romani adolescents modern dance. GRUBB The Musical emerged as an educational and artistic project for helping young gypsy artists through dance. The prepared work was presented at the Montreal International Jazz Festival.

Nico Archambault has landed with the lead role of Marc Painchaud in the 2011 Canadian film On the Beat (Sur le rythme), directed by Charles-Olivier Michaud.

== Danse avec les Stars ==
Nicolas was a judge during 8 before becoming a professional partner in 13 where he was partnered with the Canadian singer-songwriter Cœur de pirate.

| Season | Partner | Notability (known for) | Place | Average (/40) |
|---|---|---|---|---|
| 13 | Cœur de pirate | Singer-songwriter | 11th | 19.00 |

== Charity ==
Nico Archambault is involved with the Bullying Prevention Campaign because of him having suffered greatly in school. In agreement with TXT Carbon, he designed a T-shirt "Stand Up, Rise Up" for anti-bullying awareness with proceeds going to victims of bullying. The campaign was featured on the Canadian Family Channel. Archambault said he was labelled "gay" and experienced homophobia simply because he was a male dancer.

== Personal life ==
Nico Archambault married his longtime girlfriend and fellow dancer from Toronto, Wynn Holmes on 10 July 2010. The couple had been dating for three years and got engaged shortly after Archambault won in So You Think You Can Dance Canada in December 2008.

== Appearances ==
=== Director ===
- 2015: Young Galaxy, Falsework International Tour, Stage Director
- 2015: Loud Lary Adjust feat. Karim Ouellet "Automne" music video, Director
- 2015: Koriass "Zombies" music video, Director
- 2016: Cœur de pirate, Roses Tour, Stage Director
- 2016: Koriass "Blacklights" music video, Director
- 2016: Cœur de pirate, Carte Blanche Quebec City Summer Festival, Stage Director

=== Dancer ===
- 2003-2008: La Fureur, freestyle dancer
- 2006-2007: Night fever, Capitole de Québec
- 2008: So You Think You Can Dance Canada, winner of the first Canadian series
- 2009: American Music Awards, dancer for Janet Jackson
- 2009: Starmania, in a lyrical version
- 2015: Madonna, Grammy Awards
- 2015: Madonna, Brit Awards
- 2016: Saturday Night Fever, role of Tony Manero, Palais des Sports (Paris)

=== Choreographer ===
- 2009-2011: So You Think You Can Dance Canada, resident choreographer
- 2010: Le Blues d'la métropole, choreographer of the musical comedy
- 2011: Montreal International Jazz Festival, choreographer for GRUBB The Musical
- 2011: Mixmania 2, choreographer for Tant que l'on s'aime (The part of Emmy Langlais and Tommy Tremblay)
- 2014: "The Next Star Supergroup", choreographer for all groups
- 2014: Stagnant Pool, a short film by Kevin Calero, choreographer
- 2015: Skrillex, "Doompy Poomp" music video, choreographer
- 2015: Les Dieux de la Danse, Ici Radio-Canada Télé, choreographer 2 episodes
- 2015: Just Dance 2015, commercial, Ubisoft, choreographer
- 2015: Aldo Group + Farha Foundation, Ça Marche, A Parade to win against AIDS

=== Music videos ===
- 2008: "C'est chelou", a music video of Zaho
- 2008: "La Roue Tourne," a music video of Zaho
- 2009: "Je te promets", a music video of Zaho
- 2009: "Make Me", main dancer in Janet Jackson music video
- 2015: "Living for Love", Dancer in Madonna music video
- 2021: "L'habitude de mourir", a music video of La Bronze

== Filmography ==
- 2009-2011: So You Think You Can Dance Canada (season 2– 4), guest judge
- 2009: Nureyev, a television series about Rudolf Nureyev on the Bravo channel
- 2010: Vacation with Derek in role of Jesse
- 2011: On the Beat (Sur le rythme) in leading role as Marc Painchaud
- 2014: Stagnant Pool in the lead role as Narcissus
- 2014-2016: Quart de Vie, ICI tou.tv in the role of Beau (3 seasons)
- 2015-2018: Les Dieux de la Danse, Ici Radio-Canada Télé, resident judge
