= Migrants and Ethnic-minorities for Reproductive Justice =

Irish advocacy group

Migrants and Ethnic-minorities for Reproductive Justice (MERJ)
- Founded: 2017; 9 years ago
- Type: abortion access, anti-racism, grassroots activist group
- Location: Ireland
- Website: merjireland.org

Migrants and Ethnic Minorities for Reproductive Justice (MERJ) is an Irish grassroots advocacy organization that works on the issue of reproductive rights and reproductive justice among migrants, travellers as well as people of colour in Ireland. MERJ is a self-organised, non-hierarchical group of migrant women of colour whose engagement in abortion rights issues had always been central to Ireland. MERJ was founded in September, 2017. The group operates considering a wide intersectional framework, directly connecting the issue of reproductive justice and racial justice, migrant rights, housing rights, healthcare access, and its anti-direct provision. MERJ played a very critical role in the 2018 referendum campaign to repeal the 8th Amendment of the Irish Constitution and continues to advocate for full access to reproductive healthcare services for every citizen of the country regardless of migration status, ethnicity or disability.

== History ==
Migrants and Ethnic-minorities for Reproductive Justice (MERJ) was founded in 2017 as a voice for migrants, Travellers and people of colour affected by the restrictive access to abortion in Ireland as part of the wider Repeal the 8th campaign. In particular, some migrants in Ireland could not travel for abortion services in the United Kingdom or Europe before the Eighth Amendment was repealed.

== Core activities ==
MERJ campaign highlighting how migrant women, women of colour and from ethnic minorities are disproportionately affected by issues relating to maternal health, with 40% of maternal deaths in Ireland being migrant women in 2015. Since the repeal of the Eighth Amendment in 2018, MERJ now focus on how the current legislation on abortion services in Ireland continue to affect migrants and asylum seekers as well as campaigning against racism and direct provision. MERJ is organising events on and opening up conversations about abolitionist feminism and challenging white feminism in Ireland and beyond.

In June 2020, MERJ with Black Pride Ireland and Movement of Asylum Seekers in Ireland, were involved in organising Black Lives Matter protests and demonstrations in response to the murder of George Floyd.

== Principles and Vision ==
In May 2021, MERJ published a statement of its principles and vision on its website, presenting the principles to which it is committed. According to the statement, the advocacy organization adopts an intersectional feminist approach and advocates for reproductive justice in its broader sense; that it supports trans and non-binary people as well as sex workers; and, among other principles, that it seeks to amplify the voices of migrants and ethnic minorities, enabling them to represent themselves.
