= Seamus Martin (journalist) =

Irish newspaper editor (born 1942)

Seamus Martin (born 1942) is a journalist and the former international editor of The Irish Times. He was on the board of the Broadcasting Authority of Ireland, the state regulatory body for broadcasting in the Republic of Ireland.

== Early life and education ==
Seamus Martin is the brother and only sibling of Diarmuid Martin, the Roman Catholic Archbishop of Dublin. Born in Dublin, Seamus Martin was educated at Gormanston College in County Meath and the College of Commerce Rathmines, now part of the Dublin Institute of Technology. He studied economics at L'Ecole de la Chambre de Commerce et d'Industrie de Paris.

== Career ==
Martin was a sports commentator in his younger days in The Irish Press and the Irish Independent, sports editor of the Sunday Tribune and a columnist in the Evening Herald. Later he became features editor of The Irish Times, a columnist in that newspaper and afterwards a foreign correspondent.

As Moscow Correspondent of The Irish Times, he covered the collapse of communism and the dissolution of the Soviet Union. "What gave Martin's work its edge was his acute sense that what was occurring was no simple triumph of western values in an evil empire, but a complex difficult new phase in a nation's history. He brought to his analysis an Irishman's fatalistic sense that politics were both intensely personal and cruelly indifferent to the individual's fate. And he reported on what he saw with a keen awareness that of how the ending of socialism affected the daily lives of ordinary citizens, as emerging oligarchs seized immense wealth."

As South Africa correspondent, he covered the rise of Nelson Mandela, the dissolution of the apartheid and the arrival of democracy in South Africa. Later he became editor of the electronic editions of The Irish Times.

As a trades unionist, he has been a member of the London-based National Executive Council of the National Union of Journalists (NUJ), Cathaoirleach (chairperson) of the Irish Council of the NUJ and "Father" of the Irish Times Chapel of the NUJ.

His documentary series Death of an Empire on the fall of the Soviet Union and the rise of the New Russia won gold at the 2012 "New York Festivals World's Best Radio Programs" Awards. Other television documentaries include Martin's Moscow and Time on your hands in Latvia.

He continues to work occasionally as a freelance from Russia and elsewhere for The Sunday Business Post and the Irish Examiner as well as for The Irish Times.

He has written a novel, Duggan's Destiny (Poolbeg Press, 1997), and a memoir, Good Times and Bad: From the Coombe to the Kremlin, published by Mercier Press in 2008.

== Personal life ==
In retirement, he lives in Ireland and spends some months of the year in the Languedoc-Roussillon region of France where he has a house and vineyard.
