= The Wild Hunt (film) =

2009 film by Alexandre Franchi

- Directed by: Alexandre Franchi
- Written by: Alexandre Franchi; Mark A. Krupa
- Produced by: Alexandre Franchi; Karen Murphy
- Starring: Mark Antony Krupa; Ricky Mabe; Kaniehtiio Horn
- Cinematography: Claudine Sauvé
- Edited by: Stephen Philipson; Arthur Tarnowski
- Music by: Vincent Hänni; Gabriel Scotti
- Distributed by: TVA Films
- Release date: 9 April 2009
- Running time: 95 minutes
- Country: Canada
- Language: English
- Budget: $500,000 (CA$)

The Wild Hunt is a 2009 Canadian horror film written, produced, and directed by Alexandre Franchi and starring Mark Antony Krupa, Ricky Mabe, and Kaniehtiio Horn.

== Plot ==
Erik Magnusson and his girlfriend Evelyn have a falling out, in part due to stress from Erik's dying, incoherent father. She leaves to live in a live action role-playing game whose characters such as Celts, elves and Vikings are derived from the Middle Ages. Murtagh, the leader of a group within the game, wants Evelyn to participate in the Wild Hunt, a ritual that, if successful, will give his players a significant advantage in an upcoming mass battle.

Erik pursues Evelyn only to disrupt the game's proceedings. Erik partners with his estranged brother Bjorn and other players and referees on a quest to find Evelyn. He rescues her from the Wild Hunt and the two are reconciled, despite Murtagh's efforts to persuade her to come back.

Having lost Evelyn and been humiliated by Erik, Murtagh snaps and ritually cuts off his gamer wrist band. He leads his followers in a vicious assault on the main camp, injuring people and killing Erik. Murtagh flees, witnessing Evelyn commit suicide as he escapes through the woods.

Days later, Bjorn breaks into Murtagh's home and beats him to death.

== Cast ==
- Mark Antony Krupa – Bjorn Magnusson
- Ricky Mabe – Erik Magnusson
- Kaniehtiio Horn – Evelyn / Princess Evlynia
- Trevor Hayes – Shaman Murtagh
- Kent McQuaid – Greg'Ash
- Nicolas Wright – King Argyle
- Claudia Jurt – Tamara (referee)
- Kyle Gatehouse – David
- Spiro Malandrakis – Oliver (referee)
- Victor Andrés Trelles Turgeon – Miguel / The Mexican Viking
- Holly O'Brien – Princess Ambrosia
- Martin Stone – Magnus Gunnarsson
- Terry Simpson – Bernie / Captain BernHeart

== Production ==
The Wild Hunt is the first feature-length film by Montreal producer-director Alexandre Franchi. The production was based on 35mm film with an estimated $500,000 (CA$) budget.

== Release ==
The film was screened in September 2009 at the 2009 Toronto International Film Festival, where it won the award for Best Canadian First Feature Film. It was presented at the Slamdance Film Festival in January 2010 where it received an Audience Sparky Award for Best Narrative Film.

== Reception ==
National Post film reviewer Chris Knight rated the film at 3 stars, noting Claudia Jurt's role presented the "strongest link in this chain-mail tale". The Toronto Star review considered the film an "impressive achievement" but noted that technical flaws in editing, lighting and camera usage detracted from the plot and that the production should have been better funded. The Montreal Gazette gave a very positive review calling the low-budget film "[m]iraculously shot".

Along with the aforementioned wins at the 2009 Toronto International Film Festival and the 2010 Slamdance Film Festival, the film received three Genie Award nominations at the 31st Genie Awards. Patricia McNeil was nominated for Best Costume Design, Claudine Sauvé was nominated for Best Cinematography, and Hélène-Manon Poudrette was nominated for Best Makeup.
