= Capital Bars =

Irish leisure company

Capital Bars and Hotels plc
- Company type: Private
- Industry: Entertainment and Hospitality
- Founded: 1988
- Headquarters: Dublin Ireland
- Key people: William L.B. O'Dwyer, Desmond O'Dwyer, Joint Managing Directors
- Revenue: €36.1m (2004)
- Number of employees: ?
- Website: capitalbars.com

Capital Bars plc (formerly known as Break for the Border Group plc) was an Irish leisure company based in Dublin. Its core business was the acquisition, development and operation of bars, hotels and restaurants, all based in Dublin city centre. Brothers Desmond and Liam O'Dwyer control the company as Joint Managing Directors. After acquiring Capital Bars in 2001, the O’Dwyers took the company private the following year. The company was dissolved in 2017 following the sale of all its operational assets.

== History ==
The business originally began in O'Dwyers Bar and Lounge, in Mount Street Dublin 2. This small family run pub was extensively refurbished by elder brother Liam O'Dwyer in the early 1980s and became the first "victorian style" pub of which Dublin is so well known for now. This was also one of the first pubs in Dublin to sell "pub-grub" at lunch times.

The chain reached its peak in number of pubs in the early 2000s, with 11 pubs/nightclubs, one Planet Hollywood franchise and 3 hotels in 2001; but significant numbers of pubs were divested prior to 2009 including Bad Bobs for €12m in 2006. Poor financial performance was reported during the mid-00s.

The company entered mixed examinership/receivership on September 19, 2009; five days after poor results showing a 10m euro loss in the previous year. At that time the portfolio of multi-themed bars (several of them 'superpubs') included: Break for the Border, Café En Seine, Howl at the Moon, The Dragon, and The George, Dublin. All were situated in key locations in Dublin City Centre.

The O'Dwyers repurchased ownership of much of the section of the group put through receivership through their company Toji Holdings, with the other premises exiting examinership; however all properties have since been sold.

The "Zanzibar" pub was closed, and has since been sold for redevelopment as a hotel.

The Trinity Capital Hotel was sold in 2013 with the Grafton Capital Hotel sold in 2015, closing for refurbishment afterwards.

The remaining pubs - Café En Seine, The Dragon, The George and Howl at the Moon - were sold for a reported €15 million in late 2014 to rival pub and hotel operator Mercantile Group.
