= The Queen of Ireland =

- Directed by: Conor Horgan
- Written by: Conor Horgan; Phillip McMahon
- Produced by: Ailish Bracken; Katie Holly
- Cinematography: Kate McCullough
- Edited by: Mick Mahon
- Music by: Michael Fleming
- Production company: Blinder Films
- Distributed by: Universal Pictures
- Release date: 21 October 2015
- Running time: 86 minutes
- Country: Ireland
- Language: English

The Queen of Ireland is a 2015 Irish documentary film directed by Conor Horgan. It focuses on Rory O'Neill, better known as Panti, in the lead up to the historic referendum on marriage equality for same-sex couples in Ireland in 2015. When the film debuted in Ireland, it had the highest ever grossing opening weekend for an Irish documentary.

== Critical response ==
The film has been positively received, with Tara Brady of The Irish Times remarking that the "triumphant documentary deftly weaves through monumental moment of social history without losing sight of protagonist". Paul Whitington of The Irish Independent rated it 4 stars, while The Guardian also rated it 4 stars, writing that "Horgan’s film shapes up as a most pleasing portrait."
