= Veda Beaux Reves =

Irish singer and drag queen

Veda
- Other names: Enda McGrattan, Annmarie O'Connor
- Occupation(s): drag queen, musician
- Website: http://vedamusiconline.com/home.htm

Veda Beaux Reves, originally Veda Bon Reve, also known as Enda McGrattan, but better known simply as Veda, is a drag queen and singer from Dublin, Ireland.

== Career ==
Winner of the 1999 Alternative Miss Ireland competition, In 2002 she formed indie rock group Daddy's Little Princess who later went on to support Scissor Sisters on tour in 2004 . In 2006 Veda along with fellow drag artist Davina Devine formed electropop duo LadyFace. In 2010, Veda released her debut album Stars Edge which peaked in the top ten of the Irish charts. In summer 2010, Veda performed at Electric Picnic and headlined the Milk festival.

The Irish Times, in a positive review of the album Stars Edge, wrote, "It's cheeky, glam and often cheesy, but also a lot of fun". In a mixed review, The Sunday Business Post wrote, "Insubstantially frothy at all times, Stars Edge still packs enough of a glittery punch to hold the attention."

Veda released "Exhibit A" in May 2015. It is her first single to be taken from her third album. The single features musician and artists The Late David Turpin, who also stars in the music video alongside Veda's drag-daughter Angelinna Lovelace. The single was promoted with various performances in The George, Pantibar and Body & Soul 2015

Witchy Wednesday

Veda currently hosts a weekly drag show called Witchy Wednesday every Wednesday night at Dublin's best known gay bar, The George. The show features a mix of drag, comedy, music and cabaret performances. Veda is joined weekly by a number of established drag queens including Pixie Woo and Chanel.

== Discography ==
=== Studio albums ===
2009	Stars Edge: 1st Studio album; Released: 13 December 2009; Label: Anges Records; Formats: CD, Download
2012	Transphiban: 2nd Studio E.P; Released: 11 July 2012; Label: Anges Records; Formats: CD, Download
2015	Exhibit A: 3rd Studio E.P; Released: TBA; Label: Anges Records; Formats: CD, Download
