= Alternative Miss Ireland =

Annual gay event in Dublin, 1987–2012

Covers of Gay Community News showing AMI host Panti preparing for the contest. 2005 winner Miss Heidi Konnt is also featured.

The Alternative Miss Ireland (AMI) was an annual gay event which took place in Dublin, Ireland, on the Sunday closest to St. Patrick's Day, 17 March. It occurred over three-and-a-half hours and featured a pastiche of the beauty pageant rounds inspired by Andrew Logan's Alternative Miss World, with day-wear, swimwear and evening-wear rounds. It is commonly shortened to AMI, both as its initials and a wordplay on the French for "friend". It began in 1987 and ended in 2012.

The event promotional material states: "Alternative Miss Ireland (AMI) is an annual beauty pageant that is open to men, women and animals. It is also a non-profit collective dedicated to raising money for Irish HIV/AIDS organisations (over €235,000.00 raised since 1996)."

It featured on the front cover of the March issue of Gay Community News magazine each year and was the highlight of Ireland's calendar of gay-themed events. Coverage by mainstream news media was muted, possibly because it clashed with reporting of St. Patrick's Day, with occasional pieces in The Irish Times, and a documentary A Bit of the Other commissioned by RTÉ television.

== History ==
The first contest was held in Sides nightclub on Dame Street on 1 April 1987, followed by a hiatus until it began again in its present form during the mid-1990s. Upon recommencement, it was held in The Red Box, POD for the first few years. It switched to the Olympia Theatre in 2000 to accommodate its increasing popularity. It was a fund-raising event for HIV/AIDS charities such as Cáirde and St. James's Hospital. Although open to any entrant (a dog was once a contestant), it featured mainly gay-themed entrants and was commonly known as Gay Christmas since its host, Panti, used that term regularly in her opening routines.

It featured entries from heats around Ireland including Alternative Miss Cork, Alternative Miss Limerick, Alternative Miss Philippines (from a Filipino community in Ireland) and the rest of the approximately ten contestants entered directly.

In 1998, Miss Veda Beaux Reves, who had just lost first place to Miss Tampy Lilette, allegedly threw her Golden Briquette trophy at the judges in a tantrum. At the 2007 contest, the host Panti was surprised by a message from her hero Dolly Parton. It was traditional that the previous year's winner had a new performance after the interval, as Miss Heidi Konnt did in 2006.

There was a large production team involved, known as the Alternative Miss Ireland Family. It was reported in October 2011 that the final pageant would take place in 2012. One organiser said, "people have less time to pull everything together".

Critic Fintan Walsh has written about the contest in the article 'Homleysexuality and the 'Beauty' Pageant' (2009).

== Winners ==
- 1987 Miss Isle – Alternative Miss Ireland I
- 1996 Miss Tress – Alternative Miss Ireland II
- 1997 Miss Shirley Temple Bar – Alternative Miss Ireland III
- 1998 Miss Tampy Lilette – Alternative Miss Ireland IV
- 1999 Miss Veda Beaux Reves – Alternative Miss Ireland V
- 2000 Miss Siobhán Broadway – Alternative Miss Ireland VI
- 2001 Miss Tina Leggs Tantrum – Alternative Miss Ireland VII
- 2002 Miss Sid Viscous – Alternative Miss Ireland VIII
- 2003 Miss Alter Ego – Alternative Miss Ireland IX
- 2004 Miss Twirly Chassy – Alternative Miss Ireland X
- 2005 Miss Heidi Konnt – Alternative Miss Ireland XI
- 2006 Miss Funtime Gustavo – Alternative Miss Ireland XII
- 2007 Joanna Ryde – Alternative Miss Ireland XIII
- 2008 Sheila Fits-Patrick – Alternative Miss Ireland XIV
- 2009 Miss Smilin' Kanker – Alternative Miss Ireland XV
- 2010 Miss Peaches Queen – Alternative Miss Ireland XV
- 2011 Miss Mangina Jones – Alternative Miss Ireland XVII
- 2012 Miss Minnie Mélange – Alternative Miss Ireland XVIII

== List of past judges ==
- 1987 Judges: Twink, John Rocha
- 1996 Judges: Rita Crosbie, Brenda O'Donoghue, Nell McCafferty, Michelle Rocha, Ian Galvin, Mr Pussy, Agnes Bernelle
- Van Morrison
- Anna Nolan
- Louis Walsh
- Katherine Lynch
- Tonie Walsh
- Linda Martin
- Marc Almond
- Brendan Courtney
- Dorothy Cross
- Maria Doyle Kennedy
- Brenda Fricker
- Nell McCafferty
- Michelle Rocca
- Agnes Bernelle
- Senators David Norris and Ivana Bacik
- The Rubberbandits
- Bourgeois & Maurice

== Bibliography ==
- Walsh, Fintan (2009). 'Homleysexuality and the "Beauty" Pageant,' in Walsh and Brady, eds. Crossroads: Performance Studies and Irish Culture. Basingstoke and New York: Palgrave Macmillan.
