= On the Beat (2011 film) =

- Theatrical release poster
- French: Sur le rythme
- Directed by: Charles-Olivier Michaud
- Screenplay by: Caroline Héroux
- Produced by: Caroline Héroux; Christian Larouche
- Starring: Mylène Saint-Sauveur; Nico Archambault
- Cinematography: Jean-François Lord
- Music by: Mario Sévigny
- Release date: August 12, 2011
- Running time: 92 minutes
- Country: Canada
- Language: French
- Budget: $2 million
- Box office: $910,836

On the Beat (French: Sur le rythme) is a Canadian film by director Charles-Olivier Michaud, released on 10 August 2011. The lead actors are Nico Archambault in the role of Marco Polo Painchaud and Mylène Saint-Sauveur in the role of Delphine Lamarre. Many of the supporting cast of dancers were friends of Archambault. Sixty dancers from Montreal, Toronto, Calgary, and Vancouver took part in the film. The dances were designed by Archambault and his girlfriend/future wife Wynn Holmes.

== Plot ==
Sur le rythme is a romantic comedy about the world of dance. Delphine Lamarre (Mylène Saint-Sauveur), a 20-year-old student has to choose between medicine, her parents' (Paul Doucet and Marina Orsini) wish, and her dreams of a career in dancing.

== Cast ==
- Mylène Saint-Sauveur as Delphine Lamarre
- Nico Archambault as Marco Polo Painchaud
- France Castel as Dorothée "Mamie" Lamarre
- Paul Doucet as Denis Lamarre
- Marina Orsini as Marie Lamarre
- Géraldine Charbonneau as Sophie Painchauld
- Trevor Hayes as Billy Hollinger
- Lina Roessler as Sarah Greene
- Julien Hurteau as Félix
- Heather Peace as classmate of Sarah
- Robert Knowles as classmate of Sarah
- Jessica Lalitto as classmate of Sarah
- Jesse Robb as Chris
- Davy Boisvert as Spike
- Camille Vanasse as Johanne
- Alexia Gourd as Julianne Latulipe
- Shana Troy as Fiona
- Roxanne Mignacco as Annabelle Potvin
- Danny Amaral de Matos as Patrice Beaulieu
- Miles Faber as dancer in New York audition
- Handy Jacinthe as New York dancer
