= Snow and Ashes =

- Film poster
- Directed by: Charles-Olivier Michaud
- Written by: Charles-Olivier Michaud
- Produced by: Eric Mantion; David-Alexandre Coiteux; Charles-Olivier Michaud
- Starring: Rhys Coiro; David-Alexandre Coiteux; Lina Roessler; Frédéric Gilles; Jean Lapointe
- Cinematography: Jean-François Lord
- Edited by: Elisabeth Tremblay
- Release date: May 16, 2010
- Running time: 110 minutes
- Country: Canada
- Languages: English; Russian; French
- Budget: CAD$ 600,000

Snow and Ashes (French: Neige et cendres) is a 2010 Canadian drama film directed by Charles-Olivier Michaud. It follows the story of Blaise and David, two war correspondents covering an unnamed conflict in eastern Europe. It was awarded by the Jury Award for Best Narrative at the 2010 Slamdance Film Festival.

== Cast ==
- Rhys Coiro as Blaise Dumas
- David-Alexandre Coiteux as David Arnault
- Lina Roessler as Sophie St-Laurent
- Marina Eva as Patricia Aznii
- Gabriel Oszeciuk as Mishka Aznii
- Frédéric Gilles as Manu Poitier
- Natalie Chepurnyi as Stef Abelev
- Marianne Farley as Sana Abelev
- Alex Kudrytsky as Lt. Kaparov
- Jean Lapointe as Thomas Dumas

== Accolades ==
The film won the Jury Award for Best Narrative at the 2010 Slamdance Film Festival and won several other prizes, notably the prize for Best Foreign Language Film at the 2010 Mexico City International Film Festival and the Jury Award for Best Feature at the Sonoma Valley Film Festival.

Jean-François Lord won the Genie Award for Best Cinematography at the 32nd Genie Awards in 2012. The film also received nominations for Best Makeup (Tammy Lou Pate) and Best Visual Effects (Jacques Levesque, Eve Brunet, Philippe Roberge).
