= Black Pride Ireland =

Gay pride advocacy group

- Formation: 2019; 7 years ago
- Founder: Diana Bamimeke and Rayann A
- Type: Advocacy group
- Purpose: Advocating for the rights of black LGBTQIA+ people on the island of Ireland
- Location: Ireland
- Website: https://blackprideireland.ie

Black Pride Ireland is a Black gay pride advocacy group in Ireland founded in 2019 advocating for the rights of black LGBTQIA+ people on the island of Ireland.

== History ==
Black Pride Ireland was launched in August 2019 "by queer Black people, for Black LGBTQIA+ folks on the island of Ireland", with a manifesto which included a position against direct provision for asylum seekers in Ireland. In 2019, they marched as part of Galway Pride. Their manifesto outlines the group's focus on the rights of LGBTQIA+ migrants and refugees. It was inspired by UK Black Pride, and founded by Diana Bamimeke and Rayann A. The group was featured in Zithelo Bobby Mthombeni's 2020 film This Land.

In 2020, Black Pride Ireland have been involved in the organisation of Black Lives Matter protests and demonstrations in response to the murder of George Floyd alongside Movement of Asylum Seekers in Ireland and Migrants and Ethnic-minorities for Reproductive Justice in Galway, Dublin, Cork, Limerick, Sligo and Leitrim. These events have been criticised by Irish ministers and the head of the HSE as contravening COVID-19 movement and mass gathering restrictions. The Irish Writers Centre, Her.ie, and Stellar named Black Pride Ireland as one of the voices of black people and people of colour in Ireland to listen to.
