= Bourgeois & Maurice =

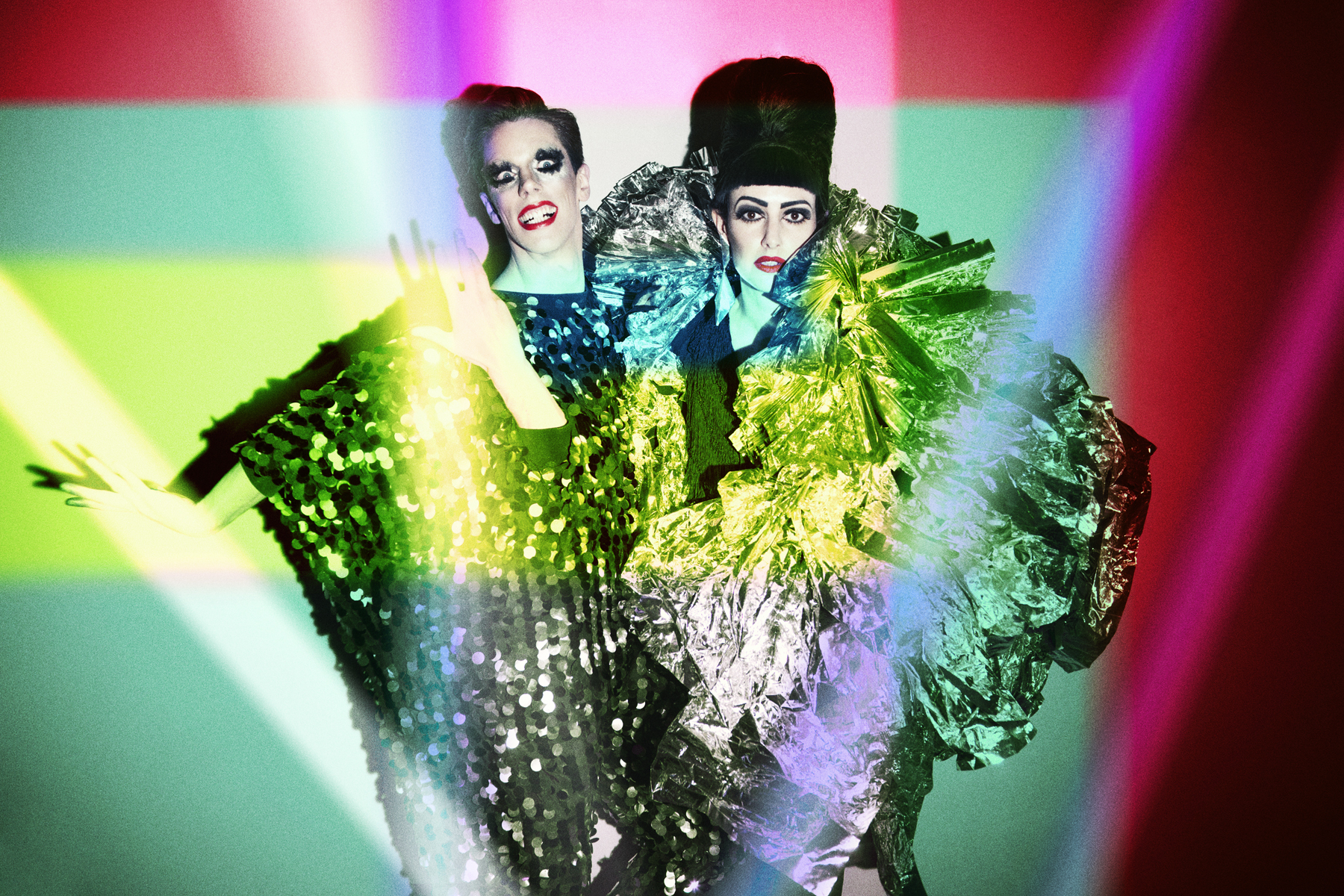
- Photo by Guto

Background information
- Genres: Cabaret, Comedy, Neo Cabaret, Satire
- Years active: 2007–present
- Label: Very Attractive Records
- Members: Liv Morris; George Heyworth
- Website: bourgeoisandmaurice.co.uk

Bourgeois & Maurice are a cabaret act based in London, described by Time Out London as 'neo cabaret'. The duo, formed in 2007, consists of Liv Morris and George Heyworth.

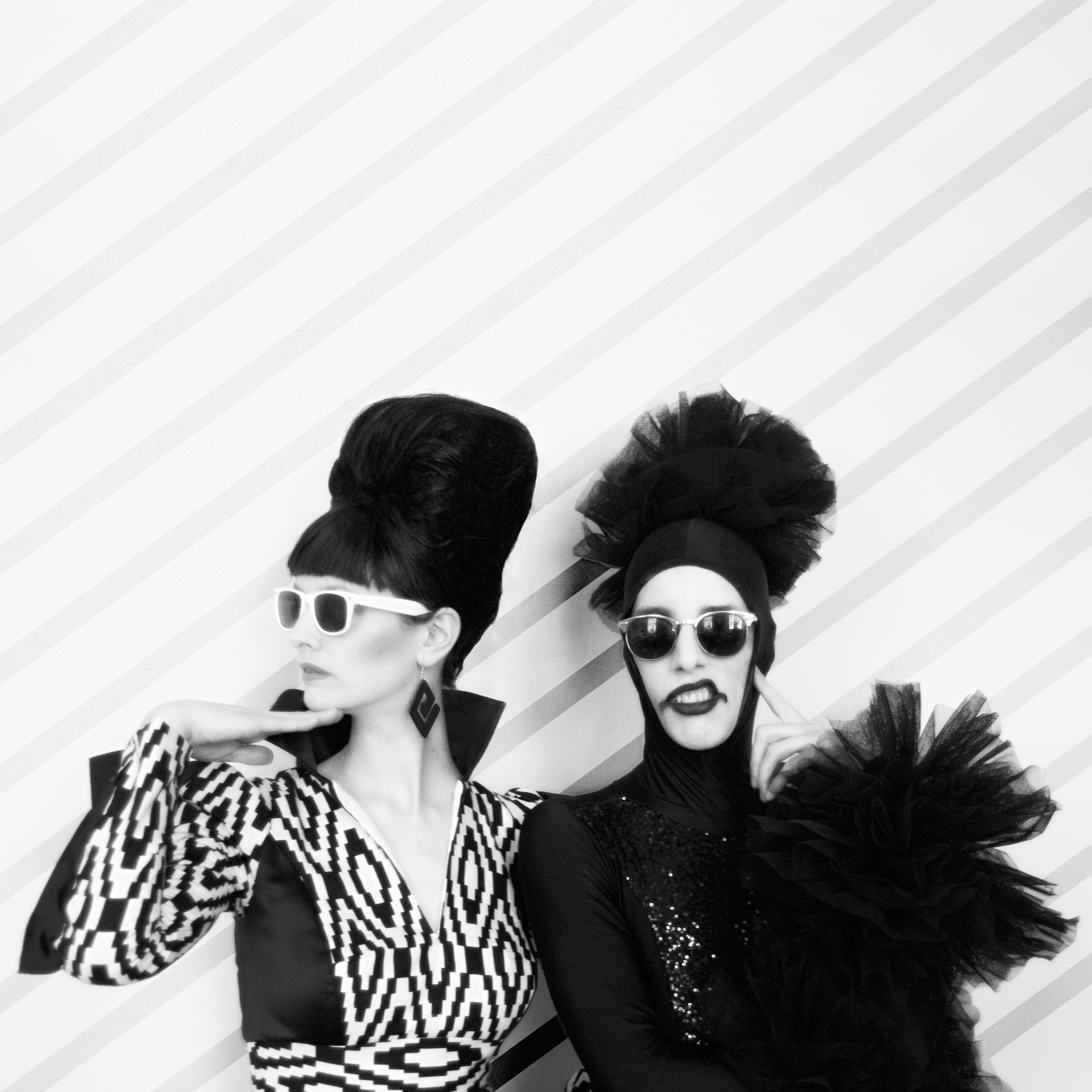
Alt cabaret duo Bourgeois & Maurice, photo: Tom Jef

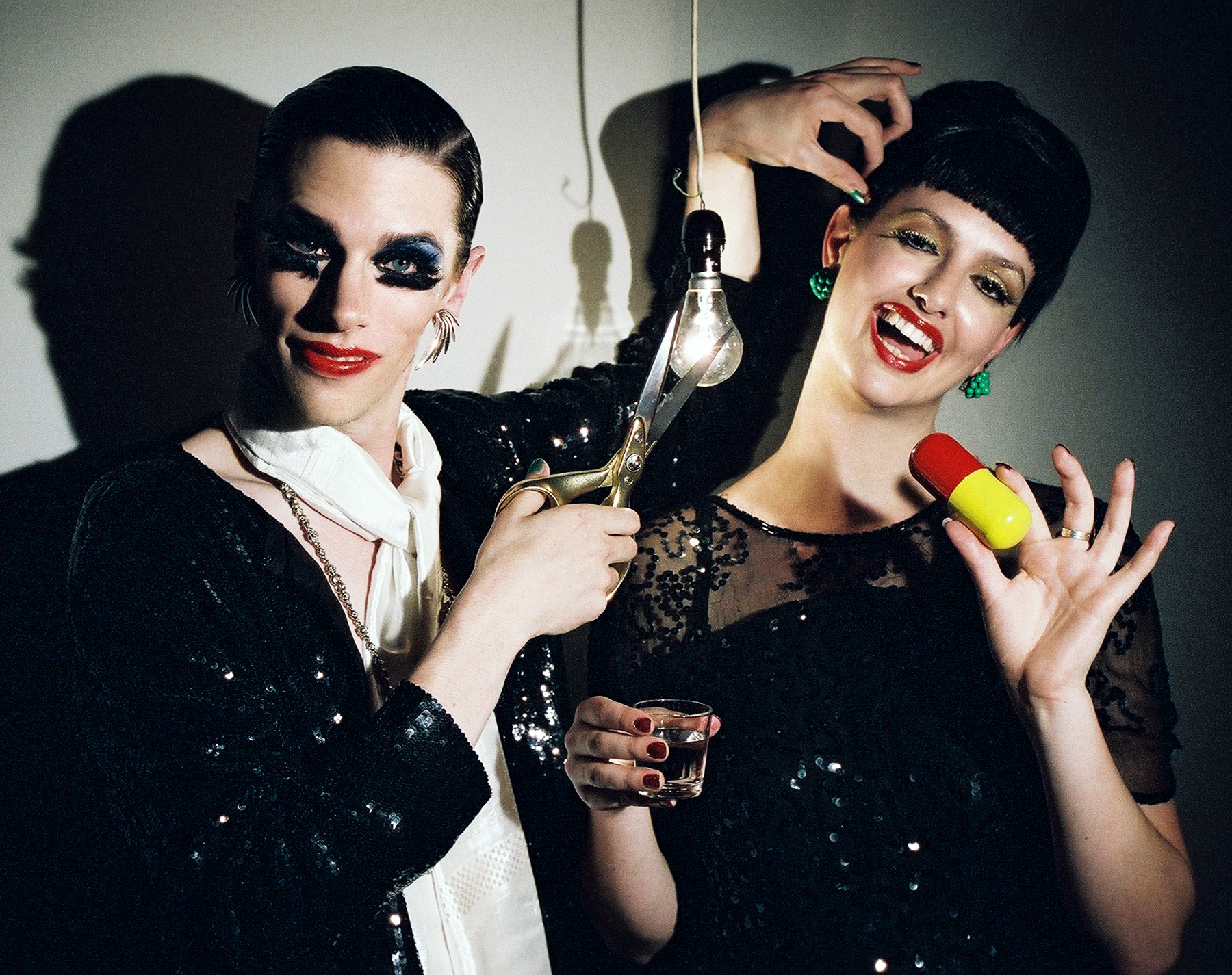
Bourgeois & Maurice

== Shows ==
Their first full-length show Social Work premiered at Soho Theatre in 2009 and subsequently toured the UK, winning an Argus Angel Award in Brighton. In August 2009 they took Social Work to Edinburgh Fringe Festival, receiving excellent reviews.

In 2010 they won Time Out London's Alternative Eurovision title. They failed to hold their title in 2011 but returned in 2014, representing Russia, where they once again won the Alternative Eurovision title with their song 'Goodbye Europe'.

Their next full show was Shedding Skin, which showed at Manchester's Queer Up North Festival and Soho Theatre in London during July 2010. Initially vague about the relationship to each other in early performances, the duo's second show, Shedding Skin, expanded on the characters' backstories, claiming that Georgeois Bourgeois and Maurice Maurice are siblings who killed their parents in a freak accident during the Great Storm of 1987.

This was followed quickly followed by Can't Dance at Sadler's Wells in Islington, London in December 2010. Can't Dance used video contributions from choreographers Lil' Tim and the BalletBoyz and performance artist David Hoyle.

The duo performed at the Glasgay! Festival in 2011. In December 2011 they released a parody of the John Lewis Christmas advert through Time Out.

Bourgeois & Maurice won the Best Music-Based Act title at the 2012 London Cabaret Awards.

August 2012 they returned to the Fringe with their new show Sugartits. Then toured with another show We Started A Band with two extra members on drums and guitar.

They toured Sugartits around the UK as well as playing Adelaide Cabaret Festival in the summer of 2013, followed by a two-week run at Soho Theatre in September.

In 2014 the duo announced they were working on a full length musical.

The duo were commissioned to produce their first full length musical Insane Animals which was performed at HOME in late February and early March 2020. The production completed its sold out run before theatres were closed due to Covid-19 restrictions. To celebrate Pride in 2020, the duo and the cast released "Gay for You" from the production on YouTube. Later in 2020 the duo and the cast came back together to record the soundtrack to Insane Animals which was released in March 2021.

== Music ==
The duo have released four studio albums: Musical Couture in March 2009, Shedding Skin in January 2011, The Third in March 2013 and How to Save the World Without Really Trying in 2017.

== Discography ==
=== Musical Couture – 2009 ===
1. "Cyber Lament"
2. "I Can't Live in London"
3. "Little Pins"
4. "What Would You Do?"
5. "Ritalin"
6. "Girls in Neon"
7. "Valerie"
8. "All The Boys"
9. "Don't Go To Art School"
10. "Addicted"
11. "Celebrity"
12. "Dull People"
13. "If You Don't Know What To Do With Your Life"
14. "Forget You"

=== Shedding Skin – 2010 ===
1. "C.H.A.O.S"
2. "As Far As I Can See"
3. "Retro"
4. "Maurice's Happy Song"
5. "The Lady Ballad"
6. "Satanic Organic"
7. "Lizard Men"
8. "Out Outfit You"
9. "Black Rope"
10. "Take Me Away"
11. "Life"

=== The Third – 2013 ===
1. "Started A Band"
2. "Apocalypso"
3. "C.H.A.O.S" (The Third Version)
4. "Tax Me"
5. "Goodbye Europe"
6. "Song for a Friend"
7. "We Want Love"
8. "Social Networks" (Make Me Feel Shit Sometimes)
9. "The Lizard Men" (The Third Version)
10. "Ritalin" (The Third Version)
11. "Privacy's For Paedos"
12. "Tolerance"
13. "Forget You" (The Third Version)
