= Conor Horgan =

Irish photographer, writer and filmmaker

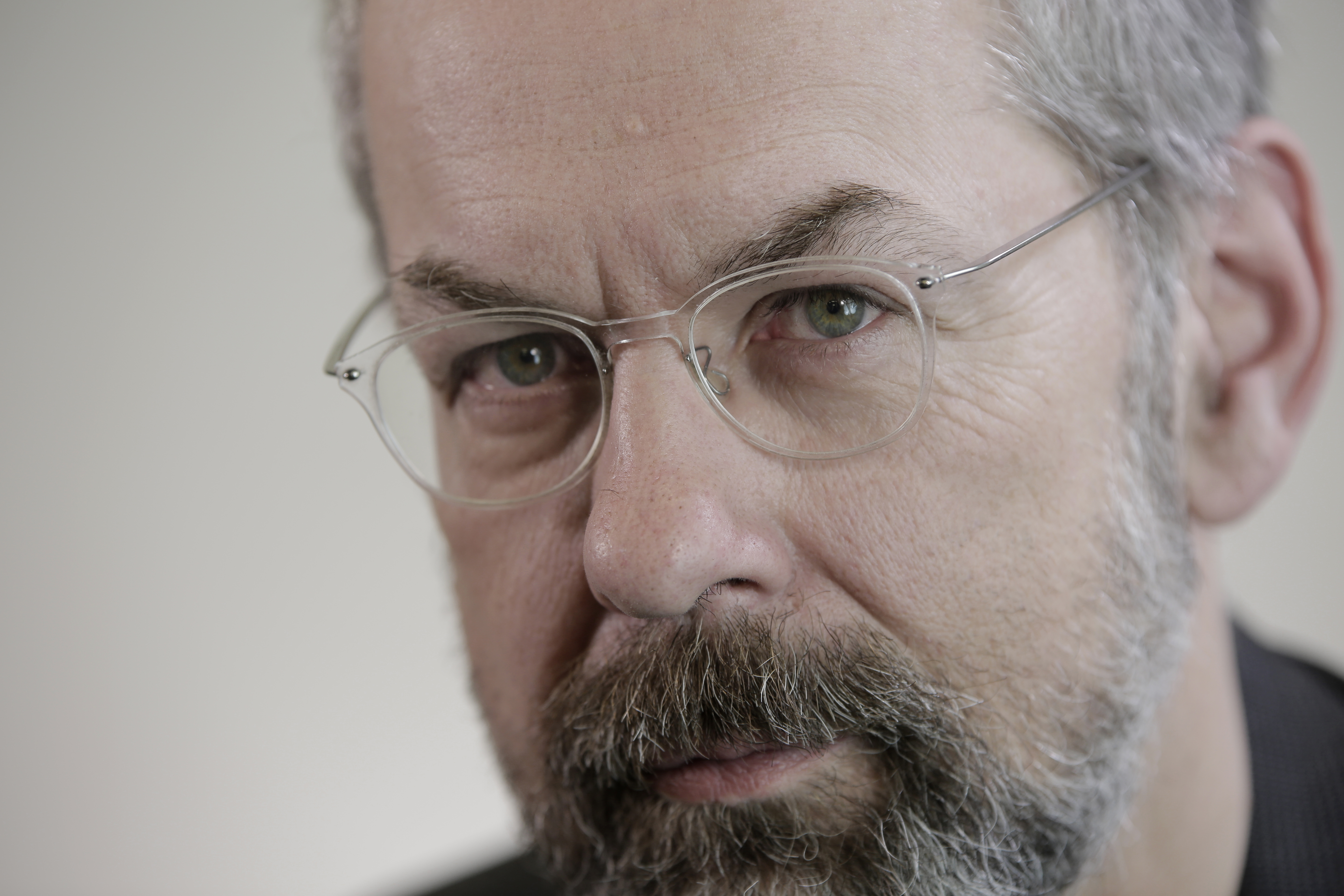
Conor Horgan in Mexico on 2017

Conor Horgan is an Irish photographer, writer and filmmaker.

== Career ==
Horgan first trained as a photographer, before moving into directing TV commercials. He directed over 70 commercials and won Best Director and Best Photographer at the Irish Advertising Awards. His first short film, The Last Time, starring Linda Bassett, received a nationwide cinema release in Ireland and was the recipient of the UIP Director Award and Best Irish Short at the Cork Film Festival.

Horgan's first feature film is One Hundred Mornings, which premiered at the Slamdance Film Festival in 2010, winning the Special Mention Award. One Hundred Mornings also won the Vortex Sci-Fi & Fantasy Award at the Rhode Island International Film Festival and the Writers Guild of Ireland Best Feature Film Script Award.

In 2015, his feature documentary The Queen of Ireland debuted in Ireland, breaking the record for an opening weekend for an Irish documentary.

When 15 Horgan was a puppeteer on the Irish children's program Wanderly Wagon. He left school at 16 and spent several years travelling around Europe, working in Greece and Morocco as a geo-electrical surveyor for the University of Hamburg's Institut für Geophysik.

== Visual arts practice ==
Horgan has a long-standing visual arts practice, including Post-State, a solo exhibition of photographs in the RHA Ashford Gallery. His work has also been shown in Highlanes Gallery and many others in Ireland and internationally. In April 2026 he was awarded the inaugural Taylor Wessing Irish Photo Prize for his project "EDGE".

== Filmography ==
=== Director ===
- The Queen of Ireland (2015)
- They Terrify Me (2014)
- Deep End Dance (2010)
- One Hundred Mornings (2009)
- About Beauty (2006)
- The Last Time (2002)

=== Screenwriter ===
- How To Be Happy (2013)
- Keys to the City (2012)
- One Hundred Mornings (2009)
- The Last Time (2002)
