= 4 Minute Mile =

2014 film by Charles-Olivier Michaud

- Directed by: Charles-Olivier Michaud
- Written by: Jeff Van Wie; Josh Campbell
- Starring: Kelly Blatz; Richard Jenkins; Cam Gigandet; Lio Tipton (Note: Credited as Analeigh Tipton; Tipton came out as non-binary and changed their name in 2021.); Rhys Coiro; Kim Basinger
- Cinematography: Jean-François Lord
- Edited by: Elisabeth Tremblay; Dirk Westervelt
- Music by: Stephen Barton
- Production companies: One Square Mile Management Company; Phoenix Rising Motion Pictures
- Distributed by: Gravitas Ventures
- Release date: June 5, 2014 (Seattle Film Festival)
- Running time: 96 minutes
- Country: United States
- Language: English

4 Minute Mile is a 2014 American drama film directed by Charles-Olivier Michaud, written by Jeff Van Wie and Josh Campbell, and starring Kelly Blatz, Richard Jenkins, Cam Gigandet, Lio Tipton, Rhys Coiro, and Kim Basinger. It is distributed by Gravitas Ventures, and the international sales rights are held by Double Dutch International.

The film premiered at the Seattle International Film Festival (SIFF) on June 5, 2014. Gravitas planned for a theatrical release on August 1, 2014.

== Plot ==
The movie begins with a boy asking his younger brother Drew to race his friends for a bet, and Drew wins. Later, they arrive home to find police taking their father away. 10 years later, Drew Jacobs is a member of his high school's track team, though finally leaves after altercations with another runner, Eric Whitehall. He has a strained relationship with his brother Wes and lives with his mother Claire too. Wes often asks Drew to run money over and pick drugs up by his local drug dealer, Eli. An old track coach, Coleman, who also is Drew's neighbor and a loner after his son died in a car accident, observes Drew run to and back from Eli's place, and is impressed with his speed, five-minute mile pace. He decides to start training Drew, who almost gives up after crazy challenges. Drew continues running his brother's drug errands, though Eli threatens them both because Wes is too afraid to show his face when he owes Eli money. Drew also begins catching feelings for his friend Lisa, also on the track team, who expresses her sadness in not being able to attend a UC Berkeley art program that she was accepted into due to financial problems. Drew wants to win a track meet and break the four-minute mile and get a scholarship so he can go there too. After a while of training, Drew discovers that Coleman is training him for the mile whereas he was hoping to run in the 400 meter event. In a deal, Drew races against Eric in the 400, however loses and decides to enter in for the mile. He trains and observes the current state champion, Charles St. James, hoping to beat him in the mile at Regionals. Coleman tells him to focus on running and battling himself rather than St. James, to which Drew agrees to. He finally enters into a relationship with Lisa. However, in the race, he gets second place and lashes out at Coleman and Lisa. Problems at home escalate when Eli violently attacks Wes, spilling blood at their home after stabbing him. Their mother finds out about Wes' drug dealing and as their yelling increases, Drew slips out and runs, finally beating and facing the fear that always held him back. He reconciles with Coleman and Lisa and his training and technique improves. However, one day, Eli shows up at their home with a gun and Wes confronts him armed as well. Observing from his window, Coleman calls the police but brings a baseball bat with him to stop the fight. Instead, he is accidentally shot by Wes, who is later arrested, but Coleman dies. Broken, Drew is in an unstable state until Coleman's funeral, where he realizes that he should break the four-minute mile for both himself and Coleman. Many friends, family, and teachers gather at the docks to watch Drew run, and the scenes also compare his style with St. James, who is running at the same time at the state meet. St. James attempts to beat his current record but makes a 4:02 mile while Drew breaks the four-minute mile at a 3:57. The film ends as St. James runs for UCLA and Drew for UC Berkeley, as they run in an NCAA championship.

== Cast ==
- Kelly Blatz as Drew Jacobs, teen track runner
- Richard Jenkins as Coach James Coleman, Drew's reclusive neighbor
- Kim Basinger as Claire Jacobs, Drew's mother
- Cam Gigandet as Wes Jacobs, Drew's older brother
- Lio Tipton as Lisa, Drew's girlfriend
- Rhys Coiro as Eli, drug dealer

== See also ==
- List of films about the sport of athletics
