= Gormanston College =

Catholic secondary school in County Meath, Ireland

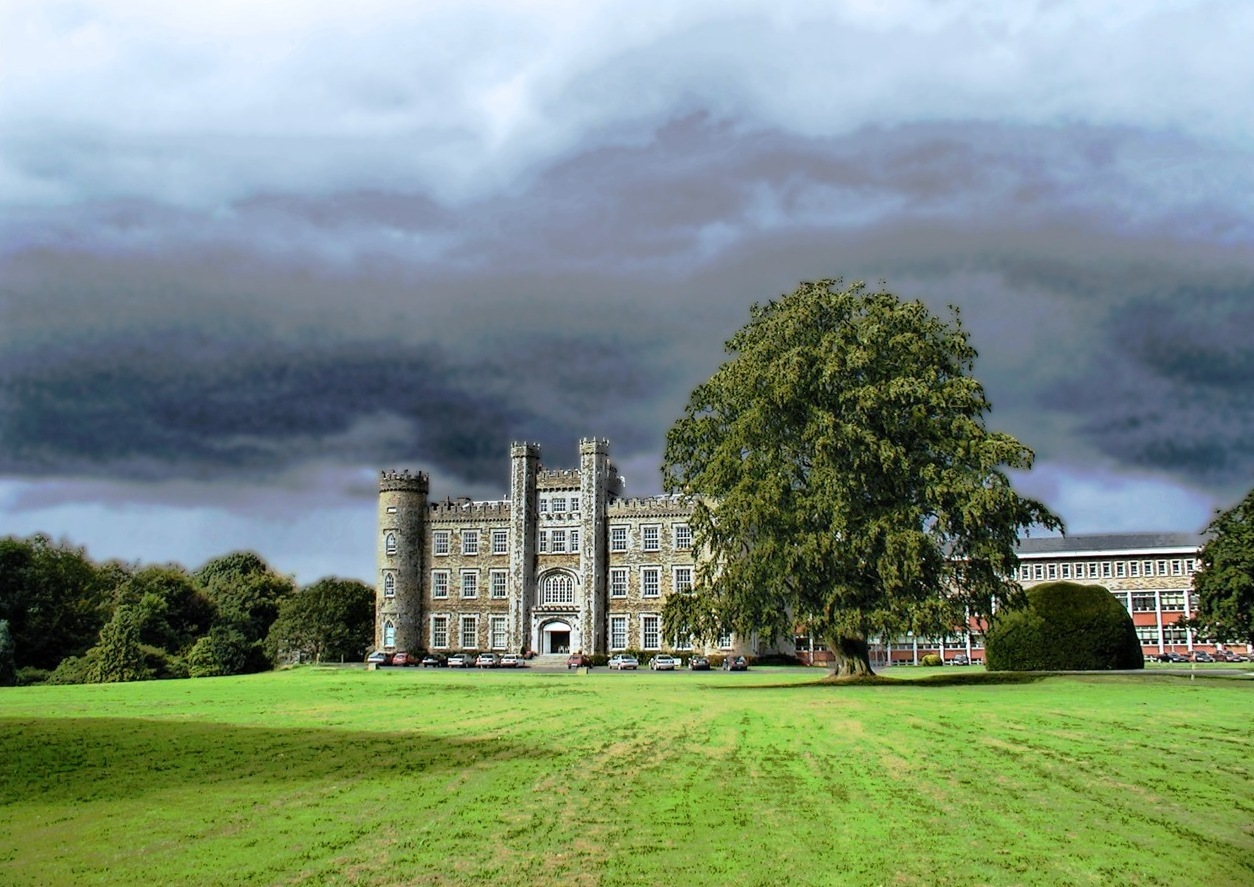
Gormanston College

Franciscan College Gormanston is a coeducational Catholic secondary school located at Gormanston Castle (built 1789), near Gormanston, County Meath in Ireland. It is located close to the county border with County Dublin and is approximately 32 kilometres (20 mi) north of Dublin. The college is managed by the Irish province of the Order of the Friars Minor. It operates under the trusteeship of the Minister Provincial and Definitory of the Franciscan Province of Ireland.

In September 2014, the school moved from being a fee-charging school to the free school scheme.

As of 2018–2019, there were 434 students enrolled in the school (288 boys and 146 girls). As of 2025, there were 349 students.

== History ==
=== Origins ===
Gormanston College has its immediate roots in the Seraphic College opened at Capranica, approximately 50 km north of the city of Rome in 1883. Originally intended as a training college for aspirants to the Franciscan Order, it was decided to transfer the college to Multyfarnham Abbey, County Westmeath in 1896 where it developed into a secondary school. The new college, dedicated to St. Louis, was opened in 1899. By the 1940s, the order deemed that the size and location of Multyfarnham was no longer adequate.

The order had purchased the Gormanston Estate in 1947 and its proximity to Dublin made it an accessible location for a modern college. The first boarding students were received in 1954 and the new college was opened in 1957. The first students graduated from the college in 1957, a number of whom returned to become rectors at the college, Pat McSweeney OFM, Bob Doyle OFM, Paddy "Paddy" Timothy OFM.

Prior to the establishment of the school, Gormanston Castle and demesne had been in the possession of the Preston family who have been Viscounts Gormanston since the 14th century.

=== Sex abuse offences ===
In July 2006, Father Ronald Bennett, a former spiritual adviser, sports master and bursar of the college, pleaded guilty to the indecent assault of three boarders and one day pupil between 1974 and 1981. He was initially given to a five-year suspended sentence. On appeal the sentence was increased to 2½ years imprisonment and 2½ years suspended.

During the court hearings, it emerged that the college authorities had been informed of the allegations at the time but despite promises to take action to prevent a recurrence of the abuse they had done nothing. This was confirmed by a former pupil in a letter to the Irish Independent in March 2007.

At the celebrations of the diamond jubilee of the school on 23 October 2014, the Minister Provincial of the Franciscans in Ireland, Hugh McKenna, said during mass that the order must acknowledge the 'shameful reality' that they had failed those students abused by Ronald Bennett. McKenna said that, "On behalf of the Franciscan Order I want to apologise unreservedly to each and every survivor for the pain and harm inflicted on those who suffered abuse while under the care of the friars". McKenna also apologised "for the breach of trust and the suffering victims and their families endured", noting that "no apology of mine can ever be sufficient [..] I acknowledge with deep shame that the Franciscan Order failed you".

=== Developments ===
In 2014, the school elected to enter the Free Education scheme, previous to that they had been a fee paying school. Fees are still charged for boarders.

== Sport ==
A golf course, a six-lane 400 metre race track, an indoor sports complex with four multipurpose sports courts, a 25-yard indoor swimming pool and other sports facilities are in the college. The school takes part in sports such as GAA, soccer, rugby, tennis, badminton, and sailing.

== Other uses ==
During the school holidays, the college plays host to the Irish beekeepers' summer school and the Stageworks Ireland Drama summer school.

== Notable alumni ==
- Mark Donegan, cricketer
- Frank Evers, athlete and businessman
- Colin Farrell, actor
- Jim Fitzpatrick, artist
- Jamie Hagan, rugby player
- J. J. Lee, historian
- Seamus Martin, journalist, author, broadcaster
- John Meyler, footballer and hurler
- Charlie McCreevy, Fianna Fáil politician
- Niall O'Dowd, US publisher and journalist
- James Reilly, Fine Gael politician
- Fergal Reilly, film director and voice actor
- William Slattery OFM, former Archbishop of Pretoria
- Matthew Sweeney, poet
- Michael White, judge
- Denis 'Ogie' Moran, former Kerry Gaelic footballer and manager

== See also ==
- Education in the Republic of Ireland
