= Dublin Gay Theatre Festival =

Annual theatrical event held in Dublin, Ireland

- Genre: Theatre festival
- Dates: First two weeks of May
- Locations: Dublin, Ireland
- Years active: 2004–present
- Founded: 2004; 22 years ago
- Website: gaytheatre.ie

The International Dublin Gay Theatre Festival is a theatrical event held annually in Dublin, Republic of Ireland, during the first two weeks of May. Over 50% of the festival's content comes from outside Ireland. The Festival has included productions from countries as diverse as Poland, Germany, Zimbabwe, France, Spain, Australia, South Africa, Venezuela and Canada as well as strong representation from the UK, Ireland and the United States. Festival 2016 saw the 3,500th performance of a Festival production since 2004.

== History ==
The festival was founded in 2004, in order to mark the 150th anniversary of the birth of Dublin-born Oscar Wilde in his native city, and to encourage and develop concepts of gay theatre. The image of Oscar Wilde was first used as the official festival logo in 2006 and remains so today. This image is combined with that of the green carnation, which is a gay symbol associated with both Oscar Wilde and homosexuality within the world of theatre.

The festival's patrons are Senator David Norris, writer Emma Donoghue and playwright Terrence McNally.

The festival has continued to grow year on year and has been sponsored by various organisations including The Arts Council, Dublin City Council, Visit Dublin and The George.

According to its official website, the International Dublin Gay Theatre Festival provides "theatrical and academic fora for the presentation of new and exciting works by gay authors, or works that have a gay character, theme, relevance or other input by a gay artist to promote visibility and recognition of gay people's contribution to the arts nationally and internationally."

== Venues ==
The festival is held in many venues across Dublin City Centre, including Outhouse Dublin, The Teacher's Club, The Players Theatre at Trinity College and The Ireland Institute, Pearse Street.

== Festivals ==
The 2017 incarnation of the festival took place from 1 to 14 May 2017. The 2018 festival took place from 7 to 20 May, and the 2019 festival from 5 to 19 May 2019.
