= The George, Dublin =

Gay bar and nightclub in Dublin, Ireland

The George
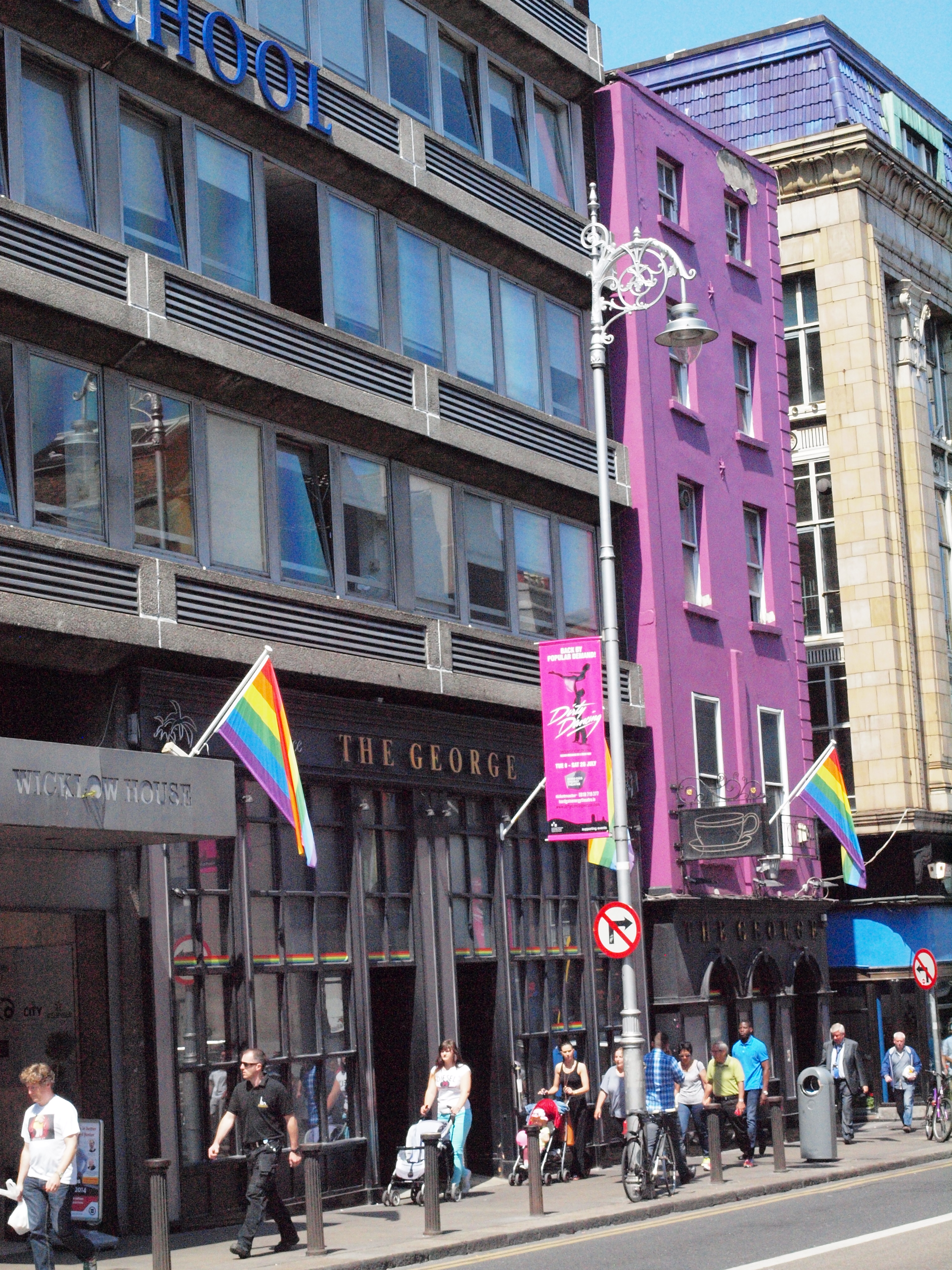

General information
- Location: George's Street, Dublin, Ireland
- Coordinates: 53.343747°N 6.264655°W
- Opened: May 1985; 41 years ago

Website
- thegeorge.ie

The George is a LGBTQ bar and nightclub on South Great George's Street in the city centre of Dublin, Ireland.

It is one of Ireland's oldest and biggest gay bars and is regarded as the best known gay bar in Ireland. South Great George's Street has historically been a popular location for gay men in Dublin.

== History ==
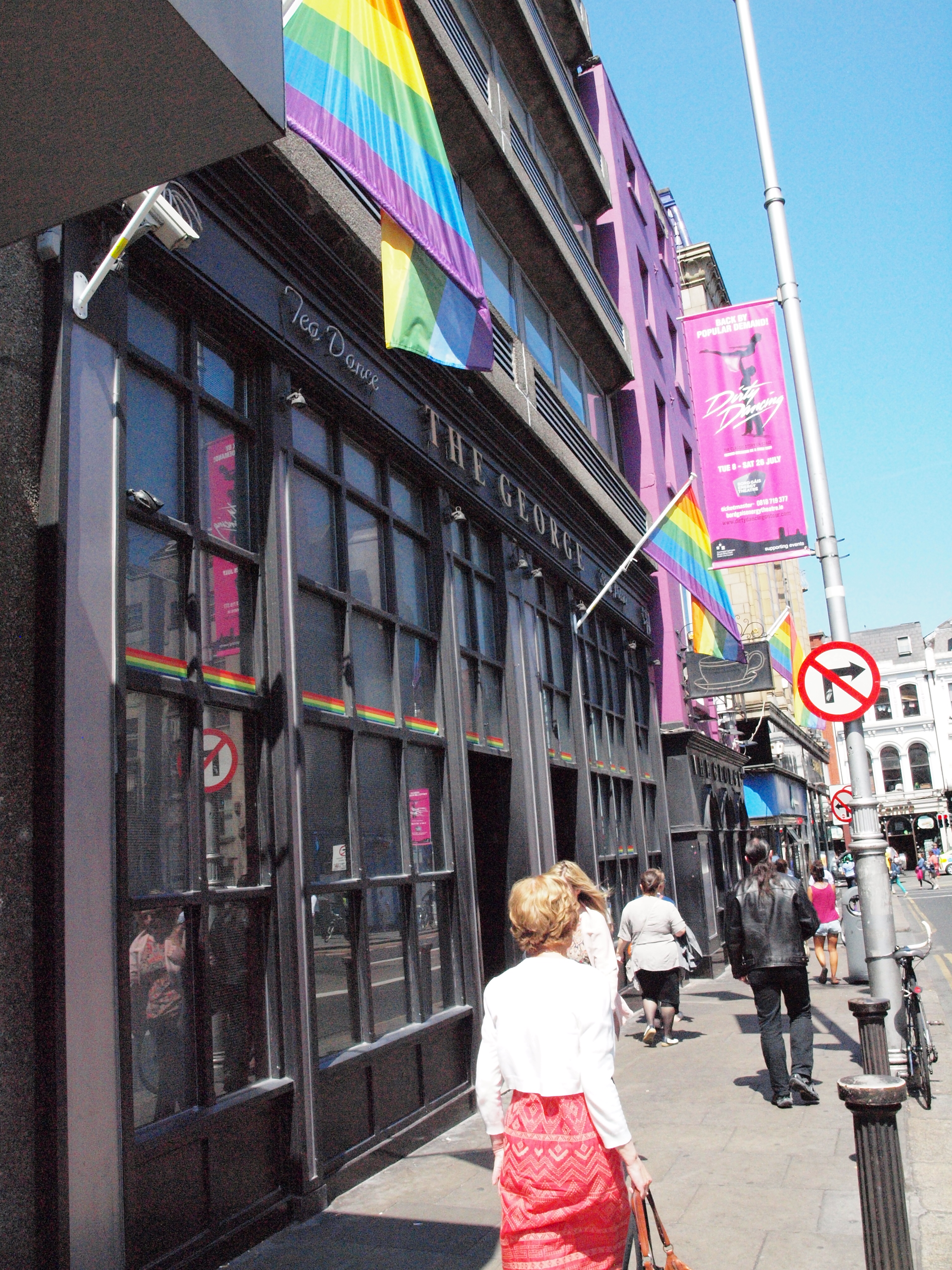
The George, Dublin

Opened in 1985, The George began as a gay-owned venture, eight years before homosexuality was legalised in Ireland. It was subsequently purchased by the group of bars and clubs owned by the Capital Bars Group and today it is owned by the Mercantile Entertainment Group who own several venues around the city including the popular music venue, Whelans.

Originally a traditional pub on the corner of George's Street, The George was purchased by Cyril O'Brien who loved the atmosphere of the bar but wasn't quite so sure about the décor and thought the place could do with a revamp. In 1984 the area above the pub was transformed into a gay disco bar called 'The Loft', with the downstairs pub remaining as a straight venue. In May 1985 the venue expanded downstairs to the area now known as 'Bridie's Bar', at which point the overall venue became known as The George. Eventually, The George became a dedicated gay bar.

It was only the second bar in the city to be owned by a gay proprietor and to be opened specifically as a gay bar; the other was 'The Viking' on Dame Street. Prior to this point, the city had multiple 'gay friendly' bars, however these venues did not openly trade as gay bars or advertise for LGBTQ clientele.

The George provided a safe space where gay people could socialise with their friends without fear and prejudice. Through the years, the bar continued to grow in popularity and post decriminalisation in 1993 there was an explosion of numbers onto the gay scene and for the first time The George expanded. In 1998, The George extended again into the building next door, which had originally been an Indian restaurant.

For many years it was the only large gay venue in the city, however the improved economy and liberalisation of Irish attitudes to homosexuality in the 1990s resulted in a diversification of the Dublin gay scene. This somewhat reduced the club's prominence, although it is still a central fixture of gay nightlife in the city. It retains an iconic status in spite of competition from newer gay venues, such as Pantibar on Capel Street and formerly The Dragon, also on South Great George's Street and The Front Lounge on Parliament Street, with both closing as gay venues since 2015, and The Front Lounge having new management and being renamed Street 66 which continues to be a safe space for the community.

The original and smallest part of The George, referred to as 'Bridie's Bar', is a quiet bar frequented by an older crowd. Next door, the club venue extends over two floors and regularly stages popular drag shows as well as personal appearances by Irish and international acts. It is also home to some of Ireland's best-known drag queens such as Shirley Temple Bar, Veda Beaux Reves, Davina Devine, Mizza, and Dolly Grip, drag king Phil T. Gorgeous, as well as a host of other drag acts. The venue boasts a drag act 'almost' every night apart from Fridays when the crowd are entertained by gogo-style dancers. The drag shows are "Win, Lose or Drag!" on Mondays, "The Dolly Grip Experience" on Tuesdays, "Witchy Wednesday" on Wednesdays, "Thirsty Thursday" on Thursdays, "Saturgay Karaoke" on Saturdays, & "Bingo with Shirley Temple Bar" on Sundays.

In June 2008, on the evening of the Dublin's LGBTQ Pride festival, a hoax caller said he planted a bomb at the venue. The Gardaí evacuated the venue at 11pm until the all clear was given 90 minutes later. The festivities then resumed to normal.

In September 2000, a 17-year-old student was raped in the ladies' toilets at the George on her first night in Dublin.

In May 2017, the pub was vandalised with swastikas and homophobic slurs.

== See also ==
- List of LGBTQ bars
- List of pubs in Dublin
