= Charles-Olivier Michaud =

Canadian writer, director and producer

- Born: November 11, 1979 (age 46); Quebec City, Quebec
- Occupations: Director, writer, producer
- Known for: 4 Minute Mile, On the Beat (Sur le rythme), Snow and Ashes

Charles-Olivier Michaud is a Canadian writer, director and producer from Saint-Romuald, Quebec. He has worked in English and French language films. His directing credits include 4 Minute Mile, On the Beat (Sur le rythme) and Snow and Ashes.

== Filmography ==
- 2010 - Snow and Ashes - writer, director, producer
- 2011 - On the Beat (Sur le rythme) - director
- 2012 - Exile (Exil) - director
- 2014 - 4 Minute Mile - director
- 2015 - Anna - writer, director
- 2023 - Ru - director
