= Ronald Bennett (priest) =

Irish priest (1935–2024)

Ronald Bennett, OFM (1935 – February 2024) was an Irish Franciscan friar and a spiritual director, sports master and bursar of Gormanston College, County Meath, Ireland, who was convicted of sexual assault against some of his pupils. His faculties for hearing confession and celebrating mass publicly have been withdrawn. Bennett lived at Dún Mhuire, Killiney, County Dublin. Bennett died in February 2024, at the age of 88.

== Conviction ==
Bennett joined the staff of the college in 1963 and his duties also included organising teams of altar boys. He pleaded guilty at Dublin Circuit Criminal Court on 29 June 2006, to six sample charges of sexually abusing four pupils, three of whom were boarders, at the college on dates from 1974 to 1981.

The abuse began with Bennett touching them outside their clothing, culminating with the abuse taking place in some cases with both parties totally naked. Some of the abuse took place in Bennett's office, while conducting sex education lessons, to which victims were summoned over the college tannoy system and direct access to which was controlled by a set of red and green lights outside his office door (a standard feature of all offices in the college at the time)

The Irish Times reported that the Franciscans in charge of Gormanston College during Bennett's tenure were made aware of abuse but did not remove him.

Richard Lanigan, a past pupil of Gormanston College, said the priest's behaviour was common knowledge among the boys in the 1970s, although they were not aware of the extent of the abuse. "Some of the priests were lovely men, dedicated to their students," he said, "but this went on and adults who should have known better didn't want to go there. The neglect of these children by the other priests is every bit as bad as what Bennett did to them." Lanigan has set up a website to provide an independent forum for former students to discuss how abused past pupils might be supported.

== Punishment ==
Bennett received a five-year suspended sentence on 26 July 2006 and entered into a bond of €1,000 to keep the peace for five years and undertake to abide by the Franciscan code of practice. On 5 March 2008 The Court of Criminal Appeal increased the sentence to 2½ years imprisonment and 2½ years suspended.

== See also ==
- Roman Catholic Church sex abuse scandal
- Roman Catholic priests accused of sex offenses
- Ferns Report, on sexual abuse in the Roman Catholic Diocese of Ferns, Ireland
- Crimen sollicitationis
- Pontifical Secret
