= Declan Buckley =

Irish drag queen

- Other name: Shirley Temple Bar
- Education: Marketing
- Alma mater: Dublin City University
- Occupation: Television personality
- Known for: Telly Bingo

Declan Buckley is an Irish television personality and drag queen from Dublin, Ireland, going by the persona Shirley Temple Bar. This name is a play on the name of the American child actress Shirley Temple and a cultural area of Dublin city called Temple Bar. He also writes a weekly column in national newspaper, The Star on Sunday. He has a business degree from Dublin City University. He featured on several documentaries for Irish and British television, an Irish language programme by broadcaster TG4 was nominated for an Irish Film and Television Award in 2003.

A 1997 winner of the Alternative Miss Ireland competition which helped launch his career, Buckley hosts a weekly bingo and drag show in Dublin's gay bar, The George.

In 2001, he caused a stir when his character Shirley Temple Bar took over the presentation of the National Lottery game show, Telly Bingo, on television. In 2004, Buckley began to present the show as himself.
