= List of Irish Supreme Court cases =

This is a partial list of cases decided by the Supreme Court of Ireland, the highest court in the Republic of Ireland. The list is organized chronologically within areas of law.

== Constitutional ==
Case name	Citation	Summary
State (Burke) v Lennon	[1940] IR 135	Imprisonment without trial; habeas corpus
Sinn Féin Funds case (Buckley and Others v the Attorney-General and Another)	[1950] IR 67	Separation of powers and right to property
McGee v The Attorney General	[1974] IR 284, [1973] IESC 2	Right to privacy in marital affairs; ability to import contraceptives
Norris v Attorney General	[1983] IESC 3, [1984] IR 36	Decriminalization of homosexuality
Crotty v An Taoiseach	[1987] IESC 4	Ratification of the Single European Act and external state sovereignty
Attorney General v X	[1992] IESC 1; [1992] 1 IR 1	Termination of pregnancy where there is risk to the mother including suicide.
In re Article 26 and the Regulation of Information (Services outside the State for Termination of Pregnancies) Bill 1995	[1995] IESC 9, [1995] 1 IR 1	Natural law supersedes positive law.
O'C(P) v DPP (2000)	3 IR 87; 2000 IESC 58	Examined the conditions under which a substantial delay can be ruled to result in an unfair trial.
De Roiste v Minister for Defence	[2001] 1 IR 190; [2001] IESC 4; [2001] 2 ILRM 241	The Court held that the extended delay (three decades in this case) in bringing forward an action was grounds for dismissal of the action.
Ardagh v Maguire	[2002] IESC 21; [2002] 1 IR 385	The Court ruled that the holding of an inquiry concerning the case of a fatal shooting of a member of An Garda Síochána by the Houses of the Oireachtas was an ultra vires act.
Dunne v Donohoe	[2002] IESC 35, [2002] 2 IR 533	Possession and security arrangements of firearms
P.M. v District Judge Miriam Malone and the Director of Public Prosecutions	[2002] IESC 46	Barred prosecution of an individual due to an inordinate delay.
The Health (amendment) (No. 2) Bill 2004	[2005] IESC 7	The right of a person to recover property can determine the constitutionality of a bill
Dekra Eireann Teo v Minister of Environment	[2003] 2 IR 270; [2003] 2 ILRM 210; [2003] IESC 25	A key feature of both European law and court rules is the policy of urgency.
Kelly v Trinity College Dublin	[2007] IESC 61	Former employments or associations are insufficient to disqualify a person from participating in disciplinary or similar tribunals related to that former employment.
Roche v Roche	[2009] IESC 82	Frozen embryos are not considered "unborn" in the context of the Constitution of Ireland.
Meadows v Minister for Justice, Equality and Law Reform	[2010] IESC 3; [2010] 2 IR 701; [2011] 2 ILRM 157	The proportionality test should be used when reviewing administrative actions that implicate fundamental rights protected by both the Irish Constitution and the European Convention on Human Rights.
Damache v DPP	[2012] IESC 11; [2012] 13 ILRM 153; [2012] 2 IR 266	The Supreme Court held that any search warrant issued by a person who is associated with the investigation was invalid.
Benedict McGowan and Others v Labour Court and Others	[2013] 2 ILRM 276; [2013] IESC 21; [2013] 3 IR 718	Provisions of Part III of the Industrial Relations Act are invalid considering the provisions of Article 15.2.1 of the Constitution of Ireland.
John Gilligan v Ireland & Others	[2013] IESC 45; [2013] 2 IR 745; [2014] ILRM 153	Section 13 of the Criminal Law Act 1976 allows judges to apply the principle of proportionality in sentencing.
Roche (also known as Dumbrell) v Governor of Cloverhill Prison	[2014] IESC 53	The Court decided that the Bail Act of 1997 is not a code that explains all the rules about the law on bail.
Vincent Sweeney v Governor of Loughlan House Open Centre and Others	[2014] 2 ILRM 401; [2014] IESC 42; [2014] 2 IR 732	A sentence being served in the administering state must be of the same legal nature as imposed in the sentencing state.
Bederev v Ireland	[2016] IESC 34; [2016] 3 IR 1; [2016] 2 ILRM 340	A government decision to expand the list of controlled drugs did not infringe on the authority of the Oireachtas
O'Farrell and Others v Governor of Portlaoise Prison	[2016] IESC 37	Identified a problem in the way the Irish prison system carried out prison sentences handed down by courts in other countries.
O'Connell & anor v The Turf Club	[2015] IESC 57; [2017] 2 IR 43	Organizational body of a sport is subject to judicial review even if the body was not created by statute.
B S v The Director of Public Prosecutions	[2017] IESCDET 134	The Supreme Court “is no longer a Court for the correction of error but rather a Court which has the principal constitutional task of determining issues of general importance.”
Grace and anor v An Bórd Pleanála & ors	[2017] IESC 10	Clarified the criteria for standing (sufficient connection to support participation in a case) in relation to judicial review of environmental concerns.
Hickey v McGowan & ors	[2017] IESC 6	
Damache v Minister for Justice	[2021] IESC 6	Clarified revocation of citizenship was not an aspect of the judicial power constitutionally reserved to the judicial branch, but an executive power
Heneghan v Minister for Housing, Planning and Local Government & Ors	[2023] IESC 7	Confirmed the Seventh Amendment of the Constitution mandated the Oireachtas to expand the franchise for Seanad elections

== Criminal ==
Case name	Citation	Summary
Melling v O'Mathghamhna	, [1962] IR 1	Restated Elements of a Criminal Offence
Attorney General v Oldridge	[2000] IESC 29; [2000] 4 IR 593	Establishing a corresponding offense for extradition; definition of fraud
Murphy v GM	, [2001] IESC 82	Affirmed the constitutional validity of the Irish Criminal Assets Bureau (See also Gilligan v Criminal Assets Bureau )
Blood v DPP	[2005] IESC 8	Confirmed that a right to an expeditious trial is implied in the right to a fair trial under Irish law.
DPP v Cronin (No. 2)	[2006] IESC 9; [2006] 4 IR 329	An "error or oversight of substance" must exhibited before a court would permit a new point to be raised on appeal.
A v Governor of Arbour Hill Prison	[2006] IESC 45	A finding that criminal legislation is unconstitutional need not render existing convictions void.
McFarlane v Director of Public Prosecutions	[2008] IESC 7; [2008] 4 IR 117	The right to a fair trial does not preclude prosecution in cases of prosecutorial delay unless the accused can demonstrate specific prejudice or that the delay was outside the norm.
Brian Rattigan v DPP	[2008] IESC 34	A criminal trial would be prohibited where prosecutorial delay or adverse pre-trial publicity created a substantial risk of unfairness to the accused.
McNulty v DPP	[2009] IESC 12; [2009] 3 IR 572	The Supreme Court upheld the decisions of the lower courts and decided that the question of Judicial Review was not to be dealt with by the Supreme Court.
DPP v McLoughlin	[2009] IESC 65	The admissibility of hearsay evidence for bail applications
Minister for Justice, Equality and Law Reform v Dolny	[2009] IESC 48	The court found that a European extradition can be applied if the offense is very similar to an offense in Irish law.
Minister for Justice, Equality and Law Reform v Stafford	[2009] IESC 83	A warrant which is based on circumstantial evidence can be enforced even if the participation of the defendant is only suspected to have taken place in the crime.
Minister for Justice, Equality and Law Reform v Murphy	[2010] IESC 17	Expanded the meaning of "detention order"
Director of Public Prosecutions v Pat Hegarty	[2011] IESC 32	Officers/key employees involved in anti-competitive practices may be prosecuted for their involvement, regardless of whether the undertaking itself has been prosecuted.
Minister for Justice Equality and Law Reform v Bailey	[2012] IESC 16	Clarified the grounds under which a person could be extradited for a European Arrest Warrant.
Callan v Ireland & The Attorney General	[2013] IESC 35; [2013] IR 267; [2013] ILRM 257	Clarified the relationship between commutation and a sentence of imprisonment in the context of an appeal for early release.
Roche (Also Known as Dumbrell) v Governor of Cloverhill Prison	[2014] IESC 53	The Court held that the Bail Act 1997 is not a code providing an exhaustive statement regarding the law on bail.
DPP v Peter Cullen	[2014] IESC 7, [2014] 3 IR 30	Addressed the routine practice of the Garda Síochána of placing handcuffs after an arrest for drink driving.
Thomas Murphy v Ireland and Others	[2014] IESC 19; [2014] 1 ILRM 457; [2014] 1 IR 198	The Director of Public Prosecutions failing to provide reasons for the issuing of a certificate under Section 42(6) of the Offences against the State Act 1939 was not repugnant to the Constitution.
O'Farrell v Governor of Portlaoise Prison	[2016] IESC 37, [2016] 3 R 619	The Irish state was found to be unable to implement sentencing in accord with the Transfer of Sentenced Persons Act 1995.

== Family ==
Case name	Citation	Summary
P.F v G.O'M (Otherwise G.F)	[2000] IESC 81	Clarified the grounds for annulment of marriage in relation to informed consent.
T(D) v L(F) & Anor	[2003] IESC 59	In relation to foreign divorce proceedings, the burden of proof is on the parties to establish their domicile.
K. (C.) v K. (J.)	[2004] 2 ILRM 168, [2004] IESC 21, [2004] 1 IR 224	Held that the doctrine of estoppel could not be used to change the status of a person, when the status, as a matter of law, never actually changed.
McD v L	[2007] IESC 28, [2008] 1 IR 417	Granted visitation rights to sperm donors.
Gt v Kao	[2007] IESC 55, [2008] 3 IR 567	An unmarried father who has been actively involved in raising his children or child is eligible for legal custody rights.
Nottinghamshire County Council v B	[2011] IESC 48; [2013] 4 IR 662	Refused to overturn an order of the High Court returning children of married parents from England to that jurisdiction.
Child and Family Agency v RD	[2014] IESC 47	Confirmed that jurisdiction of EU states which first issue orders have primacy but that the High Court in Ireland has the right under EU law to grant provisional protection orders to allow a child to stay in Ireland.
MR and DR v An t-Ard-Chláraitheoir	[2014] IESC 60	It was decided that children born through surrogacy will have the name of their birth mother on their birth certificate and not the mother who is going to raise them.
O.R v an Tard Chlairaitheoir	[2014] IESC 60	The Court held that the Civil Registration Act 2004 only allows the birth mother to be on the birth certificate.
Child and Family Agency (formerly Health Service Executive) v O.A.	[2015] IESC 52	The court determined the grounds where a family should be granted legal costs.
H v H	[2015] IESC 85	Guidelines for when common law principles could be reinterpreted.
Child and Family Agency (Formerly Health Service Executive) v OA	2015] IESC 52, [2015] 2 ILRM 145,[2015] 2 IR 718	Addressed payment o child care costs the context of unsuccessful challenge by the Child and Family Agency
Child and Family Agency v McG and JC	[2017] IESC 9, [2017] 1 IR 1	Where a detention was lacking in due process of law due to breach of fundamental requirements of justice, it may be challenged through an application for release under the constitutional principle of habeas corpus even in the case of disputes as to the custody of children.

== Finance ==
Case name	Citation	Summary
Fyffes Plc v DCC Plc	[2005] IESC 3	Disclosure of privileged documents to a third party does not always destroy or waive the privilege over expert advice obtained in connection with litigation and pending criminal prosecution for insider dealing.
Director of Corporate Enforcement v Barry Seymour	[2011] IESC 45; [2013] 1 IR 82	Commercial misjudgement was not in itself sufficient to justify disqualification as a company director under the Companies Act 1990.
Bank of Ireland v O'Donnell & ors	[2015] IESC 90	Clarified the grounds for recusal under grounds of "objective bias."
Irish Life and Permanent plc v Dunne	[2015] IESC 46; [2016] 1 IR 92	Clarified the impact of a lender failing to comply with the Code of Conduct on Mortgage Arrears 2010 (the “Code”) on that lender's right to obtain an order of possession of mortgaged property.
Collins v Minister for Finance	[2016] IESC 73; [2017] 1 ILRM 65; [2017] 3 IR 99	Legalised emergency measures to deal with Ireland's 2008 financial crisis.

== Immigration ==
Case name	Citation	Summary
P., L., & B. v Minister for Justice Equality and Law Reform	[2001] IESC 107, [2002] 1 ILRM 16	Refusal of an application for asylum may constitute a sufficient basis for the government to order the applicant's deportation.
Z. v Minister for Justice, Equality and Law Reform	[2002] IESC 14	The absence of an oral hearing need not infringe the right of an applicant for refugee status to natural and constitutional justice.
Lobe v Minister for Justice, Equality and Law Reform	[2003] IESC 3	Applicant minors enjoy, in general terms, the right not to be expelled form the state—a right subject to limited qualification (such as lawful extradition to another state).
Dimbo v Minister for Justice	[2008] IESC 26	A deportation order must consider facts that are specific to the individual child.
Okunade v Minister for Justice & Others	[2012] IESC 49	Disruption to family life and risk to children are grounds to grant an interlocutory injunction.
H.N. v Minister for Justice, Equality and Law Reform and others	[2012] IESC 58	In Irish law an applicant could not apply for subsidiary protection without first applying for, and then being refused refugee status.
Sulaimon v Minister for Justice Equality and Law Reform	[2012] IESC 63	The court quashed the Minister's decision on the refusal to issue a Certificate of Nationality.
Smith v Minister for Justice and Equality	[2013] IESC 4	The court decided that in this case, the right of a citizen to have a family was not enough to warrant the revocation of deportation order, as the deportation of the appellant would not force his child to leave the jurisdiction and thus would not deprive the citizen of their right to live in the European Union.
A (a Minor) v Minister for Justice and Equality and others	[2013] IESC 18	A certificate of leave to appeal is not required in order to appeal to the Supreme Court a decision of the High Court to dismiss proceedings as frivolous or vexatious.
AMS v Minister for Justice and Equality	[2014] IESC 65	The Minister for Justice can evaluate the financial burden that a refugee's dependents may put on the State when assessing an application for entry.
T.D v Minister for Justice Equality and Law Reform	[2014] IESC 29	The court issued a determination concerning the equivalence of Irish and EU immigration statutes.
Sivsivadze v Minister for Justice	[2015] IESC 53; [2015] 2 ILRM 73; [2016] 2 IR 403	Dismissed a challenge to the constitutionality of section 3(1) of the Immigration Act 1999 (the "1999 Act"), under which the Minister for Justice order the deportation of a non-national (without permission to remain in the State) for an indefinite period.
N.V.H v Minister for Justice & Equality	[2017] IESC 35	Employment rights for asylum seekers could be restricted but a "complete" ban violates the right to seek employment.
Y.Y. v Minister for Justice and Equality	[2017] IESC 61	Article 3 of the European Convention on Human Rights which prohibits torture, inhuman or degrading treatment was absolute; the Minister for Justice and Equality should consider this possibility when making a deportation order.
AAA & Anor v Minister for Justice & Ors	[2017] IESC 80	Clarified the grounds under which a claim for subsidiary protection could be heard.

== Procedural ==
Case name	Citation	Summary
Wunder v Hospitals Trust	Supreme Court, unreported, Walsh, Haugh and O’Keeffe JJ., 24 January 1967	Frivolous or vexations proceedings.
Bula Ltd v Tara Mines Ltd (No 6)	[2000] 4 IR 412	The court considered the test for objective bias in Ireland.
Adam v The Minister for Justice, Equality and Law Reform	[2001] IESC 38 ]; [2001] 2 ILRM 452	Confirmed conditions under which judicial review could be struck out as frivolous.
Braddish v DPP	[2001] 3 IR 127]; [2001] IESC 45; [2002] 1 ILRM 151	Prosecution based on a video tape not available the accused was quashed.
SIAC Construction Ltd v The County Council of the County of Mayo	[2002] IESC 39	A tender-awarding authority is required to respect the general principles of equality, transparency, and objectivity.
Dunne v Director of Public Prosecutions	[2002] 2 IR 305; [2002] IESC 27; [2002] 2 ILRM 241	Fair procedure imposes a duty on the prosecution to seek out and preserve all evidence that has a bearing or a potential bearing on the issue of guilt or innocence.
Ryanair p.l.c. v Aer Rianta c.p.t.	[2003] IESC 62	When addressing issues relating to discovery the burden of proof rests firmly on the party seeking the discovery.
DB v The Minister for Health	[2003] 3 IR 12, [2003] IESC 22	The literal approach (wording is interpreted using the "natural" and "ordinary" meaning of language) should always be used first when it comes to interpreting statutes.
Goold v Collins and Ors	[2004] IESC 38; [2004] 7 JIC 1201	A statutory provision's constitutionality may be reviewed only at the behest of a litigant who is contesting some current application of that provision.
Murphy v County Wexford VEC	[2004] IESC 49; [2004] 4 IR 202	School Authorities owe a duty to those pupils to take reasonable care to ensure that the pupils do not suffer injury.
Gilroy v Flynn	[2004] IESC 98; [2005] 1 ILRM 290	Excessive delays in the delivery of a statement of claim are no longer acceptable even where the fault of the delay lies with a professional adviser, and not the plaintiff.
Sheedy v Information Commissioner	[2005] IESC 35; [2005] 2 IR 272	The court in this instance ruled that the statutory privilege to deny access to the data of schools superseded the various Freedom of Information provisions.
D.C. v DPP	[2005] IESC 77	A trial can be prohibited "where there is a real or serious risk of an unfair trial."
Dundon v Governor of Cloverhill Prison	[2005] IESC 83	First person extradited under a European Arrest Warrant
PM v Director of Public Prosecutions	[2006] 3 IR 172, [2006] IESC 22; [2006] 2 ILRM 361	Prosecutorial delay that deprives an accused of the right to a speedy trial is, in and of itself, one factor to consider in carrying out the balancing exercise.
Dunne v Minister for the Environment, Heritage and Local Government	[2007] IESC 60	Court has discretion in charges for cases brought in the public interest.
Gerald J.P. Stephens v Paul Flynn Ltd	[2008] IESC 4; [2008] 4 IR 31	Absent special circumstances, a party's failure to deliver a statement of claim within a period of twenty months is inexcusable and will justify dismissal of the litigation.
Bank of Ireland Mortgage Bank v Coleman	[2009] 2 ILRM 363; [2009] 3 IR 699	The Court clarified the inherent jurisdiction of the court with respect of a solicitor's misconduct.
MJELR v Rettinger	[2010] IESC 45; [2010] 3 IR 783	Established grounds to resist a European Arrest Warrant in the context of Article 3 of the European Convention on Human Rights (ECHR).
Irwin v Deasy	[2010] IESC 45; [2011] 2 IR 752	Section 71(4) of the Registration of Title Act 1964 does not authorise division or sale in place of partition.
Board of Management St. Molaga's National School v The Secretary General of the Department of Education and Science	[2010] IESC 57; [2011] 1 IR 362	Under Section 29 of the Education Act 1998, the decision of a school's board of management to refuse to enrol a student may be subject to a full re-hearing by an appeals committee appointed by the Minister for Education.
McInerney Homes Ltd v Cos Acts 1990	[2011] IESC 31	The onus of proof under the Company Acts lay with the examiner to show that a proposed scheme of debt restructuring was not unfair to any interested party.
Comcast Int. Holdings v Minister for Public Enterprise & ors and Persona Digital Telephony Ltd v Minister for Public Enterprise & ors	[2012] IESC 50	The decision by Michael Lowery, then Minister for Public Enterprise, to award a phone license to ESAT was "unlawful."
Ryan v Governor of Midlands Prison	[2014] IESC 54	A court order detaining a convicted individual that is not prima facie invalid should only be challenged through an appeal of the conviction or an application for judicial review.
F.X. v The Clinical Director of Central Mental Hospital and Another	[2014] IESC 1; [2014] 1 IR 280	The court "clarified two important points about the habeas corpus jurisdiction".
Island Ferries Teoranta v Minister for Communications	[2015] IESC 95; [2015] 3 IR 637	The court held that the determination of whether or not there has been an abuse of a dominant position is fact-specific and is based on an analysis of all relevant factors
Moylist Construction Limited v Doheny	[2016] IESC 9; [2016] 2 IR 283	A court should not entertain an application to dismiss proceedings where the legal issues or questions of construction arising in the case are complex.
Nowak v Data Protection Commissioner	[2016] IESC 18	Answers provided by a candidate sitting an exam can be considered as information relating to the candidate and thus can be defined as the personal data of the candidate.
CC v Minister for Justice	[2016] IESC 48	Reexamination of a previously established test with respect to whether an order for deportation could be granted where an appeal was pending within the courts system.
McCann v Halpin	[2016] IESC 11	This case, defined the close of business hours and made it clear that the rule of construction should be used in letters of demands or contracts.
Wansboro v DPP and anor	[2017] IESCDET 115	Established grounds for expedited appeal to the Supreme Court.
Quinn Insurance Ltd v Price Waterhouse Cooper	[2017] IESC 73	Ruling on the right to leave to appeal.
Persona Digital Telephony Ltd v Minister for Public Enterprise, Ireland	[2017] IESC 27	Third party funding to support a plaintiff's legal costs and disbursements is unlawful.
Permanent TSB Plc v Langan and Anor	[2017] IESC 71	

== Tort ==
Case name	Citation	Summary
Byrne v Ireland	[1972] IR 241	Abolished the immunity of the state in tort
Gough v Neary & Cronin	[2003] IESC 39; [2003] IR 92; [2004] 1 ILRM 35	Claim for personal injury was not statute barred.
Doherty v Reynolds and St. James's Hospital Board	[2004] IESC 42	Under the doctrine of res ipsa loquitur, where an injury would not be expected to occur without negligence, negligence on the part of those charged with the thing's management may be presumed from the mere fact of injury/
Philp v Ryan	[2004] IESC 105	Held that a plaintiff's 'lost chance' is actionable in the context of medical negligence
Geraldine Weir-Rodgers v SF Trust Ltd	[2005] IESC 2	Confirmed that under Section 4 of the Occupiers Liability Act 1995 an occupier of land is not required to safeguard trespassers or recreational users.
Harold Wildgust and Carrickowen Ltd v Bank of Ireland and Norwich Union Life Assurance Society	[2005] IESC 19; [2006] 2 ILRM 28; [2006] 1 IR 570; [2007] 3 IR 39	The court outlined the "proximity test" which is to be used in cases involving negligent misstatement and held that duty of care concerning negligent misstatement is not confined to the persons to whom the misstatement is actually made.
Delahunty v Player and Willis (Ireland) Ltd.	[2006] IESC 21	Granted permission to pursue tobacco companies for damages.
Quinn -v- Irish Bank Resolution Corporation Ltd (In Special Liquidation) & ors	[2015] IESC 29	Decided whether or not a contract is automatically unenforceable if it is illegal.
Walsh v Jones Lang Lasalle Ltd	[2017] IESC 38	A purchaser bears the risk of reliance on erroneous information unless the vendor has clearly assumed responsibility for its accuracy.

== See also ==
- High Court (Ireland)
