= CC v Minister for Justice =

Irish Supreme Court case

CC v Minister for Justice and Equality
- Coat of arms of Ireland
- Court: Supreme Court of Ireland
- Full case name: Charles & ors v Minister for Justice and Equality & ors
- Decided: 28 July 2016
- Citation: [2016] IESC 48

Court membership
- Judges sitting: Denham CJ, O'Donnell Donal J, Clarke J, MacMenamin J, Dunne J, Charleton J, O'Malley J.

Case opinions
- The Supreme Court concluded that the principles set out in Okunade v Minister for Justice and Equality [2012] 3 IR 152 should apply where an appeal was pending within the courts system.
- Decision by: Clarke J and MacMenamin J

Keywords
- Asylum Seekers; Injunction

CC v Minister for Justice [2016] 2 IR 680; [2016] IESC 48 (also referred to as Charles v Minister for Justice) is an Irish Supreme Court case in which the Court dismissed an appeal by the State to issue a deportation order against a Malawian family who were seeking asylum in Ireland. In this case, the Court had to reexamine a previously established test with respect to whether an order for deportation could be granted where an appeal was pending within the courts system. Ultimately, the Court decided that there was no need for refinements as the general principle identified in that test can be applied across a wide number of cases.

== Background ==
The applicant in this case, Charles (CC), his wife and their two children, had their application for refugee status denied in 2008. As a result, he filled an application for subsidiary protection and leave to remain in Ireland without challenging the initial denial of refugee status. In 2011, the Minister for Justice and Equality rejected the family's request for subsidiary protection and request for leave to remain in Ireland. This resulted in an order of deportation of the family under section 3 of the Immigration Act 1999.

On appeal of the decision for deportation, the High Court refused the family's judicial review of the decision and the family then appealed this decision to the Supreme Court in 2012.

== Holding of the High Court ==
The High Court justified their decision for deportation by claiming that it had partook in a "lengthy correspondence" with the family's solicitors and that the family had failed to show up in court for a number of sittings. They also moved address to avoid their pending deportation. Cooke J based his denial on the fact that the family had gone "off the radar" as far as the Court was concerned throughout the duration of the asylum application.

== Holding of the Supreme Court ==
Written judgments were provided by Clarke J and MacMenamin J, with whom the other judges concurred (in full or part).

The Supreme Court found that the current legislation in place often resulted in a confusing system for those seeking asylum in Ireland and also for those seeking subsidiary protection. The Court felt that the current system in place did not serve its intended purpose and caused hardship on both the State and those seeking relief from it. In addition, counsel for the State had not established any persuasive arguments to revise the Okunade test.

The issue before this Court was that if the Okunade test can be applied ''in the context of a situation which arises pending an appeal after an adverse leave judgement upholding a decision to refuse subsidiary protection.'' The position of the State in this case has been that the Okunade test needs to revised in terms of stays or injunctions pending a decision to which the Charles family opposes. Consequently, it is necessary to understand what that test is before reaching any conclusion. The Court, when faced with cases pending a full hearing, has to make a decision that affords the least amount of injustice. This is the general rule that a court follows when looking to grant or reject an interlocutory injunction in the majority of private law cases. Okunade fell within the realm of immigration and even though in that case the Court was concerned with an injunction order, the judgement includes all forms of order which may be sought pending a full trial. Okunade also outlines how the general principle should be applied in public law cases.

- Firstly, an application can only proceed if the applicant submits an arguable case.
- Secondly, the court should look at the level of injustice. In doing so, a court must consider public importance, facts unique to the applicant, the consequences that an applicant may have to face if the measure challenged to which he is subject to is declared as unlawful. In addition, the Court should look at what damages can be provided. This is not to say that public and private law cases has different tests, rather that public law often leads to the same general principles as well. In so far as public law cases are concerned, the strength and weakness of a case may be taken into consideration when appropriate.

The Supreme Court pointed out that the problems associated with cases pending an appeal are the same kind of problems that come up in cases questioning whether to grant or reject an interlocutory injunction (or a stay) pending trial. This was said in Okunade as well. The interference of a court before the full trial has the same level of injustice in any case, whether that be an appeal or a trial because there is a risk that in the event a court deprives a party of a remedy, the same party could be said to entitle that remedy at the end of the final trial. So, the courts must establish a balance of the risk of injustice. The Court also acknowledged that in certain situations the way the general principle identified in Okunade is applied can differ but this does not mean that the test is different. Ultimately, there is only one test which can be used across all cases so the State's argument of refining this test is of little or perhaps no value. Moreover, this Court did not think it was necessary to decide whether the Court of Appeal had correctly applied the Okunade test or not.

The decision of MacMenamin J. found that the current system of appeals, judicial review and separate applications was "counter-productive." Many asylum seekers could not assimilate into society during their pending cases which also result in an accumulation of high legal costs to the State. The Court also noted that while there has been abuse of the Irish legal system by economic migrants posing as asylum seekers, the current case before him was of a young family.

The Supreme Court also countered the decision of Cooke J. that the family had gone "off the radar" for a while in order to avoid deportation. During this time, the family had continued to receive social welfare benefits having been registered with the Department of Social Protection and members of the family also held employment in Ireland. The Court found that the State had not taken any measures to trace the family and also noted that an attempt to trace the family would not have been difficult.
