= AMS v Minister for Justice and Equality =

Irish Supreme Court case

Ams v Minister for Justice and Equality
- Coat of arms of Ireland
- Court: Supreme Court of Ireland
- Decided: 20 November 2014
- Citation: [2015] 1 ILRM 170; [2014] IESC 65

Case history
- Appealed from: High Court
- Appealed to: Supreme Court

Court membership
- Judges sitting: Denham C.J., [Murray J., Hardiman J., Clarke J., [Dunne J.

Case opinions
- It was held that Section 18(4) of the Refugee Act 1996 allows the Minister for Justice and Equality to assess the financial burden that a refugees qualified dependants will put on the State, in regard to the application for their entry.
- Decision by: Mr. Justice Clarke

Keywords
- Immigration; Refugee Status; Family Reunification; Judicial Review Proceedings; Refugee Act, 1996, sec 18; Proportionality of discretion; Economic considerations

Ams v Minister for Justice and Equality, [2015] 1 ILRM 170; [2014] IESC 65, was an Irish Supreme Court case where the Court held that Section 18 (4) of the Refugee Act 1996 allowed the Minister of Justice to assess the potential financial strain that a refugee's dependents would place on the State while deciding on an application for entry.

== Background ==
Irish law allows the possibility of family reunification cases. A family member of a refugee in Ireland may apply to this provision. There are two classes of members identified by legislation: Section 18 (4) of the Refugee Act 1996. Section 18(3) states that automatic entitlement to the reunification is granted to spouses, unmarried minors and parents of minor refugees. Section 18(4) of the Act, states that in the case of family members outside of the mentioned scope, there is discretion in awarding reunification. The case of Ams v Minister for Justice deals with the latter, family members falling outside of Section 18(3) provision.

Mr. S, a Somalian citizen born in 1985, arrived in Ireland seeking asylum in May 2007 and was granted refugee status in January 2009. Mr. S applied to the Minister of Justice, under Section 18 of the Act, seeking family reunification for: his wife, mother, daughter, two of his sisters, and two brothers. Mr. S completed the necessary application forms without the assistance of a Lawyer. In his application, Mr.S stated that he and his mentioned family members, had lived as one unit in Somalia. He said that his family members were living in a refugee camp in Mogadishu. While he was completing a questionnaire, Mr. S failed to answer a question "seeking information on financial dependency on the part of the relevant family members towards him". Mr. S said that the mentioned family members were unemployed at the time of his application. He said that he was looking for a job, which would provide for him and his family members. He did not reply to a question on social welfare benefits. From this information, a report was drafted and given to the Minister of Justice on September 1, 2009, after having been considered by the Office of the Refugee Applications Commissioner (ORAC).

In early 2010, Mr. S received the news that his daughter and one of his brothers had died in a bomb attack while the family were leaving the refugee camp in Mogadishu, heading towards the Ethiopian border. Mr. S obtained a solicitor the same year. The solicitor provided the Minister with additional documents in support of Mr. S's application of family reunification. The Minister was informed that Mr. S's family was undocumented in Ethiopia, and renting an apartment in Addis Ababa. The family were receiving financial aid from Mr. S. The Minister was informed of Mr. S's mother's deteriorating health. His mother suffered from hypertension, chronic liver disease, chronic rheumatism, dementia and depression.

In 2011 Mr. S's solicitor wrote to the Minister, seeking a decision be issued within eight days. The Minister replied that he required more information to come to a decision. On May 4, 2011, Mr. S was granted the reunification for his wife, as according to Section 18(3) of the Act. However, the reunification was denied to the remaining family members. Due to Section 18(4) of the Act. The denied family members applied a second time, following a second denial decision made July 2012. There were Judicial Review proceedings brought forward in order to reverse the second denial. These reviews were in relation to Mr. S's mother and little sister. These were a success in A.M.S. v. Minister for Justice and Equality †[2014] IEHC 57. This case is an appeal of that decision, by the Appellant (the Minister).

It was established that the Mr. S's mother and sister were financially dependent on Mr. S. However, due to Mr.S's only income being his social welfare payments the Minister deemed that the reunification would be a financial burden to the State.

=== Issues ===
The first issue relevant to this appeal concerns the determination of the proper interpretation of Section 18 of the Refugee Act 1996. The second issue is in regards to the question of proportionality. The principle of proportionality must have been applied by the Minister in his refusing the family reunification of Mr. S's family members.

== Holding of the Supreme Court ==
The judgement was delivered by Clarke, J. He said that Section18(4) of the Act provides the Minister with discretion in considering cases, during the assessment of a refugee's application for family reunification. The Minister was found to have the power to decide whether or not the refugee's dependents would prove to be a financial burden on the State. The main issue was the proportionality of the Minister's discretion. The Court found the Ministers' 'balancing exercise' to be wrong, and his appeal was dismissed.

The Court therefore, overruled MacEochaigh J's decision. The court held it was not within the Ministers' power to decide whether a reunification would result in a financial burden on the State: "However, again for the reasons set out in this judgment, I am satisfied that MacEochaidh J. was correct to conclude that the decision of the Minister to refuse family reunification in respect of the mother and the minor sister of Mr. S was disproportionate on the facts of this case. No wider financial consequences other than those applicable to just those persons were taken into account."

== Subsequent Developments ==
Ams v Minister for Justice and Equality judgement overturned an earlier decision: Hassan, which decided that the Minister has the power to deny an application where the applicant is found to not have future means to support his dependants, without State intervention. This judgement established that each case must be assessed independently.
