= Adam v The Minister for Justice, Equality and Law Reform =

Irish Supreme Court case

- Coat of arms of Ireland
- Court: Supreme Court of Ireland
- Full case name: Toma Adam and Ors. (Appellant) v The Minister for Justice Ireland and The Attorney General (Respondent)
- Decided: 5 April 2001
- Citation: [2001] 3 IR 53;[2001] 2 ILRM 452; [2001] IESC 38

Case history
- Appealed from: High Court
- Appealed to: Supreme Court

Court membership
- Judges sitting: Hardiman J, McGuinness J, Murray J

Case opinions
- To challenge the decision of a public authority in judicial review proceedings, one must attempt to rely on proved individual circumstances.
- Decision by: McGuinness J, Hardiman J

Keywords
- Constitution of Ireland | Constitution | Personal Rights | Appeal | Judicial Review | Asylum

Adam v The Minister for Justice, Equality and Law Reform [2001] IESC 38 is a reported decision of the Irish Supreme Court, in which the Court, in affirming High Court orders to strike out two judicial review proceedings as frivolous, held that, to challenge the decision of a public authority, one must attempt to rely on proved individual circumstances.

== Background ==
There are two appeals at hand here, the Toma Adam case and the Florin Iordache case. Toma Adam case will be referred to as "the Toma Adam proceedings" and the Florin Iordache case will be referred to as "the Iordache proceedings". The appeals are heard together because of the High Court judgment in 2001.

In the Toma Adam appeal, the Applicants claimed that they came to Ireland to seek asylum as they were abused in Romania, they were oppressed of their human rights, and as a result of both of these facts, they were afraid of the same occurrences if they returned to Romania. There was no real evidence presented of either the abuse or the breach of their human rights. The High Court granted them leave to seek judicial review. The applicants were allowed to seek two reliefs: An Order of Certiorari and An Order of Mandamus. Applicants also wanted the Respondents to seek a case against Romania under the law of the European Convention on Human Rights, however, the High Court did not allow this. The Respondents later opposed the applicants and sought two orders: to discharge the High Court's decision to allow a judicial review, and to get rid of the Applicants legal action overall as they make no proper case against the Respondent and it has no serious purpose.

O'Donovan J. in the High Court, held that the Court has power to analyse the decision that granted leave to seek judicial review. The Judge also held that it is wrong that all of the Applicants were put together in one case. It was then held that the European Convention on Human Rights does not involve Irish domestic law and the Minister for Justice does not need to apply such law in his actions. Lastly, it was held that there is no proof that the Minister did not take into consideration the actions in Romania or that there was any breach of natural justice.

In the Iordache proceedings, Florin Iordache was seeking judicial review on the basis that when he lived in Romania he suffered a lot of abuse and injustice due to his sexual orientation. Laffoy J. in the High Court, allowed the Applicant to seek: An Order of Certiorari, An Order of Mandamus for the Respondents to take into consideration the Applicants wish to stay in Ireland due to asylum, An Order of Mandamus making the Respondents initiate a claim against Romania, and lastly an order to seek damages.

In regards to the Iordache proceedings, the High Court held: that the Court has power to analyse the decision that granted leave to seek judicial review just like in the Adam proceedings. It was held that the European Convention on Human Rights does not involve Irish domestic law and the Minister for Justice does not need to apply such law in his actions. Also it was held that there was no proof that the deportation was in breach of Section 3 of the Immigration Act 1999. It was lastly held that making the State to bring a case against Romania was bound to fail as it would go against Article 29.4.1 of the Constitution.

The High Court then held that the Applicants legal action should be dismissed overall as they make no proper case against the Respondent and it has no serious purpose. The Judge held that if an appeal of his decision is made to the Supreme Court, then both the Toma Adam's proceedings and the Iordache case should be heard together.

== Opinion of the Supreme Court ==
The judgments were brought by McGuinness J., and Hardiman J.

The Issues

The first issue at hand is whether a High Court can clear the judgment of another judge in the High Court, which granted leave for judicial review to the Applicant.

The second issue is whether in the Toma Adam and Iordache cases, the Applicants made a strong case for judicial review proceedings.

Judgment of Mrs Justice McGuinness

McGuinness J. firstly agrees with the lawyers who were present in the High Court that there is no precise Irish authority on the matter regarding whether a High Court has the authority to dismiss an order for leave which has previously been given. However, in the case of Adams v DPP, the judge dismissed an order for leave which was granted before.

Judge McGuinness referred to the test set out in G v DPP, the first part of the test was whether the Applicants had a "sufficient interest in the matter". The judge explained that at this stage it is unclear with each Applicant as to what is his/her precise interest in the case. The judge agreed with O'Donovan J (High Court judge), that it is not right to have such a big group of Applicants put together. Furthermore, Judge McGuinness said that the biggest problem here for the Applicants are parts B) and C) of the test in G v DPP, she stated that if the Applicants affidavit had a specific and strong ground as to why such relief was being sought, then the Applicants would get such relief.

McGuinness J. then went on to talk about the affidavits of Mr Pendred (Solicitor). The affidavits regarded the matter of different ways in which the applicants could suffer persecution in Romania. McGuinness J. felt that in this case the affidavits were stated in "very general terms". She reminded everyone that a judicial review is not another appeal, it is about the procedures that were used to come to a decision. The judge explained that an Applicant, when seeking leave for a judicial review must produce an affidavit that specifically establishes how he/she believes the decision making procedure was wrong.

Judge McGuinness contrasted this case with R v Secretary of State for the Home Department, ex parte Turgut [2001] 1 All ER 719, where "1,500 specific pages of specific evidence were submitted to the Court." In this case, on the other hand, the judge could not find whether the facts supported a proper ground for the relief being fought, "because neither in the Adam proceedings nor the Iordache proceedings did the pleadings set out any specific evidence that the Minister had failed to have regard to the situation in Romania when considering the position of the Applicants."

The judge found that the Applicants did not provide much evidence for their claims and did not put forward a strong case. For these reasons, Judge McGuinness dismissed both appeals and affirmed the orders of the High Court.

Judgment of Hardiman J.

Judge Hardiman, when deciding on the conclusion of the case, looked at whether the Applicants provided a strong, reasonable case, or whether these cases are "frivolous or vexatious or doomed to fail".

Hardiman J., began his judgment by saying that the Applicants did not have strong evidence, they instead are simply claiming that Romania is a place where deportation should not be allowed. These allegations were made by "Counsels advice", there was no real proof as to why deportation should be disallowed.

As for the Adam proceedings, the judge stated that there was nothing presented, to clearly show the individual situations of the applicants. Hardiman J., then explained that although Mr. Iordache had more specific reasons for his application, it was still quite vague. "No applicant has made out a credible cause that he or she has an individual fear of persecution."

The judge then used the case of Finnucare v McMahon [1990] ILRM 505, to show contract with the case at hand. In the Finnucare case, the Plaintiff showed with strong evidence that he could not be sent back to Northern Ireland. In contrast, the Applicants in this case, apart from Mr. Iordache, did not attempt to show evidence, as Hardiman J., states in his judgment.

Mr. Iordache was given permission to seek a case against Romania in the High Court, however, Hardiman J., stated, "I consider that no Court has jurisdiction to direct any such order to the executive". He also referred to Article 29.4.1 of the Irish Constitution to give source to his statement. He explained that it would be against the Constitution if the Court began proceedings against Romania. If this were to happen, as the judge explained, then the court would be performing a function which is meant for the Government, it would disregard the separation of powers.

Hardiman J. concluded that this case had no proper facts, apart from Mr. Iordache's case. He found these proceedings to be "frivolous, vexatious and doomed to fail: indeed they are scarcely recognisable as legal proceedings at all."

Like in Judge McGuinness' conclusion, Hardiman J. also referred to the case R v Secretary of State for the Home Department, ex parte Turgut [2001] 1 All ER 719, to contrast with the case at hand.

Lastly, Hardiman J. added that he also agreed with O'Donovan J. (High Court), that all of these Applicants should not have had their cases put into one proceeding without having their situations distinguished individually.

Hardiman J. dismissed the appeal and affirmed the order of the High Court.

== See also ==
- Supreme Court of Ireland
- High Court (Ireland)
- Certiorari
- Mandamus
- European Convention on Human Rights
- Constitution of Ireland
