= Dimbo v Minister for Justice =

Supreme Court of Ireland case

Dimbo v Minister for Justice 2008
- Court: Supreme Court of Ireland
- Full case name: Dimbo v Minister for Justice 2008
- Decided: 2008
- Citation: [2008] 27 ILT 231

Case history
- Appealed from: High Court
- Appealed to: Supreme Court

Court membership
- Judges sitting: Murray CJ. Fennelly J. Kearns J. Finnegan J Denham J.

Keywords
- Asylum Immigration and Nationality; Deportation

The case of Dimbo v Minister for Justice [2008] IESC 26; [2008] 27 ILT 231; [2008] 5 JIC 0101 was a Supreme Court case that held that when deciding to make a deportation order in relation to the parents of an Irish born citizen under s.3 of the Immigration Act 1999, the state must consider facts that are specific to the individual child, his or her age, current educational progress, development and opportunities and his/her attachment to the community.

== Background ==
George Dimbo was born in Ireland on 6 May 1996. Mrs Ifedinma Dimbo is Mr George Dimbo's mother and is married to Mr Ethelbert Dimbo. The parents had applied for asylum during the summer of 2005 which was refused. The parents are both Nigerian nationals and based on the IBC 05 Scheme, applied for citizenship after their son was born. However, their application was refused on 16 August 2005. A big reason why this application was refused is because the couple did not meet the continuous residence criteria under the IBC 05 Scheme. Their deportation orders made in 2004 remained as valid and the Minister gave both of them a final chance to submit written submissions as to why they should remain in Ireland. In November 2005, Mr George Dimbo wrote to the Minister requesting to allow his parents to stay in Ireland and that he himself wished to live in Ireland and attend his school. Mrs Dimbo came to the State in 1995 on a student visa and was studying at University College Cork. She gave birth to Mr George Dimbo in 1996. She was granted permission to stay based on the citizenship her child received. However, in 1998 she left the state and returned to Nigeria. In 2002, she returned to Ireland and tried to have "her earlier residency extended" but was refused. Her husband came to Ireland in 2003 on a visitor's visa and they both admitted to leaving the State in 2004. The Minister made his decision to deport the parents on the basis of section 3(6) of the Immigration Act 1999 and section 5 of the Refugee Act 1996 as amended.

This decision came as a result of the couple failure to prove that they had continuously been living in Ireland since their child was born. The High Court held that Mr George Dimbo has only spend "approximately three and a half years in the State" despite being nine years old in 2005. The Court continued however, finding that since February 2005 he had been attending the same school as in 2003 when he was present in the country in County Meath. The High Court was satisfied that at the time the Minister made his decision, Mr George Dimbo had "actively participated in his school and school related activities, in which relationships had been formed in this period". His decision to refuse the parents' applications was found to breach the Irish Constitution as he did not take into account the rights of the child. The Court found that the Minister did not consider the "best interests" of the child when serving the parents with a deportation order.

== Holding of the Supreme court ==
In the Supreme Court, Denham J stated that the Minister was acting under the terms set out by the IBC 05 Scheme and that his appeal was "misconceived". The scheme set out that an applicant must continuously reside in the State since the birth of their child in order to receive citizenship. This criterion allows the Minister to exercise exclusive power on certain foreign nationals. The Supreme Court was of the opinion that the Minister in this case had acted under the guidelines of the scheme. Regarding the individuals' constitutional rights and rights given under the convention, the Court found that the scheme does not oblige a Minister to take these rights into account when making a decision.

The supreme court agreed with the High Court to quash the deportation order made by the Minister on several grounds. Firstly, it was found that the Minister failed to review the rights of the child in Ireland and those under s. 3 of the European Convention on Human Rights Act 2003. By deporting the parents of the child, the family unit will be destroyed and the child will be removed from the State which he is a citizen of. This will ultimately breach Article 41 of the Irish Constitution. Moreover, the Minister did not give substantial reasons for the deportation. The Supreme Court agreed with the lower court even though Denham J disagreed with the High Court in relation to the Minister having to consider the Irish born child's educational circumstances in the country they are to return to. The Minister should instead "consider in a general fashion the situation in the country where the child's parent may be deported." A detailed research of the country to which the parents are ordered to return to is only necessary in exceptional cases. As in Chuka Paul Oguewke and Others v Minister for Justice, Equality and Reform, this Court too decided that there is no specific list of factors that the Minister should take into consideration. Every case should be assessed on its own unique facts and a fair balance should be established. In this case, on one hand is the Appellants' right to family life with reference to Mr George Dimbo's rights as an Irish citizen and on the other hand is public policy issues of the State.

Consideration should be given to the education of the child, the age, development and opportunities available to the child. How much these factors will impact an application is based on the facts of that application, meaning has the child lived in Ireland for many years, has the child been involved in the community and school activities and so on so forth. The Supreme Court upheld the decision of the High Court in quashing the deportation orders because the Minister did not take the rights of Mr George Dimbo into account especially when he had himself written a letter explaining his progress in school. In conclusion, the Minister had to take into account the constitutional and conventional rights of all Appellants including the Irish child when making his decision on ordering a deportation. Otherwise, the deportation orders will not be valid.

== See also ==
- Supreme Court of Ireland
- High Court (Ireland)
