= Irwin v Deasy =

Irish Supreme Court case

Irwin v Deasy [2011] IESC 15
- Coat of arms of Ireland
- Court: Supreme Court of Ireland
- Full case name: Liam J. Irwin v Thomas Deasy (and by order) Carmel Deasy [2011] IESC 15
- Decided: 13 May 2011
- Citations: [2010] IESC 34 (Unrep, SC, 14/5/2010); [2011] IESC 15; [2011] 2 IR 752; [2012] 1 ILRM 12
- Transcript: https://www.bailii.org/ie/cases/IESC/2011/S15.html

Case history
- Appealed from: High Court of Ireland
- Appealed to: Supreme Court of Ireland

Court membership
- Judges sitting: Finnegan J., Macken J., O'Donnell J.

Case opinions
- The Supreme Court ruled that section 71(4) of the Registration of Title Act 1964 does not authorise division or sale in place of partition. The High Court's decision was upheld and the appeal was dismissed.

Liam J. Irwin v Thomas Deasy (and by order) Carmel Deasy [2011] IESC 15; [2011] 2 IR 752 is an Irish Supreme Court case which primarily concerned the authority of the court to order a sale of the lands in place of their partition and the potential effect that would have on the interests of the co-owners.

The case involved the enforcement of three judgment mortgages granted by the High Court to the plaintiff which attached to the interest of the first defendant on registered land the he owned. The plaintiff sought an order for sale in lieu of partition of the land, which was denied by the High Court. That decision was appealed to the Supreme Court, where it was argued that the Court erred in law due to the Registration of Title Act 1964 and the Land and Conveyancing Law Reform Act 2009.

The parties went on to settle the matter between themselves before the case was heard before the Supreme Court, but the Court addressed the appeal due to exceptional circumstances, as it thought ruling on issues such as these would answer questions of public importance. The Supreme Court decided that section 71(4) of the Registration of Title Act 1964 does not give the Court the authority to order a sale, a division, or a sale in lieu of partition. Thus, the appeal was dismissed and the High Court decision was affirmed.

== Background ==
The person who filed the appeal was the Collector General and worked for the Revenue Commissioners. They went to court on behalf of the Minister of Finance and the central fund. On Folio 8249 of the Register of County Cork, the respondents are listed as joint occupants of the land. Judge Geoghegan joined Carmel Deasy as a co-defendant in the High Court. He did this as the High Court would not force the sale without Carmel Deasy's involvement. The land in Folio 8249 needed to be divided or sold, and the High Court had to decide if it had the authority to do so. Judge Laffoy ruled that the Court lacked the jurisdiction to impose a sale and opted to partition the registered land.

=== Grounds of appeal ===
The High Court's ruling was challenged, claiming it violated the Registration of Title Act 1964 and the Land and Conveyancing Law Reform Act 2009. The appellant arguing the High Court's ruling was legally incorrect due to the following reasons:

- i) The Partition Act of 1868 (sections 3 and 4) did provide the High Court with the authority to issue a sale order in place of partition prior to the introduction of the Registration of Title Act 1964.
- ii) Even if the judge made a legal error with Section 71(4) of the Registration of Title Act of 1964, there would have been no reason to appeal if the land had been unregistered but registered in the Registry of Deeds.

The applicable law in this case was in place before the Land and Conveyancing Law Reform Act of 2009, Section 31, came into effect.

== Holding of the Supreme Court ==
The Supreme Court heard the appeal even though the procedures were completed and there was no longer a legal issue between the parties. The peculiar circumstance is what caused this to occur. The Supreme Court would continue to decide on issues of public interest even if the parties who brought the matter to court are no longer participating.

Before making a decision, the Supreme Court talked about dividing the land. The court said that co-owners who lived together could end their relationship if they both agreed to do so. They could give each person an equal share of the properties or sell the properties and split the money from the sales. The Act for Joint Tenants of 1542 established this in law.

Section 3 of the Constitution said that the Court could order a sale or a split before the Partition Act of 1868. But the court could only use this power if they were sure that selling the land would be better than a split for both sides. If one party wants to sell, they have to prove that selling would be better for them.

The court has a lot of discretion in determining how to assist a judgment mortgage under Section 71(4) of the Registration of Title Act of 1964. According to the Supreme Court, the guidelines in this section are clear and must be adhered to. The appellant requested a sale rather than a division of the land, and the Supreme Court determined that the judge was correct in stating that Sections 3 and 4 of the Partition Act did not provide the court the authority to approve that request. The person who filed the appeal, a judgment mortgagee of registered land, requested a sale rather than a division of the land. The Supreme Court is also certain that Section 71(4) of the Registration of Title Act of 1964 does not allow the court the authority to approve a court order to accept a judgement mortgage's request for division or sale in place of a partition.

The High Court's decision was upheld, and the appeal was denied.

== Subsequent developments ==
The Land and Conveyancing Law Reform Act of 2009 was enacated with the goal of modernising Irish property law by removing some of the uncertainty present in outdated legislation.The Act has clarified the differences between Irish and English law.
