= DPP v Cronin (No. 2) =

Irish Supreme Court case

- Coat of arms of Ireland
- Court: Supreme Court of Ireland
- Full case name: The People at the suit of the Director of Public Prosecutions v Mark Cronin
- Decided: 3 March 2006
- Citation: [2006] 4 IR 329; [2006] IESC 9; [2006] 2 ILRM 401
- Transcript: https://www.bailii.org/ie/cases/IESC/2006/S9.html

Case history
- Appealed from: Criminal Court of Appeal
- Appealed to: Supreme Court

Court membership
- Judges sitting: Geoghegan J. Fennelly J.McCracken J.Kearns J. Macken J.

Case opinions
- An "error or oversight of substance" must exhibited before a court would permit a new point to be raised on appeal.
- Decision by: Kearns J.

Keywords
- Crime and Sentencing Offences Against The Person Evidence

DPP v Cronin (No. 2) [2006] IESC 9; [2006] 4 IR 329; is an Irish Supreme Court case where an appeal under section 29 of the Courts of Justice Act 1924 was heard. The case dealt with a circumstance in which a new argument, not raised during the previous trial, was brought up during the appeal. The court rejected the appeal on the grounds that the trial judge had struck a balance between having due regard to the actual defense put forward and ensuring all relevant issues relating to the case were identified. The ruling also clarified that only points with a genuine substance (for example, missing evidence) can be taken into consideration.

== Background ==
At the trial for murder in 2004, the DPP argued that the defendant, Mr Mark Cronin, fired a gun intending to kill or seriously injure his wife at a Limerick nightclub. However, due to the gun being pushed away by his wife allegedly, another woman who was in attendance with her got shot and subsequently died. During the trial, the only defence that Mr Cronin put forward was that he did not have a gun with him at any point and so he did not fire any shots. He did not raise a defence of accidental firing at any point during the course of his trial either. In the Supreme Court, he argued that the trial judge should have mentioned this defence as a possibility to the jury.

== Holding of the Supreme Court ==
Mr Cronin was convicted of murder and possession of firearm with an intent to endanger life pursuant to section 15 of the Firearms and Offensive Weapons Act 1991. He asserted that the trial judge had an obligation to raise a defence of accidental killing even though he himself did not raise it during the trial. He argued that the judge should have told the jury about a possibility of there being an accidental shooting. The Court of Criminal Appeal expressed that the use of alternative defences will vary depending on the facts of each case. If an alternative defence is inconsistent with the other defences then the effect of such a defence will have little to no significance. Likewise, the Supreme Court, in agreeing with the Court of Criminal Appeal, concluded that counsel on behalf of Mr Cronin would have considered the defence of accidental killing. However, counsel deliberately did not rely on this as it would have been incompatible with Cronin's initial contention that he did not have a gun with him at any stage. Thus, using this alternative defence would have weakened his case.

The court expressed that a trial judge has a responsibility to ensure that the trial is fair to both a prosecution and a defence. However, a judge is not under an obligation to control the way a defendant argues his or her case. Nevertheless, the judge should direct a jury on the relevance of each defence put forward. The Supreme Court agreed that the trial judge had correctly addressed the jury on all the matters that he needed to address such as legal principles regarding intention. It was decided that the trial judge had in fact struck a correct balance between having due consideration to all the defences introduced by the defendant and ensuring that the jury knew about all relevant matters of the case before their verdict.

The Supreme Court dismissed the first ground of appeal which was that the trial judge had erred in his directions to the jury. The judge had said where there are two inferences which can be drawn, one favorable to the accused and one unfavorable to the accused, the obligation to draw an inference benefiting the accused will only arise when the two inferences are equal. The court noted that Mr Cronin could not contest this as his counsel had asked the judge to say this. The court also did not find any substance in any other claims that Mr Cronin brought up. Also, the Court of Criminal Appeal had refused his application on the grounds that an appellant should not be able to argue a new point unless it is for the sake of ensuring justice. However, in this case Mr Cronin did not propose a miscarriage of justice or that he was presented by an inexpert legal team. Moreover, the current argument arose after for a span of three years. He was also presented by a skilled legal team at all times so he cannot contend that his legal representatives lacked skills either. Furthermore, the court stated that appeals on new points will only be permitted if it is proven that an error had been made by the trial justice in such a way that it gave rise to a real risk of injustice. It must also be made clear why that error was made. It was expressed that an "error or oversight of substance" must exhibited before a court would permit a new point to be raised on appeal.

The court by applying this limitation to Mr Cronin's case dismissed the appeal. Moreover, the court settled that Mr Cronin could not seek to reverse his conviction on the basis of arguments which he deliberately did not raise in his trial. In addition, had the judge raised a defence in the manner suggested, there would be a further issue of the judge undermining Mr Cronin's initial defence that he did not have a gun with him. In essence, the judge would be saying that if Cronin fired the gun, then he may have done so accidentally which would make his offence manslaughter rather than murder. However, Mr Cronin's entire argument was that he did not commit an offence as he did not have a gun with him so now he cannot expect the judge to overturn that defence.

Therefore, the appeal was dismissed.

== Subsequent developments ==
This case was important as it changed the way the court will approach appeals on new points which were not raised at trial. A rule has been established from this case which restricts the circumstances in which a fresh point can be raised in the Court of Criminal Appeal. It must be acknowledged at the outset that the essence of the rule is not new but as will be argued its new formulation may lead to greater difficulties for practitioners.

== See also ==
- Supreme court
- Courts of Justice Act 1924
- Court of Criminal Appeal (Ireland)
