= P., L., & B. v Minister for Justice Equality and Law Reform =

Irish Supreme Court case

P. v. Minister for Justice Equality and Law Reform
- Coat of arms of Ireland
- Court: Supreme Court of Ireland
- Full case name: P. v. Minister for Justice Equality and Law Reform, L. v. Minister for Justice Equality and Law Reform and B. v. Minister for Justice Equality and law Reform and the Attorney General.
- Decided: 30 July 2001
- Citation: [2001] IESC 107; https://www.bailii.org/ie/cases/IESC/2001/107.html]

Case history
- Appealed from: High Court
- Appealed to: Supreme Court

Court membership
- Judges sitting: Keane C.J., Denham J., Murphy J., Murray J., Hardiman J.

Case opinions
- Decision by: Hardiman J.

Keywords
- Immigration | Deportation Orders | Grant to Appeal | Appeal | Constitution | Humanitarian leave

P., L., & B. v Minister for Justice Equality and Law Reform [2001] IESC 107, [2002] 1 ILRM 16 was an Irish Supreme Court case in which the Court ruled that refusal of an application for asylum may constitute a sufficient basis for the government to order the applicant's deportation.

== Background ==
All the applicants applied for asylum in the state and were refused. Each applicant appealed but was unsuccessful. The applicants then requested that the Minister for Justice exercise his discretion to allow them to remain in the state on a humanitarian basis pursuant to Section 3(3)(b) of the Immigration Act 1999. The issue of the constitutional status of non-nationals was examined by the Supreme Court in In the Matter of Article 26 of the Constitution and Section 5 and Section 10 of the Illegal Immigrants (Trafficking) Bill 1999 [2000] 2 IR 360, 382-86, where it was decided that the State had a legitimate interest in the control of aliens. The applicants argued that the Minister had failed to provide them with an intelligible description of his reasons for his decision to deport them.

== Holding of the Supreme Court ==
The Supreme Court judgment was delivered by Hardiman J. The judge considered the status of the applicants at the time they made their representation to the Minister and he noted that theirs was an ad misericordiam application. The applicant did not meet any requirement in regards to their humanitarian consideration. Hardiman J noted the case of Laurentiu v. Minister for Justice, where Geoghegan J. held that the Minister's advertence to the common good may suffice to explain why humanitarian considerations were insufficient preclude deportation. Hardiman J concluded that the Minister had been, "entitled to identify, as an aspect of [the common good], the maintenance of the integrity of the asylum and immigration systems". Accordingly, the Court decided to uphold the decision of the High Court to dismiss the applications for leave to seek judicial review of the Minister's deportation order on the basis of the insufficiency of such a reason.
