= Weir-Rodgers v SF Trust Ltd =

Irish supreme court case

- Coat of arms of Ireland
- Court: Supreme Court of Ireland
- Full case name: Geraldine Weir-Rodgers v SF Trust Ltd
- Decided: 21 January 2005
- Citation: [2005] IESC 2

Case history
- Appealed from: Judgment of Butler J (High Court)
- Related actions: Allow appeal and dismiss the action

Court membership
- Judges sitting: Murray CJ, Geoghegan J, Denham J.

Case opinions
- Decision by: Geoghegan J

Keywords
- Occupiers' Liability, Reckless Disregard, Trespasser, Recreational User

Weir-Rodgers v SF Trust Ltd [2005] IESC 2 is a reported decision of the Irish Supreme Court that confirmed that under Section 4 of the Occupiers Liability Act 1995 an occupier of land is not required to take all reasonable care to safeguard the person or property of either trespassers or recreational users.

== Background ==
A woman who had entered unused land adjoining the sea in order to witness a sunset sustained serious injuries after falling down a steep ridge leading to the beach. Seeking compensation for her injuries, the woman argued that the owners of the land had failed to discharge their duty of care under the Occupiers Liability Act 1995. The 1995 Act imposes obligations on occupiers in respect of the state of their premises in relation to three categories of entrant: visitor, recreational user and trespasser. Section 4 of the Act establishes the extent of the duty of care owed to recreational users and trespassers alike, namely, that the occupier must refrain from acting with ‘reckless disregard’. It was accepted in both the High Court and the Supreme Court that this was the defendants’ duty to the plaintiff. In the High Court, Butler J decided that the defendants were in breach of their statutory duty but found the plaintiff to be guilty of contributory negligence. The defendants appealed the High Court's finding of liability to the Supreme Court. The Supreme Court faced two primary questions: first, the degree of culpability necessary to trigger liability under Section 4; and, second, how to characterise the culpability, if any, that attached to the defendant's failure to erect a warning notice at the relevant location.

== Supreme Court Decision ==
Geoghegan J delivered the judgment of a unanimous Court. He held that, in enacting the 1995 Act, it was the intention of the Oireachtas to diminish the duty of care previously owed at common law to entrants meeting the statutory definitions of trespasser and recreational user:

I will begin my treatment of the law by quoting paragraph 12.16 of McMahon and Binchy, Law of Torts (3rd ed.) under the heading of “Occupiers Liability to Trespassers”. The learned authors say the following: “This branch of the law was drastically overhauled twenty five years ago in Ireland. After McNamara v. ESB was handed down by the Supreme Court in 1975, the duty owed to trespassers in Ireland was the duty to take reasonable care. The Occupiers Liability Act, 1995, however, has reversed this and has restored the old pre-McNamara common law standard, that is, that the duty owed to trespassers is not to injure them intentionally and not to act with reckless disregard (for) their person or property…”.

On enumerating the factors to which Section 4 (subsection 2) requires judges to attend in applying the prescribed standard of, ‘no reckless disregard’, Geoghegan J noted that these factors were equally applicable to the application of the higher standard of reasonable care, and, consequently, that her consideration of these factors might cause an unwary judge to overlook the fact that the former standard imposes a more onerous threshold on the plaintiff trespasser or recreational user. He speculated that this was, ‘exactly what happened in this case and that the learned trial judge unconsciously fell into this trap." Turning to address the meaning of, ‘reckless disregard’, Geoghegan J recalled Section 4's legislative history:

The [Law Reform] Commission rejected [the] advice [that the relevant duty should be an ordinary duty of reasonable care] and… recommended a threshold of “gross negligence”. The Oireachtas, however, did not adopt that expression in the legislation and instead went back to the old expression “reckless disregard”. It may well be reasonable to argue therefore that the threshold is even higher than “gross negligence."

Having confirmed that an occupier's Section 4 duty is less burdensome than the duty of reasonable care owed to those entrants meeting the statutory definition of visitor (and, in respect of her activitieson the premises, to all entrants) the Court proceeded to evaluate the culpability, if any, that attached to the defendant's failure to erect a warning sign at the relevant location. Referring to the series of Scottish judgments cited by Lord Hutton in the decision of the UK House of Lords in Tomlinson v Congleton Borough Council [2003] 3 All E.R. 1122, 1155, Geoghegan J endorsed the view that the law offers protection against only some of the risks that we face in ordinary life. Accordingly, he held that:

The person sitting down near a cliff… assumes the inherent risks associated therewith.

Applying this principle, Geoghegan J observed that the logical implication of considering the defendant culpable for their failure to erect a warning notice was an expectation that huge areas of coastline right around Ireland ought to be, ‘littered with warning notices’, a result which he characterized as, "extreme." He concluded that:

It is perfectly obvious to all users of land higher than sea level but adjoining the sea that there may well be a dangerous cliff edge and in those circumstances the occupier of the lands cannot be held to be unreasonable in not putting up a warning notice. Still less has he reckless disregard for the safety of the person using the land.

From the conclusion that the defendant's failure to put up a notice gave rise to no culpability whatever, it followed that the plaintiff would not have succeeded even if she had been subject to the less onerous threshold of showing merely that the defendant had not taken all reasonable care:

[E]ven if the duty on the occupier in this case was the ordinary Donoghue v Stevenson [1932] A.C. 562 neighbourly duty of care the respondent would not be entitled to succeed.
