= H.N. v Minister for Justice, Equality and Law Reform and others =

Irish Supreme Court case

H.N. v Minister for Justice Equality & Law Reform
- Coat of arms of Ireland
- Court: Supreme Court of Ireland
- Full case name: H.N. v Minister for Justice, Equality and Law Reform and others (also referred to as Nawaz v Minister for Justice, Equality and Law Reform and others)
- Citation: [2012] IESC 58

Case history
- Appealed from: High Court
- Appealed to: Supreme Court

Court membership
- Judges sitting: Fennelly J., O'Donnell J., McKechnie J., Clarke J., MacMenamin J.

Case opinions
- The Supreme Court referred for preliminary ruling of the CJEU a question with respect to Ireland's implementation of the Qualification Directive.

Keywords
- Asylum; Protection (Subsidiary); Protection Status; Refugee; Third-Country National

H.N. v Minister for Justice, Equality and Law Reform and others, [2012] IESC 58; [2013] 1 IR 142 (also referred to as Nawaz v Minister for Justice, Equality and Law Reform and others), is an Irish Supreme Court case in which the Court referred the following question to the Court of Justice of the European Union (the CJEU) for preliminary ruling in accordance with Article 267 Treaty on the Functioning of the European Union (TFEU):

Does Council Directive 2004/83/EC, interpreted in the light of the principle of good administration in the law of the European Union and, in particular, as provided by Article 41 of the Charter of Fundamental Rights of the European Union, permit a Member State, to provide in its law that an application for subsidiary protection status can be considered only if the applicant has applied for and been refused refugee status in accordance with national law?

== Background ==
The applicant was a Pakistani national. He arrived in Ireland in 2003 on a student visa. He married an Irish national and was granted permission to remain in the State until 2005. However, the marriage broke down. He was notified by the respondent Minister for Justice, Equality and Law Reform in 2006 that his permission to remain in the State would not be renewed. The marital breakdown also affected the applicant's legal entitlement in the State.

In 2006, the Minister notified the Applicant of his intention to make an order, pursuant to statutory powers, for his deportation; the Applicant then brought separate proceedings against the Minister and the State, claiming that the legislative provision for deportation was unconstitutional.

The applicant sought to apply for subsidiary protection (a status that allows someone who does not qualify as a refugee to stay in Ireland and be given many of the same rights as an Irish citizen) without first applying for refugee status. He did not at anytime apply for asylum in Ireland but explained that as he did not have a fear of persecution as stated by the Refugee Convention (race, religion, nationality, political opinion, or membership of a particular social group), therefore, he was not a refugee.

However, he claimed that he was still a victim of fear due to the indiscriminate violence in Pakistan, particularly in the Swat Valley where his family resided. He claimed that returning would amount to a risk of suffering serious harm within the meaning of Article 15(c) of the ‘Qualification Directive’ (Directive 2004/83/EC)(this Directive has subsequently been amended by Directive 2011/95/EU). In 2009, the Applicant made a request to the Minister to consider his subsidiary protection claim, believing that he is qualified for consideration pursuant to the Qualification Directive. He stated that there are "two million displaced homeless survivors of the Taliban Reign of Terror", which had been subjected to unrivaled acts of "barbarous savagery and inhuman cruelty" by their oppressors.

He further claimed that the European Communities (Eligibility for Protection) Regulations 2006 (the ’Protection Regulations, the Irish legislation giving effect to the Qualification Directive) was incompatible with and failed to properly transpose the Qualification Directive in requiring him to make an application for refugee status "that he knew to be false" before he could make an application for subsidiary protection.

On 23 June 2009, the Minister replied and stated that an application for subsidiary protection status was subject to the applicant being refused refugee status. Since there was no refugee application made by the applicant, a subsidiary protection application could not be considered.

== Issue before the Court ==
The issue before the Supreme Court was "whether the Qualification Directive requires Member States, in their implementing measures, to make it possible for a third country national to make an application for subsidiary protection status without making any application for refugee status". As was noted in the court, "Ireland is the only Member State of the European Union which has not adopted a single administrative procedure applying Council Directive 2005/85/EC on minimum standards on procedures in Member States for granting and withdrawing refugee status”. The question before the court focused on whether an applicant for subsidiary protection must first apply and be rejected for refugee status, before applying for subsidiary protection in order for his/her application to be considered.

== Holding of the Supreme Court ==
The Supreme Court held that in Irish law the applicant could not make an application for subsidiary protection without first applying for, and then being refused refugee status. As a result, the applicant needed to have a failed asylum seeker's status before he could proceed in making an application for subsidiary protection.

Based on the issue in question, on the implementation measures of the Qualification Directive requirement, the Supreme Court referred the following question to the CJEU for preliminary ruling in accordance with Article 267 TFEU:

Does Council Directive 2004/83/EC, interpreted in the light of the principle of good administration in the law of the European Union and, in particular, as provided for by Article 41 of the Charter of Fundamental Rights of the European Union, permit a Member State, to provide in its law that an application for subsidiary protection status can be considered only if the applicant has applied for and been refused refugee status in accordance with national law?

== Judgment of the European Court of Justice and subsequent developments ==
The European Court of Justice (ECJ) (Fourth Chamber) within the CJEU responded to the Supreme Court's question in the negative on 8 May 2014, noting that:

Council Directive 2004/83/EC of 29 April 2004 on minimum standards for the qualification of status of third country nationals or stateless persons as refugees or as persons who otherwise need international protection and the content of the protection granted, the principle of effectiveness and the right to good administration do not preclude a national procedural rule, such as that of issuing the main proceedings, under which an application for subsidiary protection may be considered only after an application for refugee status has been refused, provided that, first, it is possible to submit the application for refugee status and the application for subsidiary protection at the same time, and, second, the national procedural rule does not give rise to a situation which the application for subsidiary protection is considered only after an unreasonable length of time, which is a matter to be determined by the referring court.

The ECJ held that the Directive 2004/83 did not preclude a national procedural rule, which provided that an application for subsidiary protection needed to be made after a prior refusal of an application for refugee status. However, the national procedural rules applies provided that the application for refugee status and/or application for subsidiary protection are submitted at the same time (where applicable), and not in a situation where an application for subsidiary protection is considered after an unreasonable length of time.

The case returned to the Supreme Court. The court held that as the applicant had not made an application for refugee status, he count not argue that it was not possible to make a simultaneous application in 2009. Therefore, he had not established that the Regulation was not in compliance with the requirements of the Directive as set out by the ECJ. An award for damages was not considered for the applicant, as the delay was caused by the proceedings that the applicant himself commenced, and which failed in the consequence of those proceedings.

The Court dismissed the appeal.
