= Quinn Insurance Ltd v Price Waterhouse Cooper =

Irish Supreme Court case

Quinn Insurance Ltd v. Price Waterhouse Cooper
- Coat of arms of Ireland
- Court: Supreme Court of Ireland
- Full case name: Quinn Insurance Limited (Under Administration) v. Price Waterhouse Cooper (A Firm)
- Decided: 12 December 2017
- Citation: https://www.bailii.org/ie/cases/IESC/2017/S73.html

Case history
- Appealed from: Court of Appeal
- Appealed to: Supreme Court

Court membership
- Judges sitting: Clarke C.J., McKechnie J., MacMenamin J., Dunne J., Charleton J., O'Malley Iseult J

Case opinions
- Quinn Insurance sought damages from Price Waterhouse Cooper for losses allegedly caused by Price Waterhouse's failure to acknowledge their financial statements and returns. The High Court ordered Quinn Insurance to provide additional claim-related information. Price Waterhouse Cooper appealed the High Court's verdict to the Court of Appeal, which overturned the High Court's verdict. The Supreme Court granted leave to appeal to the Supreme Court, which ordered Quinn Insurance to submit Price Waterhouse Cooper with the necessary material. The Court of Appeal's order was overturned and the High Court's decision upheld.
- Decision by: O'Donnell J

Keywords
- Practice and Procedure, Appeals, Courts

Quinn Insurance Ltd v Price Waterhouse Cooper [2017] IESC 73; [2017] 3 I.R. 812, is a reported Irish Supreme Court case decision where an application for leave to appeal was granted. The Court had granted leave for appeal from the Court of Appeal to the Supreme Court being satisfied that the issue was a matter of public importance and in the greater interest of justice.

== Background ==
Quinn Insurance (under administration) was an insurance company that wanted to recover damages from Price Waterhouse Cooper (PwC), an audit firm, for losses that were allegedly caused by Price Waterhouse's failure to acknowledge that the financial statements and returns they had prepared did not accurately reflect the state of their affairs. Quinn Insurance asserted that both the contract and Price Waterhouse's obligation as an auditor were violated, constituting a breach of both the contract and the duty of care.

An order was sought by PwC directing Quinn Insurance to provide further information in respect to certain parts of their claim.

Quinn Insurance was ordered by the High Court (Ms. Justice Costello), which ruled in favour of Price Waterhouse, to produce more information and further details regarding certain of their claim-related issues.

Price Waterhouse Cooper cross-appealed against Quinn Insurance's failure to provide specific information while Quinn Insurance appealed the High Court's ruling to the Court of Appeal. "Viewing the matter both from the standpoint both of practice and existing authority it would be hard to see how requests of this kind could be accommodated within the ordinary parameters of a notice for particulars." The Court of Appeal's Hogan J. stated in overturning the High Court's decision.

== Holding of the Supreme Court ==
Price Waterhouse Cooper appealed to the Supreme Court by way of an application for leave to appeal. The Court (O' Donnell J) granted the application. The court considered submissions by both parties and the Constitutional provisions applicable and was satisfied that the issue was a matter of sufficient public importance and interest of justice as to warrant full hearing to clarify the point.

By filing an application for leave to appeal, Price Waterhouse Cooper appealed to the Supreme Court. The Court (O'Donnell J) granted the application after considering the arguments made by both parties and the relevant constitutional provisions. The court was satisfied that the issue was important enough to the public and important enough to the administration of justice to warrant a full hearing to address it.

All the Justices agreed with O' Donnell J.

The Supreme Court (O'Donnell J.) ruled that Quinn Insurance should be required to directly or indirectly provide Price Waterhouse Cooper with the information it requested. According to O'Donnell J, the core of the conflict between the parties was that it was difficult for this matter to be heard and decided without those fundamental concerns being addressed. The court decided to reverse the Court of Appeal's order and reinstated the High Court's decision.
