= Blood v DPP =

Irish Supreme Court case

- Coat of arms of Ireland
- Court: Supreme Court of Ireland
- Full case name: Blood v DPP
- Decided: 2 March 2005
- Citation: [2005] IESC 8

Case history
- Appealed from: Ó Caoimh J (High Court) 28 June 2002; 2001 182 JR

Court membership
- Judges sitting: Mc Guinness J, Hardiman J, Fennelly J.

Case opinions
- Decision by: Mc Guinness J.

Keywords
- Right to a fair trial; prosecutory delay; evidence of prejudice; right to expeditious trial; blameworthy prosecution delay

In Blood v DPP [2005] IESC 8, the Irish Supreme Court confirmed that a right to an expeditious trial is implied in the right to a fair trial under Irish law. The decision of McGuinness J further suggested that "blameworthy prosecution delay was insufficient without some evidence of prejudice to the accused, whether in the form of a real risk of an unfair trial or stress and anxiety arising from the delay". The applicant in the case was successful in their appeal.

== Background ==
In April 1994, Darren Bernard Blood was alleged to have been in possession a nine millimetre Mauser pistol and ammunition in circumstances giving rise to a reasonable inference that he did not possess the firearm for a lawful purpose. On 6 July 1999, Mr Blood was arrested and charged with firearms offences under section 27A(1) of the Firearms Act 1954, as inserted by section 8 of the Criminal Law (Jurisdiction) Act 1976 and amended by section 14 of the Criminal Justice Act 1984. As pointed out by Byrne, the charge "appeared to arise out of the investigation into an unlawful killing which occurred in 1994".

Mr Blood sought to prevent his prosecution for these offences on the grounds of prosecutorial delay. For example, it was put that the trial judge had "erred in law and in fact by failing to find that the delay on the part of the respondent in deciding to prosecute the applicant in 1994, 1995 and in 1996 was inexcusable and inordinate" and that the trial judge had "erred in law and in fact by failing to hold that the delay on the part of the respondent between 1994 and 1999 in directing the institution of a prosecution against the applicant constituted inordinate and excusable delay and thereby violated the applicant’s right to trial with due expedition in accordance with Article 38.1 of the Constitution of Ireland".

== Supreme Court ==
The Supreme Court distinguished delays in criminal trials involving allegations of child sexual abuse where the delay is not caused the action or inaction of the prosecuting authorities. As Mr Blood's complaint concerned prosecutorial delay, the Supreme Court considered the circumstances to be more comparable to cases such as the Director of Public Prosecutions v Byrne [1994] 2 IR 237.

Notably, McGuinness J stated that she would “accept that the applicant in the present case has not provided very strong evidence of specific prejudice resulting from the delay which has occurred in prosecuting the offences with which he has been charged.” However, McGuinness J found it relevant that the events connected with the alleged offences occurred in the context of a “motor bicycle fraternity” and that the applicant had “ceased to associate with any of that fraternity and has lost contact with any potential witnesses”. McGuinness J also acknowledged the stress caused by the impending proceedings and the related breakdown of the applicant's marriage. A further factor taken into account by McGuinness J was that when initially under investigation in 1994-1996, the investigation concerned a charge of murder – a much more serious offence than that subsequently brought. McGuinness J found that the “right to an expeditious trial is implied in the right to a fair trial. There is a danger that a lengthy delay in itself will, through its effect on the memory of potential witnesses and of the accused person himself, render a trial unfair. … In the case of the applicant his loss of contact with his motor cycling associates, together with his anxiety and concern at the impending proceedings against him and the fact that he has now been charged with a less serious offence must be added factors.”

As assessments of whether the right to an expeditious trial has been granted must be made on an ad hoc basis, McGuinness J concluded that taken as a whole, "the delays in the latter period of the prosecution of the applicant amount to a denial of his right to an expeditious trial. There is also a real risk that this may lead to an unfair trial.”
