= Lobe v Minister for Justice, Equality and Law Reform =

Irish Supreme Court case

Lobe v. Minister for Justice, Equality and Law Reform
- Coat of arms of Ireland
- Court: Supreme Court of Ireland
- Decided: January 23, 2003
- Citation: [2003] IESC 3

Court membership
- Judges sitting: Keane C.J., Denham J., Murray J., McGuinness J., Hardiman J., Geoghegan J., and Fennelly J.

Case opinions
- Decision by: Keane C.J.

Keywords
- Asylum, Constitution, Citizenship

Lobe v Minister for Justice, Equality and Law Reform [2003] IESC 3 was an Irish Supreme Court case in which the Court found that the applicant minors enjoy, in general terms, the right not to be expelled form the state—a right subject to limited qualification (such as lawful extradition to another state). Furthermore, the court found that applicant minors enjoy a constitutional right to be in the care and company of other family members, including their siblings in the state. The consequences of this ruling were significant in that it prohibits the state from deporting the parents and other family members of minors who are applying for asylum until the process is resolved. The case established the "primacy" of the family unit. However, the ruling also resulted in the finding that an Irish citizen who is a minor could, nevertheless, be deported if their non-national parents were deported.

== Background ==
The applicants in two separate proceedings joined for appeal purposes. They sought leave to apply by way of judicial review for an order quashing the relevant deportation order. In each case, the Court was asked to determine whether, as minor children and Irish citizens the applicants were entitled to the company, care, and parentage of their parents in the state, thus prohibiting the minister from deporting their non-national parents, and other family members. In essence the court had to evaluate which of the two constitutional principles must prevailed: the inalienable rights of Irish citizenship (in this case, the minors) versus the sovereign right of the state to control immigration and asylum.

In the first appeal, the applicant and family were Nigerian nationals who arrived in Ireland May 2001. During the course of his asylum application, this applicant denied having previously resided anywhere except Nigeria or having claimed asylum anywhere except Ireland; in fact, prior UK asylum had been refused. He was ordered to be deported from Ireland. In the second appeal, a child was born while deportation proceedings were underway. The minister refused the asylum application, and ordered deportation. If valid, two children legally in Ireland as of right would be separated from their deported families, if the children remained in Ireland.

The court referred to prior judgements based on the European Convention on Human Rights jurisprudence (including cases like Mahmood), which found that fundamental Convention family rights nevertheless in some instances yield "to the right of the state to control the entry of non-nationals into its territory." In this case, the court found that the applicant minors enjoy in general terms, the right not to be expelled from the state. Of the extensive case law canvassed by the court (over 300 paragraphs are devoted to assessing various authorities), the court placed emphasis on extracts from (M) v Attorney General. It is technically correct to conclude that an infant child has citizenship rights that they can enforce at law, but the child's best interest, and their overall welfare require adult care. For example, parents may lawfully make decisions affecting their child so long as these are consistent with the child's best interest. It is noted that the court majority upholds the 1990 Fajujonu v Minister for Justice reasoning as sound, but not applicable (the three Irish born children in that case had lived in Ireland for an "appreciable period").

== Holding of the Supreme Court ==
The majority concluded that in these particular circumstances, the child does not have "...right of the society of its parents in the state," meaning that an Irish citizen child's parents (who are not citizens) may be deported, even if this means the child is essentially deported also. The minority (Fennelly J) would have allowed the appeals, giving priority to the child over State interests.

== Subsequent developments ==
This case remains an influential study, given the ways in which the court seeks to resolve the inherent supremacy conflict between individual citizenship, and powers of the state. These cases are inherently circumstantial when assessing possible outcomes.
