= Y.Y. v Minister for Justice and Equality =

Irish Supreme Court case

- Coat of arms of Ireland
- Court: Supreme Court of Ireland
- Full case name: Y.Y. v Minister for Justice and Equality
- Decided: 27 July 2017
- Citation: [2017] IESC 61
- Transcript: https://www.bailii.org/ie/cases/IESC/2017/S61.html

Case history
- Appealed from: High Court
- Appealed to: Supreme Court

Court membership
- Judges sitting: Denham C.J., O'Donnell Donal J., MacMenamin J., Dunne J., O'Malley Iseult J.

Case opinions
- The Supreme Court held that Article 3 of the European Convention on Human Rights which prohibits torture, inhuman or degrading treatment was absolute and that the Minister for Justice and Equality should consider this possibility when making a deportation order in this case.
- Decision by: O’Donnell D

Keywords
- Deportation, Deportation Order, European Convention on Human Rights (ECHR), Refoulement (Non-)

Y.Y. v Minister for Justice and Equality [2017] IESC 61 is an Irish Supreme Court case which concerned the deportation of "Y.Y.", who was an Algerian national. Y.Y. was facing deportation from Ireland to his native country, where he was sentenced in absentia to three life sentences and two death sentences for terrorism related offences. Y.Y. appealed to the Supreme Court against a High Court decision that dismissed his challenge to a deportation order made by The Minister for Justice and Equality under the Immigration Act 1999. He argued that if he were deported to Algeria, he would be under a real threat of torture, inhuman or degrading treatment. Thus, deporting him would go against Article 3 of the European Convention on Human Rights (ECHR).

The Supreme Court held that Article 3 of the ECHR which prohibits torture, inhuman or degrading treatment was absolute and that the Minister must consider this possibility when making a deportation order in this case. The court decided that the matter must be sent back to the Minister for further consideration. The court extended the deportation order for 7 days and held that if an application to set aside the court's decision was made on the basis of inadequate reasons, the stay would last for a further 14 days.

== Background ==
Y.Y. arrived in Ireland in 1997 to apply for asylum but the Refugee Applications Commissioner rejected this application. However in 2000, he was granted refugee status since he was able to appeal this judgment to the Refugee Appeals Tribunal. He was successful in appealing this judgement to the Refugee Appeals Tribunal, as they were misled by misrepresentations made by Y.Y. and thus he was granted refugee status.

Notably, in his native country Y.Y. was given three sentences of life in prison and two of death for terrorism related offences in absentia due to the following:

(i) Creating an armed terrorist organisation on May 16, 1996, with the intent to commit murder and sabotage, as well as premeditated murder, attempted assignation, arson, and theft;

(ii) on December 23, 1996, for the offences of premeditated murder, creating a terrorist organisation with the intent to impair national security and the government, and possession of weapons of war;

(iii) on September 21, 1997, for organising an armed terrorist organisation, planning a murder with intent to kill, aiding an armed terrorist group, and failing to report;

(iv) on November 8th, 1997, for organising an armed terrorist organisation, planning a murder with intent to kill, aiding an armed terrorist group, and failing to report;

(v) on November 18, 1997, for organising an armed terrorist organisation with the goal of jeopardising national security and premeditated murder.

On the 2nd of April 2005, Y.Y. was given an 8 year jail sentence in France for multiple serious offences which included acts of terrorism and preparing for terrorism, as well as membership in criminal organisations across many different jurisdictions such as England, Andorra, France, Spain, and Ireland. Upon release from prison in 2009, Y.Y. was refused refugee status by the French authorities. In Ireland, the Irish authorities revoked Y.Y.'s refugee status on the grounds that the applicant had provided false information to the authorities in Ireland.

It is stated that in 2009, Y.Y. re-entered the State (unlawfully), filed an application for refugee status for the second time under Section 17(7) of the Refugee Act 1996. He also applied for a 'Leave to Remain' pursuant to section 3 of the Immigration Act 1999 and the Subsidiary Protection Directive 2004/83/EC. The application was rejected as all the above sections were taken into consideration.

== Holding of the Supreme Court ==
The five judges unanimously passed the judgment and acknowledged that Article 3 of the ECHR was absolute. Justice O’Donnell stated the uniqueness or difficulties of the case and considered that deporting the appellant would pose a threat to the national security of the state. In his judgment, O’Donnell J further stated that the argument or reasoning presented by the Minister of Justice was not sufficient and satisfactory enough to allow the deportation of Y.Y. as the Minister was not fully updated with information of the appellant’s country of origin.

The judge stated that no real evidence was present to support that if Y.Y. was deported to Algeria, he was not going to face danger, threats, or a real risk of human degrading or torture treatment, and also that there was not enough reasonable assurance from the Minister for Justice about the issue. The Supreme Court went on to state the guarantees under Article 3 of the European Convention. Justice O'Donnell stated that the court handled the original decision under Section (1) and the revocation decision under Section 3(11) as part of one procedure to decide whether or not the reasons given are good enough. Therefore, the onus was now on the Minister of Justice and Equality to decide, in the light of current information, whether there is or is not a real risk on solid grounds of treatment being forbidden by Article 3 including both section 3(1) and section 3(11) stages. The Judges agreed to overturn the Minister's letter-communicated deportation order, which was taken on December 6, 2016, but they refused to overturn the decision made under Section 3(11) of the Immigration Act of 1999. This meant that the question of revocation had to be addressed again. Therefore, the Minister for Justice and Equality was ordered to come to a decision based on the most recent information about the situation, as there was no reason why that should not happen quickly.

In addition, Justice O'Donnell continued to say that the court would remit the High Court list, and if the Minister refused to revoke it by giving enough reasons as to why and there was no challenge, the trial would be ended and dismissed subject to any costs. However, if Y.Y. wanted to challenge the decision by reference of Article 3, he would have mto do that within 7 days, and if Y.Y succeeds, the deportation order will be quashed. In concluding, the Supreme Court extended the deportation order for 7 days and held that if an application to set aside the court's decision during that time period was made on the basis that there were any alleged inadequate reasons, the stay would last for a further 14 days until the outcome of the High Court proceedings.

The court quashed the Minister’s decision to not cancel the deportation order in respect of the Y.Y. and sent back the proceedings to the High Court for further management depending on the outcome of any renewed application under section 3(11) of the Immigration Act 1999, so that any new or renewed claim could be tried in these procedures.
