= Hickey v McGowan =

Irish Supreme Court case

Hickey -v- McGowan & ors
- Coat of arms of Ireland
- Court: Supreme Court of Ireland
- Full case name: Pádraig Hickey (Plaintiff) AND Patrick Joseph McGowan and Christopher Cosgrove (Defendant)
- Decided: 9 February 2017
- Citation: [2017] IESC 6;

Case history
- Appealed from: High Court
- Appealed to: Supreme Court

Court membership
- Judges sitting: Denham C.J., O'Donnell Donal J., MacMenamin J., Dunne J., Charleton J.

Case opinions
- The High Court judge O'Néill J. awarded general damages of €350,000 to a Sligo-born candidate attending St. John's National School for four years. The Supreme Court applied the "Close Connection test" to determine if the first defendant was accountable for the second defendant's behaviour. The plaintiff had no recall of the occurrence until alerting the Gardai due to shock. The High Court found the first defendant guilty of sexual abuse, and the defence accused the first defendant unrepresented. The appeal agreed that the Marist Brothers were not a legal entity, and Heatons Transport Ltd. v. TGWU addressed a union's accountability for a union officer. O'Donnell J. argued for €150,000 damages split evenly, but the judgment held the first defendant further responsible.
- Decision by: O’Donnell J
- Concurrence: Denham C.J., MacMenamin J., Dunne J.,
- Dissent: Charleton J.

Keywords
- Sexual Abuse of Children | Vicarious liability | Statute of Limitation | Appeal | Constitution | Unincorporated Association

Hickey v McGowan & ors, [2017] IESC 6 is a reported Irish Supreme Court case decision. This case concerns child abuse and vicarious liability. The second defendant sexually abused the plaintiff in class, in the presence of the other students. This happened at least once a week. Four boys who witnessed the abuse in the class gave evidence, which was accepted by the High Court. It was determined that there must be a "close connection" between the wrongful act and the actions that one had engaged the offender to perform in order for one to be made liable for the act of another.

== Background ==
The applicant in this case was born in Sligo, where he attended St John's National School for four years. The first named defendant was the Provincial of the Marist Brothers. The second defendant was his teacher for three years, who was also a member of the Marist Brothers. Over 60 pupils were in the class.

Due to his shock, the trial judge accepted that the plaintiff had no recollection of the incident before notifying the Gardai. The High Court judge O'Néill J. determined general damages to be €350,000, but the court's problem on appeal was based on the first defendant's liability, which was based on the second defendant's acts that caused plaintiff harm. The court must look at the defendants' legal standing as well as the second listed defendant's position within the school in order to take this into account. In the case of O'Keeffe v. Hickey, the parish relinquished its legal responsibility for overseeing the operation of the school. The school was managed by the Marist Order. Because the principal and teachers are both Marist Brothers, the trial judge declared the school to be a Marist institution.

The trial judge came to the conclusion that the Marist Brothers were fully in charge of the school's daily management. To apply both legal analysis and fill in the providential gaps, the trial judge based his decision on the UK Supreme Court's ruling in the Catholic Child Welfare Society and Ors. v. Various Claimants (FC) and Ors. ("CCWS") The plaintiff did not file a lawsuit against the management, but under s. 35(1), if one defendant caused the plaintiff significant harm, both defendants would be legally precluded from further action. However, the High Court judge found that the management bore only 10% of the blame. Regarding the employer-employee issue, the degree of the link between the two defendants was questioned. It was decided that a religious organisation could be made liable for any vicarious actions by a member of the order.

== The holding of the Supreme Court ==
O'Donnell Donal J. handed down the judgement decision, which was concurred by Denham C.J., MacMenamin J. and Dunne J., and Charleton J. handed down a dissenting opinion.

To decide whether the first defendant was responsible for the second defendant's behavior, the Supreme Court used the "Close Connection test". The close relationship test must be used to portray Irish law, and it appears obvious that test was satisfied in this case, according to the majority of the judgment: "the close connection test must be taken to represent the law in Ireland…it seems clear that that test was satisfied in this case. The abuse took place during the very act of teaching in the classroom". The judges determined that the first defendant's responsibility also included sexual abuse. In the case of Mohamud v. WM Morrison Supermarkets plc, it was decided that a company was responsible for an employee's aggressive treatment of a client. Even if the rugby players had punched each other, it was decided in Gravill v. Carroll that the rugby employer was nevertheless found liable. In Wallbank v. Wallbank Fox Designs, it was determined that even if the employee assaulted his boss, the employer was still found liable because the incident was closely associated to the occupation.

A religious order that had been incorporated was the subject of this case. Religious orders are a collection of organisations without a distinct legal existence. The Marist brothers and the young boys were not meant to be sexually attracted to one another. The High Court determined that defendant one was accountable for defendant two's behaviour. The defence then began accusing the first defendant without any legal representation. This association is not accountable for any crimes its members may commit because it is not incorporated. In Hay v. O'Grady, McCarthy J. argued that rather than weighing conflicting evidence, the court should decide based on the law and the facts. The facts of Doyle v. Banville and the court's decision there show that the second defendant was the target of the supporting credential evidence in this case. The first defendant's vicarious liability was not supported by any evidence, and there was no proof that the school's principal was bound by an official employment contract. Both sides of the appeal concurred that The Marist Brothers were not a recognised legal body.

This case differs from the CCWS case in that the CCWS brother had a legal entity with cooperative qualities, as opposed to the Marist Brothers who were composed of legal bodies. Despite the trust that supported the Marist brothers, the order is an unincorporated association, which means that it lacks a separate legal personality, as demonstrated in Conservative and Unionist Central Office v. Burrell. The Marist Brothers have characteristics of both an incorporated and unincorporated group, which is the problem in this case. The issue at hand in Heatons Transport Ltd. v. TGWU was a union's responsibility for the activities of a union official. Liability only exists based on the continuation of responsibility.

O'Donnell J. gave grounds for the damages being reduced to €150,000 and that they should be split equally. O'Donnell J. went beyond the context of employment. According to the ruling, the first defendant was additionally accountable.
