= Director of Public Prosecutions v Pat Hegarty =

Irish Supreme Court case

- Coat of arms of Ireland
- Court: Supreme Court of Ireland
- Full case name: Director of Public Prosecutions v Pat Hegarty
- Citation: DPP v Pat Hegarty [2011] IESC 32

Court membership
- Judges sitting: Murray C.J., O'Donnell J., McKechnie J

Keywords
- Criminal Law; Anticompetitive Practice

Director of Public Prosecutions v Pat Hegarty is an Irish Supreme Court case in which the court confirmed that officers/key employees of undertakings involved in anti-competitive practices in Ireland may be prosecuted and convicted for their involvement, regardless of whether the undertaking itself has been prosecuted.

== Background ==
The accused (Pat Hegarty) in this case was the manager of an oil company (Fate Park Ltd). Hegarty was charged with two charges under section 3(4)(a) of the Competition (Amendment) Act 1996 (the "1996 Act"). Section 3(4)(a) of the 1996 Act provided that:

"Where an offence under section 2 of this Act has been committed by an undertaking and the doing of the acts that constituted the offence has been authorised, or consented to, by a person, being a director, manager, or other similar officer of the undertaking, or a person who purports to act in any such capacity, that person as well as the undertaking shall be guilty of an offence and shall be liable to be proceeded against and punished as if he or she were guilty of the first-mentioned offence."

Hegarty's legal counsel sought to have the charges rejected as invalid on the basis that in order for Hegarty to be found guilty, Fate Park Ltd must first have committed the crime of price fixing under section 2 Competition Act 1991. The Director of Public Prosecutions (the "DPP") accepted "the contingency as an ingredient of the offence", but argued that Fate Park Ltd's having engaged in price fixing could be shown without the need for a formal conviction. In the Circuit Court, Judge Groarke rejected the DPP's argument. However, the judge agreed to raise two questions with the Supreme Court:

"Where an individual is prosecuted pursuant to s. 3(4)(a) of the Competition Act 1996:

(a) whether an adjudication as to whether the relevant undertaking has committed an offence can be undertaken when no prosecution has been initiated against the undertaking, and

(b) whether it is necessary that the undertaking be convicted of the offence before the individual can be convicted."

== Holding of the Supreme Court ==
McKechnie J delivered the only written judgment for the Supreme Court (with which the other judges agreed).

The Supreme Court noted that pursuant to section 3(4)(a) 1996 Act, "where an offence under s. 2 of this Act has been committed by an undertaking…” and the acts that constituted the offence in question were "authorised, or consented to, by a person, being a director, manager, or other similar officer of the undertaking, or a person who purports to act in any such capacity", that person will be guilty of an offence and prosecuted as if he / she was guilty of the section 2 1996 Act offence. The court went on to note that as section 3(4)(a) 1996 Act created a criminal offence, it had to be "strictly construed". The court noted, however that "[t]hat provision ... must be viewed and its true meaning ascertained by reference to its immediate context, properly derived from the scheme of the Act, or more accurately from that part of the Act which criminalised behaviour previously not so declared." Examining the wording of the 1996 Act, therefore, the court concluded that the undertaking referred to in section 3(4)(a) 1996 Act must have committed a section 2 offence, but that such undertaking did not have to have been convicted of such an offence in order for an individual referred to in section 3(4)(a) 1996 Act to be found guilty of the offence. As the court noted: “[t]here is no reference to a conviction and in my view there is no interpretative basis for importing into the provision such a condition”. It was, therefore, an essential ingredient of the offence relating to the individual that the undertaking itself must have been found to have committed the offence, but this could be established on the facts by the jury during the trial for the prosecution of the individual. McKechnie J. noted that the employer undertaking itself would, if subsequently tried, be entitled to all appropriate rights and safeguards and could challenge any evidence, including that relied upon to support any finding in the earlier proceedings.

In consequence, the court answered the questions posed in the case stated as follows: (a) yes; (b) no.

Following the Supreme Court decision, the case returned the Circuit Court. Here, Mr Hegarty was convicted by a unanimous jury verdict. He was fined €30,000 and handed a (suspended) two-year sentence.

DPP v Hegarty formulated the definition of “director, manager or other similar officer”, with strict employment of the terms “director, manager or other similar officer” with little guidance offered on the definition of “manager or other similar officer”.
