= Roche (Also Known as Dumbrell) v Governor of Cloverhill Prison =

Supreme Court of Ireland case

Roche (also known as Dumbrell) v Governor of Cloverhill Prison
- Roche (also known as Dumbrell) v Governor of Cloverhill Prison
- Court: Supreme Court of Ireland
- Decided: 31 July 2014
- Citation: [2014] IESC 53

Court membership
- Judges sitting: Charleton J, O'Donnell J, MacMenamin J

Case opinions
- Held that the Bail Act 1997 was not a complete code on the law concerning bail, as the courts have a common law power to revoke bail where necessary
- Decision by: Charleton J

Keywords
- Bail | Conditions | Variation | Breach | Revocation | Constitutional Law | Article 40 | Bail Act 1997

Roche (also known as Dumbrell) v Governor of Cloverhill Prison, [2014] IESC 53, is an Irish Supreme Court case in which the Court held that the Bail Act 1997 is not a code providing an exhaustive statement regarding the law on bail. The Act did not "replace the full and original jurisdiction of the High Court" concerning bail, nor should it be deemed to replace the jurisdiction of the Court handling the particular criminal offence.

Rather, the 1997 Act provided new statutory grounds for the refusal of bail and amended the existing law concerning bail. Thus, Courts still retain their common law powers to grant and revoke bail, which exists in along with the powers granted to it by the Bail Act 1997.

== Background ==
The defendant, Mr Roche, was arrested and charged with violent disorder in November, 2013. He applied for bail in the District Court; this bail application was refused and he was remanded in custody. He was then granted bail in the High Court in December, 2013, which was subject to certain conditions. These conditions included residing at a particular address, complying with a curfew, signing on at a named Garda station every day and having no contact with his co-accused. His bail was revoked 3 months later after he failed to abide by these conditions.

Mr Roche managed to obtain bail again. These conditions were relaxed enough which allowed him to go to Portugal for a holiday. However, his bail was revoked yet again as he returned to Ireland earlier than expected and failed to return his passport to Kilmainham Jail. He also failed to reside at an agreed address. The Gardaí subsequently applied for an arrest warrant.

Mr Roche challenged this, claiming that he had not breached the conditions of his bail, as the alleged breaches had taken place during the time when his conditions were temporarily relaxed. The presiding judge held the bail conditions were breached in relation to residence, which resulted in him waiving his passport and curfew.

== Holding of the High Court ==
Mac Eochaidh J acknowledged that if the conditions of bail were ambiguous, any confusion should be resolved in favour of the accused. Despite this acknowledgement, he found nothing ambiguous in Mr Roche's bail conditions. There was a specific time frame during which, the bail conditions were relaxed and Mr Roche did return earlier than expected. However, upon arrival, he did not inform the Gardaí that he arrived home. Notably, he did not return to the home he was supposed to reside in. The breaches of these conditions may be considered intentional, as Mr Roche had not put forward any information regarding the breach and did not provide reasons justifying the decision of breaching the bail conditions.

Mac Eochaidh J did not accept the applicant's argument that the Bail Act 1997 was a strict code. He found that, through common law, the Court had been given the power of revocation which it could invoke.

== Holding of the Supreme Court ==
Mr Roche brought proceedings pursuant to Article 40 of the Constitution in order to be released from custody immediately. He argued that the Bail Act 1997 was a complete code for courts when dealing with bail matters and completely excluded any jurisdiction in the Circuit Court to revoke bail.

The judgment of the Supreme Court was given by Charleton J, who held that the 1997 Act is not a code providing an exhaustive statement of the law on bail. He added that it was an unnecessary addition, as at common law, there is no limitation on an accused person to apply to the relevant court of trial or to the High Court for bail, except in situations where there is a "relevant and appropriately probative change of circumstances where repeated calls on that jurisdiction are made". The Court stated that the High Court is a full jurisdiction and may be called on in any matter relating to bail, by either the accused person or by the prosecution. The case of People (Attorney General) v O'Callaghan was relied upon to solidify the fact that courts have the common law power to revoke bail and that there is not a statutory basis for this power.

The Court considered the question of whether the revocation of bail was a breach of the applicant's constitutional rights under Article 40. The applicant was particularly silent as to why he had not justified his reasons for breaching the bail conditions. The Court relied on the case of The State (McDonagh) v Frawley, which held that the right a citizen has to not be deprived of liberty, save in "accordance with law", does not mean a convicted person is required to be released on habeas corpus grounds merely because a defect or illegality is attached to the detention. Charleton J stated that this case was not a matter for remedy under Article 40.4.2.

The appeal was dismissed and the order of the High Court judge was affirmed.

== Subsequent developments ==
This case was applied in Corcoran v Governor of Castlerea Prison [2016] IEHC 267.
