= Gough v Neary =

Irish Supreme Court case

Gough v Neary & Cronin
- Coat of arms of Ireland
- Court: Supreme Court of Ireland
- Full case name: Alison Gough and Michael Neary and Basil Cronin
- Decided: 3 July 2003
- Citation: [2003] 3 IR 92; [2003] IESC 39; [2004] 1 ILRM 35
- Transcript: https://www.bailii.org/ie/cases/IESC/2003/39.html

Case history
- Appealed from: High Court
- Appealed to: Supreme Court

Court membership
- Judges sitting: Hardiman J, Geohgean J, McCracken J.

Case opinions
- Claim for personal injury was not statute barred.
- Decision by: Justice Hardiman, Justice Geoghegan, Justice McCracken.
- Concurrence: 2 concur
- Concur/dissent: 1 dissent
- Dissent: Justice Hardiman.

Keywords
- Medical Negligence Unnecessary Statute Barred Damages

Gough v Neary & Cronin [2003] IESC 39; [2003] IR 92; [2004] 1 ILRM 35 is an Irish Supreme Court case in which the court ruled that a claim against a gynecologist for performing an unnecessary hysterectomy was no longer legally enforceable owing to a prescribed period of limitation having lapsed under the Statute of Limitations (Amendment) Act 1991. However, the claim could still be brought under tort; this case highlighted that the three year limit for personal injury starts when the individual realizes the injury was due to negligence, rather than the date of the occurrence of the injury. Thus, the period that a person could file a claim was, in practical terms, extended.

== Background ==
=== Facts of the case ===
On 27 October 1992, the appellant, Ms Alison Gough, received an emergency hysterectomy at the hands of Dr. Michael Neary after the birth of her son through C-section. Evidence provided that this procedure was unnecessary, given the circumstances. Ms Gough instituted proceedings six years later on the 21st of December 1998 after hearing various media reports that there was a local consultant in trouble of some unspecified sort and later in the year, reading reports dealing with other patients of the defendants hospital in the same situation. She claimed that in addition to the procedure being performed unnecessarily, alternative treatments available were either not attempted or attempted inadequately.

There were two named defendants in the case, Dr Michael Neary, the obstetrician and gynecologist who performed the C-section and subsequent hysterectomy and Basil Cronin, a trustee of the Our Lady of Lourdes National Hospital in Drogheda, where the event took place. The main defense pleaded was that the proceedings should be statute barred based on the three year time limit contained within the Statute of Limitations Act, 1957.

=== History in lower courts ===
Johnson J heard Ms Gough's case in the High Court on in April and May 2002. Subsequently, the judgement was released on the 15th of November 2002, finding in favor of the Ms Gough. Judge Johnson gave an ex-tempore judgement at the end of the evidence hearing on the 23rd of April in relation to the Statute of Limitations. Both of the defendant's defense claims were ruled against, with Ms Gough being awarded €273,223.27 in damages. The damages were calculated as €150,000 for pain and suffering to date and €100,000 for future pain and suffering.

On the 18th of December 2002, the defendants filed an appeal against the decision which was limited to the defense under the Statute of Limitations and the award handed down by the High Court.

=== Appeal argument ===
The main argument of the appeal to the Supreme Court rested on the three-year time limit contained within the Statute of Limitations 1957 with regards to bringing a personal injury claim. However, Miss Gough relied on the terms of the Statute of Limitations (Amendment) Act, 1991 and in particular on section 2(1). This piece of legislation provides that it is not the date of occurrence of the injury which kick-starts the time limit but rather the date of knowledge of various circumstances such as being aware that "the injury was attributable in whole or in part to the act or omission which is alleged to constitute negligence, nuisance or breach of duty" and "knowledge that any acts or omissions did or did not, as a matter of law, involve negligence, nuisance or breach of duty is irrelevant."

== Holding of the Supreme Court ==
Hardiman J, Geoghegan J, and McCracken J resided over the appeal to the Supreme Court.

=== Judgement of Hardiman J ===
Hardiman J provided that a more suitable argument would have been to rely on section 71 of the original 1957 Act, which provides an exception to the three year time limit on bringing a claim of personal injury where fraud or "equitable negligence" can be proved.

Given that instead Ms Gough relied on the amended version of the Act, Hardiman J conducted an analysis of English precedent, specifically the case of Dobbie v. Medway Health Authority to attain whether the time limit set out in section 2(1) of the amended act began to run when knowledge was attained that the injury was unnecessary or negligent.

Hardiman provided that there was a difference between finding out that the procedure was unnecessary and finding out that the procedure was negligent. The judge argued that section 2(1) of the amended 1991 Act provided that knowledge of negligence was irrelevant, as was knowledge that the procedure was unnecessary, what was relevant was the injured persons knowledge that "the injury was attributable in whole or in part to the act or omission which is alleged to constitute negligence…". Hardiman J came to the conclusion that section 2(1) does not extend to circumstances where some aspect of the complained impairment had been concealed or had been due to negligence. According to the learned judge such instances are covered under section 71 of the 1957 Act. The Judge concluded by providing that whether the Ms Gough recovered under section 2(1) of the 1991 Amendment Act or under section 71 of the 1957 Act was a substantially important question and not just one of technicality. For these reasons, the judge provided that he would allow the appeal and set aside the order of the High Court on the basis that the claim was statute barred.

=== Dissent of Justice Geoghegan ===
Geoghegan J issued a judgement in dissent of Hardiman J's view. Justice Geoghegan argued that the English legislation while similar in wording to the Irish legislation, is of a different meaning. Therefore, the judge provided that it would be "unsafe" to attach such significance to English case law. The judge conducted an application of the meaning of the word 'knowledge' contained within section 3 and section 2 of the 1991 (Amendment) Act. During this application Geoghegan J conducts a review of some of the English case law relied upon. In doing so, concluding that the relevant "knowledge" in this case included firstly, knowledge that the operation was unnecessary and secondly, that knowledge did not exist more than three years before the commencement of the action. Thus, Geoghegan ruled that the plea of statute bar must fail and he went on to dismiss the appeal.

The Second portion of Geoghegan J's judgement deals with the amount of damages awarded. The appellant, Dr. Neary had submitted that the award of €250,000 for damages was excessive and that the court should intervene. The Judge applied a proportionality test to arrive at a figure for damages, providing that an award of €250,000 for general damages was disproportionately high. Justice Geoghegan reduced the award for general damages from €250,000 to €200,000 with the already established special damages amount remaining at €23,223.27, awarding Ms Gough a total of €223,223.27.

=== Judgement of McCracken J ===
Justice McCracken had the shortest out of the three judgments of the Supreme Court in this case. Upon a reading of both Hardiman J and Geoghegan J's prior judgments, McCracken J allowed the appeal, affirming that Ms Gough's claim is not statute barred under the 1991 Act.

In line with Justice Geoghegan, McCracken also reduced the sum of damages by €50,000.

=== Ruling ===
By a majority of 2-1, the court ruled that Allison Gough's claim was not statute barred and she was awarded €200,000 in general damages and €23,223.27 in special damages.

== Subsequent developments ==
Following the judgement of the case, approximately 35 women who experienced the same procedure at the hands of Dr. Neary were promised compensation for their suffering.
