= P.F v G.O'M (Otherwise G.F) =

Irish Supreme Court case

- Grounds of nullity of marriage
- Court: Supreme Court of Ireland
- Decided: 28/11/2000
- Citation: [2000] IESC 81

Case history
- Appealed from: High Court
- Appealed to: Supreme Court

Court membership
- Judges sitting: HC- O'Higgins, J SC- McGuinness J,

Case opinions
- Decision by: Mrs. Justice McGuinness
- Concurrence: Murray J., Geoghegan J.
- Concur/dissent: Mrs. Justice McGuinness
- Dissent: Mrs. Justice McGuinness

Keywords
- family law

P.F v G.O'M (Otherwise G.F) [2000] IESC 81 is an Irish Supreme Court case concerning the grounds of nullity of marriage. The court believe that adultery is not a reason for nullity of the marriage but did serve as a basis for legal separation. The court ruled that "consent" was not undermined where a party to the marriage had concealed misconduct. This case is thus significant for establishing the principles for annulment and clarifying the nature of consent.

== Background ==
The case concerned a request for annulment of marriage. The petitioner claimed that the other party in the marriage had been in another relationship during the engagement, and that this affair continued after the two were married. The petitioner argued that had he known about the affair he would have never consented to the marriage and that this was grounds for annulment because consent requires a person to be "free and informed."

This petition for a decree of nullity was refused by the High Court. Mr. Justice O'Higgins held that while it had been accepted that the petitioner would not have entered into a marriage with the respondent had he been aware of her affair with another man, the evidence did not consent as to establishing whether his consent to the marriage was not full, free and informed.

The petitioner subsequently appealed to the Supreme Court.

== Holding of the Supreme Court ==
In dismissing this appeal and the cross-appeal the case of D.B v O'R [1991] 1 I.R 289, the Court ruled that these cases illustrate the use of the word "informed" as not being used in regard to consent, but instead refers to a situation where:

"The apparent decision to marry has been caused to such an extent by external pressure or influence, whether falsely or honestly applied, as to lose the character of a fully free act of that person's will".

Due to this context, the Court accepted that the use of "informed" in other judgements is used in a manner of being informed about the alternatives available to marriage. There was no suggestion that the petitioner should have been informed about either the conduct or character of the respondent prior to the marriage, and that if he was not so informed that the marriage was void.

In this case, the question was whether the husband's lack of knowledge of his partner's affair before and when married meant that his consent had been misinformed. McGuinness. J disagreed. McGuinness held that adultery was a ground for judicial separation but not a ground for annulment. The Court ruled that the definition of informed consent put forward by the petitioner was too broad. It could be used to request annulment in circumstances where any number of things were unknown to a party at the time of the marriage.

The court also ruled that there was a necessity for certainty in marriage, which is enshrined in the Constitution, and an introduction of a ground of nullity which would bring uncertainty to a wide variety of marriages was not only undesirable as a matter of public policy, it was contrary to the clear intention of the Constitution.

"This, it appears, would apply regardless of whether or not the information had been deliberately concealed by the respondent. The test is subjective.Presumably all that would be required would be for the Petitioner to give evidence that he or she would not have married the Respondent had this information been available before the marriage".

The Court dismissed the appeal.

== Subsequent developments ==
The more restrained test elaborated in this case is now the established limit.
