= Child and Family Agency v McG and JC =

Irish Supreme Court case

Child and Family Agency -v- McG and JC
- Coat of arms of Ireland
- Court: Supreme Court of Ireland
- Citations: [2017] IESC 9 [2017] IESC 1, [2017] IESC9

Case opinions
- Decision by: MacMenamin J

Child and Family Agency v McG and JC [2017] IESC 9, [2017] 1 IR 1 was a case in which the Irish supreme Court ruled that where a detention was lacking in due process of law due to breach of fundamental requirements of justice, it may be challenged through an application for release under the constitutional principle of habeas corpus even in the case of disputes as to the custody of children.

== Background ==
This case originally began in the District Court. An application for an intern care order for two children (aged 14 and 5) was made by the child and family agency. This order was made on the basis that both the mother (McG) and father (JC) were both drug addicts still battling with their addictions. The relationship the family had was quoted as being chaotic and violent at times. The mother and children had no settled home, but the children were in no immediate danger. Both the mother and father applied for free legal aid, while it was given to the mother the father was left waiting for legal advice. When the assigned solicitor met the mother for the first time it was only minutes away from the mother's court appearance and didn't have the required time to go through the social workers reports which the child and family agency were basing their case on. On this basis the solicitor assigned to the mother made an application for and adjournment for the time period of one week in order to prepare a proper defence for the mother and father. The judge in the trail had previously read the social worker reports from the Child and Family Agency and refused the application for an adjournment and ordered that the custody of the two children was to be turned over to the Child and Family Agency. In response to the judge's decision, McG brought a High Court habeas corpus application under article 40.4.2 of the Irish constitution seeking an order that her children were being held unlawfully.

== Holding of the High Court ==
In the High Court Baker J ordered the release of the children from the custody of the Child and Family Agency stating "I am satisfied that the order was not lawfully made and was made without affording an opportunity to the applicants to fully engage with the evidence". This was in view of how McG had tried to get legal advice but had met with a solicitor only moments before the District Court had retired to make a decision on the case. The child and family agency applied straight to the Supreme Court for a leapfrog appeal which let them go straight to the supreme court rather that going to the Court of Appeal before it goes to the Supreme Court. The court made the decision that the child and family agency had met the pre-existing constitutional threshold.

== Holding of the Supreme Court ==
When the case was forwarded onto the Supreme Court, MacMenamin J was given the responsibility to write the judgement for the 7 judges in attendance with the exception of only Charleton J, who dissented the view of the other judges but only in part. The child and family agency argued that habeas corpus proceedings were 'ill suited' to childcare issues and that such proceedings are limited to orders for detention issued without jurisdiction and that McG should instead have appealed the decision on merits. However, MacMenamin J dismissed such claims from the Child and Family Agency stating 3 reasons for his decision:

1. The Supreme Court's authority permits the use of the article 40 in childcare cases, for which a recent precedent is N v HSE (2006) IESC 60

2. The order which was given was comparable to a detention order as the children were in the sole care of the child and family agency and were not allowed to leave unless someone was with them,

3. It was deemed that there was a fundamental breach of fair procedure and therefore there was no jurisdiction.

In his conclusion, MacMenamin J held that "in the instant case, the practical vindication of the rights of parents warranted an appropriate, proper and effective level of legal representation in the district court proceedings permitting real engagement therein". He concluded, consequently, that an application for habeas corpus was "appropriate, in these exceptional circumstances, where there has been a denial of constitutional justice". But added that he would "entirely deprecate the usage of Article 40 proceedings in routine inter-parental care disputes".
