= The Health (Amendment) (No. 2) Bill 2004 =

Irish Supreme Court case

- Coat of arms of Ireland
- Court: Supreme Court of Ireland
- Full case name: In the matter of Article 26 of the Constitution and in the matter of the Health (Amendment) (No. 2) Bill 2004
- Decided: 16 February 2005
- Citation: [2005] 1 IR 105; [2005] 1 ILRM 401; [2005] IESC 7

Court membership
- Judges sitting: Murray C.J, Denham, McGuinness, Hardiman, Geoghegan, Fennelly and McCracken JJ

Case opinions
- To question the constitutionality of a bill
- Decision by: Murray C.J

Keywords
- Constitution of Ireland; Constitution; Access to services; Personal rights; Health; Right to recover property

The Health (Amendment) (No. 2) Bill 2004 [2005] IESC 7 was an Irish Supreme Court case where a bill containing amendments to the Health Act 1970 was brought before the supreme court after issues arose as to whether the provisions of the Bill were constitutional. The court found that the bill was repugnant to the constitution. The court ruled that patients were entitled to recover unlawful charges that they had paid because a person's rights to recover property are protected by the constitution.

== Background & Case Details ==
Article 26 of the Irish Constitution allows all bills to be sent to the supreme court by the president in order to ensure that they are not repugnant to the constitution. On 22 December 2004 the President referred the Health (Amendment) (No. 2) Bill 2004 to the Supreme Court for that purpose.

Section 51 of the Health Act 1970 defines "in-patient services" as institutional services provided to those maintained by the state either in hospitals, convalescent (nursery) homes or homes for the mentally disabled. The Act provides those in these institutions with maintenance, diagnosis, treatment, advice, medicines and special apparatus (if required). The act also distinguishes between those who can enjoy "full eligibility" and "limited eligibility" of such services. Section 45(1) of the Act describes Patients who are entitled to full eligibility as people who, without undue hardship, cannot arrange general practitioner medical and surgical services for themselves and their dependents.

Section 53(1) of the act states that charges cannot be levied on those with full eligibility, however, section 53(2) stated that those with limited eligibility may be charged for these services if the Minister for Health makes regulations to this effect. Charges were imposed and money was demanded unlawfully from those with full eligibility, contrary to the express provisions of the 1970 Act.

On 6 August 1976, the Department of Health reiterated to the health boards by way of a circular letter that all existing regulations made by the minister regarding in-patient services did not apply to those with full eligibility. However, in spite of this information, the health boards continued to charge those who were considered fully eligible. The pool of people considered fully eligible was also increased in 2001 as section 1 of The Health (Miscellaneous Provisions) Act 2001 extended the definition of those considered to be fully eligible to all persons who are normally resident in the state over the age of 70. Charges continued to be imposed on these people regardless.

The Health (Amendment) (No.2) Bill 2004 sought to amend section 53 of the 1970 Act by introducing new subsections (3)(4)(9)(10) and (11) regarding in-patient services. These provisions required the Minister for Health to regulate charges for some in-patient services; in addition the Minister was required to identify the "category" of people to which the charges applied, the circumstances for imposing them, and their maximum level. Furthermore the bill required that a chief executive officer of a health board to reduce or waive a fee arising from the regulations if there was an instance of individual hardship. In addition the Bill sought to introduce subsections (5)(6)(7) and (11) regarding relevant charges. These subsections would make the imposition of charges for in-patient services on persons with full eligibility lawful and would also consider them to have been always lawful. This would bar any patients bringing legal proceedings forward against the Minister for Health in order to recover their lost sums. In the past these charges had been imposed without any lawful authority and contradicted the express provision of Section 53(1) of the Act.

Counsel assigned by the court stated that the Oireachtas lacked the power to validate past acts that, at the time, were unlawful. While the Attorney General sought to justify the provisions by referencing the cost to the state of paying the claims of patients who had paid charges levied without authority.

== Ruling of the Supreme Court ==
In its ruling, the Supreme Court held:

1. The requirement for the Minister for Health to make regulations imposing charges for certain in-patient services while also setting out the category of persons on whom the charges should be charged was constitutional as well as the requirement that the minister set down the circumstances in which these charges may be imposed and the maximum level that the charges can be. Thus subsections (3)(4)(9)(10) and (11) regarding in patient services were all found to be constitutional.
2. The powers conferred on the Minister and Chief Executive Officers by ss 1(a) and (b) of the Bill were compatible with the Constitution.
3. Patients who had been unlawfully charged for these services had the right under articles 43 and 40.3.2 of the Constitution to sue in order to recover damages. The new provisions implemented by subsections (5)(6)(7) and (11) were therefore seen as an abolition of property rights and an unjust attack and therefore were found repugnant of the constitution.
