= Minister for Justice, Equality and Law Reform v Stafford =

Irish Supreme Court case

- Coat of Arms of Ireland
- Court: Supreme Court of Ireland
- Decided: 17 December 2009
- Citation: [2009] IESC 83
- Transcript: https://www.bailii.org/ie/cases/IESC/2009/S83.html

Case history
- Prior actions: Minister for Justice, Equality and Law Reform v Stafford [2006] IEHC 63
- Appealed from: High Court
- Appealed to: Supreme Court

Court membership
- Judges sitting: Denham J., Hardiman J., Finnegan J.

Case opinions
- There is sufficient detail described on the warrant to show the alleged participation, the alleged involvement, of the appellant in order to satisfy the requirements of the Act of 2003.
- Decision by: Denham J.

Keywords
- Constitution; Crime and Sentencing; EU Law

Minister for Justice, Equality and Law Reform v Stafford [2009] IESC 83 is an Irish Supreme Court case which considered the validity of a European Arrest Warrant. Pursuant to this warrant, the High Court directed the respondent, Mr Stafford, to surrender to authorities in the United Kingdom. Mr Stafford appealed this to the Supreme Court where he argued that the warrant was flawed and thus invalid. He also argued that there was not sufficient evidence to link him to the alleged offences.

The Court dismissed Mr Stafford's appeal, finding that the warrant did not contain a flaw which invalidated it. The Court also decided that a warrant which is based on circumstantial evidence can be enforced, according to the ruling of a court, even if the participation of the defendant is only suspected to have taken place in the crime.

== Background ==
Mr Martin Stafford was a resident of the United Kingdom. On April 12, 2005, he was taken before the Irish High Court following the issuance of a global arrest warrant for Mr Stafford by London's Bow Street Magistrates Court. Mr Stafford was charged with six offences, unlawful wounding, kidnapping, false imprisonment, rape, sexual touching, and murder.

The charges were for two different offences. The charge of unlawful wounding was about Mr Stafford's actions on July 25, 2004, when he talked to Mr David Lee Goodall. After threatening Mr Goodall, Mr Stafford was said to have injured him with a knife. The remaining charges centred on Ms. Michelle Gunshon's disappearance on December 4, 2004. In Ireland, Mr Stafford had previously been detained on suspicion of sexual assault and false imprisonment Before the High Court, he contested the arrest warrant.

Mr Stafford's lawyer, Michael O'Higgins SC, presented arguments to the court which contended that there was not sufficient evidence to implicate Mr Stafford to these crimes and therefore the warrant was defective. It was argued that the warrant did not contain adequate information regarding the crimes that have been committed and that the Court should issue judicial authority to provide additional documentation. Further, Mr Stafford should be required to prove the relevant similarities regarding the offenses appearing in the warrant; as Mr Stafford is currently charged with offenses in the Irish jurisdiction, his surrender would breach the Constitution and in particular Article 38.1 of Bunreacht na hÉireann which provides citizens the right to a fair trial.

All of these arguments were, however, rejected by the High Court, which also affirmed the warrant's legality. Mr Stafford appealed this decision to the Supreme Court.

== Holdings of the Supreme Court ==
Mr Stafford challenged the High Court's ruling on three different grounds. Initially, it was argued that a provision of the arrest warrant did not apply, rendering the warrant as a whole unlawful. Second, it was argued that there was insufficient proof of the violations in the warrant. Lastly, it was argued that there was no evidence connecting Mr Stafford to the crime.

Mr Stafford did not challenge the first charge on the warrant, which was unlawful wounding, but he did challenge charges two through six (kidnapping, false imprisonment, rape, sexual touching, and murder). Mr O'Higgins, Mr Stafford's lawyer, argued that the Judge erred in law in failing to interpret the statute in a way favourable to the Appellant. He said that Mr Stafford was not connected to the crimes and that the warrant was not valid. In court cases, evidence, especially direct evidence, is quite important. There is direct evidence that the facts of the case are true. Witnesses would be the prime examples.

These claims were denied by the Minister's lawyer. If the majority of the evidence in the warrant was circumstantial, that in and of itself is not a grounds to dismiss a request for surrender. Evidence that the court can infer conclusions from, such as fingerprints found at the scene of a crime, is known as circumstantial evidence. Furthermore, it was argued that Mr Stafford's detention was warranted in light of the mysterious circumstances surrounding Ms. Gunshon's disappearance. Mr Stafford was connected to these troubling events. It was further contended that while the EU rules mandated that an accurate description of the offences be included on a warrant, they omitted any information regarding the degree of the requisite evidence connection between the suspect and the offence.

The appeal was denied on the basis that there was sufficient proof connecting Mr Stafford to Ms. Gunshon's disappearance. Denham J. further determined that the warrant complied with the requirements of the 2003 European Arrest Warrant. Denham J. ultimately agreed with the defence lawyer's argument, declaring, that he was convinced that the facts on the warrant in this case are adequate to establish the conditions in which alleged offences were committed. The court dismissed Mr Stafford's appeal and maintained the High Court's ruling.

Martin Stafford was found guilty by the Birmingham Magistrates Court on July 31, 2012 for the abduction, rape, murder, and prevention of burial of Michelle Gunshon. The trial began on July 31, 2012. The judge ordered him to serve a total of thirty-three years in prison.
