= B.S. v. Director of Public Prosecutions =

Irish Supreme Court case

- Coat of arms of Ireland
- Court: Supreme Court of Ireland
- Decided: 6 December 2017
- Citation: [2017] IESCDET 134

Case history
- Appealed from: Court of Appeal
- Appealed to: Supreme Court

Court membership
- Judges sitting: Clarke C.J., O'Donnell J., McKechnie J., MacMenamin J., Dunne J., Charleton J., O'Malley J.

Case opinions
- very brief summary.

Keywords
- criminal offences, appealing cases, constitution, powers of the Supreme Court

B.S. v. Director of Public Prosecutions [2017] IESCDET 134; was an Irish Supreme Court case in which the Court ruled on the determination of article 34.5.3° of the Constitution when the Court can grant an allowance for an appeal from the Court of Appeal to the Supreme Court. The ruling declared that the Supreme Court "is no longer a Court for the correction of error but rather a Court which has the principal constitutional task of determining issues of general importance."

== Background ==
Mr S. was charged with the offence of rape alleged to have occurred between 1 January 1970 and 21 May 1970. Mr S. brought an application before the High Court seeking to prohibit his trial on the grounds of delay. The High Court where McDermott J resided heard and refused the application. Mr S. appealed to the Court of Appeal. Sheehan J. delivering the majority opinion in the Court of Appeal stated that Mr S had established sufficient prejudice so as to give rise to the risk of an unfair trail. Moreover, Sheehan J. concluded that the case before him met the test established in the case of H. v. Director of Public Prosecutions the "wholly exceptional circumstances category." For those reasons, the appeal was allowed and the trial was prohibited.

== Holding of the Supreme Court ==
The DPP sought leave to appeal the order of prohibition under Article 34 of the Constitution. The DPP claimed that the Court of Appeal had departed from the established jurisprudence on delay in the criminal context. In addition, the DPP argued that some of the grounds on which the Court of Appeal based their decision were erroneous. The court's decision offers clear guidance on when a prospective appeal has implications for established principles. In order for the Supreme Court to grant leave, it has to be established that it was either a matter of public importance or "that it is otherwise in the interest of justice necessary that there be an appeal to this Court".

The Supreme Court noted that since the enactment of the 33rd Amendment the function of the Supreme Court is no longer an appeal court to remedy errors made by the trial court. If the High Court has made an error within a case this Amendment now confers the power onto the Court of Appeal to remedy that error. The Supreme Court held it is clear from many decisions since the enactment of the 33rd Amendment to the Constitution and the terms of the Constitution, that in order for the Court to grant leave, the particular case involves a matter of general public importance or that it is otherwise in the interest of justice that it be appealed to the Court. Furthermore, the panel of judges in the Supreme Court agreed that "It will rarely be necessary in the interest of justice to permit an appeal to this court simply because it is said that the lower court was in error." The parties would have to appeal to the Court of Appeal. The Constitution will not allow parties to leapfrog from the High Court to the Supreme Court as the Supreme Court asserted that they will only hear appeals that are limited to issues that are important for the public or otherwise in the interest of justice to be heard by it. As the Supreme Court stated clearly that the overall approach to leave is clear:

“Unless it can be said that the case has the potential to influence true matters of principle rather than the application of those matters of principle to the specific facts of the case in question then the constitutional threshold will not be met”.

Therefore, the Supreme court is no longer a court for correction of error, but rather a court which has the constitutional task to determine issues of public importance. Therefore, the court decided that the case before them is not an appropriate case to grant leave to appeal.

== Subsequent developments ==
B.S. v. Director of Public Prosecutions along with the cases Price Waterhouse Coopers v. Quinn Insurance and Wansboro v. DPP set out when and how the Supreme Court will grant leave to appeal from the Court of Appeal or directly from the High Court. B.S. and Price Waterhouse Coopers established that the Supreme Court may grant leave to appeal where "a) that the decision involves a matter of general public importance; or (b) that in the interests of justice, it is necessary that there be a Supreme Court appeal." Wansboro decided when it may be necessary to leapfrog from the High Court to Supreme Court. The Supreme Court held factors which may be taken into consideration when deciding if this is necessary may be issues such as the cost of two appeals, matters of particular urgency, effect on other cases if they are awaiting the determination of this case and will the issues still be alive. All three decisions were unanimous by the Supreme Court.
