= Wansboro v DPP and anor =

Irish Supreme Court case

Wansboro v. DPP and anor
- Coat of arms of Ireland
- Court: Supreme Court of Ireland
- Full case name: Wansboro v. Director of Public Prosecutions and The Governor of MountJoy Prison
- Decided: 20 November 2017
- Citation: Wansboro v. DPP and anor [2017] IESCDET 115

Case history
- Appealed from: Judgment of Faherty J. (High Court) 16 June 2017
- Appealed to: Supreme Court

Court membership
- Judges sitting: O'Donnell J. McKechnie J. MacMenamin J. Dunne J. Charleton J. O'Malley J.

Case opinions
- Decision by: Clarke C.J

Keywords
- Practice and Procedure, Post Hearing, Appeal, Constitutional Law

Wansboro v DPP and anor, [2017] IESCDET 115 is an Irish Supreme Court case in which the Court ruled that granting 'leapfrog' leave to appeal directly to the Supreme Court from the High Court under Art. 34.5.4 of the Constitution of Ireland may be appropriate where the (intermediate) Court of Appeal has already clearly taken a view on the issues raised by the applicant.

== Background ==
=== Circuit Criminal Court ===
Mr. Wansboro, on 14 November 2013 appeared before the Dublin Circuit Criminal Court in respect of Bill No. 298/2012, where he was charged for an offence of unlawful taking of a vehicle, a drink driving offence and driving without a driver's license respectively. He received a three years and two six months concurrent sentences. These sentences were however suspended for a period of three years on conditions. On 22 April 2015 the applicant pleaded guilty to another offence of dangerous driving causing death and serious injury on Bill No. 99/2015. The said offence was committed on 24 May 2014, he was remanded in custody until 18 May 2015 for the purpose of a sentence hearing of the offence and possible activation of the suspended sentences for Bill No. 298/2012.

After hearing evidence and submission from both parties, the Court ordered the activation of the first suspended sentences and also imposed a sentence of five and half years imprisonment on Bill No. 99/2015 which would start immediately after expiration on first sentence.

=== High Court ===
Mr. Wansboro sought judicial review of an order of the Circuit Court on grounds of unconstitutionality. He contended that based on the decision of the High Court in Moore & Ors v. DPP the Circuit Court did not have Statutory power under s. 99(9) (10) of the Criminal Justice Act. 2016. The DPP on the other hand argued that the applicant failed to appeal his decision at the time the trial Court reactivated the suspension and further argued that he also did not challenge the constitutionality of s. 99(9) (10) at the time of his conviction for the triggering offence and did not evince an intention to appeal that sentence, thus he could not benefit from the decision of Moore & Ors v. DPP.

Justice Faherty denied relief sought by the applicant. The court held there was no denial of fundamental process or non observance of due process by the Circuit Court. The Court found that the applicant did not show any intention to appeal either the reactivation of the suspended sentence or the triggering offence at the relevant time, so therefore he could not invoke the unconstitutionality in the judgement in Moore.

== Holding of the Supreme Court ==
Mr. Wansboro sought to appeal directly to the Supreme Court. The Supreme Court granted leave to Mr Wansboro to appeal directly from the High Court. The Court relied on Article 34.5.4 of the Constitution of Ireland which gives it right for direct appeal from the High Court if satisfied that there are exceptional circumstances warranting direct appeal. The Court also considered the fact that there were two already decided cases by the Court of Appeal which follows the same reasoning as adopted by Faherty J (High Court Judge) so it is suggested that no useful purpose would be served to the applicant to first appeal to Court of Appeal.

First Issue raised by the Court was whether the general Constitutional threshold had been met?

Mr. Wansboro suggest the Constitutional threshold for leave to appeal has been met because it is an issue of the general public importance. While the DPP on the other hand argued that the decision in this case and that of the decided cases by the Court of Appeal are settled legal principles. It was established by the Supreme Court that the Constitutional threshold had been met.

The second Issue was whether it would be appropriate to grant leapfrog leave in the circumstances of this case?

In order for leapfrog leave to be granted, the general Constitution threshold of public importance or interest of justice must be met. Also for leapfrog leave to be granted, it be established that there are 'exceptional circumstances' which would justify direct appeal. The court identified some of these as; costs, speed, effect on the Cases, will the issue still be alive. In this case, leapfrog leave was granted in view, inter alia, of the importance of obtaining clarity on "the question of the effect of the decision in Moore on pre-existing orders made under the sections which were struck down in that case".

== Subsequent developments ==
The ruling in this case was used in a recent determination to grant leave to appeal in the case of Petecel v. Minister for Social Protection and leapfrog appeal in Data Protection Commissioner v. Facebook Ireland Ltd.
