= Director of Corporate Enforcement v Barry Seymour =

Irish Supreme Court case

Director of Corporate Enforcement v. Barry Seymour, [2011] IESC 45; [2013] 1 IR 82.
- Coat of arms of Ireland
- Court: Supreme Court of Ireland
- Citation: [2011] IESC 45; [2013] 1 IR 82.

Case history
- Appealed from: High Court
- Appealed to: Supreme Court

Court membership
- Judges sitting: Macken J, Denham CJ, Finnegan J

Case opinions
- Decision by: Macken J.
- Concurrence: Denham C.J., Finnegan J.

Keywords
- Finance, Tax evasion, Director, National Irish Bank.

Director of Corporate Enforcement v Barry Seymour [2011] IESC 45; [2013] 1 IR 82, was an Irish Supreme Court case in which the Court ruled that commercial misjudgement was not in itself sufficient to justify disqualification as a company director under the Companies Act 1990.

== Background ==
Mr Justice Rodrick Murphy (Murphy J) presided over the High Court hearing preceding this case. In coming to his concluding judgment, Murphy J considered the actions of Mr Seymour as an experienced individual in the Irish banking sector. Prior to assessing Mr Seymour's culpability however, the court first considered the application of an inspection report made by the Minister for Enterprise, Trade and Employment in 1998 concerning the financial affairs of NIB and National Irish Bank Financial Services Ltd. (NIBFS). Following the conclusion of the inspection report, it was established that both bodies were involved in inappropriate practices. Though the inspection lasted for a duration of 10 years, the High Court noted how Mr Seymour was only employed in the bank between 1994 and 1996.

The Report stated the Inspectors' conclusion that responsibility for six improper practices rested with the senior management of NIB. The High Court assessed the actions of Mr Seymour and held that liability was present. Most particularly, liability was attached to senior management within the bank. Pursuant to the judgment, Macken J, writing for the Supreme Court, listed the following six key causes for concern with respect to the inspector's report:

1) Funds were found to being concealed for the purposes of tax evasion.

2) Tax was reduced at a lower rate on special savings accounts.

3) There was increased ambiguity pertaining to the names of account holders. This flagged a suspicion among those conducting the inspection report and considered the likelihood of false accounts being used.

4) Other means of investments were used. An example being the over reliance on clerical medical insurance.

5) Fees were being charged at different rates for customers.

6) Interest was being charged to customers at different rates.

Based upon the above points, deception appears to be a common factor. It is due to this that Mr Seymour, in his position in the bank, was held liable in the High Court and disqualified from the management of any company for nine years. Based upon the judgment of Macken J of the Supreme Court, however, "the appellant was the wrong man in the wrong place at the wrong time for the position he was taking over". This statement of the judge is further reinforced by the point made in relevant commentary of the Supreme Court decision; Mr Seymour had worked in the industry for 42 years and has never before had a complaint filed against him.

== Holding of the Supreme Court ==
The case proves significant for both directors and companies in Ireland.

Macken J of the Supreme Court held that the 'ultimate responsibility' test was not satisfied by the Director of Corporate Enforcement. In her judgment, Macken J stated how there was limited literature examining 'ultimate responsibility'. Additionally, the learned judge denotes the limited applicability of the test in the Irish jurisdiction. Based upon both these findings, to find Mr Seymour guilty of the alleged offences, would appear to be increasingly difficult.

Macken J highlights a "grave failure" in respect of Mr Seymour and the board's approach to their tax affairs. In acknowledging the actions of Mr Seymour and senior management, the learned judge also draws upon the fact that Mr Seymour had minimal experience in his role as director. Indeed, he did hold a significant amount of experience in the banking sector. In addition, he had been trusted by colleagues to fill the role as director within the bank.

One overriding aspect of Macken's J decision however is the bank's ability of addressing the major problem pertaining to DIRT (Deposit Interest Retention Tax). DIRT is a tax paid on savings. While there were evident miscalculations and ambiguity surrounding false accounts, there was an obvious need for reform within the bank's structure and employment.

Macken J acknowledged the steps the bank has taken since the findings of the inspection were made available.

The Supreme Court held Mr Barry Seymour's actions in National Irish Bank Ltd. (NIB) were not sufficient to warrant disqualification under section of 160 of the Act and overturned the High Court decision. However, given the breaches of tax law and indeed the responsibilities expected of a director of a financial institution such as NIB, the Supreme Court concluded that Mr Seymour ought nevertheless to be subject to a restriction order for five years under section 150.
