= McGowan v Labour Court =

Irish Supreme Court case

Benedict McGowan and Others v Labour Court and Others 2013
- Coat of arms of Ireland
- Court: Supreme Court of Ireland
- Citation: [2013] 2 ILRM 276

Case history
- Appealed from: High Court
- Appealed to: Supreme Court

Court membership
- Judges sitting: Denham CJ, Murray J, Fennelly J, Clarke J., O'Donnell J

Keywords
- Administrative Law, Constitutional Law, Industrial Relations Law

Benedict McGowan and Others v Labour Court and Others [2013] 2 ILRM 276; [2013] IESC 21; [2013] 3 IR 718 is an Irish Supreme Court case, where an appeal was granted and the court made a declaration that the provisions of Part III of the Industrial Relations Act are invalid considering the provisions of Article 15.2.1 of the Constitution of Ireland. This court questioned the method by which wages and other benefits (including pensions) were set on a collective basis across numerous sectors.

== Background ==
The appellants were electrical contractors who were affected by an Employment Agreement registered by the Labour Court on the 24th of September 1990 in accordance with the provisions of Part III of the Industrial Relations Act 1946.

The employment agreement- the Industrial Relations Act 1946 contained provisions which did set out specific terms and conditions of employment of electricians within the construction sector which the Court had to also carefully consider including the Registered Employment Agreements.

The agreement in question had been the subject of constant disputes particularly complaints involving group of employers organised in the National Electrical Contractors Association. Some of the complaint involved the fact that they have been bound by an agreement to which they were not a party, and in which the employers’ interests were represented by parties which they do not consider represented their interests.

== Holding of the High Court ==
The applicants sought to challenge the REA (Registered Employment Agreement) on the ground of unconstitutionality and they also challenged the decision of the Labour Court in refusing to cancel the REA. Aside that fact many other issues arose in the High Court, such as alleged errors of law, objective bias and the question of reasonableness in relation to the Labour Court’s decision. However, Hedigan J dismissed the applicants different claims and on the question of the constitutionality of the REA, the learned Judge dismissed it due to the excessive delay.

== Holding of the Supreme Court ==
The Supreme Court had no doubt that it can hear and determine an appeal on an issue which the High Court has heard but not determined.

However, before reaching its decision, the Court considered whether the appellants had the right to raise the constitutionality of Part III of the Act of 1946 in respect of Article 15.2.1 of the Constitution, whether Part III of the Industrial Relations Act of 1946 or any section thereof infringed Article 15.2.1 of the Constitution by allocating the making, variation and cancellation of registered employment agreements to the Labour Court and the parties to such agreements.

Under the Industrial Relations Act 1946 there were two methods including a general sectoral agreement. This created terms and conditions of employment in a specified industry or sector of an industry that was legally enforceable both in civil and criminal law. Although the case was related to Pat III of the provisions, the court considered the provisions of Part IV of 1946 Act which was the subject of the case law on which the court relied on.

Under Part IV of the Industrial Relations Act particularly sections 34-58 the Labour Court had the power to create Joint Labour Committees (JLCs) either where there was substantial agreement among groups on behalf of employers and employees, or where it was considered that the existing system for the regulation of remuneration and other conditions made it convenient to establish such a body. A JLC, had the power to make a submission to the Labour Court where accepted by the Labour Court, which resulted in the making of an Employment Regulation Order (ERO) and gave effect to the proposals of the JLC. The substantial effect of the ERO was to make provisions concerning remuneration and conditions of employment part of the contract of employment between an employer and an employee within the sector (whether represented in the JLC or not). Where one failed to comply with such terms it was enforceable in civil law, resulting in a criminal offense punishable by a fine and there was an inspection body put in place to assist in the enforcement of the provision.

The Court also looked at the definition of an employment agreement under Part III of the Industrial Relations Act 1946, as an agreement that regulates remuneration and conditions of employment of work, made between trade unions and an employer or a group of employers or at a meeting of the registered Joint Industrial Council. Part III of the Act allows employment agreements to be registered with the Labour Court where the agreement satisfied and complied with the conditions of six sub-paragraphs of s.27 of the Act. Once registered, the agreement is legally binding, not only on the parties to the agreement but on every worker and employer in that sector therefore, enforceable by criminal prosecution. These agreements are normally negotiated between trade unions and employers, who are supposed to be substantially representative of their particular industry.

The Court looked further into section 30(1) of the Act which provides that:

"A registered employment agreement shall, so long as it continues to be registered, apply, for the purposes of this section, to every worker of the class, type or group to which it is expressed to apply, and his employer, notwithstanding that such worker or employer is not a party to the agreement or would not, apart from this subsection, be bound thereby."

The Court noted that the most remarkable feature of Parts III and IV of the 1946 Act to modern eyes was that both EROs and REAs were made part of the criminal law and everyone who took part in the relevant sector was bonded. This scheme perhaps inevitably would come under increasing scrutiny. In its Judgment, the Court considered, the decision of Burke v. The Labour Court [1979] I.R. 354 where the first challenged aroused. In that case, the ERO was challenged on the ground of non-constitutionality by representatives of the employers and Supreme Court held that the relevant JLC had failed to comply with fair procedures. The court considered it essential to address the central issue raised in this appeal which was Article 15.2.1 of the Irish Constitution which states in a very clear terms that:

"The sole and exclusive power of making laws for the State is hereby vested in the Oireachtas: no other legislative authority has power to make laws for the State." The Court found Article 15.2.1 of the Irish Constitution while striking and emphatic, however it appears to be tautologous because, if the "sole and exclusive power" for making laws is conferred in the Oireachtas, this means that no other body has power to make laws for the State. The Court looked at the judgment of Hanna J. in Pigs Marketing Board v. Donnelly (Dublin) Ltd. [1939] I.R.413 where it was stated that, "It is self-evident that powers conferred upon the Legislature to make laws cannot be delegated to any other body or authority. The Oireachtas is the only constitutional agency by which laws can be made".

The Court considered the judgment of Feeney J in John Grace Fried Chicken Ltd and Others v Catering Joint Labour Committee and Others [2011] IEHC 277, [2011] 3 IR 211 where it was held that, the provisions of part IV were in breach of the Constitution.

In this case, O'Donnell J. in its judgment found that Part III of the Industrial Relations Act, conferred on parties to the Employment Agreement the right to make any law they wished in relation to employment so long as the Labour Court considered them substantially as the representative of workers and employees in the sector. This relevant provision of the criminal law was not however made by the Oireachtas, but rather by private individuals, themselves participants in the industry being regulated. Consequently, in the Court's findings, the scheme of the 1946 Act conferred a high degree of sovereignty on participants to an ERO or an REA. This was done so in the sense that they had the power to make law for themselves and they were also empowered to make law for others which gave rise to the burdensome restraints on competition for potential employers and invasive control over potential employees. Therefore, a declaration of invalidity was granted.

== Subsequent developments ==
Benedict McGowan and Others v Labour Court and Others [2013] IESC 21, [2013] 3 IR 718 has been referred to in:

- Collins v Minister for Finance [2016] IESC 73, [2017] 3 IR 99
- Da Silva, Miranda and Da Silva v Rosas Construtores S.A. [2017] IECA 252

The Minister for Jobs, Enterprise and Innovation, Richard Bruton issued a statement after the Supreme Court Judgment stating that, the Government had received the judgment and planned to study it and take legal advice before making any detailed comment. However, the statement also explained that existing contractual rights of workers in sectors covered by REA are not affected by the ruling. While the Technical, Electrical and Engineering Union also commented that the ruling removes the existing protection for workers, the NECI (National Electrical Contractors Ireland) has welcomed the decision, stating that an expectation that many jobs will now be secured because long term, viable pay and conditions can now be agreed.
