= Damache v Minister for Justice =

2021 Supreme Court of Ireland case

- Court: Supreme Court of Ireland
- Decided: 10 February 2021
- Citation: [2021] IESC 6

Damache v Minister for Justice was a case at the Supreme Court of Ireland involving a constitutional challenge to section 19 of the Irish Nationality and Citizenship Act 1956, concerning deprivation of citizenship. It had two grounds, one of which was rejected, and one accepted.

== Case and judgment ==
The case concerned the deprivation of a naturalised citizen of their Irish citizenship, and raised two grounds of appeal. On that concerning the basis of the power to remove Irish citizenship from a naturalised citizen, the Supreme Court held that the revocation of citizenship was not an aspect of the judicial power, and so constitutionally reserved to the judicial branch, but rather an executive power, correctly exercised by a member of the government, but subject to judicial review. On the second ground, the court found that the extant process breached fair procedures, as the minister oversaw all of the raising of a bid to revoke citizenship, any challenges to this, and the final decision on the matter. The appellant therefore succeeded in his case.
