= DC v Director of Public Prosecutions =

Irish Supreme Court case

D.C. v Director of Public Prosecutions
- Coat of arms of Ireland
- Court: Supreme Court of Ireland
- Decided: 21 November 2005
- Citation: D.C. v Director of Public Prosecutions [2005] 4 IR 281, [2006] ILRM 348; [2005] IESC 77

Case history
- Appealed from: High Court
- Appealed to: Supreme Court

Court membership
- Judges sitting: Denham J., Mc Guinness J., McMenamin J.

Case opinions
- The Supreme Court confirmed that the standard to be met for prohibiting a trial is "where there is a real or serious risk of an unfair trial".
- Decision by: Denham J

D.C. v DPP [2005] 4 IR 281, [2006] ILRM 348; [2005] IESC 77 was an Irish Supreme Court case in which the Court confirmed that the standard to be met for prohibiting a trial is "where there is a real or serious risk of an unfair trial".

== Background ==
The appellant was being charged with rape. He sought leave for judicial review based on an alleged failure by the Gardaí (police) to seek out and make available witness statements concerning the previous sexual history of the complainant on the basis of statements made by witnesses for the prosecution. The High Court refused to grant leave for judicial review. The appellant then sought leave to have a trial in which he was the defendant prohibited (prevented from proceeding).

This type of application will only succeed in certain exceptional circumstances. The High Court refused to grant the appellant leave on the basis that he had not satisfied the threshold set out in G. v. Director of Public Prosecutions [1994] which is that:

"the onus of proof which is on an accused person who seeks an order prohibiting his trial on the ground that circumstances have occurred which would render it unfair is that he should establish that there is a real risk that by reason of those circumstances (which in that case also was pre-trial publicity) he could not obtain a fair trial."

Nor had he satisfied any higher threshold which might be required of the appellant.

== Holding of the Supreme Court ==
The appellant appealed to Supreme Court on the grounds that the trial judge erred in law in failing (among other things) to grant leave to apply for judicial review.

Denham J delivered the only written judgment, with which the other judges concurred.

The Court upheld the High Court's decision and dismissed the appeal. The Court noted that "[i]n considering an application for prohibition a review court should not merely pick out an element and conclude that arising from it there is a possibility of an unfair trial." Rather, the test is that "of a serious risk of an unfair trial." With that test in mind, the appellant had not established an arguable case that there was such a serious risk of an unfair trial.

The Court also noted that the Court should be slow to interfere with a decision of the Director of Public Prosecutions that a prosecution should be brought.
