= Z. v Minister for Justice, Equality and Law Reform =

Irish Supreme Court case

Z. v Minister for Justice 2002
- Court: Supreme Court of Ireland
- Full case name: Z. v Minister for Justice, Equality and Law Reform, James Nicholson sitting as the Appeals Authority, Ireland and Attorney General
- Decided: 2002
- Citation: [2002] IESC 14; [2002] 2 ILRM 215

Case history
- Appealed from: High Court
- Appealed to: Supreme Court

Court membership
- Judges sitting: Keane, C.J. Denham, J. Murphy, J. Murray, J. McGuinness J.

Keywords
- Asylum Immigration and Nationality Asylum Refugee Status

Z. v Minister for Justice, Equality and Law Reform [2002] IESC 14, [2002]; 2 ILRM 215 is an Irish Supreme Court case where the Court ruled that the absence of an oral hearing need not infringe the right of an applicant for refugee status to natural and constitutional justice.

== Background ==
The Appellant, a 53 years of age, of Russian nationality, arrived in Ireland on the 18th of October 1999 and applied for refugee status with the first named respondent.

In his submission the Appellant stated that, he has "no religion" but ethnically he is considered Jewish because his mother is Jewish. He was attacked by the Chechen paramilitaries. Afterwards he was kidnapped by the Chechen and held captive for a year. He stated that he had not received any assistance from the Russian authorities during that time. Rather the Russian authorities brought criminal allegations against him for surrendering his weapons to the paramilitaries and for disobeying superior orders.

The Appellants after being interviewed by the state, his case was found to be "manifestly unfounded" on the grounds of paragraphs 14(a), 14(b) and 14(c) of the Hope Hanlan Procedures.

The applicant therefore sought different relief based on different grounds including,

1. The first respondent when considering the Appellant's application to be "manifestly unfounded", failed to do it in accordance with the guidelines and/or directions of the UNHCR in respect with this type of case.
2. Secondly, the first named respondent also failed to comply with his own guidelines which were laid down for the use and purpose of whether applications were manifestly unfounded within the meaning of the Hope Hanlon Procedures.

=== Holding of the High Court ===
Finnegan J. in the High Court, considered all the grounds put forth by the Appellant. However, he was not satisfied with all the grounds brought forth by the Appellant aside, (set sub-paragraph(j)). With regards to sub-paragraph (j), Finnegan J. judged that, there was "no universal requirement or general entitlement to an oral hearing of an appeal". Although there is little to suggest that the dictum of Brennan J. had any lasting impact on the High Court, However, influenced by the findings of the US Supreme Court in Golberg v. Kelly 397 U.S. 254 Finnegan J. granted the Appellant leave to bring judicial review proceedings on one ground which was failure to provide an oral hearing at the appeal stage.
Finnegan J. also considered the meaning of the phrase "substantial ground"in section 5 of the Act of 2000 and also referred to the Illegal Immigrants (Trafficking) Bill 1999 and stated that:

"Whether, on an application, for leave to apply for judicial review in accordance to section 5 of the Illegal Immigrants (Trafficking) Act 2000 brought in relation to a decision to refuse an application for refugee status on the grounds that the application is manifestly unfounded,

1. (i) It is therefore appropriate to apply the principles set out in O’Keeffe v An Bord Pleanála [1993] IR 39, in particular having regard to the approach of the UNHCR to manifestly unfounded applications for refugee status: and
2. (ii) The methods or manner used was manifestly unfounded; procedures were and/or were operated by the Respondents, or any of them, and/or as applied to the Applicant’s application were in breach of the Applicant’s constitutional rights and the requirements of natural and constitutional justice.”

== Holding of the Supreme Court ==
The Court in its judgment, discussed the characteristics of judicial review while making reference to the statement of Finlay C.J. in Keeffe v An Bord Pleanála [1993] IR 39 that,

"The Court cannot interfere with the decision of an administrative decision-making authority merely on the grounds that,

1. It is satisfied that based on the facts as found it would have raised different interference and conclusions or
2. Where the court is satisfied that case against the decision made by the authority was much stronger than the case of it."

According to the Appellant, the decisions and recommendations on his refugee status claim were unreasonable and irrational therefore ultra vires. In relation to this submission, the Court referred to the test of unreasonableness set out in the judgment of Henchy. J in the State(Keegan) v The Stardust Victims Compensation Tribunal [1986] IR 642 which stated that,

" ...in most cases, a decision is quashed for unreasonableness, not because of the extent to which it has departed from accepted moral standards but because it is indefensible for being in the teeth of plain reason and common sense. The test of unreasonableness or irrationality in a judicial review is to consider whether the impugned decision plainly and unambiguously flies in the face of fundamental reason and common sense. Where it does, then the decision-maker should be held to have acted ultra vires."

This general approach to judicial review was also applied in the judgment of Kelly J. in the High Court in Flood v Garda Compensation Complaints Board [1997] 2 IR 321. The Court concluded that the applicant's appeal against the Minister's rejection of his application for refugee status must be dismissed.

== Subsequent developments ==
Z. v Minister for Justice, Equality and Law Reform, James Nicholson sitting as the Appeals Authority, Ireland and Attorney General [2002] IESC 14, [2002] 2 ILRM 215 was later applied in Olawale v Refugee Applications Commissioner & Minister for Justice [2002] IEHC 152
