= Transgender history in Ireland =

This article covers the history of transgender people on the island of Ireland, encompassing both the Republic of Ireland and Northern Ireland.

Transgender is a broad contemporary umbrella term that did not exist in its current form until the mid-twentieth century. Its application to historical figures requires care, as scholars have noted that individuals who might today be understood as transgender have frequently been recorded through the lens of women's history, lesbian and gay history, or dismissed as "passing women," in ways that obscure rather than illuminate their lives. During the early medieval period, the term hermaphrodite - or less frequently androgyny - was used to refer to transgender, non-binary and queer peoples.

== Historiography ==
The study of transgender history in Ireland faces particular challenges.

The loss of the Public Record Office of Ireland in 1922 destroyed large quantities of ecclesiastical and civil records. Records that survive tend to make gender-variant people visible only at moments of crisis, scandal, or death, filtered through the assumptions and language of those who recorded them. Irish queer and trans histories have, until recently, focused more on political movements than on individual lived experiences. Scholarship specifically addressing trans history in Ireland is growing, with researchers including Leanne Calvert, Mary McAuliffe, and Sara Phillips situating Irish historical figures within a trans historical framework rather than subsuming them into women's or lesbian and gay history.

The application of modern terminology to historical figures is itself contested; there is ongoing scholarly debate about whether individuals who lived centuries ago would have understood themselves in contemporary trans terms, and whether such understanding is recoverable from surviving records.

=== Medieval records ===
Gerald of Wales recorded two accounts of gender-variant individuals in Ireland in his Topographia Hibernica (c. 1188), written following his visits to Ireland in the 1180s. Gerald's text was written to justify the Anglo-Norman invasion of Ireland and its section on marvels and prodigies served a rhetorical purpose: recording bodies that departed from binary norms as 'wondrous' or 'monstrous' constructed Ireland as exotic and outside civilised European norms, and these accounts tell us as much about Norman colonial ideology as about the individuals described.

In Chapter XX, Gerald describes a woman at the court of Duvenald (Donnchad), King of Limerick, who had a beard reaching to her navel and a hairy crest running from the top of her neck to her backbone. Gerald explicitly and emphatically states she was "not an hermaphrodite, but in other respects had the parts of a woman" and that she "constantly attended the court". Gerald's deliberate distinction from "hermaphrodite" is itself a notable textual choice, signalling awareness of a category of bodily variance that exceeded his available terminology. In a later revised version of the text, Gerald added a second account of a person described as a "hermaphrodite" seen recently at the court of Connacht; scholars have established that this addition was made specifically to corroborate the earlier Limerick account after critics questioned its credibility, suggesting the original account was being challenged even within Gerald's own lifetime.

Applying modern trans or intersex frameworks to these accounts requires caution, though they are among the earliest written records of gender-variant people at Irish royal courts. Early Irish literary and hagiographical texts also contain accounts of sex and gender that do not map onto a fixed binary. Early Irish narratives did not operate with the same fixed distinction between sex and gender that modern readers assume; texts including "The Story of the Abbot of Drimnagh," in which a person undergoes a transformation between sexes, and the Irish Life of St Abbán reveal a conception of sex characteristics as mutable rather than immutable. Early Irish saints' lives similarly contain gender-bending motifs, with Irish Christians developing native legal concepts to describe exceptional gender status that drew on Brehon law categories which did not straightforwardly map onto the male/female binary. The application of trans and queer theoretical frameworks to early Irish mythology and literature (including readings of figures such as Cú Chulainn) remains a debated and emerging area of scholarship.

== Early modern period ==
=== Eighteenth century ===
One of the earliest cases in Ireland analysed within a trans historical framework comes from the records of the Presbyterian Kirk Session of Templepatrick, County Antrim. In March 1706, a woman named Margaret McCal appeared before the session and complained that a fellow church member, known to her as Elizabeth McIlroy, had "came to her Dressed in mans cloaths and called her self David Campbell pretending courtship to her." The session found "nothing worth time to debate upon" and directed the parties to reconcile.

Historian Leanne Calvert argues that David Campbell should not be read simply as a woman who crossdressed on a single occasion, but as an individual who "moved through the world at particular points in time as a man," noting that David never denied wearing men's clothes when challenged before the session, and that their maleness appears to have been recognised within the community through participation in male social rituals. Calvert uses they/them pronouns for David, following Kit Heyam's approach for individuals who "embodied multiple gendered possibilities at once."

== Nineteenth century ==
=== James Barry ===
James Barry (born Margaret Anne Bulkley; c. 1789 – 25 July 1865) was a military surgeon in the British Army, born in Cork, Ireland. He obtained a medical degree from the University of Edinburgh Medical School, rose to the rank of Inspector General of Hospitals, and served across the British Empire, improving conditions for soldiers and civilian populations. He performed one of the first recorded caesarean sections by a European in Africa in which both mother and child survived, and disputed Florence Nightingale over hygiene standards at Scutari during the Crimean War.

Barry lived his entire adult life as a man, referring to himself with male pronouns, signing letters as "Dr Barry," and leaving standing instructions that "strict precautions should be adopted to prevent any examination of his person" after death. After his death from dysentery on 25 July 1865, a charwoman informed his physician that Barry had been assigned female at birth; his physician Major McKinnon stated in correspondence that he did not know whether Barry was "male, female, or hermaphrodite." Scholars have debated his gender identity: Jeremy Dronfield has argued that Barry assumed a male identity primarily to pursue a medical career; Rachel Holmes has raised the possibility that Barry may have been intersex; and Ann Heilmann has argued that Barry can be "convincingly placed in a transgender context" as someone who became male not only in outward but in inner identity. In 2020, RTÉ was criticised for misgendering and deadnaming Barry in the documentary series Herstory: Ireland's Epic Women, which described him as "a young girl from Cork" who "dressed and lived as a man."

=== Patrick McCormack ===
In 2018, the Irish historian and podcaster, Fin Dwyer, identified a death record in the files of the North Dublin Workhouse hospital. Recording the death of Patrick McCormack (c. 1821–1871), the document noted McCormack's gender as male, while a write-in note indicated the they had been born as "a female". Dwyer described McCormack as "the first transperson I have ever come across in records", and a number of sources suggested that they could be the "first transgender person recorded in Dublin". Dwyer's research suggested that McCormack lived in Castleknock, Dublin for at least 30 years, and worked as a day labourer. McCormack, who fell ill around the age of 50, was admitted to the workhouse hospital and, having survived for a few months at the hospital, died there in April 1871. Little else has been discovered as McCormack's birth name and place of birth are not known.

=== John Bradley ===
In March 1889, the Kildare Observer published an article describing the arrest of John Bradley and his transfer to Grangegorman prison after disclosing to warders that he had been assigned female at birth. The newspaper noted that Bradley had been known in his community as a boy from a young age and had attended the Christian Brothers school on Francis Street, Naas.

=== Edward de Lacy Evans ===
Edward De Lacy Evans (c. 1830 – 25 August 1901) was born in County Kilkenny, Ireland, and emigrated to Victoria, Australia, in 1856. He worked as a miner and blacksmith and married three times; he is registered as the father of his daughter on her birth certificate. In July 1879, following a personal crisis, he was admitted to Bendigo Hospital and subsequently transferred to Kew Asylum, where his assigned gender at birth was discovered when staff attempted to bathe him; he had refused to bathe for six weeks to preserve his identity. He was released on the condition that he wear women's clothing and use his birth name, and around 1880 performed at the Melbourne Waxworks as "The Wonderful Male Impersonator."

=== Other recorded individuals ===
Sara Phillips identifies several further trans figures recorded in Ireland in the nineteenth century, including John Murphy (c. 1800–30) and Mariann Weldon (c. 1863), though little biographical information about them has been recovered.

== Twentieth century ==
=== Eva Gore-Booth and Urania ===
Eva Gore-Booth (1870–1926) was an Irish poet, suffragist and labour activist born at Lissadell House, County Sligo, and the younger sister of Constance Markievicz. While Gore-Booth made no explicit public statement about their own gender identity, they co-founded a publication that declared "There are no 'men' or 'women' in Urania" and that "sex is an accident."

In 1916, Gore-Booth co-founded Urania, a privately circulated feminist journal published until 1940, alongside their lifelong partner Esther Roper and co-editors Irene Clyde (also known as Thomas Baty), Dorothy Cornish and Jessey Wade. Urania argued against gender binaries and collected and reprinted material on feminist movements, same-sex relationships, gender-affirming surgeries, and gender variance from around the world. It was distributed without charge to a network of supporters with a reported circulation of around 250 and was not available to the public. Gore-Booth died in June 1926; Urania continued under the remaining editors until 1940. Issues from 1919 to 1940 were digitised by The Women's Library at the London School of Economics and made available through the LSE Digital Library in 2023.

=== Michael Dillon ===
Michael Dillon (1 May 1915 – 15 May 1962) was born Laurence Michael Dillon in Kensington, London, the son of Robert Arthur Dillon, heir to the baronetcy of Lismullen in County Meath, Ireland. He studied at St Anne's College, Oxford and enrolled at the Trinity College Dublin Medical School in 1945.

Dillon became the first documented trans man to undergo phalloplasty, receiving a series of surgeries at Rooksdown House, Basingstoke, performed by surgeon Harold Gillies from 1946 onwards during holidays from medical school, under a falsified diagnosis of hypospadias. In 1946, he published Self: A Study in Ethics and Endocrinology, one of the earliest published arguments for patient-centred gender-affirming medical treatment. In 1950, while still a student at Trinity, Dillon performed an orchiectomy on Roberta Cowell, enabling her to receive further gender-affirming surgery and become the first known British trans woman to undergo male-to-female sex reassignment surgery. In 1958, after the press reported on his transition without his consent, Dillon resigned from the Merchant Navy and moved to India, where he pursued Buddhism under the name Lobzang Jivaka, dying in Dalhousie on 15 May 1962.

=== Early community organisation ===
The Transgender Equality Network of Ireland (TENI) was established in 2006 as the primary national advocacy organisation for trans people in the Republic of Ireland. Claire Farrell co-founded Friends of Eon, described as Ireland's first official trans support group, and was active as a trans rights advocate for over four decades, serving as an elected director of TENI until 2018.

=== Lydia Foy and the campaign for legal gender recognition ===
Lydia Foy (born 23 June 1947) is a retired dentist from Athy, County Kildare, who led the legal campaign for gender recognition in Ireland. Foy had gender affirming surgery in 1992 and in 1993 applied to the Registrar-General to have her birth certificate amended to reflect her gender identity; the application was refused. In 1997, represented by Free Legal Advice Centres (FLAC), she began legal proceedings against the Registrar-General.

The High Court rejected her first challenge in July 2002, though Mr Justice Liam McKechnie called on the government to address the position of trans people in Irish law. Following the European Court of Human Rights' ruling in Goodwin and I v United Kingdom (2002), Foy brought a second challenge. In October 2007, the High Court issued the first Irish declaration of incompatibility between domestic law and the European Convention on Human Rights, finding that Ireland had violated Foy's right to respect for private life under Article 8. The Irish government withdrew its appeal in June 2010 and established an interdepartmental committee on the legal recognition of trans people. No legislation was introduced by February 2013, when Foy initiated a third set of proceedings. In 2025, Foy was awarded the Jim Larkin Thirst for Justice Award by the Labour Party.

== Twenty-first century ==
=== Gender Recognition Act 2015 ===
The Gender Recognition Act 2015 was enacted on 15 July 2015, making Ireland the fourth country globally to introduce gender recognition legislation based on self-identification, with no requirement for medical diagnosis or judicial authorisation. The Act allows any person aged eighteen or over to apply for a Gender Recognition Certificate by statutory self-declaration, enabling them to obtain a new birth certificate reflecting their gender identity. Ireland joined Argentina, Denmark, Malta and Colombia in adopting self-declaration as the basis for legal gender recognition. The Act does not provide recognition for non-binary people and includes only a restrictive process for those aged 16–17, requiring parental consent and medical documentation. Between its enactment and the end of 2024, a total of 1,881 Gender Recognition Certificates had been granted, with annual applications levelling out in the low 300s. A mandatory three-year review carried out in 2018 recommended extending recognition to those under 18 with parental consent and to non-binary people; as of 2025 the Irish government had not acted on these recommendations.

=== Barbie Kardashian ===
Barbie Kardashian is a transgender woman who held a Gender Recognition Certificate and a certificate from the Department of Social Protection recognising her as female. In May 2022, she was found guilty at Limerick Circuit Court of seven counts of threatening to kill or cause serious harm to her mother; she had been in State care since the age of ten. In October 2024, she was found not guilty on all charges at Limerick Circuit Court relating to separate alleged threats to a fellow prisoner and a prison officer at Limerick Prison. Her case has been cited in debates around the Gender Recognition Act 2015; a proposed amendment that would limit the effect of a Gender Recognition Certificate for the purposes of imprisonment had passed its first legislative stage as of late 2025.

=== Arts and media ===
In September 2017, actor Jack Murphy became the first trans character to appear in an Irish soap opera when he joined the cast of Fair City as Ryan. In 2018, Murphy publicly discussed his experience on waiting lists for gender-affirming healthcare, drawing attention to barriers facing trans people in Ireland. Lydia Foy was the subject of the RTÉ Radio 1 documentary My name is Lydia Foy in 2011.

=== Politics ===
In December 2023, Saoirse Mackin was nominated by the Social Democrats to contest Cork City North West in the 2024 local elections, becoming the first openly transgender person to stand for elected office in the Republic of Ireland.

=== Healthcare ===
Access to gender-affirming healthcare has been a documented concern for trans people in Ireland. The National Gender Service (NGS), based in Dublin, is the only public provider of gender-affirming care for adults in the Republic; a 2022 Transgender Europe report ranked Ireland last in the European Union for availability and accessibility of trans healthcare. A 2024 research report by Belong To found that one in three trans adults waited at least three years for a first appointment, with waiting times at the NGS reaching an estimated thirteen years by the end of 2024. In December 2025, the NGS announced it would close its waiting list to new clients from March 2026, citing a lack of resources; the HSE subsequently issued a statement asserting that the NGS did not have the authority to close the list. In June 2026, Trans Healthcare Action and the Sexual Health Centre in Cork launched Kindred Clinic Cork, Ireland's first peer-led trans healthcare pilot, offering free, gender-affirming care outside the NGS model. Also in June 2026, the government established a Policy and Oversight Group for Gender Healthcare, co-chaired by the Minister for Health and the Minister for Mental Health, to develop a new model of care.

=== Debates around the Gender Recognition Act ===
From around 2020, a number of organisations emerged in Ireland opposing the self-declaration model of the Gender Recognition Act 2015, including LGB Alliance Ireland and The Countess (formerly The Countess Didn't Fight For This). Questions were raised about the provenance of these organisations; trans activist Noah Halpin identified that the LGB Alliance Ireland's account was registered to a London address, reported by Gay Community News. Legal scholar Sandra Duffy has analysed these dynamics through a postcolonial lens, arguing that the trans rights debate in Ireland became a site of contested national identity, with both pro- and anti-trans groups appealing to Irish nationalist iconography to legitimise their positions, and noting that trans people were active participants in the campaigns for marriage equality in 2015 and the repeal of the Eighth Amendment in 2018. In June 2022, a controversy on RTÉ's Liveline programme involving The Countess and the National Women's Council of Ireland prompted Dublin Pride to end its media partnership with RTÉ.

=== Northern Ireland ===
Trans people in Northern Ireland are subject to the Gender Recognition Act 2004, the United Kingdom legislation, rather than the Republic's 2015 Act. The 2004 Act requires applicants to demonstrate a diagnosis of gender dysphoria, two years living in their acquired gender, and approval from a Gender Recognition Panel. Ellen Murray founded GenderJam, a trans youth service, and the Belfast Trans Resource Centre through SAIL NI. The history of the LGBTQ+ community in Northern Ireland was explored in the BBC Northern Ireland documentary Outlasting (2025), directed by Lewis Doherty, which featured LGBTQ+ elders including activist Jeffrey Dudgeon.

== Timeline ==
=== 12th century ===
c. 1188 – Gerald of Wales records gender-variant individuals at the courts of Limerick and Connacht in Topographia Hibernica.

=== 19th century ===
1865 – James Barry, Cork-born military surgeon, dies having lived his entire adult life as a man. 1871 – Patrick McCormack dies at the North Dublin Workhouse; the first recorded Dublin-born trans man. 1879 – Edward De Lacy Evans, born in County Kilkenny, is outed in Australia after admission to Bendigo Hospital. 1889 – John Bradley is imprisoned at Grangegorman after disclosing his assignment at birth.

=== 20th century ===
1916 – Eva Gore-Booth and Esther Roper co-found Urania, a privately circulated journal arguing against gender binaries. 1946 – Michael Dillon becomes the first documented trans man to undergo phalloplasty and publishes Self: A Study in Ethics and Endocrinology. 1950 – Dillon performs an orchiectomy on Roberta Cowell, enabling her to become the first known British trans woman to undergo sex reassignment surgery. 1997 – Lydia Foy begins legal proceedings against the Registrar-General after her application to amend her birth certificate is refused.

=== 21st century ===
2006 – Transgender Equality Network of Ireland (TENI) is founded. 2007 – High Court issues the first Irish declaration of incompatibility with the European Convention on Human Rights in Foy v An t-Ard Chláraitheoir. 15 July 2015 – Gender Recognition Act 2015 is enacted, making Ireland the fourth country globally to adopt a self-declaration model for legal gender recognition. September 2017 – Jack Murphy becomes the first trans character in an Irish soap opera, appearing in Fair City. December 2023 – Saoirse Mackin becomes the first openly trans person to stand for elected office in the Republic of Ireland. October 2024 – Barbie Kardashian is found not guilty on all charges relating to alleged threats at Limerick Prison. 2025 – Proposed amendment to the Gender Recognition Act 2015 relating to imprisonment passes its first legislative stage.

== See also ==
- LGBT rights in the Republic of Ireland
- Transgender rights in the United Kingdom
- Gender Recognition Act 2015
- Lydia Foy
- James Barry (surgeon)
- Michael Dillon
- Transgender Equality Network of Ireland
- Transgender history in the United Kingdom
- Topographia Hibernica
- Urania (journal)
- Eva Gore-Booth
- The Abbot of Drimnagh
