= Child and Family Agency (Formerly Health Service Executive) v OA =

Supreme Court of Ireland case

Child and Family Agency (Tusla) v OA
- Coat of arms of Ireland
- Court: Supreme Court of Ireland
- Full case name: Child and Family Agency (formerly Health Service Executive) v O.A. 2015
- Decided: 23rd of June 2015
- Citation: [2015] IESC 52 [2015] 2 ILRM 145 [2015] 2 IR 718

Case history
- Prior actions: Appealed by appellant from the District Court to the High Court, then appealed to the Supreme Court before being withdrawn by appellant. Revisited by District Court, then appealed to Circuit Court and stated to the Supreme Court by the Circuit Court.
- Related action: HSE v OA [2013] 4 JIC 1205

Court membership
- Judges sitting: Murray J, O'Donnell J, MacMenamin J, Laffoy J, McKechnie J

Case opinions
- Remitted to Circuit Court with Supreme Court's decision for consideration.
- Decision by: MacMenamin J

Keywords
- Constitution; Personal Rights; Child protection; Costs; Legal aid

Child and Family Agency (formerly Health Service Executive) v O.A. [2015] IESC 52, also known as Child and Family Agency (Tusla) v OA, is an Irish Supreme Court case which determined the appropriateness of awarding costs in child care cases where there was an unsuccessful parental challenge to an application made by the Child and Family Agency (CFA). The Supreme Court established that there are circumstances where it might be suitable to award costs to unsuccessful parents who privately retained legal counsel; these being if the CFA "acted capriciously, arbitrarily or unreasonably in commencing or maintaining the proceedings", if "the outcome was particularly clear or compelling", or if it would be "particularly unjust towards the parents to award costs against them". It was stated that the District Court must outline its reasoning regarding a decision to award costs in such cases, holding that the Circuit Court should only reverse District Court decisions if the outlined principles and criteria are not followed.

== Background ==
=== History ===
==== Summary of procedures ====
This case was brought under the provisions found in the Child Care Act 1991, part (iv). The case first appeared in the District Court, but it was brought to the High Court by the CFA's statutory predecessor (HSE) following intentions to award costs. The High Court ruled against the HSE and the case was appealed to the Supreme Court. The appeal was withdrawn and the application was heard again in the District Court, where costs were indeed awarded. This order was appealed to the Circuit Court, whereupon it was stated to the Supreme Court for determination in accordance with section 16 of the Courts of Justice Act 1947.

==== Facts of the case ====
The appellant was the CFA or Tusla, previously HSE, and the respondent was a mother of four, referred to in the case as "OA".The circumstances of the case began in April 2011, when the HSE acted on claims that OA had physically abused her daughter, "AA", who moved in with a third party. The HSE applied for an emergency care order, which was granted, and OA retained the services of a private solicitor. The HSE had yet to apply for a full care order in November 2011, by which time the situation at OA's home had "radically changed", with AA returning and withdrawing all charges. On November 28, the HSE applied for a supervision order, which was eventually granted despite dispute by OA as the emergency care order elapsed. This supervision order ran its course on March 5, 2012. However, on April 25, 2012, the HSE applied again for a supervision order claiming that OA's other three children were being left at home unsupervised. This order was also granted.

==== Application for costs ====
OA's solicitor nonetheless applied for costs, claiming that OA had been successful in several applications. The HSE noted that OA was entitled to legal aid and contested that the District Court "no jurisdiction to award costs in the circumstances" and applied to the High Court ([2015] IEHC 172). The High Court determined against the HSE, who appealed to the Supreme Court. Meanwhile the District Court granted an order to award costs but according to MacMenamin J., "did not identify any exceptional feature of the case to justify" this decision. The HSE appealed to the Circuit Court regarding the order for costs. The Supreme Court appeal was withdrawn on April 29, 2014. The Circuit Court judge, Nolan J., intended to reverse the District Court's award of costs, referring to the United Kingdom Supreme Court decision of Re T (Children) (Care Proceedings; Costs) [2012] UKSC 36 where costs were not awarded because the equivalent child care authority had acted appropriately. However, the judge agreed to state the case to the Supreme Court.

==== Supreme Court ====
The case, now centered on the circumstances of the District Court's award of costs against the appellant (CFA), combined with its predecessor, had now previously appeared before the courts at every level in the legal system of the Republic of Ireland (except the then-new Court of Appeal). Supreme Court judge MacMenamin J. noted this "extraordinary" detail of the case, as well as the unusual circumstance in which a "question of discretion" (referring to the matter of awarding costs) "should be characterised as an issue of law".

There were two questions submitted by Circuit Court judge Nolan J. to be answered; the first question centred around whether it was an acceptable use of the Circuit Court judge’s discretion to allow the appellant to appeal against the awarding costs to the respondent, when it was found that the appellant did not engage in misconduct nor did it act unreasonably, arbitrarily or capriciously. The second question concerned whether it was suitable for the judge to consider the rationale found in the UK case of Re T (Children) (Care Proceedings; Costs) when making the decision that costs should not be awarded against the CFA.

MacMenamin J. commented that the solicitor's description of the cases as being "successful" from OA's perspective was unconvincing, questioning "when, if at all, it would be appropriate to award costs to a party for whom the outcome has been largely unsuccessful". He also regarded the approach taken by the District and Circuit Courts as "general, or inflexible" given the context. Finally, he restated the importance of the subject, namely of balancing proper legal proceedings with the "high degrees of skill" required for child law cases, protecting child welfare, and addressing Constitutional questions of legal representation.

== Holding of the Supreme Court ==
MacMenamin J. was of the view that, in general, parents in District Court child care cases should not be granted an order awarding costs, unless distinct features were present in the cases in question. The same judge articulated that these distinct features included circumstances such as:

"(i) A conclusion that the CFA had acted capriciously, arbitrarily or unreasonably in commencing or maintaining the proceedings;

(ii) Where the outcome of the case was particularly clear and compelling;

(iii) Where a particular injustice would be visited on the parents, or another party, if they were left to bear the costs, having regard to the length and complexity of the proceedings;

(iv) In any case in which a District Court seeks to depart from the general default position, and to award costs, it is necessary to give reasons. These reasons must identify some clear feature or issue in the case which rendered the case truly exceptional. It is true all cases are distinct, but not all cases are exceptional. The reason for the distinction rendering a costs order justified must go to whether or not there was some unusual or unprecedented issue, or issues, which required determination or whether the case properly, and within jurisdiction, determined a point that had application to a range of other cases."

Regarding the Circuit Court's first question, MacMenamin J. held that, with regard to the above, the Circuit Court should only reverse decisions made by the District Court "if there is a departure from the principles and criteria identified in this judgment".

The case was remitted to the Circuit Court to allow it to apply the aforementioned principles.

== Subsequent developments ==
As the Supreme Court's decision was binding and altered courts' future approach to awarding costs when it came to the Child and Family Agency; this case was influential in deciding several future cases.

== See also ==
Courts of the Republic of Ireland

Health Service Executive

Tusla
