= Child and Family Agency (formerly Health Service Executive) v O.A. =

Supreme Court of Ireland case

Child and Family Agency (Tusla) v OA
- Coat of arms of Ireland
- Court: Supreme Court of Ireland
- Full case name: Child and Family Agency (formerly Health Service Executive) v O.A. 2015
- Decided: 23 June 2015
- Citation: https://www.bailii.org/ie/cases/IESC/2015/S52.html

Case history
- Prior actions: Appealed by appellant from the District Court to the High Court, then appealed to the Supreme Court before being withdrawn by appellant. Revisited by District Court, then appealed to Circuit Court and stated to the Supreme Court by the Circuit Court.
- Appealed from: High Court, Circuit Court
- Appealed to: Supreme Court
- Related action: HSE v OA [2013] 4 JIC 1205

Court membership
- Judges sitting: Murray J, O'Donnell J, MacMenamin J, Laffoy J, McKechnie J

Case opinions
- The Supreme Court case centered on why the District Court gave the appellant Child and Family Agency (CFA) costs. Judge Nolan asked two questions: is it okay or right for the Circuit Court to let the appellant's appeal against an order for costs made against it, after looking at all the facts and finding that the appellant hadn't done anything wrong? MacMenamin J. argued that it was important to find a balance between proper legal procedures and the high levels of skill needed in child law cases to protect the welfare of children and deal with constitutional questions about legal representation. He suggested that parents should not get a cost order in District Court child care cases unless there are specific features to the case in question, such as a decision that the CFA started or kept the proceedings without good reason, arbitrarily, or capriciously. It was also suggested that the Circuit Court should only overturn decisions made by the District Court if there is a deviation from the guidelines and standards outlined in this judgment. The case was sent back to the Circuit Court so that the above principles could be applied.
- Decision by: MacMenamin J

Keywords
- Constitution; Personal Rights; Child protection; Costs; Legal aid

Child and Family Agency (formerly Health Service Executive) v O.A. [2015] IESC 52, also known as Child and Family Agency (Tusla) v OA, is a reported Irish Supreme Court case decision. It was decided that parents should not get an order for costs in the District Court unless there are specific elements in the case at hand. The Supreme Court set up these specific points and ruled that the Circuit Court should only overturn District Court decisions if they do not follow the principles and criteria set out.

== Background ==
=== History ===
The case was first heard in the District Court, but the Health Service Executive (HSE), which was the legal predecessor to the Child and Family Agency (CFA or Tusla), took it to the High Court because it wanted to award costs. The HSE lost in the High Court, so the case went to the Supreme Court. The case was heard again in the District Court, and costs were given. The appeal was dropped. The Circuit Court questioned this order, and Section 16 of the Courts of Justice Act of 1947. It was then sent to the Supreme Court to be decided.

==== Context of the case ====
The CFA filed the appeal. The respondent was a mother of four, whose name was referred to in the case as O.A.

In April 2011, the HSE looked into claims that O.A. had physically abused her daughter, A.A., who had moved in with a third party. The HSE asked for an emergency care order, which was granted, and O.A. hired a private solicitor. The HSE had not yet asked for a full care order in November 2011. By that time, the situation at O.A.'s home had "radically changed" because A.A. had returned and dropped all charges. On November 28, the HSE asked for a supervision order, which was eventually granted, despite O.A.'s objections, because the emergency care order had ended. This supervision order ran out on March 5, 2012. But on April 25, 2012, the HSE tried again to get a supervision order, saying that O.A.'s other three children were being left alone at home. This order was also granted.

==== Application for costs ====
Still, O.A.'s lawyer asked for costs, saying that O.A. had won several applications. O.A. qualified for legal aid, and the HSE argued that the District Court did not have the capacity to grant costs in this situation. They then went to the High Court. The HSE lost in the High Court, so it went to the Supreme Court. In the meantime, the District Court gave an order for costs, but MacMenamin J. said that there was nothing special about the case that made this decision necessary. The HSE took the order to pay costs to the Circuit Court. On April 29, 2014, the Supreme Court appeal was dropped. The Circuit Court judge, Nolan J., wanted to take back the costs that the District Court had given. He did this by citing a United Kingdom ruling in which costs were not given because the equivalent child care authority had acted suitably. But the judge agreed to state the case to the Supreme Court.

==== Supreme Court ====
The case now centered on why the District Court gave the appellant Child and Family Agency (CFA) costs. The appellant and its predecessor had already been in front of courts at every level of the Republic of Ireland's legal system (except the then-new Court of Appeal). MacMenamin J. took note of this "extraordinary" part of the case, as well as the fact that it was unusual for a discretionary question to be considered a legal issue.

Judge Nolan of the Circuit Court asked two questions:

1. As a judge of the Circuit Court, is it okay or right for me on appeal from the District Court, to let the appellant's appeal against an order for costs made against it, after looking at all the facts and finding that the appellant hadn't done anything wrong or acted in an unreasonable, arbitrary, or capricious way in proceedings brought under part (iv) of the Child Care Act, 1991?
2. In response to an appeal made by the Child and Family Agencythe District Court's decision to give costs to the respondent, can I use the reasoning in Re T (Children) (Care Proceedings; Costs) to decide that costs should not be granted against the appellant?

MacMenamin J. said the lawyer's claim that the cases were "successful" from O.A.'s perspective did not make sense. He asked if there was ever a time when it would be fair to give costs to a party whose case was largely unsuccessful. He also thought that the way the District and Circuit Courts did things was too "general" or "rigid" for the situation. Last, he talked about how important the topic was once more. He said that it was important to find a balance between proper legal procedures and thehigh levels of skill" needed in child law cases to protect the welfare of children and deal with Constitutional questions about legal representation.

== Holding of the Supreme Court. ==
MacMenamin J. thought that the commencement should be that parents shouldn't get a cost order in District Court child care cases unless there are specific features to the case in question. For example:

(i) A decision that the CFA started or kept the proceedings without good reason, arbitrarily, or capriciously;

(ii) Where the case's outcome was very clear and transparent

(iii) where, given the duration and complexity of the procedures, leaving the parental figures or external parties to bear the costs would be unfair;

(iv) Any time a District Court wants to go against the general rule and award costs, it has to explain why. These reasons must point to a clear part or issue of the case that made it truly special. All cases are different, however not every instance is extraordinary.. The difference that makes a costs order justified has to do with whether or not there was an unusual or never-before-seen issue or issues that needed to be decided or whether the case was properly decided and within its scope of jurisdiction determined a point that applied to many different types of cases.

MacMenamin J. said, in response to the Circuit Court's first question, that the Circuit Court should only overturn decisions made by the District Court if there is a deviation from the guidelines and standards outlined in this judgment.

The case was sent back to the Circuit Court so that the above principles could be applied.

== Subsequent developments ==
The Supreme Court's decision was final and changed how courts would decide costs in the future when it came to the Child and Family Agency. This case had an effect on how many other cases were decided.

== See also ==
- Courts of the Republic of Ireland
- Health Service Executive
- Tusla
