= LGBTQ history in Ireland =

The history of lesbian, gay, bisexual and transgender people on the island of Ireland.

== Pre-independence ==
James Barry (c.1789–1865), assigned female at birth, "lived much of their life as a man" and became a military surgeon who performed one of the first-known successful Caesarean sections.

One of the first recorded trans individuals in Dublin was a 19th-century trans man Patrick McCormack (c.1821–1871), who worked as a labourer and lived in Castleknock. Another 19th-century trans man was Albert Cashier (born Jennie Hodgers, 1843–1915) from County Louth, who fought on the Union side of the American Civil War.

=== Writers ===
In the 19th and 20th centuries, Ireland was home to several notable gay and lesbian writers, including Oscar Wilde, Eva Selina Gore-Booth, Elizabeth Bowen, Kate O'Brien, Ladies of Llangollen, Somerville and Ross and Mary Dorcey.

=== Legal situation ===
Prior to formal Irish independence in 1922, sexuality in Ireland was governed by the UK-wide laws emitted from the Parliament of the United Kingdom such as the Offences Against the Person Act 1861. These laws were automatically inherited by the new Irish Free State. The most notable legal event related to Irish natives was the trial and imprisonment of Oscar Wilde. Some leaders of the Irish Independence struggle of the early 20th century were assumed - at the time or later - to be gay, notably Padraig Pearse and Roger Casement whose sexuality was an element in his trial and execution.

== Post-independence in Republic of Ireland ==
After independence, Ireland became a very insular society, dominated by the Catholic Church and was conservative, however in the midst of this, there was an acceptance of homosexuality of those within the acting profession such as Micheál MacLiammóir. It was widely accepted that Micheál MacLiammóir was gay and that his longtime life partner was Hilton Edwards. MacLíammóir would even appear on Irish TV in the 1950s and 1960s performing in drag. It is because of this that Irish people were never really surprised to see men dressing up as women on TV and even today, one of Dublin's drag queens, Shirley Temple Bar, presents bingo on prime-time national TV. MacLíammóir, when talking to Irish playwright Mary Manning, claimed to have had a homosexual relationship with General Eoin O'Duffy, former Garda Síochána commissioner and head of the quasi-fascist Blueshirts in Ireland, during the 1930s. The claim was revealed publicly by RTÉ in a documentary, The Odd Couple, broadcast in 1999. However, MacLíammóir's claims have not been substantiated by any evidence.

=== Economic development and civil unions ===
Following the killing of Declan Flynn, a gay man targeted in a homophobic assault in Fairview Park on the evening of September 9, 1982, five individuals were apprehended for his murder, confessing to their intent to "rid the park of homosexuals." Despite their admissions, all five received suspended sentences on March 8, 1983, sparking widespread anger within Dublin's queer community. This injustice led to Dublin's first large-scale LGBTQ+ demonstration on March 19, 1983, where approximately 400 activists marched from Liberty Hall to Fairview Park to voice their fury and demand accountability. Declan Flynn's murder and the subsequent protest were pivotal in energizing the LGBTQ+ rights movement in the Republic of Ireland, pushing for systemic change and acknowledgment of the discrimination faced by the community.

In the 1970s, the Campaign for Homosexual Law Reform in the Republic of Ireland was led by David Norris, the first openly gay politician to be elected to public office in Ireland, who campaigned for then-current criminalization of homosexuality (namely those in force from 1861 and 1885) to be dismantled. In 1980, the case was taken before the Supreme Court of Ireland; losing the case, Norris took the case to the European Court of Human Rights, which ruled in 1988 against the Irish government. The laws were finally reformed in 1993 by then-Minister for Justice Máire Geoghegan-Quinn.

With the emergence of the Celtic Tiger economy from 1995 onwards, Ireland underwent a massive transformation both economically and socially. The individual wealth of the average Irish citizen quadrupled in the space of 15 years along with EU membership helped to liberalise and make this once conservative and religious society into one that is more open and pro-gay rights with a raft of pro-gay legislation. 76% of the Irish population support full gay marriage being extended to same-sex couples while 53% support the idea of same-sex adoption.

In 2011, civil partnership legislation was passed by the Dáil and Seanad and was enacted into law. Also, in 2011, Dominic Hannigan and John Lyons, both of the Labour Party, became the first openly gay TDs to be elected to the Dail, and Katherine Zappone became the first openly lesbian senator.

In 2015, Ireland became the first country in the world to legalise gay marriage through a referendum, with yes winning by over 62% of the vote. In a total over two million adults voted, and it was found that many younger adults participated in this vote to bring Ireland into a new era.

In 2017, Leo Varadkar was elected Taoiseach (Prime Minister), making him the youngest and first openly gay leader of Ireland.

== Post-independence in Northern Ireland ==
On 13 January 2020 same sex marriage became legal in Northern Ireland, anyone who married outside of Northern Ireland had their marriages officially recognized that day, and the first ceremonies inside the country started in February 2020.

== See also ==
- LGBT history
- Campaign for Homosexual Law Reform
- Oscar Wilde
