= Engineering Design and Management v. Burton =

Irish Supreme Court case

Tracey, T/A Engineering Design & Management v Burton
- Coat of arms of Ireland
- Court: Supreme Court of Ireland
- Full case name: Kevin Tracey, T/A Engineering Design & Management (Appellant) v Michael Burton, Charles O'Connor, and Burton & O'Connor Limited, and Fpq Consulting Engineers (Respondents)
- Decided: 25 April 2016
- Citation: [2016] IESC 16

Case history
- Appealed from: Tracey T/A Engineering Design & Management v Burton (unreported, High Court, 6 December 2010)

Court membership
- Judges sitting: MacMenamin J, Denham CJ, Charleton J

Case opinions
- The constitutional right of access to the courts, although an important one, is not an absolute right. In all legal proceedings a point may be reached where the conduct of such litigation is so delayed, or so vexatious, or proceeds in a manner which either breaks or ignores rules of procedure, or where there is such significant misconduct either before court, or in court itself, as to raise questions as to whether the right of access to the court should be limited, or, in extreme cases, whether a case should be dismissed.
- Decision by: MacMenamin J
- Concurrence: Denham CJ, Charleton J

Keywords
- Dismissal of proceedings; Access to justice; Jurisdiction to dismiss; Defamation

Tracey, T/A Engineering Design & Management v Burton, [2016] IESC 16, was an Irish Supreme Court case in which the Supreme Court considered the Irish courts' ability to limit the right of access to the courts and, in extreme cases, to dismiss (strike out) proceedings.

== Background ==
The appellant (Mr Tracey) brought proceedings against the respondents in the High Court seeking damages and financial loss following the termination of a contract. The High Court judge (Kearns P) held that the relevant case did not involve defamation proceedings and that the appellant had no right to a jury trial. As a result, Kearns P ordered that the case be transferred from the jury list to the non-jury list (and so would not be heard by a jury) and ordered that the appellant pay the respondents' costs. The appellant was not present or represented during the High Court proceedings and at the time failed to give the court an explanation as to his absence that was satisfactory to the High Court judge (the High Court judge having previously notified the appellant that his claim might be dismissed in the event of no proper medical certificate being produced to explain his absence).

Rather than applying to have the High Court decision set aside (on the basis that the order should not have been made by Kearns P in the appellant's absence), the appellant appealed to the Supreme Court claiming that his case did involve issues of defamation and that the High Court judge was biased against him.

== Holding of the Supreme Court ==
=== Defamation and bias ===
MacMenamin J delivered the only written judgment for the Supreme Court (with which the other judges agreed). The Supreme Court rejected the appellant's argument that the High Court judge had been biased or that he had in any way acted improperly.

The order that the High Court made was not one to dismiss the appellant's claim, but was, rather, a much less significant procedural order that the case be transferred to the non-jury list. The Supreme Court held that such a procedural order to transfer the case to the non-jury list was correct as these proceedings could not properly be characterised as defamation proceedings. While there exists a right to a jury trial in cases of defamation, defamation requires "explicit and clear pleading", something that was not done in this case. In the absence of any such pleading the Supreme Court noted that "[i]t does not lie within the power of this Court to now, effectively, 'transform' this claim into 'defamation proceedings', or even a 'part-defamation' proceedings."

=== Access to justice ===
MacMenamin J took the opportunity "to provide guidance" on the courts' ability to limit the right of access to the courts and, in extreme cases, to dismiss proceedings. Alluding to recent incidents that had occurred in other court proceedings, MacMenamin J noted that it was "necessary to reiterate some matters which are fundamental". These are that:

"[i]n all legal proceedings, whether a litigant is legally represented or not, a point may be reached where the conduct of such litigation is so dilatory, or so vexatious, or proceeds in a manner which either breaks or ignores rules of procedure, or where there is such egregious misconduct either before court, or in court itself, as to raise questions as to whether the right of access to the court should be limited, or, in extreme cases, whether a case should actually be struck out. Put simply, the questions are whether there is abuse of process to such a degree that a claim simply should not be allowed to proceed, or whether such a claim should be allowed to proceed only under identified procedural conditions, or in a manner proportionate to the circumstances, while seeking, as far as is practicable, to vindicate that constitutional right to litigate proceedings."

The fact that an appellant represents themselves in court does not alter the duties owed to that court, or the obligation to comply with the rules of court. Citing from the case of O'Reilly McCabe v. Minister for Justice,& Patrick Cusack Smith & Co (Agents of Thomas McCabe, Ward of Court & Minor), MacMenamin J noted that "the constitutional right of access to the courts, while an important right, is not an absolute one" The courts must also protect the rights of opposing parties, the principle of finality of litigation, the resources of the courts and the right to fair procedures enjoyed by every party to a litigation.

MacMenamin J also noted that, subject to the provisions of the Constitution, the courts can assist litigants and their legal representatives "by considering the papers in a case beforehand; by sifting through the documentation in order to see what is relevant and what is not; by identifying the issues which truly fall to be decided; and by directing whatever written submissions may be necessary in order to ensure justice is done, effectively and efficiently". However, at the same time, litigants and their legal representatives must abide by the rules of the court or run the risk of having conditions placed on the litigation, or being faced by a more radical sanction such as wasted costs orders, a postponement of proceedings or a dismissal of those proceedings for abuse of process.

=== Conclusion ===
While the Supreme Court agreed with the order made by the High Court judge that the case be transferred to the non-jury list, MacMenamin J also noted a residual concern that "justice be seen to be done". As a result, the Supreme Court set aside only the part of the High Court judgement and order where costs had been awarded against the appellant in the appellant's absence. Noting that the Supreme Court had given the appellant "an extraordinary degree of latitude", MacMenamin J sent back the remainder of the proceedings to the High Court to be dealt with as a non-jury case.
