= Goold v Collins =

Irish Supreme Court case

Goold v. Collins & Others
- Coat of arms of Ireland
- Court: Supreme Court of Ireland
- Full case name: Eileen Goold v. Mary Collins, A Judge of the Dublin Metropolitan District Court and the Director of Public Prosecutions, Ireland and the Attorney General and John Joseph (Orse, Jackie) Gallagher.
- Decided: 12 July 2004
- Citations: Eileen Goold v Collins & Others [2004] IESC 38, [2004] 7 JIC 1201

Case history
- Appealed from: High Court
- Appealed to: Supreme Court

Court membership
- Judges sitting: Hardiman J, Geoghegan J, Fennelly J

Case opinions
- Decision by: Mr Justice Adrian Hardiman

Keywords
- Constitution; Personal Rights; Right to Life; Unborn; Right to Travel; Abortion; Suicide; Injunction

Goold v Collins and Ors [2004] IESC 38, [2004] 7 JIC 1201 is an Irish Supreme Court case in which the Court ruled that a statutory provision's constitutionality may be reviewed only at the behest of a litigant who is contesting some current application of that provision.

== Background ==
Eileen Goold had been the subject of a protection order, dated 18 September 2002, compelling her to restrain from violent behaviour towards her husband. In suspected violation of this order she was twice arrested. By agreement with her husband, this order was discharged on 21 November, and, the following day, her husband wrote to the police withdrawing his complaints. On 29 January 2003, the associated criminal charges against Goold were dismissed. On 17 December 2002, Goold obtained leave to apply to the High Court (McKechnie J.) for judicial review of the constitutionality of Section 5 of the Domestic Violence Act, 1996, on the authority of which, the protection order had been issued. The State argued that these proceedings should be disallowed due to their mootness. On succeeding only in part before the High Court, the State appealed to the Supreme Court.

== Holding of the Supreme Court ==
In the earlier case of DK v Crowley, the Court had found other provisions of the Domestic Violence Act relating to orders barring a spouse from the family home to be unconstitutional for:

"[F]ailing to prescribe a fixed period of relatively short duration during which an interim barring order made ex parte is to continue in force, deprived the respondents to such applications of the protection of the principle of audi alteram partem in a manner and to an extent which is disproportionate, unreasonable and unnecessary."

The Court distinguished DK v Crowley on the basis that, at the time of the application for judicial review of the underlying legislation, no agreement had been reached regarding the order in question. Noting the 'vital social purpose' served by domestic violence legislation, the Court referred to the Canadian case of Borowski v. Canada where the Supreme Court of Canada held that:

"[A]n appeal is moot when a decision will not have the effect of resolving some controversy affecting or potentially affecting the rights of the parties. Such a live controversy must be present not only when the action or proceedings is commenced but also when the Court is called upon to reach a decision."

Writing for the Court, Hardiman J. allowed the State's appeal. He held that since there was not a live "concrete dispute between the parties" the case was moot and issued an order staying the proceedings.

== Subsequent developments ==
This case was applied in the cases of LOG v Child and Family Agency [2017] IEHC 58 and MC v Legal Aid Board [2017] IEHC 26.
