= Transgender rights in the Republic of Ireland =

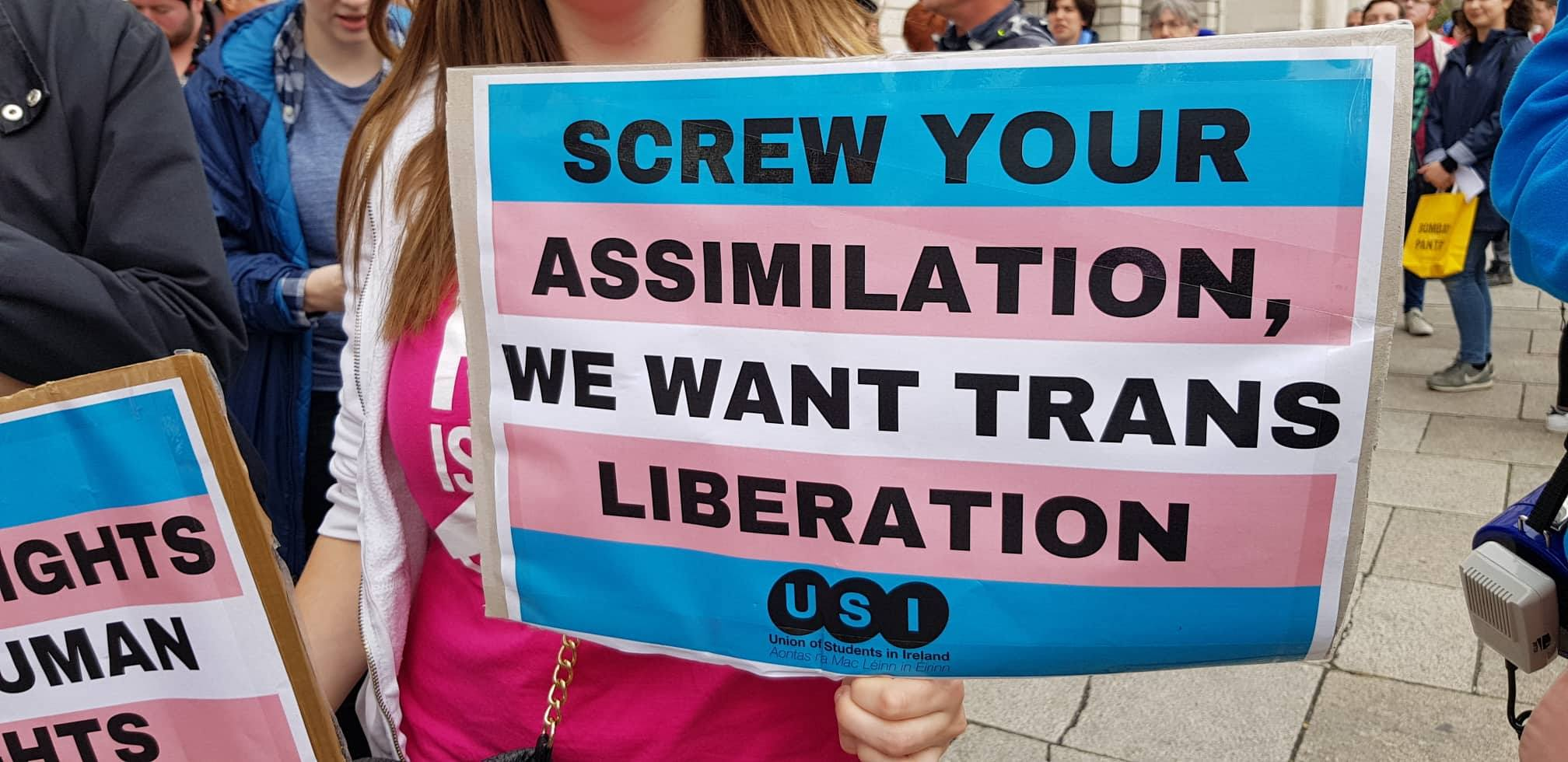
Transgender protest sign in Dublin reads: "Screw your assimilation, we want trans liberation." 2018

A citizen of Ireland is legally permitted to change the designation of their gender on government documents through self-determination. In 2015, Ireland was the fourth state in the world to permit such alterations to government documents. By May 2017, 230 people had been granted gender recognition certificates under the law. Section 16 of the Act entitles the holder of a gender recognition certificate to apply to have the certificate amended if there is a clerical error or an error of fact in the content of the certificate. Two such corrections have been made since commencement of the Act.

There are currently no laws to recognize non-binary gender.

== History ==
In 2002, Lydia Foy applied to the High Court to change her gender on her birth certification. The application was rejected on the ground that the birth certificate was deemed to be a historical document. Foy took new proceedings to the High Court relying on the decisions of the European Court of Human Rights in the Goodwin and "I" cases. Her application was heard between 17 and 26 April 2007. Judgment was given on 19 October 2007. The Judge held that the Irish State had failed to respect Foy's rights under Article 8 of the European Convention on Human Rights by not providing any mechanism for her to obtain a new birth certificate designating her gender as female. He indicated that he would grant a declaration that Irish law in this area was incompatible with the Convention. He also said he would have found her right to marry under Article 12 of the Convention had been infringed as well if that had been relevant. On 14 February 2008, the Judge granted a declaration that sections of the Civil Registration Act 2004 were incompatible with Article 8 of the Convention. This was the first declaration of incompatibility made under the European Convention on Human Rights Act passed in 2003.

The Government of Ireland initially appealed the court's decision but dropped its appeal. The Government set up an advisory group of civil servants to make recommendations for new legislation. The advisory group's report was published in July 2011, There was some controversy over some of its recommendations, notably that married transgender persons would have to divorce before they could be recognised in their new gender. At the launch of the report, the Minister responsible stated that the Government would introduce gender recognition legislation as soon as possible.

Since no legislation had been introduced by February 2013, Foy issued new proceedings in the High Court. She sought a declaration that the State was obliged to issue her with a new birth certificate designating her gender as female, or that the State was in breach of the Irish Constitution or the European Convention on Human Rights because it had failed to provide her with an effective remedy for the violation of her rights.

On 15 July 2015, the Oireachtas passed the Gender Recognition Act 2015 which permits an Irish citizen to amend their gender on government documents through self-determination. The law does not require any medical intervention by the applicant nor an assessment by the state. Such amendments are possible through self-determination for any person aged 18 or over who is ordinarily resident in Ireland and/or registered on Irish registers of birth or adoption. Persons aged 16 to 18 years must secure a court order to exempt them from the normal requirement to be at least 18.

In November 2022, charity network Transgender Europe found that wait times for access to a first appointment for gender affirming healthcare in Ireland ranged from 2.5 years to 10 years. It further found that Ireland had only one public trans health provider, which was severely understaffed, and that patients seeking care there were reportedly denied for reasons including being on social welfare, having a diagnosis of ADHD, or not answering a series of "highly sexualized questions" in "the right way", leading many Irish trans people to turn to alternative methods of securing healthcare including the private sector and self-administering hormone therapy. Advocacy group Trans and Intersex Pride Dublin's response was to advocate for an informed consent model of healthcare access, saying "Trans people should be empowered to make decisions about their transition themselves".

== See also ==
- LGBT rights in the Republic of Ireland
- Transgender rights
