= Lydia Foy =

Irish transgender activist

Lydia Annice Foy
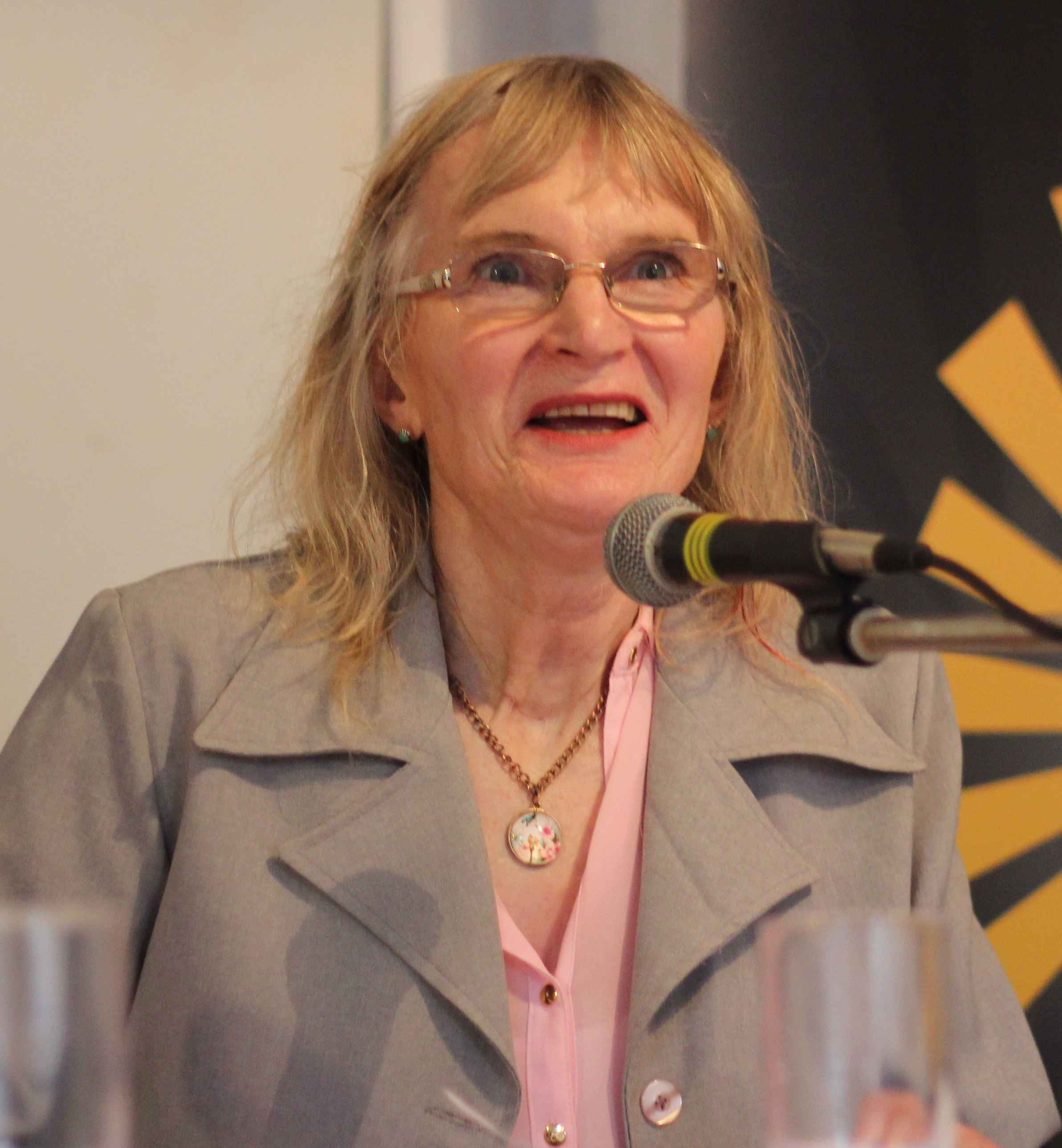
- Foy in 2015
- Born: 23 June 1947 (age 79); Midlands, Ireland
- Education: University College Dublin (bachelor's degree in dental surgery, 1971)
- Occupation: Dentist (retired)
- Known for: Transgender rights activism
- Spouse: Anne Naughton (m. 1977; sep. 1991)

Lydia Annice Foy is an Irish trans woman notable for leading legal challenges regarding gender recognition in Ireland. In 1992, Foy had sex reassignment surgery, and began a 20-year battle to have her birth certificate reflect her gender identity. In 2007, the High Court ruled that the relevant portions of the Irish law were incompatible with the European Convention on Human Rights. By February 2013, the law had not been changed and she began new proceedings to enforce the 2007 decision. The Gender Recognition Act 2015 allowed for the recognition of change of gender and provided for gender recognition certificates.

== Early life and marriage ==
Foy is a retired dentist from Athy, County Kildare. Born in a private nursing home in the Midland Region, Foy had five brothers and one sister.

From early childhood Foy was conscious of a feeling of 'femininity'. This continued throughout boarding school at Clongowes Wood College from 1960 to 1965. Having obtained the Leaving Certificate, Foy started pre-med studies at University College Dublin, but changed to dentistry a year later. Foy graduated with a Bachelor's degree in Dental Surgery in 1971, and began to practice as a dentist.

In 1975, when living in Athlone, Foy met Anne Naughton through a music society. Naughton was a secretary from Clara, County Offaly, who was eight years younger. They got engaged, and married at the Church of Saints Peter and Paul in Horseleap on 28 September 1977. They had two children, one born in 1978, and the other in 1980.

== Gender reassignment ==
In the 1980s Foy began to suffer physical and psychological problems, which worsened in August and September 1989, when she suffered a total collapse. She had psychiatric counselling, was diagnosed a transsexual, and was prescribed a course of hormone treatment. Foy attended two further psychiatrists in England who diagnosed her as suffering from gender dysphoria.

Foy then began a process of transitioning from male to female, with electrolysis, breast augmentation surgery, operations on the nose and Adams apple and voice surgery. On 25 July 1992, Foy underwent full, irreversible sex reassignment surgery in Brighton, England. This involved the removal of some external and internal genital tissues and surgical reconstruction of a vulva. The Irish Eastern Health Board paid £3,000 towards the cost of the procedure.

Subsequently, Foy lived entirely as a female. She had left the family home in 1990, and a judicial separation was granted on 13 December 1991. While Foy was at first granted conditional access to the children, who lived in custody of their mother, in May 1994 the Circuit Court prohibited all access.

While Foy, who legally changed her first names in November 1993, was able to obtain passport, driving license, medical card and polling card in the new name, her request to amend the sex on her birth certificate was refused.

== First court case ==
Foy v An t-Ard Chláraitheoir
- Court: High Court of Ireland
- Full case name: Foy -v- An t-Ard Chláraitheoir, Ireland and the Attorney General
- Decided: 19 October 2007
- Citation: [2007] IEHC 470

Case history
- Prior actions: Foy v. An t-Ard Chlaraitheoir & Ors [2002] IEHC 116

Court membership
- Judge sitting: Liam McKechnie

Foy began legal proceedings in April 1997, to challenge the refusal of the Registrar General to issue her with a new birth certificate. Unemployed, Foy was represented in the action by Free Legal Advice Centres. The basis of her action was a contention that the Births and Deaths Registration (Ireland) Act 1863 did not justify the practice of using solely biological indicators existing at the time of birth to determine sex for the purposes of registration. According to Foy, she had been born a "congenitally disabled woman" and the error recording her sex on her birth certificate was not only embarrassing to her but also could interfere with her constitutional rights, as she would be unable to ever choose to marry a man.

The case reached the High Court in October 2000. Foy's former wife and their daughters contested her plea, claiming that it could have "an adverse effect on their succession and other rights."

Judgment was reserved for nearly two years until 9 July 2002 when Mr Justice Liam McKechnie rejected Lydia Foy's challenge, stating that Foy had been born male based on medical and scientific evidence and that accordingly the registration could not be changed. He did express concern about the position of transsexuals in Ireland, however, and called on the government to urgently review the matter.

== Second court case ==
Just two days after the decision against Foy, the European Court of Human Rights in Strasbourg heard a similar case (Goodwin & I v United Kingdom). Christine Goodwin, a British transsexual, had claimed that the United Kingdom's refusal to allow her to amend her birth certificate and to marry as a female violated the European Convention on Human Rights. The Court declared that the UK Government had violated Article 8 and Article 12 of the convention. In response, Britain passed the Gender Recognition Act 2004, providing for legal recognition of transgender persons in their new or acquired gender, and for the issuing of new birth certificates reflecting that gender.

In 2005, the Foy case was sent back before the High Court by the Irish Supreme Court for further consideration. In the interim Ireland had passed the European Convention on Human Rights Act 2003 to give greater effect to the European Convention on Human Rights in Irish law. Relying on this, Foy made another application for a new birth certificate in November 2005 and when this was rejected, she issued new legal proceedings in the High Court in January 2006, referring to the Goodwin decision by the European Court of Human Rights. These proceedings were consolidated with the earlier case and the matter was heard again by Mr Justice McKechnie. On 19 October 2007, the court found Ireland in violation of the European Convention on Human Rights, and decided to issue the first declaration of incompatibility between Irish and European law. According to Justice Liam McKechnie, provisions of Article 8 of the Convention protecting Foy's right to respect for private life had been violated when the State failed "to provide for 'meaningful recognition' of her female identity". He also expressed frustration at the Irish government's failure to take any steps to improve the position of transsexuals following his previous judgment in 2002.

== Effect on law ==
Although the issues had been raised in parliamentary debate, no ruling had been made. The declaration of incompatibility could not override domestic law, but did place an onus on the government to reconcile Irish and European legislation.

On 5 January 2009, Thomas Hammarberg, the Human Rights Commissioner of the Council of Europe, stated with respect to the transgender community and specifically Foy that "there is no excuse for not immediately granting this community their full and unconditional human rights."

== Government challenge ==
Initially challenging the 2007 ruling, on 21 June 2010 the Irish Government withdrew its appeal and set up an inter-departmental committee on the legal recognition of transsexuals. The report of this Gender Recognition Advisory Group was published in July 2011 and recommended legislation to recognise transsexuals. Launching the report, the then Minister for Social Protection Joan Burton said the government would introduce gender recognition legislation as soon as possible, but by February 2013 no legislation had been introduced.

== Third court case ==
On 27 February 2013 Free Legal Advice Centres, representing Lydia Foy, announced that she had issued new proceedings in the Irish High Court seeking orders requiring the government to act on the judgment of Mr Justice McKechnie in 2007 and enable her to obtain a new birth certificate recognising her female gender.

== Other achievements ==
In 1997, Foy grew the world's largest foxglove in her garden.

In 2011, she was the subject of a documentary on RTÉ Radio 1 called My name is Lydia Foy.

In 2025, she was awarded the Jim Larkin Thirst for Justice Award by the Labour Party in recognition of her ‘decades long struggle for equality and State recognition for who she truly is.’

== See also ==
- LGBT rights in the Republic of Ireland
