= Legal status of transgender people =

Legal recognition of civil and human rights for transgender people

Laws concerning gender identity-expression by country or territory Legal identity change Legal identity change, surgery required No legal identity change Unknown/Ambiguous

The legal status of transgender people varies significantly around the world. Some countries have enacted laws protecting the rights of transgender individuals, but others have criminalized their gender identity or expression. In many cases, transgender individuals face discrimination in employment, housing, healthcare, and other areas of life. A transgender person is someone whose gender identity is not consistent with the sex they were assigned at birth and also with the gender role that is associated with that sex. They may have, or may intend to establish, a new gender status that accords with their gender identity. Transsexual is generally considered a subset of transgender, but some transsexual people reject being labelled transgender and vice versa.

Globally, most legal jurisdictions recognize the two traditional gender identities and social roles, man and woman, but tend to exclude any other gender identities and expressions. People assigned male at birth are usually legally recognized as men, and people assigned female at birth are usually legally recognized as women, in jurisdictions that distinguish between the two; however, there are some countries which recognize, by law, a third gender. That third gender is often associated with being nonbinary. There is now a greater understanding of the breadth of variation outside the typical categories of "man" and "woman", and many self-descriptions are now entering the literature, including pangender, genderqueer, polygender, and agender. Medically and socially, the term "transsexualism" is being replaced with gender incongruence, or gender dysphoria, and terms such as transgender people, trans men, and trans women, and non-binary are replacing the category of transsexual people.

Many of the issues regarding transgender rights are generally considered a part of family law, especially the issues of marriage and the question of a transgender person benefiting from a partner's insurance or social security. The degree of legal recognition provided to transgender people varies widely throughout the world. Many countries now legally recognize sex reassignments by permitting a change of legal gender on an individual's birth certificate. Many transsexual people have permanent surgery to change their body, gender-affirming surgery or semi-permanently change their body by hormonal means, transgender hormone therapy. The legal status of such healthcare varies. In many countries, some of these modifications are required for legal recognition. In a few, the legal aspects are directly tied to health care; i.e. the same bodies or doctors decide whether a person can move forward in their treatment and the subsequent processes automatically incorporate both matters. In others, these medical procedures are illegal.

The Yogyakarta Principles (2006) and Yogyakarta +10 (2017) affirm the right to self-determination and protection from medical abuses for trans and gender-diverse people. According to one study, opposition to transgender rights was correlated with a preference for obedience and conformity regardless of partisan affiliation. In some jurisdictions, transgender people (who are considered non-transsexual) can benefit from the legal recognition given to transsexual people. In some countries, an explicit medical diagnosis of "transsexualism" is (at least formally) necessary. In others, a diagnosis of "gender dysphoria", or simply the fact that one has established a non-conforming gender role, can be sufficient for some or all of the legal recognition available. The DSM-5 recognizes gender dysphoria as an official diagnosis. Not all transgender or transsexual people feel gender dysphoria or gender incongruence, but in many countries a diagnosis is required for legal recognition, if transgender people are legally recognized at all.

== Legislative efforts for the recognition of gender identity ==
=== National level ===
Country	Date	Gender identity/expression legislation	Upper house		Lower house		Head of state	Final outcome
Country	Date	Gender identity/expression legislation	Yes	No	Yes	No	Head of state	Final outcome
Germany	1980	Gesetz über die Änderung der Vornamen und die Feststellung der Geschlechtszugehörigkeit in besonderen Fällen	Passed		Passed		Signed	Yes Yes
Italy	April 1982	Norme in materia di rettificazione di attribuzione di sesso.	Passed		Passed		Signed	Yes Yes
Japan	July 2003	Act on Special Cases in Handling Gender for People with Gender Identity Disorder	Passed		Passed		Signed	Yes Yes
South Africa	15 March 2004	Alteration of Sex Description and Sex Status Act, 2003	Passed		Passed		Signed	Yes Yes
United Kingdom	July 2004	Gender Recognition Act	155	57	357	48	Signed	Yes Yes
Spain	March 2007	Gender identity law	Passed		Passed		Signed	Yes Yes
Uruguay	November 2009	Gender identity law	20	0	51	2	Signed	Yes Yes
Argentina	May 2012	Gender identity law	55	0	167	17	Signed	Yes Yes
India	January 2014	The Transgender Persons (Protection of Rights) Bill, 2016	Passed		Passed		Signed	Yes Yes
Denmark	September 2014	Gender Recognition law	—N/a		Passed		Signed	Yes Yes
Malta	April 2015	Gender Identity, Gender Expression and Sex Characteristics Act	—N/a		Passed		Signed	Yes Yes
Colombia	June 2015	Gender recognition law (Order 1227)	Passed		Passed		Signed	Yes Yes
(Republic of Ireland) Ireland	July 2015	Gender Recognition Act	Passed		Passed		Signed	Yes Yes
Poland	September 2015	Gender identity law	Passed		252	158	Vetoed	No No
Vietnam	November 2015	Transgender Rights Law	—N/a		Passed		Signed	Yes Yes
Ecuador	February 2016	Civil Registration Act (gender identity recognition on legal documents)	—N/a		82	1	Signed	Yes Yes
Bolivia	May 2016	Gender identity law	Passed		Passed		Signed	Yes Yes
Norway	June 2016	Gender identity law	—N/a		79	13	Signed	Yes Yes
France	November 2016	Gender identity law (abolishing sterilization)	Passed		Passed		Signed	Yes Yes
Canada	June 2017	An Act to amend the Canadian Human Rights Act and the Criminal Code (Bill C-16)	Passed		Passed		Signed	Yes Yes
Belgium	July 2017	Gender identity law (abolishing sterilization)	—N/a		Passed		Signed	Yes Yes
Greece	December 2017	Gender identity law (abolishing sterilization)	—N/a		171	114	Signed	Yes Yes
Pakistan	May 2018	Transgender Persons (Protection of Rights) Bill	Passed		Passed		Signed	Yes Yes
Portugal	July 2018	Gender identity law (expansion: self-determination)	—N/a		109	106	Signed	Yes Yes
Luxembourg	September 2018	Gender identity law (abolishing sterilization)	—N/a		57	3	Signed	Yes Yes
Uruguay	October 2018	Integral gender identity law (expansion: self-determination)	Passed		Passed		Signed	Yes Yes
Chile	November 2018	Gender identity law	26	14	95	46	Signed	Yes Yes
Iceland	December 2019	Gender autonomy law	—N/a		45	0	Signed	Yes Yes
Spain	February 2023	Gender identity law (expansion: self-determination)	—N/a		Passed		Signed	Yes Yes
Scotland	December 2022	Gender Recognition Reform (Scotland) Bill	—N/a		86	39	Blocked	No No
Germany	April 2024	Gender identity law (expansion: self-determination)	—N/a		374	251	Signed	Yes Yes
Sweden	April 2024	Gender identity law (expansion)	—N/a		234	94	Signed	Yes Yes
Australia	October 2024	Change of sex for all 8 jurisdictions within Australia, without any surgery and sterilization	Passed		Passed		Signed	Yes Yes
Thailand	Unknown	Gender identity law	—N/a		Pending			
Brazil	Unknown	Gender identity law	—N/a		Pending			
Costa Rica	Unknown	Gender identity recognition and equality before the law	—N/a		Pending			
El Salvador	Unknown	Gender identity law	—N/a		Pending			
Peru	Unknown	Gender identity law	—N/a		Pending			

== Legislative efforts against the recognition of gender identity ==
=== National level ===
Country	Date	Gender identity/expression legislation	Upper house		Lower house		Head of state	Final outcome
Country	Date	Gender identity/expression legislation	Yes	No	Yes	No	Head of state	Final outcome
Hungary	May 2020	On Amendments to Certain Administrative Laws and the Free Transfer of Property (T/9934), Article 33	—N/a		134	56	Signed	Yes Yes
Slovakia	May 2023	Birth Number Act (Bill No. 301/1995)	—N/a		—N/a		—N/a	—N/a
Russia	July 2023		164	0	386	0	Signed	Yes Yes
United States	January 20, 2025	"Defending Women from Gender Ideology Extremism and Restoring Biological Truth to the Federal Government" (Executive Order 14168)	—N/a		—N/a		Signed	—N/a

== Africa ==
=== Botswana ===
In September 2017, the Botswana High Court ruled that the refusal of the Registrar of National Registration to change a transgender man's gender marker was "unreasonable and violated his constitutional rights to dignity, privacy, freedom of expression, equal protection of the law, freedom from discrimination and freedom from inhumane and degrading treatment". LGBT activists celebrated the ruling, describing it as a great victory. At first, the Botswana government announced it would appeal the ruling, but decided against it in December, supplying the trans man in question with a new identity document that reflects his gender identity. A similar case, where a transgender woman sought to change her gender marker to female, was heard in December 2017. The High Court ruled that the Government must recognise her gender identity. She dedicated her victory to "every single trans diverse person in Botswana".

=== Egypt ===
Transgender people face significant existing societal stigma against the LGBT+ community in Egypt, a conservative Muslim nation. The procedure for gender reassignment is not illegal in Egypt; however, the complication and stigmatisation has put transgender people through mental and physical assault along with torture, as per Human Rights Watch. Reportedly, the statistics of criminal acts committed against the transgender community have not been available because they have had a history of going unreported.

=== Kenya ===
In August 2025, the High Court of Kenya ruled in favor of transgender rights, and ruled that certain rights had been violated against a specific transgender person, "including freedom from torture and cruel, inhuman or degrading treatment, equality and non-discrimination, dignity, freedom and security of the person, and privacy were unconstitutional." The court ordered the national parliament to implement "the enactment of the Transgender Protection Rights Act, or, in the alternative, the amendments of the Intersex Persons Bill 2024".

=== South Africa ===
The Constitution of South Africa forbids discrimination on the basis of sex, gender and sexual orientation (amongst other grounds). The Constitutional Court has indicated that "sexual orientation" includes transsexuality. In 2003, the Parliament of South Africa enacted the Alteration of Sex Description and Sex Status Act, which allows a transgender person who has undergone medical or surgical gender reassignment to apply to the Department of Home Affairs to have the sex description altered on their birth record. Once the birth record is altered they can be issued with a new birth certificate and identity document, and are considered "for all purposes" to be of the new sex.

== Asia ==
=== China ===
According to a survey conducted by Peking University, Chinese trans female students face strong discrimination in many areas of education. Sex segregation is found everywhere in Chinese schools and universities: student enrollment (for some special schools, universities and majors), appearance standards (hairstyles and uniforms included), private spaces (bathrooms, toilets and dormitories included), physical examinations, military trainings, conscription, PE classes, PE exams and physical health tests. Chinese students are required to attend all the activities according to their legal gender marker, otherwise they will be punished. It is also difficult to change the gender information of educational attainments and academic degrees in China, even after sex reassignment surgery, which results in discrimination against well-educated trans women.

=== Hong Kong ===
The Hong Kong Court of Final Appeal ruled that a transsexual woman has the right to marry her boyfriend in the case of W v Registrar of Marriages. The ruling was made on 13 May 2013. On 16 September 2013, Eliana Rubashkyn, a transgender woman claimed that she was discriminated and sexually abused by the customs officers, including being subjected to invasive body searches and denied usage of a female toilet, although Hong Kong officers denied the allegations. After being released, she applied for and was granted refugee status by the United Nations High Commissioner for Refugees (UNHCR), rendering her effectively stateless awaiting acceptance to a third country. In February 2023, the Court of Final Appeal ruled that the government's requirement of full sex reassignment surgery in order to update gender identity on ID cards was unconstitutional and unacceptably burdensome. As of May 2023, the ruling has yet to be implemented.

=== India ===
In April 2014, the Supreme Court of India declared transgender to be a "third gender" in Indian law. The transgender community in India (made up of Hijras and others) has a long history in India and in Hindu mythology. (Note: Justice KS Radhakrishnan noted in his decision that, "Seldom, our society realizes or cares to realize the trauma, agony and pain which the members of Transgender community undergo, nor appreciates the innate feelings of the members of the Transgender community, especially of those whose mind and body disown their biological sex". "Non-recognition of the identity of Hijras/transgender persons denies them equal protection of law, thereby leaving them extremely vulnerable to harassment, violence and sexual assault in public spaces, at home and in jail, also by the police. Sexual assault, including molestation, rape, forced anal and oral sex, gang rape and stripping is being committed with impunity and there are reliable statistics and materials to support such activities. Further, non-recognition of identity of Hijras /transgender persons results in them facing extreme discrimination in all spheres of society, especially in the field of employment, education, healthcare etc." "Hijras/transgender persons face huge discrimination in access to public spaces like restaurants, cinemas, shops, malls etc. Further, access to public toilets is also a serious problem they face quite often. Since, there are no separate toilet facilities for Hijras/transgender persons, they have to use male toilets where they are prone to sexual assault and harassment. Discrimination on the ground of sexual orientation or gender identity, therefore, impairs equality before law and equal protection of law and violates Article 14 of the Constitution of India.) The Transgender Persons (Protection of Rights) Act, 2019, was passed by Parliament in November 2019, and came into effect on 11 January 2020. It protects transgender individuals against discrimination in education, employment and healthcare. It recognizes the gender identity of the individual, and there are provisions in the law for a certificate to be issued with their new gender identity. There have been reservations among some in the transgender community, both regarding the difficulty of obtaining a certificate, and because of lack of awareness and lack of sensitivity to the issue among local public officials. LGBTQ protests against the bill have occurred, with claims that the bill hurts the transgender community instead of helping it. Protesters noted the provision for certification, but criticized the fact that this would require people to register with the government in order to be recognized as transgender. They also criticized the inequality inherent in the vast differences in punishment for the same crime, such as sexual abuse, committed against violating a transgender or cisgender individual.

=== Iran ===
Beginning in the mid-1980s, transgender individuals were officially recognized by the government and allowed to undergo sex reassignment surgery. Officially the leader of Iran's Islamic Revolution, Ayatollah Ruhollah Khomeini, issued a fatwa declaring sex reassignment surgery permissible for "diagnosed transsexuals". The government provides up to half the cost for those needing financial assistance, and a sex change is recognised on the birth certificate. Despite this, Iran's transgender people face discrimination in society. Founded in 2007 by Maryam Khatoon Molkara the Iranian Society to Support Individuals with Gender Identity Disorder (انجمن حمایت از بیماران مبتلا به اختلالات هویت جنسی ایران) is Iran's main transsexual organization. Additionally, the Iranian government's response to homosexuality is to pressure lesbian and gay individuals, who are not in fact transsexual, towards sex reassignment surgery. Eshaghian's documentary, Be Like Others, chronicles a number of stories of Iranian gay men who feel transitioning is the only way to avoid further persecution, jail, or execution. Maryam Khatoon Molkara—who convinced Khomeini to issue the fatwa on transsexuality—confirmed that some people who undergo operations are gay rather than transsexual.

=== Japan ===
On 10 July 2003, the National Diet of Japan unanimously approved a new law that enables transsexual people to amend their legal sex. It is called 性同一性障害者の性別の取扱いの特例に関する法律 (Act on Special Cases in Handling Gender for People with Gender Identity Disorder) The law, effective on 16 July 2004, however, has controversial conditions which demand the applicants be both unmarried and childless. On 28 July 2004, Naha Family Court in Okinawa Prefecture returned a verdict to a transsexual woman in her 20s, allowing the sex on her family registry record or koseki to be amended from male to female. It is generally believed to be the first court approval under the new law. Since 2018, sex reassignment surgeries are paid for by the Japanese government, which are covered by the Japanese national health insurance as long as patients are not receiving hormone treatment and do not have any other pre-existing conditions. However applicants are required to be at least 20 years old, single, sterile, have no children under 20 (the age of majority in Japan), as well as to undergo a psychiatric evaluation to receive a diagnosis of "Gender Identity Disorder", also known as gender dysphoria in western countries. Once completed the patient has to only pay 30% of the surgery costs.

=== Malaysia ===
There is no legislation expressly allowing transsexuals to legally change their gender in Malaysia. The relevant legislations are the Births and Deaths Registration Act 1957 and National Registration Act 1959. Therefore, judges currently exercise their discretion in interpreting the law and defining the gender. There are conflicting decisions on this matter. There is a case in 2003 where the court allowed a transsexual to change her gender indicated in the identity card, and granted a declaration that she is a female. However, in 2005, in another case, the court refused to amend the gender of a transsexual in the identity card and birth certificate. Both cases applied the United Kingdom case of Corbett v Corbett in defining legal gender.

=== Pakistan ===
In Pakistan, some members of the LGBT community have started undergoing acts of sex reassignment surgery to change their sex. There are situations where such cases have caused media attention. A 2008 ruling at Pakistan's Lahore High Court gave permission to Naureen, 28, to have a sex change operation, although the decision was applicable only towards individuals who were diagnosed with gender dysphoria.

In 2009, the Pakistan Supreme Court made a ruling in favor of the transgender community. The landmark ruling stated that as citizens they were entitled to the equal benefit and protection of the law and called upon the Pakistani government to take steps to protect transgender people from discrimination and harassment. Pakistan's chief justice, Iftikhar Chaudhry, was the architect of major extension of rights to Pakistan's transgender community during his term. There are also anti-discrimination laws in the provision of goods and services for transgender or transsexual individuals (known as Khuwaja Sira, formerly hijra, or Third Gender) in Pakistani.

In 2018, the Pakistani government passed the Transgender Person (Protection of Rights) Act, which officially established the legal right of transgender people in Pakistan to identify themselves as such and instituted anti-discrimination laws. These include recognition of transgender identity in legal documents such as passports, identity card, and drivers licences, along with prohibiting discrimination in employment, schools, workplaces, public transit, healthcare, etc. The bill also included the right for inheritance in accordance to their chosen gender. Furthermore, the bill obligates the Pakistani government to build protection centers and safe houses for the specific purpose of being used by the transgender community in Pakistan.

=== Jordan ===
The Court of Cassation, the highest court in Jordan allowed a transsexual woman to change her legal name and sex to female in 2014 after she brought forth medical reports from Australia. The head of the Jordanian Department of civil Status and Passports stated that two to three cases of change of sex reach the department annually, all based on Medical Reports and Court orders.

=== Lebanon ===
In January 2016, the Court of Appeals of Beirut confirmed the right of a transgender man to change his official papers, granting him access to necessary treatment and privacy. Transgender people are required to undergo sex reassignment surgery in order to change their legal gender.

=== Philippines ===
The Supreme Court of the Philippines Justice Leonardo Quisumbing on 12 September 2008, allowed Jeff Cagandahan, 27, to change his birth certificate, gender and name:

We respect respondent's congenital condition and his mature decision to be a male. Life is already difficult for the ordinary person. We cannot but respect how respondent deals with his unordinary state and thus help make his life easier, considering the unique circumstances in this case. In the absence of a law on the matter, the court will not dictate on respondent concerning a matter so innately private as one's sexuality and lifestyle preferences, much less on whether or not to undergo medical treatment to reverse the male tendency due to rare medical condition, congenital adrenal hyperplasia. In the absence of evidence that respondent is an 'incompetent,' and in the absence of evidence to show that classifying respondent as a male will harm other members of society ... the court affirms as valid and justified the respondent's position and his personal judgment of being a male.

Court records showed that at age six, he had small ovaries; at 13, his ovarian structure was minimized, he had no breasts and did not menstruate. The psychiatrist testified that "he has both male and female sex organs, but was genetically female, and that since his body secreted male hormones, his female organs did not develop normally." The Philippines National Institutes of Health said "people with congenital adrenal hyperplasia lack an enzyme needed by the adrenal gland to make the hormones cortisol and aldosterone.

This ruling only applied to cases involving congenital adrenal hyperplasia and other intersex situations. The Philippine Supreme Court has also ruled that Filipino citizens do not have the right to legally change their sex on official documents (driver's license, passport, birth certificate, Social Security records, etc.) if they are transsexual and have undergone sexual reassignment surgery. In 2007, the Court overruled a lower court decision and found that another individual could not legally change name and sex from male to female, as it would have "serious and wide-ranging legal and public policy consequences," citing the institution of marriage in particular.

=== South Korea ===
In South Korea, it is possible for transgender individuals to change their legal gender, although it depends on the decision of the judge for each case. Since the 1990s, however, it has been approved in most of the cases. The legal system in Korea does not prevent marriage once a person has changed their legal gender. In 2006, the Supreme Court of Korea ruled that transsexuals have the right to alter their legal papers to reflect their reassigned sex. A trans woman can be registered, not only as female, but also as being "born as a woman". While same-sex marriage is not approved by South Korean law, a transsexual woman obtains the marital status of 'female' automatically when she marries to a man, even if she has previously been designated as "male". In 2013, a court ruled that transgender people can change their legal sex without undergoing genital surgery.

=== Taiwan ===
Transgender people in Taiwan need to undergo genital surgery (removal of primary sex organs) in order to register gender change on both the identity card and the birth certificate. The surgery requires approval of two psychiatrists, and the procedure is not covered by the National Health Insurance. The government conducted public consultations on the elimination of surgery requirements back in 2015, but no concrete changes have been made since then.

In 2018, the government unveiled the new chip-embedded identity card, scheduled to be issued in late 2020. Gender will not be explicitly displayed on the physical card, although the second digit of national identification number reveals gender information anyway ("1" for male; "2" for female). With the inception of new identity card, a third gender option (using digit "7" as the second digit of national identification number) will be available to transgender persons alike. However, it raises concerns that the practice could stigmatize transgender persons, instead of respecting their gender identity. Details of the third-gender option policy are yet to be released. After same-sex marriage law became effective on 24 May 2019, transgender persons could marry a person of the same registered gender.

== Europe ==
A majority of countries in Europe give transgender people the right to at least change their first name, most of which also provide a way of changing birth certificates. Several European countries recognize the right of transgender people to marry in accordance with their post-operative sex. Croatia, Czech Republic, Denmark, Finland, France, Germany, Ireland, Italy, the Netherlands, Norway, Poland, Portugal, Romania, Sweden, Spain, and the United Kingdom all recognize this right. The Convention on the recognition of decisions regarding a sex change provides regulations for mutual recognition of sex change decisions and has been signed by five European countries and ratified by Spain and the Netherlands.

=== Finland ===
Before 2023, people wishing to change their legal gender in Finland had to be sterilized or be found infertile. A recommendation from the UN Human Rights Council to eliminate the sterilization requirement was rejected by the Finnish government in 2017. In 2023, Finland changed its gender identity law in 2023 so that it no longer requires sterilization and is instead based on self-identification.

=== France ===
In France, the change of the first name can be done by registry office or tribunal. The change of sex can be done by tribunal. In both cases there is no need for psychiatric reports or sex reassignment surgery.

=== Germany ===
In 1908, Imperial Germany (with the help of sexologist Magnus Hirschfeld and the WhK) issued a very limited number of 'transvestite passes' – transvestite at this time referring to crossdressers as well as transgender and gender non-conforming people – which enabled individuals to dress in clothes which were seen as discordant with their sex. This ended in 1933. Since 1980, Germany has a law that regulates the change of first names and legal gender. It is called Gesetz über die Änderung der Vornamen und die Feststellung der Geschlechtszugehörigkeit in besonderen Fällen (de:Transsexuellengesetz – TSG) (Law about the change of first name and determination of gender identity in special cases (Transsexual law – TSG)). Requirements that applicants for a change in gender were infertile post-surgery declared unconstitutional by a supreme court ruling in 2011. In April 2024, the German parliament has passed a self-identification law making it easier for individuals within Germany to legally change gender on documents. It went into legal effect on November 1, 2024.

=== Greece ===
On 10 October 2017, the Greek Parliament passed, by a comfortable majority, the Legal Gender Recognition Bill which grants the transgender people in Greece the right to change their legal gender freely by abolishing any conditions and requirements, such as undergoing any medical interventions, sex reassignment surgeries or sterilisation procedures to have their gender legally recognized on their IDs. The bill grants this right to anyone aged 17 and older. Although, individuals aged between 15 and 17 will have access to the legal gender recognition process, but under certain conditions, such as obtaining a certificate from a medical council. The bill was opposed by the Holy Synod of the Orthodox Church, the Communist Party of Greece, Golden Dawn and New Democracy. The Legal Gender Recognition Bill followed a 20 July 2016 decision of the County Court of Athens, which ruled that a person who wants to change their legal gender on the Registry Office files is no longer obliged to already have undergone a sex reassignment surgery. This decision was applied by the Court on a case-by-case basis.

=== Republic of Ireland ===
In Ireland, it was not possible for a transsexual person to alter their birth certificate until 2015. The High Court took a case by Lydia Foy in 2002 that was turned down, as a birth certificate was deemed to be a historical document. On 15 July 2015 Ireland passed the Gender Recognition Act, which allows legal gender changes without the requirement of medical intervention or assessment by the state. Such change is possible through self-determination for any person aged 18 or over resident in Ireland and registered on Irish registers of birth or adoption. Persons aged 16 to 18 years must secure a court order to exempt them from the normal requirement to be at least 18. At the time, Ireland was one of four legal jurisdictions in the world where people may legally change gender through self-determination.

=== Malta ===
Malta passed the Gender Identity, Gender Expression, and Sex Characteristics Act in 2015. This bill states that all citizens of Malta have the right to

1. The recognition of their gender identity;
2. The free development of their person according to their gender identity;
3. Be treated according to their gender identity and, particularly, to be identified in that way in the documents providing their identity therein; and
4. Bodily integrity and physical autonomy.

This act protects the gender identity of a person at all times. It also states that "person shall not be required to provide proof of a surgical procedure for total or partial genital reassignment, hormonal therapies or any other psychiatric, psychological or medical treatment to make use of the right to gender identity." The act allows parents to postpone listing gender on a child's birth certificate and prohibits "non-medically necessary treatments on the sex characteristics of a person."

=== Nordic countries ===
The Nordic model approach to transgender rights emphasizes the human rights of transgender people and is based on legal equality and self-identification, which has been adopted in countries such as Denmark, Greenland, Norway and Iceland. In 2014, the Danish Parliament voted 59–52 to remove the requirement of a mental disorder diagnosis and surgery with irreversible sterilization for transgender people who wish to change their legal gender. A similar act was adopted in Greenland in 2016. In Norway the Gender Recognition Act, that introduced self-identification, was introduced by the Conservative-led government of Erna Solberg and adopted in 2016. The act received widespread support from most political parties, the LGBTIQ+ rights movement and the feminist movement, including the Norwegian Association for Women's Rights. Transgender people are also protected against discrimination and hate speech under discrimination and criminal law. Iceland adopted the Gender Autonomy Act that introduced self-identification and a third legal gender option in 2019, which received widespread support, including from the Icelandic Women's Rights Association.

The women's rights movement in the Nordic countries strongly supports transgender rights. In 2021 the Icelandic Women's Rights Association in cooperation with the International Alliance of Women organized a forum on how the women's movement could counter "anti-trans voices." Sweden has had a gender identity law since 1972, widely regarded as the first in the world. Since 2013, neither sterilization nor other treatment is required for trans people who need to change their legal sex, but a diagnosis is required. In April 2024, Sweden passed laws coming into effect on 1 July 2025. The minimum age for changing one's legal gender is reduced to 16, and a diagnosis of gender dysphoria is no longer required. Surgical procedures will no longer require the approval of the National Board of Health and Welfare. Finland changed its gender identity law in 2023 so that it no longer requires sterilization and is instead based on self-identification.

=== Poland ===
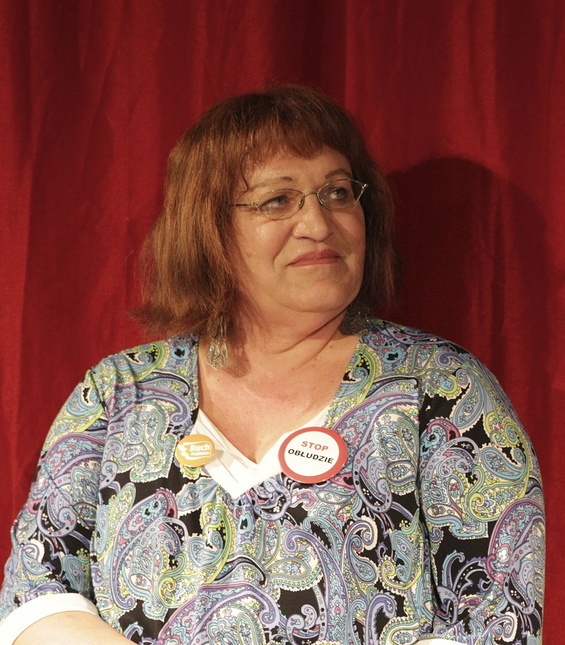
Anna Grodzka, the first transgender MP in Europe

The first milestone sentence in the case of gender shifting was given by Warsaw's Voivode Court in 1964. The court reasoned that it be possible, in face of civil procedure and acting on civil registry records, to change one's legal gender after their genital reassignment surgery had been conducted. In 1983, the Supreme Court ruled that in some cases, when the attributes of the individual's preferred gender were predominant, it is possible to change one's legal gender even before genital reassignment surgery.

In 2011, Anna Grodzka, the first transgender MP in the history of Europe who underwent a genital reassignment operation was appointed. In the Polish Parliamentary Election 2011 she gained 19,337 votes (45,079 voted for her party in the constituency) in the City of Kraków and came sixth in her electoral district (928,914 people, voter turnout 55.75%). Grodzka was reportedly the only transgender person with ministerial responsibilities in the world since 10 November 2011 (as of 2015).

=== Portugal ===
The law allows adults aged 18 or older to change their legal gender without any requirements. Persons aged 16 and 17 are able to change gender with parental consent and a psychological opinion, confirming that their decision has been taken freely and without any outside pressure. The law also prohibits both direct and indirect discrimination based on gender identity, gender expression and sex characteristics, and bans non-consensual sex assignment treatment and/or surgical intervention on intersex children.

=== Romania ===
In Romania it is legal for transgender people to change their first name to reflect their gender identity based on personal choice. Since 1996, it has been possible for someone who has gone through genital reassignment surgery to change their legal gender in order to reflect their post-operative sex. Transgender people then have the right to marry in accordance with their post-operative sex.

=== United Kingdom ===
The Sex Discrimination Act 1975 made it illegal to discriminate on the ground of anatomical sex in employment, education, and the provision of housing, goods, facilities and services. The Equality Act 2006 introduced the Gender Equality Duty in Scotland, which required public bodies to take seriously the threat of harassment or discrimination against transsexual people in various situations. In 2008 the Sex Discrimination (Amendment of Legislation) Regulations extended existing regulation to outlaw discrimination when providing goods or services to transsexual people. The Equality Act 2010 added "gender reassignment" as a "protected characteristic".

The Gender Recognition Act 2004 effectively granted full legal recognition for binary transgender people. The gender recognition process under the Act does not require applicants to be post-operative but there must be significant medical explanation as to why an individual has not undergone sex reassignment surgery. They need to demonstrate that they have suffered gender dysphoria, have lived as their affirmed gender (i.e. the gender to which they are transitioning) for two years, and intend to continue doing so until death. It was significantly undermined by the Supreme Court's ruling in For Women Scotland Ltd v The Scottish Ministers, which held that 'woman' under the Equality Act 2010 refers to biological sex, meaning a GRC no longer confers recognition of a trans person’s legal sex "for all purposes" as originally intended.

Legal scholars have argued that as a GRC no longer confers recognition of sex the UK may again be in breach of its Article 8 obligations as described by Goodwin v United Kingdom, and European Court of Human Rights cases are currently pending on the grounds of articles 8, 6, 12 and 14 of the European Convention on Human Rights

== North America ==
=== Canada ===
Jurisdiction over legal classification of sex in Canada is assigned to the provinces and territories. This includes legal change of gender classification. On 19 June 2017 Bill C-16, after having passed the legislative process in the House of Commons of Canada and the Senate of Canada, became law upon receiving Royal Assent which put it into immediate force. The law updated the Canadian Human Rights Act and the Criminal Code to include "gender identity and gender expression" as protected grounds from discrimination, hate publications and advocating genocide. The bill also added "gender identity and expression" to the list of aggravating factors in sentencing, where the accused commits a criminal offence against an individual because of those personal characteristics. Similar transgender laws also exist in all the provinces and territories. Bill C-4 reached Royal assent on 8 December 2021, criminalizing the practice of conversion therapy throughout Canada.

=== Mexico ===
Jurisdiction over legal classification of sex in Mexico is assigned to the states and Mexico City. This includes legal change of gender classification. On 13 March 2004, amendments to the Mexico City Civil Code that allow transgender people to change their gender and name on their birth certificates, took effect. In September 2008, the PRD-controlled Mexico City Legislative Assembly approved a law, in a 37–17 vote, making gender changes easier for transgender people. On 13 November 2014, the Legislative Assembly of Mexico City unanimously (46–0) approved a gender identity law. The law makes it easier for transgender people to change their legal gender. Under the new law, they simply have to notify the Civil Registry that they wish to change the gender information on their birth certificates. Sex reassignment surgery, psychological therapies or any other type of diagnosis are no longer required. The law took effect in early 2015. On 13 July 2017, the Michoacán Congress approved (22–1) a gender identity law. Nayarit approved (23–1) a similar law on 20 July 2017.

=== United States ===
On 15 June 2020, the Supreme Court of the United States (SCOTUS) ruled in Bostock v. Clayton County that for the purposes of Title VII of the Civil Rights Act of 1964, discrimination on the basis of transgender status is also discrimination because of sex. Regardless of the legal sex classification determined by a state or territory, the federal government may make its own determination of sex classification for federally issued documents. For instance, the U.S. Department of State requires a medical certification of "appropriate clinical treatment for transition to the updated gender (male or female)" to amend the gender designation on a U.S. passport, but sex reassignment surgery is not a requirement to obtain a U.S. passport in the updated gender. This leaves transgender Americans subject to inconsistent regulations when seeking surgery and hormone treatment.

A total of 616 'anti-trans bills' were considered in 2025, of which 74 became law. These bills aim to re-define sex, restrict access to gender affirming care, to education, to sports, to bathrooms, and to marriage and military positions. One such bill is Florida's "Parental Rights in Education Act" law ("Don't Say Gay" law), with a stated purpose to "prohibit classroom discussion about sexual orientation or gender identity", introduced by Joe Harding and Dennis Baxley, both members of the Florida House of Representatives, that would allow a teacher or school counsellor to be charged with a felony if they support a social transition. Supporting or encouraging a social transition can be as simple as using preferred names or pronouns. The teacher or school counsellor would also need to register as a sex offender if found guilty. In January 2025, Executive Order 14168, titled "Defending Women from Gender Ideology Extremism and Restoring Biological Truth to the Federal Government", was issued by President Donald Trump. The order directs federal agencies to recognize only two sexes—male and female—defined by biological characteristics, removes references to "gender identity" from federal policy, and instructs agencies to align documents and forms accordingly.

== South America ==
South America has some of the most progressive legislation in the world regarding transgender rights. Bolivia and Ecuador are among the few countries worldwide that offer constitutional protection against discrimination based on gender identity. Transgender persons are allowed to change their name and gender on legal documents in a majority of countries. Argentina, Brazil, Bolivia, Chile, Colombia, Ecuador and Uruguay allow individuals to change their name and gender without undergoing medical treatment, sterilization or judicial permission. In Peru, a judicial order is required.

=== Argentina ===
In 2012 the Argentine Congress passed the Ley de Género (Gender Law), which allows individuals over 18 to change the gender marker in their DNI (national ID) on the basis of a written declaration only. Argentina thus became the first country to adopt a gender recognition policy based entirely on individual autonomy, without any requirement for third party diagnosis, surgeries or obstacles of any type.

=== Bolivia ===
The Gender Identity law allows individuals over 18 to legally change their name, gender and photography on legal documents. No surgeries or judicial order are required. The law took effect on 1 August 2016.

=== Brazil ===
In 1971, Roberto Farina performed the first male-to-female gender-affirming surgery in Brazil. Changing legal gender assignment in Brazil is legal according to the Superior Court of Justice of Brazil, as stated in a decision rendered on 17 October 2009. In 2008, Brazil's public health system started providing free sexual reassignment operations in compliance with a court order. Federal prosecutors had argued that sexual reassignment surgery was covered under a constitutional clause guaranteeing medical care as a basic right. Patients must be at least 18 years old and diagnosed as transsexuals with no other personality disorders, and must undergo psychological evaluation with a multidisciplinary team for at least two years, begins with 16 years old. The national average is of 100 surgeries per year, according to the Ministry of Health of Brazil. In December 2020, a bill was introduced that defines biological sex at birth as the only factor in determining gender.

=== Chile ===
Chile bans all discrimination and hate crimes based on gender identity and gender expression. The Gender Identity Law, in effect since 2019, recognizes the right to self-perceived gender identity, allowing people over 14 years to change their name and gender on all official documents without prohibitive requirements. Since 1974, the change of gender had been possible in the country through a judicial process.

=== Colombia ===
Since 2015, a Colombian person may change their legal gender and name manifesting their solemn will before a notary, no surgeries or judicial order required.

=== Ecuador ===
Since 2016, Ecuadorians are allowed to change their birth name and gender identity (instead of the sex assigned at birth) on legal documents and national ID cards. The person who wants to change the word "sex" for "gender" in the identity card shall present two witnesses to accredit the self-determination of the applicant.

=== Peru ===
In Peru transgender persons can change their legal gender and name after complying with certain requirements that may become psychological and psychiatric evaluations, a medical intervention or sex reassignment surgery. A judicial permission is required. In November 2016, the Constitutional Court of Peru determined that transsexuality is not a pathology and recognized the right to gender identity. However, favorable judicial decisions on gender change have been appealed.

=== Uruguay ===
Since 2019, transgender people can self-identify their gender and update their legal name, without approval from a judge after the approval of the Comprehensive Law for Trans Persons. The new law creates scholarships for trans people to access education, a monthly pension for transgender people born before 1975 and also requires government services to employ a minimum of 1% of the transgender population. It also now acknowledges the self-identification of non-binary people. In October 2009, lawmakers passed the Gender identity law allowing transgender people over the age of 18 to change their name and legal gender on all official documents. Surgery, diagnosis or hormone therapy were not a requirement but a judicial permission was required.

== Oceania ==
=== Australia ===
Birth certificates are regulated by the states and territories, whereas marriage and passports are matters for federal law. All Australian jurisdictions now recognise the affirmed sex of an individual, with varying requirements. In the landmark case New South Wales Registrar of Births, Deaths and Marriages v Norrie [2014] the High Court of Australia held that the Births Deaths and Marriages Registration Act 1995 (NSW) did not require a person having undergone genital reassignment surgery to identify as either a man or a woman. The ruling permits a gender registration of "non-specific".

Passports are issued in the preferred gender, without requiring a change to birth certificates or citizenship certificates. A letter is needed from a medical practitioner which certifies that the person has had or is receiving appropriate treatment. Australia was the only country in the world to require the involvement and approval of the judiciary (Family Court of Australia) with respect to allowing transgender children access to hormone replacement therapy. This ended in late 2017, when the Family Court issued a landmark ruling establishing that, in cases where there is no dispute between a child, their parents, and their treating doctors, hormone treatment can be prescribed without court permission.

=== Fiji ===
The Constitution of Fiji which was promulgated in September 2013 includes a provision banning discrimination based on sexual orientation and gender identity or expression.

=== Guam ===
Gender changes are legal in Guam. In order for transgender people to change their legal gender in Guam, they must provide the Office of Vital Statistics a sworn statement from a physician that they have undergone sex reassignment surgery. The Office will subsequently amend the birth certificate of the requester.

=== New Zealand ===
Currently, the Human Rights Act 1993 does not explicitly prohibit discrimination on the basis of gender. Whilst it is believed that gender identity is protected under the laws preventing discrimination on the basis of either sex or sexual orientation, it is not known how this applies to those who have not had, or will not have, gender reassignment surgery.

=== Northern Mariana Islands ===
Transgender persons in the Northern Mariana Islands may change their legal gender following sex reassignment surgery and a name change. The Vital Statistics Act of 2006, which took effect in March 2007, states: "Upon receipt of a certified copy of an order of the CNMI Superior Court indicating the sex of an individual born in the CNMI has been changed by surgical procedure and whether such individual's name has been changed, the certificate of birth of such individual shall be amended as prescribed by regulation."

=== Samoa ===
In Samoa, crimes motivated by sexual orientation and/or gender identity are criminalized under Section 7(1)(h) of the Sentencing Act 2016.

== Table and world map of legal status ==
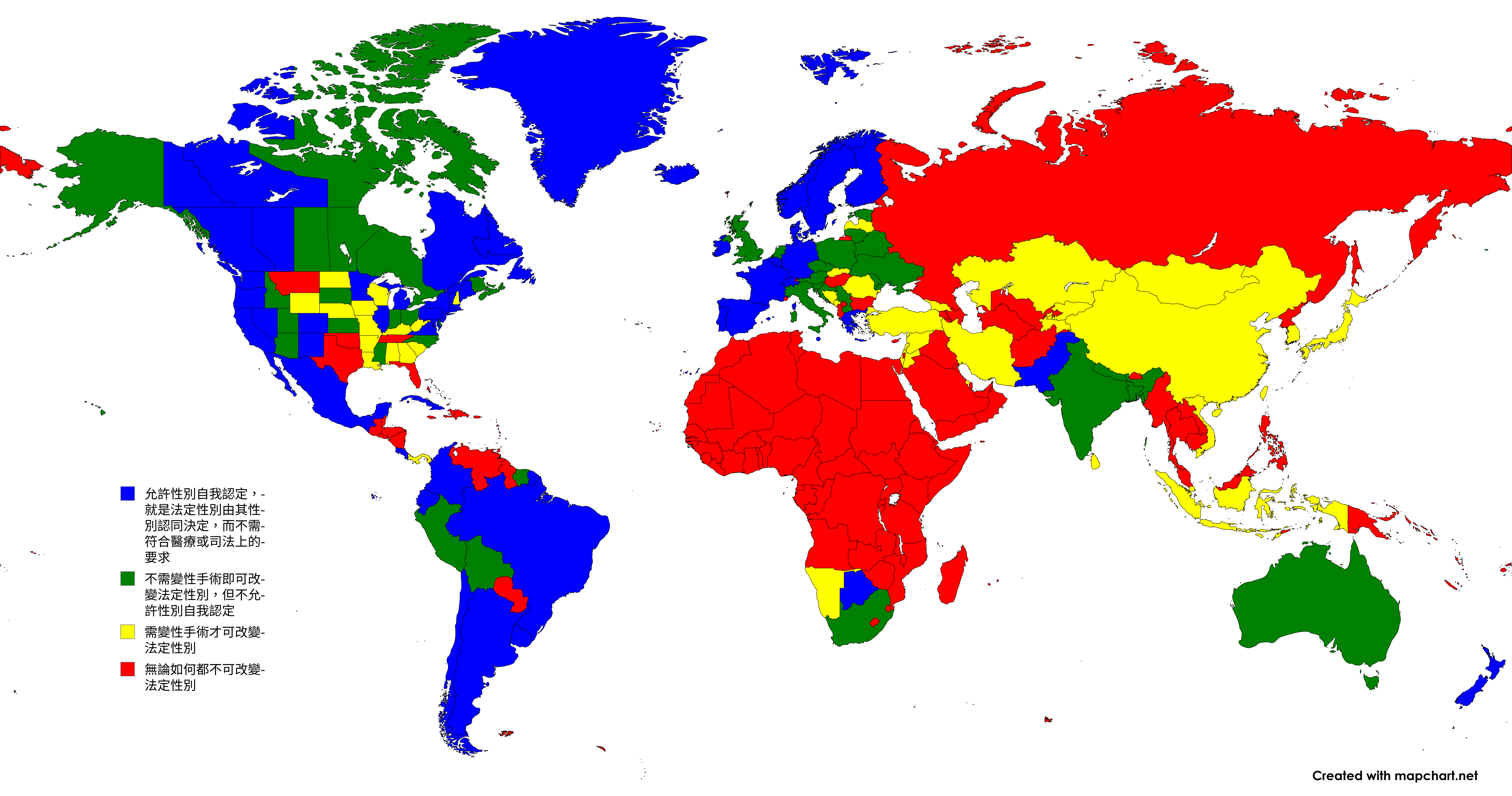
Laws concerning gender identity-expression by country or territory in 2025: Gender self-identification Legal identity change, surgery not required, but not gender self-identification Legal identity change, surgery required No legal identity change

Some of the data are provided by Spartacus Gay Travel Index and highlights the legal status of gender identity change and expression.

Legend
Legal
Permitted, with complex legality or practice
Varies by subdivision
Prohibited
Unknown or unclear

Legal status of transgender people
Country	Status
Abkhazia	Unknown or unclear
Afghanistan	Prohibited
Albania	Prohibited
Algeria	Prohibited
American Samoa	Legal
Andorra	Legal
Angola	Permitted
Antigua and Barbuda	Unknown or unclear
Argentina	Legal
Armenia	Prohibited
Aruba	Unknown or unclear
Australia	Legal in all 8 jurisdictions
Austria	Legal
Azerbaijan	Prohibited
Bahamas	Prohibited
Bahrain	Permitted, with Sterilization
Bangladesh	Permitted, with complex legality or practice
Barbados	Prohibited
Belarus	Prohibited (Defacto)
Belgium	Legal
Belize	Prohibited
Benin	Prohibited
Bermuda	Prohibited
Bhutan	Prohibited
Bolivia	Legal
Bonaire	Legal
Bosnia and Herzegovina	Permitted, with complex legality or practice
Botswana	Permitted, with complex legality or practice
Brazil	Legal
British Indian Ocean Territory	Unknown or unclear
British Virgin Islands	Prohibited
Brunei	Prohibited
Bulgaria	Prohibited
Burkina Faso	Prohibited
Burundi	Prohibited
Cabo Verde	Unknown or unclear
Cambodia	Prohibited
Cameroon	Prohibited
Canada	Legal
Cayman Islands	Prohibited
Central African Republic	Prohibited
Chad	Prohibited
Chile	Legal
China	Permitted, with Sterilization
Colombia	Legal
Comoros	Prohibited
Congo	Prohibited
Cook Islands	Prohibited
Costa Rica	Legal
Croatia	Legal
Cuba	Legal
Curaçao	Unknown or unclear
Cyprus	Prohibited
Czech Republic	Permitted, with complex legality or practice
Democratic Republic of the Congo	Prohibited
Denmark	Legal
Djibouti	Prohibited
Dominica	Prohibited
Dominican Republic	Prohibited
East Timor	Prohibited
Ecuador	Legal
Egypt	Prohibited
El Salvador	Unknown or unclear
Equatorial Guinea	Prohibited
Eritrea	Prohibited
Estonia	Legal
Eswatini	Prohibited
Ethiopia	Prohibited
Falkland Islands	Legal
Faroe Islands	Prohibited
Fiji	Prohibited
Finland	Legal
France	Legal
French Guiana	Legal
French Polynesia	Legal
French Southern and Antarctic Lands	Legal
Gabon	Unknown or unclear
Gambia	Prohibited
Georgia	Prohibited
Germany	Legal
Gibraltar	Prohibited
Ghana	Prohibited
Greece	Legal
Greenland	Legal
Grenada	Prohibited
Guadeloupe	Legal
Guam	Permitted, with complex legality or practice
Guatemala	Prohibited
Guinea	Prohibited
Guinea-Bissau	Prohibited
Guyana	Prohibited
Haiti	Prohibited
Hong Kong	Permitted, with complex legality or practice
Honduras	Prohibited
Hungary	Prohibited
Iceland	Legal
India	Legal
Indonesia	Permitted, with complex legality or practice
Iran	Permitted, with Sterilization
Iraq	Prohibited
Ireland	Legal
Isle of Man	Legal
Israel	Permitted, with complex legality or practice
Italy	Legal
Ivory Coast	Prohibited
Jamaica	Prohibited
Japan	Permitted, with complex legality or practice
Jordan	Prohibited (Defacto)
Kazakhstan	Permitted, with Sterilization
Kenya	Prohibited
Kiribati	Prohibited
Kosovo	Prohibited
Kuwait	Prohibited
Kyrgyzstan	Prohibited
Laos	Prohibited
Latvia	Permitted, with Sterilization
Lebanon	Permitted, with Sterilization
Lesotho	Permitted
Liberia	Prohibited
Libya	Prohibited
Liechtenstein	Unknown or unclear
Lithuania	Legal
Luxembourg	Legal
Macau	Unknown or unclear
Madagascar	Prohibited
Malawi	Prohibited
Malaysia	Prohibited
Maldives	Prohibited
Mali	Prohibited
Malta	Legal
Marshall Islands	Prohibited
Martinique	Legal
Mauritania	Prohibited
Mauritius	Unknown or unclear
Mayotte	Legal
Mexico	Varies by subdivision
Micronesia	Prohibited
Moldova	Legal
Monaco	Prohibited
Mongolia	Permitted, with complex legality or practice
Montenegro	Permitted, with Sterilization
Morocco	Prohibited
Mozambique	Unknown or unclear
Myanmar	Prohibited
Namibia	Permitted, with complex legality or practice
Nauru	Prohibited
Nepal	Legal
Netherlands	Legal
New Caledonia	Legal
New Zealand	Legal
Nicaragua	Prohibited
Niger	Prohibited
Nigeria	Prohibited
Northern Cyprus	Permitted, with complex legality or practice
Northern Mariana Islands	Legal
North Korea	Prohibited
North Macedonia	Legal
Norway	Legal
Oman	Prohibited
Pakistan	Legal
Palau	Prohibited
Palestine	Prohibited
Papua New Guinea	Prohibited
Panama	Permitted, with complex legality or practice
Paraguay	Prohibited
Peru	Legal
Philippines	Prohibited
Poland	Permitted, with complex legality or practice
Portugal	Legal
Puerto Rico	Legal
Qatar	Prohibited
Réunion	Legal
Romania	Permitted, with Sterilization
Russia	Prohibited
Rwanda	Prohibited
Saba	Legal
Saint Barthélemy	Legal
Saint Kitts and Nevis	Prohibited
Saint Lucia	Prohibited
Saint Martin	Legal
Saint Vincent and the Grenadines	Prohibited
Samoa	Prohibited
San Marino	Prohibited
Sao Tome and Principe	Unknown or unclear
Saudi Arabia	Prohibited
Senegal	Prohibited
Seychelles	Unknown or unclear
Sierra Leone	Prohibited
Singapore	Permitted, with complex legality or practice
Sint Eustatius	Legal
Serbia	Legal
Slovenia	Legal
Slovakia	Prohibited (Defacto)
Solomon Islands	Prohibited
Somalia	Prohibited
Somaliland	Prohibited
South Africa	Legal
South Korea	Permitted, with complex legality or practice
South Ossetia	Unknown or unclear
South Sudan	Prohibited
Spain	Legal
Sri Lanka	Permitted, with complex legality or practice
Sudan	Prohibited
Suriname	Legal
Sweden	Legal
Switzerland	Legal
Syria	Prohibited
Taiwan	Permitted, with complex legality or practice
Tajikistan	Prohibited (Defacto)
Tanzania	Prohibited
Thailand	Prohibited
Togo	Prohibited
Tonga	Prohibited
Transnistria	Unknown or unclear
Trinidad and Tobago	Prohibited
Tunisia	Prohibited
Turkey	Permitted, with complex legality or practice
Turkmenistan	Prohibited
Tuvalu	Prohibited
Uganda	Prohibited
Ukraine	Legal
United Arab Emirates	Prohibited
United Kingdom	Legal
United States	Varies by subdivision; prohibited federally
United States Virgin Islands	Legal
Uruguay	Legal
Uzbekistan	Prohibited
Vanuatu	Prohibited
Vatican City	Prohibited
Venezuela	Prohibited
Vietnam	Permitted, with complex legality or practice
Wallis and Futuna	Legal
Western Sahara	Prohibited
Yemen	Prohibited
Zambia	Prohibited
Zimbabwe	Prohibited

== See also ==
- Criminalization of transgender people
- Gender diversity
- Gender self-identification
- GenderPAC — defunct US advocacy group working to end discrimination and violence caused by gender stereotypes by changing public attitudes, educating elected officials, and expanding human rights
- Human rights
- Diane Rodríguez – set a legal precedent (2009) right to change legal names female to male and vice versa for people transgender and intersex by the approval of the 2008 Constitution of Ecuador
- Legal recognition of non-binary gender
- LGBT people in prison
- LGBT rights by country or territory — including gender identity/expression
- List of transgender-related topics
- List of transgender-rights organizations
- Right to personal identity
- Transgender asylum seekers
- Transgender inequality
- Transgender rights movement
- Transitioning (transgender)
- LGBTQ refugees and asylum seekers

== Works cited ==
- Chow, Melinda. (2005). "Smith v. City of Salem: Transgendered Jurisprudence and an Expanding Meaning of Sex Discrimination under Title VII". Harvard Journal of Law & Gender. Vol. 28. Winter. 207.
- Currah, Paisley; Juang, Richard M.; Minter, Shannon Price, eds. (2006). Transgender Rights. Minneapolis: University of Minnesota Press. Archived from the original on 16 July 2011.
- Sellers, Mitchell D. (2011). "Discrimination and the Transgender Population: A Description of Local Government Policies that Protect Gender Identity or Expression". Paper 360. Applied Research Projects, Texas State University-San Marcos. Archived from the original on 11 March 2012.
- Hoston, William (14 June 2018). Toxic Silence. Peter Lang Publishing. ISBN 9781433155994.
