= Tourmakeady College =

Secondary school in County Mayo, Ireland

Tourmakeady College Irish: Coláiste Mhuire Tuar Mhic Éadaigh

Information
- Established: 1905; 120 years ago
- Language: Irish

Tourmakeady College (Irish: Coláiste Mhuire Tuar Mhic Éadaigh) is an Irish-speaking voluntary secondary school in Tourmakeady, County Mayo, Ireland. The school has approximately 200 students.

The school was at the centre of the Gaelic literary revival. The Coláiste Chonnacht was founded in 1905 as a summer school by Conradh na Gaeilge. The principal was Micheál Breathnach, with Máire Ní Tuathail as his assistant. The school became known as Cliabhran Conradh na Gaeilge—the "cradle of the Gaelic League". Among the people who visited the school were Douglas Hyde (later to become the first President of Ireland), Patrick Pearse, Éamon de Valera, Kuno Meyer (the renowned German Gaelic scholar), Padraig Ó Domhnallain, and other Irish writers visited the school frequently. De Valera was later to marry Sinead Flanagan, who had been a teacher at the school.

Coláiste Chonnacht continued as a summer school until the 1960s; it was then taken over by the Sisters of Mercy, who ran a successful boarding school for girls. The sisters left in 1990 owing to a drop in the number of vocations, and the school was handed over to a local committee.

== Alumni ==
- Mary Laffoy (b. 1945) - judge
- Máire Geoghegan-Quinn (b. 1950) - former Fianna Fáil politician; European Commissioner for Research, Innovation and Science (2010-2014)
