= Mary Laffoy =

Irish judge (born 1945)

President of the Law Reform Commission
- In office 20 October 2018 – 22 July 2022
- Nominated by: Government of Ireland
- Preceded by: John Quirke
- Succeeded by: Frank Clarke

Chair of the Citizens' Assembly
- In office 14 July 2016 – 21 June 2018
- Taoiseach: Enda Kenny; Leo Varadkar
- Preceded by: New office
- Succeeded by: Catherine Day

Judge of the Supreme Court
- In office 27 July 2013 – 16 June 2017
- Nominated by: Government of Ireland
- Appointed by: Michael D. Higgins

Judge of the High Court
- In office 23 June 1995 – 27 July 2016
- Nominated by: Government of Ireland
- Appointed by: Mary Robinson

Personal details
- Born: 17 June 1945 (age 81) North Circular Road, Dublin, Ireland
- Education: University College Dublin; King's Inns

Mary Eleanor Laffoy, SC (born 17 June 1945) is a retired Irish judge who served as President of the Law Reform Commission from 2018 to 2022, a Judge of the Supreme Court from 2013 to 2017, and a Judge of the High Court from 1995 to 2013. She also chaired the Citizens' Assembly between 2016 and 2018.

== Early life ==
Laffoy was born on North Circular Road, Dublin, moving to Manorhamilton and Swinford, before returning to Dublin to live in Donabate following the death of her father. She attended Tourmakeady College in Toormakeady.

Initially, after leaving school, she tried primary school teaching at Carysfort College and joined the civil service. She was subsequently educated at University College Dublin and King's Inns. She received the John Brooks Scholarship at the Inns for achieving the highest marks. She received a BA degree from UCD in 1968 and a BCL degree in 1971.

== Legal career ==
She was called to the Bar in 1971 and to the Inner Bar in 1987. She devilled for Brian McCracken. She became a Senior Counsel on the same day as future Supreme Court colleagues Susan Denham and Liam McKechnie and at the time was only one of four women seniors.

Her expertise at the Bar was in property law. She appeared in the Cityview Press case which clarified the law on the nondelegation doctrine in Ireland. In 1983, she was appointed by the Supreme Court to argue against the constitutionality of the Electoral (Amendment) Bill 1983 following a reference made by President Patrick Hillery under Article 26 of the Constitution of Ireland. She appeared in another Article 26 reference made by Mary Robinson regarding the Matrimonial Home Bill 1993. For both references, the Supreme Court found for her side.

In 1986, she appeared on The Late Late Show in a simulated court case to argue for a vote against the Fifteenth Amendment of the Constitution of Ireland.

== Judicial career ==
=== High Court ===
She was appointed as a judge of the High Court in 1995. She primarily presided over cases involving chancery law.

She presided over the Commission to Inquire into Child Abuse from 1999 to 2003, an inquiry into child abuse. Her decision to resign as chair before the commission completed its report was controversial. In her letter of resignation from the commission of 2 September 2003, Laffoy outlined her belief that the actions of the Government and the Department of Education had frustrated her efforts and had slowed the commission's work. She felt that: "...the cumulative effect of those factors effectively negated the guarantee of independence conferred on the Commission and militated against it being able to perform its statutory functions." The commission was chaired from 2003 to 2009 by Judge Sean Ryan.

She presided over the High Court hearing in A v Governor of Arbour Hill Prison, ordering the release of a prisoner convicted of statutory rape due to an earlier finding that the offence he was convicted of was contrary to the Constitution of Ireland. Her decision was overturned on appeal to the Supreme Court. In 2012, she dismissed an action taken by Thomas Pringle regarding the legality of the European Stability Mechanism. The European Court of Justice, after reference from the Supreme Court, also rejected his claim.

During her time at the High Court, ten per cent of reported judgments were written by Laffoy.

=== Supreme Court ===
Laffoy was appointed to the Supreme Court of Ireland in July 2013. She retired from the Supreme Court on 16 June 2017. A portrait of her was unveiled in the King's Inns in March 2020.

== Additional appointments ==
=== Citizens' Assembly ===
In July 2016, she was appointed by Taoiseach Enda Kenny to chair the Citizens' Assembly, which she chaired until June 2018.

=== Law Reform Commission ===
She became the president of the Law Reform Commission in 2018.
