= Transgender Equality Network of Ireland =

Irish nonprofit organisation

- Location: Dublin, Ireland
- CEO: Sam Blanckensee
- Website: TENI.ie

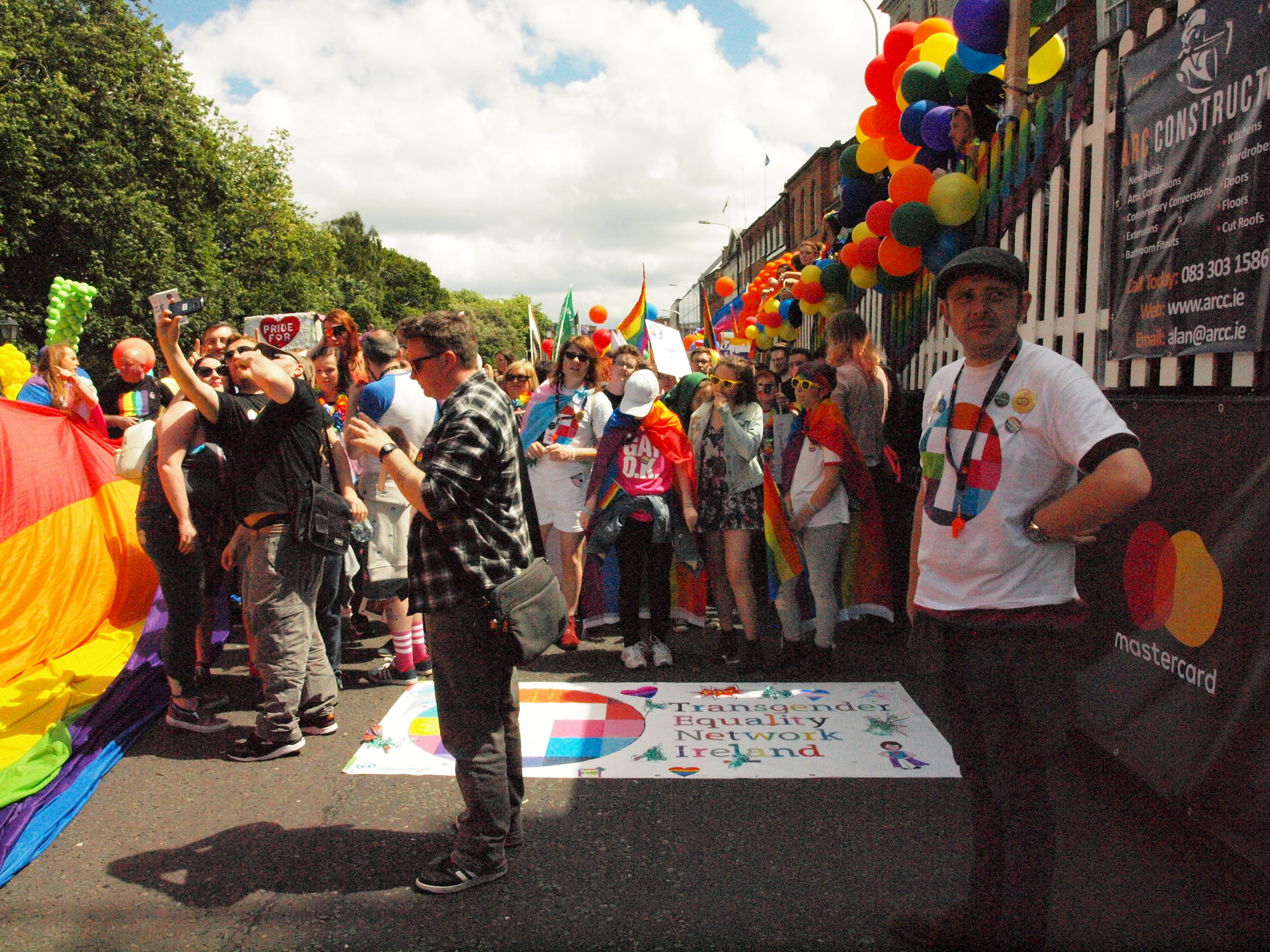
Transgender Equality Network of Ireland at the Dublin Pride Parade 2017

Transgender Equality Network of Ireland (TENI) is an Irish nonprofit organisation founded in 2006, which seeks to improve conditions and rights for transgender people and their families in Ireland.

== STAD: Stop Transphobia and Discrimination ==
In 2013 TENI launched the STAD: Stop Transphobia and Discrimination campaign. The campaign sought to raise awareness of transphobic hate crimes by collecting and providing data to stakeholders such as the Garda Síochána. The first report was launched on 18 June 2014 at the University of Limerick. The report offered six recommendations:

- Transphobic incidents should be logged on the PULSE (Police Using Leading Systems Effectively) system
- Additional training should be provided for police officers
- Conduct further research
- Improve the relationship between the trans community and the police
- Advocate for legislation to protect trans people
- Educate the public about transphobia

== National Transgender Healthcare Conference ==
On 3 December 2015, in partnership with the HSE, TENI co-hosted the first National Transgender Healthcare Conference in Carlow. The conference, which was attended by 380 healthcare professionals, sought to highlight issues that transgender people face accessing health services in Ireland. This conference led to the publication of the HSE's Health Report towards meeting the health care needs of lesbian, gay, bisexual and transgender people.

== Strategy for Education and Skills 2016–18 ==
TENI made a submission on the Strategy for Education and Skills 2016–18 to improve the conditions and advance the rights of trans people and their families.

== Publications ==
- Speaking from the Margins: Trans Mental Health and Wellbeing in Ireland
- STAD: Stop Transphobia and Discrimination Report

== See also ==
- Transgender rights in Ireland
