= Airey v Ireland =

1979 European Court of Human Rights case

Airey v. Ireland (application No. 6289/73) was a case decided by the European Court of Human Rights in 1979.

== Facts ==
Mrs. Airey wished to obtain a decree of judicial separation from her husband (divorce was illegal in Ireland); at that time legal aid was not available in Ireland for any civil matters, including seeking a judicial separation.

== Judgment ==
The Court held that:

- there has been a breach of Article 6 para. 1 (fair trial) of the European Convention on Human Rights, by 5 votes to 2;
- there has been a breach of Article 8 (private and family life), by 4 votes to 3;
- it was not necessary also to examine the case under Article 14 (non-discrimination) taken in conjunction with Article 6 para. 1, by 4 votes to 3;
- it was not necessary also to examine the case under Article 13 (effective remedy), by 4 votes to 3.

Judges Thór Vilhjálmsson, O'Donoghue and Evrigenis each filed a dissent.

== Impact ==
In the case, it was established that the right of effective access to the courts may entail legal assistance. Airey case has been applied in a number of cases on civil legal aid.
