= A v Governor of Arbour Hill Prison =

Irish Supreme Court case

A v Governor of Arbour Hill Prison [2006] 4 IR 88
- Coat of arms of Ireland
- Court: Supreme Court of Ireland
- Citation: [2006] IESC 45

Case history
- Appealed from: Dublin Circuit Court
- Appealed to: Supreme Court

Court membership
- Judge sitting: Murray C.J. Denham J. McGuinness J. Hardiman J. Geoghegan J.

Case opinions
- Decision by: Geoghegan J.

Keywords
- Crime and Sentencing Offences Against The Person Evidence

In A v Governor of Arbour Hill Prison [2006] IESC 45; [2006] 4 IR 88; [2006] 2 ILRM 481, the Supreme Court of Ireland ruled that a finding that criminal legislation is unconstitutional need not render existing convictions void.

== Background ==
The applicant was convicted before the Dublin Circuit Court on 15 June 2004 of unlawful carnal knowledge of a girl under the age of consent contrary to section 1(1) of the Criminal Law Act 1935 (the 1935 Act). On 24 November 2004 he was sentenced to 3 years imprisonment. Subsequently, in CC v Ireland, the Supreme Court found that that section was inconsistent with the constitutional rights of the accused since it failed to afford the accused the opportunity to defend a statutory rape charge by pleading that he made a reasonable mistake as to the age of the girl. Accordingly, the section was declared unconstitutional pursuant to Article 50 of the Constitution. A statute inconsistent with the Constitution is ordinarily of no legal effect. Hence, Ms Justice Laffoy in the High Court held that as the purported conviction of A related to something that was not an offence in criminal law, both conviction and sentence were a legal nullity, and, consequently, ordered his release from prison. The State appealed.

== Holding of the Supreme Court ==
Before the Supreme Court, A argued that the retrospective effect of a finding of unconstitutionality is essentially unqualified. Murray CJ rejected this argument. Just because a statute is declared unconstitutional, long after cases have been decided on the basis of that statute, does not mean that such decisions can now be seen as invalid. Agreeing with the A's arguments would disturb an ordered constitutional system. In A's case a final decision had been made. He was found guilty after a plea and subsequently incarcerated. He is not appealing the decision, rather he is initiating a collateral attack on the final decision when he could have raised the constitutionality of the subsection concerned during his initial proceedings. Conviction of unlawful carnal knowledge of an underage girl has always been condemned in the State and has been an offence since the time the legislation was formed. Moreover, A knew the girl was under the age of 17 years at the time the offence was committed. Counsel on behalf of A also did not find any previous case involving collateral attack of judicial decisions that has already been finalized because there is no such case law.

The law can be changed when a particular case raises an issue which shows that the Constitution needs to be modified. In such instances, what was normally held as the law can be extended by referring to the general principles. So, retrospectivity is allowed. Where a statute is declared unconstitutional, any person previously convicted on the basis of an invalid statute can seek remedy. However, they can only do so by following the ordinary rules of law such as if the statute of limitations has passed then they cannot initiate a proceeding. Pending cases are also included in this but a final judicial decision is excluded from retrospective effect. Public policy reasons require that there be a limit on retroactive effect of judicial decisions. So, even if there exceptions it is necessary to uphold the principles of justice and a functional judicial system. Also when interpreting an article as constitutional or unconstitutional, a court must consider that article in light of the whole constitution. The Court thought that A's claims had no persuasive elements. This is because his argument essentially means that if any statute prior to 1937 if declared as unconstitutional in the next decade or more, then every decision under that statute will have no legal effect. So, decisions spanning over a long period of time will suddenly become void. This would not be what the common law system envisaged when creating a limitation on retrospective effect. Also without such limitation, allowing every previous decision to be set aside would be a great injustice to all the victims and against the fundamentals of society. Previous case law which addressed retrospective effect has also upheld the principle that there needs to be limitations on this effect. The Constitution requires that there needs to be a distinction between a declaration of invalidity and retrospective effects of such declarations. A declaration of invalidity should not be applied to all existing previous decisions as this would be disadvantageous to an ordered society, victims of those cases and a coherent legal system. The general principle has always been that a declaration of unconstitutionality will not affect judicial decisions which has already reached a final stage of decision. There can be exceptional situations where an accused argues that such a decision have denied him justice and thus should be deemed as void. However, A's case do not possess any exceptional circumstances hence the general rule should apply.

The Supreme Court overturned the High Court judgement on the basis that A cannot now question the legal validity of his detention when his case already reached a final stage of decision in terms of conviction and punishment. Moreover, he was claiming that his detention was unlawful. He was not looking to re-open his case or appeal against the previously decided judgement. Hence, retrospective effect cannot be applicable in his circumstances as the limitation to such an effect is that it is not germane to finalized judicial decisions.

== Subsequent developments ==
In Ireland, this case reinforced the jus tertii rule:

A person who seeks to invalidate a statutory provision must do so by reference to the effect of the provision on his own rights.

== See also ==
- Supreme Court of Ireland
- Unlawful carnal knowledge
- High Court (Ireland)
- Jus tertii
