= Free Legal Advice Centres =

Irish non-profit organisation which provides free legal advice

- Founded: April 1969 by David Byrne, Denis McCullough, Vivian Lavan and Ian Candy in the Republic of Ireland
- Type: Non-profit; NGO
- Location: 13 Lower Dorset St., Dublin, Ireland
- Fields: Human Rights Campaigning/Provision of basic free legal services.
- Website: http://www.flac.ie

Free Legal Advice Centres (FLAC; Irish: Ionaid Chomhairle Dlí Saor in Aisce) is a non-profit human rights organisation that provide pro bono publico assistance via a network of legal advice clinics throughout the Republic of Ireland. They have been involved in a number of notable law cases including Airey v. Ireland.

== History ==
FLAC was created in April 1969, a group of law students who used their legal knowledge to provide advice and information to those who could not afford the fees involved. They promoted access to legal redress for all, regardless of economic status.

It was through this work that they hoped to advance their ultimate objective: influence the government into instituting a comprehensive plan providing civil legal aid to those in need. FLAC's operations expanded rapidly. By 1972, 2,437 cases had been handled. By 1974, this had risen to over 8000.

In some ways, these efforts distracted from the greater campaign for state-funded civil legal aid. Yet, ultimately it was a threat by FLAC to withdraw these services which forced the government to take action on civil legal aid.

Responding to FLAC's campaign, the government formed the Pringle Committee in 1974 to address the issue of civil legal aid in Ireland. Meanwhile, FLAC continued its own efforts, achieving one of its early ambitions in 1975 by opening the first community law centre in Ireland. In 1977, the Pringle Committee published its Report calling for the provision of state-funded legal aid centres and for individuals to be educated about their rights, echoing the demands made by FLAC.

However, the government remained slow to implement the Pringle Report. FLAC would emerge as central to two events which finally pressured the government to take action. The first was the landmark ECHR case, Airey v. Ireland which challenged the prohibitive costs of a legal separation as breaching an individual's access to justice. Supported by FLAC and represented by Mary Robinson, Josie Airey won her case against the state and assurances of an adequate scheme of legal aid were secured from the government.

FLAC has inspired individuals and groups in other parts of the world to replicate its initiatives. One example is of Advocate Obaid Naseem Chaudhry of Islamabad, who is also providing free legal advice services.
