= Gender Recognition Act 2015 =

Irish legislation

On 15 July 2015, the Irish Oireachtas passed the Gender Recognition Act 2015 (Irish: An tAcht um Inscne a Aithint, 2015), which permits adult Irish citizens to apply for a Gender Recognition Certificate to update their legal name and gender. The application can only be used to change gender between male and female, as non-binary identities are not legally recognized.

== Application process ==
The GRC certificate can then be used to change personal details on any professional, personal, or legal documentation. The law does not require any medical intervention by the applicant, nor an assessment by medical professionals, and is free of charge.

Applicants must first fill out an GRC1 form, and have it witnessed by either a peace commissioner, notary public, solicitor, or commissioner of oaths. After which the form must be posted to the Department of Social Protection, along with a copy of valid photo ID, original birth certificate or adoption certificate or original Foreign Birth Register Certificate. For applicants born outside of the Republic of Ireland proof of residency for twelve months before the application date is also required.

== Gender recognition for minors ==
Applicants under the age of 16 are currently not allowed. For those aged 16 to 17 years they must secure a court order to exempt them from the normal age requirement. This is often done through consensual parental support, but can also be accomplished with a letter of support from a GP or endocrinologist.

A private members bill was introduced in 2017 by David Norris and Grace O'Sullivan to amend the act, providing a right to self determination of a person's gender once they have reached the age of 16, introduce a legal right to gender recognition for persons under the age of 16, and to ensure consideration of the status of non-binary persons on reviews of the legislation.While this bill was successful in passing second stage in the Seanad, it lapsed with the dissolution of the Dáil in January 2025.

In July 2018 a proposed review from the Department of Social Protection advised for an easier pathway for applicants ages 16 to 17, although this has not passed into law yet.

== Non-binary gender recognition ==
Non-binary or third genders are not currently recognised by the provisions of the act, as the only possible gender fields are male/female in the current GRC 1 form. In addition, the only explicit honorific titles included are Mr., Mrs. and Ms., with a write-in box for "Other" titles. The 2018 review of the act recommended adding a system of gender recognition for non-binary people, but as of 2026 this has yet to be implemented. On 24 September 2026, Ruth Coppinger, a TD for the Solidarity Party introduced a private member's bill to amend the act to include provisions for a non-binary gender/intersex marker, alongside amending the Interpretation Act 2005 and the Civil Registration Act 2004 to allow for an "X marker" on civil documents, and amending the Equal Status Act 2000 and the Employment Equality Act 1998 to outlaw discrimination on the basis of "sexual characteristics". The bill was supported by organisations such as BelongTo, Intersex Ireland, Mammies for Trans Rights, Transgender Equality Network Ireland and Trans Healthcare Action. The bill was debated at second stage on 21 October 2026, and was supported by the Labour Party, Sinn Féin, and the Social Democrats, and opposed by Aontú, Independent Ireland and the Government, ultimately being defeated by 87 votes to 63.

== See also ==
- Gender Recognition Act 2004
- Gender Recognition Act (Norway)
