= John MacMenamin =

Irish judge (born 1952)

Judge of the Supreme Court
- In office 15 March 2012 – 24 November 2022
- Nominated by: Government of Ireland
- Appointed by: Michael D. Higgins

Judge of the High Court
- In office 15 November 2004 – 15 March 2012
- Nominated by: Government of Ireland
- Appointed by: Mary McAleese

Personal details
- Born: 25 November 1952 (age 73) Ranelagh, Dublin, Ireland
- Spouse: Lia O'Hegarty (m. 2004)
- Children: 1
- Education: University College Dublin; King's Inns

John Eoin MacMenamin (born 25 November 1952) is a retired Irish judge who served as a Judge of the Supreme Court from 2012 to 2022 and a Judge of the High Court from 2004 to 2012.

== Early career ==
MacMenamin was born in Dublin in 1952 and educated at Terenure College. He studied history at University College Dublin, where he was involved with the UCD L&H. He subsequently attended the King's Inns. He was called to the Bar in 1975, and became a Senior Counsel in 1991. He was a council member of the Free Legal Advice Centres while studying. While working at a FLAC centre in Tallaght, he spoke to the mother of a young defendant who had not had representation and initiated contact with other lawyers on the matter which eventually led to the case State (Healy) v Donoghue. The case established a constitutional right to legal aid in criminal cases.

At the bar, he had a mixed practice, with an emphasis on administrative law, defamation and commercial law. He represented the Sunday Independent in a libel case taken by Proinsias De Rossa and again in the first blasphemy case taken since the country's foundation in Corway v. Independent Newspapers. He was a legal adviser to the Medical Council of Ireland and was involved in a long-running case involving neurosurgery at Beaumont Hospital, Dublin.

He appeared for several clients at the Mahon Tribunal and for the Department of Education at the Laffoy Commission.

He was Chairman of the Bar Council from 1997 to 1999. During his tenure, there was an increase in the fees paid to barristers taking part in the criminal legal aid scheme, following a dispute between the government and the barristers. He was a member of the board of the VHI between 1995 and 1997.

== Judicial career ==
=== High Court ===
He was appointed a High Court judge in 2004 on the same day as future Supreme Court colleagues Frank Clarke and Elizabeth Dunne. He presided primarily over judicial review and constitutional cases. He was a member of the Special Criminal Court from 2009. Towards the end of his time at the High Court he was the Judge-in-Charge of the Minors' List, dealing with sensitive cases involving children.

=== Supreme Court ===
He was appointed to the Supreme Court in March 2012.

In January 2020, he marched in Warsaw, Poland, with other senior judges from across Europe arising out of issues surrounding the 2015 Polish Constitutional Court crisis. He carried letters of solidarity from the Association of Judges of Ireland.

MacMenamin retired in November 2022.

== Personal life ==
He married Lia O’Hegarty, a lawyer, in 2004, in Rome. They have one daughter.

He was formerly involved with Fine Gael, working as speechwriter for Taoiseach Garret FitzGerald and a lead adviser to Michael Noonan during the 2002 general election.
