= Liam McKechnie =

Irish judge (born 1951)

Judge of the Supreme Court
- In office 5 July 2010 – 19 April 2021
- Nominated by: Government of Ireland
- Appointed by: Mary McAleese

Judge of the High Court
- In office 19 October 2000 – 5 July 2010
- Nominated by: Government of Ireland
- Appointed by: Mary McAleese

Personal details
- Born: William Martin McKechie; 3 April 1951 (age 75) Kinsale, County Cork, Ireland
- Education: University College Cork; University College Dublin; King's Inns

William Martin McKechnie, SC (born 3 April 1951) is an Irish judge who served as a Judge of the Supreme Court from 2010 and 2021 and a Judge of the High Court from 2000 to 2010.

== Early life ==
He was born in 1951 and educated at Presentation Brothers College, Cork. He graduated from University College Cork in 1971 with a BCL degree and the King's Inns in 1972. He holds a master's degree in European law from University College Dublin, which he obtained while a High court judge.

== Legal career ==
He was called to the Bar in 1972. He became a Senior Counsel in October 1987, on the same day as future Supreme Court colleagues Susan Denham and Mary Laffoy. His practice focused on commercial law, medical negligence, chancery law and the law related to local authorities. He also appeared in cases involving judicial review.

He was elected chairman of the Bar Council in 1999 (succeeding John MacMenamin), and was elected again in 2000. He was the vice chairman in 1993 and 1997. He served a term as the chair of the professional practices committee of the Bar Council, and was a member of the Commission on the Private Rented Residential Sector, the Valuation Tribunal and the Courts Service Board. He is a Bencher of the King's Inns.

== Judicial career ==
=== High Court ===
McKechnie was appointed a High Court judge in October 2000. He presided over competition matters in the High Court from 2004 to 2010. He heard the case of Competition Authority v. Beef Industry Development Society at first instance in 2006. He also sat as a judge in the Special Criminal Court and the Court of Criminal Appeal.

In the High Court, McKechnie made Ireland's first declaration of incompatibility under the European Convention on Human Rights Act 2003 in Foy v An t-Ard Chláraitheoir. He heard the Miss D case in 2007, where he determined that a seventeen-year-old girl in care could travel to the United Kingdom to obtain an abortion. An editorial in the Irish Examiner said the decision was "compassionate, sympathetic and landmark". Also in 2007, he decided in the Mr. G case that an unmarried father had a right to withhold or give consent before their child is removed from the country. The Supreme Court upheld the decision. He heard a challenge to the legality of the Twenty-eighth Amendment of the Constitution of Ireland in 2009.

His decision in Digital Rights Ireland v. Minister for Communications clarified the rules of standing, outlining criteria required for a company to pursue an actio popularis.

In 2010, he was elected President of the Association of European Competition Law Judges Association of European Competition Law Judges, which represents judges from each of the European Union member states.

=== Supreme Court ===
In June 2010, he was nominated to the Supreme Court of Ireland, following the retirement of Hugh Geoghegan. He was appointed by President of Ireland Mary McAleese in July 2010. He was the first graduate of UCC to be appointed to the Supreme Court.

Among his judgments adopted unanimously by the court included cases involving family law, judicial review, tax law, insolvency law, immigration law, European Union law, and extradition.

McKechnie wrote dissents in significant decisions of the court. In 2015, in DPP v. JC he formed the minority with John L. Murray and Adrian Hardiman, declining to depart from previous court decisions regarding the exclusionary rule in Ireland. He disagreed with six other judges of the Supreme Court in 2017 in DPP v Doyle by holding that people in custody had a right of access to a solicitor during questioning. In Persona Digital Telephony Ltd v. Minister for Public Enterprise, Ireland he wrote the sole dissent from the majority regarding the position of champerty and maintenance in Irish law. The approach of McKechnie in Gorry v. Minister for Justice and Equality, where he held that there was a constitutional right for spouses to cohabit, was not adopted by his colleagues.

He was a member of the Administration of Civil Justice Review Report chaired by Peter Kelly which made recommendations on modernising and lowering the cost of civil litigation in the Irish courts.

He retired upon reaching the mandatory retirement age of 70 in April 2021.

== Personal life ==
He is married to Goretti.
