= Privacy in Australian law =

Privacy in Australian law is affected and protected in limited ways by common law in Australia and a range of federal, state and territorial laws, as well as administrative arrangements. There is no absolute right to privacy in Australian law and there is no clearly recognised tort of invasion of privacy or similar remedy available to people who feel their privacy has been violated.

Australian courts have historically been reluctant to recognise a standalone cause of action for invasion of privacy, most notably in Australian Broadcasting Corporation v Lenah Game Meats Pty Ltd, where the High Court declined to confirm the existence of such a tort, while leaving open the possibility that it might develop in the future. As a result, individuals seeking redress for privacy intrusions must generally rely on indirect causes of action, such as breach of confidence, defamation, trespass, nuisance, or intentional infliction of harm, none of which are designed primarily to protect privacy interests.

In 2025, Australian privacy law underwent a significant reform with the introduction of a statutory cause of action for serious invasions of privacy added under the Privacy Act 1988(cth). For the first time, individuals in Australia gained a direct legal right to sue another person or organisation for serious invasions of their privacy, without needing to rely solely on indirect causes of action such as breach of confidence or equitable remedies.

== What is privacy? ==
There is no statutory definition of privacy in Australia. The Australian Law Reform Commission (ALRC) was given a reference to review Australian privacy law in 2006. During that review it considered the definition of privacy in 2007 in its Discussion paper 72. In it, the ALRC found there is no "precise definition of universal application" of privacy; instead it conducted the inquiry considering the contextual use of the term "privacy".

In reaching that conclusion, the ALRC began by considering the concept of privacy:

"It has been suggested that privacy can be divided into some separate, but related concepts:

- Information privacy, which involves the establishment of rules governing the collection and handling of personal data such as credit information, and medical and government records. It is also known as "data protection";
- Bodily privacy, which concerns the protection of people’s physical selves against invasive procedures such as genetic tests, drug testing and cavity searches;
- Privacy of communications, which covers the security and privacy of mail, telephones, e-mail and other forms of communication; and
- Territorial privacy, which concerns the setting of limits on intrusion into the domestic and other environments such as the workplace or public space. This includes searches, video surveillance and ID checks.

== Privacy at common law ==
It is unclear if a tort of invasion of privacy exists under Australian law. The ALRC summarised the position in 2007:

In Australia, no jurisdiction has enshrined in legislation a cause of action for invasion of privacy; however, the door to the development of such a cause of action at common law has been left open by the High Court in Australian Broadcasting Corporation v Lenah Game Meats Pty Ltd (Lenah Game Meats). To date, two lower courts have held that such a cause of action is part of the common law of Australia. ...
At common law, the major obstacle to the recognition in Australia of a right to privacy was, before 2001, the 1937 High Court decision in Victoria Park Racing & Recreation Grounds Co Ltd v Taylor (Victoria Park). In a subsequent decision, the High Court in Lenah Game Meats indicated clearly that the decision in Victoria Park 'does not stand in the path of the development of … a cause of action (for invasion of privacy)'. The elements of such a cause of action – and whether the cause of action is to be left to the common law tradition of incremental development or provided for in legislation – remain open questions.

However, in 2008, the Court of Appeal of the Supreme Court of Victoria held "damages should be available for breach of confidence occasioning distress, either as equitable compensation, or under Lord Cairns' Act." This is a reference to the equitable doctrine of breach of confidence, which is different from a tort of invasion of privacy, although it has some applications to situations where one's privacy has been invaded.

In 2013, Attorney-General of Australia Mark Dreyfus QC MP again referred the issue of privacy to the ALRC. Its terms of reference included a detailed legal design of a statutory cause of action for serious invasions of privacy, and to consider the appropriateness of any other legal remedies to redress for serious invasions of privacy. The final report, Serious Invasions of Privacy in the Digital Era (ALRC Report 123), was tabled in September 2014, after there had been a change of government. There has not been a formal response from the Australian government.

== Postal confidentiality ==
Since at least the 19th century, it has been the practice to enclose mail in an envelope to prevent infringement of confidentiality. The unauthorised interception of mail of another is a criminal offence.

== Telecommunications privacy ==
=== Telecommunications (Interception and Access) Act 1979 ===
An Attorney-General discussion paper notes:

"The primary objective of the current legislation governing access to communications is to protect the privacy of users of telecommunications services in Australia by prohibiting covert access to communications except as authorised in the circumstances set out in the Telecommunications (Interception and Access) Act 1979."

=== Telecommunications (Interception and Access) Amendment (Data Retention) Act 2015 ===
On 26 March 2015 both Houses of Parliament passed the Telecommunications (Interception and Access) Amendment (Data Retention) Act 2015, which received royal assent on 13 April 2015.

The Act implements recommendations of the Parliamentary Joint Committee on Intelligence and Security (PJCIS) Report of the Inquiry into Potential Reforms of Australia’s National Security Legislation by amending the Telecommunications (Interception and Access) Act 1979 to:

- require telecommunications service providers to retain for two years telecommunications data (not content) prescribed by regulations;
- provide for a review by the PJCIS of the mandatory data retention scheme no more than three years after the end of its implementation phase;
- limit the range of agencies that are able to access telecommunications data and stored communications;
- provide for record-keeping and reporting the use of, and access to, telecommunications data; and
- require the Commonwealth Ombudsman to inspect and oversight these records for compliance, and Telecommunications Act 1997 to make consequential amendments.

== 2025 Reform ==
The reform was achieved through the Privacy and Other Legislation Amendment Act 2024(cth), which amended the Privacy Act 1988(cth) to include a new statutory tort. While many amendments in the Act took effect upon royal assent in late 2024, the statutory cause of action for serious invasions of privacy commenced on 10 June 2025.

This change implements long‑standing recommendations, including from the Australian Law Reform Commission's 2014 report "Serious Invasions of Privacy in the Digital Era", which proposed creating a dedicated statutory cause of action for privacy invasions. Under the statutory cause of action, an individual may have a cause of action against another person if: The defendant invaded the plaintiff's privacy by intruding upon the plaintiff's seclusion or misusing information that relates to the plaintiff.

- A person in the plaintiff's position would have had a reasonable expectation of privacy in all the circumstances.
- The invasion was intentional or reckless.
- The invasion was serious.
- The public interest in protecting privacy outweighs any countervailing public interest.
- No proof of damage is required for the cause of action to arise.
- Proceedings must generally be commenced within 1 year after the plaintiff became aware of the invasion or within 3 years after it occurred. If the person whose privacy was invaded is under the age of 18, they don't have to start proceedings right away. Instead, they have until their 21st birthday to file a claim.
- A range of defences and exemptions applies, including consent, lawful authority, and exemptions for certain categories of entities such as intelligence and law enforcement bodies.

== Australian privacy laws ==
=== Commonwealth ===
- Privacy Act 1988
- Telecommunications Act 1997
- National Health Act 1953
- Data-matching Program (Assistance and Tax) Act 1990
- Crimes Act 1914
- Anti-Money Laundering and Counter-Terrorism Financing Act 2006
- The Healthcare Identifiers Act 2010
- Personally Controlled Electronic Health Records Act 2012
- Telecommunications (Interception and Access) Amendment (Data Retention) Act 2015

=== New South Wales ===
- Privacy and Personal Information Protection Act 1998
- Health Records and Information Privacy Act 2002
- Freedom of Information Act 1989 (Repealed)
- State Records Act 1998
- Criminal Records Act 1991
- Surveillance Devices Act 2007
- Workplace Surveillance Act 2005
- Telecommunications (Interception and Access) (New South Wales) Act 1987
- Access to Neighbouring Land Act 2000
- Crimes (Forensic Procedures) Act 2000

=== Victoria ===
- Privacy and Data Protection Act 2014
- Health Records Act 2001
- The Charter of Human Rights and Responsibilities Act 2006
- Freedom of Information Act 1982
- Public Records Act 1973
- Surveillance Devices Act 1999
- Telecommunications (Interception) (State Provisions) Act 1988

=== Queensland ===
- Human Rights Act 2019
- Public Interest Disclosure Act 2010
- Information Privacy Act 2009
- Right to Information Act 2009
- Public Records Act 2002
- Police Powers and Responsibilities Act 2000
- Criminal Law (Rehabilitation of Offenders) Act 1986
- Invasion of Privacy Act 1971
- Private Employment Agents (Code of Conduct) Regulation 2005

=== South Australia ===
- Freedom of Information Act 1991
- State Records Act 1997
- Surveillance Devices Act 2016
- Listening and Surveillance Devices Act 1972
- Telecommunications (Interception) Act 1988

=== Western Australia ===
- Freedom of Information Act 1992
- Health Services (Conciliation and Review) Act 1995
- State Records Act 2000
- Spent Convictions Act 1988
- Surveillance Devices Act 1998
- Telecommunications (Interception) Western Australia Act 1996

=== Tasmania ===
- Personal Information Protection Act 2004
- Right to Information Act 2009
- Archives Act 1983
- Annulled Convictions Act 2003
- Listening Devices Act 1991
- Telecommunications (Interception) Tasmania Act 1999

=== Northern Territory ===
- Information Act 2002
- Criminal Records (Spent Convictions) Act 1992
- Surveillance Devices Act 2007
- Telecommunications (Interception) Northern Territory Act 2001

=== Australian Capital Territory ===
- Privacy Act 1988 (Cth)
- Australian Capital Territory Government Service (Consequential Provisions) Act 1994 (Cth)
- Health Records (Privacy and Access) Act 1997
- Human Rights Act 2004
- Freedom of Information Act 1989
- Territory Records Act 2002
- Spent Convictions Act 2000
- Listening Devices Act 1992

== See also ==
- Expectation of privacy
- Privacy law
- Information privacy
- Online Safety Amendment The introduction of identification-based age checks on social media.
- Mass surveillance in Australia
