= AAA & Anor v Minister for Justice & Ors =

Irish Supreme Court case

- Coat of arms of Ireland
- Court: Supreme Court of Ireland
- Full case name: AAA and JAA (an infant suing by his mother and next friend AAA) and EAA (an infant suing by her mother and next friend AAA) and SAA (an infant suing by his mother and next friend AAA) (Nigeria) v The Minister for Justice, Ireland and the Attorney General
- Decided: 16 October 2012
- Citation: [2017] IESC 80

Case history
- Appealed from: High Court of Ireland

Court membership
- Judges sitting: Dunne J., Charleton J., Hogan J.

Case opinions
- Decision by: Charleton J.

Keywords
- Immigration; Asylum; Interlocutory injunction; Appeal; Deportation

AAA & Anor v Minister for Justice & Ors, [2017] IESC 80, was an Irish Supreme Court case which arose from the judgment delivered by Cooke J in the High Court on 17 May 2012, due to the fact that the applicant AAA and her children were deported to Nigeria in 2011. The court held that "as a rule" there is no right to an oral hearing in an application for leave to remain on humanitarian grounds and subsidiary protection where there has already been oral hearings in relation to an application for asylum. This decision clarified the grounds under which a claim for subsidiary protection could be heard.

== Background ==
In 2007, the applicants, a single-mother AAA, who was pregnant, came to The Republic of Ireland with her three infant children JAA, EAA and SAA for the purpose of applying for asylum. The first applicant claimed that she was living in an oil-rich area of Nigeria and that her family experienced difficulty in the area up to 10 March 2007. The story involved rape, the abduction of her husband, including her eldest son, beatings, threats as well as extortion inflicted on her family by some unknown men as a result of her family providing shelter to four unknown expatriates, who came from Europe and Canada to work in the oil industry in the area. She claimed that these violent circumstances led to the disappearance of her husband the father of her children, including her other child.

The Refugee Applications Commissioner refused their allegations in August 2010 when they were seeking asylum as the story was discovered to be incredible when examined by the Refugee Applications Commissioner and the Refugee Appeals Tribunal. She was then advised of her right to apply to the Minister for Justice and Equality in order for her and children to be considered for leave to remain in the State on humanitarian grounds and also under subsidiary protection. However, in June 2011 their applications were rejected by the Minister and this led to all the applicants being repatriated to Nigeria in December 2011.

In May 2012, while still in Nigeria they applied to the High Court through their lawyer asking the court to allow them to commence judicial review proceedings. Cooke J granted them leave to apply for judicial review by declaring that the Minister's deportation order was invalid because he did not personally consider if the non-refoulement obligations of the State would be contravened by the deportation order made against the Applicants. The appeal was heard by a panel of three judges.

The appeal at the Supreme Court was lodged in May 2012 against Cooke J's decision not to grant the applicants leave to judicial review on the broader grounds they applied for prior to establishing the Court of Appeal. In September 2013, the applicants applied for the judicial review and McDermott J turned down their applications.

== Holding of the Supreme Court ==
In the Supreme Court three judges delivered the judgement. In the judgment Charleton J stated that the present circumstances of the defendants were not known. Charleton J wrote the judgment of the Court, while both Dunne J and Hogan J agreed with the decision. Charleton J reviewed case law concerning the limitations of the remedial functions of judicial review, including the recent developments regarding the application in asylum cases. The Justice emphasized that since the case of Meadows v Minister for Justice, the courts had decided to apply a proportionality test in judicial review while assessing the reasonableness of the decision that was under challenge. Most importantly, "where the impugned decision engaged fundamental rights."

Charleton J explained that any decision which affects the rights of the defendants should be proportionate to the objective the Minister for Justice wanted to achieve. While citing the analysis of Hogan J in NM v The Minister for Justice, Equality and Law Reform, particularly where the Court of Appeal decided that the judicial review, post-Meadows, was sufficiently flexible enough to provide a comprehensive review as mandated by Article 39 of the Asylum Procedures Directive (2005/85/EC)

Considering NM v The Minister for Justice, Equality and Law Reform and ISOF v Minister for Justice, Equality and Law Reform, Charleton J was satisfied that judicial review was an effective remedy. Furthermore, the Justice stated that in the absence of any express provision as contained in the Procedures Directive (2005/85/EC) necessitating the Member States to offer a right of appeal different for judicial review, any other conclusion reached would appear at variance with the fundamental principle of the EU law concerning the national procedural autonomy.

Concerning the right of the applicants to be heard, the Supreme Court resolved that in the case of MM v Minister for Justice Equality and Law Reform, the Court decided that for assessing the applications for refugee status as well as for subsidiary protection, applicants have the right to an interview concerning their applications, including the right to call as well as cross-examine witnesses during the interview.

While affirming the decision of Cooke J of the High Court to refuse leave to appeal on the previously noted three grounds, Justice Charleton stressed that there had been careful examination of the case made by the applicants, and stated that the High Court had already made a decision that there was an effective remedy under Article 47 of the Charter of Fundamental Rights of the European Union.

The Supreme Court summarized its ruling as follows:

"1. Judicial review is an effective remedy providing a thorough review of the Minister's decision to refuse subsidiary protection (NM v The Minister for Justice, Equality and Law Reform, Hogan J) 2. 'As a rule' there is no right to an oral hearing in an application for subsidiary protection where there has already been oral hearings in relation to an application for asylum (Case C-277/11, MM v Minister for Justice, Equality and Law Reform, 22 November 2012)"
