= Okunade v Minister for Justice & Others =

Irish Supreme Court case

Okunade v. Minister for Justice & Others
- Coat of arms of Ireland
- Court: Supreme Court of Ireland
- Full case name: Okunade v Minister for Justice Equality and Law Reform & the Attorney General
- Decided: 16 October 2012
- Citation: [2012] IESC 49

Case history
- Appealed from: High Court of Ireland

Court membership
- Judges sitting: Denham C.J., Hardiman, Fennelly, O'Donnell, Clarke

Case opinions
- Test case in which an interlocutory injunction to restrain deportation was granted on grounds of injustice.

Keywords
- Immigration; Asylum; Interlocutory injunction; Appeal; Deportation

Okunade v Minister for Justice & Others [2012] IESC 49 was an Irish Supreme Court case in which the Court ruled that the disruption to family life was sufficient injustice to grant an interlocutory injunction to restrain deportation while the applicants challenged pending deportation orders. The case had become moot by the time that the appeal reached the Supreme Court but proceeded as a test case because the issue of interlocutory injunctions arises in a significant number of Supreme Court cases.

== Background ==
The applicants were Nigerian nationals, a mother and her four-year-old son who was born in Ireland but was not an Irish citizen. The applicants had sought to claim asylum in Ireland and had been refused. They applied for subsidiary protection in the State, a protection for those who do not qualify for refugee status, and for "leave to remain", permission to remain in Ireland for humanitarian reasons. Their applications were refused by the Minister for Justice, Equality and Law Reform and deportation orders were made for the Okunades. The applicants challenged these decisions and applied for an interlocutory injunction to restrain their deportation pending trial. The High Court refused to grant the interlocutory injunction. The case was appealed to the Supreme Court.

== Holding of the Supreme Court ==
The Supreme Court unanimously overturned the decision of the High Court. The Court concluded that the disruption to family life was significant enough to grant the injunction, especially because a young child was involved. The decision's author wrote:

"However, I feel that it is not possible, on the facts of this case, to overlook the fact that one of the applicants is a child of some four years of age who has known no country other than Ireland. It is hardly the fault of that child that the substantial lapse of time involved in this whole process has led to such a situation. Rather that current status is a function of the lack of a coherent system and sufficient resources. As pointed out earlier a significant disruption of family life is a countervailing factor which, provided it be of sufficient weight, can be enough to tip the balance in favor of the granting of a stay or an injunction."

The Court concluded that cases of this nature would need to be decided upon in a manner that carried the lower risk of injustice.

== Subsequent developments ==
The case was a test case to develop case law by raising issues affecting other cases and highlighting the effects of significant delays that are common when dealing with asylum cases.

== See also ==
- Subsidiary protection
- Right of asylum
- Interlocutory injunction
- Indefinite leave to remain
