= List of acts of the Parliament of Victoria from 1988 =

This is a list of acts of the Parliament of Victoria, Australia for the year 1988.

== 1988 ==
Short title, or popular name	Citation	Royal assent
Long title
Land (Goonawarra Golf Course) Act 1988	No. 6 of 1988	19 April 1988
An Act to authorise the sale of the Goonawarra Golf Course, to provide for the legal effect of certain documents and for other purposes.
Land (Transaction Information) Act 1988 (repealed)	No. 8 of 1988	27 April 1988
An Act to amend the Land Tax Act 1958, (Note: Land Tax Act 1958 (No. 6289)) the Valuation of Land Act 1960, (Note: Valuation of Land Act 1960 (No. 6653)) the Geelong Waterworks and Sewerage Act 1958, (Note: Geelong Waterworks and Sewerage Act 1958 (No. 6263)) the Local Government Act 1958, (Note: Local Government Act 1958 (No. 6299)) the Melbourne and Metropolitan Board of Works Act 1958, (Note: Melbourne and Metropolitan Board of Works Act 1958 (No. 6310)) the Mildura Irrigation Trusts and Sunraysia Water Board Act 1958, (Note: Mildura Irrigation and Water Trusts Act 1958 (No. 6316)) the Sewerage Districts Act 1958 (Note: Sewerage Districts Act 1958 (No. 6368)) and the Water Act 1958 (Note: Water Act 1958 (No. 6413)) and for other purposes. (Repealed by Statute Law Revision (Repeals) Act 1999 (No. 3 of 1999))
Building Control (General Amendment) Act 1988 (repealed)	No. 12 of 1988	3 May 1988
An Act to amend the Building Control Act 1981 (Note: Building Control Act 1981 (No. 9720)) and the Building Control (Amendment) Act 1986 (Note: Building Control (Amendment) Act 1986 (No. 90 of 1986)) and for other purposes. (Repealed by Statute Law Revision (Repeals) Act 1999 (No. 3 of 1999))
Cancer (Amendment) Act 1988 (repealed)	No. 19 of 1988	17 May 1988
An Act to make further provision with respect to the objects of the Anti-Cancer Council of Victoria, to amend the Cancer Act 1958 (Note: Cancer Act 1958 (No. 6213)) and for other purposes. (Repealed by Statute Law Revision (Repeals) Act 1999 (No. 3 of 1999))
Hospitals Superannuation Act 1988	No. 21 of 1988	17 May 1988
An Act to provide improved benefits under the Hospitals Superannuation Fund, to repeal the Hospitals Superannuation Act 1965 (Note: Hospitals Superannuation Act 1965 (No. 7354)) and certain other Acts and for other purposes.
Local Authorities Superannuation Act 1988	No. 23 of 1988	17 May 1988
An Act to re-enact with changes the law relating to local authorities superannuation, to repeal the Local Authorities Superannuation Act 1958 (Note: Local Authorities Superannuation Act 1958 (No. 6298)) and certain other Acts, to amend certain Acts and for other purposes.
State Bank Act 1988 (repealed)	No. 29 of 1988	17 May 1988
An Act to re-enact the law relating to the State Bank of Victoria and for other purposes. (Repealed by State Bank (Succession of Commonwealth Bank) Act 1990 (No. 94 of 1990))
Supply (1988-89, No. 1) Act 1988 (repealed)	No. 30 of 1988	17 May 1988
An Act to make interim provision for the appropriation of moneys out of the Consolidated Fund for recurrent services and for certain works and purposes for the financial year 1988-89. (Repealed by Statute Law Revision (Repeals) Act 1999 (No. 3 of 1999))
Constitution Act Amendment (Electoral Procedures) Act 1988 (repealed)	No. 31 of 1988	17 May 1988
An Act ill to amend The Constitution Act Amendment Act 1958 (Note: Constitution Act Amendment Act 1958 (No. 6224)) to reform electoral procedures, to amend the Magistrates (Summary Proceedings) Act 1975 (Note: Magistrates (Summary Proceedings) Act 1975 (No. 8731)) and the Senate Elections Act 1958 (Note: Senate Elections Act 1958 (No. 6365)) and for other purposes. (Repealed by Statute Law Revision (Repeals) Act 1999 (No. 3 of 1999))
Transport Superannuation Act 1988	No. 33 of 1988	17 May 1988
An Act to establish a Transport Superannuation Fund, to amend the Borrowing and Investment Powers Act 1987 (Note: Borrowing and Investment Powers Act 1987 (No. 13 of 1987)) and for other purposes.
Works and Services (Ancillary Provisions, No. 1) Act 1988 (repealed)	No. 34 of 1988	17 May 1988
An Act to make ancillary provisions for certain works and purposes for the financial year 1988-89. (Repealed by Statute Law Revision (Repeals) Act 1999 (No. 3 of 1999))
Agricultural Acts (Amendment) Act 1988 (repealed)	No. 35 of 1988	24 May 1988
An Act to amend the Abattoir and Meat Inspection Act 1973, (Note: Abattoir and Meat Inspection Act 1973 (No. 8404)) the Agricultural Chemicals Act 1958, (Note: Fungicides Act 1958 (No. 6257)) the Bees Act 1971, (Note: Bees Act 1971 (No. 8216)) the Broiler Chicken Industry Act 1978, (Note: Broiler Chicken Industry Act 1978 (No. 9199)) the Dairy Industry Act 1984, (Note: Dairy Industry Act 1984 (No. 10171)) the Margarine Act 1975, (Note: Margarine Act 1975 (No. 8720)) the Melbourne Wholesale Fruit and Vegetable Market Trust Act 1977, (Note: Melbourne Wholesale Fruit and Vegetable Market Trust Act 1977 (No. 8993)) the Prevention of Cruelty to Animals Act 1986, (Note: Prevention of Cruelty to Animals Act 1986 (No. 46 of 1986)) the Stock Diseases Act 1968 (Note: Stock Diseases Act 1968 (No. 7724)) and the Tomato Processing Industry Act 1976, (Note: Tomato Processing Industry Act 1976 (No. 8852)) and to repeal the Wine Grape Processing Industry Act 1978. (Note: Wine Grape Processing Industry Act 1978 (No. 9213)) (Repealed by Statute Law Revision (Repeals) Act 1999 (No. 3 of 1999))
Crimes (Computers) Act 1988 (repealed)	No. 36 of 1988	24 May 1988
An Act to amend the Crimes Act 1958 (Note: Crimes Act 1958 (No. 6231)) and for other purposes. (Repealed by Statute Law Revision Act 1995 (No. 11 of 1995))
Medical Treatment Act 1988 (repealed)	No. 41 of 1988	24 May 1988
An Act to create an offence of medical trespass, to make other provision concerning the refusal of medical treatment and for other purposes. (Repealed by Medical Treatment Planning and Decisions Act 2016 (No. 69 of 2016))
Prince Henry's Institute of Medical Research Act 1988	No. 43 of 1988	24 May 1988
An Act to establish the Prince Henry's Institute of Medical Research as a body corporate and for other purposes.
Rural Finance Act 1988	No. 44 of 1988	24 May 1988
An Act relating to the provision of financial services and assistance to rural industries; to provide for the administration of the remaining leases, mortgages, contracts of sale and other interests created under the Land Settlement Act 1959 (Note: Land Settlement Act 1959 (No. 6534)) and the Soldier Settlement Act 1958; (Note: Soldier Settlement Act 1958 (No. 6373)) to repeal the Rural Finance and Settlement Commission Act 1961, (Note: Rural Finance and Settlement Commission Act 1961 (No. 6846)) the Rural Finance Act 1958, (Note: Rural Finance Corporation Act 1958 (No. 6360)) the Land Settlement Act 1959 and the Soldier Settlement Act 1958; to make consequential amendments to certain other Acts; and for other purposes.
State Electricity Commission (Amendment) Act 1988 (repealed)	No. 45 of 1988	24 May 1988
An Act to amend the State Electricity Commission Act 1958 (Note: State Electricity Commission Act 1958 (No. 6377)) and for other purposes. (Repealed by Legislation Reform (Repeals No. 2) Act 2008 (No. 16 of 2008))
Telecommunications (Interception) (State Provisions) Act 1988	No. 46 of 1988	24 May 1988
An Act to enable the Police Force of Victoria to intercept telecommunications in accordance with the Telecommunications (Interception) Act 1979 (Note: Telecommunications (Interception) Act 1979 (No. 114 (Cth))) of the Commonwealth and for other purposes.
Flora and Fauna Guarantee Act 1988	No. 47 of 1988	24 May 1988
An Act to provide for the conservation and management of flora and fauna.
Health (General Amendment) Act 1988	No. 48 of 1988	24 May 1988
An Act to make miscellaneous amendments to the Health Act 1958 (Note: Health Act 1958 (No. 6270)) and for other purposes.
Health Services Act 1988	No. 49 of 1988	24 May 1988
An Act relating to health services, to repeal the Hospitals and Charities Act 1958, (Note: Hospitals and Charities Act 1958 (No. 6274)) to make consequential amendments to certain Acts, to amend the Cancer Act 1958 and for other purposes.
State Superannuation Act 1988	No. 50 of 1988	24 May 1988
An Act to provide improved benefits imder the State Superannuation Fund, to introduce a new scheme for new officers, to repeal the Superannuation Act 1958 (Note: Superannuation Act 1958 (No. 6386)) and certain other Acts, to make consequential amendments to certain other Acts and for other purposes.
Caravan Parks and Movable Dwellings Act 1988 (repealed)	No. 51 of 1988	31 May 1988
An Act to regulate caravan parks and to confer tenancy rights on people who live in caravan parks, and for other purposes. (Repealed by Residential Tenancies Act 1997 (No. 109 of 1997))
Marine Act 1988 or the Marine (Drug, Alcohol and Pollution Control) Act 1988	No. 52 of 1988	31 May 1988
An Act to re-enact with amendments the law relating to the registration and operation of vessels and the pollution of State waters, to implement certain international conventions, to repeal the Marine Act 1958, (Note: Marine Act 1958 (No. 6302)) the Motor Boating Act 1961, (Note: Motor Boating Act 1961 (No. 6832)) the Navigable Waters (Oil Pollution) Act 1960 (Note: Navigable Waters (Oil Pollution) Act 1960 (No. 6705)) and the Harbor Boards Act 1958 (Note: Harbor Boards Act 1958 (No. 6268)) and to amend the Port of Melbourne Authority Act 1958, (Note: Melbourne Harbor Trust Act 1958 (No. 6312)) the Port of Geelong Authority Act 1958, (Note: Geelong Harbor Trust Act 1958 (No. 6262)) the Port of Portland Authority Act 1958 (Note: Portland Harbor Trust Act 1958 (No. 6340)) and certain other Acts and for other purposes.
Subdivision Act 1988	No. 53 of 1988	31 May 1988
An Act relating to the subdivision of land and for other purposes.
Land (Miscellaneous Matters) Act 1988	No. 54 of 1988	9 August 1988
An Act to provide for the revocation of the permanent reservation of certain lands, to facilitate the exchange of certain other land and for other purposes.
Constitution (Local Government) Act 1988 (repealed)	No. 55 of 1988	16 August 1988
An Act to amend the Constitution Act 1975 (Note: Constitution Act 1975 (No. 8750)) with respect to local government in Victoria. (Repealed by Statute Law Revision (Repeals) Act 1999 (No. 3 of 1999))
Appropriation (1988-89, No. 1) Act 1988 (repealed)	No. 56 of 1988	2 November 1988
(Repealed by Statute Law Revision (Repeals) Act 1999 (No. 3 of 1999))
Works and Services (Ancillary Provisions, 1988-89, No. 2) Act 1988 (repealed)	No. 57 of 1988	2 November 1988
An Act to make further ancillary provisions for certain works and purposes for the financial year 1988-89. (Repealed by Statute Law Revision (Repeals) Act 1999 (No. 3 of 1999))
Melbourne College of Advanced Education (Amalgamation) Act 1988	No. 61 of 1988	29 November 1988
An Act to facilitate the amalgamation of the Melbourne College of Advanced Education and The University of Melbourne, to repeal the Melbourne College of Advanced Education Act 1982 (Note: Melbourne College of Advanced Education Act 1982 (No. 9849)) and for other purposes.
Southgate Project (Amendment) Act 1988 (repealed)	No. 63 of 1988	29 November 1988
An Act to amend the Southgate Project Act 1986 (Note: Southgate Project Act 1986 (No. 39 of 1986)) and for other purposes. (Repealed by Statute Law Revision Act 1995 (No. 11 of 1995))
Building Control (Plumbers, Gasfitters and Drainers) (Amendment) Act 1988 (repealed)	No. 64 of 1988	29 November 1988
An Act to amend the Building Control (Plumbers, Gasfitters and Drainers) Act 1985. (Note: Building Control (Plumbers, Gasfitters and Drainers) Act 1985 (No. 10239)) (Repealed by Statute Law Revision Act 1995 (No. 11 of 1995))
Bayside Project Act 1988	No. 67 of 1988	15 December 1988
An Act to facilitate the development of certain land at Port Melbourne and for other purposes.
Liquor Control (Amendment) Act 1988 (repealed)	No. 70 of 1988	15 December 1988
An Act to amend the Liquor Control Act 1987 (Note: Liquor Control Act 1987 (No. 97 of 1987)) and for other purposes. (Repealed by Statute Law Revision Act 1995 (No. 11 of 1995))
Constitution Act Amendment (Electoral Reform) Act 1988	No. 75 of 1988	15 December 1988
An Act to amend The Constitution Act Amendment Act 1958 to provide for the appointment of an independent Electoral Commissioner, to regulate electoral material, to consequentially amend certain other Acts and for other purposes.
Footscray Land Act 1988	No. 79 of 1988	20 December 1988
An Act to facilitate the development of land at Footscray, to revoke the permanent reservation of certain Crown land, to amend the Melbourne and Metropolitan Board of Works Act 1958 and the Port of Melbourne Authority Act 1958 and for other purposes.
Libraries Act 1988	No. 80 of 1988	20 December 1988
An Act to constitute a Libraries Board of Victoria and a Council of the State Library of Victoria, to repeal the Libraries Act 1958 (Note: Libraries Act 1958 (No. 6292)) and the Library Council of Victoria Act 1965 (Note: Library Council of Victoria Act 1965 (No. 7364)) and for other purposes.
Accident Compensation (Disclosure of Information) Act 1988	No. X of 1988	
Accident Compensation (Further Amendment) Act 1988	No. X of 1988	
Borrowing and Investment Powers (Amendment) Act 1988 (repealed)	No. 78 of 1988	
(Repealed by Legislation Reform (Repeals No. 2) Act 2008 (No. 16 of 2008))
Business Franchise Acts (Amendment) Act 1988	No. X of 1988	
Corrections (Remission) Act 1988	No. X of 1988	
Country Fire Authority (Amendment) Act 1988	No. X of 1988	
Crimes (Custody and Investigation) Act 1988 (repealed)	No. 37 of 1988	
(Repealed by Statute Law Revision Act 2013 (No. 70 of 2013)
Crimes (Family Violence) (Amendment) Act 1988	No. X of 1988	
Crimes (Fingerprinting) Act 1988 (repealed)	No. 38 of 1988	
(Repealed by Statute Law Revision Act 2013 (No. 70 of 2013)
Criminal Injuries Compensation (Amendment) Act 1988	No. X of 1988	
Dairy Industry (Amendment) Act 1988	No. X of 1988	
Deputy Ombudsman (Police Complaints) Act 1988	No. X of 1988	
Energy Consumption Levy (Amendment) Act 1988	No. X of 1988	
Environment Protection (Amendment) Act 1988	No. X of 1988	
Exhibition (Amendment) Act 1988	No. X of 1988	
Firearms (Amendment) Act 1988	No. X of 1988	
Fisheries (Abalone) (Amendment) Act 1988	No. X of 1988	
Land Tax (Amendment) Act 1988	No. X of 1988	
Legal Profession Practice (Incorporation) Act 1988	No. X of 1988	
Local Government (Validation) Act 1988	No. X of 1988	
Melbourne Corporation (Election of Council) (Amendment) Act 1988	No. X of 1988	
Mental Health (Amendment) Act 1988	No. X of 1988	
National Parks (Amendment) Act 1988	No. X of 1988	
National Parks and Wildlife (Amendment) Act 1988	No. X of 1988	
Pathology Services Accreditation (Amendment) Act 1988	No. X of 1988	
Pay-roll Tax (Amendment) Act 1988	No. X of 1988	
Pipelines (Amendment) Act 1988	No. X of 1988	
Planning and Environment (Amendment) Act 1988	No. X of 1988	
Public Service (Amendment) Act 1988	No. X of 1988	
Racing (Amendment) Act 1988	No. X of 1988	
Racing (Further Amendment) Act 1988	No. X of 1988	
Retail Tenancies (Amendment) Act 1988	No. X of 1988	
Road Safety (Photographic Detection Devices) Act 1988	No. X of 1988	
Shop Trading (Amendment) Act 1988	No. X of 1988	
Stamps (Amendment) Act 1988	No. X of 1988	
Stamps (Further Amendment) Act 1988	No. X of 1988	
Stamps (Secondary Mortgage Market) Act 1988	No. X of 1988	
Summary Offences (Amendment) Act 1988	No. X of 1988	
Superannuation Acts (Amendment) Act 1988	No. X of 1988	
Transport Accident (Amendment) Act 1988	No. X of 1988	
Trustee Companies (Amendment) Act 1988	No. X of 1988	
Victorian Arts Centre (Amendment) Act 1988 (repealed)	No. 77 of 1988	
(Repealed by Legislation Reform (Repeals No. 2) Act 2008 (No. 16 of 2008))
Victorian Relief Committee (Amendment) Act 1988	No. X of 1988	
Water and Sewerage Authorities (Restructuring) (Postponement of Expiry) Act 1988	No. X of 1988	

== Sources ==
- "1988 Victorian Historical Acts". AustLII.
