= Interlocutor =

Interlocutor may refer to:

- Interlocutor (politics), someone who informally explains the views of a government and also can relay messages back to a government
- Interlocutor (linguistics), a participant in a discourse
- Interlocutor, the master of ceremonies of a minstrel show
- Interlocutor, in Scots law, an interlocutory order

== See also ==
- Interlocutory, referring to a type of legal order, sentence, decree, or judgment
- Interlocutory appeal
- Interlocutory injunction
