= Interlocutory =

Legal term

Interlocutory /ˌɪntərˈlɒkjəˌtɔːri/ is a legal term which can refer to an order, sentence, decree, or judgment, given in an intermediate stage between the commencement and conclusion of a cause of action, used to provide a temporary or provisional decision on an issue. Thus, an interlocutory order is not final and is not subject to immediate appeal.

In many U.S. legal systems, interlocutory orders are not appealable, save for in a few extraordinary cases. Interlocutory orders are orders that are issued by a court while a case is still ongoing, before the final resolution of the case. When the case is concluded, any aspect of an interlocutory order that has not become moot may be challenged in an appeal from the final judgment. However, in other legal systems, such as in England and Wales, in Hong Kong, and in Canada, interlocutory orders in civil matters can be appealed by leave of the appellate court. In criminal matters in Canada, the general rule is that there are no interlocutory appeals, except where Parliament has expressly provided. Australian courts and tribunals generally discourage appeals against interlocutory decisions.

In Scots law an interlocutory order is called an "interlocutor".

== See also ==
- Interlocutory appeal
- Interlocutory injunction
- Interlocutor (disambiguation)
