= Telecommunications Act 1997 =

Act of the Parliament of Australia

Parliament of Australia
- Long title: An Act relating to telecommunications, and for related purposes
- Citation: No. 47 of 1997
- Territorial extent: Australia
- Passed by: House of Representatives
- Passed: 26 March 1997
- Passed by: Senate
- Passed: 26 March 1997
- Assented to by: Governor-General of Australia
- Assented to: 14 April 1997
- Commenced: 1 July 1997
- Administered by: Australian Communications and Media Authority (ACMA); Department of Infrastructure, Transport, Regional Development, Communications and the Arts

Amended by
- Telecommunications Legislation Amendment (Competition and Consumer) Act 2020
- Status: Amended

The Telecommunications Act 1997 is an Act of Parliament of the Commonwealth of Australia. It establishes the principal legislative framework governing telecommunications networks, carriers, carriage service providers, telecommunications infrastructure, industry self-regulation, consumer protections, privacy obligations and telecommunications security in Australia. The Act was enacted as part of the restructuring and liberalisation of Australia's telecommunications sector and forms the foundation of the modern Australian telecommunications regulatory regime. It works alongside the Competition and Consumer Act 2010, Telecommunications (Consumer Protection and Service Standards) Act 1999, Telecommunications (Interception and Access) Act 1979, Privacy Act 1988 and Radiocommunications Act 1992. The Act establishes Australia's carrier licensing regime, regulates carriage service providers and content service providers, provides for telecommunications industry codes and standards, protects the confidentiality of communications, and defines powers relating to telecommunications infrastructure and emergency communications services.

== Overview ==
The objects of the Act include promoting:

- the long-term interests of end-users of telecommunications services;
- the efficiency and international competitiveness of the Australian telecommunications industry;
- accessible and affordable telecommunications services;
- industry competition and innovation;
- consumer safeguards; and
- responsible telecommunications practices.

The Act adopts a co-regulatory approach under which telecommunications industry participants may develop industry codes that are registered and overseen by regulators.

== Regulatory framework ==
The Act assigns responsibilities to a number of regulatory and consumer bodies involved in the Australian telecommunications sector.

=== Australian Communications and Media Authority ===
The Australian Communications and Media Authority (ACMA) is the principal regulator under the Act. ACMA is responsible for carrier licensing, numbering administration, industry code registration, industry standards, investigations, public inquiries, compliance and enforcement.

=== Australian Competition and Consumer Commission ===
The Australian Competition and Consumer Commission (ACCC) performs telecommunications competition and infrastructure access functions under legislation operating alongside the Act. The ACCC also participates in the development and oversight of telecommunications regulatory arrangements.

=== Consumer representation ===
The Act provides for the funding of consumer representation and telecommunications consumer research. Funding under this framework supports the Australian Communications Consumer Action Network (ACCAN), Australia's peak communications consumer advocacy body.

=== Privacy and communications information ===
Part 13 of the Act regulates the use and disclosure of telecommunications information by carriers and carriage service providers. The privacy framework operates alongside the Privacy Act 1988 and involves the Office of the Australian Information Commissioner.

=== Telecommunications Industry Ombudsman ===
The Telecommunications Industry Ombudsman (TIO) handles complaints from residential and small business consumers about telephone and internet services. Membership of the TIO scheme is required under the companion Telecommunications (Consumer Protection and Service Standards) Act 1999.

== Major provisions ==
Major areas regulated by the Act include:

- carrier licensing and carrier obligations;
- carriage service providers and content service providers;
- telecommunications industry codes and standards;
- telecommunications privacy and confidentiality;
- emergency call services;
- numbering and electronic addressing;
- telecommunications infrastructure deployment;
- access to land for telecommunications facilities;
- network security and protection measures; and
- monitoring and enforcement powers.

== See also ==
- Australian law
- Australian Communications and Media Authority
- Australian Competition and Consumer Commission
- Australian Communications Consumer Action Network
- Australian Law Reform Commission
- Privacy Act 1988
- Radiocommunications Act 1992
- Telecommunications (Consumer Protection and Service Standards) Act 1999
- Telecommunications (Interception and Access) Act 1979
- Mass surveillance in Australia
- Telecommunications (Interception and Access) Amendment (Data Retention) Act 2015
