= Australian Communications Consumer Action Network =

- Abbreviation: ACCAN
- Type: Consumer advocacy organisation
- Headquarters: Sydney, New South Wales
- Region served: Australia
- Website: accan.org.au

The Australian Communications Consumer Action Network (ACCAN) is the peak body representing consumers of communications products and services in Australia, covering telephone, internet and broadcasting services. It receives Australian Government funding to carry out its work, part of which it distributes to external researchers through a grants scheme.

== Funding ==
ACCAN is funded by the Commonwealth of Australia under section 593 of the Telecommunications Act 1997. This funding is recovered from a levy on telecommunications carriers. The Government announced additional funding for ACCAN in 2024.

== Advocacy and campaigns ==
ACCAN makes submissions to government and regulatory inquiries, commissions research, and campaigns on communications issues affecting consumers. Its stated priorities include the affordability, reliability and quality of communications services, consumer protections, public safety, and accessibility.

=== Affordability ===
ACCAN's "No Australian Left Offline" campaign proposes a concessional broadband product for low-income households, under which NBN Co would offer an unlimited service at a reduced wholesale price. It has criticised above-inflation mobile price rises by the major carriers.

=== Mobile coverage and roaming ===
In July 2026 ACCAN released a report calling for domestic mobile roaming to be mandated in Australia, arguing that roaming had helped drive down prices in other countries. The Australian Competition and Consumer Commission (ACCC) had examined mandatory roaming in 2017 and decided against it. ACCAN has campaigned for more accurate and comparable mobile coverage information. From 30 June 2026, rules made by the Australian Communications and Media Authority (ACMA) required mobile providers to rate coverage as good, moderate, basic or none. Later reporting found some customers considered the new maps still inaccurate.

=== Emergency calling and network outages ===
ACCAN advocates for reforms to the Triple Zero emergency calling service, including a national register of telecommunications outages and minimum network performance standards. Its 2026 survey on the reliability of Triple Zero drew attention from the telecommunications industry and regulators. After a nationwide Telstra outage in July 2026, ACCAN said the company's compensation process placed the onus on affected customers to lodge claims. A separate outage affected Vodafone (TPG Telecom) customers in June 2026. Following earlier outages, the Australian Government established rules in 2024 requiring telecommunications providers to communicate with affected customers during outages.

=== Consumer protections ===
After a rise in complaints to the Telecommunications Industry Ombudsman (TIO) in late 2017, ACCAN called for improved consumer protections. ACCAN is a member of the Fair Call Coalition, a group of consumer organisations that called on the ACMA to decline to register the industry-drafted Telecommunications Consumer Protections (TCP) Code and to regulate the industry directly. The ACMA declined to register the code on 24 October 2025, and on 27 March 2026 announced it would replace it with a mandatory industry standard. ACCAN was among consumer groups that welcomed the introduction of an unfair trading practices prohibition in 2026.

=== Scams ===
ACCAN has been among consumer groups advocating for stronger scam protections. In the 2024–25 Budget the Australian Government committed $37.3 million towards mandatory scam codes, including funding for the ACMA to oversee and enforce scam call and SMS codes and to establish a mandatory SMS Sender ID Register.

=== Spectrum ===
ACCAN campaigns for radiofrequency spectrum to be allocated in the consumer interest, and has commissioned economic research on the pricing of expiring spectrum licences. The issue was reported in 2025 in the context of the ACMA's decision to renew expiring licences rather than auction them.

=== Digital services ===
ACCAN calls for consumer protections for digital services, including a digital duty of care and a digital ombud to resolve complaints about digital platforms.

=== National Broadband Network ===
ACCAN campaigned for a government scheme to monitor NBN broadband performance. The ACCC established such a scheme and selected SamKnows to operate the NBN testing system. It has since taken part in scrutiny of NBN Co's expenditure and pricing, including its demand forecasts and its plan to shut down the copper network in favour of fibre.

== Research ==
ACCAN undertakes and funds research on communications issues through an independent grants program, commissioned research, and its own consumer surveys. Through the Independent Grants Program it funds external organisations to work on systemic communications consumer issues, with applications assessed by an independent panel. Commissioned work has included economic analysis of spectrum licence renewals by Professor Richard Holden of the University of New South Wales. Since 2025 ACCAN has run the Consumer Sentiment Tracker, a recurring national survey of how consumers experience communications services, with later waves examining mobile network reliability and experiences of contacting Triple Zero.
