= ABC v Lenah Game Meats =

2001 High Court of Australia decision

- Court: High Court of Australia
- Full case name: ABC v Lenah Game Meats Pty Ltd
- Argued: Nov 2001
- Decided: 15 November 2001
- Transcript: eresources.hcourt.gov.au/downloadPdf/2001/HCA/63

Court membership
- Judges sitting: Chief Justice Murray Gleeson; Justice Mary Gaudron; Justice William Gummow; Justice Michael Kirby; Justice Kenneth Hayne; Justice Ian Callinan

Keywords
- Injunction Torts Trespass Constitutional Law

ABC v Lenah Game Meats was a court case from the High Court of Australia. It is significant as one of the most important Australian court decisions dealing with protection of privacy

== Background ==
Lenah Game Meats (Lenah), a Tasmanian possum-meat processor, had hidden cameras placed on their property by an unknown third party. Footage showing possum slaughter at the facility was passed to Animal Liberation, and then onto ABC.

== Trial ==
Lenah sought an interlocutory injunction to stop ABC from airing the footage on the 7:30 Report, arguing there would be harm to its business, as well as a breach of privacy and confidentiality. The full court of the Supreme Court of Tasmania had previously granted an injunction restraining the broadcast, and ABC appealed to the High Court of Australia.

=== Issues ===
The Court considered three key issues. Firstly whether Lenah had grounds against the ABC for breach of privacy, confidentiality, or trespass. Secondly whether material obtained unlawfully by a third party could be prevented from being broadcast by the ABC. Thirdly whether the public's right to know outweighed any harm to Lenah's business or reputation.

=== Judgment ===
The majority of the High Court found that:

- Possum processing was a licensed, non-secluded activity, and not a private act. Accordingly, there could be no claim about privacy or confidentiality attached to the footage.
- Lenah was a corporation and Australia did not recognise a general tort of privacy for corporations.
- ABC did not facilitate the trespass and simply received footage from a third party. That, by itself, did not justify restraining the broadcast.
- There was a public interest and freedom of press consideration given that curtailing the broadcast would unduly restrict media in reporting matters of public concern. Furthermore, the killing and processing of native Australian creatures for export was as a matter of public interest.

=== Decision ===
The High Court overturned the lower court's injunction, and decided that ABC was free to broadcast the footage.

== Significance ==
The Court found that there is no broad legal protection for the right to privacy under the common law in Australia. It also found that it was of public interest to broadcast the footage, given that the possums are a native species.
