= Privacy Act 1988 =

Australian law

Parliament of Australia
- Long title: An Act to make provision to protect the privacy of individuals, and for related purpose
- Citation: Privacy Act 1988 (Cth) No.119, 1988
- Enacted by: House of Representatives
- Enacted: 1988
- Administered by: Office of the Australian Information Commissioner
- Status: Amended

The Privacy Act 1988 is an Australian law dealing with privacy. Section 14 of the Act stipulates a number of privacy rights known as the Australian Privacy Principles (APPs). These principles apply to Australian Government and Australian Capital Territory agencies or private sector organisations contracted to these governments, organisations and small businesses who provide a health service, as well as to private organisations with an annual turnover exceeding AUD $3 million (with some specific exceptions). The principles govern when and how personal information can be collected by these entities. Information can only be collected if it is relevant to the agencies' functions. Upon this collection, that law mandates that Australians have the right to know why information about them is being acquired and who will see the information. Those in charge of storing the information have obligations to ensure such information is neither lost nor exploited. An Australian will also have the right to access the information unless this is specifically prohibited by law.

== 2000 amendments ==
The Privacy Act was amended in 2000 to cover the private sector. Schedule three of the Privacy Act sets out a significantly different set of privacy principles, the National Privacy Principles (NPPs). These apply to private sector organisations (including not for profit organisations) with a turnover exceeding three million dollars, other than health service providers or traders in personal information. These principles extend to the transfer of personal information out of Australia.

== 2014 amendments ==
The Australian Privacy Principles (APPs) replaced the National Privacy Principles and Information Privacy Principles on 12 March 2014 via the Privacy Amendment (Enhancing Privacy Protection) Act 2012, which amended the Privacy Act 1988. The act was further amended in 2017 and December 2022, significantly enhancing the protection of privacy in Australia. These amendments included increased maximum penalties for data breaches and enhanced enforcement powers for the Office of the Australian Information Commissioner (OAIC).

The Privacy Act Review commenced in 2020 following recommendations by the Australian Competition and Consumer Commission in its 2019 Digital Platforms Inquiry. On 28 September 2023, the Australian government released its response to the Privacy Act Review Report, committing to further modernising privacy regulations.

== State legislation ==
Privacy principles that are the same as the NPPs are also included in the legislation applying to the public sectors of some Australian States and Territories, namely the Information Privacy Act 2000 (Victoria), Information Act 2002 (Northern Territory), Personal Information Protection Act 2004 (Tasmania), and the Health Records and Information Privacy Act 2002 (New South Wales).

== Administration ==
Australia's privacy principles, the APPs, depend upon the meaning of "personal information" (as defined in the Privacy Act 1988 section six). This term has not yet been interpreted in a restrictive way as has been "personal data" in the UK Durant case.

The Privacy Act creates an Office of the Privacy Commissioner and a Privacy Commissioner in Australia. The OAIC is responsible for investigating breaches of the Australian Privacy Principles (APPs) and credit reporting provisions. The OAIC’s powers include accepting enforceable undertakings, seeking civil penalties in the case of serious or repeated breaches of privacy, and conducting assessments of privacy performance for both Australian Government agencies and businesses. Section 36 of the act states that Australians may appeal to the commissioner if they feel their privacy rights have been compromised, unless the privacy was violated by an organization that has its own dispute resolution mechanisms under an approved Privacy Code. The Commissioner, who may decide to investigate complaints and, in some cases must investigate, can under section 44 obtain relevant evidence from other people. There is no appeal to a Court or Tribunal against decisions of the Commissioner except in limited circumstances. Section 45 of the Privacy Act allows the Commissioner to interview the people themselves, and the people might have to swear an oath to tell the truth. Anyone who fails to answer the Commissioner may be subject to a fine of up to $2,000 and the possibility of year-long imprisonment (under section 65). Under section 64 of the Privacy Act, the Commissioner is also given immunity against any lawsuits that they might be subjected to for carrying out of their duties.

If the commissioner will not hear a complaint, an Australian may receive legal assistance under section 63. If a complaint is taken to the Federal Court of Australia, in certain circumstances others may receive legal assistance.

== Review of the Act ==
The Australian Law Reform Commission completed an inquiry into the state of Australia's privacy laws in 2008. The Report entitled For Your Information: Australian Privacy Law and Practice recommended significant changes be made to the Privacy Act, as well as the introduction of a statutory cause of action for breach of privacy. The Australian Government committed in October 2009 to implementing a large number of the recommendations that the Australian Law Reform Commission had made in its report.

== See also ==
- Telecommunications (Interception and Access) Act 1979
- Telecommunications Act 1997
