= Meadows v Minister for Justice, Equality and Law Reform =

Irish Supreme Court case

Meadows v Minister for Justice, Equality, and Law Reform
- Coat of arms of Ireland
- Court: Supreme Court of Ireland
- Full case name: Meadows v Minister for Justice, Equality, and Law Reform
- Decided: 21 January 2010
- Citations: [2010] IESC 3; [2010] 2 IR 701; [2011] 2 ILRM 157

Case history
- Appealed from: Gilligan J (High Court) 4 November 2003

Court membership
- Judges sitting: Murray CJ, Kearns P, Denham J, Hardiman J, Fennelly J.

Case opinions
- Decision by: Murray CJ
- Concurrence: Fennelly J, Denham J, and Murray CJ
- Dissent: Hardiman J and Kearns P

Keywords
- judicial review; Proportionality (law); Immigration; Female genital mutilation

In the case of Meadows v Minister for Justice, Equality, and Law Reform [2010] IESC 3; [2010] 2 IR 701; [2011] 2 ILRM 157, the Supreme Court of Ireland found that the proportionality test should be used when reviewing administrative actions that implicate fundamental rights protected by both the Irish Constitution and the European Convention on Human Rights. While the case concerned an application for judicial review of an asylum decision, the decision was described as carrying “implications for the whole body of Irish administrative law”.

== Background ==
The appellant in the case, Ms Meadows, was a Nigerian national who had sought refugee status. According to the appellant, she faced threats to her life in Nigeria and also feared being forced into an arranged marriage and being subjected to female genital mutilation (FGM) against her will. Ms Meadows was unsuccessful in her claim of refugee status and subsequently the Refugee Appeals Tribunal found that Ms Meadows was not a refugee within the meaning of section 2 the Refugee Act 1996 as amended, affirming the prior decision. While the Tribunal accepted that FGM constituted torture, the Tribunal found that the appellant had not “established a credible connection between her circumstances, on the one hand, and forced marriage and FGM on the other”.

In response to a letter from the Minister for Justice giving notice of a proposed deportation order, counsel for the appellant made representations to the Minister, arguing that her removal would contravene Article 3 of the European Convention on Human Rights. The letter emphasised the request to be permitted to submit expert evidence on Nigeria that outlined the likelihood of subjection to FGM. The Minister's letter had confined itself to stating that he was satisfied that the provisions of section 5 (prohibition of refoulement) of the Refugee Act 1996 had been complied with. Without communicating further with the appellant or her legal representatives, the Minister made a formal deportation order.

The appellant sought judicial review of the deportation decision in the High Court. In order to be granted judicial review of the decision, “substantial grounds” would have to be established. There was “a point of contention” as regards the appropriate means by which grounds for review could be assessed. While some judges had considered applications for leave to challenge administrative decisions under the standard of “anxious scrutiny”, other judges had applied the standard of unreasonableness as laid down in O'Keeffe v An Bord Pleanála [1993] 1 IR 3. The High Court refused Ms Meadow's application for leave, but certified a point of law to the Supreme Court. The question was put: “In determining the reasonableness of an administrative decision which affects or concerns constitutional rights or fundamental rights, is it correct to apply the standard as set out in O'Keeffe v An Bord Pleanála?”

== Supreme Court ==
The question certified to the Supreme Court was much broader than Ms Meadow's application for leave. The decision would have relevance “to all administrative decisions, not just those in the field of immigration and asylum, and all constitutional or fundamental rights, not just those which might have been implicated in the instant case”. The decision of the Supreme Court was reached in a three to two majority decision, with the majority of the Court rejecting the “anxious scrutiny” standard and finding that proportionality was relevant to the assessment of reasonableness of administrative decisions affecting fundamental rights.

Following an assessment of the standards of review of administrative decisions in Ireland, Denham J asserted that where “fundamental rights are in issue, such rights form part of the constitutional jurisdiction of the court in which a reasonable decision is required to be made and, if made, analysed”. In considering the facts of Ms Meadow's appeal, Fennelly J referred to the absence of a reference in the decision of the Minister to relevant material concerning the prevalence of FGM in Nigeria. According to Fennelly J, “the difficulty posed by the form of the Minister’s decision is not merely his failure to provide reason for his decision, though that is undoubtedly the case, but that the decision is defective as a result”.
