= Interlocutory injunction =

Type of court order

An interlocutory injunction is a court order to compel or prevent a party from doing certain acts pending the final determination of the case. It is an order made at an interim stage during the trial, and is usually issued to maintain the status quo until judgment can be made.

== Jurisdictions ==
=== Australia ===
In Australia, the High Court in ABC v Lenah Game Meats stated that the purpose of the interlocutory injunction is to preserve identifiable legal or equitable rights. The basic proposition remains that where interlocutory injunctive relief is sought in a Judicature system court, it is necessary to identify the legal (which may be statutory) or equitable rights which are to be determined at trial and in respect of which there is sought final relief which may or may not be injunctive in nature. In another Australian High Court decision, Castlemaine Tooheys Ltd v South Australia, Mason CJ outlined another requirement for establishing an interlocutory injunction. He suggested that the plaintiff had to show that 'irreparable injury' would be suffered, for which common law damages would not be adequate compensation, unless an injunction was granted. The main difficulty associated with granting an interlocutory injunction is that the court must consider whether the likelihood of a legal action being established is sufficiently strong for the injunction to be granted.

=== Canada ===
The Federal Court of Canada has of recent years been reluctant to grant interlocutory injunctions, having set a high bar for the evidence of irreparable harm. In contrast, the Supreme Court of British Columbia, which has concurrent jurisdiction with the Federal Court of Canada on many issues taken a lower threshold test with respect to finding irreparable harm.

In Ontario, interlocutory injunctions are regulated by Rule 40 of the Ontario Rules of Civil Procedure.

=== Malaysia ===
An interlocutory injunction was sought by property owners Heah Seok Yeong in the case of Sivaperuman v. Heah Seok Yeong Realty Sdn Bhd in the Federal Court of Malaysia in 1978. Sivaperuman had been dismissed from his work at the Sungei Chinoh Estate in Perak, but had remained in residence on the estate. While the wording in the injunction called for Sivaperuman not to occupy the site pending a judicial decision on the property owners' case, the court noted that this "prohibitory" wording was in reality a form of "mandatory" wording which required him to vacate the property in advance of a court decision to this effect. Abdoolcader J. noted that in Malaysia "an interim or interlocutory mandatory injunction is never granted before trial save in exceptional and extremely rare cases".

== See also ==
- Interlocutory
- Interlocutory appeal
- Interlocutor (disambiguation)
