= Telecommunications (Interception and Access) Act 1979 =

Act of the Parliament of Australia

Parliament of Australia
- Long title: An Act to prohibit the interception of, and other access to, telecommunications except where authorised in special circumstances or for the purpose of tracing the location of callers in emergencies, and for related purposes
- Assented to: 25 October 1979
- Status: Amended

The Telecommunications (Interception and Access) Act 1979 (formerly Telecommunications (Interception) Act 1979, commonly referred as the TIA Act) is an Act of the Parliament of Australia which prohibits the unauthorised interception of communications or access to stored communications, with certain exceptions. The legislation was amended by the Telecommunications (Interception and Access) Amendment (Data Retention) Act 2015.

== Access to telecommunications data under the Act ==
Under the 1979 Act, the Australian Security and Intelligence Organization (ASIO) and 'enforcement agencies' can access telecommunications data by issuing an internal, or intra-organization, authorization.

During the 2012–2013 inquiry into Australia's national security legislation conducted by the Parliamentary Joint Committee on Intelligence and Security (PJCIS), the Attorney General's Department issued a document detailing what it considered to be telecommunications data. This included "information that allowed a communication to occur", such as the date, time and duration of the communication, the devices involved in the communication and the location of those devices such as mobile phone tower and "information about the parties to the communication", such as their names and addresses.

Section 5 of the Act defines an enforcement agency to include the Australian Federal Police (AFP), the police force of a State or Territory, the Australian Customs and Border Protection Service, crime commissions, anti-corruption bodies and the CrimTrac Agency. The definition also includes an allowance enabling organizations whose remit either involves the administration of law involving a financial penalty or the administration of a law to protect taxation revenue to access telecommunications data.

The head of an enforcement agency, the deputy head of an agency or a management level officer or employee of an agency, given permission in writing by the head of the agency, have the power to authorize access to telecommunications data. For ASIO, authorizations for access to telecommunications data can only be made when individual making that authorization is "satisfied that the disclosure would be in connection with the performance by the Organization of its functions. ASIO must also comply with guidelines issued under Section 8A of the Australian Security Intelligence Organisation Act 1979. These guidelines demand that the initiation and continuation of investigations shall only be authorized by the Director General, or an officer at or above Executive Level 2 authorised by the Director-General for that purpose; and that any means used for obtaining information must be proportionate to the gravity of the threat posed and the probability of its occurrence.

In 2012–13, more than 80 Commonwealth, State and Territory enforcement agencies accessed telecommunications data under the 1979 Act. In that same time period, more than 330,640 authorizations were dispensed allowing access to data. These authorizations resulted in 546,500 disclosures.

== 2013–2014 comprehensive revision ==
On 12 December 2013, the Senate Legal and Constitutional Affairs References Committee began a Comprehensive revision of the Telecommunications (Interception and Access) Act 1979 (the Act), with regard to the recommendations of the Australian Law Reform Commission For Your Information: Australian Privacy Law and Practice report, dated May 2008, particularly recommendation 71.2; and recommendations relating to the Act from the Parliamentary Joint Committee on Intelligence and Security Inquiry into the potential reforms of Australia's National Security Legislation report, dated May 2013.

Their report was supposed to be tabled 10 June 2014, but on 14 May 2014, the Senate granted an extension of time for reporting until 27 August 2014.

== Annual reports ==
Annual reports are issued on the use of the act by the Australian Government Attorney General's Department.

== See also ==
- Australian law
- Australian Law Reform Commission
- Telecommunications Act 1997
- Privacy Act 1988
- Mass surveillance in Australia
- Telecommunications (Interception and Access) Amendment (Data Retention) Act 2015
