= Recognition (family law) =

Process whereby a man is recognised as the father of a child

In family law, recognition is the process in some jurisdictions whereby a man is recognised as the father of a child in situations of no presumption of paternity, generally because the mother is unwed. Historically, the Roman law principle of mater semper certa est (the mother is always certain) causes the action was not available to mothers, but the introduction of in-vitro fertilisation has changed that to change. Recognition is an act that confers legitimacy on the child.

== Overview ==
When a child is born the mother is known, but the father is not certain. When the mother is married, the husband is presumed to be the father (see presumption of legitimacy). When the mother is unmarried, some jurisdictions require the father to take extra steps to be recognised as the father, the presumption of paternity does not apply. The laws vary between jurisdictions but common themes are:

- the mother must give consent
- a child can only be 'recognised' once
- if the child is old enough it must also give consent
- it can often be done prior to the birth of the child

There is no requirement that the recogniser actually be the biological father. In fact, if the child already has a legal father (by the presumption of paternity or by prior recognition) the biological father may not be allowed to recognise their own biological child unless the legal father voluntarily denies fatherhood; a child may only have one legal father. This can happen in cases where the presumed father discovers a child is not their biological child (see paternity fraud). In this case the law holds the rights of the "social father" above those of the "biological father".

In all cases it is a voluntary act by the father to recognise a child.

Recognition is not generally possible in the case of mothers under the principle of Mater semper certa est (The mother is always certain). However, it may be possible in the case of anonymous birth.

=== History ===
The Napoleonic Code in 1804 had the concept of recognition (Book 1, Title VII) and was a major influence on the civil codes of much of continental Europe due to the Napoleonic Wars, and throughout the world due to European colonies. It prohibited paternity suits and claims for child support in the case where both the mother and father were unwed. The purpose was to protect the legally married heterosexual reproductive family, there was no room in this system for natural children, mothers outside of marriage, and involuntary paternity. In an era without DNA testing, the discussions often revolved around evidence.

In the modern era DNA testing has made definitive proof of paternity possible but also the concept of parenthood has expanded (e.g. same sex parenting). Intersection with the rights of children, state support of children and gender equality means this is a rapidly evolving area of law.

=== Worldwide ===
Similar concepts exist in Asian countries for the same reason: the protection of married heterosexual men from paternity suits from unmarried women. However, even there is introduction of DNA testing has changed the situation in recent years.

== The Netherlands ==
Article 199 of Book 1 of the Burgerlijk Wetboek determines that the man who recognises a child becomes the child's legal father. This can be done by a public instrument, or by an act of recognition, completed by an officer of the register office. It also the lists situations on which recognition may be considered invalid.

- The blood relationship between the recogniser and the mother is such that it would not be possible to marry.
- The recogniser has not reached the age of 16.
- The mother has not given consent (if the child has not reached the age of 16).
- The child has not given consent (if the child is older than 12)
- the child already has two legal parents.

The requirement for the mother to consent can be overridden by a court only if the recogniser is the biological father, or the lifelong partner of the mother consented to an act that could have led to the birth of the child unless it would disrupt the relationship between the mother and the child, or it would not be in the best interests of the child.

The act of recognising a child does not automatically grant legal guardianship, which must be applied for separately via court order.

Since 2014, the act of recognition is also available to women who wish to be recognised as the mother of a child born to another women, such as if they are in a lesbian relationship.

In 2012, over 90% of all children of unwed mothers were recognised before the first year of age. Of the children born in 2000, only 9% remained unrecognised in 2012.

Denial of fatherhood is possible only if the presumed father is not the biological father. The procedure can be initiated by the father, the mother or the child.

- The mother within one year of the birth of the child
- The father within one year of becoming aware that he is not the biological father
- The child within three years of becoming aware of his biological father is or within three years of reaching the age of majority.

== Belgium ==
Recognition in Belgium is set out in Article 315 and subsequent articles of the Belgian Burgerlijk Wetboek.

- A child born to a married woman or within 300 days of divorce has the husband as legal father (presumption of paternity)
- The presumption does not apply if the presumed parents were not (formally) living together 300 days prior to the birth, unless the presumed parents make a declaration at the registration of the birth.
- The recognition can occur at birth, or later via any legal instrument, with the exception of a testament.
- A child can be recognised only once, subsequent acts of recognition are invalid as long as the previous acts are valid.
  - If there is no mother on the birth certificate, and act of recognition can be done by a woman.
  - If there is no legal father, another women may recognise the child. The child will then legally have two mothers, the second mother is then referred to as 'meemoeder' ("co-mother").

If the man/woman recognising a child is married to someone other than the legal mother of the child, then the act of recognition cannot be enforced until the spouse has been notified.

A challenge to the presumed legal fatherhood can be started:

- by the mother, within one year of the birth;
- by the legal father, within one year of discovering they are not the biological father;
- by the biological father, within one year of discovering they are the biological father;
- by the child, no earlier than the age of 12 and no later than the age of 22, or within one year of discovery the legal father is not the biological father.

A challenge cannot succeed if the legal father is the social father; that is, they act as a father toward the child, and they are considered the father by others (in possession of status – bezit van staat).

== France ==
Whether the parents are married or not, maternal affiliation is automatically established once the name of the woman is on the birth certificate. By contrast, if the parents are not married to each other, the presumption of paternity does not apply. By article 312 and the following articles of the Civil Code, paternity may be assumed in this case by a man wishing to recognise the child, by a declaration made in a public instrument before:

- a registrar, recognition is inserted into the birth certificate if it is made simultaneously with the declaration of birth, otherwise by explicit act.
- a notary, by deed, for example a valid testament.
- a court (the statement is inserted in the minutes of hearing).

Recognition can be done before birth ("déclaration sur le ventre"), during the declaration of birth or afterwards.

France recognises the possibility of anonymous birth for unwed women, in which case the mother's name does not appear on the birth certificate. In this case recognition by the mother after the fact is also possible.

== Germany ==
The legal framework for the recognition of paternity is defined in section 1594 of the German Civil Code.

A child has in certain circumstances (initially) no legal father. This is always the case where no legal presumption of paternity exists, for example if at the time of birth the mother is unmarried or divorced or the marriage is legally annulled, or if the husband is deceased more than 300 days before the child's birth. The same applies to a child whose origin is unclear (a foundling) or if the previous paternity in the context of paternity fraud was excluded.

In these cases, a recognition of paternity by a man together with the consent of the child's mother results in the legal paternity of the child. Whether the recogniser is also the biological father of the child is irrelevant; the legislature intended to create with the process of the recognition of paternity the possibility for legal paternity for men that fill an actual father role ("social father"), in the absence of a biological father (for example in blended families). The act of recognition is not an assertion by a man that he is in fact the biological father of the child.

== Poland ==
Family and Guardianship Code in art. 72 indicates that the recognition of paternity can occur if

- there is no presumption that the father of the child is the husband of the mother (such presumption exists if the child was born during the marriage or before three hundred days after the divorce).
- the presumption has been rebutted (this can only occur as a result of an action for denial of paternity).

In the case of any of the above two situations, paternity can occur by the acknowledgement of paternity by the father or by judgement of a court.

The statement necessary to establish paternity may be submitted by a person if they are at least 16 years of age and there are no grounds for legal incapacitation.

If a man having recognised paternity does not have full legal capacity, he may make a statement necessary for the recognition of paternity only before a court guardianship.

The recognition is unallowed if a child is major.

== See also ==
- Paternity law
