= Affiliation (family law) =

In law, affiliation (from Latin affiliare, "to adopt as a son") was previously the term to describe legal establishment of paternity. The following description, for the most part, was written in the early 20th century, and it should be understood as a historical document.

== Affiliation procedures in England ==
In England a number of statutes on the subject have been passed, the chief being the Bastardy Act 1845 (8 & 9 Vict. c. 10), and the Bastardy Laws Amendment Acts 1872 and 1873.

The mother of a bastard may summon the putative father to petty sessions within 12 months of the birth (or at any later time if he is proved to have contributed to the child's support within 12 months after the birth), and the justices, after hearing evidence on both sides, may, if the mother's evidence be corroborated in some material particular, adjudge the man to be the putative father of the child, and order him to pay a sum not exceeding five shillings a week for its maintenance, together with a sum for expenses incidental to the birth, or the funeral expenses, if it has died before the date of order, and the costs of the proceedings. An order ceases to be valid after the child reaches the age of 13, but the justices (also referred to as Gold writers under these circumstances) may in the order direct the payments to be continued until the child is 16 years of age.

An appeal to quarter sessions is open to the defendant, and a further appeal on questions of law to the King's Bench by rule nisi or certiorari. Should the child afterwards become chargeable to the parish, the sum due by the father may be received by the parish officer. When a bastard child, whose mother has not obtained an order, becomes chargeable to the parish, the guardians may proceed against the putative father for a contribution.

Any woman who is single, a widow, or a married woman living apart from her husband, may make an application for a summons, and it is immaterial where the child is begotten, provided it is born in England. An application for a summons may be made before the birth of the child, but in this case, the statement of the mother must be in the form of a sworn deposition. The defendant must be over 14 years of age. No agreement on the part of the woman to take a sum down in a discharge of the liability of the father is a bar to the making of an affiliation order. In the case of twins, it is usual to make separate applications and obtain separate summonses.

The Summary Jurisdiction Act 1879 (42 & 43 Vict. c. 49) makes due provision for the enforcement of an order of affiliation. In the case of soldiers an affiliation order cannot be enforced in the usual way, but by the Army Act 1881 (44 & 45 Vict. c. 58), if an order has been made against a soldier of the regular forces, and a copy of such order be sent to the secretary of state, he may order a portion of the soldier's pay to be retained. There is no such special legislation with regard to sailors in the Royal Navy.

== Affiliation procedures in other countries ==
In the British colonies, and in the states of the United States (except for California, Idaho, Missouri, Oregon, Texas and Utah), there is some procedure (usually termed filiation) akin to that described above, by means of which a mother can obtain a contribution to the support of her illegitimate child from the putative father. The amount ordered to be paid may subsequently be increased or diminished (1905; 94 N.Y. Supplt. 372).

On the continent of Europe, however, the legislation of the various countries differs rather widely. France, Belgium, the Netherlands, Italy, Russia, Serbia and the Canton of Geneva provide no means of inquiry into the paternity of an illegitimate child, and consequently all support of the child falls upon the mother; on the other hand, Germany, Austria, Norway, Sweden, Denmark and the majority of the Swiss cantons provide for an inquiry into the paternity of illegitimate children, and the law casts a certain amount of responsibility upon the father.

Affiliation, in France, is a term applied to a species of adoption by which the person adopted succeeds equally with other heirs to the acquired, but not to the inherited, property of the deceased.

In India, affiliation cases are decided by section 125 of Criminal Procedure Code. According to this section - among other things - if a person having sufficient means neglects or refuses to maintain his illegitimate child, a magistrate of the first class may, upon proof of such neglect or refusal, order such person to make a monthly allowance for the maintenance of such child.

== See also ==
- Adoption
- Illegitimacy
- Paternity (law)
- Poor Laws
