= Bend (heraldry) =

Heraldic ordinary

Azure, a bend or, possibly the most famous bend in heraldic history, which was the subject of one of the earliest cases in heraldic law in England, Scrope v. Grosvenor (1389)

In heraldry, a bend is a band or strap running from the upper dexter (the bearer's right side and the viewer's left) corner of the shield to the lower sinister (the bearer's left side, and the viewer's right). Authorities differ as to how much of the field it should cover, ranging from one-fifth (if shown between other charges) up to one-third (if charged alone).

== Variations ==
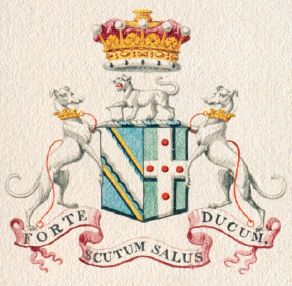
Heraldic achievement of Hugh Fortescue, 1st Earl Fortescue, showing arms of Fortescue impaling Grenville. Baron: Azure, a bend engrailled argent plain cottised or; Femme: Vert, on a cross argent five torteaux.

A bend can be modified by most of the lines of partition, such as the bend engrailed in the ancient arms of Fortescue and the bend wavy in the ancient coat of Wallop, Earls of Portsmouth.

=== Diminutives ===
The diminutives of the bend, being narrower versions, are as follows, in descending order of width:

- Bendlet: One-half as wide as a bend, as in the ancient arms of Churchill family, and the arms of Byron. A bendlet couped is also known as a baton, as in the coat of Elliot of Stobs (Note: Public Register volume 1, page 144.)
- Cotise: One-fourth the width of a bend; it usually appears in pairs, one on either side (French: coté) of a bend, in which case the bend is said to be cotised as in the ancient arms of Fortescue and Bohun and in the more modern arms of Hyndburn Borough Council, England. In ancient arms it can be found on only one side of a bend blazoned as a bend singly cotised.
- Riband or ribbon: Also one-fourth the width of a bend. It is also called a cost as in the arms of Abernethie of Auchincloch (Or, a lion rampant gules surmounted of a cost sable, all within a bordure engrailed azure — first and fourth quarters) (Note: Public Register volume 1, page 69)
- Scarp (or scarf): a bend sinister of one-half width.

== Bend sinister ==
Arthur Plantagenet, 1st Viscount Lisle (d.1542) bore the arms of the House of York with a bendlet sinister overall.

The usual bend is occasionally called a bend dexter when it needs to contrast with the bend sinister (Latin; means left), which runs in the other direction, like a sash worn diagonally from the left shoulder. The bend sinister and its diminutives such as the baton sinister are rare as an independent motif; they occur more often as marks of distinction. The term "bar sinister" is an erroneous term when used in this context, since the "bar" in heraldry refers to a horizontal line.

The bend sinister, reduced in size to that of a bendlet (narrow) or baton (ending short of the edge of the shield), was one of the commonest brisures (differences) added to the arms of illegitimate offspring of European aristocratic lords. Such royal descent was considered a mark of honour, and in most of Europe, illegitimate children of nobles, despite having few legal rights, were customarily regarded as noble and married within the most aristocratic families.

This was the usual mark used to identify illegitimate descendants of the English royal family dating from fifteenth century, as in the arms of Arthur Plantagenet, 1st Viscount Lisle, illegitimate son of Edward IV of England. It also appears in the arms of Antoine de Bourgogne, illegitimate son of Philip the Good, Duke of Burgundy. The full-sized bend sinister was seldom used in this way, and more recent examples also exist of bends sinister that have no connection with illegitimacy, such as in the arms of the Burne-Jones baronets. These markings were never subject to strict rules, and the customary English use of the bend, bendlet, and baton sinister to denote illegitimacy in this way eventually gave way to the use of different kinds of bordures.

George Bernard Shaw uses the term correctly in his play Saint Joan when Dunois, the bastard of Orleans, asks Joan "You see not the bend sinister" pointing to his shield.

=== "Bar sinister" ===
Sir Walter Scott is credited with inventing the phrase bar sinister, which has become a metonymic term for bastardy. Heraldry scholar Arthur Charles Fox-Davies and others state that the phrase derives from a misspelling of barre, the French term for bend sinister. The term is irregular, since in English heraldry a bar is horizontal, neither dexter nor sinister; nevertheless, bar sinister has become a standard euphemism for illegitimate birth.

== Similar elements ==
=== In bend ===
Arms of Northcote: Argent, three crosses-crosslet in bend sable

The phrase in bend refers to the appearance of several items on the shield being lined up in the direction of a bend, as in the arms of the ancient Northcote family of Devon: Argent, three crosses-crosslet in bend sable. It is also used when something is slanted in the direction of a bend, as in the coat of Surrey County Council in England.

=== Bendwise ===
A charge bendwise is slanted like a bend. When a charge is placed on a bend, by default it is shown bendwise.

=== Party per bend ===
Arms of Utrecht: Party per bend, argent and gules

A shield party per bend (or simply per bend) is divided into two parts by a single line which runs in the direction of a bend. Applies not only to the fields of shields but also to charges. A division in the opposite direction is called party per bend sinister.

=== Bendy ===
Arms of the first house of Burgundy: Bendy or and azure, a bordure gules

Bendy is a variation of the field consisting (usually) of an even number of parts, most often six; as in the coat of the duchy of Burgundy.

Analogous terms are derived from the bend sinister: per bend sinister, bendwise sinister, bendy sinister.

=== Engouled ===
In Spanish heraldry, bends may be engouled, or swallowed, by the heads of dragons or wolves. A famous example of this is in the Royal Bend of Castile.

== In national flags ==
=== Bend ===
Flag of Trinidad and Tobago
(bend enhanced)

Flag of Brunei
(bend reduced)

Flag of Uruguay, one of the three official

=== Party per bend ===
Flag of Papua New Guinea

=== Bend sinister ===
Flag of the Democratic Republic of the Congo
(bend reduced)

Flag of the Republic of the Congo
(bend enhanced)

Flag of Namibia

Flag of Saint Kitts and Nevis

Flag of Tanzania

==== Bendlet sinister ====
Flag of the Solomon Islands

=== Party per bend sinister ===
Flag of Bhutan
