= Misattributed paternity =

Misattributed paternity refers either to:

- A Non-paternity event, when someone who is presumed to be an individual's father is not the biological father
- Paternity fraud, a type of fraud which may occur in a non-paternal event
