= Anne Orthwood's bastard trial =

Anne Orthwood's bastard trial took place in 1663 in the then relatively new royal Colony of Virginia. Anne Orthwood was a 24-year-old maidservant when she became pregnant with her illegitimate twins. The father was the nephew of a powerful Virginian politician who felt that Orthwood's pregnancy would tarnish his family's reputation. Anne Orthwood died during childbirth, leaving behind her only surviving son, Jasper, with no one willing to claim him as their own. The four different cases that stem from the original trial of Anne Orthwood give a glimpse into the world of America in the seventeenth century as well as highlight the reasons legal systems are created in the first place.

== Background ==
Anne Orthwood was a 24-year-old indentured servant, who had emigrated from her home in Bristol, England to the Colony of Virginia in 1662. John Kendall was a bachelor in his early twenties from Norfolk, England. He lived with his uncle Colonel William Kendall, who was one of the most influential politicians in Virginia at the time. Anne Orthwood and John Kendall met at Colonel Kendall's Newport House Plantation. Colonel Kendall held Orthwood's indenture, so she worked as a servant woman in the plantation house, while John helped his uncle run the plantation.

John Kendall having a relationship of this nature with a low-born indentured servant such as Anne Orthwood would have been "unacceptable on moral and economic grounds". As a leader in the Virginian community, he "owed a duty to protect his fellow colonists form the damaging financial effects of illicit pregnancy". These financial stressors could include the pregnant indentured servant's inability to work and perform many tasks, such as field work or domestic chores. In addition to the loss of labor from an indenture, taxpayers resented illegitimate children born out of wedlock, fearing that the parents would not provide for them, thus the children having to be "fed, clothed, and sheltered at the public expense". Colonel John Kendall, being a member of the House of Burgesses as well as a church warden, would be seen as a leader in the "war against illegitimacy". With this context, Colonel Kendall would sell Orthwood's indenture to Lieutenant Colonel William Walters.

Colonel Kendall found out about Anne Orthwood and John Kendall's clandestine relationship, and grew worried about what would happen if someone else were to discover it as well. He thus sold his contractual rights to her services to one of his fellow Virginia plantation owners, Jacob Bishop. Northampton County, Virginia did not have a proper court house until 1665, so when official matters had to be discussed the councils would meet at Webbs Inn to hold their proceedings. As a result of the council meeting at Webbs Inn, Anne Orthwood and John Kendall were reunited on November 28, 1663. Anne Orthwood and John Kendall conceived twin boys during the weekend that the court proceedings took place, but John did not continue the relationship after that, nor did he acknowledge his paternity or otherwise help the pregnant Orthwood.

In order to shield herself from public shame and punishment, Orthwood hid her pregnancy as long as possible; however, her indenture was sold yet again to Lieutenant Colonel William Waters, a justice of the peace and plantation owner. When Orthwood's condition became known, she was arrested and interrogated. Orthwood, for reasons that were never explained, did not want to divulge the father's name. The county kept her in jail where she eventually went into labor, at which time she was denied the aid of a midwife until she revealed the father's name. After intense pain, she finally named John Kendall as the twins' father. Orthwood and one of her twin sons died during childbirth; the other twin son, Jasper Orthwood, survived.

Four distinct cases stemmed from Orthwood's original act of fornication:

- Waters v. Bishop, in which Waters sued Bishop for selling him damaged goods, as Orthwood's pregnancy left her unable to work, thus making her indenture useless;
- Ex Parte Kendall, a suit against John Kendall for civil liability for child support for the surviving twin;
- Rex v. Kendall, a criminal fornication charge lodged against John by the Northampton County grand jury;
- Orthwood v. Warren, in which Jasper Orthwood at the age of 21 sued his then-master John Warren for his freedom after Warren initially refused to grant it.

== Waters v. Bishopp ==
When Jacob Bishop sold Anne Orthwood's indenture to Lieutenant Colonel William Waters, he had assured Waters that as far as he knew Orthwood was in perfect health and still a virgin. At some point between April and June 1664, Waters became aware of Orthwood's pregnancy, at which point he tried to cancel the sale and recover his down payment (the amount of which was never specified). Bishop refused to take Orthwood back and return Waters' down payment, stating that the contract was valid and Waters had no legal obligation to support her. Waters believed that the contract was voidable because Bishop had provided a false description of Orthwood's physical condition, since it was impossible for Orthwood to have not been pregnant at the time of the sale.

Under English law (which was generally used in the colonies at that time), if a servant became pregnant before a master hired her, he was able to fire her from his household, but if she had conceived the child during her time in the new master's house, then the master had to continue to provide the necessities of life and was not permitted to turn her out. So in order to "fix" his bad purchase of Orthwood's indenture, Waters had to convince a panel of five judges (his colleagues as he was also a justice of the peace) that he was not obligated to care for her as she did not become pregnant during her stay in his home, and sue Bishop for the return for his down payment.

Before the case could go to trial, Bishop asked for a stay of the trial as he had business out of town. While Bishop was away, Orthwood gave birth to her surviving son Jasper Orthwood, and subsequently died due to complications. As a result, Waters no longer needed to put forth to the panel of judges his request to turn Orthwood out of his home. He still however sued Bishop for his down payment and the costs for the suit. The county court ruled in Waters' favor, saying it was a breach of contract when Bishop misdescribed the condition of his maidservant. It was ruled that Bishop must pay back Waters' full down payment and his suit costs.

== Ex Parte Kendall ==
This was a civil liability charge brought against John Kendall. It came before the Northampton County Court on August 29, 1664. The magistrate concluded that the case had two distinct issues; one being whether or not John was liable for Jasper's support and the other was a moral question of whether or not John had actually had extramarital sex with Orthwood. The courts ruled that even though the timing of Orthwood's pregnancy indicated that John was not in fact Jasper's biological father, he was still responsible for providing for Jasper until the time that Jasper could be bound into servitude.

When deciding his moral guilt, however, the magistrate found John to be innocent of having extramarital sex with Orthwood. When asked about his ruling, the magistrate said he ruled in John's best future interests in order to salvage his reputation. However, many believe that the magistrate ruled John responsible financially for Jasper in order to keep the financial burden of his well-being from being pushed on the local taxpayers. When a child was abandoned for any reason in the seventeenth century, his living expenses were considered "chargeable to the parish", meaning that the child would have to be clothed, fed, and sheltered at the local public's expense.

== Rex v. Kendall ==
This was a criminal fornication charge brought against John Kendall. The decision was already determined by the Ex Parte Kendall civil liability case, but the formality of a trial was maintained. Kendall was found not guilty, on the basis that the time from the date that Orthwood conceived to the day she gave birth was only seven months. In the seventeenth century, there was very little medical knowledge regarding the usual circumstances of twin births, including the fact that twins are often born prematurely. Orthwood's credibility in naming Kendall as the father was considered doubtful, because she only revealed the name under interrogation and in pain during labor.

== Orthwood v. Warren ==
Anne Orthwood's son, Jasper Orthwood, was bound into servitude as an infant by the parish. John Kendall did not take Jasper into his own home, but instead left him to the parish and made payments for the costs associated with his care. When Jasper turned 21, he requested to be released from his servitude. His then-master John Warren, another wealthy landowner, refused his request citing the English Poor Relief Act 1601 which stated that churchwardens may bind male bastards into servitude until the age of 24.

In response to his master's refusal, Jasper hired a lawyer and sued Warren for his freedom in the Northampton County Court. Jasper's defense relied on the 1672 act of the Virginia Assembly, which stated male bastards could only be bound until the age of 21. This raised the question not only of whether or not Jasper was eligible to be freed, but also what laws were to be held supreme in the colonies; English laws of a government thousands of miles away or laws made by colony assemblies where they could be fit to the circumstances. In this particular case, the colony law ruled supreme and Jasper walked out of the courtroom a free man. This was not unusual, for more and more colonies were finding it hard to rule according to English law.

== Importance ==
Anne Orthwood's bastard trial and the resulting four trials give a glimpse into the function of law in the seventeenth-century colonies. This time in American history was a period of transition. There was a unique mix of English, colony, and unwritten laws governing the people. Which laws the court would choose, rule by, or ignore was based on how the people in the community felt about the case being prosecuted.

Cases like Anne and Jasper Orthwood's were fairly common in the seventeenth century; what was uncommon was the variety of cases springing from them: breach of contract, acts of criminal conduct, and a paternity suit giving the observer a clear view on how the court acted with each different case.

With criminal conduct cases, the court acted upon moral justification rather than law. In paternity cases, they acted upon the community's best financial interests, finding a responsible party to take the burden off themselves. In the paternity case, they let John Kendall's uncle persuade them into ruling him not guilty of being the boy's father in order to save his future prospects.
