= MR and DR v An t-Ard-Chláraitheoir =

Supreme Court of Ireland case

- Coat of arms of Ireland
- Court: Supreme Court of Ireland
- Full case name: MR and DR v An t-Ard-Chláraitheoir [2014] IESC 60
- Decided: 7 November 2014
- Citation: https://ie.vlex.com/vid/r-v-an-tard-793962893 https://www.bailii.org/ie/cases/IESC/2014/S60.html#judge1

Case history
- Appealed from: The High Court
- Appealed to: The Supreme Court

Court membership
- Judges sitting: Denham C.J., Murray J., Hardiman J., O'Donnell Donal J., McKechnie J., Clarke J., MacMenamin J.

Case opinions
- The Court decided that only the birth mother can be on the birth certificate due to the Civil Registration Act of 2004. It was decided that the name of the birth mother, not the mother who will raise the child, will be on the birth certificate of a child born through surrogacy.
- Decision by: Denham C.J.

Keywords
- Surrogacy Supreme Court of Ireland Legislation Ireland Family Law

MR and DR v An t-Ard-Chláraitheoir [2014] IESC 60, [2014] 3 IR 533 is a reported Irish Supreme Court case decision. The Court held that the Civil Registration Act 2004 only allows the birth mother to be on the birth certificate. It was decided that children born through surrogacy will have the name of their birth mother on their birth certificate and not the mother who is going to raise them.

== Background ==
R wanted her name to be on the birth certificate of the twins L carried to term for her by surrogacy. The registrar would not let this happen. R then went to the High Court to get an order from the court telling the registrar to change the birth certificate. R argued in the High Court that section 37 of the Status of Children Act meant that a person's genes decide whether or not they can be a mother. The registrar's case was based on a legal principle called "mater semper certa est," which means "the mother is certain" This is the idea that the mother of a child is the woman who gave birth to that child. The High Court sided with R, and the registrar filed an appeal.

== Holding of the Supreme Court ==
The Court allowed the appeal, meaning that only birth mothers could be on the birth certificate. Denham CJ, allowing the appeal said that there is no definition of mother in the Irish Constitution, however there is also no prohibition on legislating surrogacy. Laws on surrogacy would affect the rights of children and their genetic parents. It would create complex relationships and it is beyond the means of the court to make a precedent for surrogacy rights. Laws on surrogacy should be dealt with in the Oireachtas.

=== Concurrences ===
==== O'Donnell J ====
The current legal position was fair because it made sense to say that the birth mother was the mother on the birth certificate. He went on to say that there might be legal issues if the birth mother was still listed as the mother after the baby was born. When the system doesn't regulate assisted reproduction, it doesn't recognize the existence of the genetic mother, which is important for the financial and personal life of the child's family.

He did, however, say that there is a gap in the law when it comes to surrogacy. He commented on the fact that, generations of children have been born in Ireland through assisted reproduction in a legal gray area where the only limits are the rules of the private market and the practitioners' sense of responsibility.

===== McKechnie J =====
R deserved to be acknowledged as the mother, but the law did not permit this. The Oireachtas is tasked with writing the laws, and the courts are tasked with applying the law.

==== Hardiman J ====
The need for surrogacy legislation was discussed in his opinion. The failure to enact new legislation in the field of assisted reproductive technology is significant because it has an intimate and personal effect on them (mothers and children), which makes law reform in this area necessary.

==== McMenamin J ====
In his ruling, McMenamin J pointed out that because science is always changing, the Legislature must keep up with new developments.

=== Dissent ===
==== Clarke J ====
In his opinion, the infant possessed traits from both the birth mother and the genetic mother. Without prejudicing the birth mother, he would have declared that R is the mother.

== Subsequent developments ==
According to Emily Logan, Chief Commissioner of the Irish Human Rights and Equality Commission, the issues this case raised highlights critical concerns of human rights and equality relating to assisted human reproduction that has a legal void in Ireland.

The Children and Family Relationships Act was enacted in 2015. Surrogacy was not included but assisted human reproduction was.

The Oireachtas introduced a Bill on assisted human reproduction in 2017. This Bill would be Ireland's first piece of legislation to regulate surrogacy in Ireland.
