= Legitimacy (family law) =

Legal status of a child born to parents who are legally married

Share of births outside marriage

In traditional Western common law, legitimacy is the status of a child born to parents who are legally married to each other, and of a child conceived before the parents obtain a legal divorce. Conversely, illegitimacy, also known as bastardy, has been the status of a child born outside marriage, such a child being known as a bastard, a love child, a natural child, or illegitimate. In Scots law, the terms natural son and natural daughter carry the same implications.

The importance of legitimacy has decreased substantially in Western countries since the sexual revolution of the 1960s and 1970s and the declining influence of Christian churches in family and social life. A 2009 report from the Centers for Disease Control and Prevention indicated that in 2007 a substantial proportion of births in Western countries occurred outside marriage.

== Law ==
England's Statute of Merton (1235) stated, regarding illegitimacy: "He is a bastard that is born before the marriage of his parents." This definition also applied to situations when a child's parents could not marry, as when one or both were already married or when the relationship was incestuous.

The Poor Act 1575 formed the basis of English bastardy law. Its purpose was to punish a bastard child's mother and putative father, and to relieve the parish from the cost of supporting mother and child. "By an act of 1576 (18 Elizabeth C. 3), it was ordered that bastards should be supported by their putative fathers, though bastardy orders in the quarter sessions date from before this date. If the genitor could be found, then he was put under very great pressure to accept responsibility and to maintain the child."

Under English law, a bastard could not inherit real property and could not be legitimized by the subsequent marriage of father to mother. There was one exception: when his father subsequently married his mother, and an older illegitimate son (a "bastard eigné") took possession of his father's lands after his death, he would pass the land on to his own heirs on his death, as if his possession of the land had been retroactively converted into true ownership. A younger non-bastard brother (a "mulier puisnè") would have no claim to the land.

There were many "natural children" of Scotland's monarchy granted positions which founded prominent families. In the 14th century, Robert II of Scotland gifted one of his illegitimate sons estates in Bute, founding the Stewarts of Bute, and similarly a natural son of Robert III of Scotland was ancestral to the Shaw Stewarts of Greenock.

In Scots law an illegitimate child, a "natural son" or "natural daughter", would be legitimated by the subsequent marriage of his parents, provided they had been free to marry at the date of the conception. The Legitimation (Scotland) Act 1968 extended legitimation by the subsequent marriage of the parents to children conceived when their parents were not free to marry, but this was repealed in 2006 by the amendment of section 1 of the Law Reform (Parent and Child) (Scotland) Act 1986 (as amended in 2006) which abolished the status of illegitimacy stating that "(1) No person whose status is governed by Scots law shall be illegitimate ...".

The Legitimacy Act 1926 of England and Wales legitimised the birth of a child if the parents subsequently married each other, provided that they had not been married to someone else in the meantime. The Legitimacy Act 1959 extended the legitimisation even if the parents had married others in the meantime and applied it to putative marriages which the parents incorrectly believed were valid. Neither the 1926 nor 1959 Acts changed the laws of succession to the British throne and succession to peerage and baronetcy titles. In Scotland children legitimated by the subsequent marriage of their parents have always been entitled to succeed to peerages and baronetcies and the Legitimation (Scotland) Act 1968 extended this right to children conceived when their parents were not free to marry. The Family Law Reform Act 1969 (c. 46) allowed an illegitimate child to inherit on the intestacy of his parents. In canon and in civil law, the offspring of putative marriages have also been considered legitimate.

Since December 2003 in England and Wales, April 2002 in Northern Ireland and May 2006 in Scotland, an unmarried father has parental responsibility if he is listed on the birth certificate.

In the United States, in the early 1970s a series of Supreme Court decisions held that most common-law disabilities imposed upon illegitimacy were invalid as violations of the Equal Protection Clause of the Fourteenth Amendment to the United States Constitution. Still, children born out of wedlock may not be eligible for certain federal benefits (e.g., automatic naturalization when the father becomes a US citizen) unless the child has been legitimized in the appropriate jurisdiction.

Many other countries have legislatively abolished any legal disabilities of a child born out of wedlock.

In France, legal reforms regarding illegitimacy began in the 1970s, but it was only in the 21st century that the principle of equality was fully upheld (through Act no. 2002-305 of 4 March 2002, removing mention of "illegitimacy" — filiation légitime and filiation naturelle; and through law no. 2009-61 of 16 January 2009). In 2001, France was forced by the European Court of Human Rights to change several laws that were deemed discriminatory, and in 2013 the Court ruled that these changes must also be applied to children born before 2001.

In some countries, family law explicitly states that there must be equality between children born outside and inside marriage. For example, Bulgaria's Constitution decrees that children born outside marriage have the same rights as those born inside marriage.

The European Convention on the Legal Status of Children Born out of Wedlock came into force in 1978. Countries which ratify it must ensure that children born outside marriage are provided with legal rights as stipulated in the text of this convention. The convention was ratified by the UK in 1981 and by Ireland in 1988.

In later years, the inheritance rights of many illegitimate children have improved, and changes of laws have allowed them to inherit properties. More recently, the laws of England have been changed to allow illegitimate children to inherit entailed property, over their legitimate brothers and sisters.

== Contemporary situation ==
Despite the decreasing legal relevance of illegitimacy, an important exception may be found in the nationality laws of many countries, which do not apply jus sanguinis (nationality by citizenship of a parent) to children born out of wedlock, particularly in cases where the child's connection to the country lies only through the father. This is true, for example, of the United States, and its constitutionality was upheld in 2001 by the Supreme Court in Nguyen v. INS. In the UK, the policy was changed so that children born after 1 July 2006 could receive British citizenship from their father if their parents were unmarried at the time of the child's birth; illegitimate children born before this date cannot receive British citizenship through their father.

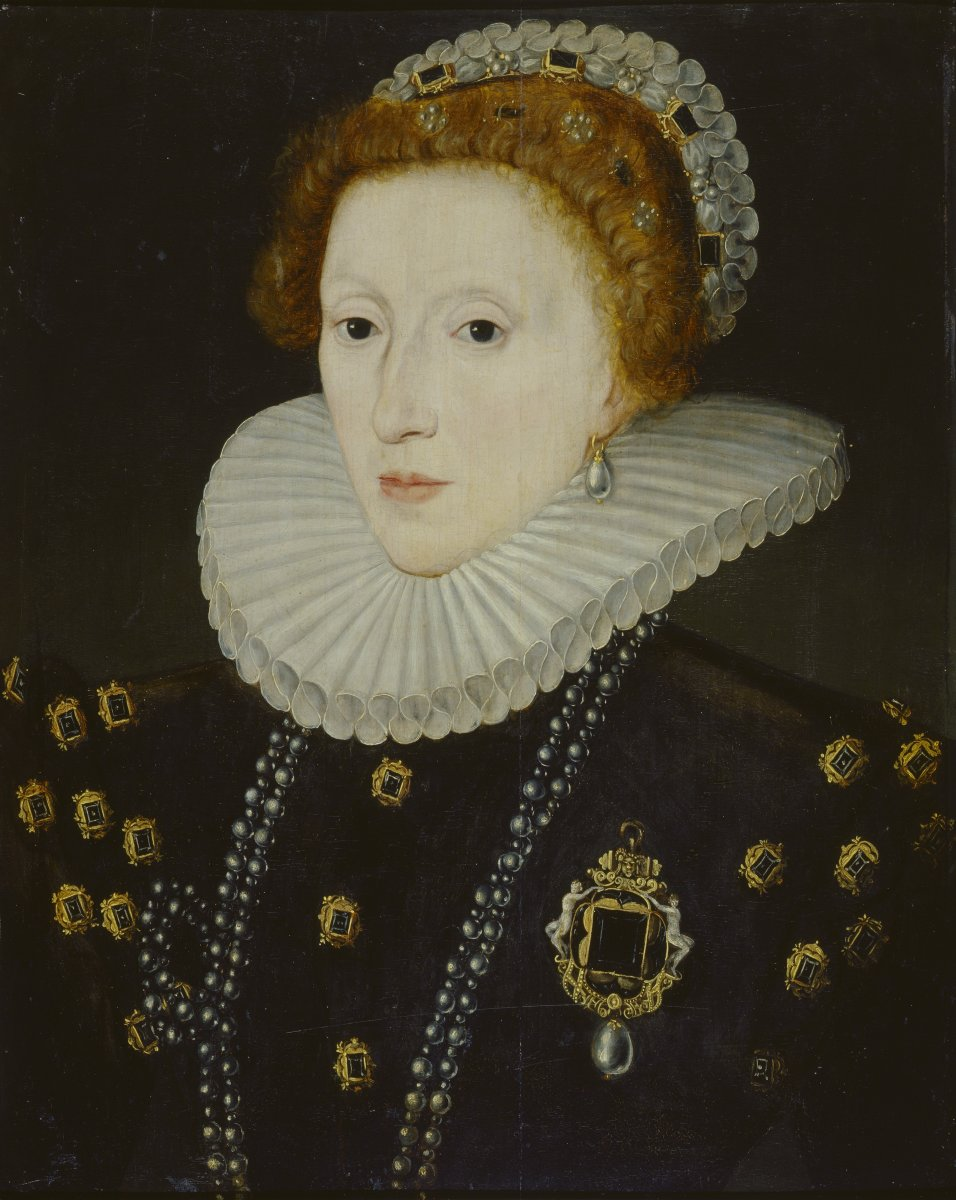
Elizabeth I

Legitimacy also continues to be relevant to hereditary titles, with only legitimate children being admitted to the line of succession. Some monarchs, however, have succeeded to the throne despite the controversial status of their legitimacy. For example, Elizabeth I succeeded to the throne though she was legally held illegitimate as a result of her parents' marriage having been annulled after her birth. Her older half-sister Mary I had acceded to the throne before her in a similar circumstance: her parents' marriage had been annulled in order to allow her father to marry Elizabeth's mother.

Annulment of marriage does not currently change the status of legitimacy of children born to the couple during their putative marriage, i.e., between their marriage ceremony and the legal annulment of their marriage. For example, canon 1137 of the Roman Catholic Church's Code of Canon Law specifically affirms the legitimacy of a child born to a marriage that is declared null following the child's birth.

As of 1983, illegitimate children no longer need special dispensations to become priests in the Catholic Church.

The Catholic Church never held illegitimacy as an obstacle to baptism, even infant baptism. This stance was re affirmed by Pope Francis when he argued that the mothers had done the right thing by giving life to the child and should not be shunned by the church:

In our ecclesiastical region there are priests who don't baptise the children of single mothers because they weren't conceived in the sanctity of marriage. These are today's hypocrites. Those who clericalise the church. Those who separate the people of God from salvation. And this poor girl who, rather than returning the child to sender, had the courage to carry it into the world, must wander from parish to parish so that it's baptised!

== Nonmarital births ==
Percentage of births to unmarried women, selected countries, 1980 and 2007

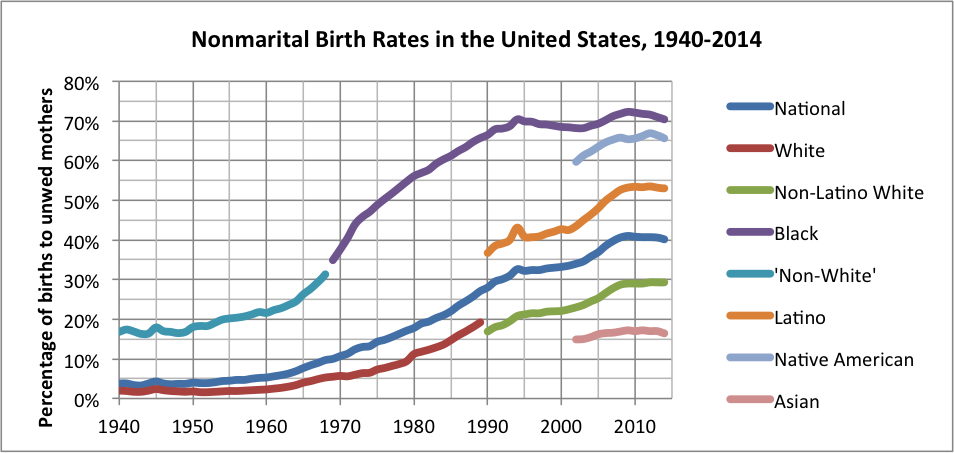
Nonmarital birth rates by race in the United States from 1940 to 2014. Data are from the National Vital Statistics System Reports published by the CDC National Center for Health Statistics. Note: Before 1969, the rates for all minority groups were consolidated in the category of "Non-White."

The proportion of children born outside marriage has been rising since the turn of the 21st century in most European Union countries, North America, and Australia. In Europe, besides the low levels of fertility rates and the delay of motherhood, another factor that now characterizes fertility is the growing percentage of births outside marriage. In the EU, this phenomenon has been on the rise in recent years in almost every country; and in eight EU countries, mostly in northern Europe, as well as in Iceland outside of the EU, it already accounts for the majority of births.

In 2009, 41% of children born in the United States were born to unmarried mothers, a significant increase from the 5% of half a century earlier. That includes 73% of non-Hispanic black children, 53% of Hispanic children (of all races), and 29% of non-Hispanic white children. In 2020, the proportion was almost similar, with 40.5% of children born in the United States being born to unmarried mothers.

In April 2009, the National Center for Health Statistics announced that nearly 40 percent of American infants born in 2007 were born to an unwed mother; that of 4.3 million children, 1.7 million were born to unmarried parents, a 25 percent increase from 2002. Most births to teenagers in the United States (86% in 2007) are nonmarital; in 2007, 60% of births to women 20–24, and nearly one-third of births to women 25–29, were nonmarital. In 2007, teenagers accounted for just 23% of non-marital births, down steeply from 50% in 1970.

In 2014, 42% of all births in the 28 EU countries were nonmarital. The percentage was also 42% in 2018. In 2018, births outside of marriage represented the majority of births in eight EU member states: France (60%), Bulgaria (59%), Slovenia (58%), Portugal (56%), Sweden (55%), Denmark and Estonia (both 54%), and the Netherlands (52%). The lowest percentage were in Greece, Cyprus, Croatia, Poland and Lithuania, with a percentage of under 30%.

To a certain degree, religion (the religiosity of the population - see religion in Europe) correlates with the proportion of non-marital births (e.g., Greece, Cyprus, Croatia have a low percentage of births outside marriage), but this is not always the case: Portugal (56% in 2018) is among the most religious countries in Europe.

The proportion of non-marital births is also approaching half in the Czech Republic (48.5%. in 2021), the United Kingdom (48.2% as of 2017) and Hungary (46.7% as of 2016).

The prevalence of births to unmarried women varies not only between different countries, but also between different geographical areas of the same country: for example, in Germany, there are very strong differences between the regions of former West Germany and East Germany with a non-religious majority. Significantly more children are born out of wedlock in eastern Germany than in western Germany. In 2012, in eastern Germany 61.6% of births were to unmarried women, while in western Germany only 28.4% were. In the UK, in 2014, 59.4% of births were non-marital in North East of England, 58.9% in Wales, 54.2% in North West England, 52.4% in Yorkshire and the Humber, 52% in East Midlands, 50.8% in Scotland, 50.4% in West Midlands, 48.5% in South West England, 45.5% in East of England, 43.2% in Northern Ireland, 42.9% in South East England, and 35.7% in London.

In France, in 2012, 66.9% of births were non-marital in Poitou-Charentes, while only 46.6% were in Ile-de-France (which contains Paris). One of the reasons for the lower prevalence of non-marital births in the metropolis is the high number of immigrants from conservative world regions. In Canada, in Quebec, the majority of births since 1995 onwards have been outside marriage. As of 2015, 63% of births were outside marriage in Quebec.

Traditionally conservative Catholic countries in the EU now also have substantial proportions of non-marital births, as of 2016 (except where otherwise stated): Portugal (52.8%), Spain (45.9%), Austria (41.7%), Luxembourg (40.7%) Slovakia (40.2%), Ireland (36.5%), Malta (31.8%)

The percentage of first-born children born out of wedlock is considerably higher (by roughly 10%, for the EU), as marriage often takes place after the first baby has arrived. For example, for the Czech Republic, whereas the total nonmarital births are less than half, 47.7%, (third quarter of 2015) the percentage of first-born outside marriage is more than half, 58.2%.

In Australia, in 1971, only 7% of births were outside of marriage, compared to 36% in 2020. The proportion of births outside of marriage was the highest in the Northern Territory (59%) and the lowest in the ACT (28%).

Latin America has the highest rates of non-marital childbearing in the world (55–74% of all children in this region are born to unmarried parents). In most countries in this traditionally Catholic region, children born outside marriage are now the norm. Recent figures from Latin America show non-marital births to be 74% in Colombia, 70% in Paraguay, 69% in Peru, 63% in the Dominican Republic, 58% in Argentina, 55% in Mexico. In Brazil, non-marital births increased to 65.8% in 2009, up from 56.2% in 2000. In Chile, non-marital births increased to 70.7% in 2013, up from 48.3% in 2000.

Even in the early 1990s, the phenomenon was very common in Latin America. For example, in 1993, out-of-wedlock births in Mexico were 41.5%, in Chile 43.6%, in Puerto Rico 45.8%, in Costa Rica 48.2%, in Argentina 52.7%, in Belize 58.1%, in El Salvador 73%, in Suriname 66%, and in Panama 80%.

Out-of-wedlock births are less common in Asia: in 1993 the rate in Japan was 1.4%; in Israel, 3.1%; in China, 5.6%; in Uzbekistan, 6.4%; in Kazakhstan, 21%; and in Kyrgyzstan, 24%. However, in the Philippines (a former Spanish colony, like much of Latin America), the out-of-wedlock birth rate was 37% in 2008–2009, rising dramatically to 52.1% by 2015.

== Covert illegitimacy ==
Covert illegitimacy is a situation which arises when someone who is presumed to be a child's father (or mother) is in fact not the biological father (or mother). Frequencies as high as 30% are sometimes assumed in the media, but research by sociologist Michael Gilding traced these overestimates back to an informal remark at a 1972 conference.

The detection of unsuspected illegitimacy can occur in the context of medical genetic screening, in genetic family name research, and in immigration testing. Such studies show that covert illegitimacy is in fact less than 10% among the sampled African populations, less than 5% among the sampled Native American and Polynesian populations, less than 2% of the sampled Middle Eastern population, and generally 1%–2% among European samples.

== Causes for rise in nonmarital births ==
The rise in illegitimacy noted in Britain throughout the eighteenth century has been associated with the rise of new employment opportunities for women, making them less dependent upon a husband's earnings. However, the Marriage Act 1753 sought to curb this practice, by combining the spousals and nuptials; and by the start of the 19th century, social convention prescribed that brides be virgins at marriage, and illegitimacy became more socially discouraged, especially during the Victorian era. Later in the 20th century, the social changes of the 1960s and 1970s were alleged to have started to reverse this trend, with an increase in cohabitation and alternative family formation during this period in time. However, contrary to popular belief, the common presumption that there was far less out-of-wedlock sex in the United States between 1940 and 1960 than in later years was acknowledged to be a myth by 2005. U.S. Census Bureau statistics collected by University of Florida history professor Alan Petigny showed that single motherhood among even white women in fact increased from 3.6 to 9.2 newborns per 1,000 unmarried out-of-wedlock pregnancies during this period in time. Single motherhood among all women also rose form 7.1 to 21.6 newborns per 1,000 unwed women from 1940 to 1960 as well. Elsewhere in Europe and Latin America, the increase in nonmarital births from the late 20th century on has been linked to secularization, enhanced women's rights and standing in society, and the fall of authoritarian dictatorships.

Before the dissolution of Marxist–Leninist regimes in Europe, women's participation in the workforce was actively encouraged by most governments, but socially conservative regimes such as that of Nicolae Ceausescu practiced restrictive and natalist policies regarding family reproduction, such as total bans on contraception and abortion, and birth rates were tightly controlled by the state. After the dissolution of those regimes, the population was given more choices on how to organize their personal lives, and in regions such as former East Germany, the rate of births outside marriage increased dramatically: as of 2012, 61.6% of births there were outside marriage. Far-right regimes such as those of Francoist Spain and Portugal's Estado Novo also fell, leading to the democratization and liberalization of society. In Spain and Portugal, important legal changes throughout the 1970s and 1980s included legalization of divorce, decriminalization of adultery, introduction of gender equality in family law, and removal of the ban on contraception.

In many countries there has been a dissociation between marriage and fertility, with the two no longer being closely associated—with births to unmarried couples, as well as childless married couples, becoming more common and more socially acceptable. Contributions to these societal changes have been made by the weakening of social and legal norms that regulate peoples' personal lives and relations, especially in regard to marriage, secularization and decreased church control of reproduction, increased participation of women in the labor force, changes in the meaning of marriage, risk reduction, individualism, changing views on female sexuality, and availability of contraception. New concepts have emerged, such as that of reproductive rights, though these concepts have not been accepted by all cultures. Under the notions of reproductive and sexual rights, individuals—not the state, church, community, etc.—shall decide whether and when individuals shall have children, their number and spacing, the circumstances under which individuals will or will not be sexually active, and their choice of intimate partners and type of relationship.

It is argued that in some places where the control of the church (especially the Roman Catholic Church) was traditionally very strong, the social changes of the 1960s and 1970s have led to a negative reaction of the population against the lifestyles promoted by the church. One of the explanations of the current high rates of unmarried cohabitation in Quebec is that the traditionally strong social control of the church and the Catholic doctrine over people's private relations and sexual morality has led the population to rebel against traditional and conservative social values; since 1995 the majority of births in this province are outside marriage, and as of 2015, in Quebec, 63% of children were born to unmarried women. The past few decades have seen decreased marriage rates in most Western countries, and this decrease has been accompanied by increased emergence of non-traditional family forms. Average marriage rates across OECD countries have fallen from 8.1 marriages per 1,000 people in 1970 to 5.0 in 2009.

Research on the situation in Bulgaria has concluded that:

[The rise in unmarried cohabitation] shows that for many people it is not of great importance [whether] their union is a legal marriage or [a] consensual union. This [indicates] clear changes in [people's] value orientations [...] and less social pressure for marriage.

== History ==
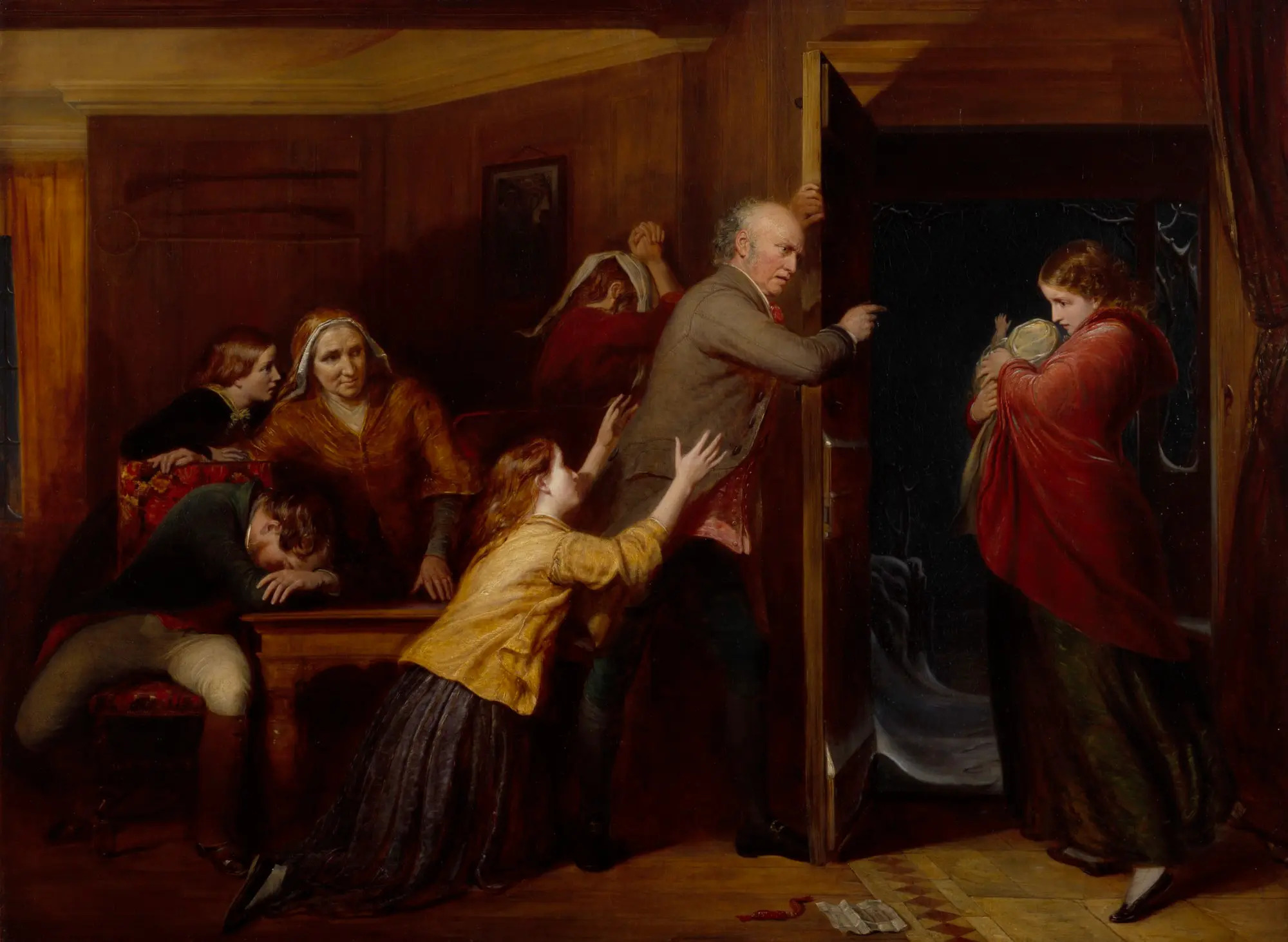
The Outcast, by Richard Redgrave, 1851. A patriarch casts his daughter and her illegitimate baby out of the family home.

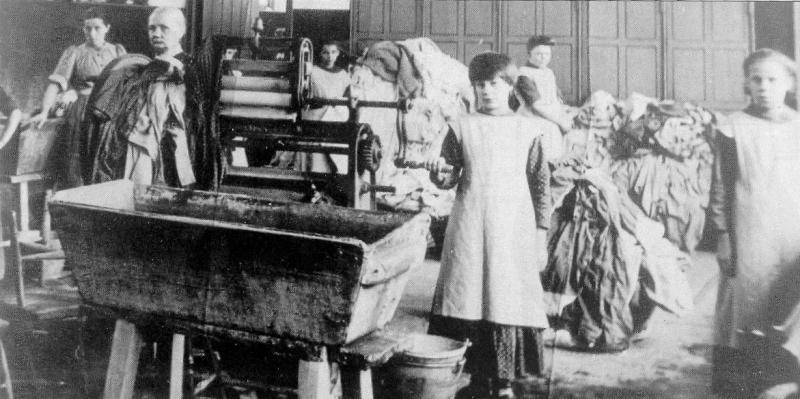
Magdalene laundries were institutions that existed from the 18th to the late 20th centuries, throughout Europe and North America, where "fallen women", including unmarried mothers, were detained. Photo: Magdalene laundry in Ireland, ca. early twentieth century.

Certainty of paternity has been considered important in a wide range of eras and cultures, especially when inheritance and citizenship were at stake, making the tracking of a man's estate and genealogy a central part of what defined a "legitimate" birth. The ancient Latin dictum, "Mater semper certa est" ("The [identity of the] mother is always certain", while the father is not), emphasized the dilemma.

In Italy during the Renaissance, a sharp distinction was made between two kinds of illegitimate children: a natural child, both of whose parents were unmarried, and a spurious child, at least one of whose parents was married, but not to the other parent. Natural children were commonly recognized as heirs, with little shame attached, while spurious children were generally looked down upon. The higher the status of the family, the less the stigma mattered. For example, Cesare Borgia, a spurious child of Rodrigo Borgia (later Pope Alexander VI), was legitimized by a papal decree. His father the Pope made him a Cardinal at the age of 18.

In English common law, Justice Edward Coke in 1626 promulgated the "Four Seas Rule" (extra quatuor maria) asserting that, absent impossibility of the father being fertile, there was a presumption of paternity that a married woman's child was her husband's child. That presumption could be questioned, though courts generally sided with the presumption, thus expanding the range of the presumption to a "Seven Seas Rule". But it was only with the Marriage Act 1753 that a formal and public marriage ceremony at civil law was required, whereas previously marriage had a safe haven if celebrated in an Anglican church. Still, many "clandestine" marriages occurred.

In many societies, people born out of wedlock did not have the same rights of inheritance as those within it, and in some societies, even the same civil rights. In the United Kingdom and the United States, as late as the 1960s and in certain social strata even up to today, nonmarital birth has carried a social stigma. In previous centuries unwed mothers were socially pressured to give their children up for adoption. In other cases nonmarital children have been reared by grandparents or married relatives as the "sisters", "brothers" or "cousins" of the unwed mothers.

In most national jurisdictions, the status of a child as a legitimate or illegitimate heir could be changed—in either direction—under the civil law: A legislative act could deprive a child of legitimacy; conversely, a marriage between the previously unmarried parents, usually within a specified time, such as a year, could retroactively legitimate a child's birth.

Fathers of illegitimate children often did not incur comparable censure or legal responsibility, due to social attitudes about sex, the nature of sexual reproduction, and the difficulty of determining paternity with certainty.

By the final third of the 20th century, in the United States, all the states had adopted uniform laws that codified the responsibility of both parents to provide support and care for a child, regardless of the parents' marital status, and gave non-marital as well as adopted persons equal rights to inherit their parents' property. In the early 1970s, a series of Supreme Court decisions abolished most, if not all, of the common-law disabilities of non-marital birth, as being violations of the equal-protection clause of the Fourteenth Amendment to the United States Constitution. Generally speaking, in the United States, "illegitimate" has been supplanted by the phrase "born out of wedlock."

In contrast, other jurisdictions (particularly western continental European countries) tend to favour social parentage over the biological parentage. Here a man (not necessarily the biological father) may voluntarily recognise the child to be identified as the father, thus giving legitimacy to the child; the biological father does not have any special rights in this area. In France, a mother may refuse to recognize her own child (see anonymous birth).

A contribution to the decline of the concept of illegitimacy had been made by increased ease of obtaining divorce. Before this, the mother and father of many children had been unable to marry each other because one or the other was already legally bound, by civil or canon law, in a non-viable earlier marriage that did not permit divorce. Their only recourse, often, had been to wait for the death of the earlier spouse(s). Thus Polish political and military leader Józef Piłsudski (1867–1935) was unable to marry his second wife, Aleksandra, until his first wife, Maria, died in 1921; by this time, Piłsudski and Aleksandra had two out-of-wedlock daughters.

== Social implications ==
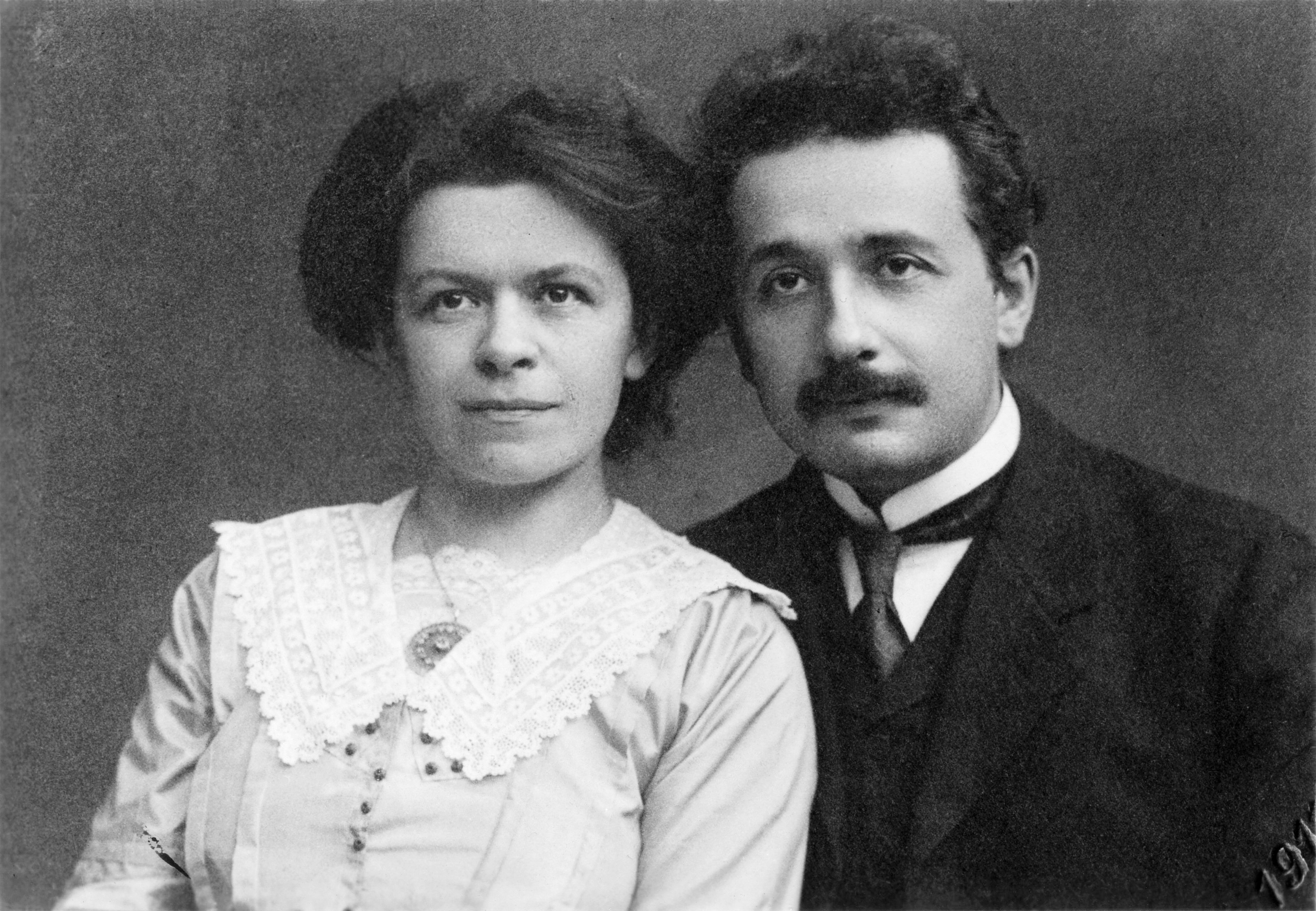
Mileva Marić and Albert Einstein, 1912

Nonmarital birth has affected not only the individuals themselves. The stress that such circumstances of birth once regularly visited upon families is illustrated in the case of Albert Einstein and his wife-to-be, Mileva Marić, who—when she became pregnant with the first of their three children, Lieserl—felt compelled to maintain separate domiciles in different cities.

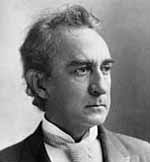
Edwin Booth

Some persons born outside of marriage have been driven to excel in their endeavors, for good or ill, by a desire to overcome the social stigma and disadvantage that attached to it. Nora Titone, in her book My Thoughts Be Bloody, recounts how the shame and ambition of actor Junius Brutus Booth's two actor sons born outside of marriage, Edwin Booth and John Wilkes Booth, spurred them to strive, as rivals, for achievement and acclaim—John Wilkes, the assassin of Abraham Lincoln, and Edwin, a Unionist who a year earlier had saved the life of Lincoln's son, Robert Todd Lincoln, in a railroad accident.

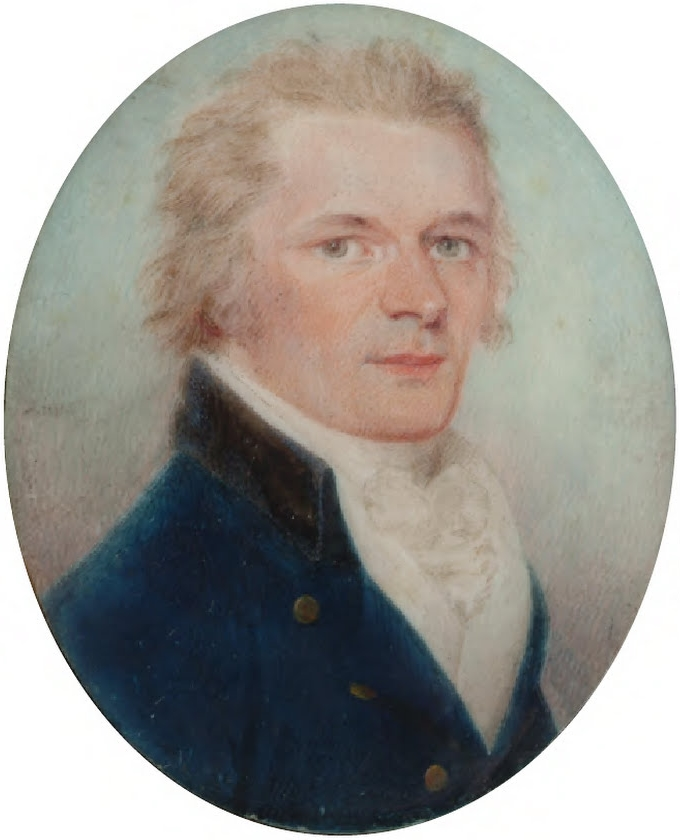
Alexander Hamilton, 1790

Historian John Ferling, in his book Jefferson and Hamilton: The Rivalry That Forged a Nation, makes the same point: that Alexander Hamilton's non-marital birth spurred him to seek accomplishment and distinction. The Swedish artist Anders Zorn (1860–1920) was similarly motivated by his non-marital birth to prove himself and excel in his métier.

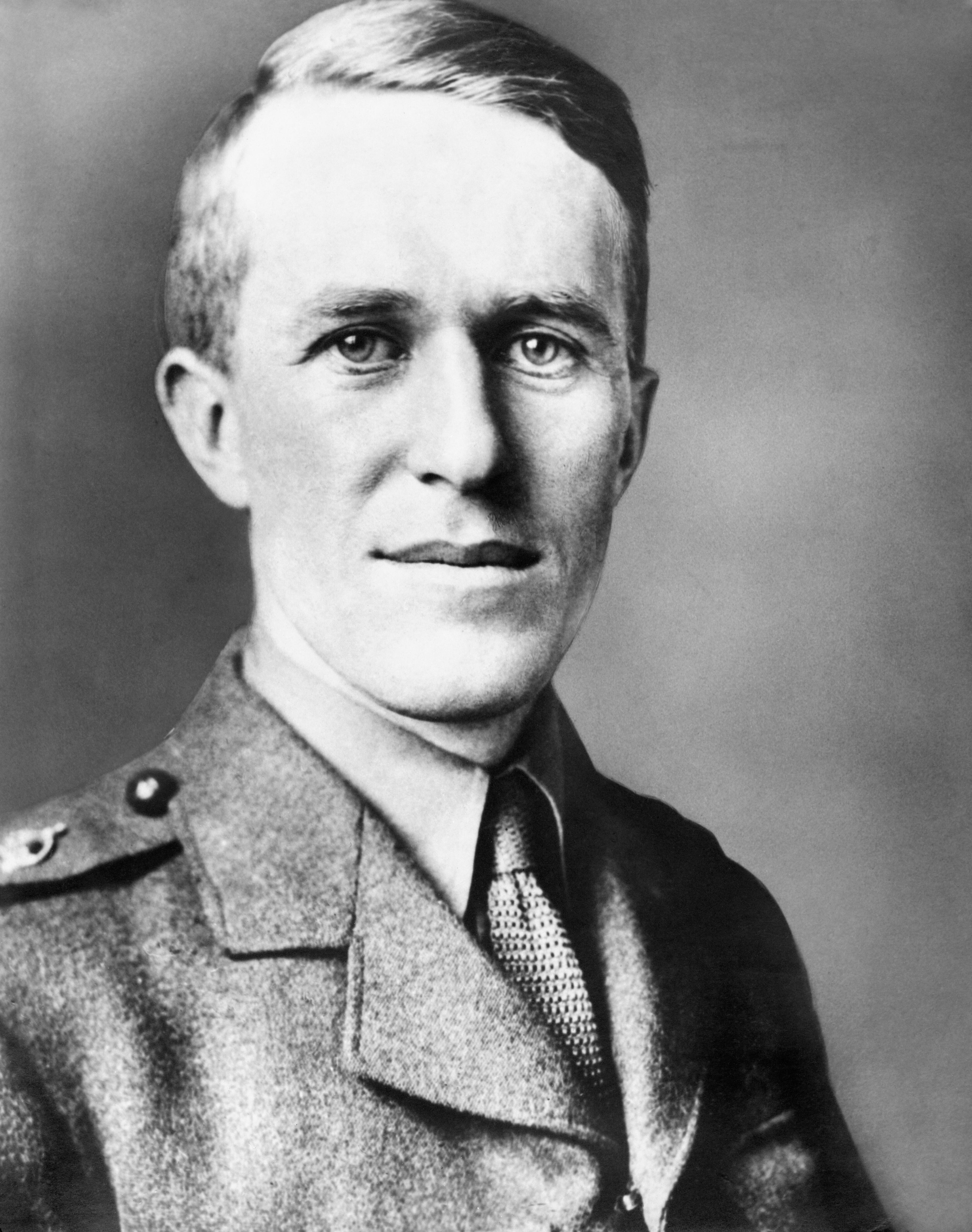
T. E. Lawrence

Similarly, T. E. Lawrence's biographer Flora Armitage writes about being born outside of marriage: "The effect on [T. E.] Lawrence of this discovery was profound; it added to the romantic urge for heroic conduct—the dream of the Sangreal—the seed of ambition, the desire for honor and distinction: the redemption of the blood from its taint."

Another biographer, John E. Mack, writes in a similar vein: "[H]is mother required of him that he redeem her fallen state by his own special achievements, by being a person of unusual value who accomplishes great deeds, preferably religious and ideally on an heroic scale. Lawrence did his best to fulfill heroic deeds. But he was plagued, especially after the events of the war activated his inner conflicts, by a deep sense of failure. Having been deceived as a child he was later to feel that he himself was a deceiver—that he had deceived the Arabs..." "Mrs. Lawrence's original hope that her sons would provide her personal redemption by becoming Christian missionaries was fulfilled only by [Lawrence's brother] Robert."

Mack elaborates further: "Part of his creativity and originality lies in his 'irregularity,' in his capacity to remain outside conventional ways of thinking, a tendency which... derives, at least in part, from his illegitimacy. Lawrence's capacity for invention and his ability to see unusual or humorous relationships in familiar situations come also... from his illegitimacy. He was not limited to established or 'legitimate' solutions or ways of doing things, and thus his mind was open to a wider range of possibilities and opportunities. [At the same time] Lawrence's illegitimacy had important social consequences and placed limitations upon him, which rankled him deeply... At times he felt socially isolated when erstwhile friends shunned him upon learning of his background. Lawrence's delight in making fun of regular officers and other segments of 'regular' society... derived... at least in part from his inner view of his own irregular situation. His fickleness about names for himself [he changed his name twice to distance himself from his "Lawrence of Arabia" persona] is directly related... to his view of his parents and to his identification with them [his father had changed his name after running off with T. E. Lawrence's future mother]."

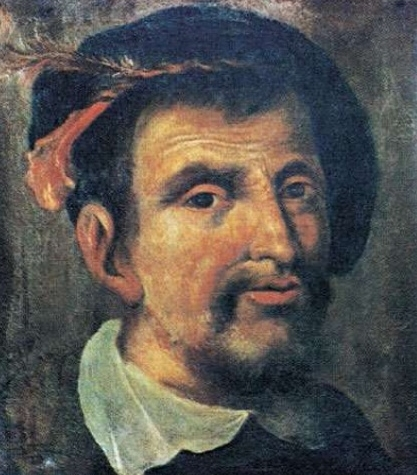
Fernando (Hernando) Columbus

Christopher Columbus' first son, Diego Columbus (born between 1474 and 1480; died 1526), by Columbus' wife, Filipa Moniz Perestrelo, followed in his father's footsteps to become the 2nd Admiral of the Indies, 2nd Viceroy of the Indies, and 4th Governor of the Indies. Columbus' second son, Fernando Columbus (also known as Hernando; 1488–1539), was his out-of-wedlock son by Beatriz Enríquez de Arana and—while he grew up with a fair amount of power and privilege—due to the circumstances of his birth he never quite gained the prominence his father did. Hernando Columbus' biographer Edward Wilson-Lee says Hernando "always wanted to prove himself his father's son in spirit. [S]o he undertook th[e] extraordinary project [of] building a universal library that would [hold] every book in the world... [H]e very much saw this as a counterpart to his father's desire to circumnavigate the world.... Hernando was going to build a universal library that would circumnavigate the world of knowledge."

However, realizing that such a large collection of books would not be very useful without a way of organizing and distilling them, he employed an army of readers to read every book and distill it down to a short summary, or "epitome". The result was the Libro de los Epitomes (Book of Epitomes). Soon after Hernando's death in 1539 at age 50, this volume went missing for nearly 500 years—until in 2019 it was serendipitously discovered in a University of Copenhagen special collection. Many of the early printed publications that the Book of Epitomes summarizes are now lost; but thanks to the out-of-wedlock bibliophile Hernando Columbus, eager to emulate in his own way his father and "legitimate" half-brother, invaluable insights are becoming available into the knowledge and thought of the early Modern Period.

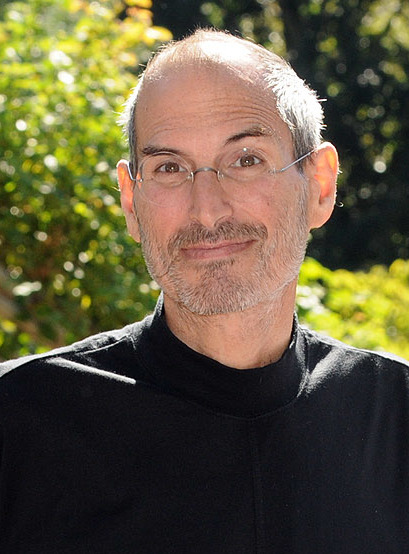
Steve Jobs

In more recent times, Steve Jobs' adoption due to the nonmarried status of his biological parents influenced his life and career. He confided to close friends that he was driven by the pain he felt about having been put up for adoption and not having known who his birth parents were.

== Violence and honor killings ==
While births outside marriage are considered acceptable in many world regions, in some parts of the world they remain highly stigmatized. Women who have given birth under such circumstances are often subjected to violence at the hands of their families; and may even become victims of so-called honor killings. These women may also be prosecuted under laws forbidding sexual relations outside marriage and may face consequent punishments, including stoning.

== In fiction ==
Illegitimacy has for centuries provided a motif and plot element to works of fiction by prominent authors, including William Shakespeare, Benjamin Franklin, Henry Fielding, Voltaire, Jane Austen, Alexandre Dumas, père, Charles Dickens, Nathaniel Hawthorne, Wilkie Collins, Anthony Trollope, Alexandre Dumas, fils, George Eliot, Victor Hugo, Leo Tolstoy, Ivan Turgenev, Fyodor Dostoyevsky, Thomas Hardy, Alphonse Daudet, Bolesław Prus, Henry James, Joseph Conrad, E. M. Forster, C. S. Forester, Marcel Pagnol, Grace Metalious, John Irving, and George R. R. Martin.

== Notables ==
Some pre-20th-century modern individuals whose unconventional "illegitimate" origins did not prevent them from making (and in some cases helped inspire them to make) notable contributions to humanity's art or learning have included Leone Battista Alberti (1404–1472), Leonardo da Vinci (1452–1519), Erasmus of Rotterdam 1466–1536), Jean le Rond d'Alembert (1717–1783), Alexander Hamilton (1755 or 1757–1804), James Smithson (1764–1829), Vasily Zhukovsky (1783–1852), John James Audubon (1785–1851), Alexander Herzen (1812–1870), Jenny Lind (1820–1887), Alexandre Dumas, fils (1824–1895), and Sarah Bernhardt (1844–1923).

== See also ==
- Affiliation (family law)
- Anne Orthwood's bastard trial
- Bastard (Jewish law)
- Bastard (law of England and Wales)
- Childwite
- Colonial American bastardy laws
- Defect of birth
- Filiation
- Hague Adoption Convention
- Illegitimacy in fiction
- Legitimacy law in England and Wales
- Legitime
- Marks of distinction
- Non-paternity event
- Orphan
- Premarital sex
- Surnames of illegitimate children
- Unintended pregnancy

== Bibliography ==
- Flora Armitage, The Desert and the Stars: a Biography of Lawrence of Arabia, illustrated with photographs, New York, Henry Holt and Company, 1955.
- Andrzej Garlicki, "Piłsudski, Józef Klemens," Polski słownik biograficzny, vol. XXVI, Wrocław, Polska Akademia Nauk, 1981, pp. 311–24.
- Shirley Foster Hartley, Illegitimacy, University of California Press, 1975.
- Alysa Levene, Thomas Nutt & Samantha Williams, eds. Illegitimacy in Britain, 1700–1920. Palgrave Macmillan; 2005 [cited 24 September 2011]. ISBN 978-1-4039-9065-5.
- John E. Mack. A Prince of Our Disorder: The Life of T. E. Lawrence. Harvard University Press; 1998 [cited September 24, 2011]. ISBN 978-0-674-70494-7.
- Charles Simic, "You Laugh Uncontrollably" (review of Bohumil Hrabal, Mr. Kafka and Other Tales from the Time of the Cult, translated from the Czech by Paul Wilson, New Directions, 142 pp., $14.95 [paper]), The New York Review of Books, vol. LXIII, no. 8 (May 12, 2016), pp. 58–60.
- Jenny Teichman. Illegitimacy: an examination of bastardy. Cornell University Press; 1982 [cited September 24, 2011]. ISBN 978-0-8014-1491-6.
- Nora Titone, My Thoughts Be Bloody: The Bitter Rivalry between Edwin and John Wilkes Booth that Led to an American Tragedy, New York, Simon and Schuster, 2010 [cited September 24, 2011], ISBN 978-1-4165-8605-0.
