= Authentic instrument =

Authentic instrument may refer to:

- Historically informed performance
- Public instrument
