= O.R v an Tard Chlairaitheoir =

Irish Supreme Court case

O.R. v an tArd-Chlairaitheoir
- Coat of arms of Ireland
- Court: Supreme Court of Ireland
- Full case name: M.R. and D.R. (suing by their father and next friend O.R.) & ors v An tArd-Chláraitheoir & ors
- Citation: [2014] IESC 60

Case history
- Appealed from: High Court of Ireland
- Appealed to: Supreme Court of Ireland

Court membership
- Judges sitting: Denham CJ, Murray J, Hardiman J, O'Donnell J, McMenamin J, McKechnie J, Clarke J

Case opinions
- Decision by: McKechnie J.

Keywords
- Constitution Separation of Powers Surrogacy

M.R. and D.R. (suing by their father and next friend O.R.) & ors v An tArd-Chláraitheoir & ors, [2014] IESC 60 is an Irish Supreme Court case in which the Court held that the Civil Registration Act 2004 only allows the birth mother to be on the birth certificate. Thus, children born through surrogacy will have the name of their birth mother (the surrogate) on their birth certificate and not of the genetic mother, who intends to raise them.

== Background ==
Mrs R wished to have her name on the birth certificate of her twins which was carried to term by her sister L, the surrogate. The registrar refused to do this. Mrs R then went to the High Court in aid of a court order which would direct the registrar to rectify the birth certificate. In the High Court, Mrs R argued that section 37 of the Status of Children Act meant that motherhood is determined by genetics. The registrar based their argument on the legal principle of "mater semper certa est" (the mother is always certain). This principle is the presumption that the woman that gave birth to the child is the mother of that child. The High Court ruled in favor of Mrs R and the registrar appealed.

== Holding of the Supreme Court ==
The Court allowed the appeal, meaning that only birth mothers could be on the birth certificate. Denham CJ, allowing the appeal, said that there is no definition of mother in the Irish Constitution, however, there is also no prohibition on legislating surrogacy. The Court was of the view that laws on surrogacy particularly affect the rights of children and their genetic parents and create complex relationships. Thus, it was decided that it would be beyond the means of the Court to make a precedent for surrogacy rights and expressed that laws concerning surrogacy should be dealt with in the Oireachtas.

=== Concurrences ===
==== O'Donnell J ====
The current legal position was justified because it was proportionate to assert that the birth mother was the mother recorded on the birth certificate. He went on to state that there may be legal issues if the birth mother continued to be registered as the mother after the birth of the child. The judge acknowledged that where the system fails to regulate assisted reproduction, it fails to acknowledge the existence of the genetic mother, which is crucial for financial issues and personal life regarding the family of that child.

Nonetheless, he also noted that there is a gap in the legislation in regards to surrogacy. He stated that “generations of children have now been born in Ireland through assisted reproduction into a legal half world where the only constraints on the process are those imposed by the dictates of a private market and the sense of responsibility of practitioners”.

===== McKechnie J =====
Mrs R deserved to be recognized as the mother, however the legislation did not provide for this. It is the Oireachtas' job to write the law and the Courts' job to interpret the law.

==== Hardiman J ====
In his judgement, the judge addressed the need for legislation on surrogacy. Failure to adopt new law in the area of assisted human reproduction is important as "it affects them [mothers and children] in a peculiar and intimate fashion which makes statutory law reform in this area more than urgent."

==== McMenamin J ====
McMenamin J points out in his judgement that science is constantly evolving and therefore, the Legislature must keep in line with new sciences.

=== Dissent ===
==== Clarke J ====
He opined that the child shared features of both the genetic and the birth mother. The judge stated that he would have made a declaration stating that Mrs R is the mother, without prejudicing the birth mother.

== Subsequent developments ==
Emily Logan, Chief Commissioner of the Irish Human Rights and Equality Commission said “This is an important case that raises serious human rights and equality issues concerning assisted human reproduction, for which there is currently a legal gap in Ireland."

In 2015, the Children and Family Relationships Act was enacted. It covered assisted human reproduction but did not include surrogacy.

In 2017, a Bill on the assisted human reproduction was introduced by the Oireachtas. This Bill would be the first piece of legislation to regulate surrogacy in Ireland.
