= Minute of Agreement =

Scottish legal procedure

A Minute of Agreement is a legal procedure available in Scotland. It is a document drawn up between two or more parties in the presence of their solicitors, without the need for formal court action. In its usual format, it will contain numbered paragraphs that record formal but legally binding provisions by which each party has agreed to be bound. If it contains any provision which is enforceable in Scotland, it can be registered in other parts of the United Kingdom for recognition and enforcement. A Minute of Agreement can also be registered for recognition and enforcement in EU Member States or non-EU European Free Trade Association (EFTA) countries. A separate arrangement applies to Gibraltar. A foreign equivalent may also be known as an Authentic Instrument.

== Enforcement in Scotland ==
A Minute of Agreement can only be enforced in Scotland after it has been registered for preservation and execution in the Books of Council and Session. Registration is governed by Chapter 62 of the rules of the Court of Session and the original document is preserved by the Keeper of the Registers of Scotland, a function of the National Records of Scotland. A party can enforce any provisions contained in a Minute of Agreement by applying to the Keeper for an extracted copy of the original (an 'extract'). Enforcement against another party who resides or has assets in Scotland is carried out by a Messenger-at-Arms, who is an officer of the Court of Session (the supreme civil court in Scotland).

== Recognition and enforcement in other jurisdictions of the United Kingdom ==
A Minute of Agreement can be registered for recognition and enforcement in England & Wales and in Northern Ireland. Registration in those jurisdictions is regulated in Scotland by Rules of the Court of Session. Recognition is governed by the Civil Jurisdiction and Judgments Act 1982. Enforcement is carried out under the civil procedures of those jurisdictions.

== Recognition and enforcement in Member States of the European Union ==
Registration within the European Union is regulated in Scotland by Rules of the Court of Session. Recognition is governed by the Brussels I regulation (for non maintenance provisions) or the Maintenance regulation (for maintenance provisions). Enforcement is carried out under the civil procedures of those jurisdictions.

== Recognition and enforcement in Member States of the European Free Trade Association ==
Registration within the European Free Trade Association is also regulated in Scotland by Rules of the Court of Session. Recognition is governed by the Lugano Convention of 2007. Enforcement is carried out under the civil procedures of those jurisdictions.

== Recognition and enforcement in Gibraltar ==
Registration in Gibraltar is regulated in Scotland by Rules of the Court of Session. Recognition is governed by The Civil Jurisdiction and Judgments Act 1982 (Gibraltar) Order 1997 No. 2602. Enforcement is carried out under the civil procedures of that jurisdiction.

== The United Kingdom's exit from the European Union ==
Following the United Kingdom's exit from the European Union, references regarding recognition and enforcement in Member States of the European Union under the Brussels I regulation (for non maintenance provisions contained within a Minute of Agreement) or the Maintenance regulation (for maintenance provisions) may no longer apply.

== See also ==
- Brussels Regime
- European Enforcement Order
- Public instrument
