= Presumption =

In law, an inference of a particular fact

In law, a presumption is an "inference of a particular fact". There are two types of presumptions: rebuttable presumptions and irrebuttable (or conclusive) presumptions. A rebuttable presumption will either shift the burden of production (requiring the disadvantaged party to produce some evidence to the contrary) or the burden of proof (requiring the disadvantaged party to show the presumption is wrong); in short, a fact finder can reject a rebuttable presumption based on other evidence. Conversely, a conclusive/irrebuttable presumption cannot be challenged by contradictory facts or evidence. Sometimes, a presumption must be triggered by a predicate fact—that is, the fact must be found before the presumption applies.

== History ==
The ancient Jewish law code, the Talmud, included reasoning from presumptions (hazakah), propositions taken to be true unless there was reason to believe otherwise, such as "One does not ordinarily pay a debt before term."

The same concept was found in ancient Roman law, where, for example, if there was doubt as to whether a child was really the issue of someone who had been left money in a will, the presumption was in favour of the child. Medieval Roman and canon law graded presumptions according to strength: light, medium or probable, and violent. These gradings and many individual presumptions were taken over into English law in the seventeenth century by Edward Coke.

== Specific presumptions ==
A number of presumptions are found in most common law jurisdictions. Examples of these presumptions include:

- The presumption of death. A person who has been absent for seven years without explanation and "gone to parts unknown" is presumed dead at common law. The time period it takes for the presumption to arise has often been modified by statute.
- The presumption of sanity. A person who faces criminal trial is presumed sane until the opposite is proved. Similarly, a person is presumed to have testamentary capacity until there is evidence to undermine that presumption.
- The presumption of innocence, which holds that the prosecution bears the burden of proof in a criminal case with the result that the accused may be acquitted without putting forward any evidence.
- The presumption of legitimacy or presumption of paternity, which presumes that a husband is the legal father of a child born to his wife during the marriage, or within nine months after the marriage is ended by death, legal separation, or divorce. Some jurisdictions also hold that a presumption of paternity arises when a father accepts a child into his home, or publicly represents that he is the child's father.
- A presumption of survivorship has referred to a number of different presumptions. The term is sometimes used to refer to presumptions that one or another of two persons lived the longer when they died together in the same accident. The presumption that two or more people who establish a joint account intend for the survivors to have the assets put into the fund upon the death of one of the joint account holders has also been called the "presumption of survivorship".
- The presumption of mailing presumes that a properly addressed letter delivered to the post office or a common carrier was in fact delivered and received by the addressee.
- The presumption of fraud or undue influence arises where a person in a position of trust over another, such as a guardian or the holder of a power of attorney applies the other person's assets to their own benefit.
- The presumption of validity is another way of expressing a burden of proof: the official acts of courts are presumed valid, and those who would challenge them must overcome this presumption. This is also termed the presumption of regularity.
- The presumption of advancement in relation to transfers from husbands to wives and from fathers to children.
- In commercial contracts, there is a presumption that parties to a contract intend all disputes between them to be determined within the same forum. This presumption is also known as "one-stop adjudication" and reflects the belief that contracts are entered into by rational business parties. A German Bundesgerichtshof (Federal Court of Justice) decision made on 27 February 1970 thought there was "every reason to presume that reasonable parties will wish to have the relationships created by their contract and the claims arising therefrom ... decided by the same tribunal and not by two different tribunals", and the Federal Court of Australia in Comandate Marine Corp v Pan Australia Shipping Pty Ltd. (2006) referred to a "sensible commercial presumption that the parties did not intend the inconvenience of having possible disputes from their transaction being heard in two places". The House of Lords in Premium Nafta Products Ltd (20th Defendant) and Ors v. Fili Shipping Company Ltd and Ors (2007) noted that "this approach to the issue of construction is now firmly embedded as part of the law of international commerce" and endorsed a ruling the Court of Appeal made on this basis, stating that this presumption "must now be accepted as part of our [England and Wales] law too".
- In the law of the United States, the presumption of constitutionality presumes that all statutes are drafted in accordance with Federal and state constitutional requirements. The party challenging the constitutionality of a statute bears the burden of proof, and any doubts are resolved against that party. If there are two reasonable interpretations of a statute, one of which is constitutional and the other not, the courts choose the path that permits upholding the statute.

== Conclusive (irrebuttable) presumption ==
A conclusive presumption, also known as an irrebuttable presumption, is a type of presumption used in several legal systems. In English law, a conclusive presumption is a presumption of law that cannot be rebutted by evidence and must be taken to be the case whatever the evidence to the contrary. For example, a child below the age of criminal responsibility is presumed to be incapable of committing a crime.

=== Australia ===
In Australian law, it is a conclusive presumption that no child under the age of 10 can be held responsible for criminal action. This presumption exists to protect children by acknowledging that they do not have sufficient development to understand the gravity and consequences of committing a criminal act.

=== Canada ===
Recent amendments to Canada's impaired driving law allow the Crown to rely on a conclusive presumption. Normally, where the police conduct a breathalyzer test within 2 hours of the operation of a conveyance (or care and control), the court can accept the blood alcohol concentration as being the same at the time of the operation of the vehicle as at the time of the offence. If the test is conducted outside the two hours, and the blood alcohol concentration is greater than 20 mg of alcohol/100 mL of blood, there is now a conclusive presumption that the blood alcohol concentration can be increased by 5 mg of alcohol/100 mL of blood for each 30 minutes.

=== England and Wales ===
A child below the age of criminal responsibility cannot be held legally responsible for their actions, and so cannot be convicted of committing a criminal offence. The age has continually been under debate with adjustments being made in line with rulings, the results of psychological research and to some extent public pressure. The age was seven at common law, and raised by the Children and Young Persons Act 1933 to eight (section 50) and by the Children and Young Persons Act 1963 to ten, at which it remains.

In the case of rape, if it is found that the defendant intentionally deceived the complainant as to the "nature or the purpose of the act", or if "the defendant intentionally induced the complainant to consent by impersonation of a 'person known personally to the complainant'", it can be conclusively presumed the defendant is guilty of rape and must be convicted.

== See also ==
- Implied covenant of good faith and fair dealing
- Legal burden of proof
- Prima facie
