= Presumption of regularity =

Presumption in English evidence law

The presumption of regularity is a presumption that forms part of the law of evidence of England and Wales. It also plays a role in some other countries.

It is expressed by the maxim of law omnia praesumuntur rite et solemniter esse acta donec probetur in contrarium, (lit. 'Everything is presumed right and solemn about this act until proven to the contrary'); which may be shortened to omnia praesumuntur rite et solemniter esse acta (lit. 'everything is presumed right and solemn about this act') or omnia praesumuntur rite esse acta (lit. 'Everything is presumed right about this act').

== Official actions ==
Where it has been proved that an "official act" has been done, it will be presumed, until the contrary is proved, that the said act "complied with any necessary formalities" and that the person who did it was "duly appointed".

This is a presumption of law.

The following cases are relevant to this presumption:

- R v Gordon (1789) 1 Leach 515, (1789) 1 East PC 315
- R v Jones (1806) 31 St Tr 251, (1806) 2 Camp 131
- R v Verelst (1813) 3 Camp 432
- R v Catesby (1824) 2 B & C 814, (1824) 4 Dow & Ry KB 434, (1824) 2 Dow & Ry MC 278
- R v Rees (1834) 6 C & P 606
- R v Murphy (1837) 8 C & P 297
- R v Townsend (1841) C & Mar 178
- R v Newton (1843) 1 C & K 469
- R v Manwaring (1856) 26 LJMC 10, (1856) Dears & B 132, (1856) 7 Cox 192
- R v Cresswell (1876) 1 QBD 446, (1876) 33 LT 760, (1876) 40 JP 536, (1876) 13 Cox 126
- R v Stewart (1876) 13 Cox 296
- R v Roberts (1878) 14 Cox 101, (1878) 42 JP 630, (1878) 38 LT 690, CCR
- Gibbins v Skinner [1951] 2 K.B. 379, [1951] 1 All E.R. 1049, [1951] 1 T.L.R. 1159, (1951) 115 J.P. 360, 49 L.G.R. 713
- Campbell v Wallsend Shipway and Engineering Co Ltd [1977] Crim LR 351, DC
- Dillon v R [1982] AC 484, [1982] 2 WLR 538, [1982] 1 All ER 1017, 74 Cr App R 274, [1982] Crim LR 438, PC
- Gage v Jones [1983] RTR 508, DC
- Kynaston v Director of Public Prosecutions, 87 Cr App R 200, DC

== Business transactions ==
Where it has been proved that "necessary business transactions" have been carried out, it will be presumed, until the contrary is proved, that the said transactions were carried out in the order (if any) that they are required to be carried out. See Eaglehill Ltd v J Needham (Builders) Ltd [1973] AC 992, HL.

== Mechanical contraptions ==
Where it has been proved that a "mechanical device" is normally in "good working order", it will be presumed, until the contrary is proved, that it was in good working order on any relevant occasion. See Tingle Jacobs & Co v Kennedy [1964] 1 WLR 638, CA

== In the United States ==
In the United States, the presumption of regularity is a principle of deference that narrows judicial scrutiny over executive decisions. It applies to "a subset of factual disputes about administrative motivations and internal processes".
