= Mater semper certa est =

Roman legal principle that a woman who gives birth to a child is its mother

In Roman law, mater semper certa est (from Latin: "the mother is always certain") is a legal principle which has the power of praesumptio iuris et de iure ("presumption of law and by law"), meaning that no counter-evidence can be made against this principle. It provides that the mother of the child is conclusively established, from the moment of birth, by the mother's role in the birth.

Since egg donation, or embryo donation with surrogacy, started using the technique of in-vitro fertilization, the principle of mater semper certa est has been shaken, since a child may have a genetic and a gestational ("birth"), let alone a "social", mother who are different individuals. Since then some countries have converted the old natural law to an equivalent codified law; in 1997 Germany introduced paragraph 1591 Mutterschaft ("motherhood") of the BGB (civil code) reading Mutter eines Kindes ist die Frau, die es geboren hat ("the mother of a child is the woman who gave birth to it"). This has also been tested in the British case of Freddy McConnell.

The Roman law principle, however, does not stop at the mother, in fact it continues with pater semper incertus est ("The father is always uncertain"). This was regulated by the law of pater est, quem nuptiae demonstrant ("the father is he to whom marriage points"; see presumption of legitimacy). Essentially paternity fraud had originally been a marriage fraud in the civil code (Note: In Germany, the historic Ehelichkeitsanfechtungsklage ("action in dispute of legitimacy") was simply renamed as Vaterschaftsanfechtungsklage ("action in dispute of fatherhood") when legal paternity was redefined.) due to this principle. Today some married fathers use the modern tools of DNA testing to ensure a certainty on their fatherhood.

== See also ==
- Lydia Fairchild, a woman whose DNA tests seemed to imply she was not the mother of the child she just gave birth to.
- Partus sequitur ventrem
- Matrilineality
- Presumption of legitimacy
