= Public instrument =

A public instrument is any legal instrument (legal document) recorded with and authenticated by a public office or employee. To carry weight, any such instrument, must be genuine and authentic. Public instruments consequently must bear the name, title, and seal of the official that issued them, and should be written in the presence of witnesses who attested to them.

A public instrument is generally admissible in evidence without the necessity of preliminary proof of its authenticity and due execution. In other words, public instruments are self-authenticating documentary evidence. A presumption of regularity and validity attaches to public instruments; for the instrument to be rebutted, it must be proven in court to contain a willful material error.

Typical types of public instruments include:

- State and federal laws
- Laws of foreign nations
- Vital records
- Legislative acts
  - Acts of statute (acts of Parliament or Congress)
  - Subordinate legislation
- Judicial instruments
  - Judgments, orders, and decrees
  - Court writs or process
  - Court records
  - Rules of court
- notarial acts
- Municipal and county charters
- Ordinances and resolutions of municipalities
- Administrative agency rules
- Items under official governmental seal
  - Patents, authentication certificates, apostilles, etc.
- Any deed or formal agreement recorded and filed with a government register or records office
  - Title-deeds, conveyances, wills, company charters, public inventories, etc.

== Civil and Scots law ==
Public instruments at civil law are generally known as public instruments (Germ: öffentliche Urkunde, Fr: acte public, Sp: instrumento público) and under Scots law as probative or self-proving instruments. These categories refer more to the level of evidenciary validity given an instrument in court. Under these legal systems, to be received as a public instrument, a document must be subjected to a number of conditions. These include:

- Execution before two or more witnesses, or before an authorized civil-law notary or public officer
- Testified by a public seal
- Rendered public by the authority of a competent judicial officer
- Certified as a copy of a public register.

Any such instrument is said to prove itself, that is, it has the privilege of being free from challenge or rebuttal at court.

== See also ==
- Evidence (law)
- Minute of Agreement
- Vital record
