= Presumption of legitimacy =

Legal assumption that a child born during a marriage is the husband's

In common law, the "presumption of legitimacy" is a legal presumption that states that a child born within the subsistence of a marriage is presumed to be the child of the husband.

Paternity is considered an important issue in determining the rules of succession. Illegitimate children were originally excluded from royal succession, noble status, hereditary titles and property.

== See also ==
- Mater semper certa est
