= Marks of distinction =

Mark in heraldry

A mark of distinction, in heraldry, is a charge showing that the bearer of a shield is not (as defined by the rules or laws of heraldry in most, though not all, countries and situations) descended by blood from the original bearer. The "mark of distinction" (which is so called as it is supposed to "make distinct" that the bearer is not one of the possible legitimate heirs or heiresses) usually refers to a context of illegitimacy, the illegitimate offspring being regarded as a "stranger in blood" to his natural father. The mark of distinction may also be applied upon the adoption of a surname and arms of a family from whom the bearer is not descended.

== See also ==
- Cadency
