= Presumption of paternity =

Concept in family law and common law

Presumption of paternity in paternity law and common law is the legal determination that a man is "presumed to be" a child's biological father without additional supportive evidence, usually as a result of marriage. Generally associated with marriage, a presumption of paternity can also be made by court order, contact over time with a child, or simple cohabitation with the mother. If there is no presumption of paternity, a process such as recognition may be used to establish paternity.

== See also ==
- Presumption of legitimacy
- Recognition (family law)
