= Paternity law =

Body of law underlying legal obligations

Paternity law is the body of law underlying legal relationship between a father and his biological or adopted children and deals with the rights and obligations of both the father and the child to each other as well as to others. A child's paternity may be relevant in relation to issues of legitimacy, inheritance and rights to a putative father's title or surname, as well as the biological father's rights to child custody in the case of separation or divorce and obligations for child support.

Under common law, a child born to a married woman is presumed to be the child of her husband by virtue of a "presumption of paternity" or presumption of legitimacy. In consideration of a possible non-paternity event (which may or may not include paternity fraud) these presumptions may be rebutted by evidence to the contrary, for example, in disputed child custody and child support cases during divorce, annulment or legal separation.

In the case of a father not married to a child's mother, depending on the laws of the jurisdiction:

- a man may accept the paternity of the child in what is called an acknowledgment of paternity, voluntary acknowledgement of paternity or affidavit of parentage,
- the mother or legal authorities can file a petition for a determination of paternity against a putative father, or
- paternity can be determined by the courts through estoppel over time.

Today, when paternity is in dispute or doubt, paternity testing may be used to conclusively resolve the issue.

== Overview ==
The legal process of determining paternity normally results in the naming of a man to a child's birth certificate as the child's legal father. A paternity finding resolves issues of legitimacy, and may be followed by court rulings that relate to child support and maintenance, custody and guardianship.

== Unmarried fathers ==
Generally, under common law, a biological father has a legal obligation for the maintenance or support of his biological offspring, whether or not he is legally competent to marry the child's mother.

In jurisdictions where there is no presumption of paternity there is a process for fathers to recognise their children and become the legal father of the child.

== Married fathers ==
In the United States, where a child is conceived or born during wedlock, the husband is legally presumed to be the father of the child. Some states have a legal process for a husband to disavow paternity, such that a biological father can be named as the parent of a child conceived or born during a marriage. In most states, any claim of non-paternity by a husband must be heard by a court.

If parents litigate a divorce case without raising the issue of paternity, in most states they will be barred from disputing the husband's paternity in a later court proceeding. Depending upon state law, it may nonetheless be possible for a man claiming to be the child's biological father to commence a paternity case following the divorce.

== Legal proceedings ==
Where paternity of the child is in question, a party may ask the court to determine paternity of one or more possible fathers (called putative fathers), typically based initially upon sworn statements and then upon testimony or other evidence.

Once paternity has been legally established, if the court finds that to do so would be contrary to the best interest of the child, in most U.S. states a court may deny DNA testing or decline to remove a husband from a child's birth certificate based upon DNA testing.

A successful application to the court results in an order assigning paternity to a specific man, possibly including support responsibility and/or visitation rights, or declaring that one or more men (possibly including the husband of the mother) are not the father of the child. A disavowal action is a legal proceeding where a putative father attempts to prove to the court that he is not the father; if successful, it relieves the former putative father of legal responsibility for the child.

On the other hand, it could be the case where several putative fathers are fighting to establish custody. In the United States, a state may legally bar a third party from disputing the paternity of a child born within an intact marriage.

Some paternity laws assign full parental responsibility to fathers even in cases of women lying about contraception, using deceit (such as oral sex followed by self-artificial insemination) or statutory rape by a woman (Hermesmann v. Seyer).

== Paternity and inheritance rights ==
If the context of inheritance rights, it will be the heirs of the deceased person who are attempting to dispute or establish paternity. In some states, DNA testing will be dispositive to establish paternity. In many jurisdictions, however, there are a variety of rules and time restrictions that can deny inheritance rights to biological children of a deceased father.

== See also ==
- Bradley Amendment
- Carol Smart
- Family law
- Filiation
- Lord Mansfield's Rule
- Parental leave
- Parenting plan
- Paternity Court
- Paternity fraud
