= Non-paternity event =

Situation where the biological father is not who it was presumed to be

In genetics, a non-paternity event (also known as misattributed paternity, not parent expected, or NPE) occurs when an individual's presumed father is not in fact their biological father. This is a type of misattributed parentage experience (MPE) which can involve inaccurate assumptions made by an individual, their parents, or medical professionals. An NPE may result from sperm donation, closed adoption, heteropaternal superfecundation, promiscuity, paternity fraud, sexual assault, or medical errors during the process of assisted reproduction such as mixups during procedures such as in vitro fertilization and artificial insemination. Where there is uncertainty, the most reliable technique for establishing paternity is through genetic testing. Currently, there are many direct-to-consumer companies that offer paternity testing. Internationally, June 27 is recognized as NPE Awareness Day.

== Definitions and uses ==
The term non-paternity event was first used in 2000 in a study of the surname "Sykes" and the Y-chromosome haplotype to denote if non-Sykes males had been introduced into the family line. Bellis et al. (2005) stated that non-paternity "occurs when a child is believed to have been fathered by the husband (or partner) but is actually the child of another man." Non-paternity events are also sometimes referred to as paternity, paternal discrepancy or false paternity. Although it is sometimes referred to as paternity fraud, that suggests that the misattribution was deliberate, rather than accidental. In a scientific review of non-paternity studies since the 1950s, Bellis et al. (2005) stated that knowingly covering up an accidental pregnancy that resulted from infidelity is often assumed to be the reason for non-paternity but that there are many other reasons: "for example, where sex with the long term partner has not produced children a woman might seek conception elsewhere." Other reasons include closed adoption, accidental misattribution resulting from multiple relationships in close succession as well as medical mistakes, such as mixups during procedures such as in vitro fertilization and artificial insemination.

In genetic genealogy, the term non-paternity is often used in a wider context to indicate a break in the link between the Y-chromosome and the surname. Such a breakage may occur because of formal or informal adoption, premarital or extramarital intercourse or rape; a woman raising a grandchild as her own to cover for her unwed daughter's pregnancy or when individuals use a different surname than their biological father, such as their mother's maiden name, a stepfather's name, the use of aliases or a legal name change.

== Testing for non-paternity ==
Genetic testing is the most reliable method to establish paternity, although rare errors can occur due to genetic mutations or misinterpretation of test results. However, genetic testing is based on probabilities and is not always definitive. Jones et al. (2010) said, "Characteristics of the markers and the fact that they are analyzed by fallible humans can result in inconsistencies that present problems for parentage analysis." False negatives may occur due to low-quality samples, gene mutations, or genotyping errors (when a genotype is misread or inaccurately scored). There is a higher probability of accuracy when DNA from both parents can be tested. The accuracy increases even more when DNA from a sibling is available.

Overall, the incidence of misattributed parentage experiences ranges from about 0.4% to 5.9%, though it may be higher in certain populations. For example, in a United States sample of nearly 24,000 users of FamilyTreeDNA, 3% reported an NPE result. The discovery of previously unsuspected or undisclosed non-paternity may lead to social, psychological, and medical consequences. Non-paternity is medically relevant when interpreting the results and utility of genetic screening for hereditary illnesses. However, the requirements for consent and counseling vary by country.

== The role of direct-to-consumer genetic testing ==
The rise of direct-to-consumer genetic testing (DTC GT) has resulted in consumers learning about their NPE. This often leads to significant psychological and familial implications. Results from DTC GT tests, such as 23andMe, may provide this information in the form of a DNA Relatives results page which shows the name of the consumer that you are related to, and your presumed relationship based on the percentage of shared DNA, including the amount of shared DNA segments. When viewing this information, if one's presumed parent is not listed, or another parent is listed whom the consumer does not know, one may learn of their NPE.

Experiences of learning about one's NPE has been captured in the news. For example, In a Wall Street Journal article, several people who learned about their NPE through DTC GT discussed how discovering their biological parent's identity affected their sense of self and broader familial relationships, sparking difficult questions about whether parents should disclose to their children that they were donor conceived. Similarly, in The New York Times, two Canadian men discovered that they were switched at birth from DTC GT. Researchers have picked up on this phenomenon, and have sought to identify news outlets articulate how people discuss DTC GT. Specifically, in one paper the authors found that out of 100 news articles, nearly 79% of them discussed identifying new family members.

Experiences of learning about one's NPE has also been written about in books. Some of the relevant books include:

- Inheritance: A Memoir of Genealogy, Paternity and Love by Dani Shapiro
- The Lost Family: How DNA Testing is Upending Who We Are by Libby Copeland
- The Milkman's Son: A Memoir of Family History, A DNA Mystery, and a Story of Paternal Love by Randy Lindsay
- NPE* A story guide for unexpected DNA discoveries by Leeane R. Hay

== Rates of non-paternity ==
=== Typical births ===
It is difficult to accurately estimate the incidence of non-paternity events, and there have been large discrepancies in the research published on the topic. Often, data on non-paternity rates are reported tangentially to the primary goal of research without sufficient detail, and very few studies involve randomized samples. As such, it is not possible to make valid generalizations based on a large portion of the available literature. Bellis et al. (2005) found that between 1950 and 2004, the rates of non-paternity events published in scientific journals ranged from 0.8% to 30% with a median of 3.7%. According to a study published in The Lancet, "High rates have been quoted, but are often unsupported by any published evidence or based on unrepresentative population samples."

Turi King and Mark Jobling of the Department of Genetics at University of Leicester called the commonly cited 30% rate of non-paternity an "urban myth." According to King and Jobling, the figure is really around 2%. They also stated that non-paternity events is often impacted by cultural and socioeconomic factors and that it occurs more frequently among unmarried couples. The sociologist Michael Gilding concluded that inflated figures have been circulated by the media, the paternity testing industry, fathers' rights activists and evolutionary psychologists. He traced many of those overestimates back to a 1972 conference at which non-paternity rates as high as 30% were discussed. Gilding states that those data show only the incidence of non-paternity in which disputed parentage was the reason for paternity testing. In situations that disputed parentage was the reason for the paternity testing, there were higher levels with an incidence of 17% to 33% (median of 26.9%). Most at risk of parental discrepancy were those born to younger parents, to unmarried couples and those of lower socio-economic status or from certain ethnic and cultural groups.

=== Atypical multiple births ===
Rarely, genetic testing has revealed children from multiple births to have different fathers, which is known as heteropaternal superfecundation. One study estimated that the incidence of bipaternal twins born to white women in the United States is around one pair in 400. Another study found the prevalence to be approximately one pair in 13,000 cases.

== See also ==
- Cuckoldry
- Cicisbeo
- Issue (genealogy)
- Legitimacy (family law)
- Maury (talk show)
- Children of the plantation
- Sperm donation
- Egg donation
- Closed adoption
