= Paternity fraud =

Deliberate misidentification of a child's biological father

Paternity fraud is one form of misattributed paternity or paternal discrepancy. Specifically, paternity fraud is the intentional misidentification of a child's biological father. Paternity fraud is distinct from other, unintentional misattribution, which may arise from simple error, an accident such as a mix-up during fertility treatment, or a sexual assault.

== Occurrence ==
Research published in 2016 indicated that up to two percent of British fathers unknowingly raise a child who is the biological child of another man.

A 2005 scientific review of international published studies of paternal discrepancy found a range in incidence, around the world, from 0.8% to 30% (median 3.7%). However, as many of the studies were conducted between the 1950s and the 1980s, numbers may be unreliable due to the inaccuracies of genetic testing methods and procedures used at the time. One study, which published a rate near 30%, was performed on populations in which the purported father already suspected that he was not the genetic parent, rather than on a fully random population. Studies ranging in date from 1991 to 1999 quote the following incidence rates: 11.8% (Mexico), 4.0% (Canada), 2.8% (France), 1.4% and 1.6% (UK), and 0.8% (Switzerland). These numbers suggest that the widely quoted and unsubstantiated figure of 10% of non-paternal events is an overestimate. However, in studies that solely looked at couples who obtained paternity testing because paternity was being disputed, there are higher levels: an incidence of 17% to 33% (median of 26.9%). Most at risk were those born to younger parents, to unmarried couples and those of lower socio-economic status, or from certain cultural groups.

A 2008 study in the United Kingdom found that biological fathers were misidentified in 0.2% (1 in 500) of the cases processed by the Child Support Agency. Of that 0.2%, those resolved with DNA paternity testing between 2004 and 2008 showed that between 10 and 19% of mothers had misidentified the biological father; data about why mothers identified the wrong biological father were not available.

== Law by country ==
=== Australia ===
Since 1989, putative fathers in Australia can recover child support payments for children that are not their own.

In 2002, the Victorian County Court awarded Liam Neale Magill $70,000 compensation for damages and economic loss against his ex-wife, Meredith Magill as a result of DNA testing in 2000 that showed only one of three children he was paying support for was genetically his. That ruling was later overturned in 2005 by the Victorian Court of Appeal finding that "intent to deceive" by his ex-wife had not been proven regarding misrepresentations made by Ms. Magill in birth forms about the children's paternity. This ruling was in turn then appealed to the High Court of Australia.

In 2006, the High Court of Australia struck down the appeal, upholding the 2005 Victorian Court of Appeal ruling. Chief Justice Murray Gleeson in the 94 page High Court Ruling opined, "Without doubt the appellant's wife deceived him but the hurtful deception was in her infidelity, not in her failure to admit it." Mr. Magill as part of the ruling was also ordered to pay the Child Support Agency's legal fees during the previous 18 months of litigation.

=== Canada ===
Mr. Cornelio began paying child support for his ex-wife's twins after the couple separated in 1998. The former couple settled upon a joint custody agreement in 2002 that continued Mr. Cornelio's monetary child support for the twins. Shortly afterwards, Ms. Cornelio requested a reduction in visitation time along with an increase in support payments. Mr. Cornelio became suspicious of the paternity of the twins. A subsequent DNA test revealed that he was not their biological father. A request was made by Mr. Cornelio to be excused from paying further child support, claiming to be the victim of misrepresentation or fraud when Ms. Cornelio failed to disclose the extramarital affair when he signed the 2002 joint custody agreement.

The Ontario Superior Court of Justice in 2008 ruled against the request to be excused or reimbursed for child support payments. Judge van Rensburg, in deciding to deny the request, noted that Mr. Cornelio had wondered at the time of his separation if an affair by his ex-wife had actually been responsible for the twins. "It was not until access was interrupted and Ms. Cornelio commenced proceedings seeking increased child support that the respondent began pursuing this issue," the judge remarked. "The fact of that relationship – even if it has now become strained – is sufficient to require Mr. Cornelio to continue to contribute toward the children's material needs."

=== Finland ===
The default in Finnish law as of 2018 is that the husband is the acknowledged father of the child who is born into wedlock (or to a deceased husband). Only if the wife agrees can that initial determination be set to something else. However, from 2016, the general right the mother to solely allow or prevent the parental investigation was abolished. The default and immediately forcing juridical assumption of paternity of a husband was not changed in the latest 2015 act.

A man can bring up a later legal action to annul his paternity, disregarding of the resistance of his wife. The legal action for annulment may be brought in the district court by a man whose paternity has been determined on the basis of either marriage or by some other authoritative decision.

A man who has officially acknowledged paternity relinquishes his rights to further actions if he, knowing the woman had a sexual intercourse with another man, or that she has used foreign sperm for fertilization, has stated in writing following birth of the child that the child is biologically his.

Otherwise legally binding prebirth acknowledgment of a man must be rejected, if either the health care staff of the child supervisor do have a founded suspicion that the man is not a father of the child, or he is for any reason not capable of understanding what he is doing when acknowledging the paternity.

If a mother deliberately gives false information to the authorities that contributes to the erroneous establishment of paternity, she may be fined.

=== South Korea ===
In 2004, a South Korean man was awarded $42,380 compensation for pain and suffering when a DNA test established that the child he had with his ex-wife was not his. Ms. Doe had become pregnant prior to marriage and claimed that the child belonged to Mr. Doe. Mr. Doe married her as a result. Mr. Doe confronted Ms. Doe on discovering that the baby did not look like him at all, whereupon Ms. Doe claimed that the hospital must have switched the child at birth. When Mr. Doe moved to sue the hospital, Ms. Doe admitted that she had been pregnant with another man's baby. The court nullified the marriage as well.

=== Switzerland ===
On 5 January 2015, the Federal Supreme Court of Switzerland (decision 5A_619 of 2015) decided on a case wherein a plaintiff challenged the paternity of his (alleged) daughter. The plaintiff had his sperm examined in November 2009. As a result of the examination, the plaintiff's fertility was found to be 3%. The court contended that the alleged father should have started investigating his paternity as a consequence of that finding. The plaintiff actually had his non-paternity confirmed via DNA evidence in 2013 upon failure of his marriage. The court held that the one year time limit under Swiss civil code article 260c for filing an action lapsed due to the plaintiff's (the alleged father's) inactivity for more than two years. The Federal Supreme Court of Switzerland thus confirmed the ruling by the first instance and dismissed the appeal. It follows that the plaintiff's financial obligations as to his (alleged) daughter will not change.

=== United Kingdom ===
In the United Kingdom, paternity fraud, like adultery, is not a criminal offence except in the case of the lineage of the children of the British monarch under the Treason Act 1351 where the adulterers are punishable as adultering against the lineage of the King with the King's "companion, ... or the wife of the King's eldest son and heir". Knowingly making a false statement on a public document is a criminal offence, including naming someone who is not the biological father. As of 2008, no individual has been prosecuted in a case involving paternity fraud. A mother is permitted to not state the name of the biological father if she does not know it. Paternity fraud is a form of misattributed paternity.

The split in 2002 between a couple, identified for legal reasons as Mr. A and Ms. B, prompted Mr. A to pursue a parental contract to establish his non-married rights as their child's father. Ms. B then requested a DNA test that later showed Mr. A was not the (then) five year old's father. Following the discovery Mr. A then sued Ms. B for damages of up to £100,000 as a result of the deceit.

During 2007 in what was reported as the first known case of its kind to reach trial in Britain, the High Court ruled in favor of Mr. A awarding £7,500 distress damages with another £14,943 for holidays and meals out Mr. A spent on Ms. B (not the child). The judgment fell short of listed suit amount because the London court did not allow damages for the child's material costs incurred because of Mr. A's enjoyment of the relationship. The judge, Sir John Blofeld, said he was satisfied that Mr. A's motivation in coming to court was not as a lever for contact with the child but because he did not want "to be taken for a ride".

In 2019, the unnamed former wife of Richard Mason was ordered to pay him £250,000 in compensation for paternity fraud. Mason discovered that he could not have fathered his three grown up children after being diagnosed with cystic fibrosis, meaning he had been infertile since birth.

In 2021, a man from Kingston upon Hull who had already paid £38,000 in child maintenance payments discovered that he was not the father of the girl he had been led to believe was his daughter by his ex-girlfriend and had helped raise for 14 years. The Child Maintenance Service (CMS) agreed to suspend future payments, but still held him liable for his £2000 arrears. After public outcry and intervention from his local Member of Parliament (MP) Emma Hardy, the CMS reviewed the case and agreed to waive his arrears.

=== United States ===
The United States has historically imposed a strong presumption of paternity and has also imposed barriers to paternity challenges once paternity has been legally established. Since the advent of DNA testing, laws and guidelines have been proposed or enacted that may allow for a paternity challenge by a legal father who later determines he is not a child's biological father, or by a biological father who learns that somebody else has been named on a child's birth certificate as the child's father.

==== Georgia ====
Paternity fraud activist Carnell Smith has raised awareness about the problem of men paying child support for children that aren't theirs. He has successfully lobbied the Georgia state legislature to expand the time frame in which paternity tests could be administered.

Mandatory paternity testing is available in Georgia and is necessary in order to obtain a child support order in the state, the law differentiates between legitimacy and paternity and child support orders can only be ordered after a paternity test.

==== California ====
In the case of County of Los Angeles v. Navarro, in 1996, the County of Los Angeles entered a default judgment against putative father Mr. Navarro and ordered him to pay monthly support for Ms. Doe's two children. The complaint to establish paternity filed by the Bureau of Family Support Operations was based on information provided by Ms. Doe naming "Manuel Nava" as the children's father. The agency determined that Mr. Navarro was the father in question and delivered notice to his sister's residence, where Mr. Navarro was listed as "co-tenant," a notice Mr. Navarro denied ever receiving.

In 2001, Mr. Navarro, having undergone a DNA test showing he was not the children's father, sued the County of Los Angeles asking to be relieved from the support order. The County of Los Angeles opposed the motion, arguing the motion was filed after the six month limit to contest a default judgment and the mother's assertion that he was the father was insufficient to establish extrinsic fraud. The trial court sided with the county and denied the motion. This ruling was then appealed before the California 2nd Appellate Court of Appeal.

In 2004, the court of appeal reversed the trial court decision ruling in favor of Mr. Navarro and became the first published California case to hold that the statute of limitations did not apply in setting aside an old default judgment against a paternity fraud victim. Immediately after the ruling was issued, the Los Angeles County Child Support Services Department announced that it would request that the case be depublished so it could not be used as a precedent by other men in Mr. Navarro's situation. That request was later denied by the California Supreme Court.

In 2002, California Governor Gray Davis vetoed a proposed Paternity Justice Act, which would have provided more protection for victims of paternity fraud, citing that the bill could cost the state $40 million in federal funding. In 2004, California Governor Arnold Schwarzenegger signed into law AB 252, which allows men who prove they are not the biological father more resources to fight paying child support; the law expired in 2007.

==== Florida ====
In the case of Parker v. Parker, as part of their 2001 Florida divorce settlement, Mr. Parker was obliged to pay $1200 monthly child support based on Ms. Parker's representations to the court that Mr. Parker was the child's biological father. In 2003, Ms. Parker filed a motion for contempt and a petition to enforce child support against Mr. Parker which prompted a DNA test showing that Mr. Parker was not the child's biological father. The motion was 16 months after their divorce. Florida law (at that time) allowed the husband only 12 months to contest paternity following divorce. Mr. Parker's court-ordered payments would total about $216,000 over the next fifteen years.

Mr. Parker filed a petition for relief claiming that the misrepresentation of paternity had resulted in a fraudulent support order. This was dismissed by both the Trial Court and then, in 2005, the Court of Appeal as being intrinsic fraud and subject to the Florida one-year time limit to contest a dissolution decree, not extrinsic fraud, or a fraud upon the court, that can form the basis for relief from judgment more than a year later. This ruling was then appealed before the Florida Supreme Court who, in 2007, denied Mr. Parker's suit upholding the Fourth District Court of Appeal 2005 ruling.

During 2006, the Florida statutes changed, allowing a DNA test to be considered new evidence to contest a support order after the one-year time limit.

In its published opinion the Supreme Court Ruling in 2007 noted the change in Florida statutes, "which provides the circumstances and procedures under which a male may disestablish paternity and terminate a child support obligation"; however, the court decided not to consider the applicability of this new statute to Mr. Parker's circumstances, kicking the question of a retrial under the new law back to the Trial Courts.

Because the basic facts are little questioned and the case explores differences between extrinsic and intrinsic fraud, other state Supreme Courts, including Iowa and Tennessee, have cited Parker v. Parker when writing opinions of their own for paternity fraud type cases.

==== Iowa ====
In 2012, the Iowa Supreme Court in ruling to allow a paternity fraud tort to proceed as it "fits comfortably within the traditional boundaries of fraud law" and "It is supported by common law standards for fraud and is not contrary to public policy or the statutory policy of this state."

==== Tennessee ====
In the case of Hodge v. Craig in October 2012, intentional misrepresentation of paternity was recognized by a unanimous Tennessee Supreme Court where the mother intentionally lied to a man about who the father of the child was. Based on the mother's assurances the couple married but later divorced. The plaintiff paid child support, including medical insurance for the child. Based on physical differences between himself and the child, he obtained a tissue sample and confirmed his suspicions. Damages were awarded in compensation for child support paid for 15 years. The court's decision was based on the common law remedy of intentional misrepresentation; the court distinguished the award of damages from a retroactive modification of child support. The action was for damages; it was not a suit to disestablish paternity.

== See also ==
Medical

- DNA paternity testing
- Medical ethics
- DNA profiling
- Non-paternity event
- Genealogical DNA test
- Reproductive rights

Legal

- Equitable fatherhood
- Lord Mansfield's Rule
- Paternity (law)
- U.N. Convention on the Rights of the Child
- Reproductive coercion
- Putative father registry
- Sperm theft

Social

- Shared parenting
- Fathers' rights movement
