= English and Welsh bastardy laws =

Person whose parents were not married at the time of their birth

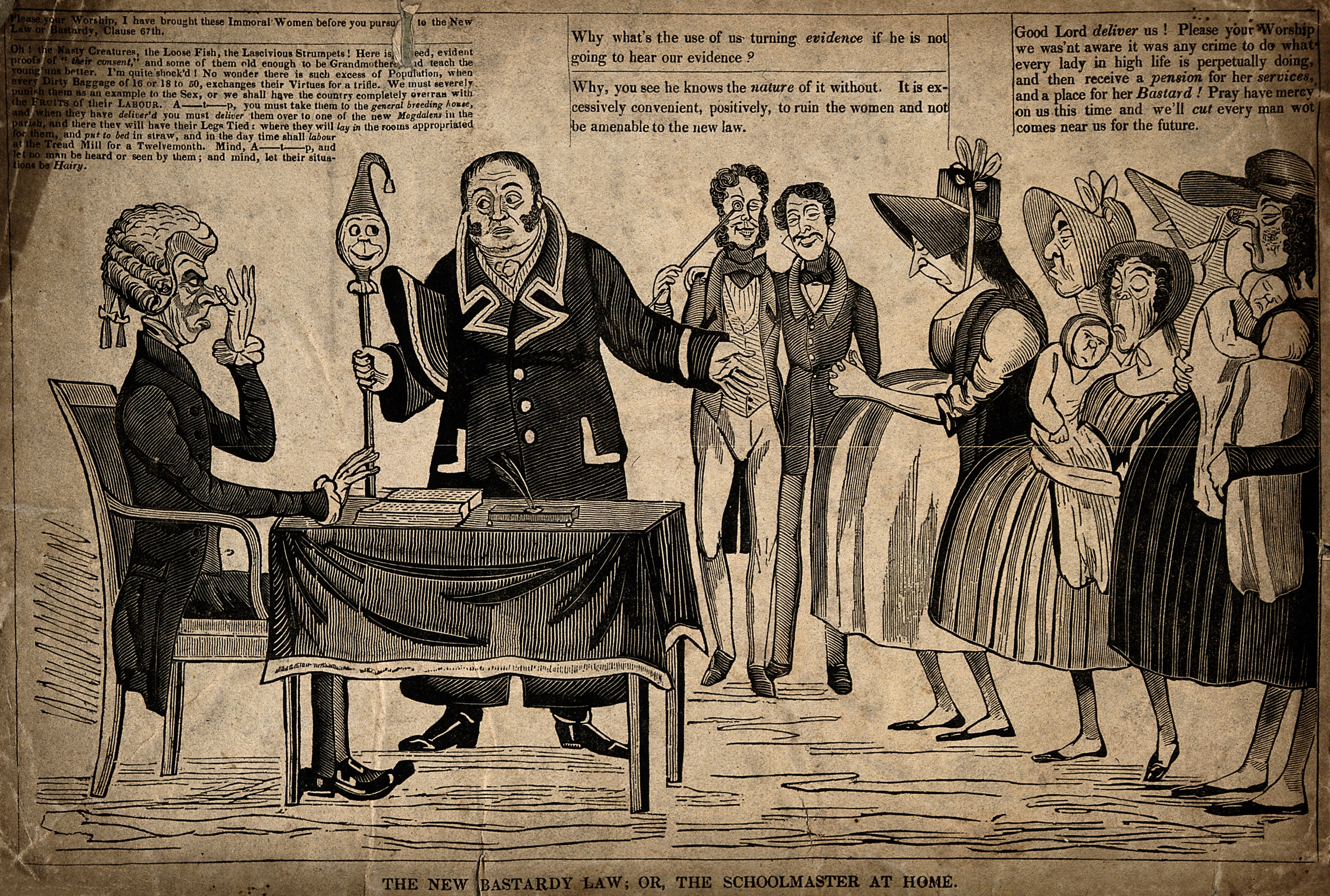
Woodcut showing a hearing

In the law of England and Wales, a bastard (also historically called whoreson, although both of these terms have largely dropped from common usage) is an illegitimate child, one whose parents were not married at the time of their birth. Until 1926, there was no possibility of post factum legitimisation of a bastard.

== Etymology ==
The word bastard is from the Old French bastard, which in turn was from Medieval Latin bastardus. In the modern French bâtard, the circumflex (â) merely represents the loss of the 's' over time. According to some sources, bastardus may have come from the word bastum, which means pack saddle, the connection possibly being the idea that a bastard might be the child of a passing traveller (who would have a pack saddle). In support of this is the Old French phrase fils de bast loosely meaning "child of the saddle", which had a similar meaning. A more defined possibility is that such a traveller was a member of the corps de bast, referring to the division of an army who arrived in town with their pack saddles the night before the troops, and left the day after, so that they may deal with all of the provisions of an army, and even do advanced scouting. This meant that for two days, they had unfettered access to all of the women in town, and were therefore the ones most likely to be the cause of the town's illegitimate offspring. (This explanation is apocryphal, but no attempt at dispute seems to have been proffered.)

== Common law origin ==
Bastardy was not a status, like villeinage, but the fact of being a bastard had a number of legal effects on an individual. One exception to the general principle that a bastard could not inherit occurred when the eldest son (who would otherwise be heir) was born a bastard but the second son was born after the parents were married.

The Provisions of Merton 1235 (20 Hen. 3 c. IX), otherwise known as the Special Bastardy Act 1235, provided that except in the case of real actions the fact of bastardy could be proved by trial by jury, rather than necessitating a bishop's certificate.

== Reform ==
Post-hoc legitimisation was introduced under the Legitimacy Act 1926 (16 & 17 Geo. 5 c. 60) and the Family Law Reform Act 1969 (c. 46) allowed a bastard to inherit on the intestacy of his parents.

== In Medieval Wales ==
In Medieval Wales, prior to its conquest by and incorporation in England, a "bastard" was defined solely as a child not acknowledged by their father. All children acknowledged by a father, whether born in or out of wedlock, had equal legal rights including the right to share in the father's inheritance. This legal difference between Wales and England is often referred to in the well-known "Brother Cadfael" series of Medieval detective mysteries.

== See also ==
- Colonial American bastardy laws
- Illegitimacy
- Legitimacy law in England and Wales
- Abortion in the United Kingdom
