= Judah P. Benjamin Confederate Memorial at Gamble Plantation Historic State Park =

Florida State Park in Ellenton, Florida

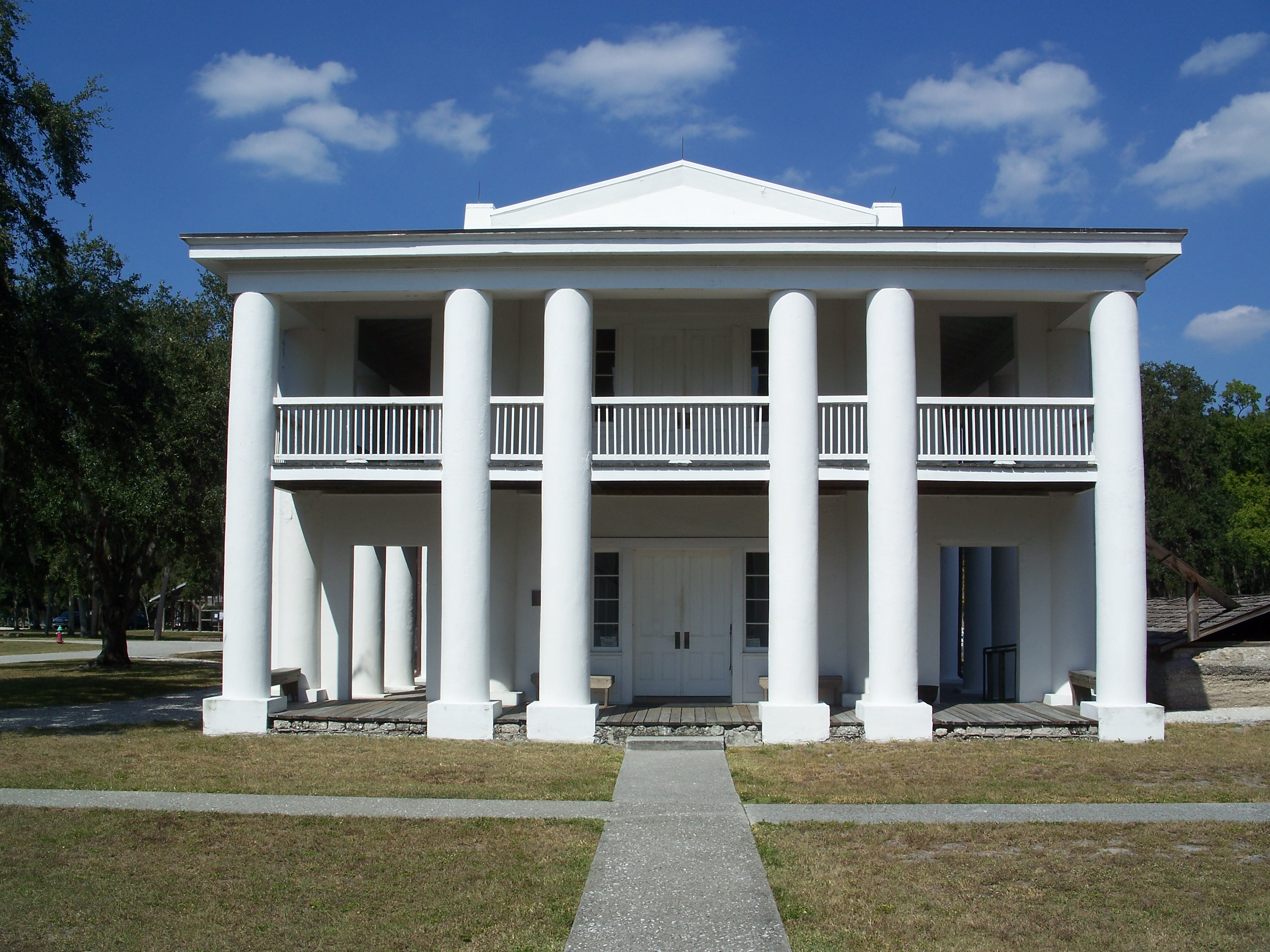
- A view from in front of the Gamble Mansion

- Location within Florida Location within the United States
- Interactive map of Judah P. Benjamin Confederate Memorial at Gamble Plantation Historic State Park
- Location: Ellenton, Florida, USA
- Coordinates: 27.5222°N 82.5266°W
- Governing body: Florida Department of Environmental Protection
- Robert Gamble House
- U.S. National Register of Historic Places
- Built: 1845–1850
- Architectural style: Greek Revival Vernacular
- NRHP reference No.: 70000189
- Added to NRHP: August 12, 1970

The Judah P. Benjamin Confederate Memorial at Gamble Plantation Historic State Park, also known as the Gamble Mansion or Gamble Plantation, is a Florida State Park, located in Ellenton, Florida, on 37th Avenue East and US 301. It is home to the Florida Division United Daughters of the Confederacy (UDC).

The park consists of the antebellum mansion developed by its first owner, Major Robert Gamble; a 40,000-gallon cistern to provide the household with fresh water; and 16 acres (65,000 m^{2}) of the former sugarcane plantation. At the height of operation, the forced-labor farm included 3,500 acres, and Gamble likely enslaved more than 200 people to work the property and process the sugarcane.

The mansion was listed on the National Register of Historic Places as the Robert Gamble House on August 12, 1970. Its columns and two-foot-thick walls are constructed of tabby, a regional material developed as a substitute for brick.

The park also includes the restored wood-frame, two-story, Victorian-style Patten House, built in 1872 for owner George Patten.

In 1925, the mansion and grounds were purchased by the United Daughters of the Confederacy and donated to the state as a memorial to Judah P. Benjamin, who served in three Cabinet positions under Confederate President Jefferson Davis during the American Civil War. He stayed at the plantation in May 1865, before fleeing from the Union forces and sailing to England, where he had a second career.

The Gamble Mansion serves as home to the Florida Division UDC. In 1937, the UDC installed a memorial plaque to Benjamin at the mansion. Also on the grounds is the Confederate Veterans Memorial Monument, erected October 10, 1937.

In 2002, the State of Florida acquired the property that holds the ruins of the plantation's sugar mill, one of the South's largest, and added it to the historic park complex.

On April 18, 2012, the AIA's Florida Chapter placed the Gamble Mansion #76 on its list, Florida Architecture: 100 Years. 100 Places.

== History ==
The coastal area was inhabited for thousands of years by varying cultures of indigenous peoples, who left huge shell middens as evidence of their reliance on seafood. Historic tribes in this area included the prehistoric Tocobaga, and during the colonial period Yamasee, Creek, Seminole and Miccosukee.

At the close of the Second Seminole War in 1842, the United States opened the central and southern Florida frontier to settlement by Americans. Major Robert E. Gamble III (b. 1813 in Virginia, d. 1906 in Tallahassee, FL), who had served as aide-de-camp to Florida Territorial Governor Richard Keith Call and led troops at the Battles of the Withlacoochee and Wahoo Swamp, received 160 acres for homesteading under the Armed Occupation Act, and arrived at the Manatee River site in 1844. Other sugar planters from northern Florida and established slave states soon joined him along the rich Manatee River on the western coast of today's central Florida. The sugar planters enslaved many people to clear the lands; plant, harvest and process sugarcane; and build the plantation houses, mills, and outbuildings. By 1845, a dozen plantations along the riverfront were producing for the New Orleans market. The planters shipped their commodity crops downriver and across the Gulf of Mexico to the international port.

The Gamble Mansion was built principally by enslaved people, both laborers and artisans, using local materials over the course of five to six years. The mansion is an outstanding example of antebellum construction in the Greek Revival architectural style. The mansion's columns and two-foot-thick walls are made of tabby, a unique type of concrete first used by Spanish and English settlers on the Atlantic coast and Sea Islands as an alternative to clay bricks, which could not be produced due to a lack of clay in the coastal soil. Techniques for making tabby were brought to Florida by European-American planters and the African-American people they enslaved (see Kingsley Plantation). The workers created the material by mixing lime (extracted by burning crushed oyster shells), more crushed oyster shells, sand, and water. The mixture was poured into molds for hardening, and the finished product was used in the same manner as bricks. Ample supplies of oyster shells were found in middens present on the sites of former Paleo-Indian coastal villages. The mansion construction was managed by Asa J. Goddard, a "Master Workman" who in 1843 had settled on the northside of the Manatee River, just north of the present-day site of the city of Palmetto.

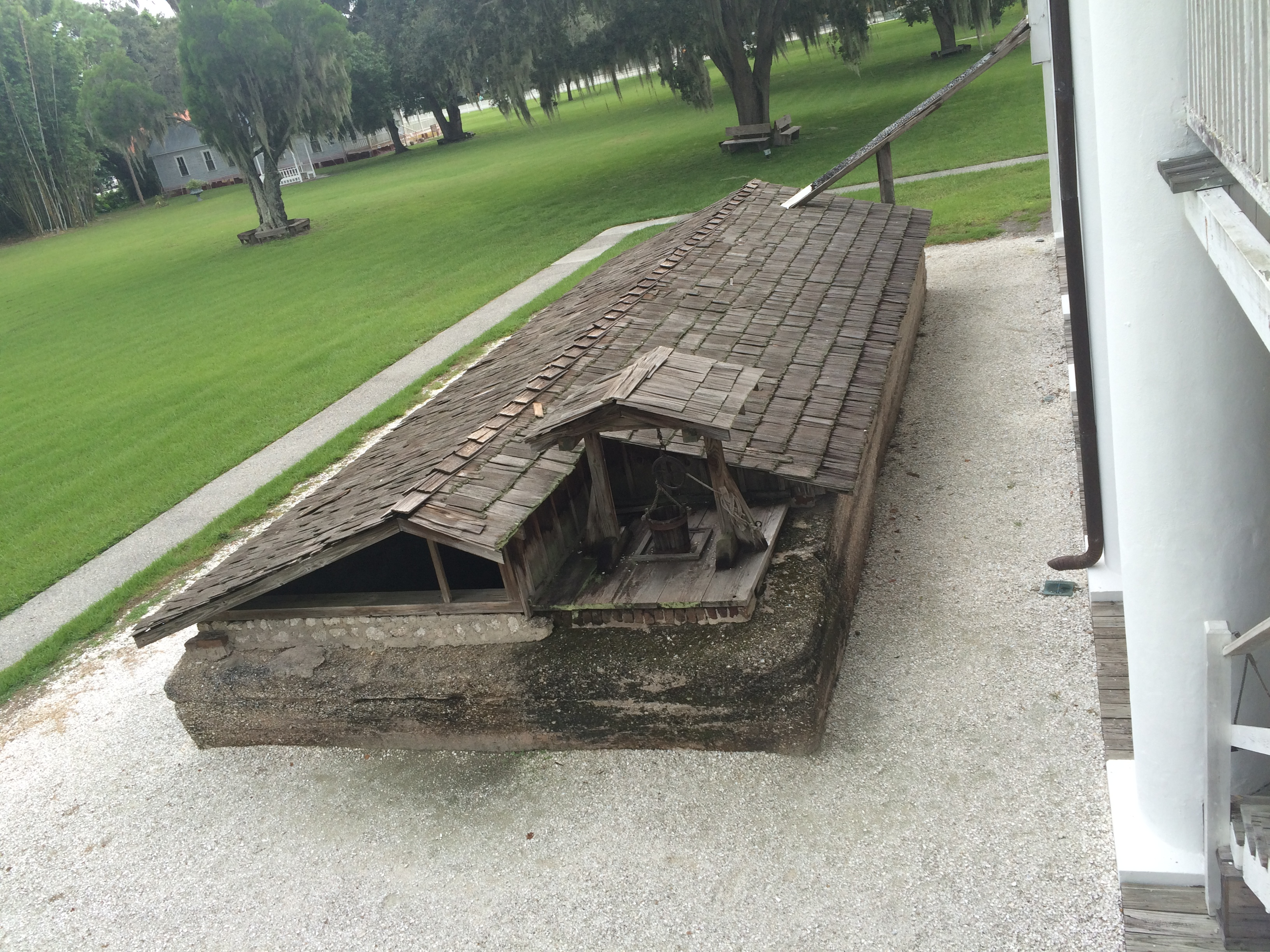
Covered cistern, Gamble Plantation

Next to the house is a covered, 40,000-gallon cistern with a wood-shake roof, which Gamble had built to supply the household's fresh water needs. Fish were kept in the cistern to eat insects and help keep the water clean.

Gamble lived in the mansion and used it as the headquarters of his extensive sugar plantation. By 1850, he had hired an overseer, 30-year-old David Lanner from Georgia. That year on the US Census, Gamble declared his real estate to be worth $19,000. He enslaved a total of 62 people. From starting with 160 acres, he rapidly acquired 3,500 acres. In addition to the mansion, he directed the construction of numerous outbuildings and slave quarters (also constructed of tabby), and the wharf from which sugar and molasses were shipped by schooner and steamboat. Likely more than 200 slaves lived and worked at the plantation at its productive peak. However, due to a declining sugar market and debts, Gamble had to sell the property in 1856. The Gamble Mansion is the only surviving plantation house in peninsular Florida.

During the Civil War, the mansion was occupied by Captain Archibald McNeill, a famous Confederate blockade runner. Judah P. Benjamin, Confederate Secretary of State, took refuge here during May 1865 while making his escape from Federal troops following defeat of the Confederacy. He had been accused of having arranged for U.S. President Lincoln's assassination in April 1865, and feared being unable to get a fair trial after the war. McNeill aided Benjamin in his escape to the Bahamas by recommending two "good men to carry him out" Captain Frederick Tresca and Hiram McLeod.

The Gamble sugar mill, one of the antebellum era's largest, was destroyed by Union raiders in 1864. The brick ruins are located one-half mile to the north on State Road 683. The State of Florida acquired the mill property in 2002; it has cleared overgrown vegetation at the site to make the mill ruins visible, while protecting them with a fence.

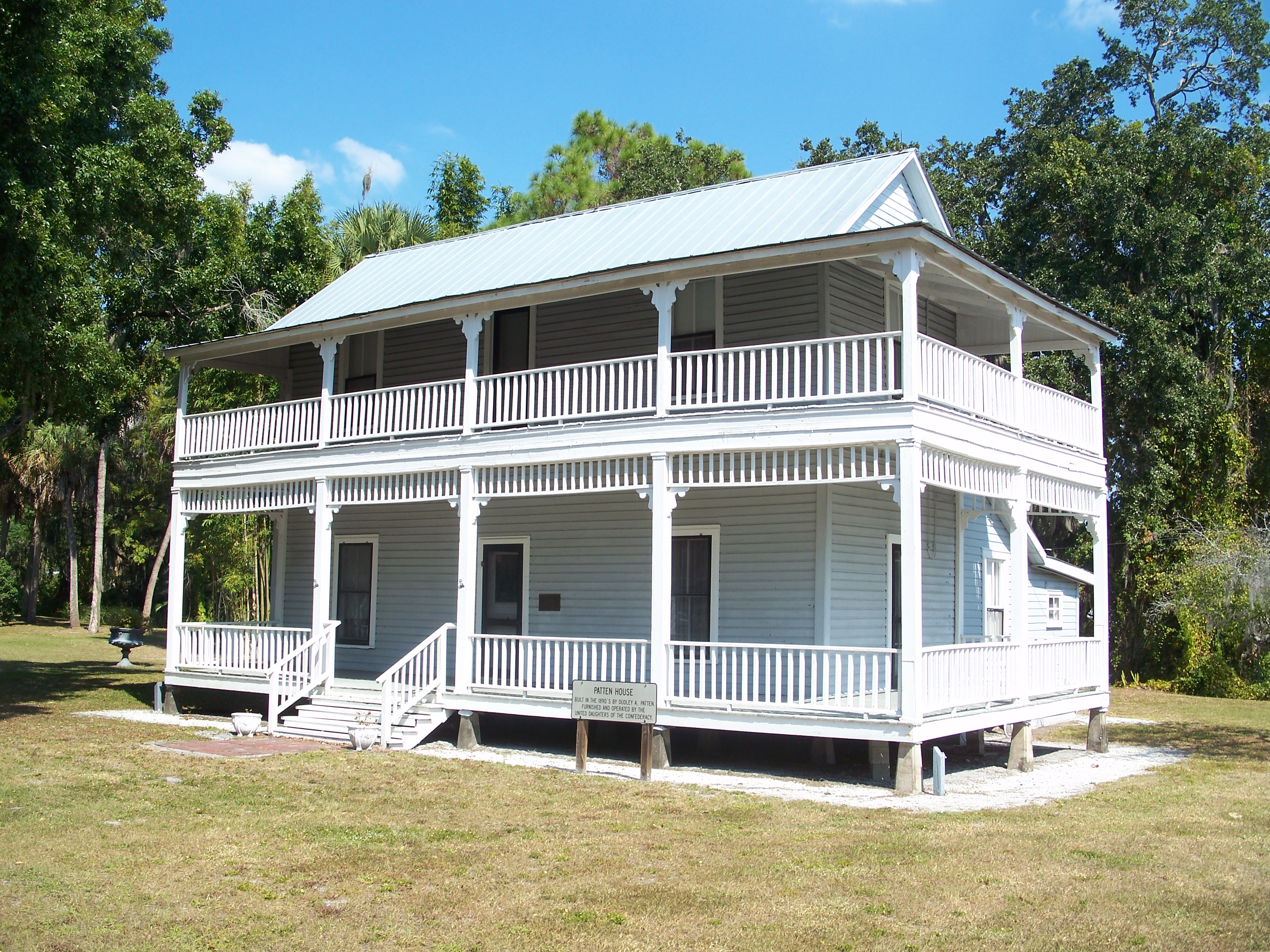
Patten House, built 1872 (photo, 2010)

In 1895, the postbellum owner, George Patten's youngest son Dudley Patten, built a wooden, two-story vernacular Victorian style house for his young family. (Patten's wife, Ada Melville Turner Patten is said to have demanded a modern home after the couple who were married in 1891, had been living for several years in the old mansion with Patten's widowed mother.) The state has restored the Patten House, which is also part of the plantation park complex. But, in 2014, termite and water damage proved to cause concern for visitor's safety, so the house was closed to the public. Talk of demolition caused community members to stand for renovation, which was approved and begun in 2016. By December 2017, the contractors realized damage was more extensive than once believed, and asked the State of Florida for more money. The decision was made, once more, to demolish the home. Fortunately, the community outcry once more appears to have saved the home from this permanent solution to a temporary problem. The Patten House was nominated and has been selected as one of Florida's 11 to Save for 2018 by the Florida Trust for Historic Preservation. The announcement was made on May 17, 2018. The 11 to Save program is designed to increase the public's awareness of the urgent need to save Florida's historic resources, and to empower local preservationists and preservation groups in their efforts to preserve Florida's history.

Tabby is a less permanent construction material than brick; and by 1902, the house and columns were deteriorating badly. In 1923 the Judah P. Benjamin Chapter of the United Daughters of the Confederacy (UDC) began to raise money to rescue the home from destruction. By 1925 they had bought the house and 16 acres; they donated the property to the state for preservation as a memorial to Judah Benjamin. The state completed restoration of the house in 1927. The UDC arranged in 1937 for the installation of a memorial plaque to honor the service of Judah Philip Benjamin to the Confederacy. He served as Attorney General, Secretary of War, and Secretary of State to President Jefferson Davis. Today, the mansion is furnished in the style of a successful mid-19th century plantation home.

In January 2010, Janet Snyder Matthews, a historian at the University of Florida and the former associate director of the National Park Service, led a working seminar at the plantation. Her goal was for students to develop scholarly documentation on the plantation and its occupants, with a goal of upgrading the plantation's historic designation to reflect its significance, perhaps to that of a National Historic Landmark.

== Recreational activities ==
The park is open from 8 a.m. to sundown, 365 days per year, and guided tours of Gamble Mansion are available.

== Gallery ==
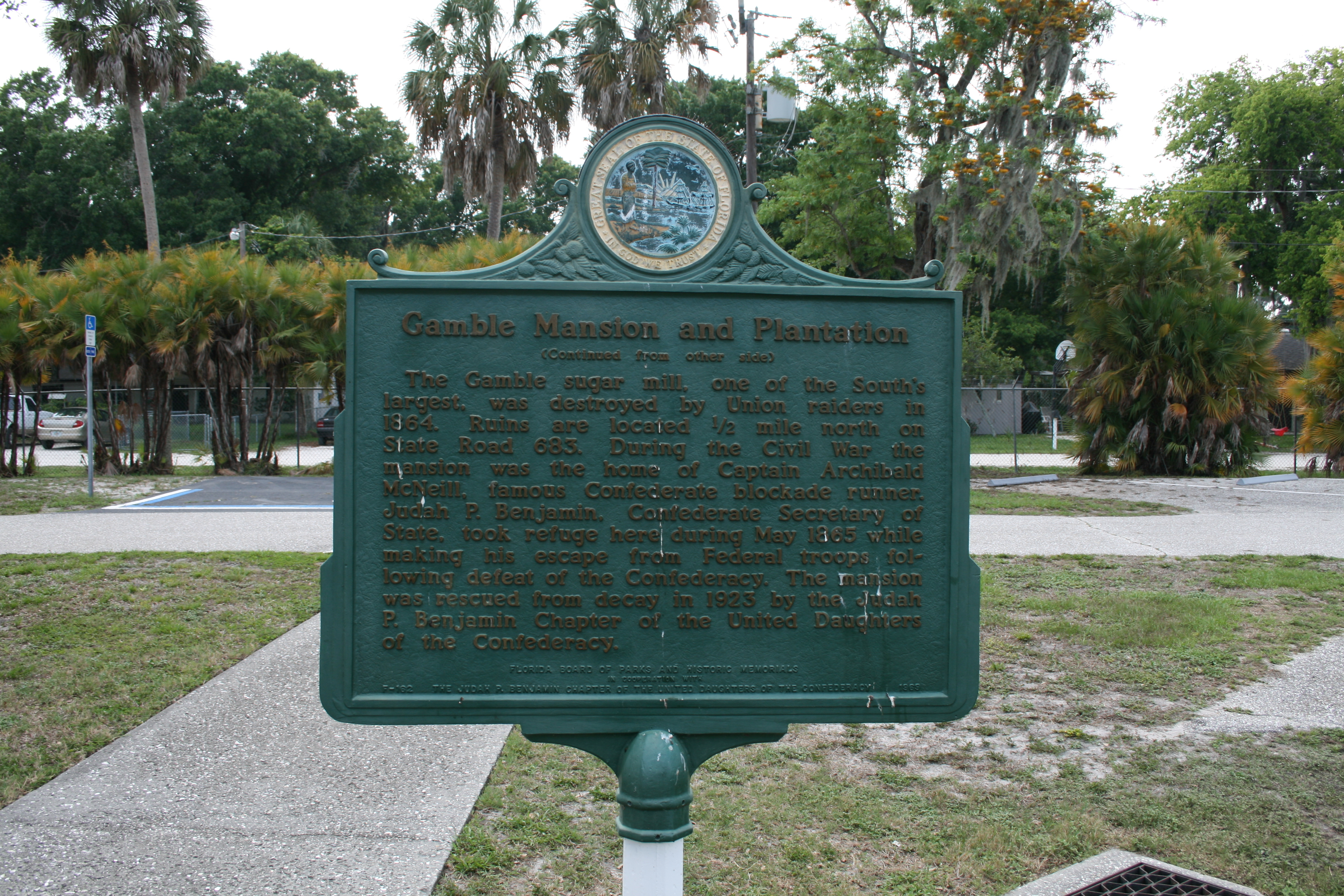
Gamble Mansion, state historical plaque

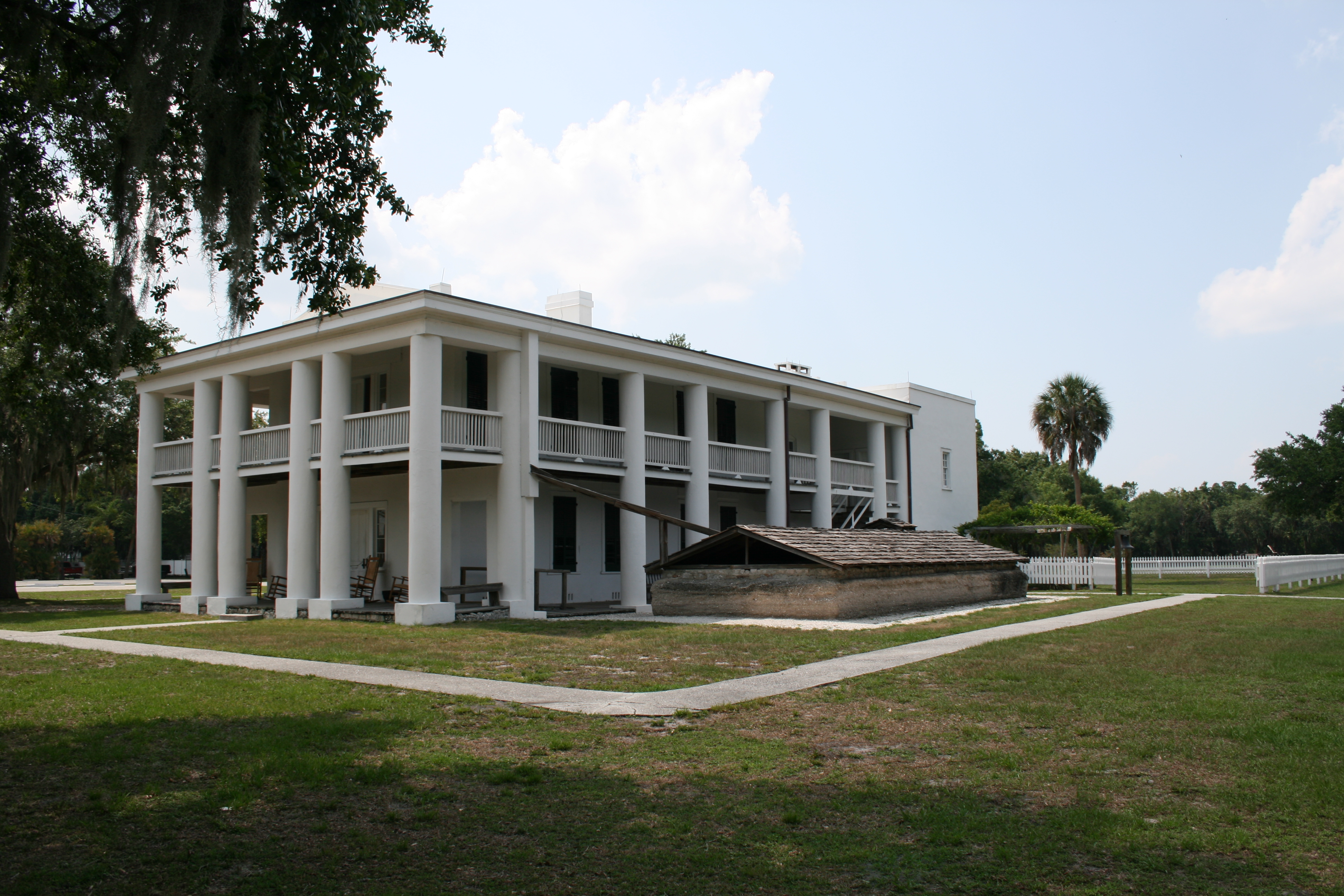
Gamble Mansion, side view with 40,000-gal. covered cistern

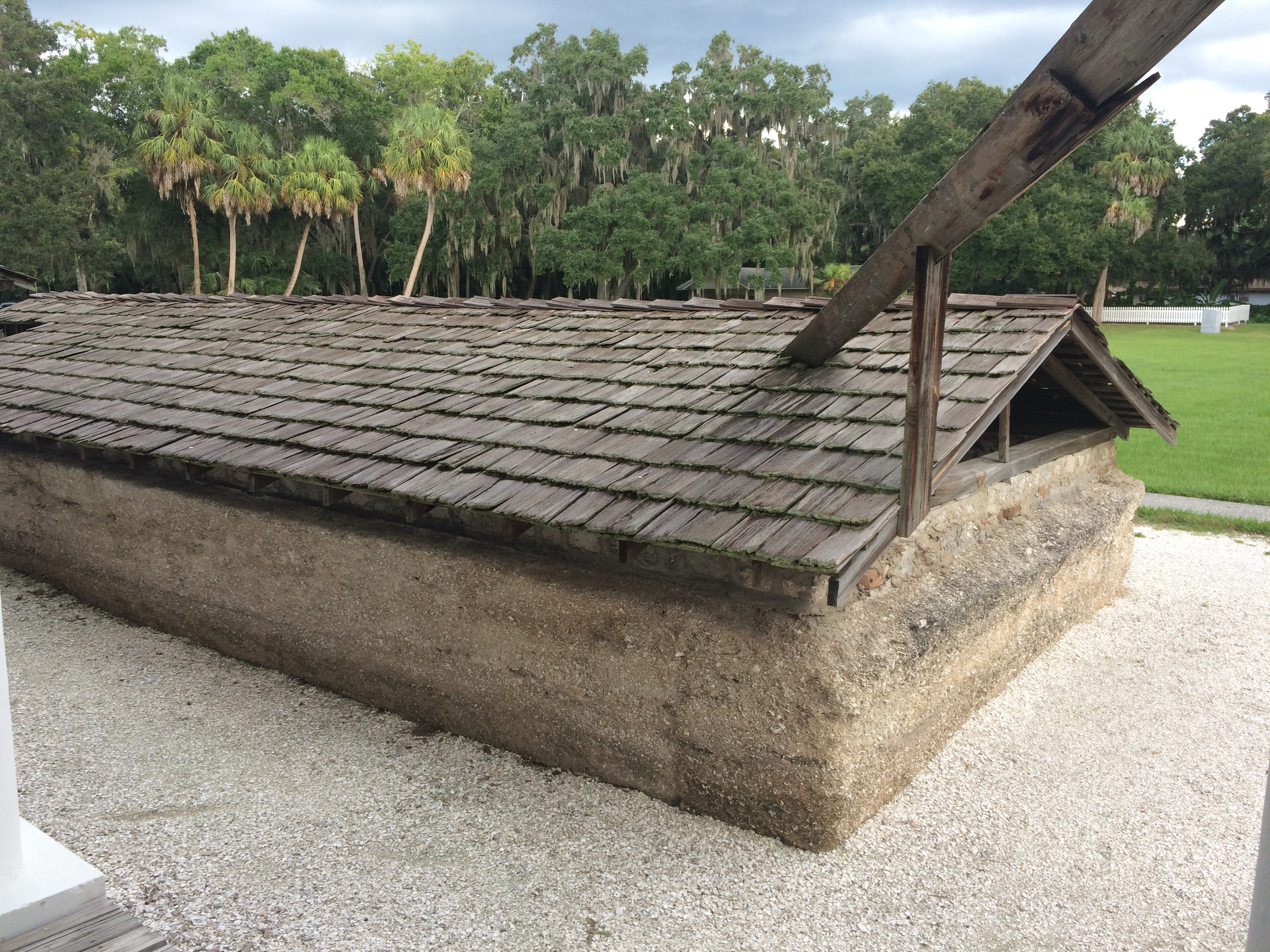
Covered cistern, Gamble Mansion

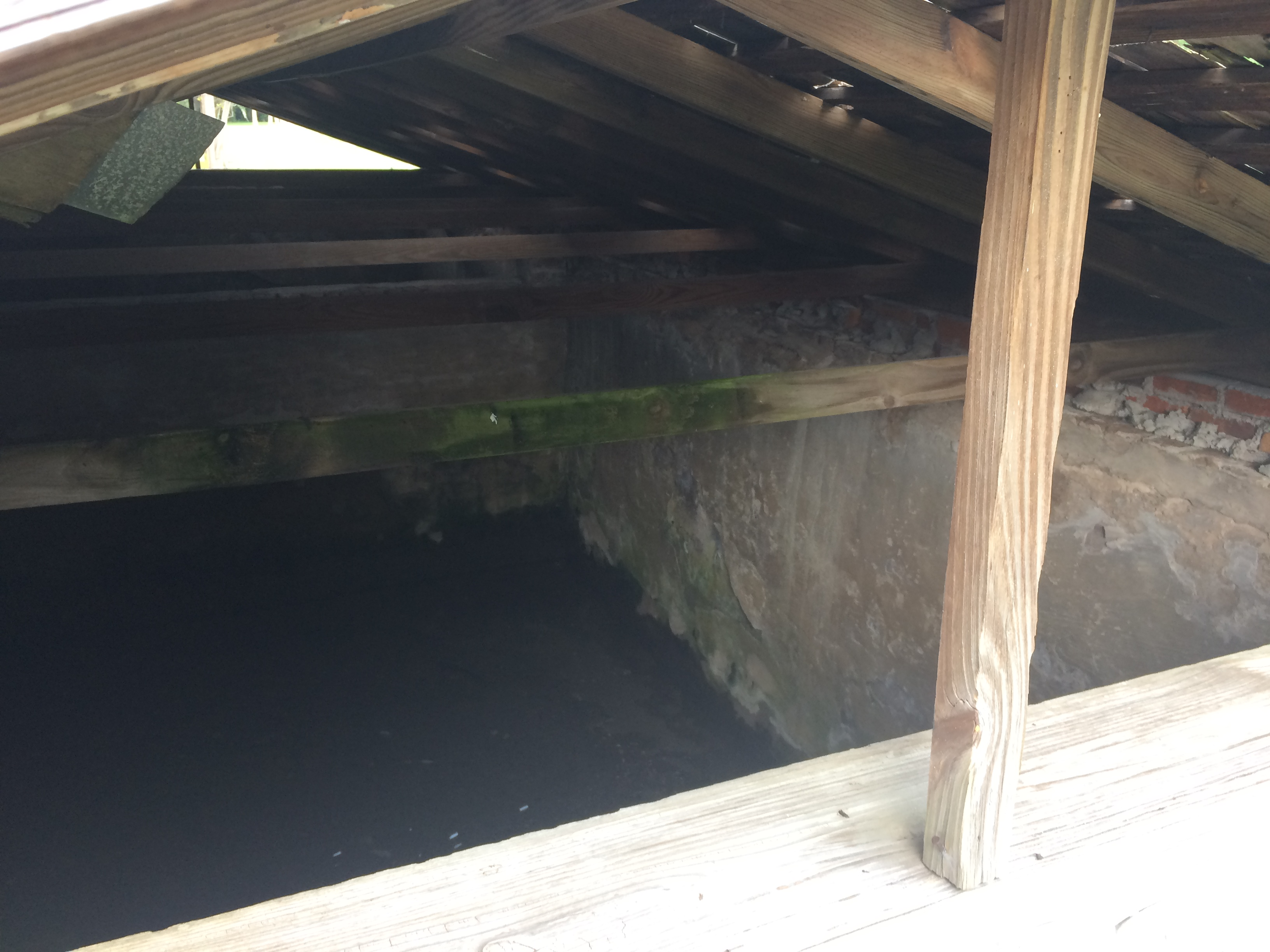
Covered cistern (interior), Gamble Mansion

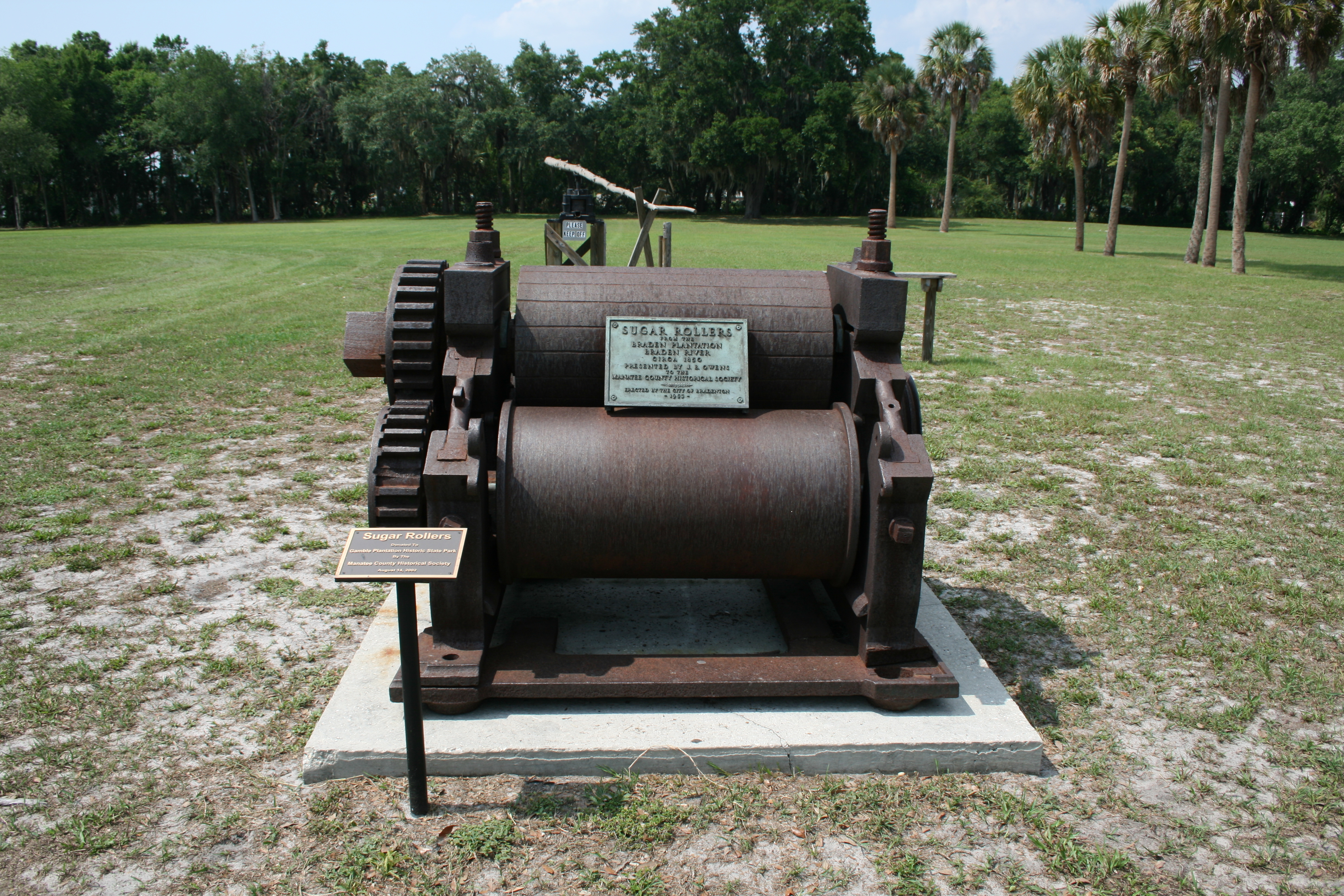
Sugar rollers, Gamble Mansion

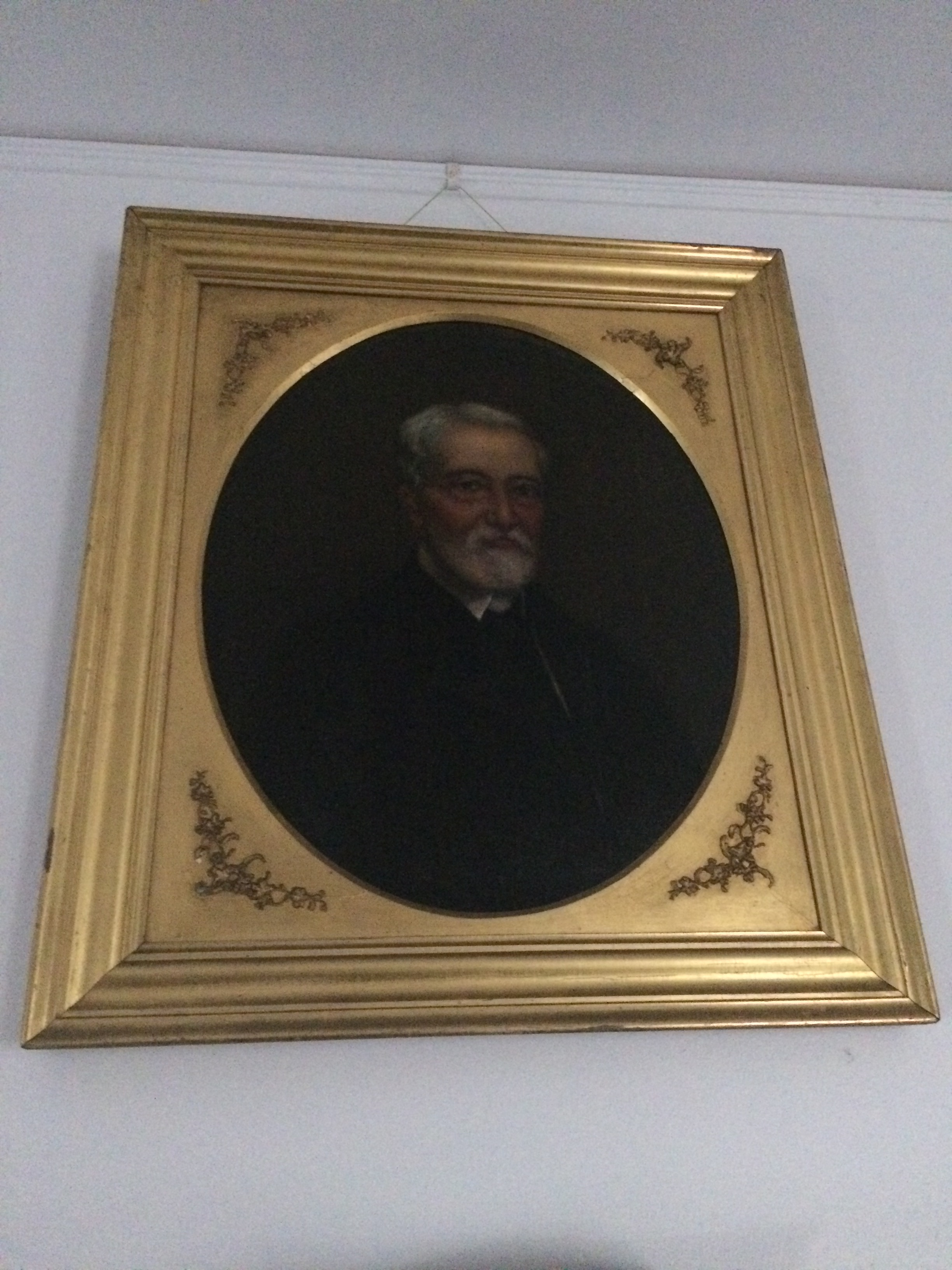
Portrait of Major Robert Gamble, Gamble Mansion

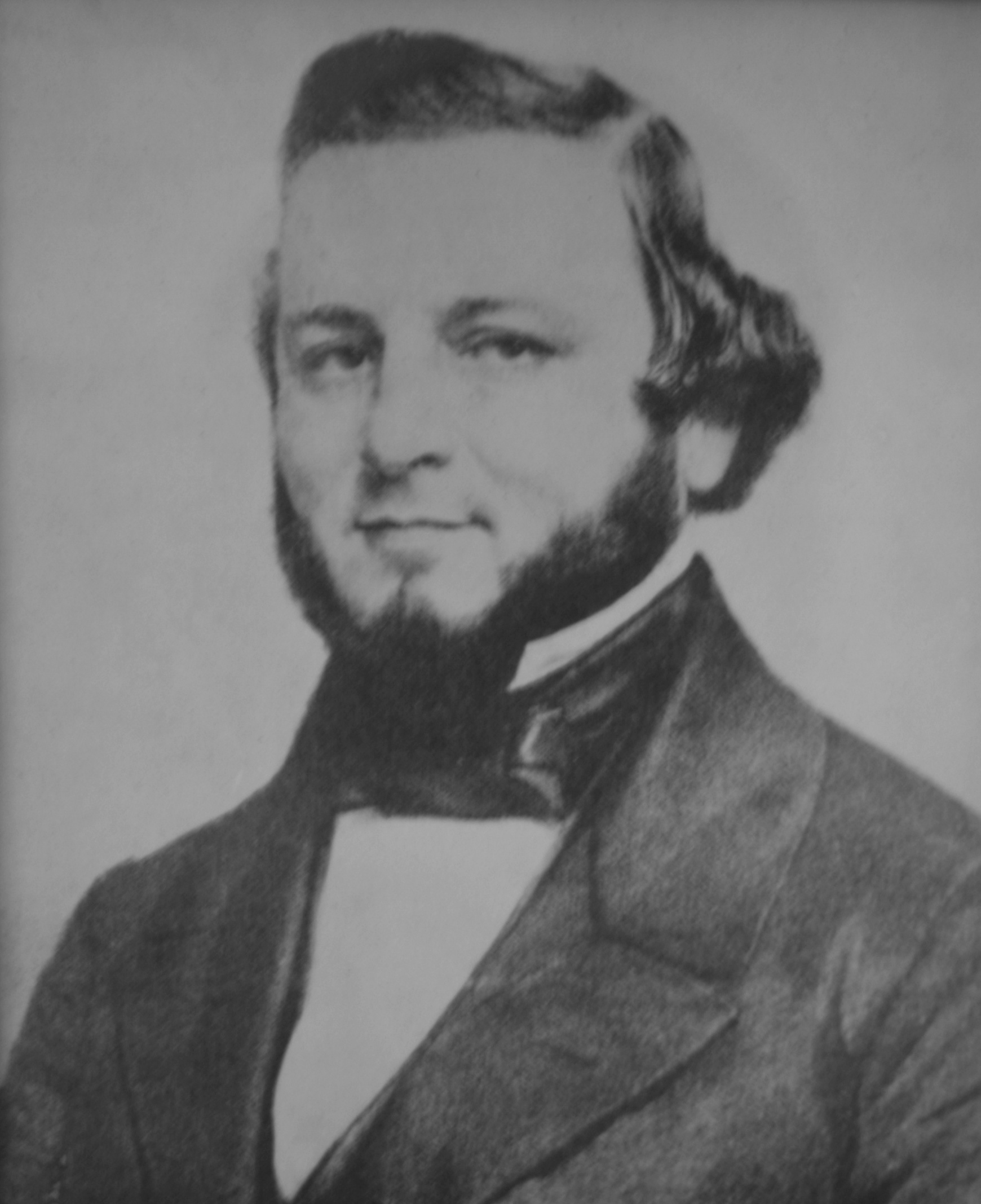
Judah P. Benjamin, Confederate Secretary of State

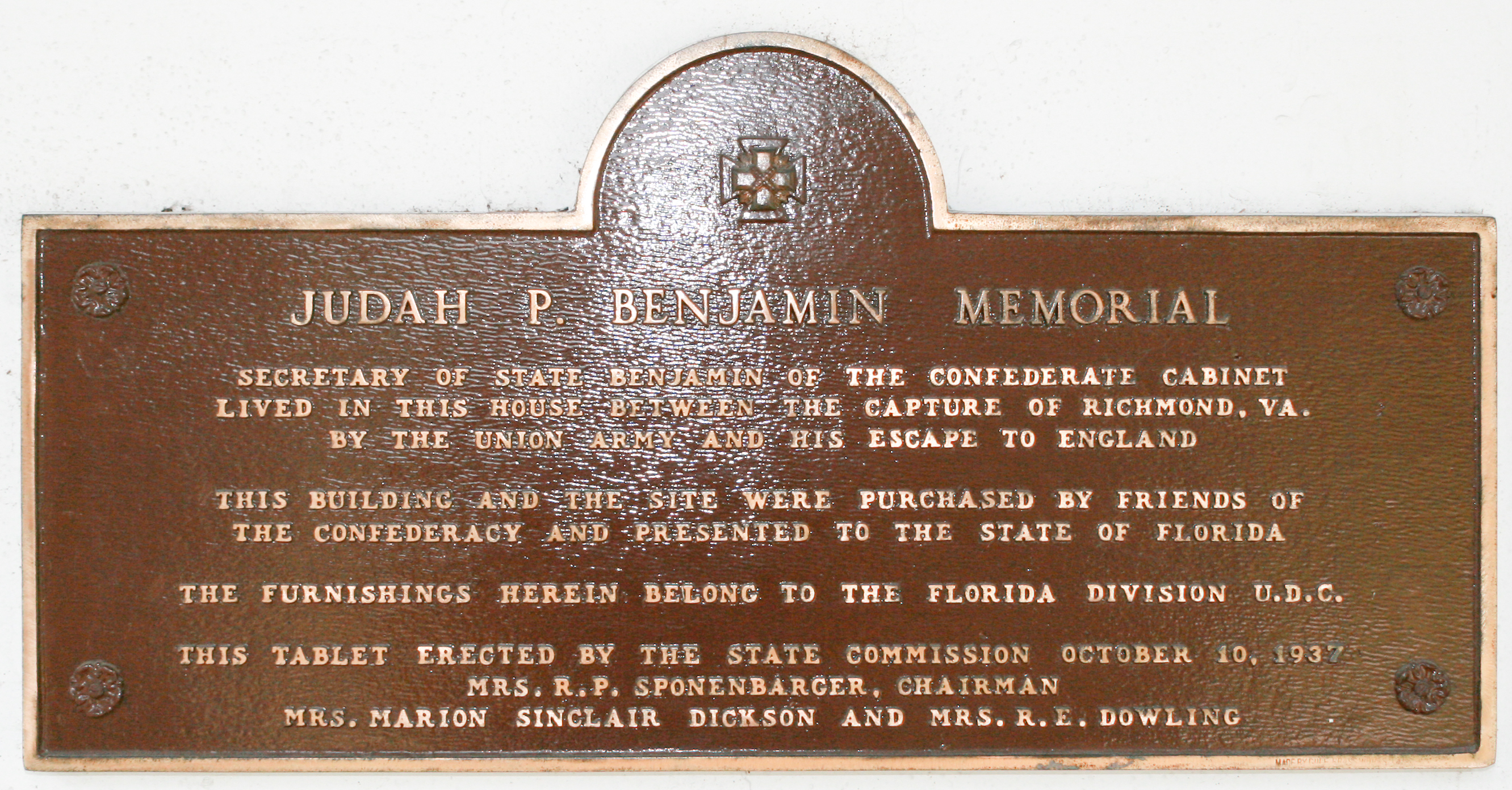
Judah P. Benjamin, UDC Memorial plaque

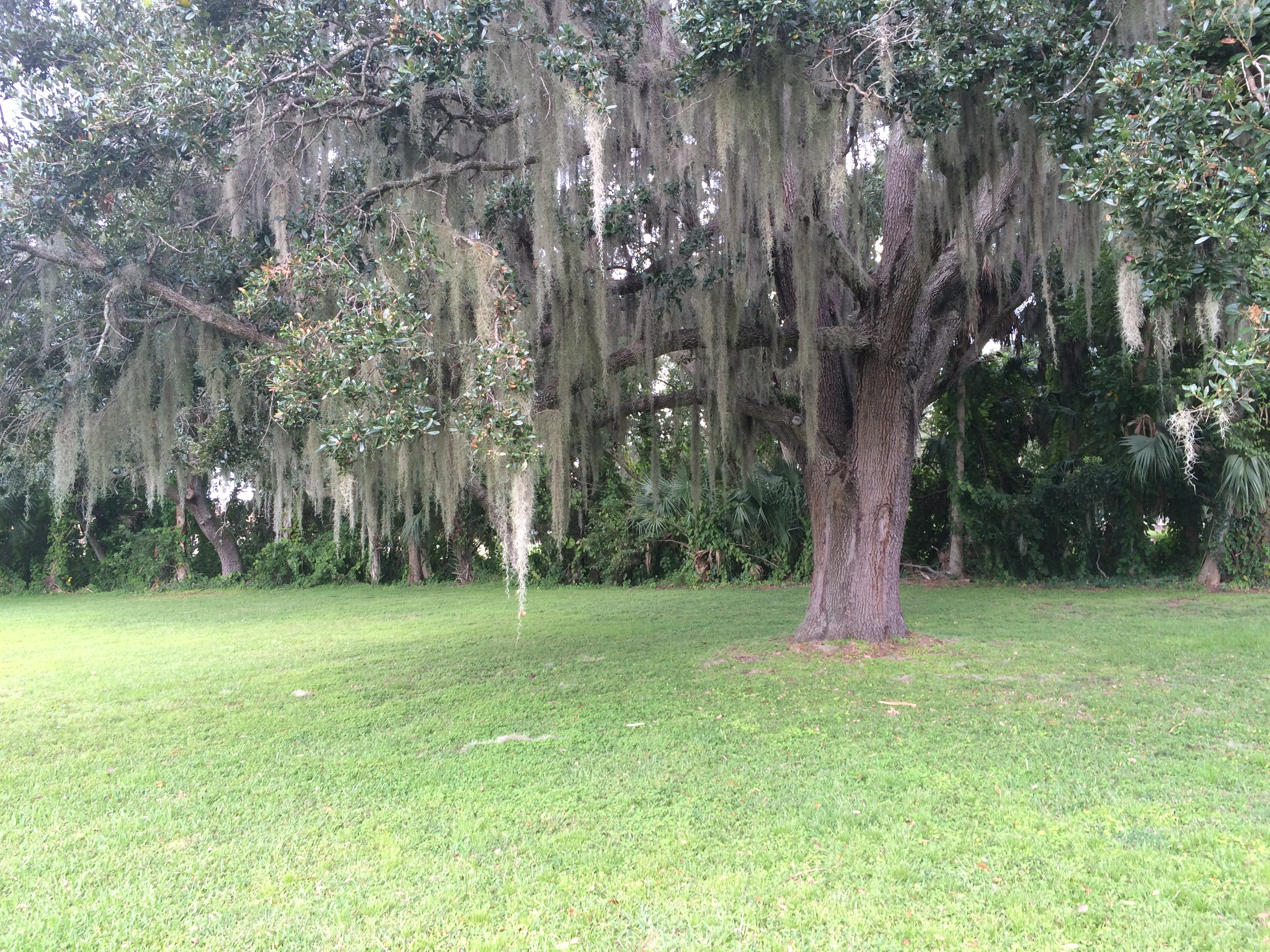
Approximate site of the slave quarters, Gamble Plantation

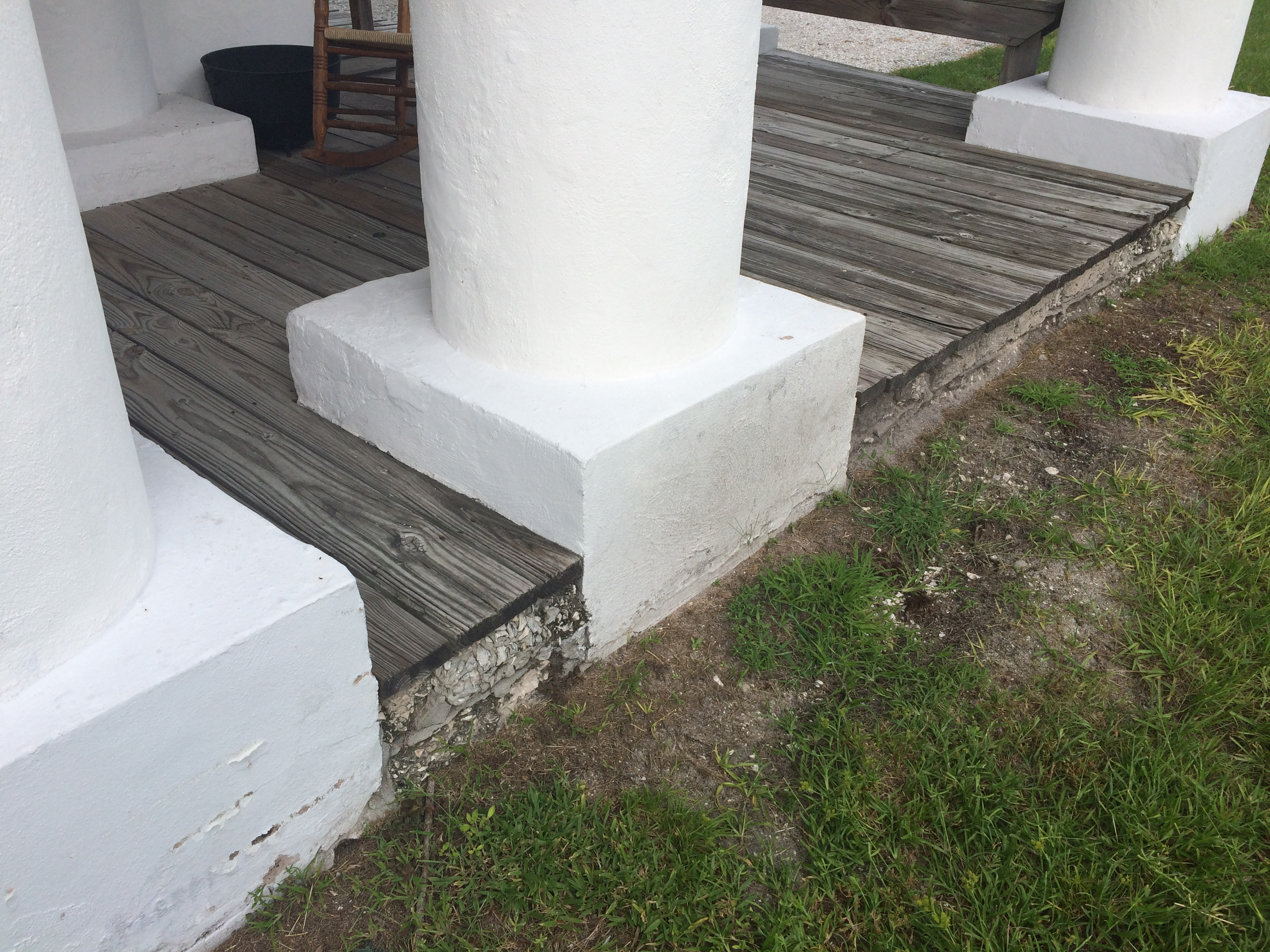
Tabby Columns, Gamble Mansion

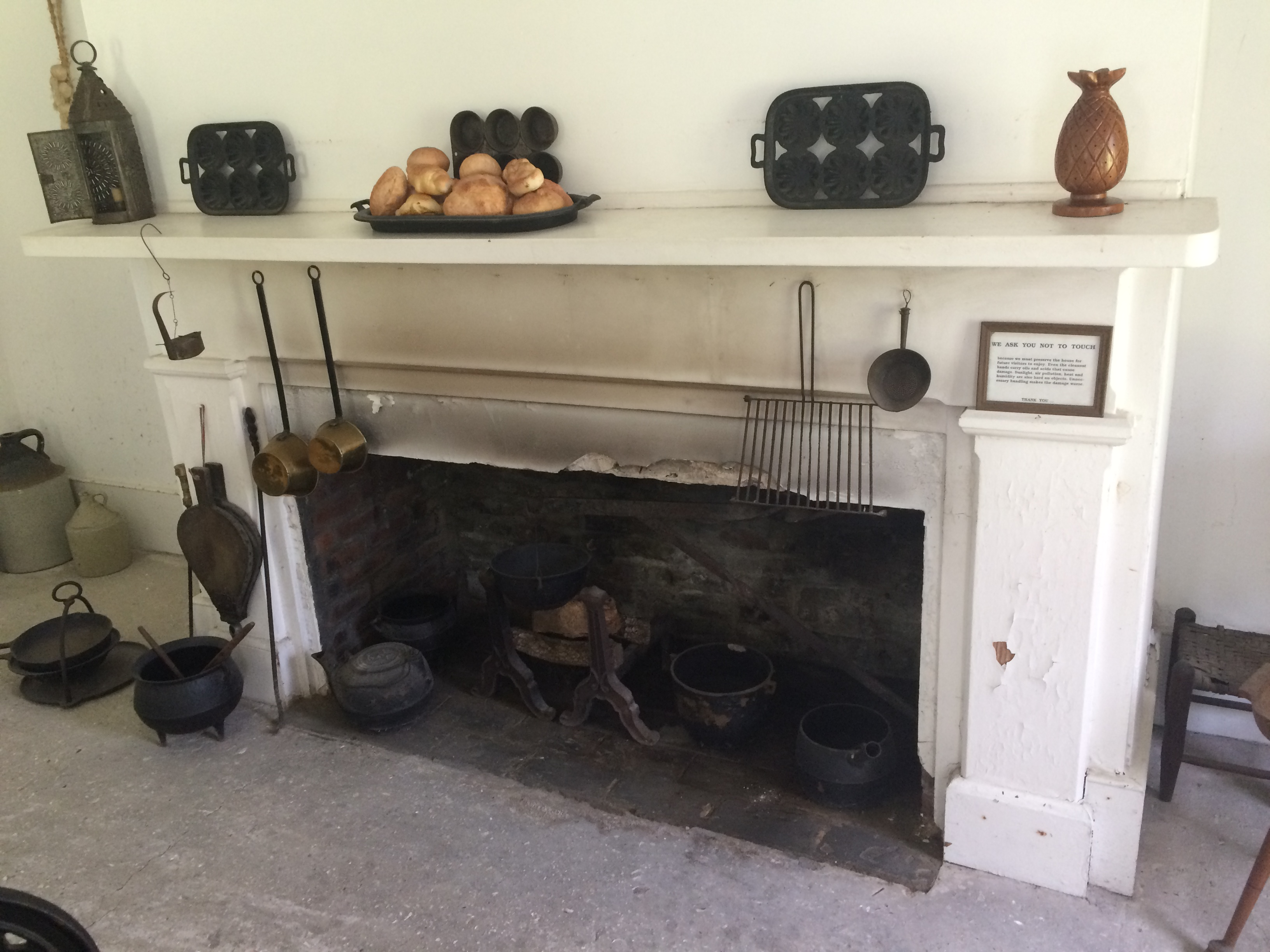
Kitchen hearth, Gamble Mansion

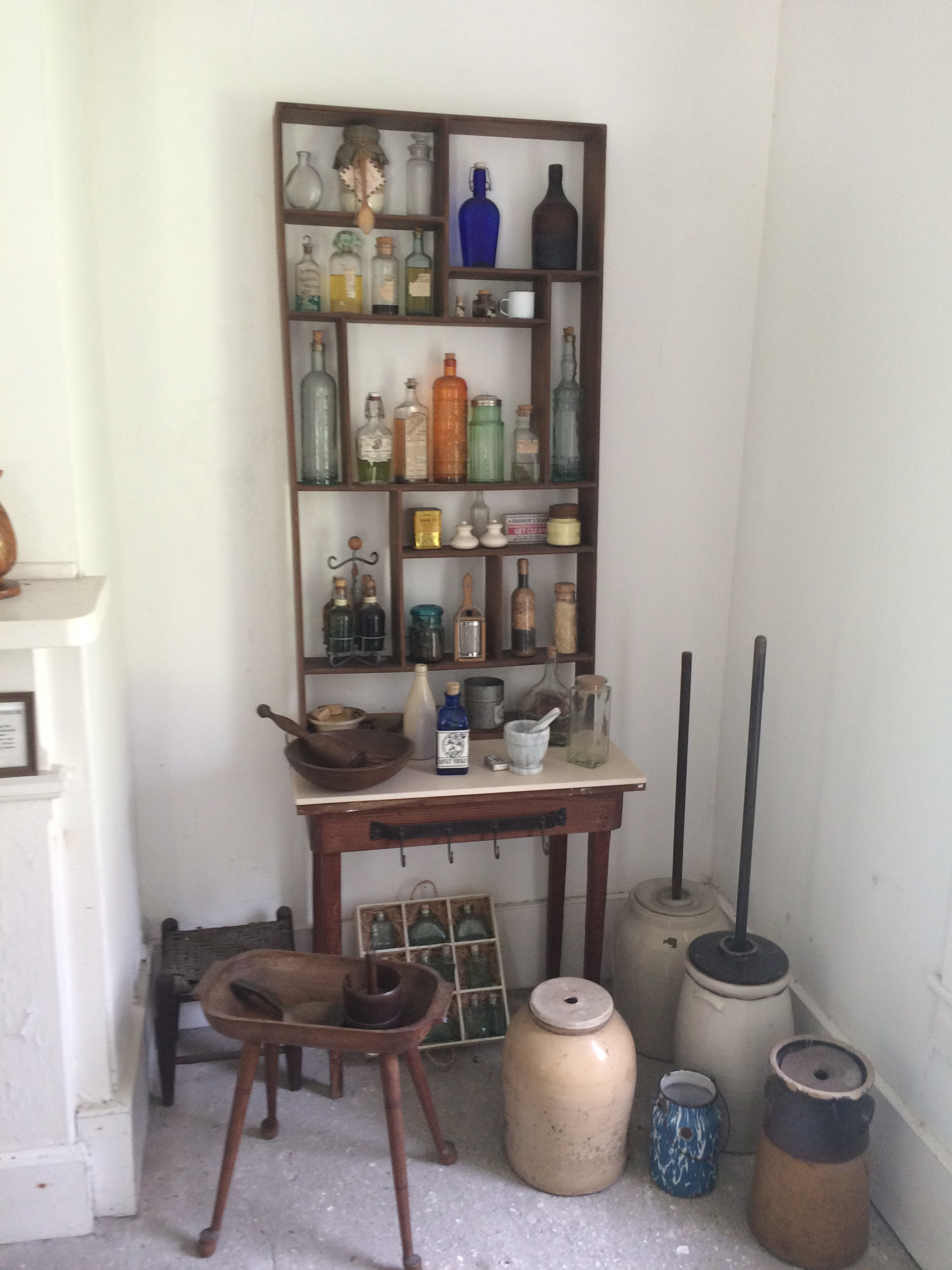
Kitchen items, Gamble Mansion

== See also ==
- National Register of Historic Places listings in Manatee County, Florida
- List of Confederate monuments and memorials
