= Judah P. Benjamin =

American politician and lawyer (1811–1884)

Judah Phillip Benjamin QC
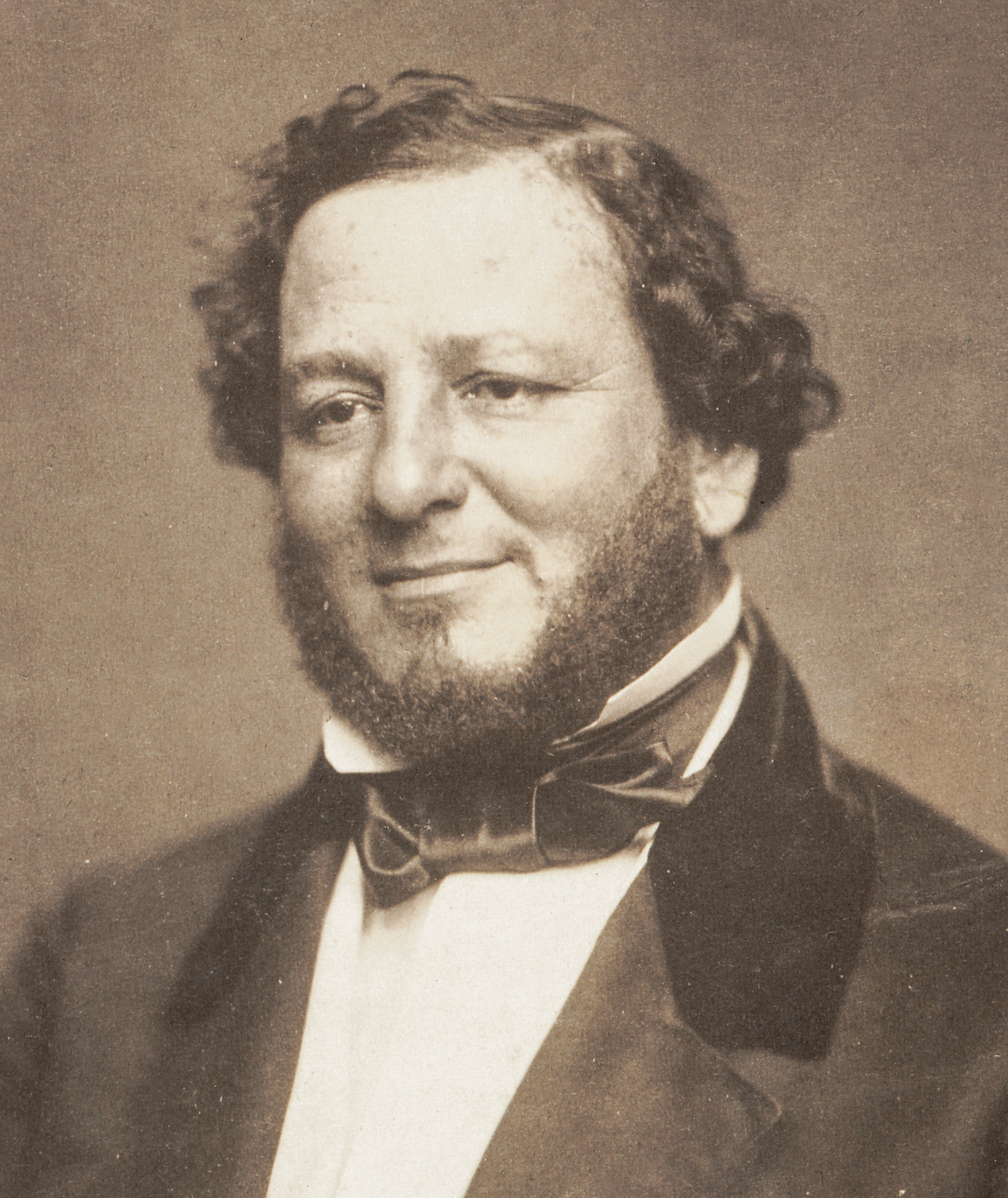
- Benjamin, c. 1856

3rd Confederate States Secretary of State
- In office March 18, 1862 – May 10, 1865
- President: Jefferson Davis
- Preceded by: William Browne (acting)
- Succeeded by: Position abolished

2nd Confederate States Secretary of War
- In office September 17, 1861 – March 24, 1862
- President: Jefferson Davis
- Preceded by: LeRoy Walker
- Succeeded by: George Randolph

1st Confederate States Attorney General
- In office February 25, 1861 – November 15, 1861
- President: Jefferson Davis
- Preceded by: Position established
- Succeeded by: Wade Keyes (acting)

United States Senator from Louisiana
- In office March 4, 1853 – February 4, 1861
- Preceded by: Solomon Downs
- Succeeded by: John Harris (1868)

Personal details
- Born: Judah Phillip Benjamin; August 6, 1811 Christiansted, Danish West Indies
- Died: May 6, 1884 (aged 72) Paris, France
- Resting place: Père Lachaise Cemetery
- Party: Whig (before 1856); Democratic (from 1856)
- Spouse: Natalie Bauché de St. Martin (m. 1833)
- Children: 1
- Education: Yale College; Lincoln's Inn

Judah Philip Benjamin QC (August 6, 1811 – May 6, 1884) was a lawyer and politician who served as a United States senator from Louisiana, a member of the Confederate States Cabinet and, after his escape to Britain at the end of the American Civil War, an English barrister. Benjamin was the first Jew to hold a Cabinet position in North America and the first to be elected to the United States Senate who had not renounced his faith.

Benjamin was born to Sephardic Jewish parents from London who had moved to Saint Croix in the Danish West Indies when it was occupied by Britain during the Napoleonic Wars. Seeking greater opportunities, his family immigrated to the United States, eventually settling in Charleston, South Carolina. Benjamin attended Yale College but left without graduating. He moved to New Orleans, where he read law and passed the bar.

He rose rapidly both at the bar and in politics, becoming a wealthy slaveholding planter who was elected to and served in both houses of the Louisiana legislature prior to his election by the legislature to the U.S. Senate in 1852. There, he was a vocal advocate of slavery. After Louisiana seceded in 1861, Benjamin resigned as senator and returned to New Orleans. He soon moved to Richmond after Confederate President Jefferson Davis appointed him as Attorney General. Benjamin had little to do in that position, but Davis was impressed by his competence and appointed him as Secretary of War. He was a firm supporter of Davis, who reciprocated that loyalty by promoting him to Secretary of State in March 1862, while Benjamin was being criticized for the Confederate defeat at Roanoke Island.

As Secretary of State, Benjamin attempted to gain official recognition for the Confederacy by France and the United Kingdom, but his efforts were ultimately unsuccessful. To preserve the Confederacy as military defeats made its situation increasingly desperate, he advocated freeing and arming the slaves, but his proposals were only partially accepted in the closing month of the war. When Davis fled the Confederate capital of Richmond in early 1865, Benjamin went with him. He left the presidential party and was successful in escaping from the mainland United States, but Davis was captured by the Union Army. Benjamin sailed to Britain, where he settled and became a barrister, again rising to the top of his profession before retiring in 1883. He died in Paris in the following year.

== Early and personal life ==
Judah Philip Benjamin was born on August 6, 1811, in St. Croix of the Danish West Indies (today the United States Virgin Islands), a colony that was under British occupation during the Napoleonic Wars. His parents were Sephardi Jews who married in London, Philip Benjamin (who had been born on the British colony of Nevis) and Rebecca née de Mendes. Philip and Rebecca had been shopkeepers and migrated to the West Indies in search of better opportunities.

Judah, the third of seven children, was given the same name as an older brother who died in infancy. Following a tradition adhered to by some Sephardi, he was named for his paternal grandfather, who performed the brit milah, or circumcision ceremony. The Benjamins encountered hard times in the Danish West Indies, as normal trade was blocked due to the British occupation. In 1813, the Benjamin family moved to Fayetteville, North Carolina, where they had relatives. Philip Benjamin was not financially successful there, and around 1821 moved with his family to Charleston, South Carolina. That city had the largest Jewish community in the United States and a reputation for religious tolerance. Benjamin was learned in his faith but not a successful businessman; Rebecca earned money for the family by operating a fruit stand near the harbor. Phillip Benjamin was a first cousin and business partner of Moroccan-Jewish trader Moses Elias Levy, the father of David Levy Yulee. Levy also immigrated to the United States, in the early 1820s.

Judah and two siblings were boarded with relatives in Fayetteville for about 18 months after the rest of the family moved to Charleston. He attended the Fayetteville Academy, a well-regarded school where his intelligence was recognized. In Charleston, his father was among the founders of the first Reform congregation in the United States. It developed practices that included shorter services conducted in English rather than in Hebrew. Benjamin was ultimately expelled from that community, as he did not keep the Sabbath. The extent of Judah's religious education is uncertain. The boy's intelligence was noted by others in Charleston, one of whom offered to finance his education.

At the age of 14, in 1825, Benjamin entered Yale College, an institution popular among white Southerners; Vice President John C. Calhoun, a South Carolinian, was among its alumni. Although Benjamin was successful as a student at Yale, he left abruptly in 1827 without completing his course of study. The reasons for this are uncertain: In 1861, when Louisiana left the Union and Benjamin resigned as a U.S. senator, an abolitionist newspaper alleged that he had been caught as a thief at Yale. He considered bringing suit for libel but litigation was impractical. In 1901, his sole surviving classmate wrote that Benjamin had been expelled for gambling. One of his biographers, Robert Meade, considered the evidence of wrongdoing by Benjamin to be "too strong to be ignored", but noted that at the time Benjamin left Yale, he was only 16 years old.

After a brief return to Charleston, Benjamin moved to New Orleans, Louisiana. According to Rabbi Bertram W. Korn's volume on that city's Jews, he "arrived in New Orleans in 1828, with no visible assets other than the wit, charm, omnivorous mind and boundless energy with which he would find his place in the sun". After working in a mercantile business, he became a clerk for a law firm, where he began to read law, studying as an apprentice. Knowledge of French was important in practicing law in Louisiana, as the state's code was (and is still) based on French and Spanish law. To earn money, he tutored French Creoles in English; he taught the language to Natalie Bauché de St. Martin on the condition that she teach him French. In late 1832, at age 21, he was admitted to the bar.

Early the following year, Benjamin married Natalie, who was Catholic and from a wealthy French Creole family. As part of her dowry, she brought with her $3,000 and two female slaves, aged 11 and 16 (together worth about $1,000). Even before the marriage, Natalie St. Martin had scandalized New Orleans society by her conduct. William De Ville, in his journal article on the Benjamin marriage contract, suggests that the "St. Martin family was not terribly distraught to be rid of their young daughter" and that "Benjamin was virtually suborned to marry [Natalie], and did so without hesitation in order to further his ambitions".

The marriage was not a success. By the 1840s, Natalie Benjamin was living in Paris with the couple's only child, Ninette, whom she raised as a Catholic. (Note: Anne Julie Marie Natalie Benjamin. See Butler, p. 36) Benjamin would visit them annually. While a senator, in the late 1850s he persuaded Natalie to rejoin him and expensively furnished a home in Washington for all three to live in. Natalie and their daughter soon embarked again for France. Benjamin, publicly humiliated by his failure to keep Natalie, consigned the household goods to auction. There were rumors, never substantiated, that Benjamin was impotent and that Natalie was unfaithful.

Benjamin's troubled married life has led to speculation that he was gay. Daniel Brook, in a 2012 article about Benjamin, suggests that early biographies read as though "historians are presenting him as an almost farcically stereotypical gay man and yet wear such impervious heteronormative blinders that they themselves know not what they write". These conjectures were not given scholarly weight until 2001, when, in an introduction to a reprinting of Meade's biography of Benjamin, Civil War historian William C. Davis acknowledged "cloaked suggestions that he [Benjamin] was a homosexual".

== Louisiana lawyer ==
Within months of his admission to the bar, Benjamin argued his first case before the Supreme Court of Louisiana and won. Still, clients were slow to come in his first years in practice. He had enough free time to compile and publish, with Thomas Slidell, the Digest of the Reported Decisions of the Superior Court of the Late Territory of Orleans and the Supreme Court of the State of Louisiana in 1834, which required the analysis of 6,000 cases. The book was an immediate success and helped launch Benjamin's career. When Slidell published a revised edition in 1840, he did so alone, as Benjamin was too busy litigating cases to participate.

Benjamin became a specialist in commercial law, of which there was a great deal in New Orleans' busy river port—a center of international commerce and the domestic slave trade. By 1840, the city had become the fourth largest in the United States and among the wealthiest. Many of the best lawyers in the country practiced commercial law there, and Benjamin successfully competed with them. In one case, he successfully represented the seller of a slave against allegations that the seller knew the slave had incurable tuberculosis. Although Benjamin tried some jury cases, he preferred bench trials in commercial cases and was an expert at appeals.

In 1842, Benjamin had a group of cases with international implications. He represented insurance companies being sued for the value of slaves who had revolted aboard the ship Creole in 1841, as they were being transported in the coastwise slave trade from Virginia to New Orleans. The rebels had sailed the ship to Nassau in the Bahamas, a British colony, where those who came ashore were freed, as Britain had abolished slavery in 1834. The owners of the slaves brought suit for $150,000 against their insurers, who declined to pay. Benjamin made several arguments, the most prominent of which was that the slaveowners had brought the revolt on themselves by packing the slaves in overcrowded conditions.

Benjamin said in his brief to the court:

What is a slave? He is a human being. He has feelings and passion and intellect. His heart, like the heart of the white man, swells with love, burns with jealousy, aches with sorrow, pines under restraint and discomfort, boils with revenge, and ever cherishes the desire for liberty ... Considering the character of the slave, and the peculiar passions which, generated by nature, are strengthened and stimulated by his condition, he is prone to revolt in the near future of things, and ever ready to conquer [i.e. obtain] his liberty where a probable chance presents itself.

The court ruled for Benjamin's clients, although on other grounds. Benjamin's brief was widely reprinted, including by abolitionist groups. Historian Eli Evans, Benjamin's biographer, does not believe that the argument in the Creole case represented Benjamin's personal view; rather, he was an advocate for his clients in an era when it was usual to write dramatically to distract attention from the weaker points of a case. Evans finds it remarkable and a testament to Benjamin that he could be elected to office in antebellum Louisiana, a slave society, after writing such words.

== Electoral career ==
=== State politician ===
Benjamin was a supporter of the Whig Party from the time of its formation in the early 1830s. He became increasingly involved in the party, and in 1841 ran unsuccessfully for the New Orleans Board of Aldermen. The following year, he was nominated for the Louisiana House of Representatives. He was elected, though the Democrats alleged fraud: Whig supporters, to obtain the vote at a time when the state had a restrictive property qualification for suffrage, acquired licenses for carriages. A voter did not have to demonstrate that the carriage existed, but his license had to be accepted as evidence of ownership by election officials. The Democratic press blamed Benjamin as the strategist behind this maneuver. In 1844, the legislature voted to hold a constitutional convention, and Benjamin was chosen as a delegate from New Orleans. At the convention, Benjamin successfully opposed counting a slave as three-fifths of a human being for purposes of representation in state elections, as was done in federal elections. His position prevailed, and slaves were not counted at all for electoral purposes in Louisiana state elections. According to Evans, his "tact, courtesy, and ability to find compromises impressed the political elders in all corners of the state".

Rabbi Myron Berman, in his history of Jews in Richmond, describes the attitude of antebellum white Southerners toward Jews:

Hidden beneath the free and easy relationships between Jew and Gentile in the antebellum South was a layer of prejudice that derived from historic anti-Semitism. The obverse of the picture of the Jew as the Biblical patriarch and apostle of freedom was the image of the Judas-traitor and the Shylock-materialist who preyed on the misfortunes of the country. But the high incidence of Jewish assimilation, the availability of the black as a scapegoat for social ills, and the relative absence of crises—economic and otherwise—were factors which repressed, at least temporarily, the latent anti-Jewish feeling in the South.

By the early 1840s, Benjamin was wealthy from his law practice and, with a partner, bought a sugar cane plantation, Bellechasse. This purchase, and the subsequent construction of a grand house there, advanced Benjamin's ambitions; the planter class controlled Louisiana politics and would trust only a man who also owned substantial land and slaves. The Benjamin marriage was by then failing, and he hoped in vain that his wife would be content at the plantation. Benjamin threw his energy into improving Bellechasse, importing new varieties of sugar cane and adopting up-to-date methods and equipment to extract and process the sugar. He purchased 140 slaves to work the plantation, and had a reputation as a humane slaveowner.

Benjamin scaled back his involvement in politics in the late 1840s, distracted by his plantation and law practice. His mother Rebecca, whom he had brought to New Orleans, died in 1847 during a yellow fever epidemic. In 1848, Benjamin was a Whig member of the Electoral College; he voted for fellow Louisiana planter, General Zachary Taylor, who was elected U.S. President. He and other Louisianans accompanied President-elect Taylor to Washington for his inauguration, and Benjamin attended a state dinner given by outgoing president James K. Polk. In 1850, Millard Fillmore, who succeeded Taylor after his death earlier that year, appointed Benjamin as judge of the United States District Court for the Northern District of California. He was confirmed by the Senate, but he declined the appointment as the salary of $3,500 was too small. The following year, Benjamin assisted the United States Attorney in New Orleans in prosecuting American adventurers who had tried to spark a rebellion against Spanish rule in Cuba, but two trials both ended in hung juries.

=== Mexican railroad ===
Benjamin became interested in strengthening trade connections between New Orleans and California, and promoted an infrastructure project to build a railroad across the Mexican isthmus near Oaxaca; this would speed passenger traffic and cargo shipments. According to The New York Times, in an 1852 speech to a railroad builders' convention, Benjamin said this trade route "belongs to New Orleans. Its commerce makes empires of the countries to which it flows." Benjamin lobbied fellow lawmakers about the project, gained funds from private New York bankers, and even helped organize construction crews. In private correspondence he warned backers of problems; project workers suffered yellow fever, shipments of construction materials hit rough seas, and actions or inaction by both U.S. and Mexican officials caused delays and increases in construction costs. Backers had invested several hundred thousand dollars by the time the project died after the outbreak of the American Civil War in 1861.

=== Election to the Senate ===
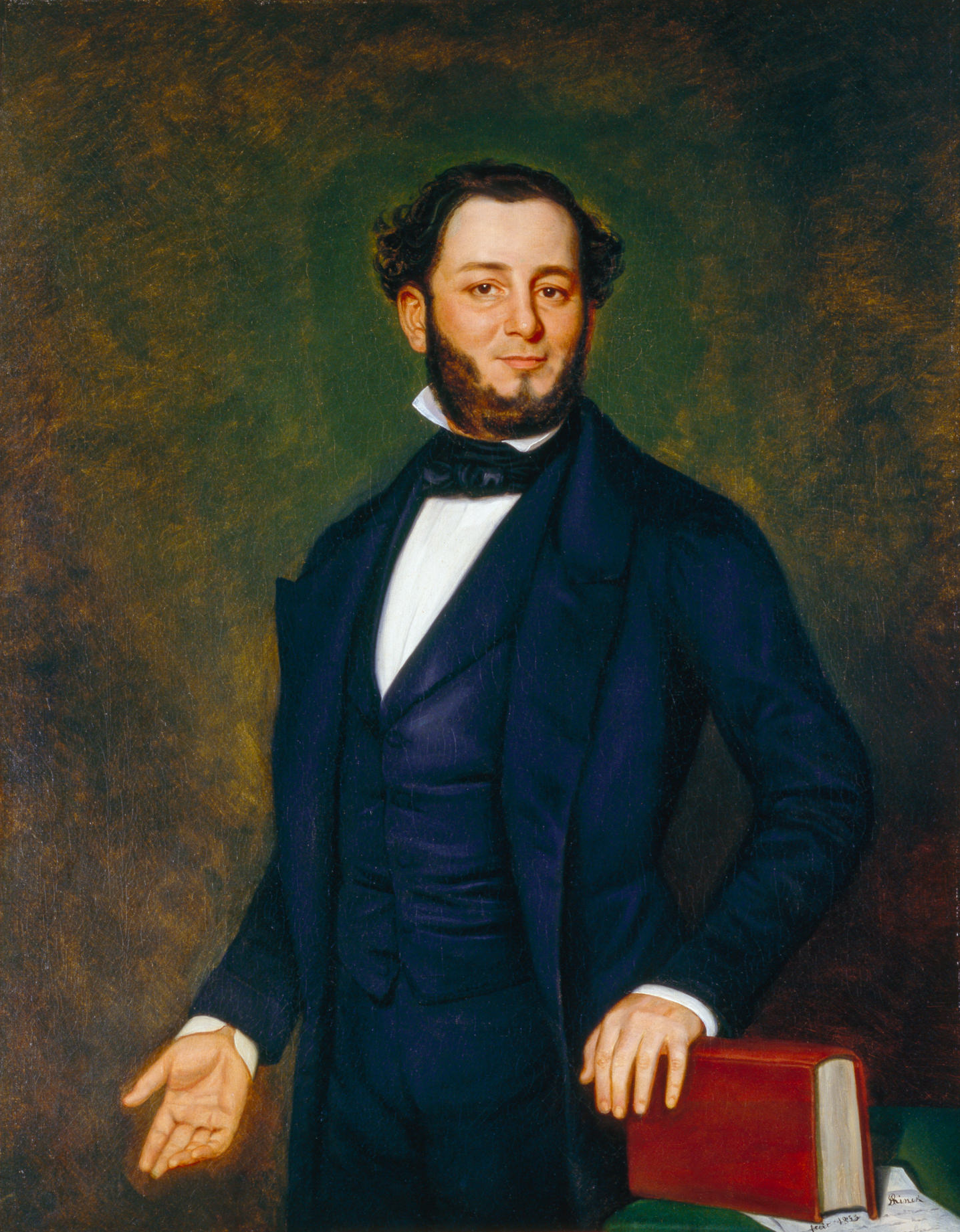
Benjamin, c. 1853, by Adolph Rinck

Benjamin spent the summer of 1851 abroad, including a visit to Paris to see Natalie and Ninette. He was still away in October 1851, when the Whigs nominated him for the state Senate. Despite his absence, he was easily elected. When the new legislature met in January 1852, Benjamin emerged as one of the leading Whig candidates for election to the U.S. Senate seat that would become vacant on March 4, 1853. As the Louisiana legislature, responsible for electing the state's senators, (Note: Until 1913 and the ratification of the Seventeenth Amendment to the United States Constitution, U.S. senators were elected by state legislatures. See Ginsburg) met once in two years under the 1845 constitution, it was not scheduled to meet again before the seat became vacant. Some Whig newspapers thought Benjamin too young and inexperienced at forty, despite his undoubted talent, but the Whig legislative caucus selected him on the second ballot, and he was elected by the two houses over Democrat Solomon W. Downs. He was the fifth person of Jewish descent to be elected to the United States Congress, after David Levy Yulee, Lewis Charles Levin, David S. Kaufman, and Emanuel B. Hart.

The outgoing president, Fillmore, offered to nominate Benjamin, a fellow Whig, to fill a Supreme Court vacancy after the Senate Democrats had defeated Fillmore's other nominees for the post. The New York Times reported on February 15, 1853, that "if the President nominates Benjamin, the Democrats are determined to confirm him." The new president, Franklin Pierce, a Democrat, also offered Benjamin a place on the Supreme Court. Pierce Butler suggested in his 1908 biography of Benjamin that the newly elected senator likely declined these offers not only because he preferred active politics, but because he could maintain his law practice and substantial income as a senator, but could not as a justice. As an advocate before the U.S. Supreme Court, Benjamin won 13 of his first 18 cases.

Judah Benjamin was sworn in as senator from Louisiana on March 4, 1853, at a brief meeting called just prior to President Pierce's inauguration. These new colleagues included Stephen A. Douglas of Illinois, Robert M. T. Hunter of Virginia, and Sam Houston of Texas. The slavery issue was in a brief remission as much of the country wished to accept the Compromise of 1850 as a final settlement. When the Senate was not in session, Benjamin remained in Washington, D.C., conducting a lucrative practice including many cases before the Supreme Court, then conveniently located in a room of the Capitol. His law partners in New Orleans took care of his firm's affairs there. About this time Benjamin sold his interest in Bellechasse, lacking the time to deal with plantation business.

=== Spokesman for slavery ===
Benjamin's view that slavery should continue was based in his belief that citizens had a right to their property as guaranteed by the Constitution. As Butler put it, "he could no more see that it was right for Northern people to rob him of his slave than it would be for him to connive at horse stealing". He avoided the arguments of some that the slaves were inferior beings, and that their position was ordained by God: Evans ascribes this to Benjamin not being raised as a slaveowner, but coming to it later in life. Benjamin joined in a widespread view of white Southerners that the African American would not be ready for emancipation for many years, if ever. They feared that freeing the slaves would ruin many and lead to murders and rapes by the newly liberated of their former masters and mistresses. Such a massacre had been feared by Southerners since the Haitian Revolution, the violent revolt known as "Santo Domingo" in the South, in which the slaves of what became Haiti killed many whites and mulattoes in the 1804 massacre, after successfully gaining independence from French control. When the anti-slavery book Uncle Tom's Cabin was published in 1852, Benjamin spoke out against Harriet Beecher Stowe's portrayal. He said that slaves were for the most part well treated, and plantation punishments, such as whipping or branding, were more merciful than sentences of imprisonment that a white man might receive in the North for similar conduct.

In early 1854, Senator Douglas introduced his Kansas–Nebraska Bill, calling for popular sovereignty to determine whether the Kansas and Nebraska territories should enter the Union as slave or free states. Depending on the outcome of such elections, slavery might spread to territories closed to it under the Missouri Compromise of 1820. In the debate over the bill, Benjamin defended this change as returning to "the traditions of the fathers", that the federal government not legislate on the subject of slavery. He said that the South merely wished to be left alone. The bill passed, but its passage had drastic political effects, as the differences between North and South that had been thought settled by both the 1820 and 1850 compromises were reopened. The Whig Party was torn apart North from South, with many Northern Whigs joining the new Republican Party, a group pledged to oppose the spread of slavery. Benjamin continued to caucus with the remains of the Whig Party through 1854 and 1855 but, as a member of a legislative minority, he had little influence on legislation and received no important committee assignments.

In May 1856, Benjamin joined the Democrats, stating they had the principles of the old-time Whig Party. He indicated, in a letter to constituents, that, as Northern Whigs had failed to vote to uphold the rights granted to Southern states in the Constitution, the Whigs, as a national party, were no more.

At a state dinner given by Pierce, Benjamin first met Secretary of War Jefferson Davis, whose wife Varina described the Louisiana senator as having "rather the air of a witty bon vivant than of a great senator". The two men, both ambitious for leadership in the South and the nation, formed a relationship that Evans describes as "respectful but wary". The two had occasional differences; when in 1858, Davis, by then a Mississippi senator, was irritated by Benjamin's questioning him on a military bill and suggested that Benjamin was acting as a paid attorney, the Louisianan challenged him to a duel. Davis apologized.

Benjamin, in his speeches in the Senate, took the position that the Union was a compact by the states from which any of them could secede. Nevertheless, he understood that any dissolution would not be peaceful, stating in 1856 that "dreadful will be the internecine war that must ensue". In 1859, Benjamin was elected to a second term, but allegations of involvement in land scandals and the fact that upstate legislators objected to both of Louisiana's senators being from New Orleans stretched the contest to 42 ballots before he prevailed.

=== Secession crisis ===
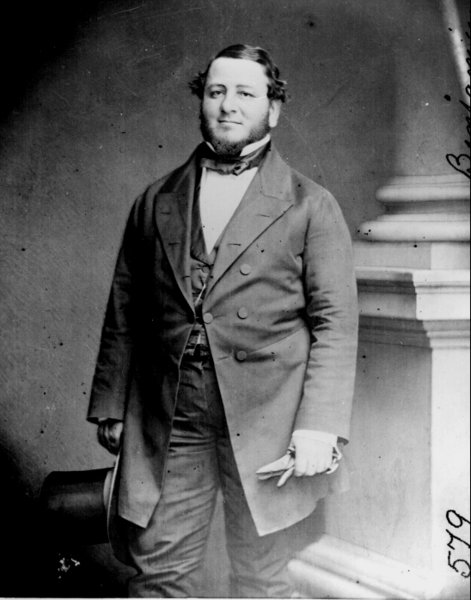
Benjamin, c. 1860–1865

Benjamin worked to deny Douglas the 1860 Democratic presidential nomination, feeling he had turned against the South. Douglas contended that although the Supreme Court, in Dred Scott v. Sandford, had stated Congress could not restrict slavery in the territories, the people of each territory could pass legislation to bar it. This position was anathema to the South. Benjamin praised Douglas's opponent in his re-election bid, former US Representative Abraham Lincoln, for at least being true to his principles as an opponent of the expansion of slavery, whereas Benjamin considered Douglas to be a hypocrite. Benjamin was joined in his opposition to Douglas by Senator Davis; the two were so successful that the 1860 convention was not able to nominate anyone and split into Northern and Southern factions. The Northerners backed Douglas while Southern delegates chose Vice President John C. Breckinridge of Kentucky. Despite their agreement in opposing Douglas, Benjamin and Davis differed on some race issues: in May, Benjamin voted for a bill to aid Africans liberated by U.S. naval vessels from illegal slave ships, in order to return them to their native continent from Key West. Davis and many other Southerners opposed the bill.

Between June and December 1860 Benjamin was almost entirely absorbed in the case of United States v. Castillero, which was tried in San Francisco during the latter part of that period. The case concerned a land grant by the former Mexican government of California. Castillero had leased part of his land to British mining companies, and when American authorities ruled the grant invalid, they hired Benjamin; he spent four months in San Francisco working on the case. The trial began in October, and Benjamin gave an address lasting six days. The local correspondent for The New York Times wrote that Benjamin, "a distinguished stranger", drew the largest crowds to the courtroom and "the Senator is making this terribly tedious case interesting". Once the case was submitted for decision in early November, Benjamin departed for the East. The court's ruling, rendered in January 1861, was substantially for his clients, but not satisfied, they appealed. They lost the case entirely to an adverse decision by the U.S. Supreme Court, three justices dissenting, the following year. Benjamin was by then a Confederate Cabinet officer, and could not argue the case. His co-counsel filed his brief with the court.

By the time Benjamin returned to the east, the Republican candidate, Lincoln, had been elected president, and there was talk, in Louisiana and elsewhere, of secession from the Union. The New Orleans Picayune reported that Benjamin favored secession only in the last resort. On December 23, 1860, another Louisiana periodical, the Delta, printed a letter from Benjamin dated December 8 stating that, as the people of the North were of unalterable hostility to their Southern brethren, the latter should depart from the government common to them. He also signed a joint letter from Southern Representatives to their constituents, urging the formation of a confederation of the seceding states. According to a letter reportedly written by Benjamin during the crisis, he saw secession as a means of obtaining more favorable terms in a reformed Union.

With Southern opinion turning in favor of secession, Benjamin made a farewell speech in the Senate on December 31, 1860, to a packed gallery, desirous of hearing one of the South's most eloquent voices. They were not disappointed; Evans writes that "historians consider Benjamin's farewell ... one of the great speeches in American history." Benjamin foresaw that the South's departure would lead to civil war:

What may be the fate of this horrible contest none can foretell; but this much I will say: the fortunes of war may be adverse to our arms; you may carry desolation into our peaceful land, and with torch and firebrand may set our cities in flames ... you may do all this, and more, but you never can subjugate us; you never can convert the free sons of the soil into vassals, paying tribute to your power; you never can degrade them to a servile and inferior race. Never! Never!

According to Geoffrey D. Cunningham in his article on Benjamin's role in secession, "Swept up in the popular cries for independence, Benjamin willingly went out with the Southern tide." He and his Louisiana colleague, John Slidell, resigned from the Senate on February 4, 1861, nine days after their state declared secession.

== Confederate statesman ==
=== Attorney General ===
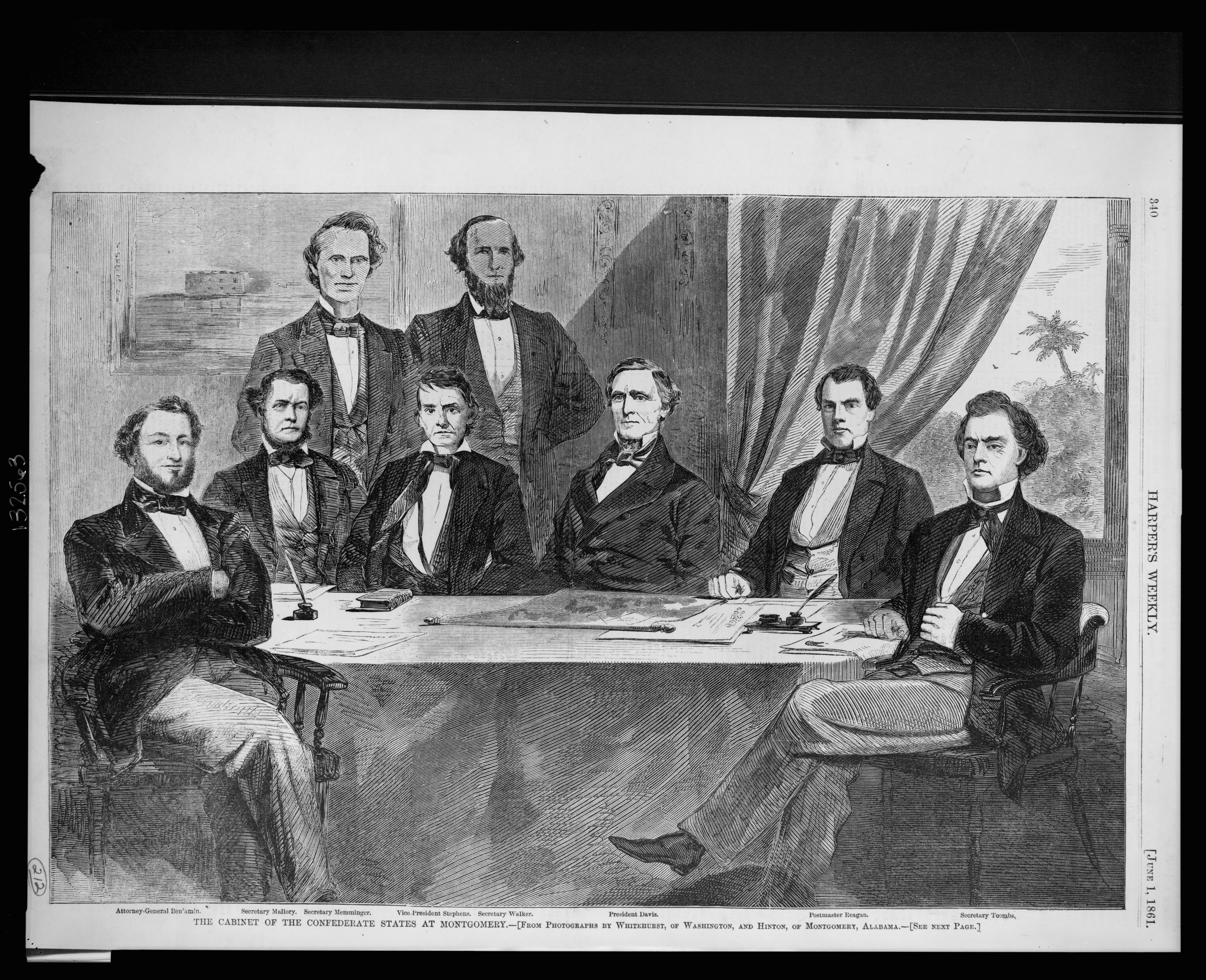
The original Confederate Cabinet, 1861. L-R: Judah P. Benjamin, Stephen Mallory, Christopher Memminger, Alexander Stephens, LeRoy Pope Walker, Jefferson Davis, John H. Reagan and Robert Toombs.

Fearful of arrest as a rebel once he left the Senate, Benjamin quickly departed Washington for New Orleans. On the day of Benjamin's resignation, the Provisional Confederate States Congress gathered in Montgomery, Alabama, and soon chose Davis as president. Davis was sworn in as provisional Confederate States President on February 18, 1861. At home in New Orleans for, it would prove, the last time, Benjamin addressed a rally on Washington's Birthday, February 22, 1861. On February 25, Davis appointed Benjamin, still in New Orleans, as attorney general; the Louisianan was approved immediately and unanimously by the provisional Congress. Davis thus became the first chief executive in North America to appoint a Jew to his Cabinet.

Davis, in his memoirs, remarked that he chose Benjamin because he "had a very high reputation as a lawyer, and my acquaintance with him in the Senate had impressed me with the lucidity of his intellect, his systematic habits, and capacity for labor". Meade suggested that Davis wanted to have a Louisianan in his Cabinet, but that a smarter course of action would have been to send Benjamin abroad to win over the European governments. Butler called Benjamin's appointment "a waste of good material". Historian William C. Davis, in his volume on the formation of the Confederate government, notes, "For some there was next to nothing to do, none more so than Benjamin." The role of the attorney general in a Confederacy that did not yet have federal courts or marshals was so minimal that initial layouts for the building housing the government in Montgomery allotted no space to the Justice Department.

Meade found the time that Benjamin spent as attorney general to be fruitful, as it allowed him the opportunity to judge Davis's character and to ingratiate himself with the president. Benjamin served as a host, entertaining dignitaries and others Davis had no time to see. At the first Cabinet meeting, Benjamin counseled Davis to have the government buy 150,000 bales of cotton for shipment to the United Kingdom, with the proceeds used to buy arms and for future needs. His advice was not taken, as the Cabinet believed the war would be short and successful. Benjamin was called upon from time to time to render legal opinions, writing on April 1 to assure Treasury Secretary Christopher Memminger that lemons and oranges could enter the Confederacy duty-free, but walnuts could not.

Once Virginia joined the Confederacy, the capital was moved to Richmond, though against Benjamin's advice—he believed that the city was too close to the North. Nevertheless, he traveled there with his brother-in-law, Jules St. Martin; the two lived in the same house throughout the war, and Benjamin probably procured the young man's job at the War Department. Although Alabama's Leroy Walker was Secretary of War, Davis—a war hero and former U.S. War Secretary—considered himself more qualified and gave many orders himself. When the Confederates were unable to follow up their victory at the First Battle of Manassas by threatening Washington, Walker was criticized in the press. In September, Walker resigned to join the army as a brigadier general, and Davis appointed Benjamin in his place. Butler wrote that Davis had found the cheerfully competent Benjamin "a most useful member of the official family, and thought him suited for almost any post in it." In addition to his appointment as War Secretary, Benjamin continued to act as Attorney General until November 15, 1861.

=== Secretary of War ===
As War Secretary, Benjamin was responsible for a territory stretching from Virginia to Texas. It was his job, with Davis looking over his shoulder, to supervise the Confederate Army and to feed, supply, and arm it in a nascent country with almost no arms manufacturers. Accordingly, Benjamin saw his job as closely tied to foreign affairs, as the Confederacy was dependent on imports to supply its troops. Davis had chosen a "defensive war" strategy: the Confederacy would await invasion by the Union and then seek to defeat its armies until Lincoln tired of sending them. Davis and Benjamin worked together closely, and as Davis came to realize that his subordinate was loyal to the Confederacy and to Davis personally, he returned complete trust in Benjamin. Varina Davis wrote, "It was to me a curious spectacle, the steady approximation to a thorough friendliness of the President and his War Minister. It was a very gradual rapprochement, but all the more solid for that reason."

In his months as War Secretary, Benjamin sent thousands of communications. According to Evans, Benjamin initially "turn[ed] prejudice to his favor and play[ed] on the Southerner's instinctive respect for the Jewish mind with a brilliant performance." Nevertheless, Benjamin faced difficulties that he could do little to solve. The Confederacy lacked sufficient soldiers, trained officers to command them, naval and civilian ships, manufacturing capacity to make ships and many weapons, and powder for guns and cannon. The Union had those things and moved to block the South's access to European supplies, both by blockades and by buying up supplies that the South might have secured. Other problems included drunkenness among the men and their officers and uncertainty as to when and where the expected Northern invasion would begin. Also, Benjamin had no experience of the military or of the executive branch of the government, placing him in a poor position to contradict Davis.

Judah P. Benjamin, the dapper Jew,
Seal-sleek, black-eyed, lawyer and epicure,
Able, well-hated, face alive with life,
Looked round the council-chamber with the slight
Perpetual smile he held before himself
Continually like a silk-ribbed fan.
Behind the fan, his quick, shrewd, fluid mind,
Weighed Gentiles in an old balance.

— Stephen Vincent Benét, "John Brown's Body" (1928)

An insurgency against the Confederacy developed in staunchly pro-Union East Tennessee in late 1861, and at Davis's order, Benjamin sent troops to crush it. Once it was put down, Benjamin and Davis were in a quandary about what to do about its leader, William "Parson" Brownlow, who had been captured, and eventually allowed him to cross to Union-controlled territory in the hope that it would cause Lincoln to release Confederate prisoners. While Brownlow was in Southern custody, he stated that he expected, "no more mercy from Benjamin than was shown by his illustrious predecessors towards Jesus Christ".

Benjamin had difficulty in managing the Confederacy's generals. He quarreled with General P.G.T. Beauregard, a war hero since his victory at First Manassas. Beauregard sought to add a rocket battery to his command, an action that Benjamin stated was not authorized by law. He was most likely relaying Davis's views, and when challenged by Beauregard, Davis backed Benjamin, advising the general to "dismiss this small matter from your mind. In the hostile masses before you, you have a subject more worthy of your contemplation". In January 1862, Stonewall Jackson's forces had advanced in western Virginia, leaving troops under William W. Loring at the small town of Romney. Distant from Jackson's other forces and ill-supplied, Loring and other officers petitioned the War Department to be recalled, and Benjamin, after consulting Davis, so ordered after he used the pretext of rumored Union troop movements in the area. Jackson complied but, in a letter to Benjamin, asked to be removed from the front or to resign. High-ranking Confederates soothed Jackson into withdrawing his request.

The power of state governments was another flaw in the Confederacy and a problem for Benjamin. Georgia Governor Joseph E. Brown repeatedly demanded arms and the return of Georgian troops to defend his state. North Carolina Governor Henry T. Clark also wanted troops returned to him to defend his coastline. After Cape Hatteras, on the North Carolina's coast, was captured, Confederate forces fell back to Roanoke Island. If it fell, a number of ports in that area of the coast would be at risk, and Norfolk, Virginia, might be threatened by land.

General Henry A. Wise, commanding Roanoke, also demanded troops and supplies. He received little from Benjamin's War Department that had no arms to send, as the Union blockade was preventing supplies from being imported. That Confederate armories were empty was a fact not publicly known at the time. Benjamin and Davis hoped that the island's defenses could hold off the Union forces, but an overwhelming number of troops were landed in February 1862 at an undefended point, and the Confederates were quickly defeated. Combined with Union General Ulysses S. Grant's capture of Fort Henry, the site of the Battle of Fort Henry, and Fort Donelson in Tennessee, it was the most severe military blow yet to the Confederacy, and there was a public outcry against Benjamin, led by General Wise.

It was revealed a quarter-century after the war that Benjamin and Davis had agreed for Benjamin to act as a scapegoat, rather than to reveal the shortage of arms. Not knowing it, the Richmond Examiner accused Benjamin of "stupid complacency." Diarist Mary Chestnut recorded that "the mob calls him Mr. Davis's pet Jew." The Wise family never forgave Benjamin, to the detriment of his memory in Southern eyes. Wise's son, Captain Jennings Wise, fell at Roanoke Island, and Henry's grandson John Wise, interviewed in 1936, told Meade that "the fat Jew sitting at his desk" was to blame. Another of the general's sons, also named John Wise, wrote a highly-popular book about the South in the Civil War, The End of an Era (1899) in which he said that Benjamin "had more brains and less heart than any other civic leader in the South. ... The Confederacy and its collapse were no more to Judah P. Benjamin than last year's birds nest."

The Confederate States Congress established a special committee to investigate the military losses, and Benjamin testified before it. The Secretary of State, Virginia's Robert M. T. Hunter, had quarreled with Davis and resigned, and in March 1862, Benjamin was appointed as his replacement. Varina Davis noted that some in Congress had sought Benjamin's ouster "because of reverses which no one could have averted, [so] the President promoted him to the State Department with a personal and aggrieved sense of injustice done to the man who had now become his friend and right hand." Richmond diarist Sallie Ann Brock Putnam wrote, "Mr. Benjamin was not forgiven... this act on the part of the President [in promoting Benjamin], in defiance of public opinion, was considered as unwise, arbitrary, and a reckless risking of his reputation and popularity... [Benjamin] was ever afterwards unpopular in the Confederacy, and particularly in Virginia." Despite the promotion, the committee reported that any blame for the defeat at Roanoke Island should attach to Wise's superior, Major General Benjamin Huger, "and the late secretary of war, J.P. Benjamin."

=== Secretary of State ===
Throughout his time as Secretary of State, Benjamin tried to induce Britain and France to recognize the Confederacy—no other nation was likely to do so unless these powerful states led the way. The protection this would bring to the Confederacy and its foreign trade was hoped to be enough to save it.

==== Basis of Confederate foreign policy ====
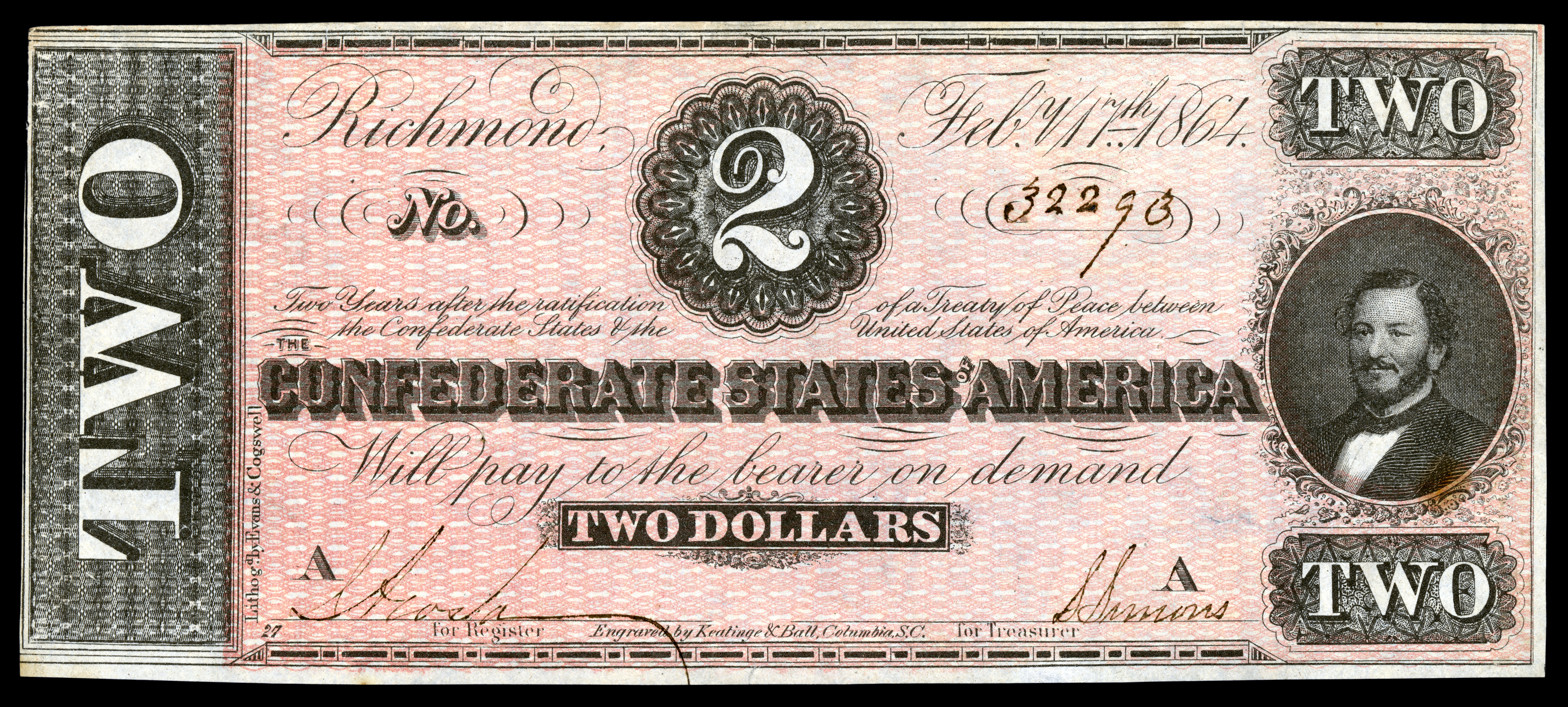
Benjamin on the 1864 Confederate $2 banknote.

By the 1850s, cheap Southern cotton fueled the industries of Europe. The mills of Britain, developed during the first half of the 19th century, by 1860 used more cotton than the rest of the industrialized world combined. Cotton imports to Britain came almost entirely from the American South. According to an article in The Economist in 1853, "let any great social or physical convulsion visit the United States, and England would feel the shock from Land's End to John O'Groats. The lives of nearly two million of our countrymen ... hang upon a thread."

In 1855, an Ohioan, David Christy, published Cotton Is King: or Slavery in the Light of Political Economy. Christy argued that the flow of cotton was so important to the industrialized world that cutting it off would be devastating—not least to the Northern United States, as cotton was by far the largest U.S. export. This became known as the "King Cotton" theory, to which Davis was an enthusiastic subscriber. Benjamin also spoke in favor of the theory, though Butler suspected he may have "known better", based on his firsthand knowledge of Europe.

When war came, Davis, against Benjamin's advice, imposed an embargo on exports of cotton to nations that had not recognized the Confederate government, hoping to force such relations, especially with Britain and France. As the Union was attempting to prevent cotton from being exported from Confederate ports by a blockade and other means, this played to a certain extent into the hands of Lincoln and his Secretary of State, William H. Seward. Additionally, when the war began, Britain had a large surplus of cotton in warehouses, enough to keep the mills running at least part-time for a year or so. Although many prominent Britons believed the South would prevail, there was a reluctance to recognize Richmond until it had gained the military victories to put its foe at bay. Much of this was due to hatred of slavery, though part of it stemmed from a desire to remain on good terms with the U.S. government—due to a drought in 1862, Britain was forced to import large quantities of wheat and flour from the United States. Also, Britain feared the expansionist Americans might invade the vulnerable Canadian colonies, as Seward hinted they might.

==== Appointment ====
Davis appointed Benjamin as Secretary of State on March 17, 1862. He was promptly confirmed by the Confederate Senate. A motion to reconsider the confirmation was lost, 13–8. According to Butler, the appointment of Benjamin brought Davis little political support, as the average white Southerner did not understand Benjamin and somewhat disliked him. As there was not much open opposition to Davis in the South at the time, Benjamin's appointment was not criticized, but was not given much praise either. Meade noted, "the silence of many influential newspapers was ominous. [Benjamin's] promotion in the face of such bitter criticism of his conduct in the war office caused the first serious lack of confidence in the Davis government."

Meade wrote that, since the Secretary of State would have to work closely with Jefferson Davis, Benjamin was likely the person best suited to the position. In addition to his relationship with the President, Benjamin was very close to the Confederate First Lady, Varina Davis, with whom he exchanged confidences regarding war events and the President's health. "Together, and by turns, they could help him over the most difficult days."

For recreation, Benjamin frequented Richmond's gambling dens, playing poker and faro. He was incensed when British correspondent William Howard Russell publicized his gambling, feeling that it was an invasion of his private affairs. He was also displeased that Russell depicted him as a losing gambler, when his reputation was the opposite.

==== Early days (1862–1863) ====
The Trent Affair had taken place before Benjamin took office as Secretary of State: a U.S. warship had in October 1861 removed Confederate diplomats James Mason and James Slidell (Benjamin's former Louisiana colleague in the U.S. Senate) and their private secretaries from a British-flagged vessel. The crisis brought the U.S. and Britain near war, and was resolved by their release. By the time of Benjamin's appointment, Mason and Slidell were at their posts in London and Paris as putative ministers from the Confederacy, seeking recognition by the governments of Britain and France. With difficult communications between the South and Europe (dispatches were often lost or intercepted), Benjamin was initially reluctant to change the instructions given the agents by Secretary Hunter. Communications improved by 1863, with Benjamin ordering that dispatches be sent to Bermuda or the Bahamas, from where they reached the Confederacy by blockade runner.

As a practical matter, Benjamin's chances of gaining European recognition rose and fell with the military fortunes of the Confederacy. When, at the end of June 1862, Confederate General Robert E. Lee turned back Union General George B. McClellan's Peninsula Campaign in the Seven Days Battles, ending the immediate threat to Richmond, Emperor Napoleon III of France favorably received proposals from Benjamin, through Slidell, for the French to intervene on the Confederacy's behalf in exchange for trade concessions. Nevertheless, the Emperor proved unwilling to act without Britain. In August 1862, Mason, angered by the refusal of British government ministers to meet with him, threatened to resign his post. Benjamin soothed him, stating that while Mason should not submit to insulting treatment, resignation should not take place without discussion.

The bloody standoff at Antietam in September 1862 that ended Lee's first major incursion into the North gave Lincoln the confidence in Union arms he needed to announce the Emancipation Proclamation. British newspapers mocked Lincoln for hypocrisy in freeing slaves only in Confederate-held areas, where he could exercise no authority. British officials had been shocked by the outcome of Antietam—they had expected Lee to deliver another brilliant victory—and now considered an additional reason for intervening in the conflict. Antietam, the bloodiest day of the war, had been a stalemate; they read this as presaging an overall deadlock in the war, with North and South at each other's throats for years as Britain's mills sat empty and its people starved. France agreed with this assessment.

The final few months of 1862 saw a high water mark for Benjamin's diplomacy. In October, the British Chancellor of the Exchequer, William Gladstone, expressed confidence in Confederate victory, stating in Newcastle, "There is no doubt that Jefferson Davis and other leaders of the South have made an army. They are making, it appears, a navy, and they have made what is more than either—they have made a nation." Later that month, Napoleon proposed to the British and Russians (a U.S. ally) that they combine to require a six months' armistice for mediation, and an end to the blockade; if they did so, it would likely lead to Southern independence. The proposal divided the British Cabinet. In mid-November, at the urgings of Palmerston and War Secretary George Cornewall Lewis, members decided to continue to wait for the South to defeat Lincoln's forces before recognizing it. Although proponents of intervention were prepared to await another opportunity, growing realization among the British public that the Emancipation Proclamation meant that Union victory would be slavery's end made succoring the South politically infeasible.

Benjamin had not been allowed to offer the inducement for intervention that might have succeeded—abolition of slavery in the Confederacy, and because of that, Meade deemed his diplomacy "seriously, perhaps fatally handicapped". The Secretary of State blamed Napoleon for the failure, believing the Emperor had betrayed the Confederacy to get the ruler the French had installed in Mexico, Maximilian, accepted by the United States.

In Paris, Slidell had been approached by the banking firm Erlanger et Cie. The company offered to float a loan to benefit the Confederacy. (Note: Slidell described the contact as "uninvited". His daughter was engaged at the time to, and later married, d'Erlanger. See Evans, p. 194) The proposed terms provided a large commission to Erlanger and would entitle the bondholder to cotton at a discounted price once the South won the war. Baron Frederic Emile d'Erlanger, head of the firm, journeyed to Richmond in early 1863, and negotiated with Benjamin, although the transaction properly fell within the jurisdiction of Treasury Secretary Memminger. The banker softened the terms somewhat, though they were still lucrative for his firm. Benjamin felt the deal was worth it, as it would provide the Confederacy with badly needed funds to pay its agents in Europe.

==== Increasing desperation (1863–1865) ====
The twin rebel defeats at Gettysburg and Vicksburg in early July 1863 made it unlikely that Britain, or any other nation, would recognize a slaveholding Confederacy staggering towards oblivion. Accordingly, in August, Benjamin wrote to Mason telling him that as Davis believed the British unwilling to recognize the South, he was free to leave the country. In October, with Davis absent on a trip to Tennessee, Benjamin heard that the British consul in Savannah had forbidden British subjects in the Confederate Army from being used against the United States. The Secretary of State convened a Cabinet meeting, that expelled the remaining British consuls in Confederate-controlled territory, then notified Davis by letter. Evans suggests that Benjamin's actions made him the Confederacy's acting president—the first Jewish president.

Benjamin supervised the Confederate Secret Service, responsible for covert operations in the North, and financed former federal Interior Secretary Jacob Thompson to work behind the scenes financing operations that might undermine Lincoln politically. Although efforts were made to boost Peace Democrats, the most prominent actions proved to be the St. Albans Raid (an attack on a Vermont town from Canada) and an unsuccessful attempt to burn New York City. In the aftermath of the war, these activities led to accusations that Benjamin and Davis were involved in the assassination of Abraham Lincoln, as one Confederate courier, John H. Surratt, who had received money from Benjamin, was tried for involvement in the conspiracy, though Surratt was acquitted.

As the Confederacy's military fortunes flagged, there was increasing consideration of what would have been unthinkable in 1861—enlisting male slaves in the army and emancipating them for their service. In August 1863, B. H. Micou, a relative of a former law partner, wrote to Benjamin proposing the use of black soldiers. Benjamin responded that this was not feasible, principally for legal and financial reasons, and that the slaves were performing valuable services for the Confederacy where they were. According to Meade, "Benjamin did not offer any objections to Micou's plan except on practical grounds—he was not repelled by the radical nature of the proposal". A British financial agent for the Confederacy, James Spence, also urged emancipation as a means of gaining British recognition. Benjamin allowed Spence to remain in his position for almost a year despite the differences with Confederate policy, before finally dismissing him in late 1863. Despite official neutrality, tens of thousands from British-ruled Ireland were enlisting in the Union cause; Benjamin sent an agent to Ireland hoping to impede those efforts and Dudley Mann to Rome to urge Pope Pius IX to forbid Catholic Irish from enlisting. The Pope did not do so, though he responded sympathetically.

In January 1864, Confederate General Patrick Cleburne, of the Army of Tennessee, proposed emancipating and arming the slaves. Davis, when he heard of it, turned it down and ordered it kept secret. Evans notes that Benjamin "had been thinking in similar terms for much longer, and perhaps the recommendation of so respected an officer was just the impetus he needed." The year 1864 was a disastrous one for the Confederacy, with Lee forced within siege lines at Petersburg and Union General William T. Sherman sacking Atlanta and devastating Georgia on his march to the sea. Benjamin urged Davis to send the secretary's fellow Louisianan, Duncan Kenner, to Paris and London, with an offer of emancipation in exchange for recognition. Davis was only willing to offer gradual emancipation, and both Napoleon and Palmerston rejected the proposal. Benjamin continued to press the matter, addressing a mass meeting in Richmond in February 1865 in support of arming the slaves and emancipating them. A bill eventually emerged from the Confederate Congress in March, but it had many restrictions, and it was too late to affect the outcome of the war.

In January 1865, Lincoln, who had been re-elected the previous November, sent Francis Blair as an emissary to Richmond, hoping to secure reunion without further bloodshed. Both sides agreed to a meeting at Fort Monroe, Virginia. Benjamin drafted vague instructions for the Southern delegation, led by Vice President Alexander Stephens, but Davis insisted on modifying them to refer to North and South as "two nations". This was the point that scuttled the Hampton Roads Conference; Lincoln would not consider the South a separate entity, insisting on union and emancipation.

== Escape ==
By March 1865, the Confederate military situation was desperate. Most major population centers had fallen, and General Lee's defense of Richmond was faltering against massive Union forces. Nevertheless, Benjamin retained his usual good humor; on the evening of April 1, with evacuation likely, he was at the State Department offices, singing a silly ballad of his own composition, "The Exit from Shocko Hill", a graveyard district located in Richmond. On April 2, Lee sent word that he could only keep Union troops away from the line of the Richmond and Danville Railroad—the only railroad still running out of Richmond—for a short time. Those who did not leave Richmond would be trapped. At 11:00 pm that night, the Confederate President and Cabinet left aboard a Danville-bound train. Navy Secretary Stephen R. Mallory recorded that Benjamin's "hope and good humor [was] inexhaustible ... with a 'never-give-up-the-ship' sort of air, referred to other great national causes which had been redeemed from far gloomier reverses than ours".

In Danville, Benjamin shared a room with another refugee, in the home of a banker. For a week, Danville served as capital of the Confederacy, until word came of Lee's surrender at Appomattox Court House. With no army to shield the Confederate government, it would be captured by Union forces within days, so Davis and his Cabinet, including Benjamin, fled south to Greensboro, North Carolina. Five minutes after the train passed over the Haw River, Union cavalry raiders burned the bridge, trapping the trains that followed Davis's.

Greensboro, fearing wrathful reprisal from the Union, gave the fugitives little hospitality, forcing Benjamin and the other Cabinet members to bunk in a railroad boxcar. Davis hoped to reach Texas, where rumor had it large Confederate forces remained active. The Cabinet met in Greensboro, and Generals Beauregard and Joseph E. Johnston sketched the bleak military situation. Davis, backed as usual by Benjamin, was determined to continue to fight. The refugee government moved south on April 15. With the train tracks cut, most Cabinet members rode on horseback, but the heavyset Benjamin declared he would not ride on one until he had to, and shared an ambulance with Jules St. Martin and others. For the entertainment of his companions, Benjamin recited Tennyson's "Ode on the Death of the Duke of Wellington".

In Charlotte, Benjamin stayed in the home of a Jewish merchant as surrender negotiations dragged. Here, Benjamin abandoned Davis's plan to fight on, telling him and the Cabinet that the cause was hopeless. When negotiations failed, Benjamin was part of the shrunken remnant of associates that moved on with Davis. The party reached Abbeville, South Carolina on May 2, and Benjamin told Davis that he wanted to separate from the presidential party temporarily, and go to the Bahamas to be able to send instructions to foreign agents before rejoining Davis in Texas. According to historian William C. Davis, "the pragmatic Secretary of State almost certainly never had any intention of returning to the South once gone". When he bade John Reagan goodbye, the postmaster general asked where Benjamin was going. "To the farthest place from the United States, if it takes me to the middle of China."

With one companion, Benjamin travelled south in a poor carriage, pretending to be a Frenchman who spoke no English. He had some gold with him, and left much of it for the support of relatives. He was traveling in the same general direction as the Davis party, but evaded capture whereas Davis was taken by Union troops. Benjamin reached Monticello, Florida, on May 13 to learn Union troops were in nearby Madison. Benjamin decided to continue alone on horseback, east and south along Florida's Gulf Coast, pretending to be a South Carolina farmer. John T. Lesley, James McKay, and C. J. Munnerlyn assisted in hiding Benjamin in a swamp, before eventually transporting him to Gamble Mansion in Ellenton, on the southwest coast of Florida. (Note: The Judah P. Benjamin Confederate Memorial at Gamble Plantation Historic State Park, established in 1925 at this site, recalls Benjamin and his escape from the collapsing Confederacy.) From there, assisted by the blockade runner Captain Frederick Tresca, he reached Bimini in the Bahamas. His escape from Florida to England was not without hardship: at one point he pretended to be a Jewish cook on Tresca's vessel, to deceive American soldiers who inspected it—one of whom stated it was the first time he had seen a Jew do menial labor. The small sponge-carrying vessel on which he left Bimini bound for Nassau exploded on the way, and he and the three black crewmen eventually managed to return to Bimini. Tresca's ship was still there, and he chartered it to take him to Nassau. From there, he took a ship for Havana, and on August 6, 1865, left there for Britain. He was not yet done with disaster; his ship caught fire after departing St. Thomas, and the crew put out the flames only with difficulty. On August 30, 1865, Judah Benjamin arrived at Southampton, in Britain.

== Career in England ==
Benjamin spent a week in London assisting Mason in winding up Confederate affairs. He then went to Paris to visit his wife and daughter for the first time since before the war. Friends in Paris urged him to join a mercantile firm there, but Benjamin felt that such a career would be subject to interference by Seward and the United States. Accordingly, Benjamin sought to shape his old course in a new country, resuming his legal career as an English barrister. Most of Benjamin's property had been destroyed or confiscated, and he needed to make a living for himself and his relatives. He had money in the United Kingdom as he had, during the war, purchased cotton for transport to Liverpool by blockade runner.

On January 13, 1866, Benjamin enrolled at Lincoln's Inn, and soon thereafter was admitted to read law under Charles Pollock, son of Chief Baron Charles Edward Pollock, who took him as a pupil at his father's direction. Benjamin, despite his age of 54, was initially required, like his thirty-years-younger peers, to attend for twelve terms, that is, three years. According to Benjamin's obituary in The Times, though, "the secretary of the Confederacy was dispensed from the regular three years of unprofitable dining, and called to the bar" on June 6, 1866.

Once qualified as a barrister, Benjamin chose to join the Northern Circuit, as it included Liverpool, where his connections in New Orleans and knowledge of mercantile affairs would do him the most good. In an early case, he defended two former Confederate agents against a suit by the United States to gain assets said to belong to that nation. Although he lost that case (United States v Wagner) (Note: United States v. Wagner, L.R. 2 Ch. App. 582 (1867).) on appeal, he was successful against his former enemies in United States v McRae (1867). (Note: United States v. McRae, L.R. 3 Ch. App. 79 (1867).) He had need of rapid success, as most of his remaining assets were lost in the collapse of the firm of Overend, Gurney and Company. He was reduced to penning columns on international affairs for The Daily Telegraph.

According to Justice Ruth Bader Ginsburg, "repeating his Louisiana progress, Benjamin made his reputation among his new peers by publication". In an early representation, he wrote a complex governing document for an insurance firm that other counsel had declined despite the substantial fee, due to the early deadline. After brief study, Benjamin wrote out the document, never making a correction or erasure. In 1868, Benjamin published A Treatise on the Law of Sale of Personal Property, With Reference to the American Decisions, to the French Code, and Civil Law. This work, known for short as Benjamin on Sales, became a classic in both Britain and America, and launched his career as a barrister. It went through three editions prior to Benjamin's death in 1884; an eighth edition was published in 2010. Today Benjamin's Sale of Goods forms part of the "common law library" of key practitioner texts on English civil law.

In 1867, Benjamin had been indicted in Richmond, along with Davis, Lee, and others, for waging war against the United States. The indictment was soon quashed. Davis visited London in 1868, free on bail, and Benjamin advised him not to take legal action against the author of a book that had angered Davis, as it would only give the book publicity. Benjamin corresponded with Davis, and met with him on the former rebel president's visits to Europe during Benjamin's lifetime, though the two were never as close as they had been during the war.

Benjamin was created a "Palatine silk", entitled to the precedence of a Queen's Counsel within Lancashire, in July 1869. There was a large creation of Queen's Counsel in early 1872, but Benjamin was not included; it was stated in his Times obituary that he had put his name forward. Later that year, he argued the case of Potter v Rankin (Note: Rankin v. Potter, L.R. 6 H.L. 83 (1873).) before the House of Lords and so impressed Lord Hatherley that a patent of precedence was soon made out, giving Benjamin the privileges of a Queen's Counsel. As he became prominent as a barrister, he discontinued practice before juries (at which he was less successful) in favor of trials or appeals before judges. In his last years in practice, he demanded an additional fee of 100 guineas (£105) to appear in any court besides the House of Lords and the Privy Council. In 1875, he was made a bencher of Lincoln's Inn.

In 1881, Benjamin represented Arthur Orton, the Tichborne claimant, before the House of Lords. (Note: Castro v. The Queen, 6 App. Cas. 229 (H.L. 1881), aff'g 5 Q.B. 490 (Ct. App. 1880), aff'g L.R. 9 Q.B. 350 (1874).) Orton, a butcher from Wagga Wagga, New South Wales, had claimed to be Sir Roger Tichborne, a baronet who had vanished some years previously, and Orton had perjured himself in the course of defending his claim. Benjamin sought to overturn the sentence of 14 years passed on Orton, but was not successful.

=== Decline and death ===
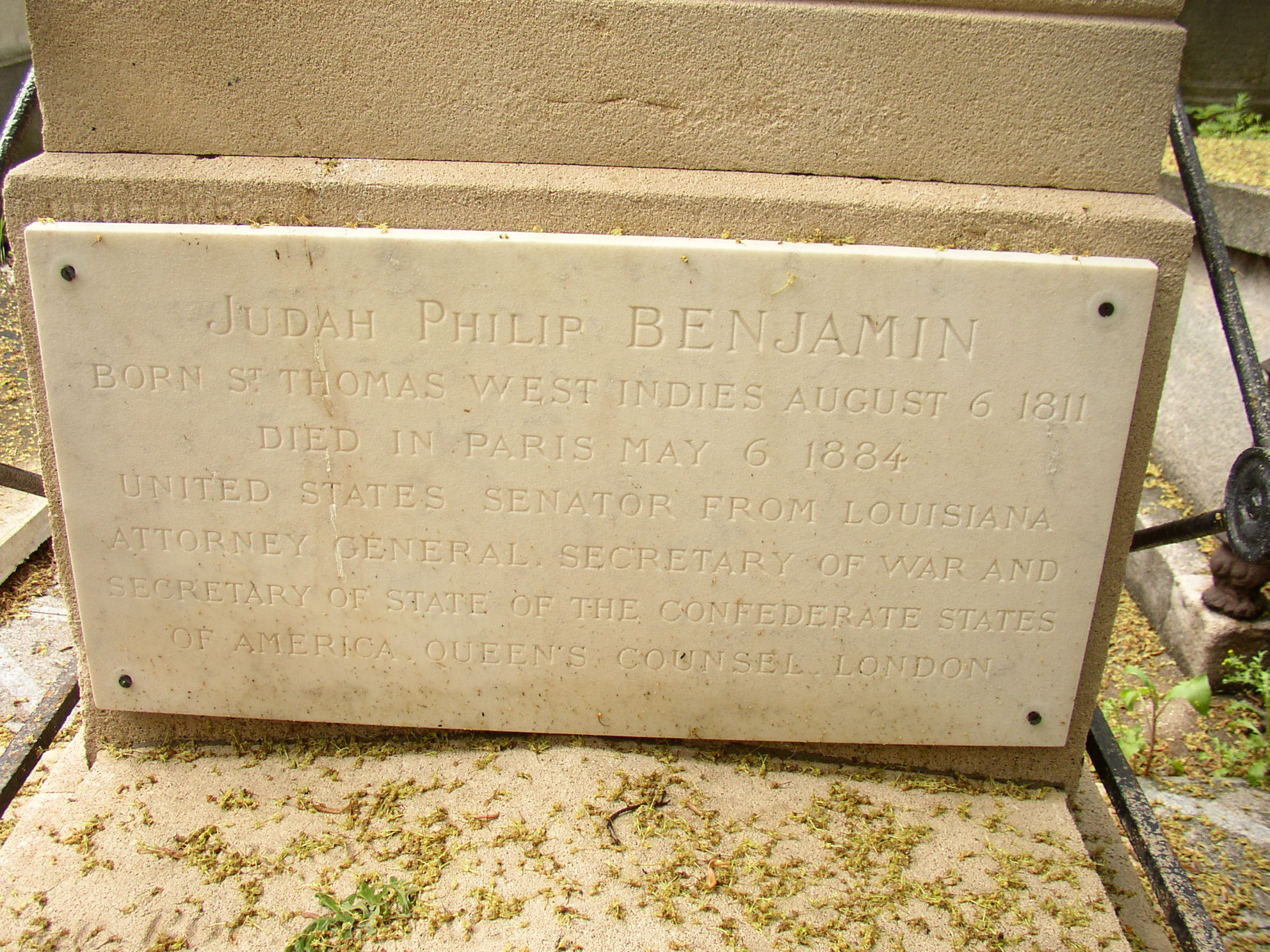
Benjamin's grave at Père Lachaise Cemetery in Paris

In his final years, Benjamin suffered from health issues. In 1880, he was badly injured in a fall from a tram in Paris. He also developed diabetes. He suffered a heart attack in Paris at the end of 1882, and his doctor ordered him to retire. His health improved enough to allow him to travel to London in June 1883 for a dinner in his honor attended by the English bench and bar. He returned to Paris and suffered a relapse of his heart trouble in early 1884. Natalie Benjamin had the last rites of the Catholic Church administered to her Jewish husband before his death in Paris on May 6, 1884, and funeral services were held in a church prior to Judah Benjamin's interment at Père Lachaise Cemetery in the St. Martin family crypt. His grave did not bear his name until 1938, when a plaque was placed by the Paris chapter of the United Daughters of the Confederacy.

== Appraisal ==
Benjamin was the first U.S. senator to profess the Jewish faith. In 1845, David Yulee, born David Levy, his second cousin, had been sworn in for Florida, but he renounced Judaism and eventually formally converted to Christianity. As an adult, Benjamin married a non-Jew, was not a member of a synagogue, and took no part in communal affairs. He rarely spoke of his Jewish background publicly, but was not ashamed of it. Some of the stories told of Benjamin that touch on this subject come from Rabbi Isaac Mayer Wise, who referred to an address Benjamin delivered in a San Francisco synagogue on Yom Kippur in 1860, though whether this occurred is open to question as Wise was not there and it was not reported in the city's Jewish newspaper. One quote from Senate debate that remains "part of the Benjamin legend", according to Evans, followed an allusion to Moses as a freer of slaves by a Northern senator, hinting that Benjamin was an "Israelite in Egyptian clothing". Benjamin is supposed to have replied, "It is true that I am a Jew, and when my ancestors were receiving their Ten Commandments from the immediate hand of deity, amidst the thunderings and lightnings of Mount Sinai, the ancestors of my opponent were herding swine in the forests of Great Britain." However, this anecdote is likely apocryphal as the same exchange between British Prime Minister Benjamin Disraeli and Daniel O'Connell took place in the House of Commons in 1835.

Edgar M. Kahn, in his journal article on the 1860 California sojourn, wrote, "Benjamin's life is an example of a man's determination to overcome almost insurmountable barriers by industry, perseverance, and intelligent use of a remarkable brain." This brilliance was recognized by contemporaries; Salomon de Rothschild, in 1861, deemed Benjamin "the greatest mind" in North America. Nevertheless, according to Meade, "he was given to quixotic enthusiasms and was sometimes too cocksure of his knowledge." Ginsburg said of Benjamin, "he rose to the top of the legal profession twice in one lifetime, on two continents, beginning his first ascent as a raw youth and his second as a fugitive minister of a vanquished power." Davis, after Benjamin's death, deemed him the most able member of his Cabinet, and said that the lawyer's postwar career had fully vindicated his confidence in him.

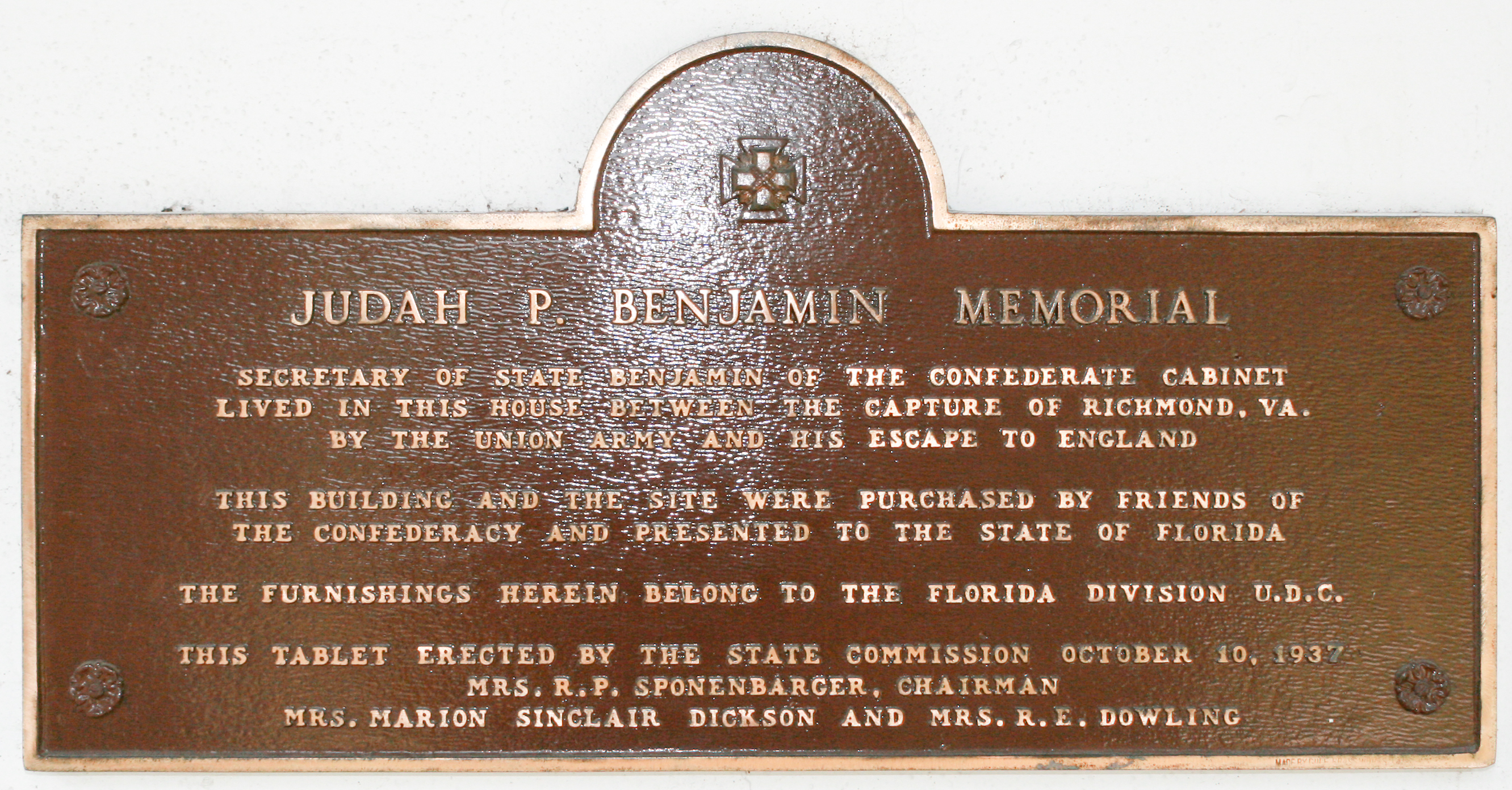
Memorial plaque to Benjamin, Gamble Plantation Historic State Park, Ellenton, Florida

According to Brook, "in every age, a heroic sage struggles to rescue Benjamin from obscurity—and invariably fails." Benjamin left no memoir and destroyed his personal papers, by which "the task of future researchers and historians was made exceedingly difficult and laborious".

After his death, Benjamin was rarely written about, in contrast to Davis and other Confederate leaders. Partly this was due to Benjamin depriving his potential biographers of source material, but even Davis, in his two-volume war memoir, mentions him only twice. Evans suggests that as Davis wrote the books in part to defend and memorialize his place in history, it would not have been characteristic of him to give much credit to Benjamin. Davis, in the midst of postwar business struggles, may have resented Benjamin's success as a barrister, or may have feared that allegations of involvement in Lincoln's assassination would again be made against the two men. Brook concurs that Benjamin's postwar success, that began as Davis lay in prison and other Confederates struggled for survival, may have soured Southerners towards the former secretary, but that anti-Semitism was also likely a factor. "For the guardians of Confederate memory after Reconstruction, Benjamin became a kind of pet Jew, generally ignored, but then trotted out at opportune moments to defend the segregated South against charges of bigotry." He has featured in fiction; Benjamin's fictional afterlife has been discussed by Michael Hoberman, who notes how the man's "many mysteries" have appealed to novelists as well as historians.

Those writing on Jewish history were reluctant to glorify a slaveowner, and reacted to Benjamin's story with "embarrassed dismay". This was especially so in the two generations following 1865 when the question of the Civil War remained an active issue in American politics. It was not until the 1930s that Benjamin began to be mentioned as a significant figure in the history of the United States, and in the chronicle of the Jews there. Nevertheless, Tom Mountain, in his 2009 article on Benjamin, points out that Benjamin was respected in the South as a leader of the rebel cause for a century after the Civil War, and that Southern schoolchildren who could not name the current Secretary of State in Washington knew about Benjamin. Reform Rabbi Daniel Polish noted in 1988 that Benjamin "represent[ed] a significant dilemma [in] my years growing up as a Jew both proud of his people and with an intense commitment to the ideals of liberalism and human solidarity that I found embodied in the civil rights movement." A monument was installed in 1948 in Charlotte, North Carolina, commemorating Benjamin. It was removed in 2020 amid the George Floyd protests..

Berman recounts a story that during the Civil War, Benjamin was called to the Torah at Beth Ahabah synagogue in Richmond. However, there is no proof of this, nor does Benjamin's name appear in any surviving record of the Jews of that city. "But whether or not Benjamin practiced Judaism overtly or contributed to Jewish causes, to the Jews of the South, he was a symbol of a coreligionist who was a man among men". According to Evans, "Benjamin survives, as he willed it: a shadowy figure in Civil War history". Kahn noted that Benjamin "is epitomized as a foremost orator, lawyer, and statesman, without a peer at the bars of two of the world's greatest nations". Meade questioned whether Benjamin's character can ever be fully understood:

We can easily prove that Benjamin was the only genius in the Confederate cabinet. We can demonstrate that his career, with its American and English phases, was more glamorous than that of any other prominent Confederate. But we are still confronted by one perplexing problem: Judah P. Benjamin was an enigmatic figure—the most incomprehensible of all the Confederate leaders. Lee, Jackson, even Jefferson Davis, are crystal clear in comparison with the Jewish lawyer and statesman. The acrimonious debate about his character began before the Civil War and has not ceased to this day.

== See also ==
- Oscar Straus (politician), the first Jewish member of the United States Cabinet
- List of United States senators born outside the United States
- List of Hispanic and Latino Americans in the United States Congress
- List of Jewish members of the United States Congress

== Written works ==
- Benjamin, J. P. (1858). Kansas Bill. Speech of Hon. J. P. Benjamin, of La., delivered in Senate of United States on Thursday, March 11, 1858.—Slavery protected by the Common Law of the New World.—Guaranteed by Constitution.—Vindication of the Supreme Court of the U.S. Washington, D.C.: Washington, G.S. Gideon, printer.
- Benjamin, J. P. (1860). Defence of the national democracy against the attack of Judge Douglas—constitutional rights of the states. Speech of Hon. J. P. Benjamin, of LA—Delivered in the Senste of the United States, May 22, 1860.
- Benjamin, J. P. (1860). Defence of the national Democracy against the attack of Judge Douglas--constitutional rights of the states. Speech of Hon. J. P. Benjamin, of Louisiana. Delivered in the Senate of the United States, May 22, 1860. [Washington] Printed by L. Towers.
- Benjamin, J. P. (1861). Speech of Hon. J. P. Benjamin, of Louisiana, on the right of secession. Delivered in the Senate of the United States, Dec. 31, 1860. Washington, Printed by L. Towers.
- Benjamin, J. P. (1861) [September 12, 1861]. "Instructions to Receivers under the Act entitled "An Act for the Sequestration of the Estates, property and Effects of Alien Enemies, and for the indemnity of citizens of the Confederate States, and persons aiding the same in the existing war against the United States." — Approved 30th August, 1861". An act for the sequestration of the property of alien enemies, adopted August 30, 1861. Richmond, Virginia: Richmond Tyler, Wise, Allegre & Smith. pp. 13–15.
- Benjamin, Judah; Pearson, Arthur Beilby; Boyd, Hugh Fenwick; Kerr, James M. (1888). Benjamin's Treatise on the law of sale of personal property, with references to the American decisions, and to the French code and civil law. Third edition. Brought down to the end of the year 1883 (with the author's sanction and revision) by Arthur Beilby Pearson, B.A., (of Trinity Hall, Cambridge) and Hugh Fenwick, [sic] Boyd, (Of Brasenose College, Oxford), of the Inner Temple, Barristers–at–Law. With American notes by James M. Kerr, Editor of "American and English Railroad Cases", and the"American and English Corporate Cases" (3rd ed.). Boston: Charles H. Edson & Co.
- Benjamin, J. P.; Bennett, Edmund H. (1888). Benjamin's Treatise on the Law of Sale of Personal Property; with References to the American Decisions and to the French Code and Civil Law. By J. P. Benjamin, Esq., Q. C. Of Lincoln's Inn, Barrister–at–Law. From the latest English edition. With American notes entirely re-written. By Edmund H. Bennett, LL.D. Dean of the Boston University Law School. Boston: Houghton, Mifflin & Company.

U.S. Senate
| Preceded by Solomon Downs | United States Senator (Class 2) from Louisiana; 1853–1861; Served alongside: Pierre Soulé, John Slidell | Vacant Title next held by John Harris^{(1)} |
| Preceded by John Pettit | Chair of the Senate Private Land Claims Committee; 1855–1861 | Succeeded by Ira Harris |
Legal offices
| New office | Confederate States Attorney General; 1861 | Succeeded by Wade Keyes; Acting |
Political offices
| Preceded by LeRoy Walker | Confederate States Secretary of War; 1861–1862 | Succeeded by George Randolph |
| Preceded by William Browne; Acting | Confederate States Secretary of State; 1862–1865 | Position abolished |
Notes and references
1. Because of Louisiana's secession, the Senate seat was vacant for seven years.
