= Adolph Rinck =

French-American portrait painter

- Born: Louis Nicholas Adolphe Rinck; February 26, 1802; Metz, Moselle, France
- Died: June 24, 1895 (aged 93); New York City, New York, US
- Education: Prussian Academy of Arts; École des Beaux-Arts
- Known for: Portraiture
- Notable work: Woman in Tignon

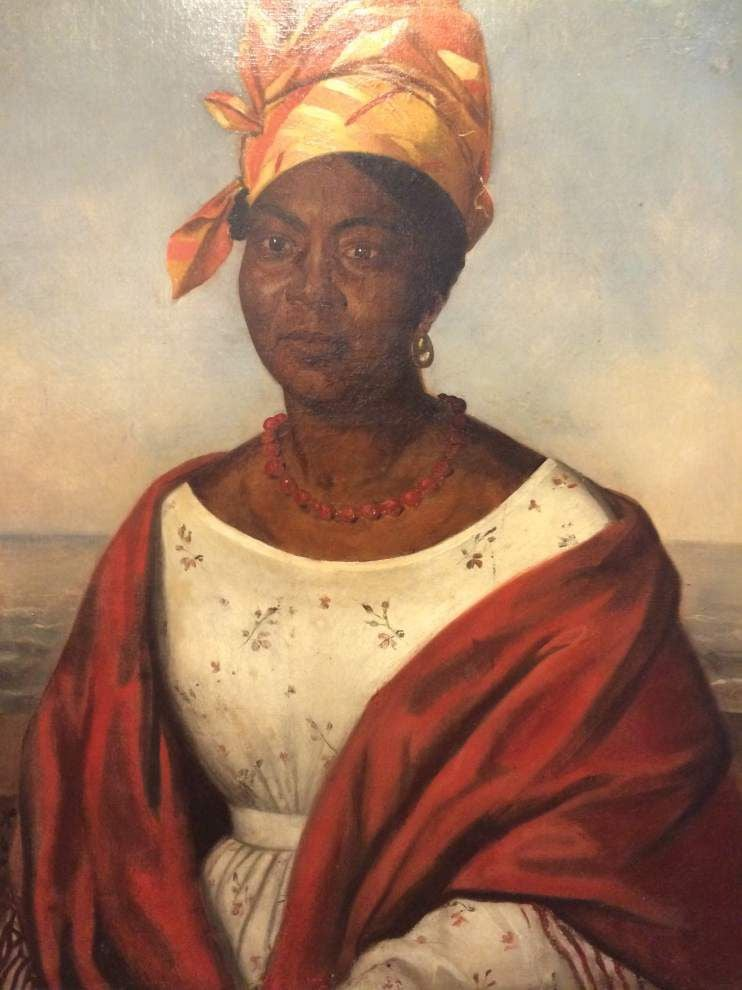
Woman in Tignon (1844) was painted by Rinck during his time in New Orleans.

Louis Nicholas Adolphe Rinck, frequently identified as Adolph D. Rinck, (February 26, 1802 – June 24, 1895) was a portrait painter active in New Orleans throughout the mid-19th century.

Rinck was born in Metz, France. His father was a Hessian officer. He studied at the Prussian Academy of Arts in Berlin starting in the 1820s before enrolling in the École des Beaux-Arts in Paris in 1835 to study with Thomas Couture. While in Berlin and Paris, he painted several notable portraits, including of Prussian statesman Friedrich Ancillon and of Claude Monet's parents.

By December 1840, Rinck had relocated to New Orleans, taking out an advertisement in The New Orleans Bee promoting his services and describing himself as a friend of Jean Joseph Vaudechamp. During his time in the city, he painted portraits of a number of prominent New Orleanians, including Judah Touro, Judah P. Benjamin, Joshua Baker, and Edward Pilsbury, as well as John Woodhouse Audubon, Charles Sumner, and several members of the Grevemberg family. He also painted portraits of others whose name has been lost, such as in Woman In Tignon. In addition to painting, Rinck taught lessons in painting and drawing.

Rinck brought a French academic style of painting to New Orleans that represented a shift in styles from other French painters who'd come to the growing city seeking work. He put greater emphasis on anatomical details and a more dramatic focus on the sitter.

In 1855, Rinck purchased a large plot of land in Algiers, New Orleans, near English Turn with the aim of developing a model farm to teach plantation management and scientific agriculture. After the Civil War, he sought support from the Louisiana state legislature for his planned school, but proved unsuccessful. He left New Orleans around 1871 with the intent to return to Europe but ended up remaining in New York City until his death in June 1895.
