= Erlanger (surname) =

Erlanger is a German-Jewish surname derived from the city of Erlangen. Notable people with the surname include:

- A. L. Erlanger (1859–1930), American theatrical producer and director
- Camille Erlanger (1863–1919), French composer
- Jeff Erlanger (1970–2007), American activist
- Joseph Erlanger (1874–1965), American physiologist
- Steven Erlanger (born c. 1952), American journalist
- Fernanda Erlanger Rodrigues (born 1979), Brazilian actress and television presenter

and members of the German-French-English banking dynasty (Barons d'Erlanger, see: Erlanger family tree), including:

- Frédéric Émile d'Erlanger (1832–1911), German financier
  - Emile Beaumont Baron d’Erlanger (1866–1939), banker, musician ⚭ Catherine, Baroness d'Erlanger, née Catherine Robert d'Aqueria de Rochegude
    - Gérard John Leo Regis Baron d’Erlanger (1905–1962), partner of Erlanger Ltd. and Myers & Co
  - Frédéric Alfred Baron d’Erlanger (Freddy, 1868–1943), banker and composer
  - Francois Rodolphe Baron d’Erlanger (1872–1932), French painter, orientalist and musicologist specializing in Arabic music, built Ennejma Ezzahra Palace near Tunis
    - Leo Frédéric Alfred Baron d'Erlanger (1898–1978), banker in London (Erlanger Ltd.), sold the bank in 1958 to Hill, Samuel & Co, then Philip Hill Higginson Erlanger Ltd
- Carlo von Erlanger (1872–1904), German ornithologist and explorer

== See also ==
- Erlanger (disambiguation)
