= D'Erlanger =

D'Erlanger (a frankified form of a German name meaning "from Erlangen") may refer to:

- Frédéric Emile d'Erlanger (1832–1911), a German banker
- Emile Erlanger and Company, the bank he established
- Baron Emile Beaumont d'Erlanger (1866–1939), an Anglo-French banker and railroad tycoon
- Baron Frédéric Alfred d'Erlanger (1868–1943), an Anglo-French composer and banker
- Baron Rodolphe d'Erlanger (1872–1932), a French painter and musicologist
- D'erlanger, a Japanese rock band
  - D'erlanger (album), their eponymous 5th album
