= Émile d'Erlanger =

Emile d'Erlanger may refer to:

- Frédéric Emile d'Erlanger, Franco-German banker
- Baron Emile Beaumont d'Erlanger, his Anglo-French son
- Emile Erlanger and Company, their family bank
