= Leo Frédéric Alfred Baron d'Erlanger =

British banker (1898–1978)

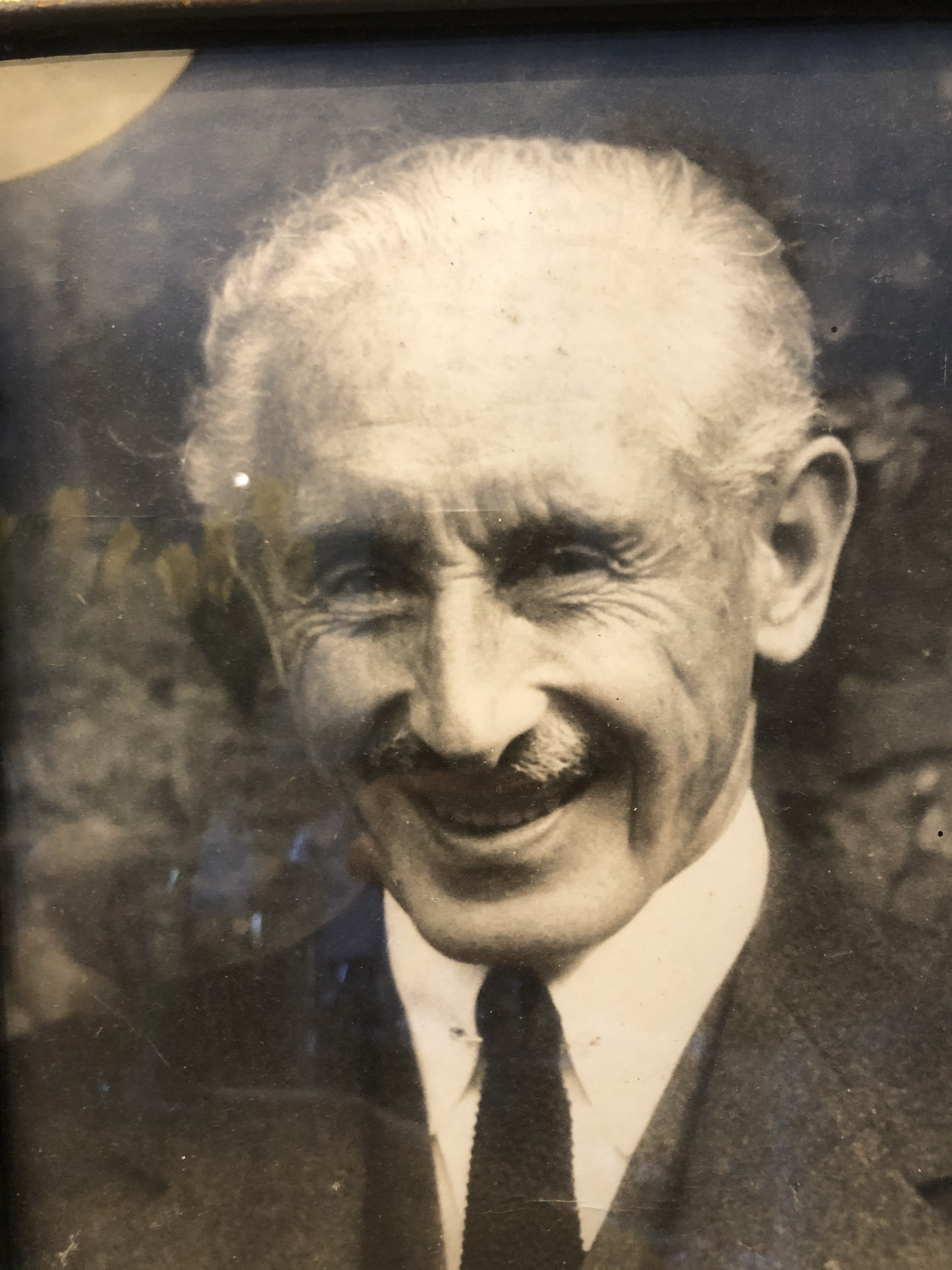
- Born: 2 July 1898; London, England
- Died: 25 October 1978 (aged 80); Geneva, Switzerland
- Education: Eton College
- Occupation: Banker
- Spouse: Edwina Prue (1929)
- Children: Tess Edwina May Baroness d'Erlanger, Rodolphe Frédéric Baron d'Erlanger
- Parents: Rodolphe François Baron d'Erlanger (father); Countess Maria Elisabetha Cleofee Scolastica Barbiellini-Amidei (mother)
- Relatives: Baron Frédéric Émile d'Erlanger (Grandfather) Baron Raphael von Erlanger (Great-Grandfather) John Slidell (Great-Grandfather)
- Family: Erlanger

Leo Frédéric Alfred Baron d'Erlanger (2 July 1898 – 25 October 1978) was an English merchant banker and air transport promoter, co-founder of British Airways, Chairman of the Erlanger Bank and of the Channel Tunnel Company.

== Business ==
Baron Leo Frédéric Alfred d'Erlanger was a merchant banker and a promoter of the British aircraft industry. In 1947 he was also Chairman of the Channel Tunnel Company, the later Eurotunnel. The design of the Channel Tunnel and subsequent parts of the project were financed by the family bank.

Like his ancestors, he devoted himself to the banking business. In 1919, Leo entered the family-owned Erlanger Bank, under the Chairmanship of his uncle, Baron Emile Beaumont d’Erlanger, becoming a partner in 1927, a Director in 1939, and finally chairman in 1944. Through the family bank, Leo was official banker to the Greek government.

In 1933, when Vogue proprietor Conde Nast was threatened with bankruptcy, Leo d’Erlanger arranged finance with Lord Camrose and enabled Nast to regain control of Vogue and Vanity Fair.

During the Second World War, d’Erlanger invested in military aircraft, working with Barnes Wallis, and Fred Winterbotham, who together conceived the Bouncing Bomb. He also helped the development of International Alloys and Mulberry Harbours.

A natural entrepreneur, d’Erlanger was interested in early civil aviation, starting in 1926 with Imperial Airways then acquiring shares in Hillman Airways and, through holdings in Whitehall Securities, gaining an interest in Spartan Airlines. Along with Clive Pearson in 1935, these companies were merged to form British Airways of which his cousin, Sir Gérard John Leo Regis Baron d'Erlanger was appointed chairman.

Leo was also a board member of the British South African Chartered Company as well as the International Sleeping-Car Company - the historical operator of the Orient Express.

In 1958, he oversaw the takeover of bank by the Merchant Bank Philip Hill Higginson under the leadership of their partner Kenneth Keith. The name of the bank was then changed to Philip Hill Higginson Erlanger Ltd. However, there soon followed a falling out with Keith, (later Baron Keith of Castleacre) known for his aggressive business practices, who refused to accept Leo d'Erlanger as chairman of the group. In 1965 the bank merged with private bank M Samuel to become Hill Samuel & Co, which was subsequently taken over by TSB Group Plc. in 1987, which itself merged with Lloyds Bank to become Lloyds TSB in 1995.

== Family and personal life ==
Baron Leo d'Erlanger, born in Hamilton Place, London, was the only child of painter and musicologist Rodolphe François Baron d'Erlanger and his wife Maria Elisabetha Cleofee Scolastica Countess Barbiellini-Amidei, from old Tuscan nobility. Since his maternal grandfather Count Barbiellini-Amidei l'Elmi and had been chamberlain of Pope Leo XIII, Pope Leo agreed to be godfather to Leo d'Erlanger and his namesake.

His paternal grandparents were the banker and railroad financier Frédéric Emile Baron d'Erlanger (1832-1911) and his American grandmother Marguérite Mathilde Slidell (the daughter of the influential American lawyer, businessman and Senator John Slidell). His maternal grandmother was American Harriet Lewis, born in New London, Connecticut.

His great-grandfather was banker Baron Raphael von Erlanger, founder of the family bank, Erlanger & Sons. He also founded various other banks including; Weimarische Bank, Homburger Bank (sold to Dresdner Bank), International Bank in Luxembourg, Oldenburgische Landesbank, Frankfurter Hypothekenbank (now part of Hypothekenbank Frankfurt) and others. He was Portuguese and Scandinavian Consul General, court banker and the confidant of numerous German and foreign princes. In 1876 he donated the Kaiserbrunnen, one of the most famous streets in Frankfurt am Main.

Leo had three uncles; Baron Raphael Slidell d'Erlanger a German zoologist, Baron Frédéric Alfred d'Erlanger (29 May 1868 – 23 April 1943[1]) an Anglo-French composer, banker and patron of the arts and Baron Emile Beaumont d'Erlanger (4 June 1866 – 24 July 1939) a merchant banker.

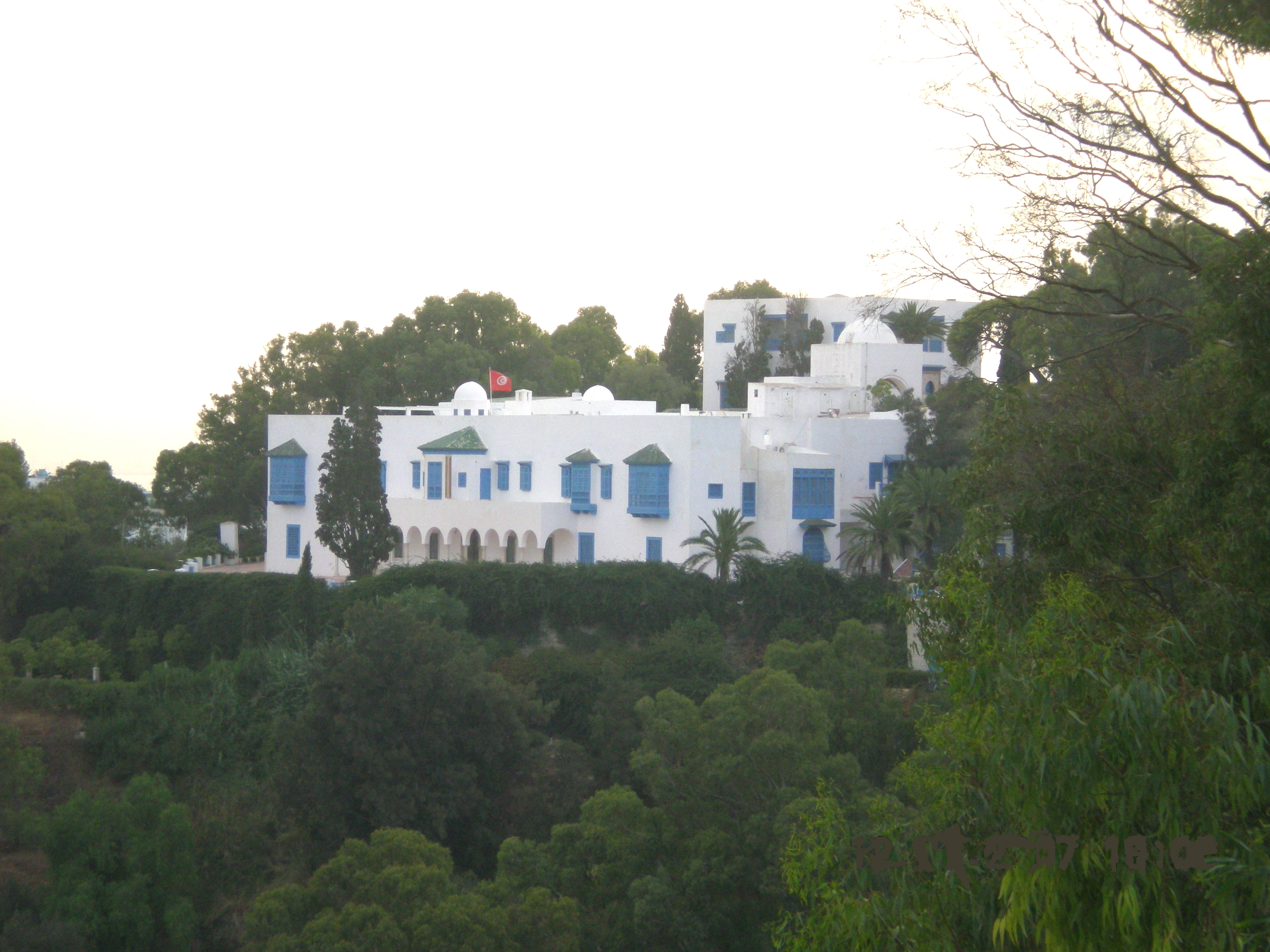
Palace Ennejma Ezzahra in Tunisia

Leo d'Erlanger spent most of his early childhood in France, but in 1910, due to his father's poor health, his parents moved to Sidi Bou Saïd in Tunisia and built the Ennejma Ezzahra Palace, which he later inherited.

In 1911, Leo attended Eton College where he befriended Esmond Harmsworth, 2nd Viscount Rothermere, the British Conservative politician and press magnate, and in 1920 acted as his best man. During his time at Eton, his holidays were spent with his uncle, the composer, Baron Frédéric Alfred d'Erlanger, at Parkhouse, no.24 Rutland Gate, Knightsbridge.

In 1916, he attended Sandhurst Military Academy. Second Lieutenant Leo d’Erlanger joined the Grenadier Guards serving under Lieutenant Colonel Viscount Gort. From July to November 1918 he saw action on the Western Front and suffered shellshock.

As a young man, d’Erlanger was a friend of Ettore Bugatti, owning several of his models. His 1928 Bugatti Type 44 Fiacre later turned up among Michel Dovaz's famous ‘sleeping beauties’.

Baron Leo stated in his Will that he wished for his coffin to be carried on the first train to pass through the Channel Tunnel which was opened in 1994, however the authorities would not permit this.

== Marriage ==
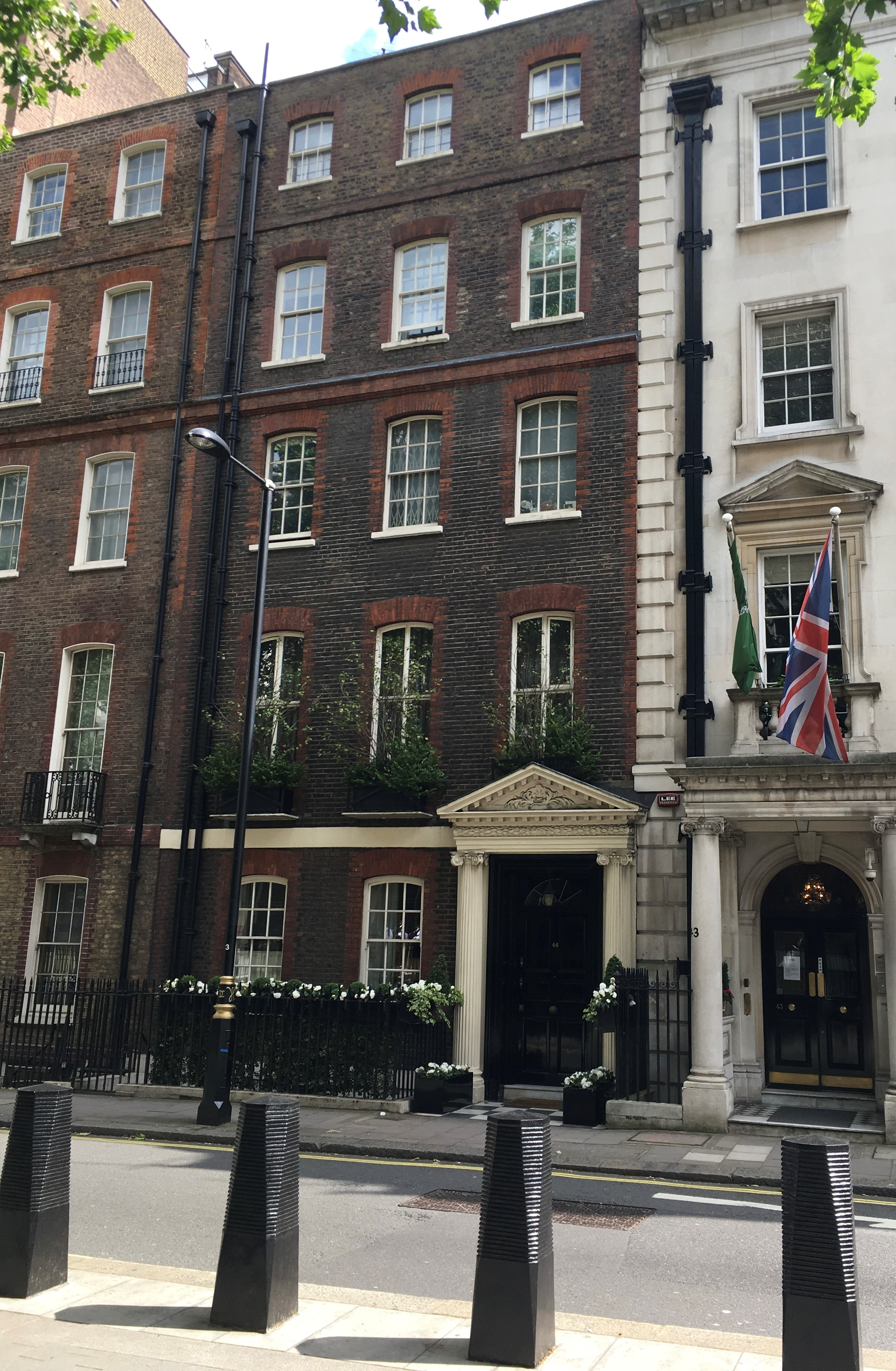
44 Upper Grosvenor Street

Leo d'Erlanger married Edwina Prue (born 1907 in New York City; died 18 August 1994 in Geneva) an American in 1929. She had previously been junior editor of Vanity Fair magazine for Clare Boothe Luce in New York City, top model of Jean Patou's haute couture house in Paris and legendary ballroom dancer under the name Edwina Saint Clair. She was the older sister of Mary Warburg, member of the Warburg banking family.

The couple lived at 44 Upper Grosvenor Street, Mayfair, London. In 1935, Vogue told its readers that "the new house all London is talking about is Mrs. Leo d'Erlanger's in Upper Grosvenor Street, for it's unlike anything London has ever seen."

Leo and Edwina left Great Britain in 1974 and lived between Geneva and their Palace, Ennejma Ezzahra, in Sidi Bou Saïd, northeast of Tunis, where Leo invested in olive oil production.

== Descendants ==
- Tess Edwina May Baroness d'Erlanger (1934-14 August 2008 in Spelsbury, Oxfordshire)
  - Leo Alexandre d'Erlanger-Bertrand (born 1963)
    - Oliver Alexander d'Erlanger-Bertrand (born 1992)
      - Louis Leo James d'Erlanger-Bertrand (born 2022)
    - Rebecca Bunty d'Erlanger-Bertrand (born 1995)
- Rodolphe Frédéric Baron d'Erlanger (1945-2000), married in 1982 Lady Caroline Mary Cholmondeley, daughter of Sir George Hugh Cholmondeley, 6th Marquess of Cholmondeley
  - Leo Frédéric Hugh d'Erlanger (born 1983)
  - Joshua Robert David d'Erlanger (born 1987)

== See also ==
- Erlanger Health System
- Erlanger, Kentucky
- The Black Paintings by Francisco Goya
