= Frédéric d'Erlanger =

Frédéric d'Erlanger may refer to:

- Frédéric Émile d'Erlanger (1832–1911), French banker from Germany
- Frédéric Alfred d'Erlanger (1868–1943), his son, English banker from France who was also a composer
