= Wildgust v Bank of Ireland =

Irish Supreme Court case

Harold Wildgust and Carrickowen Ltd v Bank of Ireland and Norwich Union Assurance
- Coat of arms of Ireland
- Court: Supreme Court of Ireland
- Decided: 22 March 2006
- Citation: [2006] IESC 19; [2006] 2 ILRM 28; [2006] 1 IR 570; [2007] 3 IR 39
- Transcript: https://www.bailii.org/ie/cases/IESC/2006/S19.html

Case history
- Appealed from: High Court
- Appealed to: Supreme Court

Court membership
- Judges sitting: Denham J., Geoghegan J., Kearns J

Case opinions
- Ruled that a life insurer was liable to the plaintiff policyholder for informing a third party bank, which had a security assignment over the policy, that the premiums on the policy were paid up-to-date when in fact a payment had been missed. Even though the bank never advised the plaintiff of this conversation, so that he did not rely on it, the insurer was found liable to the plaintiff for the loss resulting from the lapse of the policy.
- Decision by: Geoghegan J., Kearns J.,

Keywords
- Misstatement, Negligence, Fraud, Insurance, Life Insurance

Harold Wildgust and Carrickowen Ltd v Bank of Ireland and Norwich Union Life Assurance [2006] IESC 19; [2006] 2 ILRM 28; [2006] 1 IR 570; [2007] 3 IR 39, is an Irish Supreme Court case where the court imposed liability on the defendants, Norwich Union Life Assurance for a negligent misstatement made on its part in respect of the plaintiffs Harold Wildgust and Carrickowen Ltd. The Supreme Court outlined the "proximity test" which is to be used in cases involving negligent misstatement and held that duty of care concerning negligent misstatement is not confined to the persons to whom the misstatement is actually made.

Ultimately, the court decided misstatement caused a policy of insurance to lapse, with a corresponding financial loss being suffered by the policy holder and plaintiff, Mr Wildgust.

== Background ==
The first plaintiff, Mr Harold Wildgust, is a businessman and one of the main owners, of the second named plaintiff, who was a company called Carrickowen Ltd. This company was set up so that it could own two business spaces in the Coolock Industrial Estate. Mr Wildgust and his late wife wanted to set up a plan, the aim of which was to sublet smaller units within the commercial spaces at a rent high enough to cover the mortgage payments on the property itself and to create a pension fund for their retirement. Thus, they sought a loan of £215,000 from merchant bankers Hill Samuel.

Mr Wildgust and Mrs Wildgust were able to obtain the loan, with each of them providing a personal guarantee for the loan. The main security for the loan was a mortgage on the property in favour of Hill Samuel. Furthermore, they had to get insurance on both of their lives and give it to Hill Samuel. All of these deals went through successfully. At first, Mr. Wildgust set up an account with Allied Irish Bank so that all of the tenants' rent could be paid directly into that account. Later, this plan was changed so that rent would be paid into an account with Bank of Ireland. The bank also agreed that on the 23rd of each month, Norwich Union would receive a direct debit payment for the life insurance policy's monthly premiums.

In 1992, there was a problem because it was said that the payment due on March 23 had not been made. Mr. Wildgust blamed Bank of Ireland, but as the hearing went on, the two of them came to a deal, and Bank of Ireland was taken off the list of defendants. Since the March 1992 payment was supposedly missed, the life insurance policy was no longer valid. In April 1992, after learning that the direct debit hadn't been made, the manager of Hill Samuel phoned the second defendant, who claimed that the premium had been paid later when it hadn't. The manager believed this false information and did not do anything else to keep the policy from running out. When Mrs Wildgust died, the Norwich Union Life Assurance refused to pay the life insurance policy. This caused an internal processes to begin. The High Court agreed that Norwich Union Life Assurance had acted carelessly in carrying out the valuation of the house, which may have caused damage to the purchaser. However, it was decided that the plaintiffs would have had to have been actually misled by the statement and have relied on it for it to be reasonable to impose a duty of care.

The High Court dismissed plaintiffs' claim for damages for negligent misstatement against Norwich Union Life Assurance and their claim against the first defendant had already been settled between them. Thus, the case was then brought to the Supreme Court on appeal with respect to High Court ruling concerning Norwich Union.

== Holding of the Supreme Court ==
The court articulated the following three step test which is to be carried out when deciding whether a duty of care exists between a plaintiff and a defendant in a case concerning negligent misstatement:

- Firstly, it must be considered whether the relevant injury or damage to property was reasonably foreseeable.
- Secondly, the "proximity" or "neighbourhood" test must have been satisfied.
- Thirdly, it must be considered whether it is "just and reasonable that the law should impose a duty of a given scope on the defendant for the benefit of the plaintiff?"

The court allowed the appeal; it decided that in the context of negligent misstatement, the proximity test included persons who could be recognised as belonging to a "limited and identifiable class when the maker of the statement could reasonably expect... that reliance would be placed thereon by persons to act or not to act in a particular manner in relation to that transaction." The court acknowledged that the statement was not directly made to the plaintiffs but to a person identified with them; however, the court deemed that there was a "special relationship" between the plaintiffs and Norwich Union Life Assurance which was able to create a duty of care on that defendant to ensure that its statements were accurate. Further, the court decided that "the plaintiffs were, vis-à-vis the person giving the information, proximate neighbours who could foreseeably be damaged by the inaccuracy of the information."

According to the Supreme Court's ruling, a life insurer was responsible for the plaintiff policy holder because it misled a third party bank that had a security assignment over the policy into believing that all premium payments were current when in reality one had been missed. Although the bank did not tell the plaintiff about this conversation, and thus could not rely upon it, the insurer was found to be responsible for the plaintiff's loss when the policy ran out. In the view of the Supreme Court, the insurer should have been aware that the plaintiff was liable to be damaged as a consequence of their incorrect statement that the premiums were up to date, whether it was the assignee bank or the policy holder who received the incorrect information.
