= Rodolphe d'Erlanger =

Anglo-French painter and musicologist (1872–1932)

Rodolphe, Baron d'Erlanger
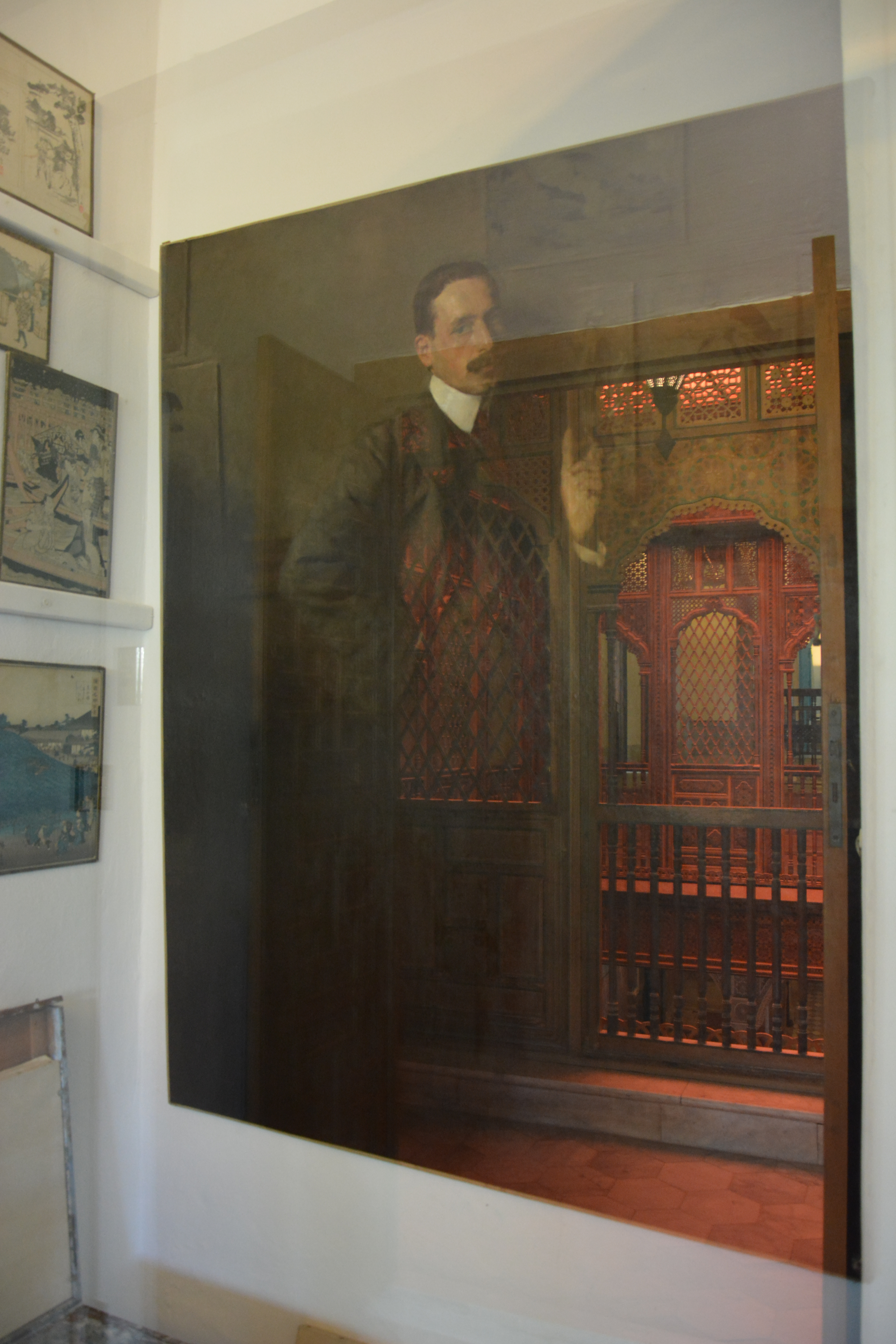
- Self-portrait at the Centre des Musiques Arabes et Méditerranéennes, Ennejma Ezzahra
- Born: Rodolphe François d'Erlanger; 7 June 1872; Boulogne-sur-Seine, Hauts-de-Seine, French Third Republic
- Died: 29 October 1932 (aged 60); Tunis, French protectorate of Tunisia
- Education: Académie Julian
- Occupations: Painter; musicologist
- Spouse: Countess Maria Elisabetha Cleofee Scolastica Barbiellini-Amidei
- Children: Leo Frédéric Alfred Baron d'Erlanger
- Parents: Frédéric Émile d'Erlanger (father); Marguerite Mathilde Slidell (mother)
- Relatives: John Slidell (maternal grandfather); Raphael Slidell, Baron d'Erlanger (brother); Emile Beaumont, Baron d'Erlanger (brother); Frédéric Alfred, Baron d'Erlanger (brother); Carlo von Erlanger (cousin)

Rodolphe François, Baron d'Erlanger (7 June 1872 – 29 October 1932) was a French painter and musicologist who specialised in the study of Tunisian and Arabic music.

== Life and artistic career ==
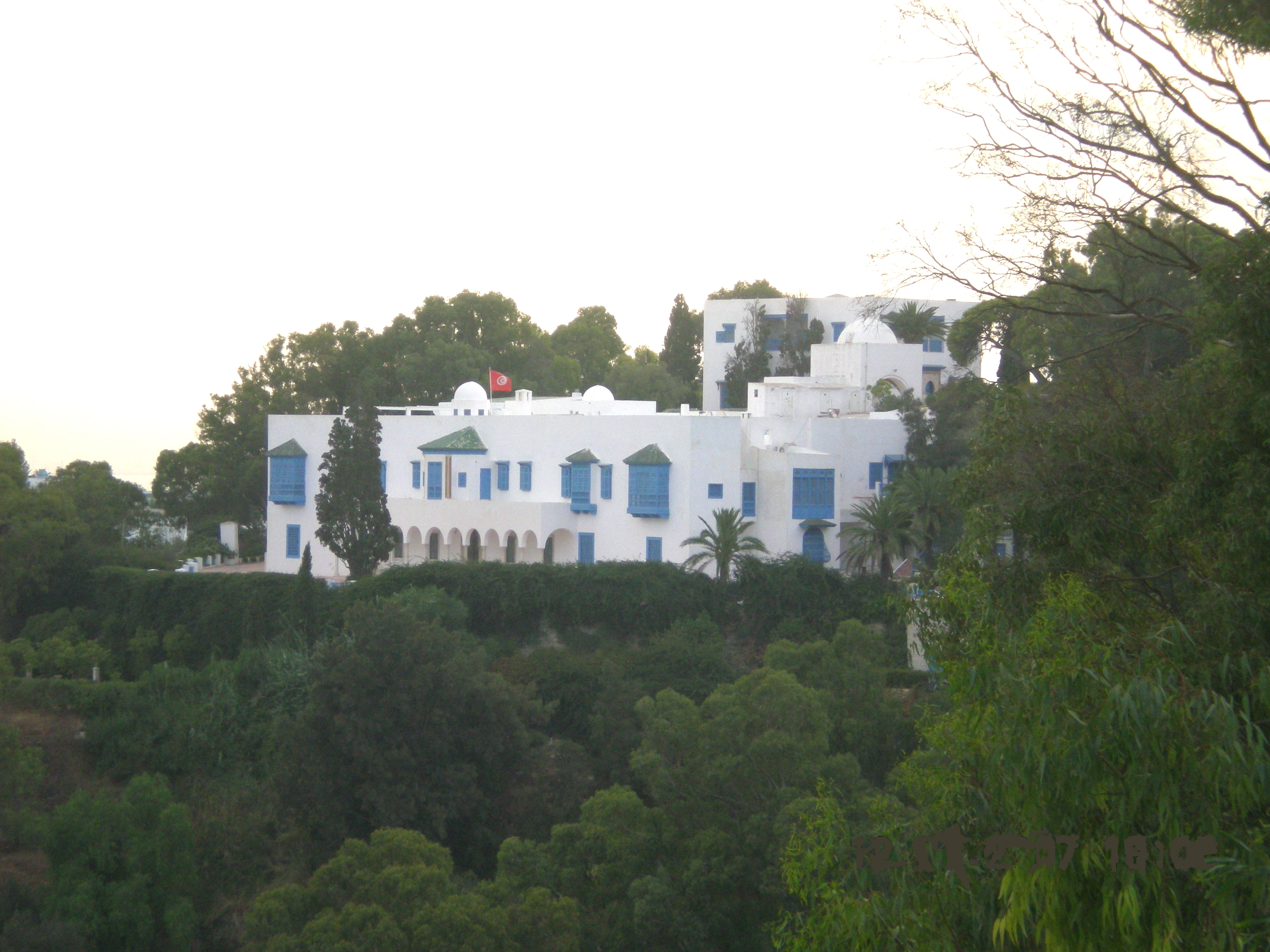
Ennejma Ezzahra Palace at Sidi Bou Saïd, Tunis

Rodolphe François Baron d'Erlanger was the fourth son of German-French private banker Baron Frédéric Émile d'Erlanger and his American wife Marguerite Mathilde Slidell (1842–1927), daughter of businessman and politician John Slidell. His eldest brother Raphael Slidell d'Erlanger (1865–1897) was a zoologist and professor at Heidelberg. The second brother was Baron Emile Beaumont d'Erlanger (1866–1939) who took over the bank's management. His third brother Baron Frédéric Alfred d'Erlanger (1868–1943) also became a banker, but acquired acclaim as a composer as well. (See: Erlanger family tree).

Baron Rodolphe d'Erlanger studied in Paris and London. He was married to the Italian countess Maria Elisabetta Barbiellini-Amidei. Their only son, Leo Frédéric Alfred Baron d'Erlanger (1898–1978), eventually became the head of the family-owned bank which he sold to Philip Hill Higginson Ltd. and its chairing partner Kenneth Keith, later Baron Keith of Castleacre, in 1958. The bank then became Philip Hill Higginson Erlanger Ltd., until a further fusion with M Samuel, then named Hill, Samuel & Co.

When the d'Erlanger family was threatened with internment as enemy aliens in Britain during the First World War, the artist John Lavery was outspoken in their support.

== Contribution to the study of Arabic music and art ==
His palace at Sidi Bou Said, in northern Tunisia, which he named Ennejma Ezzahra ("yellow star", sometimes spelled Nejma Ezzohara), was built between 1909 and 1921. The building is now a museum and houses the Centre des musiques arabes et méditerranéennes.

In the early 1930s and under the patronage of King Fuad I of Egypt, he was one of the persons who prepared the first Congress of Arabic Music in 1932 in Cairo. Although he was too ill to attend and died soon after, he sent an ensemble from Tunisia to perform at the congress in Cairo.

Apart from his collection of musical instruments, his studies on Arabic and especially North African music and sound recordings, he helped to revive the Tunisian musical genre known as ma'luf during the 1920s. His lasting contribution to the ethnomusicology of Arabic music, however, was the six-volume "La musique arabe", published in Paris in French and Arabic from 1930 onwards, and re-edited in 2001 with the support of the Institut du Monde Arabe in Paris.
