= Erlanger =

Erlanger may refer to:

- Erlanger (surname), a German surname
- Erlanger, Kentucky, a city in the United States
- Erlanger (crater), a lunar impact crater

== See also ==
- Erlanger program, a mathematical research program proposed by Felix Klein in 1872
- Klaw & Erlanger, a New York City based theatrical production partnership
- Erlanger Health System, a multi-hospital system with five campuses based in Chattanooga, Tennessee
