= Armand Lalande =

French wine merchant and writer (1820–1894)

(François Louis Marie) Armand Lalande LH

Deputy of Gironde
- In office 4 September 1881 – 14 October 1889

Personal details
- Born: 10 December 1820 Bordeaux, France
- Died: 25 September 1894 (aged 73) Bordeaux, France
- Party: Republican Union

Armand Lalande LH (10 December 1820 – 25 September 1894) was one of the most important and powerful French wine merchants and producers in the Bordeaux wine trade, a noted writer and publisher on economic affairs, and an influential politician in the Third French Republic. He founded Armand Lalande et Cie, one of the premier wine trading houses and dynasties in Bordeaux, and owned several officially classified château vineyard estates in Bordeaux.

== Political career ==
Armand Lalande was a municipal councillor of Bordeaux (1852-1864 and again 1878–1884); member (1872) and president (1877–1885) of the Bordeaux chamber of commerce; deputy mayor of Bordeaux (1860–1863); administrator of the Bordeaux welfare office (1852–1881); administrator of the Bordeaux savings bank (1852–1870); and Consul of Austria-Hungary (1867). Lalande became vice-president of the association for the defence of commercial freedom in 1887.

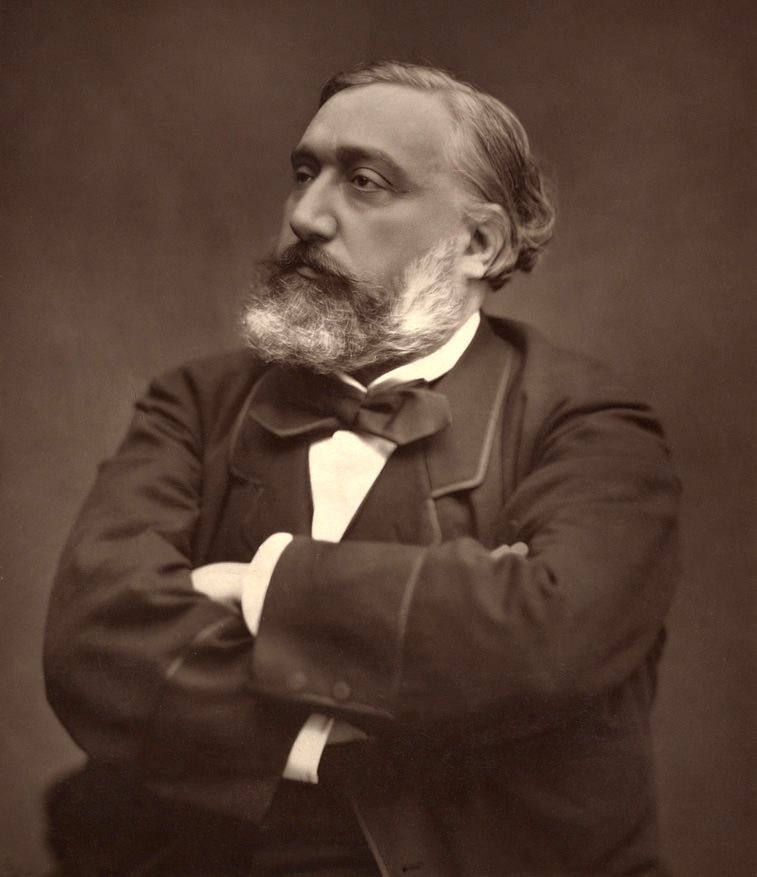
Léon Gambetta, Prime Minister of France 1881-1882 whose administration was supported by Armand Lalande, photographed by Étienne Carjat

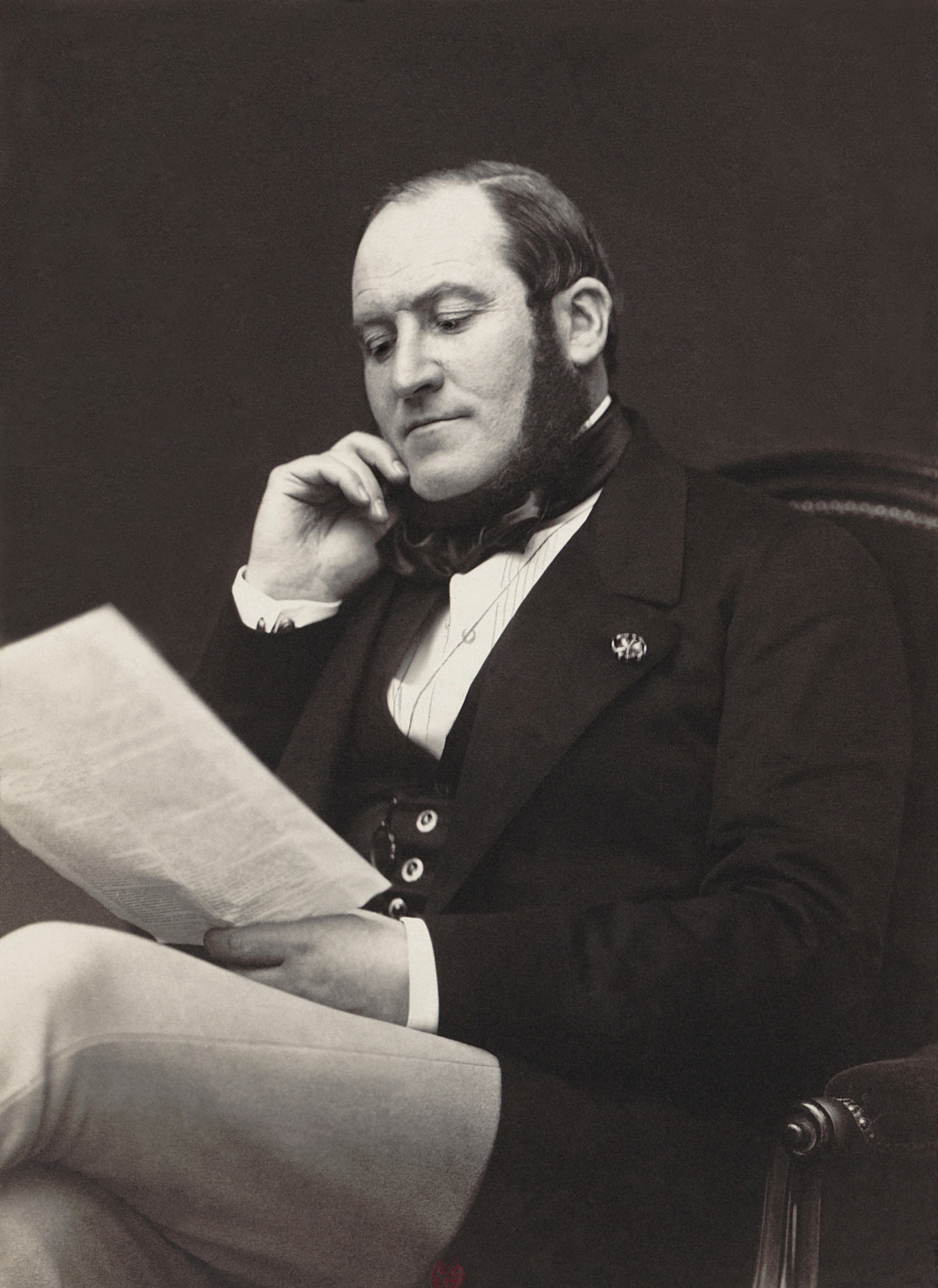
Baron Georges-Eugène Haussmann LH, Prime Minister of France 1880-1881

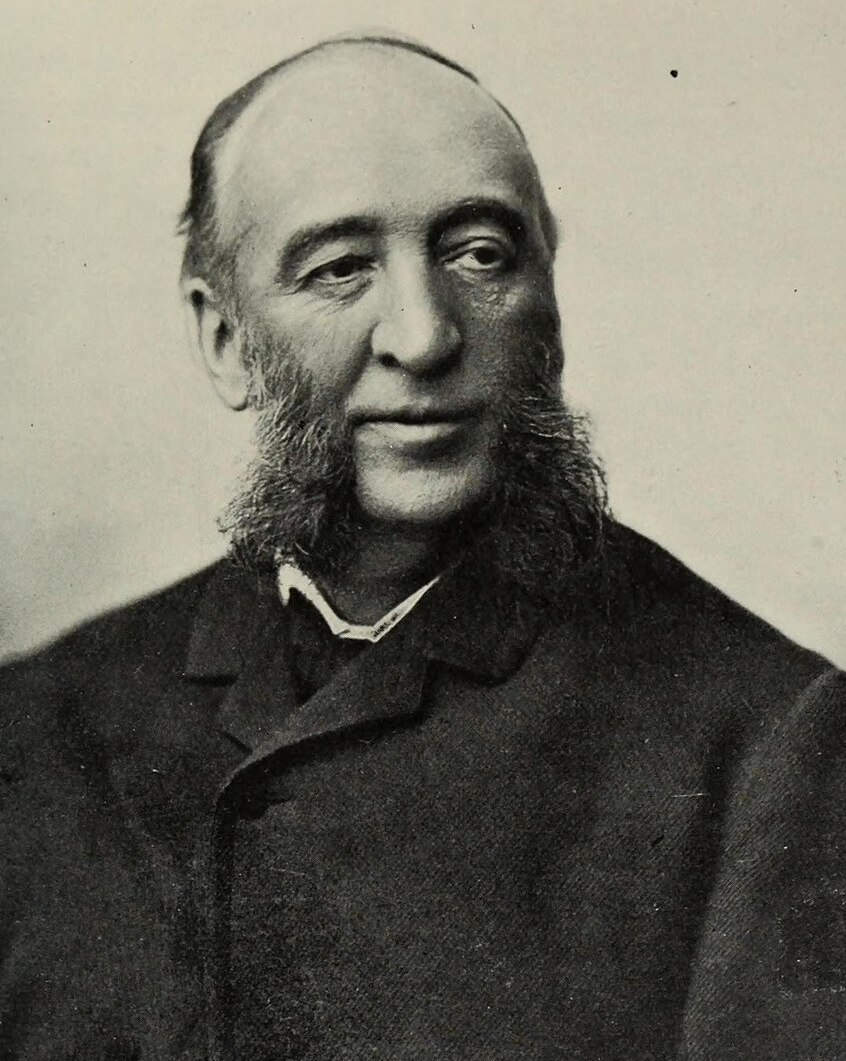
Jules Ferry, Prime Minister of France 1883-1885 whose administration was supported by Armand Lalande

Lalande stood as a Republican candidate in the 1881 French Third Republic legislative election and elected Deputy in the second round of voting (September 4) in the district of Lesparre by 5,524 votes (10,794 voters, 14,487 registered) against 5,168 votes for Ernest Pascal (1828–1888), a Bonapartist and former under-secretary of state for the interior. In the first round of voting, the conservative votes were shared between Pascal and Baron Haussmann. Mr. Lalande registered with the Republican Union, took part in economic and commercial discussions as a free trader, spoke on the recruitment law and on colonial questions, supported the Gambetta and Ferry ministries, and voted for the Tonkin credits, and against the separation of Church and State.

On 4 October 1885, Lalande was placed on the Opportunist faction list for the Gironde, collected 65,363 votes in the first round and polled second out of eleven candidates in the second round with 89,128 votes (162,286 voters, 203,661 registered) and was duly elected. Lalande was a member of the Tonkin credits commission, he spoke once again (24 December 1885) in favour of the expedition, opined against the expulsion of the princes (June 1886), supported the Rouvier and Tirard cabinets, and voted for the re-establishment of the district ballot (11 February 1889), for the indefinite postponement of the revision of the Constitution, for the prosecution of three deputies who were members of the League of Patriots, for the Lisbon bill restricting freedom of the press, and for the prosecution of General Boulanger. Lalande did not stand again for re-election in 1889.

== Owner of Officially Classified Châteaux ==
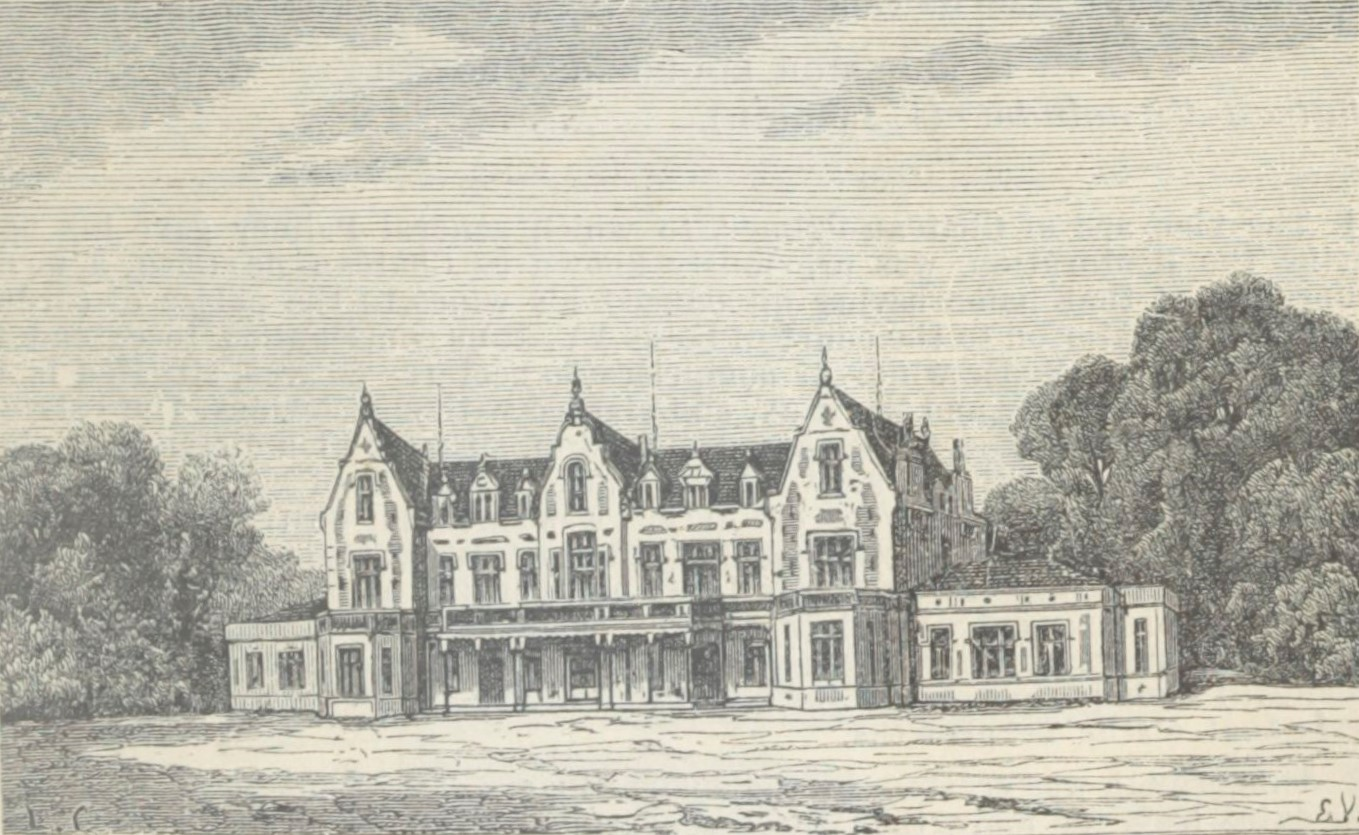
Châteaux Cantenac Brown in 1898 as built by Armand Lalande

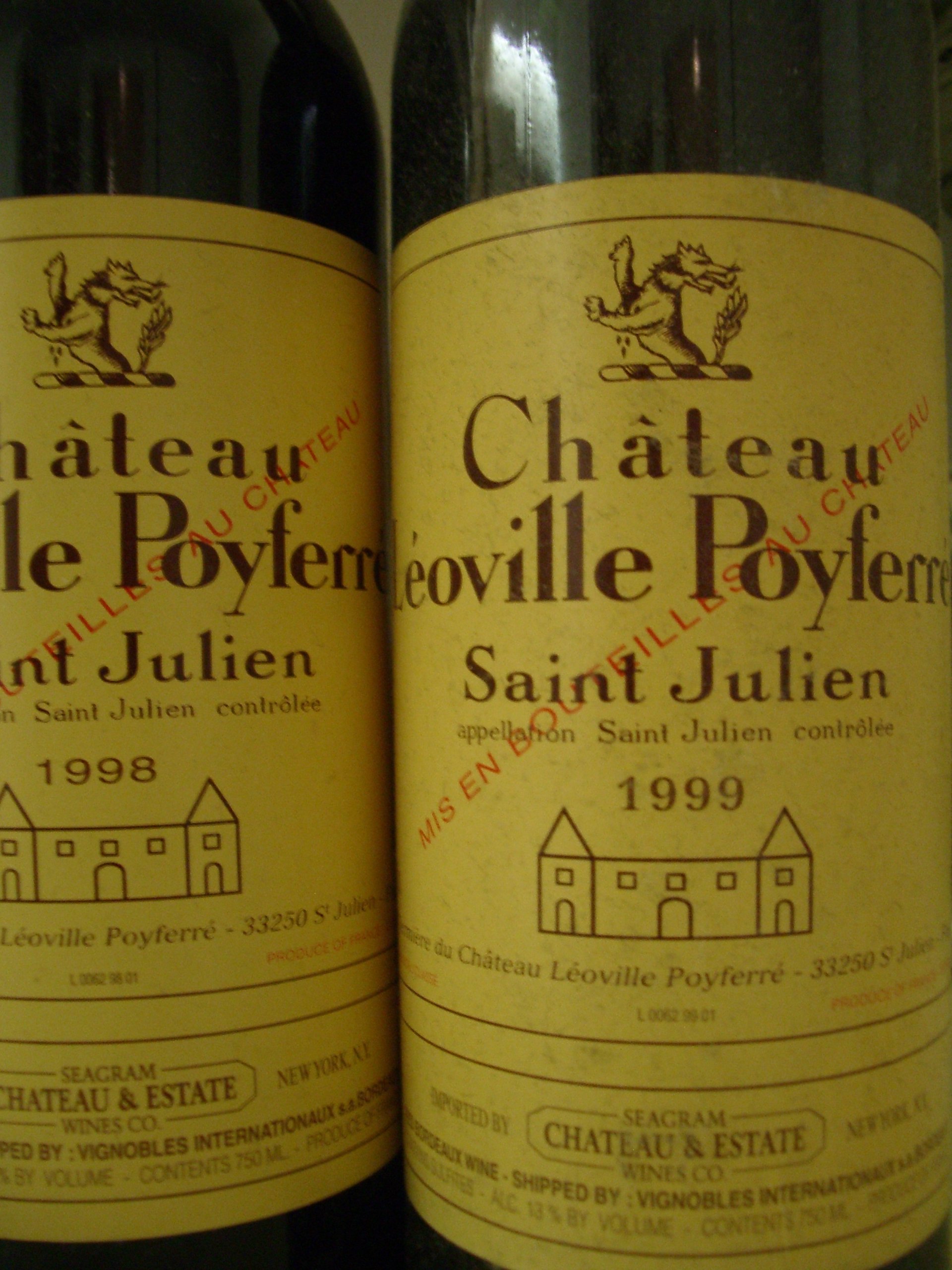
The Wine of Château Leoville Poyferre formerly owned by Armand Lalande

In addition to being one of the leading nineteenth-century wine merchants of Bordeaux, Armand Lalande founded a winemaking dynasty that lasted for over a century through the acquisition of a number of officially classified and other vineyards including Château Léoville-Poyferré (2nd growth), Château Cantenac-Brown (3rd growth) bought for one million francs in 1860 and remaining in the family until 1968, Châteaux la Couronne, Châteaux Lamartine, and Châteaux Moulin Riche (second wine of Châteaux Leoville-Poyferré). His name continues to be used for a number of commercial wines.

== Writer on Commerce and Free Trade ==
Lalande took a keen interest in commerce and corresponded widely with politicians and economists in the United States and in England, and regularly published his ideas on free trade, notably sharing a paper with John Stuart Mill in 1869 about the impact of the English duty on corn. This may have been the paper co-authored by Lalande and published as Lettre en faveur du maintien du traité de commerce aves l'Angleterre (Bordeaux, 1872). Lalande was later the author of L'Angleterre, l'agriculture anglais et the libre échange (Paris, 1885), and co-founded the newspaper l'Economiste Francais to defend the ideas of free trade.

== Other Positions ==
Lalande became president of the board of directors of the Bordeaux Steam Navigation Company in 1887, a public company working on behalf of the Bordeaux Chamber of Commerce and operating steamboats between Bordeaux and New York, and in 1883 became the administrator of the Orléans railway company.

== Honours and awards ==
- Lalande was appointed a Knight of the Légion d'honneur by Emperor Napoleon III on 14 August 1862, and made an Officer of the Légion d'honneur by Marshall de MacMahon, President of France, on 20 October 1878;
- At the Universal Exhibition of 1878 Lalande received a diploma of honour for the collection of Gironde wines sent by the Chamber of Commerce.
- The Quai Armand Lalande in Bordeaux is named for him.

== Personal life ==
Laland was the son of Jean Baptiste Michel Lalande (1790–1832), a wine merchant, and Marie Laure née Boué (1791–1860). Through marriage Lalande and his children became linked with some of the most important Bordeaux merchant houses and estate-owning families. Armand Lalande married Sophie Catherine Mathilde Cruse (1829–1851) in Bordeaux on 21 June 1848, the daughter of Hans Wilhelm Herman Cruse (1790–1855) and Anna Rebecca née Raake (1800–1876), and by her had a daughter, (Marie Mathilde Emma) Laure Lalande (1849–1940) who in 1870 married Jean-Édouard Lawton, who was involved in the initial ranking and classification selection process for the Bordeaux Wine Official Classification of 1855, and a son, Jean François Michel Armand Lalande (1851–1934) who married Camille Marie Marguerite de Lestapis and whose daughter, Alice Marie, married Baron Henry Nivière in 1905.

== Death ==
Armand Lalande died on 24 September 1894 in Bordeaux, at the age of 74. It has been said that he had nothing of the selfish and arrogant bourgeois caste spirit, and that his numerous pious and charitable legacies show that he was very close to the spirit of Marc Sangnier and Pope Leo XIII.

== See also ==
- List of mayors of Bordeaux
