= Thomas Slidell =

American judge (~1807–1864)

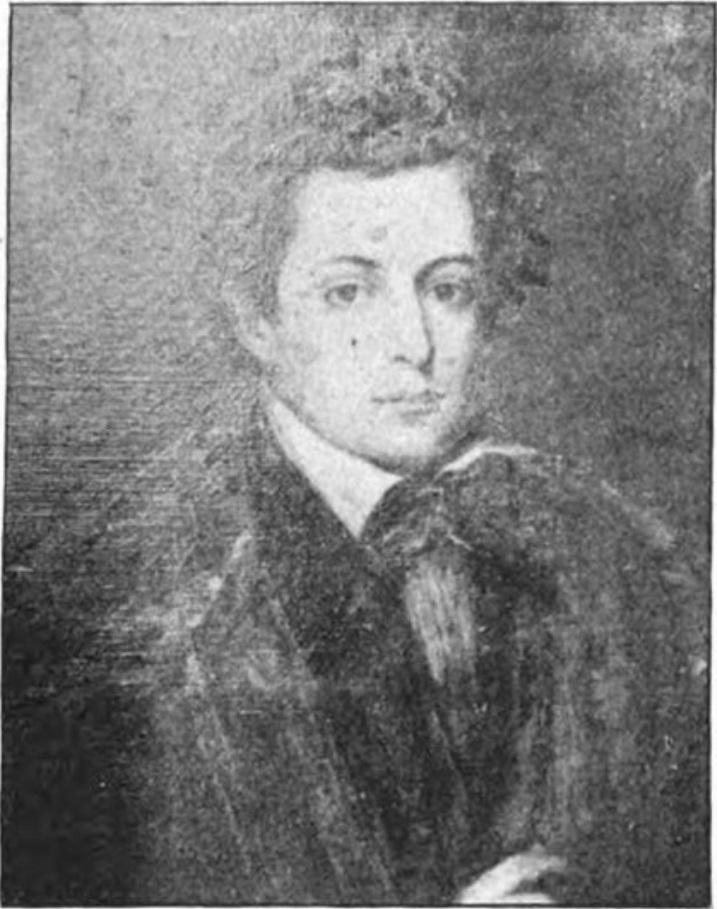

Thomas Slidell (c. 1807 – April 20, 1864) was chief justice of the Louisiana Supreme Court. He was a brother of John Slidell, a diplomat of the Confederate States of America in France.

He entered Yale College from New York and graduated in 1825. He was a student at the same time as Judah P. Benjamin. He was the United States Attorney for the Eastern District of Louisiana from 1837 to 1838; his brother John had held the post from 1829 to 1833.

Following the Creole mutiny, Slidell, Benjamin, and F. B. Conrad were hired by insurance companies to defend them against the claims of slave traders' who lost the money when the human cargo commandeered the ship and escaped to the Bahamas.

He was an associate justice of the Louisiana Supreme Court for several years subsequent to 1847, and in 1855 he was appointed Chief Justice of the State.

Having resigned his position on the bench, he went to Europe in 1856, for the purpose of recruiting his health, which had been impaired for a year or two, in consequence of his excessive professional labor. While abroad, mental disease developed itself, he was brought back to this country to become a patient of the Butler Hospital, in Providence, Rhode Island. During the winter of 1862–63, the cloud lifted, and in most respects his perceptions became quite clear and correct; and in April, 1863, he rejoined his family, who were residing in Newport, Rhode Island, and there he remained until his death, April 20, 1864, aged 57 years.

According to a history of U.S. Attorneys, "Assaulted by thieves in 1855, Thomas Slidell never fully recovered and died in 1860." A news report of 1887 claimed that while he was presenting his ballot on Election Day, he was punched in the head by a Know-Nothing-Party-affiliated "ruffian" wearing brass knuckles.

He left a widow (formerly Miss Callender), and a son who was an officer in the U.S. Army.

== See also ==
- Know-Nothing Riots in United States politics
