= Bankier =

Bankier is a surname. Notable people with the surname include:

- David Bankier (1947–2010), Israeli historian
- Ian Bankier (born 1952), Scottish businessman
- Imogen Bankier (born 1987), Scottish badminton player, daughter of Ian Bankier
- William Bankier (1870–1949), Scottish strongman and performer
