= Emile Erlanger & Co. =

French finance company

Emile Erlanger & Co. was a French finance and investment company established by German-born, Parisian banker Baron Frédéric Émile d'Erlanger and was active during and after the period of Reconstruction following the American Civil War. d'Erlanger was married to Matilde Slidell, the daughter of Louisiana merchant, lawyer and politician John Slidell.

The company was known for its cotton bonds issued to support the Confederacy in 1863. The total came to £3 million pounds (about $14.5 million US dollars), but relations soured and no more major loans were raised.

After 1865 the bank had a specialty in channeling French capital into Southern railroads and land development, notably the railroads of the Queen and Crescent Route.

The bank was renamed Erlanger Ltd. from 1928.

In 1958, the bank merged with Philip Hill Higginson under the chairmanship of Leo d'Erlanger. The name of the bank was then changed to Philip Hill Higginson Erlanger Ltd. In 1965, the bank merged with private bank M Samuel to become Hill Samuel & Co, which was subsequently taken over by TSB Group Plc. in 1987, which itself merged with Lloyds Bank to become Lloyds TSB in 1995.

== See also ==
- S. Isaac, Campbell & Company, major British supplier for the Confederacy who accepted Erlanger cotton bonds as payment.
- John Slidell
- Erlanger, Kentucky
- Slidell, Louisiana
