= Carlo von Erlanger =

German ornithologist and explorer (1872–1904)

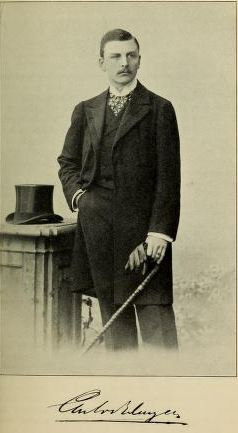
- Born: 5 September 1872; Ingelheim am Rhein, Grand Duchy of Hesse, German Empire
- Died: 4 September 1904 (aged 31); Salzburg, Austria
- Other names: Carl Viktor Heinrich Freiherr von Erlanger
- Occupation(s): Ornithologist, explorer

Carlo von Erlanger (5 September 1872 – 4 September 1904) was a German ornithologist and explorer born in Ingelheim am Rhein. He was a cousin to musicologist Rodolphe d'Erlanger, and a member of the Erlanger family.

He studied ornithology at the University of Lausanne, and performed wildlife studies in the Tunisian desert from 1893 to 1897. On his return to Europe he continued his studies at Cambridge and Berlin. In 1900 and 1901, with Oscar Rudolph Neumann, he went to East Africa (what is now Ethiopia and Somalia) and investigated and collected many thousands of insect and avian specimens. Erlanger died in an automobile accident in Salzburg on 4 September 1904, one day shy of his 32nd birthday.

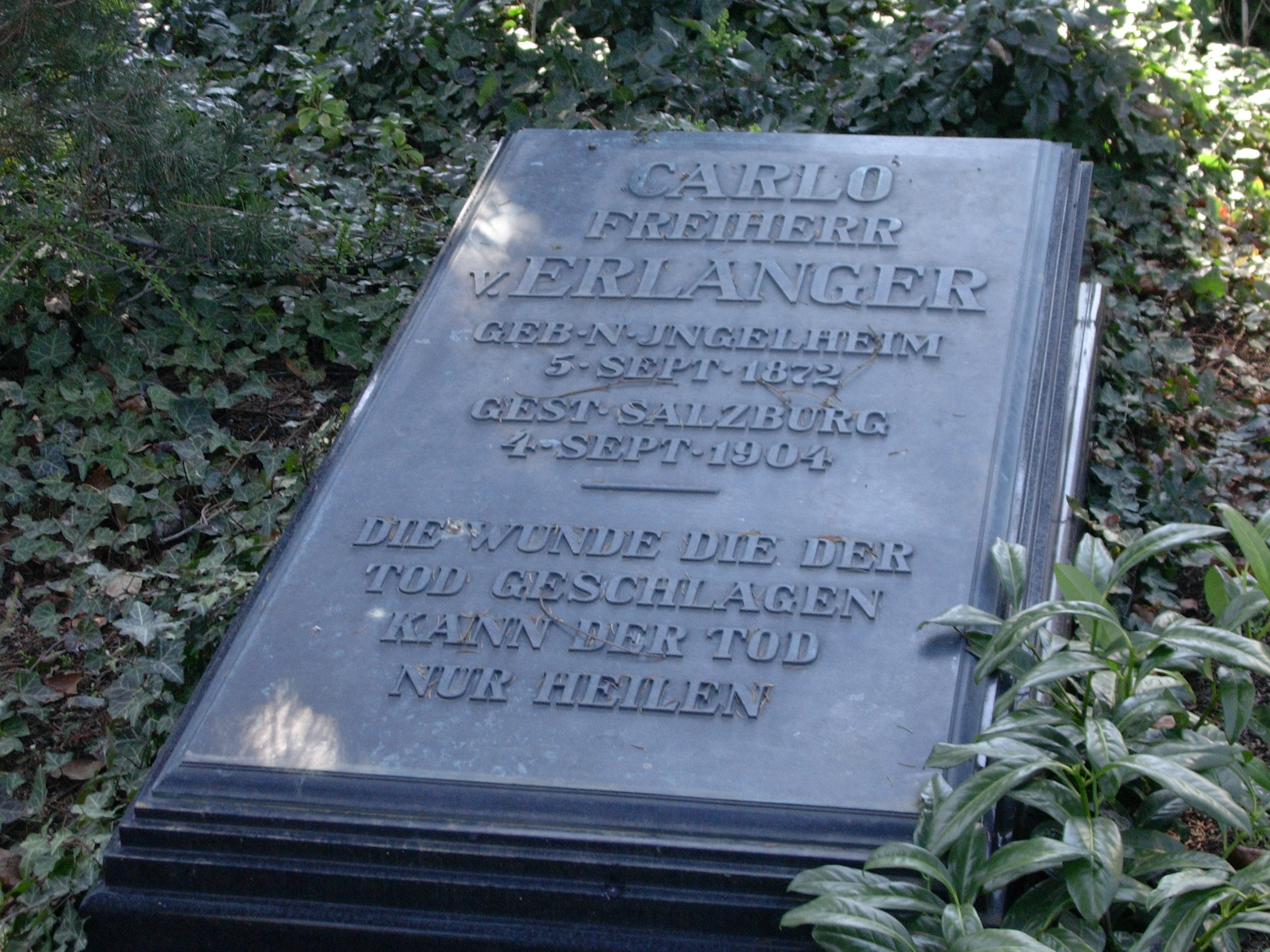
Grave marker of Carlo von Erlanger, Nieder-Ingelheim Cemetery

Erlanger is credited with naming 17 new ornithological taxa, and has several zoological species named after him, such as:

- Erlanger's lark, Calandrella erlangeri (Neumann 1906)
- Ptychadena erlangeri (Ahl, 1924), an Ethiopian frog
- Bofa erlangeri (Sternfeld, 1908), an Ethiopian snake
- Erlanger’s gazelle, Gazella erlangeri (Neumann, 1906)

His name is also associated with the subspecies Madoqua saltiana erlangeri Neumann, 1905.

== Written works ==
- Eine ornithologische Forschungsreise durch Tunesien (1898)
- Meine Reise durch Sud-Schoa, Galla und die Somal-Lander (1902)
- Forschungsreise durch Sud-Schoa, Galla und die Somali-lander. Beitrage zur Vogelfauna Nordostafrikas, mit besonderer Berucksichtigung der Zoogeographie (1904)
