= John Slidell =

19th-century American businessman and diplomat

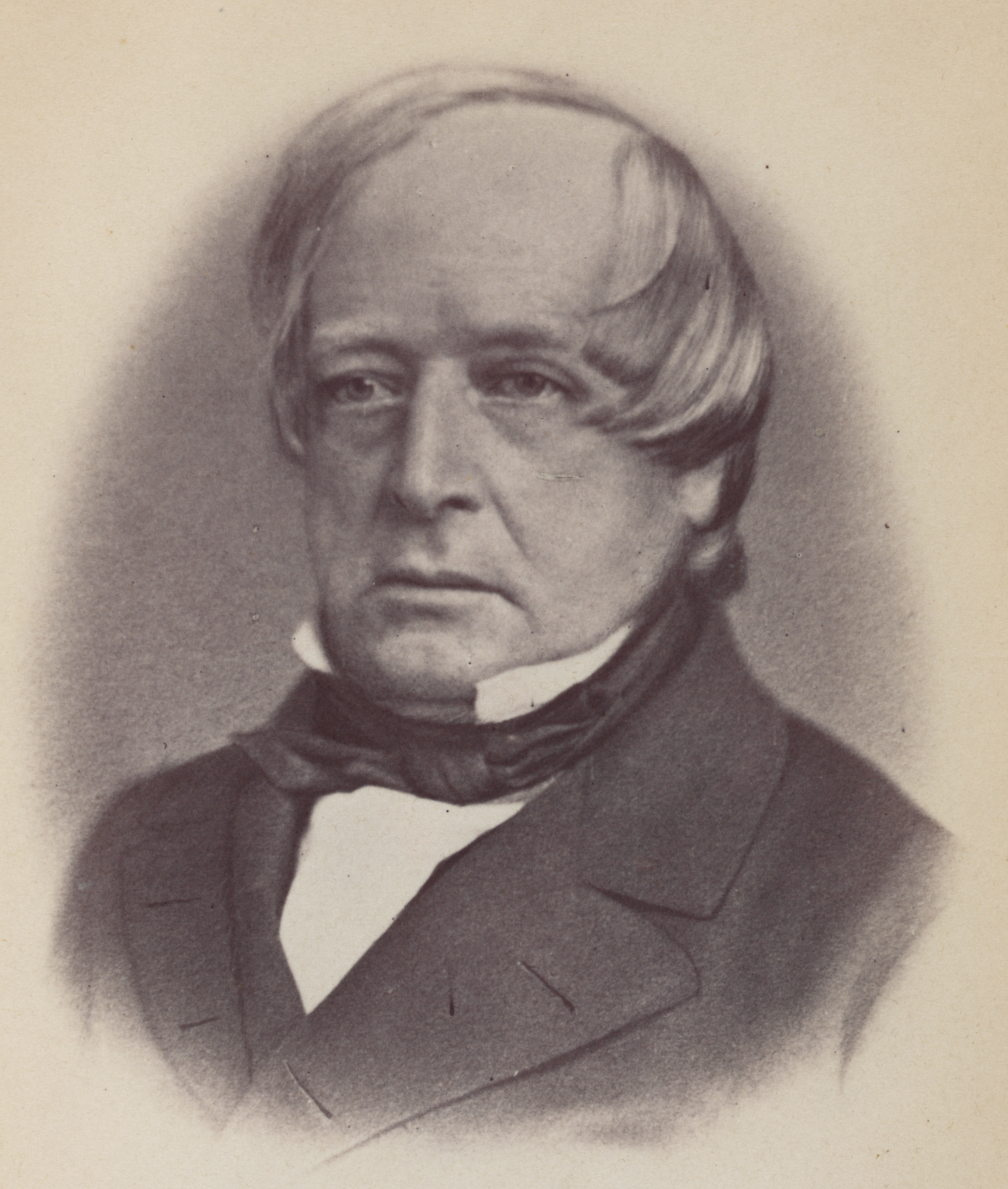

United States Minister to Mexico
- In office 1845–1846
- President: James K. Polk
- Preceded by: Wilson Shannon
- Succeeded by: David Conner
- In office December 5, 1853 – February 4, 1861
- Preceded by: Pierre Soulé
- Succeeded by: William P. Kellogg

Member of the U.S. House of Representatives from Louisiana's 1st district
- In office March 4, 1843 – November 10, 1845
- Preceded by: Edward Douglass White, Sr.
- Succeeded by: Emile La Sére

Member of the Louisiana House of Representatives

Personal details
- Born: 1793 New York City, U.S.
- Died: July 9, 1871 (aged 77–78) Cowes, Isle of Wight, England
- Party: Democratic
- Spouse: Mathilde Deslonde Slidell
- Children: Alfred; Marie; Matilda
- Education: Columbia College
- Profession: Politician, Lawyer, Merchant

John Slidell (1793 – July 9, 1871) was an American politician, lawyer, slaveholder, and businessman. A native of New York, Slidell moved to Louisiana as a young man. He was a member of the Louisiana House of Representatives, U.S. House of Representatives and the U.S. Senate. He was one of two Confederate diplomats captured by the United States Navy from the British ship RMS Trent in 1861 and later released. He was the older brother of Alexander Slidell Mackenzie, a U.S. naval officer.

== Early life ==
He was born to merchant John Slidell and Margery née Mackenzie, a Scot. He graduated from Columbia University (then Columbia College) in 1810. In 1835, Slidell married Mathilde Deslonde. They had three children: Alfred Slidell, Marie Rosine (later [on 30 Sept. 1872] comtesse [Countess] de St. Roman), and Marguerite Mathilde (later [on 3 Oct. 1864] baronne [Baroness] Frederic Emile d'Erlanger).

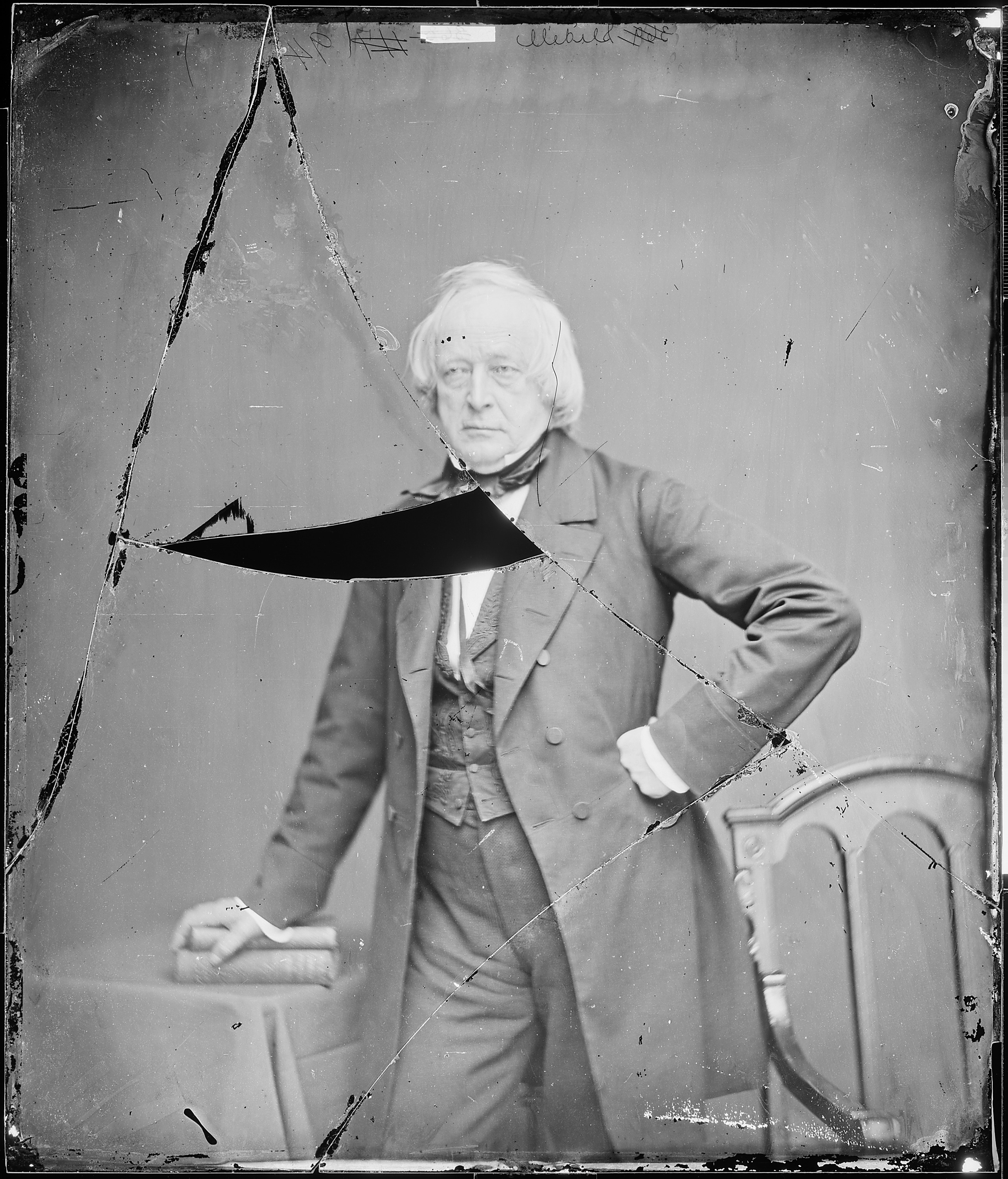
John Slidell, photograph by Mathew Brady

== Political career ==
He was the United States Attorney for the Eastern District of Louisiana from 1829 to 1833; his brother Thomas Slidell held the post from 1837 to 1838.

Prior to the Mexican-American War, Slidell was sent to Mexico by President James K. Polk to negotiate an agreement whereby the Rio Grande would be the southern border of Texas. He also was instructed to offer, among other alternatives, a maximum of $25 million for California by Polk and his administration. Slidell warned Polk that the Mexican reluctance to negotiate a peaceful solution might require a show of military force by the United States to defend the border. Under the command of General Zachary Taylor, U.S. troops were sent into the disputed area between the Rio Grande and Nueces Rivers. The Mexican government, in a state of chaos at the time, rejected Slidell's mission. After Mexican forces repelled a U.S. scouting expedition, the United States declared war on Mexico on May 13, 1846.

Slidell developed a close friendship with James Buchanan when Buchanan was Secretary of State.

Slidell was elected to the Senate in 1853 and cast his lot with other pro-Southern congressmen to repeal the Missouri Compromise, acquire Cuba, and admit Kansas as a slave state. In the 1860 campaign, Slidell supported Democratic presidential candidate John C. Breckinridge but remained a pro-Union moderate until Abraham Lincoln's election resulted in the Southern states seceding. At the Democratic National Convention in Charleston, South Carolina, in April 1860, Slidell plotted with Fire-Eaters, such as William Lowndes Yancey of Alabama, to stymie the nomination of the popular Northern Democratic Senator Stephen A. Douglas of Illinois.

== Civil War ==
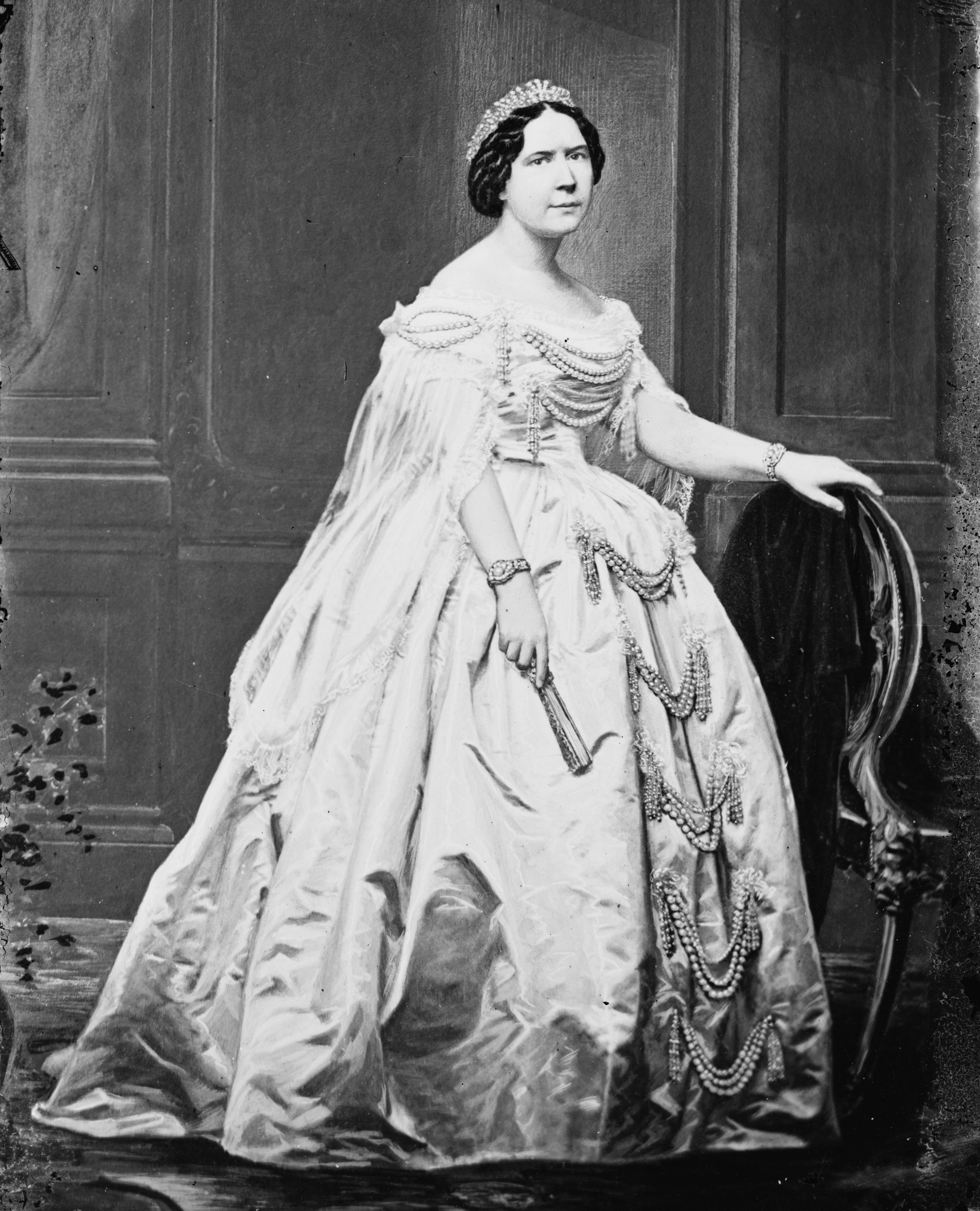
Mathilde Deslonde Slidell

In September 1861, Slidell and James Murray Mason of Virginia were appointed Confederate commissioners to France. They ran the blockade from Charleston, South Carolina, and then set sail from Havana on the British mail boat steamer RMS Trent but were intercepted by the US Navy while en route and taken into captivity at Fort Warren in Boston. The northern public erupted in a huge display of triumphalism at this dramatic capture. Even the cool-headed Lincoln was swept along in the celebratory spirit, but when he and his cabinet considered the likelihood of a war with Britain, their enthusiasm waned. After some careful diplomatic exchanges, they admitted that the capture had been conducted contrary to maritime law and that private citizens could not be classified as "enemy despatches." Slidell and Mason were released, and war was averted.

After the resolution of the Trent Affair, the two diplomats set sail for England on January 1, 1862. From England, Slidell at once went to Paris, where, in February 1862, he paid his first visit to the French minister of foreign affairs. His mission to gain recognition of the Confederate States by France failed, as did his effort to negotiate a commercial agreement for France to get control of Southern cotton if the blockade were broken. In both cases, France refused to move without the co-operation of England. He succeeded in negotiating a loan of $15,000,000 from his father-in-law's bank (Emile Erlanger & Co.) and in securing the ship Stonewall for the Confederate government.

== Later life ==
Slidell moved to Paris, France, after the Civil War. He died in Cowes, Isle of Wight, England, at age 78. Along with Judah P. Benjamin and Ambrose Dudley Mann, Slidell was among the high-ranking Confederate officials buried abroad.

== Family ==
John Slidell was the brother of Alexander Slidell Mackenzie, a naval officer who commanded the USS Somers, on which a unique event occurred in 1842 off the coast of Africa during the Blockade of Africa. Three crewmen were hanged after being convicted of mutiny at sea. Mackenzie reversed the order of his middle and last names to honor a maternal uncle.

Slidell was also the brother-in-law of the American naval Commodore Matthew C. Perry, who was married to Slidell's sister, Jane. Another brother, Thomas Slidell, was chief justice of the Louisiana Supreme Court.

== Legacy ==
The city of Slidell in St. Tammany Parish, Louisiana, was named in his honor by his son-in-law, Baron Frederic Emile d'Erlanger; the village of Slidell, Texas, is also named after him.

== Sources ==
- Case, Lynn M., and Warren E. Spencer. The United States and France: Civil War Diplomacy (1970) online
- Sears, Louis Martin. "A Confederate Diplomat at the Court of Napoleon III," American Historical Review (1921) 26#2 pp. 255–281 in JSTOR on Slidell
- Sears, Louis Martin. John Slidell, Duke University Press (1925).
- Sainlaude, Stève. France and the American Civil War: A Diplomatic History (UNC Press, 2019).

U.S. House of Representatives
Preceded by Edward D. White, Sr.	Member of the U.S. House of Representatives from Louisiana's 1st congressional district March 4, 1843 – November 10, 1845	Succeeded by Emile La Sére
U.S. Senate
Preceded by Pierre Soulé	U.S. senator (Class 3) from Louisiana; December 5, 1853 – February 4, 1861; Served alongside: Judah P. Benjamin	Succeeded by William P. Kellogg^{(1)}
Notes and references
1. Because of Louisiana's secession, the Senate seat was vacant for seven years before Kellogg succeeded Slidell.
