= Gerard d'Erlanger =

French-British accountant and aviation enthusiast (1906–1962)

Baron Sir Gerard John Regis Leo d'Erlanger, CBE (1906–1962) was a merchant banker in London (partner of Erlanger Ltd. and Myers & Co) and aviation enthusiast.

Baron d'Erlanger was the second son of Emile Beaumont Baron d’Erlanger (1866–1939), banker and musician, and his wife Catherine, Baroness d'Erlanger, née Catherine Robert d'Aqueria de Rochegude. (See: Erlanger family tree). His daughter, Mary Caroline d'Erlanger, married Winston Churchill, the grandson of Prime Minister Sir Winston Churchill.

He helped form British Airways and became the chairman of the British Overseas Airways Corporation (BOAC). At the outset of the Second World War, he successfully lobbied for creation of the Air Transport Auxiliary (ATA) which he then commanded. In the 1943 New Year Honours, he was made a Commander of the Order of the British Empire for his services to the ATA. In 1928, he married composer Edythe Baker. They divorced in 1934.
