= Frédéric Émile d'Erlanger =

German banker (1832–1911)

Baron Frédéric Émile d'Erlanger
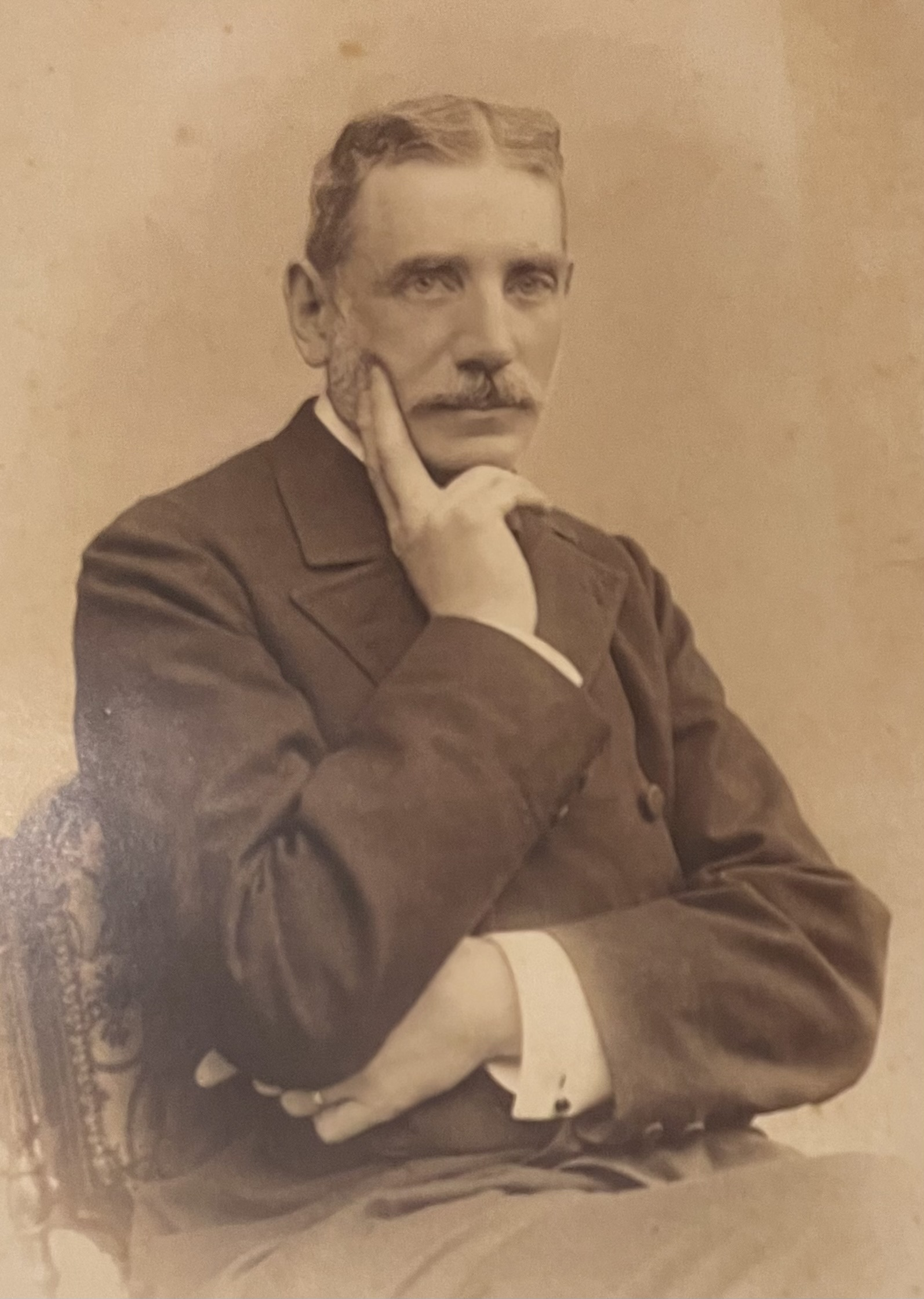
- Born: 19 June 1832; Frankfurt am Main, Germany
- Died: 22 May 1911 (aged 78); Versailles, France
- Spouse: Marguerite Mathilde Slidell
- Children: Baron Raphael Slidell d'Erlanger, Baron Emile Beaumont d'Erlanger, Baron Frédéric Alfred d'Erlanger, Baron Rodolphe d'Erlanger
- Father: Raphael von Erlanger

Frédéric Émile, Baron d'Erlanger (19 June 1832 – 22 May 1911) born as Friedrich Emil Erlanger, was a German-French banker and consul. He founded the French branch of the Erlanger banking businesses, Emile Erlanger & Co.

== Biography ==
Frédéric Émile, Baron d'Erlanger was born to banker Baron Raphael von Erlanger and his young wife, Margarete Helene Albert (1800–1834). Raphael was the son of a Frankfurt currency broker, Löb Moses, later named Ludwig Moritz Erlanger (1780–1857). Raphael Erlanger had begun as a disponent in the Frankfurt business of the Rothschild family. In 1848, he founded his own bank, named Erlanger & Söhne (Erlanger & Sons) in 1865, and became a major competitor to the Rothschild banks in Frankfurt, Vienna and Paris. In 1859, Raphael Erlanger was made a Portuguese Baron by Pedro V of Portugal, he also was ennobled as von Erlanger by the Duke of Saxe-Meiningen in 1860, and elevated to the rank of a baron, together with his whole family, by Emperor Franz Joseph I of Austria in 1871.

Just prior the birth of his oldest child Susanne Adolphine (1829–1873), Raphael Erlanger converted from Judaism to Christianity for his wife's sake. Susanne eventually married the Frankfurt merchant Franz Josef Carl Langenberger (1821–1878) who became a partner in the bank.

As the eldest son, Friedrich Emil Erlanger became involved in extensive banking and bill transactions early in life. By age 19, he was so successful with his father in the brokerage business that he was appointed Consul General and fiscal agent at Paris by the Greek Government under Otto I. He visited the royal court in Stockholm and was involved in successful Swedish and Portuguese state financial negotiations. Ferdinand II of Saxe-Coburg and Gotha, as a ruler for his son King Pedro of Portugal, ennobled his father Raphael as a hereditary Portuguese Baron in order to thank Friedrich Emil, who would eventually inherit the title, for his services. Raphael was subsequently granted titles by the Duke of Saxe-Meiningen and the Austrian Empire, who named him a hereditary baron and awarded him the Grand Cross of the Order of Franz Joseph. In 1853, Frederick Emil fell ill and withdrew from business activities. In order to restore his health, he began to conduct travelers to Greece and Egypt. Here he met the Suez Canal planner Lesseps and became fascinated by the idea of the Canal. After his recovery, he became a partner of his father's Frankfurt bank, Erlanger & Sons.

=== First marriage ===
On 30 June 1858, Friedrich Emil Erlanger married a young Parisian socialite, Florence Louise Odette Lafitte (1840–1931). Her grandfather, Jacques Laffitte, was a banker, governor of the Bank of France, Finance Minister, and Prime Minister of France temporarily. In 1859, d'Erlanger officially took over the business of the banking house in Paris. He changed his name and was afterwards called Frédéric Émile Baron d'Erlanger. His marriage failed, however. The couple had no children and they divorced in December 1862.

=== Second marriage ===
On 3 October 1864, Baron d'Erlanger married the American Marguerite Mathilde Slidell (1842–1927), the daughter of the influential American lawyer, businessman and politician John Slidell (1793–1871). Slidell was the Ambassador of the Confederate States of America at the court of Emperor Napoleon III. His wife, Maria Mathilde Deslonde, was from an influential Creole family whose ancestors emigrated from Brest, France, in the seventeenth century. D'Erlanger met his second wife in New Orleans during a trip to America. She grew up on the prosperous plantation Belle Pointe in Laplace, Louisiana, 25 miles (40 km) west of New Orleans. Later, she moved with her family to Paris, where she and her sister received great attention because of their extraordinary beauty. Her sister Marie Rosine married the Comte de Saint-Roman. D'Erlanger and his wife built a villa situated in the affluent 16th arrondissement of Paris that still exists today. The access roads to the villa, "Villa Erlanger" and "Rue Erlanger", are named in his honor. In 1870, shortly before the outbreak of the Franco-Prussian War, the family moved to London. The headquarters of the banking house moved there from Paris as well. D'Erlanger resided at 139 Piccadilly in London, the former home of Lord Byron. The German-born baron and all his family members became British citizens. He was authorized to use his foreign titles of nobility, despite some strong opposition at first.

The couple had four children. Raphael Slidell d'Erlanger (1865–1897) was a zoologist and professor at Heidelberg. Baron Emile Beaumont d'Erlanger (1866–1939) later successfully took over the bank's management. Baron Frédéric Alfred d'Erlanger (1868–1943) became a banker, but later acquired acclaim as a composer. François Rodolphe d'Erlanger (1872–1932) was a musicologist and painter whose palace, Ennejma Ezzahra in Sidi Bou Said, Tunisia, now houses the Centre des Musiques Arabes et Méditerranéennes. The latter's son Leo Frédéric Alfred Baron d'Erlanger (1898–1978) eventually became the head of the family-owned bank.

=== Career ===
Baron d'Erlanger was one of the leading bankers of Paris, the dominant financial center of continental Europe in the second half of the 19th Century. He invented high-risk bonds, especially for developing countries. Towards the end of the 1850s, Erlanger was able to terminate a banking crisis in Sweden with his bonds; since he became banker of Scandinavian governments. In 1862 Erlanger & Sons issued the first Egyptian government bond, together with the Frankfurt bank Sulzbach brothers, namely Siegmund Sulzbach de (1813–1876) and Rudolf Sulzbach de (1827–1904), with whom he also worked together on railroad bonds. He invested in railroads and mines in Africa, North America, South America, and Europe, as well as Russian and Tunisian government bonds and Southern cotton during the American Civil War. Other than most German and European banks he bet on the southern states during the American Civil War. In the late 1870s Erlanger invested in the British enterprise Alabama Great Southern Railway Company Limited which funded the takeover of Alabama Great Southern Railway and Cincinnati, New Orleans and Texas Pacific Railway (CNO&TP). This railroad net, also known as the "Erlanger System", consisted of over 1,100 miles. He also financed the Swiss Simplon Tunnels between the Valais and Aosta Valley, then the largest railway tunnel in Europe. In 1884 Erlanger accompanied the IPO of the Imperial Royal Austrian State Railways. In 1870 he saved the House of Thurn und Taxis after the crash of Belgian speculator André Langrand-Dumonceau.

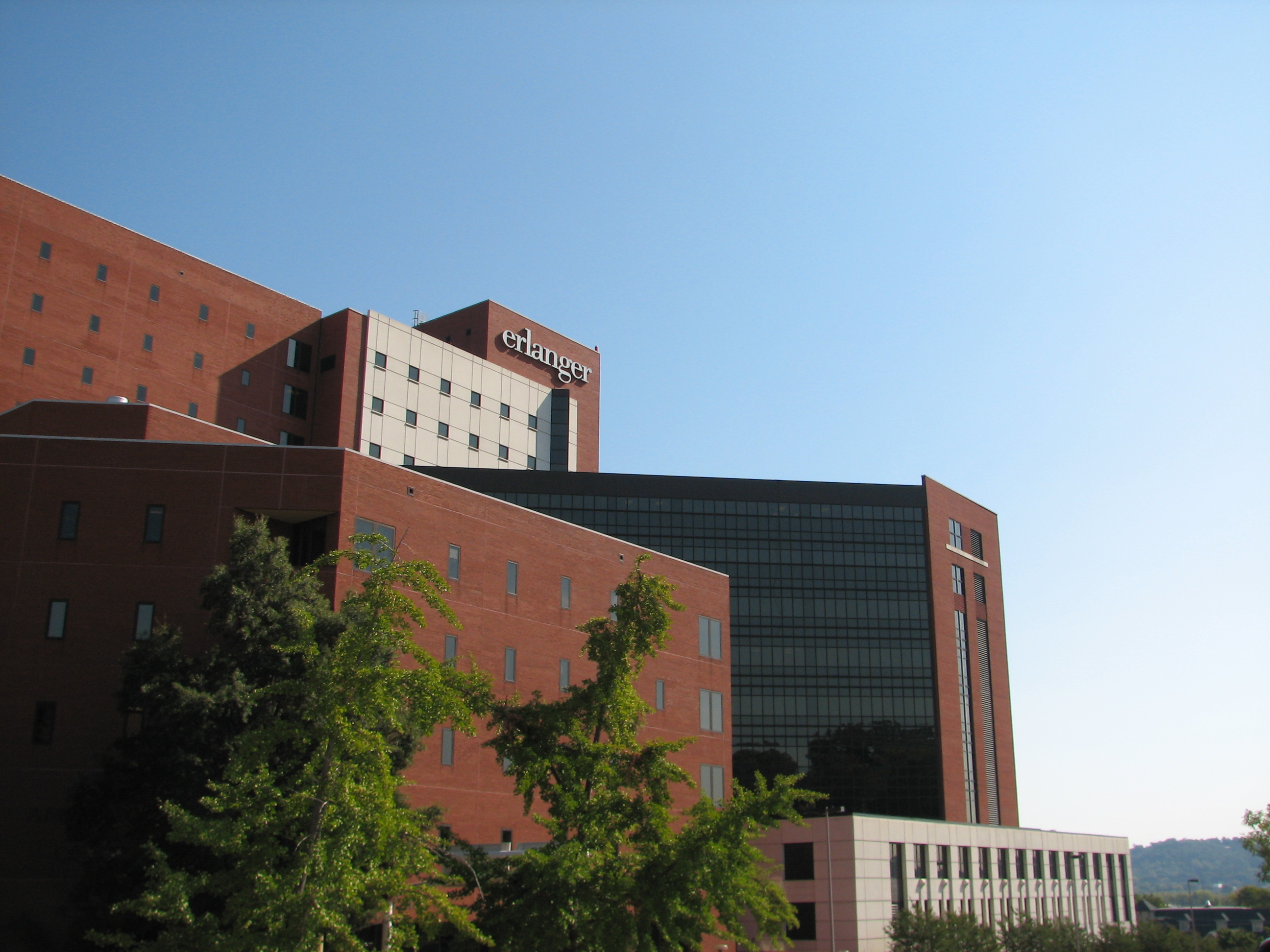
The Erlanger Health System in Chattanooga, Tennessee

Along with Paul Julius Reuter (1816–1899), the founder of Reuters news agency, his bank, Erlanger Ltd., funded the construction of a French transatlantic telegraph cable in 1869. His wife, Mathilde, Baroness d'Erlanger, sent the historic first message. In 1889, during an inspection tour of their American railroad investments, the couple created the d'Erlanger Grant for start-up capital to build a hospital in Chattanooga, Tennessee. It is known today as the Erlanger Health System. Erlanger, Kentucky was named to honor the d'Erlangers' financial contributions.

In 1904 however, the Erlangers sold their Frankfurt branch to Dresdner Bank and concentrated on their French and British branches. The main reason may have been the earlier deaths of Ludwig Gottlieb Friedrich von Erlanger (1836–1898), Viktor Alexander von Erlanger (1840–1896) and Carlo von Erlanger (1872–1904). Yet competition by big trading banks may have contributed, just as relocation of banks to Berlin and stricter stock exchange legislation.

=== Culture ===
As music lovers and influential members of the haute bourgeoisie who had personal relationships with the leaders of many countries, they promoted Richard Wagner and his music, including the first performance of Tannhäuser at the Paris Opera after the Franco-Prussian War. D'Erlanger also donated several art works, including the seventeenth-century allegorical tapestries depicting the Duke of Alba to the Hampton Court Palace of the British crown.

The d'Erlangers also funded the rescue of Goya's Black Paintings - murals from the Quinta del Sordo in 1873. This house, which they bought, was temporarily residence of Francisco de Goya. Goya's Pinturas Negras were costly to save from destruction. These "black paintings" that Goya painted directly on plaster, were gently transferred to canvas. After their lack of public acceptance at the Paris Exposition of 1878, these works were given to the Prado in Madrid two years later.

In 1866, Baron d'Erlanger and M. Armand Lalande purchased Château Léoville-Poyferré in Bordeaux for one million Francs and ran it successfully until the 1890s.

In Italy, the d'Erlangers leased Villa Foscari, the famous mansion built in the seventeenth century by Andrea Palladio, and commissioned restoration work.

Frédéric Emile, Baron d'Erlanger died in Versailles on 22 May 1911. His second son, Baron Emile Beaumont d'Erlanger, had previously succeeded him in the management of the bank.

== Erlanger family tree ==
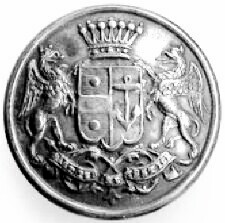
Coat of arms of the barons d'Erlanger

- Löb Moses, later Ludwig Moritz Erlanger (1780–1857), currency broker in Frankfurt am Main
  - Raphael Erlanger (1806–1878), created in 1859 Barão d'Erlanger by Pedro V of Portugal and in 1871 Freiherr von Erlanger by Franz Joseph I of Austria. He was a banker and politician in Frankfurt, founder of the bank Erlanger & Sons
    - Susanne Adolphine von Erlanger (1829–1843) ⚭ Franz Josef Carl Langenberger, partner in the bank
    - Frédéric Emile Baron d'Erlanger (1832–1911), banker in Frankfurt, Vienna and Paris, founder of „Emile Erlanger & Cie" ⚭ I) Florence Louise Odette Lafitte, II) Marguerite Mathilde Slidell (1842–1927), daughter of John Slidell
      - Raphael Slidell Baron d'Erlanger (1865–1897), zoologist
      - Emile Beaumont Baron d'Erlanger (1866–1939), banker, musician ⚭ Catherine de Robert d'Aqueria de Rochegude
        - Robert (called Robin) Emile Frédéric Regis Baron d'Erlanger (1896–1934), partner of Erlanger Ltd. ⚭ Myrle Farquharson of Invercauld
          - Zoe Caroline Georgia Baroness d'Erlanger (b. 1930) ⚭ Paul Cater Hyde-Thompson
        - Liliane Mary Mathilde (Baba) Baroness d'Erlanger (1901–1945) ⚭ Prince Jean-Louis de Faucigny-Lucinge
        - Gérard John Leo Regis Baron d'Erlanger (1905–1962), partner of Erlanger Ltd. and Myers & Co. ⚭ Gladys Sammut
          - Robin Gérard Baron d'Erlanger ⚭ 1969 Mary Elizabeth Josephine Pellew (b. 1947), daughter of Pownoll Irving Edward Pellew, 9th Viscount Exmouth
          - Penny Baroness d'Erlanger
          - Mary Caroline „Minnie" Baroness d'Erlanger ⚭ Winston Churchill (1940–2010), grandson of Sir Winston Churchill
        - Bianca Baroness d'Erlanger
      - Frédéric Alfred Baron d'Erlanger (Freddy, 1868–1943), banker and composer
      - Rodolphe François Baron d'Erlanger (1872–1932), French painter, orientalist and musicologist specializing in Arabic music, built Ennejma Ezzahra Palace near Tunis ⚭ Maria Elisabetta Contessa Barbiellini-Amidei
        - Leo Frédéric Alfred Baron d'Erlanger (1898–1978), banker in London (Erlanger Ltd.), sold the bank in 1958 to Hill, Samuel & Co, then Philip Hill Higginson Erlanger Ltd. ⚭ Edwina Prue
          - Tess Edwina May Baroness d'Erlanger (1934–2008)
          - Rodolphe Frédéric Baron d'Erlanger (1945–2000) ⚭ II) 1982 Lady Caroline Mary Cholmondeley, daughter of George Hugh Cholmondeley, 6th Marquess of Cholmondeley
            - Leo Frédéric Hugh d'Erlanger (b. 1983)
            - Joshua Robert David d'Erlanger (b. 1987)
    - Wilhelm Hermann Carl von Erlanger (1835–1909), from 1872 baron, justiciar with Erlanger & Sons, Frankfurt ⚭ Caroline von Bernus, daughter of senator Franz von Bernus
      - Franz Emil Alexander Baron von Erlanger († 1918) ⚭ Christina Grottero
      - Carlo Baron von Erlanger (1872–1904), ornithologist and explorer in Africa
    - Ludwig Gottlieb Friedrich Baron von Erlanger (1836–1898), partner of Erlanger & Sons in Vienna and Frankfurt, sold the bank to Dresdner Bank in 1904 ⚭ Mathilde Gabriele Alexander (opera singer as Mathilde Sessi)
      - Espérance Baroness von Erlanger, ⚭ Prince Alexander of Solms-Braunfels, pioneer of balloon flights, 1905 Austrian member of the International Olympic Committee
      - Blanche Baroness von Erlanger
      - Margarethe Baroness von Erlanger
    - Viktor Alexander Baron von Erlanger (1840–1894), banker in Vienna and London, partner of Erlanger & Sons (sold in 1904) ⚭ Henriette von Bognar
      - Ludwig Baron von Erlanger (b. 1862)
      - Adolfine Baroness von Erlanger (b. 1863) ⚭ Count Alfred of Salm-Hoogstraeten
      - Ida Helene Baroness von Erlanger (b. 1865) ⚭ Count Otto of Salm-Hoogstraeten
      - Victor Raphael Matheo Baron von Erlanger (b. 1867)
  - Marx Erlanger, later Christian Wilhelm Maximilian Erlanger, Music director in Frankfurt

== See also ==
- Emile Erlanger and Company
- Erlanger Health System
