= Hill Samuel =

Investment bank

- Type: Public
- Industry: Banking
- Founded: 1832
- Defunct: 1995
- Fate: Acquired
- Successor: Lloyds Banking Group
- Headquarters: London, UK

Hill Samuel is a wholly owned subsidiary of Lloyds Banking Group's Offshore Private Banking unit. It was formerly a leading British merchant bank and financial services firm before the takeover by TSB Group Plc in 1987, which itself merged with Lloyds Bank to become Lloyds TSB in 1995.

== History ==
In 1832, Marcus Samuel founded the company M. Samuel & Co. near the Tower of London to import goods from the Far East. It started with seashells, later extending its trading business to rice and general produce. By the middle of the 19th century, the company expanded further into the re-exporting business, importing goods worldwide and re-exporting them to Europe and North America.

Recognising the opportunities offered by the emerging rise of the oil industry, in the 1880s Marcus shipped case oil from Russian oil fields to Japan such that by 1888 that he was able to commission his own ships for bulk oil transportation. His first ship, the 'Murex', was the first tanker to pass through the Suez Canal in 1892 and this division of the company exists today as the Royal Dutch Shell Company; originally named the Shell Transport and Trading Company after the popular imports of sea shells of the time.

Hill Samuel & Co. Limited was created in 1965 by the merger of M. Samuel & Co. and Philip Hill, Higginson, Erlanger's Ltd. (the founders of which included Philip E. Hill (1873–1944), director and financial backer of Beecham Estates and Pills, Ltd., formed in May 1924; and Baron Frédéric Émile d'Erlanger).

On 10 December 1969 Hill Samuel Australia Limited opened its doors in Sydney with a staff of three executives. Offering a range of financial services and products with the expertise and fame of its parent company, Hill Samuel Australia began to win significant mandates. Following a proposal to the Australian Federal Government in 1985, Macquarie Bank Limited was established in February of that year as part of the restructure of Hill Samuel Australia as an independent trading bank. Macquarie Bank became one of the most successful diversified providers of financial products originating in Australia.

The bank decided to enter the UK securities market buying Wood MacKenzie, a stockbroker, in June 1984.

Before the merger with TSB Group Plc., Hill Samuel's 1987 Pre-tax profits were primarily of consisted of merchant banking (50%); as well as investment management services (27%); employee benefit services (13%); and insurance (6%).

In 1987, Hill Samuel had suspended trading in its shares on the London Stock Exchange amid signs that it would accept a merger bid from the Union Bank of Switzerland, as the two groups began takeover talks in July. However, by October of that year a final successful takeover bid was made by the TSB Group Plc., one of the United Kingdom's largest retail banks at the time.

By 1995, the merger of TSB Group and Lloyds Bank led Hill Samuel to become a subsidiary of Lloyds TSB, now restructured and renamed as Lloyds Banking Group.

== See also ==
- Macquarie Bank
- Royal Dutch Shell Company
