= Ennejma Ezzahra =

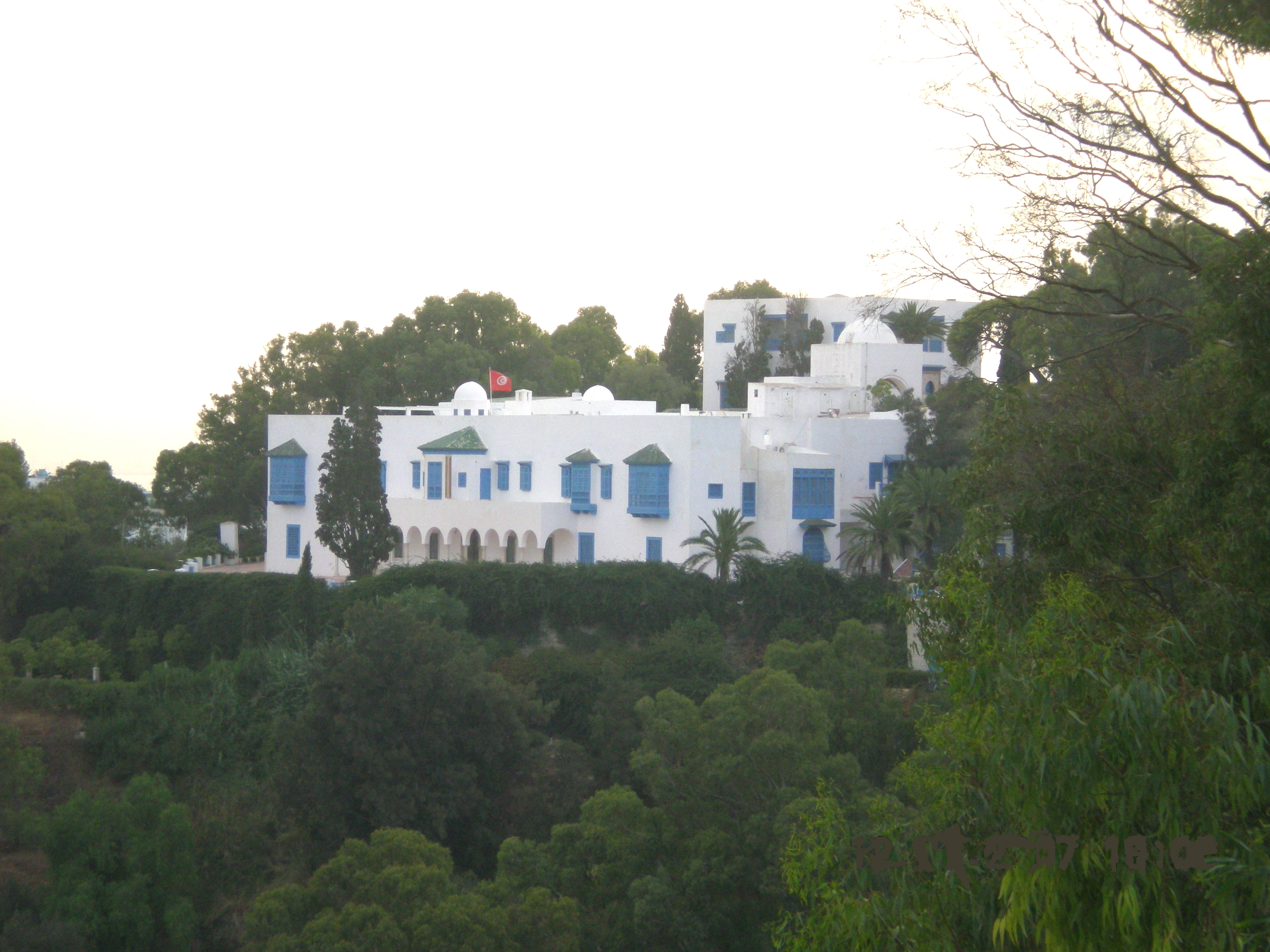
- View of Ennejma Ezzahra
- Interactive map of the Ennejma Ezzahra area
- Alternative names: Nejma Ezzohara

General information
- Type: palace, museum
- Location: Sidi Bou Said, Tunisia
- Coordinates: 36.86921°N 10.34821°E
- Construction started: 1912
- Completed: 1922
- Client: Baron Rodolphe d'Erlanger

Website
- www.ennejmaezzahra-tunisie.org

Warning bell on the lock on the museum's treasure chest
recorded April 2015

Ennejma Ezzahra ("Star of Venus"), sometimes spelled Nejma Ezzohara, also The Palace of the Baron d'Erlanger is a historical palace at Sidi Bou Said, in northern Tunisia, built from 1912–1922 by Baron Rodolphe d'Erlanger (1872–1932) as his home in Tunisia. It is considered to be an outstanding example of Moorish architecture in Tunisia and was built historic elements by craftsmen from Morocco and Tunisia. After the independence of Tunisia in 1956, it was the first museum to be opened in the country.

== History and present use as a centre for musical history ==
Since 1991, it houses the Centre des Musiques Arabes et Méditerranéennes (Centre for Arabic and Mediterranean Music), a museum and institution for the promotion of the country's musical heritage. Furthermore, it acts as a regular concert venue, and has a collection of historical musical instruments, books, recordings and other objects relating to the music of Tunisia. Many recordings of the centre's historical phonographic archives can be accessed and listened to on their Ennejma Ezzahra website.

During World War II, the building was occupied and looted by the German military, and further damage was done, when allied troops were billeted there later in the war.

Some years after the death of his son Leo Alfred Frédéric d'Erlanger (1898–1978), Leo's widow, Baroness Edwina d'Erlanger (née Prue; died 1994), sold it to the Tunisian government, and it is now preserved as a museum, with many of its original furnishings, including paintings by the Baron, and a treasure-chest reputedly once owned by Suleiman the Magnificent.

== Filming location ==
The palace has also been used for filming, including the making of the movie Justine, based on Lawrence Durrell's novel of that name.

== See also ==
- Music of Tunisia
- Music in Tunisian Arabic
