= Château Léoville-Poyferré =

Castle in France

Coordinates: 45.16409°N 0.74048°W

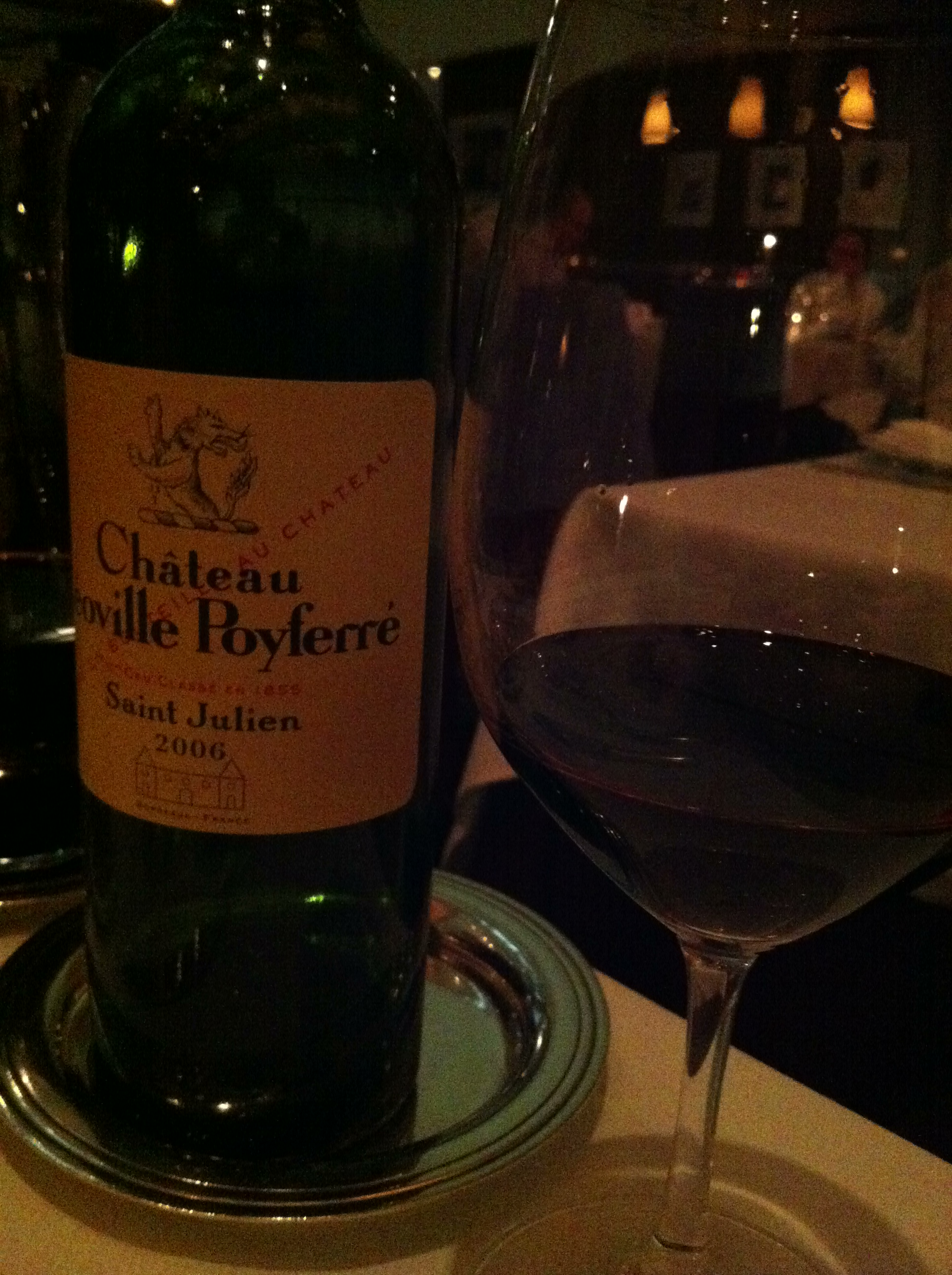
A 2006 Léoville-Poyferré.

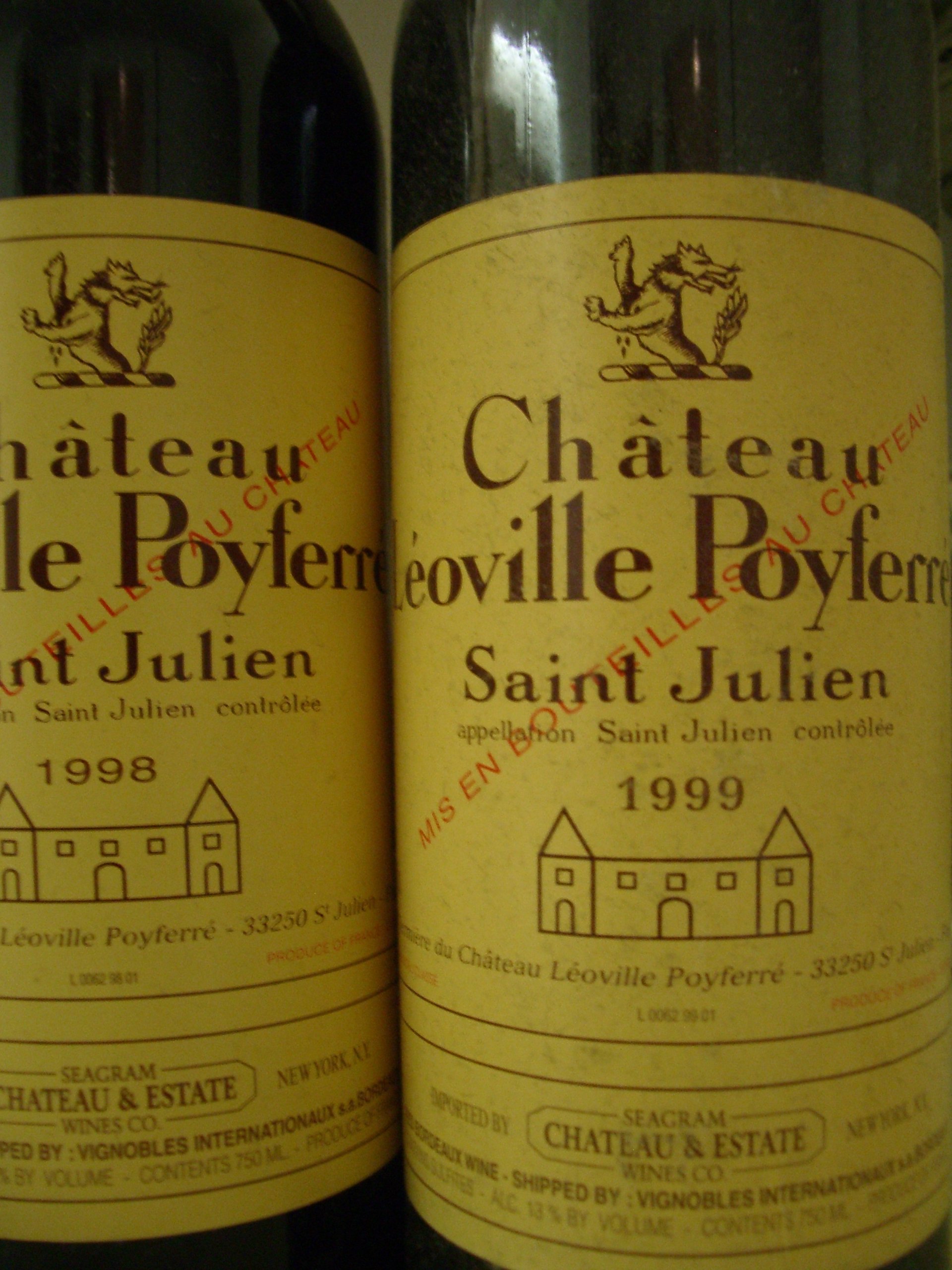
The Wine of Chateau Leoville Poyferre

Château Léoville-Poyferré is a winery in the Saint-Julien appellation of the Bordeaux region of France. Château Léoville-Poyferré is also the name of the red wine produced by this property. The wine produced here was classified as one of fifteen Deuxièmes Crus (Second Growths) in the original Bordeaux Wine Official Classification of 1855.

== History ==
Léoville-Poyferré was once part of the much larger Léoville estate until the time of the French Revolution when it was separated into Château Léoville-Las Cases and Château Léoville-Barton. In 1840, Château Léoville-Las Cases was again divided forming Château Léoville-Poyferré which went to Baron de Poyferré when he married the daughter of Jean de Las-Cases.
