= Emile Beaumont d'Erlanger =

French-born British merchant banker (1866–1939)

Baron Emile Beaumont d'Erlanger
- Born: 4 June 1866; France
- Died: 24 July 1939 (aged 73)
- Occupation: Merchant banker

Baron Emile Beaumont d'Erlanger (4 June 1866 – 24 July 1939) was a French-born British merchant banker.

== Life ==
He was the second eldest son of Frédéric Emile d'Erlanger, a banker working in Paris at the French branch of Emile Erlanger and Company and Marguerite Mathilde Slidell (1842–1927). (See: Erlanger family tree).

His older brother, Baron Raphael Slidell d'Erlanger, who might have been more likely to follow his father into banking, was instead a scientist and professor at Heidelberg. Emile followed the banking route and from his father he was entrusted with presidency of the railway and tramway companies including the New General Traction Company in England.

In 1891, he became a naturalised British subject.

From 1911, he was chairman of the Channel Tunnel Company (the predecessor of EuroTunnel) and financed its design.

The company also financed the building of railways in Rhodesia, Angola and the Congo.

== Family ==
In Paris in 1895, he married Rose Marie Antoinette Katherine (Kate) Robert d'Aqueria de Rochegude (1874–1959). She was the daughter of a landowner and shipowner in Le Havre.

They lived in Falconwood, Woolwich, near Shooters Hill, south-east London, and also at 139 Piccadilly, the former home of Lord Byron. Later they moved to America and lived in Beverly Hills. His wife, the Baroness, was a patron of the arts, supporting artists such as Cecil Beaton, Romaine Brooks, and Sergei Diaghilev.

The couple had five children,

- Robert (called Robin) Emile Frédéric Regis d'Erlanger (1896–1934)
- Mary Liliane Matilda, called Baba, Baroness d'Erlanger (1901–1945),
- Maria Bianca Muriel Iris d'Erlanger, (1904–1905),
- Gerard John Regis Leo Baron d'Erlanger (1905–1962), a director of the British Overseas Airways Corporation (BOAC) and head of the Air Transport Auxiliary during World War II; his daughter Mary "Minnie" Caroline d'Erlanger married Winston Churchill, the grandson of Prime Minister Sir Winston Churchill
- Bianca, Baroness d'Erlanger.
