= Palazzo Acciaiuoli =

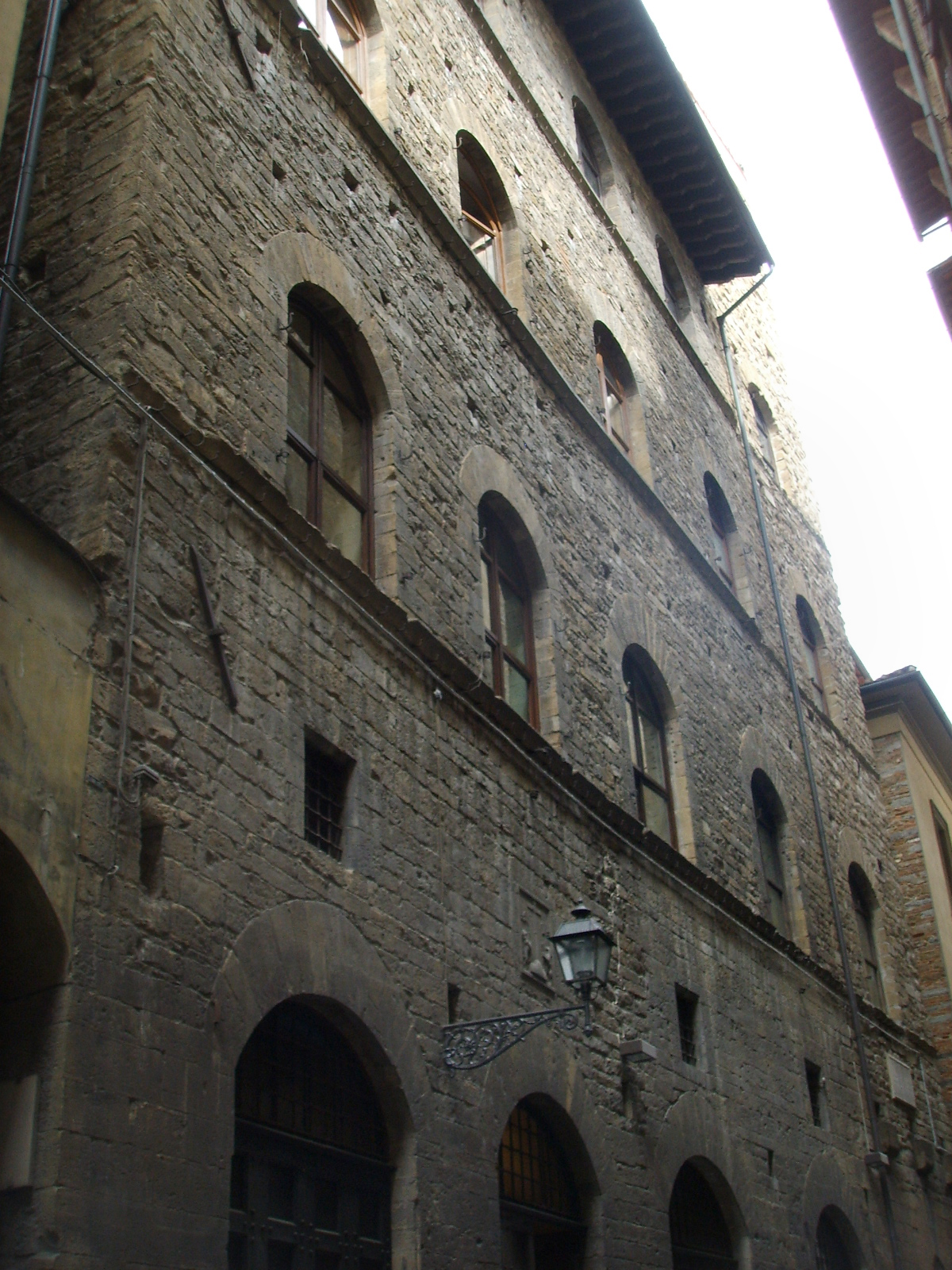
- Palazzo Acciaiuoli
- Interactive map of the Palazzo Acciaiuoli area
- Alternative names: Palazzo Usimbardi, Usimbardi-Acciaiuoli

General information
- Status: In use
- Type: Palace
- Architectural style: Mannerist
- Location: Florence, Toscana, Italy, 9, via Borgo Santi Apostoli
- Coordinates: 43.769175°N 11.253308°E
- Current tenants: hotel
- Construction started: 1280
- Renovated: 1341

Palazzo Acciaiuoli, also known as Palazzo Usimbardi' or Usimbardi-Acciaiuoli, is located in Borgo Santi Apostoli in the historical centre of Florence. It incorporates the older Torre degli Acciaiuoli, formerly dei Buondelmonti, located at the corner of Chiasso delle Misure. Today it houses a hotel.

== The tower ==
Built by the Buondelmonti around 1280, it belonged to Niccolò Acciaiuoli, Grand Siniscalco of the Kingdom of Naples, who included it in his palace in 1341, becoming one of the oldest buildings owned by the powerful Florentine family of Acciaiuoli. At the end of the 16th century, it passed to the Colle di Val d'Elsa family of Usimbardi (family).

In 1864 and 1920, the tower underwent restoration works (those of the second decade of the twentieth century directed by architect Ugo Giusti) that privileged the medieval components and determined its current appearance.

The tower is among the tallest in Florence: narrow and covered by the typical stone filaretto, it has a door surmounted by a monolithic architrave on two moulded corbels. Above it opens a ring (architecture) with a pointed arch.

== The palace ==
Also known as the Grand Siniscalco Palace from the name of its founder, it is built of stone with large, regular mouldings on the ground floor and filaretto stone on the upper floors. It has the appearance of a fortress, rather austere, and is reminiscent of the Bargello. Three orders of arched windows, emphasised by string-course cornices, punctuate the façade, which must have been among the most majestic in the city at the time.

The façade also bears the coat of arms of the Carthusian monks of Niccolò Acciaiuoli, which features two lions holding lily flags; in the centre is the cross of Calvary and the inscription Certosa recalling the foundation of the Certosa di Firenze on the initiative of Acciaiuoli, who donated this very palace for the use of the Carthusian monks.

There also rests a plaque from 1930 with a part in Italian commemorating the Acciaiuoli family and one in Latin describing the location of the palazzo, as written in the Florentine Archive of the «Charterhouse Papers».

All’interno corre una scala in legno alla quale si accede dal palazzo. Sulla sommità si trovano due terrazze panoramiche a livelli diversi.

Alla morte di Niccolò il palazzo passò quindi ai monaci della Certosa, che lo possedettero fino alla soppressione degli ordini monastici all’inizio dell’Ottocento. Venne messo in vendita e passò in diverse mani, tra le quali i Burresi Pettini furono gli ultimi, che ancora lo posseggono e lo usano in parte per un’attività alberghiera.

== Details ==
- The Acciaiuoli family had another large palace in this area, also on borgo Santi Apostoli but on the opposite side, so as to have a façade also on the Arno, in particular on the Lungarno degli Acciaiuoli that still takes its name from it. This building, like many others, was destroyed by the retreating Germans in the summer of 1944, who undermined the access areas to the Ponte Vecchio.

== Other images ==
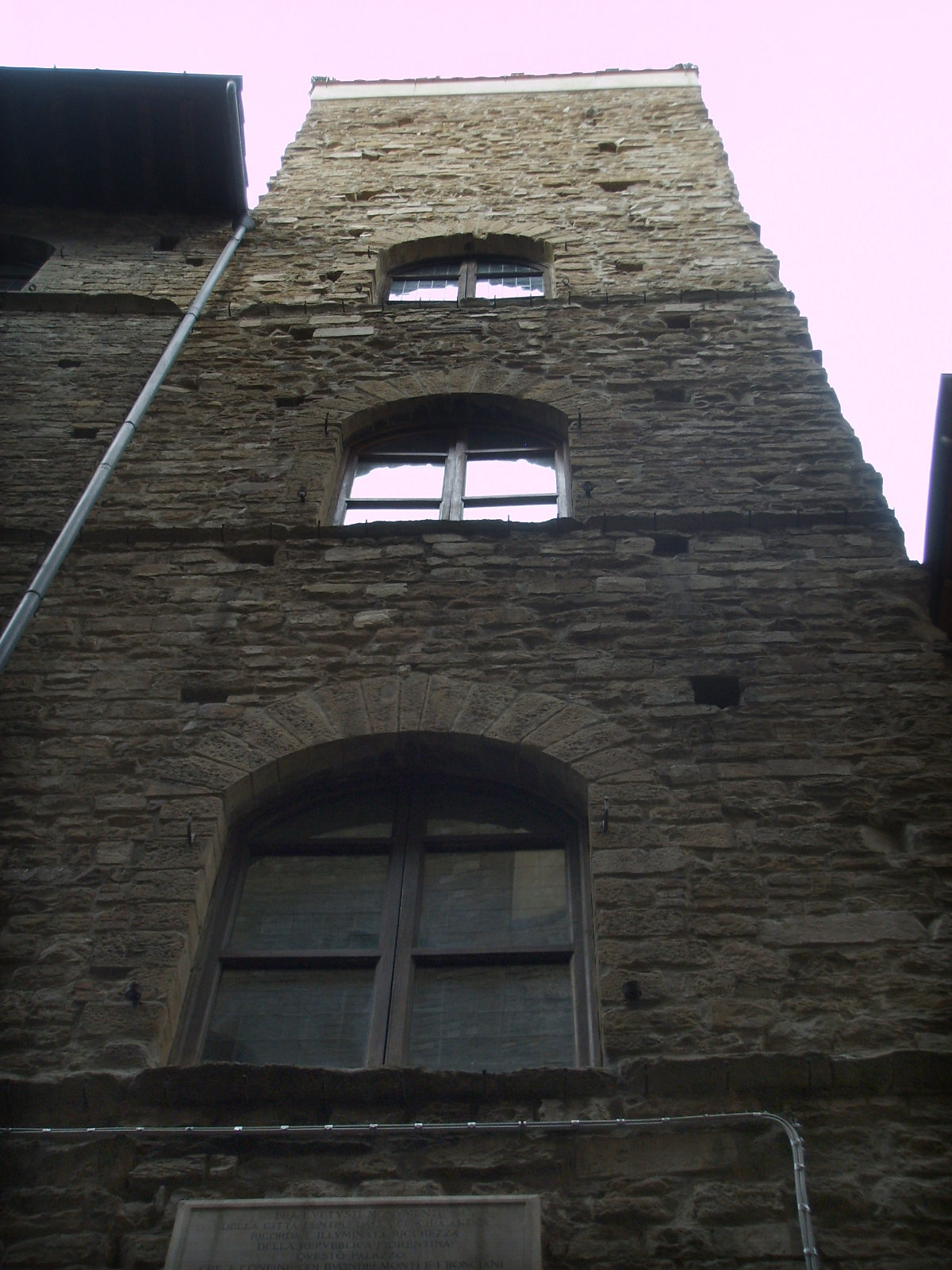
The Acciaiuoli Tower

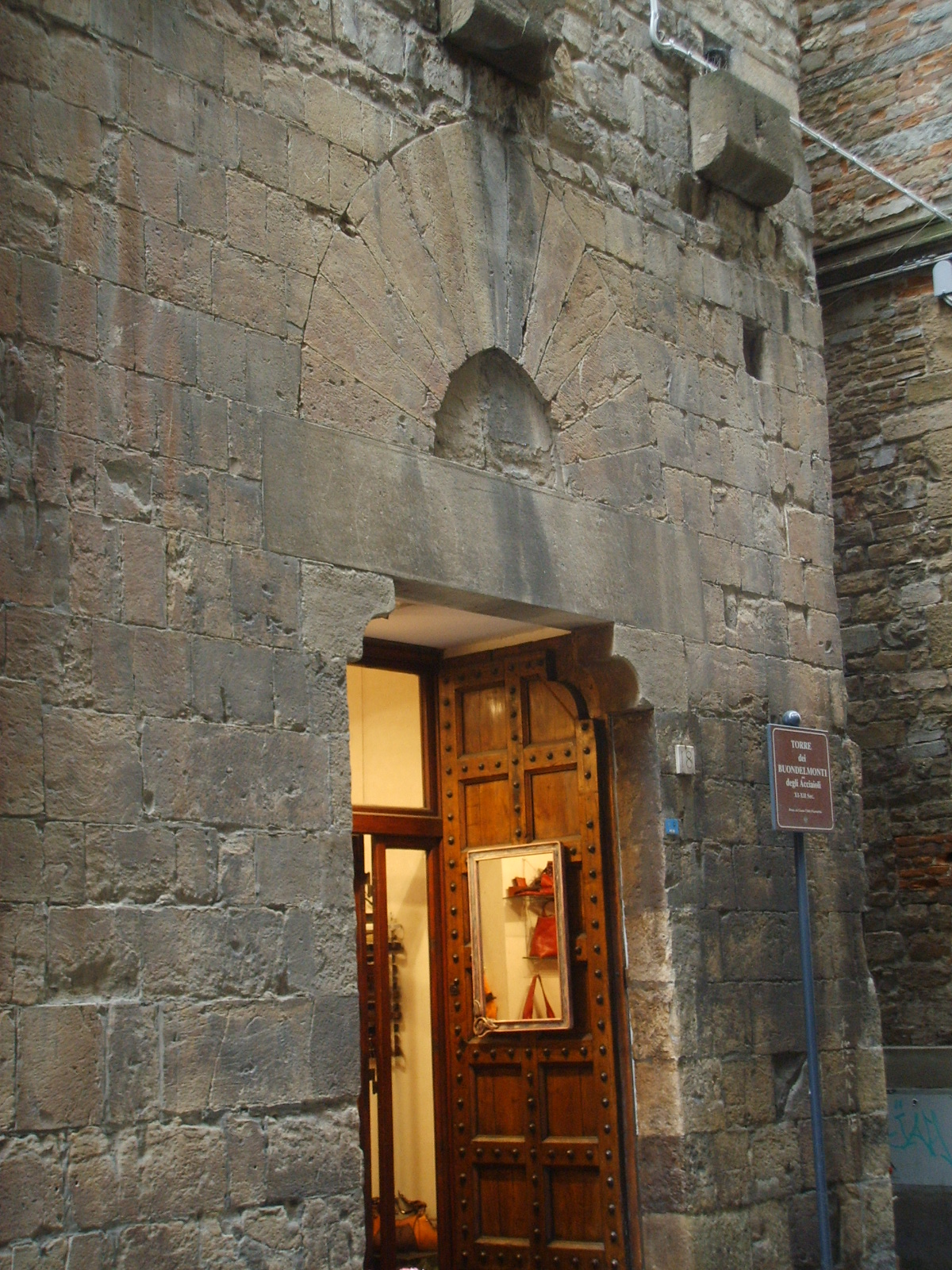
The portal

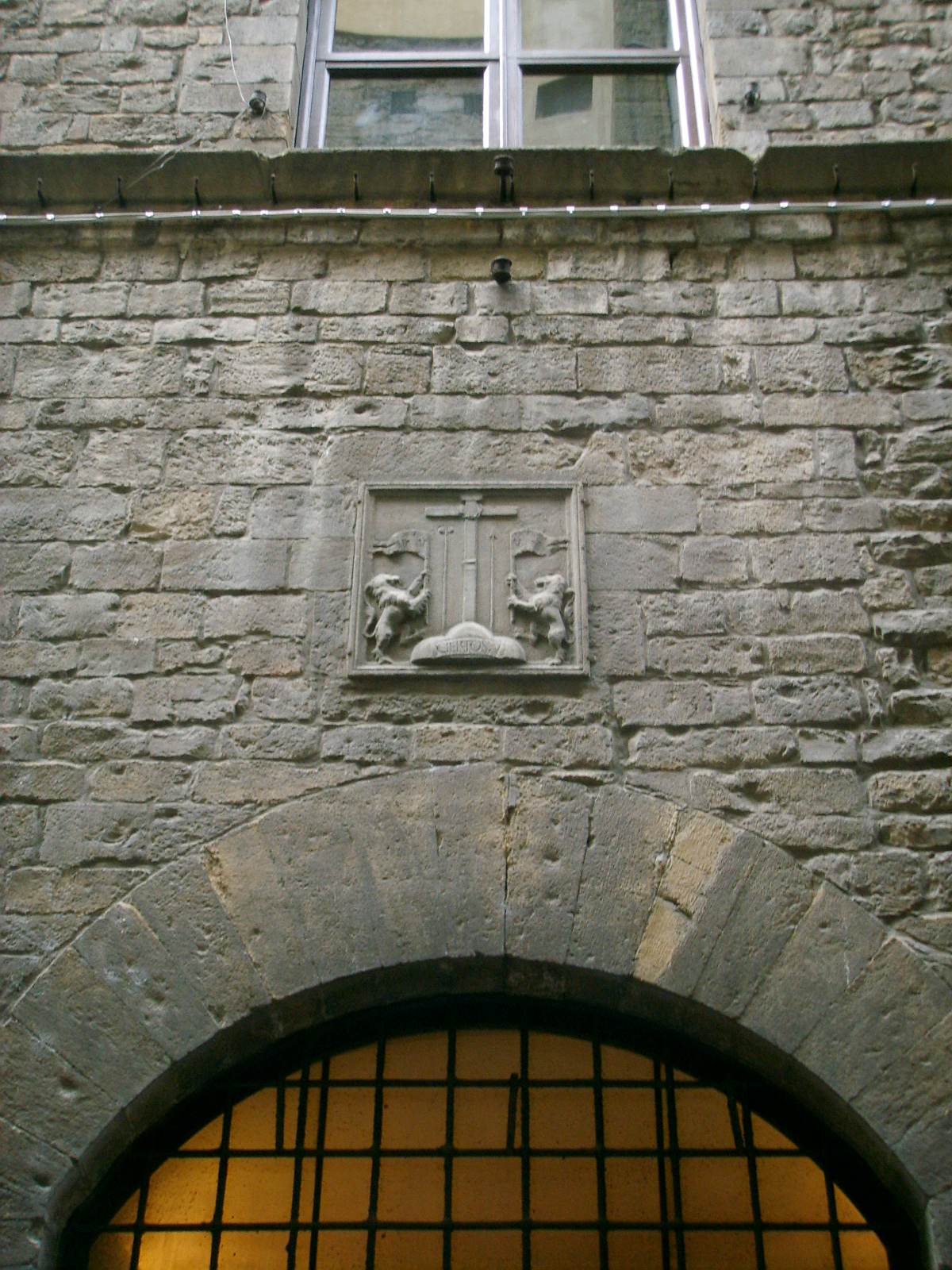
The Certosa plaque

Stemma of the Acciaiuoli

== Sources ==
=== Italian sources ===
- Giampaolo Trotta, Gli antichi chiassi tra Ponte Vecchio e Santa Trinita, Messaggerie Toscane, Firenze 1992.
- Marcello Vannucci, Splendidi palazzi di Firenze, Le Lettere, Firenze 1995.
- Lara Mercanti, Giovanni Straffi, Le torri di Firenze e del suo territorio, Alinea, Firenze 2003
- Fortunato Grimaldi, Le "case-torri" di Firenze, Edizioni Tassinari, Firenze 2005.
