= Torre degli Amidei =

Historic tower in Florence, Italy

Coordinates: 43°46′08″N 11°15′13″E

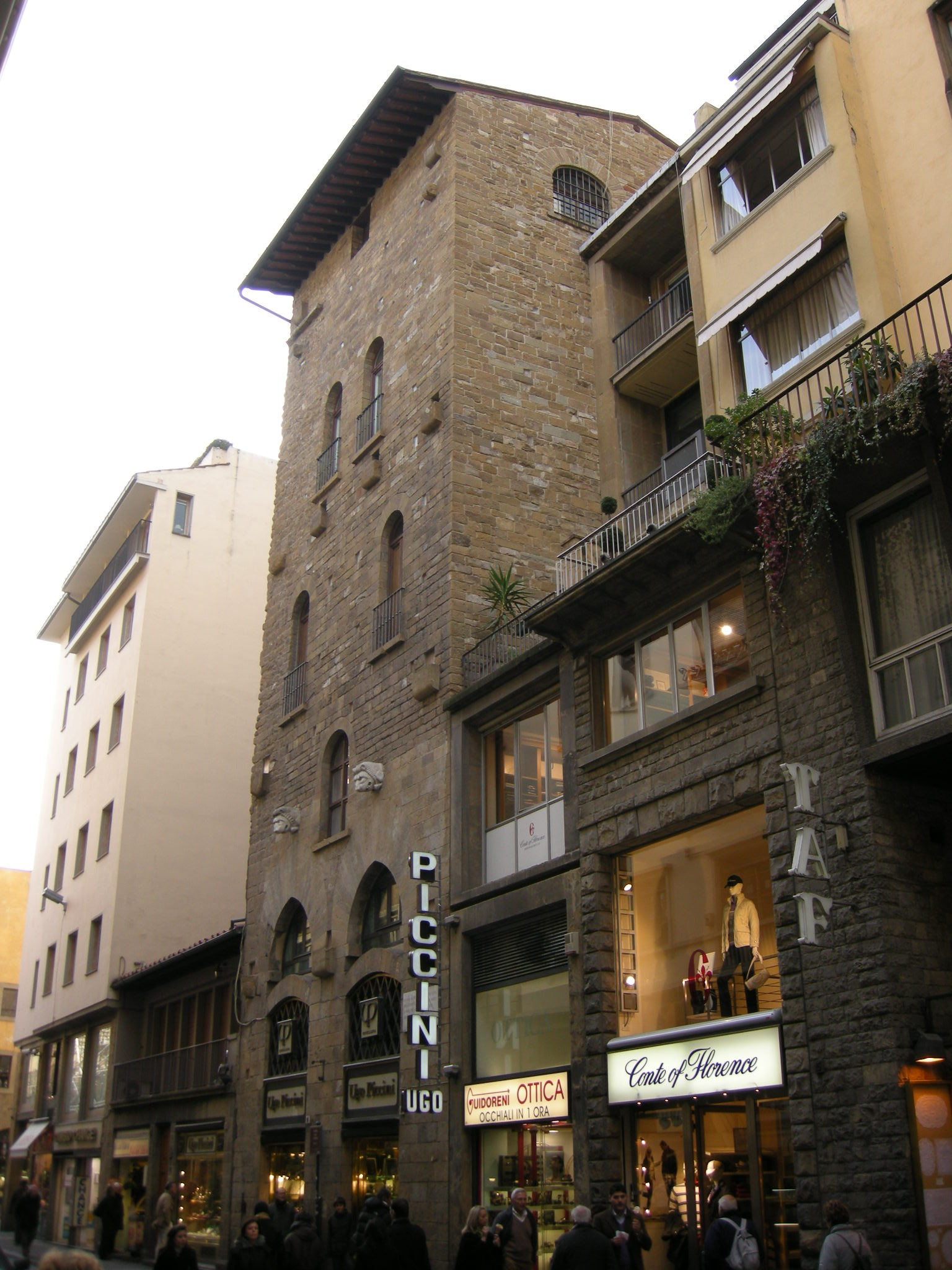
Torre degli Amidei.

The Torre degli Amidei is a tower in Florence, Italy. Dating from the upper Middle Ages, it is located near the Piazza della Signoria. Once located near the city's ancient walls, it belonged to the Amidei family, and, according to the tradition, was the alleged location of the killing of Buondelmonte de' Buondelmonti by one Amidei.

In 1944 it was damaged by the retreating German Army, and was later partially rebuilt. Its current appearance and decoration (including the double, superimposed arches of the entrances) dates also from 19th century restorations. Above the doors are two lion heads, one of which is original and is perhaps from Etruscan times.

== Sources ==
- Grimaldi, Fortunato (2005). Le "case-torri" di Firenze. Florence: Edizioni Tassinari.
