= Portrait of Lorenzo the Magnificent =

c. 1534 painting by Giorgio Vasari

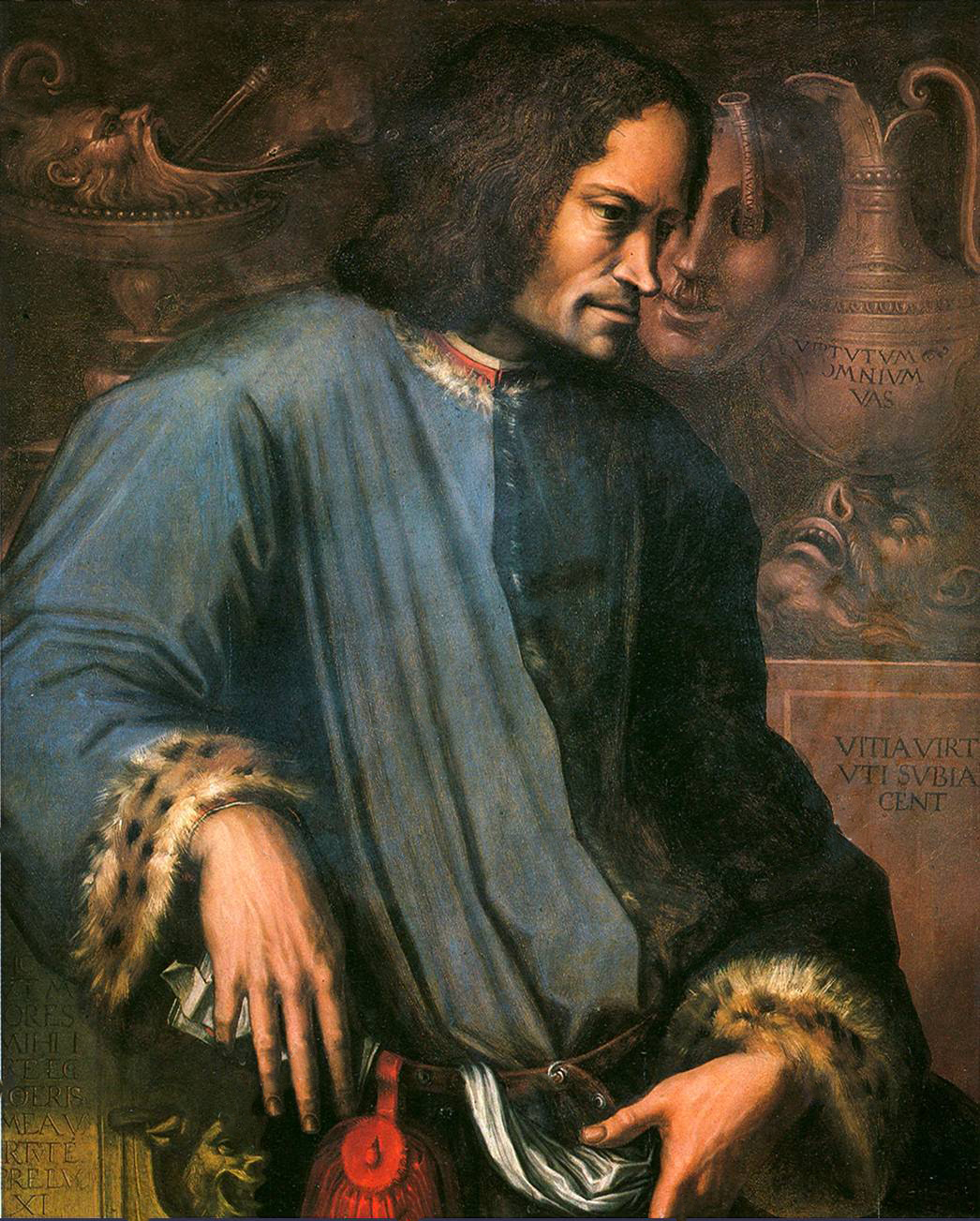
- Artist: Giorgio Vasari
- Year: c. 1534
- Medium: Oil on wood
- Dimensions: 90 cm × 72 cm (35 in × 28 in)
- Location: Uffizi, Florence

The Portrait of Lorenzo the Magnificent is an oil-on-wood painting by Italian artist Giorgio Vasari, created around 1534. It is housed in the Uffizi, in Florence.

== History and description ==
The painting was commissioned by Vasari's patron Ottaviano de' Medici, and is a posthumous portrait of Lorenzo de' Medici, the ruler of the Republic of Florence, who had died in 1492. The portrait is similar in style to the one of Cosimo the Elder by Pontormo.

Lorenzo de' Medici, wearing a tunic with a collar and ermine sleeves, is represented seated, in profile, with a distant gaze, his face slightly bent, giving him more the attitude of a thinker or a philosopher than of a political leader.

Lorenzo is surrounded by various ancient objects bearing sentences in Latin. The sentence on the vase at the top right above the mask of Vice reads "virtutum omnium vas", which means "vessel of all the virtues", while the one on the top of the column at the bottom left translates as "As my ancestors did for me, I enlightened my descendants by my virtue". He appears in a Chiaroscuro background, with several symbolic objects in bronze color: a ciborium at the top left collecting the head of gossip, with a bottle brush in the throat, ewer of Virtue, followed by the mask of Music, with a flute in the eye and snot in the nose, while the decomposed head of the Philosopher appears under the text of Virtue. The top of the column on which Lorenzo's arm rests surmounts the grotesque figure of the Lie, all figures that Vasari himself commented on.

This is a so-called split portrait: a resembling portrait, accompanied by symbolic objects, making it a complex object on two levels.
