= Buondelmonti =

Buondelmonti may refer to:

== People ==
- Buondelmonte de' Buondelmonti, Florentine young nobleman
- Cristoforo Buondelmonti, Italian monk and traveler
- Esau de' Buondelmonti, medieval ruler of Epirus
- Giorgio de' Buondelmonti, medieval ruler of Epirus
- Giuseppe Maria Buondelmonti, Italian poet, orator and philosopher

== Other ==
- Torre dei Buondelmonti, a medieval tower in Florence, Italy
- Palazzo Buondelmonti, a palace in Piazza Santa Trinita, Florence, Italy
