= Cristoforo Buondelmonti =

Italian writer and geographer (c. 1385 – c. 1430)

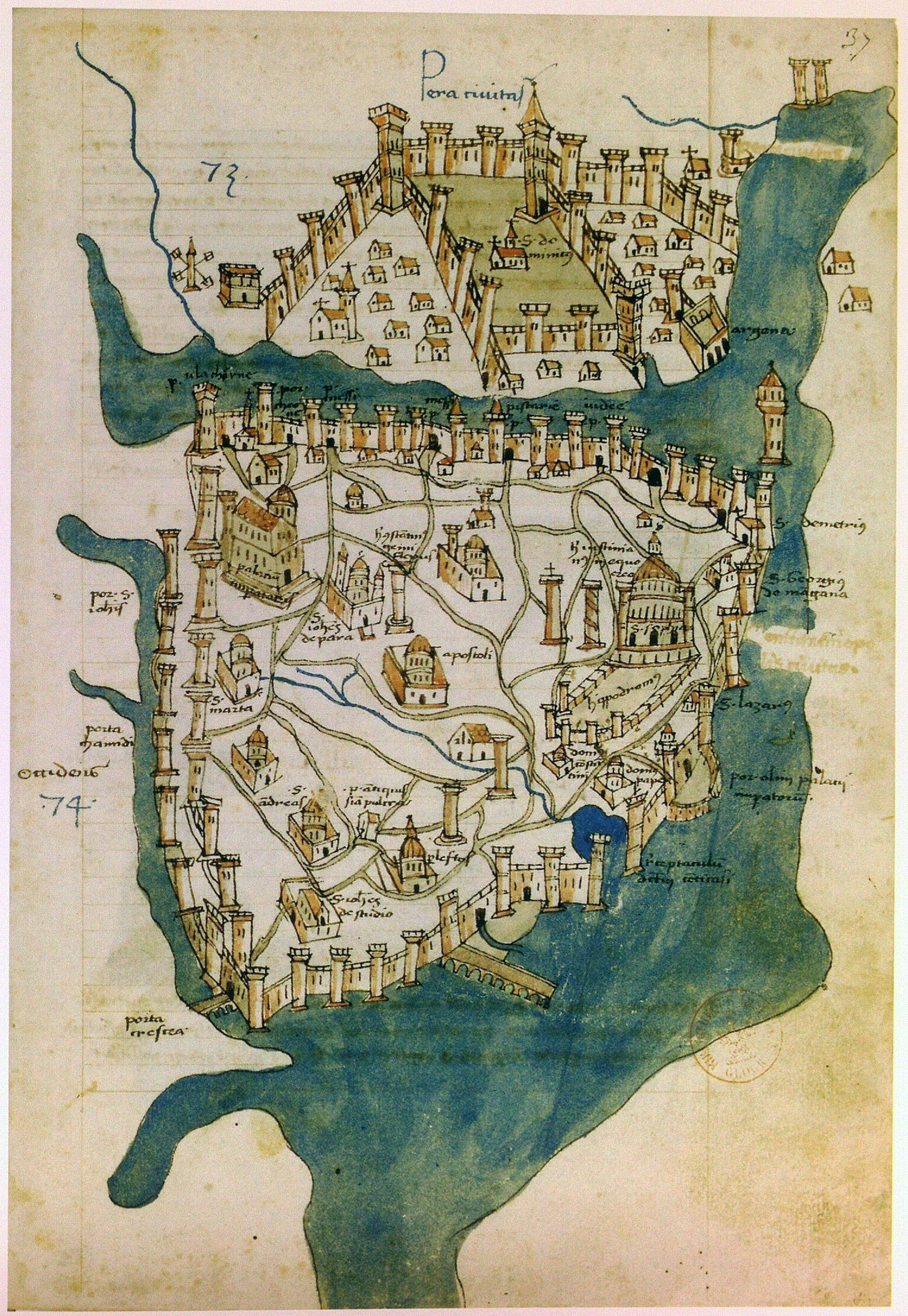
Map of Constantinople (1422) by Buondelmonti, contained in Liber insularum Archipelagi (Bibliothèque nationale de France, Paris) is the oldest surviving map of the city, and the only one which antedates the Turkish conquest of the city in 1453

Cristoforo Buondelmonti (c. 1385 – c. 1430) was an Italian Franciscan priest, traveler, and was a pioneer in promoting first-hand knowledge of Greece and its antiquities throughout the Western world.

== Biography ==
Cristoforo Buondelmonti was born around 1385 into an important Florentine family. He was taught Greek by the Italian scholar Guarino da Verona and received further education from Niccolò Niccoli, an influential Florentine humanist. By 1414, he had become a priest and served as a rector of a church in Florence.

Buondelmonti left his native city around 1414 in order to travel. While travels were mainly focused on the Aegean Islands, he visited Constantinople in the 1420s. He went on to author two historical-geographic works: the Descriptio insulae Cretae (1417, in collaboration with Niccolò Niccoli) and the Liber insularum Archipelagi (1420). These two books are a combination of geographical information and contemporary charts and sailing directions. The latter one contains the oldest surviving map of Constantinople, and the only one which antedates the Ottoman conquest of the city in 1453.

During his expeditions, Buondelmonti bought hundreds of Greek manuscript and brought them back with him to Italy. Among the most rare and valuable, there was the only surviving copy of the Description of Greece by Pausanias, or the later became known as the Hieroglyphica of Horapollo, which played a considerable role both in humanistic thinking and in art.

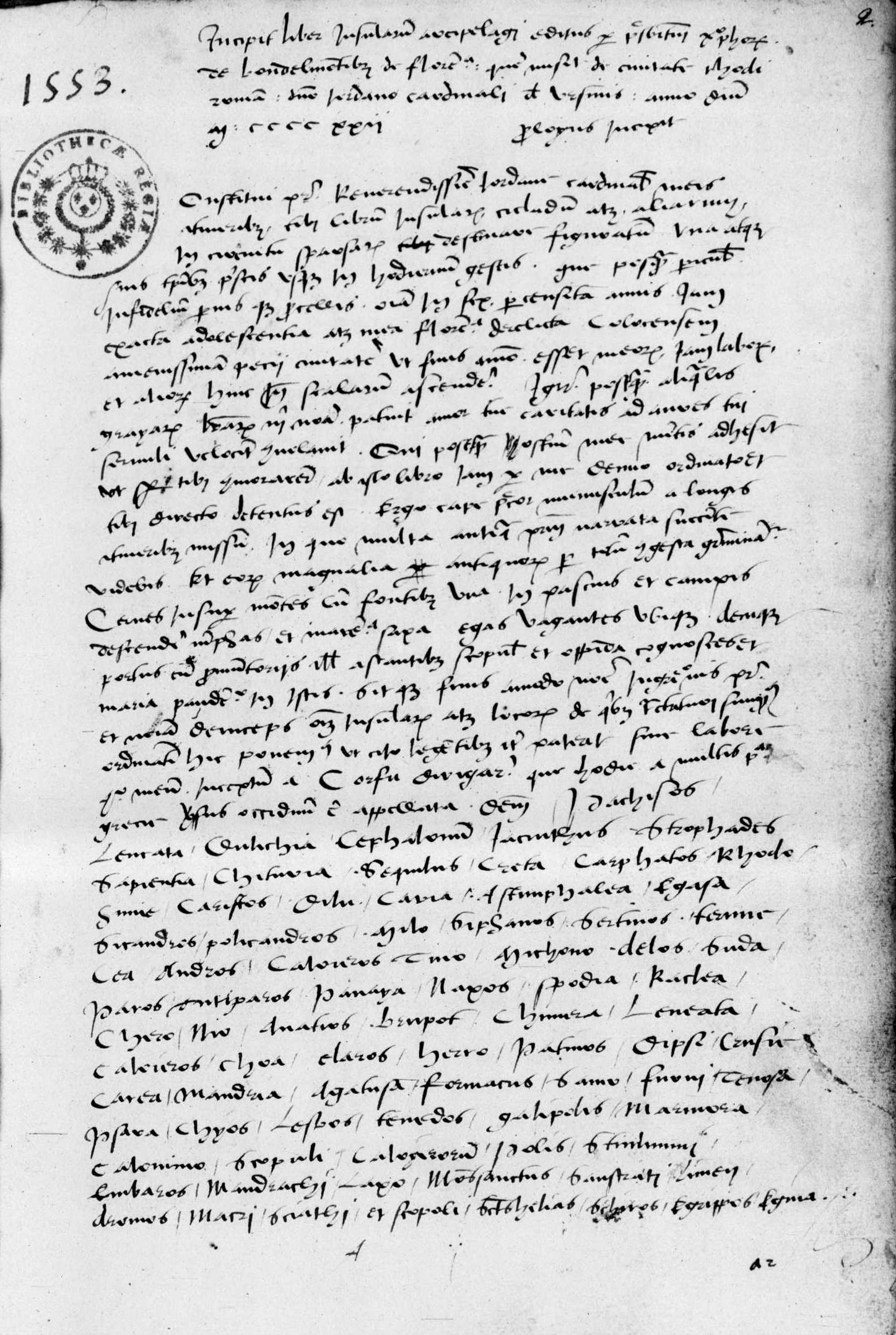
Liber insularum Arcipelagi, 16th-century manuscript. Paris, Bibliothèque nationale de France, Fonds latin.

== See also ==
- The Buondelmonti, a noble family of Florence

== Sources ==
- Bessi, Benedetta (2013). "Cristoforo Buondelmonti: Greek Antiquities in Florentine Humanism". The Historical Review/La Revue Historique. 9: 63. doi:10.12681/hr.289. hdl:10278/3731319. ISSN 1791-7603.
- Gothoni, Rene (2003). "Buondelmonti, Cristoforo". In Speake, Jennifer (ed.). Literature of Travel and Exploration: A to F. Fitzroy Dearborn. pp. 140–141. ISBN 9781579584252.
- Harvey, P. D. A. (2007). "Local and Regional Cartography in Medieval Europe". In Woodward, David (ed.). The History of Cartography, Volume 1: Cartography in Prehistoric, Ancient, and Medieval Europe and the Mediterranean, Part 3 (PDF). University of Chicago. pp. 482–484. ISBN 978-0-226-90734-5.
- Thomov, Thomas (1996). "New Information about Cristoforo Buondelmonti's Drawings of Constantinople". Byzantion. 66 (2): 431–453. ISSN 0378-2506. JSTOR 44172289.
- G. Gerola, "Le vedute di Costantinopoli di Cristoforo Buondelmonti," SBN 3 (1931): 247–79.
- Cristoforo Buondelmonti, Description of the Aegean and Other Islands at Google Books
