= Barbiellini =

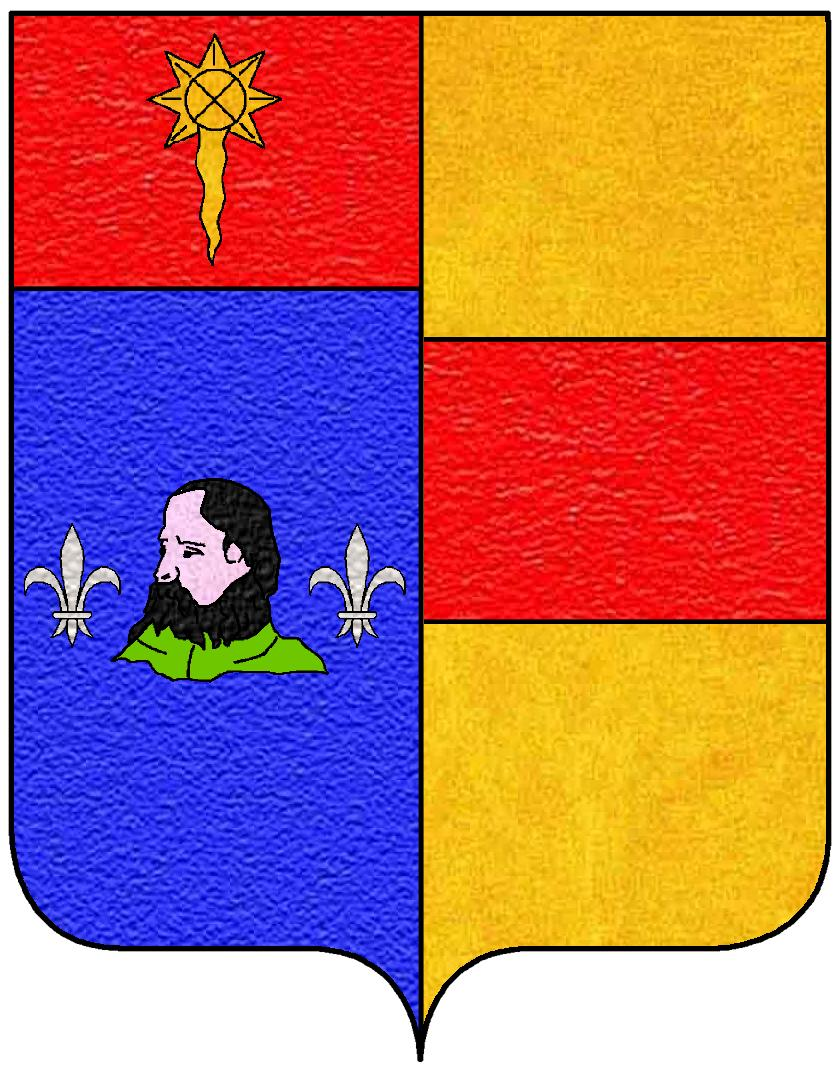
Coat of arms of the Barbiellini-Amidei family

The Barbiellini family is an Italian noble family. They intermarried with the Amidei family and became known as the Barbiellini-Amidei family. Members of the family held the title of Count in Italy.

== Notable members ==
- Alessandro, Conte Barbiellini-Amidei reportedly volunteered to sell a property he owned, a wedge-shaped site on the western peak of the Aventine, for the construction of the Sant'Anselmo all'Aventino church, monastery, and college in Rome.
- Bernardo dei Conti Barbiellini-Amidei (1896-1940), was a prominent Fascist and founded a dopolavoro or Fascist workers' club.
