= Torre dei Mannelli =

Tower in Florence, Italy

Coordinates: 43°46′3.13″N 11°15′10.65″E

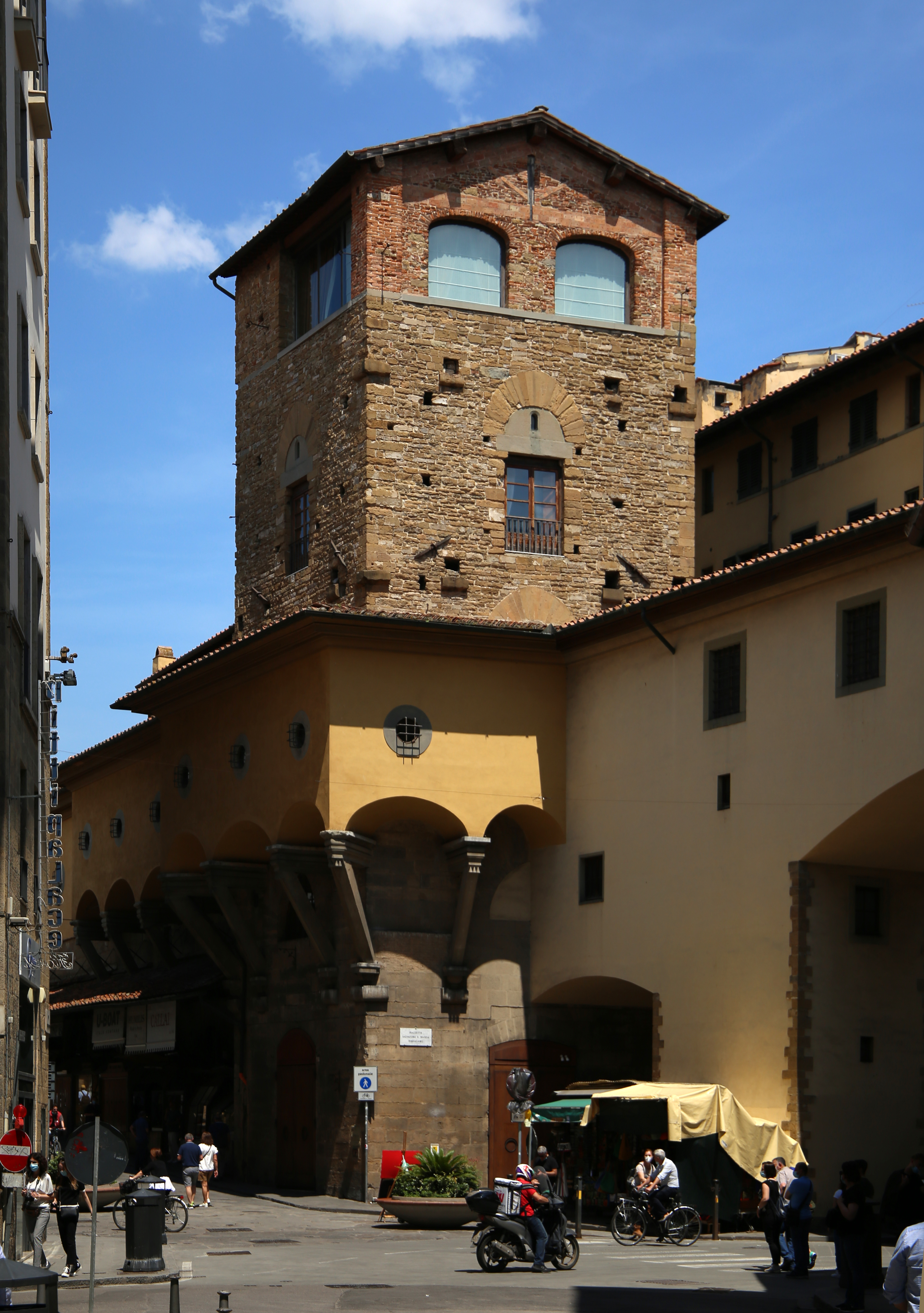
Corridoio Vasariano and the Torre dei Mannelli

The Torre dei Mannelli is a small tower on the southeast corner of the Ponte Vecchio bridge in Florence, Italy. It is the only survivor of the four towers that once defended each corner of the bridge. In 1565, the Mannelli family refused to have it altered or demolished so that the Vasari Corridor (a corridor commissioned by duke Cosimo I de' Medici to join the Uffizi with Palazzo Pitti on the other side of the river) could be built in a straight line. Instead the corridor swerved round it on brackets.

The tower was damaged during World War II and was restored by architect Nello Baroni in 1944-1946. The ground floor now houses a gelateria.

== Sources ==
- Grimaldi, Fortunato (2005). Le "case-torri" di Firenze. Florence: Edizioni Tassinari.
