= Amidei =

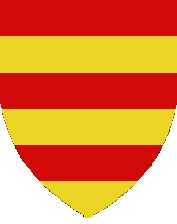
Coat of arms of the Amidei family

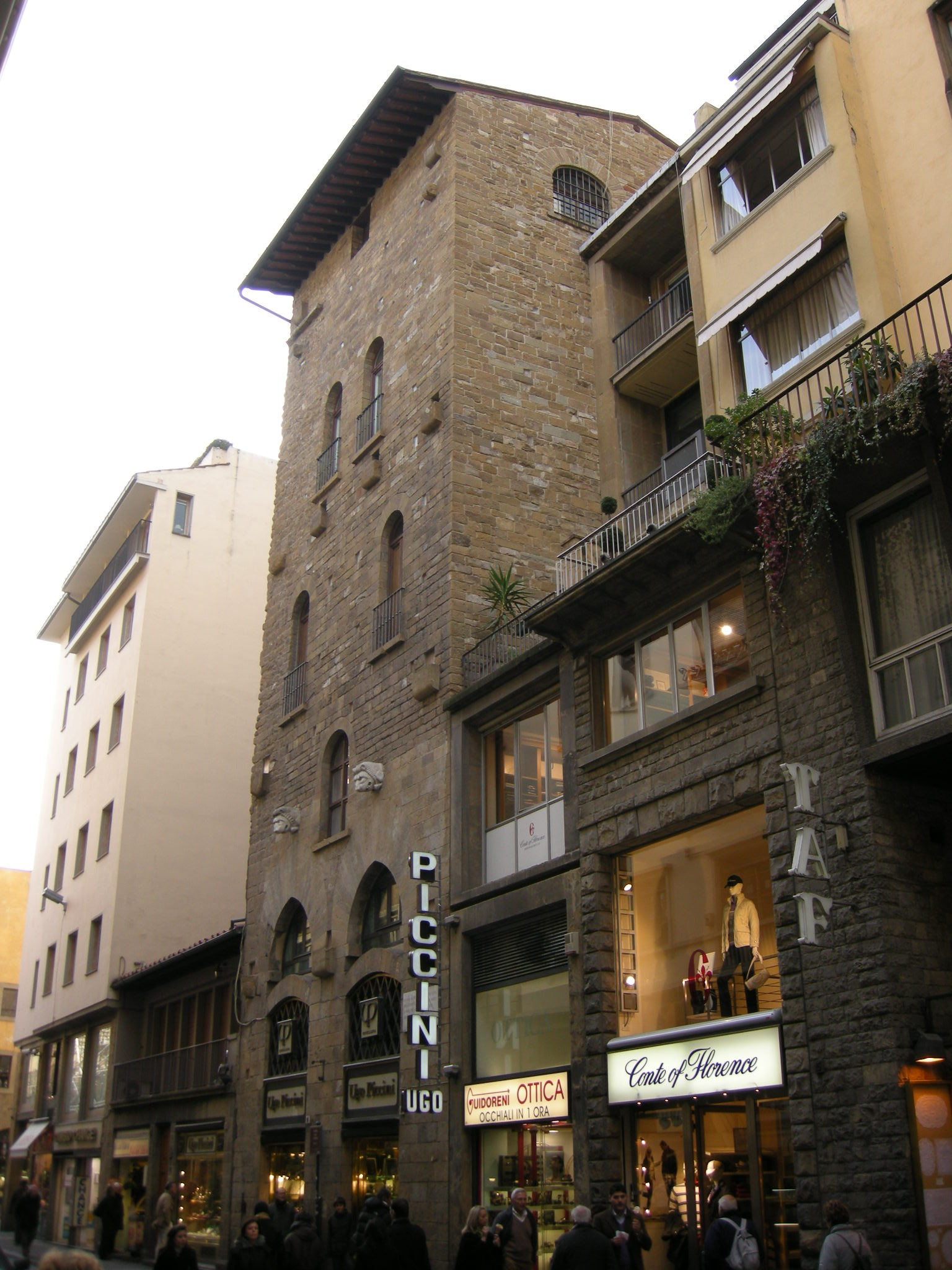
Torre degli Amidei, near the Piazza della Signoria, most probable location of the assassination of Buondelmonte de' Buondelmonti

The Amidei family was an ancient Italian noble family from Florence, Italy. The family was of Roman descent but lived in Florence since its foundation. They have been described by Niccolò Machiavelli as being one of the most powerful families of its time, and were featured in Dante's poems on the political struggles of the Guelphs and Ghibellines in medieval Italy. Ancestors of the House of Piccolomini, Patricians of Siena, they married into the Medici family during the 20th century. The Amidei also claimed a Julia gens (Gens Iulia) ancestry, through the Cottius family, Patricians of Rome.

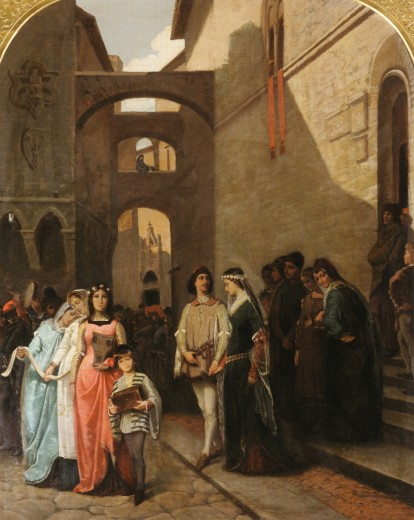
Marriage of Buondelmonte by Saverio Altamura.

== History ==
The Amidei were a prominent family in Florence and Tuscany. They owned lands and a castle in Mugnana. The family business began as production of olive oil and wine, and had developed into banking. In fact there was one or more wills in which the father stated he was leaving some credits that had to be withdrawn. In 1182, Bongianni of the Amidei was a Florentine councillor. In the early thirteenth century, the Amidei were allied with the Ghibelline faction, led by the Uberti and Lamberti families. Their stronghold was on via Por San Maria, which connected the Ponte Vecchio to the Mercato Nuovo and Mercato Vecchio. The remains of their tower, Torre degli Amidei, can still be seen.

The Amidei are best remembered for a particular event occurring at a 1215 banquet in Florence during the Guelf and Ghibelline conflicts, an era of war between the Pope and the Holy Roman Emperor, such as Frederick Barbarossa and his successors. At the celebration, one of the guests, Buondelmonte de' Buondelmonti, stabbed a rival in the arm. As restitution for the injury and dishonor, the elders at the banquet decided that the young Buondelmonte must wed a girl from the Amidei family. That arranged, the Amidei and Buondelmonti families agreed that Buondelmonte had to publicly pledge troth to the Amidei maiden; however, with the Amidei assembled in the piazza, the young Buondelmonte on his horse bypassed past the Amidei, and instead asked for the hand of a girl from the Donati family, who were members of the Guelf faction. Furious, the Amidei and their allies plotted revenge. They debated whether they should scar Buondelmonte's face, beat him up, or kill him. Mosca di Lamberti took the floor and argued that they should kill him at the place where he had dishonoured them. His famous words, 'cosa fatta capo ha', were recorded in Dante's Inferno and an earlier chronicle known as Pseudo-Latini. On Easter morning on his way to marry the Donati girl, as Buondelmonte crossed the Ponte Vecchio, he was ambushed and murdered by the Amidei and their Ghibelline allies. The Buondelmonte murder and its associated clan rivalry became the legendary origin of the Guelf and Ghibelline conflict in Florence, but early 14th century chroniclers, including Dino Compagni and Giovanni Villani, manipulated the story to lay blame for the conflict on one group or another.

In 1532, in his book Florentine Histories, Niccolò Machiavelli referred to the Amideis as being one of the most powerful families of Florence, along with the Buondelmontis, the Ubertis and the Donatis. The ouvrage was commissioned by Cardinal Giulio de' Medici, later known as Pope Clement VII, Patron of Michelangelo, Raphael, Copernicus, and Leonardo da Vinci.

On 20 April 1749, Maddalena Amidei married Carlo Barbiellini and they agreed to keep her name, since she was one of the last descendants of the Amidei, along with Cosimo Amidei and Gaspero Amidei. Modern descendants includes italian screenwriter Sergio Amidei (1904-1981), and Gaspare Barbiellini Amidei (1934-2007), husband of Clarice de Medici Tornaquinci, a cadet branch of the House of Medici. His parents were Bernardo Barbiellini Amidei and Anna Maria Pullè, son of Count Gasparo.

== Tradition ==
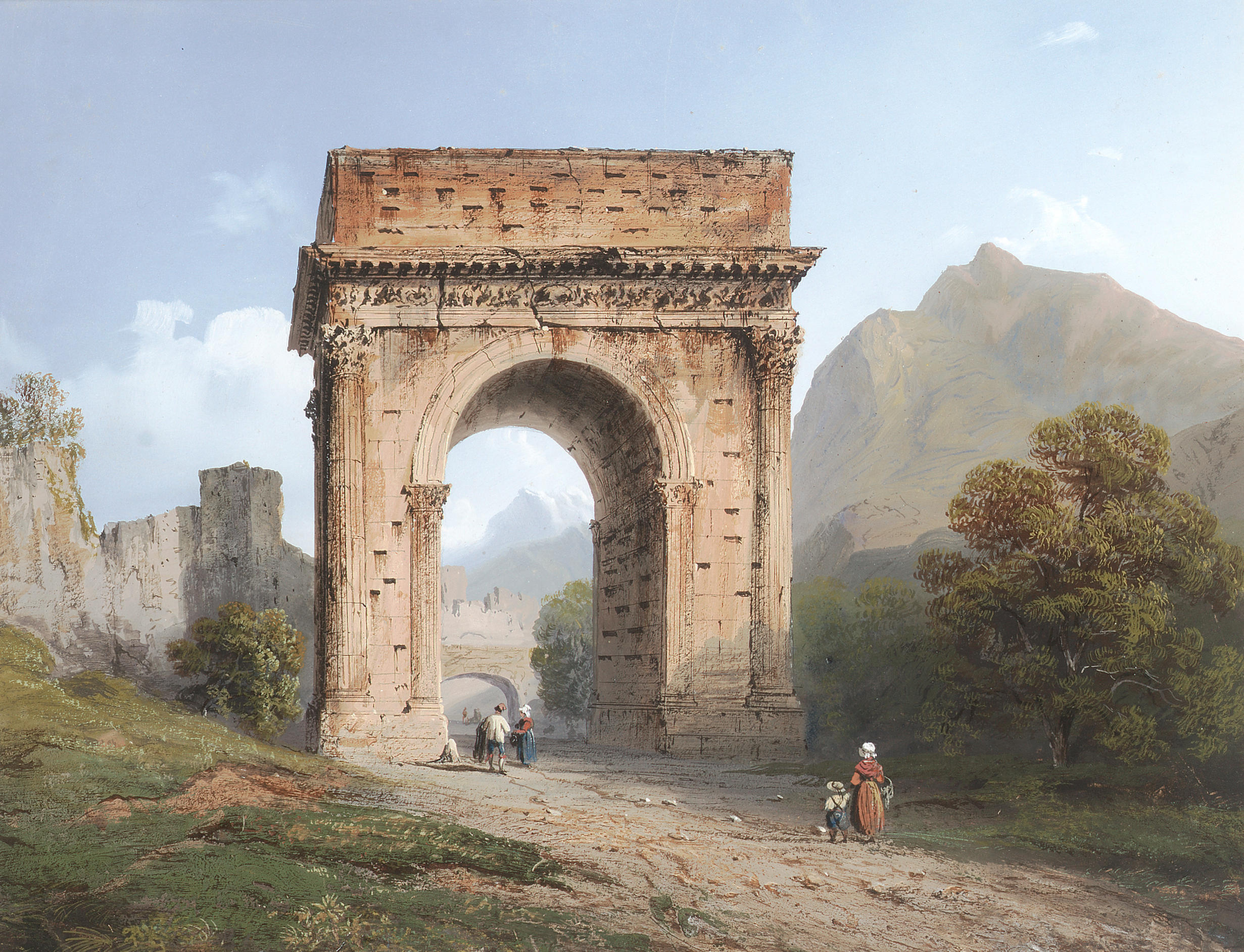
The Arch of Augustus, Susa, Italy

The Amidei descended from the family of Cottius, who, according to Roman tradition, descended from the gens Julia family of Rome of which Julius Caesar was part of. Marcus Julius Cottius, King in the Cottian Alps, himself adopted the name Julius in his surname around 13 BC, and had his alliance with the Roman Emperor Caesar Augustus, the grand-nephew of Julius Caesar, recorded on the Arch of Augustus in Susa, Piedmont, during the first century BC. The story linking the Cottius family and the gens Julia appeared in the Chrysis comedia written by the Pope Enea Silvio Piccolomini, during the 15th century, where he attests of his prestigious ancestry, as both families originated from Alba Longa. In that story, he relates to Aeneas Silvius and Ascanius, who were the mythical ancestors of the Kings of Alba Longa, to which, according to Greek historian Dionysius of Halicarnassus, the gens Julia family claimed descent. The Amidei were related to the House of Piccolomini by a certain Giulius Piccolomini Amidei, and as soon as they knew that their relatives descended from the gens Julia, they decided to name one of them Enea Silvio Piccolomini (in reference to Aeneas Silvius). He later became Pope Pius II and a supporter of Vlad Dracula against Sultan Mehmed of the Ottoman Empire, while his nephew, for his part, became Pope Pius III, succeeding Pope Alexander VI of the House of Borgia, as the new Head of the Catholic Church and ruler of the Papal States.

== Saint Amadeus ==
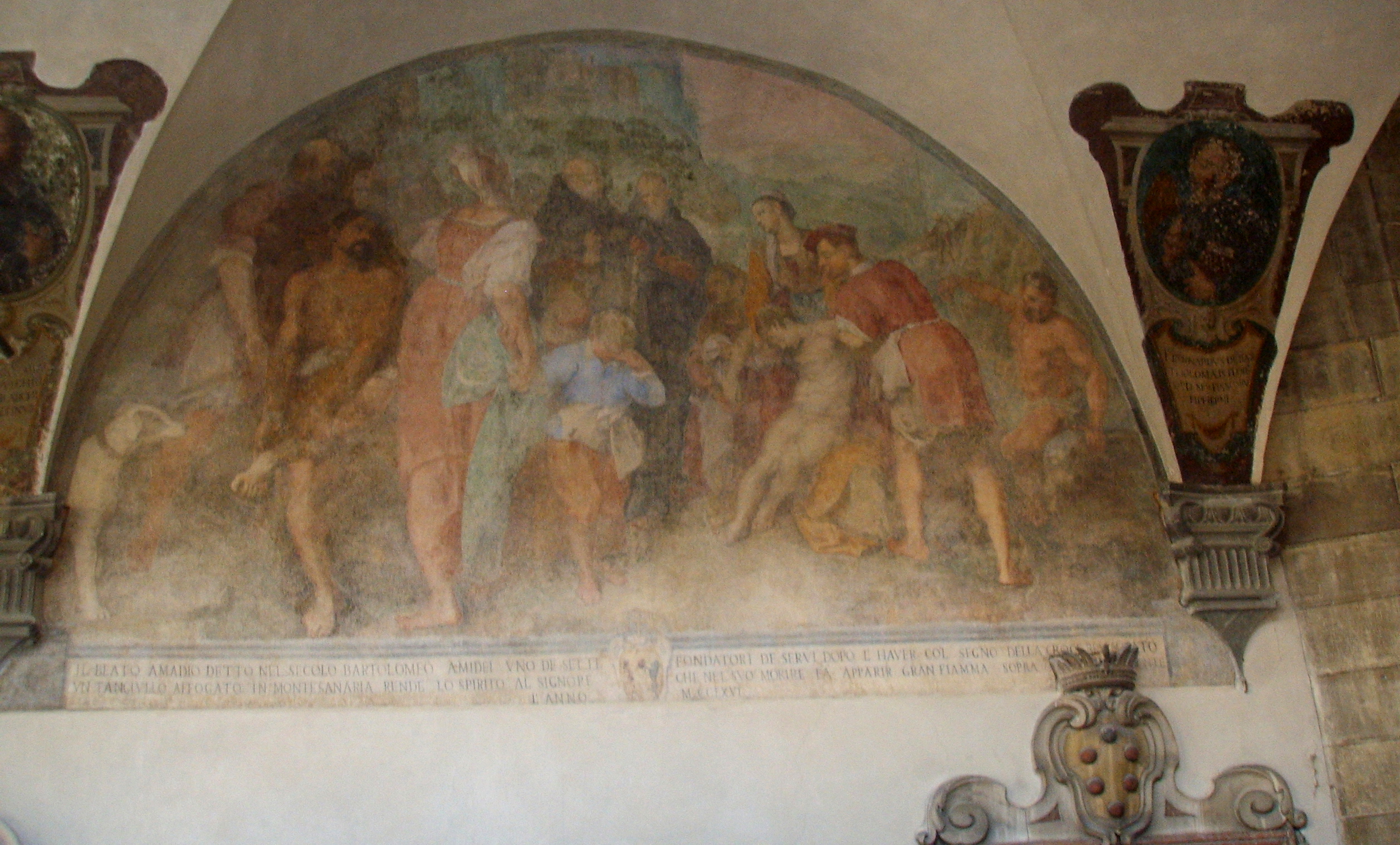
Fresco in the Church of the Santissima Annunziata, in which Amadio resuscitates a drowned boy, painted by Bernardino Poccetti.

One of the Amidei was called Bartholomeus Amadeus of the Amidei (Santo Amadio) and was one of the seven saint founders of a religious congregation, that spread worldwide, especially in Germany, the Servites. He moved from Florence to Mount Senarius (18 km away from the city), with his six friends, in order to be left alone and to concentrate on his devotion to God. He died on 12 February 1266, and according to the legend, the other Father Founders saw a flame rising to the sky as a symbol of his love for God. In 1888 he, along with the six saints, was sanctified by Pope Leo XIII.

== Coat of arms ==
Their coat of arms consists in a gold shield with three red stripes on it. The stripes started with the red one and then alternated with the gold stripes. After some years there was a slight modification; the shield started with the gold stripe and then always alternated with the red stripes.

== Castle ==
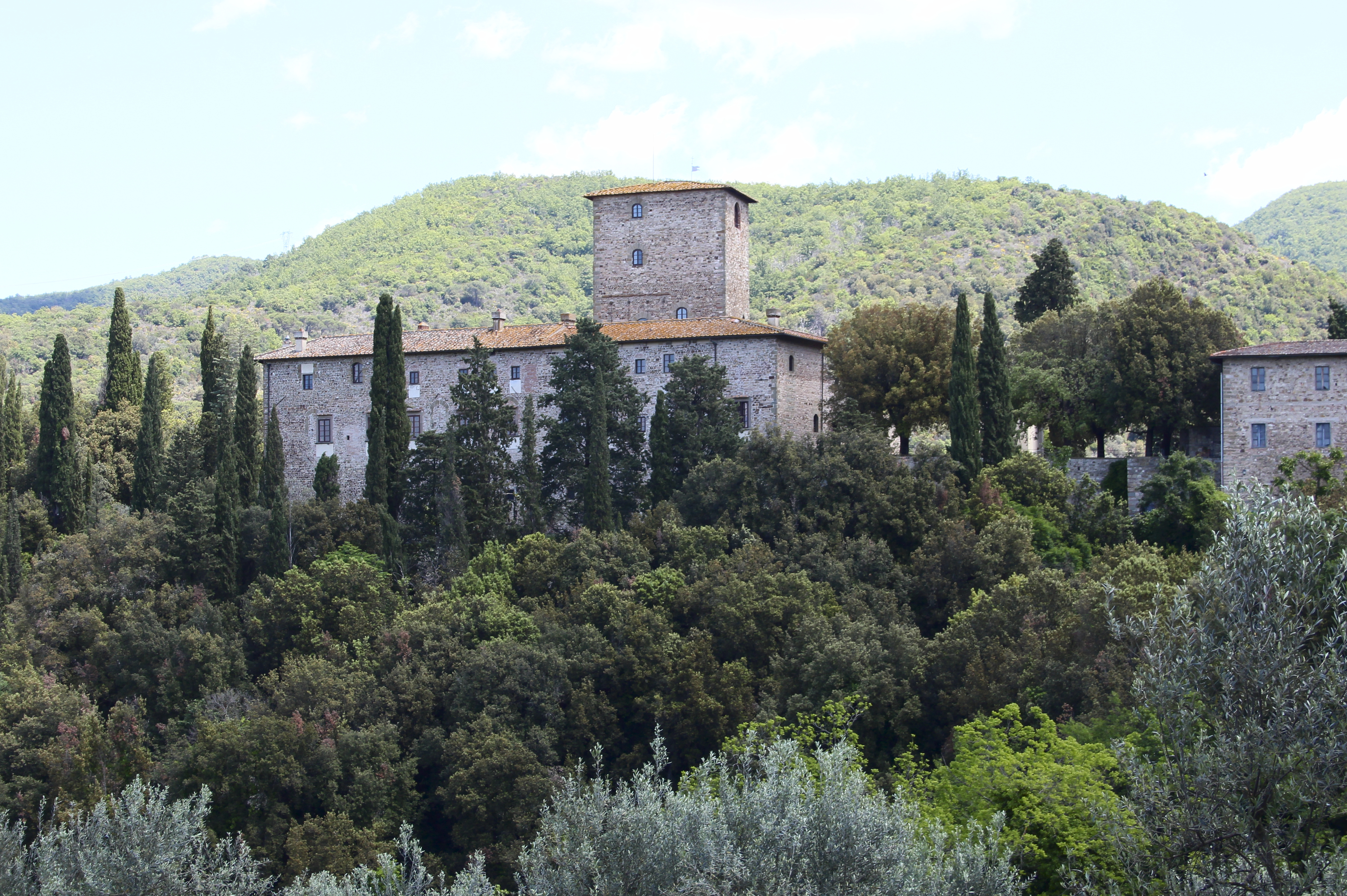
Castello di Mugnana, in the Chianti region

One the early castles of the Amidei was Castello di Mugnan in the region of Greve in Chianti. The castle originally featured a tower that was sixty meters tall but was later reduced for a lack of military purpose. The remainings of that tower can be seen today on the grounds of the Villa la Bugia near Florence. During the 14th century, the Amidei sold the castle to the House of Bardi, a noble family of bankers. The Bardis were famous for having financed Christopher Columbus and his expeditions to the Americas, as well as for having one of their daughters, Contessina de' Bardi, married to Cosimo de' Medici, the original founder of the Medici Bank. Thereafter, the castle was sold to the House of Strozzi, the richest family in Florence, until the Medicis forced them to exile.

== Sources ==
- Roberta Mucciarelli - L'archivio Piccolomini:Alle origini di una famiglia magnatizia: discendenza fantastiche e architetture nobilitanti, (edito in “Bullettino Senese di Storia Patria”, CIV, 1997, pp. 357–376)
- Roberta Mucciarelli - Piccolomini a Siena. XIII-XIV secolo. Ritratti possibili. 2005, 552 p. Pacini Editore (collana Dentro il Medioevo), libro leggibile et scaricabile online, sul sito Academia.edu.
- Giovanni Villani, Nuova Cronica, ed. G. Porta. 6.38.
- Dante, Inferno, XXVIII.
- Pseudo-Latini, "Cronica", ed. O. von Hartwig in Altesten (Halle, 1880).
- Dino Compagni, Cronica, ed. I. del Lungo (Citta di Castello, 1913).
- Gordon, N.P.J. (2006). "The murder of Buondelmonte". Renaissance Studies. 20 (4). doi:10.1111/j.1477-4658.2006.00201.x. S2CID 191258511.
