= Portrait of Cosimo the Elder =

Painting by Pontormo

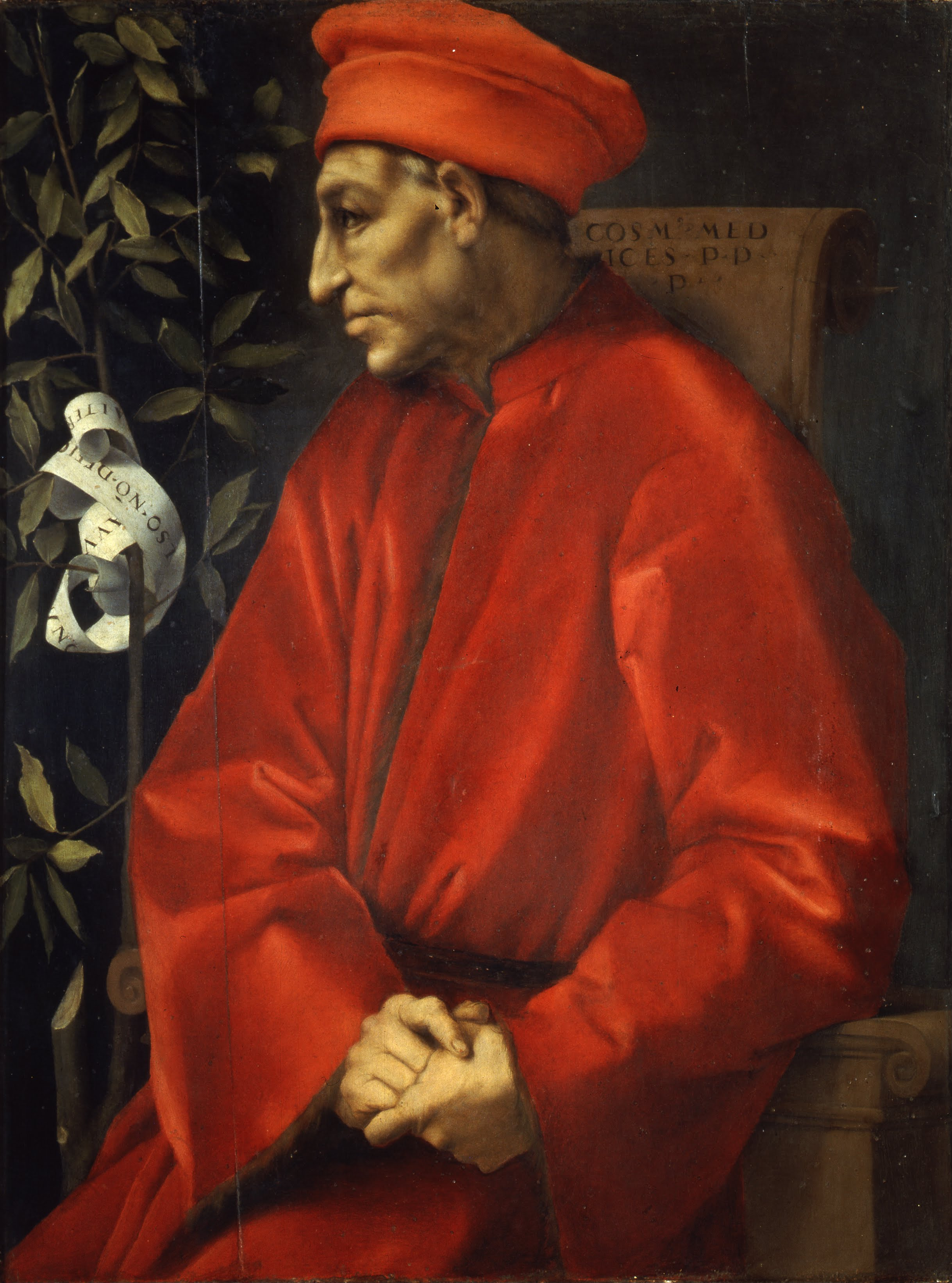
Portrait of Cosimo the Elder by Pontormo

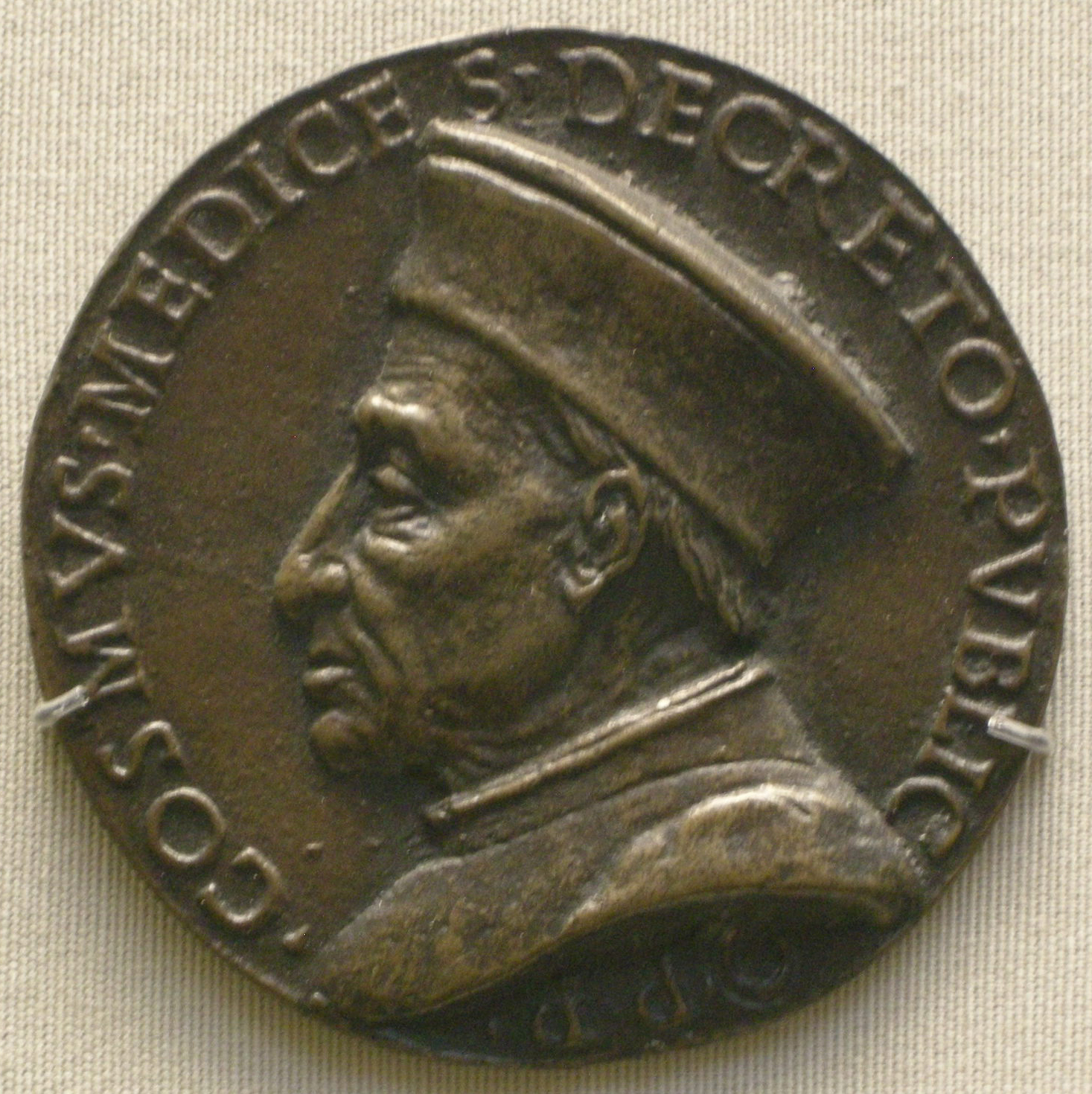
Florentine artist, Bronze medal of Cosimo the Elder, c. 1465–1469

Portrait of Cosimo the Elder is an oil on panel painting by Pontormo, executed c. 1519–1520, now in the Uffizi, Florence.

Its subject Cosimo the Elder, founder of the House of Medici, had died over fifty years earlier. The work was commissioned by Goro Gheri, who from September 1519 onwards was responsible for the extraordinary administration of Florence, possibly at the instigation of Giovanni de' Medici, later to become pope Leo X. He had begun his career as secretary to Lorenzo, Duke of Urbino, killed the previous May, thus extinguishing the "di Cafaggiolo" line, the main Medici line. Their fortunes revived that June when a new male heir was born to Giovanni delle Bande Nere (member of the "popolano" branch) and Maria Salviati (daughter of Lucrezia, the future pope's sister) – this heir would be named Cosimo after the dynasty's founder.

This work was Pontormo's entry ticket into Medici circles – it was in Ottaviano de' Medici's collection before passing to that of his son Alessandro – Ottaviano even commissioned him soon afterwards to paint some of the frescoes of the 'salone' at the villa di Poggio a Caiano. The work was copied in 1585 by Alessandro Pieroni for the Serie gioviana and Bronzino also produced a copy of just the face for a gallery of Medici portraits now in the Vasari Corridor.

== Links ==
- Uffizi
