= Vasari Corridor =

16th-century elevated enclosed passageway in Florence, Italy

Coordinates: 43°46′5.53″N 11°15′14.57″E

- Corridoio Vasariano (Italian)
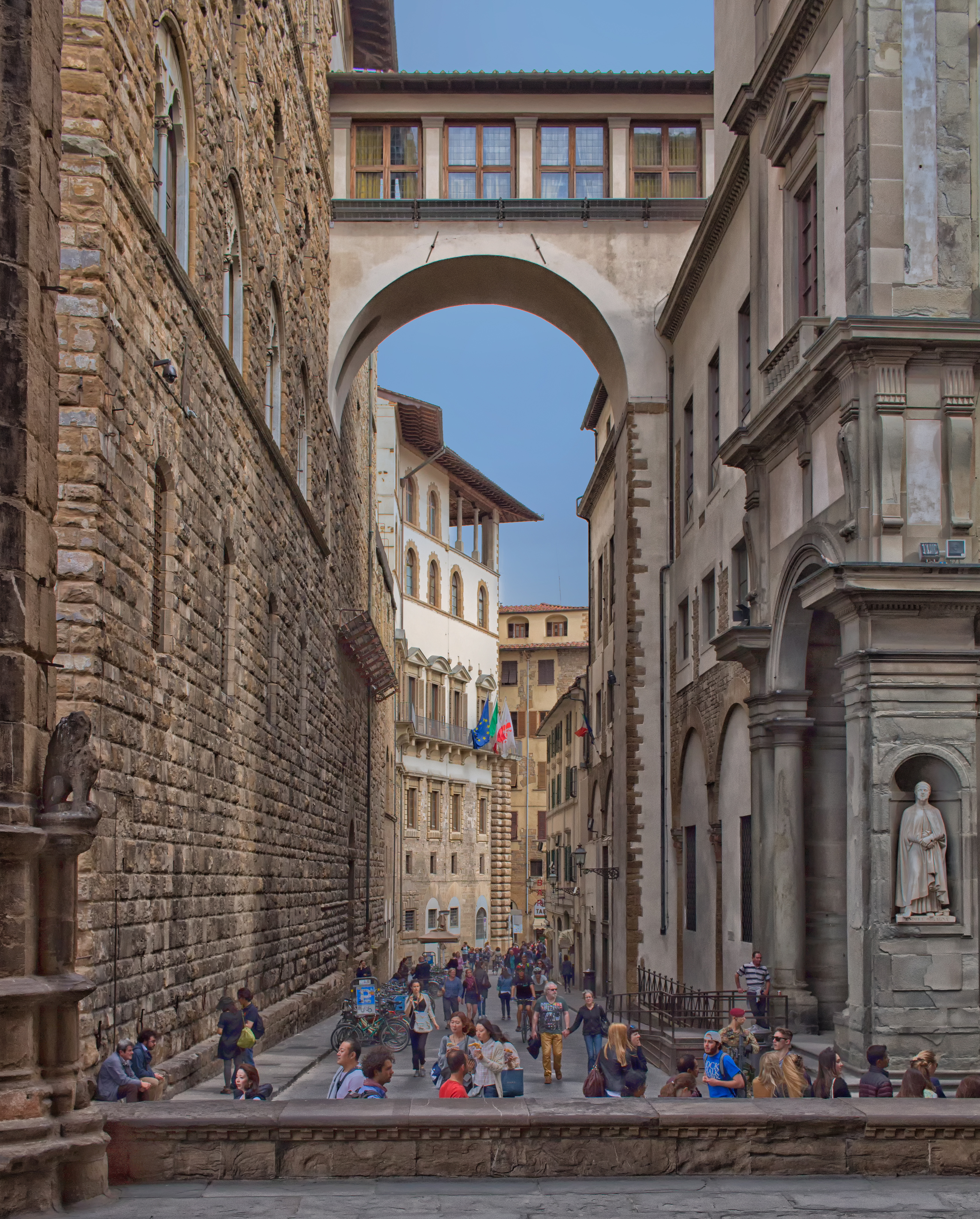
- The Vasari Corridor's bridge from the Palazzo Vecchio to Uffizi
- Interactive map of the Vasari Corridor area

General information
- Location: Florence, Italy
- Current tenants: Uffizi Gallery
- Year built: 1565

Design and construction
- Architect: Giorgio Vasari

The Vasari Corridor (Italian: Corridoio Vasariano) is a 16th-century elevated enclosed passageway in Florence, connecting the Palazzo Vecchio with the Palazzo Pitti. It was designed by, and named for, architect Giorgio Vasari to allow Duke Cosimo I de' Medici to move undisturbed between both palaces.

Beginning on the south side of the Palazzo Vecchio, the corridor joins the Uffizi Gallery and leaves on its south side, crossing the Lungarno degli Archibusieri, then follows the north bank of the river Arno until it crosses the river at Ponte Vecchio. The corridor winds around the Torre dei Mannelli using brackets, and conceals part of the façade of the Church of Santa Felicità. It then snakes its way over rows of houses in the Oltrarno district, becoming narrower, to finally join the Palazzo Pitti on its eastern side, in view of the Boboli Gardens. The corridor's full length is approximately one kilometer.

== History ==
In 1564, Duke Cosimo I de' Medici commissioned Giorgio Vasari—a renowned Florentine architect, painter, and art historian—to build the passageway later named for him. The works were to be completed in five months, in order to commemorate the marriage of Cosimo's son, Francesco, to Johanna of Austria, in 1565. The idea of an enclosed passageway was motivated by the Grand Duke's desire to move freely between his residence and the government palace, when, like most monarchs of the period, he felt insecure in public. After Alessandro de' Medici had abruptly transformed the Republic of Florence into a Medici hereditary monarchy in 1533, provoking bitter resentment among Florentine citizens and perhaps contributing to his assassination, Cosimo governed cautiously in an unstable political climate.

The corridor's most notable architectural precedent is the Passetto di Borgo in Rome, an elevated passageway linking the Vatican City with the Castel Sant'Angelo. Originally commissioned by Pope Nicholas III in 1277, the Passetto served as an escape route in times of political danger: Pope Alexander VI used it in 1494 to protect himself during the invasion of Charles VIII, and the Medici Pope Clement VII fled through it during the Sack of Rome in 1527. Vasari, who had extensive experience of Roman architecture through his numerous papal commissions, adapted the concept of the open elevated passetto into an enclosed and private walkway for his Medici patron.

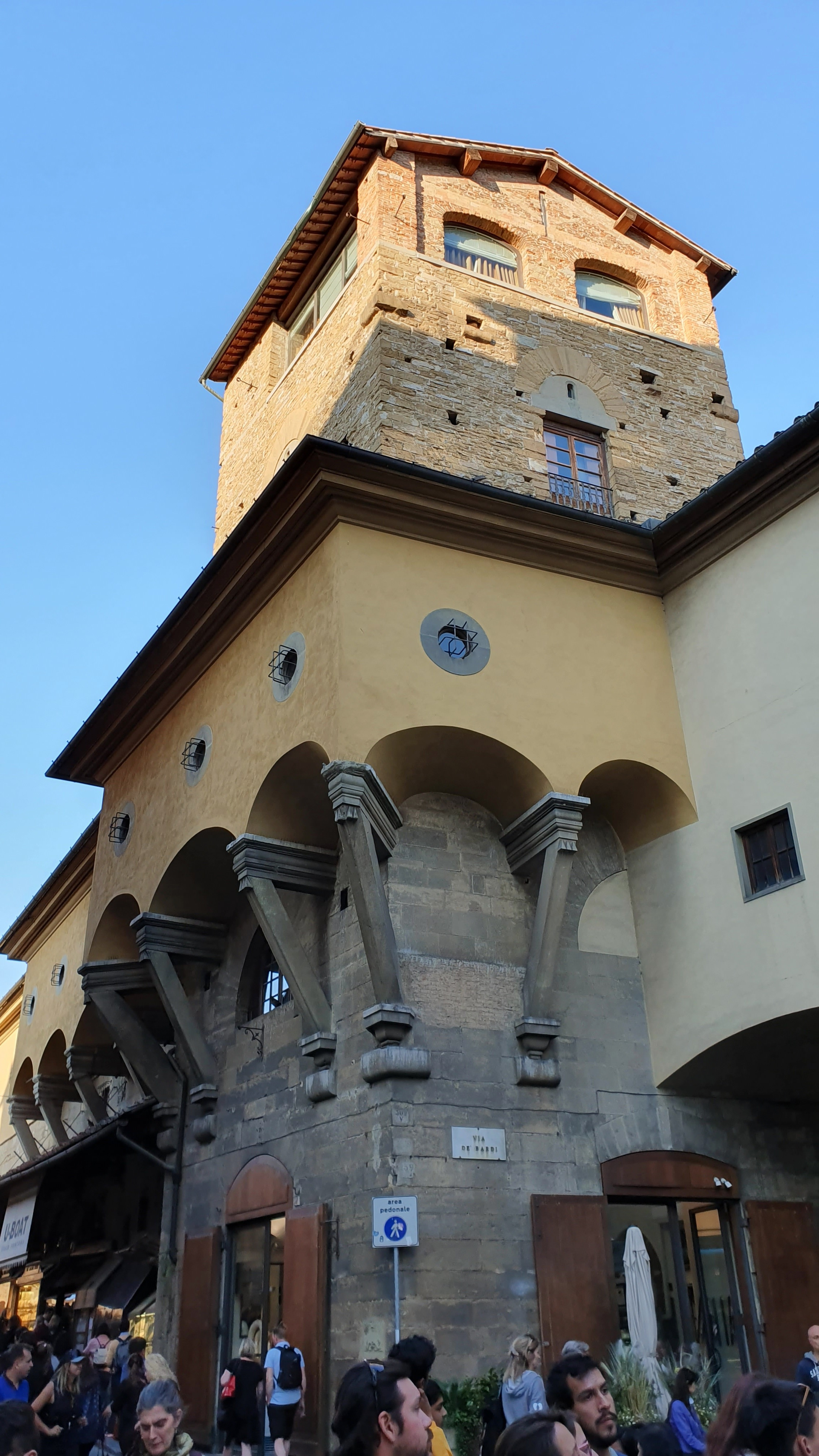
The Corridor as it winds around Torre dei Mannelli

The meat market of Ponte Vecchio was moved to avoid its smell reaching into the passage. Its place was taken by goldsmith shops, which were established by 1593 and still occupy the bridge today. In the middle of Ponte Vecchio, the corridor is characterised by a series of panoramic windows facing the Arno, in the direction of the Ponte Santa Trinita. Vasari also pierced other sections of the corridor with decorative windows to provide views of the river and the surrounding city.

After the Ponte Vecchio, the corridor was forced to pass around the Mannelli Tower, after the family who owned it staunchly opposed its demolition; the corridor was subsequently attached to the tower's western side with stone brackets. The corridor passes over the loggiato of the church of Santa Felicita; at that point it had a balcony, protected by a thick railing, looking into the interior of the church, to allow the Grand Duke's family to follow services without mixing with the populace.

== Self-portrait collection ==
In the middle of the seventeenth century, Cardinal Leopoldo de' Medici transformed the Corridoio Vasariano into a gallery of famous artists' self-portraits. The collection grew to hundreds of paintings, including works by Leonardo da Vinci, Andrea del Sarto, Michelangelo, Sofonisba Anguissola, Domenico Beccafumi, and Gian Lorenzo Bernini. The idea of displaying a collection of artists' self-portraits reflected a broader Medici and Florentine investment in the cultural status of artists, which Vasari himself had championed through his book Lives of the Most Excellent Painters, Sculptors, and Architects and through his role in founding the Accademia del Disegno.

== Damage and restoration ==
The Vasari Corridor has suffered significant damage on several occasions since its construction. During the Second World War, the corridor was damaged in the 1943 bombing of Florence. It was subsequently further affected by the catastrophic 1966 flood of the Arno, which required extensive restoration. In 1974, the restored Corridoio Vasariano officially opened to the public, allowing visitors to view the self-portrait collection and other paintings for the first time.

The area closest to the Uffizi entrance was heavily damaged by the Via dei Georgofili bombing commissioned by the Sicilian Mafia on the night of 27 May 1993. A car bomb was detonated next to the Torre dei Pulci, between Via Lambertesca and Via dei Georgofili, as a result of which five people died. This section of the Uffizi Gallery was among the buildings damaged, and several artworks were irreparably damaged; these have been pieced back together and returned to their original positions to serve as a reminder of the event. After a five-year renovation costing approximately $15 million, the Uffizi and the Corridor reopened in 1998, with 100 additional works placed on display.

In 2016 the corridor was closed for safety reasons, and was not re-opened to the public until December 2024.

In August 2023, graffiti was found spray-painted on seven pilasters of the corridor. Authorities accused two German tourists of being responsible, and the Italian Ministry of Culture said repairs would cost 10,000 euros ($10,811).

== Visiting the Corridor ==
The Vasari Corridor can be visited from Tuesday to Sunday with an additional charge on top of a Uffizi Gallery ticket. Once visitors have started to walk the Corridor, they cannot return to the Gallery. On days on which entrance to the Uffizi Gallery is free—generally the first Sunday of each month—entrance to the Corridor is also free, but must be pre-booked.

== Gallery ==
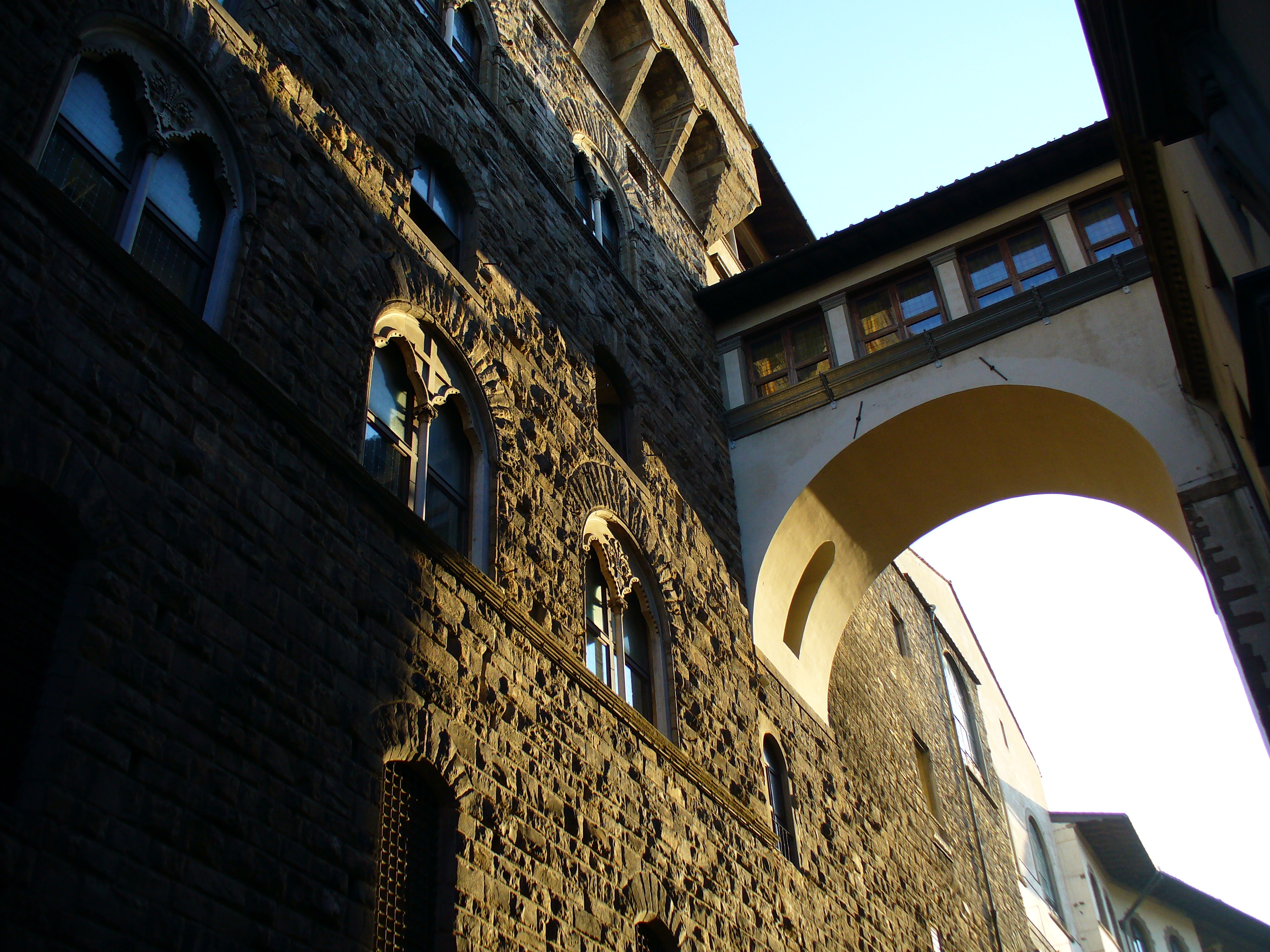
The bridge between the Palazzo Vecchio and the Uffizi

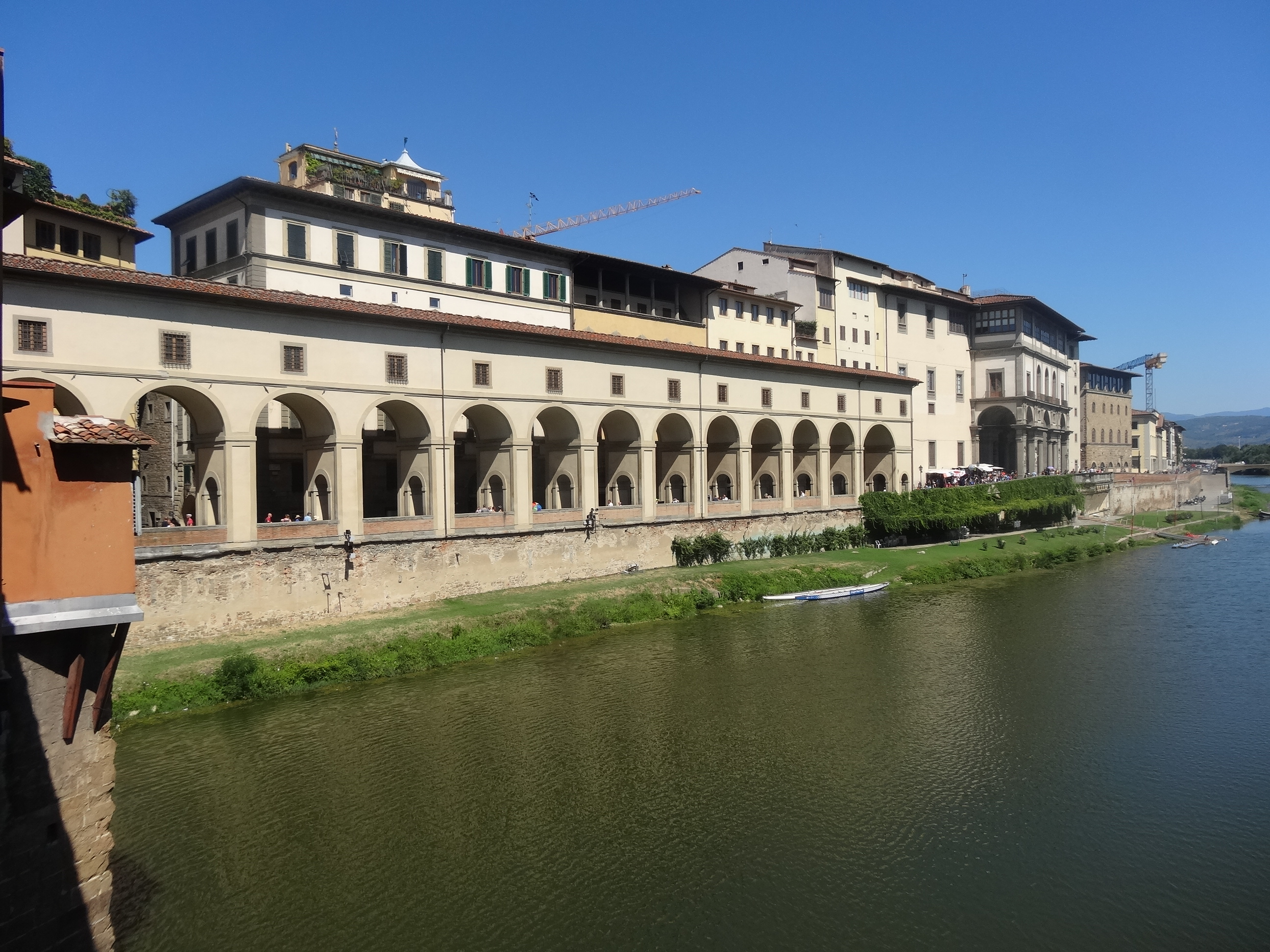
The Corridor between the Uffizi and the Ponte Vecchio

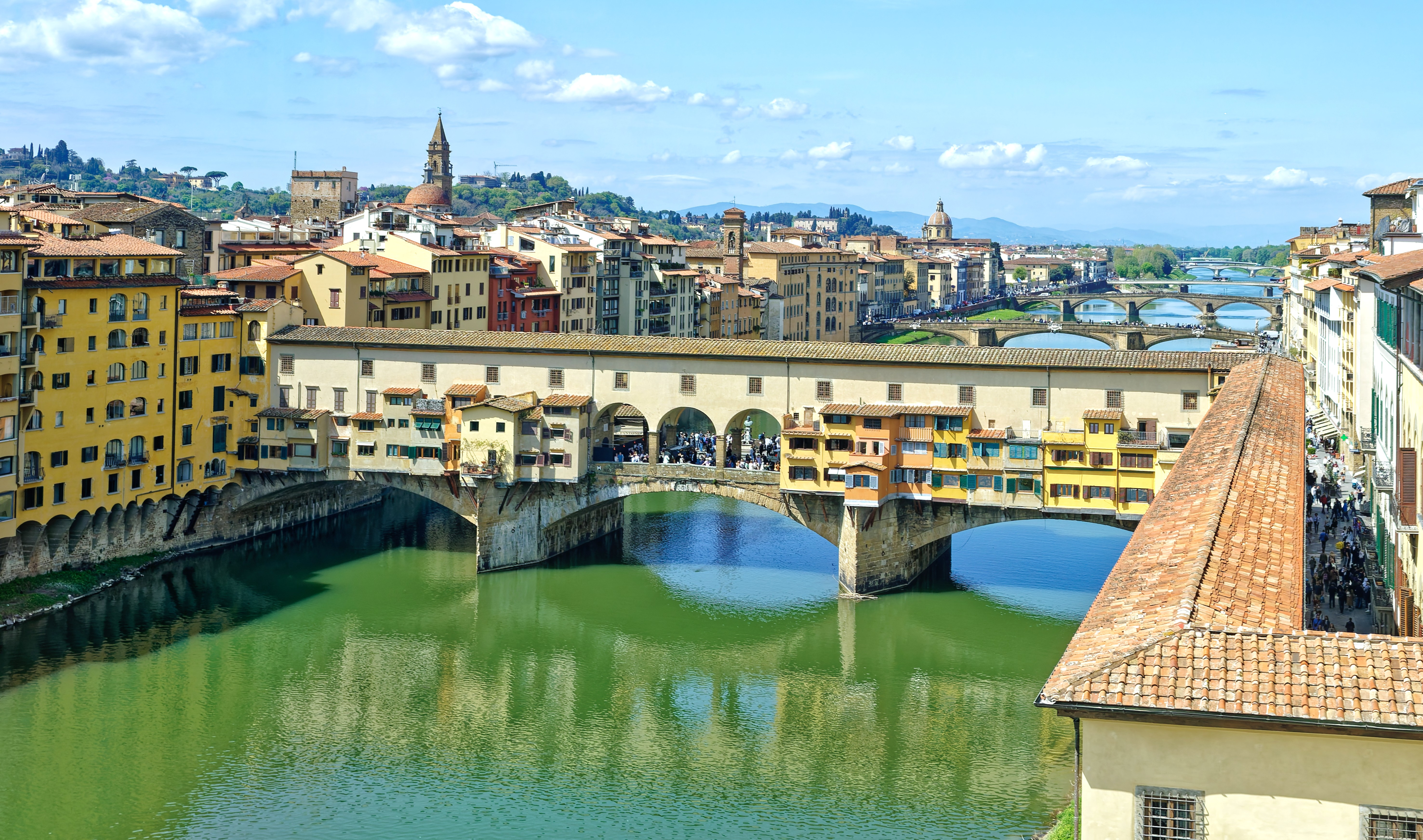
The Corridors's crossing of the Ponte Vecchio

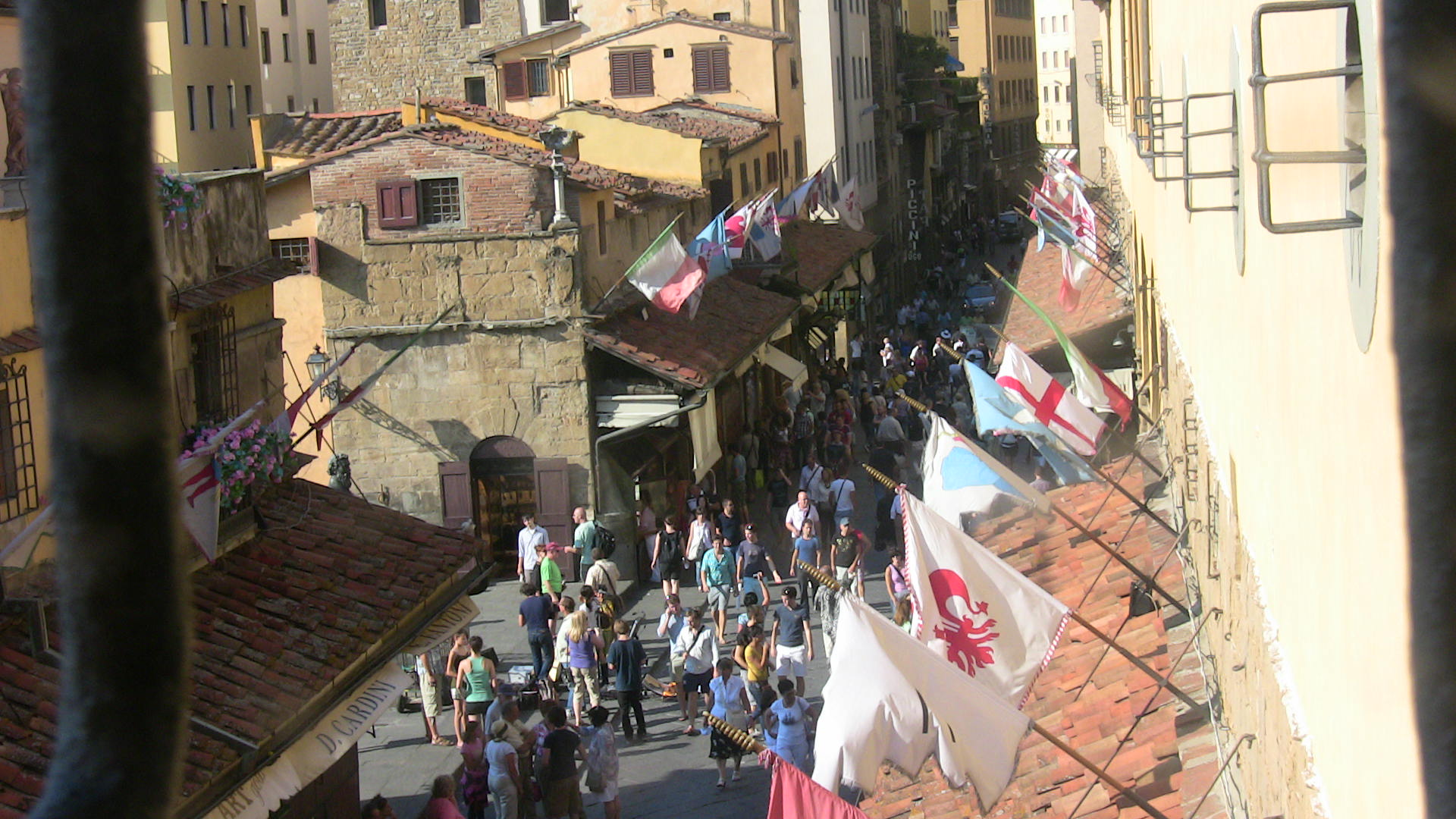
The Ponte Vecchio as seen from the Corridor

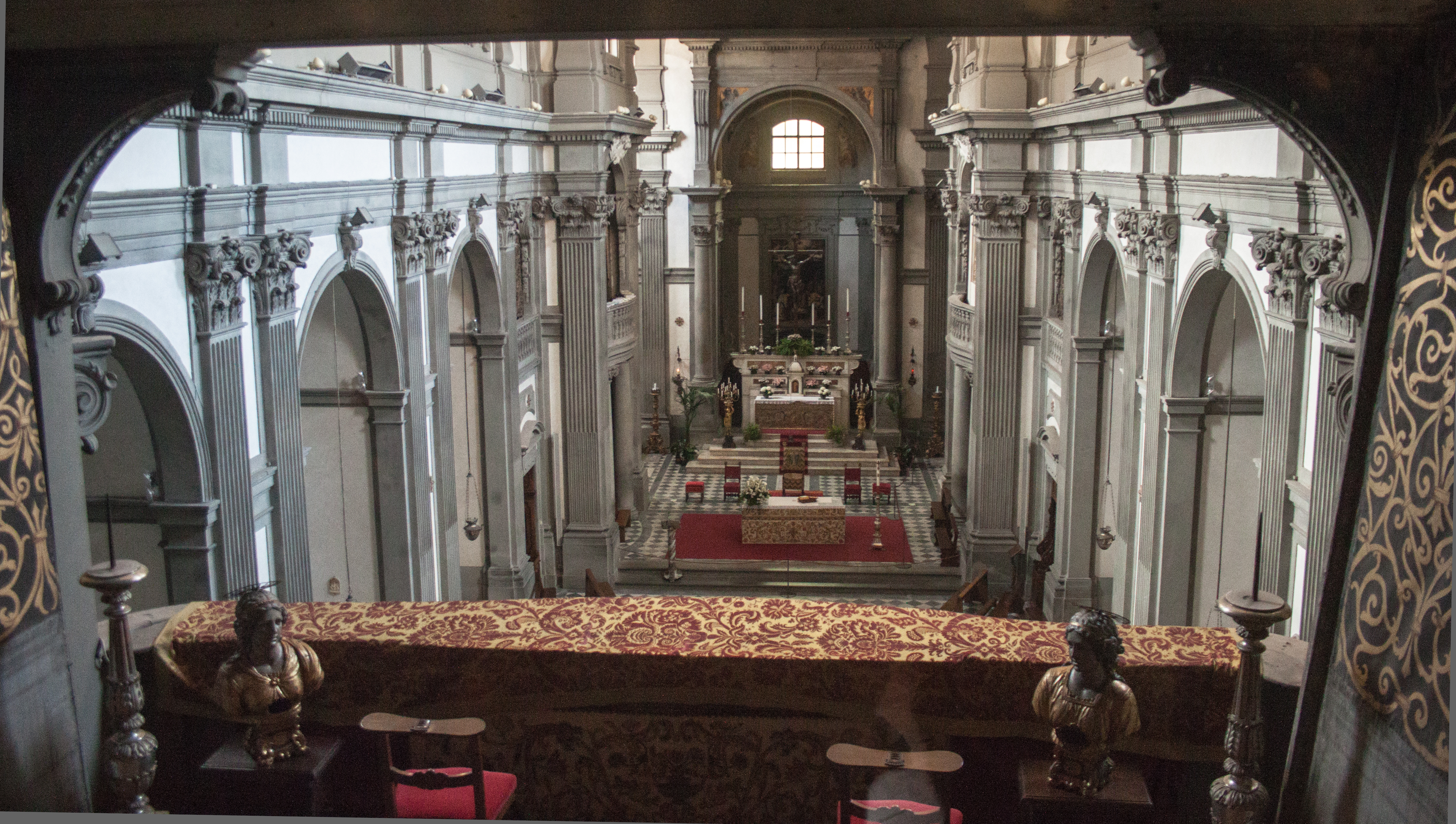
View from the Corridor into the Church of Santa Felicita

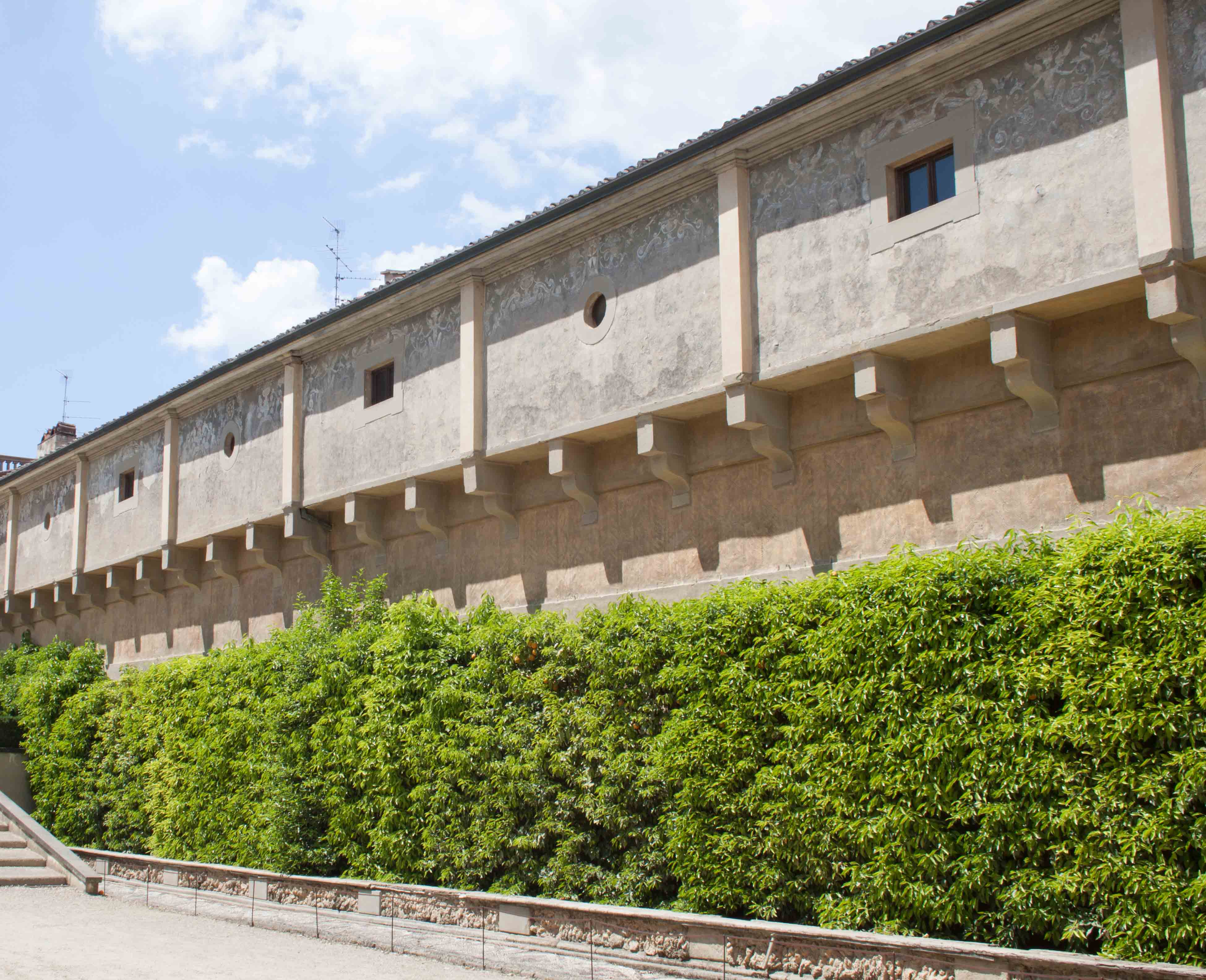
The Corridor's end point at the Palazzo Pitti

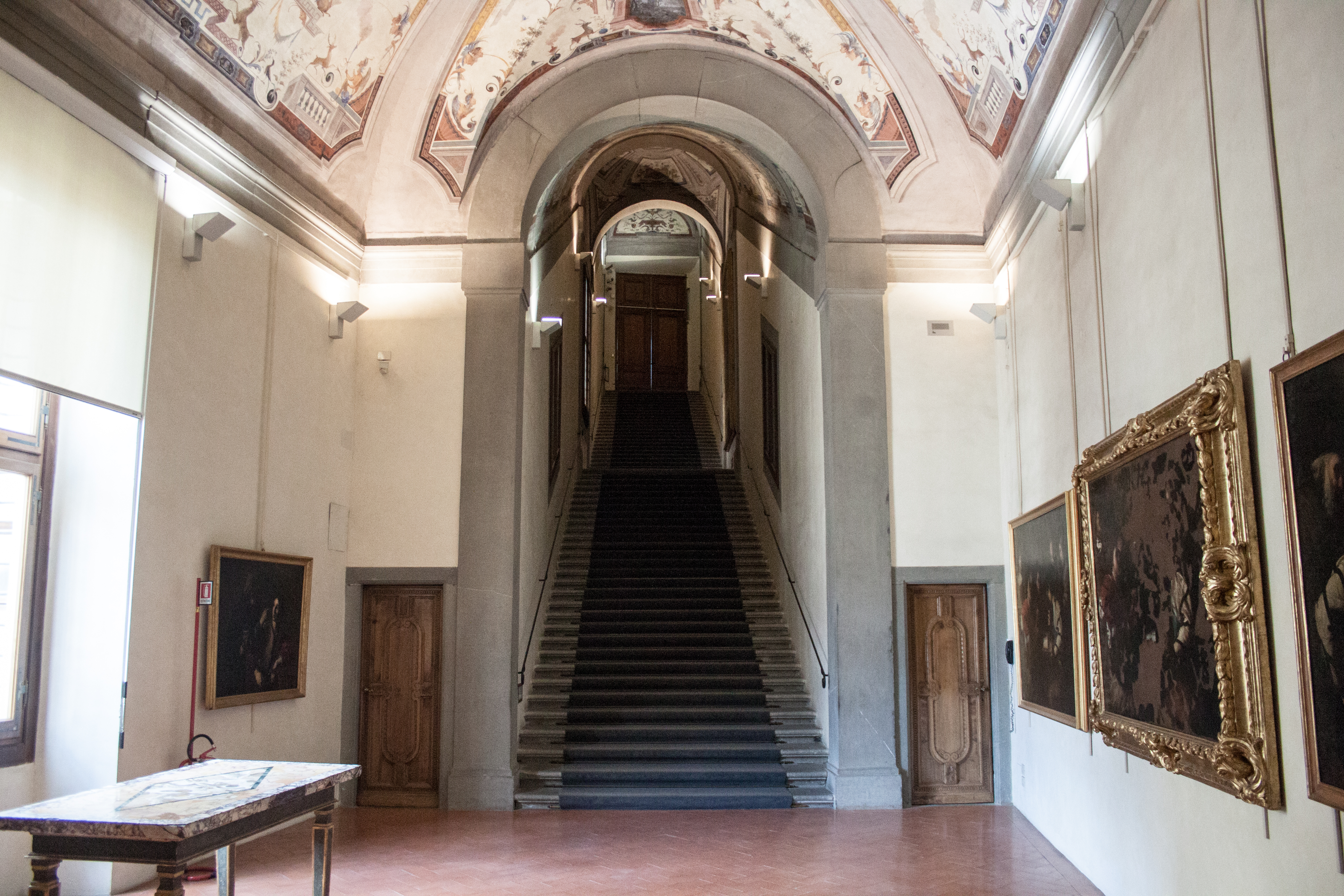
The entrance to the Corridor from the Uffizi

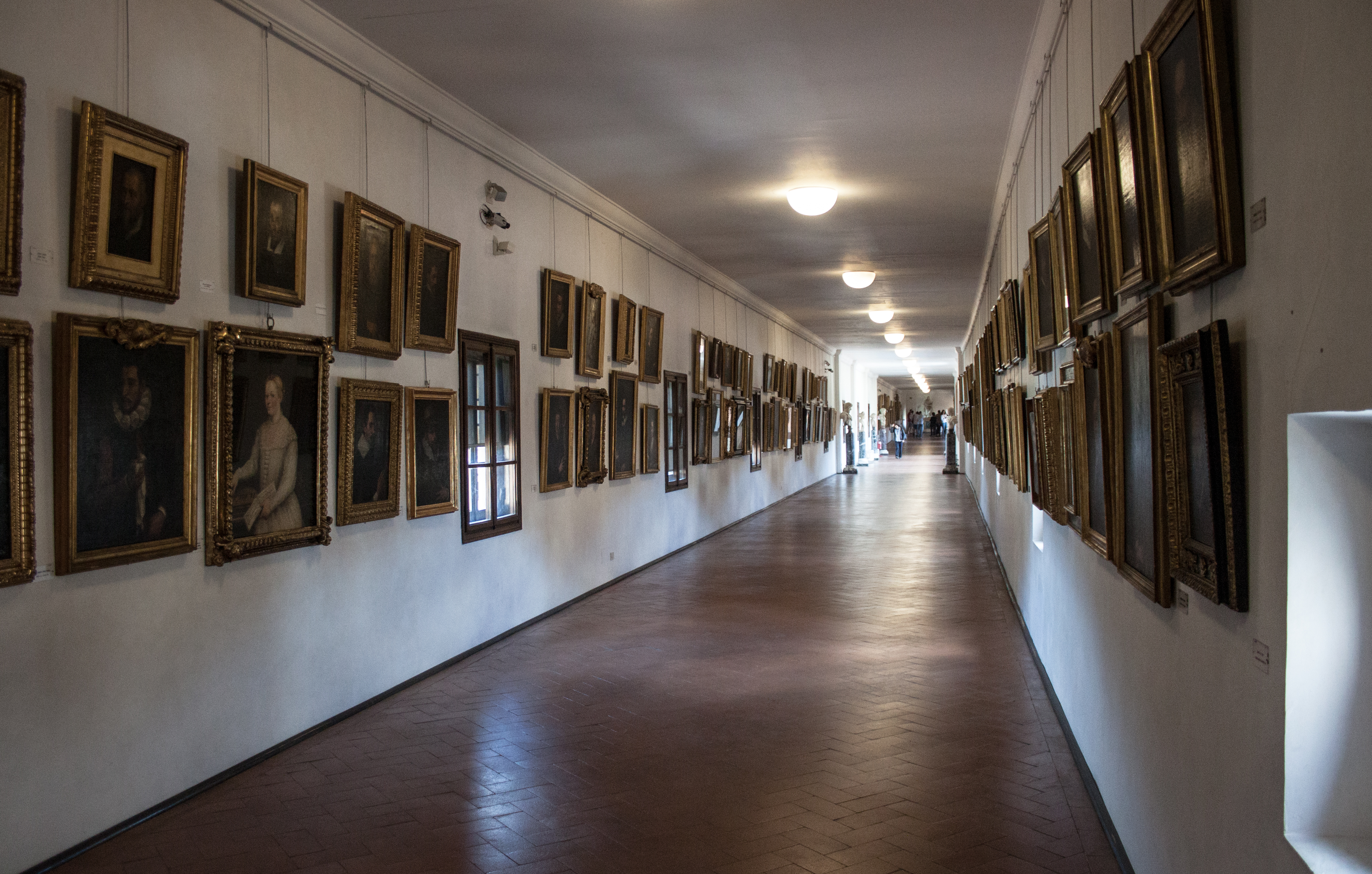
Inside view of the Corridor

== See also ==
- Passetto di Borgo, Rome
- Passages for Maria Maddalena de' Medici (incl. the corridoio mediceo), also in Florence
