= Ponte Vecchio =

Bridge in Florence, Italy

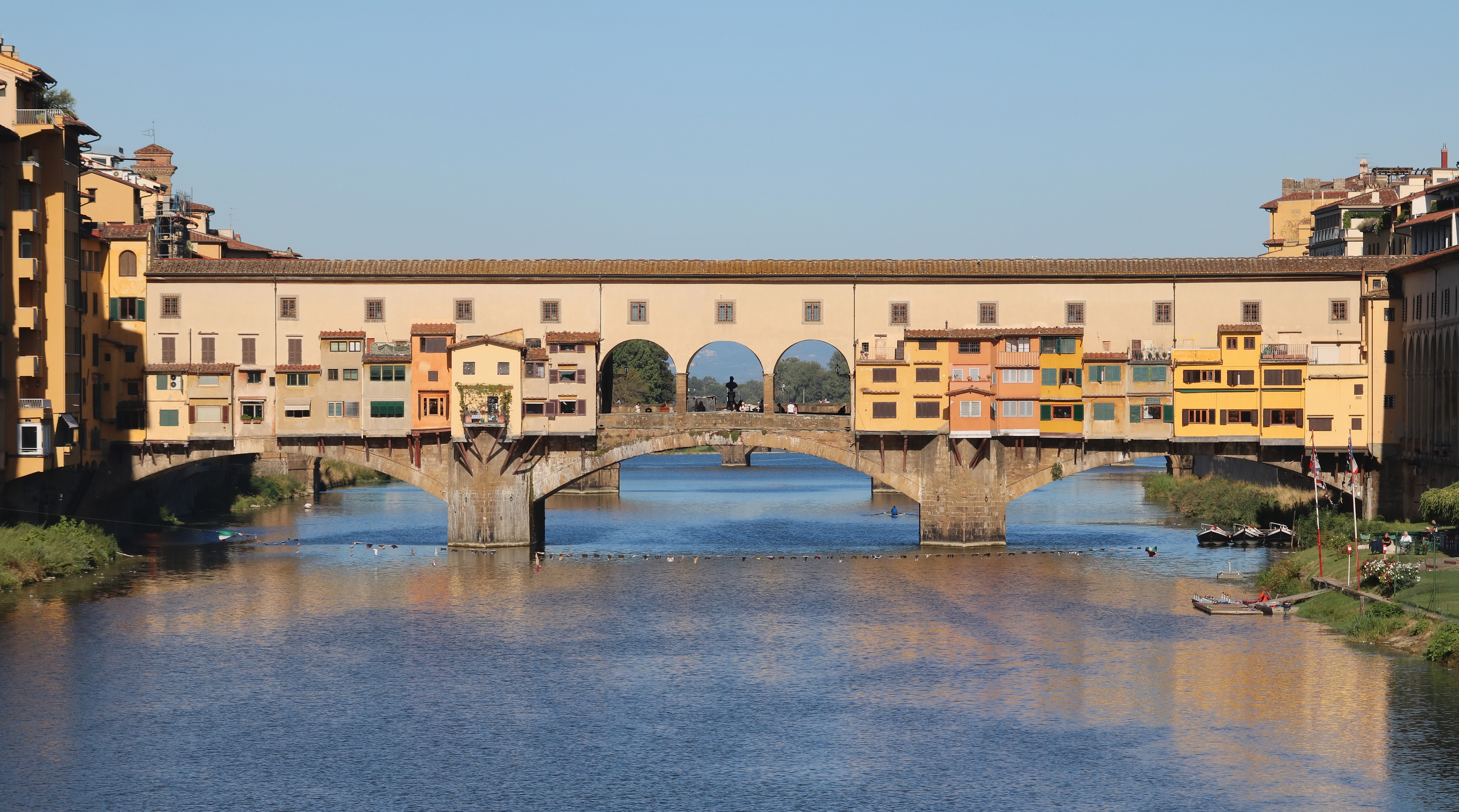
- Coordinates: 43°46′05″N 11°15′11″E
- Crosses: Arno
- Locale: Florence, Italy

Characteristics
- Design: Closed-spandrel segmental stone arch bridge
- Longest span: 30 metres (98 ft)

Location
- Interactive map of Ponte Vecchio

The Ponte Vecchio (Italian pronunciation: [ˈponte ˈvɛkkjo]; "Old Bridge") is a medieval stone closed-spandrel segmental arch bridge over the Arno, in Florence, Italy. The only bridge in Florence spared from destruction during World War II, it is noted for the shops built along it; building shops on such bridges was once a common practice. Butchers, tanners, and farmers initially occupied the shops; the present tenants are jewellers, art dealers, and souvenir sellers. The Ponte Vecchio's two neighbouring bridges are the Ponte Santa Trinita and the Ponte alle Grazie.

The bridge connects Via Por Santa Maria (Lungarno degli Acciaiuoli and Lungarno degli Archibusieri) to Via de' Guicciardini (Borgo San Jacopo and Via de' Bardi).

The name was given to what was the oldest Florentine bridge when the Ponte alla Carraia was built, then called Ponte Nuovo in contrast to the old one. Beyond the historical value, the bridge over time has played a central role in the city road system, starting from when it connected the Roman Florentia with the Via Cassia Nova commissioned by the emperor Hadrian in 123 AD.

In contemporary times, despite being closed to vehicular traffic, the bridge is crossed by a considerable pedestrian flow generated both by its fame and by the fact that it connects places of high tourist interest on the two banks of the river: Piazza del Duomo, Piazza della Signoria on one side with the area of Palazzo Pitti and Santo Spirito in the Oltrarno.

The bridge appears in the list drawn up in 1901 by the General Directorate of Antiquities and Fine Arts, as a monumental building to be considered having national artistic heritage.

== History and construction ==
The bridge spans the Arno at its narrowest point, where it is believed that a bridge was first built in Roman times, when the via Cassia crossed the river at this point. The Roman piers were of stone, the superstructure of wood. The bridge first appears in a document of 996 and was destroyed by a flood in 1117 and reconstructed in stone. In 1218 the Ponte alla Carraia, a wooden structure, was established nearby which led to it being referred to as "Ponte Nuovo" relative to the older (Vecchio) structure. It was swept away again in 1333 except for two of its central piers, as noted by Giovanni Villani in his Nuova Cronica. It was rebuilt in 1345.

This location marks one of the earliest crossings of the Arno in Florence, possibly originating from Roman times or even before. Although floods have repeatedly damaged it, the current bridge has stood since approximately 1339-1345. For many years, the only older bridge in the city was the Rubaconte bridge, built nearly a century earlier. But after significant 19th-century modifications to that structure and its destruction in 1944, the Ponte Vecchio claimed its title as the oldest bridge in Florence.

Giorgio Vasari recorded the traditional view of his day that attributed its design to Taddeo Gaddi— besides Giotto one of the few artistic names of the trecento still recalled two hundred years later. Modern historians present Neri di Fioravanti as a possible candidate as the builder.

Sheltered in a little loggia at the central opening of the bridge is a weathered dedication stone, which once read Nel trentatrè dopo il mille-trecento, il ponte cadde, per diluvio dell' acque: poi dieci anni, come al Comun piacque, rifatto fu con questo adornamento. The Torre dei Mannelli was built at the southeast corner of the bridge to defend it.

The bridge consists of three segmental arches: the main arch has a span of 30 meters (98 feet), and the two side arches each span 27 meters (89 feet). The rise of the arches is between 3.5 and 4.4 metres (11½ to 14½ feet), and the span-to-rise ratio is 5:1. The shallow segmental arches, which require fewer piers than the semicircular arch traditionally used by Romans, enabled ease of access and navigation for animal-drawn carts. Another notable design element is the large piazza at the center of the bridge that Leon Battista Alberti described as a prominent ornament in the city.

A stone with an inscription from Dante (Paradiso xvi. 140-7) records the spot at the entrance to the bridge where Buondelmonte de' Buondelmonti was murdered by the Amidei clan in 1215, which began the urban fighting of the Guelfs and Ghibellines.

The bridge has always hosted shops and merchants who displayed their goods on tables before their premises, after authorization by the Bargello (a sort of a lord mayor, a magistrate and a police authority).

== Later additions and changes ==
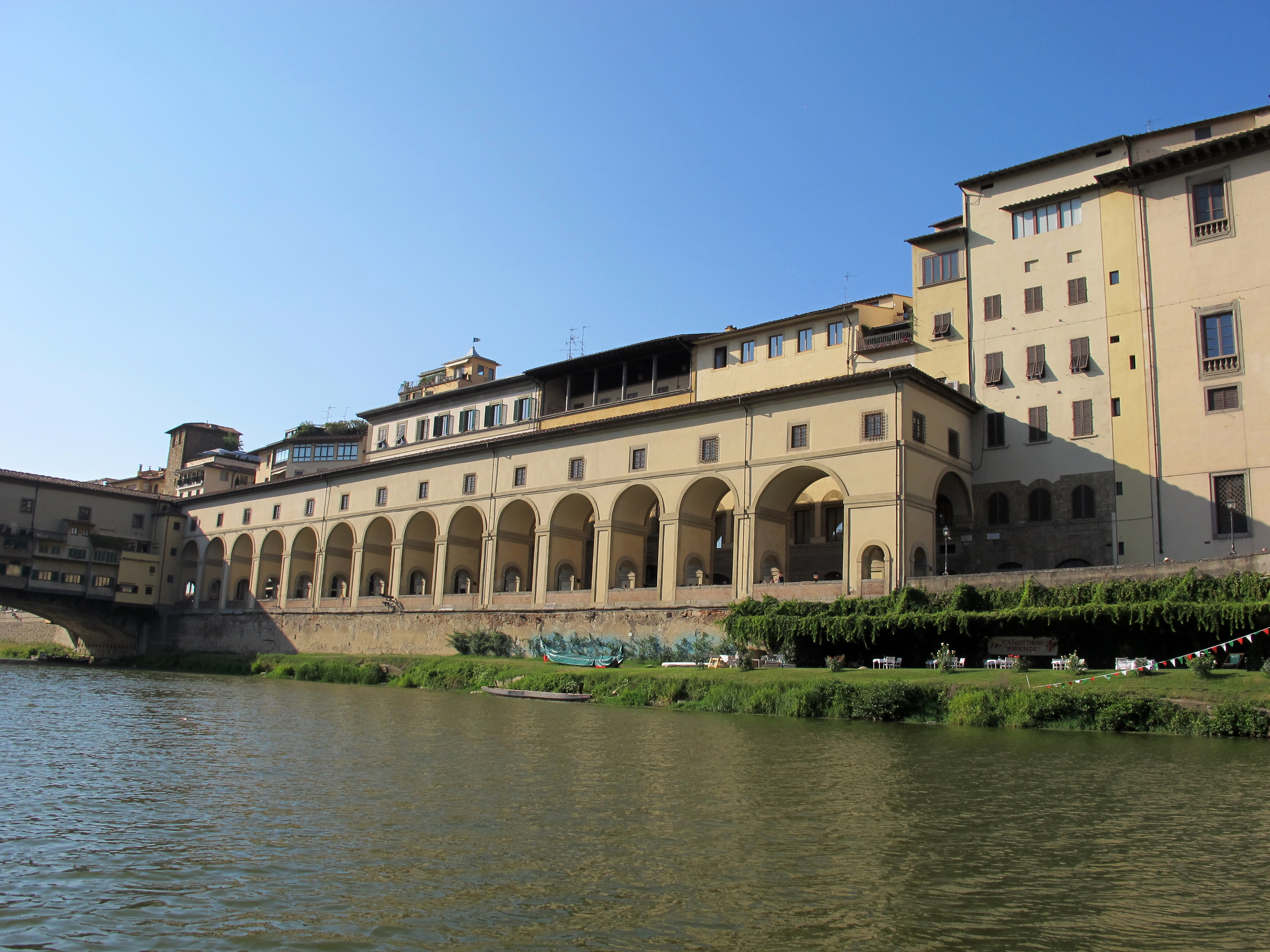
Vasari Corridor from Palazzo Vecchio to Palazzo Pitti

In order to connect the Palazzo Vecchio (Florence's town hall) with the Palazzo Pitti, in 1565 Cosimo I de' Medici had Giorgio Vasari build the Vasari Corridor, part of which runs above the Ponte Vecchio.

To enhance the prestige and clean up the bridge, a decree was made in 1565 that excluded butchers from this bridge (only goldsmiths and jewellers are allowed) that is in effect to this day. The association of butchers had monopolized the shops on the bridge since 1442.

The back shops (retrobotteghe) that may be seen from upriver were added in the seventeenth century.

== 20th century ==
In 1900, to honour and mark the fourth century of the birth of the great Florentine sculptor and master goldsmith Benvenuto Cellini, the leading goldsmiths of the bridge commissioned the Florentine sculptor, Raffaello Romanelli, to create a bronze bust of Cellini to stand atop a fountain in the middle of the Eastern side of the bridge, where it stands to this day.

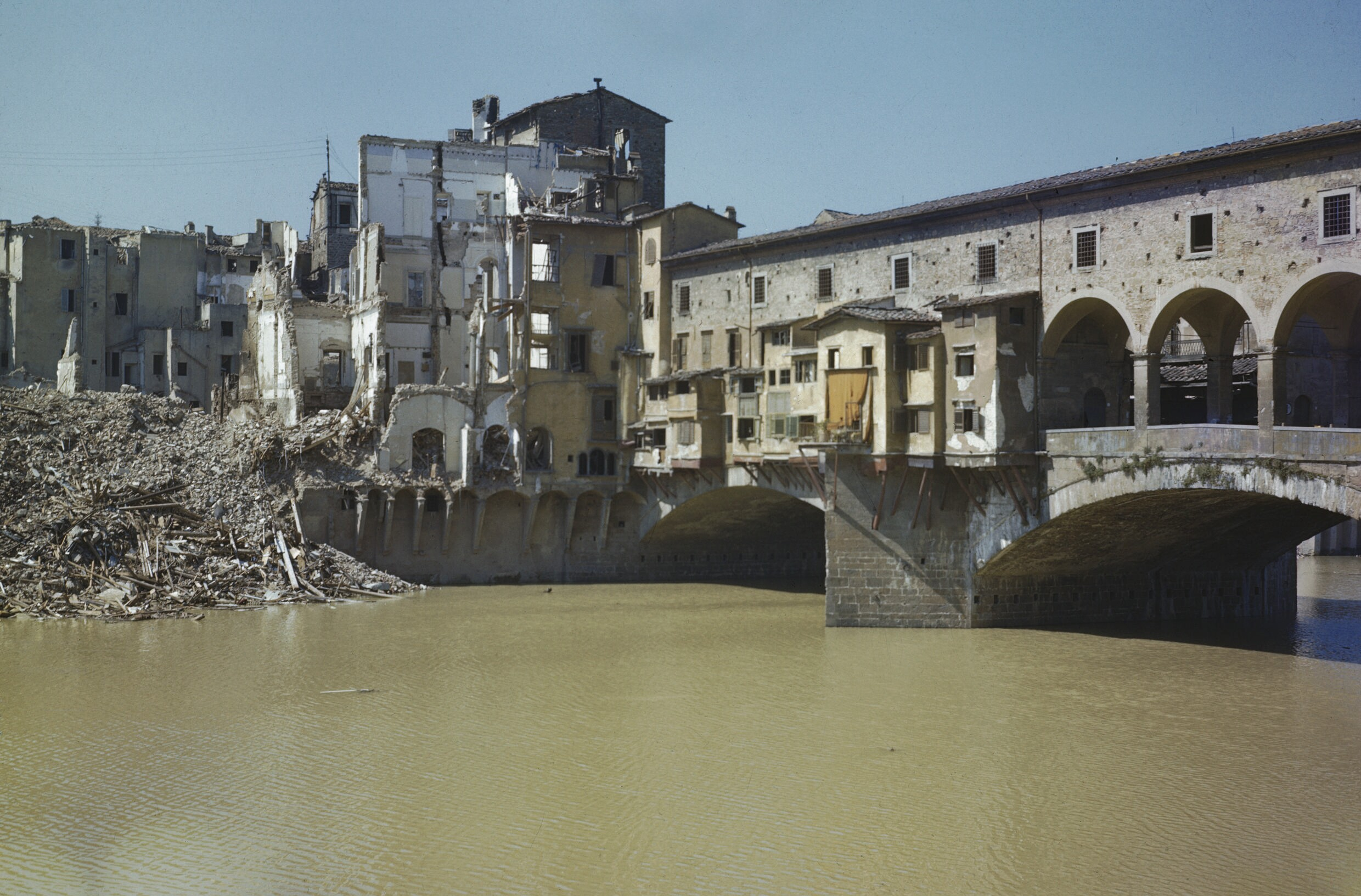
Damage shown shortly after liberation in August 1944 during World War II

During World War II, the Ponte Vecchio was not destroyed by the German army during their retreat at the advance of the British 8th Army on 4 August 1944, unlike all the other bridges in Florence. This was, according to many locals and tour guides, because of an express order by Hitler. German authorities decided to mine all the bridges except for Ponte Vecchio, which was instead surrounded by rubble, to stop crossings and gain more time to deploy the troops along the famous Gothic Line. Access to the Ponte Vecchio was, however, obstructed by the destruction of the buildings at both ends of the bridge, which have since been rebuilt using a combination of original and modern designs.

The bridge was severely damaged in the 1966 flood of the Arno.

Between 2005 and 2006, 5,500 padlocks, known as love locks, which were attached to the railings around the bust of Cellini, were removed by the city council. According to the council, the padlocks were aesthetically displeasing and damaged the bust and its railings. There is now a fine for attaching love locks to the bridge.

An announcement in April 2024 stated that work would be completed on the bridge, including a cleaning, an upgrade of the replacement joints previously installed, strengthening of the stone and restoration of the footpath's stone.

== Panorama ==
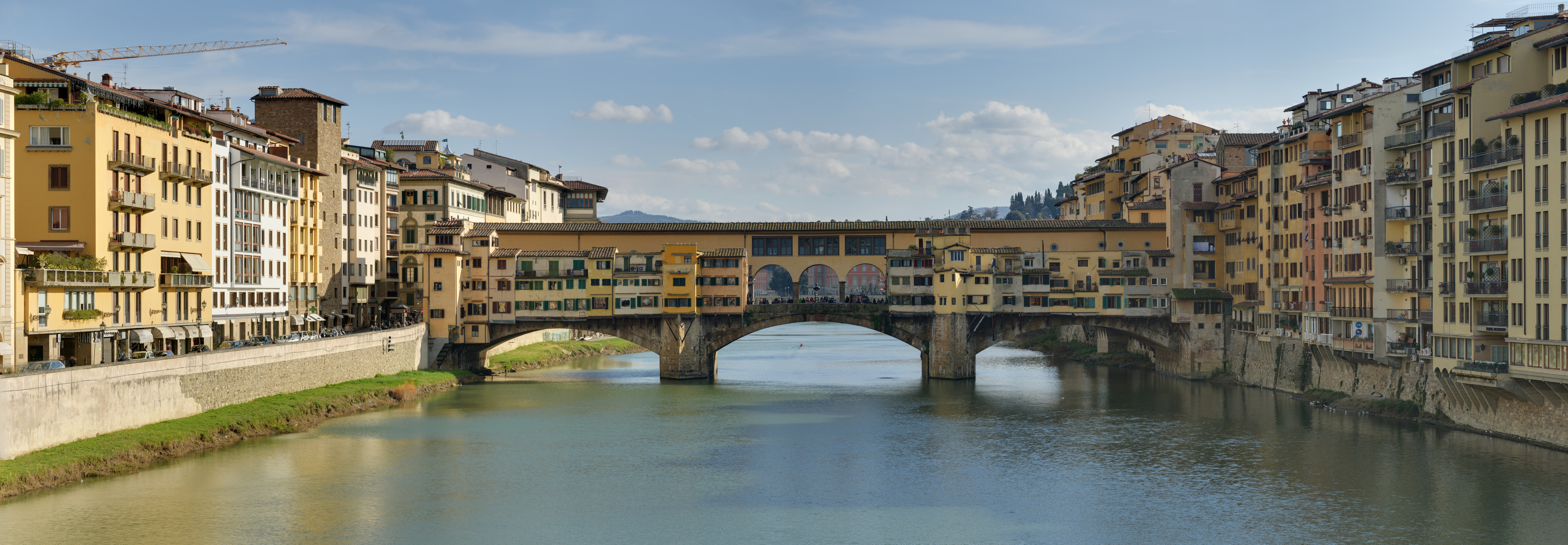
Panoramic view of the Ponte Vecchio, from the west.

== In art ==
- The bridge is mentioned in the aria "O mio babbino caro" by Giacomo Puccini.
- Wall mural in Grossi Florentino, executed by students of Napier Waller under supervision
A comparison of the side elevation of the Ponte Vecchio to the side elevations of some of the most notable bridges around the world on the same scale (see also interactive version)

== See also ==
- Krämerbrücke
- Pulteney Bridge
- Rialto Bridge
