= Buondelmonte de' Buondelmonti =

Florentine nobleman

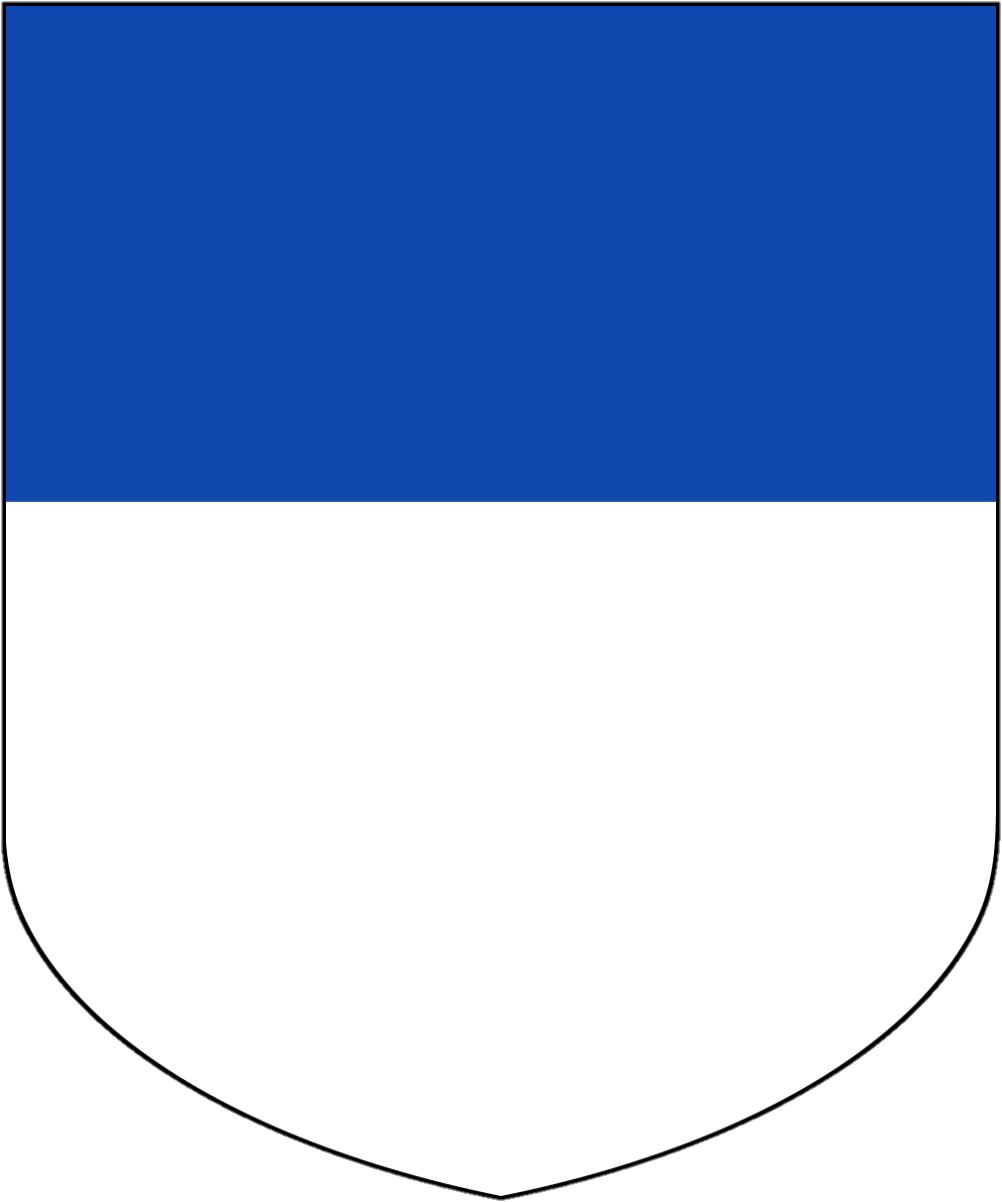
Coat of arms of the Buondelmonti family (XIII sec.).

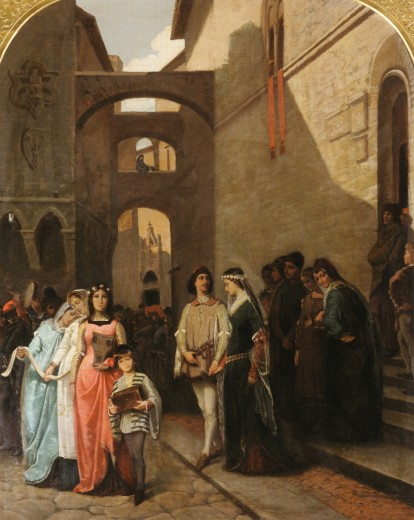
Marriage of Buondelmonte by Saverio Altamura.

Buondelmonte de' Buondelmonti (died 1216) was a Florentine young nobleman, slain on his wedding day. His murder, according to Dante Alighieri, was one of the triggers of intra-familial discord and the conflicts between Guelphs and Ghibellines in his native town.

== Outlines of Story ==
In various chronicles of Florence, the events leading to Buondelmonte's murder are generally described as follows. He had been involved in a brawl with a person attending a celebration held by the prominent Amidei family. In restitution, it was decided by the families that Buondelmonte would be engaged to marry a maiden from the Amidei family. On the engagement day, with the family arrayed outside, the young man insolently rode past the Amidei household, and instead pledged to marry a maiden from the Guelph and aristocratic Donati family.

Furious, the Amidei and their allies debated on how to pursue retribution for what they considered a dishonorable act. One of those noblemen taking part in the discussion, Mosca dei Lamberti, insisted that only the murder of Buondelmonti would avenge the action. On Easter morning, on his way home from the wedding, as Buondelmonte made his way across the Ponte Vecchio, near the site of a statue of the Roman god Mars, the young nobleman was slain by the Amidei and their allies. The events led to cycles of violence between Guelph and Ghibelline families.

== Events in Dante's Works ==
The events were recalled in two encounters by Dante, one in Inferno, canto 28, lines 106-111 when he meets Mosca dei Lamberti in the eighth circle of Hell, where the creators of discord are punished. There Mosca is remembered for having said Capo ha cosa fatta. This famous proverb has been variably interpreted and reused over the centuries. It putatively means that a completed action cannot be undone, and thus Mosca intimated that Buondelmonte's insult required an action with finality, and thus he argued against any half-hearted responses, such as injuring or scarring Buondelmonte. Mosca argued only his death would justly end the insult. However, such a notion proved foolish, since this murder only "seeded" further discord in Tuscany, including as Dante states, death to Mosca's kinsmen. Dante's words cause further grief in Mosca, who has already been punished by the amputation of his hands.

In Paradiso, canto 16, lines 140-147, one of Dante's ancestors recalls the death of Buondelmonte as one example of how noble families, like cities, can fall to ruin. This Guelph-Ghibelline discord would lead to Dante's own exile from Florence.
