= MasterChef India =

Indian competitive cooking game show franchise

- Years: 2010 – present

Films and television
- Television series: MasterChef India – Hindi; MasterChef India – Tamil; MasterChef India – Telugu

Miscellaneous
- Languages: Hindi; Tamil; Telugu
- Produced by: Colosceum Media; Endemol Shine India; Innovative Film Academy
- Based on: MasterChef Australia
- No.of Versions: 3
- No.of Seasons: 10
- Original network: Star India (2010–2020); Sun TV Network (2021); Sony Pictures Networks (2023–present)

Official website
- endemolshineindia.in/key-shows/masterchef/

MasterChef India is an Indian competitive cooking game show franchise based on the Australian show MasterChef Australia, which itself is based on the original British television show MasterChef. MasterChef India – Hindi (Season 1–4) and Junior Masterchef Swaad Ke Ustaad were produced by Colosceum Media. Endemol Shine India has been producing MasterChef India – Hindi since season 5 onwards through Star India and Sun TV Network with Innovative Film Academy co-producing it for other language versions. Sony Pictures Networks have purchased the rights of the franchise and has been producing the show in all the three languages since then. The show has since been premiered on SonyLIV.

It was originally started in Hindi language and has been extended to three languages spoken in the Indian sub-continent, including Telugu and Tamil.

== Overview ==
There are three versions in production. It was first made in the Hindi-language in 2010. Also in 2010, Star India got the rights for producing MasterChef in Hindi. In early-2021, Endemol Shine India decided to expand the show in other Indian languages. Sun TV Network brought the rights of the show for Telugu, Tamil, Malayalam and Kannada-language versions. In 2022, Sony Pictures Networks earned the rights for Master Chef India in Hindi, Tamil, and Telugu.

== History ==
=== Creation ===
MasterChef India is a Hindi language adaptation of the Australian show MasterChef Australia, which itself is based on the original British MasterChef. The first season of MasterChef India – Hindi was aired on StarPlus and hosted by Akshay Kumar, Kunal Kapur and Ajay Chopra.

It continued for eight seasons and Vikas Khanna, Sanjeev Kapoor, Chef Jolly, Ranveer Brar, Zorawar Kalra, Vineet Bhatia, Garima Arora and Pooja Dhingra also participated as judges in different seasons.

MasterChef India – Hindi is currently airing on Sony Entertainment Television since the seventh season.

=== Expansion ===
In early 2021, the show expanded into Telugu, Tamil, Kannada and Malayalam through Sun TV Network. The south regional versions are telecasted by Sun TV, Gemini TV, Udaya TV and Surya TV. The first season of MasterChef India – Tamil was launched on 7 August 2021, while the first season of MasterChef India – Telugu was premiered on 27 August 2021. Vijay Sethupathi and Tamannaah Bhatia are the hosts of Tamil and Telugu versions respectively. The Hindi version never had a host in any of its seasons.

== Versions ==
Currently airing – 1
Upcoming for airing – 0
Recently concluded – 2
No longer airing – 0

Language	Show	Season	Year	Host	Judges			Primary Network	Online VOD	Premiere	Finale	Episodes	Contestants /Pairs(S9)	MasterChef House Location	Prize Money	Winner	Runner Up
Language	Show	Season	Year	Host	1	2	3	Primary Network	Online VOD	Premiere	Finale	Episodes	Contestants /Pairs(S9)	MasterChef House Location	Prize Money	Winner	Runner Up
Hindi (हिन्दी)	MasterChef India – Hindi	1	2010	None	Akshay Kumar	Kunal Kapur	Ajay Chopra	StarPlus	None	16 October 2010	25 December 2010	21	12	Mumbai	₹1 crore (US$110,000)	Pankaj Bhadouria	Jayanandan Bhaskar
Hindi (हिन्दी)	MasterChef India – Hindi	2	2011–2012	None	Vikas Khanna	Kunal Kapur	Ajay Chopra	StarPlus	None	22 October 2011	1 January 2012	22	12	Mumbai	₹1 crore (US$110,000)	Shipra Khanna	Salma Shazia Fathima
Hindi (हिन्दी)	MasterChef India – Hindi	3	2013	None	Vikas Khanna	Kunal Kapur	Sanjeev Kapoor	StarPlus	None	11 March 2013	9 June 2013	70	12	Mumbai	₹1 crore (US$110,000)	Ripudaman Handa	Navneet Rastogi
Hindi (हिन्दी)	MasterChef India – Hindi	4	2015	None	Vikas Khanna	Ranveer Brar	Sanjeev Kapoor	StarPlus	None	26 January 2015	12 April 2015	67	16	Mumbai	₹1 crore (US$110,000)	Nikita Gandhi	Neha Deepak Shah
Hindi (हिन्दी)	MasterChef India – Hindi	5	2016	None	Vikas Khanna	Kunal Kapur	Zorawar Kalra	StarPlus	None	1 October 2016	25 December 2016	26	16	Mumbai	₹50 lakh (US$53,000)	Kirti Bhoutika	Ashima Arora
Hindi (हिन्दी)	MasterChef India – Hindi	6	2019–2020	None	Vikas Khanna	Ranveer Brar	Vineet Bhatia	StarPlus	Disney+ Hotstar	7 December 2019	1 March 2020	25	15	Mumbai	₹25 lakh (US$27,000)	Abinas Nayak	Oindrila Bala
Hindi (हिन्दी)	MasterChef India – Hindi	7	2023	None	Vikas Khanna	Ranveer Brar	Garima Arora	Sony Entertainment Television	YouTube	2 January 2023	31 March 2023	65	16	Mumbai	₹25 lakh (US$27,000)	Nayanjyoti Saikia	Santa Sarmah
Hindi (हिन्दी)	MasterChef India – Hindi	8	2023	None	Vikas Khanna	Ranveer Brar	Pooja Dhingra	SonyLIV		16 October 2023	8 December 2023	40	12	Mumbai	₹25 lakh (US$27,000)	Mohammed Ashiq	Nambie Marak
Hindi (हिन्दी)	MasterChef India – Hindi	9	2026	Paritosh Tripathi	Vikas Khanna	Ranveer Brar	Kunal Kapur	Sony Entertainment Television	SonyLIV	5 January 2026	6 March 2026	45	12	Mumbai	₹20 lakh (US$21,000)	Ajinkya and Vikram Gandhe	Chandana and Saisri Rachakonda
Hindi (हिन्दी)	Junior Masterchef	1	2013	None	Vikas Khanna	Kunal Kapur	Chef Jolly	StarPlus	None	17 August 2013	2 November 2013	22	10	Mumbai	₹25 lakh (US$27,000)	Sarthak Bhardwaj	Harshika Doshi
Hindi (हिन्दी)	Celebrity MasterChef	1	2025	Farah Khan	Vikas Khanna	Ranveer Brar	Farah Khan	Sony Entertainment Television	SonyLIV	27 January 2025	11 April 2025	55	12	Mumbai	₹20 lakh (US$21,000)	Gaurav Khanna	Nikki Tamboli
Tamil (தமிழ்)	MasterChef India – Tamil	1	2021	Vijay Sethupathi Shali Nivekas	Koushik S	Aarthi Sampath	Harish Rao	Sun TV	Sun NXT	7 August 2021	14 November 2021	30	14	Bengaluru	₹25 lakh (US$27,000)	Devaki Vijayaraman	Nithya Franklyn
Tamil (தமிழ்)	MasterChef India – Tamil	2	2024	None	Koushik S	Shreeya Adka	Rakesh Raghunathan	SonyLIV		22 April 2024	7 June 2024	50	12	Mumbai	₹10 lakh (US$11,000)	Akash Muralidharan	Zarina Banu Vani Sundar
Tamil (தமிழ்)	Celebrity MasterChef Tamil	1	2026	Samantha Ruth Prabhu	TBA	TBA	TBA	Sony Vizha	SonyLIV	19 October 2026	TBA	TBA	TBA	TBA	TBA	TBA	TBA
Telugu (తెలుగు)	MasterChef India – Telugu	1	2021	Tamannaah Bhatia Anasuya Bharadwaj	Mahesh Padala	Sanjay Thumma	Chalapathi Rao	Gemini TV	Sun NXT	27 August 2021	27 November 2021	28	14	Bengaluru	₹25 lakh (US$27,000)	K. Krishna Tejasvi	G. D. Anusha
Telugu (తెలుగు)	MasterChef India – Telugu	2	2024	None	Nikitha Umesh	Sanjay Thumma	Chalapathi Rao	SonyLIV		22 April 2024	7 June 2024	35	12	Mumbai	₹25 lakh (US$27,000)	Mahaboob Vin Basha	Shyam Gopisetti

Female Winner Male Winner

== Cancelled versions ==
In August 2021, Banijay announced plans to produce Kannada and Malayalam versions of MasterChef India, with Kichcha Sudeep and Prithviraj Sukumaran announced as the respective hosts. Both versions were scheduled to premiere later that year as part of a four-version commission for the Sun TV Network. However both versions didn't materialized.
