= Ishijyot Surri =

Indian celebrity chef and restaurateur

- Education: Taj IHM-A institute, University of Huddersfield
- Occupation: Chef

Ishijyot Surri is an Indian celebrity chef and restaurateur. He is the founder of SJI Hospitality and the executive chef behind the restaurants Mulk and MiniyaTurk, as well as the catering venture SJI Gourmet. Surri is also associated with Pachinco, an Italian dining and coffee concept. He has also been invited as a guest chef, mentor and guest mentor and culinary expert on MasterChef India and Celebrity MasterChef India.

== Career ==
Surri received his culinary training through the Taj Group's Taj IHM-A institute, which is affiliated with the University of Huddersfield. Early in his career, he worked at several restaurants which includes overseeing of North Indian barbecue poolside restaurant. In 2018, he founded SJI Hospitality, under which he launched Mulk, Pachinco and MiniyaTurk. He later expanded the group's operations with SJI Gourmet, an outdoor catering business.

Outside the restaurant business, Surri founded Gourmet Treats in 2010. In 2023, he obtained certifications as a Tea Blender and Tea Sommelier. He has also co-founded food brands including The Pickled Chick, Nutty Singh, Makhana Singh and ALPS (Always Love Peanut Spread). Surri has also wrote about his culinary experise in numerous newspapers,hospitality publications and food platforms.

== Television ==
Surri has appeared as a guest chef and mentor on MasterChef India, including a two- episode restaurant challenge hosted at MULK. In 2025, he featured on Celebrity MasterChef India as a guest mentor and culinary expert alongside Vikas Khanna and Ranveer Brar.
