= MasterChef India – Hindi season 6 =

MasterChef India – Hindi
- Season 6
- Judges: Vikas Khanna; Ranveer Brar; Vineet Bhatia
- No. of contestants: 15
- Winner: Abhinas Nayak
- Runner-up: Oindrila Bala
- No. of episodes: 25

Release
- Original network: Star Plus
- Original release: 7 December 2019 – 1 March 2020

Season chronology
- ← Previous; Season 5 Next → Season 7

Season 6 of the Indian Hindi-language competitive reality TV series MasterChef India – Hindi premiered on Star Plus on 7 December 2019 and concluded on 1 March 2020.

Vikas Khanna returned as one of the judges for the show while Kunal Kapur and Zorawar Kalra were replaced by Ranveer Brar and Vineet Bhatia. This season marked Khanna's fifth consecutive season serving as a judge on the show and Brar's second season, who was last seen in the fourth season. This season was also comeback for Gunjan Joshi as the writer of the show, who was also writer of Season 3 and 4.

Abinas Nayak, an IT Analyst from Odisha was declared as the winner on 1 March 2020, with Oindrila Bala of West Bengal being the runner-up.

Similar to the past seasons, Amul remained the title sponsor of the show. Additionally, Sleek Kitchens by Asian Paints co-sponsored this season.

== Top 15 ==
Top 30 contestants were chosen from nationwide auditions. During the auditions, The judges selected 10 contestants and gave their aprons with their name on it. The judges gave a second chance to 11 contestants and invited them to the MasterChef kitchen, where they competed in a cook-off to win the final 5 spots. The Top 15 contestants were revealed on 14 December 2019

Contestant	Age	Hometown	Occupation	Status	Winnings
Abinas Nayak	27	Berhampur, Odisha	IT Analyst	Winner; 1 March	10 (Note: Abinas was the only contestant to not have lost any team challenges this season.)
Oindrila Bala	35	Kolkata, West Bengal	Former Tax Consultant	Runner-Up; 1 March	0 (Note: Oindrila was the first finalist who did not win any individual or team challenges throughout the season.)
Smrutisree Singh	26	Angul, Odisha	Hotel General Manager	Eliminated; 29 February	4
Akanksha Khatri	30	Mirzapur, Uttar Pradesh	Former Flight Attendant	Eliminated; 29 February	6
Natasha Gandhi	25	Mumbai, Maharashtra	Entrepreneur	Eliminated; 23 February	3
Prince Sharma	23	Amritsar, Punjab	Food Industry Trainer	Eliminated; 23 February	4
Mahendra Thulung	32	Darjeeling, West Bengal	Restaurateur / Interior Designer	Eliminated; 12 January; Returned; 9 February; Eliminated; 23 February	1
Nandini Diwakar	33	Lucknow, Uttar Pradesh	Chef Consultant	Eliminated; 15 February	3
Akash Sonkar	27	Delhi	Telecom Distributor	Eliminated; 15 February	3
Priyanka Biswas	27	Bilaspur, Chhattisgarh	Dentist	Eliminated; 9 February	2
Ulka Santra	21	Kolkata, West Bengal	Salesman	Eliminated; 2 February	3
Viji Raj	54	Chennai, Tamil Nadu	Rental Homecook	Eliminated; 26 January	1
Jaspal Rawat	35	Udhampur, Jammu and Kashmir	Military Chef	Eliminated; 5 January	2
Harsh Bothra	18	Delhi	Student	Eliminated; 29 December	0
Harshita Agarwal	26	Amritsar, Punjab	Home Baker	Eliminated; 22 December	0

== Elimination Table ==
Place	Contestant	Episode																											
Place	Contestant	4		5	6	7	8		9	10	11	12	13 (Note: Unlike the typical team challenges, post this challenge, the members of the losing team did not compete in an elimination test.)	14		15	16 (Note: Despite being in the losing team in the first round, Oindrila and Ulka were exempted from the Elimination Challenge in the second round because the team captain (Priyanka) chose herself, Viji, and Akash as competitors in the said challenge.)		17	18 (Note: Eight contestants walked in for the elimination challenge, of which, Akash, Akanksha, and Natasha redeemed themselves in the first round (chocolate taste test); the remaining five who couldn't pass the taste test, went on to cook in the second round highlighted below.)	19	20		21	22	23		24	25
1	Abinas	TOP	IMN	WIN	SAFE	IN	IN	SAFE	IN	SAFE (Note: Abinas used his previously won Immunity Pin to spare himself from the elimination challenge in this episode.)	WIN	SAFE	WIN	WIN	WEAK	IN	WIN	SAFE	WIN	SAFE	WIN	SAFE		TOP	IN	IN	WIN	TOP	WINNER
2	Oindrila	IN	SAFE	LOSE	PT	IN	IN	SAFE	TOP	SAFE	LOSE	PT	LOSE	SAFE		TOP	LOSE	SAFE	BTM	WEAK	LOSE	PT	SAFE	WEAK	IN	IN	IN	TOP	RUNNER-UP
3	Akanksha	WIN	WEAK	WIN	SAFE	IN	BTM	PT	TOP	SAFE	WIN	SAFE	WIN	IN	SAFE	WIN	SAFE		BTM	SAFE	LOSE	PT	SAFE	TOP	TICKET TO FINALE			ELIM	
3	Smrutisree	IN	SAFE	WIN	SAFE	IN	IN	SAFE	WIN	SAFE	LOSE	PT	LOSE	SAFE		IN	WIN	SAFE	BTM	PT	LOSE	WIN	SAFE	PT	IN	IN	IN	ELIM	
5	Natasha	TOP	IN	LOSE	PT	WIN	SAFE		IN	PT	LOSE	PT	LOSE	SAFE		IN	WIN	SAFE	BTM	SAFE	WIN	SAFE		WEAK	IN	IN	ELIM		
6	Prince	WEAK	SAFE	LOSE	PT	WIN	SAFE		IN	PT	LOSE	PT	WIN	IN	SAFE	IN	WIN	SAFE	BTM	PT	WIN	SAFE		TOP	IN	ELIM			
6	Mahendra	WEAK	SAFE	WIN	SAFE	IN	IN	SAFE	IN	PT	LOSE	ELIM											RET (Note: Other contestants who competed in the Wild Card Entry challenge were Harsh, Ulka, and Priyanka.)	PT	IN	ELIM			
8	Nandini	IN	SAFE	LOSE	PT	IN	BTM	PT	IN	PT	LOSE	PT	WIN	TOP	IN	IN	WIN	SAFE	WIN	SAFE	LOSE	PT	SAFE	ELIM					
8	Akash	IN	SAFE	WIN	SAFE	IN	IN	SAFE	IN	PT	LOSE	PT	WIN	TOP	IMN	IN	LOSE	PT	BTM	SAFE	LOSE	WEAK	SAFE	ELIM (Note: Although he had the Immunity Pin, Akash decided to not use it and participated in the Elimination Challenge.)					
10	Priyanka	IN	SAFE	LOSE	PT	WIN	SAFE		IN	PT	WIN	SAFE	LOSE	SAFE		TOP	LOSE	PT	BTM	PT	LOSE	ELIM							
11	Ulka	IN	SAFE	WIN	SAFE	WIN	SAFE		IN	PT	WIN	SAFE	LOSE	SAFE		IN	LOSE	SAFE	BTM	ELIM									
12	Viji	IN	SAFE	LOSE	PT	WIN	SAFE		IN	PT	LOSE	PT	LOSE	SAFE		IN	LOSE	ELIM											
13	Jaspal	X		WIN	SAFE	WIN	SAFE		IN	ELIM																			
14	Harsh	IN	SAFE	LOSE	BTM	IN	BTM	ELIM																					
15	Harshita	BTM	X		ELIM																								

(WINNER) This cook won the competition.
(RUNNER-UP) This cook finished in second place.
(WIN) The cook won the Mystery Box challenge, or any other individual / pair challenge.
(WIN) The cook was on the winning team in the Team Challenge and directly advanced to the next round.
(TOP) The cook was one of the top entries in the individual challenge.
(IMN) The cook won an Immunity Pin in a given challenge.
(SAFE) The cook didn't participate in the challenge as he/she already advanced to the next round.
(IN) The cook wasn't selected as a top or bottom entry in an individual / pair challenge.
(IN) The cook wasn't selected as a top or bottom entry in a team challenge.
(PT) The cook competed in the Elimination Test, and advanced.
(LOSE) The cook was on the losing team in the Team Challenge and had to compete in the upcoming elimination challenge.
(WEAK) The cook was one of the bottom entries in an individual challenge.
(BTM) The cook was one of the bottom entries in an individual challenge and had to compete in the upcoming elimination challenge.
(RET) The cook won the Wild Card Challenge and returned to the competition.
(X) This cook did not participate in the challenge(s).
(ELIM) The cook was eliminated from MasterChef.

== Episodes ==
No. in season	Title	Original release date
1	"Flavourful Auditions"	7 December 2019
2	"Chances and Second Chances!"	8 December 2019
3	"Meet the Top 15"	14 December 2019
Special Guest: Ripu Daman Handa
4	"Mystery Box and the Immunity Pin"	15 December 2019
Grand Dish Wall Win: Akanksha Khatri
5	"MasterChef Premier League"	21 December 2019
Notable Guests: Brian Lara, Irfan Pathan, Hemang Badani, Parthiv Patel, Jatin Sapru, Mayanti Langer, among others.
6	"The Blindfold Challenge"	22 December 2019
7	"The Open Kitchen Challenge"	28 December 2019
8	"Cooking Up A Storm"	29 December 2019
9	"The 20-20 Challenge"	4 January 2020
Grand Dish Wall Win: Smrutisree Singh
10	"The Dreaded Eliminations"	5 January 2020
11	"The Relay Challenge"	11 January 2020
12	"The Replica Challenge"	12 January 2020
13	"Big Fat MasterChef Wedding"	18 January 2020
Special Guest: Divya Khosla Kumar
14	"Race for the Immunity Pin"	19 January 2020
Grand Dish Wall Win: Abinas Nayak
15	"The Salty Dessert Challenge"	25 January 2020
Grand Dish Wall Win: Akanksha Khatri
16	"Republic Day Challenge"	26 January 2020
17	"The Auction Challenge"	1 February 2020
18	"The Chocolate Challenge"	2 February 2020
Special Guest: Rupinder Singh Sodhi
19	"Ranveer's Bag of Surprises"	8 February 2020
20	"Wild Card Eliminations"	9 February 2020
Grand Dish Wall Win: Smrutisree Singh
21	"A Valentine's Day 'Surprise'"	15 February 2020
22	"The Golden Apron Challenge"	16 February 2020
Guest Chef: Amninder Sandhu
23	"The Toughest Challenge"	23 February 2020
24	"The Grand Finale - Part 1!"	29 February 2020
25	"The Grand Finale - Part 2!"	1 March 2020
Notable Guests: Surbhi Jyoti, Maria Goretti, Amninder Sandhu, Rohit Sangwan, Pankaj Bhadouria, Ripu Daman Handa, Nikita Gandhi, Kirti Bhoutika, Imitiaz Qureshi, Adnan Sami, Varun Sharma, among others.
