= Celebrity MasterChef (Indian TV series) =

- Hosted by: Farah Khan
- Judges: Farah Khan; Ranveer Brar; Vikas Khanna; Kunal Kapur
- No. of contestants: 12
- Winner: Gaurav Khanna
- Runner-up: Nikki Tamboli
- No. of episodes: 55

Release
- Original network: Sony Entertainment Television
- Original release: 27 January – 18 April 2025

Celebrity MasterChef is an Indian Hindi-language competitive cooking game show and the spin-off of the series MasterChef India – Hindi, featuring celebrity contestants. Ranveer Brar and Vikas Khanna reprised their roles as judges from the original series, while Farah Khan joined as the first ever host on the MasterChef India – Hindi, also being the co-judge.

The show was won by Gaurav Khanna, with Nikki Tamboli finishing second, and Tejasswi Prakash placing third.

Celebrity Masterchef - Masterclass - an extension of the show, featuring contestants, judges, and home cooks from previous seasons premiered on 14th April 2025 and concluded on 18th April 2025.

== Contestants ==
Sl no	Contestant	Age	Notability	Status	Ref.
1	Gaurav Khanna	43	Actor	Winner; 11 April	
2	Nikki Tamboli	28	Actress and Reality show alumnus	1st runner-up 11 April	
3	Tejasswi Prakash	31	Actress	2nd runner-up 11 April	
4	Faisal Sheikh	30	Social media personality	Finalists (Top 5); 11 April	
5	Rajiv Adatia	36	Social media personality	Finalists (Top 5); 11 April	
6	Archana Gautam	29	Model, actress	Eliminated; 3 April	
7	Usha Nadkarni	78	Actress	Eliminated; 25 March	
8	Dipika Kakar	37	Actress	Withdrew; 17 March	
9	Kabita Singh	46	Social media personality	Eliminated; 7 March	
10	Ayesha Jhulka	52	Actress	Eliminated; 21 February	
11	Abhijeet Sawant	43	Singer	Eliminated; 14 February	
12	Chandan Prabhakar	44	Comedian	Eliminated; 7 February	

== Elimination table ==
Place	Contestant	Episodes																																															
Place	Contestant	Week 1						Week 2				Week 3				Week 4				Week 5						Week 6					Week 7			Week 8			Week 9					Week 10				Week 11			
Place	Contestant	1	2		3	4	5	6	7	8-9	10	11	12-13	14	15	16	17-18	19	20	21		22		23-24	25	26	27	28	29	30	31-32	32-33-34	34-35	36-37	38-39	39-40	41	42	43	44	45	46	47	48-49	49-50	51	52	53	54-55
1	Gaurav	IN	IN	IN	IN	IN	HIGH	IN	IN	LOW	PT	HIGH	WIN	IMM		HIGH	IN	WIN	IMM	IN	IN	WIN	IN	LOW	PT	WIN	LOW	IN	LOW	PT	IN	WIN	HIGH	IMM	PT	PT	PT	PT	WIN	IN	IN	IN	WIN	IMM	WIN	WIN	HIGH	IN	WINNER
2	Nikki	WIN	IN	IN	IN	IN	IN	IN	IN	LOW	PT	HIGH	LOW	LOW	PT	LOW	WIN	IMM		IN	IMN	IN	IN	HIGH	IMM	IN	LOW	IN	LOW	PT	IN	IN	WIN	IMM	PT	PT	PT	IMM	WIN	IMM	IN	WIN	LOW	PT	IN	IN	IN	HIGH	RUNNER-UP
3	Tejasswi	HIGH	IN	IN	IN	IN	HIGH	IN	WIN	LOW	PT	LOW	LOW	WIN	IMM	IN	IN	WIN	IMM	IN	HIGH	IN	WIN	HIGH	IMM	IN	LOW	IN	WIN	IMM	IN	IN	WIN	IMM	PT	PT	PT	PT	LOW	IN	IN	IN	WIN	IMM	IN	IN	IN	IN	THIRD
4	Faisal	IN	WIN	IN	IN	IN	IN	IN	IN	WIN	IMM	WIN	WIN	IMM		IN	IN	LOW	PT	IN	IN	IN	IN	LOW	PT	IN	WIN	IMM			IN	IN	IN	PT	PT	IMM	IMM		LOW	WIN	IN	IN	LOW	PT	IN	IN	WIN	IN	ELIM
5	Rajiv	IN	IN	IN	IN	IN	IN	IN	IN	WIN	IMM	LOW	LOW	HIGH	PT	IN	IN	WIN	IMM	WIN	IN	IN	IN	HIGH	IMM	IN	WIN	IN	LOW	PT	WIN	IN	IN	PT	PT	PT	PT	PT	LOW	IN	IN	IN	LOW	PT	IN	IN	IN	IN	ELIM
6	Archana	IN	IN	LOW	IN	LOW	EXC	IN	IN	WIN	IMM	IN	WIN	IMM		LOW	WIN	IMM		IN	IN	IN	LOW	EXC	PT	IN	WIN	IMM			IN	WIN	IN	PT	PT	PT	PT	PT	WIN	IN	IN	IN	LOW	ELIM	VIS				
7	Usha	HIGH	LOW	IN	IN	LOW	EXC	IN	IN	LOW	IMM	IN	WIN	IMM		WIN	IN	LOW	IMM	LOW	EXC	IN	IN	HIGH	IMM	IN	WIN	WIN	IMM		IN	IN	IN	PT	PT	PT	PT	ELIM			VIS				VIS				
8	Dipika	IN	LOW	WIN	IN	IN	IMN	HIGH	IN	WIN	IMM	LOW	EXC		PIN	HI	IN	LOW	PT	IN	IN	IN	IN	LOW	HI	EXC				PT	IN	IN	IN	WDR															
9	Kabita	IN	IN	IN	LOW	EXC		HIGH	WIN	WIN	IMM	IN	LOW	LOW	PT	IN	IN	WIN	IMM	LOW	EXC	IN	IN	LOW	PT	IN	LOW	IN	LOW	ELIM																			
10	Ayesha											IN	WIN	IMM		IN	IN	LOW	ELIM																														
11	Abhijeet	IN	IN	IN	LOW	EXC		IN	IN	WIN	IMM	IN	LOW	LOW	ELIM																														VIS				
12	Chandan	IN	LOW	LOW	EXC			WIN	IN	LOW	ELIM																																						

(WINNER) The cook won the competition.
(RUNNER-UP) The cook finished as runner-up in the finals.
(THIRD) The cook placed third in the finals.
(WIN) The cook won an individual challenge.
(WIN) The cook won a pair/team challenge.
(HIGH) The cook was one of the top entries in an individual challenge.
(HIGH) The cook was one of the top entries in a pair/team challenge.
(IN) The cook wasn't selected as a top or bottom entry in an individual challenge.
(IN) The cook wasn't selected as a top or bottom entry in a pair/team challenge.
(IN) The cook dish wasn’t tasted but advanced.
(LOW) The cook was one of the bottom entries in an individual challenge.
(LOW) The cook was one of the bottom entries in a pair/team challenge.
(EXC) The cook was excluded from the challenge.
(HI) The cook was excluded from the challenge due to health issues.
(IMM) The cook participated in the challenge but was safe from elimination.
(IMM) The cook didn't participate in the challenge as he/she had already advanced to the next week.
(IMM) The cook was saved via advantage and didn't have to compete in the challenge.
(IMN) The cook won an immunity pin in an Immunity pin challenge.
(PIN) The cook used an immunity pin to be exempted from the elimination challenge.
(PT) The cook competed in the black apron challenge in elimination round, and advanced.
(WDR) The cook withdrew from MasterChef Kitchen.
(ELIM) The cook was eliminated from MasterChef Kitchen.
(VIS) The cook returned to MasterChef Kitchen as a guest and participated in a challenge.

== Episodes ==
No. overall	No. in season	Title	Original release date
1	1	"Kitchen Is Set"	January 27, 2025
Mystery Box Challenge: Prepare a dish using Harappan civilization ingredients and without using any electric equipments.; Top Dishes: Nikki, Usha Tai and Tejasswi; Challenge Winner: Nikki
2	2	"Messy Egg Challenge"	January 28, 2025
Skills Test: Prepare a perfect meringue.; Previous Challenge Winner Advantage: Delay cooking for 2 minutes of two contestants. Nikki choose Dipika and Rajiv.; Challenge Winner: Faisal; Bottom Dishes: Chandan, Usha Tai and Dipika; Skills Test: Prepare a dish with Eggs in 45 minutes.; Previous Challenge Winner Advantage: Pause cooking for 5 minutes of any bottom contestant from previous challenge. Faisal choose Chandan.; Challenge Winner: Dipika; Bottom Dishes: Chandan and Archana; Result: Chandan was excluded from the immunity pin race.
3	3	"State and Country Fusion Challenge"	January 29, 2025
Pairs Challenge: Fusion between Indian States and Country.; Pairs: Dipika and Tejasswi, Rajiv and Faisal, Nikki and Gaurav, Archana and Usha Tai, and Kabita and Abhijeet.; Round 1: Integrate an Indian state and a foreign country ingredients and prepare a welcome drink.; Challenge Winner: Usha tai and Archana; Result: Kabita and Abhijeet were bottom pair and was excluded from the immunity pin race.
4	4	"State and Country Fusion Challenge - Part 2"	January 30, 2025
Round 2: Prepare two dishes from assigned Indian state and foreign country.; Twist: Only 1 dish of each pair were tasted.; Result: Usha Tai and Archana were bottom pair and was excluded from the immunity pin race.
5	5	"Vikas Khanna Replication Challenge"	January 31, 2025
Replica Challenge: Replicate Chef Vikas dish, 'Brahmand' lit. Universe .; Top Dishes: Dipika, Tejasswi and Gaurav.; Result: Dipika won an immunity pin.
6	6	"Tribute to the Loved Ones"	February 3, 2025
Skills Test: Prepare a dish that depicts a precious memory of their life in 70 minutes.; Top Dishes: Chandan, Kabita and Dipika; Challenge Winner: Chandan
7	7	"Winter on a Plate"	February 4, 2025
Skills Test: Prepare a dish with seasonal winter ingredients in 55 minutes introduced by Chef Kunal Kapur.; Twists: Use Liquid Nitrogen. Only 7 out of 11 dish were tasted.; Previous Challenge Winner Advantage: Chandan can call Chef Kunal for assistance for 5 minutes.; Dishes chosen to taste: Tejasswi, Kabita, Chandan, Dipika, Gaurav, Faisal and Abhijeet; Challenge Winners: Kabita and Tejasswi
8	8	"First-Ever Team Service Challenge - Part 1"	February 5, 2025
Team Challenge: Contestants in team have to work in a restaurant to serve fifteen notable guests.; Pink Team: Kabita (Captain), Rajiv, Faisal, Abhijeet, Dipika and Archana; Blue Team: Tejasswi (Captain), Usha Tai, Gaurav, Nikki and Chandan; Previous Challenge Winner Advantage: Tejasswi and Kabita become the captains of the team pink and team blue respectively.
9	9	"First-Ever Team Service Challenge - Part 2"	February 6, 2025
Challenge Winner: Pink Team; Result: Pink Team, Kabita, Rajiv, Faisal, Abhijeet, Dipika and Archana received immunity.; Abhijeet and Faisal from the pink team had the best dishes and won Veeba power card.
10	10	"First Elimination Challenge"	February 7, 2025
Veeba's Power Card Advantage: Abhijeet and Faisal can save a non-immune contestant. They choose Usha Tai.; Black Apron Elimination Challenge: Prepare a dish with a given type of chilli as a main ingredient.; Bottom Dishes: Tejasswi and Chandan; Result: Chandan was eliminated from MasterChef Kitchen.
11	11	"Liquid to Solid Challenge"	February 10, 2025
Ayesha Jhulka entered as a wildcard contestant.; Skills Test: Prepare a solid dish with given liquid item.; Top Dishes: Gaurav, Nikki and Faisal; Challenge Winner: Faisal; Bottom Dishes: Tejasswi, Rajiv and Dipika; Result: Dipika were given Black Apron.
12	12	"Double Trouble Team Challenge - Part 1"	February 11, 2025
Team Challenge: Prepare a dish with three star ingredients.; Red Team: Faisal (Captain), Ayesha, Archana, Usha Tai and Gaurav; Green Team: Nikki (Captain), Abhijeet, Rajiv, Kabita and Tejasswi; Previous Challenge Winner Advantage: Faisal become captain of a team and also choose captain of the other team, Nikki.; Twists: Only 2 people can cook at a time. In every fifteen minutes, they had to swap their places.
13	13	"Double Trouble Team Challenge - Part 2"	February 12, 2025
Challenge Winner: Red Team; Result: Red Team, Faisal, Ayesha, Archana, Usha Tai and Gaurav received immunity.
14	14	"Golden Mystery Box Challenge"	February 13, 2025
Golden Mystery Box Challenge: Prepare a dish with a minimum of 5 ingredients from the Golden Mystery Box.; Top Dishes: Tejasswi and Rajiv; Result: Tejasswi received immunity.
15	15	"Pooja Dhingra's Elimination Challenge"	February 14, 2025
Black Apron Elimination Challenge: Replicate Chef Pooja Dhingra's French dessert 'Croquembouche' in 120 minutes.; Dipika used her immunity pin to be exempted from the challenge.; Top Dishes: Rajiv and Nikki; Bottom Dishes: Abhijeet and Kabita; Eliminated: Abhijeet was eliminated from MasterChef Kitchen.
16	16	"Festival Challenge"	February 17, 2025
Skills Test: Prepare a dish related to an Indian festival.; Twist: Prepare a sweet dish with main dish (if preparing savoury) and prepare a savoury dish with main dish (if preparing sweet).; Top Dishes: Gaurav and Usha Tai; Challenge Winner: Usha Tai; Bottom Dishes: Nikki and Archana
17	17	"Blind Fold Challenge - Part 1"	February 18, 2025
Mini Challenge: Any one contestant from each pair have to guess an item by a sense of touch, smell, and taste from fifty food ingredients.; Pairs: Dipika and Usha Tai, Nikki and Archana, Gaurav and Tejasswi, Faisal and Ayesha, Rajiv and Kabita; Mini Challenge Winner: Dipika.; Blind Wall Challenge: Prepare a identical dish without visual communication.; Previous Challenge Advantage Winner: Dipika and Usha can see their visually communicate and assist each other for 5 minutes.; Previous Challenge Disadvantage: Nikki and Archana cannot communicate to each other for 10 minutes.
18	18	"Blind Fold Challenge - Part 2"	February 19, 2025
Challenge Winner: Nikki and Archana; Result: Nikki and Archana received immunity.
19	19	"Theatre Food Challenge"	February 20, 2025
Previous Challenge Advantage Winner: Nikki and Archana formed teams.; Red Team: Faisu (Team Captain), Ayesha, Usha Tai and Dipika; Yellow Team: Gaurav (Team Captain), Tejasswi, Rajiv and Kabita; Team Challenge: Prepare a Korean / Mexican cuisine dishes and sell them to people in cinema.; Twist: Nikki and Archana participated in the mid-challenge. Nikki joined team yellow and Archana joined team red.; Challenge Winner: Yellow Team, Gaurav, Tejasswi, Rajiv and Kabita received immunity.
20	20	"Elimination Challenge"	February 21, 2025
Previous Challenge Advantage Winner: Yellow Team Captain Gaurav was given an advantage to save a non-immune contestant. He choose Usha.; Black Apron Elimination Challenge: Faisal, Dipika and Ayesha were given three protein and Pastes.; Faisal - Mutton and Rogan Josh Paste; Dipika - Fish and Shorshe Bata; Ayesha - Chicken and Assamese Black Sesame Paste; Prepare a dish from given ingredients.: Bottom Dishes: Ayesha and Faisal; Result: Ayesha was eliminated from MasterChef Kitchen.
21	21	"Second Chance for Immunity Pin"	February 24, 2025
Skills Test: Finely Chop 500 gm onions.; Challenge Winner: Rajiv Adatia; Bottom Contestants: Usha tai and Kabita were excluded from the immunity pin challenge.; Immunity Pin Challenge: Prepare a dish inspired by Farah Khan's Roast Chicken in 75 minutes.; Previous Challenge Advantage Winner: Rajiv got an additional 5 minute advantage. He also choose two contestants who will begin their cooking after 5 minutes.( He chose Archana and Nikki.); Top Dishes: Tejasswi and Nikki; Result: Nikki won an immunity pin.
22	22	"Fun with Italy"	February 25, 2025
Skills Test: Prepare three different types of stuffed pasta in three colours in 20 minutes.; Challenge Winner: Gaurav Khanna; Skills Test: Prepare a dish of colour based on Italy's flag colour.; Red: Usha Tai, Nikki, and Archana; 'White: Gaurav, Tejasswi, Dipika and Kabita; Green: Rajiv and Faisu; Previous Challenge Advantage Winner: Gaurav can call Chef Ranveer for assistance for 10 minutes.; Challenge Winner: Tejasswi; Bottom Dish: Archana; Result: Archana were given Black Apron.
23	23	"Healthy Food Challenge"	February 26, 2025
Pairs Challenge: Prepare a healthy dish.; Pairs: Tejasswi and Nikki, Rajiv and Usha Tai, Dipika and Faisu and Gaurav and Kabita; Previous Challenge Advantage Winner: Tejasswi can choose her partner, she choose Nikki.; Twists: One contestant from each pair have to do cycling to turn on gas supply. Pairs also have to switch on judges calls. Archana proxies Usha Tai.
24	24	"Healthy Food Challenge - Part 2"	February 27, 2025
Twist: Prepare a healthy dessert. Contestant can now cook at the same time.; Top Dishes: Rajiv and Usha Tai and Nikki and Tejasswi; Bottom Dishes: Gaurav and Kabita and Faisu and Dipika
25	25	"Overnight Cooking Challenge"	February 28, 2025
Dipika was hospitalized and did not participate in the challenge.; Black Apron Elimination Challenge: Prepare a dish that involves overnight cooking technique introduced by Chef Romi Gill.; Result: No Elimination
26	26	"Replica Dish Challenge"	March 3, 2025
Dipika was excluded and received Black Apron.; Replica Challenge: Replicate Chef Ranveer's dish.; Twist: In mid-challenge recipe page were taken away.; Challenge Winner: Gaurav
27	27	"Coconut Team Challenge"	March 4, 2025
Team Challenge: Prepare a four-course meal with coconut as core ingredient in 120 minutes.; Red Team: Archana (Captain), Rajiv, Usha Tai, Faisu; Blue Team: Gaurav (Captain), Tejasswi, Nikki, Kabita; Twist: Teams have to serve a dish in every 30 minutes.; Challenge Winner: Red Team
28	28	"Phool aur Kaante Challenge"	March 5, 2025
Previous Challenge Winner Advantage: Red Team Captain, Archana received immunity. She can also immune any of her teammate. Archana choose Faisal.; Remaining Teammate Rajiv and Usha Tai can take Archana and Faisal's assistance for 5 minutes. Both choose Faisal.: Mystery Box Challenge: Prepare a dish with Thorn Plant / Flower, assigned by Archana.; Twist: Only contestants assigned Thorn Plant can access Pantry.; Challenge Winner: Usha Tai
29	29	"The Taste Test"	March 6, 2025
Mini Challenge: Identify ingredients of a dish by tasting.; Mini-Challenge Winner: Tejasswi; Main Challenge: Prepare a dish using Dosa Batter in 30 minutes.; Previous Challenge Winner Advantage: Contestants must stop cooking for 5 minutes except Tejasswi.; Challenge Winner: Tejasswi Prakash
30	30	"Lucky Dip Challenge"	March 7, 2025
Black Apron Elimination Challenge: Prepare a dish using four ingredients from categories, Protein, Nuts and Seeds, Fruits and Vegetables, and Cheese from Lucky Dip.; Result: Kabita was eliminated from MasterChef Kitchen.
31	31	"Chef Manu Chandra's Challenge"	March 10, 2025
Follow Along Challenge: Prepare a dish following Chef Manu Chandra inspired by Tomato Shorba in 90 minutes.; Previous Week Best Dish Advantage: Choose a contestant who cannot see Chef Manu for five minutes. Nikki choose Rajiv.
32	32	"Wheel of Fortune Pair Challenge By Chef Ajay Chopra"	March 11, 2025
Challenge Winner: Rajiv Adatia; Pairs Challenge: Chef Ajay Chopra introduced Fortune Wheel having 25 ingredients. Each pair rolled wheel twice, and received two core ingredients to prepare either Sweet or Savoury dish.; Pairs: Rajiv and Nikki, Tejasswi and Usha Tai, Faisu and Dipika, and Archana and Gaurav.
33	33	"Wheel of Fortune Pair Challenge By Chef Ajay Chopra - Part 2"	March 12, 2025
Previous Challenge Winner Advantage: Choose a pair who will work for 5 minutes with tied hands together. Rajiv choose Archana and Gaurav.; Twists: Pairs have to serve a dish in two portions, the other for contestants househelp.
34	34	""Hina and Rocky's Wedding Menu Challenge""	March 13, 2025
Challenge Winner: Gaurav and Archana; Team Challenge: Prepare a four-course meal for guests Hina Khan and Rocky Jaiswal's wedding menu in 120 minutes.; Team Ladkewale: Dipika, Nikki, Rajiv and Usha Tai .; Team Ladkiwale: Archana, Tejasswi, Gaurav and Faisu.
35	35	"Hina and Rocky's Wedding Menu Challenge - Part 2"	March 14, 2025
Previous Challenge Winner Advantage: Choose a teammate from opposite team to stop their cooking for 5 minutes. They choose Nikki and Rajiv.; Challenge Winner: Tejasswi, Nikki and Gaurav.; Result: Tejasswi received Chef Ranveer's Knife and were immune. Nikki from Team Ladkewale, and Gaurav from Team Ladkiwale received immunity.
36	36	"Veeba Taste Test"	March 17, 2025
Dipika withdrew from MasterChef Kitchen due to health issues.; Mini Challenge: Contestants have to taste Veeba Sauces and Dressings to identify their ingredients.; Challenge Winner: Rajiv; Black Apron Elimination Challenge: Prepare a dish related to Holi in 90 minutes. The top dish will be featured in Chef Zorawar Kalra's restaurant.; Twist: Family members of contestants assisted them in cooking. Immuned contestants also competed in the challenge but not judged.
37	37	"Holi Special Challenge"	March 18, 2025
Previous Challenge Winner Advantage: Rajiv can take assistance from any contestants family member. He choose Archana's mother; Result: No Elimination; Top Dish: Faisal
38	38	"Black Apron Challenge"	March 19, 2025
The contestants will have to cook in Black Aprons and The winner of each challenge will be safe for the whole week; Chef Kunal Kapur proxies Chef Vikas Khanna.; Black Apron Challenge: Prepare a dish with 4 elements in one utensil only.; Twist: Contestants have to swap their counters and complete their present neighbour dish to judges except Faisal.; Counter Swaps, Archana and Rajiv.; Nikki and Tejasswi; Gaurav and Usha Tai .
39	39	"Delhi Spice Test"	March 20, 2025
Black Apron Challenge Winner: Faisal Sheikh; Result: Faisal received immunity.; Black Apron Challenge: Round 1: One contestant from each pair have to guess the Delhi's spice by sense of touch.; Pairs: Nikki and Tejasswi, Usha and Rajiv, Archana and Gaurav.; Round 1 Winner: Usha Tai and Rajiv
40	40	"Delhi Chaat Challenge"	March 21, 2025
Round 2: Pairs have to prepare a Chaat and Chaat Masala individually in 20 minutes.; Previous Challenge Winner Advantage: Rajiv and Usha get extra 5 minutes.; Round 2 Winner: Archana and Gaurav.; Round 3: Prepare a dish with Delhi's famous delicacy and a spice mix that were won in auction. Contestants have to auction with their allocated time to receive their dish elements. The minimum bid would be 10 minutes and thereafter of multiples of 5 minutes.; Previous Challenge Winner Advantage: Archana and Gaurav allocated the cooking time to pairs.; Archana and Gaurav - 120 minutes; Tejasswi and Usha Tai - 100 minutes; Rajiv and Nikki - 90 minutes
41	41	"Delhi Special Challenge"	March 24, 2025
Auction Results in order, Nihari and Kashmiri Ver -Tejasswi for 25 minutes, Remaining time 75 minutes.; Chicken Tikka and Shichimi Togarashi Mix - Usha Tai for 45 minutes, Remaining time 55 minutes.; Rajma Chawal and Madras Curry Powder - Rajiv for 35 minutes, Remaining time 55 minutes.; Chole Bhature and Advieh - Archana for 30 minutes, Remaining time 90 minutes.; Butter Chicken and Berbere - Nikki for 20 minutes, Remaining time 70 minutes.; Bedmi Puri with Aloo Sabji and Jeeravan Masala - Gaurav for 0 minutes, Remaining time, 120 minutes.; Contestants have to prepare their dish in their remaining time.: Round 3 Winner: Nikki Tamboli; Result: Nikki received immunity.
42	42	"Futuristic Challenge"	March 25, 2025
Black Apron Elimination Challenge: Mystery Box Challenge; Chef Kunal's Mystery Box: Australian Blood Lime as core ingredient. Prepare a dish in 120 minutes and with extensive support pantry.; Chef Ranveer's Mystery Box: Prepare a dish from 4 ingredients out of 9 available ingredients in 90 minutes.; Archana, Rajiv, and Gaurav choose Chef Kunal's Mystery Box.; Tejasswi and Usha Tai choose Chef Ranveer's Mystery Box.; Twist: In mid-challenge Farah opened her Mystery Box, contestants have to use Pressure Cooker.; Result: Usha Tai was eliminated from MasterChef Kitchen.
43	43	"Odisha Special Challenge"	March 26, 2025
Team Challenge: Prepare a Special Odisha Cuisine Platter.; Red Team: Nikki (Captain), Gaurav, Archana; Blue Team: Faisal (Captain), Tejasswi and Rajiv; Red Team - Odisha Temple Special Platter; Blue Team - Pakhala Platter; Challenge Winner: Red Team
44	44	"Aloo Superstar Challenge"	March 27, 2025
Skills Test: Prepare a Deep Fried Spiced Potato Accordion in 30 minutes.; Previous Challenge Winner Advantage: Nikki was exempted from challenge.; Challenge Winner: Faisal Sheikh
45	45	"Sai Seva Service Challenge"	March 28, 2025
Team Challenge: Prepare a thali for 500 Sai Baba devotees in 3 hours.; Usha Nadkarni returned as a guest and participated in the challenge.; Green Team: Tejasswi (Captain), Gaurav and Faisu; Blue Team: Rajiv (Captain), Archana, Nikki and Usha; Twist: Both teams get 4 professional helpers for challenge.; Result: Tie.
46	46	"Barter Challenge"	March 31, 2025
Nikki had to give away her immunity pin since she cannot use it anyway in Semifinale.; Barter Challenge: Each contestant received a box of ingredients belonging to a particular food category and have to barter their ingredients with another contestant. Contestants must barter at least once and prepare a dish using three ingredients from their final tray.; Twist: Farah brought her own tray of ingredients that she bartered with contestants.; Challenge Winner: Nikki Tamboli
47	47	"International Street Food Challenge"	April 1, 2025
Pair Challenge: Set up a food stall and prepare dishes with given cuisine in 120 minutes.; Pairs: Gaurav and Tejasswi, Archana and Rajiv, Nikki and Faisal; Cuisines: Gaurav and Tejasswi - Indonesian cuisine.; Archana and Rajiv - British cuisine.; Nikki and Faisu - Dutch cuisine.; Challenge Winner: Tejasswi and Gaurav earned the highest number of coins.; Result: Gaurav and Tejasswi become finalists.
48	48	"On Cloud Nine Challenge"	April 2, 2025
Black Apron Elimination Challenge: Replicate Chef Vikas Khanna's 'On Cloud Nine' dish in 120 minutes without recipe.
49	49	"Mystery Box Challenge By Chef Saransh Goila"	April 3, 2025
Bottom Dishes: Archana and Faisal; Result: Archana was eliminated from MasterChef Kitchen. Faisal, Nikki and Rajiv become finalists.; Mystery Box Challenge: Chef Saransh Goila gave each finalist a separate mystery box. Finalists have to prepare a dish in 120 minutes, and the pantry remains open entire time.; Faisu - Coal technique to prepare Ghevar.; Nikki - Chicken core ingredient and Dehydration technique.; Gaurav - Prepare Dessert with Syphon; Rajiv - Re-invent a Gujrati Sweet, Mohan Thaal by using Piping technique.; Tejasswi - Dried Shrimp core ingredient and emulsification technique.
50	50	"Mystery Box Challenge By Chef Saransh Goila - Part 2"	April 4, 2025
Ex contestants Usha, Archana and Abhijeet returned to the MasterChef Kitchen. Finalists can ask for their assistance for 5 minutes.; Challenge Winner: Gaurav
51	51	"Face Your Fears Challenge"	April 7, 2025
Skills Test: Munawar Faruqui challenged the finalists with their weakest ingredient.; Gaurav - Ginger; Faisal - Cheese; Nikki - Crab; Tejasswi - Red Chilli; Rajiv - Prepare savoury dish from Cherry; Previous Challenge Winner Advantage: Gaurav gets an additional 30 minutes—15 minutes each from two contestants he chose, Faisal and Tejasswi.; Challenge Winner: Gaurav
52	52	"Pressure Test by Chef Rahul Rana"	April 8, 2025
Replica Challenge: Replicate Chef Rahul Rana's dish 'Shadras', which comprises six dishes, 22 elements, and 150 steps in 150 minutes.; Previous Challenge Winner Advantage: Chef Rahul will complete 1/6th of the dish for Gaurav.; Top Dishes: Gaurav and Faisal; Challenge Winner: Faisal
53	53	"Celebrity Cooks vs Chefs"	April 9, 2025
Skills Test: The finalists competed with against professional chefs, Chef Gaurav Malhotra, Chef Ishijyot Suri and Chef Reena Samby. Chunky Panday appeared as the guest judge. There were 10 pantry boxes, each revealed at a specific time slot.; Staple Pantry - 100 minutes; Spices Pantry - 95 minutes.; Chef Ishijyot Suri.; Grains Pantry - 90 minutes; Aromatics Pantry - 85 minutes; Protein Pantry - 80 minutes.; Chef Reena Samby and Tejasswi.; Fruits Pantry - 75 minutes.; Faisal and Gaurav.; Alcohol Pantry - 70 minutes; Nuts and Seeds Pantry - 65 minutes; Sea Food Pantry - 60 minutes; Vegetables Pantry - 55 minutes.; Chef Gaurav Malhotra, Nikki and Rajiv, since no pantry left.; Prepare a dish with chosen pantry in their chosen pantry time. They also have access to all previously revealed pantries up to the one they selected.: Previous Challenge Winner Advantage: Faisal got access to all pantries.; Twist: If a professional chef’s dish wins, the contestant with the weakest dish will be eliminated.; Challenge Winner: Chef Gaurav and Nikki; Result: Since it was a tie, Chef Gaurav gave up his victory, resulting in no elimination.
54	54	"Two-Course Signature Meal Challenge - Grand Finale"	April 10, 2025
Grand Finale Challenge: Chef Sanjeev Kapoor challenged finalists to prepare their signature 2-course meal in 180 minutes.; Finalists have to present their first meal after 120 minutes.
55	55	"Two-Course Signature Meal Challenge - Grand Finale - Part 2"	April 11, 2025
Following the second meal tasting judges announced the results.; Eliminated: Faisal Shaikh and Rajiv Adati; Second Runner Up: Tejasswi Prakash; First Runner Up: Nikki Tamboli; Winner: Gaurav Khanna; Gaurav received 20 lakh cash prize from Sony Entertainment Television.

== Ratings ==
The show had an average TRP rating of 0.5 and underperformed overall. However, it maintained the third position in the channel’s ratings and performed well digitally on Sony LIV app.
