= MasterChef India – Hindi season 9 =

MasterChef India – Hindi
- Season 9
- Official Poster
- Hosted by: Paritosh Tripathi
- Judges: Kunal Kapur; Ranveer Brar; Vikas Khanna
- No. of contestants: 12 pairs (24 contestants)
- Winners: Ajinkya & Vikram Gandhe
- Runners-up: Chandana and Saisri Rachakonda
- No. of episodes: 45

Release
- Original network: Sony Entertainment Television; SonyLIV
- Original release: 5 January – 6 March 2026

Season chronology
- ← Previous; Season 8

Season 9 of the Indian Hindi language competitive reality TV series MasterChef India – Hindi premiered on Sony Entertainment Television on 5 January 2026. Vikas Khanna and Ranveer Brar returned as the judges for the show while Kunal Kapur returned for the first time as full-time judge since season 5.. For the first time, the contestants participated in pairs. Ajinkya and Vikram Gandhe from Nagpur won the season and Chandana and Saisri Rachakonda finished as Runner-ups. The season ended on 6 March 2026.

== Top 12 pairs ==
A large number of pairs appeared at the nationwide auditions, of which 25 pairs were selected by the judges.

The 25 pairs advanced to the overnight bootcamp titled as Agnipareeksha. The pairs would have to participate two challenges to get a spot in the top 12.

- Challenge 1 (The Great Indian Bread Basket): The 25 pairs will have to make 4 types of breads from India: Girda Roti, Khoba Roti, Malabar Parotta and Sel Roti. The first 18 pairs who makes all four perfect breads will go to the next challenge and remaining seven will be eliminated.
- Challenge 2 (Cook-Offs): The remaining 18 pairs will have to make a dish to win a spot in Top 12.

The top 12 pairs were revealed on 9 January 2026.

Contestants	Hometown	Relationship	Status	Place
Ajinkya and Vikram Gandhe	Nagpur, Maharashtra	Brothers	Winner on 06 March	1st
Chandana and Sai Sri Rachakonda	Hyderabad, Telangana	Mother-Daughter	1st Runner-Up on 06 March	2nd
Anju Pradhan and Manju Ojha	Puri, Odisha / Bhubaneswar, Odisha	Sisters	2nd Runner-Up on 06 March	3rd
Anshmeet Singh and Prabhdeep Kaur	Ludhiana, Punjab / Jalandhar, Punjab	Brother-Sister	Eliminated on 05 March	4th
Simran and Himanshi Vohra	Mathura, Uttar Pradesh	Sisters	Eliminated on 03 March	5th
Archana Dhotre and Rupalie Jadhav	Mumbai, Maharashtra	Sisters-in-law	Eliminated on 02 March	6th
Venu and Avani Sharma	Kasaragod, Kerala	Father-Daughter	Eliminated on 27 February	7th
Mahfooz and Yasmin Ansari	Bilaspur, Chhattisgarh / Ambikapur, Chhattisgarh	Brother-Sister	Eliminated on 20 February	8th
Deepali Bihani and Jamuna Somani	Mumbai, Maharashtra	Sisters	Eliminated on 13 February	9th
Parvati and Himang Soni	Bikaner, Rajasthan	Mother-Son	Eliminated on 06 February	10th
Vishnu and Harshini Purohit	Jhansi, Uttar Pradesh	Father-in-law and Daughter-in-law	Eliminated on 30 January	11th
Raksha and Kanchana Devi	Bir, Himachal Pradesh	Mother-in-law and Daughter-in-law	Eliminated; 23 January	12th

== Elimination chart ==
Place	Contestants	Episode																																		
Place	Contestants	Week 2				Week 3				Week 4				Week 5				Week 6				Week 7					Week 8					Week 9				
Place	Contestants	6	7-8	9	10	11	12	13-14	15	16	17-18	19	20	21	22-23	24	25	26	27-28	29	30	31	32	33	34	35	36	37	38	39	40	41	42	43	44	45
01	Ajinkya & Vikram	IN	WIN	IN	IN	IN	WIN	IMM		WIN	IMM			IN	IN	IN	IMM	PT	PT	PT	PT	IN	IN	IN	IN	PT	WIN	IN	HIGH	WIN	IMM	HIGH	WIN	IN	WIN	WINNER
02	Chandana & Sai Sri	IN	WIN	EXC		IN	IN	WIN	IMM	IN	IN	WIN	IMM	WIN	LOW	EXC	PT	PT	PT	PT	PT	IN	WIN	IMM			IN	LOW	IN	IN	PT	IN	IN	LOW	IN	RUNNER-UP
03	Anju & Manju	IN	WIN	IN	IN	IN	IN	LOW	PT	IN	WIN	LOW	PT	IN	IN	IN	IMM	PT	WIN	IMM		IN	IN	IN	IN	PT	IN	IN	IN	WIN	IMM	HIGH	IN	WIN	IN	THIRD
04	Anshmeet & Prabhdeep	IN	WIN	LOW	IN	IN	IN	LOW	PT	IN	IN	LOW	PT	IN	IN	IN	IMM	PT	PT	WIN	IMM	IN	IN	IN	IN	PT	IN	IN	IN	IN	PT	LOW	LOW	LOW	ELIM	
05	Simran & Himanshi	IN	WIN	EXC		IN	HIGH	LOW	PT	IN	WIN	WIN	IMM	IN	WIN	IN	IMM	PT	WIN	IMM		IN	HIGH	IN	IN	PT	IN	LOW	EXC	EXC	PT	IN	ELIM			
06	Archana & Rupali	HIGH	WIN	WIN	IN	HIGH	IN	WIN	IMM	IN	IN	WIN	IMM	LOW	IN	IN	IMM	PT	PT	WIN	IMM	IN	HIGH	HIGH	WIN	IMM	IN	IN	IN	WIN	IMM	ELIM				
07	Venu & Avani	IN	WIN	IN	IMN	IN	IN	WIN	IMM	HIGH	IN	LOW	PT	IN	IN	LOW	PT	PT	PT	PT	PIN	WIN	IN	IN	WIN	IMM	IN	IN	HIGH	IN	ELIM					
08	Mahfooz & Yasmin	WIN	WIN	IN	IN	IN	IN	WIN	IMM	IN	IN	WIN	IMM	IN	IN	IN	IMM	WIN	IMM			IN	IN	IN	IN	ELIM										
09	Deepali & Jamuna	IN	WIN	LOW	EXC	HIGH	IN	WIN	IMM	IN	IN	LOW	PT	IN	IN	LOW	PT	PT	PT	PT	ELIM															
10	Parvati & Himang	IN	LOW	EXC		WIN	IN	WIN	IMM	IN	IN	WIN	IMM	LOW	EXC		ELIM																			
11	Vishnu & Harshini	IN	LOW	EXC		IN	IN	LOW	PT	IN	IN	LOW	ELIM																							
12	Raksha & Kanchana	IN	LOW	EXC		WIN	IN	LOW	ELIM																											

(WINNER) The pair won the competition.
(RUNNER-UP) The pair finished as runner-up in the finals.
(THIRD) The pair placed third in the finals.
(WIN) The pair won an individual challenge.
(WIN) The pair won a team challenge.
(HIGH) The pair was one of the top entries in an individual challenge.
(HIGH) The pair was one of the top entries in a team challenge.
(IN) The pair wasn't selected as a top or bottom entry in an individual challenge.
(IN) The pair wasn't selected as a top or bottom entry in a team challenge.
(IN) The pair dish wasn’t tasted but advanced.
(LOW) The pair was one of the bottom entries in an individual challenge.
(LOW) The pair was one of the bottom entries in a team challenge.
(EXC) The pair was excluded from the challenge.
(IMM) The pair participated in the challenge but was safe from elimination.
(IMM) The pair didn't participate in the challenge as he/she had already advanced to the next week.
(IMM) The pair was saved via advantage and didn't have to compete in the challenge.
(IMN) The pair won an immunity pin in an Immunity pin challenge.
(PIN) The pair used an immunity pin to be exempted from the elimination challenge.
(PT) The pair competed in the black apron challenge in elimination round, and advanced.
(ELIM) The pair was eliminated from MasterChef Kitchen.

== Episodes ==
No.	Title	Directed by	Original release date
1	"Rishton Ka Sawad"	Soumyajit Roy	5 January 2026
Vikas Khanna, Ranveer Brar, and Kunal Kapur welcomed the contestants and introduced the season's new twist, with participants competing in pairs. In the audition round, pairs from different regions competed for a place in the competition. The episode focused on preliminary auditions held across multiple regions, including Mumbai, Punjab, Delhi, and Rajasthan, While no formal challenges were conducted, participants presented their dishes to the judges while the episode highlighted the personal stories of participants, including a chef from Bikaner advocating for women in cooking, a home cook from Maharashtra, and a father-daughter duo representing their community's cuisine.
2	"Swaad Ke Jaadu Ka Pitara"	Soumyajit Roy	6 January 2026
3	"Rishta Plate Mein"	Soumyajit Roy	7 January 2026
4	"Swaad Aur Rishton Ki Mithaas"	Soumyajit Roy	8 January 2026
5	"Agnee Pariksha"	Soumyajit Roy	9 January 2026
6	"Divine Mystery Box"	Soumyajit Roy	12 January 2026
7	"Anna Mahotsav"	Soumyajit Roy	13 January 2026
8	"Celebrating the Harvest Season"	Soumyajit Roy	14 January 2026
9	"Army Day Celebrations"	Soumyajit Roy	15 January 2026
10	"The Great Indian Mishtan"	Soumyajit Roy	16 January 2026
11	"Shaadi Ki Rasmein"	Soumyajit Roy	19 January 2026
12	"Haldi Aur Mehendi"	Soumyajit Roy	20 January 2026
13	"Shaadi Ka Shubh Muharat"	Soumyajit Roy	21 January 2026
14	"Baraatiyo Ka Swagat"	Soumyajit Roy	22 January 2026
15	"First Elimination Challenge By Chef Kunal Kapur"	Soumyajit Roy	23 January 2026
16	"Har Plate Mein India"	Soumyajit Roy	26 January 2026
17	"The Modak Challenge"	Soumyajit Roy	27 January 2026
18	"Reinventing Kapoor Family's Favourite Dishes"	Soumyajit Roy	28 January 2026
19	"Restaurant Takeover Challenge"	Soumyajit Roy	29 January 2026
20	"Pehla Pressure Test"	Soumyajit Roy	30 January 2026
21	"Organ Mystery Box"	Soumyajit Roy	2 February 2026
22	"Kitty Party Challenge"	Soumyajit Roy	3 February 2026
23	"Kitty Party Platter"	Soumyajit Roy	4 February 2026
24	"One Pot Challenge"	Soumyajit Roy	5 February 2026
25	"Cook Along Challenge"	Soumyajit Roy	6 February 2026
26	"No Gas, No Water Challenge"	Soumyajit Roy	9 February 2026
27	"7-Course Meal Team Challenge"	Soumyajit Roy	10 February 2026
28	"Seven Courses, One Verdict"	Soumyajit Roy	11 February 2026
29	"The Lucky Dip Challenge"	Soumyajit Roy	12 February 2026
30	"Blind Wall Elimination Challenge"	Soumyajit Roy	13 February 2026
31	"Childhood On A Plate Challenge"	Soumyajit Roy	16 February 2026
32	"Soch, Surat Aur Swaad"	Soumyajit Roy	17 February 2026
33	"Get-Set Chocolate"	Soumyajit Roy	18 February 2026
34	"Ghar Ka Khaana Adla Badli Challenge"	Soumyajit Roy	19 February 2026
35	"Potato Meets Different Cuisines"	Soumyajit Roy	20 February 2026
36	"Fire And Ice Mystery Box Challenge"	Soumyajit Roy	23 February 2026
37	"The Monsoon ASMR Challenge"	Soumyajit Roy	24 February 2026
38	"Tribute To Mumbai Challenge"	Soumyajit Roy	25 February 2026
39	"Get Set Mumbai"	Soumyajit Roy	26 February 2026
40	"Chausar Ka Khel"	Soumyajit Roy	27 February 2026

== Guests ==
Sl.No	Guests	Episode	Date
1	Shilpa Shetty	Episodes 7-8	13-14 January 2026
2	Col. Rajeev Bharwan, Lt Col. Kaushlendra Singh, Col. Kaushal Kashyap	Episode 9	15 January 2026
3	Yash Singh and Munna Maharaj	Episode 11	19 January 2026
4	Sanket Bhosale and Sugandha Mishra	Episode 12	20 January 2026
5	Chunky Panday and Bhavana Panday	Episodes 13-14	21-22 January 2026
6	Irina Rudakova and Agu Stanley	Episode 16	26 January 2026
7	Karisma Kapoor	Episode 17-18	27-28 January 2026
8	Acharya Manish	Episode 21	02 February 2026
9	Sunita Ahuja	Episode 22-23	03-04 February 2026
10	Neena Gupta and Sanjay Mishra	Episode 24	05 February 2026
11	Bindu Khanna, Surinder Kaur and Veena Kapur	Episode 31	16 February 2026
12	Sanjeev Kapoor	Episode 45	06 March 2026
