= MasterChef India – Hindi season 4 =

MasterChef India – Hindi
- Season 4
- Judges: Vikas Khanna; Sanjeev Kapoor; Ranveer Brar
- No. of contestants: 12
- Winner: Nikita Gandhi
- Runners-up: Neha Deepak Shah; Bhakti Arora
- No. of episodes: 67

Release
- Original network: Star Plus
- Original release: 26 January – 12 April 2015

Season chronology
- Next → Season 5

Season 4 of the Indian Hindi-language competitive reality TV series MasterChef India – Hindi on Star Plus on 26 January 2015 and aired from Monday through Saturday at 10:30 pm IST.

Vikas Khanna and Sanjeev Kapoor returned as judges while Kunal Kapur was replaced by Ranveer Brar.

21-year-old student Nikita Gandhi, who is a non-resident Indian and person of Indian origin, was announced as the winner on 12 April 2015. Neha Deepak Shah and Bhakti Arora were the first and second runner-ups respectively.

== Format ==
From nationwide auditions, the judges picked 12 home cooks that advanced to the main competition. Unlike the other seasons, this season was exclusively focused on vegetarian cooking alone.

== Top 12 ==
The top 12 contestants were revealed on 7 February 2015.

| Contestant | Age | Hometown | Occupation | Status |
|---|---|---|---|---|
| Nikita Gandhi | 21 | Abu Dhabi, U.A.E. | Student | Winner 12 April |
| Neha Deepak Shah | 24 | Delhi | Flavourist | 1st runner-up 12 April |
| Bhakti Arora | 30 | Hyderabad, Telangana | Housewife | 2nd runner-up 12 April; Returned 21 March; Eliminated 19 March |
| Ashish Singh | 35 | Ambala, Haryana | Food Stall Owner | Eliminated 11 April |
| Karishma Sakhrani | 27 | Mumbai, Maharashtra | Media Professional | Eliminated 9 April |
| Vijay Sharma | 27 | Baloda Bazar, Chhattisgarh | Electrician | Eliminated 7 April |
| Pratibha Kochhar | 39 | Jaipur, Rajasthan | Stay-at-Home Mom | Eliminated 6 April |
| Meenu Dham | 54 | Nashik, Maharashtra | Stay-at-Home Mom | Eliminated 24 March; Returned 21 March; Eliminated 14 March |
| Drishti Nanda | 23 | Amritsar, Punjab | Home Baker | Eliminated 7 March |
| Priyanka Mallick | 34 | Delhi | Stay-at-Home Mom | Eliminated 28 February |
| Vinita Kaner | 28 | Delhi | Housewife | Eliminated 21 February |
| Harman Singh | 18 | Kuwait | High School Student | Eliminated 14 February |
