= MasterChef India – Hindi =

Indian cooking reality television series

- Genre: Reality; Cookery
- Created by: Franc Roddam
- Based on: MasterChef
- Judges: see judges
- Country of origin: India
- Original language: Hindi
- No. of seasons: 9
- No. of episodes: 336

Production
- Running time: 46–48 minutes
- Production company: Endemol Shine India

Original release
- Network: Star Plus (seasons 1–6); Sony Entertainment Television (season 7, 9); SonyLIV (season 8)
- Release: 16 October 2010 – present

Related
- Celebrity MasterChef India; Junior MasterChef; MasterChef India – Tamil; MasterChef India – Telugu

MasterChef India – Hindi (or colloquially MasterChef Hindi; formerly MasterChef India) is an Indian Hindi-language competitive cooking reality television series based on MasterChef Australia and is part of MasterChef India. The series features amateur and home chefs competing to win the title of 'MasterChef'. The current line-up of judges consists of Vikas Khanna, Kunal Kapur, and Ranveer Brar.

== Format ==
MasterChef is based on the Australian series MasterChef. The competition takes place in the MasterChef soundstage located in Mumbai, India which includes a large kitchen area with several cooking stations which is overlooked by a balcony, a well-stocked pantry, a freezer/fridge area and a fine-dining restaurant/seating dining area room used for certain challenges.

While the particular format of the season has slightly varied over the years, the following challenges have all been regularly featured:

- Skills Test: Cooks are challenged to perform a list of common cooking techniques or styles, or to replicate a particular cooking method of a dish (i.e. steaks done to an exact wellness). This type of test is also sometimes used as an Elimination Test.
- Mystery Box: Cooks are given a box with the same ingredients and they must use only those ingredients to create a dish within a fixed amount of time. The judges will select three dishes based on visual appearance, its taste and how well the contestants have used the given ingredient. The person who fulfils these three criteria will gain an advantage.
- Elimination Test: After the challenge is explained, judges evaluate all dishes based on taste and visual appeal. The judges give feedback of every dish and nominate the least pleasant dish for elimination.
- Team Challenge: The cooks are split into teams by either team captains or the judges. These challenges take place in a restaurant or pop-up restaurant taking the place of the staff of a particular restaurant. Guests taste both meals and vote for their favorite. The winning team advances, while the losing team will participate in the Pressure Test or face elimination based on the teams' performance.
- Pressure Test: Another form of the Elimination Test, in which losing team members compete against each other to make a standard dish within a very limited amount of time that requires a great degree of cooking finesse. Each dish is judged on taste, visual appeal and technique, and the losing chef is eliminated.

Once the competition is reduced the finalists will compete against each other in a three-course cook-off. All courses of the meal are judged and an overall winner is crowned. The winner of seventh season won ₹ 25,00,000, a MasterChef trophy, and the title of MasterChef. Some seasons have also added other prizes such as a cookbook deal.

== Judges and host ==
Judges	Season 1	Season 2	Season 3	Juniors MasterChef	Season 4	Season 5	Season 6	Season 7	Season 8	Celebrity MasterChef	Season 9
Ajay Chopra	Judge	Judge									
Akshay Kumar	Judge										
Farah Khan										Host	
Farah Khan										Judge	
Garima Arora								Judge			
Kunal Kapur	Judge	Judge	Judge	Judge		Judge					Judge
Paritosh Tripathi											Host
Pooja Dhingra									Judge		
Ranveer Brar					Judge		Judge	Judge	Judge	Judge	Judge
Sanjeev Kapoor			Judge		Judge						
Surjan Singh Jolly				Judge							
Vikas Khanna		Judge	Judge	Judge	Judge	Judge	Judge	Judge	Judge	Judge	Judge
Vineet Bhatia							Judge				
Zorawar Kalra						Judge					

== Series overview ==
MasterChef

Season	Primary Network	Online VOD	No. of episodes	First Aired	Last Aired	Prize money	Winner	Runner-up
1	StarPlus	—	21	16 October 2010	25 December 2010	₹1 crore	Pankaj Bhadouria	Jayanandan Bhaskar
2	StarPlus	—	22	22 October 2011	1 January 2012	₹1 crore	Shipra Khanna	Salma Shazia Fathima
3	StarPlus	—	70	11 March 2013	9 June 2013	₹1 crore	Ripudaman Handa	Navneet Rastogi
4	StarPlus	—	67	26 January 2015	12 April 2015	₹1 crore	Nikita Gandhi	Neha Deepak Shah
5	StarPlus	—	26	1 October 2016	25 December 2016	₹50 lakh	Kirti Bhoutika	Ashima Arora
6	StarPlus	—	25	7 December 2019	1 March 2020	₹25 lakh	Abinas Nayak	Oindrila Bala
7	Sony Entertainment Television	SonyLIV	65	2 January 2023	31 March 2023	₹25 lakh	Nayanjyoti Saikia	Shanta Sarmah
8	—	SonyLIV	40	16 October 2023	8 December 2023	₹25 lakh	Mohammad Ashiq	Nambie Marak
9	Sony Entertainment Television	SonyLIV	45	5 January 2026	6 March 2026	₹25 lakh	Ajinkya and Vikram Gandhe	Chandana and Saisri Rachakonda

Junior MasterChef

Season	Primary Network	Online VOD	No. of episodes	First Aired	Last Aired	Prize money	Winner	Runner-up
1	StarPlus	—N/a	22	17 August 2013	2 November 2013	₹25 lakh	Sarthak Bhardwaj	Sakshi Tripathi

Celebrity MasterChef

Season	Primary Network	Online VOD	No. of episodes	First Aired	Last Aired	Prize money	Winner	Runner-up
1	Sony Entertainment Television	SonyLIV	55	27 January 2025	11 April 2025	₹20 lakh	Gaurav Khanna	Nikki Tamboli

=== Season 1 (2010) ===
MasterChef India 1 aired from 16 October 2010 to 25 December 2010 on StarPlus. Hosted by Akshay Kumar, Kunal Kapur and Ajay Chopra, it was won by Pankaj Bhadouria.

=== Season 2 (2011) ===
MasterChef India 2 aired from 22 October 2011 to 1 January 2012 on StarPlus. Hosted by Vikas Khanna, Kunal Kapur and Ajay Chopra, it was won by Shipra Khanna. Nita Mehta and Bijou Thaangjam also participated in the program.

=== Season 3 (2013) ===
MasterChef India 3 aired from 11 March 2013 to 9 June 2013 on StarPlus. While the previous seasons were on weekends, this season aired during weekdays. Hosted by Vikas Khanna, Kunal Kapur and Sanjeev Kapoor, it was won by Ripudaman Handa.

=== Season 4 (2015) ===
MasterChef India 4 aired from 26 January 2015 to 12 April 2015 on StarPlus. For the first time in the history of MasterChef, a pure vegetarian format was introduced. Hosted by Sanjeev Kapoor, Vikas Khanna and Ranveer Brar, Written by Gunjan Joshi, it was won by Nikita Gandhi.

=== Season 5 (2016) ===
MasterChef India 5 aired from 1 October 2016 to 25 December 2016 on StarPlus. Hosted by Vikas Khanna, Kunal Kapur and Zorawar Kalra. Kirti Bhoutika won the competition, with Ashima Arora finishing in the second place.

=== Season 6 (2019) ===
MasterChef India 6 aired from 7 December 2019 to 1 March 2020 on StarPlus. Hosted by Vikas Khanna, Ranveer Brar and Vineet Bhatia, Written by Gunjan Joshi. The winner was Abinas Nayak, with Oindrila Bala as the runner-up.

=== Season 7 (January - March 2023) ===
The seventh season of the Hindi version of MasterChef India was announced on August 5, 2022, hosted by the judges Vikas Khanna, Ranveer Brar and Garima Arora. It aired from 2 January 2023 to 31 March 2023 on SET and was also streamed on SonyLIV. The winner was Nayanjyoti Saikia, who got prize money of ₹25,00,000 and the first runner-up was Santa Sarmah and second runner-up was Suvarna Bagul. They both got prize money of ₹5,00,000.

After the finale of season 7, it was revealed that a spinoff would premier, titled "MasterChef India - MasterClass". The show will feature the same judges and contestants as the 7th season of MasterChef, but instead the judges will cook for the contestants, teaching them skills and recipes.

=== Season 8 (October - December 2023) ===
The eighth season of the Hindi version of MasterChef India was announced on 7 July 2023, hosted by the judges Pooja Dhingra, Vikas Khanna and Ranveer Brar. It premiered exclusively on SonyLIV from 16 October to 8 December 2023. The winner of this season was Mohammed Ashiq from Mangalore.

=== Season 9 (2026) ===
The ninth season of the Hindi version of MasterChef India was announced in October 2025, hosted by the judges Vikas Khanna, Ranveer Brar and Kunal Kapur. It started airing from 5 January 2026 on SET and also streaming on SonyLIV. For the first time, The contestants participated in pairs. the winner of this season was Ajinkya and Vikram Gandhe from Nagpur

== Spin-offs ==
=== Junior MasterChef India ===
Junior MasterChef India premiered on 17 August 2013 on StarPlus. This was the first and the only season of the junior spin-off. The season was won by Sarthak Bhardwaj in the finale held on 2 November 2013.

=== Celebrity MasterChef ===
Celebrity MasterChef premiered on Sony Entertainment Television on 27 January 2025. Farah Khan, for the first time, joined as the host of the show. Vikas Khanna and Ranveer Brar reprised their role as judges from the original series. The season was won by Gaurav Khanna on 11 April 2025.

== Production ==
In 2010, Star India licensed the rights for producing MasterChef India in Hindi.

== Reception ==
Season 1 opened with an average ratings of 2.6 TVR. The following week, it garnered 2.5 TVR. Overall it ranged around over 2 and 3 TVR. The finale garnered the highest viewership rating of 4.2 TVR.

Season 2 premiered with 2.01 TVR and ended with 2.6 TVR.

Season 3 opened with 2.2 TVR while the following weeks garnered a decent ratings between 2 and 2.3 TVR the finale became the most watched reality show of the week with 3.7 TVR.

Season 6 garnered low ratings ranging 0.8 and 1.1 TRP.
