= MasterChef India – Hindi season 5 =

MasterChef India – Hindi
- Season 5
- Judges: Vikas Khanna; Kunal Kapur; Zorawar Kalra
- No. of contestants: 16
- Winner: Kirti Bhoutika
- Runner-up: Ashima Arora
- No. of episodes: 26

Release
- Original network: Star Plus
- Original release: 1 October – 25 December 2016

Season chronology
- ← Previous; Season 4 Next → Season 6

Season 5 of the Indian Hindi-language competitive reality TV series MasterChef India – Hindi premiered on Star Plus on 1 October 2016.

Vikas Khanna returned to judge this season while Sanjeev Kapoor and Ranveer Brar were replaced by Kunal Kapur and Zorawar Kalra respectively.

The winner was Kirti Bhoutika, a 20-year-old Nutrition graduate, with Ashima Arora being the runner-up.

== Format ==
Top 30 contestants were chosen from India and even from the other parts of the world like San Francisco, London, etc. From the Top 30, Best 10 were chosen by a cook-off between 3 each and in the second-chance cook, 6 other were chosen.

== Top 16 ==
Contestant	Age	Hometown	Occupation	Status	Winnings
Kirti Bhoutika	20	Kolkata, West Bengal	Bakery Owner	Winner 25 December	7
Ashima Arora	23	Amritsar, Punjab	Cake Artist	Runner-Up 25 December	6
Dinesh Patel	21	London, United Kingdom	Lawyer	Eliminated 24 December	6
Mirvaan Vinayak	19	Faridabad, Haryana	Actor	Eliminated 24 December	7
Samantha Barrett	27	Dehradun, Uttarakhand	Cafe Owner	Eliminated 18 December	7
Anagha Godbole	44	San Francisco, California	Senior Product Manager	Eliminated 18 December	6
Siddharth Talwar	46	Noida, Uttar Pradesh	MNC Vice President	Eliminated 4 December	1
Jatin Khurana	24	Ludhiana, Punjab	Telecommunication Manager	Eliminated 27 November	2
Syed Sadaf Hussain	27	Ranchi, Jharkhand	Social Sector Manager	Eliminated 20 November	3
Ajay Kumar Siotra	24	Jammu	Tourism Student	Eliminated 13 November	2
Pradip Bhawalkar	69	Pune, Maharashtra	Engineer	Eliminated 6 November	2
Rohini Chawla	36	Gurugram, Haryana	Housewife	Withdrew 5 November	2
Sreelakshmi N. Prabhu	37	Kochi, Kerala	Housewife	Eliminated 30 October	0
Abhilasha Chandak	29	Purulia, West Bengal	Homemaker	Eliminated 23 October	0
Shipra Chenji	35	Meerut, Uttar Pradesh	Interior Designer	Eliminated 16 October	0
Ashwin Iyer	37	Bangalore, Karnataka	Food Blogger	Eliminated 9 October	0

== Elimination Table ==
Place	Contestant	Episode																																			
Place	Contestant	2		3	4	5	6	7		8	9	10	11		12	13	14		15			16		17	18		19		20	21	22		23		24	25	26
1	Kirti	IN	IN	BTM	PT	IN	SAFE	WIN	SAFE	SAFE	WIN	SAFE	TOP	WIN	SAFE	TOP	WEAK	SAFE	LOSE			WIN	SAFE	IN	BTM	PT	TOP	BTM	PT	WIN	IN	WIN	SAFE			TOP	WINNER
2	Ashima	TOP	WEAK	WEAK	SAFE	WIN	SAFE	WIN	SAFE	SAFE	LOSE	PT	TOP	IN	SAFE	WIN	SAFE	SAFE	LOSE			WIN	SAFE	IN	WIN	SAFE	IN	BTM	PT	LOSE			TOP	TOP	WIN	TOP	RUNNER-UP
3	Dinesh	WIN	WEAK	IN	SAFE	WIN	SAFE	IN	BTM	PT	LOSE	PT	TOP	WIN	SAFE	WIN	SAFE	SAFE	WIN	IN	IN	LOSE	PT	IN	IN	SAFE	TOP	IN	SAFE	WIN	TOP	IN	WIN	SAFE		ELIM	
3	Mirvaan	IN	IN	IN	SAFE	LOSE	PT	IN	IN	SAFE	LOSE	PT	IN	WIN	SAFE	IN	IN	SAFE	WIN	WEAK		LOSE	PT	WIN	SAFE	SAFE	WIN	SAFE	SAFE	WIN	OUT		IN	WIN	SAFE	ELIM	
5	Samantha	TOP	IN	IN	SAFE	LOSE	PT	TOP	WIN	SAFE	LOSE	PT	IN	WIN	SAFE	TOP	WIN	SAFE	WIN	TOP	WIN	WIN	SAFE	WIN	SAFE	SAFE	IN	IN	SAFE	LOSE			IN	IN	ELIM		
5	Anagha	TOP	WIN	SAFE	SAFE	IN	SAFE	IN	IN	SAFE	WIN	SAFE	WIN	SAFE	SAFE	IN	IN	SAFE	WIN	IN	IN	WIN	SAFE	IN	WEAK	SAFE	IN	IN	SAFE	LOSE			IN	WEAK	ELIM		
7	Siddharth	IN	TOP	WEAK	SAFE	LOSE	PT	IN	BTM	PT	WIN	SAFE	IN	BTM	PT	IN	BTM	PT	LOSE			LOSE	PT	IN	BTM	PT	IN	BTM	ELIM								
8	Jatin	IN	IN	WIN	SAFE	IN	SAFE	TOP	WIN	SAFE	LOSE	PT	IN	IN	SAFE	IN	IN	SAFE	LOSE			LOSE	PT	IN	BTM	ELIM											
9	Sadaf	IN	IN	WIN	SAFE	WIN	SAFE	IN	IN	SAFE	WIN	SAFE	IN	BTM	PT	IN	IN	SAFE	LOSE			LOSE	ELIM														
10	Ajay	TOP	IN	IN	SAFE	WIN	SAFE	IN	IN	SAFE	LOSE	PT	WIN	SAFE	SAFE	TOP	BTM	ELIM																			
11	Pradip	IN	TOP	IN	SAFE	WIN	SAFE	IN	IN	SAFE	WIN	SAFE	IN	BTM	ELIM																						
12	Rohini	IN	IN	IN	SAFE	IN	SAFE	TOP	WIN	SAFE	WIN	SAFE	IN	WDR																							
13	Shreelakshmi	IN	IN	IN	PT	LOSE	PT	IN	IN	SAFE	LOSE	ELIM																									
14	Abhilasha	IN	IN	IN	SAFE	IN	SAFE	IN	BTM	ELIM																											
15	Shipra	IN	IN	BTM	PT	LOSE	ELIM																														
16	Ashwin	IN	BTM		ELIM																																

(WINNER) This cook won the competition.
(RUNNER-UP) This cook finished in second place.
(WIN) The cook(s) won the individual / pair challenge (Mystery Box Challenge or Invention Test or Elimination Test).
(WIN) The cook was on the winning team in the Team Challenge and directly advanced to the next round.
(TOP) The cook was one of the top entries in the individual challenge but didn't win.
(WIN) The cook won the Ticket to Finale Challenge and was directly promoted as a finalist.
(SAFE) The cook didn't participate in the challenge as he/she already advanced into the next round.
(IN) The cook wasn't selected as a top or bottom entry in an individual / pair challenge.
(IN) The cook wasn't selected as a top or bottom entry in a team challenge.
(PT) The cook competed in the Elimination Test or Pressure Test (was on the losing team in the Team Challenge), and advanced.
(LOSE) The cook was on the losing team in the Team Challenge and had to compete in the upcoming Pressure Test.
(WEAK) The cook was one of the bottom entries in an individual challenge.
(BTM) The cook was one of the bottom entries in an individual challenge, and had to compete in the upcoming Elimination test.
(WDR) The cook withdrew from the competition due to illness or personal reasons.
(ELIM) The cook was eliminated from MasterChef.

== Episodes ==
No. in season	Title	Original release date
1	"A Royal Spread"	1 October 2016
2	"First Mystery Box Challenge and Invention Test"	2 October 2016
3	"Team Work Challenge"	8 October 2016
4	"First Elimination / Pressure Test"	9 October 2016
5	"First Team Challenge"	15 October 2016
6	"Second Elimination / Pressure Test and Immunity Pin Challenge"	16 October 2016
Guest Chef: Sahil Singh
7	"Second Mystery Box and Tag-Team Challenge"	22 October 2016
8	"Third Elimination / Pressure Test"	23 October 2016
Guest Chef: Srijith Gopinathan
9	"Second Team Challenge"	29 October 2016
10	"Fourth Elimination / Pressure Test"	30 October 2016
Guest Chef: Sanjana Patel
11	"Third Mystery Box and Pair Challenge"	5 November 2016
Special Guests: Shakti Mohan and Raghav Juyal
12	"Fifth Elimination / Pressure Test"	6 November 2016
13	"Fourth Mystery Box Challenge and Pair Challenge"	12 November 2016
Special Guest: Bipasha Basu
14	"Cook-Along Challenge"	13 November 2016
Guest Chef: Anahita Dhondy
15	"Team Cheese Quiz and Second Invention Test"	19 November 2016
16	"Third Team Challenge and Sixth Elimination / Pressure Test"	20 November 2016
Special Guest: Sushil Kumar; Guest Chef: Abhijit Saha
17	"Fourth Team Challenge and Fifth Mystery Box Challenge"	26 November 2016
18	"Seventh Elimination / Pressure Test"	27 November 2016
Guest Chef: Nooror Somany Steppe
19	TBA	3 December 2016
Special Guests: Ranveer Singh and Vaani Kapoor
20	"Eighth Elimination / Pressure Test"	4 December 2016
Special Guest: Vidya Balan
21	"Fifth Team Challenge"	10 December 2016
22	"Ticket to Finale: Part 1 (Sixth Mystery Box Challenge)" "Ticket to Finale Challenge: Part 2"	11 December 2016
23	"The Semifinals: Part 1 (Seventh Mystery Box Challenge)" "The Semifinals: Part 2"	17 December 2016
Guest Chef: Matt Preston
24	"The Semifinals: Part 3"	18 December 2016
Special Guest: Matthew Hayden
25	"The Grand Finale: Part 1"	24 December 2016
Guest Chef: Atul Kochhar
26	"The Grand Finale: Part 2"	25 December 2016
Special Guest: Sonakshi Sinha
