= MasterChef India – Hindi season 8 =

MasterChef India – Hindi
- Season 8
- Judges: Pooja Dhingra; Ranveer Brar; Vikas Khanna
- No. of contestants: 12
- Winner: Mohammed Ashiq
- Runner-up: Nambie Marak
- No. of episodes: 40

Release
- Original network: SonyLIV
- Original release: 16 October – 8 December 2023

Season chronology
- ← Previous; Season 7 Next → Season 9

Season 8 of the Indian Hindi language competitive reality TV series MasterChef India – Hindi premiered on SonyLIV on 16 October 2023. Vikas Khanna and Ranveer Brar returned as the judges for the show while Garima Arora was replaced by Pooja Dhingra. Mohammed Ashiq from Mangalore won the season and Nambie Marak finished as runner up.

== Top 12 ==
A large number of home cooks appeared at the nationwide auditions, of which 22 cooks were selected by the judges and welcomed at the MasterChef Kitchen. They competed in a cook-off to win the final 12 spots. The Top 12 contestants were revealed on 20 October 2023

Contestant	Age	Hometown	Occupation	Status	Place
Mohammed Ashiq	24	Mangalore, Karnataka	Entrepreneur	Winner on 08 December, 2023	1st
Nambie Marak	35	Upper Rangsa, Meghalaya	School Principal	Runner-Up on 08 December, 2023	2nd
Dr. Rukhsaar Sayeed	33	Pampore, J&K	Food Technician	Third place on 08 December, 2023	3rd
Suraj Thapa	28	Chalsa, West Bengal	Home Baker	Fourth place on 08 December, 2023	4th
Harish Closepet	58	Bengaluru, Karnataka	Entrepreneur	Eliminated on 05 December, 2023	5th
Nidhi Sharma	35	Solan, Himachal Pradesh	Chief Bank Manager	Eliminated on 04 December, 2023	6th
Kriti Dhiman	23	Mandi Gobindgarh, Punjab	Home Baker	Eliminated on 01 December, 2023	7th
Kenneth Gopinath	18	Bengaluru, Karnataka	Student	Eliminated on 24 November 2023	8th
Subhojit Sen	29	Kolkata, West Bengal	Engineer	Eliminated on 17 November 2023	9th
Prachi Agarkar	28	Mumbai, Maharashtra	Professor	Eliminated on 10 November 2023	10th
Kaushalya Choudhary	29	Bhopalgarh, Rajasthan	Content Creator	Eliminated on 3 November 2023	11th
Sima Ahmed	56	Faizabad, Uttar Pradesh	Pop-up Chef	Eliminated on 3 November 2023	11th

== Elimination chart ==
Place	Contestant	Episode																												
Place	Contestant	Week 2 (Note: Immunity pin challenge.)				Week 3				Week 4				Week 5				Week 6				Week 7				Week 8				
Place	Contestant	6	7	8-9	10	11	12	13-14	15	16	17-18	19	20	21-22	23	24	25	26	27	28-29	30	31	32	33-34	35	36	37	38-39	40	
1	Ashiq	IN	TOP	IN	IN	TOP	IN	BTM	PT	IN	LOW	BTM	PT	WIN	WIN	IMM		IN	IN	BTM	PT	IN	LOW	BTM	PT	TOP 5	TOP 4	TOP 4	TOP 3	WINNER
2	Nambie	IN	IN	IN	IN	IN	WIN	IMM (Note: Nambie was immune but participated in the challenge.)	IMM	IN	WIN	IMM		LOW	NOT	WIN	IMM	IN	IN	WIN	IMM	IN	WIN	WIN	IMM	TOP 5	TOP 4	TOP 4	TOP 3	RUNNER UP
3	Rukhsaar	IN	IN	IN	IMN	IN	IN	BTM	PT	WIN	WIN	IMM		WIN	IN	BTM	PT (Note: Rukhsaar used her Immunity pin.)	IN	IN	WIN	IMM	IN	WIN	TOP	PT	TOP 5	TOP 4	TOP 4	TOP 3	THIRD
4	Suraj	IN	IN	IN	IN	IN	IN	BTM	PT	IN	WIN	IMM		WIN	IN	WIN	IMM	IN	IN	WIN	IMM	IN	WIN	BTM	PT	TOP 5	TOP 4	TOP 4	ELIM	FOURTH
5	Harish	IN	IN	LOW	NOT	IN	IN	TOP	IMM	IN	LOW	WIN	IMM	WIN	IN	WIN	IMM	IN	IN	BTM	PT	IN	LOW	BTM	PT	TOP 5	ELIM			
6	Nidhi	IN	TOP	LOW	NOT	BTM	IN	WIN	IMM	WIN	LOW	BTM	PT	WIN	IN	BTM	PT	IN	IN	BTM	PT	IN	LOW	BTM	PT	ELIM				
7	Kriti	IN	IN	IN	IN	IN	IN	BTM	PT	IN	WIN	IMM		WIN	IN	BTM	PT	IN	BTM	NOT	PT	BTM	NOT		ELIM					
8	Kenneth	IN	IN	LOW	NOT	IN	IN	BTM	PT	IN	WIN	IMM		LOW	NOT	WIN	IMM	BTM	NOT		ELIM									
9	Subhojit	LOW	NOT			IN	IN	BTM	PT	IN	LOW	BTM	PT	LOW	NOT	BTM	ELIM													
10	Prachi	LOW	NOT			IN	IN	TOP	IMM	IN	LOW	BTM	ELIM																	
11	Kaushalya	IN	LOW	NOT		IN	IN	BTM	ELIM																					
11	Sima	IN	LOW	NOT		BTM	IN	BTM	ELIM																					

(WINNER) The cook won the competition.
(RUNNER-UP) The cook finished as the Runner-up.
(TOP) The cook was one of the top entries in the individual challenge.
(WIN) The cook won an individual / pair / team challenge.
(IN) The cook wasn't selected as a top or bottom entry in an individual / pair challenge.
(LOW) The cook was one of the bottom entries in an individual / pair / team challenge.
(BTM) The cook was non-immune and had to compete in the elimination challenge.
(PT) The cook competed in the Pressure Test in elimination round, and advanced.
(IMM) The cook didn't participate in the challenge as he/she already advanced to the next week.
(IMN) The cook won an Immunity Pin.
(NOT) This cook did not participate in the challenge(s) as was excluded.
(ELIM) The cook was eliminated from the MasterChef Kitchen.

== Production ==
The MasterChef India season 8 was announced on 7 July 2023 on SonyLIV. This season marked Khanna's seventh consecutive season serving as a judge on the show, Brar's fourth season and Dhingra's first season as a judge. Audition rounds were conducted across the country. The Times of India reviewed the series.
