= Zorawar Kalra =

Indian restaurateur

- Born: 26 May 1977 (age 49); New Delhi, India
- Education: Bentley Business University, Boston
- Occupation: Indian Restaurateur
- Known for: Masala Library; Made In Punjab; Farzi Cafe/Farzi beach goa Pa Pa Ya; Masala Bar; KODE; BBQ'D; Rivers TO Oceans(R2O); BO-TAI; YOUNION; TYGR; Mithai By Jiggs Kalra; Hotel ShangHigh; BO-TAI Switch +94 Bombay; Swan; Butter Delivery; Louis Burgers; Legacy (Luxury Catering) Upcoming Ventures: Slyce (Pizza Delivery); Biryani by Jiggs Kalra
- Spouse: Dildeep Kalra
- Parent: Jiggs Kalra

Zorawar Kalra (born 26 May 1977) is an Indian restaurateur. He is the son of Jiggs Kalra, the ‘Czar of Indian Cuisine’. He is the founder and managing director of Massive Restaurants Pvt Ltd, which owns brands such as Masala Library, Pa Pa Ya, Farzi Café, Made in Punjab and unique Asian eatery called Hotel ShangHigh. He hosted season five of MasterChef India, replacing Sanjeev Kapoor.

== Career ==
With a family backdrop immersed in restaurants, food was always at the centre of family life while Zorawar Kalra was growing up in New Delhi. Taking the lead from his father, his first entrepreneurial venture, ZK Restaurant Concepts, was launched in 2006, followed by a number of successful casual and fine dining restaurants. Six years later, born out of a belief that every effort should be made to elevate the position of Indian cuisine across the globe, he founded Massive Restaurants. Kalra now has 26 restaurants across nine brands in eight countries.

== Television ==
In 2016, Kalra hosted the fifth season of MasterChef India, a series based on the original British version, MasterChef, alongside Vikas Khanna and Kunal Kapur.

Brands owned by Kalra are Masala Library, Made In Punjab, Farzi Cafe, Pa Pa Ya, Masala Bar, KODE, BBQ'D, Rivers TO Oceans, BO-TAI, YOUNION, TYGR, Mithai By Jiggs Kalra, Hotel ShangHigh, BO-TAI Switch, +94 Bombay, Swan, Butter Delivery and Louis Burgers.

In July 2022, Kalra announced his decision to participate in dance-based reality show Jhalak Dikhhla Jaa 10.

== Filmography ==
=== Television ===
| Year | Title | Role | Notes | Ref. |
|---|---|---|---|---|
| 2016 | MasterChef India 5 | Host | | |
| 2022–present | Jhalak Dikhhla Jaa 10 | Contestant | 13th place | |
