= Sapat =

Sapat Logo

Sapat Group, also known as Sapat, is a diversified corporate conglomerate headquartered in Mumbai, India.

== History ==
Sapat was established in the year 1897 by Mr. Ramashankar Haribhai Joshi. Its products include Tea, OTC drugs and personal care products. It started with Sapat Lotion, its first OTC product followed by a foray into the tea industry, resulting in the introduction of Sapat Chai, Sapat is ranked among the top 10 packaged tea companies in India.

Sapat introduces Parivar Chai. The company made headlines in the marketing community through the use of the youth called CAs (communication agents), who played the role of brand ambassadors in their villages. This made Sapat one of the fastest growing tea brands in India.

The Company decided to foray into real-estate and organized retail. Sapat fresh loose tea stores were opened up, by expanding the business through franchising. Sapat sets up to expand its tea brands with a new look to Parivar Chai and a significant expansion of distribution.

Sapat launches ChaiTime, a range of Indian flavored teas in association with Chef Sanjeev Kapoor.
