= Junior MasterChef (Indian TV series) =

- Official logo of the series
- Genre: Cooking
- Starring: Vikas Khanna; Kunal Kapur; Surjan Singh Jolly
- Country of origin: India
- Original language: Hindi
- No. of seasons: 1
- No. of episodes: 22

Production
- Production location: Mumbai

Original release
- Network: Star Plus
- Release: 17 August – 2 November 2013

Junior MasterChef - Swaad Ke Ustaad is the Indian Hindi-language version of Junior MasterChef. It aired on 17 August 2013 and ended on 2 November 2013.

The judges for the show were Vikas Khanna, Kunal Kapur and Chef Jolly.

Sarthak Bhardwaj of Dehradun was the winner of this show.

== Format ==
Ten contestants ages 9–12 were chosen to participate. The auditions process began as MasterChef India – Hindi 3 concluded.

The Top 10 contestants were also taken to Adlabs Imagica theme park to celebrate.

== Contestants ==
Name	Age	Hometown	Status	Place
Sarthak; Bhardwaj	12	Dehradun	Winner	1st
Sakshi; Tripathi	9	Lucknow	Runner-Up	2nd
Emanuel; Chauhan	9	Mumbai	Eliminated	3rd
Devendra; Singh	12	Jaipur	Eliminated	4th
Harshika; Doshi	9	Kolkata	Eliminated	5th
Pammi; Singh	11	Kolkata	Eliminated	6th
Roshan; Shaw	12	Dhanbad	Eliminated	7th
Sanya; Raheja	10	New Delhi	Eliminated	8th
Khyati; Hari	11	Mussoorie	Eliminated	9th
Arvin Navin; Thattil	8	Kerala	Eliminated	10th
Soham; Raje	11	Mumbai	Eliminated	11th
