= Ripudaman Handa =

Indian celebrity chef and television personality

- Education: Delhi University, New Delhi, India
- Occupations: Chef, Television Host & Entrepreneur
- Culinary career
- Cooking style: Indian cuisine
- Current restaurants
- Cloud dining in Hyderabad; Macchiato InNavi Mumbai
- Television shows
- MasterChef India, Junior Masterchef Swaad Ke Ustaad, Nach Baliye, Fortune Family, Rasoi Ki Rani, Roj Hoi Bhoj
- Awardss
- Tomorrow India; India of the year

Ripudaman Handa is an India celebrity chef, brand ambassador and television personality. He is the winner of MasterChef India season 3, and contested of Nach Baliye Season 6. Handa hosted the TV show Junior Masterchef Swaad Ke Ustaad aired on Star Plus and Big Ganga's show Roj Hoyi Bhoj.

== Awards ==
- Tomorrow's India
- Indian of the Year

== Shows ==
List	Tv Shows	Remarks	Channel
1	MasterChef India season 3	Winner	Star Plus
2	Junior Masterchef Swaad Ke Ustaad	Host	Star Plus
3	Nach Baliye Season 6	Finalist contested	Star Plus
4	MasterChef India season 4	Master Class Host	Star Plus
5	MasterChef India season 6	Host	Star Plus
6	Family Fortune	Finalist	Big Magic
7	Star Parivar Favourite Pratiyogi'	Contested	Star Plus
8	Snack Attack Firangi		Zee Zest
9	Rasoi Ki Rani Season 4	Chef	Big Magic
10	Roj Hoyi Bhoj Season 1	Chef	Big Ganga
11	Roj Hoyi Bhoj Season 2	Chef	Big Ganga
12	Roj Hoyi Bhoj Season 3	Chef	Big Ganga
13	Roj Hoyi Bhoj Season 4	Chef	Big Ganga
14	Yummy Times	Chef	Zee Zest

== See also ==
- List of Indian chefs
- List of chefs
