= Nita Mehta =

- Occupations: Entrepreneur, cooking instructor
- Years active: 1980s - present
- Website: nitamehta.com

Nita Mehta is an Indian entrepreneur. She is a cooking instructor, writer and publisher, restaurateur, recipe developer, and chef.

== Career ==
Mehta began giving cooking lessons from her home kitchen in the 1980s, starting with classes in making ice cream. Nirula's 21, an ice cream parlor offering 21 flavours, had recently become popular, and Mehta believed women would want to learn to make ice cream at home. She recreated Nirula's flavours and developed home recipes she could teach. She expanded class offerings in response to student requests, eventually developing teaching recipes for Chinese, Mughlai and European dishes.

Mehta wrote her first cookbook, Vegetarian Wonders, in 1992, but couldn't find a publisher, so she self-published it. It had limited success, and she switched to a single-topic booklet format, which was more successful; since then she has published on multiple subjects, including 101 Recipes for Children and The Best of Chicken and Paneer. She formed a publishing house in 1994, SNAB publishers. By 2001 she opened a culinary academy with a professional kitchen.

In 2010, Mehta and Hamdard Laboratories created mocktail and dessert recipes for Rooh Afza which were used in a new marketing campaign. Also in 2010, a school in Panchsheel Colony, New Delhi consulted Mehta who provided a menu which was handed over to parents as a guide to food which should be packed for students going to the school. academy.

In 2012 she opened restaurant Kelong at Sarabha Nagar in Ludhiana.

=== Appearances ===
Panasonic organised an event in Coimbatore in 2004 where Mehta was invited to share recipes for microwave cooking.

In 2007, Kurkure, a brand of ready-to-eat snacks owned by PepsiCo, ran a recipe contest which Mehta judged. Later in 2011, she appeared on the television cooking contest MasterChef India as a judge. In 2025 she judged Dainik Bhaskar's Super Chef 2025 contest.
