= Radhika Khanna =

Indian-American fashion designer (1974–2022)

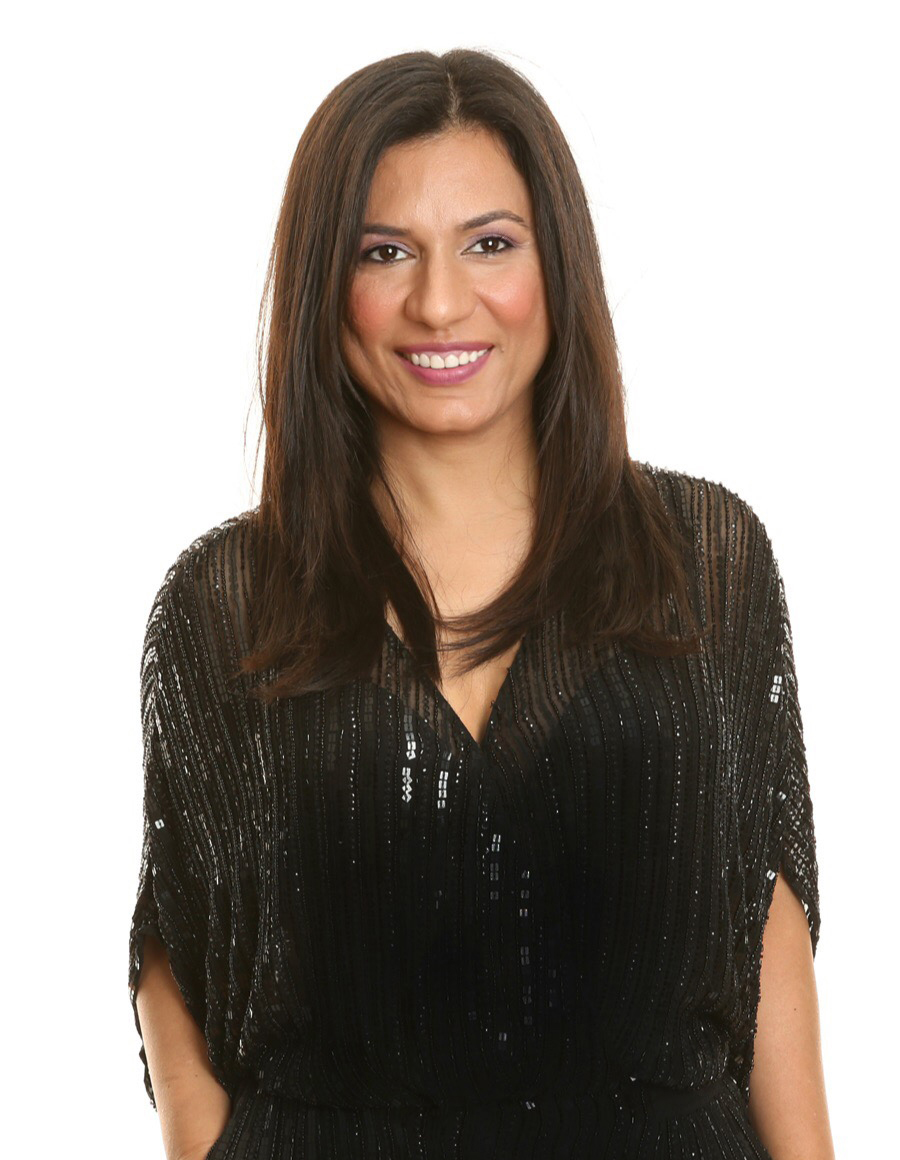
- Khanna in 2016
- Born: March 23, 1974; Amritsar, Punjab, India
- Died: February 28, 2022 (aged 47); New York City, New York, U.S.
- Education: Fashion Institute of Technology
- Known for: Fashion designer
- Relatives: Vikas Khanna (brother)
- Website: www.radhikakhanna.com

Radhika Khanna (March 23, 1974 – February 28, 2022) was an Indian-American fashion designer, entrepreneur and author. Khanna is the author of Yoga: From the Ganges to Wall Street.

== Early life ==
Khanna was born and raised in Amritsar, India. She was the daughter of Bindu and Davinder Khanna and sister of chef Vikas Khanna.

== Career ==
In 1999 Khanna moved to New York City from Amritsar, to study at the Fashion Institute of Technology. While studying full-time, she worked in restaurants in Manhattan to support herself and her education. After graduating from FIT, she interned with Donna Karan, before starting her own clothing company, Estilo Inc. in 2005.

Khanna designed outfits for the U.S television show Kitchen Nightmares.

== Personal life ==
Khanna lived in Midtown Manhattan. She was an active participant in the national campaign to find a cure for lupus, through the Lupus Foundation of America. She was also a Yoga expert and has promoted Yoga at the Lupus Foundation of America.

Khanna died from multiple organ failure in New York City, on February 28, 2022, at the age of 47. She suffered from lupus, kidney failure, and atypical hemolytic uremic syndrome in the last years of her life.

== Bibliography ==
- Pose: Yoga for working professionals
- Yoga: From the Ganges to Wall Street
- Standout: Yoga and self-defence: A complete guide to self-confidence for teenage girls
