= Sabyasachi Gorai =

Indian chef-entrepreneur

- Born: Asansol, West Bengal, India
- Other name: Chef Saby
- Occupations: Chef, restaurateur, culinary consultant
- Organization: Fabrica by Chef Saby
- Known for: Founder of Lavaash by Saby; promotion of Armenian–Bengali cuisine
- Awards: National Tourism Award for “Best Chef of India”

Sabyasachi Gorai, popularly known as Chef Saby, is an Indian chef, restaurateur, culinary consultant and television personality known for his contribution to contemporary Indian dining and popularization of fusion cuisines, particularly Armenian–Bengali culinary traditions in India.

== Career ==
He was born and brought up in Asansol, West Bengal. He first studied art before entering hotel management in the early 1990s, later training under chef P. Soundararajan and taking specialised culinary courses in France, Italy and the United States. He became popular as one of the youngest corporate chefs with the Olive Bar & Kitchen group, where he played a key role in the development of multiple restaurants in India, such as SodaBottleOpenerWala, and Olive Bar & Kitchen. In 2015, he founded Lavaash by Saby in New Delhi, a restaurant inspired by Armenian community of eastern India and their culinary influence, notably in Bengal and Asansol. Gorai has worked as a hospitality consultant through his company Fabrica by Chef Saby, served as President of the Young Chefs Association of India and appeared on television programmes such as MasterChef India as one of the culinary judges. He was awarded for promoting sustainable and slow-food practices and was given the National Tourism Award for "Best Chef of India" by the President of India in 2012.
