= Pooja Dhingra =

Indian pastry chef and businesswoman (born 1986)

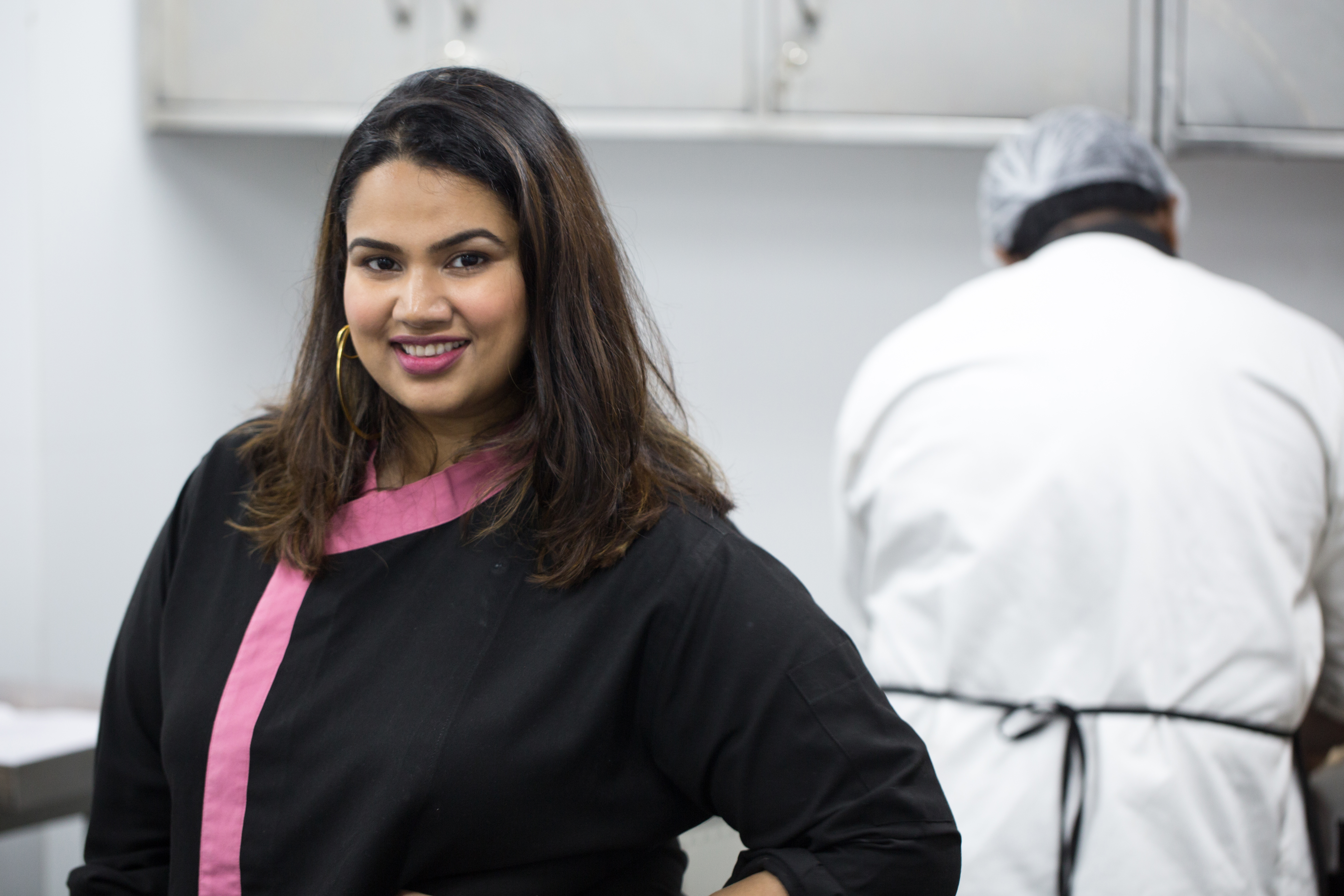
- Chef Pooja Dhingra at the Le15 Central Kitchen
- Born: 5 August 1986 (40 years old); Mumbai, India
- Education: Bombay Scottish School, Mahim César Ritz College; Le Cordon Bleu
- Culinary career
- Cooking style: French
- Current restaurant
- Le15 Patisserie
- Website: le15.com

Pooja Dhingra (born 5 August, 1986) is an Indian pastry chef and businesswoman. She opened India's first macaron store and is the owner of bakery chain Le15 Patisserie that specialises in macarons and a host of French desserts.

== Biography ==
Dhingra was born into a family interested in gastronomy. Both her father and her brother Vaarun Dhingra are restaurant owners. She attended the famous-Bombay Scottish School in Mumbai. When still young, Dhingra learnt the art of baking from her aunt. She initially enrolled at a law school in Mumbai before quitting in 2004, switching careers to attend a hospitality and management course at the César Ritz school in Le Bouveret, Switzerland. Three years later, she began training at Le Cordon Bleu in Paris. There she came across her first macaron at one of Pierre Hermé's patisseries. After completing her course, Dhingra returned to Mumbai and opened her first store in March 2010 with the single goal of creating Parisian styled culinary experiences in India. In 2016, Dhingra expanded her enterprise, opening a new location called Le15 Café in South Mumbai. While signature desserts named after French women will be featured, the cafe's menu includes simple, savoury food main course dishes.

When she opened her Mumbai business in 2010, she had a staff of only two. By October 2014, she had as many as 42. Her ambition is to open establishments throughout India.

She has been featured in national dailies and is a regular in fashion and lifestyle glossies not just for her abilities in the kitchen, but also as a dynamic businesswoman. Some consider her an inspiration to women. she was selected by Forbes India for inclusion in their ‘30 Under 30’ achievers list for 2014 and the Forbes 30 under 30 Asia list.

She has published two books, a best seller (in India) on baking. and The Wholesome Kitchen

She joined Chef Vikas Khanna and Chef Ranveer Brar as a judge of MasterChef India – Hindi 8 airing on Sony Entertainment Television.

== Bibliography ==
- The Big Book of Treats. Penguin Books India. 2014. ISBN 978-0143422686.
