= Shipra Khanna =

Indian celebrity chef

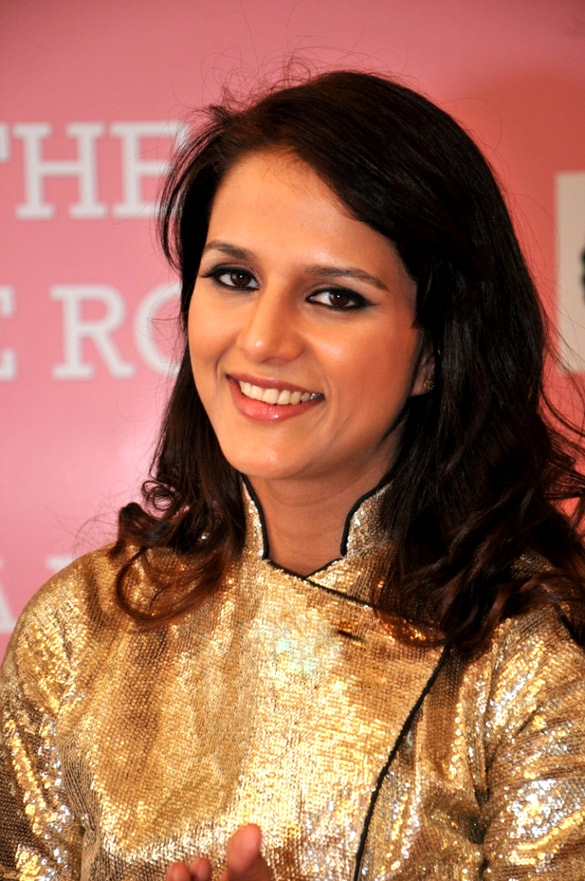
- Born: November 17, 1981 (age 44); Shimla, Himachal Pradesh, India
- Occupations: Celebrity chef; restaurateur; author; television personality
- Education: St.Bede's College
- Culinary career
- Cooking style: Indian- fusion Cuisine
- Current restaurants: The Darzi Bar & Kitchen, New Delhi - (14 Jan 2017 - present); H.O.T. - House of Taste, Ahmedabad - (10 Sept 2013 - present)
- Television shows: Pure Sin with Shipra Khanna - Food Food; Good Food Guide Season 2 - Star Plus, UAE; Flavors of Ramadan Season 3 - SONY, UAE; Master Class with Shipra Khanna - Tata Sky; K for Kids - Food Food; Britannia Star Chef with Saif Ali Khan
- Known for: MasterChef India
- Website: shiprakhanna.com

Shipra Khanna (born 17 November 1981) is an Indian celebrity chef, restaurateur, author and television personality. She is best known for winning the second season of the Indian television show MasterChef India (2012) at the age of 29.

== Early life and education ==
Born and brought up in Shimla, she went to school at Loreto Convent.

== Career ==
After winning MasterChef India (season 2), Shipra had a television show as a celebrity chef on Food Food, and went on to star in more televised cooking shows both in India and overseas.

On 11 September 2013, she opened her first Restaurant in Ahmedabad, Gujarat named "H.O.T - House of Taste"

On 14 January 2017, Shipra Opened her First Restaurant in New Delhi, India named The Darzi Bar & Kitchen.

== Awards and honours ==
- In 2014, She was honoured with the title of 'Culinary Connoisseur' for Tourism Australia and Cox & Kings
- She has been honoured by Le Cordon Bleu, Paris.
- She won the title "Women Chef taking taste beyond borders" by SAARC Chamber Women Entrepreneurs Council (SCWEC).
- She won the "Best Television Chef Book Outside Europe" by Gourmand World Cookbook Awards 2017.
- In May 2023, Shipra won the 'Celebrity Chef Influencer' award at WIBA Awards, at the Cannes Festival.

== Bibliography ==
- The Spice Route (2013)
- The Spice Route 1
- Sinfully Yours
- Super Foods for Awesome Memory
- Super Foods to Keep Your Brain Strong and Mood Lighter
- Empty Jaws Narrating Stories: Heart Touching Short Stories
- Simply Maharashrian
- Simply Punjabi
- Simply Rajasthani
- Simply Gujarati
- SIMPLY HIMACHALI
