= Sanjay Mishra =

Sanjay Mishra may refer to:

- Sanjay Mishra (musician), American guitarist of Indian descent
- Sanjay Mishra (actor) (born 1962), Indian film actor
