= Zee Ganga =

Bhojpuri general entertainment channel

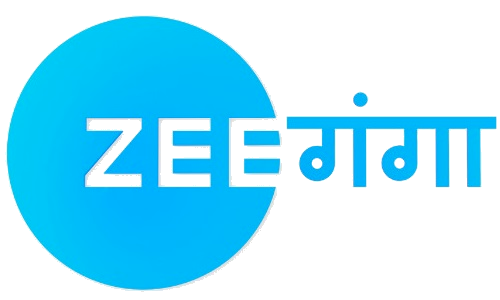
- Country: India
- Network: Zee Entertainment Enterprises
- Headquarters: New Delhi, Delhi, India

Programming
- Language: Bhojpuri
- Picture format: 576i(SDTV)

Ownership
- Owner: Zee Entertainment Enterprises
- Sister channels: Zee Biskope; Big Magic

History
- Launched: 14 January 2013; 13 years ago as Big Magic Bihar Jharkhand; 15 August 2014; 11 years ago as Big Magic Ganga; 14 January 2016; 10 years ago as Big Ganga; 20 September 2021; 4 years ago as Zee Ganga
- Replaced: Big Ganga
- Closed: 26 June 2024; 2 years ago
- Replaced by: Zee Anmol Cinema 2
- Former names: Big Magic Bihar Jharkhand; Big Magic Ganga

Links
- Website: Zee Ganga

Availability

Terrestrial
- D2M: 470-582MHz

Streaming media
- DD Free Dish: LCN 16

Zee Ganga was a Bhojpuri general entertainment channel. It was launched by Reliance Broadcast Network Limited (RBNL) as Big Ganga in 2013 but later acquired by ZEEL and they rebranded it as Zee Ganga in 2021. It was the only Bhojpuri channel on DD Free Dish which delivers original content for their viewers.

== History ==
On 14 January 2013, Reliance launched a new Bhojpuri channel called Big Magic Bihar & Jharkhand. Later on 15 August 2014, it was rebranded as Big Magic Ganga. On 1 January 2016, it was again renamed to Big Ganga.

In November 2016, ZEE acquired the two channels of RBNL - Big Magic and Big Ganga. On 20 September 2021, the channel was rebranded as Zee Ganga with introduction of few original Bhojpuri fiction and non-fiction contents.

== Former broadcast ==
=== Acquired series ===
- Banoo Main Teri Dulhann
- Kasamh Se
- No. 1 Bahuriya
- Qubool Hai
- Kumkum Bhagya
- Tashan-e-Ishq
- Maayka
- Zindagi Ki Mehek
- Kaala Teeka
- Sarojini – Ek Nayi Pehal
- Kehu Aapan Ba
- Piyaa Albela
- Gangaa
- B. D. O. Bitiya
- Sasural Wali Mai
- Begusarai
- Har Mushkil Ka Hal Akbar Birbal
- Geet Dholi
- Agle Janam Mohe Bitiya Hi Kijo
- Jeet Gayi Toh Piya Morey
- Misri - Rishtan Me Mithaas
- Satrangi Sasural
- Doli Armaano Ki
- Tenali Rama
- Uran Chiraiya

=== Horror/supernatural series ===
- Brahmarakshas
- Trikali – Abhishap Ya Vardan
- Naag Kanyaka
- Daayan
- Trikali – Abhishap Ya Vardan 2

=== Mythological series ===
- Devon Ke Dev...Mahadev
- Rani Bitiya- Aash se uran ka safar
- Karunamayee Rani Rashmani
- Baal Krishna
- Santoshi Maa
- Mahadevi
- Sankat Mochan Jai Hanuman
- Divya Shakti
- Jai Sri Krishna

=== Reality/non-scripted shows ===
- Sa Re Ga Ma Pa Bhojpuri
- Mureta Maidaan

=== Comedy series ===
- Bagal Wali Jaan Mareli

== Sister channel ==
=== Zee Biskope ===
Zee Biskope is a Bhojpuri free-to-air movie channel launched by Zee Entertainment Enterprise Ltd.
