= Pankaj Bhadouria =

Indian chef (born 1971)

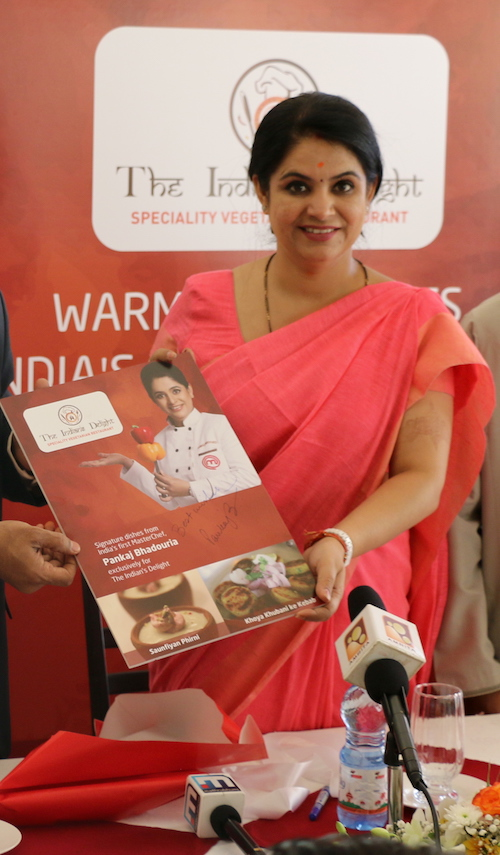
- Pankaj Bhadouria unveiling her signature recipes in Muscat
- Born: 14 July 1971 (age 55); Lucknow, Uttar Pradesh, India
- Education: University of Lucknow (BA, MA, BEd)
- Occupations: Chef, television show host, author, and entrepreneur
- Website: www.pankajbhadouria.com

Pankaj Bhadouria is the winner of MasterChef India Season 1 (2010). She was a school teacher who quit a 16-year-old job to participate in the first season of MasterChef India. She has hosted the TV shows Chef Pankaj Ka Zayka (StarPlus), Kifayati Kitchen (Zee Khana Khazana), 3 Course with Pankaj (Zee Khana Khazana), Rasoi se- Pankaj Bhadouria ke Saath(ETV), Sales Ka Baazigar (ETV). She was the first MasterChef Winner worldwide to have an official MasterChef Cookbook in her name and has written two more cookery books Barbie- I am a Chef, and Chicken from my Kitchen (Bloomsbury Publishing)

== Early life and education ==
Born on 14 July 1971 in New Delhi to Vinod Khanna and Priya Khanna, Pankaj is the elder of their two children with one younger brother. She lost her father at the age of 13 years and her mother when she was 22. She did her schooling from Kendriya Vidyalaya, New Delhi and finished her higher education in Lucknow. She did her bachelor's degree in English, master's degree in English literature from Lucknow University, and then she also did her bachelor's degree in education from Lucknow University to prepare herself for her chosen career.

== Personal life ==
She is married to Charu Samarth and has two children, a daughter, Sonalika Bhadouria and a son, Siddhant Bhadouria.

== Television ==
- MasterChef India Season 1 -Star Plus (2010)
- Chef Pankaj Ka Zayka – Star Plus (2011)
- Rick Stein's India, Episode 6 -BBC2, TLC, Discovery (2012)
- Sales Ka Baazigar- ETV (2013)
- Kifayati Kitchen- Zee Khana Khazana(2014–2015)
- Rasoi Se – Pankaj Bhadouria ke Saath ETV (2015)
- 3 Course with Pankaj- Zee Khana Khazana (2015)
- Just Like That – Living Foodz (2015)
- Health in 100 – Living Foodz (2016)
- Dream Kitchen – Living Foodz (2017)

== Pankaj Bhadouria Culinary Academy ==
Pankaj started her culinary academy in Lucknow on 16 August 2012. It offers Professional Courses and Certificate Courses for amateur chefs.

== Endorsements ==
Pankaj's passion for cooking granted her popularity amongst brands.

Pankaj is a part of Microsoft Lumia 535 Digital Campaign where along with Kangana Ranaut and Saina Nehwal, she encourages people to follow their dreams in an inspiring film titled "Ashaiyen"

Pankaj is also the face of the Brand Knorr- Cup a soup, Soups and Noodles and has shot an extensive TV Campaign and Print Campaigns for Knorr.

She is also the Brand Ambassador for MasterChef Travels Cox and Kings Worldwide.

She also endorsed Eastern Masalas, a leading Spice Brand in Southern India.

She was also the face of Taaza Tea, HUL, activity- Huunar Apka, Pehchaan Hamaari, an effort to recognise the hidden talents in women from small towns in Uttar Pradesh.

Pankaj Bhadouria is chosen by the Spanish Government as an Ambassador for the promotion of Olive oil in India for the campaign called Olive Oil Revolution.

Her other Brand Associations include Samsung Smart Oven, Kent Juicer & Pasta Maker, Sensodyne, Reliance Fresh, Kelloggs and Tefal.

== Awards and recognition ==
- MasterChef India Winner (Season 1)
- Featured in the list of: 9 People Who Made It Big After Participating in Reality Shows -by Indiatimes
- Rated as one of the few TV Chefs with a great deal of integrity for her thoughtful and meticulous recipes on TV shows – Indian Express
- Co hosted the Knorr (brand) Master Class, with MasterChef Australia Judge Chef Gary Mehigan at the World on a Plate Food Festival, Bangalore, June 2016
- Winner of Outlook Social Media Award- OSM Kitchen King/Queen of the Year Award by Outlook Magazine, 2016
- Felicitated by the Honorable President of India, Shri R. N. Kovind as ‘First Ladies’ – an award given by the Ministry of Women & Child Development, Govt. of India.

== Restaurants ==
Café by Default – Located in Lucknow, this café offers a variety of dishes with a mix of traditional and contemporary flavors.

Tramp Tree Café – Also in Lucknow, this café is known for its cozy ambiance and diverse menu, including continental and Indian cuisine.

The Culinary Court – This restaurant is part of the Hotel Clarks Avadh in Lucknow, where Chef Pankaj has crafted a menu that celebrates Awadhi cuisine.

== Speaker ==
Pankaj has a number of times been invited as a speaker to many prestigious events

- Key & Chief Speaker "CONNECXION 2016", IHMCT Dehradun
- TEDx seminar IIT-BHU, Varanasi,
- TEDx Indus Business Academy, Bangalore, in June 2012
- Inspirit 2014, The Annual Conclave, NIT, Durgapur
- International Youth Forum for Policy, Change and Development at Sharda University, New Delhi where she addressed students on 'Alternate Careers'.
- 3rd Women Entrepreneurship Conference that was held in New Delhi in February 2013.
- Franchisee India Meet 2013 to address a gathering from the entire food industry on the changing trends in the QSR menus.
- TEDx IMT, Hyderabad in January 2017
- TEDx IIM, Shillong in February 2017

== Charity work ==
- Training "Railway Children" in skill development -Bakery, in association with NGO – Ahsaas.
- Cooking 3.0- A Fund Raising Cookery Workshop for Make A Difference at Radisson Blu, New Delhi
- Created Lucknow's Largest Community Kitchen for the Under Privileged Children on 14 August 2016 at the Pankaj Bhadouria Culinary Academy, Lucknow. The event was created in association with the Child's Right Commission, Govt. of Uttar Pradesh.

== Bibliography ==
- MasterChef Cookbook(2011) – ISBN 978-8184973976
- Barbie- I am a Chef –
- Chicken From My Kitchen: The Indian Way(2014) – ISBN 978-9382951506
- Uttar Pradesh a Cultural Kaleidoscope by Times of India Group and UP Government
- The Secret's in the Spice Mix(2017) – ISBN 978-0143428497
