= Sanjeev Kapoor =

Indian celebrity chef and entrepreneur (born 1964)

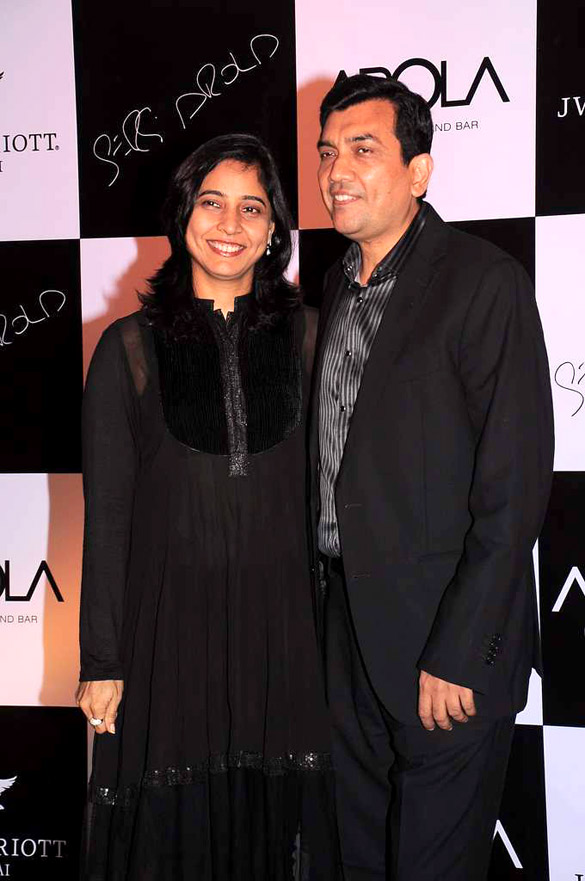
- Kapoor in 2016
- Born: 10 April 1964 (age 62); Ambala, Haryana, India
- Education: Institute of Hotel Management, Catering & Nutrition
- Occupations: Chef; television presenter; entrepreneur
- Known for: Creating the Shaam Savera dish
- Spouse: Alyona Kapoor
- Culinary career
- Cooking style: Indian cuisine
- Television shows
- Signature, Khazana, The Yellow Chilli, Pin yin Café, Gold Leaf Banquets, Sura Vie
- Awards
- Padma Shri (2017)
- Website: www.sanjeevkapoor.com

Sanjeev Kapoor (born 10 April 1964) is an Indian celebrity chef, television presenter, cookbook author and entrepreneur. He began his career in the hospitality industry in 1984 after completing the Diploma in Hotel Management from the Institute of Hotel Management, Catering & Nutrition, Pusa, New Delhi.

== Career ==
After working in many hotels at different places like India, New Zealand, he became the youngest Executive Chef of Centaur Hotel in Mumbai in the year 1992.

He is also the recipient of the Best Executive Chef of India Award by H & FS and the Mercury Gold Award at Geneva, Switzerland by Indian Federation of Culinary Associations. He is on board as one of the key members of the International Culinary Panel of Singapore Airlines.

== Personal life ==
Kapoor is married to Alyona Kapoor, who is also a part of his business, Turmeric Vision Pvt. Ltd. (TVPL).

== Books ==
- The Yellow Chilli Cookbook
- Mastering the Art of Indian Cooking
- How to Cook Indian
- Royal Indian Recipes
- Khana Khazana: Celebration of Indian Cookery
- No Oil Vegetarian Recipes
- No Onion No Garlic: Recipes to Keep Life Simple

== Awards ==
- Padma Shri (2017)- fourth highest Indian national honour
- Achieved the Guinness World Record by cooking 918 kg khichdi live at World Food India 2017, New Delhi.
- Case Study on Sanjeev Kapoor Published By Harvard Association
- ITA Award (2015) - For Popular Chef & Entrepreneur (Zaika-E-Hind)
- ITA Award (2010, 2004, 2002) - For Best Cookery Show (Khana Khazana)
- National Award of 'Best Chef of India' by the Government of India for his popularity and contribution to Indian cuisine
- Ranked 31st in Reader's Digest list of '100 of India's most trusted persons' and 73rd in the Forbes list of 'top 100 Indian celebrities of 2019'.
- Panel of Judges for Master Chef India Season 3 and 4.

== See also ==
- Ranveer Brar
- Harpal Singh Sokhi
- Nisha Madhulika
- Stir Crazy Thane
- Sabyasachi Gorai
