= Kunal Kapur =

Indian celebrity chef and restaurateur (born 1979)

- Born: 18 September 1979 (age 47)
- Education: St. Francis de Sales School; Dr. Ambedkar Institute of Hotel Management Catering & Nutrition
- Culinary career
- Cooking style: Indian food
- Website: www.chefkunalkapur.com

Kunal Kapur (born 18 September 1979) is an Indian celebrity chef and restaurateur known for hosting and judging MasterChef India.

== Early life ==
Kapur was born in New Delhi to a Punjabi family. He studied at St. Francis de Sales School and pursued higher education in Hotel Management from Dr. Ambedkar Institute of Hotel Management Catering & Nutrition, Chandigarh.

From a very early age, Kapur took a liking to cooking and pursued it to become one of the most well-known chefs in India. He trains underprivileged and unemployed youth in cooking and helps raise funds to make their own sustained food business together with United Ways Delhi. He is also passionate about automobiles, technology, travel, fashion and history.

== Career ==
Having taken early lessons about cooking from his father and grandfather, he began his career around 2000 with the Taj Group of Hotels. Currently, he is the Executive Sous Chef at the Leela Kempinski in Gurgaon.

In January 2008, he was rated as "The Best Indian Chef" in New Delhi by India Today, and he was titled as "The Next Big Guy in Kebabs and Curries in India". He was given an opportunity to present Satvik cuisine to Prime Minister Narendra Modi and German Chancellor Angela Merkel in Bangalore. He also cooked for 42 first ladies on the India Africa Summit besides an interactive cooking session with them during their recent visit to India.

== Restaurants ==
Kapur's restaurant, "Quarter Plate" located in Noida, offers a dining experience with a menu that blends traditional Indian flavors with modern culinary techniques.

== Television ==
- MasterChef India: He has hosted and judged the popular cooking competition reality television series in Season 1, Season 2, Season 3, Season 5 and Season 9.
- MasterChef America: He was invited as a guest judge in Season 2.
- Pickle Nation: This 18-episode series on Living Foodz explores the age old pickles & pickling stories of India. Kapur travels across India to bring out the most unique pickles and related stories.
- Thalis Of India: The tradition of serving food in big thals or platters has a reason & significance. Kunal demystifies the different thalis of India as he travels to unravel them.
- My Yellow Table: Kapur has hosted the popular food series from Season 1 to Season 4 on NDTV Good Times.
- Curries Of India: This show explores the history and influences on Indian sub-continent which shaped its curries. Aired on Living Foodz, this food and travel series has 22 episodes that brings out the culinary journey of the classic curries.
- Foodie Comes to America: Shot entirely in New York and California, it discovered the journey of Indian food in USA. It aired on Times Now and captured Kapur's travel and culinary journey showcasing the best Indo- American cuisine.

== Awards and achievements ==
- Kapur's name was cited by the Limca Book of Records for creating India's largest Chocolate Tower.
- He is the recipient of The Indian Television Academy Award for the Best Jury/Anchor for Junior MasterChef India.
- He was awarded the Sir Edmund Hillary Fellowship, by the Prime Minister of New Zealand, John Key in the field of Food & Beverage.
- He won the Epicurean Guild Award for Best Food Entertainer in 2017 for Thalis of India.
- The Most Enterprising Brands & Leaders of Asia Award by WBR India.
- Pinkvilla Style Icons Awards for Stunningly Stylish Culinarian of the Year in 2023.

== Associations ==
- Kapur is the brand ambassador for United Ways Delhi, a non profit organization that focuses on improving lives by education, income and health. His role as an ambassador is to train under-privileged youth in food production and educate them with the right kitchen skills and techniques to help them in becoming small-scale entrepreneurs/food hawkers.
- Kapur is in the league of Elite Star Chefs in German Airlines Lufthansa, where he has customized menus for first and business class passengers.
- He works closely with National Association of Streer Vendors in India to improve the lives and quality of food and sanitation of food hawkers in India.
- He also promotes healthy cooking and is closely associated with Avanza Avocados for the same.
- Kapur is associated with Tupperware and has recently launched two of their new products in Delhi.
- He is also a part of Passion Trails. Organized by The Times of India, he takes food enthusiasts on culinary adventures around the country.
