= Ranveer Brar =

Indian celebrity chef (born 1978)

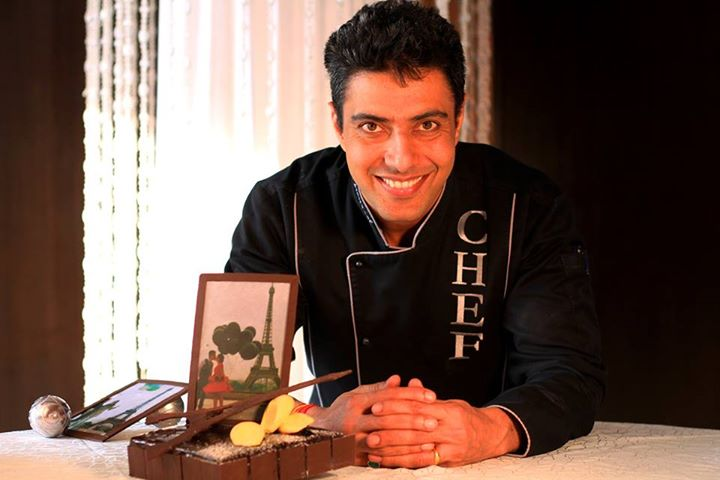
- Born: Ranveer Singh Brar; 8 February 1978 (age 48); Lucknow, Uttar Pradesh, India
- Education: Institute of Hotel Management, Lucknow
- Occupations: Chef, television host
- Spouse: Pallavi Suresh Jadhav-Brar (m. 2013)
- Website: www.ranveerbrar.com

Ranveer Singh Brar (born 8 February 1978) is an Indian chef, television personality, author, restaurateur and actor. He has hosted and appeared in a number of food and travel television programmes and has served as a judge on MasterChef India. He trained at the Institute of Hotel Management, Lucknow, and has worked in the hospitality industry in India and the United States.

Brar has also been involved in the establishment and development of restaurants and food-related businesses in India and abroad. He has published books on food and his culinary career, and has appeared in film and web-series productions.

== Early life ==
Ranveer Singh Brar was born on 8 February 1978 in Lucknow, Uttar Pradesh, into a Sikh family. He grew up in Lucknow and developed an interest in the city's food culture, particularly its kebabs. As a teenager, he began working with kebab vendor known as Munir Ustad, in Lucknow. Brar has described this period as an important part of his early culinary training.

After spending several months working with Ustad Munir, Brar enrolled at the Institute of Hotel Management, Lucknow, to pursue formal training in hospitality and culinary arts. At 17, he took up an apprenticeship to show his parents that he was committed to becoming a chef.

== Career ==
Brar began his professional career with the Taj Group of Hotels, including the Taj Mahal Hotel in New Delhi. In 2001, he worked at the Fort Aguada Beach Resort in Goa, participating in the launch of its dining venues, including Morisco, il Camino and Fishtail. In 2003, Brar joined the Radisson Blu Hotel in Noida as an executive chef. He subsequently moved to Boston, Massachusetts, where he was involved in the opening of BanQ, a Franco-Asian restaurant. The restaurant received recognition from Wallpaper magazine, including its designation as the publication's Best New Restaurant in the World. Brar later worked as a corporate chef for One World Hospitality Group in Boston.

Brar returned to India and joined Novotel Mumbai Juhu Beach as senior executive chef. He subsequently became involved in a number of restaurant and food-service projects. These included FLYP@MTV in Delhi, English Vinglish and TAG GourmArt Kitchen in Mumbai, and Mayura in the Greater Toronto Area, Canada. He was also involved in food and beverage projects at Alila Fort Bishangarh in Rajasthan and worked with Royal Caribbean International on Indian food offerings for its cruise operations. He has also worked with Thomas Cook India and Atout France on food-related offerings for travellers to France.

In 2015, Brar was involved in the launch of FLYP@MTV in Delhi, followed by additional outlets in Chandigarh and Mumbai. In 2016, he launched English Vinglish, a vegetarian patisserie in Mumbai, and TAG GourmArt Kitchen, an all-vegetarian fine-dine restaurant.

In September 2023, Brar opened Kashkan, an Indian restaurant at Dubai Festival City Mall. The restaurant's menu draws on regional Indian cuisines.

In October 2025, Brar opened Kashkan Kissaghar at H Hotel on Sheikh Zayed Road in Dubai. The restaurant represents an extension of the Kashkan concept, with Brar describing Kissaghar as a more intimate format centred on food, drinks and storytelling.

In April 2026, Brar was appointed Brand Ambassador for Odia cuisine by the Government of Odisha, with the role focused on promoting the state's culinary heritage nationally and internationally. The appointment was formalised by the Odisha Tourism Department during the Odia Paksha celebrations.

== Television and shows ==
Early television work Brar began appearing on food and lifestyle television programmes in the 2010s. He hosted programmes including Breakfast Xpress, Snack Attack, The Great Indian Rasoi, Home, Health Bhi Taste Bhi, Ranveer's Cafe, Food Tripping, Global Menu and Northern Flavours – Meethi Masti.

MasterChef India

Brar made his debut as a judge on MasterChef India in its fourth season in 2014, alongside Sanjeev Kapoor and Vikas Khanna. He subsequently returned for the sixth, seventh and eighth seasons. In 2025, he served as a judge on Celebrity MasterChef India alongside Vikas Khanna and Farah Khan. In 2026, he returned as a judge for the ninth season of MasterChef India, alongside Vikas Khanna and Kunal Kapur.

Food and Travel programmes

Brar has also hosted food and travel programmes. In 2018, he presented Station Master's Tiffin, which followed food and culinary traditions associated with Indian railway stations. In 2019, he hosted Himalayas: The Offbeat Adventure, a programme exploring food, communities and travel in the Himalayan region.

He subsequently appeared in programmes including Secrets Behind Food, Raja Rasoi Aur Andaaz Anokha, Rasoi Ki Jung Mummyon Ke Sung and You Got Chef'd.

Digital and later programmes

Brar has also hosted digital food programmes. He hosted Ranveer On The Road, a digital food and travel series, and later presented Maa Ki Baat, a digital series centred on home cooking and recipes. He co-hosted the second and third seasons of You Got Chef'd and hosted Dum Laga Ke India, a food and travel programme focused on biryani and its regional variations.

He subsequently appeared in Star vs Food Survival, which premiered on Discovery and Discovery+ in 2023 and returned for a second season in 2025. In 2024, he hosted The Family Table on Epic TV. He has also appeared in Thums Up Toofani Biryani Hunt.

In 2026, Brar hosted Yess Chef, a celebrity reality series released on YouTube.

Acting

In 2022, Brar appeared as an actor in the anthology series Modern Love: Mumbai. In 2024, he made his feature-film debut in The Buckingham Murders, directed by Hansal Mehta, playing Daljeet Kohli alongside Kareena Kapoor Khan.

== Filmography ==
Film

The Buckingham Murders (2024) — Daljeet Kohli

Web series

Modern Love Mumbai (2022) — Rajveer

Maa Ka Sum (2026) — Abhimanyu

Television and reality programmes

The Traitors India season 2 (2026) — contestant

== Books ==
Brar has authored three books on Indian cuisine and his culinary experiences.

His first book, Come Into My Kitchen, was published by Collins India in 2016. The book combines recipes with accounts of his culinary career and experiences in Lucknow, Boston and Mumbai.

His second book, A Traditional Twist, was published by Popular Prakashan. The book focuses on Indian cooking and presents traditional recipes alongside Brar's interpretations of them.

In 2024, Brar published A Journey Through India, his third book. The book explores regional Indian cuisines and their connections with local culture, history and traditions. It covers culinary traditions and ingredients from different parts of India.

== Awards and recognition ==
Brar has been described as an honorary member of the James Beard Foundation and has cooked at the James Beard House in New York.

He has also received recognition for his contribution to various cuisines from institutions including the American Institute of Wine & Food (AIWF), the Academy for International Culinary Arts (AICA) and the Mayor of Boston.

In 2017, Brar received the Indian of the Year award for Chef and TV Host of the Year.

In 2018, he received the Food Entertainer of the Year award at the LF Epicurean Guild Awards.

In 2022, he received the People's Choice – Culinary Icons of the Year award at the India Food & Beverage Awards, jointly with Sanjeev Kapoor.

He was also named Chef of the Year at the Indian Restaurant Congress and received the Super Stylish Chef award at the Pinkvilla Style Icons Awards.

In 2023, Brar received the Best Actor in an Anthology award at the e4m Play Streaming Media Awards for his performance in Modern Love Mumbai.

In 2024, he received the 'Celebrity Influencer of the Year' award at the Influencer Awards 2024

In 2025, Brar received the Elle Impact Award in the Food category.

He was also named Most Stylish Culinary Artist of the Year at the Bollywood Hungama Style Icons Summit and Awards and Most Versatile Artist of the Year – Male at the Bollywood Hungama India Entertainment Awards.

In the same year, he was named Unlimit Trailblazer at the Zee Zest Unlimit Awards.

In 2026, Brar was named Most Stylish Chef of the Year at the Bollywood Hungama Style Icons Awards. He was also awarded 'Chef Extraordinaire' by Bombay Times in 2026
