= Vikas Khanna =

Michelin star Indian celebrity chef and restaurateur

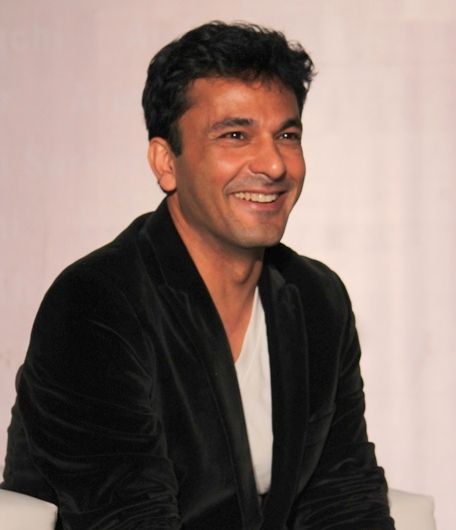
- Khanna in 2012
- Born: 1971 or 1972 (age 54–55); Amritsar, Punjab, India
- Education: Manipal Academy of Higher Education; GD Goenka University
- Style: Indian cuisine
- Relatives: Radhika Khanna (sister)

Vikas Khanna is an Indian celebrity chef, restaurateur, cookbook writer, and filmmaker. He has been one of the judges on MasterChef India since the show began.

== Early life and education ==
Khanna was born in Amritsar, India in a Punjabi family. He did his schooling at St. Francis School, Amritsar. He was born with a leg deformity (club foot) and wasn't able to run until he was 13 years old. He graduated from Manipal Academy of Higher Education in 1991 where he studied hotel management. He then studied at Culinary Institute of America and New York University.

He received an honorary doctorate at GD Goenka University.

== Career ==
While in India, Khanna worked for the Taj Hotels, Oberoi group, Welcome group, and Leela Group of Hotels. Khanna worked at Salaam Bombay and The Café at the Rubin Museum of Art in New York before he joined Junoon, an upscale Indian restaurant in Flatiron District of Manhattan.

In 2019, he opened a restaurant called Kinara in Dubai. In 2020, he opened a restaurant called Ellora in Dubai. In 2024, he opened a restaurant, Bungalow in the East Village neighborhood of New York City. Khanna has authored more than 40 books. One of his books Magnum opus - Utsav was auctioned as the world's most expensive cookbook. He also actively supports the cause of nutrition in India and is the goodwill ambassador of Smile Foundation.

== Television shows ==
From 2011, Khanna hosted seasons 2 to 8 of MasterChef India and a series based on the original British version. He has been hosting all the seasons of the show since then. Khanna was invited as a guest judge on MasterChef Australia in Season 6. He appeared as a Consultant chef to help a failing Indian restaurant named Dillon's (renamed to Purnima) on the Gordon Ramsay TV series Kitchen Nightmares. Khanna appeared as a judge and an Indian-cuisine specialist on the two-part season finale of Hell's Kitchen.

== Film production ==
His documentary Kitchens of Gratitude was featured at Marche du Film at the 69th Cannes Film Festival.

His directorial debut The Last Color is a film about the daily struggles for survival on the streets of Banaras, India.

== Public advocacy ==
In January 2026, Vikas Khanna drew public attention to hygiene concerns at Mumbai’s Chhatrapati Shivaji Maharaj International Airport after sharing images of worn and dusty carpets inside the terminal. Describing the condition as “beyond cleaning,” he urged airport authorities to remove the carpets, citing potential health risks for passengers, especially those with respiratory issues. The airport authorities acknowledged his concerns and stated that corrective measures would be taken, prioritising passenger health and comfort.

== Recognition ==
- Top 10 Chefs in the world by Deutsche Welle News and Gazette Review.
- Doctor of Philosophy (Honoris causa) Degree by the G D Goenka University.
- Doctorate in literature (Honoris causa) by D Y Patil University.
- James Beard Foundation Award nomination for his book Return to the Rivers in 2014.
- "Rising Star" Chef Award by Star Chefs for his role in shaping the future of American Cuisine(2011).
- GQ India Man of the year 2012 by GQ Magazine.
- The Shining Star Award from "Just One Break, Inc."
- Featured on the cover of Men's Health India Magazine in 2012.
- He was voted "New York's Hottest Chef" in a poll conducted by the New York Eater blog.
- His New York based restaurant “Bungalow” won Michelin 2024 Bib Gourmand award.
- Chef Vikas Khanna was awarded the highest Rotary honor, the Paul Harris Fellow, by Priya Ahluwalia from the SWFL Rotary Club, and was also inducted as an honorary member of the club.
- In 2024, Chef Vikas Khanna joined Rotary leaders from the SWFL Rotary Club in launching a literacy initiative at a NASDAQ event in New York, highlighting the role of education and service in global development.

== See also ==
- Indians in the New York City metropolitan area
