= Institute of Hotel Management =

Public hospitality school in India

- Institute of Hotel Management, Catering Technology and Applied Nutrition
- Other name: IHM or IHMs (plural)
- Type: Public; Hospitality school
- Established: 1961; 65 years ago (Later came under National Institute of Design Act, 2014.)
- Affiliations: National Council for Hotel Management and Catering Technology
- Location: Multi-location
- Language: English

The Institute of Hotel Management, Catering Technology and Applied Nutrition (IHMCT&AN), generally known as the Institute of Hotel Management (IHM), is a multi-location public hospitality school in India. IHM is established by the Ministry of Tourism of the Government of India. It is also under the jurisdiction of the Ministry of Tourism. It caters to not only the students of India but also international students from the SAARC.

== Institutes ==
=== Central government ===
Institute of Hotel Management
No.	Institute	City	State	Type	Founded	Established as IHM
1	Institute of Hotel Management, Kufri, Shimla	Shimla	Himachal Pradesh	Central		1984
2	Institute of Hotel Management, Bangalore	Bengaluru	Karnataka	Central	1969	1983
3	Institute of Hotel Management, Bhopal	Bhopal	Madhya Pradesh	Central	1978	1986
4	Institute of Hotel Management, Bhubaneswar	Bhubaneswar	Odisha	Central	1973	1984
5	Institute of Hotel Management, Chandigarh	Chandigarh	Chandigarh	Central		1990
6	Institute of Hotel Management, Chennai	Chennai	Tamil Nadu	Central	1963	1999
7	Institute of Hotel Management, Delhi	New Delhi	Delhi	Central	1962	1982
9	Institute of Hotel Management, Goa		Goa	Central	1968	1984
10	Institute of Hotel Management, Gurdaspur	Gurdaspur	Punjab	Central		1984
11	Institute of Hotel Management, Guwahati	Guwahati	Assam	Central		1984
12	Institute of Hotel Management, Gwalior	Gwalior	Madhya Pradesh	Central		1986
13	Institute of Hotel Management, Hajipur	Hajipur	Bihar	Central		1998
14	Institute of Hotel Management, Hyderabad	Hyderabad	Telangana	Central	1972	1984
15	Institute of Hotel Management, Jaipur	Jaipur	Rajasthan	Central		
16	Institute of Hotel Management, Kolkata	Kolkata	West Bengal	Central	1963	1987
17	Institute of Hotel Management, Lucknow	Lucknow	Uttar Pradesh	Central	1969	1983
18	Institute of Hotel Management, Mumbai	Mumbai	Maharashtra	Central	1954	1982
19	Institute of Hotel Management, Shillong	Shillong	Meghalaya	Central		2001
20	Institute of Hotel Management, Ahmedabad	Ahmedabad / Gandhinagar	Gujarat	Central	1972	1984
21	Institute of Hotel Management, Srinagar	Srinagar	Jammu and Kashmir	Central		1984
22	Institute of Hotel Management, Thiruvananthapuram	Thiruvananthapuram	Kerala	Central		2010
23	Institute of Hotel Management, Ongole	Ongole	Andhra Pradesh	Central		

=== State government ===
Institute of Hotel Management
No.	Institute	City	State	Type	Founded	Established as IHM
1	IHM, Ranchi	Ranchi	Jharkhand	State	2019	
2	Institute of Hotel Management, Bathinda	Bathinda	Punjab	State	2009	
3	Institute of Hotel Management, Panchkula	Panchkula	Haryana	State		
4	Institute of Hotel Management, Pune	Pune	Maharashtra	State		
5	Institute of Hotel Management, Dehradun	Dehradun	Uttrakhand	State	2006	
6	Institute of Hotel Management, Bodh Gaya	Bodh Gaya	Bihar	State	2006	
7	State Institute of Hotel Management, Raipur	Nava Raipur	Chhattisgarh	State	2020	
8	Institute of Hotel Management, Hamirpur	Hamirpur	Himachal Pradesh	State	2009	
9	Institute of Hotel Management, Kurukshetra	Kurukshetra	Haryana	State	2008	
10	State Institute of Hotel Management, Jodhpur	Jodhpur	Rajasthan	State	1996	

=== Private ===
No.	Institute	City	State	Type	Founded	Established as IHM
1	Institute of Hotel Management, Aurangabad	Aurangabad	Maharashtra	State	1989	Not Affiliated

== Admissions ==
National Council for Hotel Management and Catering Technology (Society) was set up in the year 1982 by the Government of India as an autonomous body for coordinated growth and development of hospitality education in the country. National Council of Hotel Management and Catering Technology Joint Entrance Examination or NCHMCT JEE (also known as NHCM JEE) is a national-level entrance exam conducted to offer admission to aspirants in hospitality and hotel administration programs.

== Notable alumni ==
- Sanjeev Kapoor from Institute of Hotel Management, Catering & Nutrition
- Vivek Singh (chef) from Institute of Hotel Management, Catering & Nutrition
- Rakesh Sethi (chef) from Institute of Hotel Management, Catering & Nutrition
- Manjit Gill from Institute of Hotel Management, Catering & Nutrition
- Madhulika Liddle from Institute of Hotel Management, Catering & Nutrition
- Ranveer Brar from Institute of Hotel Management, Lucknow
- Pankaj Tripathi from Institute of Hotel Management, Hajipur
- Anjan Chatterjee from IHM Kolkata
- Harpal Singh Sokhi from Institute of Hotel Management, Bhubaneswar
- Sheela Murthy from Institute of Hotel Management, Bengaluru
- Soma Valliappan from Institute of Hotel Management, Chennai
- Manish Mehrotra from Institute of Hotel Management Mumbai
- Thangam Philip from Institute of Hotel Management, Mumbai
- Farrokh Khambata from Institute of Hotel Management, Mumbai
- Jehangir Mehta from Institute of Hotel Management, Mumbai
- Sameer Nair from Institute of Hotel Management, Mumbai
- Piyush Mishra from Institute of Hotel Management, Mumbai
- Gippy Grewal from Institute of Hotel Management, Panchkula
- Anoop Suri
- Sandip Soparrkar
- Rafiq Zakaria from Institute of Hotel Management, Aurangabad
- Sanjay Thumma from Institute of Hotel Management, Hyderabad

== See also ==
- Indian Institute of Tourism and Travel Management
- List of institutions of higher education in India
