= IHM Kolkata =

Hospitality management school

Institute of Hotel Management, Kolkata
- Institute of Hotel Management, Catering Technology and Applied Nutrition, Kolkata
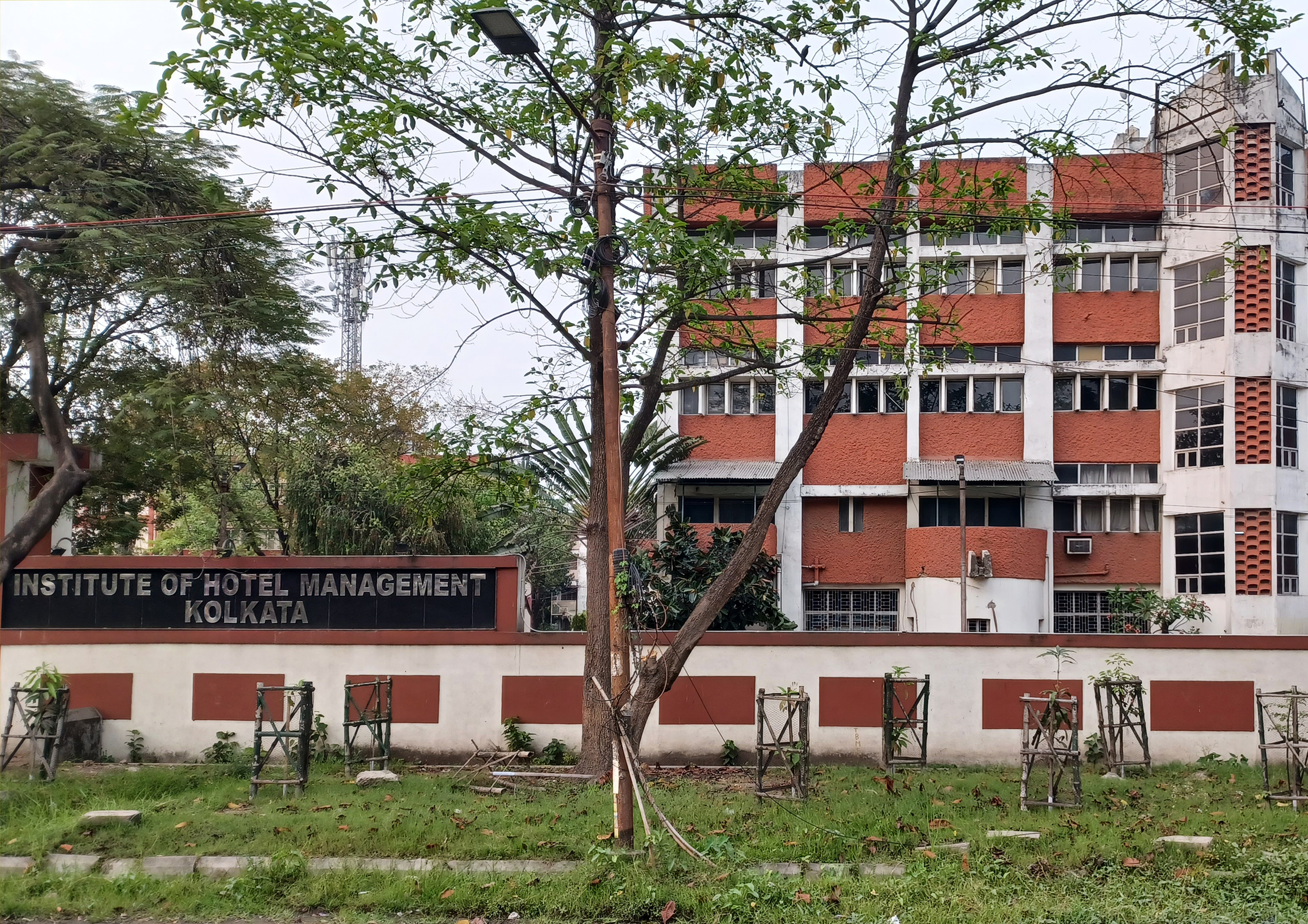
- Motto: "Service Before Self"
- Type: Hospitality management school
- Established: 1963; 63 years ago
- Affiliations: Jawaharlal Nehru University, NCHMCT
- Principal: Raja Sadhukhan
- Location: P-16, Taratala Road, Kolkata, Kolkata, West Bengal, India
- Campus: Urban
- Website: www.ihmkol.org

Institute of Hotel Management Catering Technology and Applied Nutrition, Kolkata, generally known as IHM Kolkata, is a hospitality management school located Kolkata, IHM Kolkata was founded in 1963 at its temporary road on 21, Convent Road. The institute was founded by Mr. P. A. Koshy. It was started with a total of 16 students only. In 1980 the campus was shifted to P-16, Taratala Road, Kolkata.

== About the Institute ==
IHM Kolkata is a co-educational institute offering Bachelor Degree program in Hospitality & Hotel Administration that is accredited jointly by National Council for Hotel Management, Noida and Jawaharlal Nehru University, New Delhi. IHM, Kolkata provides instruction in English to students of any race, nationality, sex, color, religion or creed who have successfully completed a full higher secondary school program.

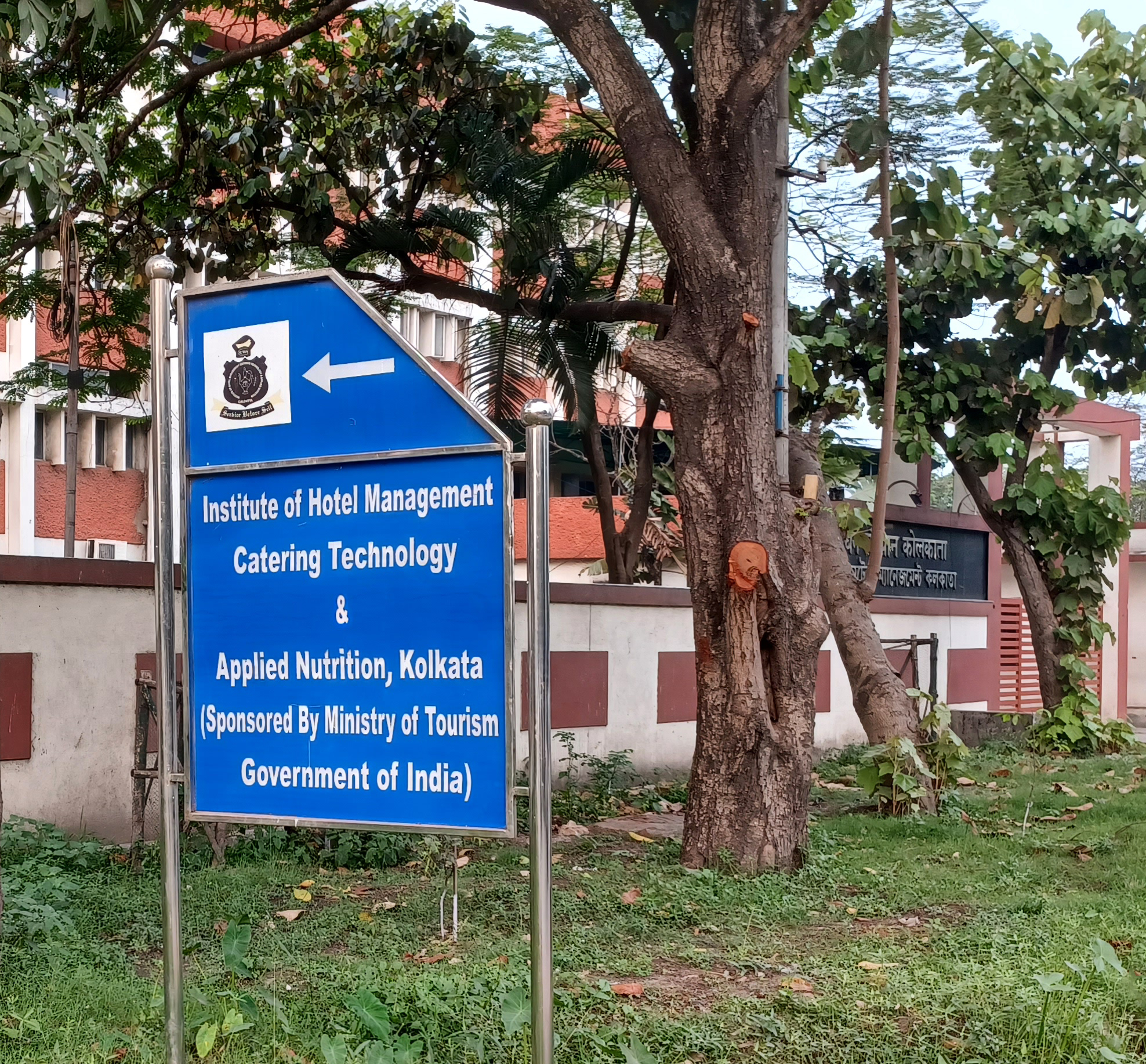
Signage near main gate of IHM Kolkata

== Courses ==
- 3 years Bachelor of Science (B.Sc.) in Hospitality and Hotel Administration
- 2 years Master of Science (M.Sc.) in Hospitality Administration
- 1 year Post-Graduate Diploma in Accommodation Operation And Management
- 24 weeks Craftsmanship Course In Food Production And Patisserie
- 24 weeks Craftsmanship Course in Food and Beverage service
- 1.5 years Diploma (Food Production, F&B Services, Housekeeping, Front Office).

== Admissions ==
The admission criteria on the undergraduate program is strictly merit based on the Boards Marks and NCHMCT JEE entrance exam conducted by the National Council for Hotel Management and Catering Technology (NCHMCT). The aspirant should minimum have passed 12th/senior secondary exam or is equivalent from any recognized board. Those appearing for 10+2 exams can also apply for the NCHMCT JEE to gain provisional admission (which may be withdrawn on failure to qualify 10+2). As per New Education Policy -2020, there is no Age Bar i. e. a Aspirant of any age can apply for the course.

== Vegetarian option ==
In 2016, IHM Ahmedabad, IHM Bhopal and IHM Jaipur started giving a student the option to choose only vegetarian cooking. All IHMCTANs, including IHM Kolkata started offering a vegetarian cooking option from academic year 2018 onwards.

== See also ==
- IHM Hajipur, Bihar
- IHM Guwahati, Assam
- IHM Faridabad, Haryana
- IHM Lucknow, Uttar Pradesh
- IHM Pusa, New Delhi
- IHM Jaipur, Rajasthan
