= Thangam Philip =

Indian nutritionist

- Born: 12 May 1921; Kozhikode, Kerala, India
- Died: 28 January 2009 (aged 87); Pallom, Kottayam, Kerala, India
- Resting place: St. Andrew's CSI Church, Pannimattom, Kottayam, Kerala, India; 9°32′2″N 76°31′25″E
- Occupations: Nutritionist, writer
- Known for: Hospitality education
- Parent(s): T. P. Philip; Elizabeth Philip
- Awards: Padma Shri; FAO Ceres Medal; Knighthood of the Order of Cordon Bleu Du Sant Esprit; Firestone Award

Thangam Elizabeth Philip (1921–2009) was an Indian nutritionist and a pioneer of hospitality education in India. She was the Principal Emeritus of the Institute of Hotel Management, Mumbai and was the author of several books on cookery. A recipient of the FAO Ceres Medal and the Knighthood of the Order of Cordon Bleu Du Sant Esprit of France, Philip was awarded the fourth highest Indian civilian award of Padma Shri by the Government of India in 1976.

== Biography ==
Thangam Philip was born on 12 May 1921 at Kozhikode in the south Indian state of Kerala in a central Travancore family by name, Thevarthundiyil, to T. P. Philip and Elizabeth Philip. After graduating from the Women's Christian College, Chennai, she secured a post graduate diploma from the Lady Irwin College, Delhi and secured a master's degree (MS) from USA. She started her career by joining the faculty of home science at St Thomas School, Kolkata where she worked for a short time before moving to Sri Lanka in 1949 to work at Southland Methodist College to establish a Home Economic department at the college.

Philip returned to India in 1950 and accepted the invitation of the Ministry of Agriculture to manage one of the cafeterias under the brand name, Annapurna, where subsidized food was served to the middle class. Five years later, she shifted to Mumbai and joined the Institute of Hotel Management, Catering Technology and Applied Nutrition (IHM) when the college was established in 1955. She also did radio and television programmes and visited US where her programmes were telecast. In 1961, after her return from US, she was appointed as the principal of IHM. She also started writing articles in the periodicals and opened a cookery programme at the All India Radio. When the Food and Agriculture Organization launched the Freedom from Hunger campaign in 1963, Thangam Philip also joined the campaign and participated in the inaugural Young World Assembly held in Athens in 1965.

Philip was the author of several books on cookery and hospitality industry. Her two volume work, Modern Book for Teaching and the Trade, is a prescribed textbook in IHM curriculum. One of her books, Thangam Philip's Book of Baking is a work written for the Ministry of Tourism. She also involved as a consultant with several projects of UNDP, Food and Agriculture Organization, International Labour Organization and the Government of Kuwait. She served on the boards of many hospitality enterprises and organizations such as Air India, Indian Institute of Tourism and Travel Management, Sterling Holiday Resorts (India) Limited and Kamat Hotels. She was also a member of the Remuneration Committee and Member of Shareholders’ Grievance Committee of the Kamat Hotel group.

Returning to her native place after retirement in 1986, she continued her research from her home in Pallom, in the Kottayam district of Kerala. Thangam Philip, who remained unmarried throughout her life, died on 28 January 2009, at the age of 87, of cardiac arrest which followed related illnesses at a nursing home in Kottayam. Her body was buried at St. Andrew's CSI Church cemetery at Pannimattom, Kottayam.

== Awards and honours ==
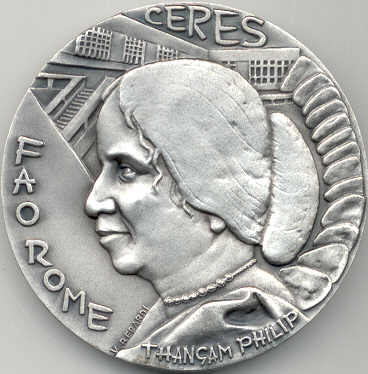
FAO CERES Philip Silver Obverse

Philip was a fellow of the Hotel Catering and Institutional Management Association, UK as well as the Cookery and Food Association, UK and served as a member of the Royal Society for Public Health, UK. The Food and Agriculture Organization selected her in 1975 to be honoured with the portrayal on the FAO Ceres Medal, a commemorative medal issued with the recipient's image. The next year, she received the civilian honour of Padma Shri from the Government of India. The Government of France awarded her the Knighthood of the Order of Cordon Bleu Du Sant Esprit in 1982. Four years later, she retired from IHM after which she was made the principal emeritus of the college. She was also a recipient of the Firestone Award from the Indian Association of Occupational Health.

== Bibliography ==
- Modern Cookery: For Teaching and the Trade (Volume 1)
- Modern Cookery: For Teaching and the Trade (Volume 2)
- A Touch Of Spice
- The Thangam Philip Book Of Baking
- Thangam Philip’s Vegetarian Recipes for Healthy Living

== See also ==
- Institute of Hotel Management, Catering Technology and Applied Nutrition, Mumbai
- Indian Cook Books
