= Institute of Hotel Management, Faridabad =

Hospitality school in India

- Institute of Hotel Management Catering & Nutrition, Faridabad
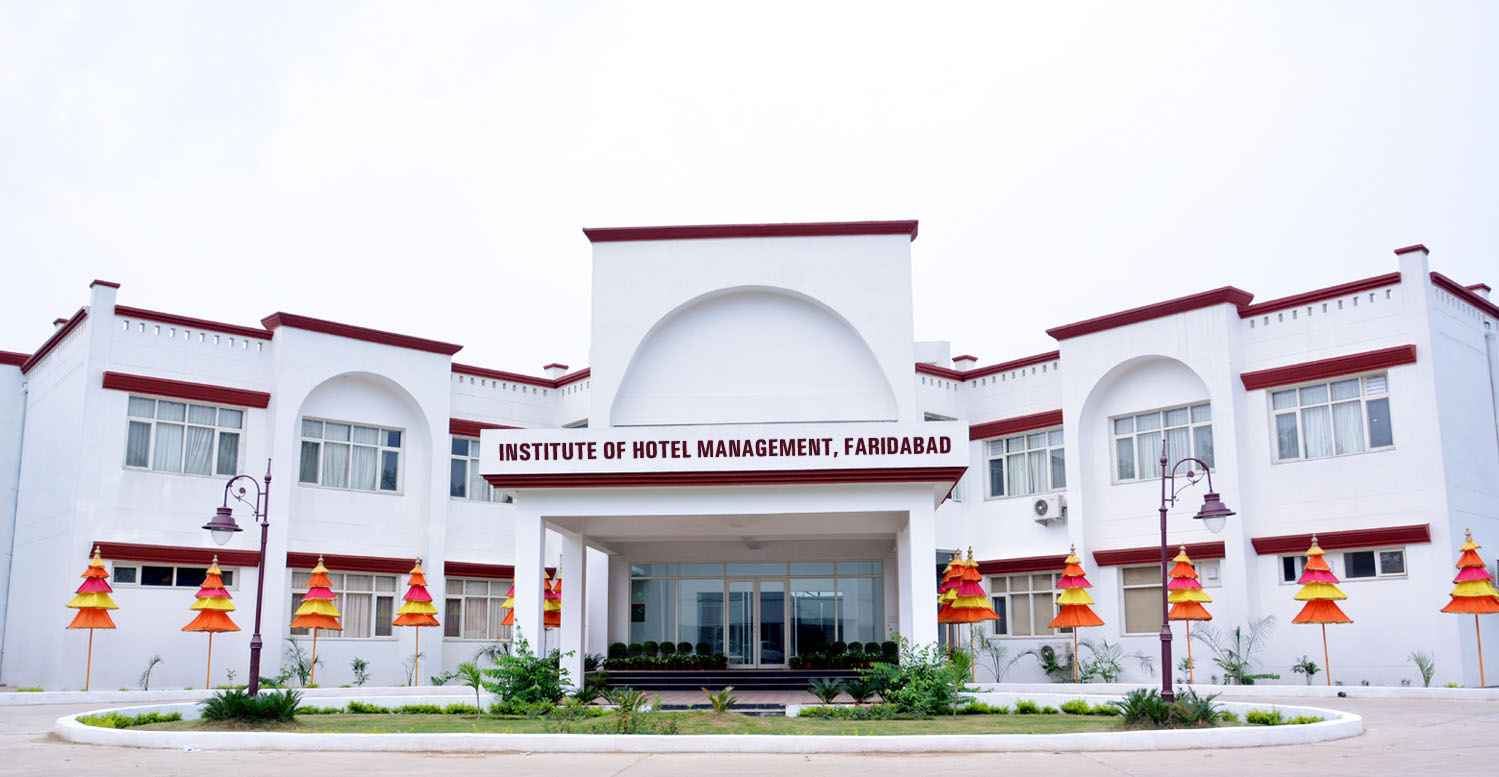
- Other names: IHM Faridabad
- Type: Hospitality management school
- Affiliations: Institute of Hotel Management; National Council for Hotel Management and Catering Technology
- Location: Faridabad, India
- Campus: Urban
- Website: ihmfaridabad.com

Institute of Hotel Management, Faridabad, Haryana, generally known as IHM Faridabad, is a Registered Society under Ministry of Tourism, Government of India and Department of Tourism, Government of Haryana. IHM Faridabad is situated at Badkhal Lake Tourist Resort, Faridabad, Haryana. It was previously known by the name of Food Craft Institute (FCI). It was upgraded to an Institute of Hotel Management in 2009 and is affiliated with National Council for Hotel Management, Noida. The institute has started his first batch by offering 21 seats. The batch started with nine students.

== History ==
The institute was established in 1989 and started functioning from August 1989.

== Award ==
Institute of Hotel Management was awarded as the ‘Best FCI’ in the country by Sujit Banerjee, secretary, Ministry of Tourism, Government of India and National Council for Hotel Management & Catering Technology for their best performance for academic year 2007–08 at IHM Pusa, New Delhi on 25 March 2009. Principal of the institute, H.S. Dewan received the prize. He has been the principal of Institute of Hotel Management, Faridabad (Formerly Food Craft Institute) since 1992.

== Programs ==
The institute offers the following programs of study:

- B.Sc Hospitality & Hotel Administration Program - 3 years
- Diploma in Food Production - 1 ½ years
- Diploma in Food & Beverage Service - 1 ½ years
- Diploma in Housekeeping - 1 ½ years

== Industrial training ==
The Degree students have to undergo a six-month industrial training at a hotel, during their program of study, to get a feel of how the industry functions.

== Vegetarian Option ==
In 2016, a few of the IHMCTANs (Ahmedabad, Bhopal, Jaipur) started giving a hotel management student the option to choose only vegetarian cooking. This decision to offer a vegetarian option by IHMCTANs could possibly be the first amongst any of the hospitality training institutes of the world. It is expected that all IHMCTANs, including IHMCTAN Faridabad, will start offering a vegetarian cooking option from academic year 2018 onwards.
