= Bharat Parv =

Cultural festival in India

Bharat Parv is a five-day festival organised by Ministry of Tourism (India), Government of India to showcase the cuisine and culture of different states of India. The festival is held annually at the end of January.
