= Institute of Hotel Management, Catering & Nutrition =

Hotel management school in Delhi

- Other names: IHM Delhi, IHM Pusa
- Type: Hospitality management school
- Established: 1962
- Affiliations: Institute of Hotel Management; National Council for Hotel Management and Catering Technology
- Principal: Mrs. Meenakshi Sumbly
- Location: Pusa, Central Delhi, India
- Campus: Urban
- Website: www.ihmpusa.net

The Institute of Hotel Management, Catering & Nutrition, also known as IHM Pusa or IHM Delhi, is a hotel management institute in Pusa, Central Delhi, India.

== Rankings & Awards ==
The institute has been ranked as the number one Hotel Management institute in India by the Ministry of Tourism, Government of India for several years. It has also been ranked as a top hotel management institute by news agencies such as Outlook and Hindustan Times. There has been competition between IHM Mumbai and IHM Pusa for the first place in rankings.

== Vegetarian Option ==
In 2016, three IHMCTANs - Ahmedabad, Bhopal and Jaipur - started giving a student the option to choose only vegetarian cooking. In 2018, the National Council for Hotel Management (NCHM) announced that all IHMs will provide a vegetarian option beginning academic year 2018. This decision to offer a vegetarian option by IHMCTANs may be the first amongst any of the hospitality training institutes of the world. IHMCTAN at Pusa had already been practicing with vegan cooking through "vegan months" and sustainability practices such as rainwater harvesting.

== University ==
National Institute of Hotel Management (NIHM Delhi), under IHMCTAN was granted an autonomous institute and deemed university status in February 2026.

== Notable alumni ==
- Sanjeev Kapoor
- Vivek Singh (chef)
- Rakesh Sethi (chef)
- Manjit Gill
- Madhulika Liddle

== See also ==
Institute of Hotel Management
