= Indian cookbooks =

Cookbooks from or about India

Indian cookbooks are cookbooks written in India, or about Indian cooking. Indian cooking varies regionally and has evolved over the centuries due to various influences. Vegetarianism has made a significant impact on Indian cooking and spices play a major role as well.

== Early Indian texts and cookbooks ==
=== Ayurvedic Samhitas (4th century BCE) ===
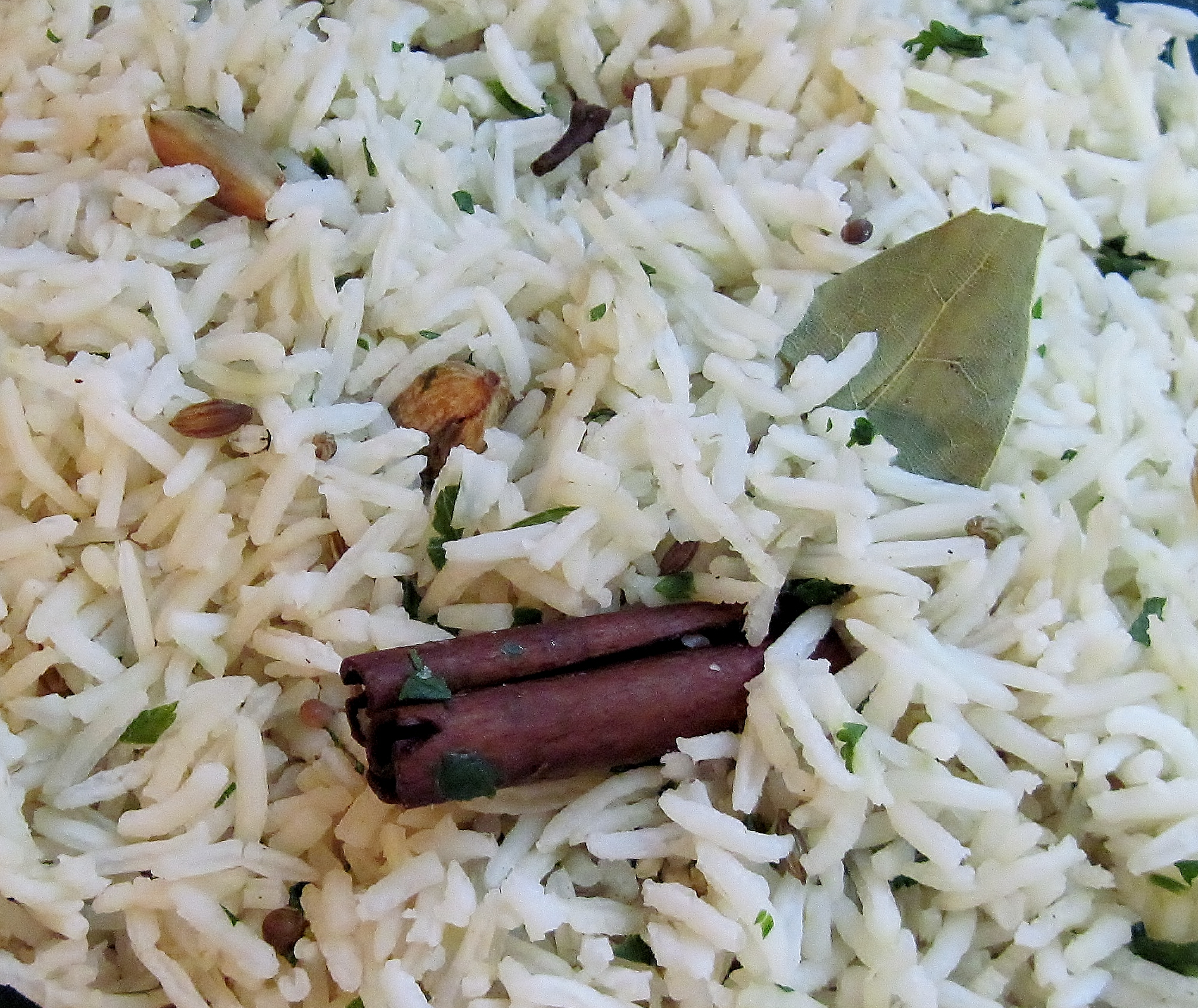
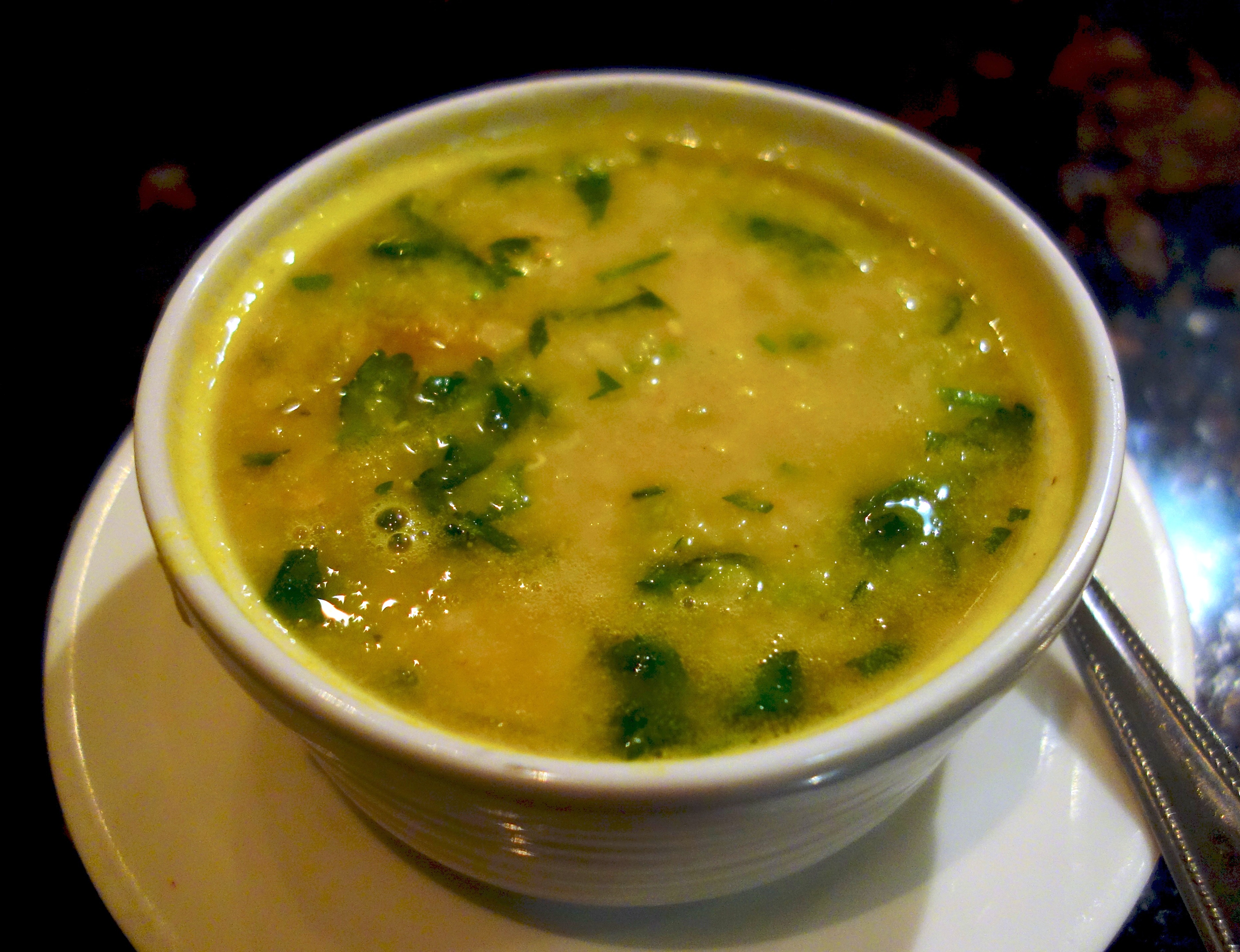
Left: Rice. Ayurvedic texts classifies rice varieties into 14 types of Śāli and different ways to cook them. Right: Yusha (a lentil dish) in ancient Ayurvedic texts was staple dal dish.
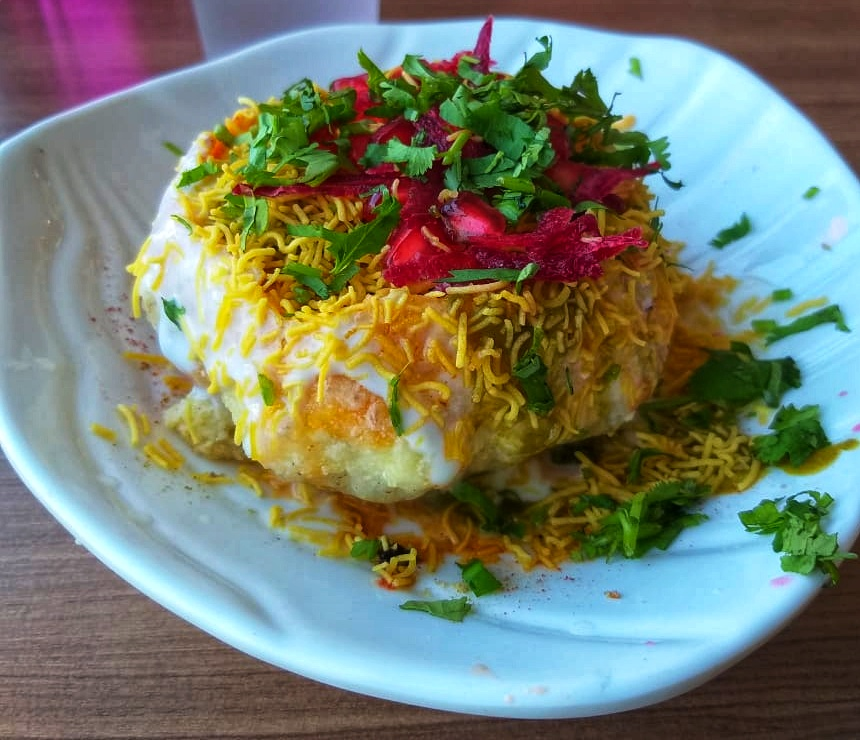
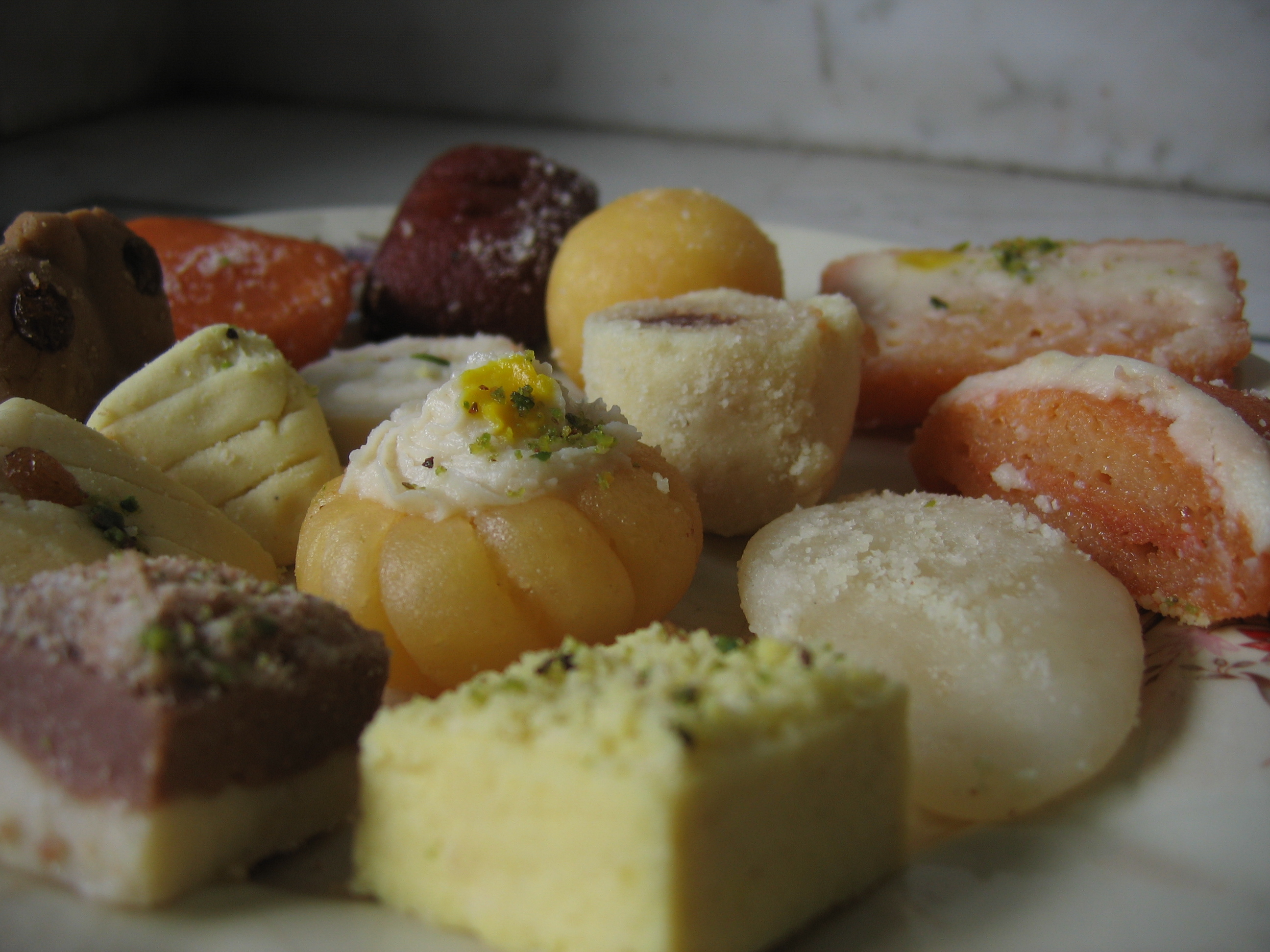
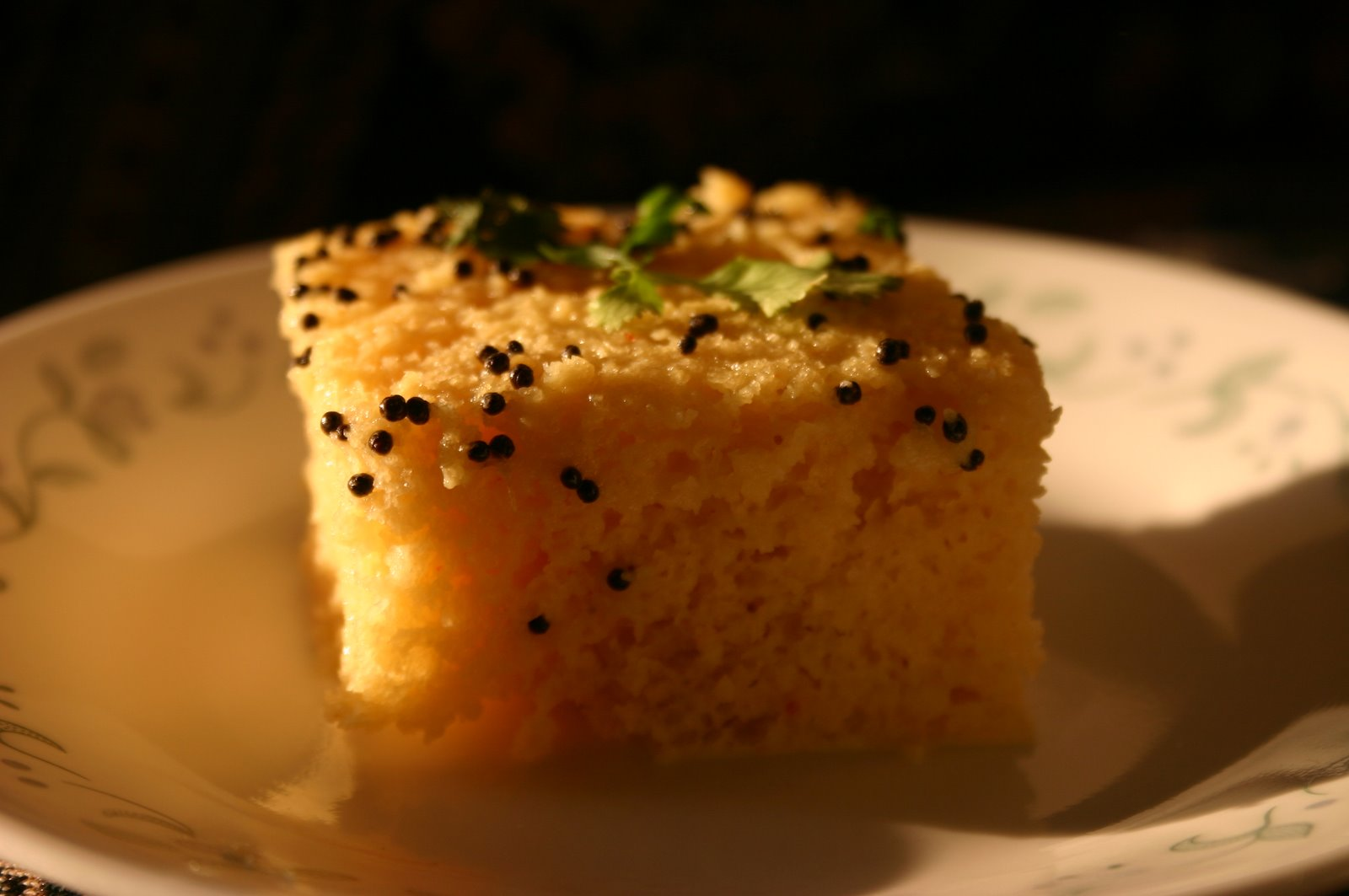
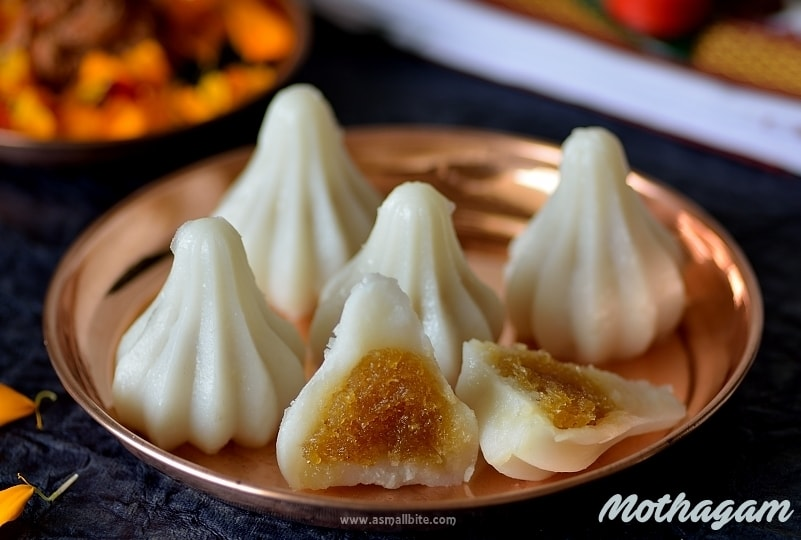
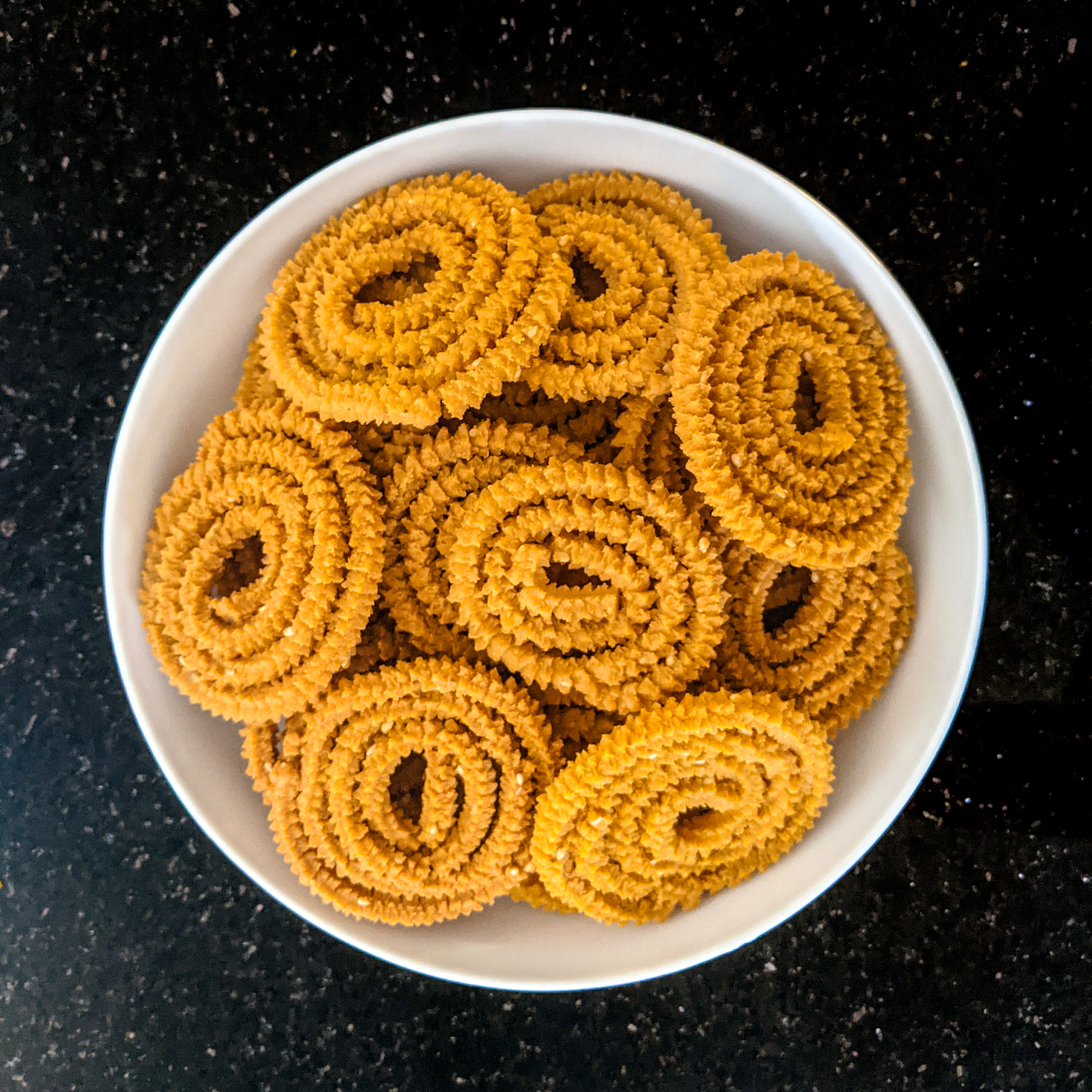
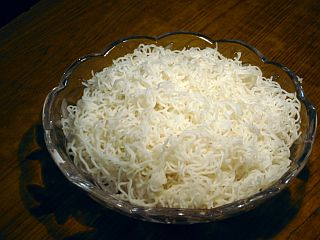
Examples of dishes mentioned in ancient and medieval period cookbooks and that are part of the modern Indian tradition; clockwise from top left: Kachori, Mithai (sweets), Dhokla, Modak, Chakli, Sevai.
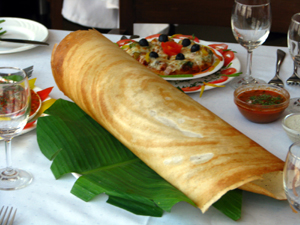
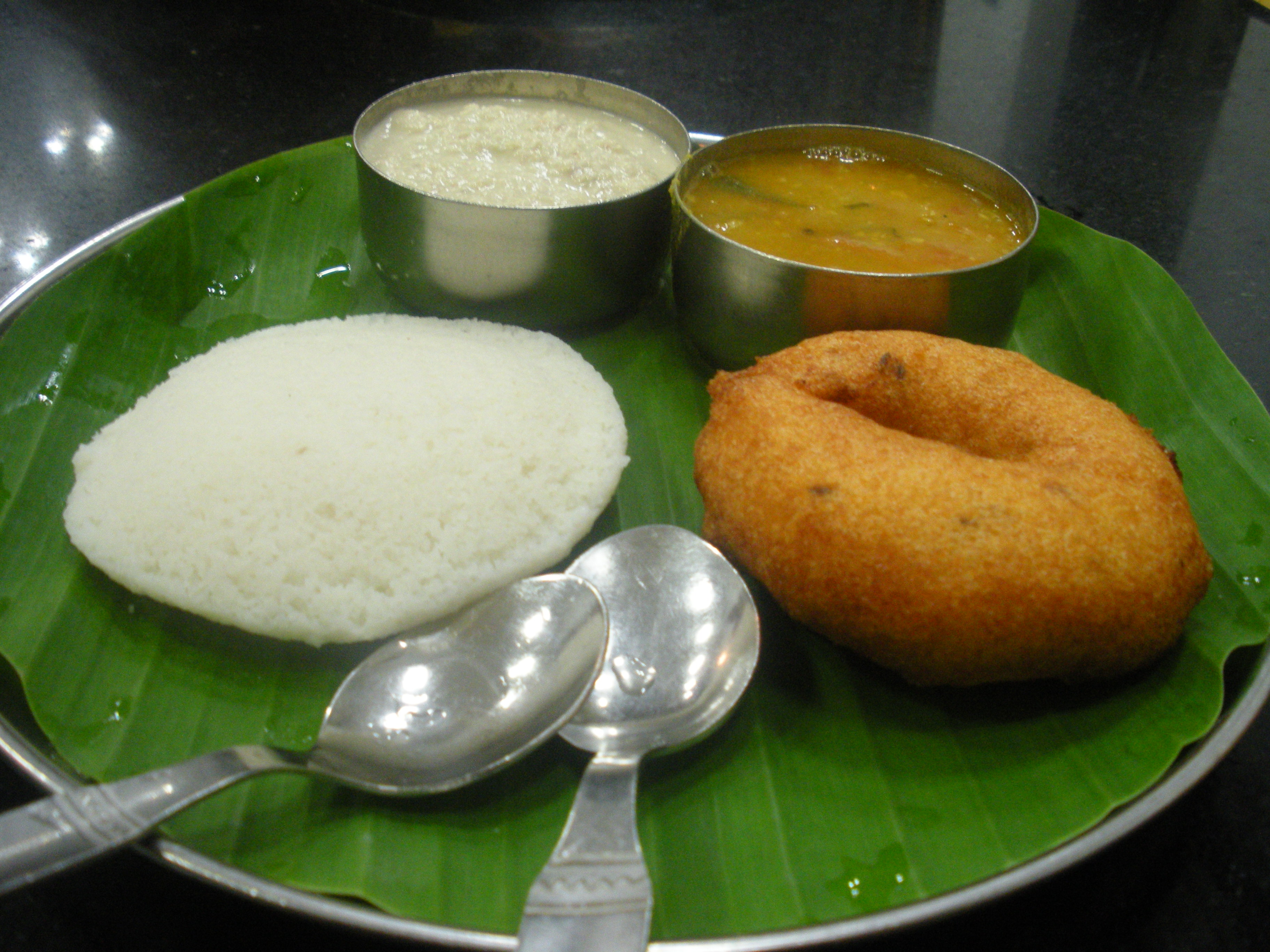
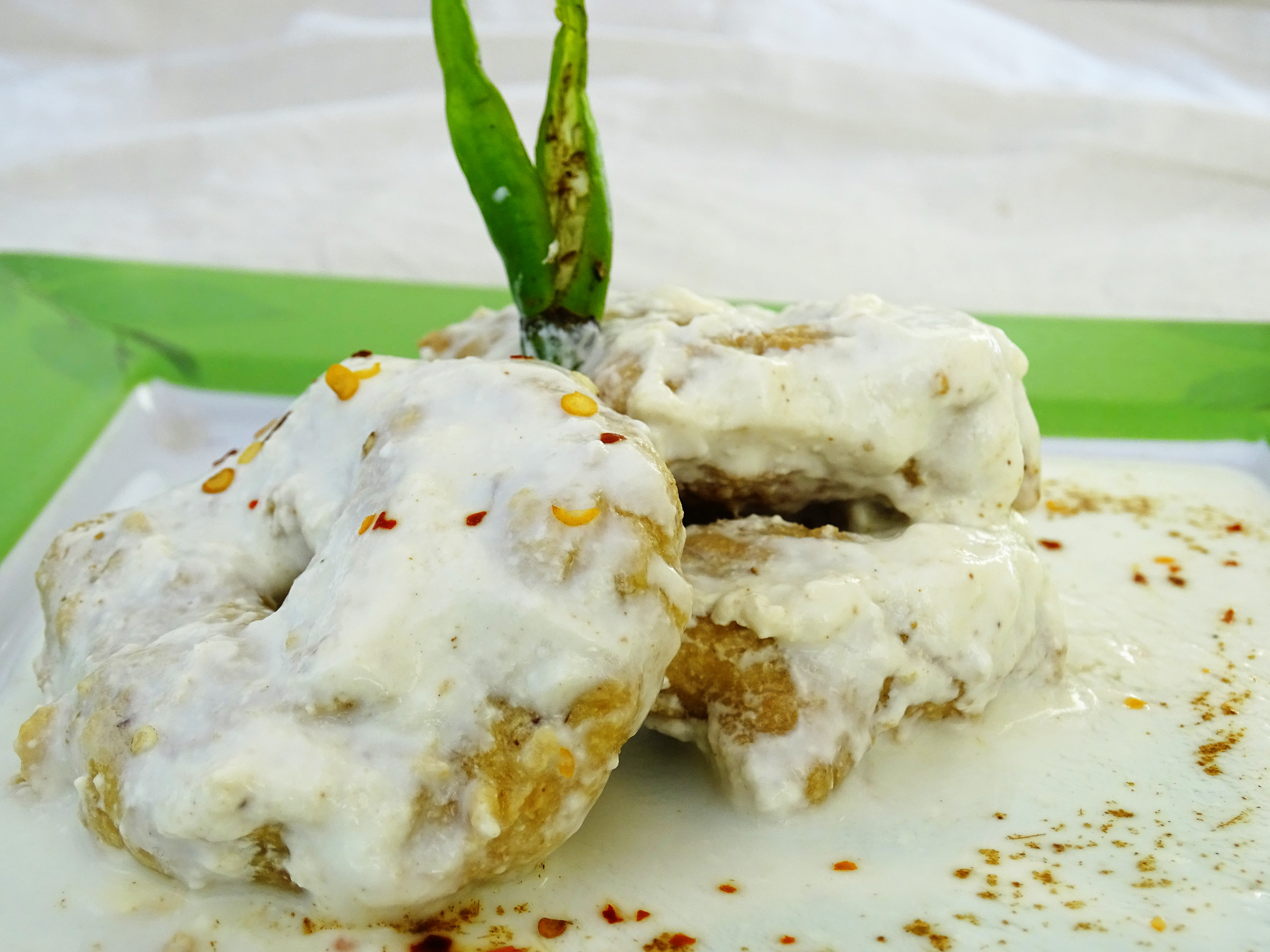
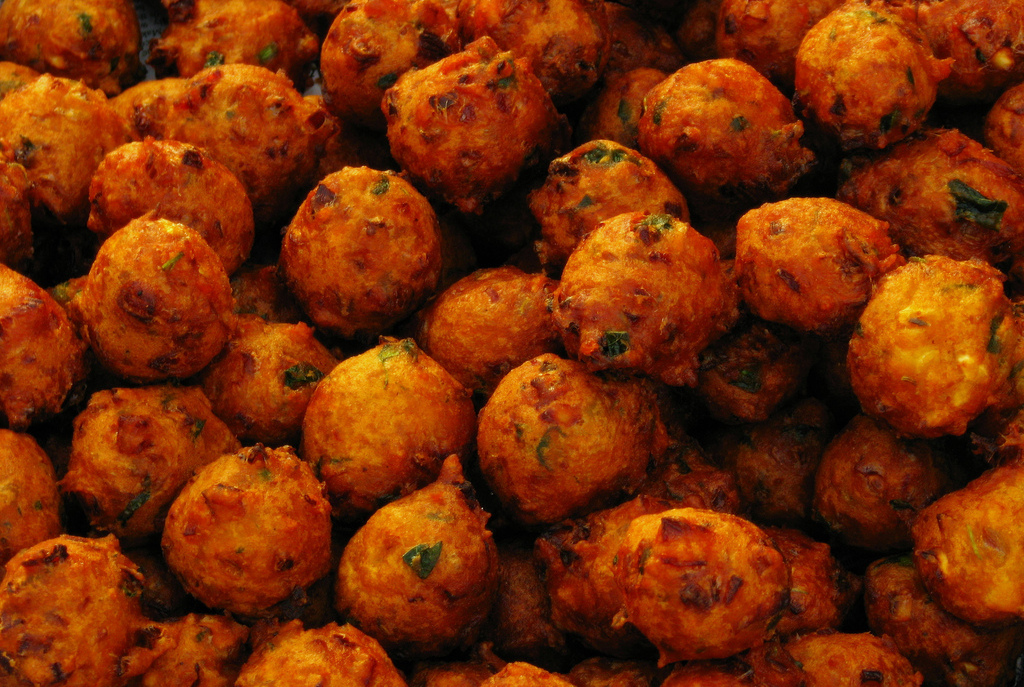
The 12th-century Manasollasa describes foods that continue to be part of modern Indian tradition. Above clockwise from top left in Sanskrit: Dosaka (Dosa), Iddarika and Vataka (Idli and vada), Parika (pakoda) and Kshiravata (Dahi vada).

Ayurvedic texts classify food into three categories: sattvic, rajasic, and tamasic. Tastes (rasa) are classified into six types known as shadrasa according to their qualities for an ideal meal: sweet, salty, sour, pungent, bitter, and astringent. Traditional meal presentation often includes all six of these qualities. Several samhitas from Ayurvedic texts describe and discuss methods for cooking food. They mention recipes for cooking rice in different ways, some examples include:

- Tāpaharī, a seasoned rice dish
- Māṃsaudana, rice cooked with meat
- Mudgaudana, rice cooked with mung beans
- Kṣīraudana, rice cooked with milk
- Tilaudana, rice seasoned with sesame seeds
- Khichadi, a rice and lentil dish
- Dadhyodana, rice mixed with yogurt
- Takra, a curd dish
- Yusha, a lentil dish
- Vesavara, a dish made with ground meat

The texts also mention different methods to cook grains, pulses, meats, milk products, vegetables, fruits, leafy greens, roots, oils, and sugarcane products to prepare foods. They describe varieties of meat recipes such as:

- Śūlyamāṃsa, a roast meat dish cooked on a skewer
- Ullupta, a dish made with ground meat
- Bharjita, in which the meat is fried
- Pishta in which meat is made into balls or patties
- Pratapta, in which meat is roasted with clarified butter over a charcoal fire
- Kandupachita, in which meat is dipped in mustard oil and powdered, aromatic condiments, then roasted over a charcoal fire until it reaches a honey-like color
- Parishushka and Pradigdha go by the general name of Śūlya, or meat cooked over a charcoal fire

Among spice blends, the texts list:

- Trikatu: a mixture of long pepper, black pepper, and dried ginger
- Trijataka: a mixture of cinnamomum tamala, cardamom, and cinnamon
- Pancakola: a mixture of long pepper, long-pepper roots, piper chaba, plumbago zeylanica and dry ginger

These spice blends are mentioned alongside turmeric, cumin seeds, coriander seeds, dried mango, mustard seeds, and edible camphor. The blends also appear in medieval cookbooks under the same names.

A chapter in Sushruta Samhita is dedicated to dining etiquette, methods of serving food, and the proper placement of each dish before the diner. This dining and serving etiquette was also adopted in medieval cookbooks with some variations.

=== Sangam literature (3rd century BCE to c. 3rd century CE) ===
Sangam literature offers references to food and recipes during this era, whether for a feast at a king's palace, meals in towns or the countryside, or in forest hamlets and the rest-houses travels visit. The literature describes in detail the cuisine of various landscapes and the people who reside there, how they prepared food, and what they served their guests. The poet Avvaiyar, for example, describes her hearty summer lunch as "steamed rice, smoked and mashed aubergine, and tangy, frothy buttermilk," while the poet Mudathama Kanniyar describes "Skewered goat meat, crispy fried vegetables, rice and over 16 varieties of dishes" as part of the royal lunch he was treated to in the palace of the Chola king.

=== Lokopakara (1025 CE) ===
Written by Chavundaraya, this cookbook is compilation of vegetarian recipes. It deals with methods of cooking rice, lentils, pulses, barley, wheat, vegetables, leafy greens, shoots, roots, and flowers. The book explains different methods of using spices and making blends for recipes; types of cookware and choosing different vessels for different recipes; preserving food and fruits to make pickles and papad; methods of making butter and ghee and different ways to season them; and ingredient substitutions. There is also a chapter about making flavored yogurts and coagulated buffalo milk cheese for sweets and sweets made from rice flour. The last chapter is dedicated to beverages made from different types of fruits and ways to season them.

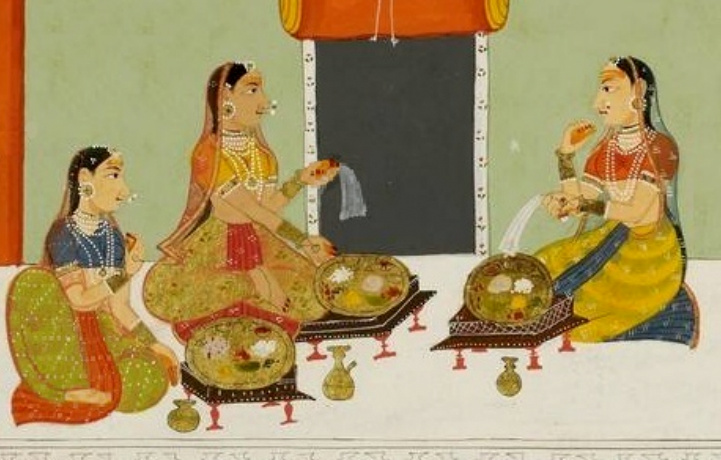
Women having a traditional meal from Thali, ca. 1712

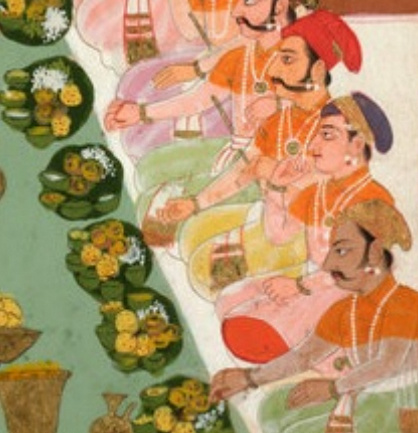
Men having a traditional meal from Pattal, ca. 1712

=== Manasollasa (1130 CE) ===
This notable text was compiled during the rule of the Chalukya king Someshvara III in 1130 CE, and contains recipes for vegetarian and non-vegetarian dishes. It also contains a range of recipes based on fermentation of cereals and flours. Among meat dishes, the text describes recipes based on pork, venison, goat meat, wild fowl, and fish, among others. It has been suggested that Vaddaradhane, the Kannada text of Jain Acharya Sivakoti written in 920 CE, contains what may be the earliest mention of Idali, followed by Manasollasa. This text also has a chapter dedicated to brewing various types of alcoholic beverages.

=== Pakadarpana (1200 CE) ===
This recipe book—also known as Pākadarpaṇam, Pākaśāstra, Pākakalā, and Nalapāka—deals with culinary arts. It consists of 11 chapters known as Prakaraṇas. It explains both vegetarian and non-vegetarian food preparation and provides details about several methods for cooking rice, meat, legumes, pulses, vegetables, fruits, refreshments, beverages, and milk products. The text also includes:

- Among non-vegetarian rice preparations, several different kinds of maṁsodana/maṁsānna (meat and rice dishes), lāvaka maṁsodana, and kukkuṭa maṁsodana (chicken and rice dishes).
- Methods for preparing food according to the seasons, including seasoning food with in-season spices.
- Explanations for preparing various vegetables using different parts of the plants.
- Methods for sūpa (shuked, cooked legumes), horse gram (Dolichos biflorus), black gram (Vigna mungo), cow peas (Vigna unguiculata), and chickpeas (Vicer arietinum).
- Several pānakas (beverages) made from mango, lemon, kokum, flowers, and berries.
- Sweets made from milk products such as various types of flavored milk, flavored buttermilk, pasyasam, and flavored yogurts.

=== Soopa Shastra (1508 CE) ===
Written by Mangarasa III, a follower of Jainism, the Soopa Shastra is exclusively vegetarian. It provides ingredients and cooking methods in detail, and even the types of utensils and ovens needed are mentioned. King Mangarasa III belonged to the Chengalvu dynasty, and was under the suzerainty of the Hoysala kings.

- The first chapter describes 35 breads, sweets and snacks, which are now mostly obsolete.
- The second chapter describes salty, sour, and sweet drinks.
- The third chapter discusses nine types of payasa (kheer), eight types of cooked rice, and 24 rice dishes.
- The next three chapters include recipes for 20 dishes with eggplant, 16 dishes with jackfruit, and 25 dishes made with raw bananas (plantains) and banana flowers.
- The last chapter contains recipes using bamboo shoots and myrobalan.

Even though the book was written during the rule of a Jain ruler, some of the vegetarian ingredients mentioned, such as onions, are regarded as inappropriate for strict Jains.

The Pishtakadhyaya chapter mentions foods made with flour like roti, mandige, garige, dosa, and idli. Although ancient Kannada poetry has used the term 'rotika' even earlier.

=== Kshemakutuhala (1549 CE) ===
Written by Ksemasarma, this cookbook deals with both vegetarian and non-vegetarian recipes. Among non-vegetarian recipes, it includes boar, lamb, goat, venison, rabbit, wild and domesticated pigs, game birds, peacocks, fish, and tortoise. It lists nine methods of cooking meat. The Kshemakutuhala provides:

- Different methods of cooking rice, pulses, and lentils
- Information on spice mixtures and the effects of adding them at different points while cooking
- Methods for using different cookware for different recipes
- Recipes for preparing milk products making sweets from them
- Methods for cooking edible vegetables, leafy greens, flowers, fruits, stalks, bulbs and roots in what is the book's longest chapter.
- Beverage recipes.

=== Bhojana Kutuhala (1675 CE) ===
The Bhojana Kutuhala, written by Raghunatha between 1675 and 1700, describes numerous ingredients and dishes then common in the Maharashtra region. The text compiles knowledge about food and cooking described in the Sanskrit texts from the ancient period (up to 5th century CE) and the medieval period (5th to 17th century CE). The second chapter is a historical study of dietetics and culinary art. The treatises like Kṣemakutūhala of Kṣemaśarman and Pākadarpaṇa of Naḷa, which exclusively discuss the topics of dietetics and culinary art, are introduced in the third chapter. The sixth chapter mainly discusses the preparations of various dishes as explained in the Siddhānnaprakaraṇa. The last chapter is a summary of the study of cooking, comprising discussions and observations.

Bhojana Kutuhala records and credits many earlier culinary cookbooks like:

- Pākādhikāra of Vaidaksara
- Takravidhi of Rudrayāmala
- Bhimabhojanakutuhala of Vaidyadesika
- Rucivadhugalaratnamala of Paraparnava
- Tambulakapasamgraha of Narasimhabhatta
- Vyañjanavarga of Suṣeṇa
- Pakadhikarana
- Kriradiprakarana
- Vastugunahuna
- Sakaguna
- Annapanavidhi
- Takrapanavidhi
- Pakamartanda
- Vividha Pakabhasmatailadiniramana
- Yogacintamani
- Takrakalpa
- Tambulamanjari
- Pakavali

It also mentions several important treatises, including Paroygaparijata, Kriyasara Vaidyakasabdasindhu, and Hrdayadipaand Vyanjanavarga. The majority of these have not been published in English, while those that have been published lack critical studies.

=== Sivatattva Ratnakara (1699 CE) ===
This work by Basava Bhoopāla is an encyclopedic treatise in Sanskrit. The sixth chapter in this text is dedicated to culinary art; it is an extensive chapter containing 27 sections known as tarangas. This chapter deals with kitchen and how it should be built, different types of stoves, organizing the kitchen, kitchen implements and how to make them, cooking utensils, and types of pots and pans and their benefits. It also describes types of rice and different methods of cooking rice, seasoned rice recipes, vegetarian and non-vegetarian recipes, sweets made from dairy products, and beverages.

== Sultanate and Mughal period cookbooks ==
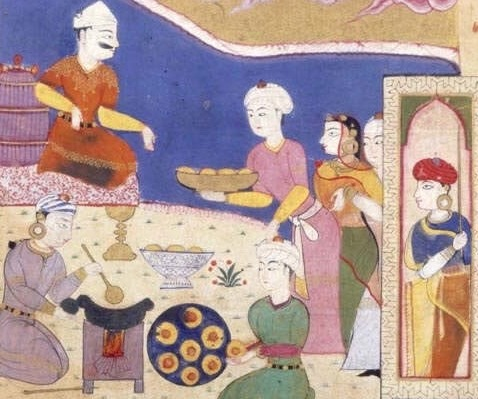
Samosas being prepared for the Sultan Ghiyath al-Din, the Sultan of Mandu. The Ni'matnama-i Nasir al-Din Shah, 1495–1505

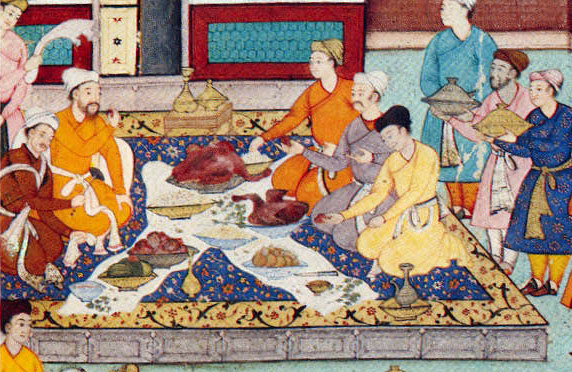
Babur at Dastarkhan, Mughal painting, 1590 CE.

Under the Turkic Sultanate and Mughal period, several new foods were introduced like samosas, naan, yahni, korma, kebab, keema, halva, haleem, and Jalebi.

=== The Ni'matnama (c. 1500) ===
The Ni'matnama is a collection of the recipes written during the rule of the Malwa Sultanate, Ghiyath Shahi, and his son and successor, Nasir Shah. It contains recipes for food, medicine, and aphrodisiacs. It also includes a sections on preparing betel leaves. and information on unique pickles made from edible flowers. There are recipes for preparing ground meat, samosas, halva, and sherbets.

=== Ain-i-Akbari (1590) ===
The first book of Ain-i-Akbari (the third volume of the Akbarnama), written in 1590, gives several recipes, mainly those popular among the Mughal elite. Ain-i-Akbari divides recipes into three categories of sufiyana: meat-free dishes, meat-and-rice dishes, and meats cooked with spices.

=== Alwan-e-Nemat (17th century) ===
Alwan-e-Nemat is a book of 101 recipes from the kitchen of Mughal emperor Jahangir. It also dedicates a chapter to dining etiquette. The book describes the method for laying out Dastarkhan: a process that starts with spreading a leather mat spread over the ornate carpet to protect it, and then spreading a cloth over the mat before arranging prepared foods at the center. People at the time ate together from large, common plates similar to Central Asian customs.

=== Nuskha-e-Shahjahani ===
This work includes Pilaf recipes from Shah Jahan's reign.

== British period ==
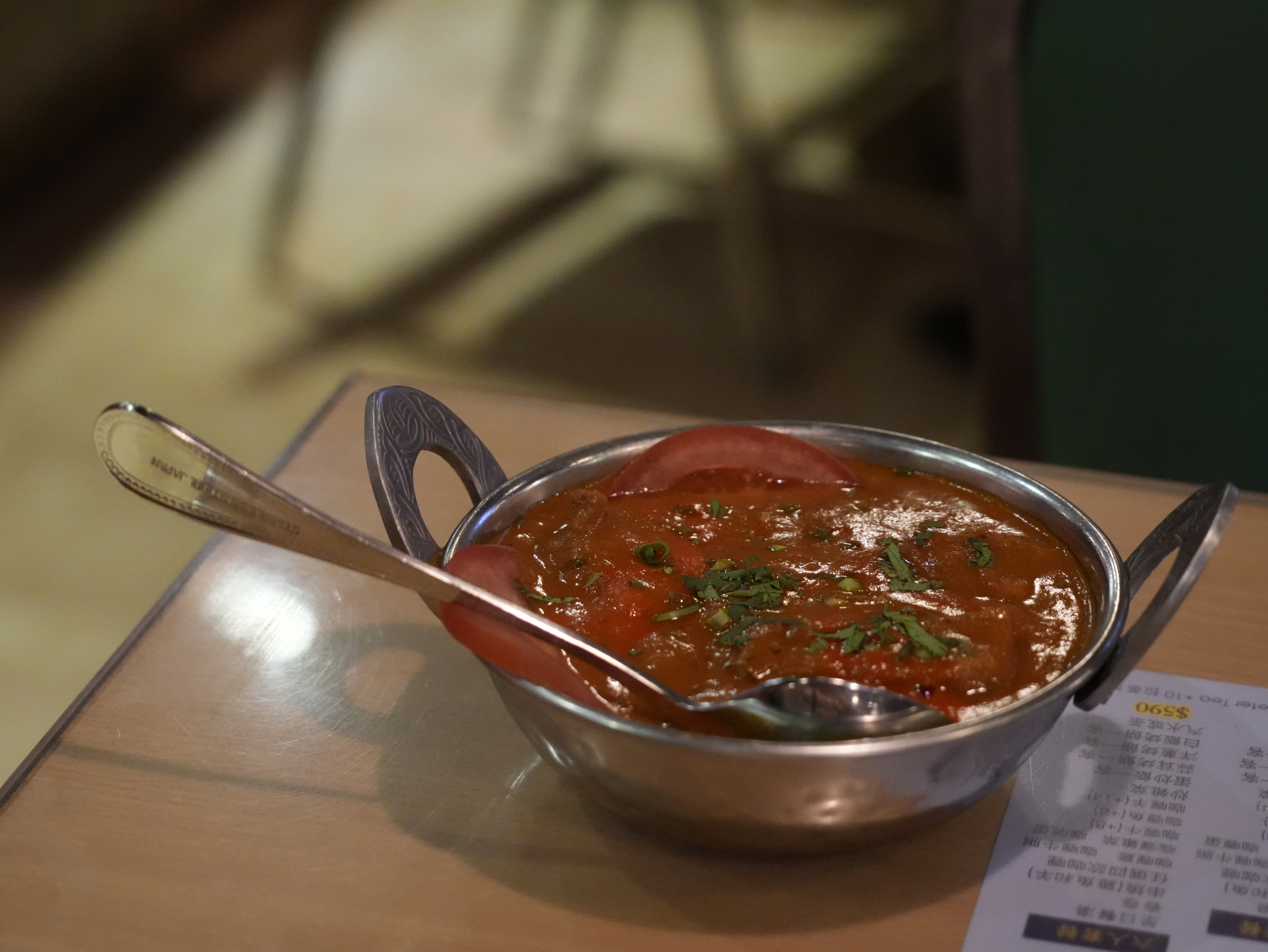
Curry as it is known today emerged during this period when New World ingredients like chili peppers and tomato became popular.

British rule saw the publication of several cookbooks, some intended for the British elite, others for locals, often in languages like Gujarati, Bengali and Hindi. These include:

- Sarabhendra Pakasasthram (1816–1825) in Marathi
- Pak-Shastra (1878) in Gujarati
- Culinary Jotting for Madras (1891) by Wyvern, later republished as Wyvern's Indian Cookery.
- Mistanna Pak (1904) in Bengali
- Bengal Sweets (1921) by Haldar
- Recipes-Of-All-Nations (1923) by Countess Morphy, has an Indian section that mentions gulgula, halwa, and khoa.
- Pak Chandrika (1929) by Maniram Sharma in Hindi
- Indian Cookery (1930s) by Veeraswamy who established England's oldest existing Indian restaurant.
- Vrahad Pak Vigyan (1939) Pandit Nrisinghram in Hindi
- Navin-Pak shastra

"English vegetables" (cabbage, cauliflower, tomato, turnip, etc.) as they were at one time termed, became common during this period.

The 1939 cookbook Vrahad Pak Vigyan, written in Hindi, has a special section on "Angreji" (i.e., English) cooking that includes biscuits, breads ("double-roti"), tomato, and mushroom dishes in addition to meat and egg dishes (termed "non-vegetarian" in India).

== Freedom struggle and Indian independence ==
The following cookbooks were published during India's struggle for independence and after India achieved independence from Britain:

- Dalda Cookbook (1949): An illustrated, best-seller published in English, Hindi, Tamil and Bengali by Dalda Advisory Service. Its Pakistani counterpart is still being published.
- Modern Cookery Vo.l I by Thangam Philip (1946)
- Indian Cooking by Savitri Chawdhary (1954) written by an Indian housewife who immigrated to England.
- Pak Ratnakar (1958)

== Internationalization of Indian cooking ==
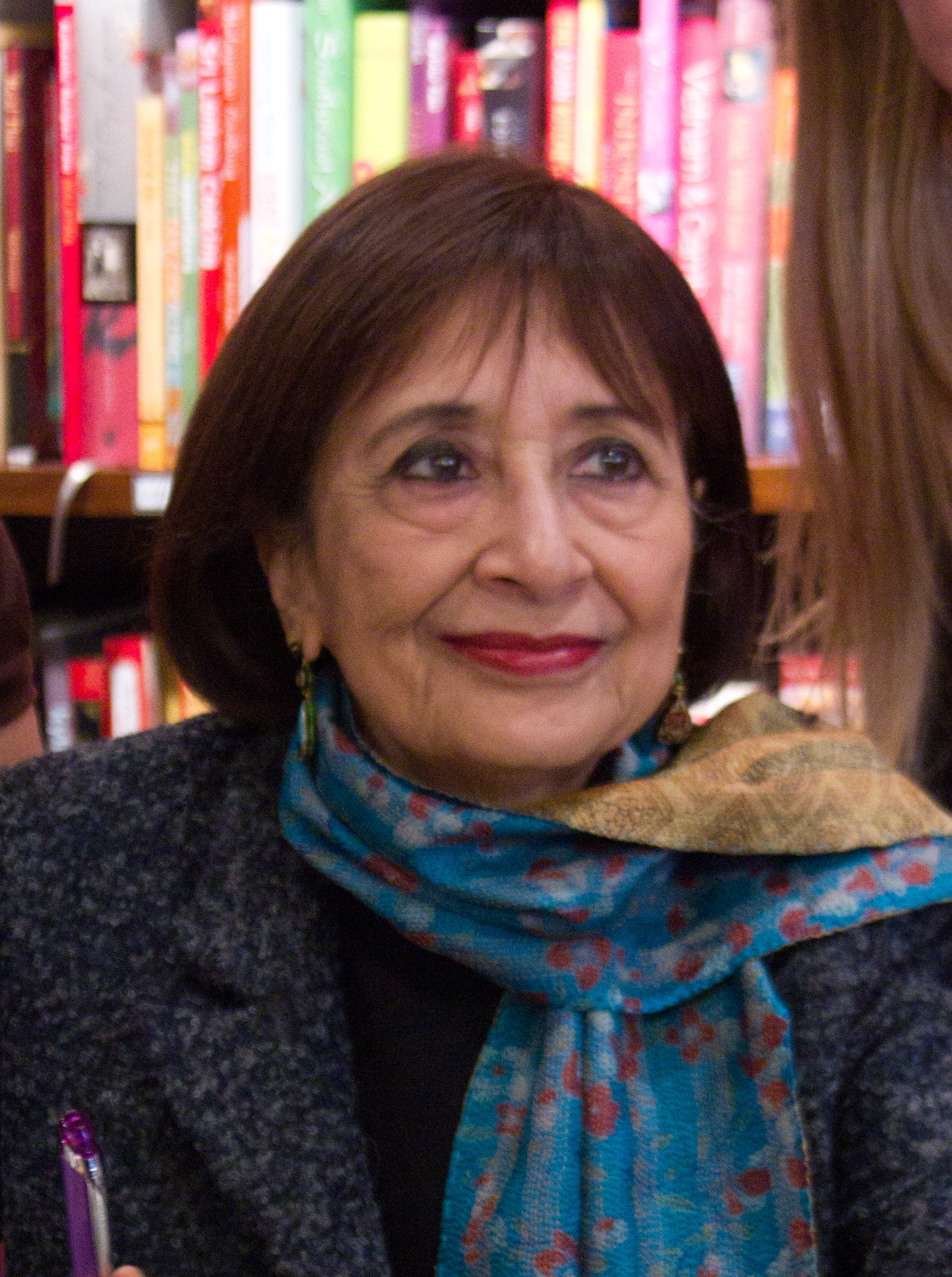
Cookbook author Madhur Jaffrey at a book signing in Vancouver, 2010

With large-scale migration of Indians to North America, and with India's increasing international influence, a new set of cookbook authors emerged:

- An Invitation to Indian Cooking, Madhur Jaffrey, (1973), who has since then written a series of popular cook books.
- Classic Indian Cooking, by Julie Sahni (1980), the founder of the Indian Cooking School, established 1973 in New York City.
- Lord Krishna's Cuisine: The Art of Indian Vegetarian Cooking by Yamuna Devi (1987)

With the advent of TV and the internet, new food authors have emerged in the past few decades. There is significant international influence because International travel has become common. These include:

- The Pleasures of Vegetarian Cooking, Tarla Dalal (1974), followed by 170 other cookbook titles

== See also ==
- Cuisine
- Culinary art
- Food preparation
- Food writing
- Recipe
