= Swapna Liddle =

Indian historian

- Education: Ph.D.
- Alma mater: St. Stephen’s College of Delhi University (B.A.), Jawaharlal Nehru University (M.A. and M.Phil.), Jamia Millia Islamia (Ph.D.)
- Occupations: Historian; writer; art curator; heritage conservator
- Relatives: Madhulika Liddle (sister)

Swapna Liddle is an Indian historian, author, art curator and heritage conservator based in Delhi.

== Education ==
Liddle did her B.A. from St. Stephen’s College of Delhi University, M.A. and M.Phil. at the Centre for Historical Studies of Jawaharlal Nehru University, and Ph.D. from Jamia Millia Islamia.

== Career ==
Liddle is known for her research of history of Delhi including its architecture and buildings, and food. Liddle is an art curator. She advocates people's participation to help preserve heritage. Liddle was the convener of the Delhi Chapter of Indian National Trust for Art and Cultural Heritage (INTACH) previously. She contributed to The Delhi College: Traditional Elites, the Colonial State, and Education before 1857 and edited Sair-Ul-Manazil.

== Books ==
- Shahjahanabad: Mapping a Mughal City, Chandni Chowk: The Mughal City of Old Delhi. Publisher: Roli Books.
- The Broken Script. Publisher: Speaking Tiger Books.
- Chandni Chowk: The Mughal City of Old Delhi. Publisher: Speaking Tiger Books.
- Connaught Place and the Making of New Delhi. Publisher: Speaking Tiger Books.
- Delhi: 14 Historic Walks. Publisher: Westland Books.
- Two Delhis, Old and New. Publisher: HarperCollins India.
