= Madhulika Liddle =

Indian writer (born 1973)

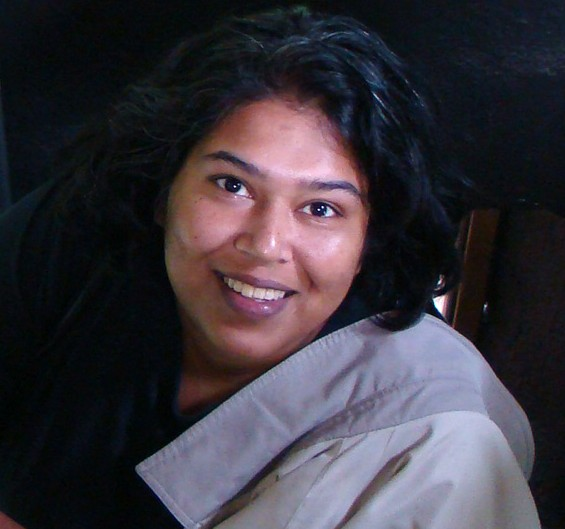
- Born: January 8, 1973 (age 53)
- Occupation: Writer
- Relatives: Swapna Liddle (sister)
- Website: madhulikaliddle.com

Madhulika Liddle (born 8 January 1973) is an Indian writer best known for her books about 17th-century Mughal detective Muzaffar Jang.

== Education and personal life ==
Liddle was born in the town of Haflong in Assam, India, the younger of the two daughters of Andrew Verity Liddle and his wife Muriel Liddle. Andrew Liddle was an officer in the Indian Police Service, which meant that he would be transferred to a new town every two or three years. Therefore, the first twelve years of Liddle's life were spent in various towns across Assam. In 1985 her father was posted to New Delhi, and Liddle completed her schooling in that city. She went on to study at the Institute of Hotel Management, Catering and Nutrition (IHMCN) in New Delhi. Liddle is married to Tarun Bhandari, and the couple has a daughter. They reside in Noida, India. Her sister, Swapna Liddle, is a historian known for her work on the history and urban development of Delhi.

Liddle worked at the India Habitat Centre in Delhi, followed by an advertising agency, and resigned from NIIT in 2008 to write full-time. Liddle's first work to be published was a short story named Silent Fear, which won the Femina Thriller Contest in June 2001.

=== The Muzaffar Jang series ===
Liddle's best-known series of works are historical whodunnits featuring 17th century Mughal detective Muzaffar Jang. Muzaffar Jang first appeared in print in a short story, Murk of Art, in the anthology, 21 Under 40, published by Zubaan Books in 2007. The first full-length Muzaffar Jang novel was published by Hachette India in 2009 as The Englishman's Cameo. As of 2026, four books in the series have been published.

The Englishman's Cameo (2009) introduces Muzaffar Jang, a twenty-five-year-old Mughal nobleman living in the Delhi of 1656 AD. Muzaffar ends up investigating a murder of which his friend, a jeweller's assistant, is accused. The book was published in French by Editions Philippe Picquier, as Le Camée Anglais.

Both editions received numerous favourable reviews, with Pradeep Sebastian of Business World writing: "Its intimate picture of life in Emperor Shahjahan's Dilli resembles a delicate Mughal miniature…" and Zac O'Yeah of Deccan Herald describing the book's "originality and freshness" as its strongest point. Gargi Gupta, for the Hindustan Times, wrote: "The Englishman's Cameo is a fast-paced yarn written in snappy prose. It also succeeds in evoking the Mughal era through its manners, fashions, jewels and architecture. There's blood, dead bodies every 50 pages or so, and even a love interest to keep readers hooked."

The Eighth Guest & Other Muzaffar Jang Mysteries (2011) is a collection of ten short mystery stories set in the latter half of 1656 AD, following Muzaffar Jang's successful solving of the case of The Englishman's Cameo. These stories are set against varying backdrops, including the Imperial Atelier, a traditional Mughal garden, the sarai built by the Princess Jahanara in Delhi, and the Royal Elephant Stables. Included in the collection was the first Muzaffar Jang short story (Murk of Art), reprinted in this collection as The Hand of an Artist.

Engraved in Stone (2012), the third book in the series, is set in Agra. When a wealthy and influential merchant named Mumtaz Hassan is murdered, the Diwan-e-Kul, Mir Jumla (who is in Agra, en route to the Deccan, where he's been sent on a campaign) assigns Muzaffar the task of finding the culprit. In the process, Muzaffar stumbles across another mystery which is as old as Muzaffar himself.

Crimson City (2015) is set in Delhi during early spring, 1657. The novel starts with recalling Mughal army's siege of Bidar in the Deccan, and introduces Muzaffar Jang as the brother-in-law of the Kotwal of Dilli. The novel weaves through historical landmarks of Mughal-era Dilli while showcasing the ability of Muzaffar Jang in solving a series of murders in his neighbourhood, as well as other unconnected crimes, including the abduction of a moneylender's infant son, and the death of a wealthy nobleman in the bath house he himself had built.

=== Other writings ===
Liddle has written a range of short stories in different genres. Several of these have won awards (including the Commonwealth Broadcasting Association Awards Short Story Competition, for A Morning Swim, in 2003) or have been selected for anthologies. In 2016, one of her stories, Poppies in the Snow, was longlisted for The Sunday Times EFG Short Story Award. Her first collection of contemporary short stories was published as My Lawfully Wedded Husband and Other Stories in 2012.

Liddle's non-fiction writing includes travel writing, humour, and writing on classic cinema.

== Awards and recognition ==
- Commonwealth Broadcasting Association Short Story Competition – Honourable Mention (2002) for Love and the Papaya Man
- Commonwealth Broadcasting Association Short Story Competition – Overall Winner (2003) for A Morning Swim
- Winner of the Oxfordbookstore e-Author version 4.0 for a set of five short stories: Woman to Woman, The Mango Tree, The Tale of a Summer Vacation, The Marble Princess, and The Sari Satyagraha.
- Longlisted for The Sunday Times EFG Short Story Award (2016) for Poppies in the Snow
