= Countess Morphy =

British food writer, dance critic, and cookery demonstrato

Marcelle Azra Hincks (25 October 1883 – 1938), known by the pen name Countess Morphy, was a British food writer, dance critic, and cookery demonstrator, famed for her book on world gastronomy.

== Biography ==
Marcelle Azra Hincks was born in New Orleans, Louisiana in 1883, to Edgar Hincks and Louise Pemberton Hincks. She moved to England as a young girl, residing in Kensington in 1891 with her mother and elder half-siblings Lili and John Pemberton. The head of the household was Alfred du Cros, managing director of a mining corporation who was born in Ireland. The four servants living in the house indicate a comfortable middle-class existence. Her father died in Louisiana in 1901, after which her mother remarried to Alfred du Cros. On occasion, Marcelle used this surname.

She became a naturalised British subject in 1916 and in 1934 was married in Fulham to Ellert Webster Forbes. She died at a comparatively early age only four years later in 1938 at "Sorrento", Lyme Regis, the "beloved wife of Major Ellert Forbes".

She is buried in the Church of St Candida and Holy Cross in Whitchurch Canonicorum, for, in 1939, Ellert Forbes, in a letter to The Times appealing for funds for the restoration of that church, mentions that his wife is buried there not far from the tomb of Saint Candida. He thinks this might be of note to those interested in “international gastronomy”, and that “It was not her only aim to teach the appreciation of good food, but she hoped that by telling us how other nations fared, we might learn to understand each other better and to live more peaceably.”

There is a story behind her adoption of the name Countess Morphy. In the eighteenth century, an Irish aristocrat, Michael Morphy, took his family to Spain. A son, Don Diego Morphy, settled in Louisiana. He was in San Domingo when the French Revolution began and fled aboard an English ship to Charleston, South Carolina. By a second marriage he had a daughter, Emma, who married David Hincks. Marcelle was a descendant of this union, giving her some connection with the surname Morphy.

== Writing career ==
Countess Morphy is nowadays mainly connected with cookery and food writing but she began her career in print as a dance critic. She wrote on ancient Greek dance for the Nineteenth Century and the Revue archéologique, and began contributing to The New Age in 1910. In that year she produced her first book, a slim volume entitled The Japanese Dance. As a critic, she also wrote about the great modern dancers of her day, such as Pavlova and Isadora Duncan. Her early cookery books were, to judge by the titles, and the speed of publication, fairly lightweight: Lightning Cookery (1931), The Kiddies Cookery Cards (1932), 100 ways of Cooking Eggs (1932), The Memorandum Cookbook (1932) and Picnic Snacks, (1933). All published by Michael Joseph in conjunction with Selfridges, they were probably associated with her employment by the department store as a cookery demonstrator. Elizabeth David recalled attending her cookery classes at Selfridges as a young girl and being impressed with her expertise.

The book on which her writing reputation rests, Recipes of All Nations, was published by Selfridges in 1935. A massive book of 800 pages, each of 18 chapters covers a country. There are two other chapters; on ‘The Creole Cookery of New Orleans’ (with an introduction outlining the history of this her homeland) and a final one on ‘Cookery of Many Lands’. Despite her husband’s opinion that she wrote to promote peace, she is pessimistic about the role of cookery in international affairs in her preface:

Racial and climatic factors are responsible for the wide divergencies in national cookery and food, and the study of comparative cookery shows the unbridgeable gulf which exists between peoples. North, South, East, West - learn what they eat, and you will realize why they have always clashed. In Europe itself, the abyss between the palates of one nation and another explains the enmity and hostility which exist between human whose conception of feeding is completely antithetic.’

Morphy goes on to say her motive in writing the book ‘is to help the modern housewife who takes an intelligent interest in cooking to have excellent, varied and inexpensive food in her own home.’ She does not flatter her readers, asserting that ‘English food is apt to be monotonous, and the average woman is frightened of foreign cookery.’ She concludes by hoping to dispel the myths about foreign cookery and introduce English housewives to the ordinary cooking of foreign lands.

As well as her own expertise, she called on that of various chefs who cooked in ‘ethnic’ restaurants to be found in London in her day: Mr S.K. Cheng of the Shanghai Emporium and Restaurant in Greek Street advised on Chinese food and Madam N. Wolkoff, proprietor of the Russian Tea Room in London helped with the Russian chapter. (So, if housewives did not cook foreign food, middle-class ones in London could experience it in restaurants.)

Although some critics picked on the inevitable mistakes which occurred in this giant and wide-ranging book, and some ridiculed the recipe for fricassée of iguana from Guinea, on the whole the work was greeted with enthusiasm and was in print for a long period. A review in the Times noted that she wrote for those needing to cook a good meal for a hungry family and thus cited bourgeois and peasant recipes, which were also economical. The reviewer questioned the absence of chapters on British cookery- did she hold it in too low esteem?

Nowadays, books on foreign cuisines, many of them associated with television series, are common. Recipes of All Nations is the ancestor of these and is considered useful in the kitchen by many, today.

== Works ==
=== As Marcelle Azra Hincks ===
- The Japanese Dance, 1910

=== As Countess Morphy ===
- The memorandum cookery book, 1932
- 100 ways of cooking eggs, 1932
- The Kiddies Cookery Cards, 1932
- Picnic Snacks, 1933
- Recipes of all Nations, 1935
- The Kitchen Library vols 1 to 6, 1935-6
- The Polyglot Cookery Series vols 1-3., 1935-6
- Mushroom Recipes, 1936
- English recipes, including the traditional dishes of Scotland, Ireland & Wales, 1936
- Good Food from Italy: A Receipt Book, 1937
- The Kitchen Library, 1937

=== Posthumous ===
- The Kitchen Encyclopaedia, 1946
- 1948 British Receipts, 1946
