= Indian Institute of Tourism and Travel Management =

Higher education and research institute in India

- Motto in English: Tourism Education Protecting culture
- Type: Travel and Tourism Management School
- Established: 1983; 43 years ago
- Parent institution: Ministry of Tourism, Government of India
- Director: Dr. Alok Sharma: AICTE; NCHMCT
- Location: Gwalior (HQ); Bhubaneswar; Noida; Nellore; Goa; Bodh Gaya; Shillong; Kasaragod
- Campus: Urban
- Nickname: IITTM
- Website: www.iittm.ac.in

Indian Institute of Tourism and Travel Management (IITTM) is an institute based in Gwalior, Madhya Pradesh, India, with campuses in Bhubaneswar, Noida, Nellore, and Goa, offering training, education and research in sustainable management of tourism, travel and other allied sectors. It is an autonomous organization under the Ministry of Tourism, Government of India. It was established in 1983.

== Campus ==
Indian Institute of Tourism and Travel Management
#	Institute	City	State	Founded	Type	Website
1	IITTM, Gwalior	Gwalior	Madhya Pradesh	1992	Headquarter	
2	IITTM, Bhubaneswar	Bhubaneswar	Odisha	1996	Campus	iittmb.in/
3	National Institute of Water Sports	Panaji	Goa	1990	Center	niws.nic.in
4	IITTM, Noida	Noida	Uttar Pradesh	2007	Campus	iittmnoida.ac.in/
5	IITTM, Nellore	Nellore	Andhra Pradesh	2008	Campus	iittmsouth.org
6	IITTM, Bodh Gaya	Bodh Gaya	Bihar	2018	Campus	
7	IITTM, Shillong	Shillong	Meghalaya	2018	Campus	
8	IITTM, Kasaragod	Kasaragod	Kerala	2026 Proposal	Campus Proposal	

== Academics ==
Academic programmes offered by IITTM are based on the standard model of management education practised globally. IITTM offers specially tailored tourism business management programmes besides offering a variety of training programmes for different stake holders. Programmes offered by IITTM are: Gwalior Center-

- PhD in Tourism
- Masters in Business Administration (Tourism and Travel)
- Bachelors In Business Administration (Tourism and Travel)

Bhubaneswar Center-

- Masters in Business Administration (Tourism and Travel)
- Bachelors in Business Administration (Tourism and Travel)

Noida Center-

- Masters in Business Administration (Tourism and Travel)
- Bachelors in Business Administration (Tourism and Travel)

Nellore Center-

- Masters in Business Administration (Tourism and Travel)
- Bachelors in Business Administration(Tourism and Travel)

== See also ==
- Institute of Hotel Management
- Confederation of Tourism and Hospitality
- List of autonomous higher education institutes in India
