= Institute of Hotel Management, Guwahati =

- Institute of Hotel Management Catering Technology & Applied Nutrition, Guwahati
- Motto: Where Dreams of Hospitality Take Flight
- Type: Hospitality Management School
- Established: 1984 (42 years ago)
- Affiliations: National Council for Hotel Management and Catering Technology
- Principal: Dr. Amitabh Dey
- Location: 26.161712°N 91.770546°E
- Campus: near Senco Jewellers, Bhangagarh, Opposite Rajib Bhawan, Guwahati – 781005, Guwahati Assam
- Website: www.ihmctanghy.org.in

The Institute of Hotel Management, Catering Technology and Applied Nutrition, Guwahati is an educational institution for training students in hotel management, catering technology, food service, and allied subjects, located in Guwahati, the capital of Assam, India. The institute was established by the Ministry of Tourism, Government of India, in 1984 as a Food Craft Institute. It was later upgraded to an Institute of Hotel Management in 1995 and is affiliated with the National Council for Hotel Management and Catering Technology.

The institute is located in the heart of the city at AIDC Campus, Bhangagarh, near Senco Jewellers and opposite Rajiv Bhawan in Guwahati, Assam – 781005.

== History ==
The institute was established in 1984 as a Food Craft Institute' by the Ministry of Tourism, Government of India, with the objective of providing skilled manpower to the hospitality and tourism industry. In 1995, the institute was upgraded to an Institute of Hotel Management, expanding its academic programmes and training facilities.

In 2006, the institute moved to its permanent campus at Barbari, Guwahati. In 2025–26, the institute relocated back to its earlier premises at AIDC Campus, Bhangagarh, following government directives related to the Silsako wetland area. The institute currently continues its academic and training activities from the AIDC Campus in Guwahati.

== Academic programmes ==
The institute offers undergraduate, postgraduate, diploma, and certificate programmes in the field of hospitality education and training. The courses offered include B.Sc. in Hospitality and Hotel Administration, M.Sc. in Hospitality Administration, Craftsmanship Certificate Course in Food Production and Patisserie, Post Graduate Diploma in Accommodation Operations and Management, and Diploma courses in Bakery, Front Office, Housekeeping, Food and Beverage Service, and Bartending.

The B.Sc. in Hospitality and Hotel Administration and M.Sc. in Hospitality Administration programmes are conducted in affiliation with the National Council for Hotel Management and Catering Technology, with the degree awarded by Jawaharlal Nehru University, New Delhi.

== Campus ==
The institute currently operates from its premises at AIDC Campus, Bhangagarh in Guwahati, Assam. The campus includes academic classrooms and practical training facilities designed for hospitality education. These include training kitchens, bakery and confectionery laboratories, a training restaurant, front office laboratory, housekeeping laboratory, computer laboratory, library, and a multipurpose hall (MP Hall), along with other instructional spaces used for practical learning and skill development in hospitality and hotel management.

== Training and placements ==
The institute facilitates campus recruitment and industry training opportunities for its students through collaborations with organizations from the hospitality and service sectors. In recent years, the institute has reported 100% placement for eligible students over the last four consecutive years.

Graduates of the institute find employment in sectors such as the hotel industry, airlines, cruise lines, quick service restaurants, retail management, and facility management. The programmes also provide a foundation for entrepreneurship and opportunities for higher education in hospitality and related fields.

Industry training forms an integral part of the academic curriculum of the institute. Students undergo industrial training in hotels and hospitality establishments to gain practical exposure to operations and service standards within the hospitality industry. This training enables students to apply classroom learning in real-world environments and develop professional skills required for careers in hospitality and related service sectors.

== Affiliation ==
The institute is affiliated with the National Council for Hotel Management and Catering Technology (NCHMCT), an autonomous body under the Ministry of Tourism, Government of India, which coordinates hospitality education and training across India.
