= Institute of Hotel Management, Hajipur =

Hospitality school in Hajipur

- Institute of Hotel Management, Catering Technology and Applied Nutrition, Hajipur
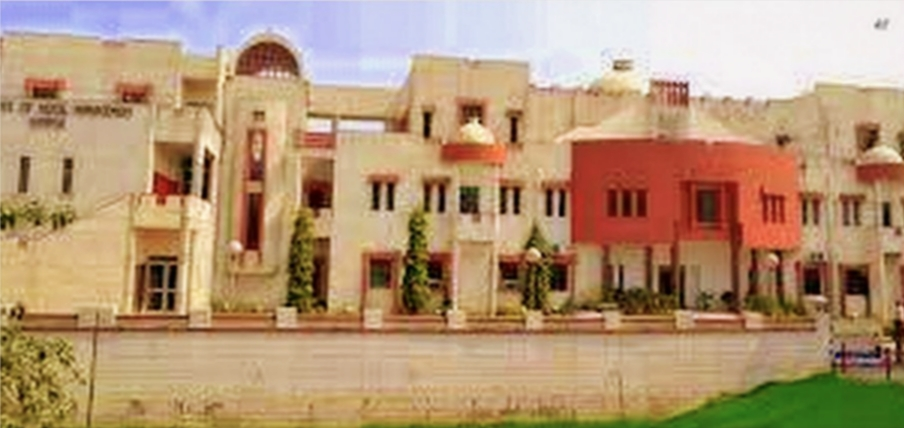
- Other name: IHM Hajipur
- Type: Hospitality management school
- Established: 1998
- Affiliations: National Council for Hotel Management and Catering Technology
- Principal: Pulak Mandal
- Location: Hajipur, Bihar, India
- Campus: Urban
- Website: ihmhajipur.net

Institute of Hotel Management, Catering Technology and Applied Nutrition, Hajipur (IHMCT&AN), generally known as IHM Hajipur, is a hospitality management school located in Hajipur, Bihar. It is run under the aegis of Ministry of Tourism, Government of India and Department of Tourism, Govt. of Bihar.

== History ==
An initiative of the Ministry of Tourism, Govt. of India; Institute of Hotel Management, Hajipur has been in operation since 1998. It caters to not only the students of India but also international students from the SAARC countries.

It is one of 21 central Institutes directly under the control of Ministry of Tourism, Govt. of India, and affiliated to National Council for Hotel Management & Catering Technology (NCHM&CT), Noida. The Institute awards 3-year bachelor's degrees in Hospitality & Hotel Administration, through Indira Gandhi National Open University (IGNOU), New Delhi.

== Vegetarian option ==
In 2016, a few of the IHMCTANs (Ahmedabad, Bhopal, Jaipur) started giving a hotel management student the option to choose only vegetarian cooking. This decision to offer a vegetarian option by IHMCTANs could possibly be the first amongst any of the hospitality training institutes of the world. It is expected that all IHMCTANs, including IHMCTAN Hajipur, will start offering a vegetarian cooking option from academic year 2018 onwards.

== Notable alumni ==
- Pankaj Tripathi (Actor) - After getting a diploma from the institute, Mr Tripathi worked at a Five Star hotel in Patna. Later, he went to National School of Drama, New Delhi.

== See also ==
- List of institutions of higher education in Bihar
