= Vivek Singh (chef) =

Indian celebrity chef (born 1971)

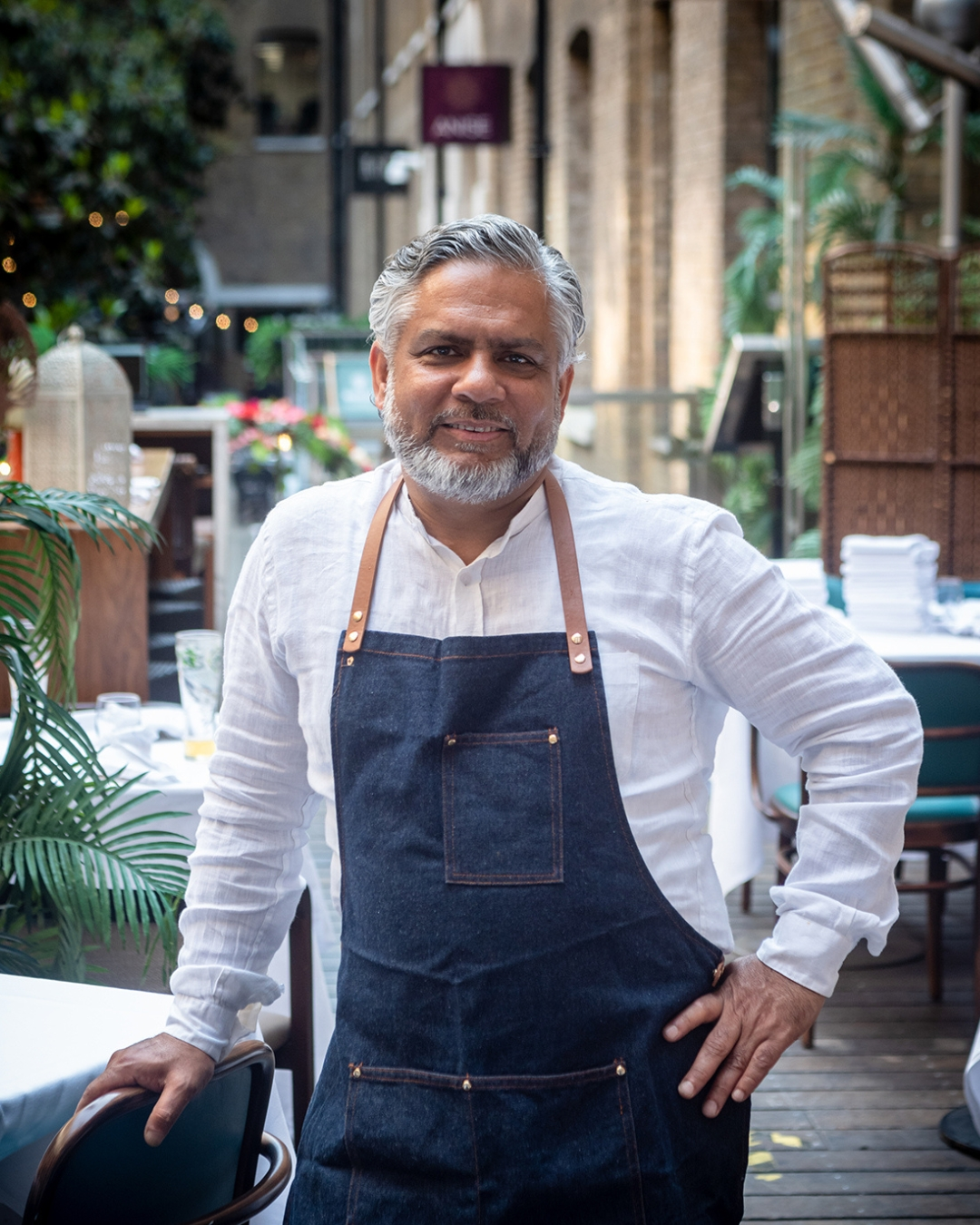
- Vivek Singh in The Cinnamon Club
- Born: 6 May 1971 (age 55); Asansol, in West Bengal, India
- Education: Institute of Hotel Management, New Delhi
- Spouse: Archana Singh
- Children: Eshaan Singh, Maya Singh
- Culinary career
- Cooking style: Indian cuisine
- Current restaurants
- The Cinnamon Club, London, UK; Cinnamon Kitchen, London City, Battersea and Leeds; Cinnamon Bazaar, Covent Garden and Richmond, London, UK
- Television shows
- Madhur Jaffrey's Curry Nation (2013); At Home With Rachel Allen; My Kitchen Rules UK (2017)
- Website: viveksingh.co.uk

Vivek Singh (born 6 May 1971) is an Indian celebrity chef and restaurateur. He is the CEO and Executive Chef of five London-based restaurants specializing in modern Indian cuisine. Singh makes regular appearances on BBC's Saturday Kitchen, and has been featured on Madhur Jaffrey's Curry Nation, At Home with Rachel Allen, My Kitchen Rules UK and various NDTV Good Times programs.

== Early life and education ==
Vivek Singh was born and raised in a coal-mining community in Asansol, West Bengal, India, where his father worked as a mining engineer. He attended St. Patrick’s Higher Secondary School in Asansol. Western influence in the community of Asansol led to Singh being exposed to different cuisines from a young age, which impacted his personal cooking style.

Singh studied at the Institute of Hotel Management, IHM Pusa in New Delhi from 1990 to 1993. In 1993, he was selected for the Oberoi Centre for Learning and Development, training at the Maidens Hotel and Oberoi flight services.

== Career ==
After completing his training in 1995, Singh was appointed to the Oberoi Flight Services in Mumbai. He later worked at the Oberoi Grand in Kolkata and oversaw operations at Gharana, a restaurant specializing in royal Indian cuisine.

In 1998, Singh was appointed Executive Chef at Rajvilas in Jaipur, where he met restaurateur Iqbal Wahhab. A discussion between them about applying French cooking techniques to Indian cuisine led to the establishment of Singh’s first restaurant in London.

Singh co-founded The Cinnamon Club in London in 2001, his first restaurant in the UK. Since then, he has opened several restaurants under the Cinnamon brand.

In 2015, he received an Honorary Doctorate from the University of Warwick for his contributions to Indian cuisine in the UK.

== Restaurants ==
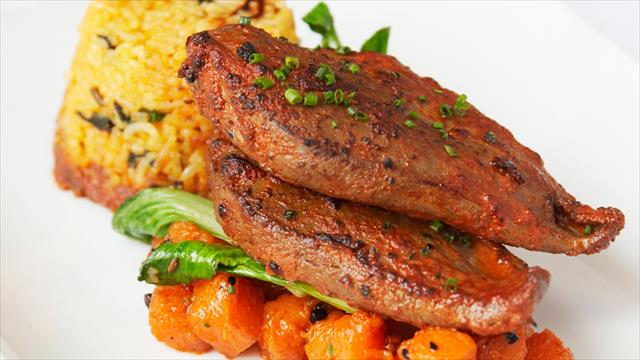
Modern Indian dish prepared at London-based Indian restaurant- The Cinnamon Club

=== The Cinnamon Club ===
In 2001, Singh opened his first Indian restaurant, The Cinnamon Club, in London. The Cinnamon Club is recognized as one of the 'Best Indian Restaurants' by SquareMeal’s food guide in London, UK.

=== Cinnamon Kitchen & Anise ===
Cinnamon Kitchen & Anise opened in 2008.

=== Cinnamon Kitchen Battersea ===
In 2018, Singh opened Cinnamon Kitchen Battersea, located in the Battersea Power Station development.

=== Cinnamon Kitchen Leeds ===
In 2025, Singh expanded his Cinnamon Kitchen brand to Leeds, located in The Queens Hotel. The restaurant draws inspiration from the Himsagar Express railway journey through 12 Indian states.

=== Cinnamon Soho ===
In 2012, Singh opened his third restaurant, Cinnamon Soho, and published his fourth cookbook, Cinnamon Kitchen: The Cookbook.

=== Cinnamon Bazaar ===
The restaurant opened in Covent Garden in 2016. In 2017, it was listed in the Bib Gourmand, which noted it "[offering] both high-quality food and good value for money [...]"

=== Cinnamon Bazaar Richmond ===
The restaurant expanded to Cinnamon Bazaar Richmond in winter 2024.

=== Cinnamon Kitchen Oxford (closed permanently in 2021) ===
Cinnamon Kitchen Oxford, the fifth restaurant in the Cinnamon Collection, opened in 2017 and was Singh’s first UK restaurant outside London. It closed permanently in 2021.

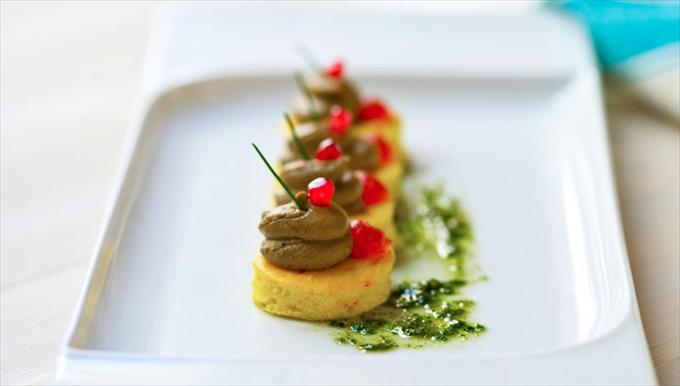
Created by Indian Chef Vivek Singh at Cinnamon Soho, the third official restaurant under Cinnamon venture.

== Public appearances ==
In 2006, Singh was invited to Hangar 7 in Salzburg, Austria where he collaborated with Chefs Eckart Witzigmann and Roland Trettl.

In 2007, Singh collaborated to create an Indian-inspired sausage inspired by Daljit Singh’s childhood memories.

In 2011, Singh was invited to Gourmet Abu Dhabi to showcase modern Indian cuisine. He was also a guest speaker on Maharaja Express "A passage through India" with Allan Jenkins.

The following year, Singh was invited to New York City for a week-long pop-up event at Desmond's NYC.

== Charity work ==
In 2008, Singh became an ambassador for Wooden Spoon, a rugby charity supporting underprivileged children. Singh collaborated with former rugby union players Jason Leonard, Martin Offiah, Lee Mears and Nick Easter to raise funds through an event called Scrum Dine With Me.

Singh has supported Action Against Hunger since 2002, hosting an annual Diwali Charity Event to raise funds. He also supports Find Your Feet and participates in yearly campaigns to raise awareness through the Curry for Change campaign. Singh works with The Prince's Trust charity, Mosaic Network, which aims to inspire young people from deprived communities to realize their talents and potential. Other supported initiatives include the Asian Restaurant Skills Board, which promotes college courses, work experience placements, and apprenticeships related to the Indian restaurant sector.

== Controversy ==
In 2008, Singh created a dish for Virgin Media, which the company claimed was the world's hottest, to promote a new Bollywood movie channel. The claim generated debate as other curry house owners disputed it. Singh commented that while the dish was listed in the Guinness Book of World Records, measuring the "hottest" curry was subjective. The dish was named The Bollywood Burner.

== Personal life ==
In May 1997, Singh married Archana in Bilaspur, India. They have two children; Eshaan (born October 2001) and Maya (born July 2006). Singh resides with his wife and two children in South London.

== Cookbooks ==
- The Cinnamon Club Cookbook. Absolute Press. 2003. ISBN 9781904573012.
- The Cinnamon Club Seafood Cookbook. London UK: Absolute Press. 2007. ISBN 978-1904573418.
- Curry, Classic & Contemporary 3rd book by Vivek Singh. London: Absolute Press. 2008. ISBN 978-1904573883.
- Walker, Chrissie (2012). Contribution in Capital Spice. London: Absolute Press. ISBN 978-1906650728.
- Cinnamon Kitchen The Cookbook by Vivek singh. London: Absolute Press. 2012. ISBN 978-1906650803.
- Singh; Yaseen, Vivek; Nagaraj, Abdul; Hari (2011). Cinnamon Club: Indian Cuisine Re-invented by Vivek Singh, Abdul Yaseen & Hari Nagaraj. India. ISBN 978-8184001143.
- Singh, Vivek (27 January 2015). Spice at Home. London, UK: Bloomsbury. ISBN 9781472910905.
- Singh, Vivek (2017). Indian Festival Feasts. London, UK: Bloomsbury. ISBN 9781472938473.
