= IHM Jaipur =

Coordinates: 26.9346083°N 75.7826849°E

Institute of Hotel Management, Jaipur
- Institute of Hotel Management Catering & Nutrition, Jaipur
- Type: Hospitality management school
- Affiliations: National Council for Hotel Management and Catering Technology
- Location: Jaipur, India
- Campus: Urban
- Website: ihmjaipur.com

Institute of Hotel Management is a college in Jaipur offering training in the hospitality industry. The institute is governed by the National Council for Hotel Management and Catering Technology set up by the Indian Ministry of Tourism.

== Affiliation ==
The institute is affiliated to National Council for Hotel Management & Catering Technology, Noida under the Ministry of Tourism of the Government of India to conduct the various courses under their umbrella. NCHMCT has signed a Memorandum of understanding (MOU) with Indira Gandhi National Open University, New Delhi and the B.Sc. in Hotel & Hospitality Administration Degree is awarded by IGNOU and the course is conducted by NCHMCT, Noida at all the 51 institutes under it.

== Vegetarian Option ==
In 2016, IHMCTAN Jaipur (along with IHMCTAN Ahmedabad and IHMCTAN Bhopal) started giving a student the option to choose only vegetarian cooking. This decision to offer a vegetarian option by IHMCTAN Jaipur may be the first amongst any of the hospitality training institutes of the world. In 2018, the National Council for Hotel Management (NCHM) announced that a vegetarian option would be provided at all IHMCTANs.
