= Institute of Hotel Management, Lucknow =

Indian hotel management school

Coordinates: 26.893°N 80.950°E

- Institute of Hotel Management Catering Technology and Applied Nutrition, Lucknow
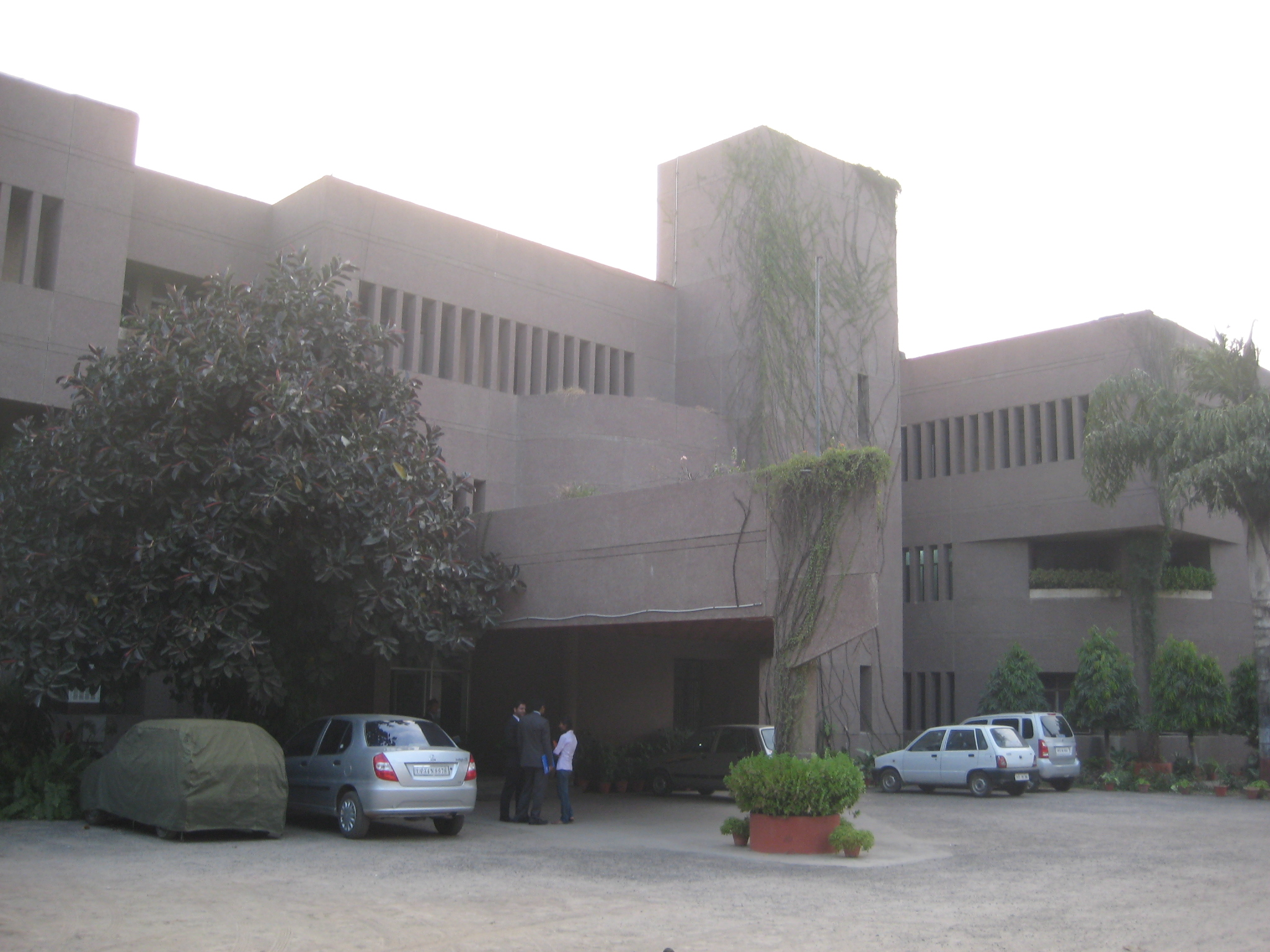
- Other name: IHM Lucknow
- Type: Hospitality management school
- Established: 1969; 57 years ago
- Affiliations: National Council for Hotel Management and Catering Technology
- Location: Lucknow, Uttar Pradesh, India
- Website: www.ihmlucknow.com

Institute of Hotel Management Catering Technology & Applied Nutrition, Lucknow is a hospitality management school located is located in Lucknow, Uttar Pradesh, India. It was established in 1969, it is affiliated to National Council for Hotel Management and Catering Technology

== History ==
IHM Lucknow was established in year 1969 as a Food Craft Institute and upgraded to an Institute of Hotel Management in year 1980. The first batch of three-year diploma in hotel management students passed out from the institute in 1983 when the institute was located on Ashok Marg road in the heart of Lucknow. Until 1989, the institute remained small with around 20 diploma students each year. In the beginning of the academic year 1989, the institute moved to its present premises in Sector-G, Aliganj and batch size was increased to about 70 and more in later years. From 2009 to 2012 batch college started semester system in place of year system as per study calendar changed by NCHM&CT.

== Courses ==
IHM Lucknow offers following courses-

- Bachelor of Science (B.Sc) in Hospitality and Hotel Administration
- Master of Science (M.Sc) in Hospitality and Hotel Administration
- Diploma (Diploma) in Food Production (Diploma Course)
- Diploma (Diploma) in Food & Beverage Service (Diploma Course)
- Diploma (Diploma) in Bakery & Confectionery (Diploma Course)
- Diploma (Diploma) in Front Office (Diploma Course)
- Craftsmanship (Certificate) Course in Professional Bartending (Craft Certificate Course)

=== Institute Affiliated ===
This institute is affiliated with J.N.U. (Jawaharlal Nehru University Lucknow) and all the courses which this institute offer gets final degree from JNU. Few years Back this institute have an Affiliate Partnership with IGNOU(Indra Gandhi National Open University).

== Infrastructure ==
The university has separate hostel and gym for boys and girls. The institute has Bakery and Confectionery Lab, Computer Lab, Audio-Visual Lab.

== Option for Vegetarians ==
In 2016, a few of the IHMCTANs (Ahmedabad, Bhopal, Jaipur) started giving students the option to choose only vegetarian cooking. This decision to offer a vegetarian option by IHMCTANs may be the first amongst any of the hospitality training institutes of the world. It is expected that all IHMCTANs, including IHMCTAN Lucknow, will start offering a vegetarian cooking option from academic year 2018 onwards.
