= Manjit Gill =

Indian chef of Punjabi origin

Manjit Gill is an Indian chef of Punjabi origin. He is currently serving as the President of the Indian Federation of Culinary Associations. He is also one of the corporate chefs for ITC Hotels. He was awarded the Escoffier Medal.

== Biography ==
His family migrated to India from present-day Pakistan after the Partition of Punjab. He grew up in Delhi and studied B.Sc. from Delhi University. He went on study Hotel Management from IHM Pusa.

His daughters, Reetika Gill and Preetika Gill Malik, are also chefs.
