= Rakesh Sethi (chef) =

Indian celebrity chef

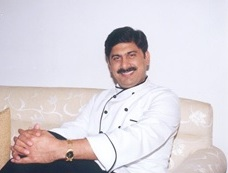
Rakesh Sethi

Rakesh Sethi is celebrity chef and television personality based in India. Sethi is currently corporate executive chef of Radisson Hotel Group. He is popularly known for his cooking show namely Mirch Masala on StarPlus.

== Career ==
Sethi passed out from Institute of Hotel Management, Pusa in 1982 and began his culinary career as a Hotel corp of India unit chef. In the 2000s, he hosted a show named Mirch Masala on the StarPlus which had a running length of over 160 episodes. He also worked as an Executive Chef at Ramada Plaza, New Delhi; Inter-Continental The Grand, New Delhi and East India Hotels, New Delhi.

Sethi was part of team which created Guinness world record by preparing 918 kilogram of Khichdi at World food India exhibition of 2017. As of 2019, he is corporate executive chef of Radisson Hotel Group.

== Works ==
- Rakesh Sethi's Mirch Masala, Popular Prakashan. ISBN 9788179910856.
