= Ministry of Tourism (India) =

Government ministry of India

- Branch of Government of India

- Ministry of Tourism

Agency overview
- Formed: 1967
- Jurisdiction: Government of India
- Headquarters: Ministry of Tourism Transport Bhawan Sansad Marg New Delhi,110011 New Delhi
- Annual budget: ₹2,438.40 crore (US$250 million) (2026–27 est.)
- Ministers responsible: Gajendra Singh Shekhawat, Cabinet Minister; Suresh Gopi, Minister of State
- Website: tourism.gov.in

The Ministry of Tourism, a branch of the Government of India, is the apex body for the formulation and administration of the rules, regulations and laws relating to the development and promotion of tourism in India. It facilitates the Indian department of tourism. The head of the ministry is the Minister of Tourism, held by Gajendra Singh Shekhawat.

== History ==
The potential for tourism in India was first recognized with the setting up of a Tourist Traffic Committee, an ad-hoc body, in 1948, to suggest ways and means to promote tourism in India. Based on its recommendations, a tourist traffic branch was set up the following year, with regional offices in Delhi and Mumbai, and in 1951, in Kolkata and Chennai. A separate department of tourism under the government was first created on 1 March 1958, that was put under the ambit of the Ministry of Transport and Communications. It was headed by a Director General in the rank of joint secretary. Simultaneously, Tourism Development Council, an advisory body, was constituted and was chaired by the minister in charge of tourism.

After a fall in the number of tourists entering India in 1961 from the preceding year, the government constituted a committee headed by Lakshmi Kant Jha, then secretary in the Department of Economic Affairs, under the Ministry of Finance, to find and examine the reasons. The committee attributed it to the Chinese aggression in the backdrop of the Sino-Indian War that year. Subsequently, as per the committee's recommendations, visa norms were liberalized, and the India Tourism Development Corporation was established in 1966 as a functional agency of the Department of Tourism. Further, Prime Minister Indira Gandhi convened a conference in October that year, the deliberations of which resulted in the creation of the Ministry of Tourism and Civil Aviation. Karan Singh was appointed the first minister.

Despite his skills as an orator and scholarly knowledge in the Sanskrit language, Singh failed to take tourism on a growing path during the initial years, owing mostly to failure in getting funds for the promotion and infrastructure of tourism. He subsequently persuaded Air India to get their officers involved in promotion of tourism to India. Region-wise targets for arrivals were given and Air India chiefs were given powers to oversee the working of overseas tourist offices of India; 'Operation Europe' for the said region was later extended to other areas. Air India's failure to take this forward owing to losses in revenue "collision" of "egos of tourist officers" led to slump in the growth of tourism. Prime minister Rajiv Gandhi later took charge of the ministry before quitting in favour of other ministers who, Pran Nath Seth in Successful Tourism wrote, "felt that the tourism portfolio was a demotion", as Civil Aviation was separated from the ministry. During this time, the Tourism was tied with Commerce Ministry, and later under V. P. Singh's ministry, in 1991 with Agriculture, when it was headed by Chaudhary Devi Lal. It was again tied with Civil Aviation that year, headed by Madhavrao Scindia, before the Deve Gowda government in 1996 attached it with the Ministry of Parliamentary Affairs. Tourism was then combined with culture portfolio when it was headed by Jagmohan. The latter was separated in 2002 and an independent ministry for tourism has been active since.

== Organisation ==
=== Divisions ===
- Administration & Information Technology Division
- Destination Development Division
- Facilitation & Standards Division
- Integrated Finance Division
- Marketing, Promotion & International Cooperation Division
- Monitoring and Coordination Division
- Research & Analytics Division
- Skilling & Capacity Building Division
- Strategy & Product Development Division

Statutory Professional Bodies

- National Council For Hotel Management and Catering Technology
- Institutes of Hotel Management, Catering Technology and Applied Nutrition
- Indian Institute of Tourism and Travel Management

Autonomous Bodies

- National Institute of Water Sports

Central Public Sector Undertakings

- India Tourism Development Corporation
- Hotel Corporation of India

Institutes

- Indian Culinary Institute

== Campaigns ==
=== National Tourism Day ===
The Ministry of Tourism, along with each state's own tourism department, celebrate the nation's national tourism day on January 25 annually, as it aligns with the philosophy of Atithi Devo Bhava ('a guest is akin to a god') and that travel within the country can be transformative.

=== Incredible India ===
The Ministry of Tourism's joint secretary Amitabh Kant collaborated with Ogilvy & Mather to create the Incredible India marketing initiative, aiming to promote India's image as a high-end tourist destination.

Incredible India 2.0 was launched on September 27, 2017 by President Ram Nath Kovind, on the occasion of World Tourism Day.

=== Cleanliness Index ===
Union Tourism Ministry is planning to introduce "Cleanliness Index" for all cities in India. This index will declare the best performers which will motivate other cities to work on this aspect of their appeal. The methodology has been already formulated and will be implemented in 6 cities on a pilot basis.

=== Tourism campaign at ITB Berlin ===
In 2011, Indian tourism department had launched a major tourism campaign at the ITB Berlin (the world's largest travel trade show) under the guidance of Mr Sanjay Kothari and Mr Anand Kumar and Mr M.N. Javed.

== Cabinet Ministers ==
Portrait	Minister (Birth-Death) Constituency	Term of office			Political party	Ministry	Prime Minister
Portrait	Minister (Birth-Death) Constituency	From	To	Period	Political party	Ministry	Prime Minister
Minister of Tourism and Civil Aviation
	Karan Singh (born 1931); MP for Udhampur	16 March 1967	18 March 1971	4 years, 2 days	Indian National Congress	Indira II	Indira Gandhi
	Karan Singh (born 1931); MP for Udhampur	18 March 1971	9 November 1973	4 years, 2 days	Indian National Congress (Requisitionists)	Indira III	Indira Gandhi
	Raj Bahadur (1912–1990); MP for Bharatpur	9 November 1973	22 December 1976	3 years, 43 days	Indian National Congress (Requisitionists)	Indira III	Indira Gandhi
	Kotha Raghuramaiah (1912–1979); MP for Guntur	23 December 1976	24 March 1977	91 days	Indian National Congress (Requisitionists)	Indira III	Indira Gandhi
	Purushottam Kaushik (1930–2017); MP for Raipur	26 March 1977	15 July 1979	2 years, 111 days	Janata Party	Desai	Morarji Desai
	Morarji Desai (1896–1995); MP for Surat (Prime Minister)	15 July 1979	28 July 1979	13 days	Janata Party	Desai	Morarji Desai
	Mohammad Shafi Qureshi (1928–2016); MP for Anantnag	30 July 1979	14 January 1980	168 days	Janata Party (Secular)	Charan Singh	Charan Singh
	Janaki Ballabh Patnaik (1927–2015); MP for Cuttack	14 January 1980	7 June 1980	145 days	Indian National Congress (Indira)	Indira IV	Indira Gandhi
	Anant Sharma (1919–1988); Rajya Sabha MP for Bihar	8 June 1980	2 September 1982	2 years, 86 days	Indian National Congress (Indira)	Indira IV	Indira Gandhi
Minister of Tourism
	Khurshed Alam Khan (1919–2013); MP for Farrukhabad (MoS, I/C)	2 September 1982	14 February 1983	165 days	Indian National Congress (Indira)	Indira IV	Indira Gandhi
Minister of Tourism and Civil Aviation
	Khurshed Alam Khan (1919–2013); MP for Farrukhabad (MoS, I/C)	14 February 1983	31 October 1984	1 year, 316 days	Indian National Congress (Indira)	Indira IV	Indira Gandhi
	Khurshed Alam Khan (1919–2013); MP for Farrukhabad (MoS, I/C)	4 November 1984	31 December 1984	1 year, 316 days	Indian National Congress (Indira)	Rajiv I	Rajiv Gandhi
	Rajiv Gandhi (1944–1991); MP for Amethi (Prime Minister)	31 December 1984	25 September 1985	268 days	Indian National Congress (Indira)	Rajiv II	Rajiv Gandhi
Minister of Tourism
	H. K. L. Bhagat (1921–2005); MP for East Delhi	25 September 1985	12 May 1986	229 days	Indian National Congress (Indira)	Rajiv II	Rajiv Gandhi
	Mufti Mohammad Sayeed (1936–2016); Rajya Sabha MP for Jammu and Kashmir	12 May 1986	15 July 1987	1 year, 64 days	Indian National Congress (Indira)	Rajiv II	Rajiv Gandhi
	Rajiv Gandhi (1944–1991); MP for Amethi (Prime Minister)	15 July 1987	28 July 1987	13 days	Indian National Congress (Indira)	Rajiv II	Rajiv Gandhi
	Jagdish Tytler (born 1944); MP for Delhi Sadar (MoS, I/C)	28 July 1987	14 February 1988	201 days	Indian National Congress (Indira)	Rajiv II	Rajiv Gandhi
	Mohsina Kidwai (born 1932); MP for Meerut	14 February 1988	25 June 1988	132 days	Indian National Congress (Indira)	Rajiv II	Rajiv Gandhi
Minister of Civil Aviation and Tourism
	Shivraj Patil (born 1935); MP for Latur (MoS, I/C)	25 June 1988	2 December 1989	1 year, 160 days	Indian National Congress (Indira)	Rajiv II	Rajiv Gandhi
Minister of Tourism
	V. P. Singh (1931–2008); MP for Fatehpur (Prime Minister)	2 December 1989	5 December 1989	3 days	Janata Dal	Vishwanath	V. P. Singh
	Arun Nehru (1944–2013); MP for Bilhaur	6 December 1989	10 November 1990	339 days	Janata Dal	Vishwanath	V. P. Singh
	Chandra Shekhar (1927–2007); MP for Ballia (Prime Minister)	10 November 1990	21 November 1990	11 days	Samajwadi Janata Party (Rashtriya)	Chandra Shekhar	Chandra Shekhar
	Chaudhary Devi Lal (1915–2001); MP for Sikar (Deputy Prime Minister)	21 November 1990	21 June 1991	212 days	Samajwadi Janata Party (Rashtriya)	Chandra Shekhar	Chandra Shekhar
Minister of Civil Aviation and Tourism
	Madhavrao Scindia (1945–2001); MP for Gwalior	21 June 1991	9 January 1993	1 year, 202 days	Indian National Congress (Indira)	Rao	P. V. Narasimha Rao
	Ghulam Nabi Azad (born 1949); Rajya Sabha MP for Maharashtra	9 January 1993	16 May 1996	3 years, 128 days	Indian National Congress (Indira)	Rao	P. V. Narasimha Rao
	V. Dhananjay Kumar (1951–2019); MP for Mangalore	1 May 1996	16 May 1996	16 days	Bharatiya Janata Party	Vajpayee I	Atal Bihari Vajpayee
Minister of Tourism
	C. M. Ibrahim (born 1948); Rajya Sabha MP for Karnataka	1 June 1996	29 June 1996	28 days	Janata Dal	Deve Gowda	H. D. Deve Gowda
	Srikant Kumar Jena (born 1950); MP for Kendrapara	29 June 1996	21 April 1997	296 days	Janata Dal	Deve Gowda	H. D. Deve Gowda
	Srikant Kumar Jena (born 1950); MP for Kendrapara	21 April 1997	19 March 1998	296 days	Janata Dal	Gujral	Inder Kumar Gujral
	Madan Lal Khurana (1936–2018); MP for Delhi Sadar	19 March 1998	30 January 1999	317 days	Bharatiya Janata Party	Vajpayee II	Atal Bihari Vajpayee
	Ananth Kumar (1959–2018); MP for Bangalore South	30 January 1999	13 October 1999	256 days	Bharatiya Janata Party	Vajpayee II	Atal Bihari Vajpayee
	Uma Bharti (born 1959); MP for Bhopal (MoS, I/C)	13 October 1999	2 February 2000	112 days	Bharatiya Janata Party	Vajpayee III	Atal Bihari Vajpayee
	Ananth Kumar (1959–2018); MP for Bangalore South	2 February 2000	27 May 2000	115 days	Bharatiya Janata Party	Vajpayee III	Atal Bihari Vajpayee
Minister of Tourism and Culture
	Ananth Kumar (1959–2018); MP for Bangalore South	27 May 2000	1 September 2001	1 year, 97 days	Bharatiya Janata Party	Vajpayee III	Atal Bihari Vajpayee
Minister of Tourism
	Jagmohan (1927–2021); MP for New Delhi	1 September 2001	18 November 2001	78 days	Bharatiya Janata Party	Vajpayee III	Atal Bihari Vajpayee
Minister of Tourism and Culture
	Jagmohan (1927–2021); MP for New Delhi	18 November 2001	22 May 2004	2 years, 186 days	Bharatiya Janata Party	Vajpayee III	Atal Bihari Vajpayee
Minister of Tourism
	Renuka Chowdhury (born 1954); MP for Khammam (MoS, I/C)	23 May 2004	29 January 2006	1 year, 251 days	Indian National Congress	Manmohan I	Manmohan Singh
	Ambika Soni (born 1942); Rajya Sabha MP for Punjab	29 January 2006	22 May 2009	3 years, 113 days	Indian National Congress	Manmohan I	Manmohan Singh
	Selja Kumari (born 1962); MP for Ambala	28 May 2009	19 January 2011	1 year, 236 days	Indian National Congress	Manmohan II	Manmohan Singh
	Subodh Kant Sahay (born 1951); MP for Ranchi	19 January 2011	27 October 2012	1 year, 282 days	Indian National Congress	Manmohan II	Manmohan Singh
	K. Chiranjeevi (born 1955); Rajya Sabha MP for Andhra Pradesh (MoS, I/C)	28 October 2012	26 May 2014	1 year, 210 days	Indian National Congress	Manmohan II	Manmohan Singh
	Shripad Naik (born 1952); MP for North Goa (MoS, I/C)	27 May 2014	9 November 2014	166 days	Bharatiya Janata Party	Modi I	Narendra Modi
	Mahesh Sharma (born 1959); MP for Gautam Buddh Nagar (MoS, I/C)	9 November 2014	3 September 2017	2 years, 298 days	Bharatiya Janata Party	Modi I	Narendra Modi
	Alphons Kannanthanam (born 1953); Rajya Sabha MP for Rajasthan	3 September 2017	30 May 2019	1 year, 269 days	Bharatiya Janata Party	Modi I	Narendra Modi
	Prahlad Singh Patel (born 1960); MP for Damoh (MoS, I/C)	31 May 2019	7 July 2021	2 years, 37 days	Bharatiya Janata Party	Modi II	Narendra Modi
	G. Kishan Reddy (born 1964); MP for Secunderabad	7 July 2021	11 June 2024	2 years, 340 days	Bharatiya Janata Party	Modi II	Narendra Modi
	Gajendra Singh Shekhawat (born 1967); MP for Jodhpur	11 June 2024	Incumbent	2 years, 129 days	Bharatiya Janata Party	Modi III	Narendra Modi

== Ministers of State ==
Portrait	Minister (Birth-Death) Constituency	Term of office			Political party	Ministry	Prime Minister
Portrait	Minister (Birth-Death) Constituency	From	To	Period	Political party	Ministry	Prime Minister
Minister of State for Tourism and Civil Aviation
	Sarojini Mahishi (1927–2015); MP for Dharwad North	2 May 1971	9 November 1973	2 years, 191 days	Indian National Congress (Requisitionists)	Indira III	Indira Gandhi
	Surendra Pal Singh (1917–2009); MP for Bulandshahr	10 October 1974	23 December 1976	2 years, 74 days	Indian National Congress (Requisitionists)	Indira III	Indira Gandhi
Minister of State for Tourism and Civil Aviation
	P. Ankineedu Prasada Rao (1929–1997); MP for Bapatla	4 August 1979	14 January 1980	163 days	Indian National Congress (Urs)	Charan Singh	Charan Singh
	Kartik Oraon (1924–1981); MP for Lohardaga	14 January 1980	8 June 1980	146 days	Indian National Congress (Indira)	Indira IV	Indira Gandhi
	Chandulal Chandrakar (1920–1995); MP for Durg	8 June 1980	15 January 1982	1 year, 221 days	Indian National Congress (Indira)	Indira IV	Indira Gandhi
	Khurshed Alam Khan (1919–2013); MP for Farrukhabad	15 January 1982	2 September 1982	230 days	Indian National Congress (Indira)	Indira IV	Indira Gandhi
Minister of State for Tourism and Civil Aviation
	Ashok Gehlot (born 1951); MP for Jodhpur	31 December 1984	25 August 1985	237 days	Indian National Congress (Indira)	Rajiv II	Rajiv Gandhi
Minister of State for Tourism
	Ghulam Nabi Azad (born 1949); MP for Washim	25 September 1985	12 May 1986	229 days	Indian National Congress (Indira)	Rajiv II	Rajiv Gandhi
	Santosh Mohan Dev (1934–2017); MP for Silchar	12 May 1986	28 July 1987	1 year, 278 days	Indian National Congress (Indira)	Rajiv II	Rajiv Gandhi
	Giridhar Gamang (born 1943); MP for Koraput	14 February 1988	25 June 1988	132 days	Indian National Congress (Indira)	Rajiv II	Rajiv Gandhi
Minister of State for Tourism
	Usha Sinha (born 1946); MP for Vaishali	21 November 1990	10 April 1991	140 days	Samajwadi Janata Party (Rashtriya)	Chandra Shekhar	Chandra Shekhar
Minister of State for Civil Aviation and Tourism
	M. O. H. Farook (1937–2012); MP for Pondicherry (Civil Aviation, from 2 July 1992)	21 June 1991	17 January 1993	1 year, 210 days	Indian National Congress (Indira)	Rao	P. V. Narasimha Rao
	Sukhbans Kaur Bhinder (1943–2006); MP for Gurdaspur (Tourism)	2 July 1992	16 May 1996	3 years, 319 days	Indian National Congress (Indira)	Rao	P. V. Narasimha Rao
	G. Y. Krishnan (1929–2001); Rajya Sabha MP for Karnataka (Civil Aviation)	15 September 1995	16 May 1996	244 days	Indian National Congress (Indira)	Rao	P. V. Narasimha Rao
Minister of State for Tourism
	Omak Apang (born 1971); MP for Arunachal West	20 March 1998	13 October 1999	1 year, 207 days	Arunachal Congress	Vajpayee II	Atal Bihari Vajpayee
Minister of State for Tourism and Culture
	Vinod Khanna (1946–2017); MP for Gurdaspur	1 July 2002	29 January 2003	212 days	Bharatiya Janata Party	Vajpayee III	Atal Bihari Vajpayee
	Bhavna Chikhalia (1955–2013); MP for Junagadh	29 January 2003	22 May 2004	1 year, 114 days	Bharatiya Janata Party	Vajpayee III	Atal Bihari Vajpayee
Minister of State for Tourism
	Kanti Singh (born 1957); MP for Arrah	6 April 2008	22 May 2009	1 year, 46 days	Rashtriya Janata Dal	Manmohan I	Manmohan Singh
	Sultan Ahmed (1953–2017); MP for Uluberia	28 May 2009	22 September 2012	3 years, 117 days	Trinamool Congress	Manmohan II	Manmohan Singh
	Shripad Naik (born 1952); MP for North Goa	7 July 2021	5 June 2024	5 years, 103 days	Bharatiya Janata Party	Modi II	Narendra Modi
	Ajay Bhatt (born 1961); MP for Nainital–Udhamsingh Nagar	7 July 2021	5 June 2024	5 years, 103 days	Bharatiya Janata Party	Modi II	Narendra Modi
	Suresh Gopi (born 1958); MP for Thrissur	11 June 2024	Incumbent	2 years, 129 days	Bharatiya Janata Party	Modi III	Narendra Modi

== Deputy Ministers ==
No.	Portrait	Minister (Birth-Death) Constituency	Term of office			Political party	Ministry	Prime Minister
No.	Portrait	Minister (Birth-Death) Constituency	From	To	Period	Political party	Ministry	Prime Minister
Deputy Minister for Tourism and Civil Aviation
1		Sarojini Mahishi (1927–2015); MP for Dharwad North	18 March 1971	2 May 1971	45 days	Indian National Congress (Requisitionists)	Indira III	Indira Gandhi
2		Virbhadra Singh (1934–2021); MP for Mandi	31 December 1976	24 March 1977	83 days	Indian National Congress (Requisitionists)	Indira III	Indira Gandhi
Deputy Minister for Tourism
3		Ashok Gehlot (born 1951); MP for Jodhpur	2 September 1982	14 February 1983	165 days	Indian National Congress (Indira)	Indira IV	Indira Gandhi
Deputy Minister for Tourism and Civil Aviation
4		Ashok Gehlot (born 1951); MP for Jodhpur	14 February 1983	7 February 1984	358 days	Indian National Congress (Indira)	Indira IV	Indira Gandhi

== See also ==
- Domestic tourism in India
- India Tourism Development Corporation
- Public sector undertaking
- Tourism in India
- Visa policy of India
