= List of Indian chefs =

This is a list of Indian chefs, who are known for their work in the culinary arts and preparing various types of Indian dishes and recipes.

== Indian chefs ==
Chef Vikas Khanna with Riyo Mori, Miss Universe 2007

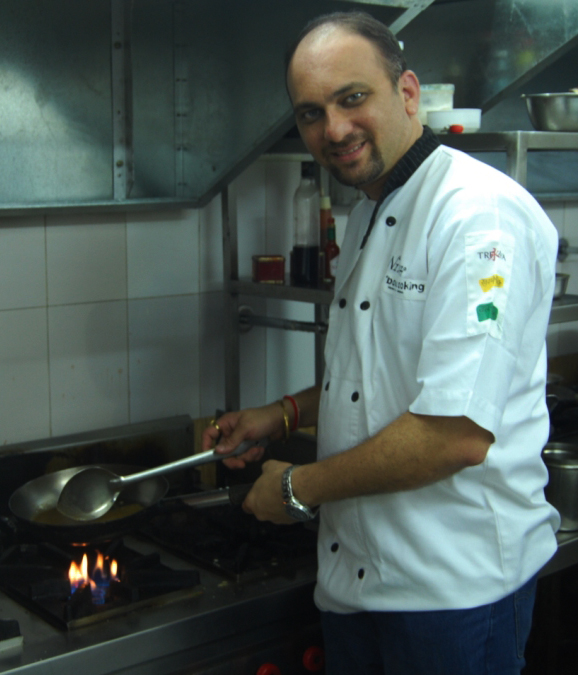
Nilesh Limaye in 2010

Manju Malhi

Some of the notable Indian chefs include:

- Aarti Sequeira (1978–Present)
- Kejal Shah (1998-Present)
- Amit Puri (1979–Present)
- Anjum Anand (1971–Present)
- Surjan Singh Jolly
- Chef Damodharan
- Chef ashad06 (2004-Present)
- Chef Prasad Chirnomula (1988-Present)
- Farrokh Khambata
- Floyd Cardoz (1960–2020)
- Gaggan Anand
- Garima Arora
- Harpal Sokhi
- Hemant Bhagwani
- Imitiaz Qureshi
- Jacob Sahaya Kumar Aruni (1972–2012)
- Karre Mastanamma
- Kumar Mahadevan (1960–Present)
- Kunal Kapur
- M.S. Krishna Iyer
- Madhumita Mohanta
- Madhur Jaffrey (1933–Present)
- Maneet Chauhan (1976–Present)
- Manish Mehrotra (1974–Present)
- Manju Malhi
- Manjunath Mural (1973–Present)
- Mehboob Alam Khan
- Narayana Reddy
- Narayanan Krishnan (1981–Present)
- Nelson Wang (1950–Present)
- Nilesh Limaye (1972–Present)
- Nita Mehta
- Pankaj Bhadouria
- Raji Jallepalli (1949–2002)
- Ranveer Brar (1978–Present)
- Ritu Dalmia (1973–Present)
- Ripudaman Handa
- Romy Gill (1972–Present)
- Sanjay Thumma (1970–Present)
- Sanjeev Kapoor (1964–Present)
- Sathish kumar Gnanam (2003_Present)
- Saransh Goila (1987–Present)
- Shazia Khan
- Shipra Khanna (1981–Present)
- Suvir Saran (1972–Present)
- Tarla Dalal (1936- 2013)
- Varun Inamdar (1984–Present)
- Venkatesh Bhat
- Vikas Khanna (1971–Present)
- Vikram Sunderam
- Vineet Bhatia
- Vishwesh Bhatt
- Vivek Singh (1971–Present)
- Sanjyot keer (2016–Present)

== See also ==
- List of chefs
