= The Womanity Foundation =

Swedish organization

- Founder: Yann Borgstedt
- Type: Private independent foundation
- Headquarters: 51/55 Route des Jeunes, 1227 Carouge, Switzerland
- Website: www.womanity.org

The Womanity Foundation, or Womanity, is an independent private foundation headquartered in Geneva, Switzerland, and was established in 2005 by Swiss entrepreneur and philanthropist Yann Borgstedt. Guided by a vision of a world, where all women and men have equal and full social, economic and political rights.

== History ==
The Womanity Foundation was established in 2005 by Yann Borgstedt, a Swiss businessman. Founded on the premise that a partnership between businesses, social entrepreneurs, and artists could accelerate socio-economic progress and improve the equal participation of women, Borgstedt created the organization, which was originally called The Smiling Children Foundation. The organization's first programs focused on child labor in Morocco to assist domestic servants as young as six to return to their families and have access to education. In 2007, after the Taliban's ban on female education ended, work started in Afghanistan at the Al-Fatah school for girls in Kabul to remove barriers for girls to access education and improve their prospects for the labor market.

In 2009, the organization created its WomenChangeMakers Fellowship program to assist entrepreneurs with programs that benefit women. Raising funds through gala events, where items designed specifically for Womanity are auctioned, the foundation has been able to expand their reach internationally, including operating programs in Afghanistan, Brazil, India, Israel, Mexico, Morocco, and Palestine. In 2011 and 2012 Womanity provided funding to Entrepreneurs du Monde to aid with the reconstruction of Haiti with a program supporting women entrepreneurship with paid jobs, a microcredit scheme, training, and infrastructure.

== Themes ==
The Womanity Foundation focuses its work across four priority areas.

=== Safety and wellbeing ===
To address the issues of physical and sexual violence against women, the Womanity Award for the Prevention of Violence Against Women was launched in 2014, and is given biennially to two organizations which utilize innovative and effective solutions to prevent gender-based violence. The award provides US$300,000.

2014 Womanity Award winners were Promundo, an NGO based in Rio de Janeiro, Brazil, for Program H, which uses group activities and community campaigns to educate young men about respectful and fair behaviour towards women; and Abaad, a non-profit, non-religious, non-politically affiliated organization based in Lebanon dedicated to the advancement, participation and empowerment of women in Lebanon and in the Middle East and North Africa, and through this aim to increase social and economic development.

2016 Womanity Award winners were Take Back the Tech! (Spanish: Dominemos la tecnología!), a campaign in Mexico, led by the Association for Progressive Communications (South Africa); and the television program "Luchadoras" (the female Wrestlers) broadcast by the collective media organization La Sandía Digital. The campaign addresses the widespread problem of online violence against women, enables women to proactively respond to online abuse, claim virtual space and creatively influence policies and practices. The ultimate goal is to build an internet free of violence.

In 2017, Womanity partnered with J Walter Thompson to run an advertising campaign in Brazil to challenge the 1 in 3 people who believe that the clothing a woman wears causes rape rather than rapists.

=== Education and vocational training ===
Although many girls are now enrolling in Afghan schools following the fall of the Taliban regime, schools in the region have few resources and infrastructure is inadequate. In 2007, Womanity began its School in a Box program in the Al-Fatah school, Kabul. Organizational goals were to improve the infrastructure, resources and teaching, while also addressing specific cultural barriers to girls attending school, such as early marriage, and the impact of a lack of qualified female teaching staff as role models.

In 2012, Safeena Husain was a Womanity WomenChangeMakers Fellow. Husain is the founder and Chief Executive of Educate Girls, a non-profit organization devoted to tackling gender inequality in India's education system and to creating a sustainable model for the education of girls. The project has so far helped 80,000 girls enrol in school.

Womanity launched Girls Can Code in Kabul in April 2016 at two of the largest schools in the city.

In 2017 Womanity partnered with Goodwall to launch the Goodwall Womanity Scholarship for female students in the Middle East and Africa to have the opportunity for one year of full-tuition at the Swiss International Scientific School of Dubai; the runner up gains $5,000 tuition towards a university of their choice; and the top twelve students gain a new laptop or tablet.

=== Giving women a voice ===
In 2009, in partnership with the Radio Nisaa Broadcasting Company, Womanity established Radio Nisaa FM in Palestine territories. The station, managed by women, aims to represent women's concerns and issues in a culture where the media is heavily male-dominated. Content is not feminist oriented, but includes news, discussion, music, and investigative reports, created by women. Within five years of its launch, Radio Nisaa had become the fifth largest radio station in terms audience share in the Middle East. Based on the success, new strategy was developed to expand its output across the Arab world by partnering with 10 more media outlets by 2018. Womanity created the Nisaa Network, to coordinate efforts for changing the regional perception of women with media outlets and other women's organizations in Arabic and English languages.

In 2013, Womanity in partnership with Lapis Communication created the Arabic radio drama Be 100 Ragl (Worth 100 Men, Arabic: بميت راجل or Arabic: بـ 100 راجل) about a young female radio journalist who challenges prejudice. It was aired during the month of Ramadan in the Middle East and North Africa. The lead role was played by Mona Zaki and the theme tune to the first series was performed by Nancy Ajram. The second series of Be 100 Ragl was an animation, aired in 2016, followed by panel discussions at the Dutch Institute in Zamalek. Themes such as access to education, domestic violence, sexual harassment, and other topics were portrayed, using humor and positive story lines, to generate discussion on sensitive topics that affect women in the region.

== Awards ==
The Womanity Foundation rose to the 187th position of the Top 500 NGOs in 2016 world-wide ranking by NGO Advisor, a Geneva-based independent media. The ranking identifies social development and humanitarian non-governmental non-profit organisations (NGOs), which excel in innovation, impact and sustainability.
