= Paul Donovan =

Paul Donovan may refer to:

- Paul Donovan (writer) (born 1954), Canadian television and film writer, director and producer
- Paul Donovan (athlete) (born 1963), Irish middle and long distance runner
- Paul Donovan (businessman), CEO of the eircom Group plc
- Paul Vincent Donovan (1924–2011), bishop of the Catholic Church in the United States
- Paul Donovan (economist), author and Global Chief Economist of UBS Wealth Management
