= Mural (disambiguation) =

A mural is any piece of artwork painted or applied directly on a wall, ceiling or other large permanent surface.

Mural may also refer to:

== Arts, entertainment and media ==
- El mural, a 2010 Argentine film
- MURAL Festival, an annual international street art festival in Montreal, Quebec, Canada
- Mural (1943), a painting by American artist Jackson Pollock
- Mural (film), 2011 Chinese film directed by Gordon Chan
- "Mural" (song), 2015 song by Lupe Fiasco
- "Mural", 2026 song by Swae Lee from Same Difference
- Mural (Guadalajara), newspaper in Guadalajara, Mexico

== Natural formations ==
- Mural Formation, a geologic formation that preserves fossils dating back to the Cambrian period, Alberta, Canada
- Mural Nunatak, a nunatak on Hektoria Glacier, Graham Land, Antarctica
- Mural Limestone, a geologic formation in Arizona, U.S.

== Other uses ==
- Manjunath Mural (born 1973), Indian chef
- Mexican muralism, a social and political movement in Mexico starting in the 1920s
- Mural Art Museum, mural arts museum in Kerala, India
- Mural Arts Program, an anti-graffiti mural program in Philadelphia, Pennsylvania, U.S.
- Mural cell, a type of vascular cell
- Mural crown, a headpiece representing city walls or towers
- Mural instrument, an angle-measuring device used for astronomical purposes
- Mural thrombus, a thrombus that adheres to the wall of a blood vessel
- Operation Mural, clandestine effort to facilitate the emigration of Jewish Moroccan children to Israel, 1961
- Torre Mural, a building on Avenida de los Insurgentes in Mexico City, Mexico
