= SOTC =

SOTC may refer to:

== Film ==
- Secret of the Cave (2006 film), a 2006 student film
- The Haunted House: The Secret of the Cave, a 2018 Korean animated film in The Haunted House by Tooniverse

== Literature ==
- The Secret of the Caves, a 1929 book by Leslie McFarlane

== Entertainment ==
- Sale of the Century, television game show
- Scars of the Crucifix, album from death metal band Deicide
- Shadow of the Colossus, video game
- Spirit of the Century, pulp role-playing game
- State of the Culture, an American talk show

== Government ==
- State of the City address, a speech given by a mayor or city manager about the condition of the municipality
- Special Operations Training Course, of the United States Marine Forces Special Operations Command

== Other uses ==
- SOTC Travel, formerly "Kouni SOTC" and "SOTC", an Indian tourism company

== See also ==
- STC (disambiguation)
- SOC (disambiguation)
- SC (disambiguation)
