= Rwanda Men's Resource Centre =

Rwandan non-profit organisation working with men on gender equality

RWAMREC
- Rwanda Men's Resources Centre
- Formation: 2006
- Founder: Rutayisire Fidele
- Headquarters: Kigali city, Kimironko sector
- Affiliations: Rwanda Minstry of Gender and Family Promotion
- Staff: 56
- Website: https://www.rwamrec.org/

Rwanda Men's Resources Centre (RWAMREC) is a non-profit feminist organisation based in Rwanda, that works with men and boys to promote gender equality and reduce gender-based violence. It was founded in 2006 by a group of nine Rwandan men.

It was founded in 2006 by a group of nine Rwandan men.

== History ==
RWAMREC was set up in 2006 by nine men who wanted to involve men in discussions of gender and to promote what they called "positive masculinity". In its early years it received support from the Government of Rwanda and UN Women. Through UN Women funding, RWAMREC trained about 3,000 local leaders on gender-based violence.

== Activities ==
RWAMREC runs group education and community outreach with men and couples. Its trainings have used role-play exercises, for example having men carry out domestic and farm work while carrying a toy child on their back. The organisation has also carried out research used for advocacy, including a 2010 study on masculinities and gender-based violence and a 2013 baseline study on gender-based violence in Rwanda.

== Bandebereho ==
RWAMREC's best-known programme is Bandebereho ("role model" in Kinyarwanda), a couples' programme for expectant and current fathers and their partners. It was implemented with Promundo as part of the MenCare+ initiative.

The curriculum had 15 sessions, with partners attending eight of them. A randomised controlled trial in four Rwandan districts enrolled 575 couples in the intervention group and 624 in the control group. At 21 months, women in the intervention group reported lower past-year physical violence than the control group.

== Reception and critique ==
A qualitative study of 15 men enrolled in RWAMREC's programme found that men who took on tasks seen as feminine were sometimes stigmatised by others in their community, for instance being described as "bewitched" or "not real men". News coverage has reported that findings from the Bandebereho evaluation informed the government's approach to working with men in gender and health policy.
