= Food Food (TV channel) =

Indian television channel

- Country: India
- Broadcast area: India; Mauritius; UAE; Qatar; United States of America; Canada
- Headquarters: Mumbai, Maharashtra, India

Ownership
- Owner: Sanjeev Kapoor, Kartik Gaikwad, Sitaram S. Chourasiya Astro and Mogae Consultants

History
- Launched: January 2011

Links
- Website: foodfood.com

Food Food is an Indian food and lifestyle channel that was launched in January 2011. It is a joint venture between Malaysia-based Astro Overseas Limited (Astro), Sanjeev Kapoor, Kartik Gaikwad and Mogae Consultants. Food Food is available on satellite in India through Tata Sky, Videocon D2H, Airtel Digital TV and other major cable networks and MSOs across India. The channel is also available in US, Canada, UAE, Qatar and Mauritius. Food Food is the first Indian channel that is shot entirely in high definition.

The channel airs cooking and food shows hosted by chefs Sanjeev Kapoor, Ajay Chopra, Vikas Khanna, Saransh Goila, Rakesh Sethi, Shailendra Kekade, Shilarna Vaze, Shipra Khanna, Shazia Khan, Harpal Singh Sokhi, Madhu Sneha, Shantanu Gupte and Amrita Raichand.

== Awards ==
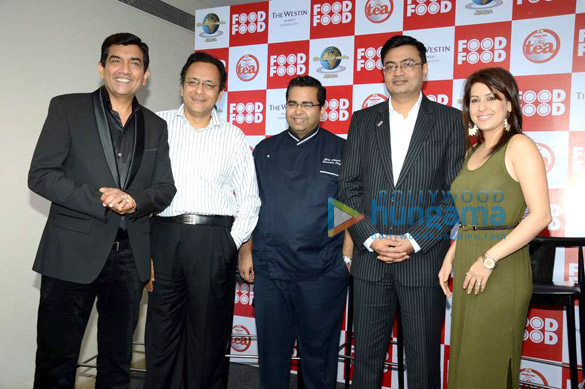
Sanjeev Kapoor, Raghavendra Madhav, Ajay Chopra, Anup Bhatnagar, Amrita Raichand at the press meet of Food Food channel in 2013

FOOD FOOD received three awards at the Indian Telly Awards 2012.

- Best TV Channel Packaging
- Mummy Ka Magic as the Best Cookery Show
- Khata Rahe Mera Dil as the Best Travel Show

== Programs ==
- Royal Rasoi hosted by Chandrachur Singh
- Band Baaja Buffet
- Cook Smart – Chef Sanjeev Kapoor teaches smart and easy ways of preparing Indian and international dishes
- Firangi Tadka – hosted by chefs Saransh Goila and Shilarna Vaze, the show explores the differences and similarities between Indian cuisine and global cuisines
- Food Food Maha Challenge
- Health Mange More
- Mummy Ka Magic – celebrity-turned-chef Amrita Raichand prepares easy and healthy food that children will love to eat; she suggests tips and tricks that can turn a simple home cooked meal into a delicious affair so that the children are encouraged to eat healthy food
- Namaste Breakfast
- Ready Steady Cook
- Sanjeev Kapoor's Kitchen
- Secret Recipes with Sanjeev Kapoor
- Sirf 30 Minute
- Style Chef – Chef Shailendra Kekade shares his exceptional cooking skills with a phenomenal amount of creativity, talent and imagination. He is a recognized food stylist across food and beverages industry, and has extraordinary skills in making every recipe look stunning on a plate.
- Tea Time – chef Rakesh Sethi shares his experiences and experiments in the kitchen with his viewers and prepares Indian and international recipes that can be served during tea or snack time
- Turban Tadka – chef Harpal Singh Sokhi prepares classic Indian dishes and teaches true Desi-style cooking to his viewers in an entertaining manner
- Sunny Side Up – chef Shilarna Vaze, popularly known as chef Chinu, demonstrates in a very chirpy and fun way, some classy and continental food
- Mummy Ka Magic is hosted by model Amrita Raichand.
- Khata Rahe Mera Dil is a show about the famous street food of India. Its host, Gurpal Singh, takes viewers on an entertaining ride as he goes hunting for the best street food in the bazaars.
