= Paul Donovan (businessman) =

British-born businessman and philanthropist (born 1958)

Paul Michael Donovan (born 28 June 1958) is a British-born businessman and philanthropist, recognised for his abilities as a turnaround Chief Executive. He is the Chief Executive Officer of Arqiva Group Ltd since April 2020 and has been a non-executive Director at Thames Water Utilities Ltd since June 2019.

He previously served as Chief Operating Officer of Eircom, Vodafone Ireland and most recently Odeon UCI Cinemas Group. He also served as a Senior Philanthropy Advisor to Chris Hohn between 2017 and 2018, as CEO of the CH Foundation and interim CEO of The Children's Investment Fund Foundation, the 5th largest global development philanthropy in the world.

== Early life ==
Donovan spent his early life in Kent, moving to Watford when he was ten, where he attended Watford Boys Grammar School in 1969. After finishing school in 1976, he moved to London to undertake an undergraduate degree in Scandinavian Studies at the University College London. During his degree he spent a year in Sweden, where he studied the History of Scandinavian Languages at Lund University.

== Early career ==
Donovan started his career as a graduate trainee at Pedigree Petfoods, a division of Mars Incorporated, where he eventually specialised in sales and brand management. After completing a full-time MBA, he joined Coca-Cola and Shweppes Beverages as a Trade Marketing Controller, before becoming Marketing Director. In the early 1990s, he moved into technology, becoming Marketing Director for Apple Computer UK and Ireland, where he helped launch the PowerBook, the company’s first laptop. He then began his telecoms career at British Telecom, before becoming a Commercial Director at One2One, a fast growing mobile operator, and then Optus, a Sydney based mobile and pay TV business.

== Career ==
=== Vodafone (1999-2008) ===
Donovan returned from Australia to join Vodafone in 1999 as a Commercial Managing Director for the UK. A year later, he negotiated the country’s then largest sporting sponsorship deal with Manchester United FC for £36m. He was promoted to CEO of Vodafone Ireland in 2001, where, following the company’s acquisition and rebranding of Eircell he helped launch Ireland’s most successful 3G service. In 2004, he was promoted to Vodafone Group’s Executive Committee, becoming Regional Chief Executive. In 2006, he assumed responsibility for the Group’s operations across the EMAPA region, which included Hungary, Czech Republic, Romania, Turkey, Egypt, Kenya, South Africa, Mozambique, Lesotho, Democratic Republic of Congo, India, Fiji, Australia and New Zealand. He was also responsible for the Group’s investments in China Mobile, Bharti Airtel, SFR and Verizon Wireless, and served on the board of all four companies. During this time, he also helped launch Indus Towers, India’s largest mobile tower company, a three-way joint venture between Vodafone, Bharti and Idea Cellular. Donovan stepped down at the end of 2008, following the appointment of Vittorio Colao as Vodafone’s CEO.

=== Eircom (2009-2012) ===
Donovan was appointed Chief Executive Officer of the Irish telecommunications company Eircom in July 2009. The company, which had been described by commentators as “the Greece of Irish corporate life” had experienced four changes in ownership in ten years, had accumulated €4.0bn of debt and was reeling from the Financial Crisis. Donovan led the company’s transformation programme, restructuring corporate debt at a scale never seen before in Ireland. He secured investment from ST Telemedia and agreed an £85m cost reduction programme with the unions. He also established a joint venture with Telefonica and secured a £90m investment in fibre based internet services, as well as helping launch a range of new wholesale products. In 2012, Donovan led the company through Examinership, a process in Irish law whereby the protection of the Court is obtained to assist the survival of a company. As a result, €1.7bn of debt was written off, securing the future of the company. He was also served as the Chairman of the Irish Telecoms and Internet Federation between 2010 and 2012.

=== Odeon and UCI Cinemas (2014-2016) ===
Donovan was appointed Chief Executive Officer Odeon UCI Cinemas Group, Europe’s leading cinema operator, by the private equity firm Terra Firma Capital Partners in February 2014. Donovan was an open critic of the cinema industry’s inward focus and poor digital track record. He introduced a number new innovations in pricing, digital marketing and guest experience, which helped boost the company’s performance and public image. Respected industry commentator John Sullivan described Donovan’s impact saying: “the fortunes of this beleaguered icon of UK cinema were seemingly transformed overnight” and Odeon’s leadership as “a textbook case on how to bring a business back from the brink”. In November 2016, having helped turn the company around, he facilitated its acquisition by AMC Theatres for £921m. This made AMC Theatres the world’s largest cinema operator. AMC’s CEO Adam Aron was quoted saying “We congratulate Paul Donovan on his successful leadership of Odeon. He is a talented executive who has made a difference to the business”

== Non-Executive roles ==
He served as a non-Executive Director at Millicom between 2009 and 2016, the mobile technology company Upstream SA between 2016 and 2019 and as an Associate Director at Milton Keynes Dons F.C. between 2017 and 2018.

== Philanthropy ==
Donovan became a Senior Philanthropy Advisor to billionaire hedge fund manager Chris Hohn in 2017. He was appointed CEO of the CH Foundation and interim CEO of the CH Foundation and interim CEO of The Children's Investment Fund Foundation, the 5th largest global development philanthropy in the world. In 2018 he became a trustee of the Oxfordshire Community Foundation, which helps disadvantaged people living in Oxfordshire, England He is also the founder of two private charitable funds, Our Common Good, a social impact accelerator and the Daymark Fund, an educational charity, which focuses on helping young talent in lesser and middle income countries.

== Education ==
- Watford Boys Grammar School (1969-1976)
- BA Honours in Scandinavian Studies - University College London (1977-1981)
- History of Scandinavian Language- University of Lund (1979-1980)
- Masters in Business Administration – University of Bradford (1988-1989)
- Doctor of the University – University of Bradford (2016)

== Personal life ==
Donovan now lives in Oxfordshire and is a keen Arsenal fan.
