= Nilesh Limaye =

Indian celebrity chef (born 1972)

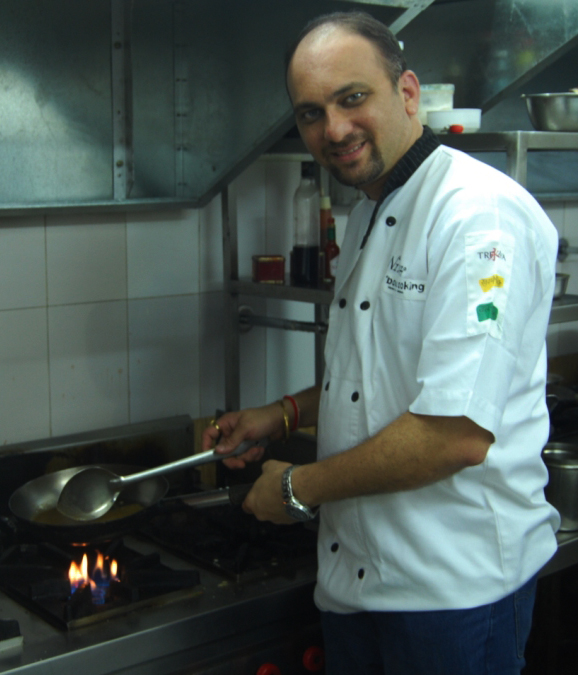
- Nilesh Limaye, 2010
- Born: Nilesh Arun Limaye; 24 November 1972 (age 53); Thane, India
- Education: MSHIMCT, Pune
- Spouse: Meghna Limaye (m. 1996)
- Culinary career
- Cooking style: Indian/Japanese/Thai/Chinese/ Italian/Indonesian/Mediterranean
- Current restaurant(s): Zikomo (Pune) Trikaya (Pune) Trikaya (Mumbai) Gypsy Chinese (Dubai) Tenzo Temple(Thane)
- Previous restaurant(s): Taj Mahal hotel Hawar Resorts Intercontinental Gordan House Suites Rodas The Orchid
- Television show(s): Amhi Saare Khavvaiyye Mallika-E-Kitchen Season 2

Nilesh Limaye (Marathi: नीलेश लिमये, romanized: Nilesh Limye) is an Indian celebrity chef. He has successfully worked as a tv host, author and contributor to various magazines and a restaurant consultant. He is nicknamed "Sindbad the Chef" owing to his frequent travels. He manages his own entrepreneurial venture "All 'Bout Cooking" providing food and everage solutions to new entrants, entrepreneurs or existing restaurateurs. Zikomo (Pune), Trikaya (Pune), Gypsy Chinese (Dubai) and Tenzo Temple (Thane) are among the restaurant brands that he works with.

== Early life ==
Born in a Marathi family in Mumbai, he spent his childhood and college days in Pune. He is an alumnus from MSHIMCT, Pune.

== Training ==
After working at a hotel for two years, he resolved to make cooking his career. He trained under Grande Chef Emeritus, Hemant Oberoi, at the Taj Hotels. He worked with chef Sanjay Malkani and chef Satish Arora.

Along with his expertise in Maharashtrian, Punjabi, Mangalorean, Kerala and North Indian food, he is expert in Japanese, Thai, Chinese, Italian, Indonesian, and Mediterranean cuisines.

He trained in various kitchen setups, from fine dining to large scale buffets. He worked with the flight catering unit of Taj Air Caterers and handled the kitchen for the Hiranandani hospital.

He credits a lot of his learning to travel. He managed kitchens at Hawar, a small resort owned by Emir of Bahrain on the Island of Hawar. He traveled to Norway, Funiculor, the Panama Canal, the tribes on a Mexican island, Denmark, Buckingham Palace, and New Orleans allowed him to explore the richness of cuisine.

== Career ==
=== Cooking ===
His training in the Taj Mahal Hotel under Grande Chef Emeritus Hemant Oberoi was followed by his stint at Hawar Resorts in Bahrain.

While setting up a hotel, Limaye worked with Chef Sanjay Malkani to learn about kitchen design, supplier negotiations, festival menus, food costing, etc.

He later worked with Taj Air Caterers and various cruises. He led teams of Chefs churning out food at restaurants from a coffee shop to fine dining to northwestern frontier cuisine and a lounge bar.

=== Restaurants ===
As a chef he associated with many restaurants including Taj Mahal hotel, Hawar Resorts, Intercontinental, Gordan House Suites, Rodas, The Orchid, TAJ SATS, and Hiranandani Hospital.

Trikaya, Pune

He has worked with many restaurants as a consultant/technical partner offering his expertise in issues including kitchen design, menu planning and enhancements, and cost control.

The list includes:

- Indraprastha Restaurant and Food plaza, Pune, which specializes in Maharashtrian food
- Zikomo, Pune, which serves contemporary Western International food along with regional Indian dishes
- Trikaya, Pune, winner of the Times Good Food Guide "Best Pan Asian Restaurant" twice in its first three years of operation
- Gypsy Chinese, Dubai, which specializes in Chinese and Thai cuisine.
- Tenzo Temple, Thane, a multi-cuisine restaurant.

=== Books ===
Nilesh is the author of successful culinary books. His breakfast cookbook Good Morning Cookbook along with Good Morning Nyahari and Chaupati food authored in Marathi are popular among food enthusiasts.

=== Television ===
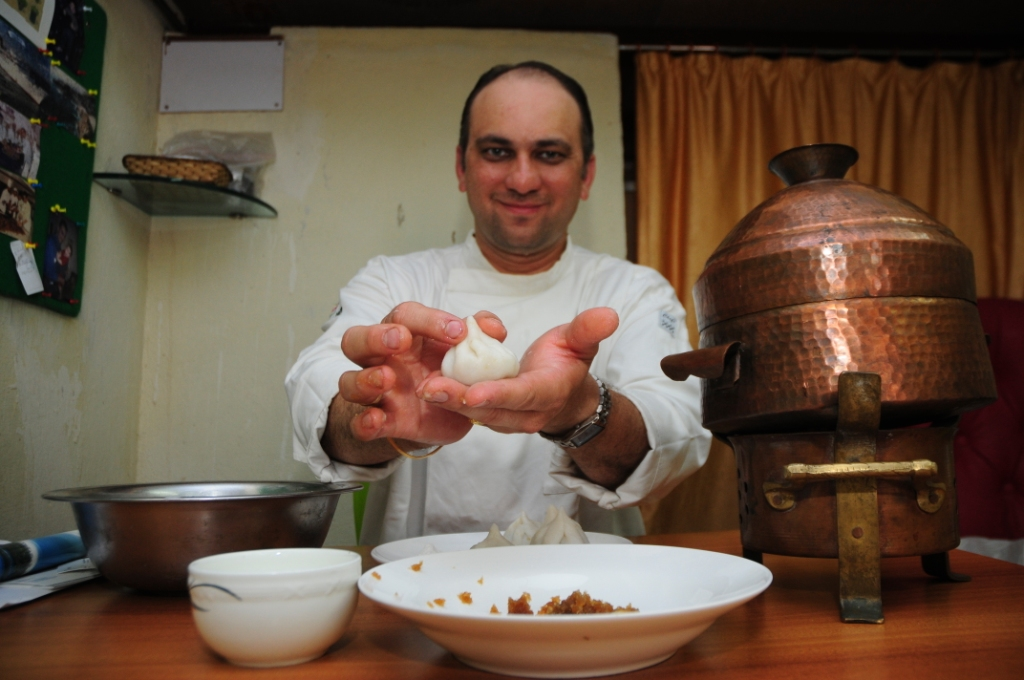
Nilesh on his TV show

He was a consultant chef and host to one of the weekly episodes in TV show Amhi Sare Khawaiye. Amhi Saare Khavvaiyye (We all Gourmet) is a popular cooking show on Zee Marathi (an Indian regional channel).

He was the Host Judge of Mallika-E-Kitchen show on Colors.

== Philanthropy ==
He is a member of Western India Chefs Association affiliated to the Indian Federation of Culinary Arts. Limaye actively participated in various community welfare programs during the Culinary Congress held in 2007.

He organized a charity luncheon and Blood Donation Camp on International Chefs Day. He was the tastemaker for the Shiv Vada Pav concept. The Shiv Vada Pav scheme was Shiv Sena's ambitious project to globalise the city's trademark dish, while providing employment to Marathi youth.
