= Saumya Tandon =

Indian actress and host (born 1984)

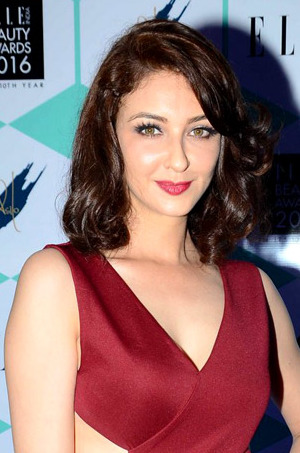
- Tandon in 2016
- Born: 3 November 1984 (age 42); Bhopal, Madhya Pradesh, India
- Occupations: Model; actress; television personality
- Years active: 2006–present
- Known for: Jab We Met; Bhabhi Ji Ghar Par Hai! Dhurandhar ’’Mallika-E-Kitchen’’
- Spouse: Saurabh Devendra Singh (m. 2016)
- Children: 1

Saumya Tandon (born 3 November 1984) is an Indian actress and television presenter, known for her portrayal of Anita Vibhuti Narayan Mishra in the Hindi sitcom television series Bhabiji Ghar Par Hain!. and as a host on various TV shows including Dance India Dance, Bournvita Quiz Contest and Entertainment Ki Raat. She also gained recognition from the films Jab We Met (2007) and Dhurandhar (2025).

== Early life ==
Tandon was born in Bhopal, Madhya Pradesh, on 3 November 1984. The family shifted to Ujjain where she completed her schooling from St. Mary's Convent School. Her father, B.G. Tandon, is a writer and was a professor in a university in Ujjain.

== Career ==
Tandon took up modelling assignments early in her career and was the "Femina Cover Girl First Runner Up" 2006 She also appeared in the Afghan serial Khushi in 2008 as part of the international project, where she played the lead of an Afghan woman doctor. She co-hosted Zor Ka Jhatka: Total Wipeout (based on the Wipeout format) with Shah Rukh Khan in 2011. She has hosted Dance India Dance for 3 seasons, for which she got the Best Anchor award too. She co-hosted Bournvita Quiz Contest, along with Derek O'Brien for three seasons. In Imtiaz Ali's Jab We Met, starring Shahid Kapoor and Kareena Kapoor, she played the role of Kareena's character's sister Roop. She also hosted LG Mallika-e-Kitchen for three seasons.

In 2015, Tandon started playing the role of Anita in the comedy serial Bhabiji Ghar Par Hain!. She is also known as "gori mem" from the serial, due to her being referred to as the same in the show by Yogesh Tripathi's character. In 2018, she hosted the second season of Entertainment Ki Raat on Colors TV. On 21 August 2020, she quit Bhabhi Ji Ghar Par Hain!.

In 2025, she gained further recognition portraying Ulfat, wife of Akshaye Khanna character Rehman Dakait, in the spy-thriller Dhurandhar and Dhurandhar: The Revenge.

== Personal life ==
In 2016, she married her boyfriend Saurabh Devendra Singh whom she was in a ten-year relationship with.

Tandon gave birth to a boy in 2019.

== Filmography ==
Key
†	Denotes films that have not yet been released

=== Films ===
Year	Title	Role	Notes	Ref.
2007	Jab We Met	Roop Dhillon		
2011	Welcome to Punjab	Preet	Punjabi Film	
2024	Radio Ghaint	Amrita Dhillon		
2025	Dhurandhar	Ulfat		
2026	Dhurandhar: The Revenge	Ulfat		
2026	Yeh Prem Mol Liya †	TBA		

=== Television ===
Year	Title	Role	Notes
2006	Aisa Des Hai Mera	Rusty Deol	
2007	Meri Awaz Ko Mil Gayi Roshni	Ria Sahani	
2008	Khushi	Khushi	Afghan TV serial
2009–2012	Dance India Dance	Host	
2011–2014	Bournvita Quiz Contest	Host	
2010–2013	Mallika-E-Kitchen	Host	
2011	Comedy Circus Ke Taansen	Host	
2011	Zor Ka Jhatka: Total Wipeout	Host	
2014	Comedy Nights with Kapil	Comedian	Special appearance
2015–2020	Bhabiji Ghar Par Hain!	Anita Vibhuti Narayan Mishra	
2018	Entertainment Ki Raat	Host	

== See also ==
- List of Hindi television actresses
- List of Indian television actresses
- List of Indian film actresses
