= Food Food Maha Challenge =

Indian competitive cooking game show

Food Food Maha Challenge is an Indian competitive cooking game show on Food Food TV channel. It is produced by FremantleMedia. Chef Sanjeev Kapoor and Madhuri Dixit serve as the show's main judges.

The first episode aired on 9 September 2011, and the season one finale was broadcast on 2 December 2011. The first winner of Food Food Maha Challenge was Saransh Goila, a 24-year-old actor and chef from Delhi.

== Format ==
Initial rounds consist of a large number of hopeful contestants from across India individually "auditioning" by presenting a food dish before the judges in order to gain one of top 16 places. The contestants will then be whittled down through a number of individual and team-based cooking challenges and weekly elimination rounds until a winning SuperChef is crowned. The winner plays for a prize that includes getting to host a cookery show on FoodFood, the chance to have their own cookbook published, and a cash prize.
