= Hansal Mehta =

Indian film director (born 1968)

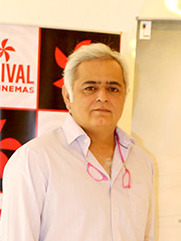
- Mehta in 2016
- Born: 29 April 1968 (age 58)
- Occupations: Director; producer; screenwriter
- Years active: 1993–present
- Spouses: Sunita Mehta (divorced) Safeena Husain (m. 2022)
- Children: 4
- Relatives: Yusuf Hussain (father-in-law)

Hansal Mehta (born 29 April 1968) is an Indian filmmaker. He started his career with television show Khana Khazana (1993–2000) and later moved on to directing films like Dil Pe Mat Le Yaar!! (2000), Yeh Kya Ho Raha Hai? (2002) and Woodstock Villa (2008). He received critical acclaim with Shahid (2013), for which he won the National Film Award for Best Direction. He was nominated for a Filmfare Critics Award for Best Film for Faraaz (2023). He directed the television series Scam 1992 (2020), for which he won the Filmfare OTT Award for best director and Scoop (2023), which won the Asia Contents Awards & Global OTT Award for best Asian television series.

== Early life ==
Mehta was born on 29 April 1968 in a middle-class Gujarati family from Mumbai. He grew up learning classical music and studied computer engineering. He worked in Fiji before returning to India to start his career in films.

== Career ==
Mehta started his career in 1993, by directing with TV cookery show Khana Khazana, thus launching the television career of celebrity chef Sanjeev Kapoor on Zee TV. Alongside, Mehta also directed several television series like Amrita (1994), Highway (1995), Yaadein (1995), Lakshya (1998), Neeti (1998) and many more.

He made his debut as a feature film director with ...Jayate, a part of the Indian Panorama 1999–2000 at the International Film Festival of India (IFFI), Hyderabad. This was later followed by Dil Pe Mat Le Yaar!! (2000) a bittersweet migrant tale set in Mumbai. This film, though not a huge box-office success continues to enjoy a following for its dark humour and its exploration of life on the fringes of Mumbai. Later that year he came up with Chhal (2002) a stylised gangster film that met with more praise than his previous films. By his own admission the films post-Chhal were disappointing and his career entered a phase where he flirted with formulaic mainstream themes. He made his presence felt with a short film in Dus Kahaniyaan, (2007) titled High on the Highway, which was basically a retelling of a short (Highway) that he directed for television in 1995, based on a script by Vishal Bhardwaj. In 2008, after the release of Woodstock Villa, he went on an extended sabbatical to explore life as a foodie, entrepreneur and to explore themes that mattered to him.

Mehta truly came into the lime-light with his film, Shahid (2013), starring Rajkummar Rao. Shahid had its world premier at the 2012 Toronto International Film Festival following which it had an extended run at various international film festivals around the world. This film was later acquired by Disney-UTV and commercially released in October 2013. A biographical film on the life of human rights lawyer Shahid Azmi, who was murdered in 2010. This film continues to shine a light on human rights and the Indian judicial system and is highly rated on various digital streaming platforms like Netflix and Amazon Prime. Hansal was honoured with the 61st National Film Award for Best Direction while Rajkummar Rao won the 61st National Film Award for Best Actor for Shahid.

After their success together, Hansal Mehta teamed again with Rajkummar Rao to make the acclaimed CityLights (an official adaptation of the British Indie hit Metro Manila) for Fox Star Studios and Mahesh Bhatt. After CityLights, Mehta directed, Aligarh (2016) based on a Marathi professor and poet who was suspended by his university for being gay. This film premiered at the 20th Busan International Film Festival followed by the BFI London Film Festival. Aligarh was the opening film at the 17th Jio MAMI Mumbai Film Festival. Based on a script by his long time collaborator Apurva Asrani (previous collaborations Chhal, Shahid, CityLights), Aligarh featured three of Mehta's favourite actors Manoj Bajpayee (with whom he reunited after Dil Pe Mat Le Yaar in 2000), Ashish Vidyarthi (after Highway in 1995) and Rajkummar Rao (their third collaboration since Shahid). Aligarh was presented and co-produced by Eros International.

=== 2020–present ===
In October 2020, he co-directed Sony Liv show Scam 1992 with his own son Jai Mehta. It was based on the 1992 Indian stock market scam committed by many stockbrokers including Harshad Mehta, the series is adapted from journalist Sucheta Dalal and Debashish Basu's 1992 book The Scam: Who Won, Who Lost, Who Got Away. It received critical acclaim from critics and audience for performances (especially Gandhi's), direction, writing and other technical aspects. Sayan Ghosh of The Hindu wrote "Scam 1992: The Harshad Mehta Story is a well-written show with its lead characters doing all the heavy lifting. Despite its flaws, it provides an intriguing sneak-peek at the untapped potential of homegrown content creators — and what they are capable of — if allowed to run wild with their imagination." Ronak Kotecha, editor-in-chief of The Times of India gave three-and-a-half of five stating "The fact that it's a real story that captured the country's collective imagination makes for a riveting watch. It's almost like our very own desi version of The Wolf of Wall Street and we're quite bullish that it will keep you invested." Jyoti Sharma Bawa of Hindustan Times said, "Hansal Mehta digs deep into the India of 80s and 90s to tell us the story of the securities scam that shook up the country. Harshad Mehta's boom-to-bust story is emblematic of its time, but not limited to it." Subhra Gupta of The Indian Express stated "The Hansal Mehta directed series does a smart balancing act, never quite tipping over into Harshad Mehta adulation, nor showing him as an unmitigated villain." Devasheesh Pandey of News18, gave three-and-a-half out of five stars and stated "Scam 1992: The Harshad Mehta Story does not pronounce guilty verdict on India's first financial sector scamster, but presents us with a morally dubious character and leaves it our sensibilities whether to make him a messiah or a pariah." Tatsam Mukherjee, writing for Firstpost, summarised "In spite of all the research, the show never quite transports us into Harshad's mind — the greed, the compulsive need to be surrounded by materialist things, the arrogance of taking on the government, and the tragedy of a 'pioneer' turned into an outcast." Scroll's chief editor Nandini Ramanath reviewed "Scam 1992 provides ample evidence of Mehta's dishonesty over 500-plus minutes, only to float the idea that the system was the bigger villain. This bull got big but then ran into the wolves who were stronger, the series lamely suggests." Moumita Bhattacharya of Rediff gave three-and-a-half out of five and stated "Hansal Mehta's nine-hour drama series Scam 1992 needs to be viewed by everyone, young and old." The News Minute's Saraswati Darar wrote "Scam 1992: The Harshad Mehta Story, it's a compellingly told labour of love that deserves to be watched." Shefali Deshpande of Bloomberg Quint gave four-and-a-half out of five stating, "Scam 1992 taps into the psychological need to succeed and have prestige." Amman Khurana of Zoom TV, gave four out of five and stated "Scam 1992 – The Harshad Mehta Story, despite being significantly long, never goes off track and keeps you glued till the end. The deft direction, skilfully-stitched screenplay and thorough research do the job." Shubham Kulkarni of Koimoi, gave four out of five and stated "It is one of those rare shows where the primary layer is the only thing to hook on, and the writing does wonders here."

Hansal Mehta directed the 2023 film Faraaz, which is based on the attack on Holey Artisan Cafe, that shook Bangladesh in July 2016.

In 2024, Mehta's The Buckingham Murders, a British crime drama film was released in theatres. The film follows Detective Jaspreet Bhamra, played by Kareena Kapoor Khan, a grieving cop who, after the tragic murder of her own child, relocates to a small town in the UK. There, she is tasked with investigating the mysterious disappearance of another child. As Bhamra delves into the case, she confronts her own trauma and grief, while uncovering dark secrets that challenge her understanding of justice and closure. The film explores deep themes of loss, the immigrant experience, and the emotional complexities of seeking justice in a fractured world. Entirely shot in the UK, The Buckingham Murders evokes the moody, atmospheric qualities of British crime thrillers while offering a poignant, character-driven story. Critics have praised Mehta's directorial prowess and Kapoor's commanding performance. The Independent hailed it as "a masterful blend of suspense and character-driven storytelling, with Kapoor delivering one of her best performances to date." With its moody cinematography, intricate plot, and a standout performance from Kareena Kapoor, The Buckingham Murders has been celebrated as one of the most compelling crime dramas of the year.

In September 2024, Hansal wrapped shoot on his most ambitious project - Gandhi, an 8 part series produced by Applause Entertainment featuring Pratik Gandhi as Mohandas Karamchand Gandhi. The series features Harry Potter star Tom Felton and James Murray of The Crown, among other international actors. Oscar winning composer A.R. Rahman, has been signed on to create the musical score for the series.

== Personal life ==
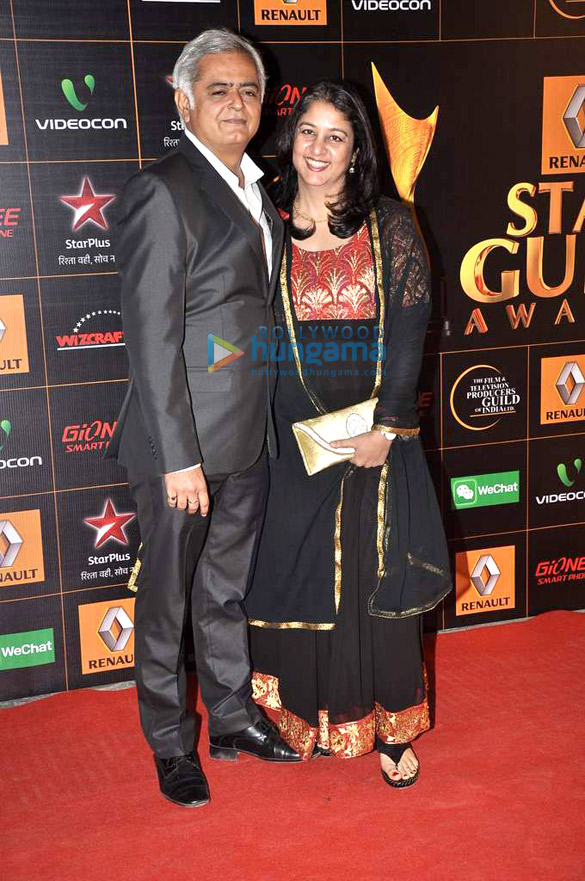
Hansal Mehta with his wife Safeena Husain

Mehta married Sunita in his 20s, with whom he has two sons—Jay, who is a director and Pallava. After divorcing Sunita, Mehta dated actor Yusuf Hussain's daughter Safeena, with whom he has two daughters—Kimaya and Rehana. In 2022, Mehta married Safeena in a small ceremony in California.

== Filmography ==
=== Film ===
List of Hansal Mehta film credits
Year	Title	Director	Producer	Writer	Notes
1999	Jayate	Yes	No	Yes	
2000	Dil Pe Mat Le Yaar	Yes	No	No	
2002	Chhal	Yes	No	No	
2002	Yeh Kya Ho Raha Hai?	Yes	No	No	
2005	Anjaan	Yes	No	No	
2007	Dus Kahaniyaan	Yes	No	Yes	Anthology film
2008	Woodstock Villa	Yes	No	No	
2010	Raakh	Yes	No	Story	
2013	Shahid	Yes	No	Yes	
2014	CityLights	Yes	No	No	
2015	Aligarh	Yes	No	No	
2017	Simran	Yes	No	No	
2017	Omerta	Yes	No	Yes	
2018	Garbage	No	Yes	No	
2019	The Accidental Prime Minister	No	Creative	No	
2020	Chhalaang	Yes	No	No	
2022	Faraaz	Yes	No	No	
2023	The Buckingham Murders	Yes	No	No	
2024	Dedh Bigha Zameen	No	Yes	No	
2026	Birds in the Dark	No	Yes	No	

=== Television ===
Year	Title	Functioned as				Notes
Year	Title	Director	Executive Producer	Writer	Creator	Notes
1993–1999	Khana Khazana	Yes	No	No	Yes	
1994	Kalakaar	Yes	No	No	No	
1998	Lakshya	Yes	No	No	No	
1999	Star Bestsellers	Yes	No	No	No	Episode: "Neeti (The Frog and the Scorpion)"
2004	Family Business	Yes	No	No	No	
2017	Bose: Dead/Alive	No	Creative	No	No	
2020	Locked in Love	No	Yes	No	No	
2020	Scam 1992	Yes	Yes	No	No	Co-directed with Jai Mehta
2022	Modern Love: Mumbai	Yes	No	Yes	No	Episode: "Baai"
2023	Scoop	Yes	No	No	Yes	Co-created with Mrunmayee Lagoo Waikul
2023	Scam 2003	No	Yes	No	No	
2024	Lootere	No	No	No	Yes	Co-created with Shailesh R. Singh
2025-present	Gandhi	Yes	No	No	Yes	Co-created with Sameer Nair
2026	Khana Dil Se	No	No	Yes	Yes	Co-created with Shamsher Ahmed
2026	Family Business †	Yes	Yes	No	Yes	Post-production
2027	Scam 2010 †	Yes	No	No	TBA	Filming

== Accolades ==
List of Hansal Mehta accolades
Award	Year	Category	Nominee(s) / work(s)	Result	Ref.
Filmfare OTT Awards	2021	Best Director	Scam 1992: The Harshad Mehta Story	Won	
Filmfare OTT Awards	2023	Best Director	Scoop	Nominated	
Asia Contents Awards & Global OTT Awards	2023	Best Asian TV Series	Scoop	Won	
Filmfare Awards	2024	Best Film (Critics)	Faraaz	Nominated	
Filmfare Awards	2025	Best Film (Critics)	The Buckingham Murders	Nominated	
