= Entrepreneurs du Monde =

- Founded: June 19, 1998; 27 years ago
- Founder: Franck Renaudin
- Type: Non-governmental organization (French Association Act 1901)
- Purpose: Microfinance
- Location: Poitiers, Vienne, France
- Origins: France
- Region served: West Africa, South Asia, south West Asia, Caribbean
- Method: Creation or partnering with local institutions
- Key people: Franck Renaudin
- Employees: 10
- Volunteers: 3
- Website: www.entrepreneursdumonde.org
- Formerly called: Crédit Développement

Entrepreneurs du Monde is a French international nongovernmental organization founded in 1998 and operating in ten countries of West Africa, the Caribbean and Asia.

The organisation supports microfinance programmes with a strong social orientation, which target thousands of very deprived women and men. The focus is laid on promoting their entrepreneurship spirit by supporting them in their attempt to develop an economic activity. It developed a strategic partnership with ID Ghana in 2007.

== History ==
The organisation was created in Colombes, Hauts-de-Seine, France in June 1998 by its present Director, Franck Renaudin.

Entrepreneurs du Monde initially ran thanks to the voluntary contribution of its members and was contributing to existing programmes in the Philippines, and in India. In 2003, the activity started to develop and the first permanent employee was hired. In November the same year, the head office was transferred to Poitiers (86), France, in a building shared with the NGO Initiative Développement. In 2004 and 2005, Initiative Développement decided to hand over its microfinance programmes in Benin, in Ghana and in Haiti to Entrepreneurs du Monde.

Parallel to this, the organisation developed new programmes in the Philippines (2005), in India (2006), Cambodia (2006), Vietnam (2007), Mongolia (2008) as well as Burkina Faso (2008), while a technical follow-up agreement was signed in Myanmar with a rural lending programme in the Southern part of the country (2005).

== Socio-economic approach ==
Entrepreneurs du Monde claims it supported 59,600 microentrepreneurs in 2009. Its objective is to support even more people through its programmes spread in ten countries around the world in 2010, by providing them with following services:

1. Loan products (microcredit), to finance the creation or the development of a small economic activity, in urban or rural environment;
2. Savings product (microsavings) to reinforce the capacity of families to manage their budget and to anticipate their needs;
3. Health microinsurance, to reduce the vulnerability of families and preserve economic progresses achieved previously;
4. Trainings: trainings on economic subjects (family budget management, profit calculation, etc.); trainings on social topics (malaria prevention, man/woman rapport, etc.); vocational and practical trainings (cooking, cosmetology, hair-dressing, manicure, etc.);
5. Social Permanencies: in urban branches, a social worker provides most deprived microentrepreneurs with counselling and refers them to specialised organisation able to bring them complementary support;
6. Social entrepreneurship: to promote certain activities identified as affecting society on one hand, and economically viable on the other hand. Most are innovative activities which can affect health (production of spirulina, horse milk, carabao milk), shelter (building of houses using the Nubian vault technology, manufacturing of paper bricks for cooking combustible) or environment (improved stoves). Entrepreneurs du Monde tries here to focus its contribution on the structuring of an economic chain.

Partner Organisations by Country
Country	Partner Organisation	Place
Benin	Association de Lutte pour la promotion des Initiatives de Développement (ALIDé)	Cotonou
Burkina Faso	Association Inter Instituts "Ensemble et Avec" (AsIEnA)	Ouagadougou
Burkina Faso	Laafi Sira Kwieogo (LSK)	Ouagadougou
Burkina Faso	Micro Start	Ouagadougou
Cambodia	Chamroeun	Phnom Penh
Cambodia	Sovann Phoum	Phnom Penh
Ghana	Initiative Development Ghana	Accra
Ghana	Village Exchange Ghana	Ho
Haiti	Initiative de Développement par la Microfinance	Port-au-Prince, Cabaret
India	Navnirman Community Resource Center (NCRC)	Kolkata
Mongolia	Gumi	Khishig-Öndör
Myanmar	Yadana Suboo	Kanbauk
Philippines	Gabay Buhay	Manila
Philippines	Inner City Development Corporation (ICDC)	Manila
Philippines	SEED	Cavite City
Philippines	Space	Manila
Philippines	Uplift Philippines	Manila
Vietnam	Chi Em	Ðiện Biên Phủ

== Structure and financing ==
Entrepreneurs du Monde is an organisation registered under the Association Act 1901 of the French law. It is a not-for-profit organisation which was employing on 31 December 2009 10 permanent employees and 3 volunteers based in the head office of Poitiers (Vienne) and different programmes in Burkina Faso, Cambodia, Ghana, India, the Philippines and Vietnam.

Entrepreneurs du Monde is financed by private sources (mostly individuals and foundations) as well as public ones, the first of which being the French Development Agency (Agence française de développement or AFD). In 2011 and 2012 the Womanity Foundation provided Entrepreneurs du Monde with funding to aid with the reconstruction of Haiti with a program supporting women entrepreneurship with paid jobs, a microcredit scheme, training, and infrastructure.

== Notes and references ==
This article is based on a translation of the corresponding article from the French Wikipedia, retrieved on 28 June 2010.
