= Khana Khazana =

Indian cookery show

- Directed by: Girish Madhu; Nitesh Choudhary; Hansal Mehta
- Starring: Sanjeev Kapoor
- Country of origin: India
- No. of episodes: 649

Production
- Running time: approx. 45 minutes

Original release
- Network: Zee TV
- Release: 1993 – 8 September 2012

Khana Khazana (transl. Food treasure) was an Indian Hindi-language cookery show hosted by Indian chef, Sanjeev Kapoor. The show was primarily based upon Indian cuisine.

The show was directed by Hansal Mehta.

== Overview ==
The first episode of the show was hosted by Harpal Singh Sokhi. The subsequent episodes were hosted by Sanjeev Kapoor. Occasionally, Chef Kapoor brought in various celebrity guests and viewer recipes are also displayed. Over the course of the show, Chef Kapoor had become more conscious and concerned about food-related diseases and cooked low-fat and healthy meals.
