= Harpal Singh Sokhi =

Indian celebrity chef and restaurateur (born 1966)

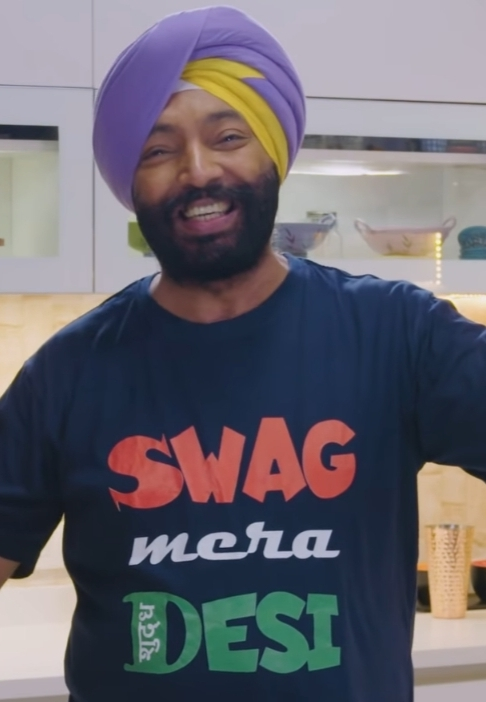
- Sokhi in 2020
- Born: 1966 (age 59–60); Kharagpur, West Bengal, India
- Occupations: Chef; restaurateur
- Education: Diploma in Hotel Management from IHM, Bhubaneswar
- Spouse: Aparna Sokhi (m. 1996)
- Culinary career
- Cooking style: Indian Cuisine
- Current restaurants: Karigari Noida sector 51; Karigari Advant Noida Secto 137; Karigari WorldMarkII Gurugram; The Treasury Boston
- Television shows: Khana Khazana on Zee TV; Harpal ki Rasoi on Siti Cable TV; Turban Tadka on Food Food; Kitchen Khiladi on Food Food; Sirf Tees Minute on Food Food; Desh da Swaad on Zee TV; Jhalak Dikhla Jaa S9
- Website: harpalssokhi.com
- Website: https://www.foodfood.com/chef/chef-harpal-singh-sokhi/

Harpal Singh Sokhi (born 1966) is an Indian celebrity chef and restaurateur. He began his career in 1987 at The Oberoi in Bhubaneswar, becoming an executive chef six years later. Over the following years, he worked at several luxury hotel chains in India. He is best known for using the catchphrase "Namak Shamak".

== Early life ==
Harpal Singh Sokhi grew up in Kharagpur, West Bengal, India where his father worked with the Indian Railways. He has two older sisters and one brother. He studied at the South Eastern Railway Mixed Higher Secondary School. He was inspired to become a chef by his mother's cooking. His father travelled a lot for work, and encouraged his kids to try a lot of different cuisines. His brother also cooked food at a langar.

Inspired by the academic atmosphere in Kharagpur (which is home to IIT Kharagpur), Sokhi initially wanted to pursue engineering, but was not good at studies. He also expressed interest in joining the Indian Air Force (IAF), but by the time he decided to apply, he had crossed the maximum age limit. He came to know about the hotel management career from a friend who studied in Siliguri, West Bengal. Sokhi's brother encouraged him to appear for the hotel management entrance exam, and Sokhi enrolled at the Institute of Hotel Management (IHM), Bhubaneswar in 1984.

== Culinary career ==
In 1987, Sokhi completed his diploma in catering from IHM Bhubaneswar. He started his career as a trainee cook at The Oberoi in Bhubaneswar. At 27, he became an executive chef. Sokhi spent several years in learning different international cuisines. He learnt Hyderabadi cooking from Ustad Habib Pasha and Begum Mumtaz Khan. He also did research on Ayurveda-based food to see how cooking can improve nutritive value of the food.

Sokhi went on to work as a chef with several restaurants, including: Vintage, a Hyderabadi speciality restaurant, Centaur Hotel, Juhu, Mumbai, Hotel Tuli International, Nagpur (1994–98), The Regent, Mumbai (1998–2001)z The Regent, Jakarta, Taj Lands End, Bandra, Mumbai, and Blue Cilantro in Andheri, Mumbai Sokhi has conducted cooking schools at Regent Jakarta and The Peninsula Manila. He has also organised Indian food festivals internationally. In 2001, he and others founded Khana Khazana India Pvt Ltd. He led food trials, developed ready-to-eat products for the Khazana brand, and conceptualised a range of chocolate mithais (Indian sweets). He has also been involved with the Ching's Secret brand.

Sokhi executed the business class menus on Singapore Airlines for seven years, and also conducted the "Ancient Indian Food" promotion on Indian Airlines. He has also developed menus for SOTC travels. Besides, he has developed menus for Wockhardt Hospitals. Hetaught as a guest faculty member at the N. L. Dalmia Institute of Management Studies and Research. He has also designed menus for many events, including weddings and birthday parties.

== Television ==
In 1993, Sokhi hosted the first episode of Khana Khazana on Zee TV. He launched his first solo show Harpal ki Rasoi on Nagpur's local Siti Cable TV, but the show was not as successful as Sokhi expected it to be. Later, Sokhi started hosting Turban Tadka on Food Food channel, which gained him popular recognition in India. He is famous for his phrase "Namak Shamak" and song he sings while seasoning his food. It became one of the top cookery shows by TRPs. Sokhi came to be known for his phrase namak shamak.

He has also hosted the TV shows Kitchen Khiladi and Sirf Tees Minute on FoodFood channel. In 2014, he hosted Zee News' road food show Desh da Swaad, travelling across India. He is also one of India's top chefs on YouTube. In 2016, he participated in the dance reality show Jhalak Dikhhla Jaa 9.

He is currently the Celebrity Chef Coach on the TV show "Laughter Chefs Unlimited Entertainment" on Colors, where he guides celebrities through comedic culinary challenges along with Bharti Singh where harpal is making food too to help the celebrity participants to cook well

== Other ventures ==
In 1998, Sokhi conceptualised and executed the opening of the Indian specialty restaurant Khazana in Dubai. He also formulatSinghsiness plans and opening plans for other restaurants. In 2012, he launched his own restaurant chain The Funjabi Tadka (TFT). The flagship branch of the restaurant opened on 18 January 2013 in Kolkata.

Karigari is an Indian casual-dining restaurant chain. Chef Harpal Singh Sokhi launched it. The restaurant's name is derived from HIndi language term referring to professional craftsmanship. The business model focuses on regional Indian cuisine, utlizing a menu curated by Sokhi that reflects his past work in various Indian regional cuisines. The brand distinguishes its services by formally recognizing its kitchen staff's culinary expertise.

The restaurant chain Karigari, founded by Sokhi, added Kanji to its menu at specific locations in Delhi, NCR region. This beverage is a fermented drink traditionally consumed in India as a probiotic. The preparation process relies on natural fermentation techniques and the brand specifies that the finished product does not contain preservatives or synthetic additives.

Sokhi has written food columns for newspapers and magazines. He is one of the oldest associates of Sanjeev Kapoor, and has developed content for his books. The two have authored a book Royal Hyderabadi Cooking.

== Personal life ==
Sokhi lives in Mumbai with his wife Aparna. The couple has two daughters: Anushka and Antra. He is fluent in seven languages: English, Hindi, Punjabi, Bengali, Odia, Telugu and Urdu.
