= Bournvita Quiz Contest =

Indian quiz show

The Cadbury Bournvita Quiz Contest is an Indian quiz contest that began on 12 April 1972. Sponsored by Cadbury India, it is one of India's most famous quiz contests. Originally held live in cities across the country, it later became a radio show and then, in June 1992, a television show on Zee TV. Later, the show was shifted to another television channel, Sony Entertainment Television. After a hiatus, it moved in a truncated version to Pogo, before landing its last TV outing in the channel Colors. In 2015, BQC completed its first YouTube-only season with Centre Point Nagpur as All India Champions. It then moved to its app called BQC where the viewers can play along.

== Hosts ==
The show is hosted by Derek O'Brien. The original quiz master on the radio show was Hamid Sayani, a prominent Indian broadcast personality. After the first four years, Hamid died and the show was taken over by his brother Ameen Sayani.

== Requirements ==
According to the show's organizers, they are looking for children with proven talents who have been rewarded by their school. The children who take part must be able to present themselves clearly in Hindi or English. Also, participants should be able to balance their academics with their extracurricular activities. Each team consists of students from a given school.

=== Reward ===
All the participants who reach the national finals (after making it to top 16 of 100 City Winners) are given cash prize each along with a gift hamper from Cadbury.

== History ==
BQC achieved its peak popularity during the 90s in the Zee TV era, and arguably also when it moved to Sony in a similar format. During this period, BQC was considered a gold standard quiz show, where school pride was at stake and the quizzing was dead serious. The show was also frequented by A List celebrities of that era, including legends like Zakir Hussain, Lata Mangeshkar, Sachin Tendulkar among many others. However, after being pulled off air, they tried pandering to a younger audience with Pogo in the later 2000s, which was a critical failure, and went off air within one season. A couple of years later, BQC returned on Colors, with Saumya Tandon acting as a co-host. This version of the show was also populist but neither did it bring in the ratings expected.

=== Youtube version ===
After being cancelled from its fourth channel, BQC returned, but this time on YouTube, where it encourages the audience to play along using its app, or an application built into the YouTube video. The latest avatar of BQC is a mini 12-15 minute version with emphasis on objective type questions, and none of the innovative quizzing patterns established in the 90s. It saw 2 teams going head to head answering 8 questions, each with an equal number of points. The first season in 2015 saw the participation of 16 teams which had qualified the Zonal Finals, with Centre Point Nagpur being crowned All India Champions.
