= The Children's Investment Fund Management =

London-based hedge fund management firm

The Children's Investment Fund Management Limited
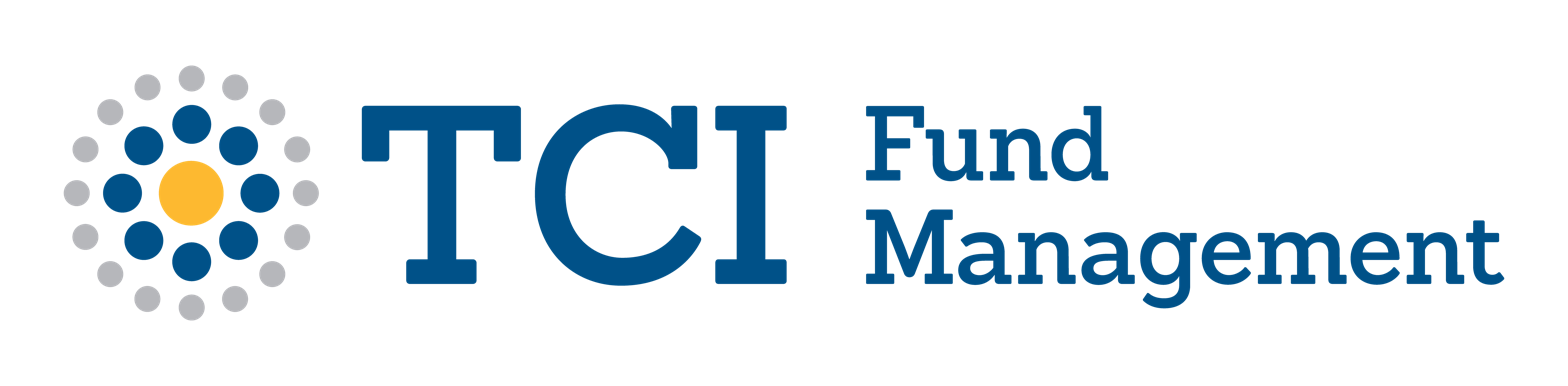

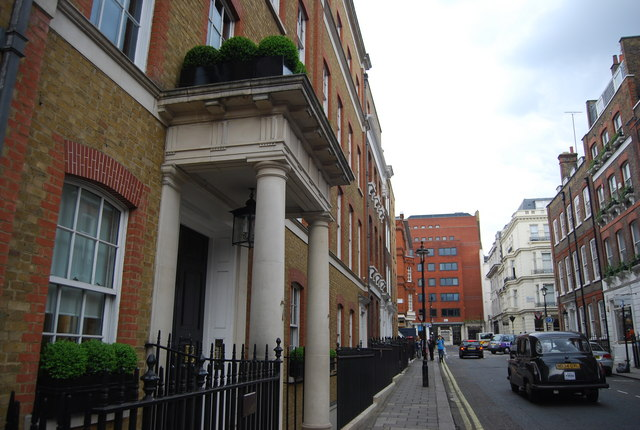
- Headquarters at 7 Clifford Street
- Type: Private
- Industry: Hedge fund
- Founded: 2003; 23 years ago
- Founder: Chris Hohn
- Headquarters: London, United Kingdom
- AUM: US$77 billion (2026)
- Website: tcifund.com

The Children's Investment Fund Management Limited (TCI) is a British hedge fund management firm founded by Chris Hohn in 2003 which manages the Children's Investment Master Fund. TCI makes long‐term investments in companies globally.

It is the second largest United Kingdom based hedge fund and the sixth largest in the World. With $77 billion in assets under management (AUM), TCI has generated nearly $70 billion in net gains for investors since inception.

The management company is authorized and regulated in the United Kingdom by the Financial Conduct Authority. Its holding company is TCI Fund Management Limited, based in the Cayman Islands. TCI derives its name from a charitable foundation called the Children's Investment Fund Foundation (CIFF), set up by Sir Chris Hohn and his ex-wife, Jamie Cooper-Hohn, and initially contributed a proportion of profits to the foundation.

In January 2022, TCI was named by the Guardian as the world's top-performing hedge fund. It is known as one of the most aggressive activist investors.

Like most hedge funds, TCI requires investors to commit their capital for multi-year periods. This long-term horizon allows the fund greater flexibility when trading and investing capital independent of any potential ad hoc time constraints.

== Charity ==
TCI derives its name from the Children's Investment Fund Foundation (CIFF), a charitable foundation set up by Chris Hohn and his ex-wife, Jamie Cooper-Hohn. In an example of "venture philanthropy", CIFF initially received a portion of TCI's profits and other donations. CIFF focuses on improving the lives of children living in poverty in developing countries, and has grown to be one of the largest charities in the United Kingdom. After suffering a 43% loss during the 2008 calendar year, as of July 2009 the previous financial year had seen a rebound of over 70% profit and revenue for TCI.

Through changes set in motion in 2012, the fund and foundation were split up. The fund no longer donates money to the foundation on a contractual basis, though it has done so on a discretionary basis.

== Investor activism ==
TCI has a reputation for aggressive shareholder activism. TCI has been a major shareholder of the German stock exchange Deutsche Börse where it forced the resignation of the CEO after he refused to abandon his plan to take over the London Stock Exchange.

In 2007, after acquiring 1% of the shares of major Dutch bank ABN AMRO, TCI led an attack demanding the bank split up or sell to the highest bidder to produce shareholder value. ABN was ultimately split and sold to Royal Bank of Scotland (RBS), Fortis, and Banco Santander and was a major contributing factor in the downfall of both RBS and Fortis. In June 2007, TCI failed in its attempt to get the Japanese utility J-Power, in which it had acquired a 10% stake, to boost its dividend. The general meeting of shareholders rejected the proposal, prompting a severe selloff in the stock.

In 2006, as a shareholder of both Mittal Steel Company and Arcelor, TCI supported Mittal Steel in the company's unsolicited takeover offer for Arcelor.

TCI initiated legal action against the Government of India using provisions in the bilateral trade treaty between United Kingdom and India regarding the under pricing of coal by Coal India Limited, in which TCI holds a 1% stake.

In 2008 the US railroad company CSX won a court case against the Children's Investment Fund and 3G Capital Partners, another hedge fund, after the funds announced that they had acquired about 20% of CSX's stock. TCI succeeded in electing four of its five directors to the CSX board, but CSX shares declined by about 50 percent after the meeting. TCI declared defeat and sold its shares, taking its directors off the board. Chris Hohn, the founder of TCI vowed to abandon shareholder activism as an investing strategy. When the case was appealed, the judge gave limited support for the original finding.

In 2008 the company was suffering from heavy losses but recovered very well and assets under management reportedly stood around $6 billion. At the end of 2010, the company recorded a loss of 80% in profits as a result of reduced investment performance. By 2020 the hedge fund was managing more than $30 billion. It recorded a 41% gain in 2019 after gaining just 0.9% in 2018.

In November 2022, Chris Hohn on behalf of TCI wrote an open letter to Sundar Pichai, CEO of Alphabet and Google. In the letter, Hohn stated that Google's headcount was too high and should be reduced. He also stated that there should be more effort to reduce losses in its self-driving unit Waymo. On 20 January 2023 Alphabet cut 12,000 jobs which was 6% of its workforce. On the same day, Hohn issued another letter to Pichai stating that there should be further job cuts with a target of 20%.

== Awards ==
The fund won Eurohedge's European Hedge Fund of the Year award in 2004, 2005, and 2013.
