= Yusuf Hussain =

Indian television actor (1948–2021)

- Born: 21 January 1948
- Died: 30 October 2021 (aged 73); Mumbai, Maharashtra, India
- Occupation: Actor
- Years active: 2000–2020
- Children: Safeena Husain
- Relatives: Hansal Mehta (son–in–law)

Yusuf Hussain (21 January 1948 – 30 October 2020) was an Indian television actor known for his work predominantly in Bollywood. Yusuf was also known for his work in Dhoom 2, OMG – Oh My God!, Raees, Dil Chahta Hai and Krrish 3.

Yusuf, a Lucknow native, was a businessman before he decided to enter the film industry, starting with Indian theatre. He married thrice and is the father of Safeena Husain and father in law to Hansal Mehta. He died of COVID-19 at the age of 73.

== Filmography ==
Films

Year	Film	Role
2001	Dil Chahta Hai	Naresh
2002	Raaz	Doctor Who Is Treating Nisha
2002	Ab Ke Baras	
2003	Dum	Police Commissioner
2003	Escape from Taliban	Colonel Banerjee
2003	Nayee Padosan	Mr. Iyengar
2003	Darna Mana Hai	Mr. Khandelwal
2003	Kuch Naa Kaho	Roshanlal Sehgal
2003	Hazaaron Khwaishein Aisi	Senior Politician
2004	Khakee	Police Commissioner
2004	Dhoom	Police Commissioner Tripathi
2005	Apaharan	Tabrez's Advocate
2006	Return To Rajapur	Vikram Singh Rathore
2006	Zoop in India	Dorpshoofd
2006	Vivah	Friendly Appearance
2006	Dhoom 2	Police Commissioner Mr. Tripathi
2007	Loins of Punjab Presents	Mr. Rehman
2007	Khoya Khoya Chand	Zafar's Father
2008	Pranali: The Tradition	Pranali's First Customer
2008	Don Muthu Swami	Mr. Parekh
2008	Saas Bahu Aur Sensex	Mr. Oberoi
2008	Phir Kabhi	
2009	Daddy Cool	Catholic Priest
2009	Blue Oranges	Janakraj Chauhan
2009	Road to Sangam	Gaffar
2009	Fatso!	
2010	Fired	Psychiatrist
2010	Sukhmani: Hope for Life	
2011	Hostel	Dean Sharma
2011	I Am Singh	Mr. Hassan
2012	Rizwan	Dadajaan
2012	Kyaa Super Kool Hain Hum	Catholic Priest
2012	OMG – Oh My God!	Judge
2012	Ata Pata Lapatta	Session Court Judge
2013	Krrish 3	Scientist In Kaal's Laboratory
2013	Shahid	Professor Saxena
2014	The Letters	Archbishop
2015	Crazy Cukkad Family	
2015	Downtown	Mr. Zaidi
2015	Silence The Court Is In Session	Mr. Kashikar
2015	Listener	
2016	Wah Taj	Chief Minister
2017	Khamosh Adaalat Jaari Hai	Mr. Kashikar
2017	PFA: Love Mom & Dad	Father
2017	Scavenger's Daughter	Raghuveer Chaudhary
2017	Raees	Mill Manager
2017	Red Affair	
2018	Nirdosh	
2018	Vishwaroopam II	Mr. Goswami
2018	Jalebi	Old Man In Train
2019	The Tashkent Files	Mr. Bakshi
2019	Albert Pinto Ko Gussa Kyun Aata Hai?	Jeff Pinto
2019	Seven	Maqbool
2019	Dabangg 3	Principal
2020	Darbar	Doctor
2021	Bob Biswas (Posthumous Release)	Bob's Doctor

Television

Year	Serial	Role	Channel
2000	Suraag – The Clue	Jagan Dikshit (Episode 61)	DD National
2001	Ssshhhh...Koi Hai – Khel Khel Mein	College Principal (Episode 13)	Star Plus
2002	Ssshhhh...Koi Hai – Jinnat	Rehmatullah Khan (Episode 46)	Star Plus
2002	Kumkum – Ek Pyara Sa Bandhan	Balwant Rai	Star Plus
2002–2003	Bhabhi	Deenanath Chopra	Star Plus
2003	Kabhie Kabhie – Kabhie Door Kabhie Paas	Sanjana's Father (Episode 12)	Zee TV
2003–2004	Tum Bin Jaaoon Kahaan	Parikshit	Zee TV
