= Safeena Husain =

Indian social worker

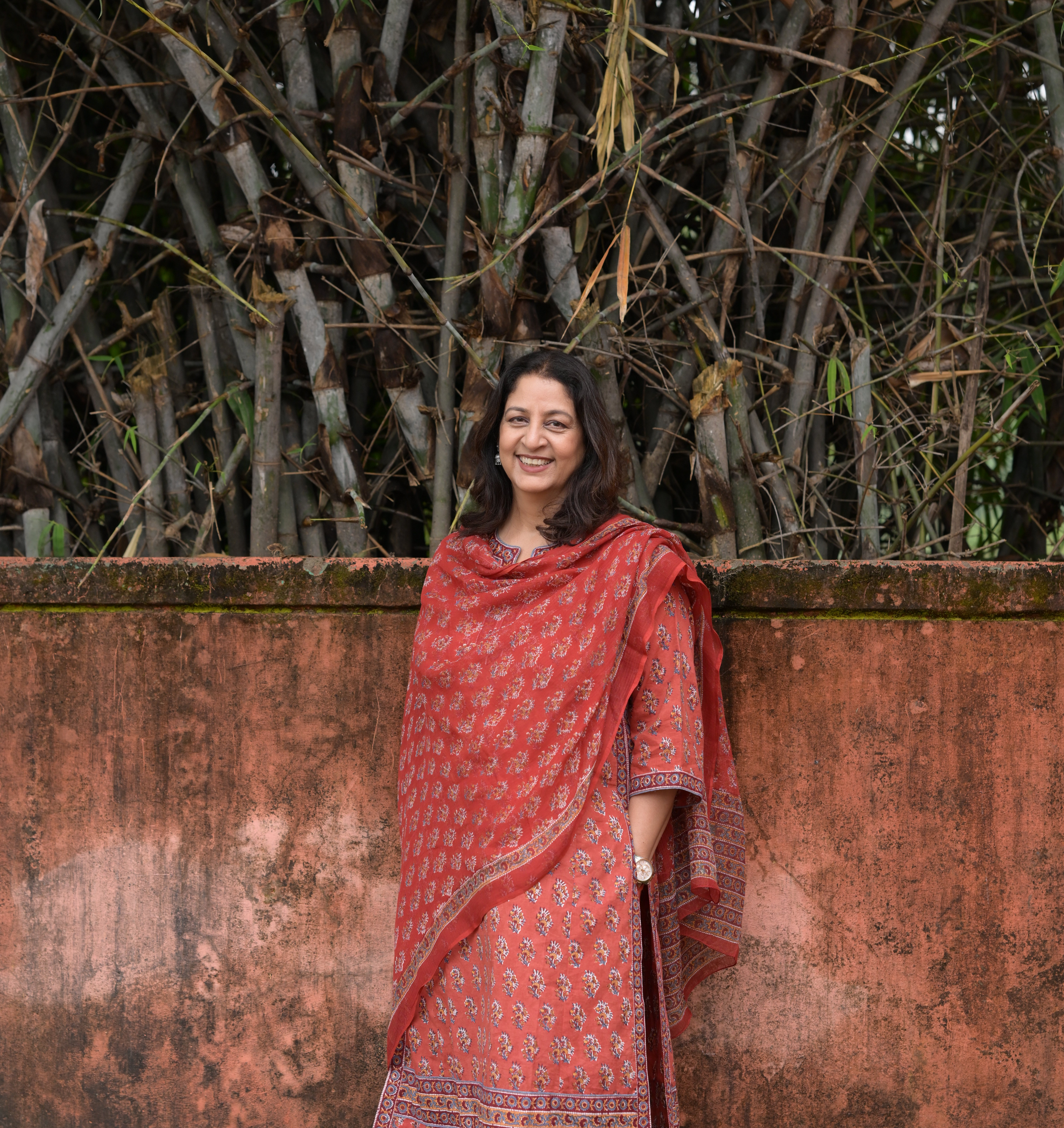
- TIME Women of the Year 2026
- Born: 21 January 1971 (age 55); Delhi, India
- Spouse: Hansal Mehta (m. 2022)
- Children: 2 daughters
- Father: Yusuf Hussain

Safeena Husain is a social entrepreneur and education advocate. She is the founder of Educate Girls, a non-profit organisation that works to improve educational access and learning outcomes for girls in some of India's most educationally underserved regions through community mobilisation, volunteer engagement, and partnerships with government systems.

Safeena has gained international recognition for advancing community-led approaches to girls' education and for pioneering innovative financing models in the social sector. In 2026, she was named to the TIME Women of the Year list, which recognises influential leaders driving change across the world. In 2025, she led Educate Girls to become the first Indian non-profit organisation to receive the Ramon Magsaysay Award, making Educate Girls the first Indian organisation to receive the honour.

In 2024, she was awarded an honorary doctorate by the London School of Economics and Political Science (LSE), and in 2023 became the first Indian woman to receive the WISE Prize for Education, one of the world's leading honours in the field of education.

In January 2026, Safeena published Every Last Girl: A Journey to Educate India's Forgotten Daughters, which was launched at the Jaipur Literature Festival. The book chronicles the founding and growth of Educate Girls and examines the barriers that continue to prevent millions of girls from accessing education, drawing on experiences from rural communities across India.

Under Safeena's leadership, Educate Girls has developed large-scale community-driven models to improve educational participation and learning outcomes. Its volunteer network, Team Balika, comprises more than 55,000 community leaders and has supported the enrolment and retention of over 2.2 million previously out-of-school girls while helping improve learning outcomes for more than 2.5 million children. She also led the implementation of the world's first Development Impact Bond in education and guided Educate Girls to become the first organisation in Asia selected for the TED Audacious Project.

Safeena's work has focused on the intersection of gender equity, education, community participation, and systems change. Through Educate Girls, she has advocated for scalable solutions that seek to address educational exclusion and expand opportunities for girls and young people across India.

== Early life and education ==
=== Education ===
Safeena's education was disrupted after she completed her secondary schooling due to family circumstances. During this period, some family members advocated for an early marriage, while an aunt supported her pursuit of higher education. With that support, she moved to the United Kingdom, where she continued her studies.

In 1995, Safeena graduated from the London School of Economics with a Bachelor of Science degree in Economic History, becoming the first member of her family to earn a university degree abroad. Her experiences navigating educational barriers and gender-based social expectations later informed her commitment to advancing girls' education and gender equity through the founding of Educate Girls.

=== Early life ===
Following her graduation, Safeena worked in the field of international development, focusing on public health, community development, and poverty alleviation. Between 1997 and 2004, she held senior leadership positions, including serving as Executive Director of Child Family Health International, where she oversaw the organisation's international expansion and programme development.

Through her work across Asia, Africa, and Latin America, Safeena engaged with initiatives addressing health, poverty, and social inclusion in underserved communities. These experiences deepened her understanding of the structural barriers that perpetuate inequality and informed her later focus on advancing educational access and gender equity in India.

== Educate Girls ==
After returning to India, Safeena moved to Mumbai in 2005 and began developing the concept that would become Educate Girls, which she formally founded in 2007. She pointed to surveys indicating India was the worst G20 country to be born a woman in as demonstration for India's need for a large scale NGO focused on gender equity in education. There were no such organizations, to her satisfaction, in India at the time. She initially focused on working with the Ministry of Education in partnering with schools in Pali and Jalore which had the worst education gender gaps at the time. Husain subsequently contacted Pratham and UNICEF to learn best practices. She focused on being the strongest presence in a focused community and encouraging community participation. This strategy led to the creation of, Team Balika,a volunteer network that has grown into one of the largest community-based education movements in India. Their goal is to find out of school girls and encourage them to re-enroll. Husain has highlighted Educate Girls effort to work with the education system and improve it rather than working against the system. Educate girls embodied this idea by signing a Memorandum of Understanding with the government to replicate the organizations model at 2,083 schools in Jalore. Motivated by persistent gender disparities in education and women's participation, she sought to establish an organisation capable of addressing educational exclusion at scale through community engagement and partnerships with government systems.

The organisation subsequently expanded beyond Rajasthan to operate across tens of thousands of villages in multiple states. Since its inception, Educate Girls has supported the enrolment and retention of more than two million previously out-of-school girls and has contributed to improved learning outcomes for millions of children through its community-led interventions.

Between 2015 and 2018, Safeena led Educate Girls' participation in the world's first Development Impact Bond in education, an outcomes-based financing initiative designed to improve educational access and learning achievement. An independent evaluation found that the programme exceeded all of its enrolment and learning targets, and it has since been widely cited as a pioneering example of results-based financing in the education sector.

Under Safeena's leadership, Educate Girls has received international recognition for its work and innovation. In 2025, the organisation became the first Indian non-profit to receive the Ramon Magsaysay Award. It has also been supported by The Audacious Project, a global philanthropic initiative that backs ambitious solutions to pressing social challenges, making Educate Girls the first organisation in Asia selected for the programme.

== Publications ==
=== Safeena Husain as an Author ===
On January 15, 2026, Safeena published Every Last Girl: A Journey to Educate India's Forgotten Daughters, at the Jaipur Literature Festival. The book chronicles the founding and growth of Educate Girls, drawing on her experiences working to advance girls' education in some of India's most educationally underserved communities.

Part memoir and part account of social change, the book explores the barriers that prevent millions of girls from accessing education, including poverty, gender discrimination, and social norms. It also examines the role of community participation, volunteerism, and collective action in improving educational opportunities for girls. The book was launched at the Jaipur Literature Festival in January 2026.

== Recognition & Awards ==
She is a Rainer Arnhold Fellow and Times Now "Amazing Indian". Husain featured as a spxeaker at a TEDxASB event on the subject of "Rejuvenating Government Schools in India for Girls' Education". In 2014 and 2023, Husain won the WISE prize. WISE is an award from Qatar for outstanding impact in education. The 2023 award came with $500,000 for Educatate Girls.

=== International Honours ===
- 2026 – TIME Women of the Year
- 2025 – Ramon Magsaysay Award (awarded to Educate Girls under her leadership)
- 2024 – Honorary Doctorate, London School of Economics and Political Science (LSE)
- 2023 – WISE Prize for Education (Qatar Foundation), becoming the first Indian woman to receive the award
- 2015 – Winner Skoll Award for Social Entrepreneurship - April 2015

=== National Honours ===
- 2019 – ET Prime Women Leadership Award 2019
- 2017 – Winner NITI Aayog Women Transforming India Award 2017
- 2016 –Winner NDTV-L’Oréal Paris Women of Worth Award 2016

=== Fellowships and Other Recognition ===
- 2013 – Rainer Arnhold Fellow, Mulago Foundation
- 2014 – Times Now Amazing Indian

== Personal life ==
Safeena is married to Hansal Mehta, an acclaimed filmmaker and screenwriter. The couple married in May 2022 after a long-term relationship and have two daughters, Kimaya Mehta and Rihanna Mehta.
