= Mallika-E-Kitchen =

- Genre: Cookery show
- Presented by: Shruti Seth (Season 1); Saumya Tandon (Season 2,3,4)
- Country of origin: India
- Original language: Hindi
- No. of seasons: 3
- No. of episodes: 48

Production
- Camera setup: Multi-camera
- Running time: Approx. 24 minutes

Original release
- Network: Colors TV, Zee TV
- Release: 12 July 2009 – 30 December 2012

Mallika-E-Kitchen is an Indian cookery television series that premiered on Colors TV on 12 July 2009. The first season of series is hosted by Shruti Seth and is sponsored by LG Corp.

== Format ==
Each episode consists of a cookery competition between two women who prepare the same dish; however, one of them prepares it on the traditional gas stove and other concocts it in a microwave oven in a deadline of 20 minutes. The food concocted is first commented by a chef and then tasted by the celebrity guest, who is supposed to guess whether the dish (s)he liked was made using microwave or stove. The name of the winner is kept anonymous until the guest decides which one was the best. The winner is given the title of "LG Mallia-E-Kitchen" and an LG microwave oven from regional director(s) of LG.

== Overview ==
Season	Host	First Airdate	Last Airdate
Season 1	Shruti Seth	12 July 2009	4 October 2009
Season 2	Saumya Tandon	22 August 2010	5 December 2010
Season 3	Saumya Tandon	25 September 2011	8 January 2012
