= The Children's Investment Fund Foundation =

Global development philanthropic organization to benefit children

The Children's Investment Fund Foundation (UK)
- Founded: 2002
- Founders: Chris Hohn; Jamie Cooper-Hohn
- Type: Private Foundation
- Purpose: Climate Change, Sexual & Reproductive Health Rights, Child Health & Nutrition, Child Protection, Girl Capital
- Region served: Global
- Method: Grants
- Key people: Chris Hohn, Chairman; Chris Hohn, Co-founder; Jamie Cooper-Hohn, Co-founder; Kate Hampton, CEO
- Endowment: £ 5.2 billion, $ 6.65 billion
- Website: www.ciff.org

The Children's Investment Fund Foundation (UK) (CIFF) is an independent philanthropic organisation with offices in Addis Ababa, Beijing, London, Nairobi and New Delhi. It is a registered charity in England and Wales and in 2021 disbursed $468 million and committed $772 million in charitable investments. With assets of GBP £5.2 billion (US$6.6 billion), it is the 5th largest global development philanthropy in the world based on annual disbursements. According to OECD published data, it is the world's second largest private funder of reproductive health and environmental protection globally and the largest philanthropy that focuses specifically on improving children's lives. In 2021, CIFF pledged $500 million towards gender equality over five years as part of the generation equality forum.

CIFF was established in 2002 by Sir Chris Hohn and wife, Jamie Cooper-Hohn as the philanthropic arm of Hohn's hedge fund, the Children's Investment Fund Management (TCI Fund Management), which in 2019, topped the list of the most profitable hedge funds in the world. By utilising a hybrid fund-and-foundation model, Hohn sought to bring a private sector-like approach to philanthropy with intellectual rigour and commercial acumen to attain clear returns for children from the outset. The foundation's approach emphasises a high appetite for risk to invest in bold ideas for transformative and scalable solutions and reliance on high-quality data and evidence. It has pioneered the use of several innovative financing tools and catalytic funding mechanisms within development contexts and has become one of the leaders in venture philanthropy for global development.

Unlike other foundations of similar influence, CIFF is known for avoiding press, though it is most commonly in the news for its climate action, in partnership with co-founder Chris Hohn and TCI Fund management, particularly the Say on Climate campaign which has enlisted global investors to press dozens of companies to set out their plans for dealing with their greenhouse gas emissions and to allow investors to regularly review the strategy.

Jamie Cooper-Hohn managed CIFF until 2013 when Michael Anderson was appointed Chief Executive Officer. The CEO is now Kate Hampton, a key figure behind the creation of the 2016 Paris Agreement.

The Children's Investment Fund Foundations is within the Partner Circle of the Foundations Platform F20, an international network of foundations and philanthropic organizations.

== History ==
In an example of "venture philanthropy" or "philanthrocapitalism", CIFF was set up to automatically receive a portion of profits from TCI fund management. The original formula involved transfers of 0.5 percent of the fund's assets each year, with a further 0.5 per cent of assets for every year during which the fund achieved returns of more than 11 per cent. It is reported that Hohn established the formulaic charitable link in order to motivate himself. Coinciding with the couple's divorce proceedings, changes set in motion in 2012 led to the splitting up of the fund and the foundation. The fund no longer donates money to the foundation on a contractual basis, though it may do so on a discretionary basis.

== Activities ==
CIFF focuses on transforming the lives of poor and vulnerable children living in developing countries. CIFF's investment priorities are childhood and adolescence, child protection, and climate change. Within childhood and adolescence, areas of work include empowering girls and boys to control their sexual and reproductive health and to avoid unwanted pregnancies and HIV/AIDS; improving children and mothers' health and nutrition; preventing low birthweight babies; eliminating deaths from severe acute malnutrition, nested within a more integrated approach to childhood development; and deworming efforts to break transmission for good. In 2019, CIFF in partnership with Wellcome Trust also launched a joint Lancet-Financial Times Commission on Artificial Intelligence in global health expected to be published by end of 2021.

CIFF's child protection work focuses on ending child labour and sexual exploitation by enabling an environment that reduces vulnerability of communities and increases protection of children.

Highlights from CIFF's portfolio in 2018 include:

- CIFF and its co-founder Sir Christopher Hohn agreed to donate US$500 million to climate action over the next five years at the Global Climate Action Summit.
- CIFF partners BRAC and Global Alliance for Improved Nutrition (GAIN) created the largest commercial model for micronutrient powder in the world. Over 145 million sachets of the powder have been sold over the past five years, and an evaluation undertaken in 2018 shows a significant reduction in anaemia among children under five years of age.
- HIV self-testing increased from 500,000 in 2017 to over 5 million in 2018, spurred on by a partnership between CIFF, the Bill & Melinda Gates Foundation, and OraSure, which lowered the price of HIV self-tests to US$2.
- CIFF partner, Bachpan Bachao Andolan's work to facilitate access to justice for children in India led to the launch of prosecution in 9,177 cases of juvenile justice, child labour and commercial sexual exploitation of children.
- CIFF expanded its commitment to deworming, which has so far delivered 1.8 billion treatments for parasitic worm infections in India, Ethiopia and Kenya. In 2016, it performed the world's largest ever public health intervention in a single day, during which the Government of India delivered albendazole to an estimated 270 million children.
- CIFF saw the conclusion of the Implants Access Programme, in which a volume guarantee from CIFF and Gates Foundation halved the price of contraceptive implants from Bayer and Merck – increasing uptake of implants by projected 10 fold from start of the program in 2012 and saving procurers over US$500 million.
- CIFF catalysed a new $275 million coalition (including $175 in aligned capital investments) among 8 philanthropies and 4 governments (Canada, France, Germany, and the United Kingdom) to accelerate energy transition in South East Asia. The partnership helps to promote the right market conditions for the region's private sector to ramp up investments in climate initiatives.

Some of the grants CIFF made in 2014 include:

- $50 million funding to prioritise national deworming programmes through the Uniting to Combat Neglected Tropical Diseases partnership.
- $50 million to increase the number of children receiving life-saving antiretroviral therapy in partnership with the US President's Emergency Plan for AIDS Relief (PEPFAR).
- $20 million pledged in response to the Ebola outbreak in West Africa.
- Launched (along with UBS Optimus Foundation, Educate Girls and Instiglio) the first ever development impact bond.

In 2013, CIFF committed to spend $787 million over 7 years to tackle malnutrition. This was part of a total pledge of $4.1 billion towards reducing malnutrition announced at the Nutrition for Growth summit in London, co-hosted by the United Kingdom, Brazil and CIFF.

In 2012, CIFF was one of the signatories of the London Declaration on Neglected Tropical Diseases, a WHO inspired collaborative disease eradication programme of 10 neglected tropical diseases.

The Clinton Foundation lists CIFF among 7 organisations from which it received more than US$25 million.

According to the OECD, CIFF provided USD 253.4 million for development in 2019, of which 98.9% was provided in the form of grants and 1.1% in the form of non-grants.

CIFF has donated more than £150,000 to the environmental pressure group Extinction Rebellion. As of January 2022, CIFF was the single biggest individual donor to the group.

== See also ==
- Absolute Return for Kids
