= Development impact bond =

Development impact bonds (DIBs) are performance-based investment instruments intended to finance development programmes in low resource countries, which are built off the model of social impact bond (SIB). In general, the model works the same: an investor provides upfront funding to the implementer of a program. An evaluator measures the results of the implementer's program. If these results hit a target set during the implementation period, an outcome payer agrees to provide investors a return on their capital. This ensures that investors are not simply engaging in concessionary lending.

In 2012, as the first domestic SIBs were being arranged in Massachusetts, a group of students at the Harvard Kennedy School, formed Instiglio Inc. as a specialized intermediary to bring impact bonds to foreign aid projects in low and middle-income countries.

In June 2014, Instiglio, Children's Investment Fund Foundation (CIFF), Educate Girls, IDinsight and UBS Optimus Foundation launched the first DIB. The objective of the DIB was to reduce the gender gap in education in rural Rajasthan, India by getting girls into school and learning. UBS provided an investment to an Indian NGO, Educate Girls. After three years, CIFF (the outcome payer) paid based on enrollment and learning outcomes that IDinsight evaluated annually. UBS Optimus Foundation received its investment back plus a return on investment based on the performance of the program. A 2018 review showed that the program resulted in a 52 percent return on investment because of high achievement of the targets. The same study noted that a significant learning was that the high transaction costs can outstrip the cost of the program itself, but that these remain constant regardless of the program size.

In 2014, Palladium International hosted a conference on rapidly expanding the use of DIBs in developing countries. In 2017 Palladium contracted as the intermediary for the Utkrisht Impact Bond supporting maternal and newborn health in Rajasthan, with investment from UBS Optimus and outcome payments from USAID and Merck for Mothers.

The Center for Global Development and Social Finance working group on DIBs convened in 2012 led by Elizabeth Littlefield. The working group published its report including numerous recommendations in 2013.

The first work applying DIBs to neglected tropical diseases was led by H2O Venture Partners, supported by DFID and UBS Optimus, to develop case studies for the control of sleeping sickness and rabies.

A related development, pushed by the International Committee for the Red Cross and other partners, is the Humanitarian Impact Bond, designed for financing aid in conflict-affected areas.

== See also ==
- Bond (finance)
- Build America Bonds
- Eurobond
- GDP-linked bond
- Government bond/Sovereign bonds
- Impact Investing
- Patient capital
- Social impact bond
