= Grandpa Kitchen =

Indian YouTube channel

Narayana Reddy
- Born: 21 August 1946; Mumbai, British India
- Died: 27 October 2019 (aged 72–73); Telangana, India
- Other names: Grandpa Kitchen
- Occupation: Cooking YouTube
- Years active: 1972–2019

Grandpa Kitchen is a YouTube channel established by Narayana Reddy (21 August 1946 – 27 October 2019). He was from Telangana, India. In his channel he and (especially after his death) his grandchildren cooked large dishes of food intended for orphans, making both Indian and western dishes. The creator's residence is near Hyderabad.

Sanya Jain of NDTV described the resulting dishes as "mega-sized", and Reddy used a wood-fired flame to cook instead of a modern oven. Reddy's son operated the YouTube channel itself. Reddy's trademark clothing consisted of a dhoti and a white shirt, and he also has a white handlebar moustache. Anurag Verma of News 18 wrote that two factors that made him popular on YouTube were the donations of food and the "seemingly modest approach to cooking".

== History ==
Reddy cooked large meals for members of his family, who visited from more comprehensive conurbations. He started a YouTube channel later catching from other family branches that his meals could be given to others in the district. Before his YouTube profession, Reddy was a gardener.

His first video, "King Of 2000 EGGS," was uploaded in August 2017. As of 1 November 2019, the channel built a subscriber base of 6.11 million, with Indian and foreign viewers, and included over 220 videos. His first video was viewed on over 2.6 million occasions. His Patreon, as of that day, had over 1,000 people subscribed to it, and his Facebook had about 5,30,000 subscribed to it. As of 1 November 2020 his most widely viewed video, of him making finger chips (a.k.a. potato chips a.k.a. french fries), had 55 million views. A video showing him preparing a batch of Maggi noodles from 100 packets had a total of 27 million views, and his mutton biryani video had over 13 million views. He also made chicken biryani, fried chicken, chicken noodles, chocolate cakes, donuts, gulab jamuns, hamburgers, lasagne, milkshakes, pancakes, vegan pizza, potato wafers, oreo pudding, and red velvet cake. Members of his family chose to work for him to help produce videos instead of their previous employment.

Reddy stopped uploading cooking videos due to health issues; his final before-mentioned video, uploaded on 20 September 2019, denoted "Crispy Potato Fingers". A succeeding video was of him explaining his health predicaments. Preeti Biswas of The Times of India stated he was "visibly diseased" in the aforementioned video. Reddy died on October 27, 2019, at age 73. His family notified the public after his entombment ended, via a YouTube video uploaded three days later on 30 October, lasting about five minutes. Within 24 hours the video had 89,110 views, and by 1 November 2019, this increased to 3.3 million views and 142,192 comments from people around the world. There were also responses on Reddit threads. His nephew Srikanth Reddy stated he and other members of the family have plans to continue Narayana's work by making subsequent videos, the first of which was released on 6 November 2019. Now, they are expanding largely towards foreign-themed foods, starting from Philippine adobo, alongside regular Indian food. The videos are now hosted by Srikanth Reddy alongside at least one other member of the family, depending on the video. Unlike the elder Reddy, who spoke little English and whose dialogue usually consisted of simple descriptions, Srikanth is fluent in English and occasionally gives more detailed information on the ingredients and cooking methods.

As of Oct 7, 2023, Reddy's nephew made a crew member, Srinivas Reddy (who is a relative of Reddy's nephew) the new face of Grandpa Kitchen (essentially Grandpa 2.0), takes over the place of Reddy a little over 3 years after his death. Reddy's nephew, Srikanth, welcomed Srinivas in a live stream and said that the channel was getting fewer and fewer views after Reddy had died. Srinivas was a crew member for 2 years before taking over as the new face of Grandpa Kitchen. More info provided on Grandpa Kitchen's livestream: Grandpa Kitchen is Live 1
