= Educate Girls =

Non-profit organization in India

- Founded: 2007
- Founder: Safeena Husain
- Type: Non-profit
- Purpose: Girls’ Education
- Location: India
- Region served: Rajasthan, Madhya Pradesh, Uttar Pradesh, India
- Method: Partnership with the Government and communities to improve access to primary education for children.
- Key people: Safeena Husain
- Volunteers: 23,000+
- Website: www.educategirls.ngo

Educate Girls is a non-profit organization in India, established in 2007, founded by Safeena Husain, that works towards girls' education in India's rural and educationally backward areas by mobilizing communities.

It currently operates in over 20,000 villages in Rajasthan, Madhya Pradesh, Uttar Pradesh and Bihar. By leveraging the Government's existing investment in schools and by engaging with a huge base of community volunteers, Educate Girls helps to identify, enroll and retain out-of-school girls and to improve foundational skills in literacy and numeracy for all children (both girls and boys). Since its inception in 2007, the organization has reached over 24 million total beneficiaries, and has helped mobilize communities to enroll over 2 million out-of-school girls in school. In 2025, it became the first Indian organization to receive the Ramon Magsaysay Award.

== Executive summary ==
Educate Girls is a nonprofit organization that promotes and supports girls' education in the remotest and rural and educationally backward parts of India. It works in partnership with the Government of India and operates over 20,000 villages of Rajasthan, Madhya Pradesh, Uttar Pradesh and Bihar. It engages with a huge base of community volunteers and in the process helps to identify, enroll, retain out-of-school girls and improve foundational skills in literacy and numeracy for all children. The organization had announced in 2020 its selection in the list of HundrED 2021 Global Collection organized by Internationally renowned Finland-based global education not-for-profit HundrED, which discovers, researches, and shares inspiring innovations in K12 education from around the world. Educate Girls' innovation was reviewed by 150 Academy members consisting of academics, educators, innovators, funders and leaders from over 50 countries.

Educate Girls creates community ownership to help communities to prioritize girls' education. The model includes the following elements:

Safeena Husain was born and brought up in New Delhi and holds a B.S. from the London School of Economics and was always been committed to girls' education in India and abroad and has worked extensively in this area even in the third-world countries of South America, Africa and Asia and had also been elected as one of the Asia 21 Young Leaders by the Asia Society.

=== Facilitating community ownership through team Balika ===
Educate Girls has over 23,000 Team Balika (community volunteers) who work as champions for girls' education in their respective villages. Team Balika members work with Government schools as well as village communities to spread awareness on girl child education. Team Balika are trained in community mobilization and outreach (door-to-door surveys, enrolment activities, conducting community meetings), learning curriculum (GKP) implementation, leadership and motivation. They are mostly between the ages of 18 and 30 and are often among the most educated members of their communities. Each Team Balika is given continuous training and hand-holding by Educate Girls throughout the year to facilitate their efforts.

=== Increasing girls' enrolment ===
After using existing Government data and door-to-door surveys (conducted by Educate Girls) to identify out-of-school girls in the area, responsibility is then distributed between the village leaders, elders, school administration, Team Balika and Educate Girls' staff to bring girls back to school. This often involves going door-to-door to convince parents to send their girls to school and rallying the community through Gram Shiksha Sabha's and Mohalla Meetings.

=== Supporting school administration ===
At village meetings a 15-member council is elected to form the School Management Committee (SMC). This consists of parents, teachers and village leaders and is responsible for school governance and administration. Educate Girls handholds the committee members and provides them with support to prepare and execute School Improvement Plans (SIPs) and conduct school assessments.

=== Improving learning outcomes ===
Educate Girls trains its Team Balika (community volunteers) to implement a remedial learning curriculum, with the use of specially designed kits, called Gyan ka Pitara (GKP). The learning tools focus on building micro-competencies in English, Hindi and Math for children in Grades 3, 4 and 5. The GKP accounts for the needs of marginalised children and uses interactive tools, activities and games, and worksheets for individual children in the classroom, ensuring that no child is left behind. Tests are conducted before and after curriculum implementation to assess learning levels.

=== Creation of girl leaders ===
Educate Girls facilitates the election of Bal Sabhas (Girls' Councils) in every upper primary school. This 13-member council gives girls a leadership position within the school and training in life skills to boost communication, leadership and problem solving skills.

== History ==
A small local team, led by Safeena Husain, conducted the initial test project in 50 schools of Pali district in Rajasthan. This 50-school project was launched under the umbrella of the Rajasthan Education Initiative (REI). The initiative started with 500 schools in 2008 to over 4,425 schools in 2013, with an aim to promote girls' education in rural Rajasthan and Safeena designed a sustainable model where the whole community works hand in hand to enroll girls into government schools and the initiative became successful due to community involvement.

After successful completion of the test phase, the organization was independently registered in 2007 and won government approval to start a pilot project in 500 schools in 2008, working with 70,000 children in the Bali, Sumerpur and Rani blocks of Pali district with the cooperation and support extended by partners like UNICEF, Pratham Rajasthan, SERVE and Dream Catchers Foundation.

In 2017, the organisation working to provide the social impact of the Development Impact Bond (DIB), received £238,000 in capital from the UBS Optimus Foundation in order to deliver its objectives. The Educate Girls Development Impact Bond is a performance-based structure where The service provider (Educate Girls) delivers social impact to a targeted population, the investor (UBS Optimus) who provides the upfront working capital required for the implementation of the project and the outcome payer (The Children's Investment Trust) pays the investor on the success of the project against an agreed impact evaluation metrics.

== Area of work ==
With community mobilization and sustainability as the guiding parameters, the NGO aims to:

- Enhance enrollment and retention of girls through individual tracking, community mobilization and quality improvement.
- Reduce gender disparity in schools and project areas, and improve the level of life skills and competency of the girl.
- Ensure increased participation of children, families and communities in plans and actions for holistic education.

== Impact ==
- Over 2 million girls brought back to school.
- 90% girls' retention.
- 150,000 active girl leaders.
- Over 23,000 active Team Balika volunteers.
- Over 24 million total beneficiaries.
- Launched world's first DIB (Development Impact Bond) in the education sector with UBS Optimus Foundation and CIFF which on its completion in 2018, surpassed both its target outcomes.

Since 2007, Educate Girl had enrolled over 750,000 girls in schools and learning outcomes for over 1.3 million children. They are known for the world's first Development Impact Bond and becoming the first Audacious Project in Asia.

== Recognition ==
Educate Girls has received the following awards:

- Dasra Village Capital award in 2010.
- 3rd EdelGive Social Social Innovation Honors 2011.
- The World Bank's India Development Marketplace award in 2011.
- Millennium Alliance Award, 2014.
- WISE Award for innovation in Education, 2014.
- Stars Impact Award 2014.
- India's Most Ethical Companies Award 2015.
- Skoll Award for Social Entrepreneurship 2015 – to Safeena Husain.
- Nasscom Foundation Social Innovation Award 2016.
- NDTV-L'Oréal Paris Women of Worth Award 2016 – to Safeena Husain.
- ET Prime Women Leadership Award 2019 – to Safeena Husain.
- Ramon Magsaysay Award in 2025.

== See also ==
- Camfed, a similar nonprofit
