= Manju Malhi =

British chef

- Culinary career
- Cooking style: Brit Indi & Indian cuisine
- Television show(s): Saturday Cooks – ITV1 Saturday Kitchen – BBC One Blue Peter – BBC One Taste – Sky One Great Food Live – UKTV Food Food Uncut – UKTV Food Urban Icons – BBC Three Open House – Five This Morning – ITV1 Breakfast News – BBC One Terry and Gaby Show – Five

Manju Malhi (born c. 1972) is a British-born chef and food writer, specialising in Anglo-Indian cuisine. She was brought up in North West London where she grew up surrounded by Indian culture, traditions and lifestyles. However, she spent several years of her childhood in India where she explored and experienced the vast and varied cuisines of the country. Malhi has come up with her own self-styled "Brit-Indi" style of food, which mixes Indian and Western influences.

Malhi came to prominence in 1999 when she won a competition to find a guest chef for the BBC's Food and Drink programme and cooked with Antony Worrall Thompson on the show. She was later invited back for a second appearance.

Malhi's Simply Indian series was aired on the Taste Network in early 2001, and this was followed by her debut book Brit Spice, published in 2002 by Penguin Books. She has also made guest appearances on several other programmes, on ITV's This Morning, Channel Five's Open House and The Terry and Gaby Show, Sky One, UKTV Food’s Great Food Live and the BBC's Saturday Kitchen.

In 2004 Malhi published a second book, titled India with Passion, which covers regional Indian home cuisine, and a third, Easy Indian Cookbook, was released in April 2008. As of 2007, she was working on a 40-part series on British food for Indian broadcaster NDTV.

Malhi writes about Indian food for newspapers and magazines, and has provided voice overs for BBC News 24, BBC World and the BBC Asian Network. She has worked as a live continuity announcer for BBC Two television. She has also worked with the VSO charity to promote their annual Big Curry Night campaign.
