= Raji Jallepalli =

Indian-American chef

- Born: Rajeswari Rampalli; May 1949; Hyderabad, India
- Died: January 27, 2002 (age 52); Memphis, Tennessee, US
- Occupations: Chef, restaurant owner
- Years active: 1989–2002

Rajeswari "Raji" Jallepalli (May 1949 – January 27, 2002) was an Indian-born chef and restaurateur based in Memphis, Tennessee. She is credited by The New York Times with "originating the fusion of classic French and Indian cuisines".

== Early life ==
Rajeswari Rampalli was born in May 1949 in Hyderabad. Because of her father's work as a high-ranking diplomat for the state of Andhra Pradesh, her family traveled often to Europe. She married Panduranga Jallepalli, a physician, and moved with him to the United States in 1969. Raji had trained as a microbiologist and transitioned to working in laboratory work as a medical technologist in the U.S. They initially lived in New York and New Jersey, and moved to Memphis, Tennessee, in the early 1970s. In Memphis, she was a stay-at-home mother for her two sons with occasional work assisting in her husband's medical practice.

== Career as a chef ==
Jallepalli opened her first restaurant, The East India Company, in Memphis in 1989. Although the initial menu reflected a curry house, she later transformed the menu as a fusion of French and Indian cuisine; she renamed it Restaurant Raji in 1992. The new menu was well received and Jallepalli was invited to cook at the James Beard House six times in the 1990s. She was nominated for two James Beard Foundation Awards, in the Best Chef: Southeast category, in 1996 and 1997. She was honored by the White House in millennial celebrations in 2000 as part of a program called "Imagine the Future".

Jallepalli's cookbook, Raji Cuisine: Indian Flavors, French Passion, was published by HarperCollins in 2000 and featured Indian-French fusion recipes designed by Jallepalli. The same year, she was chosen by Avtar Walia to be the executive chef of Tamarind, a fine-dining Indian restaurant in Tribeca, New York City. Tamarind opened in January 2001 and was called "a clear-cut victory for the cause of Indian food" in an early review by The New York Times food critic William Grimes.

== Personal life ==
Jallepalli's first marriage to Panduranga Jallepalli, with whom she had two sons Prasad and Satish, ended in divorce; she later remarried to Louis Reiss in 1999. She died in Memphis on January 27, 2002, aged 52, from gastric cancer. Her family included parents Radha and Ramakrishna along with three younger sisters Padma, Sita and Vaijayanthi.
