= Ambi Swamy =

Indian chef

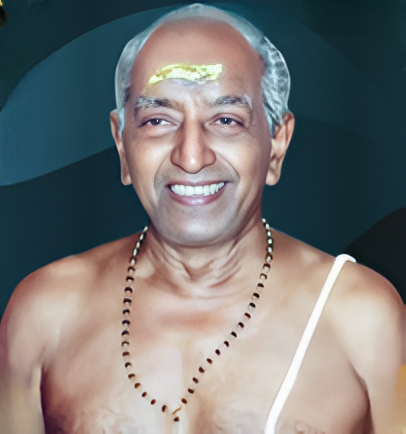
- Born: M.S. Krishna Iyer c. 1934; Kerala, India
- Died: 2012 (aged 77–78); Thirissur, Kerala
- Occupations: Chef, Restaurateur
- Culinary career
- Cooking style: Vegetarian Dishes
- Current restaurant
- Ambi Swamy’s
- Website: ambiswami.com

M.S. Krishna Iyer (c. 1934 - 2012), also known as Ambi Swamy, was an Indian chef and a restaurateur.

== Early life & family ==
Swamy was born in Thrissur, Kerala, India. He started his cooking at the age of 17 and has organised cooking for big programmes like Kerala School Kalolsavam. He was instrumental in bringing vegetarian dishes to masses in Kerala from the temples. He has prepared sadya for various functions of prominent people,including wedding sadya of former Chief Minister of Kerala K. Karunakaran.

Swami is survived by his wife Narayani Ammal, sons Sangameshran, Suresh Ambi Swami alias Seshadri, Hariharan, Rajkumar (Prakash), Anil, Sunil, Venugopal, and daughters Parvathy and Ambili. swamy died in 2012 at Thrissur.
