= Chris Hohn =

British hedge fund manager (born 1966)

Sir Chris Hohn KCMG
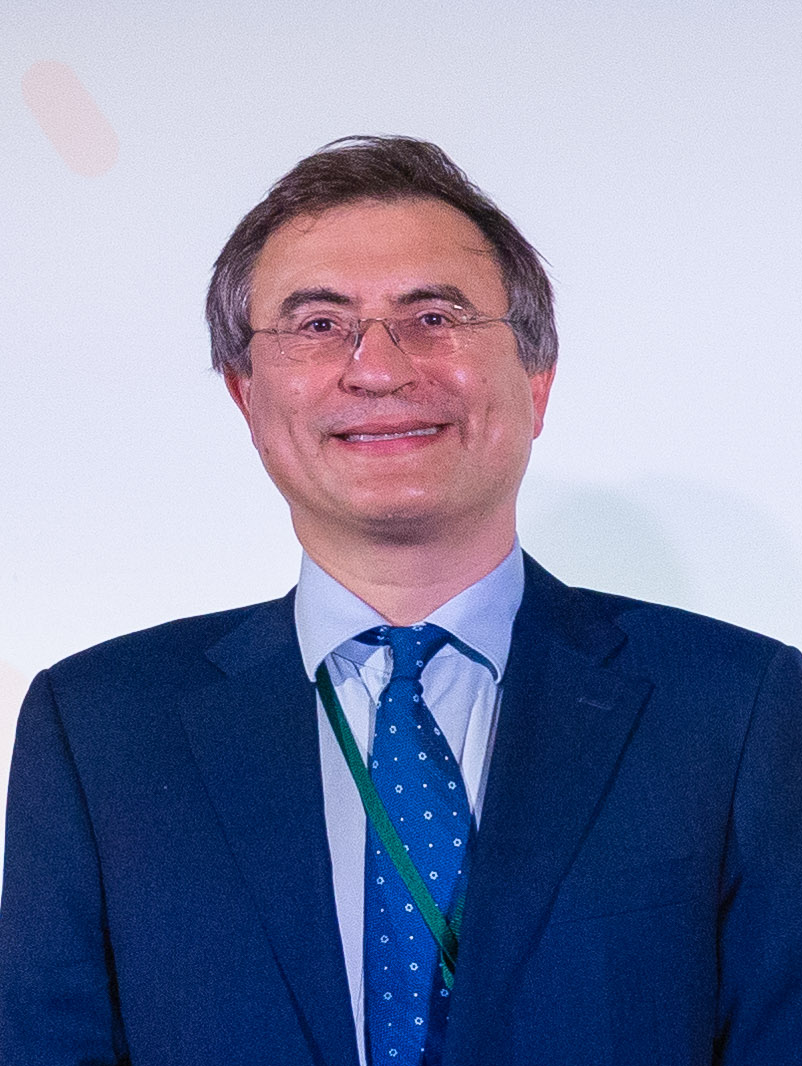
- Hohn in 2023
- Born: Christopher Anthony Hohn; October 1966 (age 59–60); Addlestone, Surrey, UK
- Education: University of Southampton; Harvard Business School
- Occupation: Hedge fund manager
- Known for: Founder and CEO, The Children's Investment Fund Management Founder and Chair, The Children's Investment Fund Foundation
- Spouses: Jamie Cooper (m. 1995, divorced) Kylie Richardson (m. 2022)
- Children: 4

Sir Christopher Anthony Hohn KCMG (born October 1966) is a British billionaire hedge fund manager. As of 2026, he is worth $14.1 billion.

In 2003, Hohn established The Children's Investment Fund Management (TCI), a value-based hedge fund, and the second largest British hedge fund. Profits generated by the fund were initially proportionately allocated to The Children's Investment Fund Foundation, a registered charity in England and Wales.

He is known as an activist investor, and is an outspoken advocate of urgent action on climate change.

== Early life ==
Christopher Anthony Hohn was born in October 1966 in Addlestone, Surrey, United Kingdom. His father Paul was a Jamaican-born car mechanic of European descent who moved to Britain in 1960, and his mother was a legal secretary from East Sussex.

He was a pupil at St Paul's County Secondary School in Addlestone between 1979 and 1983, gaining 13 O Levels. He then attended the University of Southampton, and graduated in 1988 with first-class honours in accounting and business economics. He briefly worked for Coopers & Lybrand to help cover his impending student loan repayments. While at Southampton, a tutor advised him to apply for Harvard Business School, where he completed the Master of Business Administration course. He graduated in 1993 as a Baker Scholar, meaning he was among the top five percent of graduates.

== Career ==
After graduating, Hohn started working for the private equity group Apax Partners in 1994. In 1996, he went to work for Perry Capital, a hedge fund on Wall Street. In 1998, he was made head of their London operations.

In 2003, Hohn set up his own hedge fund, The Children's Investment Fund. TCI donated regularly to a connected charitable fund, The Children's Investment Fund Foundation, run by his then-wife, Jamie. The original formula involved transfers of 0.5 percent of the fund's assets each year, with a further 0.5 per cent of assets for every year during which the fund achieved returns of more than 11 per cent. It is reported that Hohn established the formulaic charitable link in order to motivate himself. Coinciding with the couple's divorce proceedings, changes set in motion in 2012 led to the splitting up of the fund and the foundation. The fund no longer donates money to the foundation on a contractual basis, though it may do so on a discretionary basis.

In 2019, it was reported that he had built a €730m stake in Heathrow Airport via a range of investment companies jointly taking a 4% stake in Spanish multinational Ferrovial.

In conjunction with TCI, Hohn launched the "Say on climate" initiative. The idea of the campaign is to make companies disclose their greenhouse gas emissions and their plans to manage these emissions and also give shareholders an advisory vote on the plans and their results. The initiative was first implemented by Aena, Unilever, Glencore, and CN but it has won many critics at the same time.

=== Investor activism ===
In November 2022, Hohn, on behalf of TCI, wrote an open letter to Sundar Pichai, CEO of Alphabet and Google. In the letter, Hohn stated that Google's headcount was too high and should be reduced. He also stated that there should be more effort to reduce losses in its self-driving unit, Waymo. On January 20, 2023, Alphabet cut 12,000 jobs which was 6% of its workforce. On the same day, Hohn issued another letter to Pichai stating that there should be further job cuts with a target of 20%. The letter also states that management should address excessive employee compensation.

=== Remuneration ===
Hohn took £200m in dividend payments in 2018, slightly more than his Children's Investment (TCI) fund made in profit. This was down from $274m in 2017 and $364m in 2016. His 2015 earnings of $250 million ranked him 12th among the 25 top earning hedge fund managers.

From March 2019 to March 2020 he paid himself $479 million, the highest annual amount paid to a person in the UK.

In December 2023, Hohn received a £275 million dividend from TCI Fund Management.

== Donations ==
As of 2019, Hohn's lifetime giving was listed at $4.5 billion by Forbes.

In 2019 it was reported by The Daily Telegraph that Hohn had donated £50,000 to environmental activist group Extinction Rebellion, with a further £150,000 donated by the Children's Investment Fund Foundation. None of the charity's money was spent on civil disobedience, it was claimed. Hohn is the single largest individual funder of Extinction Rebellion, a group that organises high-profile climate protests around the world, and whose U.S. affiliate has called for "rebellion against the U.S. government for its criminal inaction on the ecological crisis."

In April 2020, he made a £2.4 million donation to purchase around 100 SAMBA II machines to test for COVID-19.

In April 2025, in response to the Trump administration's cutoff of USAID funds, Hohn donated to MANA Nutrition, a company in Georgia, to enable continued production of peanut butter paste for malnourished children.

After a 2025 watchdog report indicated that between 2014 and 2023, Hohn had sent $553 million to U.S. political and environmental advocacy organisations, Hohn's foundation announced that it would stop giving money to U.S.-based groups, citing uncertainty about the U.S. policy environment governing foreign funding. Hohn has also been a major donor to the Arabella Advisors network via the New Venture Fund and Windward Fund.

== Personal life ==
In October 1995, he married Jamie Cooper, a fellow Harvard graduate student from Chicago, whom he had met at a party during his studies. Upon marriage, they took each other's surnames to become Cooper-Hohn, although he was still widely known as Hohn. The couple went on to have four children, including triplets. In 2013, it was reported that Hohn had begun divorce proceedings with his wife. In November 2014, he was set to pay his American-born ex-wife $500 million, in what was thought to be the biggest divorce settlement ever awarded by an English court. In December 2014, he was ordered to pay his ex-wife £337 million. His second wife is Kylie Hohn (née Richardson), who has a PhD from Harvard University and has taught at Harvard and the University of Cambridge. She is the CEO of LightEn.

Hohn was appointed Knight Commander of the Order of St Michael and St George (KCMG) in the 2014 Birthday Honours for services to philanthropy and international development.

Hohn practises yoga and does not eat meat.
