= Saransh Goila =

Indian chef (born 1987)

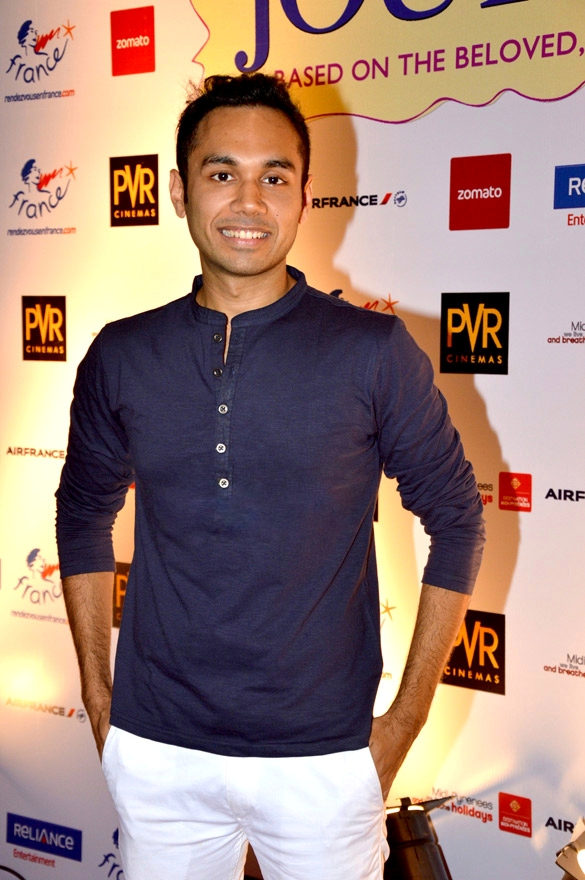
- Chef Saransh Goila
- Born: February 17, 1987 (age 39); Delhi, India
- Education: Institute of Hotel Management - Aurangabad (The Taj Group of Hotels)
- Culinary career
- Cooking style: Indian cuisine
- Television show: Roti Rasta aur India

Saransh Goila (born February 17, 1987) is an Indian chef of Sindhi and Punjabi descent and a winner of the Food Food Maha Challenge. He is the author of the food travelogue 'India on my Platter'. In 2018 he was invited to be a guest judge from India on Masterchef Australia where contestants had to cook his version of Butter Chicken. In 2013 he participated in the show, Sanjeev Kapoor Ke Kitchen Khiladi, which went on air on 16 September 2013 on Sony India. He is the host of the TV Show Roti Rasta aur India and Healthy Fridge on Food Food channel. He is based in Mumbai. In 2016 Saransh started his restaurant Goila Butter Chicken.

== Awards and recognitions ==
In 2014 he entered Limca Book of Records for the "Longest road journey by a chef".

Saransh won a spot on Food Food Maha Challenge which was hosted by Sanjeev Kapoor and Madhuri Dixit. He was one of the 16 contestants on the show who were battling to win the coveted title of India Ka Super Chef. He emerged as the winner.

== Media appearances ==
In 2018, Saransh hosted the web series 'Run to Eat'. It is a food travelogue in which the chef travels to different parts of the world to run and explore local cuisine. He featured as a judge on Masterchef Australia season 10.

In 2014, Saransh hosted the web series The Spice Traveller on his YouTube channel. It is a food travelogue in which the chef travels to Great Britain.

In 2012, he hosted the TV show Roti Rasta aur India on Food Food channel. It is an Indian food travelogue show in which the chef travels 20,000 km of India by road in 100 days The culinary journey is about the rural villages of India, meeting the local families, learning about their cuisine, and creating meals on the go.
