= Manjunath Mural =

Indian chef

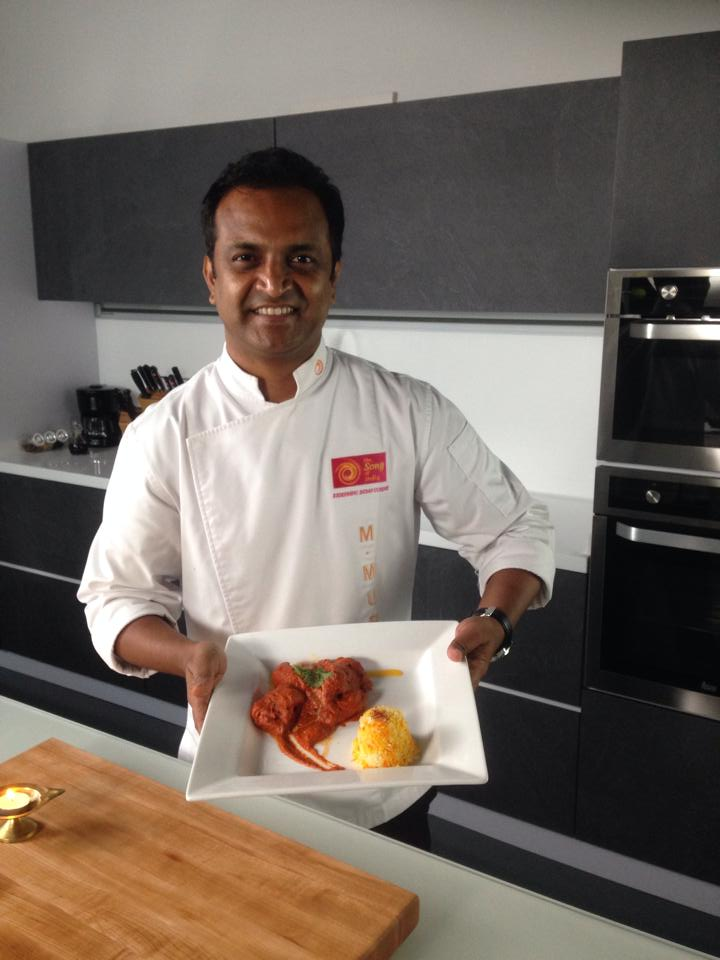
This is a photo of Manjunath Mural after preparing a dish in the kitchen at Song of India in 2014.

Manjunath Mural (born 10 May 1973) is the executive chef of The Song of India restaurant in Singapore. His specialty is modern Indian cuisine. His cooking has won him several awards.

== Family background ==
Born on 10 May 1973, Manjunath Mural, son of Parashuram Mural, was brought up in Mumbai, India. His father, younger brother and sister are all doctors. His mother died of cancer when he was young.

== Education ==
In 1993, Mural decided that rather than work in medicine, he would prefer a life in the hospitality industry. He studied hotel management and food production at IHMCTAN in Bangalore, India, with the aim of becoming a room service manager. His interest in cooking began in 1996 during a 6-month training course at the Taj President, a 5-star hotel at Cuffe Parade in Mumbai India. Working in different kitchens, his interest grew and he decided that he would like to be a chef. He went back to IHMCTAN for a final year and won 2nd place in a cooking competition. He was then selected to represent the college in a national cooking competition.

== Career ==
Mural returned to Mumbai after his studies due to his mother's death. His desire to become a chef led him to join The Resort, a five star hotel at Madh Island in Mumbai. While working he continued to put in effort for better opportunities and was later selected as management trainee in kitchen at Centaur Hotel at Juhu Beach in Mumbai. While completing his management programme he had the opportunity to work with renowned master chef Sanjeev Kapor and celebrity chef Milind Sovani. Later he was appointed as chef de partie and he continued to specialise in Indian cuisine, working in main kitchen and banquets. He was then given opportunity to be in charge of the northern Indian speciality restaurant called Pakhtoon and ran the restaurant kitchen operation.

He assisted and contributed to the five star recipe book Sanjeev Kapoor's Khana Khazana: Celebration of Indian Cookery. Later also he worked in Sahara Amby valley before joining five star hotel- The Retreat at Madh Island as sous chef.

He later worked at Marriott Renaissance at Powai, Mumbai as junior sous chef.

On 19 February 2006, Mural arrived in Singapore and joined as sous chef to start up The Song of India under Milind Sovani where he contributed to building the reputation of The Song of India as one of the renowned famous Indian restaurants in Singapore. Mural led the team from The Song of India to win the bronze medal 2006 in a chefs competition held by the Restaurant association of Singapore.

In 2007, he won the gold medal in gourmet hunt Singapore 2007 for The Song of India.

In 2009, Channel News Asia ran a reality TV show as a chefs competition and Mural won 2nd place which gave him media recognition.

In 2011, Mural was promoted to corporate chef of The Song of India group. Apart from managing the operations for The Song of India, he put in extra effort and created a new brand for The Song of India Group, Indian Express, to share his love for food to the mass market. He was nominated for World Gourmet Awards, KitchenAid Chef of the Year 2011 and USA Poultry & Egg Export Council Asian Cuisine Chef of the Year.

In 2012, Mural participated in World Gourmet Summit and also has nominations as best Asian chef of the year, chef of the year, World Gourmet Awards, The Miele Guide's The 2nd Annual Chef of Chefs Award and awarded People's Choice award for best Asian chef. In June, he was awarded chef of the month from Cuisine & Wine magazine. Mural was also a participant in the Asian Masters Masterchef Workshop.

During the visit of chef Vikas Khanna ( Michelin star chef from Junoon New York ) to Singapore in May 2012, Mural invited him to work together in The Song of India as part of World Gourmet Summit. They co-hosted two events ″A Week Long Promotion of Epicurean Delights″ and ″Culinary Sensations at The Song of India: Up Close & Personal with Vikas Khanna″.

In March 2013, Mural was once again invited by Channel News Asia for an interview and cooking demonstration. In the same month, he also took part March Home 2013's cooking demo. In April, Mural has been invited to participate in World Gourmet Summit 2013 and Savour 2013. Mural was invited to Asian Masters organised by OCBC in November 2013.

In May 2014, Buzzoop, an Indian news blog, listed Mural as 11 in their list of Top 15 chefs India 2013.

In 2015, Chef Mural was invited as guest chef for SAVOUR held in Shanghai, a gastronomic, regional pop-up event. He was amongst several other Michelin star chefs like Alvin Leung of Bo Innovation (Hong Kong), Laurent Peugeot of Le Charlemagne (France), as well as progressive international stars such as Mads Refslund (co-founder of Noma in Copenhagen and consulting chef for ACME New York).

In 2016, Chef Mural earned a Michelin star as Executive Chef for Song of India. It is the first time an Indian restaurant in South East Asia has been awarded a Michelin star.

In 2017, he once again led his team at The Song of India to garner a Michelin star - still the only Indian restaurant in Southeast Asia to have the honour.

In 2018, he led The Song of India to score a hat trick as the restaurant was awarded a Michelin star for the third consecutive year in a row.
