= Instituto Promundo =

Brazil-based non-governmental organization

Promundo
- Founded: 1997
- Type: NGO
- Purpose: Gender Equity, Masculinities and Femininities, Violence Prevention, Gender-Based Violence, Violence against Youth, Violence Against Children
- Location: Brasília, Brazil
- Key people: Miguel Fontes (Executive Director)
- Website: promundo.org.br

Promundo is a Brazil-based, non-governmental organization with offices in Brasília, Brazil, that work in collaboration to promote caring, non-violent and equitable masculinities and gender relations in Brazil and internationally. Promundo's work engages women, girls, boys and men; strives to transform gender norms and power relations within key institutions; and is based on building local and international partnerships. It is an applied research institute that works to test, evaluate and advocate for policies and programs that transform masculinities.

== History ==
Founded in 1997, Promundo was born out of frustration with the prevailing discourses about gender equality and efforts to put those discourses into action, practice and policy. The institute has concentrated on developing evaluated interventions and advocacy strategies to achieve gender equality with a focus on engaging men and boys in changing inequitable and violent forms of masculinities.

Promundo works locally, nationally, and internationally to:

- Conduct research to build the knowledge base on masculinities and gender equality;
- Develop, evaluate and scale up gender transformative interventions and policies;
- Carry out national and international advocacy to achieve gender equality and social justice.

Promundo designs, implements, and evaluates its research and evidence-based programs in close partnership with local, not-for-profit Civil Society Organizations. In recent years, Promundo has been increasingly recognized for promoting the role of men and boys in achieving gender equality.

== Main programs and activities ==
=== Program H ===
In 1999 Promundo, together with ECOS Comunicação em Sexualidade (São Paulo, Brazil), Instituto Papai (Recife, Brazil), and Salud y Género (Mexico), with support from the Pan American Health Organization (PAHO), the World Health Organization (WHO), International Planned Parenthood Federation/Western Hemisphere Region (IPPF/WHR), JohnSnowBrasil and Durex – SSL International developed the Program H (H for Portuguese: Homens and Spanish: Hombres, the words for Men).

=== Program M ===
In 1999 Promundo in partnership with Ecos (São Paulo), Instituto Papai (Recife), Salud y Género (Mexico) and World Education (United States), with the support of the Oak Foundation, the MacArthur Foundation, the Nike Foundation and the Brazilian Secretariat for Women's Policies developed Program M (M for Portuguese: Mulheres and Spanish: Mujeres, the words for Women).

Program M seeks to promote the health and empowerment of young women through critical reflections about gender, rights and health. It consists of educational workshops, community campaigns and innovative evaluation instruments for assessing the program's impact on young women's gender-related attitudes and perceived self-efficacy in interpersonal relationships.
