= Shazia Khan =

Indian chef

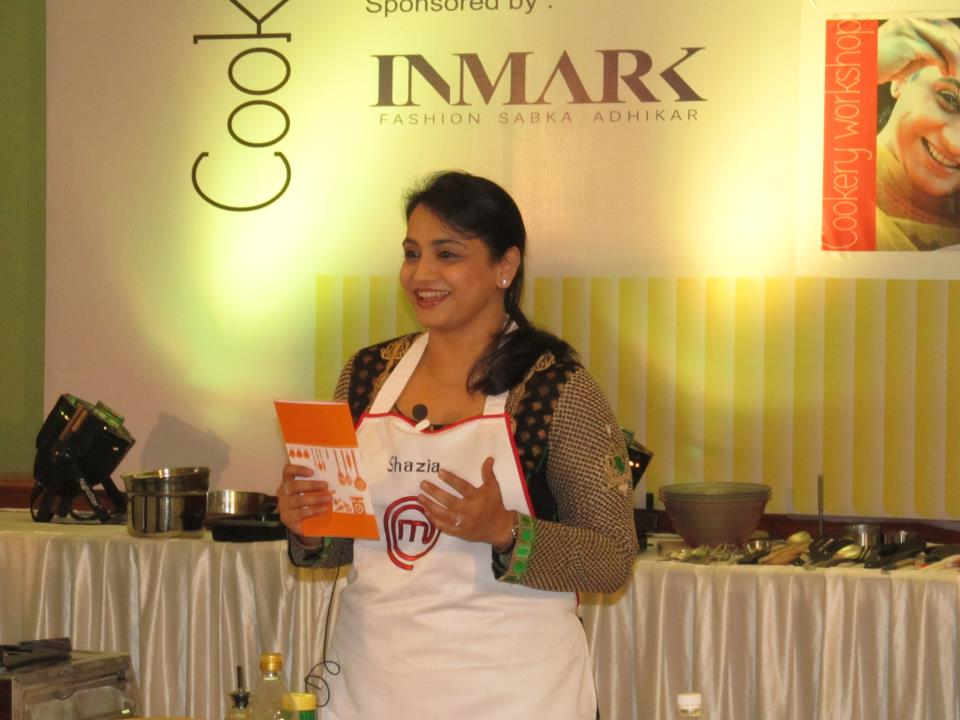
- Occupations: Chef; businesswoman
- Culinary career
- Cooking style: Indian
- Television show: MasterChef India (season 2)

Shazia Khan is an Indian chef. She participated in MasterChef India (season 2), a cookery show hosted by StarPlus in India. She became the first runner-up of MasterChef India Season 2.

She is a member of the board of management at Delhi Public School Bangalore North and Mysore. They run many educational institutes in Bangalore and Shazia involves herself in the education business. She is the daughter-in-law of the former Union Minister K Rahman Khan.

She has conducted cookery shows around the world, a television host, cookbook author "what's on the Menu, founder of The Cooking Studio, The Studio Cafe, Goa and Chennai.

== Articles ==
- Article on Chef Shazia-
- Chef shazia khan smiling to glory-
- Chef Shazia in Varlifoodfestival-
- Article in Deccan Herald
- Article in Navdindtimes
- Article
