= SOTC Travel =

Indian travel agency

SOTC
- Industry: Travel, Tourism
- Founded: 1949
- Headquarters: Mumbai, India
- Key people: Mr. Vishal Suri (Managing Director)
- Products: Holiday Packages, Flights, Hotels
- Services: Travel agencies
- Website: sotc.in

SOTC Travel Limited, formerly SOTC Travel Private Ltd as well as Kuoni Travel (India) Pvt. Ltd. and Sind Oriental Travel Company, is a step-down subsidiary of Fairfax Financial Holdings Group; held through two companies, its Indian listed subsidiary, Thomas Cook (India) Limited (TCIL) and TCIL's subsidiary Travel Corporation (India) Ltd. Established in 1949, it is a travel and tourism company active across travel segments like Leisure Travel, Business Travel, Destination Management Services and Distribution Visa Marketing Services.

== Offerings ==
SOTC offers customized holidays around the world. It also offers Corporate Tours and provides packages for MICE (Meetings, Incentives, Conferences and Events) related travel needs. SOTC Trade Fair Tours aims to accommodate the needs of businessmen visiting or presenting in International trade fairs. It claims to have pioneered the concept of designing and promoting escorted tours to international travelers in India.

SOTC has created different avenues through tour packages namely ‘Bhraman Mandal’ committed to the Marathi speaking population and ‘Gurjar Vishwadarshan’ for the Gujarati speaking population. SOTC has recently launched religious tour called 'Darshans' aimed at offering integrated spiritual and leisure experience across the popular religious destinations in India.

== Key Milestones ==
- 1996 - Kuoni Group enters India by acquiring a 51% stake in SOTC
- 1999 - Kuoni Group acquires 100% equity in SOTC
- 2000 - Kuoni India acquires Sita World Travel
- 2013 - Launched TVC with new brand architecture 'Kuoni Together with SOTC'
- 2015 - Kuoni Travel (India) Pvt Ltd becomes a step-down of Fairfax Financial Holdings Group
- 2016 - Kuoni India rebranded to SOTC as part of brand transition post change in control
- 2016 - SOTC releases new TVC & brand logo

== Awards and Recognitions ==
- Pacific Asia Travel Association Gold Awards 2016 for Consumer Travel Brochure.
- CNBC Awaaz Travel awards 2011 for ‘Most Preferred Tour Operator for Outbound Travel’ to Kuoni & SOTC India.
- Today's Traveller Awards 2017 for "Best Outbound Tour Operator".
