= WION =

Indian multinational news channel

- Logo used since 2016
- Type: Radio, broadcast news, discussions
- Country: India
- Broadcast area: Worldwide
- Network: Zee Media Corporation
- Headquarters: Noida, India

Programming
- Language: English
- Picture format: 1080p HDTV

Ownership
- Owner: Essel Group

History
- Launched: 15 August 2016; 10 years ago

Links
- Webcast: Watch Live
- Website: wionews.com

Availability

Terrestrial
- Sky UK (United Kingdom): LCN 523
- Freeview (United Kingdom): LCN 287
- Etisalat (United Arab Emirates): LCN 550
- BEAM TV (Philippines): Channel 31.6 (planned)
- Cignal TV (Philippines): Channel 178 (planned)
- TrueVisions (Thailand): Channel 782 (planned)

Streaming media
- Live Streaming (International): Web stream at WION
- Live Streaming (India): Web stream at ZEE5
- Live streaming (India): Web stream at Airtel Xtream

WION (/ˈwi.ɑːn/, WEE-ahn; World is One News) is an Indian English language news channel headquartered in Noida, India. WION is owned by the Essel Group and is a part of the Zee Media network of channels, whose majority owner is Subhash Chandra and family. As of 2021, WION had presence in over 190 countries.

== History ==
Zee Media hired Rohit Gandhi as the founder and first editor-in-chief to establish the channel in August 2015. Its simulcast was launched on its website in many countries as a free-to-air satellite service on 15 June 2016. The television channel began airing on 15 August 2016. The channel was made available on Google Assistant in 2020. Sudhir Chaudhary served as its editor-in-chief after Gandhi until he left in 2021. Before switching to CNN-News18, Palki Sharma Upadhyay served for 4 years and resigned in September 2022. Past team includes Naveen Kapoor and Kartikeya Sharma.

In 2021, the appointment of M.J. Akbar, an Indian journalist and politician who has been accused of sexual assault by women, to WION as an "editorial consultant" was met with controversy, with more than 150 journalists signing a statement demanding that Akbar be removed by WION and Zee News.

It has faced criticism from some countries like China and Canada over its coverage, and in 2022 was blocked from YouTube for a period of time for broadcasting a speech by Sergey Lavrov, the head of Russia's Ministry of Foreign Affairs. The channel's former Pakistan bureau chief was forced into exile after a failed kidnapping attempt in Islamabad. The channel has been accused of promoting misinformation regarding COVID-19.

== Staff ==
The current team includes Sidhant Sibal of DD News, who joined the media corporation on 1 April 2018. Madhu Soman joined as a chief business officer in 2022 but left in 2024. Rohit Banerjee looks after the branded content. While Molly Gambhir replaces Palki Sharma's position on Gravitas and Gravitas Plus to become the leading anchor of the WION channel, other associated journalists include Digvijay Singh Deo, Shivan Chanana, Rabin Sharma, Ieshan Wani, Esha Hanspal, Priyanka Sharma and Alyson le Grange.

The channel's Pakistan bureau chief, Taha Siddiqui, was forced into exile after a failed kidnapping attempt in Islamabad. He was replaced by Anas Mallick. Anas Mallick resigned in July 2025.

== Content and responses ==
=== Conflicts with China ===
In 2020, the Chinese Embassy in India lodged a formal protest against WION for its interview with Joseph Wu, head of Taiwan's foreign relations. The embassy criticized WION for promoting what it called "Taiwan Democratic Progressive Party (DPP) separatist activities", claiming it contradicted India's adherence to the One-China policy. The embassy stated that Taiwan is an inalienable part of China, as they claimed was recognized by UN resolutions, and urged WION to respect India's official position. It warned that any challenge to China's territorial integrity regarding Taiwan would be strongly opposed.

In the same year, the Chinese government blocked access to the WION website, as confirmed by GreatFire.org, a Chinese internet monitoring watchdog. Earlier WION has faced criticism from the Chinese government for a coverage on what it described as a "cover-up" of COVID-19 pandemic situation in China. In March, Chinese Foreign Ministry spokesperson Zhao Lijian blocked WION on Twitter. Chinese diplomats in India also critiqued its reporting. In June, the Global Times, linked to the Chinese Communist Party, named WION in an article, advising it to think "independently".

=== Ban in Nepal ===
In July 2020, cable operators in Nepal ceased broadcasting several Indian news channels, including WION, in response to airing of a video that was deemed to be disrespectful to K. P. Sharma Oli, the prime minister of Nepal and a leader of Nepal Communist Party. After a month, some cable operators decided to lift the ban following public backlash from Nepali viewers.

=== 2022 YouTube block ===
On 22 March 2022, WION was blocked from YouTube for "violating YouTube's community guidelines". YouTube had taken objection to a video posted on 10 March, broadcasting a speech by Sergey Lavrov, the head of Russia's Ministry of Foreign Affairs, denying the Russian invasion of Ukraine. YouTube unblocked the channel on 26 March after a social media campaign by WION.

=== Alleged interference in Canadian issues ===
WION was cited in a September 2024 report from RRM Canada on "Potential Foreign Information Manipulation, and Interference following PM Statement on Killing of Hardeep Singh Nijjar". The report examined content from popular Indian state-aligned media outlets and influencers, including WION, finding that "Modi-aligned outlets amplified several state-supported narratives about Prime Minister Trudeau, "Canada's High Commissioner to India, Canada's national security agencies, Canada's Punjabi Sikh diaspora, and Hardeep Singh Nijjar's political beliefs." The report also noted the “massive digital footprint” of some of these media outlets in comparison to Canadian media outlets, and the likely reach they had to global and Canadian audiences.

== Litigation ==
After former anchor Palki Sharma Upadhyay announced her retirement from WION and the creation of a new talk show in CNN News18, WION filed a lawsuit against Upadhyay, saying that "confidential and proprietary Zee information" was taken by Upadhyay, and demanded that Upadhyay should continue to work for WION until December 2022 and pay for damages worth ₹2 crores. However, the Delhi High Court refused WION's appeal, and the next hearing of the case was delayed until March 2023.
