= Amit Goenka =

Indian entrepreneur

- Born: India
- Education: Master of Business Administration
- Occupations: Businessman and entrepreneur
- Organization: Zee Entertainment Enterprises
- Parents: Subhash Chandra (father); Sushila Devi (mother)

Amit Goenka is an Indian businessman and entrepreneur. He is the Chief Executive of the International Broadcast Business of Zee Entertainment Enterprises, and head of Z5 Global.

== Biography ==
Goenka was born to Indian media Baron Subhash Chandra. Goenka finished his MBA studies in the year 2000. Goenka went up to several investors to find investment for his technology related projects. His first venture in technology was Cyquator Technologies Ltd - a company which specialised at the web hosting and e-solutions, He later gained work experiences at Playwin (an online lottery firm) and Zee Learn (an education based project).

In 2014 after the succession of the Zee Corporate Business he became the head of Zee Entertainment's International Broadcast Business and the Essel Group's Infrastructure Head. He subsequently led the group into Power, Water and Gas distribution business under the label of "Essel Utilities".

== Awards ==
In April 2016, he and his brother Punit Goenka became the first Indians to receive the award "Médailles d’Honneur" at Cannes, France.
