= Fabulous Lives of Bollywood Wives =

- Genre: Reality television
- Starring: Neelam Kothari; Maheep Kapoor; Bhavna Pandey; Seema Khan
- No. of seasons: 3
- No. of episodes: 24

Production
- Camera setup: Multi-camera
- Running time: 32–44 minutes
- Production company: Dharmatic Entertainment

Original release
- Network: Netflix
- Release: 27 November 2020 – present

Fabulous Lives vs Bollywood Wives (formerly Fabulous Lives of Bollywood Wives) is an Indian reality television series. The show focuses on the personal and professional lives of Neelam Kothari, Maheep Kapoor, Bhavna Pandey and Seema Kiran Sajdeh (formerly known as Seema Khan), wives of Bollywood actors Samir Soni, Sanjay Kapoor, Chunky Pandey and Sohail Khan (divorced) respectively. The series debuted on 27 November 2020 on Netflix. A second season premiered on 2 September 2022.

The third season which was renamed Fabulous Lives vs Bollywood Wives was released on 18 October 2024, where it also focuses on the lives of Riddhima Kapoor Sahni, Shalini Passi, and Kalyani Saha Chawla who joins the original cast.

== Production ==
The idea of creating a reality series similar on the lines of Real Housewives, originated in 2018.

== Cast ==
=== Main ===
Cast member	Seasons		
Cast member	1	2	3
Neelam Kothari	Main	Main	Main
Maheep Kapoor	Main	Main	Main
Bhavna Pandey	Main	Main	Main
Seema Kiran Sajdeh	Main	Main	Main
Riddhima Kapoor Sahni			Main
Shalini Passi			Main
Kalyani Saha Chawla			Main

=== Recurring ===
Cast member	Seasons		
Cast member	1	2	3
Samir Soni (Neelam's husband)	Recurring	Recurring	Recurring
Sanjay Kapoor (Maheep's husband)	Recurring	Recurring	Recurring
Chunky Panday (Bhavna's husband)	Recurring	Recurring	Recurring
Sohail Khan (Seema's ex-husband)	Recurring		
Shanaya Kapoor (Maheep's daughter)	Recurring	Recurring	Recurring
Ananya Panday (Bhavna's daughter)	Recurring	Recurring	Recurring
Nirvaan Khan (Seema's son)	Guest	Recurring	Recurring
Neetu Singh (Riddhima's mother)			Recurring
Bharat Sahni (Riddhima's husband)			Recurring
Samara Sahni (Riddhima's daughter)			Recurring
Sanjay Passi (Shalini's husband)			Recurring

=== Guest ===
- Malaika Arora (season 1–2)
- Karan Johar (season 1–3)
- Arjun Kapoor (season 1–2)
- Janhvi Kapoor (season 1)
- Mozez Singh (season 1–3)
- Gauri Khan (season 1–3)
- Jacqueline Fernandez (season 1)
- Sidharth Malhotra (season 1)
- Amrita Arora (season 1)
- Ekta Kapoor (season 1,3)
- Raveena Tandon (season 1)
- Neha Dhupia (season 1)
- Angad Bedi (season 1)
- Sussanne Khan (season 1–3)
- Boney Kapoor (season 1)
- Natasha Poonawalla (season 1)
- Tusshar Kapoor (season 1)
- Manish Malhotra (season 1–2)
- Shah Rukh Khan (season 1)
- Neena Gupta (season 2)
- Shweta Bachchan Nanda (season 2)
- Pragya Kapoor (season 2)
- Mehr Jesia (season 2)
- Badshah (season 2)
- Zoya Akhtar (season 2)
- Sima Taparia (season 2)
- Bobby Deol (season 2)
- Vikram Phadnis (season 2)
- Deanne Pandey (season 2)
- Farah Khan (season 2)
- Jackie Shroff (season 2)
- Ranveer Singh (season 2)
- Ranbir Kapoor (season 3)
- Rina Dhaka (season 3)
- Rohit Gandhi (season 3)
- Rahul Khanna (season 3)
- Bharti Kher (season 3)
- Subodh Gupta (season 3)
- Khushi Kapoor (season 3)
- Surily Goel (season 3)
- Saif Ali Khan (season 3)

== Episodes ==
Season	Episodes	Originally released
1	8	November 27, 2020
2	8	September 2, 2022
3	8	October 18, 2024

=== Season 1 (2020) ===
No. overall	No. in season	Title	Original release date
1	1	"Of Waltzes and Water Bras"	November 27, 2020
2	2	"Werk it!"	November 27, 2020
3	3	"Crabs, Claws and a Catfight"	November 27, 2020
4	4	"Feelings and Fillers"	November 27, 2020
5	5	"Fasten Your Seat Belt"	November 27, 2020
6	6	"“Aap Qatar mein hain…”"	November 27, 2020
7	7	"There's Something About Neelam"	November 27, 2020
8	8	"The Shah Rukh-Gauri Big Bash!"	November 27, 2020

=== Season 2 (2022) ===
No. overall	No. in season	Title	Original release date
9	1	"Love, Life and Menopause"	September 2, 2022
10	2	"Bollywood Friends Forever"	September 2, 2022
11	3	"Heard it on the Grapevine!"	September 2, 2022
12	4	"Men are from Mars..."	September 2, 2022
13	5	"Friends, Family and Other Animals"	September 2, 2022
14	6	"Wild Things"	September 2, 2022
15	7	"Face Lifts & FacePalms"	September 2, 2022
16	8	"Objects of Desire are Closer Than They Appear"	September 2, 2022

=== Season 3 (2024) ===
No. overall	No. in season	Title	Original release date
17	1	"The Delhi Cats"	October 18, 2024
18	2	"Fasting & Furious"	October 18, 2024
19	3	"BYOB - Bring Your Own Baggage"	October 18, 2024
20	4	"Let The Chaos Begin"	October 18, 2024
21	5	"Wine & Whine"	October 18, 2024
22	6	"Drunk Skunks"	October 18, 2024
23	7	"Home Hits Different"	October 18, 2024
24	8	"A Tale Of Two Cities"	October 18, 2024

== Reception ==
The series received overwhelmingly negative reviews. Debasree Purkayastha from The Hindu stated, "Maheep Kapoor, Neelam Kothari, Seema Khan and Bhavana Pandey star in this half-baked reality show that doesn't have enough drama or wit to hold your attention". Devki Nehra from Firstpost wrote, "Fabulous Lives fulfils the voyeuristic drive of watching people unlike us in action, but is bereft of the drama that we have come to associate with reality TV".

Jyoti Knayal from India Today added, "The Fabulous Lives of Bollywood Wives is the latest cringe fest from Netflix. You will hate it, but you will probably still watch it". Saibal Chatterjee from NDTV shared his review stating, "Fabulous Lives Of Bollywood Wives Review: It does not offer any meaningful glimpses into lives of the stars and their families in an exacting, unforgiving movie industry where those with the right surnames are like cats."

== Awards and nomination ==
Year	Award	Category	Recipient	Result	Ref
2021	Filmfare OTT Awards	Best Non – Fiction Original (Series)	Fabulous Lives of Bollywood Wives	Nominated	
2023	Pinkvilla Screen and Style Icons Awards	Glam Squad of the Year	Neelam Kothari, Bhavna Pandey, Maheep Kapoor, Seema Sajdeh	Won	
2024	Indian Telly Streaming Awards	Best Reality OTT Show	Fabulous Lives of Bollywood Wives	Won	
