= Siti Networks =

Indian cable TV provider

Siti Networks Limited
- Formerly: Wire and Wireless (India) Limited (1994–2012); SITI Cable Network Limited (2012–2016)
- Type: Public
- Traded as: BSE: 532795; NSE: SITICABLE
- Industry: Media & Entertainment
- Founded: 1 June 1994
- Headquarters: Noida, Uttar Pradesh, India
- Area served: India
- Key people: Subhash Chandra (chairman)
- Products: Digital cable television Broadband internet Local cable TV channels
- Website: sitinetworks.com

Siti Networks Limited, formerly known as Wire and Wireless (India) Limited (WWIL) and Siti Cable Network, is a multi system operator (MSO) promoted by the Essel Group (a 6.1% stake holder). The company provides digital cable television services in India and is headquartered in Noida, Uttar Pradesh.

== History ==
WWIL was formed as a part of the de-merger of Zee Entertainment Enterprises Limited – ZEEL, formerly known as Zee Telefilms Limited (ZTL) – the publicly listed flagship company of Zee Group. As per the Scheme of Arrangement approved by the High Court in Mumbai, all the cable TV distribution business within ZEEL and Siti Cable Networks Limited (Siti Cable) was transferred to WWIL as of 31 March 2006. Siti Cable was a 100% subsidiary of Zee Telefilms Limited. The cable operations of Siti Cable were launched in June 1994. SITI Cable was known as Wire and Wireless (India) Limited till 5 September 2012 wherein after it is renamed as SITI Cable Network Limited. In 2016, it was renamed as Siti Networks Limited.

== Finance ==
In the FY 2023–24, the company reported a revenue from operations of ₹866 crore, while it had revenue from operations of ₹918 crore in FY 2022–23. It reported a loss of ₹204.5 crore in FY24, and it had a loss of ₹314.5 crore in FY23. Siti Networks has been under insolvency proceedings since February 2023, after IndusInd Bank filed a petition over an alleged default of ₹148 crore.

== See also ==
Hathway

Den Networks
