= Intrex Trade Exchange Ltd =

Indian company

- Type: Stock Exchange
- Location: Mumbai, India
- Founded: 2000
- Owner: Essel Group
- Key people: Naveen Surya (CEO & MD)
- Currency: Indian rupee (₹)
- Website: www.intrexindia.com

Intrex Trade Exchange Ltd is an India cash trade exchange company based in Mumbai, Maharashtra. It was formerly known as Intrex India Ltd and was incorporated in 2000 by the Essel Group. The company operates cash and cashless exchange platforms that support finance, marketing, and sourcing activities for businesses in India.
