= Punit Goenka =

Managing director and CEO of Zee Entertainment Enterprises

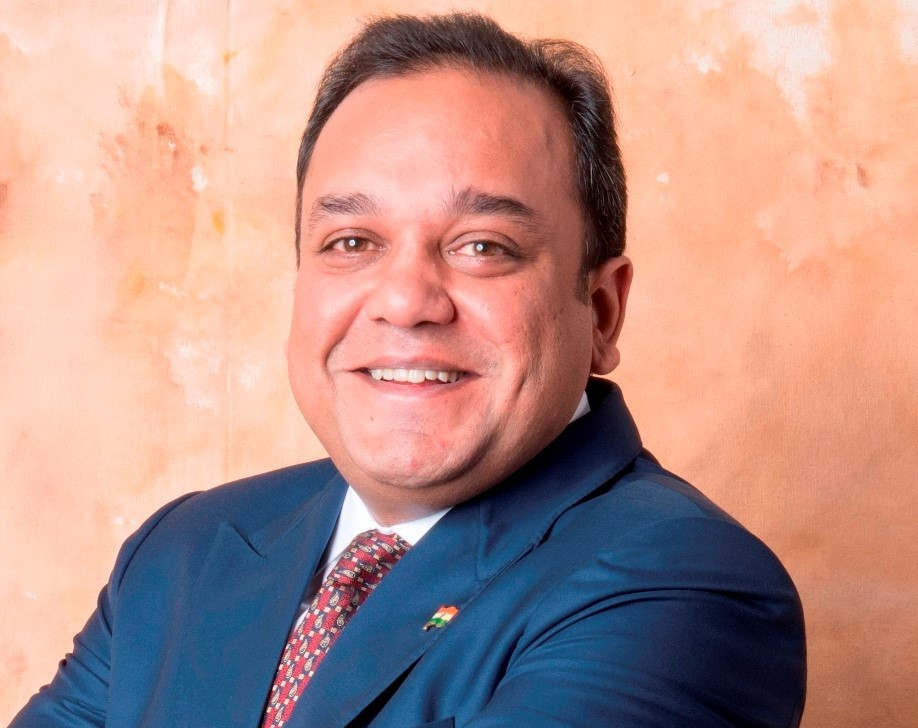
- Goenka in 2016
- Born: India
- Education: B.Com, University of Mumbai
- Occupation: Chief executive & Managing Director of Zee Entertainment Enterprises
- Organization: Zee Entertainment Enterprises (ZEEL)
- Spouse: Shreyasi
- Parents: Subhash Chandra (father); Sushila Devi (mother)
- Relatives: Amit Goenka (Brother)

Punit Goenka is the managing director and chief executive officer of Zee Entertainment Enterprises. Goenka is the elder son of Essel Group chairman Subhash Chandra. Goenka grew up and studied in several towns and cities in India, before moving to Institut Le Rosey, a boarding school in Rolle, Switzerland. He was elected as the President of Indian Broadcasting Foundation (IBF) in September 2016 for a period of one year. He holds a bachelor's degree, B.Com from University of Mumbai 1995.

Training initially within Essel Group, Goenka's first assignment, in 1993, was selling amusement park packages for Essel World to schools in Virar, Mumbai. He was assistant to the head of Essel Packaging, the floor supervisor of a factory, and executive assistant to his father for six months. He then joined Zee Music Company. He was put in charge of organizing funding for Agrani—a programme to launch the group's own satellite. He helped launch Dish TV, working with his uncle, Jawahar Goel, for a year in Delhi. He then moved back to Mumbai and ran Zee Sports. In 2005, he was appointed business head of Zee TV where he ran the content for the entire network. In 2008, he took over as CEO from Pradeep Guha.

Goenka is married to Shreyasi, an art patron and co-director of the Saat Saath Arts Foundation and they have two sons and a daughter.

== Family ==
Punit Goenka's parents are Subhash Chandra and Sushila Devi. His brother is Amit Goenka.

== Legal issues ==
On 12 June 2023, the Securities and Exchange Board of India (SEBI) barred Punit Goenka, along with Subhash Chandra, from holding the directorial positions in any listed company. This action has been taken in response to allegations of siphoning off the funds for their personal benefits from their listed entities, as stated in SEBI's interim order.

== Awards and recognition ==
Goenka was awarded the Business Today ‘Best CEO Award’ in the Media and Entertainment category for 2016. He has also received MIPTV's Médaille d'Honneur Award 2016, Economic Times ‘40 Under Forty’ India's Hottest Business Leaders Award 2014, the ‘Young CEO Award’ by CEO India magazine in 2015 and the IAA Leadership Award 2014 under the category of ‘Media Person of the Year Award’. Goenka has also been recognized as the ‘Entrepreneur of the Year’ during the Asia Pacific Entrepreneurship Awards 2014. Punit was felicitated as the ‘IMPACT Person of the Year’ in 2014.
