= Simply Local =

Community social networking and neighborhood broadcasting service

- Formerly: Gadfly
- Industry: Community Social Networking
- Founded: 2017
- Founder: Nikhil Bapna
- Headquarters: India
- Area served: South Asia and other parts
- Website: www.simplylocal.app

Simply Local is a decentralized community social networking and neighborhood broadcasting service developed by Simply Local, based in New Delhi.

Simply Local creates private geo-fenced networks for people living in an area and provides social and community related services within that network. The user doesn’t post to a single person but broadcasts to a chosen community. One of its primary purposes is also to connect citizens to their elected representatives. Each community is independent of the other and information shared remains telescoped to that particular community. The app has been designed to maintain privacy and security of users and provides decentralized social networking in the sense that it forms an owner-independent, micro community, which is not connected with the world outside.

Simply Local is available on Android Play and iOS App Store. It is available in two languages - English and Hindi. Simply Local’s founder and CEO is Nikhil Bapna.

== History ==
2020 May: Included as a Top 5 Useful App by Zee News.

2020: Used to connect candidates with local residents during the Delhi assembly elections.

2019: Renamed from Gadfly to its current name.

2018: Used for Karnataka State Elections to get detailed information on candidates.

2017: Launched under the name Gadfly as a tool to connect citizens with their elected representatives.
