= Cyrus Bagwadia =

Indian businessman

Cyrus Bagwadia (born 24 January 1947) is an Indian businessman. He was a senior executive at Dupont India, and was the CEO of Essel Propack, an international lamitube producer.

== Education ==
Bagwadia completed his secondary education at St. Xaviers Boys Academy, and attained an undergraduate degree in Polymer Engineering. Later, he obtained his master's degree in Business Management.

== Career ==
Bagwadia started his career as a management trainee in 1968, with Voltas. In 1983, he left Voltas to start the Far East Division of Dupont in India. In 1989, he moved to Hong Kong, heading Dupont's regional office. When DuPont set up new Polymers plants in Singapore in 1992, Cyrus relocated to Singapore as Business Director Asia Pacific. In 1995, he left DuPont to join Essel Packaging Ltd. an Indian packaging company as its president and CEO, and was made the managing director in October, the same year.

Under Bagwadia's leadership Essel Packaging Ltd. expanded its manufacturing and sales, producing over 1 billion tubes annually. He oversaw setting plants in China in 1997 and an acquisition in Germany.

He oversaw the merger of Essel Packaging with Swiss-based Propack AG, which led to operations in South America, South East Asia and Europe. The newly formed Essel Propack had a global market share of over 30%. A first truly Indian Global company with such market share.

In 2002, he organized the setting up of a 60,000 sq. ft manufacturing facility in Danville, Virginia, for the manufacture of toothpaste tubes to supply P&G in North America, at a cost of 15 Million US Dollars.

Following his stint at Essel Propack, Bagwadia moved to Bilcare Research in 2004, where he served as a Director. He set a manufacturing operation in Singapore. He led an acquisition of a clinical research firm in USA.

In 2009, Bagwadia ran an Entrepreneurship Development program in association with the World Zarathushthi Chamber of Commerce, guiding startups and entrepreneurs on building and sustaining businesses. He still mentors start up companies, on board and an advisor in companies in Mumbai and Pune.
