= Essel Propack =

Indian multinational packaging company pvt ltd

EPL
- Type: Public
- Traded as: NSE: EPL; BSE: 500135
- Industry: Tube Packaging
- Founded: 1982 in Mumbai
- Founder: Subhash Chandra
- Headquarters: Mumbai, Maharashtra, India
- Area served: Worldwide
- Key people: Hemant Bakshi (MD & CEO)
- Revenue: ▲₹2,773 crore (US$300 million) (2019)
- Owner: The Blackstone Group (52%)
- Number of employees: 2700+ (2014)
- Website: www.eplglobal.com

EPL Limited (formerly Essel Propack Limited) is a global tube-packaging company owned by The Blackstone Group headquartered in Mumbai. It is a specialty packaging manufacturer of laminated plastic tubes for the FMCG and Pharma space.

In 2013, Essel Propack employed more than 2,600 people, and operated 24 facilities in 11 countries, selling more than six billion tubes each year and claims to be the world's largest plastic tubes manufacturer. As of 2009, the company had a global market share of 33% in the toothpaste tube packaging industry.

== History ==
The company was formed from the merger of two pre-existing companies, Essel Packaging and Propack AG led by then CEO Cyrus Bagwadia.

In 2002, Essel Propack set up a 60,000 sq.ft, US$15 Million manufacturing plant in Danville, Virginia, to make toothpaste tubes for Procter & Gamble's North American market. In the same year, the company set up its fourth plant in China.

The company was acquired by The Blackstone Group in 2019 during an assets sale of the debt-ridden Essel Group. The company was renamed to EPL Limited in October 2020.
