= Essel Group =

Indian media conglomerate

- Type: Private
- Industry: Conglomerate
- Founded: 21 May 1926; 100 years ago
- Founder: Jagannath Goenka
- Headquarters: Mumbai, Maharashtra, India
- Area served: Worldwide
- Key people: Subhash Chandra (chairman)
- Services: Mass media; Packaging; Infrastructure; Financial services
- Revenue: ▼₹ 16,800 crore (US$2.4 billion) (2023)
- Net income: ▼₹ -158 crore (US$ -19 million) (2023)
- Number of employees: 10,000+ (2021)
- Subsidiaries: Z Media Corporation Limited (4.34%); Z Entertainment Enterprises Limited (3.99%); Dish TV (4.04%); Siti Networks (6.10%)
- Website: www.esselgroup.com

Essel Group (also known as Zee Group) is an Indian media conglomerate, headquartered in Mumbai, India. The group has had business interests in mass media, infrastructure and packaging. Founded in 1926 as the Messrs Ramgopal Indraprasad by Jagannath Goenka, the company was expanded and converted into the Essel Group of Industries by his grandson, Subhash Chandra. Chandra is part of the Goenka (Goel) family which owns and operates the group; he was also the chairman of the company and a former member of the Rajya Sabha.

Experiencing financial troubles in 2019, Essel sold off several of its assets, including Essel Propack and stakes in Zee Entertainment Enterprises.

== History ==
=== 1926–1967 ===
In 1926, Jagannath Goenka founded the Messrs Ramgopal Indraprasad as a commercial firm to deal in food grains at the mandi (product market) in Adampur, Hisar. In 1946, as a result of poor performance in Adampur, the firm moved to the town of Hisar. Goenka attempted to expand the business in 1948 by setting up a pulses polishing factory in Delhi, but he suffered heavy losses, forcing him to cease Delhi operations in 1951. He moved the Delhi machinery to Hisar, where he was able to turn consistent profits by selling polished whole grains to Gujarat and South India. By 1966, the firm was operating one dal mill and two cotton ginning factories.

=== 1967–1992 ===
In 1967, the business suffered a series of losses, leaving the Goenka family at a net deficit of ₹600,000 (equivalent to ₹35 million or US$370,000 in 2026). Between 1967–68, the Goenkas' connections in the Food Corporation of India (FCI) helped the family secure not only a deal to supply it with polished pulses and cleaned barley but also a later contract for storage of food grains.

In 1973, control of the company was handed over to Subhash Chandra, the grandson of Jagannath Goenka.

The company renamed itself the Essel Group in 1976. After acquiring a storage contract with the FCI in the same year, Essel established a new subsidiary, Lamina Packers, to manufacture packaging materials. In 1981, Essel obtained lucrative export contracts for rice and soya beans as a result of Indo–USSR bilateral trade agreements. According to a 2014 estimate, Essel Group's net worth by 1982 was over ₹100 crore (equivalent to ₹174 crore or US$19 million in 2026).

In December 1982, Lamina Packers became incorporated as Essel Packaging, which marked Essel Group's full-blown venture into the packaging industry, with the primary product being the laminated tube units that originated with Lamina Packers. In 1983, the group also began investing in a future amusement park in Mumbai. EsselWorld opened six years later, becoming India's first amusement park. Although the park was partly meant to signal that its parent corporation wanted to be a major force in the entertainment industry, EsselWorld always remained unprofitable, right up to its shutdown in 2023.

=== 1992–Present ===
As of 1992, Essel Group began to take a bigger interest and stake in the entertainment industry. That year it incorporated Zee Telefilms Ltd and then looked for a place where Zee's content could be broadcast. Zee and Star TV entered into a joint venture called Asia Today Ltd so Zee could lease a transponder from satellite network AsiaSat. The transponder agreement was signed in April 1992, and Zee TV began broadcasting on 1 October. It was India's first Hindi Language satellite channel, and by 1994 it had captured 65% of the satellite market share. Zee TV remained the market leader until 2000.

In 1994, Essel Group incorporated Siti Cable to be the distribution subsidiary of Zee Telefilms. Siti would provide cable service to customers to expand the reach of Zee's satellite channels.

The company continued to develop entertainment channels that successfully competed with Star India, a Star TV subsidiary. In 1998, Essel/Zee turned to journalism with Zee News, the first 24x7 Hindi Language news channel in India.

In 2000, Zee Telefilms ended its partnership with Star TV by buying out its shares in Asia Today Ltd. Star India was now free to produce programmes in Hindi in an attempt to target local audiences and lure Zee's viewers away.

== Assets ==
=== Zee Media Corporation (4.34% stake) ===
Zee Media Corporation Limited
- Type: Public
- Traded as: BSE: 532794; NSE: ZEEMEDIA
- Industry: News Media
- Headquarters: Mumbai, Maharashtra, India
- Key people: Jawahar Goel (Editor-in-chief)
- Brands: Zee News, Daily News and Analysis
- Revenue: ₹640 crore (US$68 million) (2020)
- Net income: ₹−273 crore (US$−29 million) (2020)
- Number of employees: 1,719 (2020)
- Website: www.zeemedia.in

The Zee Media Corporation Limited (abbreviated as ZMCL; formerly Zee News Limited) is the news broadcasting company of the Essel Group. The company operates a constellation of news channels under the brand name of Zee including the English language news channel WION. The Zee News channel is the flagship channel of the company. The Zee Media Corporation also owns and operates the ZEE5 distribution platform.

It was involved in a joint venture with the Dainik Bhaskar Group for the publication of the Daily News & Analysis newspaper but the paper was discontinued in 2019 after suffering loses. The corporation also runs the Zee Institute of Media Arts (ZIMA) which is owned by Zee Learn, the schooling subsidiary of the Essel Group.

The Zee Media Corporation was formerly a subsidiary of the Zee Telefilms Ltd (later renamed to Zee Entertainment Enterprises) and existed under the name of Zee News Limited. It was demerged as a separate company of the Essel Group in 2006. The Zee News Limited was renamed to Zee Media Corporation in 2013.

==== Operated channels By Zee Media Corporation ====
| Channel | Launched | Language | Category | SD/HD availability | Notes |
|---|---|---|---|---|---|
| Zee News | 1999 | Hindi | News | SD | HD version coming soon |
| Zee Bharat | 2017 | Hindi | News | SD | |
| Zee Business | 2005 | Hindi | News | SD | |
| Zee 24 Ghanta | 2007 | Bengali | News | SD | |
| WION | 2016 | English | News | SD | HD version coming soon |
| Zee 24 Taas | 2007 | Marathi | News | SD | |
| Zee 24 Kalak | 2017 | Gujarati | News | SD | |
| Zee Rajasthan | 2013 | Hindi | News | SD | |
| Zee Uttar Pradesh Uttarakhand | 2017 | Hindi | News | SD | |
| Zee Madhya Pradesh Chhattisgarh | 2017 | Hindi | News | SD | |
| Zee Punjab Haryana Himachal | 2013 | Hindi | News | SD | |
| Zee Bihar Jharkhand | 2017 | Hindi | News | SD | |
| Zee Salaam | 2010 | Urdu | News | SD | |

==== Defunct/Former channels ====
| Channel | Language | Category | SD/HD availability | Notes |
|---|---|---|---|---|
| Zee 24 Gantalu | Telugu | News | SD | |
| Zee Odisha | Odia | News | SD | |

=== Siti Networks (6.1% stake) ===
Siti Networks Limited (abbreviated as SNL; formerly Wire & Wireless India Limited; alternatively Siti Cable) is the multi-system operator of the Essel Group. It provides cable distribution services for household consumption. Established in 1994 as a subsidiary of the Zee Telefilms Ltd (later renamed to Zee Entertainment Enterprises), it was founded as a separate company of the Essel Group following the de-merger of the Zee Telefilms in 2006.

In October 2021, it was reported that promotes have just 6.1% stake left in Siti Networks.

=== Dish TV (4.04% stake) ===
DishTV India Limited (abbreviated as DTIL, stylised as dishtv) is a Direct to Home (DTH) television provider company which provides DTH service through multiple brands such as Dish TV, d2h and Zing Digital. Dish TV was launched on 2 October 2003 as the DTH provider of the Essel Group and was merged with Videocon D2H on 22 March 2018. The Essel Group maintains a 55% stake in the company while the Videocon Group maintains a 45% stake. It became the largest DTH provider in India after the merger. The company is also partnered with The Times Group owned MX Player for streaming services.

In May 2021, it was reported that promoters' shareholding in Dish TV has fallen to just 5.67% and Yes Bank has become biggest stock owner of Dish TV. The shareholding further fell to 4.04% by 2023.

=== Zee Entertainment Enterprises (3.99% stake) ===
The Zee Entertainment Enterprises Limited (abbreviated as ZEEL; formerly Zee Telefilms Limited) is a media and entertainment broadcasting company. It was the primary profit generating company of the Essel Group. It owns a constellation of entertainment channels under the brand name of Zee and the channels under the brands of Living Entertainment, Big and "&". The Zee Entertainment Enterprise also owns and operates the record label of Zee Music Company and the film studio of Zee Studios.

The company was incorporated in 1992 as the Zee Telefilms Limited, the Essel Group's venture into mass media. It launched its flagship television channel, Zee TV on 1 October 1992. In 2006, two subsidiaries of the company were de-merged from the Zee Telefilms Ltd and segregated as distinct ententes under the Essel Group. Zee News Ltd (later renamed to Zee Media Corporation) became the news broadcasting subsidiary of the group while Wire & Wireless India Limited (later renamed to Siti Networks) became the cable distribution company of the group. Following the segregation, Zee Telefilms was rebranded as to Zee Entertainment Enterprises.

Between 2002–2018, the Zee Entertainment Enterprises was involved a joint venture with american distribution brand Turner India for the distribution of channels in India, Nepal and Bhutan. The company was involved in sports broadcasting between 2004–2016. It launched its own private cricket league, the Indian Cricket League which held two seasons between 2007–2009 but the league failed to gain traction. In 2016, it sold off all its sports broadcasting assets in the venture to Sony.

As of 2020, the company has suffered successive reduction in revenue and has been subjected to investigative probes by the Enforcement Directorate. The Essel Group has divested a part of its shares in the company for the repayment of pending dues, reducing its stake in the company to 22.37% with much of the remaining stake still pledged as collateral to the remaining dues.

In September 2021 ZEEL Announced merger with Sony Pictures Networks India.

In October 2021, it was reported that founder Subhash Chandra and his son, Punit Goenka together own just 3.99% stake of Zee Entertainment.

On 22 December the board of Zee Entertainment Enterprises approved the merger with Sony Pictures Networks India. and now pending for government approval.

=== Zee Learn (15.05% stake) ===
The Zee Learn Limited (abbreviated as ZLL; informally referred to as Zee Schools) is the for-profit education company of the Essel Group. Incorporated in 1958, the company did not begin operating until 2010. Zee Learn founded the private school chains of Kidzee preschools and Mount Litera Zee K–12 schools. As of 2019, it had more than 1,900 Kidzee preschools and 120 Mount Litera Zee schools across India and three institutes of higher education; the Zee Institute of Media Arts (ZIMA), Zee Institute of Creative Arts (ZICA) and the Himgiri Zee University, Dehradun (HZU). The company also promoted and operated he ZeeQ channel of the Zee Entertainment Enterprises. The student coaching firm MT Educare became a subsidiary of Zee Learn following an acquisition in May 2018. It has been inactive since 2020 and has become a direct subsidiary of Zee Entertainment Enterprises despite having a separate stock listing.

=== Others ===
The group owned and operated amusement parks of "Essel World" and "Water Kingdom" in Mumbai. Essel World was one of the first amusement parks in India; it was shut down in April 2023.

The Shirpur Gold Refinery uses the brand name of Zee Gold in a joint venture with the Essel Group for the marketing of the refinery's products; the Essel Group gets royalties of 20% on the net profit for the brand usage. The Refinery recently went public diluting Essel Group's stake to 43.66%.

The group also operated the online lottery Playwin in Sikkim. The lottery however ceased operation in 2020, following the sale of assets by the Essel Group for the repayment of pending debts.

Essel Group had founded and operated Essel Propack until sale of their stake in 2019.

Between 2020 and 2021, Essel Group sold Essel Finance's MSME loan book to Adani Capital, and Essel Mutual Fund to Navi Group.

== Controversy ==
=== Zee Entertainment Enterprises Limited (Dispute between Promoters) ===
On 11 September 2021, Invesco asked Zee management to call an "extraordinary general meeting" (EGM) of shareholders to consider its demands. One of the main demands was the removal of Punit Goenka, son of the Zee Network founder. However the Zee board rejected the demand from Invesco to convene an extraordinary general meeting. Invesco Developing Market Funds Moves to a National Company Law Tribunal (NCLT) and the Bombay High Court, seeking a mandatory order for Zee Enterprises Entertainment Limited (ZEEL) to call the extraordinary general meeting (EGM) that the shareholder has been demanding.

OFI Global China Fund, who also moved the NCLT along with Invesco, remarked at the hearing that the meeting that Zee Entertainment board had conducted on October 1 was just a legal formality and that it is a classic case of Forum shopping.

On 11 October 2021, Invesco wrote an open letter to the other shareholders saying they are disappointed that the leadership of Zee has resorted to a reckless public relations campaign in response to the overwhelming demand from shareholders for leadership changes at Zee network. They had also tried to merge Zee with some other Indian company in early 2021, but the Zee board rejected it.

The Zee Board replied to Invesco's open letter saying they didn't care about the company, and Invesco is not motivated by concerns related to any corporate governance issue, but "by the events that transpired during February-April 2021 pointing Invesco purposed deal with Reliance Industries.

Reliance Industries Ltd (RIL) said it proposed to merge all its media properties with Zee Entertainment at fair valuations during discussions in February and March 2021 that US investment firm Invesco helped arrange with managing director and member of the founding family of the media and entertainment company.

On 21 October, the Bombay High Court asked the Zee board to call an EGM as demanded by shareholder Invesco, and counsel appearing for Zee Entertainment said the company will inform the court of the date of the EGM by the morning of October 22.

On 7 December, Invesco heading towards a resolution, Invesco was expected to back the merger deal with Sony as long as the Goenka family does not get any preferential equity.

On 22 December, board of Zee Entertainment Enterprises approved the merger with Sony Pictures Networks India.
