= Daily News and Analysis =

Hindi-language news programme on Zee TV

Daily News and Analysis (DNA)
- Type: Newspaper (2005–2019)
- Format: TV show (2012—)
- Owner: Zee Media Corporation
- Publisher: Zee News
- Launched: 30 July 2005; 21 years ago
- Language: English, Hindi
- Headquarters: Noida, Uttar Pradesh
- City: Noida, Uttar Pradesh
- Website: www.dnaindia.com

The Daily News and Analysis, abbreviated as DNA, is a Hindi-language news program on Zee News and former English-language newspaper in India. It was taken over by the Zee Media Corporation in 2012 and essentially shut down except for using its brand name for the news program. DNA was first launched as a broadsheet newspaper out of Mumbai, Maharashtra, India on 30 July 2005 through a 50:50 joint venture between the Zee Media Corporation and the Dainik Bhaskar group under the company name Diligent Media Corporation Ltd.

The newspaper had first launched its outdoor advertising campaign through billboards and placards in Mumbai during early 2005, with the tagline, "Speak Up, It's in Your DNA", which became its catch-phrase over the months. With the announcement of the launch of DNA came several other rival newspapers by large media conglomerates in the city, including the first-time-ever Mumbai edition of the predominantly north-Indian Hindustan Times and the Times of India's rival the Mumbai Mirror newspaper that was later digitised into a web portal during the pandemic.

The competition battleground between the three media conglomerates led to a massive spike in journalists' salaries in Bombay by almost 40–50 per cent of the earlier market rate, or even more, in the 3–4 months prior to the launches, as journalists began receiving hefty counter-offers from the opponent publication they were set to be joining.

It also saw a hike in salary of internal staff in TOI's Delhi office in order to ensure the editorial staff could be retained. Finally, the Times Group signed anti-poaching agreements or pacts with The Hindustan Times and The Telegraph of Calcutta in May 2005, in order to restrict themselves from hiring and poaching each other's staff.

== Coverage ==
DNA catalysed several shifts in the Indian news media over the years. Its focus began with developing hyperlocal teams of reporters around Mumbai covering news from around the neighbouring municipal localities such as Thane and Vashi and the eastern and western suburbs of Mumbai as well as the iconic south Mumbai town area — through regional reporting bureaus managing the news coverage for DNA's local Zone and city pages.

Over the years, the paper further expanded into local editions at Surat and Ahmedabad, then Pune, then Jaipur, then Bangalore, then Indore, and finally Delhi.

Diligent Media Corporation Limited used to also bring out the business broadsheet newspaper DNA Money from Indore, to cover business and finance, as a standalone sister newspaper to DNA during 2006, and it used to publish several women-centric and youth-centric lifestyle magazines as well, such as DNA Ya!, which was a supplement targeted at kids and young adults.

== Closure of print operations ==
The paper had begun to suffer tremendous losses over the years; it started shuttering its operations in Surat shortly after its launch, and, by 2012, Zee had taken over the rest of the ownership of DNA from the Bhaskar group. It had also shut down its lifestyle magazine Me in 2010, citing that the paper's business was geared more towards news and that "the magazine business was dropping" as a whole.

By August 2014, the newspaper had also shut down its Bangalore and Pune editions and, in February 2019, it also closed the Jaipur and Delhi editions. In October 2019, Zee Media Corporation announced that the entire newspaper (including the remaining editions in Ahmedabad and Mumbai) would be closed with the aim of optimizing costs and reducing the company's losses.

== TV show ==
Zee News continues to host DNA as a weekly news bulletin show, which is a prime-time Hindi-language programme hosted on the channel between 9.00 pm to 10.30 pm every weekday from Monday to Friday. The show had begun in 2012 with news anchor Sudhir Chaudhary as its host, who had rejoined the channel in a second career stint. Chaudhary, who had launched the Sahara Samay channel for Sahara TV prior to this, had earlier also been with Zee till 2003. Rohit Ranjan took over the DNA show in July 2022 after Chaudhary left to join Aaj Tak.

Chaudhary told ZMCL chairperson Subhash Chandra in his resignation letter that he was intending to use his fan following to start his own venture at some point, while Chandra stated that he had attempted to persuade Chaudhary to stay back.
