= Rohit Gandhi =

Indian journalist and documentarian

- Education: Delhi University; Carleton University
- Occupations: Journalist and documentary film-maker
- Years active: 1995–present
- Spouse: M Kumari Singh
- Awards: Emmy Award; Alfred duPont Award

Rohit Gandhi is an international journalist. He was the founder and editor-in-chief of World is One News (WION) and DNA India.

== Education ==
In 1989, Gandhi enrolled at the University of Delhi for his undergraduate education. He was awarded the degree of Bachelor of Arts (Hons.) Sociology and Anthropology in 1992.

In 1992, after completing his graduation, he went to the University of Pune for further studies. There, he studied for a master's degree in Communication and Media Studies.

In 1999, he went to Carleton University in Canada to study broadcast journalism. He completed his studies the next year and achieved a master's degree in Broadcast Journalism.

== Career ==
From 2000 to 2006, he was a producer at CNN.

Between 2015 and 2017, he was the editor-in-chief of Zee Media CL (Digital), WION and DNA India.

Gandhi set up Democracy News Live, a digital news network, in 2017.
