= Living Travelz =

Indian food and travel television channel

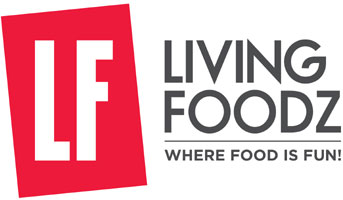
- Country: India
- Headquarters: Mumbai, Maharashtra, India

Programming
- Language(s): Hindi and English

Ownership
- Owner: Zee Entertainment Enterprises
- Sister channels: Living Foodz

History
- Launched: 13 February 2017
- Closed: 27 December 2017

Living Travelz is an Indian food and travel television channel based in Mumbai, Maharashtra, India. It is a part of the Living Entertainment brand of channels, which is owned by Zee Entertainment Enterprises. Programs are hosted by chefs and anchors like Ranveer Brar, Kunal Kapur, Maria Goretti and Pankaj Bhadouria.

== Programming ==
- Ranveer's Cafe: Ranveer Brar showcases international recipes with an Indian twist along with live musical performances by guests.
- Chef on Wheels: Gautam Mehrishi goes on road trips to find out where fruits and vegetables originate.
- Pickle Nation: Kunal Kapur travels across India chronicling the different kinds of pickles and their preparation methods.
- Food Xpress: TV anchors Rocky and Mayur go on a culinary journey around India.
- Kitchen Magic: Mehrishi experiments with common recipes and shares techniques that can be used at home.
- I Love Cooking: Maria Goretti gives her own touch to traditional recipes and dishes.
- The Great Indian Rasoi: Brar features long lost recipes and hidden secrets in traditional Indian kitchens.
- Vickypedia – Vicky Ratnani presents international.
