= Zee Entertainment Enterprises =

Indian media conglomerate pvt ltd

Zee Entertainment Enterprises Limited
- Logo since 2025
- Formerly: Zee Telefilms Limited (1992-2006)
- Type: Public
- Traded as: BSE: 505537; NSE: ZEEL
- Industry: Mass media; Entertainment
- Founded: 25 November 1992; 33 years ago
- Founder: Subhash Chandra
- Headquarters: Mumbai, Maharashtra, India
- Area served: Worldwide
- Key people: Subhash Chandra (chairman); Punit Goenka (CEO)
- Products: Broadcasting, films, music, streaming, web portals
- Revenue: ▼₹2,112 crore (US$230 million) (2022)
- Net income: ▼₹−196 crore (US$−21 million) (2022)
- Total assets: ▼₹13,239 crore (US$1.4 billion) (2022)
- Number of employees: 3,429 (2021)
- Parent: Essel Group
- Subsidiaries: Zee Music; Zee Studios
- Website: zee.com

Zee Entertainment Enterprises Limited (ZEEL) (formerly Zee Telefilms) is an Indian media conglomerate. Headquartered in Mumbai, it has interests in television, print, internet, film, and businesses related to mobile content, and operates 35 channels worldwide.

== History ==
=== Independent era ===
Logo used from 2017 to 2025

In April 1995, the company launched the premium movie channel Zee Cinema, the first channel of its sort in the country. Until 1999, programming was done by Star TV. In the following years Zee Cinema has also catered to international markets like South-East America, Europe, Middle East, North Africa, Pakistan, Indonesia and Asia Pacific and the Rest of Africa. Zee Cinema (Canada) is available in Canada as a joint ventures with Ethnic Group.

Zee Telefilms launched a Nickelodeon-branded programming block in 1999 as part of a distribution deal between MTV Networks International and Zee Telefilms. It was replaced by a new Cartoon Network block in 2002.

In 2008, Zee Networks launched Zee Motion Pictures and Zee Limelight (now Zee Studios) for the development, production, distribution and marketing of mainstream films in Indian languages, including Hindi, Malayalam, Tamil, Telugu, Kannada, Bengali and Marathi.

In 2015, Zee acquired Sarthak TV, an Odia-language pay television channel.

In 2017, the company acquired the majority stake of the Reliance Broadcast Network. It also planned to acquire 9X Media in October 2017 for the cost of ₹160 crore, however, the plan fell through in March 2018. A partially owned subsidiary, Diligent Media Corporation, is a publisher of Indian daily newspapers and websites. DMC is a joint venture between Zee and the Dainik Bhaskar Group.

In 2018, Zee launched Zee Theatre, which offers a collection of recorded theatre plays also called teleplay- produced in India and internationally.

=== Sale talks ===
In February 2019, media reported that Essel Group was in talks to sell their shares from the Zee Entertainment Enterprises to save them from debt.

Top Sony officials including Mike Hopkins, chairman of Sony Pictures Television, and Tony Vinciquerra, chairman of Sony Pictures, had visited Subhash Chandra and his family at his residence shortly after Chandra announced his intent to sell half of the promoter holding in Zee Entertainment Enterprises to a global strategic investor.
On 2 April reports said that some other promoters were willing to sell their shares worth ₹332 crore.
On 3 April media reported the Sony and Zee Entertainment Enterprises deal was off.

On 1 August media reports Invesco Oppenheimer Fund to buy 11% stake in Zee Entertainment.

In September 2021, it was reported that Invesco Developing Markets Funds and OFI Global China Fund LLC, who jointly holds a 17.88% stake, wanted Punit Goenka (also the son of founder) to step down as MD and CEO. It was also reported that Essel Group owns a sum of 3.99% minority stake.

In 2024, Zee Entertainment Enterprises partnered with Sony Pictures Entertainment.

==== Attempted merger with Sony Pictures Networks India ====
On 22 September 2021, the company announced its intent to merge with Sony Pictures Networks India. Sony Pictures will hold a majority stake in the proposed merged entity, which will be headed by Zee's Punit Goenka. In December 2021, the merger was approved by the two companies boards. Sony will hold a stake close to 51% in the company, with Zee controlling the remaining stake.

On 10 August 2023, the National Company Law Tribunal approved the proposed Sony/Zee merger.

On 18 January 2024, the anticipated $10 billion merger between Zee Entertainment Enterprises and Sony Pictures India progressed as ZEE's stock increased amid reports that CEO Punit Goenka might step down, potentially resolving a major deadlock in the merger process. However, on 22 January 2024, Sony Pictures Networks India issued a notice to Zee Entertainment Enterprises effectively terminating the merger proceedings due to, among other reasons, the closing conditions to the merger not being satisfied by the given deadline of 21 January.

== Controversy ==
=== Dispute between promoters ===
On 11 September 2021, Invesco asked Zee management to call shareholders an "extraordinary general meeting" (EGM) to consider its demands. One of the main demands was the removal of Punit Goenka, son of the Zee Network founder. However Zee board rejects a demand from Invesco to convene an extraordinary general meeting. Invesco Developing Market Funds Moves to National Company Law Tribunal (NCLT) and Bombay High Court seeking a mandatory order for Zee Enterprises Entertainment Limited (ZEEL) to call the extraordinary general meeting (EGM) that the shareholder has been demanding.

Zee Board replied to Invesco's open letter saying they didn't care about the company, and Invesco was not motivated by concerns related to any corporate governance issue but "by the events that transpired during February–April 2021 pointing Invesco purposed deal with Reliance Industries.

On 21 October, Bombay High Court asked the Zee board to call EGM as demanded by shareholder Invesco, and Counsel appearing for Zee Entertainment said the company will inform the date of the EGM by the morning of 22 October.

On 22 October, Zee replied to the court that the board can't give a nod to something that will turn out to be illegal, so HC postponed hearing of the Zee-Invesco matter to 26 October. Also, on 26 October Bombay High Court had restrained Invesco from taking any action in furtherance of their requisition notice (to call an EGM).

On 7 December, Invesco headed towards a resolution expected to back the merger deal with Sony as long as the Goenka family does not get any preferential equity.

On 22 December, Board of Zee signed definitive agreements with Sony after received approval from its board of directors

=== Zee Music vs Sonu Nigam ===
Sonu Nigam alleged that he was banned by the Zee Music Company after he tweeted in support of politician Kumar Vishwas.

== Owned assets ==
=== On-air channels ===
==== India ====
| Channel | Launched | Language | Category | SD/HD | Notes |
|---|---|---|---|---|---|
| Zee TV | 1992 | Hindi | General Entertainment | SD+HD | |
| &TV | 2015 | Hindi | General Entertainment | SD+HD | |
| Anmol TV | 2013 | Hindi | General Entertainment | SD | Formerly known as Zee Anmol |
| Zee Zindagi | 2014 | Hindi | General Entertainment | SD | |
| Zee Cinema | 1995 | Hindi | Movies | SD+HD | |
| Zee Classic | 2005 | Hindi | Movies | SD | |
| Zee Action | 2006 | Hindi | Movies | SD | |
| Big Magic | 2011 | Hindi | Movies | SD | |
| Zee Bollywood | 2018 | Hindi | Movies | SD | |
| Anmol Cinema | 2016 | Hindi | Movies | SD | Formerly known as Zee Anmol Cinema |
| Anmol Cinema 2 | 2024 | Hindi | Movies | SD | Replaced Zee Ganga; Formerly known as Zee Anmol Cinema 2 |
| &Pictures | 2013 | Hindi | Movies | SD+HD | |
| &Xplor | 2019 | Hindi | Movies | SD+HD | SD Replaced &Prive HD |
| Zing | 2009 | Hindi | Youth | SD | Formerly Zee Muzic |
| Unite8 Sports 1 | 2026 | Hindi | Sports | SD+HD | Replaced Zee Café |
| Unite8 Sports 2 | 2026 | English | Sports | SD+HD | Replaced &flix |
| Zee Zest | 2010 | Hindi; English | Lifestyle | SD+HD | Formerly Zee Khana Khazana and Living Foodz |
| Zee Theatre | 2018 | Hindi; English; Urdu; Marathi; Gujarati | TV Plays | SD | |
| Zee Bangla | 1999 | Bengali | General Entertainment | SD+HD | Formerly Alpha TV Bangla |
| Zee Bangla Sonar | 2025 | Bengali | Movies | SD | Replaced Zee Bangla Cinema |
| Zee Biskope | 2020 | Bhojpuri | Movies | SD | |
| Zee Marathi | 1999 | Marathi | General Entertainment | SD+HD | Formerly Alpha TV Marathi |
| Zee Yuva | 2016 | Marathi | General Entertainment | SD | |
| Zee Talkies | 2007 | Marathi | Movies | SD+HD | |
| Zee Sarthak | 2010 | Odia | General Entertainment | SD | Formerly Sarthak TV |
| Zee Punjabi | 2020 | Punjabi | General Entertainment | SD | Formerly Alpha TV Punjabi |
| Zee Tamil | 2008 | Tamil | General Entertainment | SD+HD | |
| Zee Thirai | 2020 | Tamil | Movies | SD+HD | |
| Zee Telugu | 2004 | Telugu | General Entertainment | SD+HD | Formerly Alpha TV Telugu |
| Zee Cinemalu | 2016 | Telugu | Movies | SD+HD | |
| Zee Kannada | 2006 | Kannada | General Entertainment | SD+HD | |
| Zee Power | 2025 | Kannada | Movies | SD | Replaced Zee Picchar |
| Zee Keralam | 2018 | Malayalam | General Entertainment | SD+HD | |

==== International ====
| Channel | Launched | Language | Category | SD/HD | Broadcast Region | Notes |
|---|---|---|---|---|---|---|
| Zee Magic | 2015 | French | General Entertainment | SD | Africa; Indian Ocean | |
| Zee Bioskop | 2014 | Indonesian | Movies Channel | SD | Indonesia | |
| Zee Aflam | 2008 | Arabic | Movies Channel | SD | Middle East | |
| Zee Alwan | 2012 | Arabic | General Entertainment | SD | Middle East and North Africa | |
| Zee Dunia | 2025 | Swahili; English | General Entertainment | SD | Kenya | |
| Zee Nung | 2014 | Thai | Movies Channel | SD | Thailand | |
| Zee Alem | 2020 | Amharic | General Entertainment | SD | Ethiopia | |
| Zee One Africa | 2021 | English isiZulu | General Entertainment | SD | South Africa | |
| Zee Zonke | 2023 | isiZulu | General Entertainment | SD+HD | South Africa | |
| Zee Mundo | 2016 | Spanish | Movies Channel | SD+HD | United States; Latin America | |
| Zee Bollyworld | 2015 | Hindi; English | General Entertainment | HD | Latin America | |
| Zee Sine | 2016 (Original); 2025 (Relaunch) | Filipino | Movies Channel | HD | Philippines | |
| Zee World | 2015 | English | General Entertainment | SD+HD | Africa | |
| Zee Bollymovies | 2017 | English | Movies Channel | HD | Africa | |
| Zee One | 2016 (Original); 2023 (Relaunch) | German; French; English | General Entertainment | SD+HD | EU | |

=== Defunct channels ===
==== India ====
| Channel | Launched | Defunct | Language | Category | SD/HD | Notes |
|---|---|---|---|---|---|---|
| EL TV | 1996 | 1998 | Hindi | General Entertainment | SD | Replaced with Zee India TV |
| Zee Smile | 2004 | 2016 | Hindi | General Entertainment | SD | Formerly Smile TV |
| 9X | 2007 | 2015 | Hindi | General Entertainment | SD | Acquired from 9X Media |
| Zee Next | 2007 | 2009 | Hindi | General Entertainment | SD | |
| Zee Premier | 2006 | 2015 | Hindi | Movies | SD | Formerly Premier Cinema |
| ā Music Asia | 1997 | 2000 | Hindi | Music | SD | Replaced with Zee Muzic |
| Zee Muzic | 2000 | 2009 | Hindi | Music | SD | Replaced with Zing TV |
| Zee ETC Bollywood | 1999 | 2020 | Hindi | Music | SD | Formerly ETC and ETC Bollywood |
| ZeeQ | 2010 | 2017 | Hindi | Kids | SD | |
| Zee Jagran | 2005 | 2015 | Hindi | Devotional | SD | |
| Zee Khana Khazana | 2010 | 2015 | Hindi | Lifestyle | SD | Replaced with Living Foodz |
| Zee India TV | 1998 | 1999 | Hindi | Infotainment | SD | Replaced with Zee News |
| Zee Café | 2000 | 2026 | English | General Entertainment | SD+HD | Replaced with Unite8 Sports 1 (Hindi) |
| &flix | 2018 | 2026 | English | Movies | SD+HD | Replaced with Unite8 Sports 2 (English) |
| Zee Select | 2004 | 2005 | English | Movies | SD | Formerly MX |
| Zee Studio | 2005 | 2018 | English | Movies | SD | Formerly Zee Movies, Zee MGM and Zee Movie Zone (ZMZ) Replaced With &flix |
| &Privé HD | 2017 | 2026 | English | Movies | HD | Replaced With & Xplor SD |
| Zee Trendz | 2003 | 2014 | English | Lifestyle | SD | Formerly Trendz TV |
| Zee Sports | 2005 | 2010 | English | Sports | SD | Merged with TEN Action |
| Living Foodz | 2015 | 2020 | English; Hindi | Lifestyle | SD+HD | Replaced with Zee Zest |
| Living Zen | 2016 | 2019 | English; Hindi | Lifestyle | SD | |
| Living Travelz | 2017 | 2017 | English; Hindi | Knowledge | SD | |
| Zee Bangla Cinema | 2012 | 2025 | Bengali | Movies | SD | Replaced with Zee Bangla Sonar |
| Zee Ganga | 2013 | 2024 | Bhojpuri | General Entertainment | SD | Replaced with Zee Anmol Cinema 2 |
| Zee Gujarati | 2000 | 2009 | Gujarati | General Entertainment | SD | Formerly Alpha TV Gujarati |
| Zee Chitramandir | 2021 | 2026 | Marathi | Movies | SD | Formerly Zee Zabardast |
| Zee Vajwa | 2020 | 2022 | Marathi | Music | SD | |
| Zee ETC Punjabi | 2001 | 2014 | Punjabi | General Entertainment | SD | Formerly ETC Punjabi |
| Zee Picchar | 2020 | 2025 | Kannada | Movies | SD+HD | Replaced with Zee Power |

==== International ====
| Channel | Launched | Defunct | Language | Category | SD/HD | Broadcast Region | Notes |
|---|---|---|---|---|---|---|---|
| Zee Arabiya | 2005 | 2008 | Arabic; English | Music; Lifestyle | SD | Middle East | Replaced with Zee Aflam |
| Zee Lamhe | 2013 | 2015 | Hindi | General Entertainment | SD | United Kingdom; EU | Replaced with &TV |
| Zee Sine (Original) | 2016 | 2020 | Filipino | Movies Channel | SD | Philippines | |
| Zee TV Russia | 2007 | 2023 | Russian | General Entertainment | SD | Russia | Replaced with телеканал «Индия» |
| Zee Hiburan | 2015 | 2017 | Indonesian | General Entertainment | SD | Indonesia | |
| Zee One (Original) | 2016 | 2020 | German | General Entertainment | SD | Germany | |
| Zee Variasi | 2006 | 2016 | Malay | General Entertainment; Lifestyle | SD | Malaysia | Replaced with Tara HD |
| Zee Phim | 2017 | 2019 | Vietnamese | Movies Channel | SD | Vietnam | Replaced Zee Hiburan |

== Over The Top (OTT) ==
In February 2016, Zee Entertainment Enterprises forayed into video-on-demand with the launch of its OTT platform OZEE.

On 14 February 2018, this service rebranded as ZEE5. Since its relaunch as ZEE5, it streams all content from its television network and also movies and original series. ZEE5 claimed 57 million monthly active users in December 2019.

== Other assets ==
=== Publishing ===
- bgr
- Mollywood
- cricket country
- The health site
- India.com
- Sugarbox
- Zee5X

=== Event management ===
- Zee Live
- Super moon, Arth, Edu care, It's A Girl Thing
- Zee Theatre

=== Film distribution and music ===
- Zee Studios
- Zee Plex (movie-on-demand service)
- Zee Music Company
