= Luxury packaging =

Type of packaging

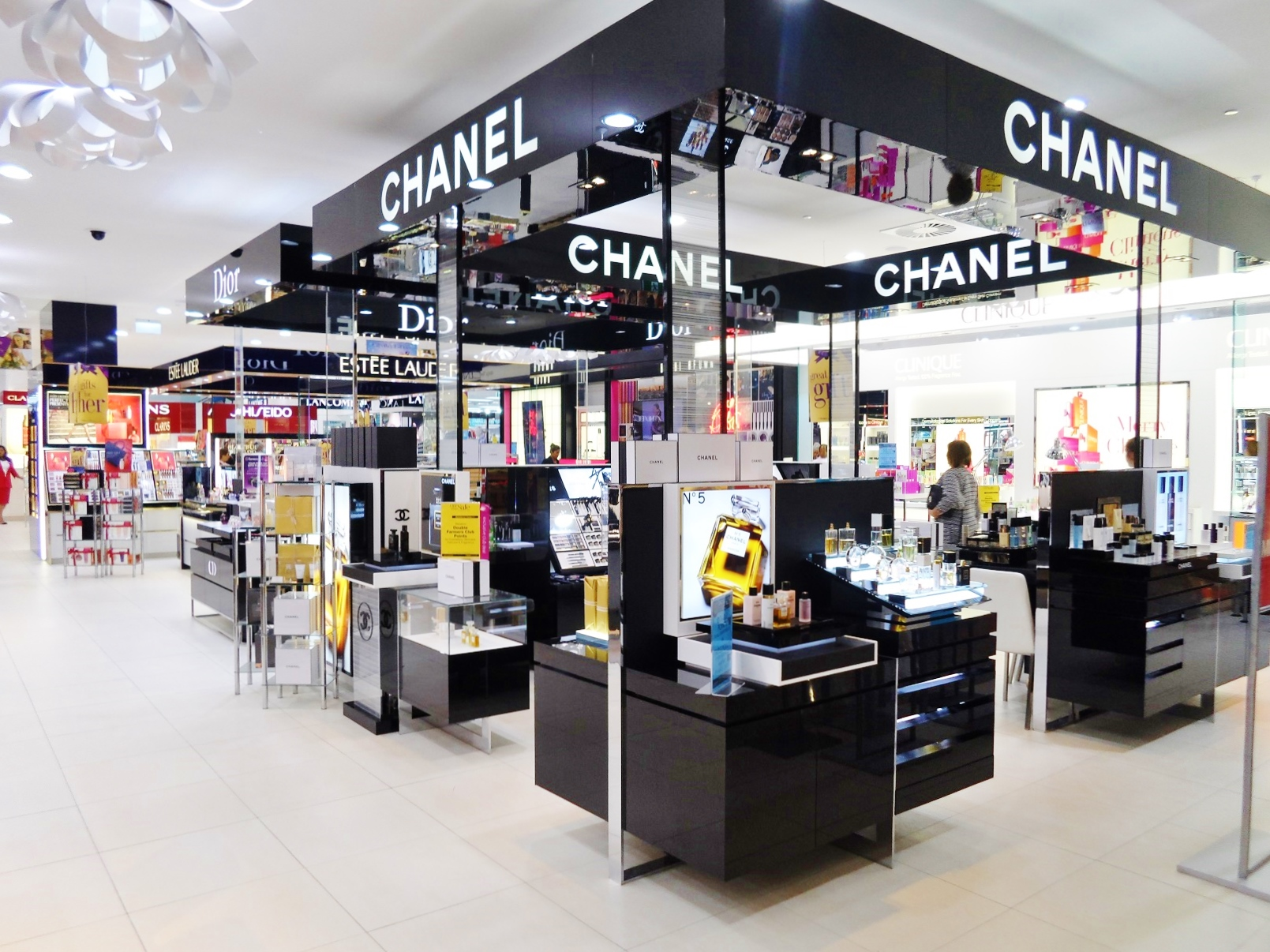
Packaging and display of cosmetics help create an image of luxury

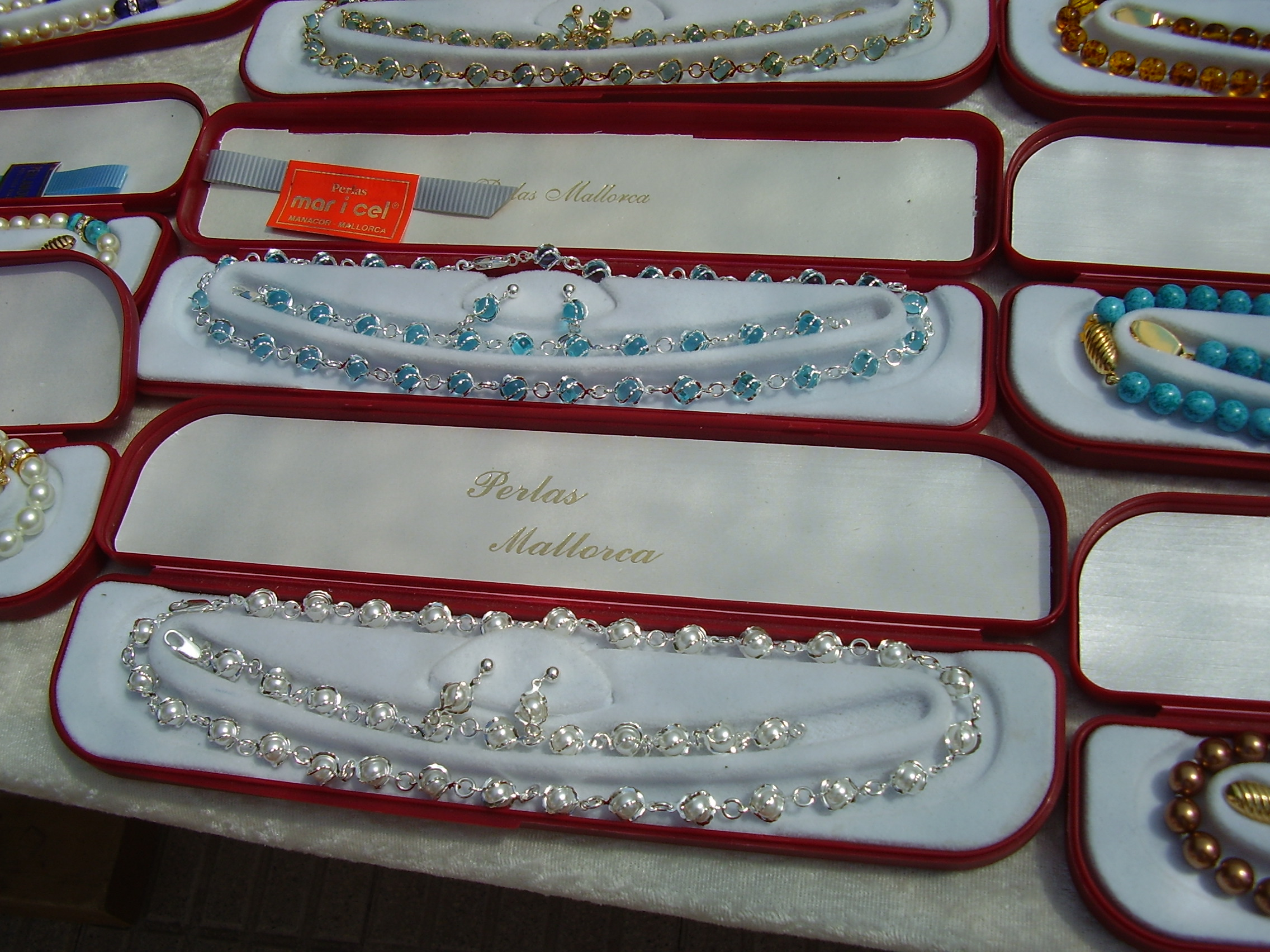
Presentation of jewelry is enhanced by luxury packaging

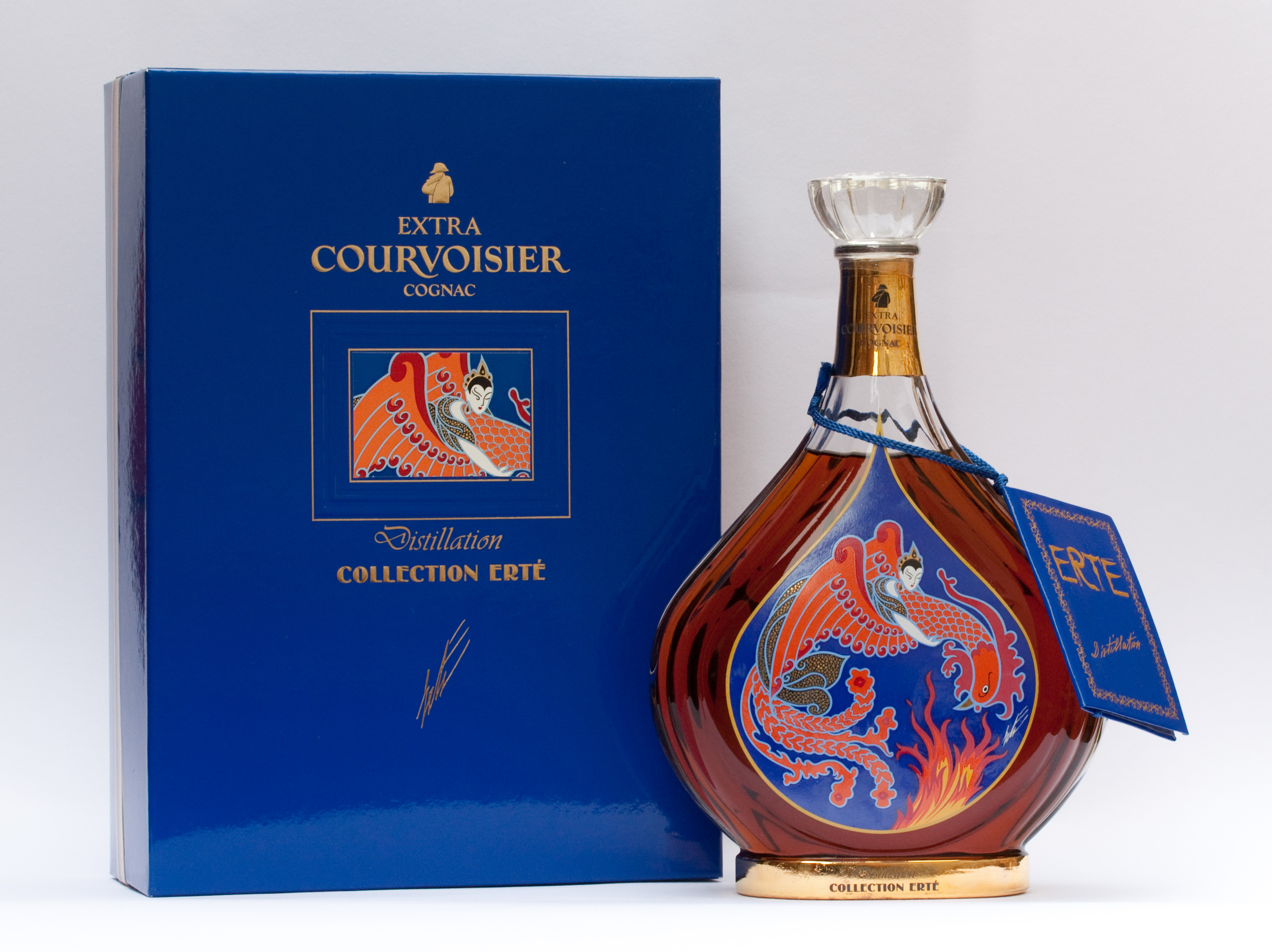
Unique packaging emphasizes specialized brands

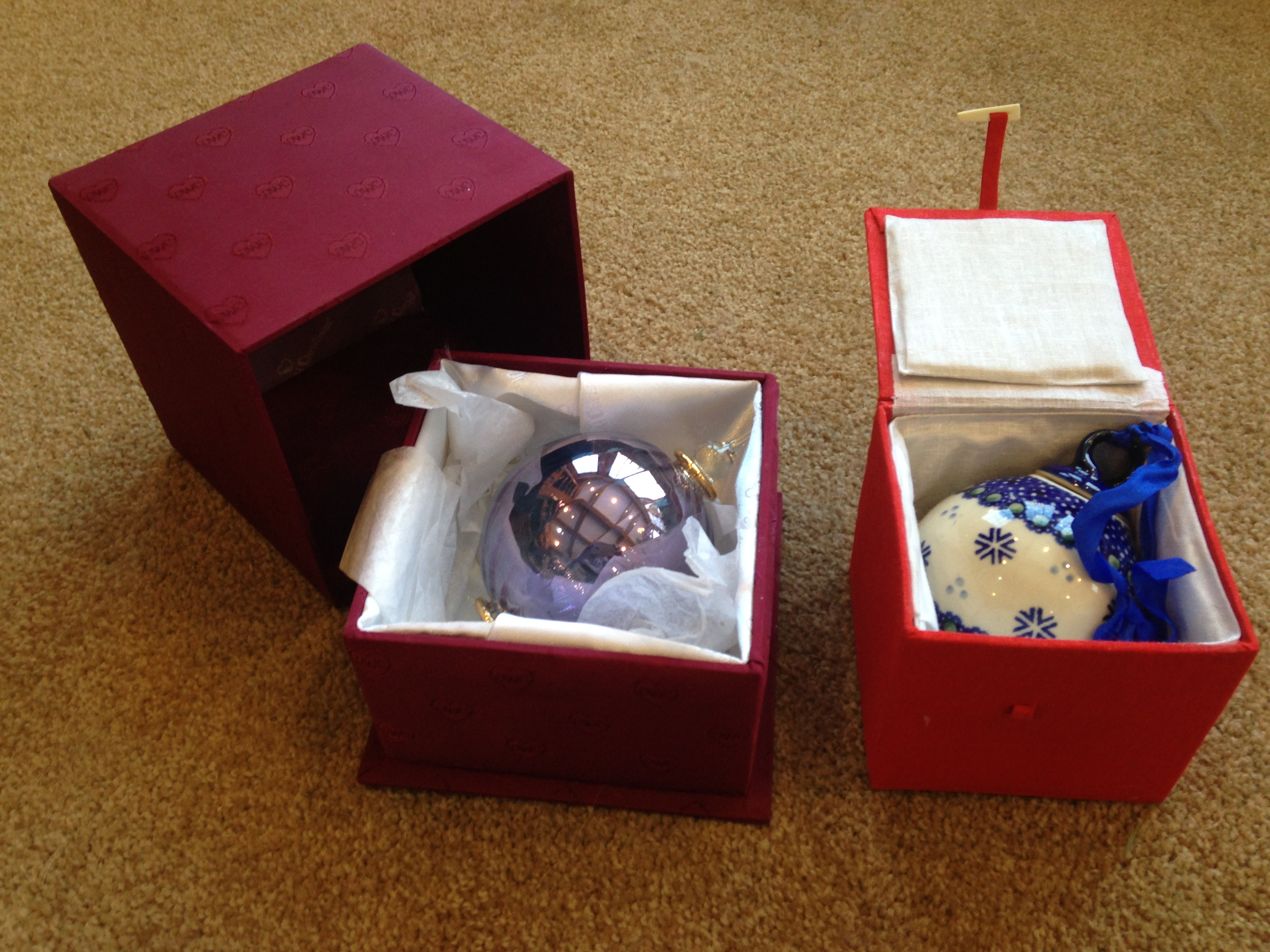
Premium Christmas ornaments in reusable storage boxes

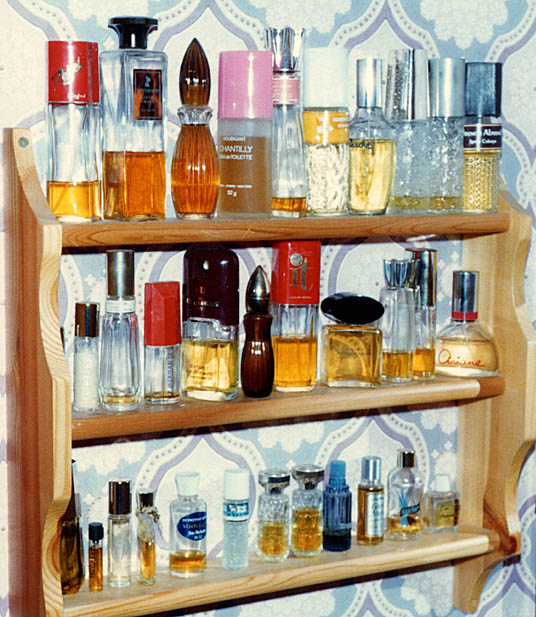
Fragrance bottles.

Luxury and specialty packaging is the design, research, development, and manufacturing of packaging, displays, and for luxury brands. The packaging of a luxury product is part of the brand’s image and research shows consumers are willing to spend more on products if the packaging looks appealing and luxurious.

As well as adding to the value of the product, luxury packaging fulfils various other roles; it enhances the image of the brand, increases consumer engagement through personalised packaging, performs a function, creates appeal and diversifies the product.

Globally, the luxury packaging market continues to grow, driven by global trends of personalised packaging, attention to sustainability issues, and economic and demographic drivers. The luxury packaging market is forecast to grow by 4.4% to 2019, reaching $17.6 billion, and consumption will reach 9.9 billion tons with growth of 3.1%.

== Package development considerations ==
Package design and development are often thought of as an integral part of the new product development process. Alternatively, the development of a package (or component) can be a separate process but must be linked closely to the product to be packaged.

Package design starts with the identification of all the requirements: structural design, marketing, shelf life, quality assurance, logistics, legal, regulatory, graphic design, end-use, and environmental. The design criteria, performance (specified by package testing), completion time targets, resources, and cost constraints need to be established and agreed upon. Package design processes often employ rapid prototyping, computer-aided design, computer-aided manufacturing and document automation.

=== Security ===
High-value products are inviting to theft. Security packaging can be an important consideration to help reduce package pilferage. Authentication technologies can be used to help verify that the expensive luxury product is not among the many counterfeit consumer goods.

Security solutions involve all phases of product production, packaging, distribution, logistics, sale, and use. No single solution is considered "pilfer proof". Often, packaging engineers, logistics engineers, and security professionals have addressed multiple levels of security to reduce the risk of pilfering.

Each situation is unique. Some considerations have included:

- Identifying who a potential thief might be: an internal employee, security guard, truck driver, delivery person, receiver (consignee), organized crime, etc. Engineers usually start with knowing what level of knowledge, materials, tools, etc. might they have.
- Identifying all feasible methods of unauthorized access into a product, package, or system. In addition to the primary means of entry, engineers also consider secondary or "back door" methods.
- Identifying available means of resealing, reclosing, or replacing special seals.
- Using extra strong and secure packaging: A weak or damaged package is an invitation to pilferage.
- Considering unique custom seals and labels (changing regularly because these are subject to counterfeiting)
- Improving the pilfer resistance to make pilfering more difficult, time-consuming, etc.
- Concealing the identity and value of a pilferable item during distribution. Logistics and packaging professionals do not want to bring attention to the item, its package, addresses, names, etc.
- Adding pilfer-evident features to help indicate the existence of pilfering.
- Choosing a logistics provider who can reduce the risks of pilferage.
- Shipping in packages in unit loads with stretch wrap or in intermodal shipping containers with security seals
- Educating people to watch for evidence of pilfering.
- With a corrugated box, using a wider and stronger closure tape, 3-inch or 72 mm, reinforced gummed tape or pressure-sensitive tape.
- Using a tamper-evident security tape or seal on packages that leaves a message, warning, or other indication if removed.
- Installing a surveillance system to help identify any suspects.

== End-use products ==
- Cosmetics and fragrances
- Tobacco
- Confectionery
- Premium alcoholic drinks
- Gourmet food and drinks
- Watches and jewellery

== See also ==
- Gourmet
- Luxury goods
- Designer label
- Veblen goods
- Wealth effect
- Superior goods
