= Subhash Chandra =

Indian media entrepreneur

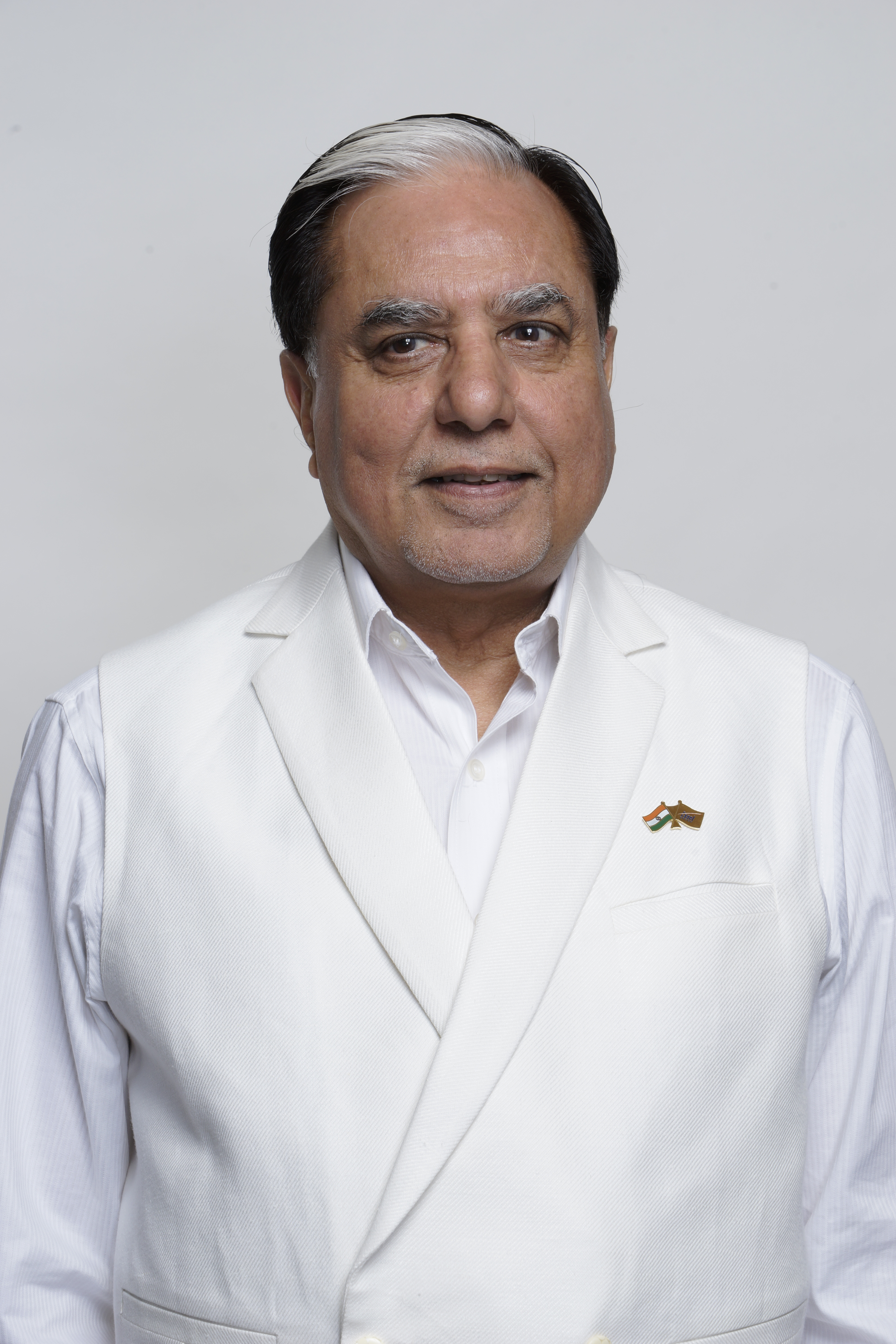

Member of Parliament, Rajya Sabha
- In office 2 August 2016 – 1 August 2022
- Preceded by: Suresh Prabhu
- Constituency: Haryana

Personal details
- Born: 30 November 1950 (age 75) Adampur, Hisar, Haryana, India
- Spouse: Sushila Devi
- Children: Punit Goenka; Amit Goenka
- Occupation: Chairman of Essel Group Chairman Emeritus of ZEE
- Website: www.subhashchandra.com www.subhashchandrafoundation.org

Subhash Chandra Goenka (born 30 November 1950) is an Indian media entrepreneur. He is the chairman of the Essel Group, an Indian media conglomerate that owns Zee Media and the chairman emeritus of Zee Entertainment. He founded Zee TV in 1992 and Zee News in 1999. He was elected to the Upper House of the Indian parliament for the Haryana state in the 2016 Rajya Sabha election, as an independent candidate supported by legislators from the Bharatiya Janata Party (BJP).

On 31 May 2022, Chandra filed his nomination from Rajasthan for elections to the Rajya Sabha as an Independent candidate backed by the BJP, but he lost the election.

In 2026, Chandra underwent personal insolvency proceedings under the Insolvency and Bankruptcy Code, culminating in the NCLT’s approval of a creditor-approved repayment plan related to his personal guarantees for Essel Group borrowings.

On 25 August 2026, he got away with a 99.97 % haircut on his outstanding debts whereby he would pay back a sum of Rs 6.5 crore to settle admitted creditor claims of about Rs 22,006.57 crore when Nilesh Sharma, a member of the Indian insolvency board NCLT rejected objections by lenders that the recovery was too meagre to merit approval.

== Early years ==
Subhash Chandra was born in an Agarwal Bania family in Adampur, Hisar district, Haryana. Forbes India notes that Chandra was born in Rajasthan, and moved with his family to Hisar during his childhood. His family had a debt of ₹3.5 lakh, which he had to repay. His family could not afford his higher education, and in 1965 he dropped out of school to join the family business of commission agents and traders who procured and supplied rice to the Food Corporation of India.

In the 1980s, he started manufacturing flexible packaging (mainly plastic tubes) for fast-moving consumer goods such as toothpaste under the brand name Essel Packaging. He followed it up with a leisure park Essel World in north Mumbai.

In 1992, he launched Zee TV, the second private commercial television channel in the country in association with Star TV in Hong Kong, and in 2003, Dish TV, the first satellite television provider in India.

== Business ==
Chandra established Essel Propack (now known as EPL Ltd) in 1981; India's 1st company to introduce laminated tubes in the country. The company was acquired by Blackstone in 2019.

Chandra launched Essel World, India's 1st amusement park and Water Kingdom, Asia's largest theme water park in 1989.

Chandra set up Siti Networks in 1994; one of India's 1st multi system operators and Dish TV in 2003.

Chandra launched India's first satellite TV channel, Zee TV, in 1992. The channel competes with, among others, Sony Entertainment Television and STAR Plus. Currently, the Zee TV network consists of up to 90 channels, reaching 1.3 billion people spread over 174 countries.

In 2005, in collaboration with the Dainik Bhaskar group, Chandra launched an English-language daily newspaper, DNA, in Mumbai to challenge the well-settled The Times of India. The competition was one of the biggest newspaper battles in Mumbai. Sustaining earlier losses, the newspaper eventually turned around. However, by October 2019, DNA was defunct and completely shut down.

In November 2019, Chandra had to resign as chairman of his company Zee Entertainment Enterprises, as per the SEBI Listing Regulations. However, he still continues as a non-executive director of the company.

In his autobiography ‘The Z Factor: My Journey as the Wrong Man at the right time’, Chandra has written about his association with the Rashtriya Swayamsevak Sangh, the ideological parent of the BJP, in his younger days. Chandra claimed the support of Bharatiya Janata Party (BJP) legislators and said he had others across party lines.

In May 2020, Essel Group defaulted ₹616 Crore secured NCD Bonds with a standstill agreement along with Subhash Chandra Personal Guarantee thus affecting 3,00,000 investors.

In August 2020, Zee Entertainment Enterprises Ltd (ZEEL) appointed promoter Subhash Chandra as chairman emeritus, following his resignation as non-executive director of the firm. Subhash Chandra, who was previously chairman, would now continue to be associated with the business in an honorary fashion.

Following the Essel Group’s debt crisis, Chandra oversaw the sale of several group assets and reduction of promoter holdings to repay lenders, while remaining chairman of the Essel Group and chairman emeritus of Zee Entertainment Enterprises.

== Financial challenges ==
Beginning in 2018–19, the Essel Group experienced significant financial distress after a liquidity crisis left several group companies unable to refinance debt. To reduce borrowings, the group undertook a series of asset sales, including the sale of its controlling stake in Essel Propack (now EPL Ltd), divestment of businesses in financial services and mutual funds, and reduction of promoter shareholdings in Zee Entertainment Enterprises and Dish TV. Several Essel Group companies also faced defaults, regulatory scrutiny and insolvency proceedings during the subsequent years.

In 2024, personal insolvency proceedings were initiated against Chandra under the Insolvency and Bankruptcy Code in connection with personal guarantees he had provided for loans raised by Essel Group companies. In August 2026, the National Company Law Tribunal (NCLT) approved a creditor-backed repayment plan under which admitted claims of approximately ₹22,006 crore were settled for ₹6.5 crore, based on an assessment of Chandra’s personal assets and repayment capacity. The decision was approved by a majority of creditors, although some lenders, including HDFC Bank and LIC Housing Finance, announced plans to challenge the order before the National Company Law Appellate Tribunal (NCLAT).

== Awards ==
- Entrepreneur of the Year (Ernst & Young) [1998]
- Businessman of the Year (Business Standard) [1999]
- Enterprising CEO of the Year (International Brand Summit) [1999]
- Global Indian Entertainment Personality of the Year by FICCI [2004]
- Lifetime Achievement Award at the CASBAA Convention [2009]
- Honorary Doctorate of Business Administration by the University of East London (2013)
- Hall of Fame for continuing contribution to industry in Entrepreneur category at the INBA (2010)
- International Emmy Directorate Award (2011)
- Canada India Foundation, Chanchlani Global Indian Award

== See also ==
- Subhash Chandra–LIC Housing Finance loan fraud case
