= Sudhir Chaudhary =

Indian journalist

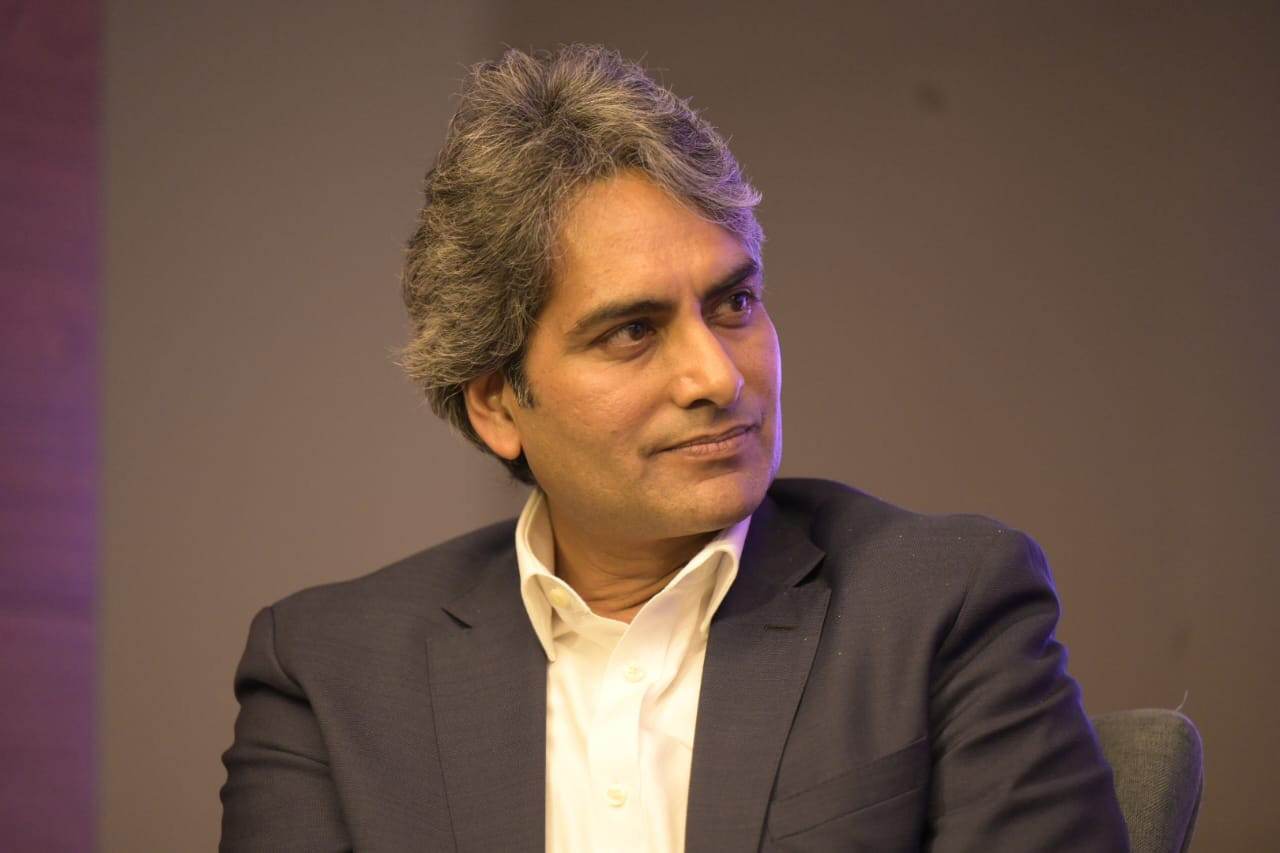
- Chaudhary in 2025
- Born: 18 June 1972 (age 54); Hodal, Haryana, India
- Occupations: Journalist; News anchor
- Years active: 1993–present
- Employer(s): Prasar Bharti; DD News
- Known for: Daily News & Analysis (DNA); Black & White (B & W); Decode
- Spouse: Niti Chaudhary
- Awards: Ramnath Goenka Excellence in Journalism Award, 2013

Sudhir Chaudhary is an Indian journalist working as Editor-in-chief of DD News, the Indian state-owned Hindi news channel and hosts the show Decode since May 2025. He was formerly consulting editor at the Aaj Tak and hosted the show Black & White (B & W) from 2022 until 2025.

He has also worked as editor-in-chief and CEO of Zee News, WION, Zee Business, and Zee 24 Taas and hosted the prime-time show Daily News & Analysis (DNA) on Zee News. Chaudhary left Aaj Tak on 4 April 2025 and joined DD News in the same month where he host a prime-time show named Decode which started on 15 May 2025.

== Career ==
Chaudhary has been working in the television news industry since the 1990s. He started his career at Zee News, then worked with Live India and Mi Marathi before joining Zee News again. He was in live television reporting and then 24-hour news television. Chaudhary was told to have been in the squad which covered the Vajpayee–Musharraf Indo-Pak meeting at Islamabad after the 2001 Indian Parliament attack.

In 2003, he left Zee News. He was instrumental in the launch of Sahara Samay, the Sahara group's Hindi-language news channel. He also joined India TV for a brief time. In 2012, he rejoined Zee News, hosting a Daily News & Analysis (DNA) news show.

Chaudhary resigned again from Zee News in July 2022 and joined Aaj Tak where he hosted Aaj Tak's prime-time show Black & White (B & W).

In August 2023, reports emerged claiming that Sudhir Chaudhary was leaving Aaj Tak and his show Black & White, but these were nothing more than rumors.

However, by February 2025 news surfaced that Chaudhary would be joining Prasar Bharati's DD News after leaving Aaj Tak. It was reported that Prasar Bharati had finalized a deal worth ₹15 crore with Chaudhary—a fact confirmed by several major news platforms. The issue was also raised in the Rajya Sabha by Sagarika Ghose of the AITC, who questioned and opposed the deal due to his former lawsuits allegations & biased reporting. According to Prasar Bharati sources, the deal with Chaudhary is intended to improve the credibility and TRP ratings of DD News.

In March 2025, the ₹15 crore deal of Prasar Bharati was finalised with Chaudhary, after which he left Aaj Tak and hosted the last episode of his prime-time show Black & White on 4 April 2025. He joined DD News the same month and started hosting his new prime-time show named Decode on 15 May 2025.

== Lawsuits ==
=== Jindal extortion case ===
In November 2012, Chaudhary and his colleague Sameer Ahluwalia were arrested on charges of extortion after businessman Naveen Jindal alleged that the two journalists had tried to extort ₹100 Crore worth of advertisements from his company in exchange for dropping stories that linked the Jindal Group with the Coalgate scam. The two were sent to 14-day judicial custody in Tihar Jail but were released on bail. The Broadcast Editors' Association suspended Chaudhary as its treasurer in the wake of these charges, saying that Chaudhary had acted in a manner prejudicial to the interests and objectives of the Association. In July 2018, the Jindal Group wrote to the investigating agencies saying that a settlement had been reached and requesting them to withdraw the allegations against the journalists and close the case; on the same day, charges of bribery were filed against Jindal and others related to the case.

=== Allegations against Mahua Moitra ===
Chaudhary accused Trinamool MP Mahua Moitra of plagiarizing American journalist Martin Longman, who pointed out the early signs of fascism in India; however, both Longman and Moitra later denied such accusations. Mahua Moitra filed a criminal defamation case against Sudhir Chaudhary, after which Chaudhary, on his daily prime time show, accepted that only a part of Mahua Moitra's speech was broadcast and showed his regrets. Zee Media also filed a defamation case against her for calling it 'chor' and 'paid' news.

=== Accusations of Islamophobia ===
On 10 April 2020, on Zee News, Chaudhary (according to Al Jazeera) openly accused Muslims of impeding India's coronavirus war. Chaudhary said on his show DNA that the "Tablighi Jamaat betrayed the nation."

In May 2020, Kerala Police filed a first information report against Chaudhary for his 11 March broadcast of DNA, in which Chaudhary discussed the "types of jihads," which were criticized as Islamophobic.

On 2 June 2023, he subtly blamed Muslims for destroying a temple in Uttar Pradesh's Bulandshahr. This later turned out to be false when the UP police arrested the four Hindu men in the case. After this, he said "Progressive Hindus" have "defamed their religion," and these are the "same progressive Hindus who like to be identified as secular."

In November 2023, the News Broadcasting & Digital Standards Authority (NBDSA) recently took action against two shows hosted by Sudhir Chaudhary, citing concerns about Islamophobia. The complaint emphasized the communal discourse in both shows, hosted by Chaudhary. One episode, aired in October 2022 as part of his 'Black and White' series, addressed the topic of "Muslim participation in Garba festivals." However, the content was criticized for its biased portrayal, manipulation of facts, and the use of a distinctly communal slur, reflecting an anti-Muslim bias. In another instance, Sudhir Chaudhary made unfounded claims about illegal mausoleums on government land in Uttarakhand during his role as anchor, thus stigmatizing the entire Muslim community. In response to these complaints, the NBDSA reprimanded the channel for the unnecessary and loose use of the term 'Mazhaar Jihaad' and ordered the removal of the video of one of the shows.

While targeting minorities again, he stirred debate on his show "Black and White" by declaring India the best cricket team globally, attributing success to no reservations in player selection. He advocated for a merit-based approach and questioned whether removing reservations across sectors would lead to greater national achievements. Social media backlash accused him of promoting divisive narratives against minorities and backward classes, urging a deeper understanding of the historical context of reservations for marginalized upliftment.

In March 2024, Aaj Tak, who broadcast his show, was again fined by NBDSA for misrepresenting Barack Obama's statement about protecting Muslim minorities in India by attributing it to the 'tukde tukde gang' and separatist and terrorist movements such as Khalistan, thus distorting viewers' perception of the matter.

In June 2024, Chaudhury had caught headlines for coining the term 'gaming jihad' by claiming that Hindu teenagers were being lured into converting into Islam by Muslims through interactions held in online gaming platforms like Twitch and Discord. Chaudhury also courted controversy by broadcasting a chart circulated among adherents of Hindu nationalism in social media platforms like Facebook and Reddit, titled 'Types of Jihad', detailing alleged attempts of Islamisation and elaborating Islamophobic tropes used by Hindu nationalists like 'population jihad' - claiming that polygamy, illegal infiltration of Muslims from abroad and greater fertility rates of Muslims compared to Hindus is a deliberate plan of Islamic overpopulation in the long run to outnumber Hindus in their own homeland, 'love jihad', an Islamophobic conspiracy theory claiming agenda of religious conversions into Islam through love marriage, 'history jihad', whitewashing persecution of Hindus and glorifying Islamic conquest of India in history books in the name of secularism, 'mazhar jihad', claiming that Muslims are gradually taking over the country's land by illegally encroaching over properties of Hindus, government bodies and public property through converting them into Islamic graves.

=== Threats ===
In 2015, Sudhir Chaudhary got X-category security after allegations that someone had threatened to murder Chaudhary. In 2020, Zee News claimed that China had been monitoring Sudhir Chaudhary.

== Awards ==
Chaudhary won a Ramnath Goenka Award for Excellence in Journalism in the "Hindi broadcast" category for 2013. He won the award for his interview with the friend of the Delhi December 16 gang-rape victim.
