= Rina Dhaka =

Indian fashion designer

Rina Dhaka is an Indian fashion designer.

== Early life ==
Dhaka was born in Chandigarh, and went to school at Carmel Convent School and then at the Government College for Girls, Chandigarh. After her family moved to Delhi, her father enrolled her in a fashion design course. When she was 18, she interned at garment exporter Intercraft. She started her fashion line at Rohit Khosla's atelier.

== Career ==
Dhaka started in the fashion industry in the 1980s as a model, and in the 1990s she designed churidar made from spandex. In 2009, she was part of a group of designers who created female beachwear, which was criticized as not being appropriate for use in India. In July 2010, she launched a collection inspired by cobwebs, promoted by Indian actress Lara Dutta. In 2012, Dhaka revamped menus and menu cards, uniforms, and store interiors for the Indian coffee shop chain Barista Lavazza. In 2018, Dhaka was a student mentor at the JD Institute of Fashion Technology. In 2019, she collaborated with a plus-size store, and launched a collection for maternity wear. In 2020, Dhaka collaborated with sustainable manufacturer LIVA for the collection Sustainable Romanticism. In 2021, Dhaka partnered with Ruma Devu to feature a tribal fashion show.

Dhaka's designs are distinguished by the use of both traditional and modern materials, with an increasing emphasis on sustainability, and on sustaining traditional craftwork skills.

Dhaka's designs have been worn by celebrities including Naomi Campbell, Uma Thurman and Lara Dutta, exhibited at The Louvre in Paris and the Metropolitan Museum of Art in New York City.

Dhaka has worked for an NGO in Delhi "ensuring ration is distributed."

Dhaka appears as herself in the Bollywood film Sandeep Aur Pinky Faraar. She is an advocate for sustainable development, and an ambassador for People for the Ethical Treatment of Animals (PETA) India, advocating for laws and governance against animal cruelty.

== Personal life ==
Dhaka has spoken publicly about her diagnosis with breast cancer in 2017, and her subsequent treatment and recovery.

She is a Buddhist.

== Awards ==
Dhaka won the Yuva Ratan award in 1993. In 2004, she won the designer choice award at Miami Fashion Week.

Dhaka received the Rajiv Gandhi excellence award in 2017. She unveiled the 'explorer spring summer' in 2018, where Bollywood actor Nidhhi Agerwal walked the ramp as the showstopper. In 2019, she was an honorary member of the Bharat conclave celebrating Mahatma Gandhi's 150th birthday in London.
