= Zee News =

News channel of Zee Media

- Logo used since 2025
- Country: India
- Broadcast area: International
- Headquarters: Noida, Uttar Pradesh, India

Programming
- Language: Hindi
- Picture format: 1080p HDTV

Ownership
- Owner: Essel Group
- Sister channels: Zee TV

History
- Launched: 27 August 1999; 27 years ago

Links
- Website: www.zeenews.com

Availability

Terrestrial
- Oqaab (Afghanistan): Channel 45

Streaming media
- Live Stream (International): live Web stream at Zee News

Zee News is an Indian Hindi-language right-wing news channel owned by Subhash Chandra's Essel Group. It launched on 27 August 1999 and is the flagship channel of the Zee Media Corporation.

The channel has been involved in several controversies and has broadcast fabricated news stories on multiple occasions. The channel has been subjected to an ongoing criminal defamation case against legislator Mahua Moitra as of March 2020.

== History ==
Zee Media Corporation Limited (formerly Zee News Ltd.) was founded by Essel Group and incorporated on 27 August 1999 as Zee Sports Ltd. It was a subsidiary of the Zee Telefilms Ltd (later renamed to Zee Entertainment Enterprises). The company was reincorporated on 27 May 2004 as Zee News Ltd. It was demerged as a separate company of the Essel Group in 2006. In 2013, Zee News Ltd changed its name to Zee Media Corporation Limited.

The chairman of the group is Subhash Chandra Goenka, who is a Bharatiya Janata Party-backed member of the Rajya Sabha. The channel itself is included by critics among "Godi media" news outlets who report favourably for the BJP and Narendra Modi.

=== Early years ===
The channel was established in 1993 as EL TV, which mainly broadcast in English and regional language. On 10 January 1998, it was renamed Zee India, as part of a restructuring of the Zee TV package, while becoming an all-news channel in the process. The entertainment programmes moved to the main Zee channel and the music output to Music Asia.

== Programming ==
Sudhir Chaudhary was the former editor-in-chief of Zee News and also the former anchor of the prime time show on the channel.

== Controversies ==
=== Cases of fabrication ===
==== Jawaharlal Nehru University sedition controversy ====
Zee News reported that students from the Democratic Students' Union (DSU) raised "anti-India" slogans such as Bharat ki barbadi (Destruction of India) and Pakistan Zindabad (Long live Pakistan) in an event on the Jawaharlal Nehru University campus. In a letter Vishwa Deepak, a journalist working at the channel gave a statement that "our biases made us hear Bhartiya Court Zindabad (Long live Indian courts) as Pakistan Zindabad." Vishwa Deepak later resigned from the channel after expressing reservations over its "biased coverage". The footage on the newscast of Zee News had formed the basis of charges filed by the Delhi Police. Sudhir Chaudhary, editor and prime time anchor of the channel however on a telecast made a statement saying "our channel only showed what was happening there, whatever we have shown is 100% authentic." A forensic report of the Delhi Police however later stated that the footage was doctored.

==== GPS chips in ₹2000 notes ====
Anchor Sudhir Chaudhary ran a Daily News and Analysis program announcing that the Indian 2000-rupee note issued after the 2016 Indian banknote demonetisation by the government have GPS chips which will allow the government to track currency, thereby reducing corruption. The Minister of Finance, Arun Jaitley dismissed the report as being rumours. The Reserve Bank of India has also given a statement that no such chips are present in the currency notes. The presence of "nano GPS" in the currency notes has been classified as a hoax being spread on social media.

==== Navjot Singh Sidhu – Alwar controversy ====
Zee News telecasted a video with the claim that the slogans of Pakistan Zindabad were raised at a rally in Alwar presided over by the Indian National Congress politician, Navjot Singh Sidhu. Sidhu accused Zee News of playing a doctored video and threatened to file a defamation suit against Zee News. Sidhu stated that slogans of Jo Bole So Nihal were misconstrued as being in favor of Pakistan. Zee News accused Sidhu of calling a news broadcast to be fake news sent a defamation notice to him. The noticed demanded an apology from him within 24 hours and threatened to pursue legal recourse if an apology was not issued by him.

==== Mahua Moitra criminal defamation case ====
Zee News telecasted a show featuring editor-in-chief Sudhir Chaudhary where he claimed that Trinamool Congress legislator Mahua Moitra had plagiarised author Martin Longman in her maiden speech after being elected to the Lok Sabha. Moitra accused the channel of false reporting and submitted a breach of privilege motion against Zee News and Sudhir Chaudhary. Martin Longman responded and stated that the legislator did not plagiarise him. Subsequently, Moitra filed a criminal defamation case against Chaudhary.

==== Spreading fake news during 2020–21 farmers' protests ====
In January 2021, during 2020–2021 Indian farmers' protest, Zee News aired a video of decorated tractors, claiming that it was evidence of a forthcoming protest by farmers, and commenting, "Why use such tractors of terror in the farmer protests? Are these tractors a means of waging war with the law? Are these farmers' tractors or terror tractors?" The video in question contained persons speaking in German and was confirmed as having been taken from a rally conducted in Germany in December 2020, in which tractors were decorated, and displayed to raise funds for children who were being treated for cancer.

=== Coverage of 2020 Delhi election results ===
The 2020 Delhi Legislative Assembly election were held on 8 February 2020. The exit poll results predicted the Aam Aadmi Party to retain their government in National capital territory of Delhi. The Zee News telecast of the exit poll results featured Sudhir Chaudhary who indulged in polemic commentary against the voters of the election. He stated that the people of Delhi had chosen Pakistan over Hindustan and that the rule of Mughals will now return. He further alleged that, the people of Delhi are lazy and only concerned about "freebies" and that issues like Ram Mandir, the Balakot airstrike and the revocation of Article 370 do not matter to them which is why they have rejected the Bharatiya Janata Party. The telecast resulted in backlash and mockery of Zee News and Sudhir Chaudhary on social media.

=== Misinformation during Ramadan 2025 ===
In March 2025, Zee News and anchor Malhotra Malika were criticized for spreading misinformation about a Kashmiri man offering Zuhur prayers atop a vehicle in India-administered Kashmir. The channel falsely claimed he had blocked traffic on the Srinagar–Jammu highway, but reports clarified that the actual cause was a landslide. Social media users accused Zee News of fueling communal tensions and demanded legal action.

=== Jindal Group incident ===
The channel was tried for allegedly extorting ₹1 billion from the Jindal Group revealed through a sting operation. Two senior journalists Sudhir Chaudhary and Sameer Ahluwalia were arrested. The two were sent to 14-day judicial custody in Tihar jail and were ultimately released on bail.

Naveen Jindal had accused the two journalists of trying to extort ₹1,000,000,000 (equivalent to ₹2.2 billion or US$24 million in 2026) in advertisements for Zee News from him through blackmail by threatening to air stories against his company in the Coalgate scam.

Zee News denied the charges and made counter claims of Jindal offering them ₹200,000,000 (equivalent to ₹450 million or US$4.8 million in 2026) to halt their investigations against Jindal Steel's involvement in the scam but filed no charges.

In July 2018, the Jindal Group withdrew the case against Zee News and both parties to the litigation stated that an out of court settlement had been reached which remains undisclosed.

=== Ban in Nepal ===
On 9 July 2020, Nepal's satellite and cable television operators banned Zee News and some other Indian privately owned news channels, citing "propaganda and defamatory report against Nepal government".

=== Notices by the News Broadcasting and Digital Standards Authority ===
In June 2022, the News Broadcasting and Digital Standards Authority said Zee News' headlines on Umar Khalid 'gave an impression that the accused had already been declared guilty' and asked them to take down the segments. In the same month, the News Broadcasting and Digital Standards Authority directed Zee News to take down a debate show from its website and social media handles about Muslim population for violating the regulator's code of ethics, saying it was "telecast without any data or substantial material to support it". Further, the news regulator said that the manner in which the topic was framed and language used, it was clear that there was an agenda behind the debate.

== See also ==
- Sudarshan News
- Zee Media Corporation
