= EsselWorld =

Amusement park in Mumbai

Coordinates: 19.232°N 72.806°E

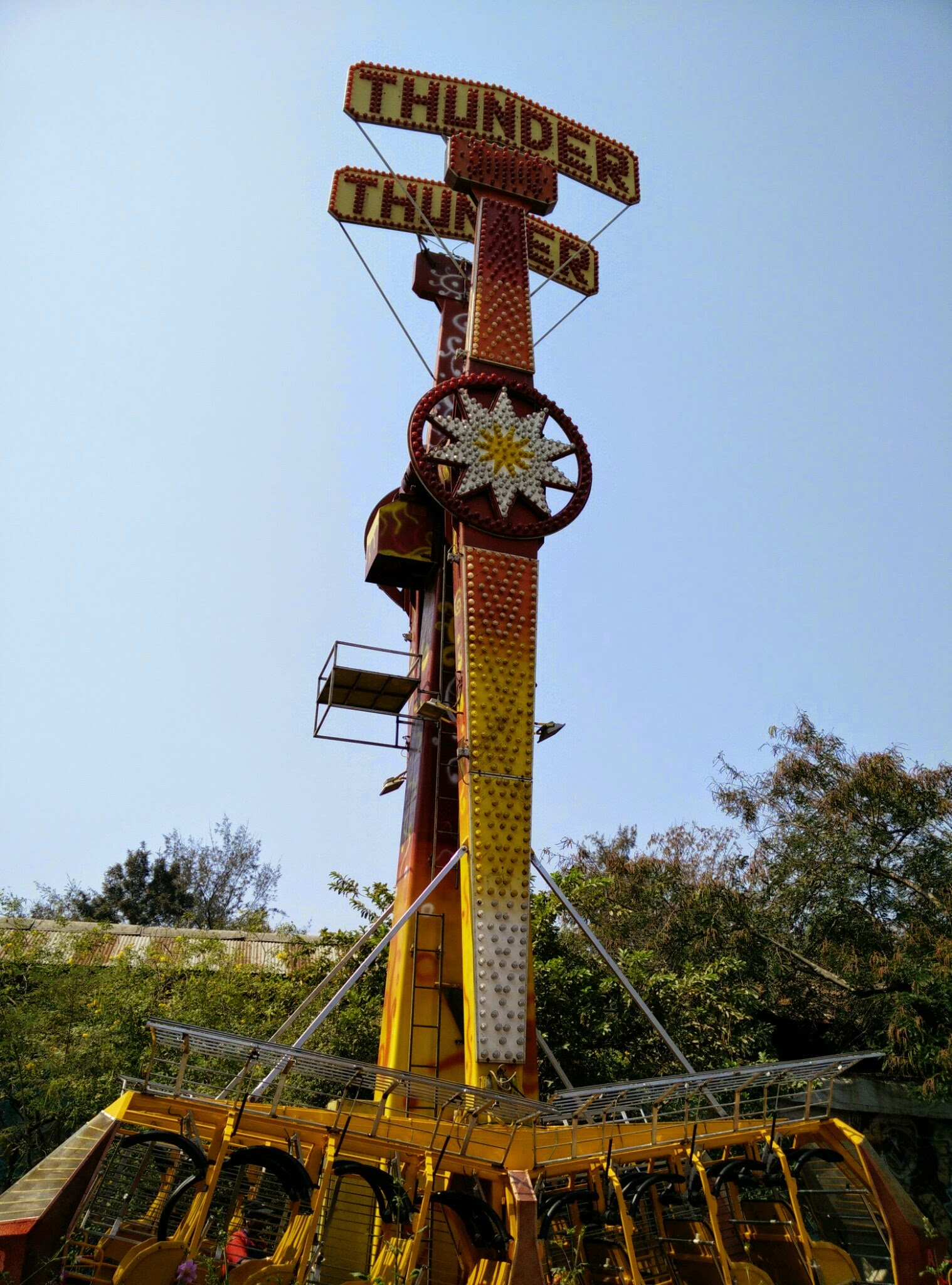

- Location within Mumbai Location within Maharashtra Location within India
- Status: Defunct
- Operating season: Year-round

EsselWorld was an amusement park located in Gorai on Dharavi island, Mumbai. It was operated by Pan India Pariyatan Ltd. It covered an area of 26 hectares (65 acres) along with its sister park Water Kingdom, a water park, and opened to the public in 1989. The park was one of the largest amusement parks in India. The park has been closed since April 2022.

EsselWorld had been involved in multiple controversies. The original land acquisition for 2.8 square kilometres (700 acres) was mired in controversy and was claimed to be illegal. Additionally, there have been allegations of illegal destruction of mangroves and violation of coastal zone regulations.

The park's catchphrase is "EsselWorld me rahunga mein, ghar nahi jaunga mein ", which means "I will stay in EsselWorld and do not want to go home".
