= Mirchi Music Awards South =

- Awarded for: Best in music
- Country: India
- Presented by: Radio Mirchi
- First award: 2009
- Website: http://www.radiomirchi.com/mma2009/telugu/index.html

Mirchi Music Awards South are awards presented by Radio Mirchi to honour both artistic and technical excellence in the South Indian music industry. The awards are separately given for Tamil, Telugu, Malayalam and Kannada languages. The broadcast partners were Star's Kannada offering Suvarna TV, Star's Tamil channel Vijay TV, Zee Telugu & ETV, Star's Malayalam channel Asianet plus.

== Ceremonies ==
Ceremony	Date	Host(s)	Venue
1st Mirchi Music Awards South 2009	17 July 2010	Shiva and Venkat Prabhu	Nehru Indoor Stadium, Chennai
2nd Mirchi Music Awards South 2010	26 July 2011	Shiva and Pooja	Nehru Indoor Stadium, Chennai
3rd Mirchi Music Awards South 2011	4 August 2012	Pradeep Machiraju and Suma Kanakala	Hyderabad
4th Mirchi Music Awards South 2012	26 July 2013		Chennai Trade Centre, Chennai
5th Mirchi Music Awards South 2013	16 August 2014		Annapurna Studios, Hyderabad
6th Mirchi Music Awards South 2014	22 July 2015	Pradeep Machiraju and Rashmi Gautam	JRC Conventions, Hyderabad
7th Mirchi Music Awards South 2015	27 July 2016		JRC Conventions, Hyderabad
8th Mirchi Music Awards South 2016	3 September 2017		Hyderabad
9th Mirchi Music Awards South 2017	24 September 2018		Hyderabad
10th Mirchi Music Awards South 2018–2019	February 2020	Priyanka Deshpande	Chennai
11th Mirchi Music Awards South Decade Best	12 March 2021	Priyanka Deshpande	Chennai
12th Mirchi Music Awards South 2020–2021	20 March 2022	Priyanka Deshpande	Prasad Studios, Chennai

== Trophy ==
The accolade given to the winners of the Southern Industry is the same as given to the Bollywood awardees. It portrays a human partially folding his knee and leaving his hands free. The winners of "Upcoming category" receive a Certificate of Merit and not a trophy.

== Jury ==
There will be two set of juries to decide the awards - a screening jury to short list the entries and a Grand Jury, with whom rests the task of finalizing the winners for each award. The entire process of screening, shortlisting and selecting the winners is audited by Ernst & Young. Each of the four south Indian languages will have separate jury panels headed by a chairman. The jury and chairman for each language for both years are as follows.

=== Tamil ===
The jury chairman for both years was Gangai Amaren. In 2009 the jury members were: Sudha Raghunathan, Arivumathi, S. Ve. Shekher, A. S. Lakshmi Narayanan, Bharadwaja, James Vasanthan, Malaysia Vasudevan (Late), Lingusamy, Na. Muthukumar, S. A. Rajkumar. In 2010, most of the jury members were changed except for Sudha Raghunathan and Arivumathi. They were: Malathy Lakshman, Snehan, Vijay Antony, A. L. Vijay, Vetrimaran, Pushpavanam Kuppusamy, Vasanth, Manicka Vinayagam, and Sabesh.

=== Telugu ===
The chairman for the jury for both years was D. Suresh Babu. For 2009 the jury members were: Anantha Sreeram, Amma Rajasekhar, Chakri, Chandrabaose, Tanikella Bharani, Koti, Devi Sri Prasad, Ramana Gogula, K. K. Senthil Kumar, Sunitha Upadrashta. In 2010, except for Chandrabose, Saluri Koteswara Rao and Sunitha, all the others were changed. The jury members for 2010 were: Ramana Gogula, Patnaik, Ramajogayya Sastry, K. M. Radha Krishnan, V. Madhusudhana Rao, Marthand K. Venkatesh, Hasam Raja, Raju. For 2021, Tanikella Bharani, Bhaskarabhatla, Jeevitha, D. Suresh Babu, Raghu Kunche, R. P. Patnaik, Madhura Sreedhar Reddy, Kousalya, M. M. Srilekha, Kalyan Koduri and Haasam Raja.

=== Kannada ===
The chairman of the jury for both years was Hamsalekha. For 2009 the other jury members were: V. Harikrishna, Gurukiran, Mano Murthy, Manjula Gururaj, Raghu Dixit, Rajesh Krishnan, Nagathihalli Chandrashekhar, Yograj Bhat. In 2010, Mano Murthy, Raghu Dixit and Yograj Bhat were replaced by Raghavendra Rajkumar, V. Manohar, and Raghavendra Rajkumar.

=== Malayalam ===
The chairman of the jury for both years was Kaithapram Damodaran Namboothiri. The other jury members for 2009 were: Aashiq Abu, Anil Panachooran, K. S. Chitra, Deepak Dev, Jassie Gift, Jency Anthony, Johnson Master, M. Jayachandran, Raghu Kumar, and Sibi Malayil. In 2010 Anil Panachooran, K. S. Chitra, and Deepak Dev were replaced by Vayalar Sarath Chandra Varma and Arundathi

== Award categories ==
The event honours the awardees under 17 broad categories in Tamil. It honours the Telugu, Malayalam and Kannada winners under 15 broad categories. Mannin Kural - Male/Female is awarded only for the Tamil Music Industry. In 2009, Critica Choice Best Song - Song/Album were given. These categories were removed in 2010 and only 15 categories were awarded for the Telugu, Kannada and Malayalam music industry, and 17 categories for the Tamil music industry.

== Jury awards ==
=== Best Upcoming Lyricist ===
2009

Language	Recipient	Song	Film	Photo
Tamil	Karthik Neetha	Pada Pada	Vennila Kabadi Kuzhu
Telugu	Balaji	Upenentha	Aarya 2
Kannada	Sudhir Attavar (tie)	Marali Mareyagi	Savari
Kannada	A. P. Arjun (tie)	Yaare Nee Devatheya	Ambaari
Malayalam	Aparna Karimbil	Aarum Meettan	Paribhavam

2010

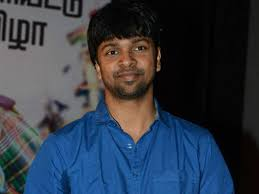
Language	Recipient	Song	Film	Photo
Tamil	Madhan Karky	Irumbile Oru Irudhaiyam	Endhiran
Telugu	Nigoti Sarath	Atmahathyalu oddura	Dhoom Dhaam
Kannada	Ghouse Peer	Ille Ille Yello	Chirru
Malayalam	Vinod Mankara	Pachilachartham	Karayilekku Oru Kadal Dooram

2011

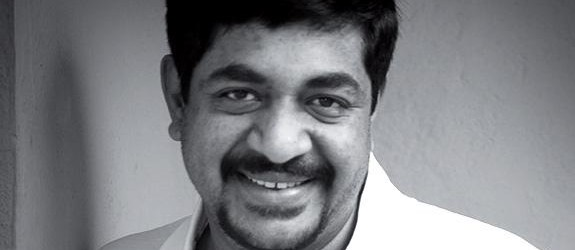
Language	Recipient	Song	Film	Photo
Tamil	Niranjan Bharathi	Nee Naan	Mankatha
Telugu	Sri Mani	Aho Baalu	100% Love
Kannada	Yogaraj Bhat	Hrudaya Jaaruthide	Lifeu Ishtene
Malayalam	Anoop Menon	Mazhaneer Thullikal	Beautiful

2012

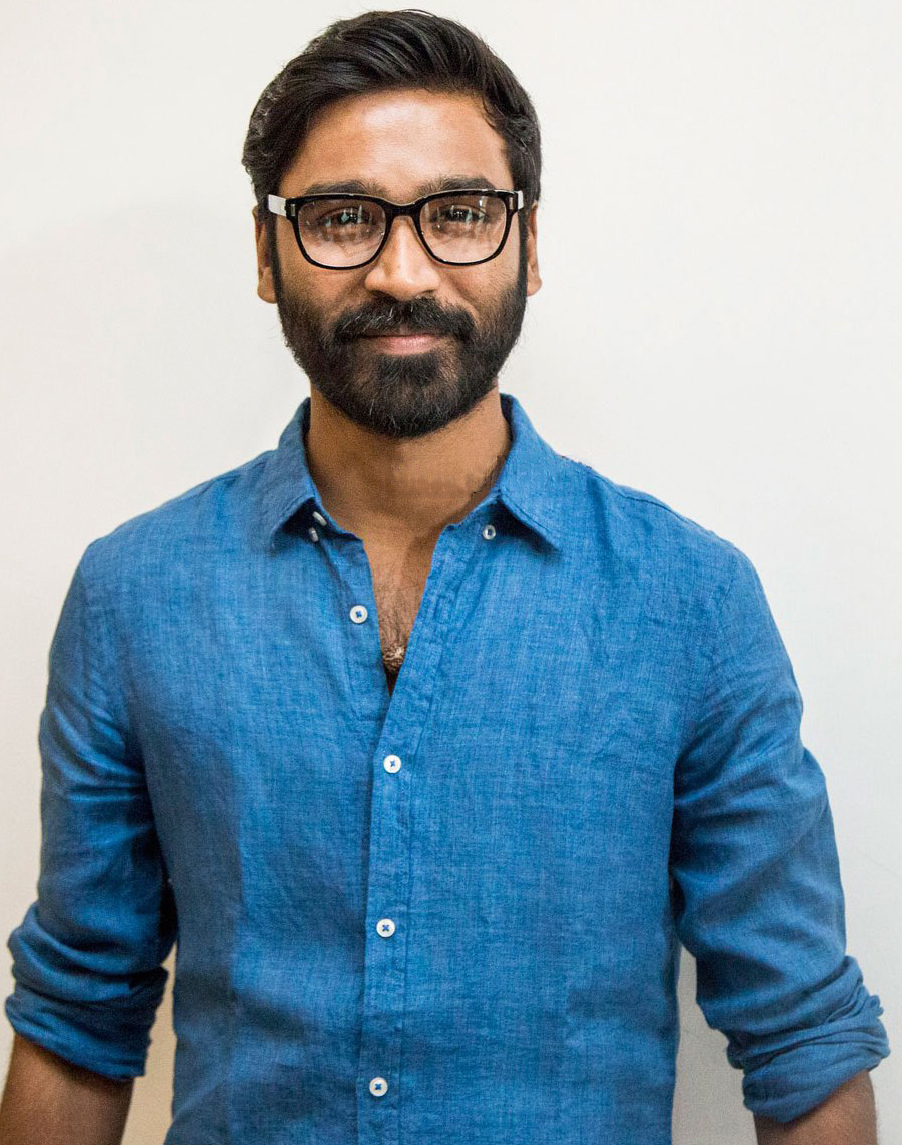
Language	Recipient	Song	Film	Photo
Tamil	Dhanush	Kannazhaga	3
Telugu	Rakendu Mouli	Manasu Palike	Andala Rakshasi
Kannada	Pawan Wadeyar	Namdukke Pyarge	Govindaya Namaha
Malayalam	Anu Elizabeth Jose	Muthuchippi Poloru	Thattathin Marayathu

2013

2014

2015

2016

Language	Recipient	Song	Film	Photo
Tamil
Telugu
Kannada
Malayalam	Meppalil Balan	Cherupathi	Kappirithuruthu

2017

2018

=== Best Upcoming Music Director ===
2009

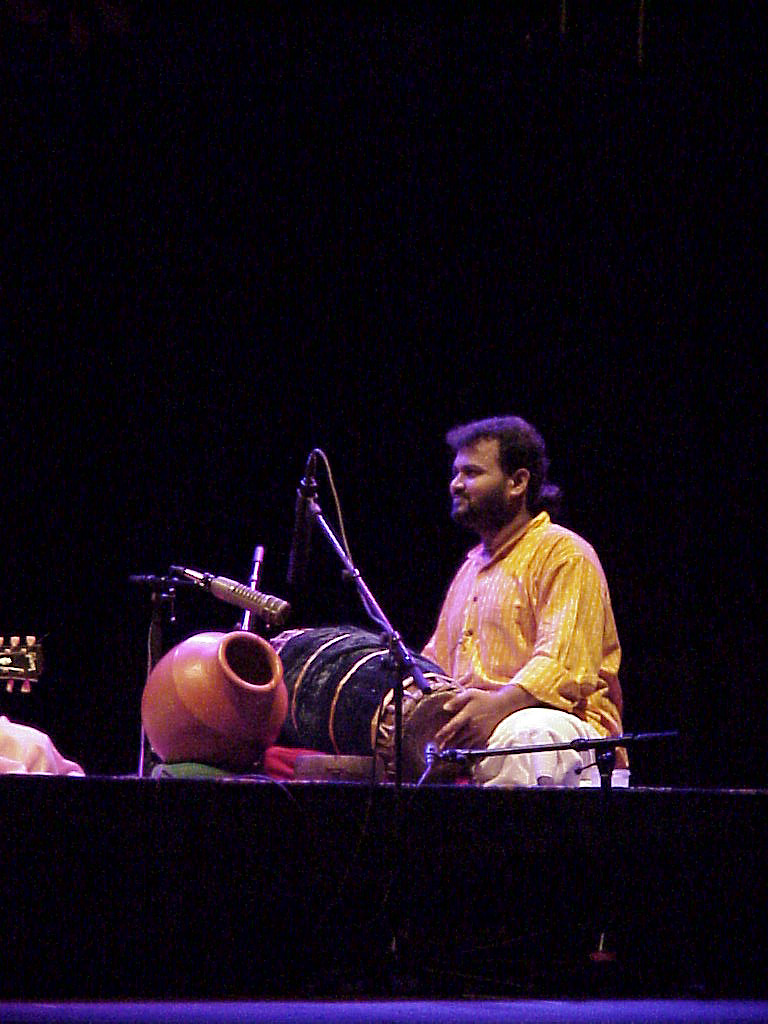
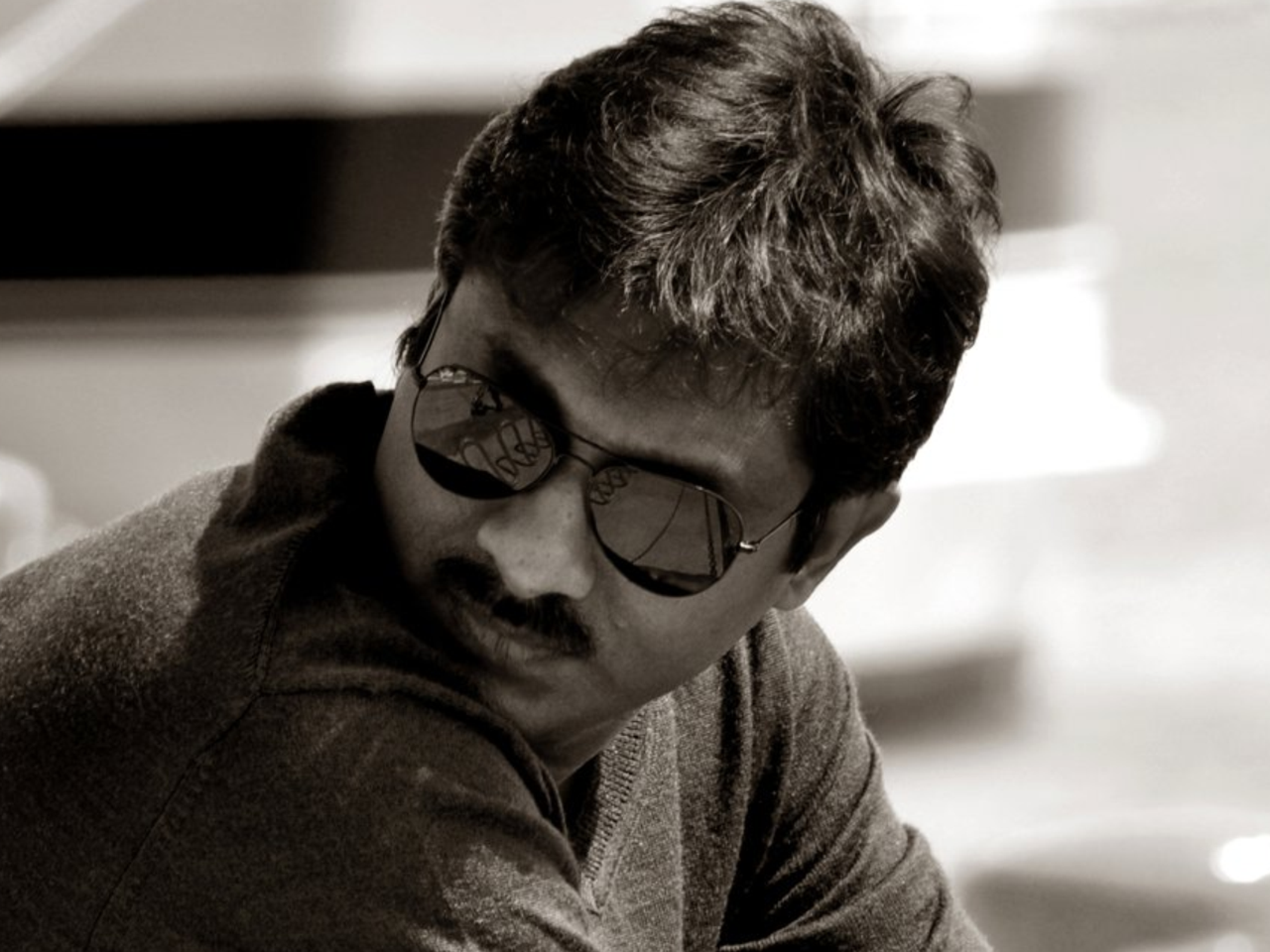
Language	Recipient	Song	Film	Photo
Tamil	Selvaganesh	Laesa Prakudhu	Vennila Kabadi Kuzhu
Telugu	Raghu Kunche	Ravanamma	Bumper Offer
Kannada	Veer Samarth	Ee Dina Hosadagide	Karanji
Malayalam	Afzal Yusuf	Chirakarnna Mounam	Calendar

2010

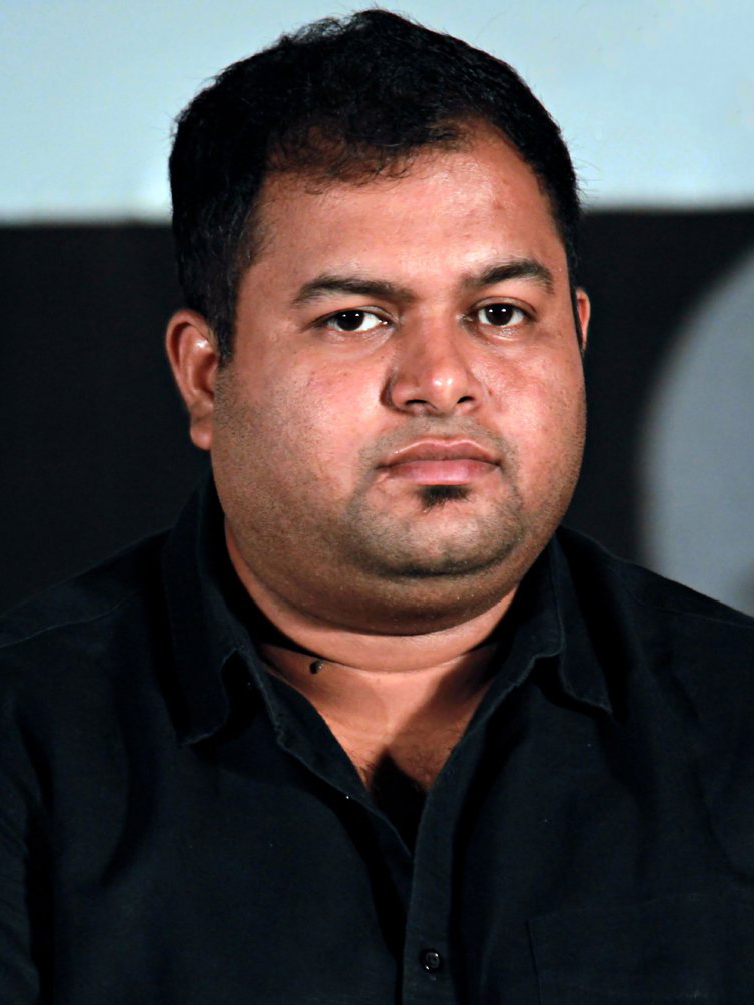
Language	Recipient	Song	Film	Photo
Tamil	Kannan	O Maha Zeeyan	Tamizh Padam
Telugu	S. S. Thaman	Nijemena	Brindavanam
Kannada	Giridhar Divan	Ille Ille Yello	Chirru
Malayalam	Suresh Manimala	Paattu Paduvan	Paattinte Palazhy

2011

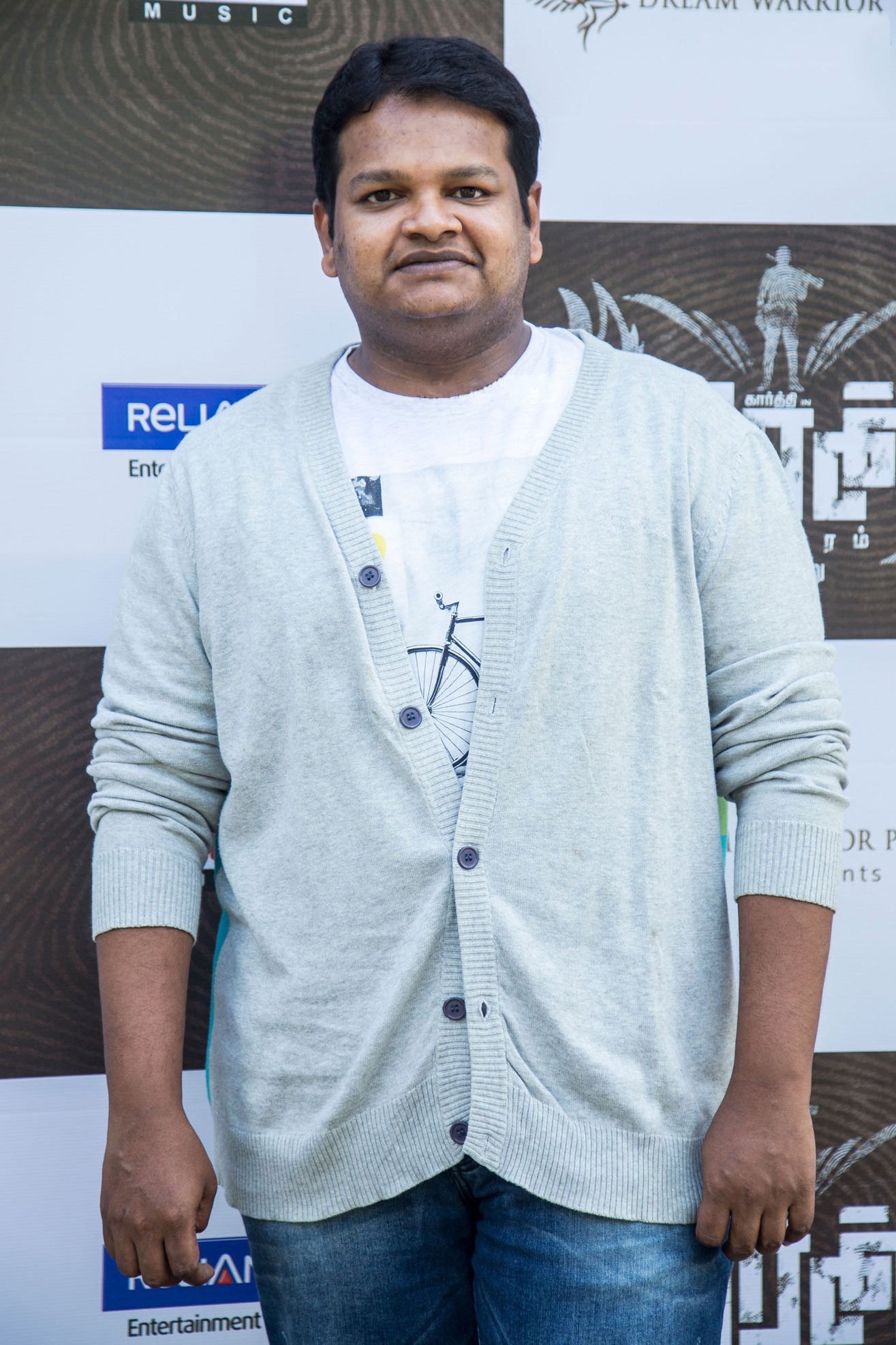
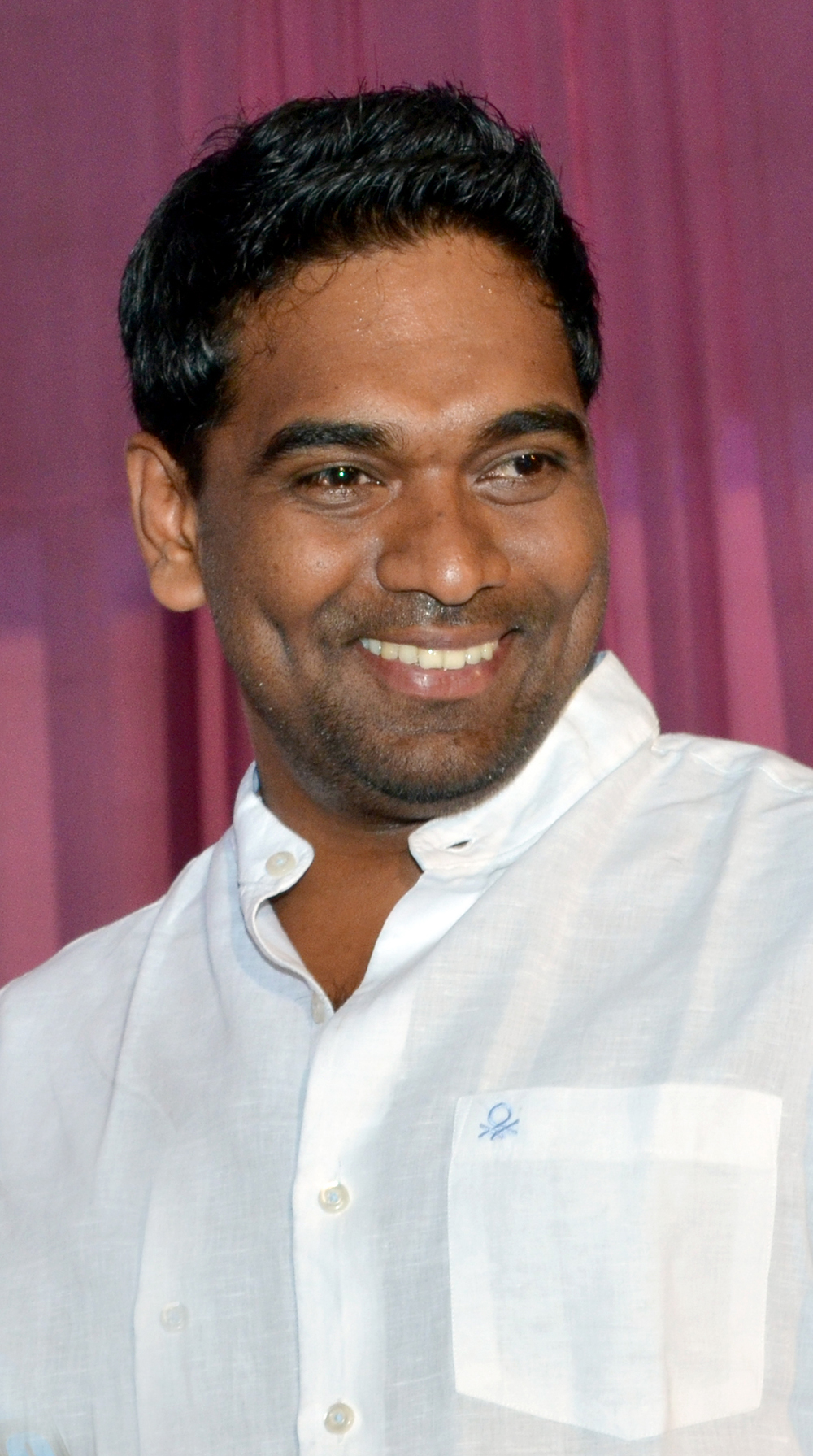
Language	Recipient	Song	Film	Photo
Tamil	M Ghibran	Sara Sara Saara Kathu	Vaagai Sooda Vaa
Telugu	Babu Shankar	Choosthunna	Mogudu
Kannada	Rony Raphael	Thaaja Thaaja	Gun
Malayalam	Ratheesh Vegha	Mazhaneer Thullikal	Beautiful

2012

Language	Recipient	Song	Film	Photo
Tamil	Karthik	Nila Nila	Aravaan
Telugu	Radhan	Manasu Palike	Andala Rakshasi
Kannada	Vasu Dixit & Abhilashlakra	Alisi Hridayada Haadanu	Cyber Yugadol Yuva Madhura Prema Kavyam
Malayalam	Arakkal Nandakumar	Neeyo Dhanya	Prabhuvinte Makkal

2016

Language	Recipient	Song	Film	Photo
Tamil
Telugu
Kannada
Malayalam	Sreeraj Sahajan	Minni Chinnum	Kolumittayi

=== Best Upcoming Male Singer ===
2009

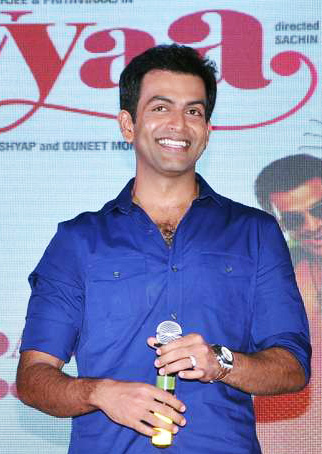
Language	Recipient	Song	Film	Photo
Tamil	Kaushik	Naatkal	Ninaithale Inikkum
Telugu	Sreeram Chandra	Arere Chejarinde	Boni
Kannada	Vikas Vasistha	Ee Dina Hosadagide	Karanji
Malayalam	Prithviraj Sukumaran	Kaane Kaane	Puthiya Mukham

2010

Language	Recipient	Song	Film	Photo
Tamil	Ajeesh	Idhu Varai	Goa
Telugu	Sooraj Santhosh	Inka Edhu	Darling
Kannada	M. L. R. Karthikeyan	Kangalu Kanavilae	Mathe Mungaru
Malayalam	Subin	Malayalipenne	Kaaryasthan

2011

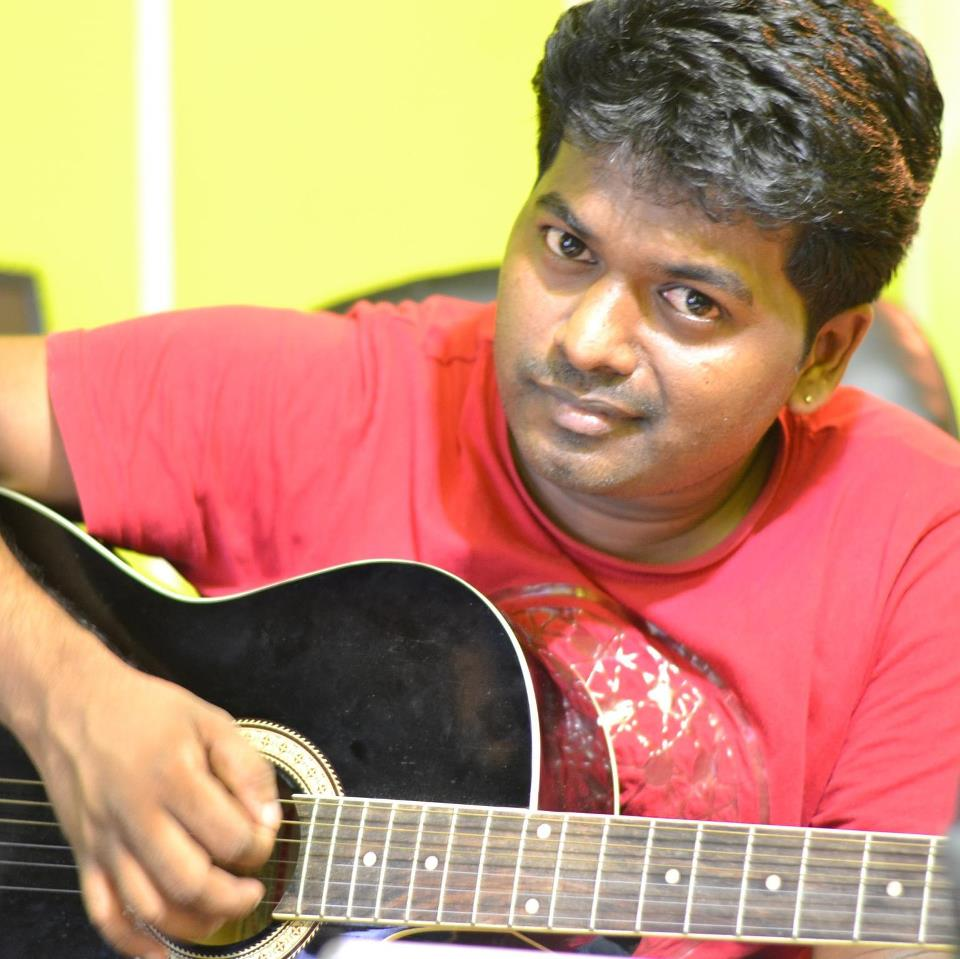
Language	Recipient	Song	Film	Photo
Tamil	Sathya	Masaamaa	Engaeyum Eppothum
Telugu	Dinker	Ninnala Lede	Its My Love Story
Kannada	Ishaan Dev	Shyloo	Shyloo
Malayalam	Nikhil Raj	Nattuvazhiyile	Rathinirvedam

2012

Language	Recipient	Song	Film	Photo
Tamil	Pradeep	Aasi Oru Pulveli	Attakathi
Telugu	Rakendu Mouli	Manasu Palike	Andala Rakshasi
Kannada	Harsha	Dhiraja	Alemari
Malayalam	Nivas	Nilamalare	Diamond Necklace

2016

Language	Recipient	Song	Film	Photo
Tamil
Telugu
Kannada
Malayalam	Sreeraj Sahajan	Minni Chinnum	Kolumittayi

=== Best Upcoming Female Singer ===
2009

Language	Recipient	Song	Film
Tamil	Janaki Iyer	Azagai Pookuthe	Ninaithale Inikkum
Telugu	Nikitha Nigam	Dheera Dheera	Maghadheera
Kannada	Ritisha Padmanabh	Naanu Manasare	Manasaare
Malayalam	Divya B Nair	Shinkara Kanna	Bharya Onnu Makkal Moonnu

2010

Language	Recipient	Song	Film
Tamil	Anweshaa	Megam Vandhu	Mandhira Punnagai
Telugu	Sravana Bhargavi	Simhamanti	Simhaa
Kannada	Lakshmi Nataraj	Omkara	Aptharakshaka
Malayalam	Gayathiri	Alapam	Nalla Paattukare

2011

Language	Recipient	Song	Film
Tamil	Baby Priyanka, Baby Srinisha, Baby Nithyashree	Oru Malayoram	Avan Ivan
Telugu	Ramya N.S.	Poovai Poovai	Dookudu
Kannada	Meghana	Bella Bellane Aa Seereyanna	Allide Nammane Illi Bande Summane
Malayalam	Riya Raju	Ninnedenikkulla	Dr. Love

2012

Language	Recipient	Song	Film
Tamil	Priya Himesh	Aathadi Manasudhan Female	Kazhugu
Telugu	Sayonara	Yededa Yededa	Genius
Kannada	Indu Nagaraj	Pyarge Aagbittaite	Govindaya Namaha
Malayalam	Abhirami	Azhalinte Azhangalil	Ayalum Njanum Thammil

2012

Language	Recipient	Song	Film
Tamil
Telugu
Kannada
Malayalam	Aparna Balamurali	Mounangal	Maheshinte Prathikaaram

=== Best Female Playback Singer ===
2009

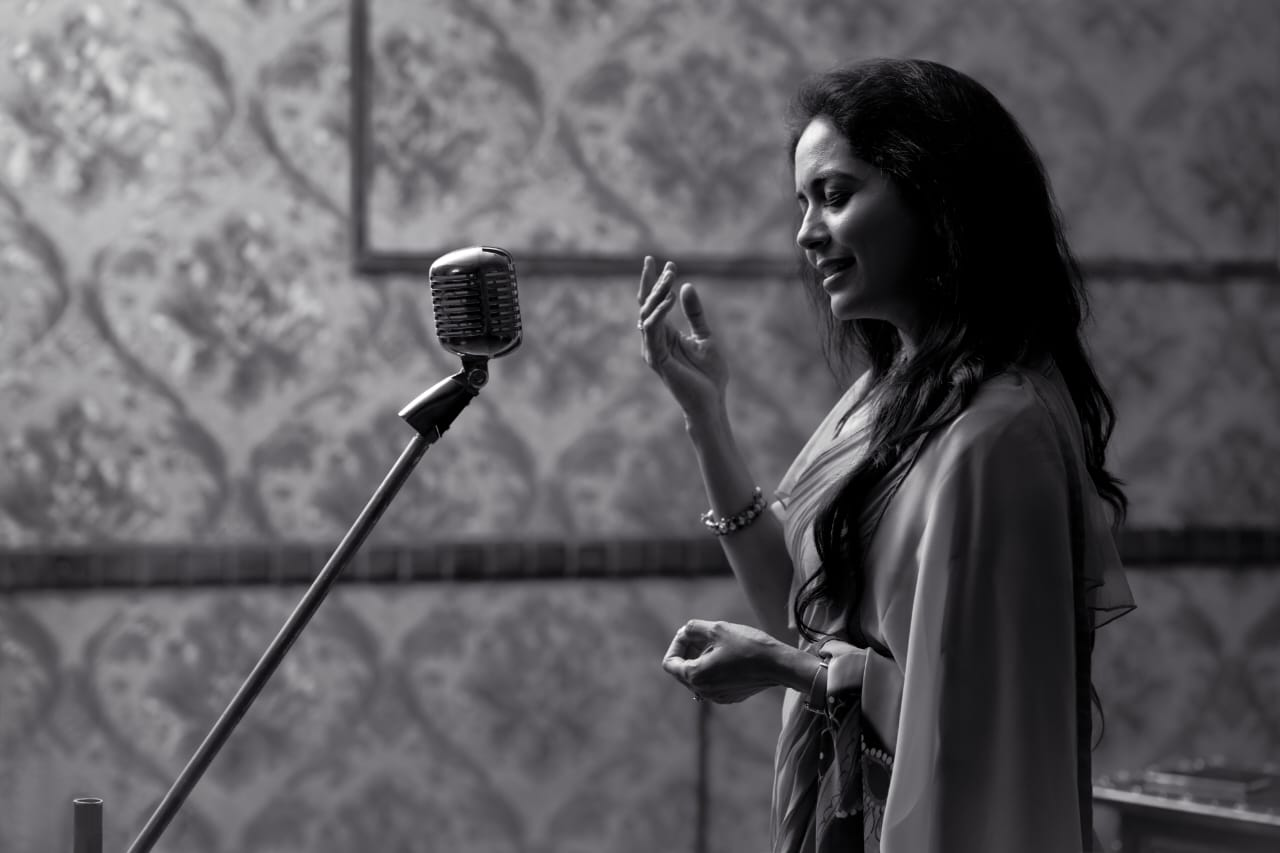
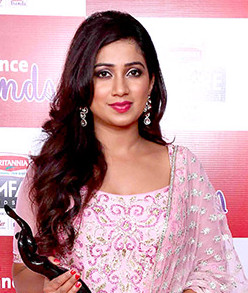
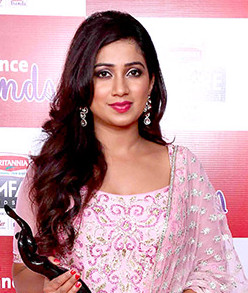
Language	Recipient	Song	Film	Photo
Tamil	Janaki Iyer	Azagai Pookuthe	Ninaithale Inikkum
Telugu	Sunitha Upadrashta	Hrudhayavedana	Aa Intlo
Kannada	Shreya Ghoshal	Na Naguva Modalene	Manasaare
Malayalam	Shreya Ghoshal	Chanthu Thottille	Banaras

2010

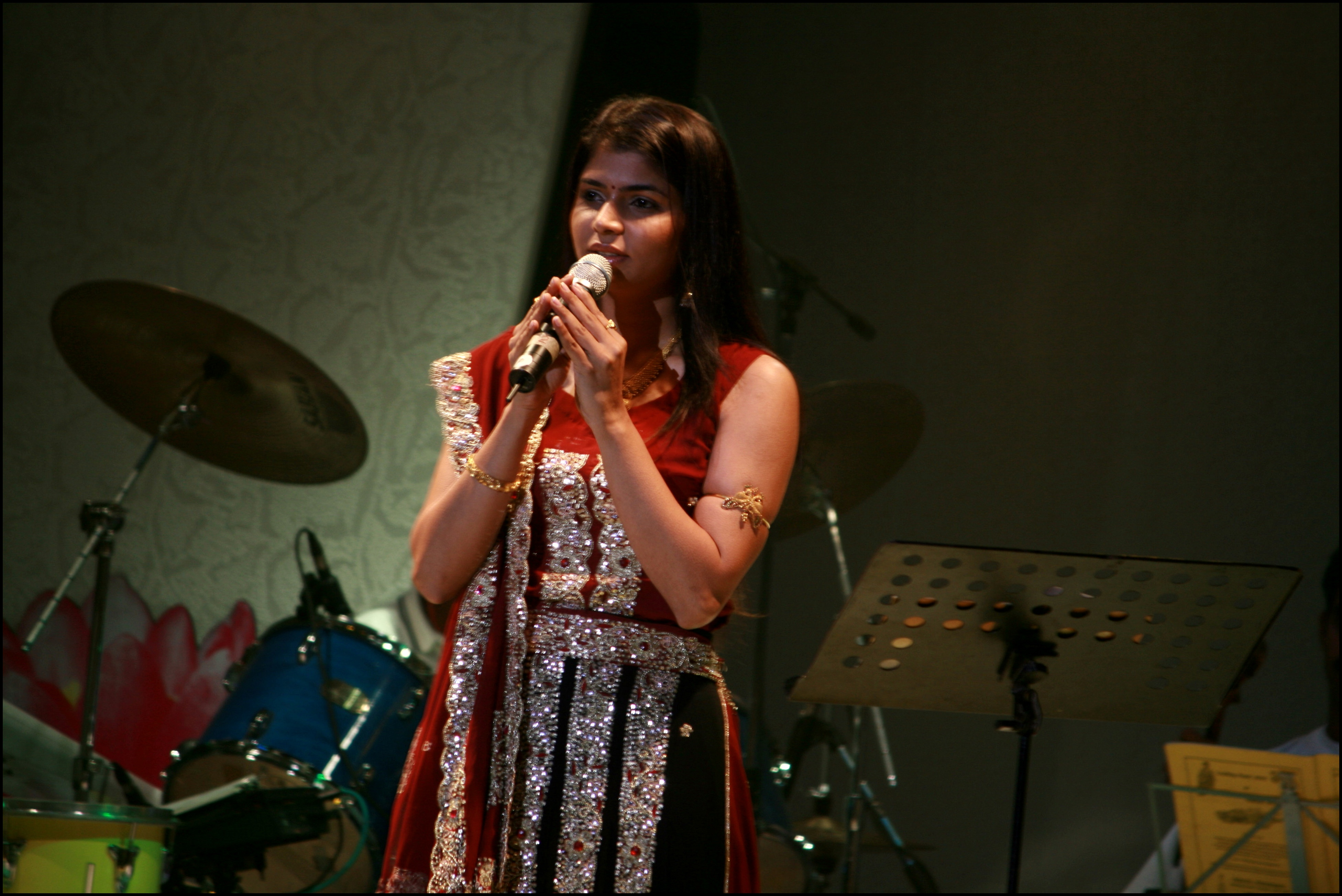
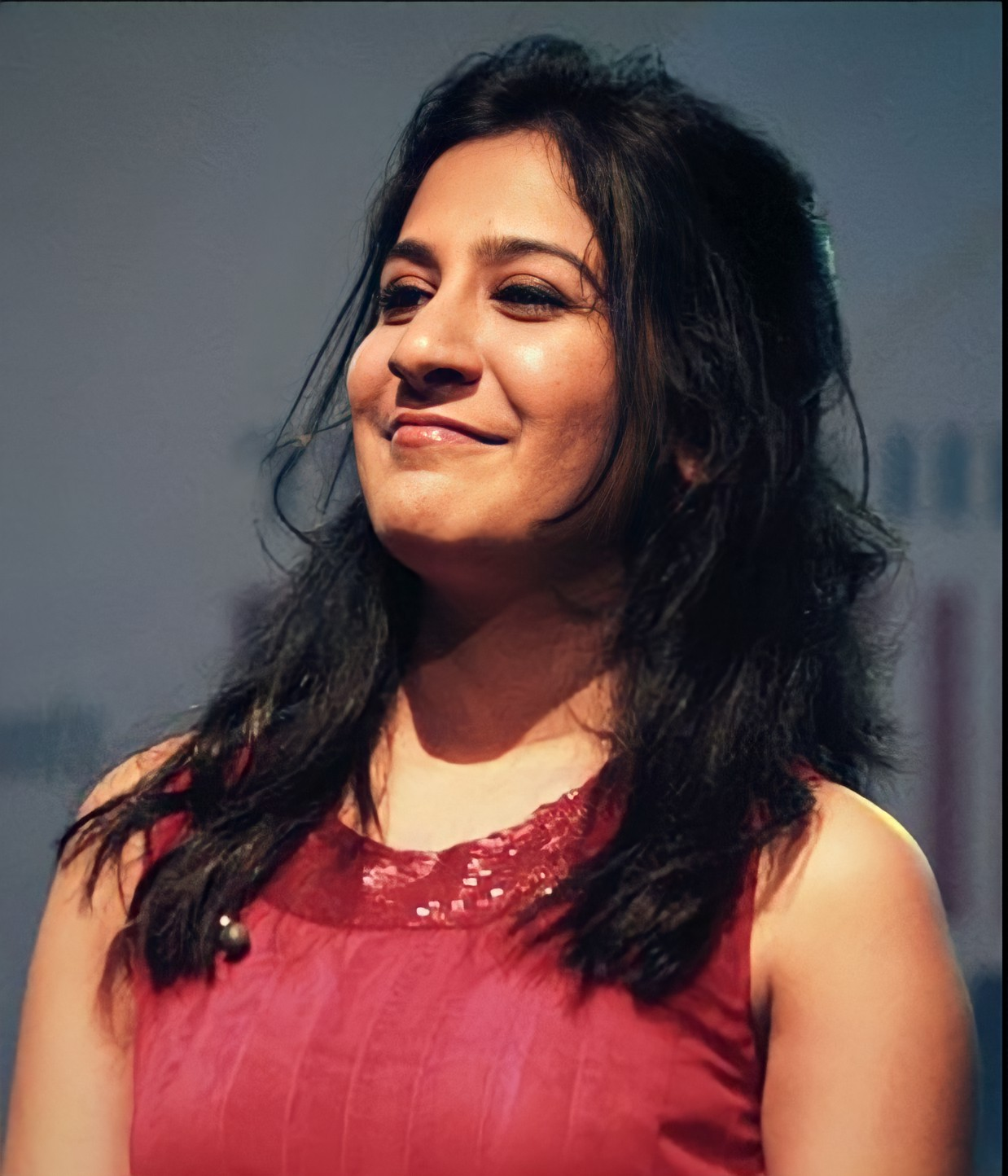
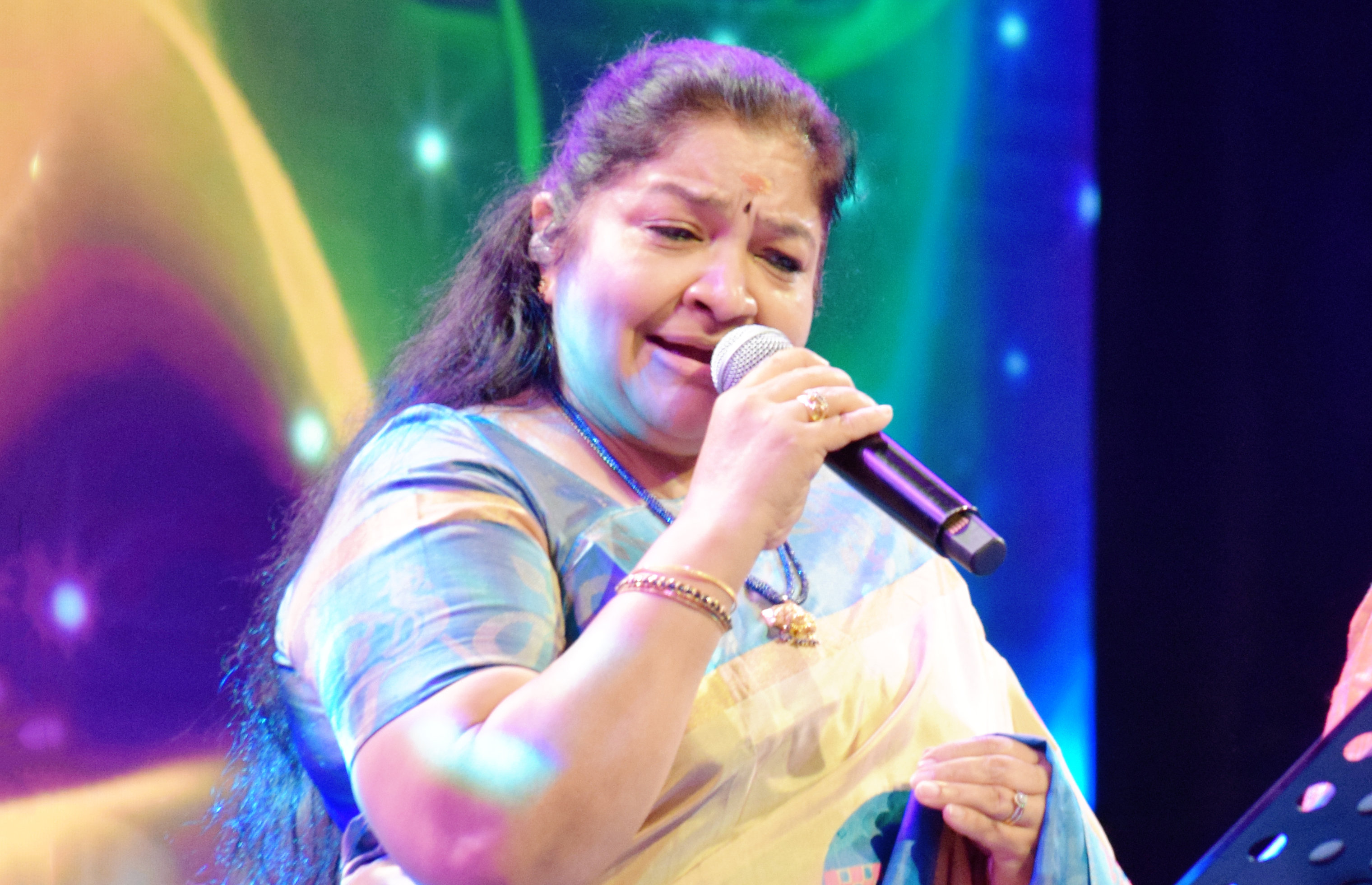
Language	Recipient	Song	Film	Photo
Tamil	Chinmayi	Kilimanjaro	Endhiran
Telugu	Swetha Mohan	Amma Thale	Komaram Puli
Kannada	Vidyashree	Hrudayave Bayaside	Krishnan Love Story
Malayalam	K. S. Chithra	Chithrasalabhame	Karayilekku Oru Kadal Dooram

2011

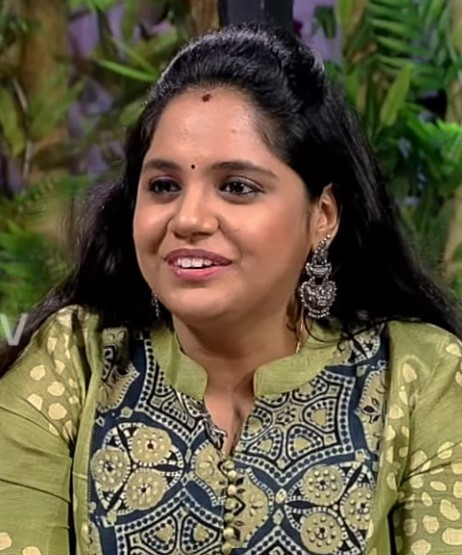
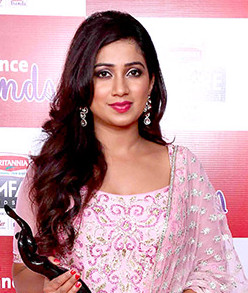
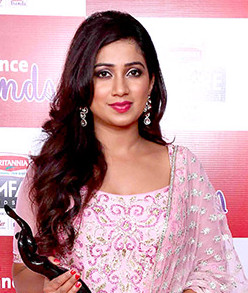
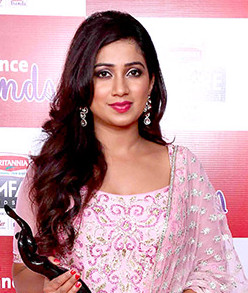
Language	Recipient	Song	Film	Photo
Tamil	Saindhavi	Pirai Thedum	Mayakkam Enna
Telugu	Shreya Ghoshal	Chali Chaliga	Mr. Perfect
Kannada	Shreya Ghoshal	Gaganave Baagi	Sanju Weds Geetha
Malayalam	Shreya Ghoshal	Paattil Ee Paattil	Pranayam

2012

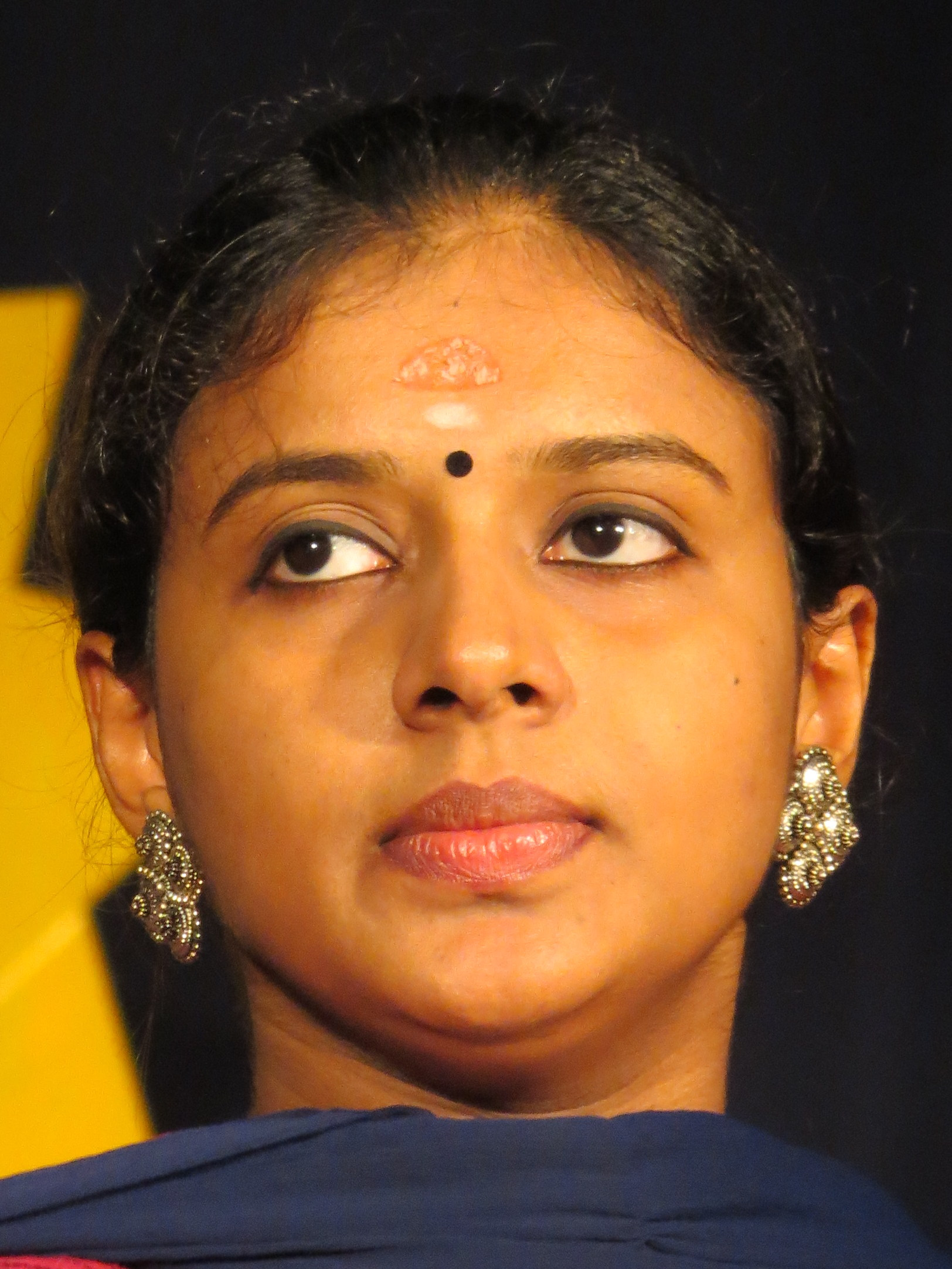
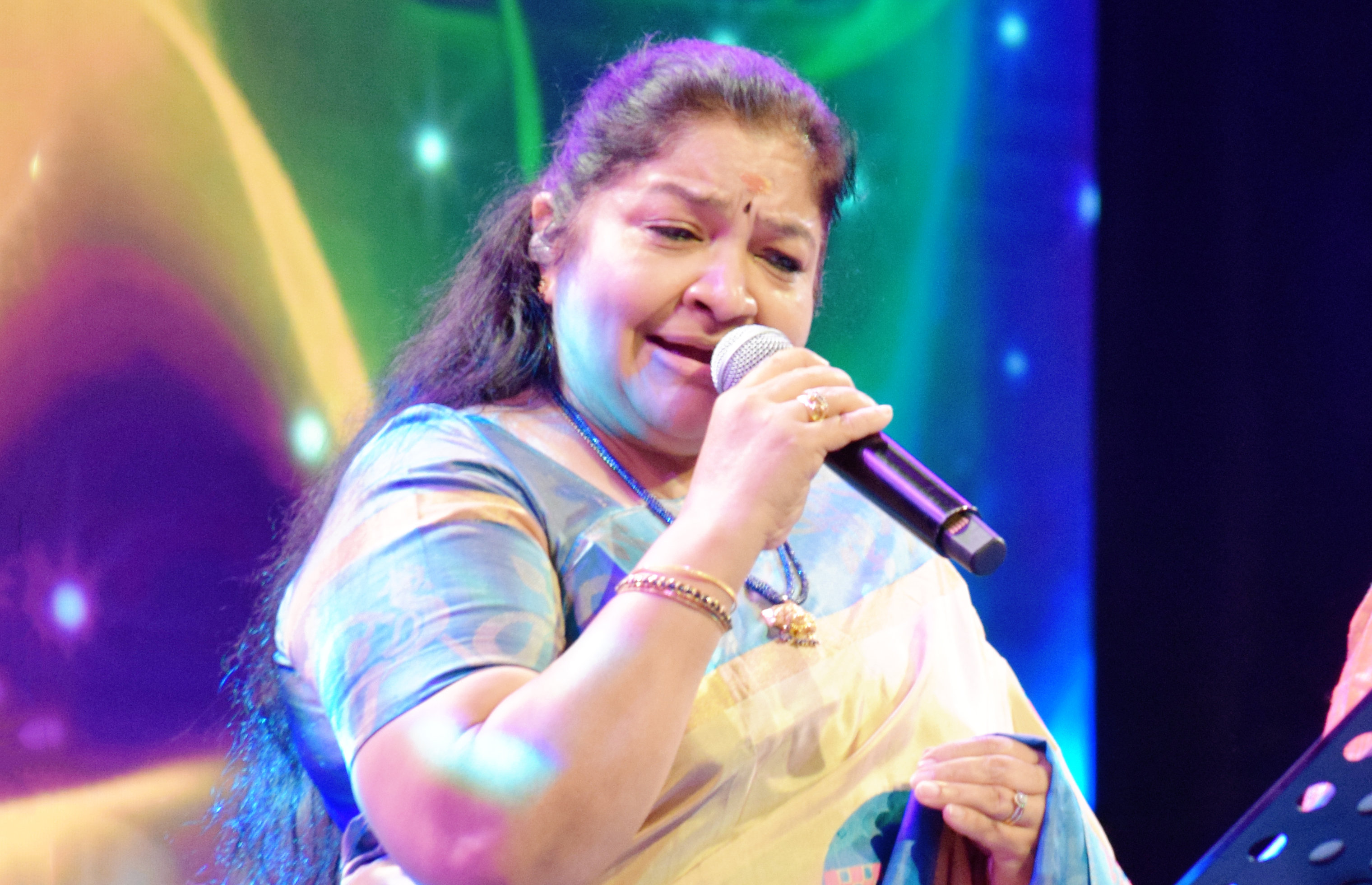
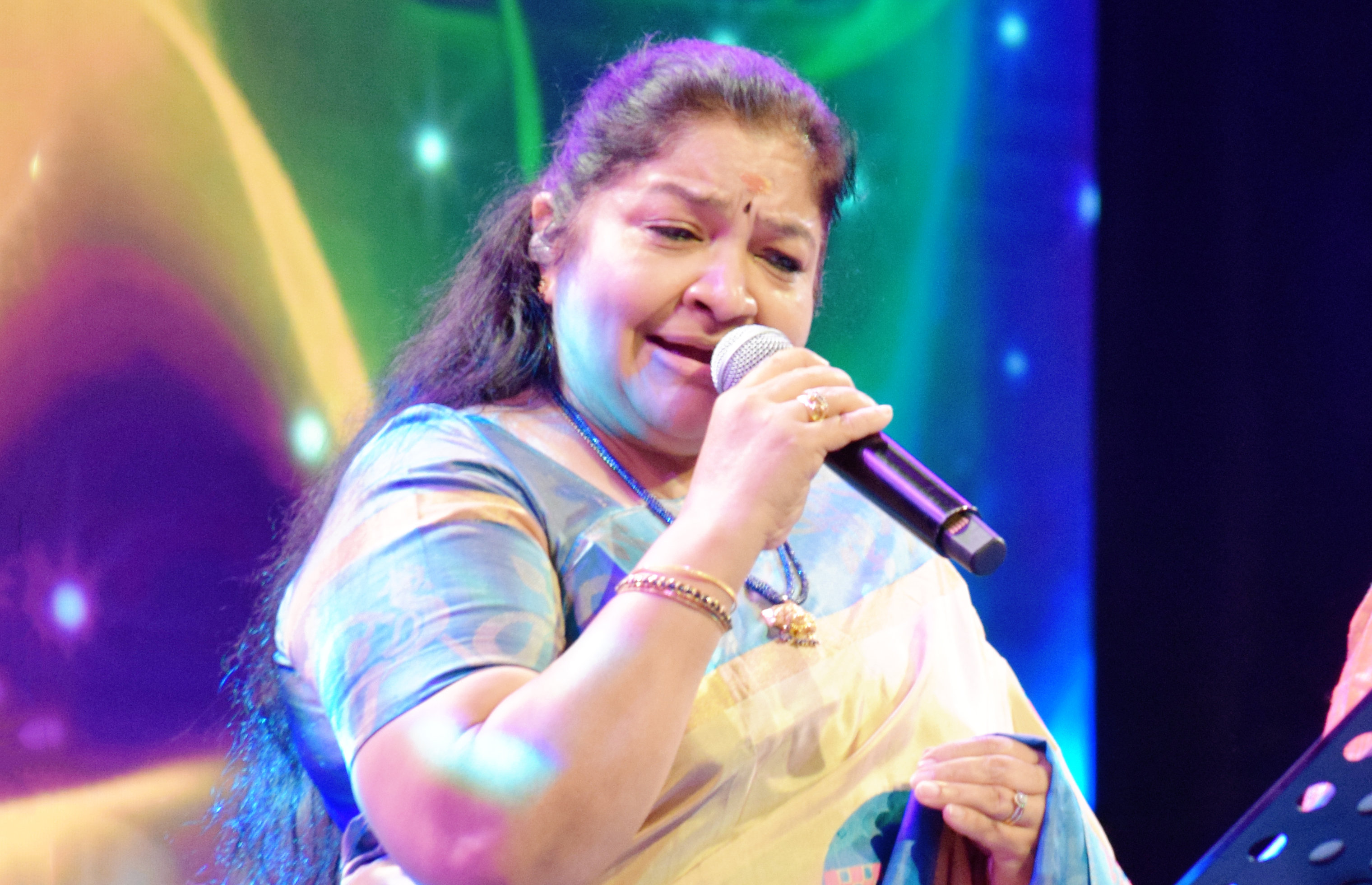
Language	Recipient	Song	Film	Photo
Tamil	Sithara	Kangal Neeye	Muppozhudhum Un Karpanaigal
Telugu	K. S. Chithra	Paluku Thelupu Thallive	Devasthanam
Kannada	Vani Harikrishna	Musanjeveleli	Addhuri
Malayalam	K. S. Chithra	Vishukili	Ivan Megharoopan

2013

2014

2015

2016

2017

2018

2019

=== Best Male Playback Singer ===
2009

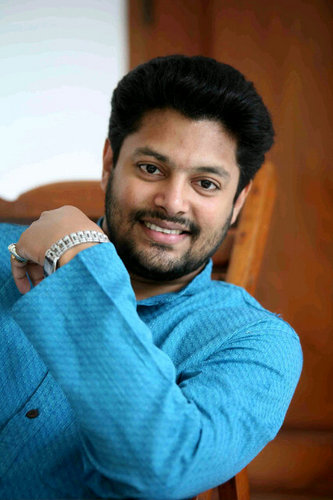
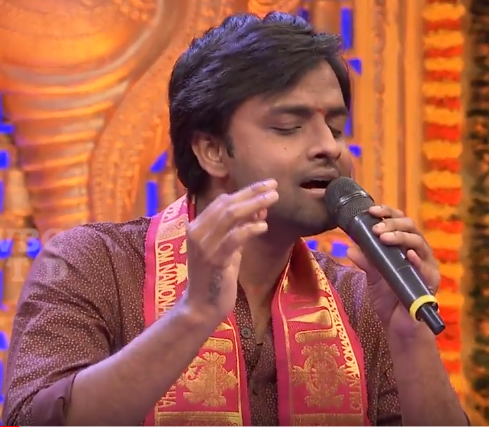
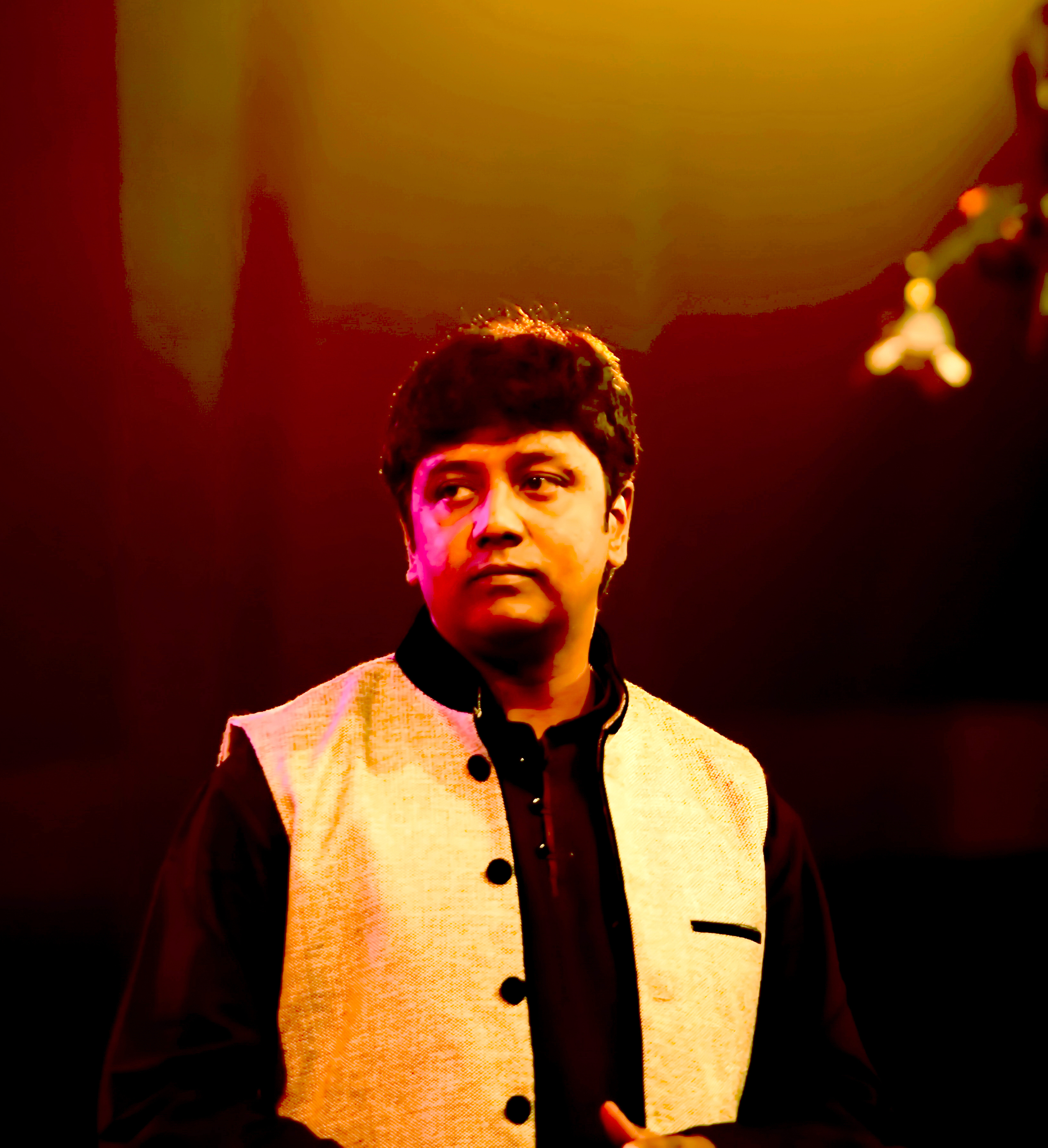
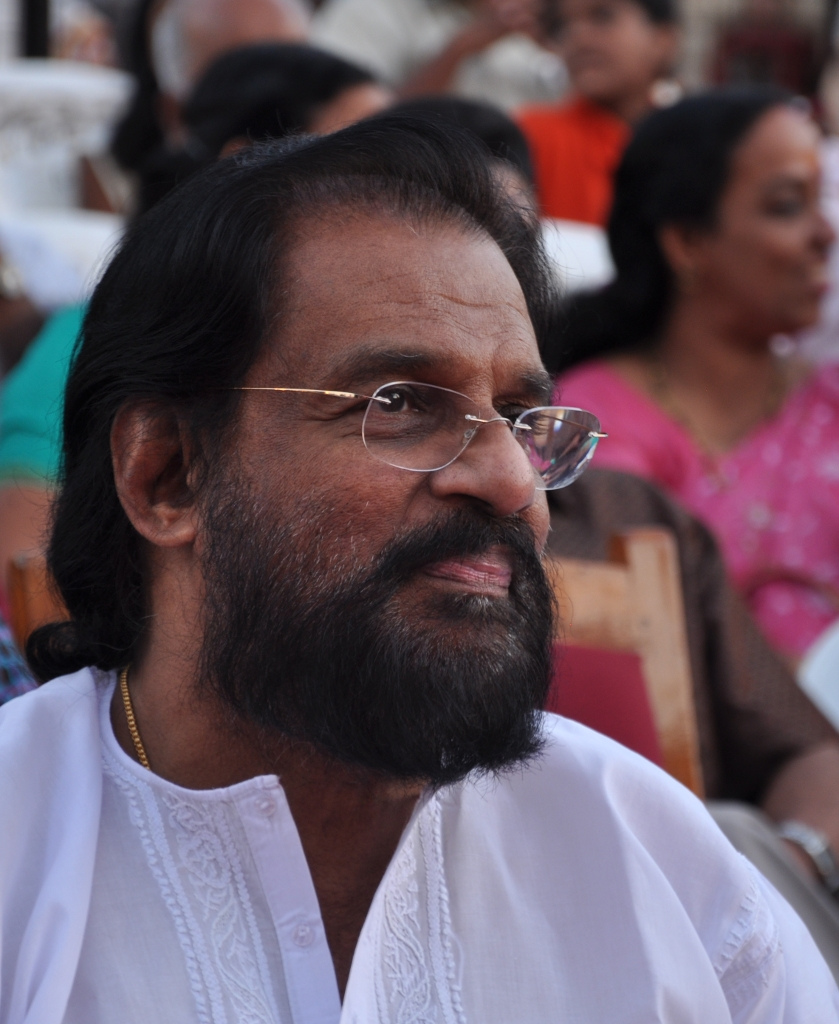
Language	Recipient	Song	Film	Photo
Tamil	Madhu Balakrishnan	Pichai Paathiram	Naan Kadavul
Telugu	Hemachandra	Naalo Nenena	Baanam
Kannada	Chetan Sosca	Yaare Nee Devatheya	Ambaari
Malayalam	K. J. Yesudas	Sivagange	Banaras

2010

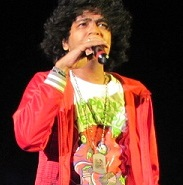
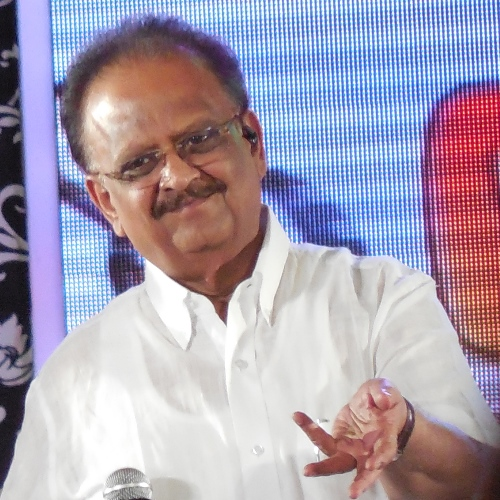
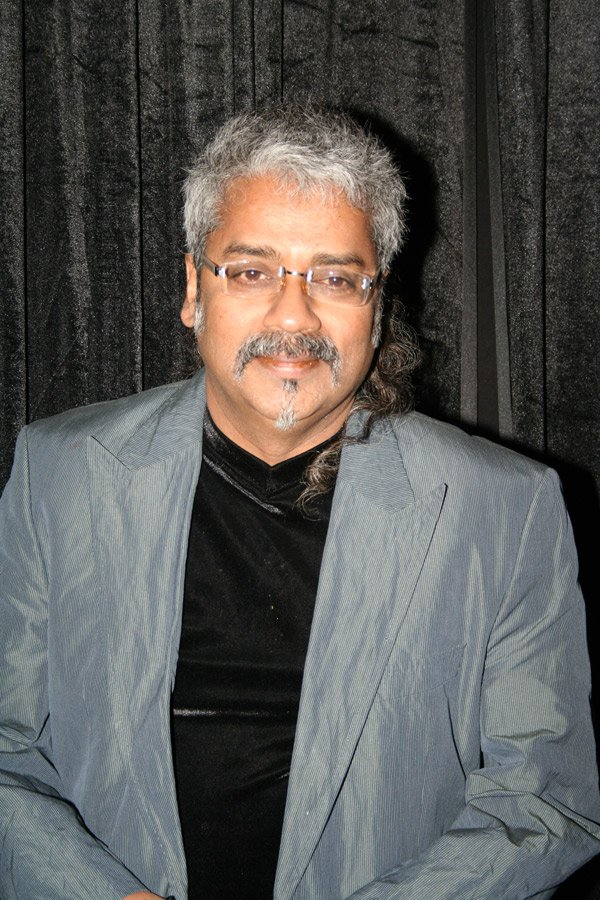
Language	Recipient	Song	Film	Photo
Tamil	Karthik	Usre Poguthe	Raavanan
Telugu	Naresh Iyer	Nenu Nuvvantu	Orange
Kannada	S. P. Balasubrahmanyam	Garane Gara Garane	Aptharakshaka
Malayalam	Hariharan	Aaro Padum	Katha Thudarunnu

2011

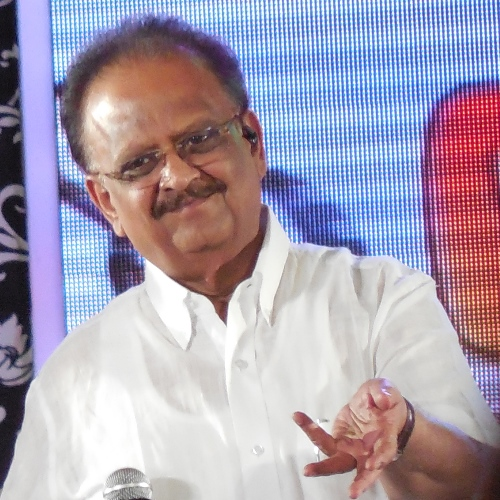
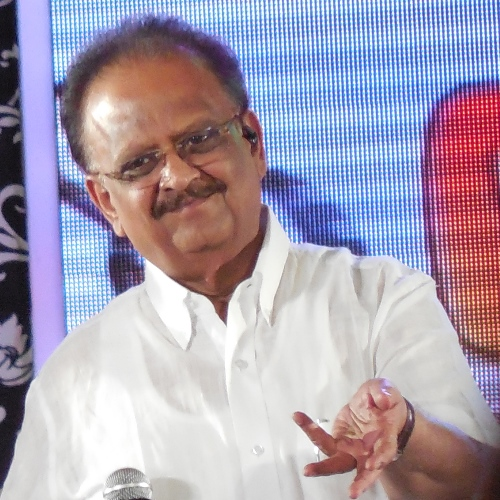
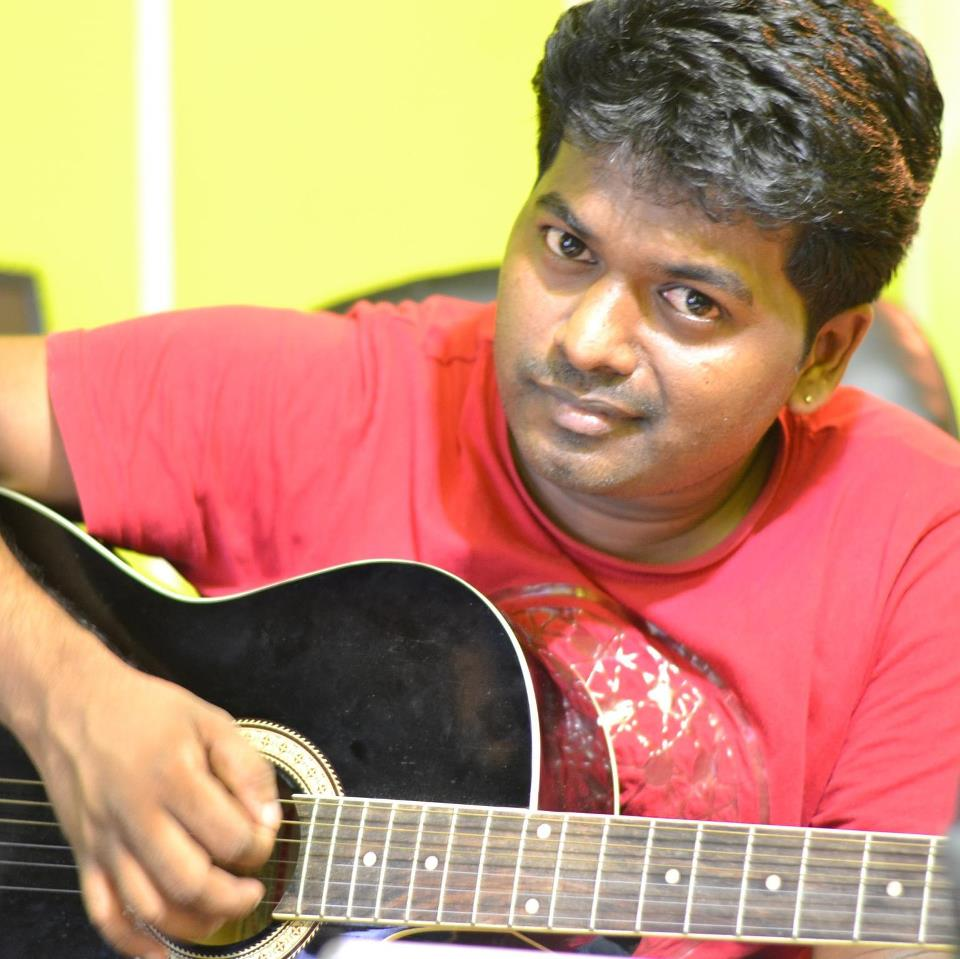
Language	Recipient	Song	Film	Photo
Tamil	S. P. Balasubrahmanyam	Yamma Yamma	7 Aum Arivu
Telugu	S. P. Balasubrahmanyam	Jagadhananda Karaka	Sri Rama Rajyam
Kannada	Ishaan Dev	Shyloo	Shyloo
Malayalam	Sudeep Kumar	Chempakapoo	Rathinirvedam

2012

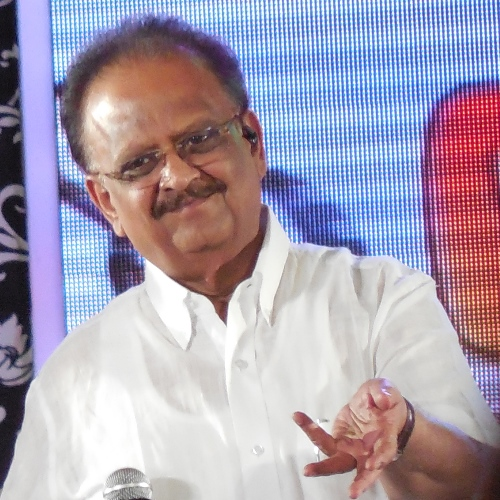
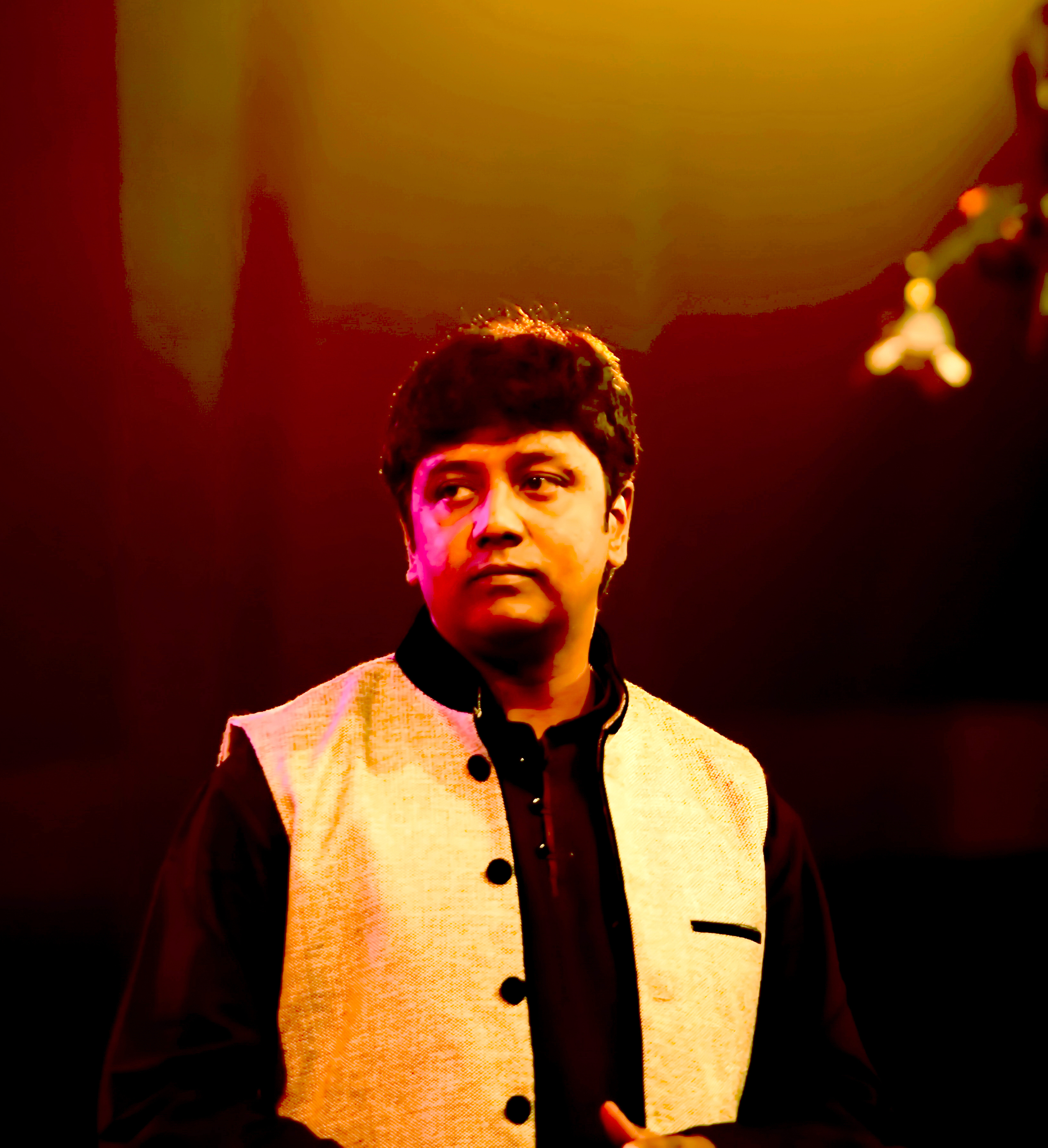
Language	Recipient	Song	Film	Photo
Tamil	Karthik	Kaatrai Konjam	Neethaane En Ponvasantham
Telugu	S. P. Balasubrahmanyam	Vasthunna Baba	Shirdi Sai
Kannada	Chetan Sosca	Namdukke Pyarge	Govindaya Namaha
Malayalam	Nivas	Nilamalare	Diamond Necklace

2013

2014

Language	Recipient	Song	Film	Photo
Tamil
Telugu	Kalyani Malik	Em Sandeham Ledu	Oohalu Gusagusalade
Kannada
Malayalam

2015

2016

Language	Recipient	Song	Film	Photo
Tamil
Telugu
Kannada
Malayalam	Bijibal	Idukki	Maheshinte Prathikaaram

2017

2018

=== Best Music Director ===
2009

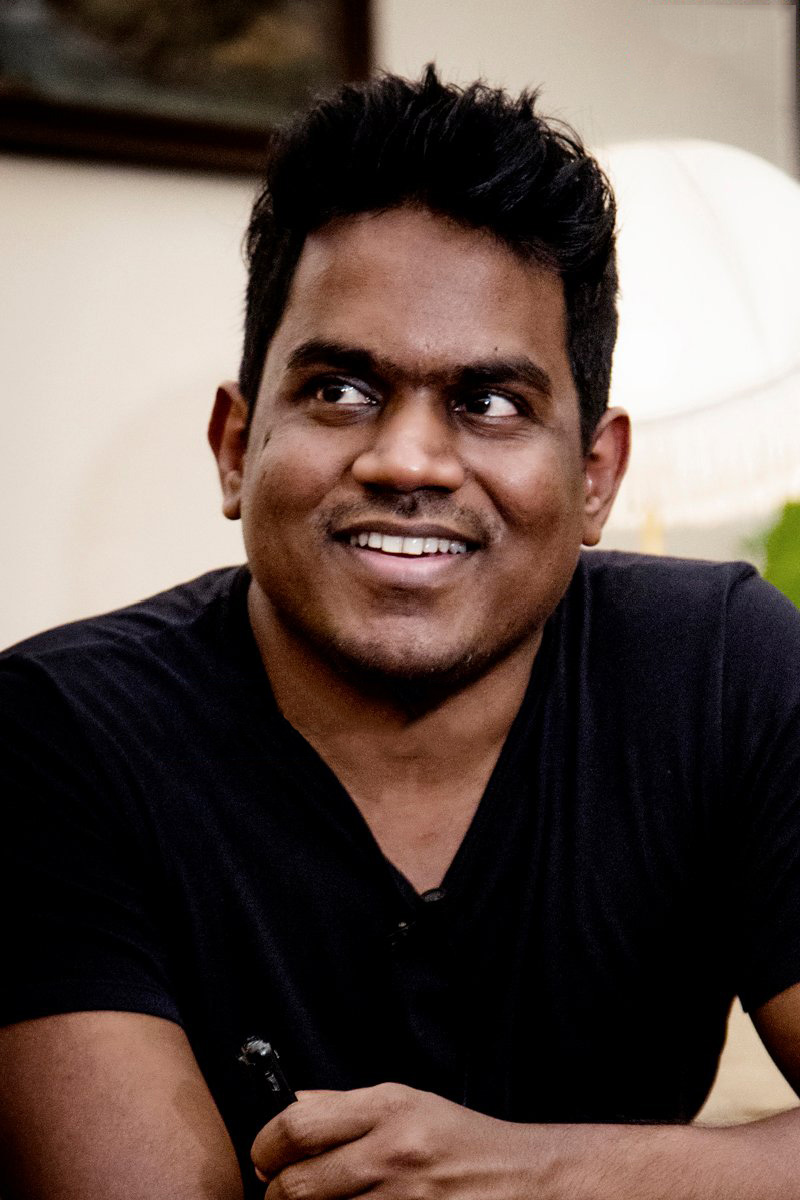
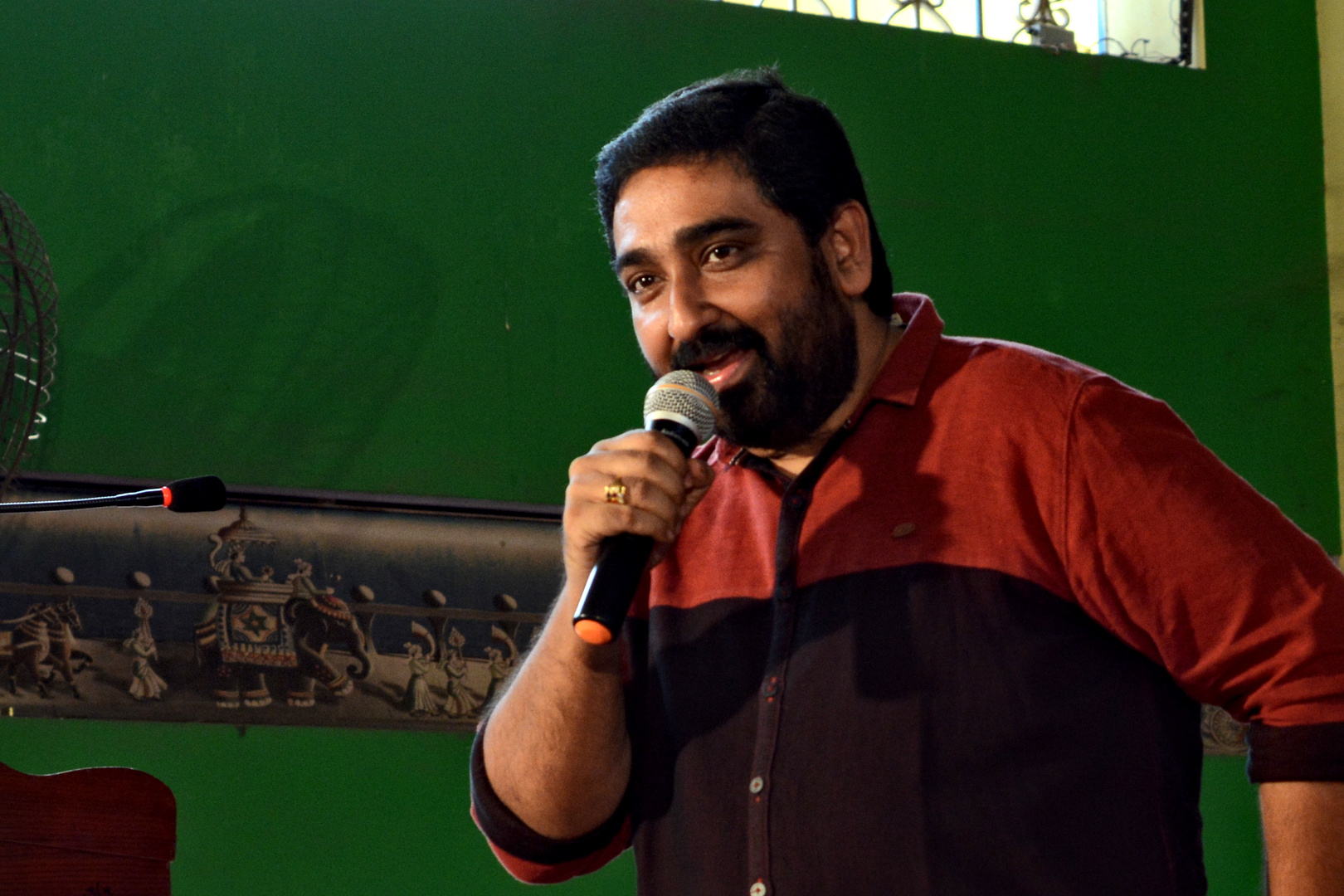
Language	Recipient	Film	Photo
Tamil	Yuvan Shankar Raja	Siva Manasula Sakthi
Telugu	Mani Sharma	Ek Niranjan
Kannada	Mano Murthy	Manasaare
Malayalam	M. Jayachandran	Banaras

2010

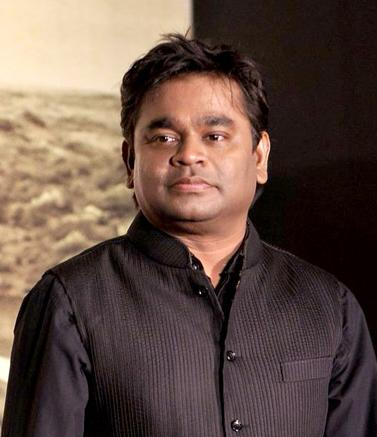
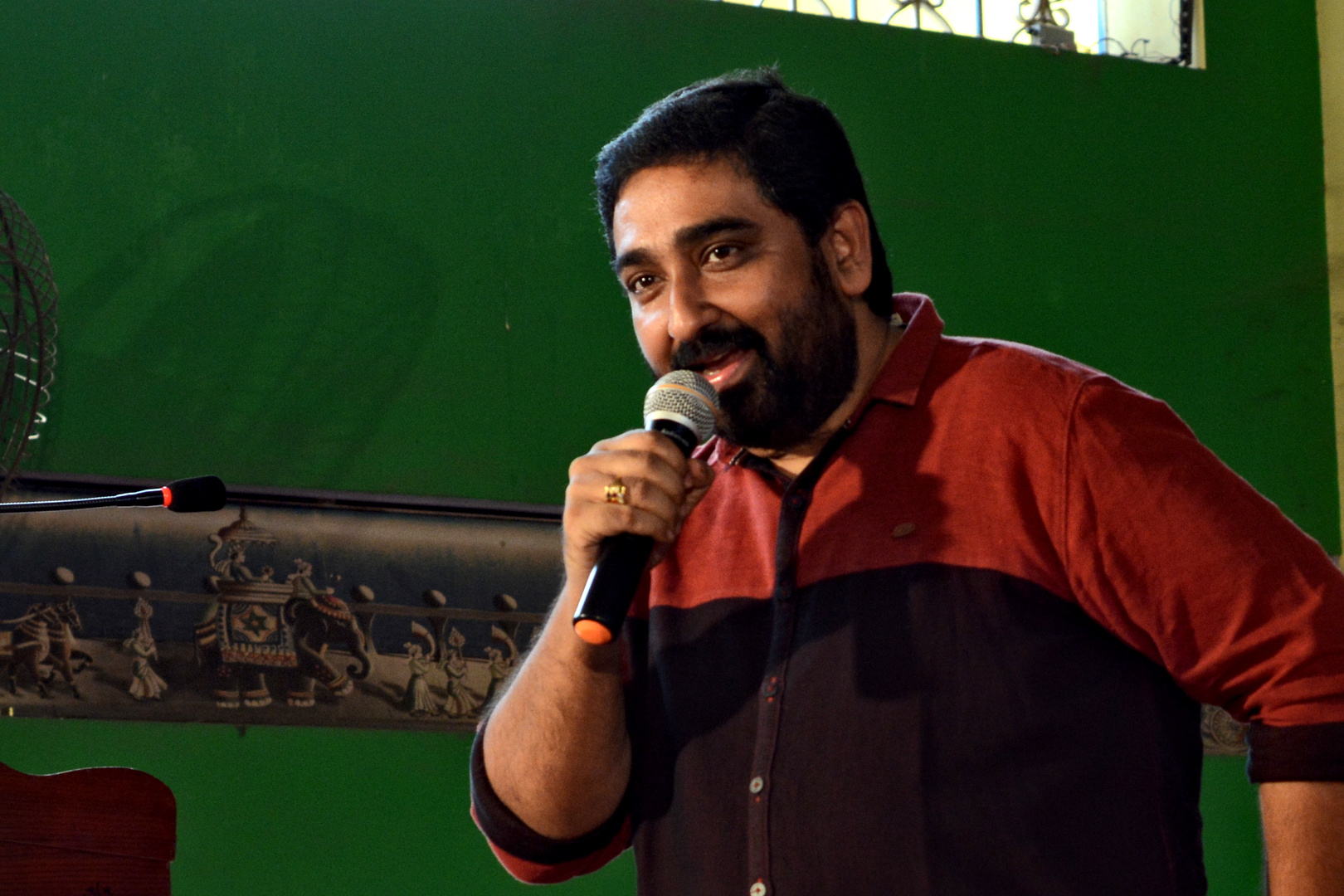
Language	Recipient	Film	Photo
Tamil	A. R. Rahman	Raavanan
Telugu	Mani Sharma	Khaleja
Kannada	Shridhar V. Sambhram	Krishnan Love Story
Malayalam	Jayachandran	Karayilekku Oru Kadal Dooram

2011

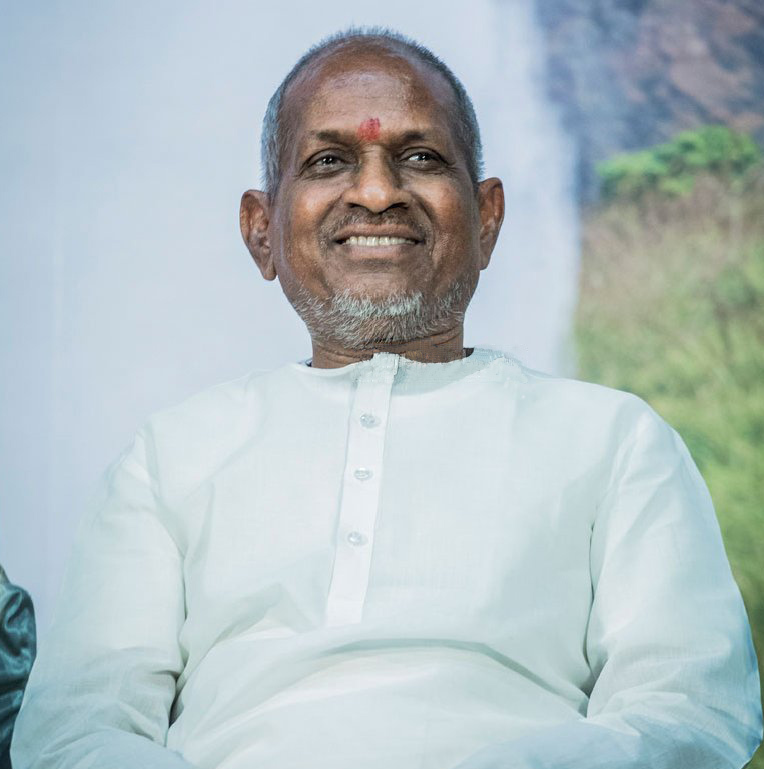
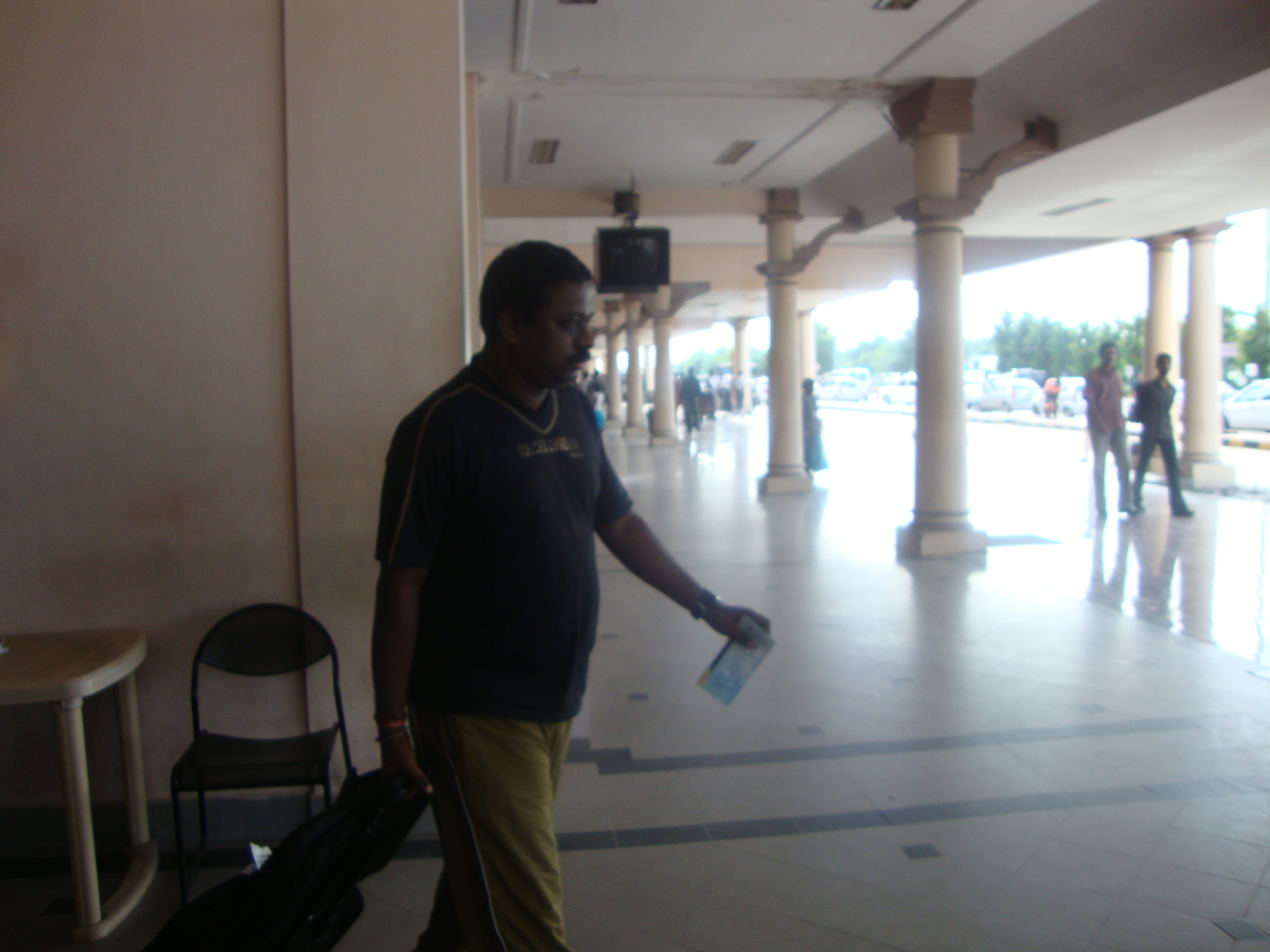
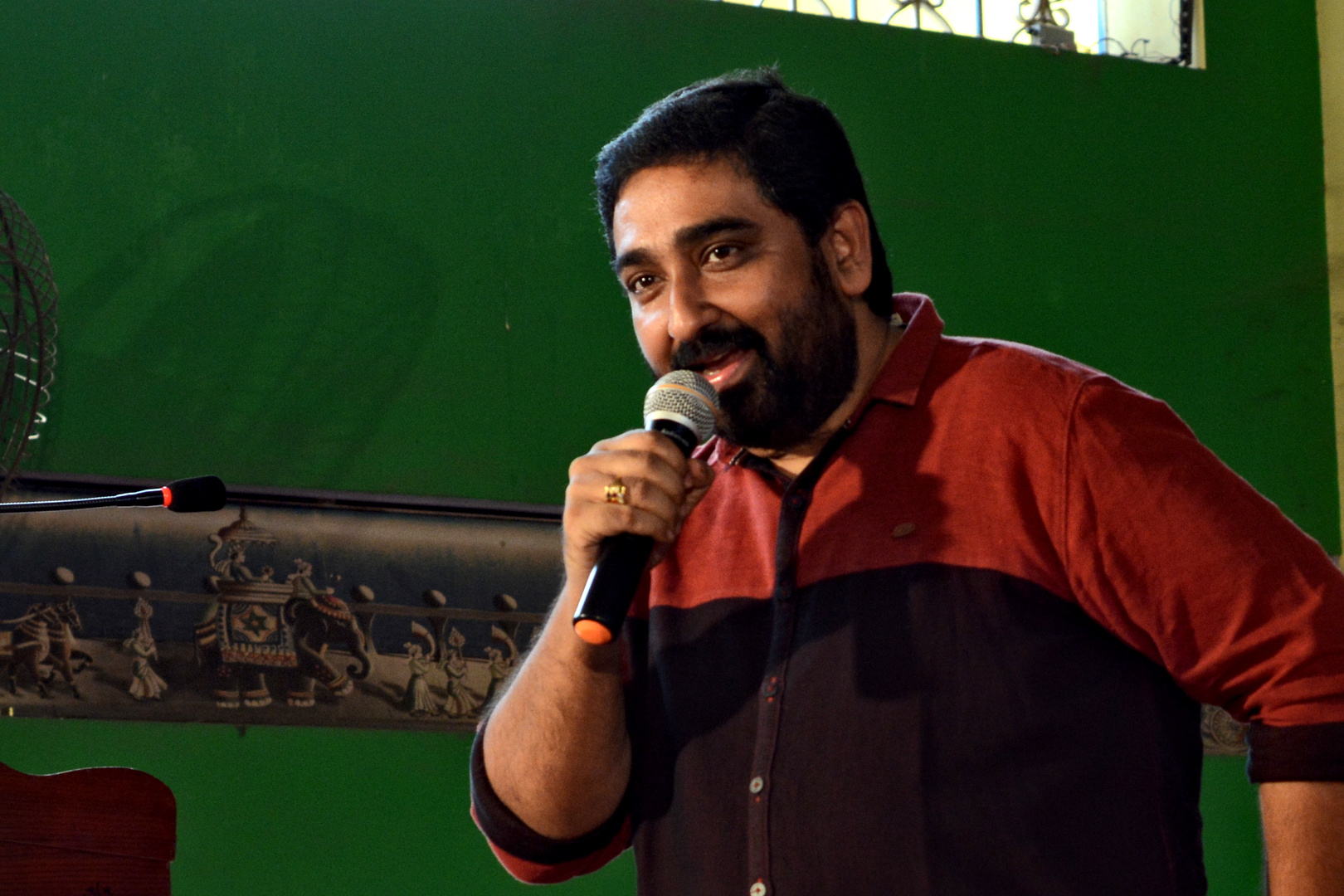
Language	Recipient	Film	Photo
Tamil	G. V. Prakash Kumar	Aadukalam
Telugu	Ilaiyaraaja	Sri Rama Rajyam
Kannada	Jassie Gift	Sanju Weds Geetha
Malayalam	M. Jayachandran	Pranayam

2012

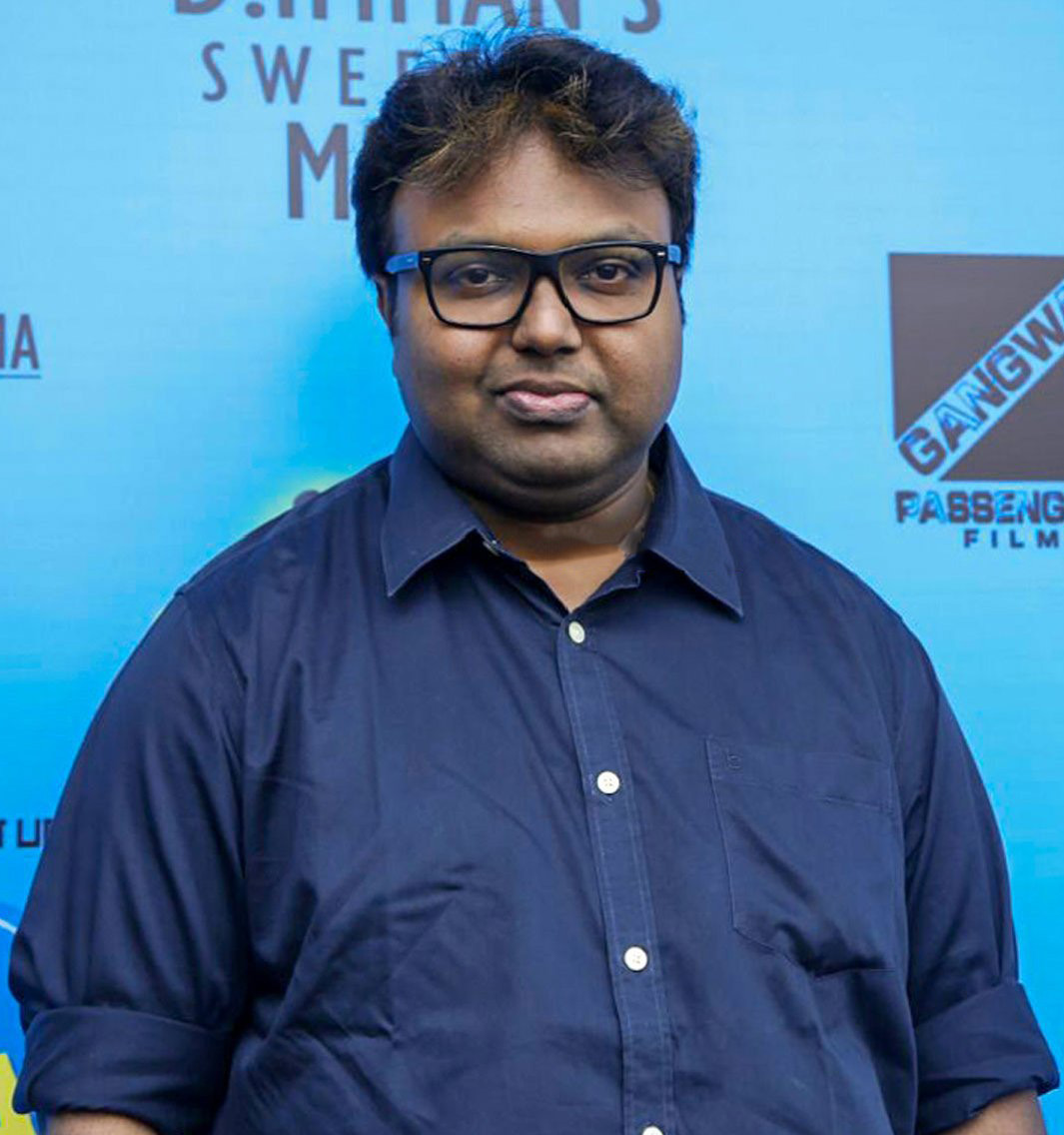
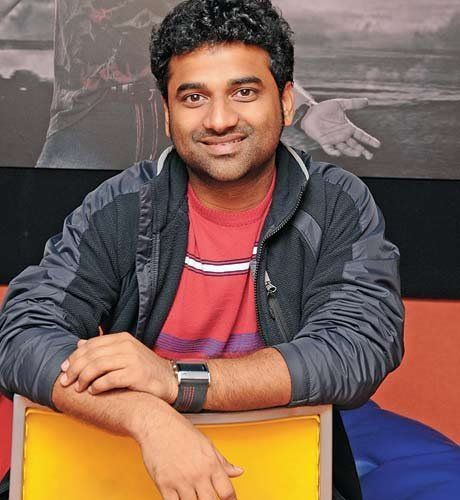
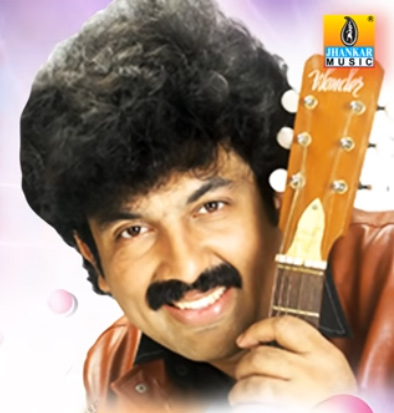
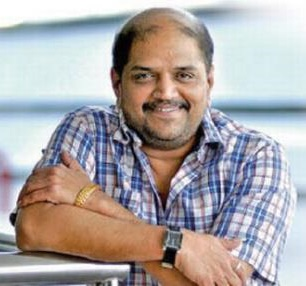
Language	Recipient	Song	Film	Photo
Tamil	D. Imman	Sollitaley Ava Kaadhala	Kumki
Telugu	Devi Sri Prasad	Akasam Ammayaithe	Gabbar Singh
Kannada	Gurukiran	Namdukke Pyarge	Govindaya Namaha
Malayalam	Vidyasagar	Nilamalare	Diamond Necklace

2016

Language	Recipient	Song	Film	Photo
Tamil
Telugu
Kannada
Malayalam	Bijibal	Idukki	Maheshinte Prathikaaram

=== Best Lyricist ===
2009

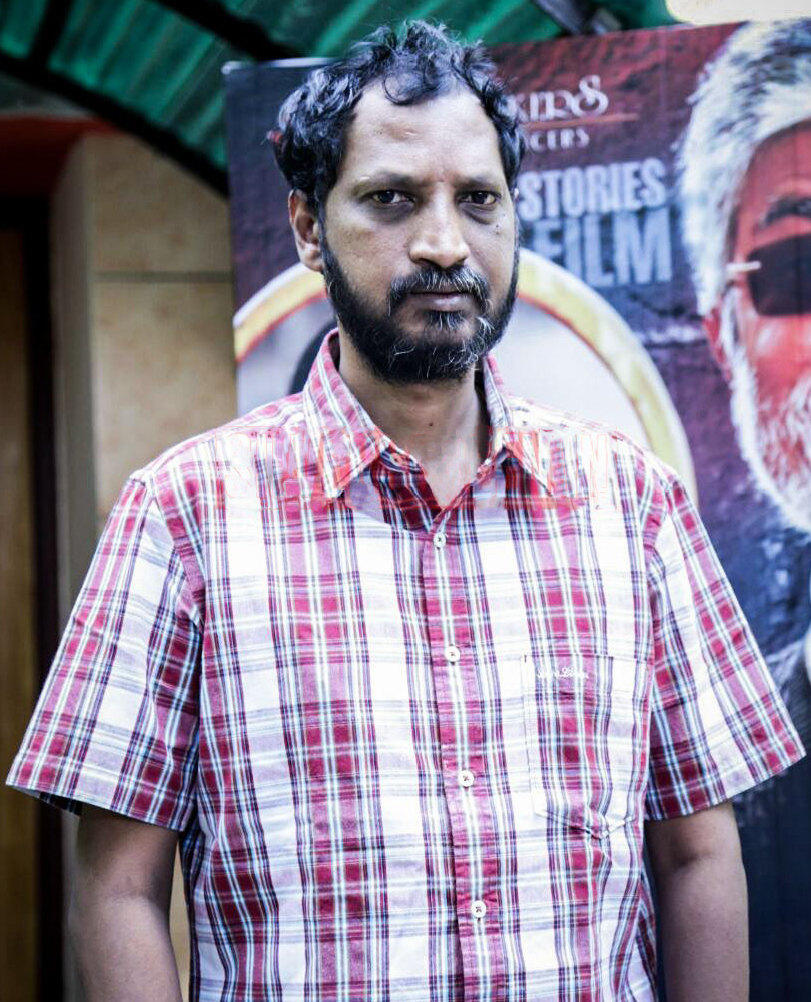
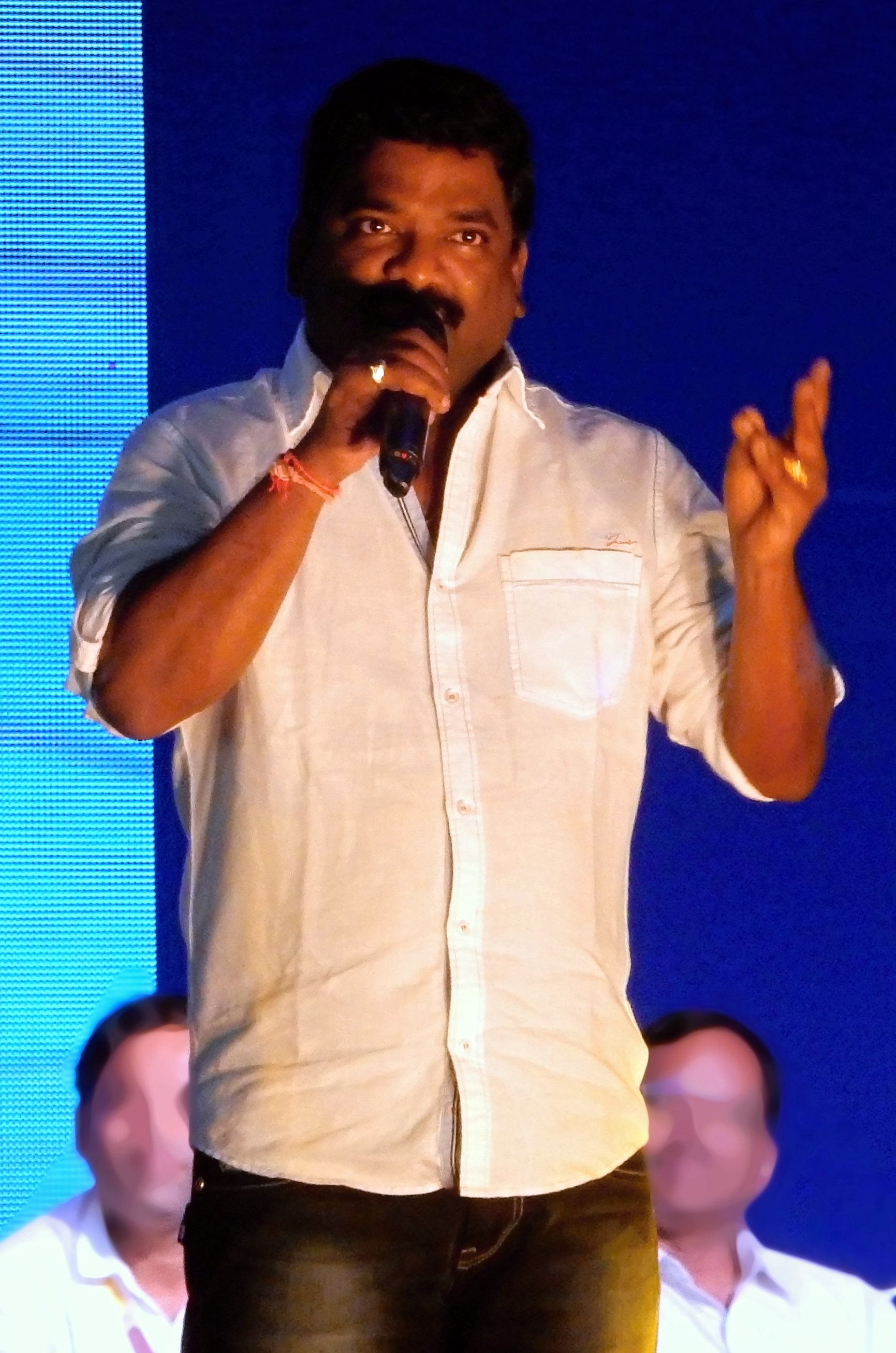
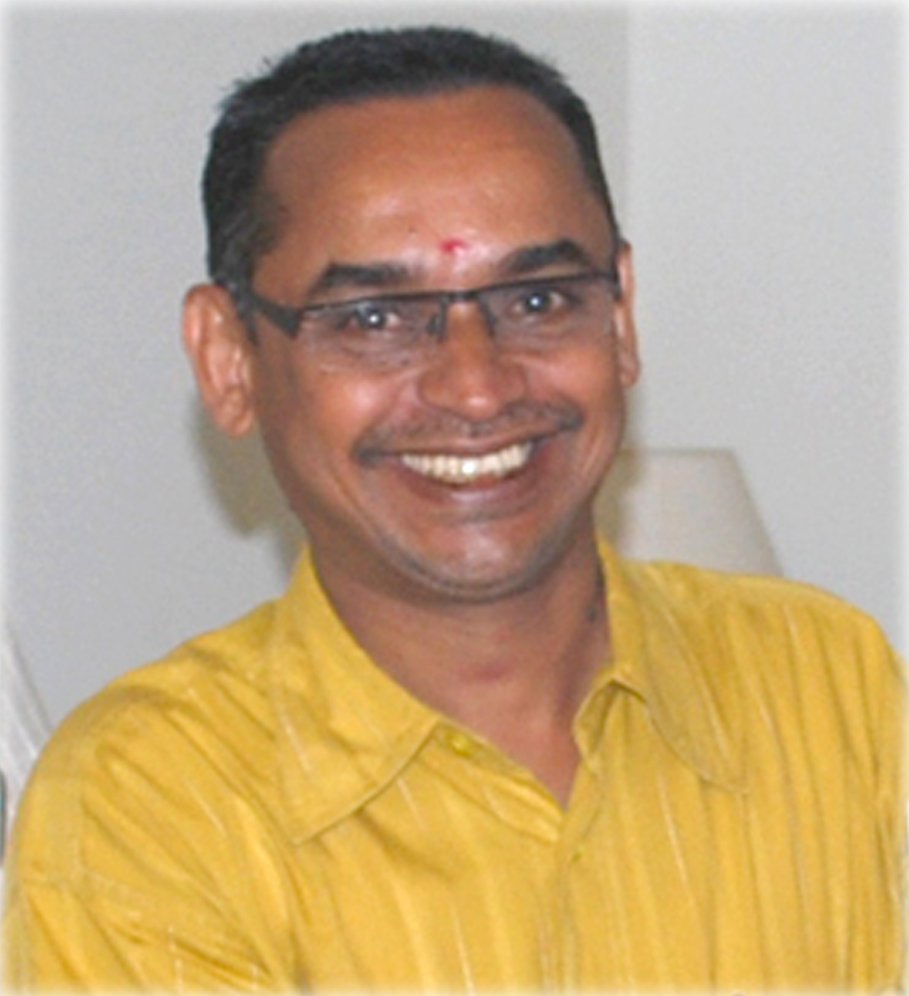
Language	Recipient	Song	Film	Photo
Tamil	Na. Muthukumar	Oru Kal Oru Kannadi	Siva Manasula Sakthi
Telugu	Chandra Bose	Baby he	Aarya 2
Kannada	Kaviraj	Nadedhaduva Kaamanabillu	Parichaya
Malayalam	Vayalar Sarath Chandra Varma	Anuraaga	Neelathamara

2010

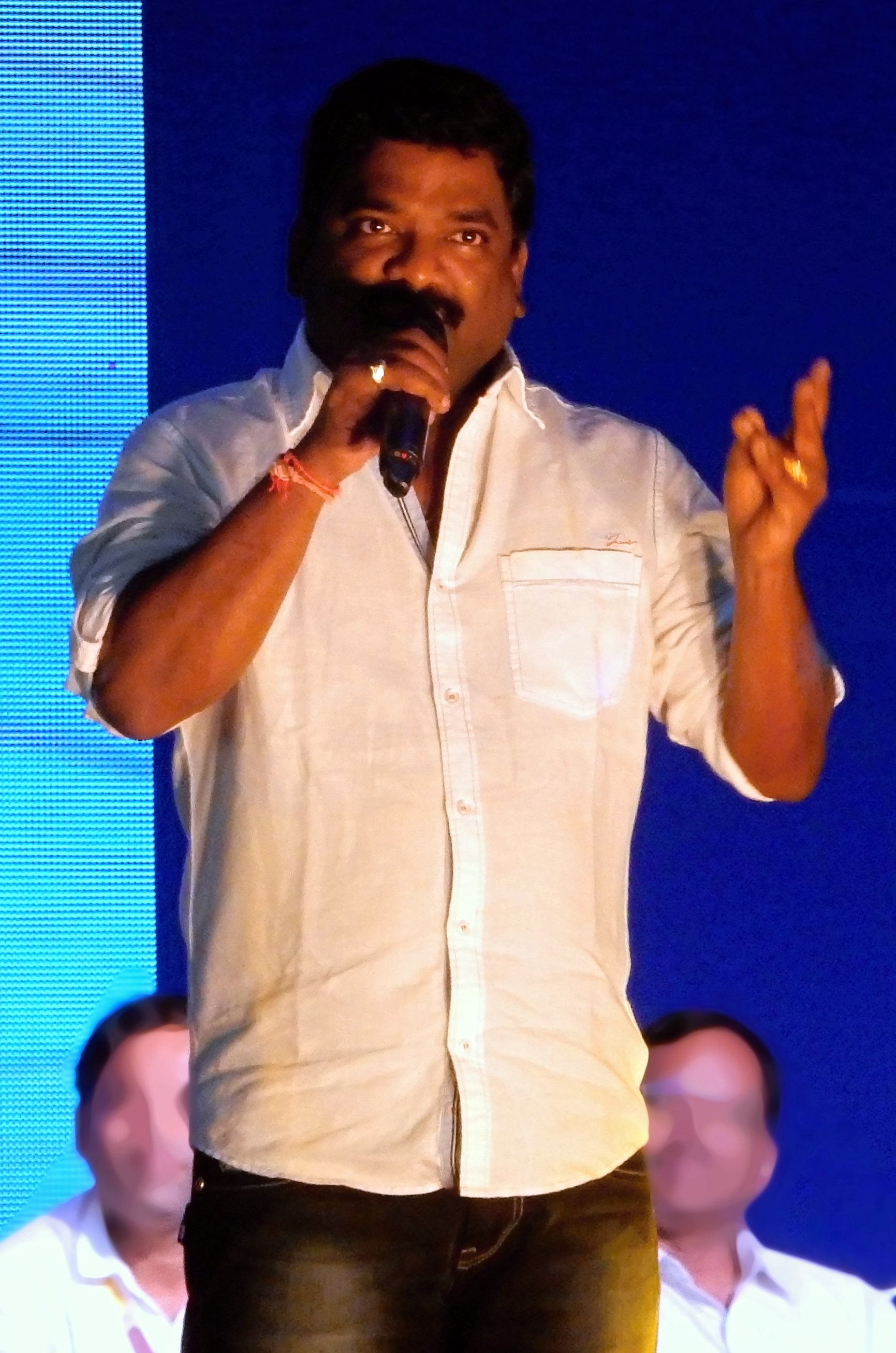
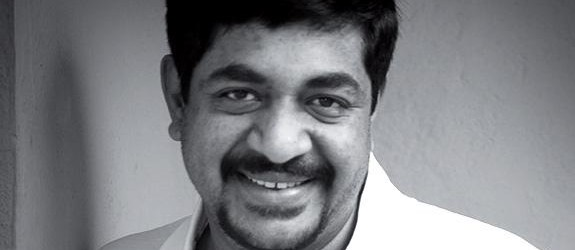
Language	Recipient	Song	Film	Photo
Tamil	Yuga Bharathi	Mynaa Mynaa	Mynaa
Telugu	Chandra Bose	Desamante	Jhummandi Naadam
Kannada	Yogaraj Bhat	Ekka Raja Ninna	Jackie
Malayalam	Gireesh Puthenchery	Pinne Ennodonnum	Shikkar

2011

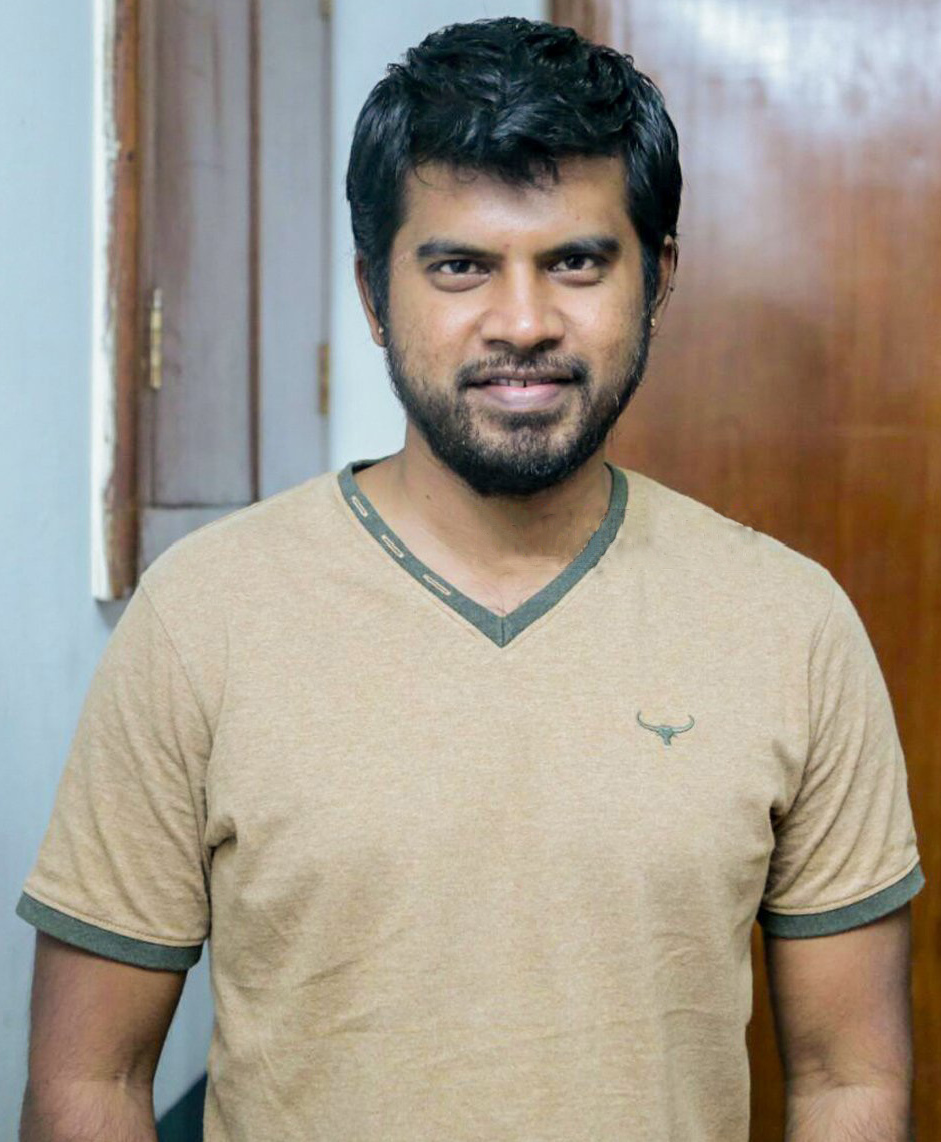
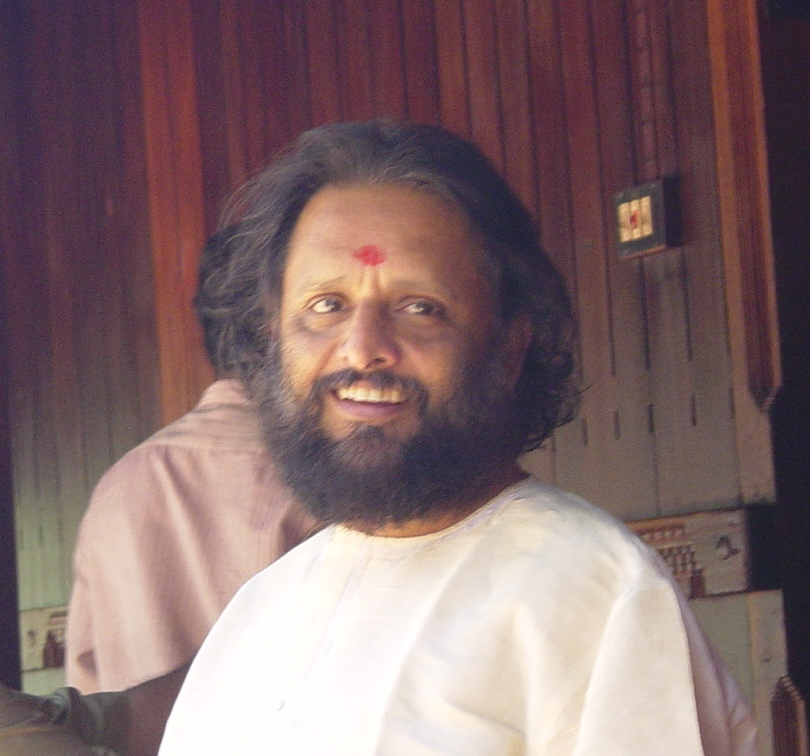
Language	Recipient	Song	Film	Photo
Tamil	P. Vijay	Innum Enna Thozha	7 Aum Arivu
Telugu	Jonnavithula	Jagadhananda Karaka	Sri Rama Rajyam
Kannada	Kaviraj	Gaganave Baagi	Sanju Weds Geetha
Malayalam	Kaithapram	Chimmi Chimmi	Urumi

2012

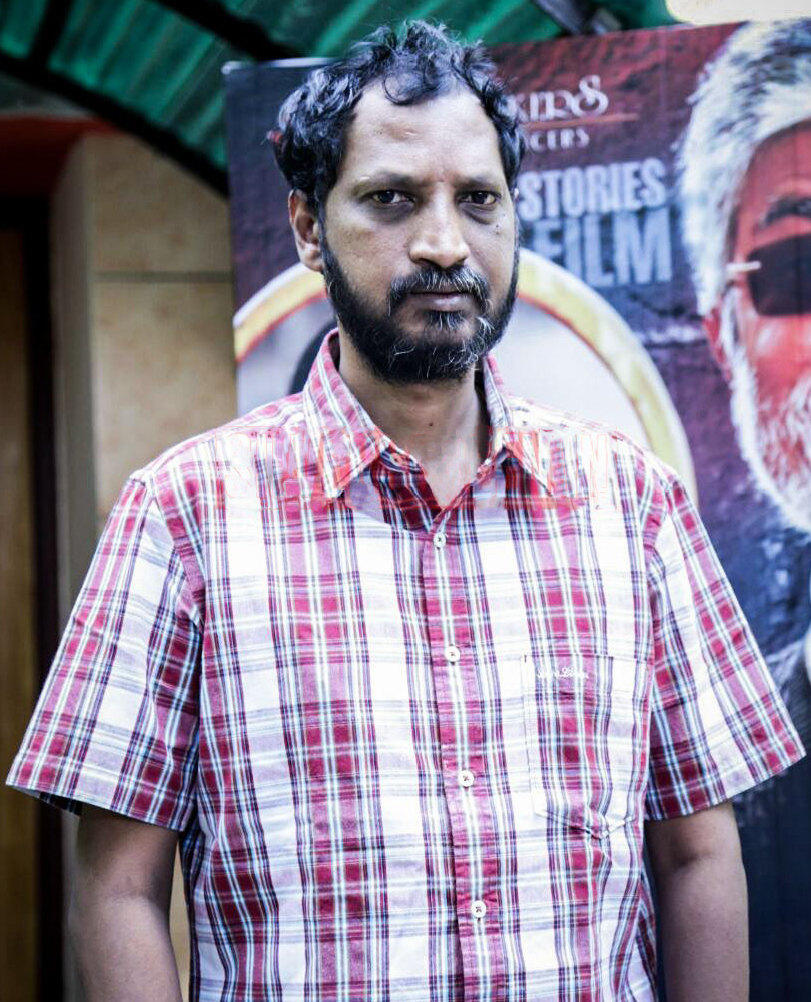
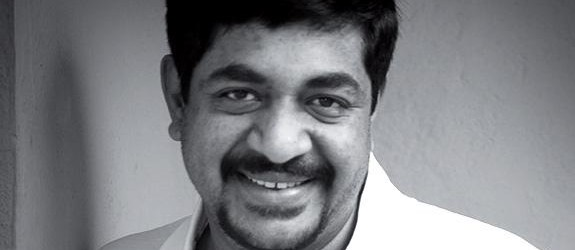
Language	Recipient	Song	Film	Photo
Tamil	Na. Muthukumar	Oru Paadhi Kadhavu	Thaandavam
Telugu	Sirivennela Sitaramasastri	Pillalu Bagunnara	Onamalu
Kannada	Yogaraj Bhat	Bombe Adsonu	Drama
Malayalam	Rafeeq Ahmed	Maranam Ethunna Nerathu	Spirit

2016

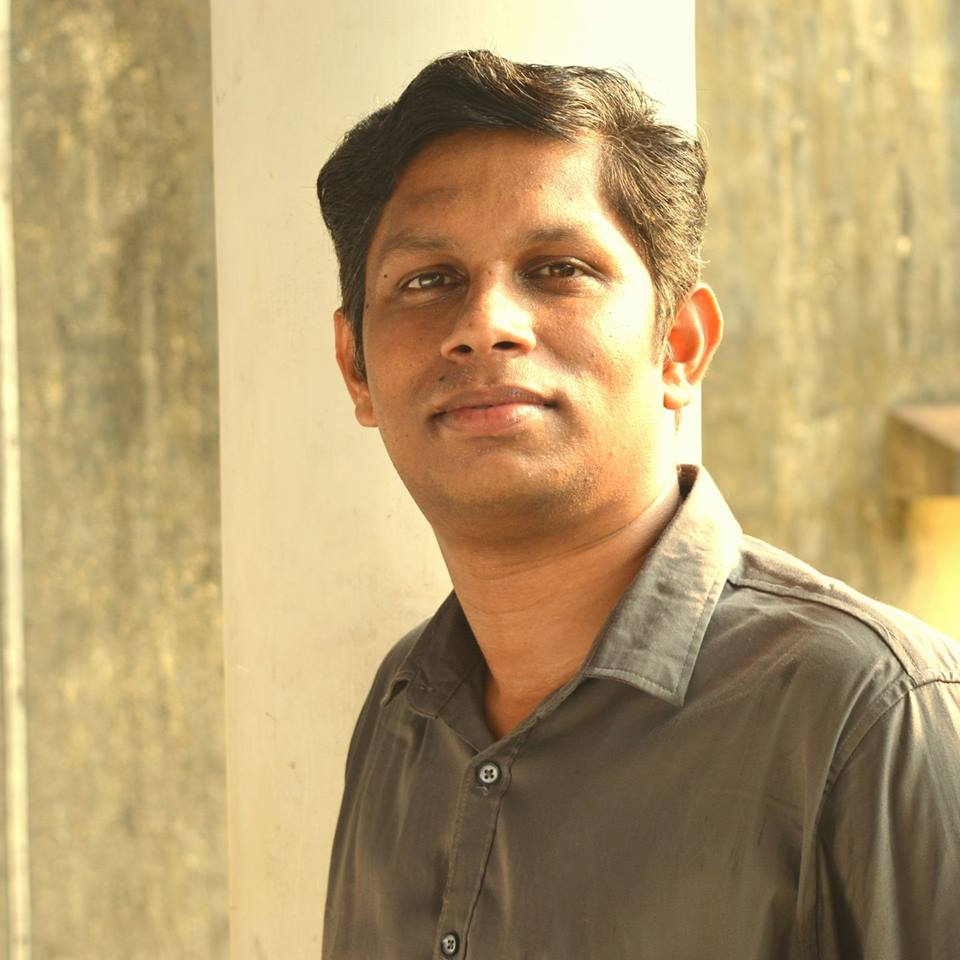
Language	Recipient	Song	Film	Photo
Tamil
Telugu
Kannada
Malayalam	Manu Manjith	Thiruvavani raavu	Jacobinte Swargarajyam

2021

Language	Recipient	Song	Film	Photo
Tamil
Telugu	Ananta Sriram	Taaanu Nenu	Sahasam Swasaga Sagipo
Kannada
Malayalam

=== Song of the Year ===
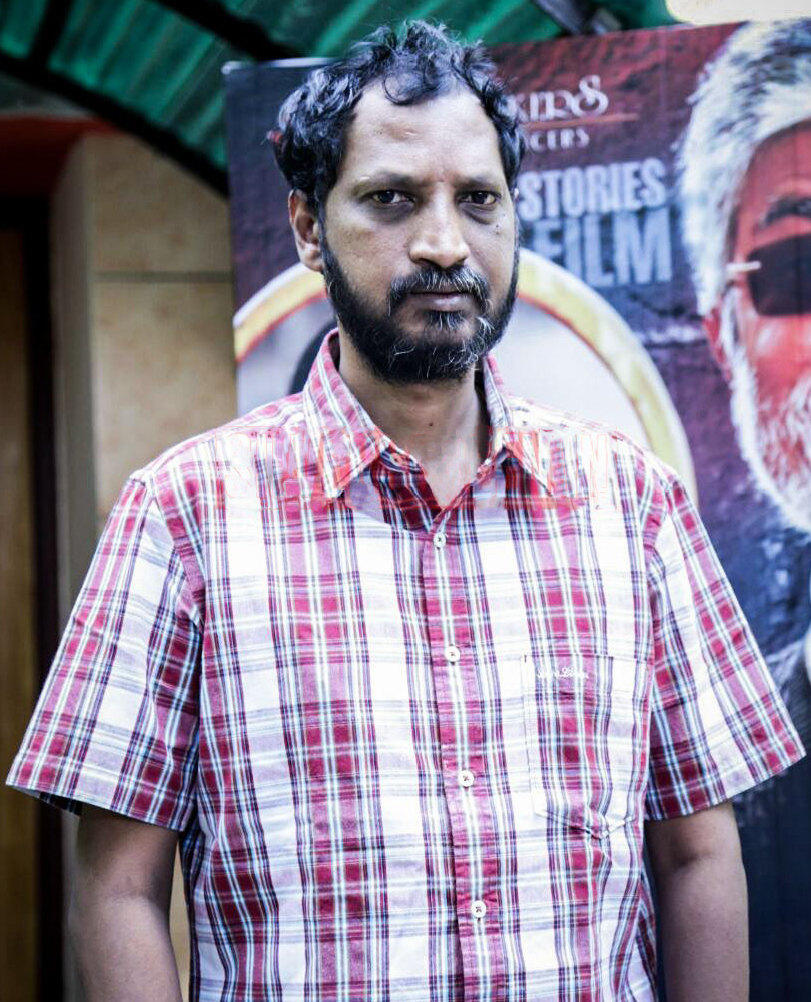
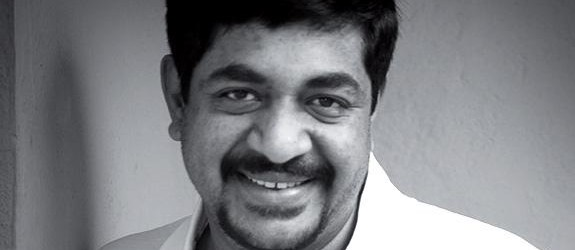
Language	Recipient	Song	Film	Photo
Tamil	Na. Muthukumar	Oru Paadhi Kadhavu	Thaandavam
Telugu	Sirivennela Sitaramasastri	Pillalu Bagunnara	Onamalu
Kannada	Yogaraj Bhat	Bombe Adsonu	Drama
Malayalam	Rafeeq Ahmed	Maranam Ethunna Nerathu	Spirit

2009

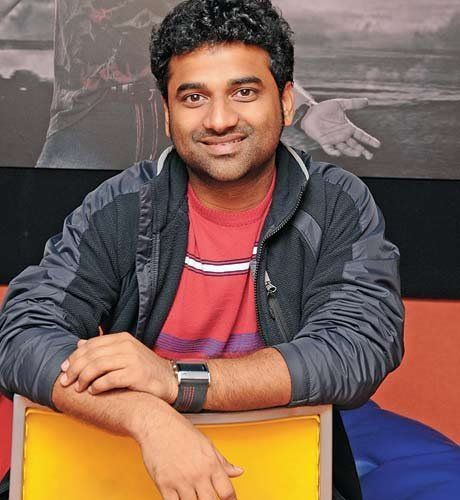
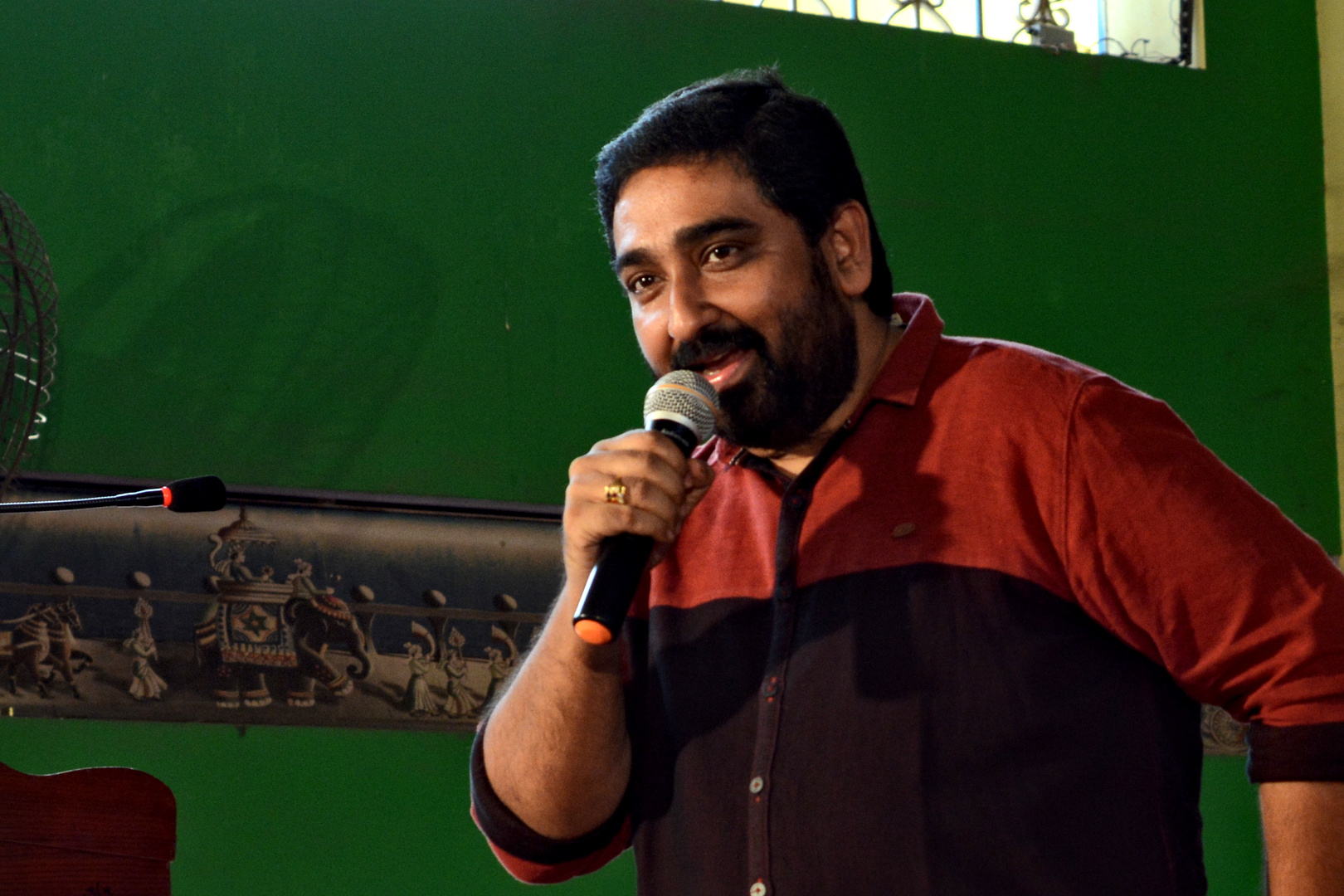
Language	Recipient	Song	Film	Photo
Tamil	Vijay Antony	Azhagai Pookuthey	Ninaithale Inikkum
Telugu	Devi Sri Prasad	Ringa Ringa	Aarya 2
Kannada	Manikanth Kadri	Marali Mareyagi	Savari
Malayalam	M. Jayachandran	Madhuram Gayathi	Banaras

2010

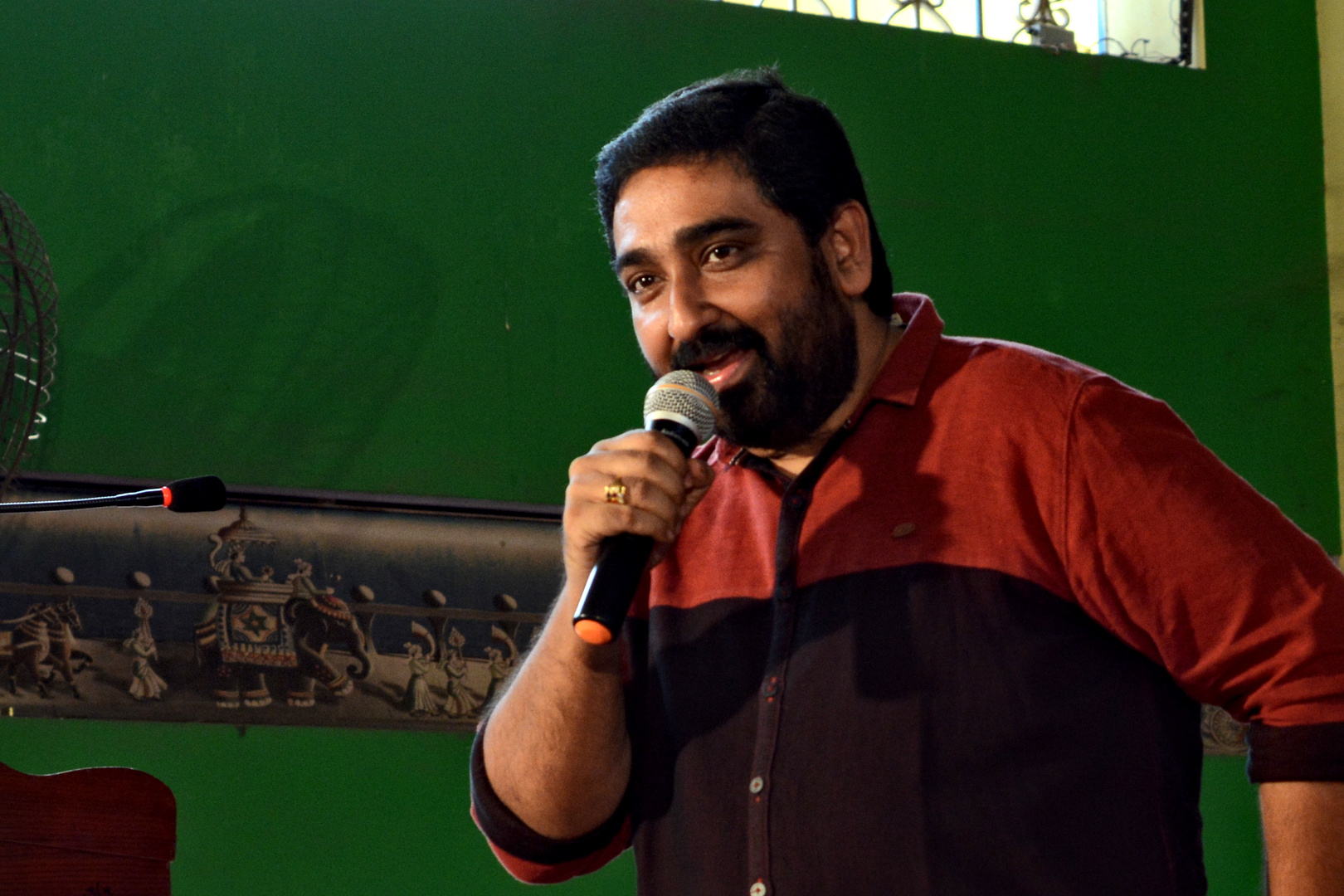
Language	Recipient	Song	Film	Photo
Tamil	G. V. Prakash Kumar	Pookal Pookum	Madarasapattinam
Telugu	Mani Sharma	Sada Siva	Khaleja
Kannada	V. Harikrishna	Shiva Antha Hogutidde	Jackie
Malayalam	M. Jayachandran	Chithrasalabhame	Karayilekku Oru Kadal Dooram

2011

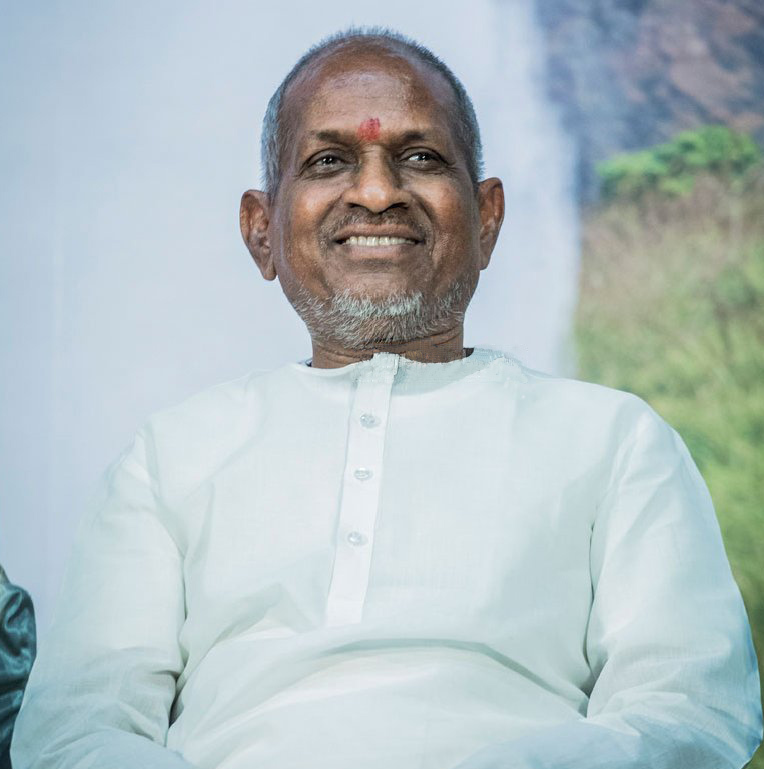
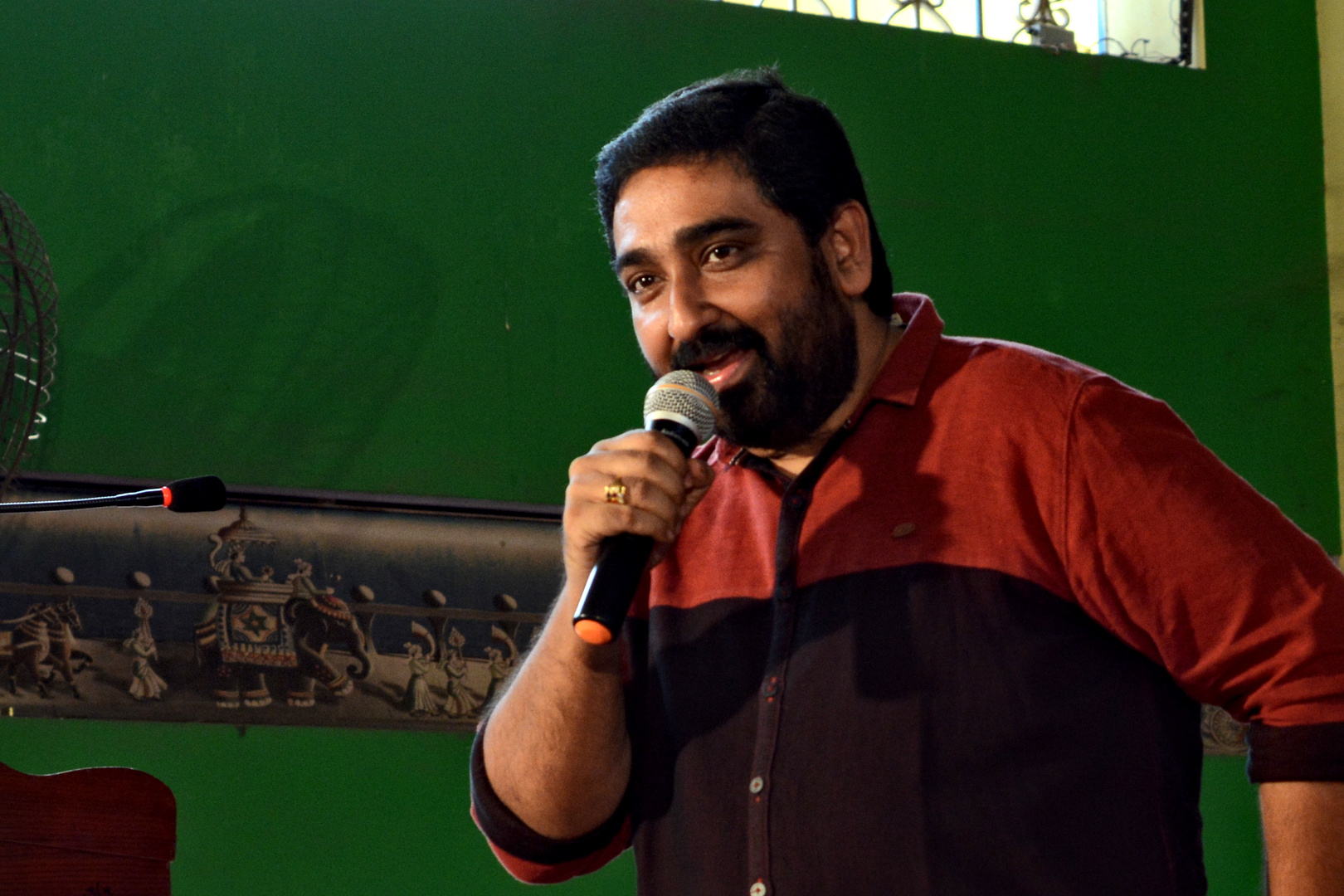
Language	Recipient	Song	Film	Photo
Tamil	Harris Jayaraj	Enamo Aedho	Ko
Telugu	Ilaiyaraaja	Jagadhananda Karaka	Sri Rama Rajyam
Kannada	V. Harikrishna		Paramathma
Malayalam	M. Jayachandran	Paattil Ee Paattil	Pranayam

2012

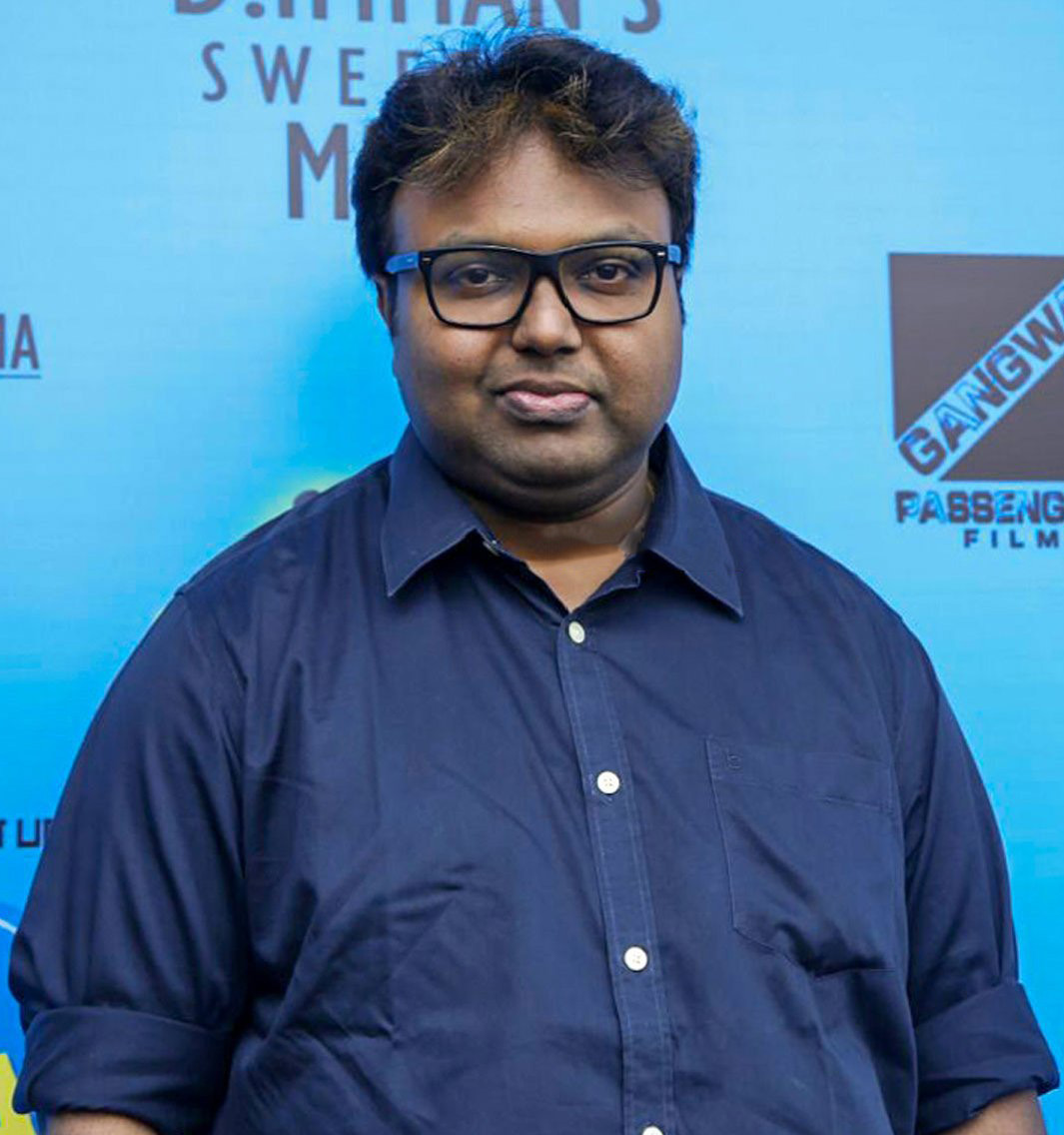
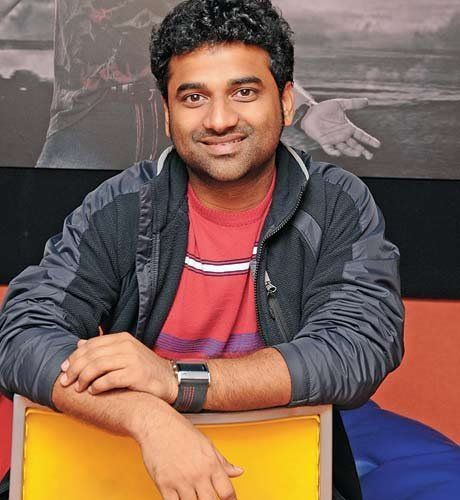
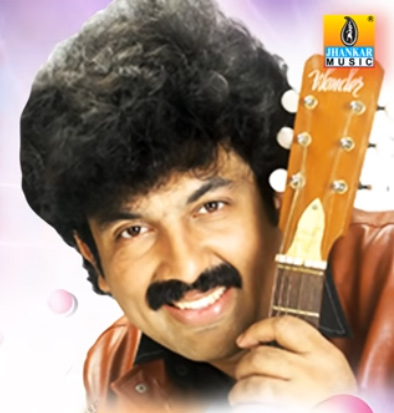
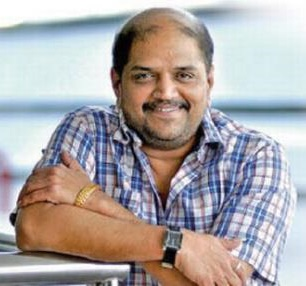
Language	Recipient	Song	Film	Photo
Tamil	D. Imman	Ayayayoo Aananthamey	Kumki
Telugu	Devi Sri Prasad	Akasam Ammayaithe	Gabbar Singh
Kannada	Gurukiran	Namdukke Pyarge	Govindaya Namaha
Malayalam	Vidyasagar	Nilamalare	Diamond Necklace

2013

2014

2015

2016

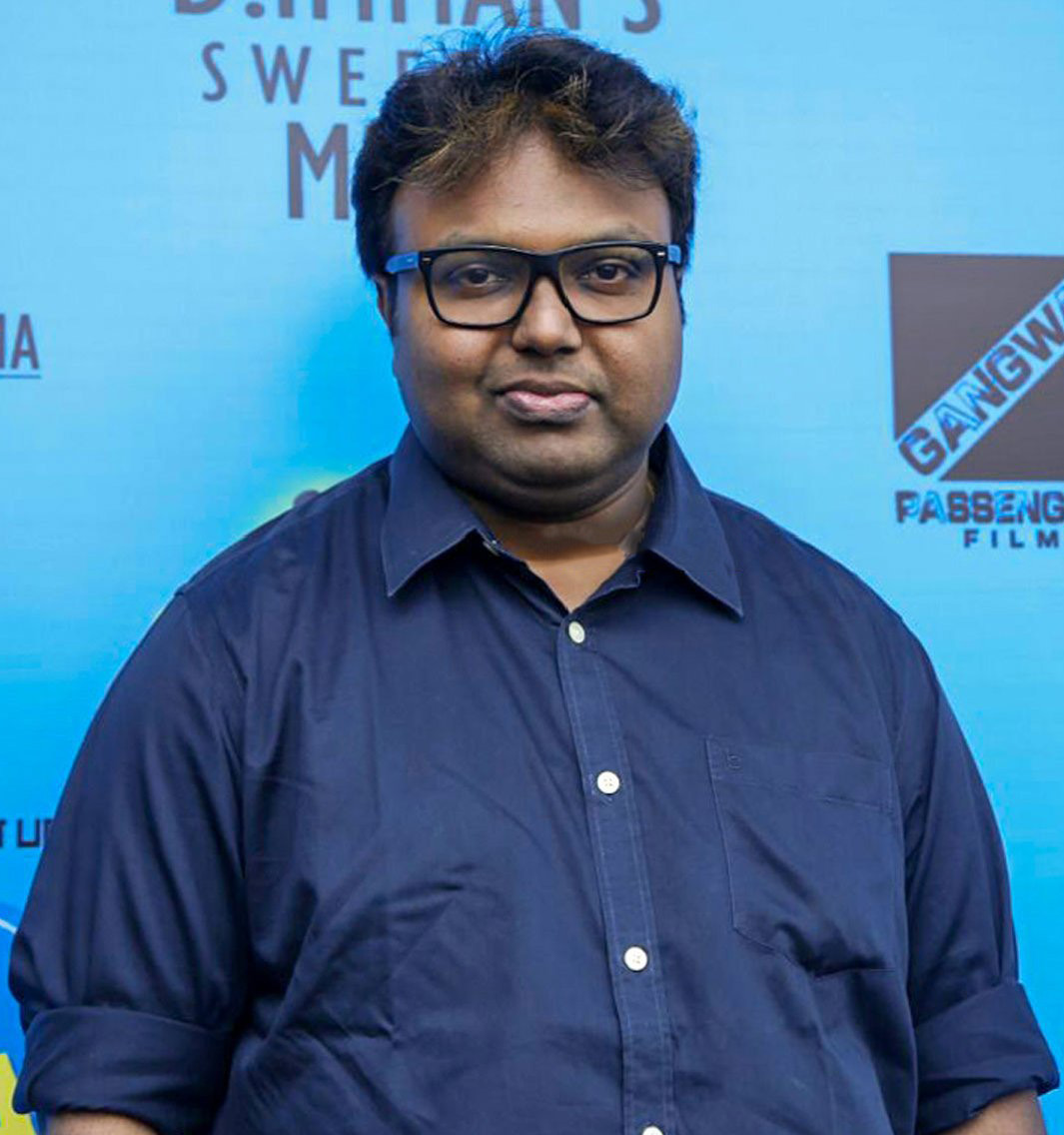
Language	Recipient	Song	Film	Photo
Tamil
Telugu
Kannada	D. Imman	Saaluthillave	Kotigobba 2
Malayalam

=== Album of the Year ===
2009

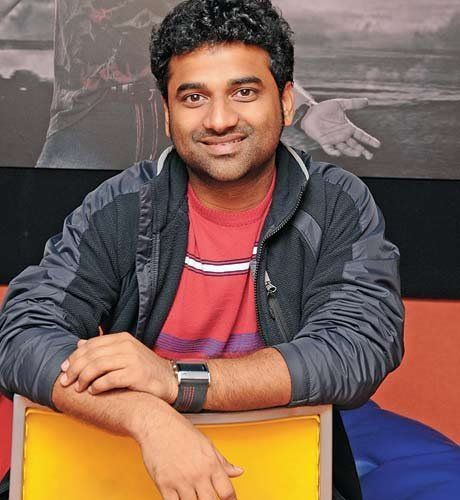
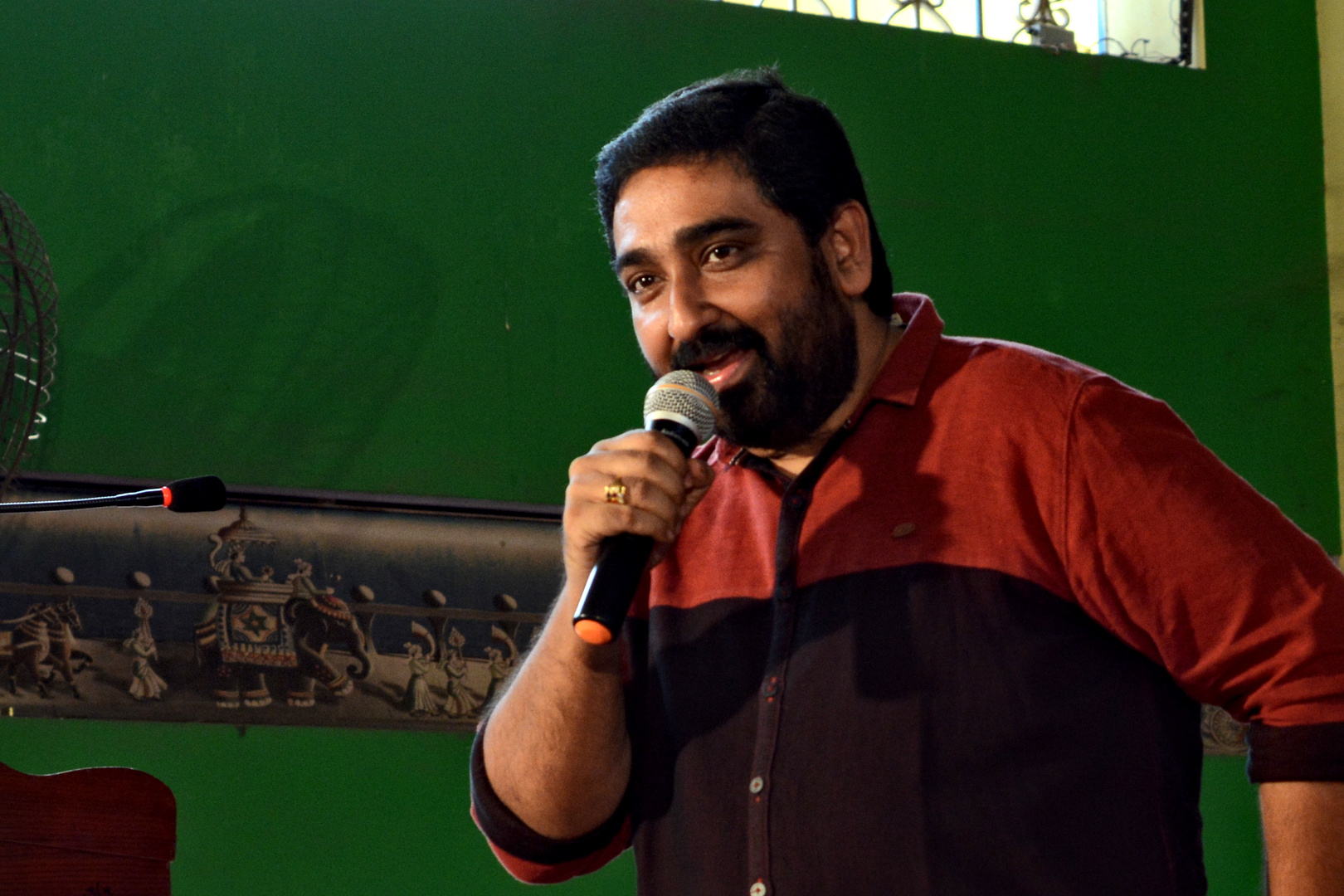
Language	Recipient	Film	Photo
Tamil	Harris Jayaraj	Ayan
Telugu	Devi Sri Prasad	Aarya 2
Kannada	V. Harikrishna	Raaj the Showman
Malayalam	M. Jayachandran	Banaras

2010

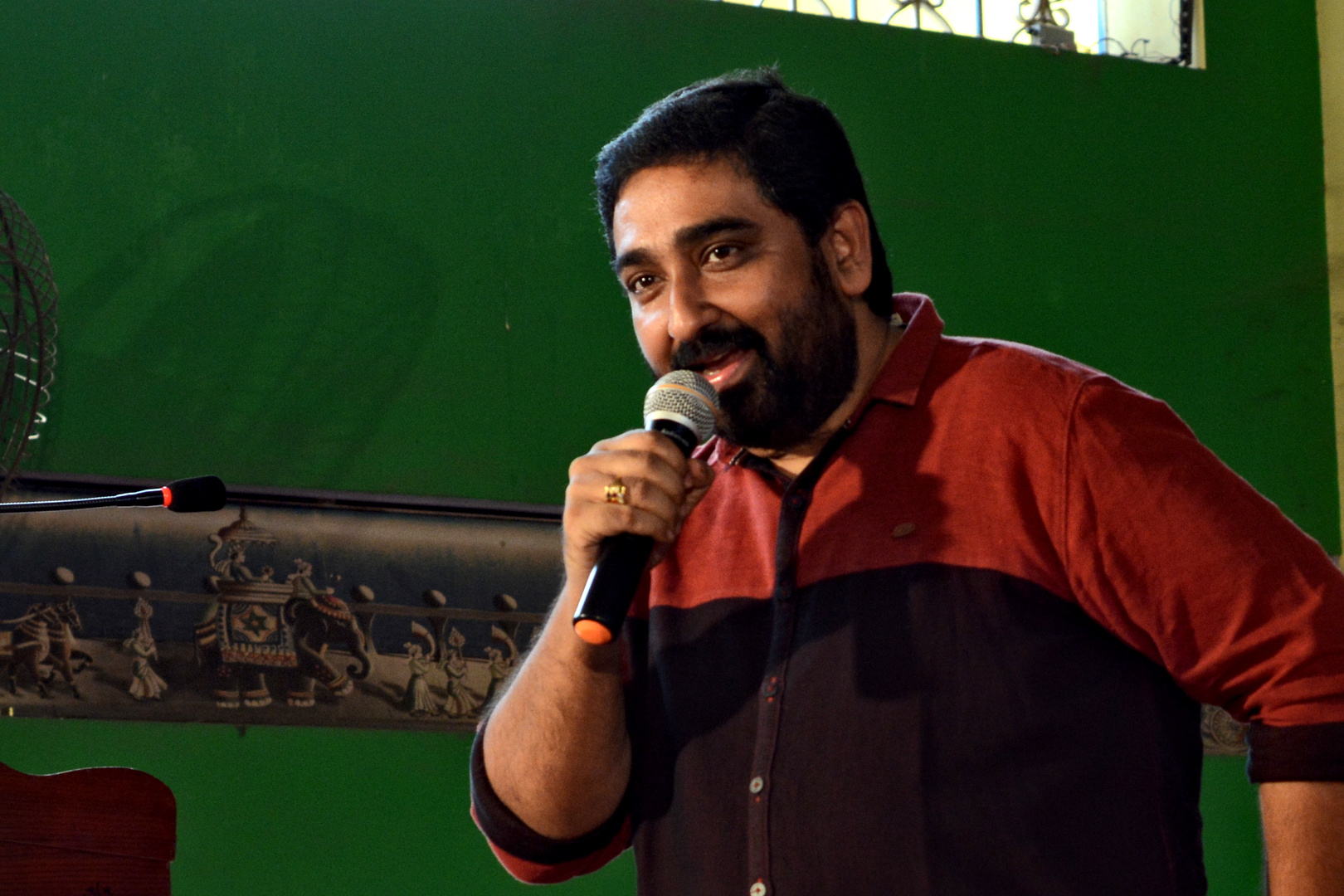
Language	Recipient	Film	Photo
Tamil	Yuvan Shankar Raja	Paiyaa
Telugu	Harris Jayaraj	Orange
Kannada	V. Harikrishna	Jackie
Malayalam	M. Jayachandran	Karayilekku Oru Kadal Dooram

2011

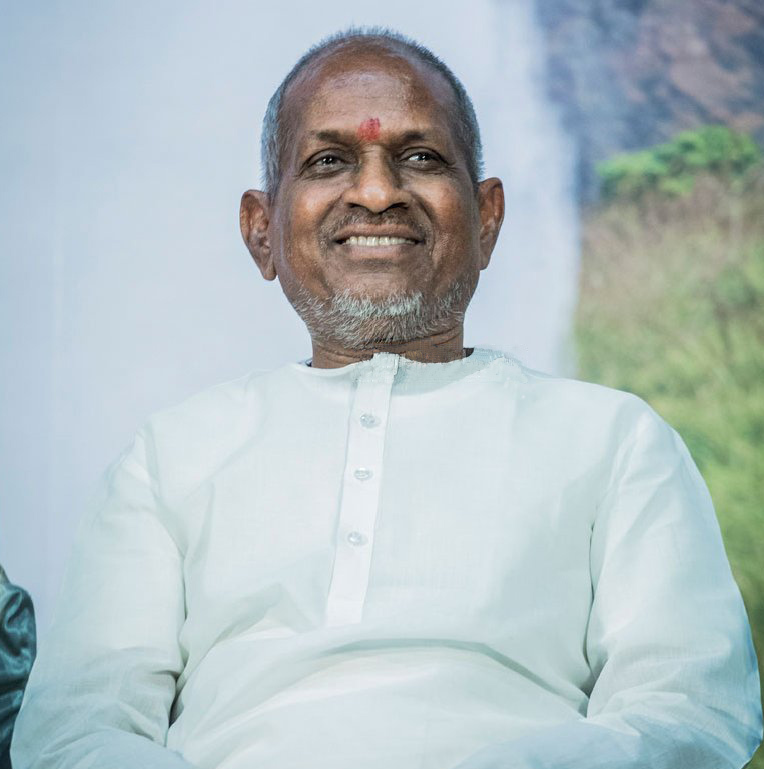
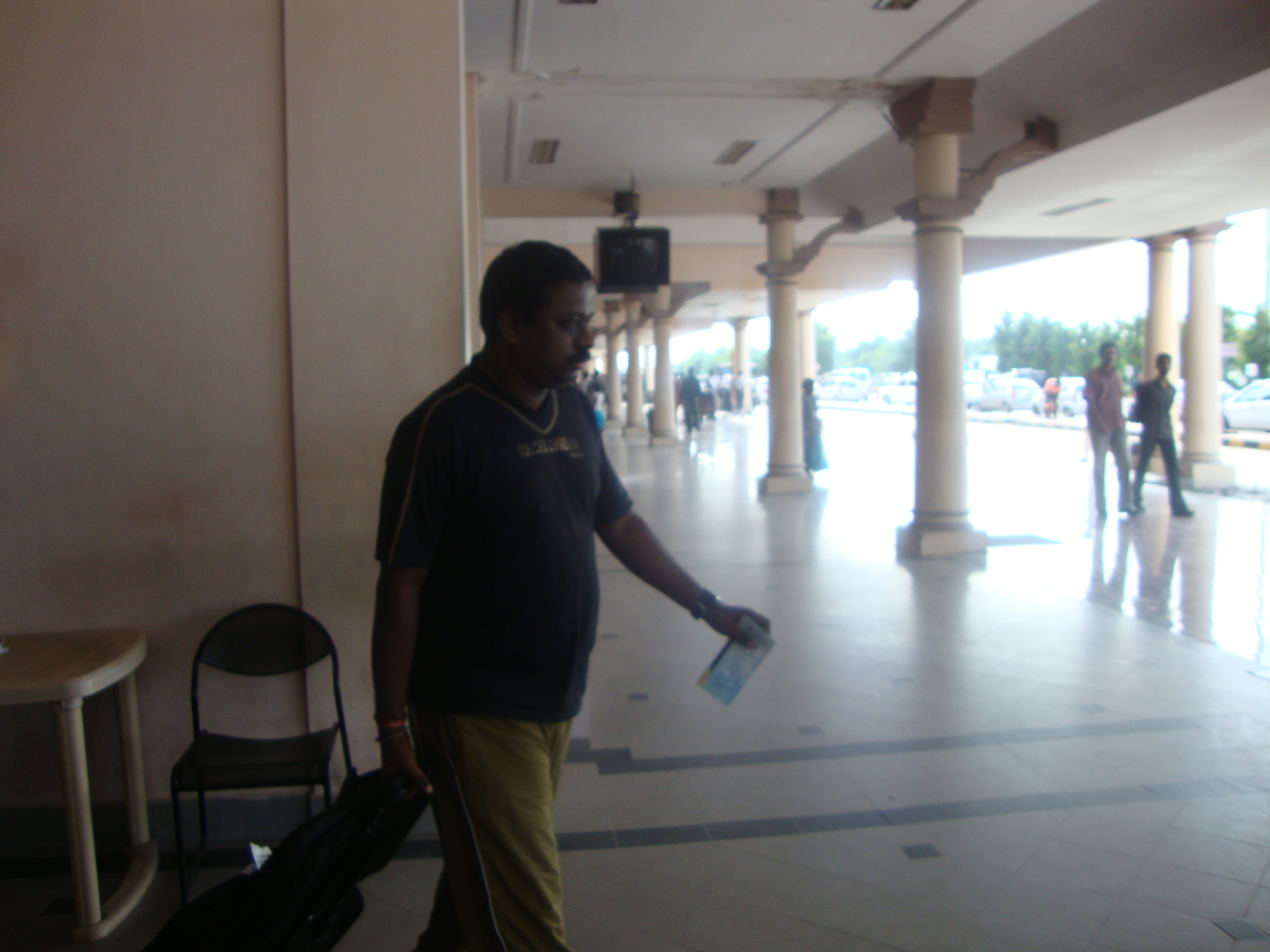
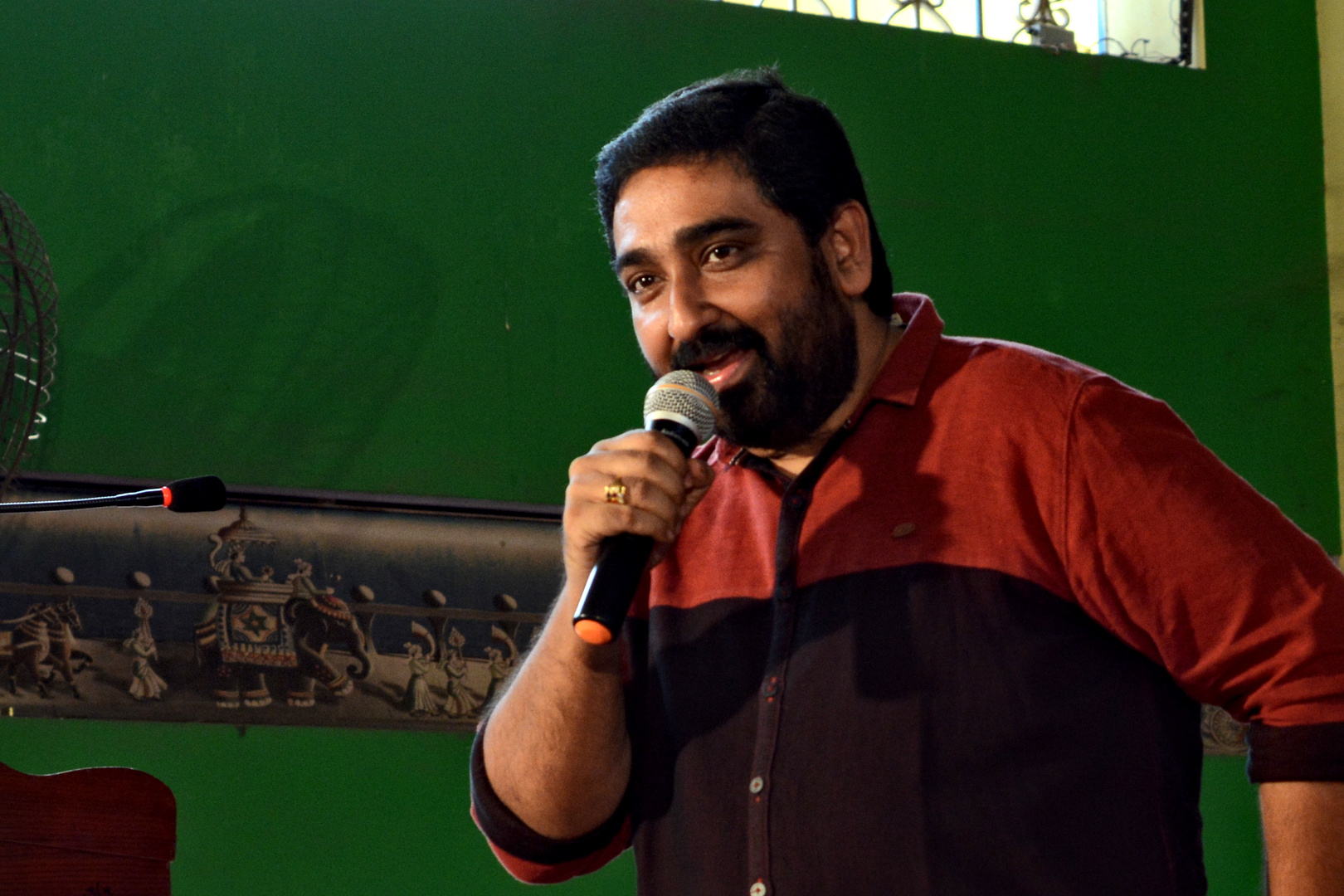
Language	Recipient	Film	Photo
Tamil	G. V. Prakash Kumar	Aadukalam
Telugu	Ilaiyaraaja	Sri Rama Rajyam
Kannada	Jassie Gift	Sanju Weds Geetha
Malayalam	M. Jayachandran	Rathinirvedam

2012

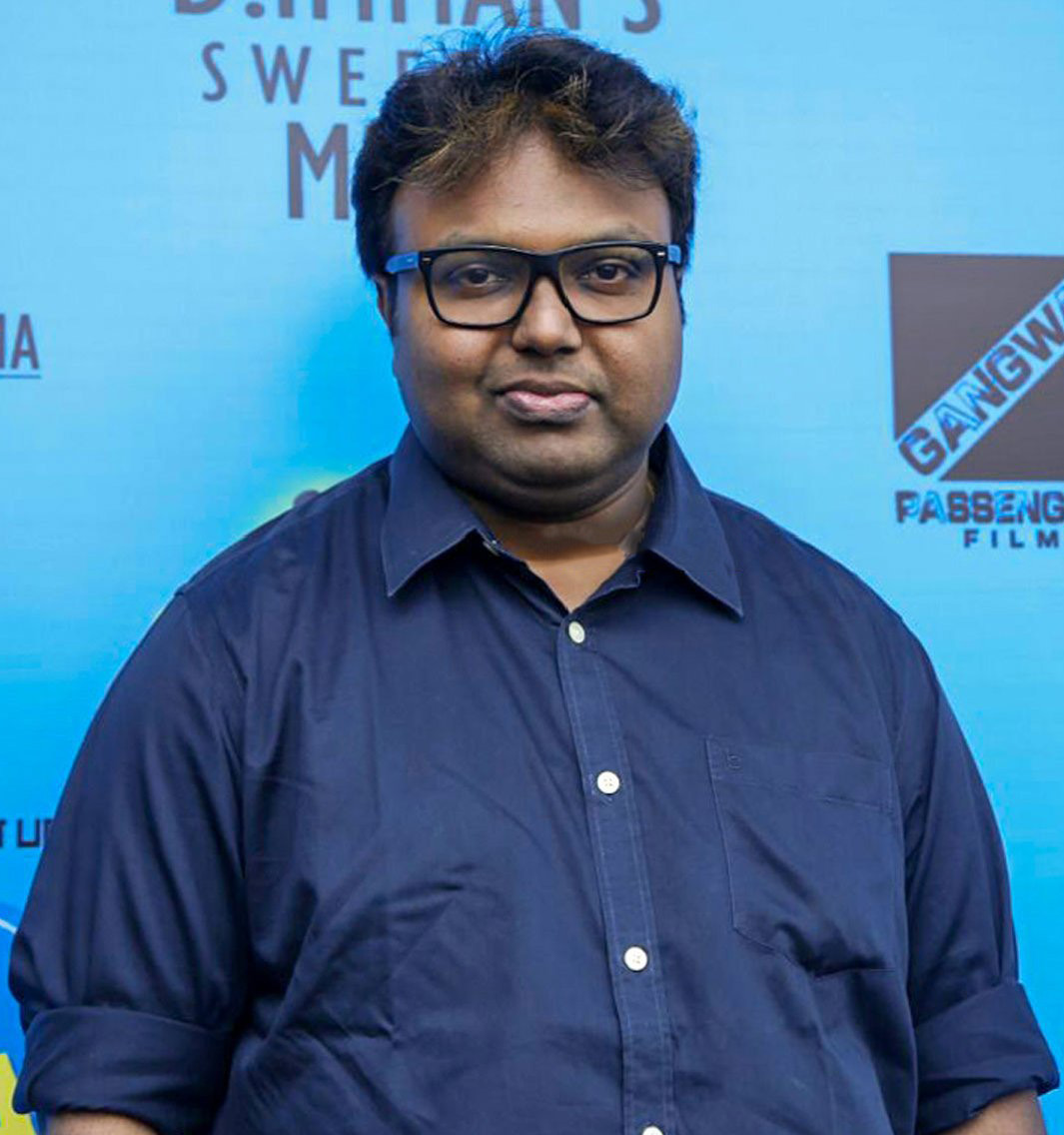
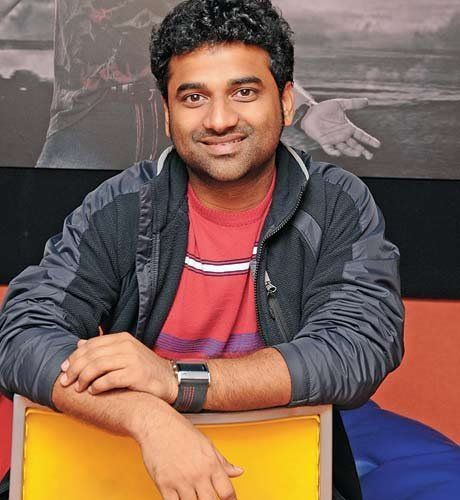
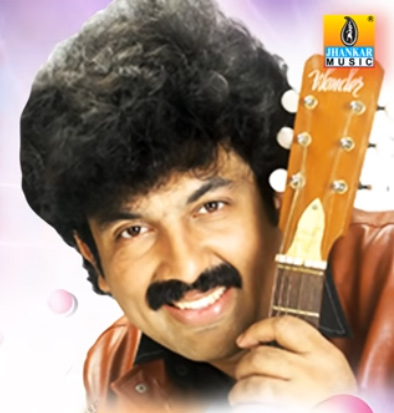
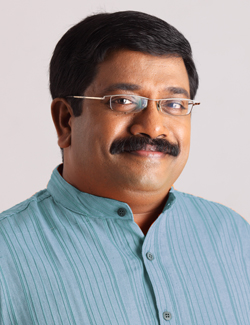
Language	Recipient	Film	Photo
Tamil	D. Imman	Kumki
Telugu	Devi Sri Prasad	Gabbar Singh
Kannada	Gurukiran	Govindaya Namaha
Malayalam	Sharreth	Ivan Megharoopan

2013

Language	Recipient	Film	Photo
Tamil
Telugu
Kannada
Malayalam

2014

Language	Recipient	Film	Photo
Tamil
Telugu
Kannada
Malayalam

2015

Language	Recipient	Film	Photo
Tamil
Telugu
Kannada
Malayalam

2021

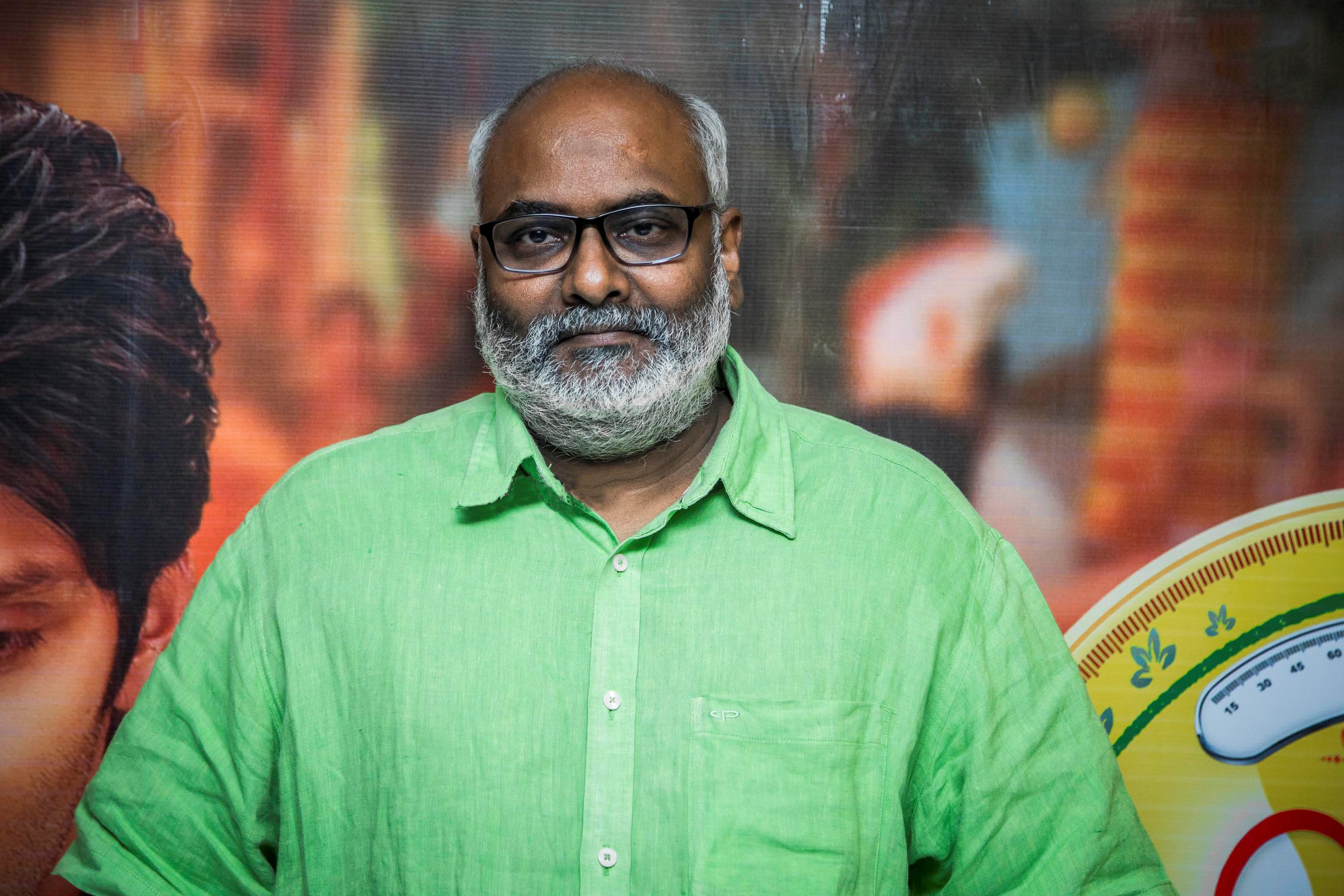
Language	Recipient	Film	Photo
Tamil
Telugu	MM Keeravani	Baahubali 2: The Conclusion
Kannada
Malayalam

=== Mannin Kural - Male ===
This award is given only to the Tamil music industry.

Year	Recipient	Song	Film	Photo
2009	Velmurugan	Adunga Da	Nadodigal
2010	Solar Sai	Jing Jika	Mynaa
2011	Jayamoorthy	Thanjavuru Maadathi	Vaagai Sooda Vaa
2012	Krishnaraj, Velmurugan & Sathyan	Aambalaikum Pombalaikum	Kazhugu

=== Manin Kural - Female ===
This award is given only to the Tamil music industry.

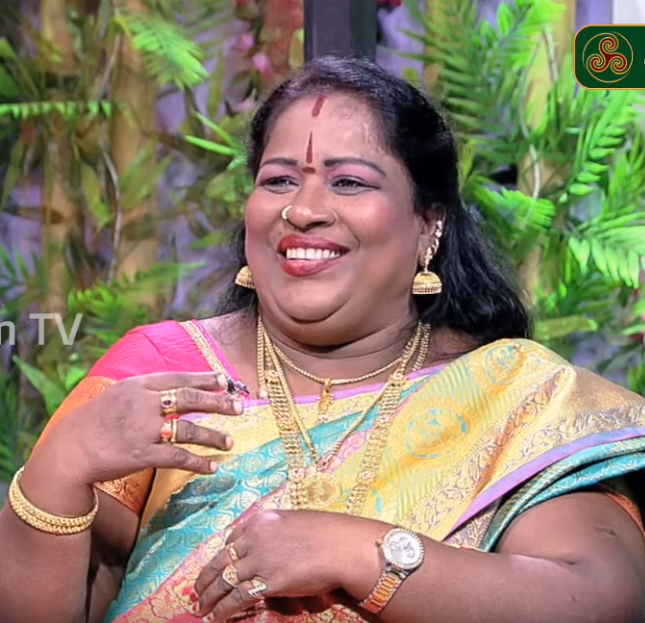
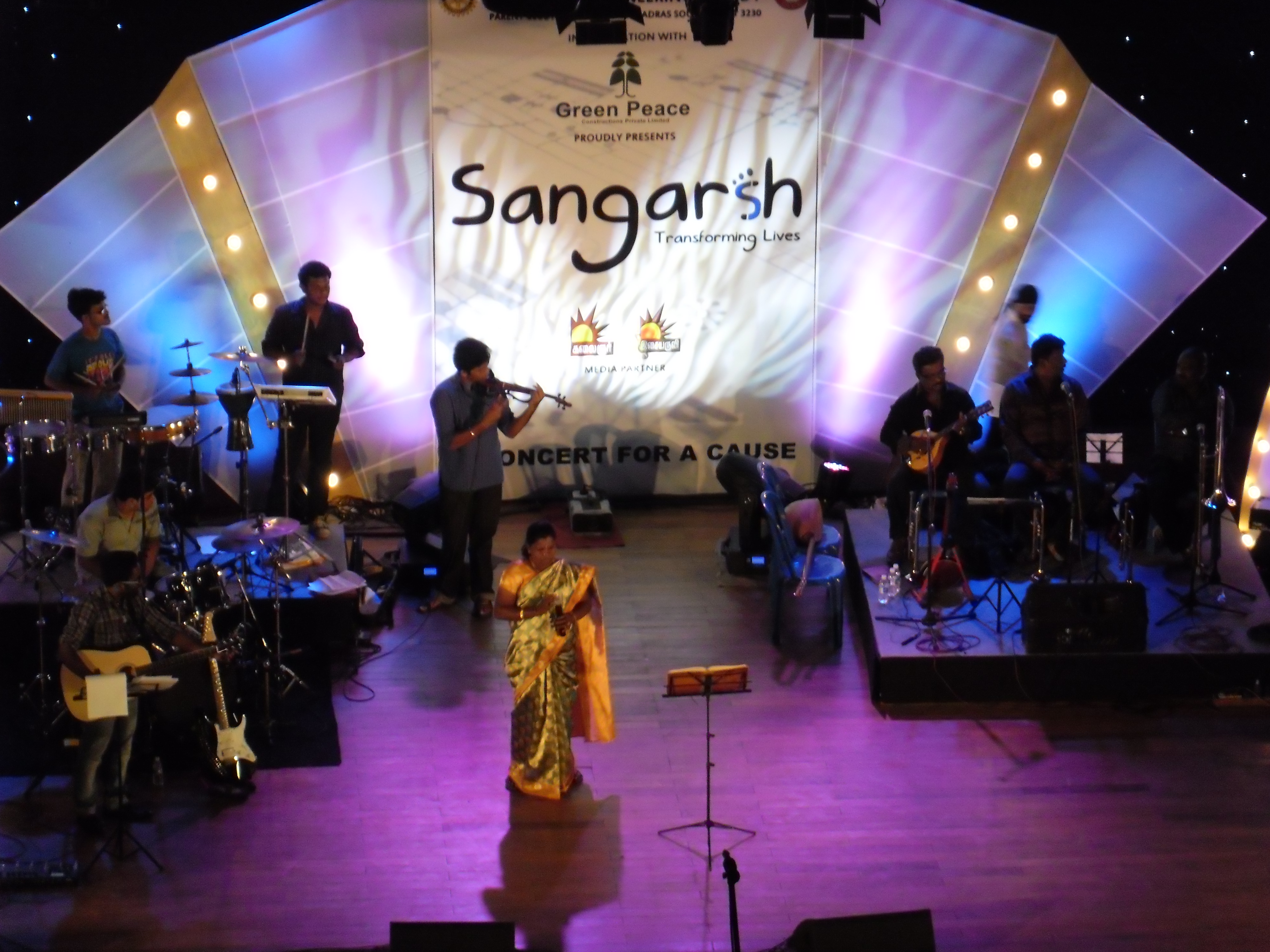
Year	Recipient	Song	Film
2009	Chinna Ponnu	Thaeka Thaeka	Suriyan Satta Kalloori
2010	Thanjai Selvi	Jilla Vittu	Eesan
2011	Anitha	Senga Solla Kaara	Vaagai Sooda Vaa
2012	Magizhini Manimaaran	Soi Soi	Kumki

== Listeners' Choice Award ==
=== Mirchi Listeners' Choice - Album of the Year ===
2009

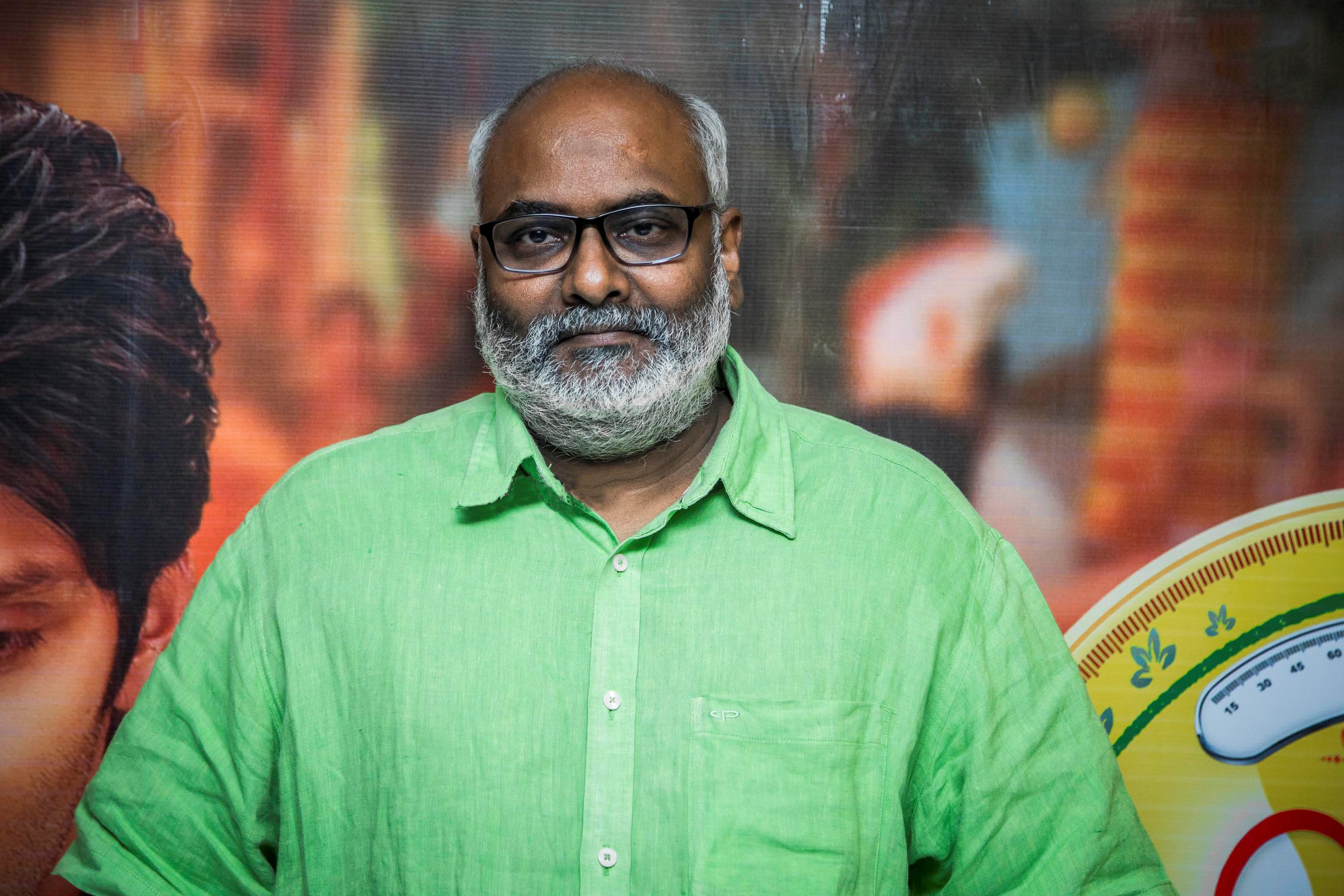
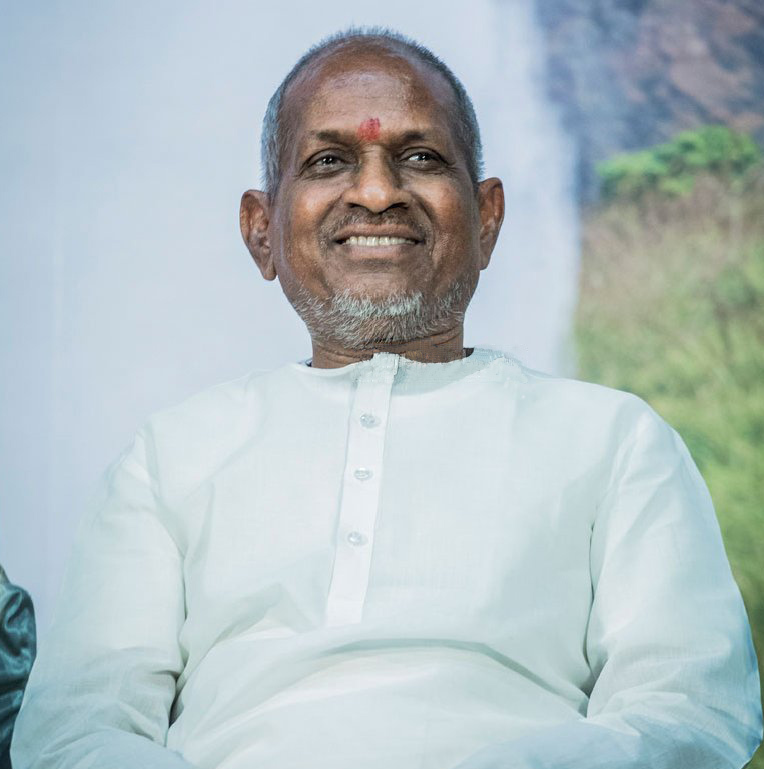
Language	Recipient	Film	Photo
Tamil	Harris Jayaraj	Ayan
Telugu	M. M. Keeravani	Magadheera
Kannada	Mano Murthy	Manasaare
Malayalam	Ilaiyaraja	Pazhassi Raja

2010

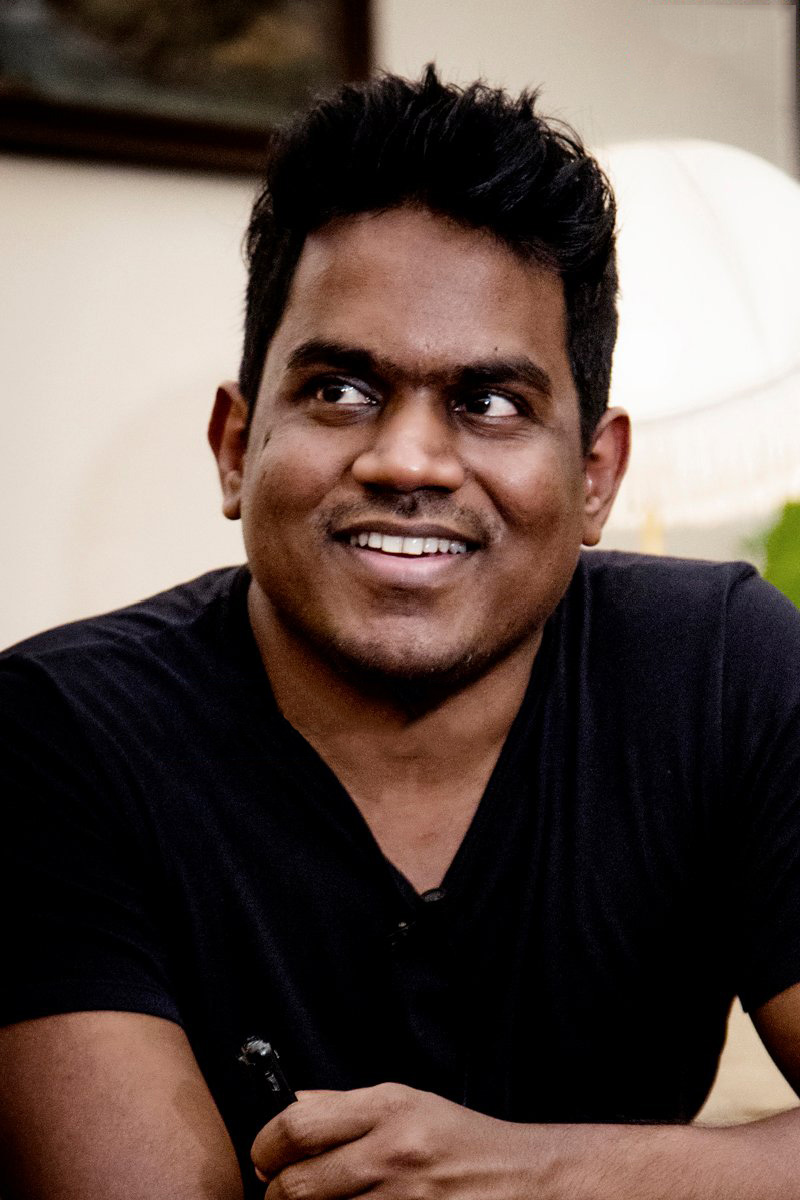
Language	Recipient	Film	Photo
Tamil	Yuvan Shankar Raja	Paiyaa
Telugu	Harris Jayaraj	Orange
Kannada	Sridhar V. Sambhram	Krishnan Love Story
Malayalam	Gopi Sundar	Anwar

2011

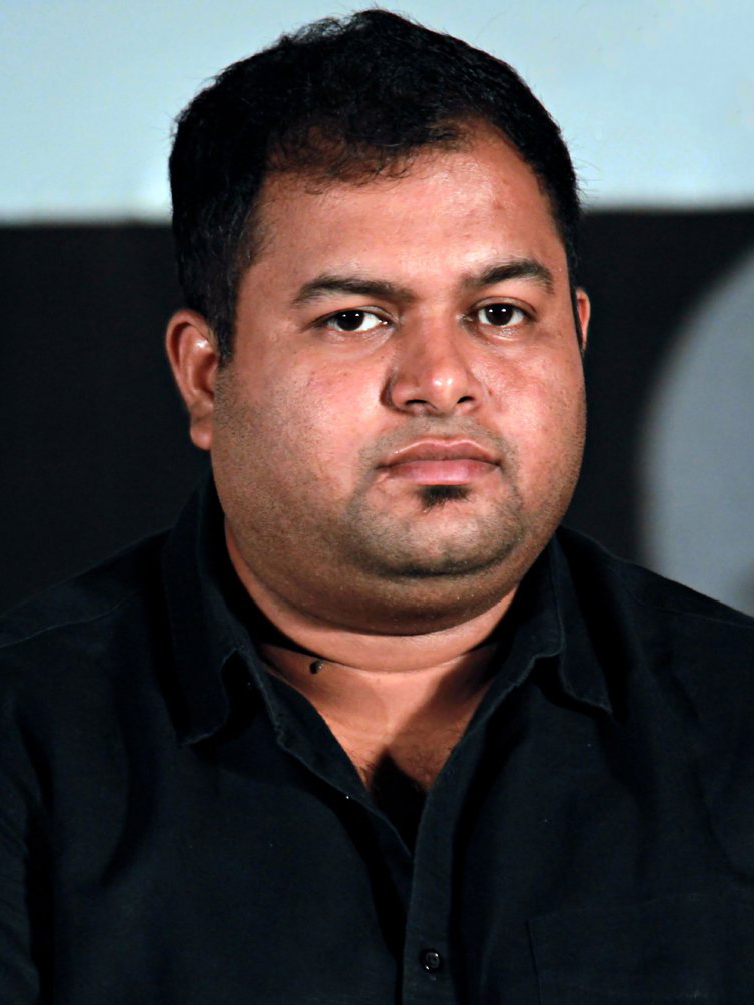
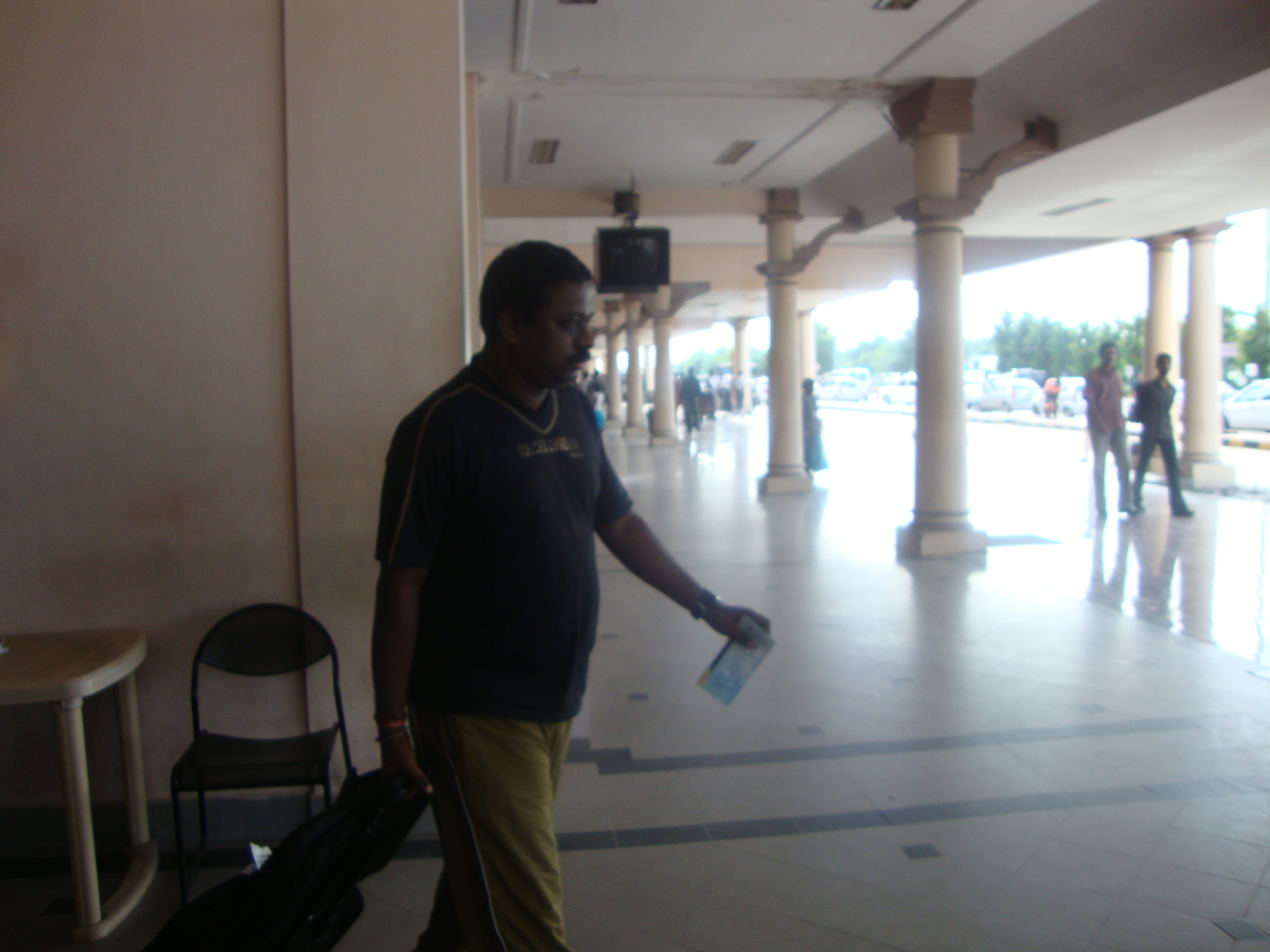
Language	Recipient	Film	Photo
Tamil	G. V. Prakash Kumar	Aadukalam
Telugu	S. Thaman	Dookudu
Kannada	Jassie Gift	Sanju Weds Geetha
Malayalam

2012

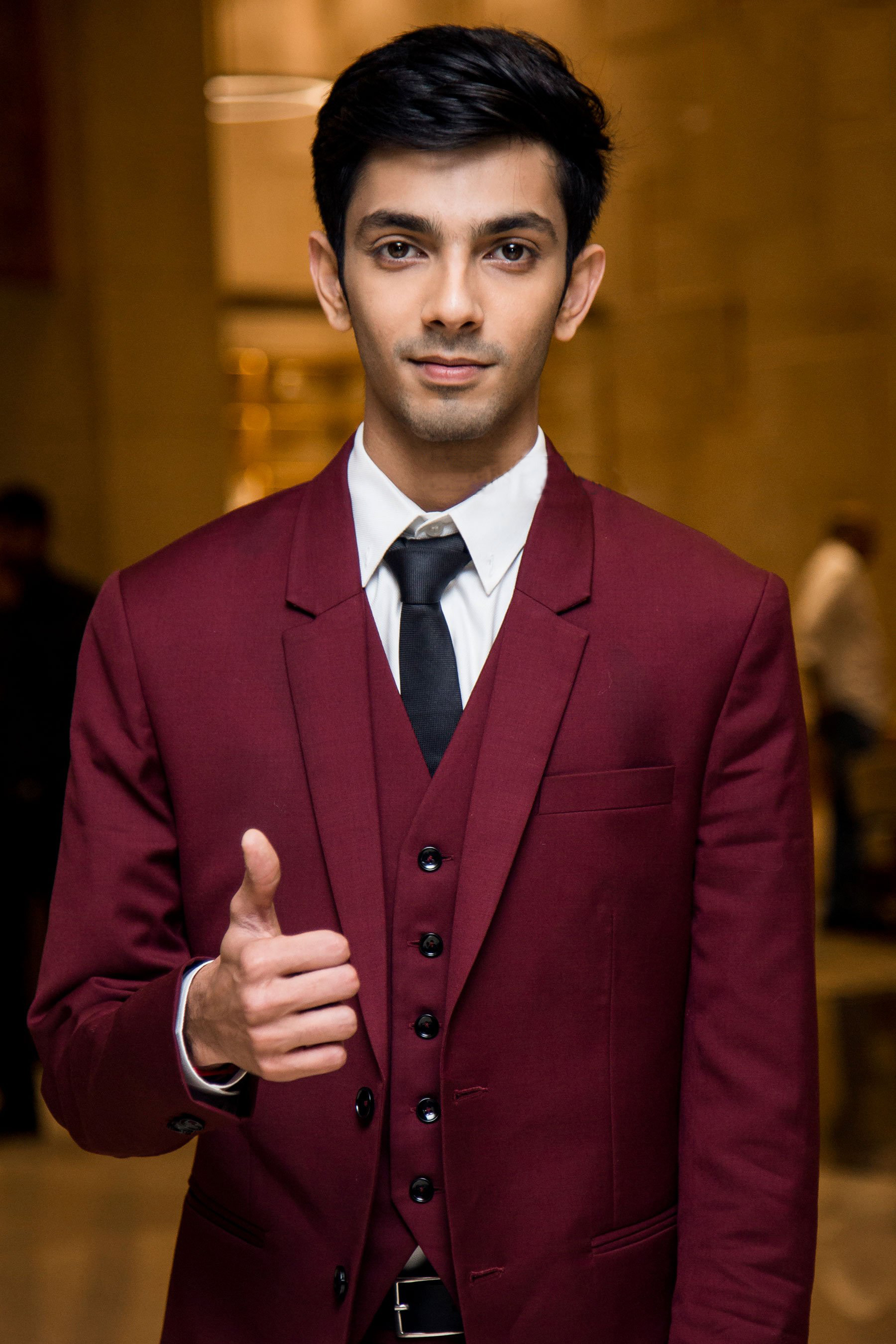
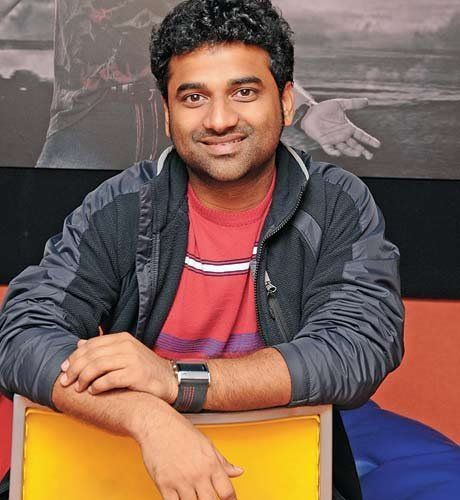
Language	Recipient	Film	Photo
Tamil	Anirudh Ravichander	3
Telugu	Devi Sri Prasad	Gabbar Singh
Kannada	V. Harikrishna	Addhuri
Malayalam	Shaan Rahman	Thattathin Marayathu

2015

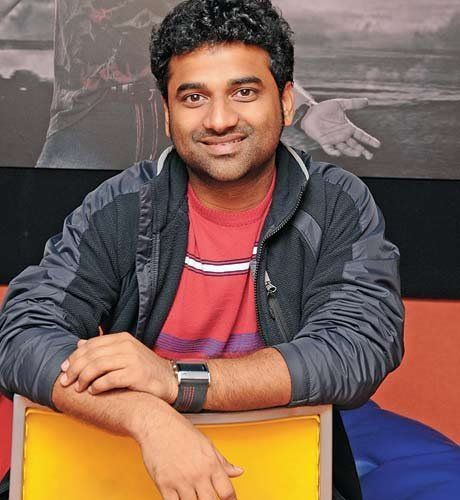
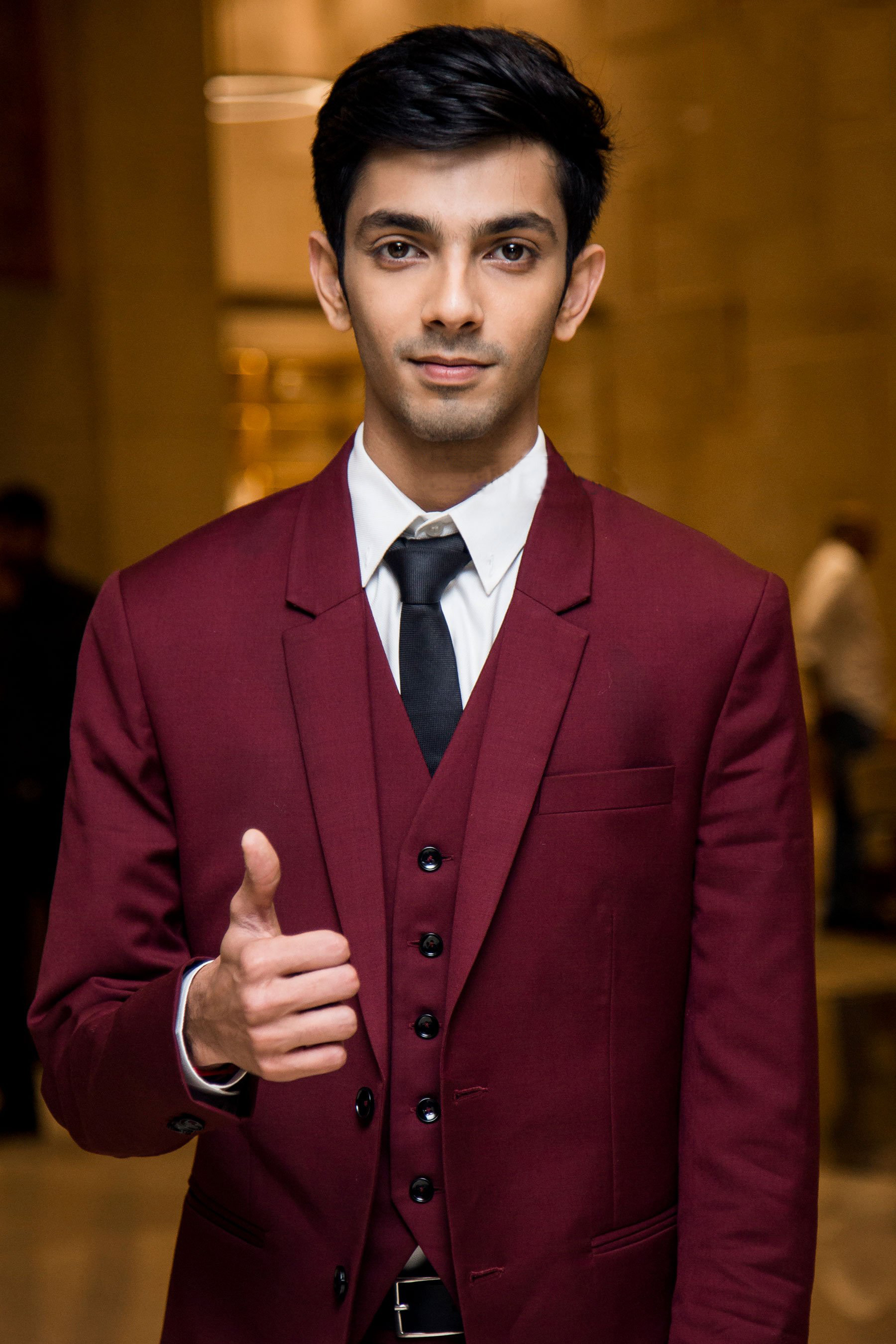
Language	Recipient	Film	Photo
Telugu	Devi Sri Prasad	S/O Satyamurthy
Tamil	Anirudh Ravichander	Naanum Rowdy Dhaan
Kannada	V. Sridhar	Krishnaleela
Malayalam	Gopi Sundar	Charlie

2021

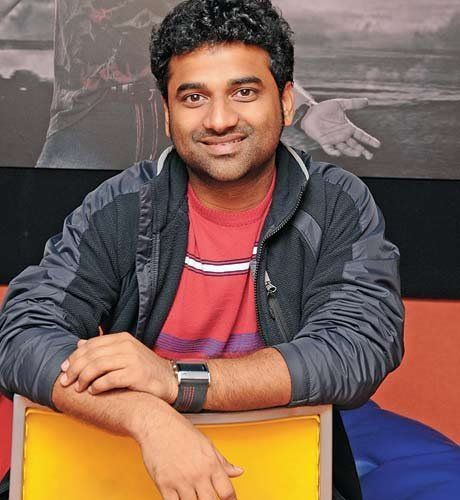
Language	Recipient	Film	Photo
Tamil
Telugu	Devi Sri Prasad	Attarintiki Daredi
Kannada
Malayalam

=== Mirchi Listeners' Choice - Song of the Year ===
2009

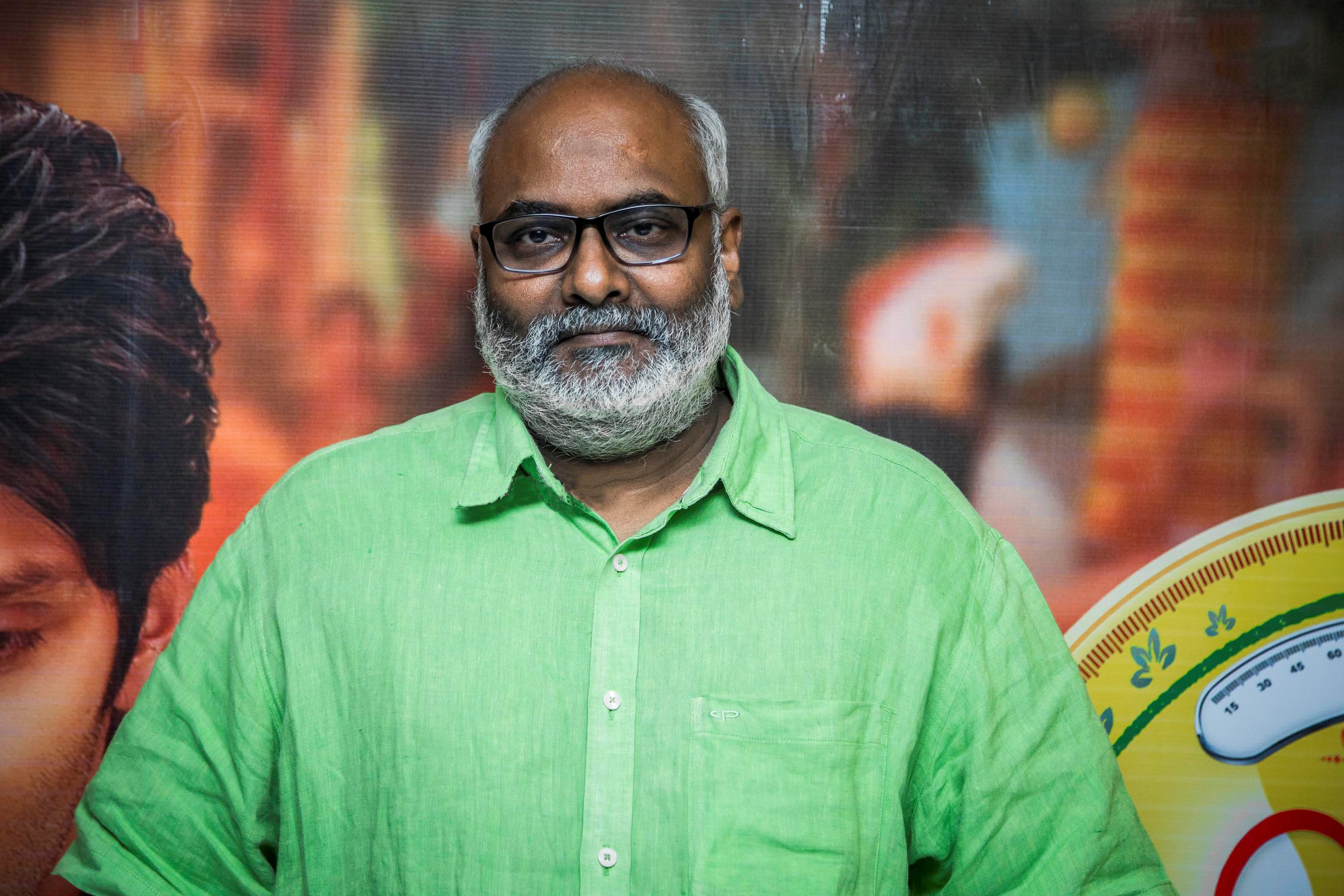
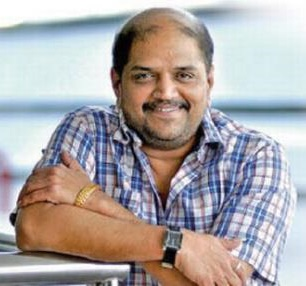
Language	Recipient	Song	Film	Photo
Tamil	Vijay Antony	Azhagai Pookuthey	Ninaithale Inikkum
Telugu	M. M. Keeravani	Panchadhara Bomma	Magadheera
Kannada	Manikanth Kadri	Marali Mareyagi	Savari
Malayalam	Vidyasagar	Anuraaga	Neelathamara

2010

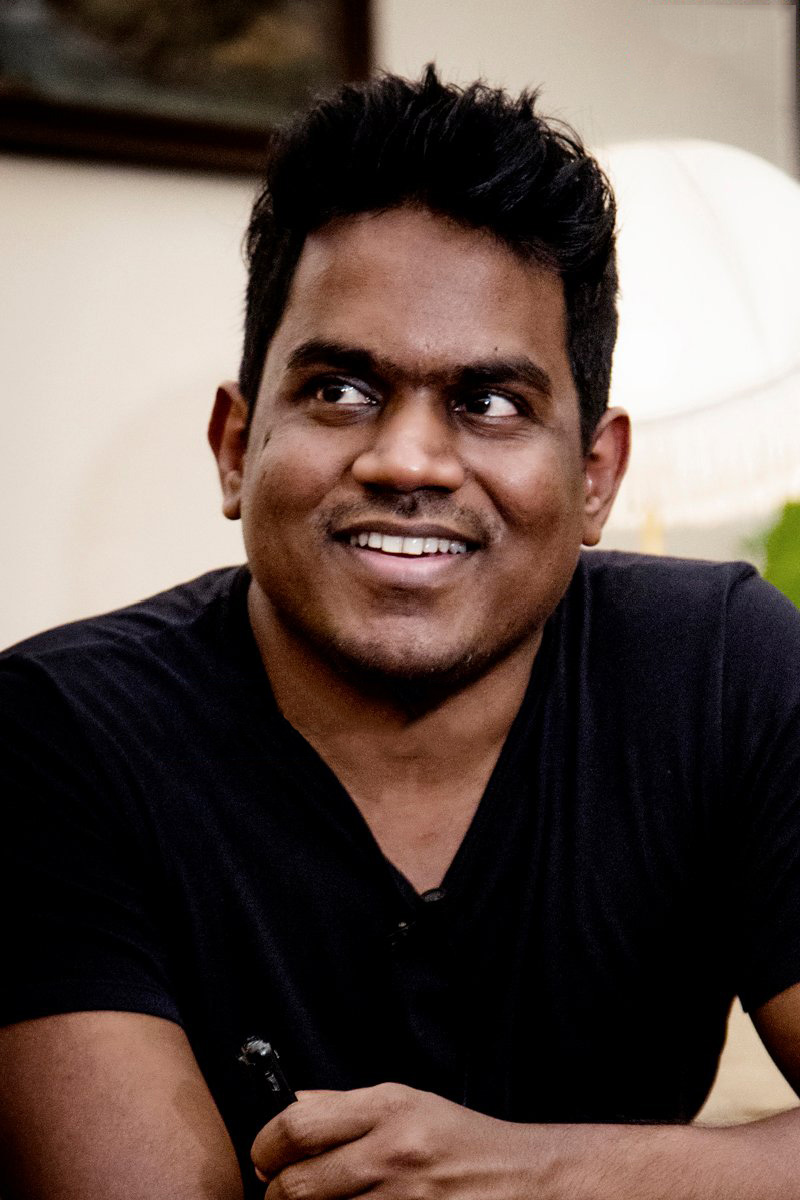
Language	Recipient	Song	Film	Photo
Tamil	Yuvan Shankar Raja	En Kadhal Solla	Paiyaa
Telugu	Harris Jayaraj	Nenu Nuvvantu	Orange
Kannada	Sridhara V. Sambhram	Hrudayave Bayaside	Krishnan Love Story
Malayalam	Gopi Sundar	Kizhakku Pookum	Anwar

2011

Language	Recipient	Song	Film	Photo
Tamil
Telugu
Kannada
Malayalam

2012

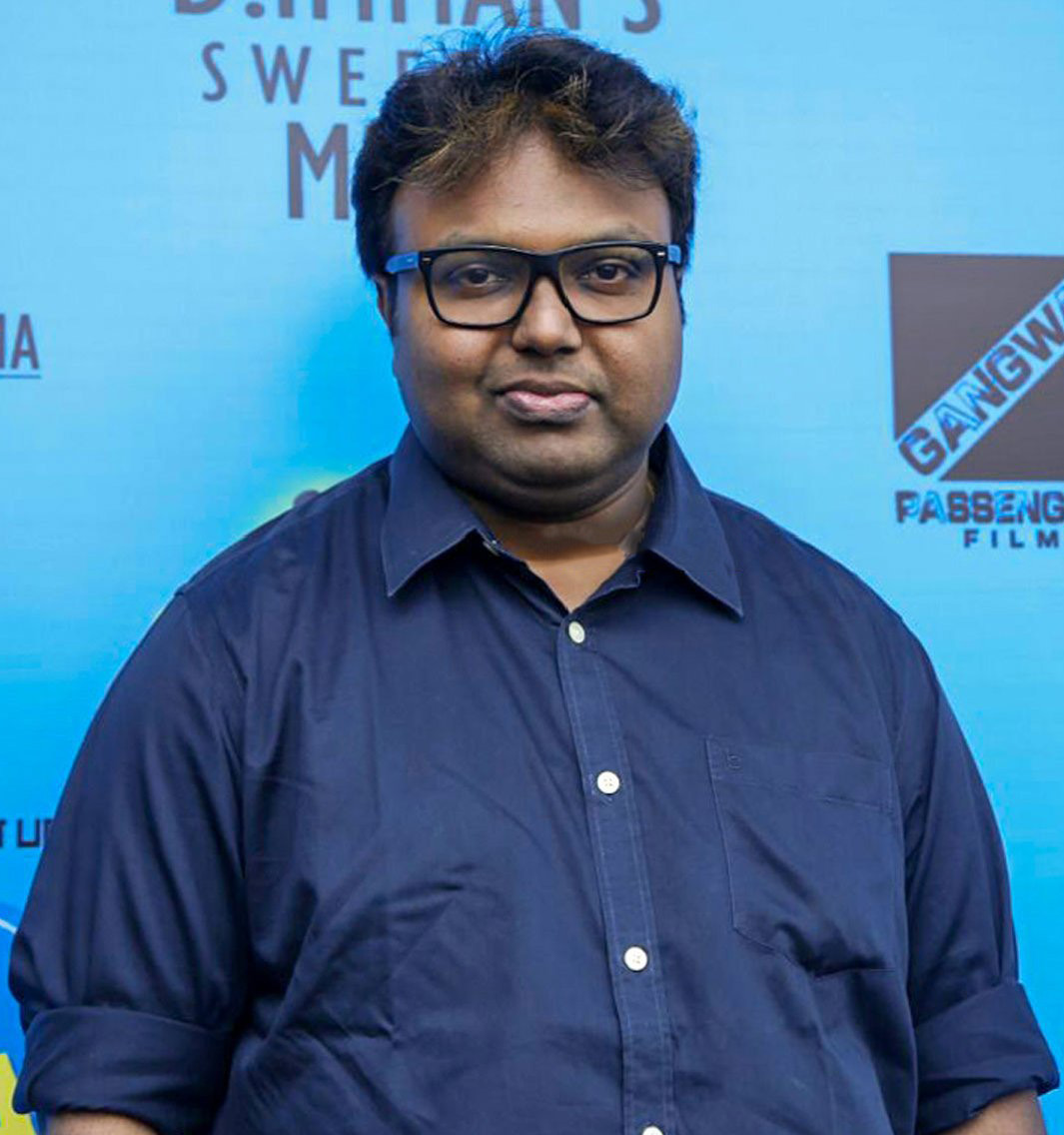
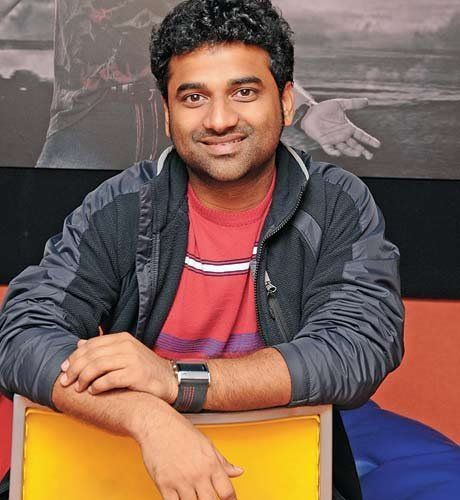
Language	Recipient	Song	Film	Photo
Tamil	D. Imman	Sollitaley Ava Kaadhala	Kumki
Telugu	Devi Sri Prasad	Kevvu Keka	Gabbar Singh
Kannada	Arjun Janya	Aalochane	Romeo
Malayalam	Ouseppachan	Azhalinte Azhangalil	Ayalum Njanum Thammil

2016

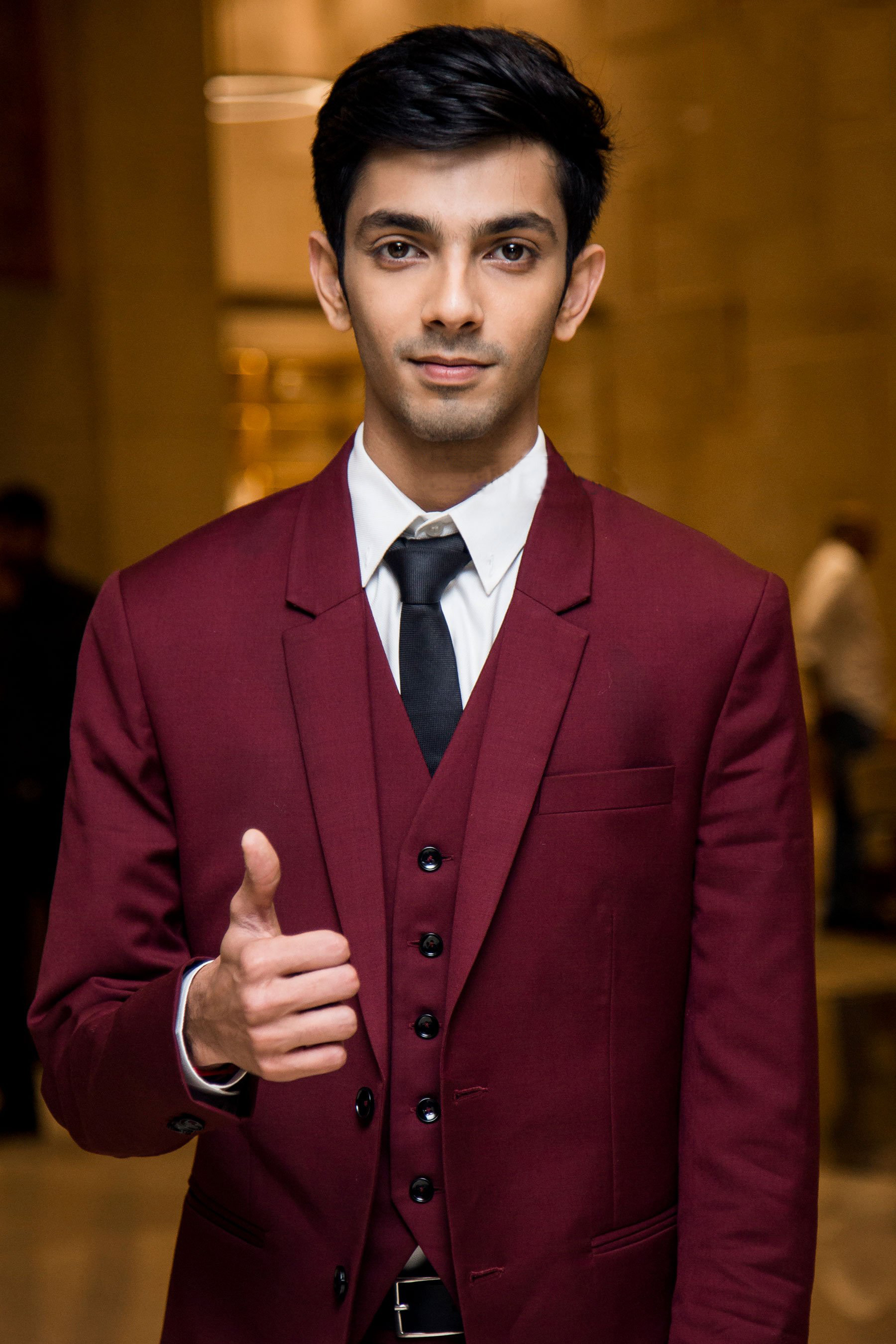
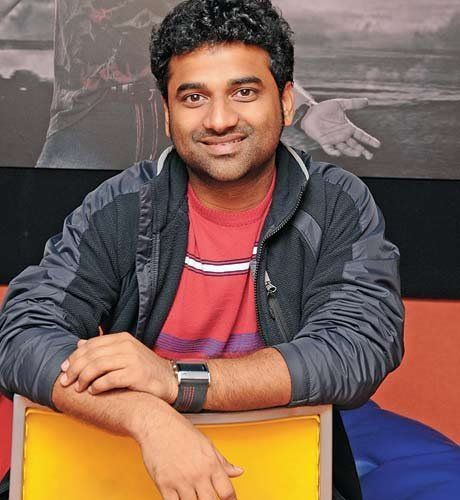
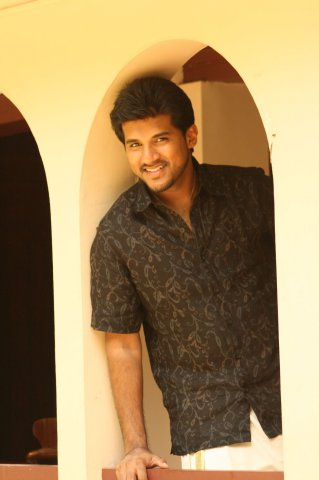
Language	Recipient	Song	Film	Photo
Tamil	Anirudh Ravichander	Thangamey	Naanum Rowdy Dhaan
Telugu	Devi Sri Prasad	Super Machi	S/o satyamurthy
Kannada	Tippu	Krishna calling	Krishnaleela
Malayalam	Vijay Yesudas	Malare	Premam

== Technical awards ==
=== Technical Sound Engineer Award ===
2009

Language	Recipient	Song	Film	Photo
Tamil	Uday Kumar	Excuse Me	Kanthaswamy
Telugu	Uday	Upenentha	Aarya 2
Kannada	Smithampan	Ale Ale	Savaari
Malayalam	Sam Devassy	Madhuram Ghayathi	Banaras

2010

Language	Recipient	Song	Film	Photo
Tamil	Ramji and Guru	Idhu Varai	Goa
Telugu	Ramesh	Rooba Rooba	Orange
Kannada	Ramesh	Shiva Antha Hogutidde	Jackie
Malayalam	Gopi Sundar	Kizhakku Pookum	Anwar

2011

Language	Recipient	Song	Film	Photo
Tamil	Kumaraguru Paran	Vilaiyaadu Mankatha	Mankatha
Telugu	Murali	Jagadhananda Karaka	Sri Rama Rajyam
Kannada	S. Ramesh	Paravasha Naadenu	Paramathma
Malayalam	Renjith Rajan	Paattil Ee Paattil	Pranayam

2012

Language	Recipient	Song	Film	Photo
Tamil	Kausikan Sivalingam & Özgür İkinci	Gangster	Billa II
Telugu	Nene Naaneene	G Jeevan Babu	Eega
Kannada	Hareendranath Dwarak Warrier	Namdukke Pyarge	Govindaya Namaha
Malayalam	Balu Thankachan	Appangal	Ustad Hotel

== Special awards ==
=== Jury Award for Outstanding Contribution to Film Music Industry ===
2009

Language	Recipient	Reason	Photo
Tamil	R. Govardhanam	Music conductor / music composer (75 years)
Telugu	Pandit Janardhan	Sitar
Kannada	Balesh	Shehnai
Malayalam	Rex Issacs	Violin

2010

Language	Recipient	Reason	Photo
Tamil	Philips	Overall contribution
Telugu	Seenu	Santoor
Kannada	Venu	Tabla
Malayalam	Balan	Tabla

2011

Language	Recipient	Reason	Photo
Tamil	Tabla Prasad	Tabla
Telugu	Alan D'Costa	Rhythms
Kannada	Palani D. Senapati	Music
Malayalam	Jerson Antony	Music director

2012

Language	Recipient	Reason	Photo
Tamil	Emanuel	Emmy sound recordist
Telugu	Chinna Prasad	Tabla
Kannada	Faiyaz Khan
Malayalam	Michael	Tabla/ mridangam

=== Lifetime Achievement Award ===
2009

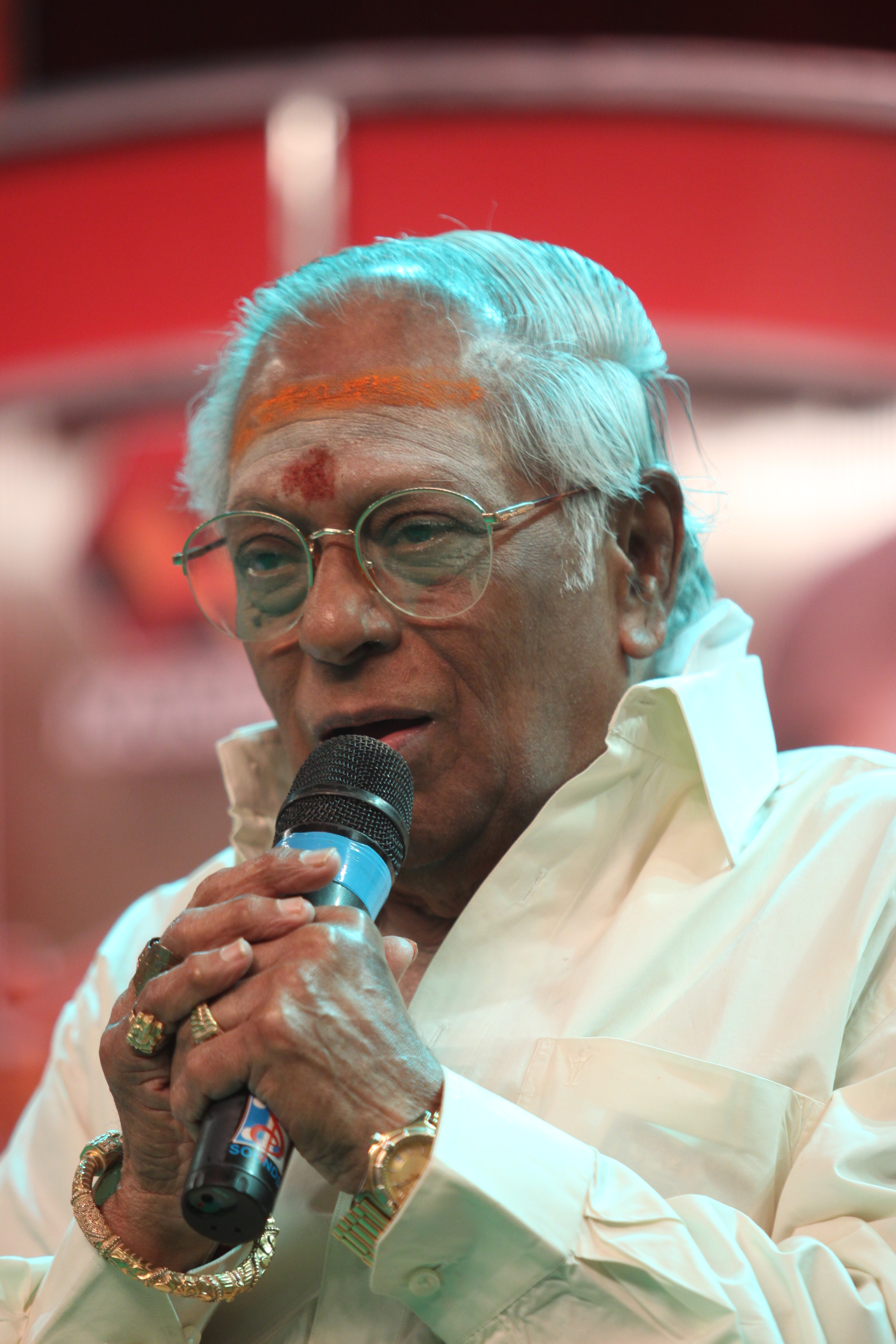
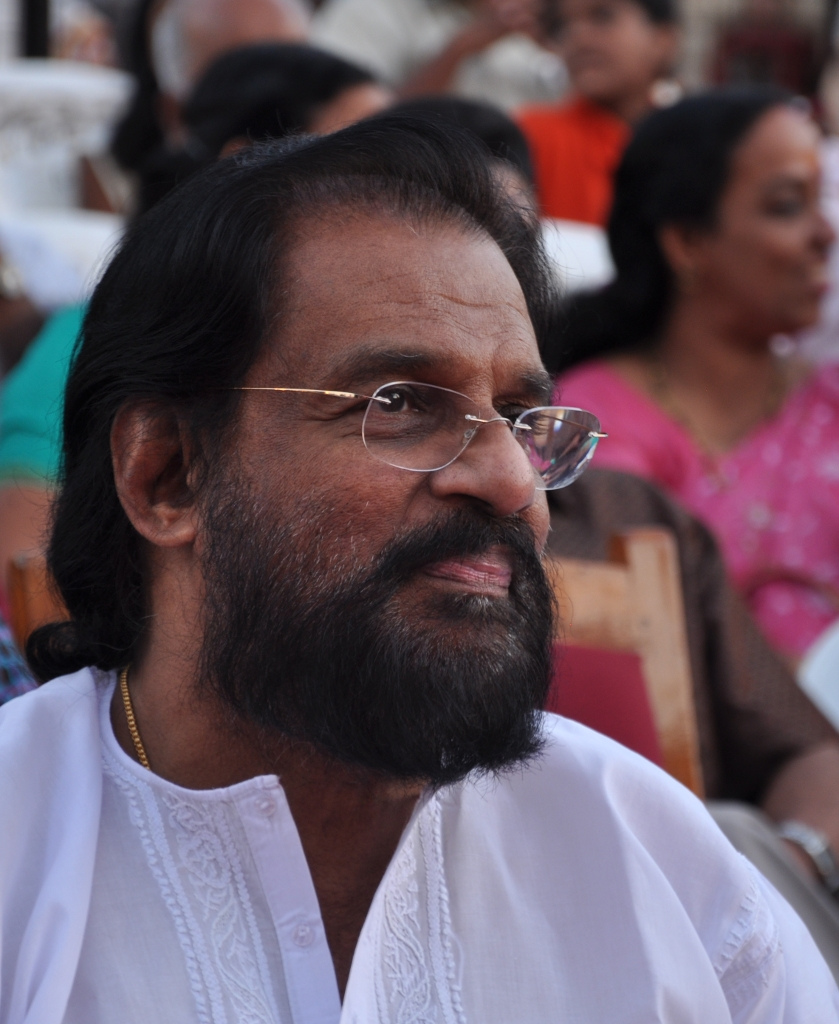
Language	Recipient	Photo
Tamil	M. S. Viswanathan
Telugu	Bala Saraswati Rao
Kannada	P. B. Sreenivas
Malayalam	K. J. Yesudas

2010

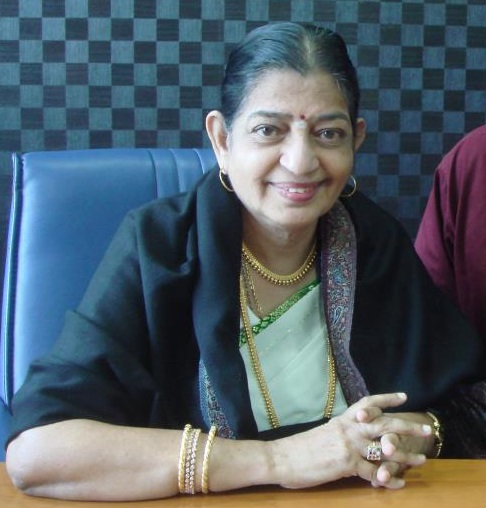
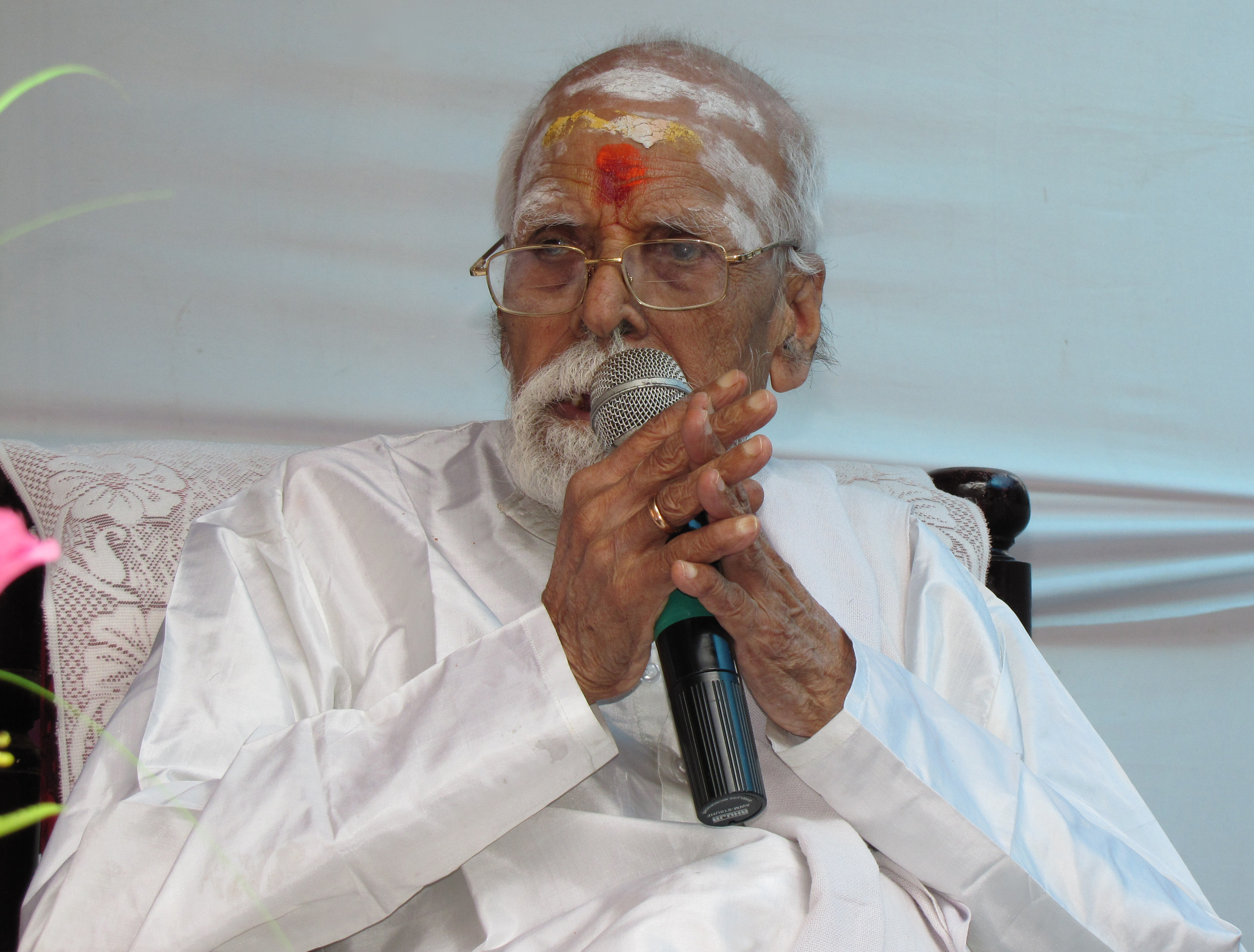
Language	Recipient	Photo
Tamil	P. Susheela
Telugu	Susarla Dakshinamurthi
Kannada	Rajan
Malayalam	V. Dakshinamurthy

2011

Language	Recipient	Photo
Tamil
Telugu	Koti
Kannada	Geethapriya
Malayalam

== See also ==
- Mirchi Music Awards
- Radio Mirchi
