= Invenio Origin =

Film Production and Distribution Company

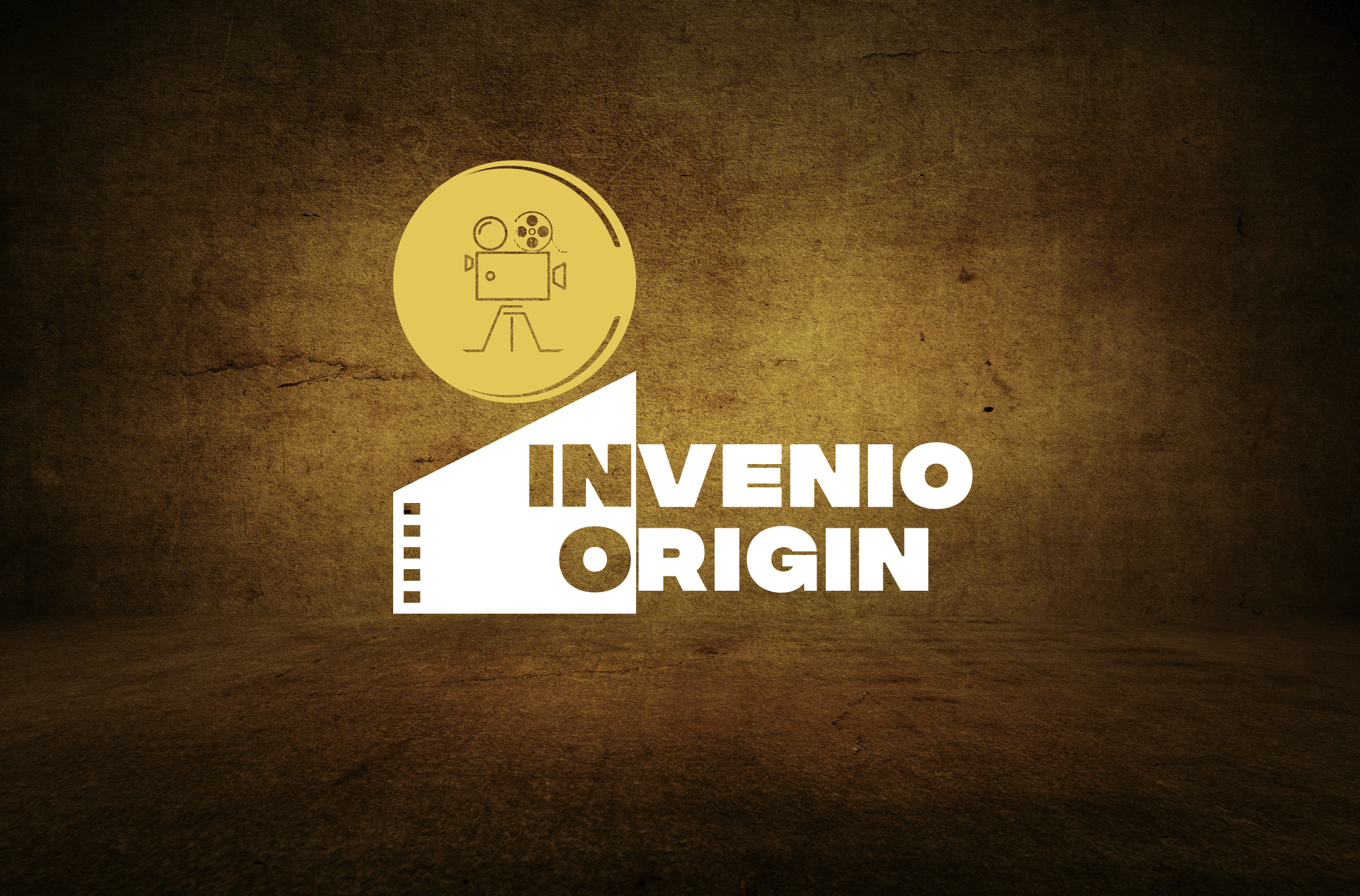
- Industry: Entertainment
- Founded: 2018
- Founder: Alankar Pandian
- Headquarters: Dubai, United Arab Emirates
- Key people: Alankar Pandian; Akash Alankar; Bhaskar M Simha
- Products: Film production; Film distribution
- Owner: Alankar Pandian
- Subsidiaries: Invenio Films India
- Website: invenioorigin.com/

Invenio Origin is a Dubai-based film distribution company that also, has its presence in Singapore and India, produces Indian films, primarily in South India under its banner Invenio Films India. It is headed by Alankar Pandian.

== History ==
=== Films and TV ===
Invenio Origin's foray into film production began in 2018 with the Kannada cinema, 'The Terrorist' which had Ragini Dwivedi in the lead role and was directed by PC Shekar. Invenio Origin has been associated with notable films like Ayushman Bhava, Vikrant Rona, Kabzaa, Jigartanda Double X, Rathnam and others.

On the television front, Invenio Origin has co-produced the regional versions of Masterchef Australia in Tamil and Telugu.

In January 2024, Invenio Origin joined hands with R Chandru announcing five back to back productions. The titles announced were Father, POK, Sri Ramabana Chirita, Dog, and Kabzaa 2.

In the month of October 2024, Invenio Origin, struck an association with magnum opus Martin film team to release this movie across the country.

=== Related ventures ===
In January 2024, With South Indian International Movie Awards (SIIMA) completing 12 years and Celebrity Cricket League (CCL) gearing up for its 10th season, Alankar Pandian and Invenio Origin joins forces with the founder of SIIMA and CCL Vishnu Vardhan Induri, as the strategic partner with significant stake in SIIMA & CCL, to scale-up these formats, and to launch a New Pan India Media IP called Indian National Cine Academy (INCA) (first OTT Streaming Academy Awards, involving all Languages were held at Mumbai on 21 July).

Setup with the intention of bridging the gap across various regional industries of the Indian film industry to enable better cross-industry collaborations, interconnected opportunities and shared growth, the Indian National Cine Academy (INCA) is a key venture of Invenio Origin.

On 20 June 2024, Invenio Origin has announced partnership with Gilly's Restaurants & Pubs as a strategic investor. As a result of this tie up, Gilly's Restobar at Electronic city and St Marks Road have been renovated and now termed as Gilly's Super Bar.

Invenio Origin joined hands with KVN Productions to support India's first premium certified AV and electronic Marketplace, www.budbee.in. This venture was also been backed by Rishikesh SR of Rapido.

Invenio Origin invested in the hospitality sector in India through 7 Tigers Hospitality Private Limited. The company operates multiple hospitality venues in Bengaluru under brands including BudBee 104 Club, BudBee Restobar, DOLOs Bar & Kitchen, Zodiac Bar & Kitchen, Happy Brew, BOHO Koramangala, BOHO Hebbal, BOHO Sarjapura and Queen Koramangala with establishments located in areas such as Koramangala, JP Nagar, Marathahalli, Sarjapura and Manyata Tech Park.

== Filmography ==
=== Film ===
Key
| † | Denotes films that have not yet been released |

| Year | Title | Director | Language | Role | Ref |
|---|---|---|---|---|---|
| 2018 | The Terrorist | PC Shekhar | Kannada | Producer | |
| 2019 | Ayushman Bhava | P. Vasu | Kannada | Co-production | |
| 2021 | Thinkalazhcha Nishchayam | Senna Hegde | Malayalam | Distribution | |
| 2022 | Vikrant Rona | Anup Bhandari | Kannada | Co-production | |
| 2023 | Kabzaa | R. Chandru | Kannada | Co-production | |
| 2023 | Jigarthanda DoubleX | Karthik Subbaraj | Tamil | Co-production | |
| 2024 | Rathnam | Hari | Tamil | Co-production | |
| 2024 | Martin | A. P. Arjun | Kannada | Distribution | |
| TBA | Kannivedi † | Ganeshraj | Tamil | Co-production | |
| TBA | Rainbow † | Shantharuban | Tamil - Telugu Bilingual | Co-production | |

=== Television ===
| Year | Title | Language | Network | Ref |
|---|---|---|---|---|
| 2021 | MasterChef India - Tamil Season 1 | Tamil | Sun TV | |
| 2021 | MasterChef India - Telugu Season 1 | Telugu | Gemini TV Sun NXT | |
