= Endemol =

Former Dutch media company

Endemol B.V.
- Final logo used from 2001 to 2016

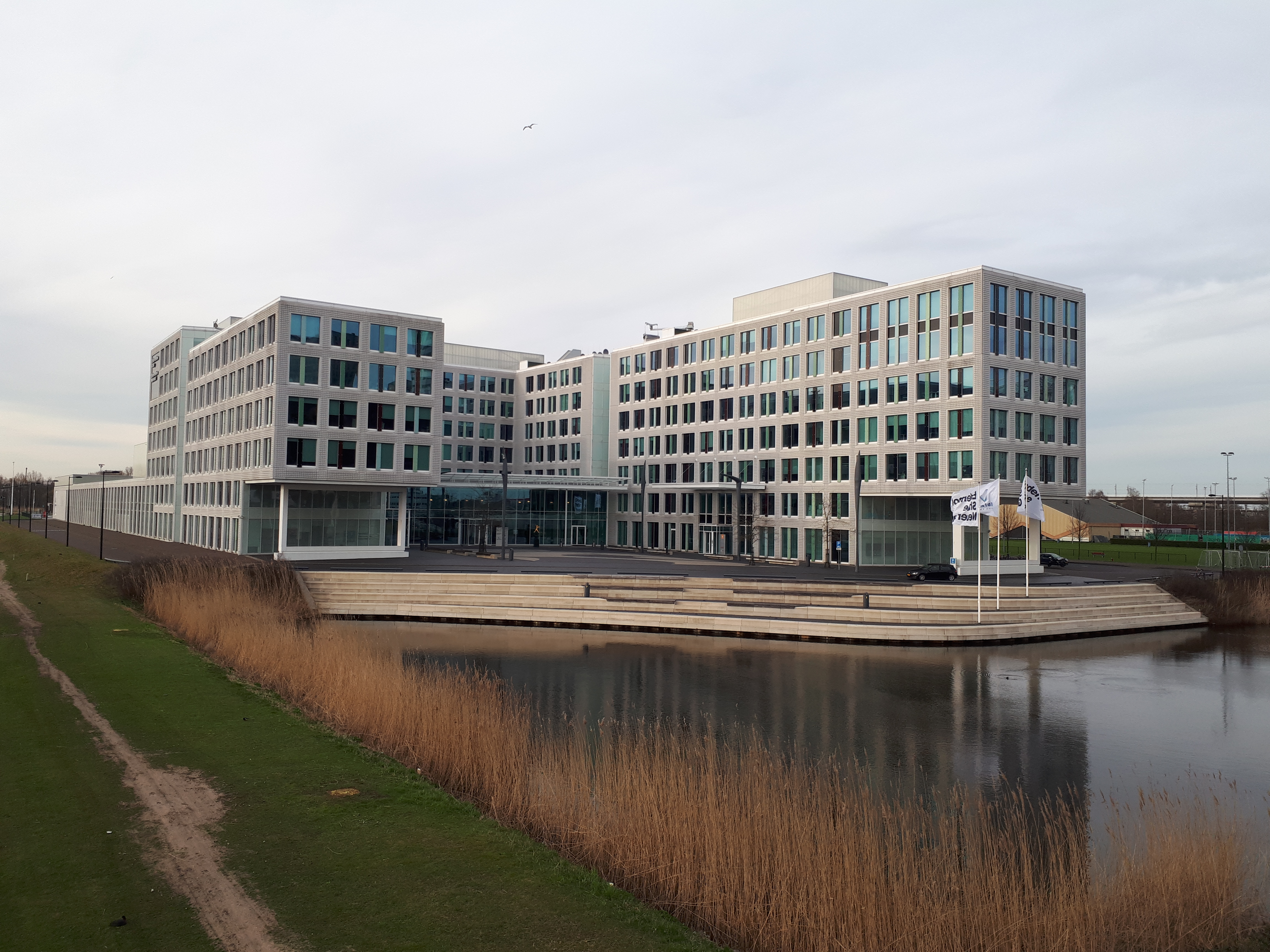
- The global headquarters of Endemol in Amsterdam
- Formerly: Endemol Entertainment B.V (1994-2001)
- Type: Subsidiary
- Traded as: Euronext Amsterdam: EML (2005-2007)
- Industry: Television production; Film distribution
- Predecessors: Joop van den Ende TV Productions (1989); John de Mol Productions (1992)
- Founded: 1 November 1994; 31 years ago
- Founders: Joop van den Ende; John de Mol
- Defunct: 16 July 2016; 10 years ago
- Fate: Merged with Shine Group to form Endemol Shine Group; Name still in use in Portugal
- Successor: Endemol Shine Group
- Headquarters: MediArena 1, Amsterdam, Netherlands
- Key people: Sophie Turner Laing (CEO)
- Parent: Telefónica (2000–2007); Mediaset (2007–2012); Apollo Global Management (2012–2015); Endemol Shine Group (2015–2016)
- Divisions: Endemol Asia; Endemol Australia; Endemol Argentina; Endemol Brasil; Endemol Beyond; Endemol Chile; Endemol Colombia; B&B Endemol; Endemol Deutschland; Endemol España; Endemol Games; Endemol France; Endemol Italia; Endemol India; Endemol Mexico; Endemol Middle East; Endemol Nederland; Endemol Nordics; Endemol Malaysia; Endemol Polska; Endemol Philippines; Endemol Portugal; Endemol Russia; Endemol South Africa; Endemol Turkey; Endemol UK; Endemol USA; Endemol Worldwide Distribution
- Subsidiaries: 51 Minds Entertainment; Artists Studio; Authentic Entertainment; Darlow Smithson Productions; Diagonal TV; Douglas Road Productions; Gestmusic; House of Tomorrow; Initial; Original Media; Remarkable Television; Reshet (33%); Telegenia; Tiger Aspect Productions; Tigress Productions; True Entertainment; YAM 112003; Zeppelin Television; Zeppotron
- Website: www.endemol.com (archived August 2015)

Endemol B.V. (stylized in all lowercase) was a Dutch-based media company that produced and distributed multiplatform entertainment content. The company annually produced more than 15,000 hours of programming across scripted and non-scripted genres, including drama, reality TV, comedy, game shows, entertainment, factual and children's programming.

Endemol, a global network of operations in more than 30 countries, worked with over 300 broadcasters, digital platforms and licensees worldwide. The business covered development, production, marketing, distribution, franchise management and multi-platform initiatives including digital video, gaming and apps.

Endemol was merged with Shine Group to form Endemol Shine Group (a joint-venture between the Walt Disney Company and Apollo Global Management) and headquartered in the Netherlands in 2015. Since the merger, Endemol is an in-name-only unit of Endemol Shine Group, and in the next years, Endemol's iconic eye logo was replaced with Endemol Shine Group's wordmark-only logo in the closing credits of most of the shows that it licensed. Endemol created and ran reality, talent and game show franchises worldwide, including Big Brother, Deal or No Deal, Fear Factor, Wipeout, The Money Drop, and Your Face Sounds Familiar. The company also has a portfolio of drama and comedy series including titles such as The Fall, Peaky Blinders, Hell on Wheels, Benidorm, Ripper Street, Black Mirror, Bad Education, My Mad Fat Diary, Hot in Cleveland, Kirstie, Leverage, Home and Away, Death Comes to Pemberley and The Crimson Field.

== History ==
Endemol was founded in 1994 by a merger of television production companies owned by Joop van den Ende and John de Mol, the name deriving from the combination of their surnames.

On 23 June 1998, Endemol Entertainment had announced that they've entered the British market by acquiring a 50% majority stake in London-based production company Broadcast Communications from the Guardian Media Group.

Endemol has specialised in formatted programming that can be adapted for different countries around the world as well as different media platforms. One notable success has been the Big Brother reality television show, with versions in many countries after the initial Dutch version. Other examples include Deal or No Deal (sold to over 75 countries), The Money Drop (sold in over 50 countries), Fear Factor (sold in 30 countries) and Wipeout (sold in over 30 countries). From 2011 till its absorption by Endemol Shine Group, the company expanded its English language drama output with shows such as The Fall, Peaky Blinders, Ripper Street and Black Mirror in the UK and Hell on Wheels in the US. In November 2013 the company launched Endemol Beyond, an international division specialising in original content for digital video platforms such as YouTube.

In 2000, Endemol was sold to the Spanish multinational telecommunications company Telefónica for €5.5 billion. In November 2005, 25% of Endemol was taken public, and since was listed on the Euronext Amsterdam exchange under the stock symbol EML.

In late-July 2000, Endemol Entertainment announced that they've sold their international distribution arm alongside its film library to Canadian media conglomerate Canwest and had merged Endemol's distribution arm into their entertainment production subsidiary Fireworks Entertainment, in order for Endemol Entertainment to focus on their television production activities.

In August 2001, Endemol Entertainment had established its second Latinamerican production division as they joined forces with Brazilian television network TV Globo to jointly establish Endemol Entertainment's new Brazilian production division entitled Endemol Globo, marking Endmeol's second Latinoamerican production operation & the new Brazilian production unit Endemol Globo would produce Brazilian adaptations of Endemol Entertainment's entertainment programming for the Brazilian television market & would jointly develop & produce formats and programming that would be licensed for other countries while Endemol had signed a three-year volume deal with Argentine network Telefe and Endemol Entertainment had plans to launch another Latinamerican production arm in Latin America while Endemol Entertainment had signed a six-year volume production deal with TV Globo to create entertainment programming for free and pay television in Brazil.

In October 2001, Endemol expanded its Latinamerican production services into Mexico by teaming with Mexican telecommunications & broadcasting company Televisa to jointly establish Endemol's Mexican production arm based in Mexico City that can produce Mexican adaptations of Endemol's programming entitled Endemol Mexico, with Pedro Torries had been named as general manager of Endemol's newly formed Mexican production arm Endemol Mexico.

On 30 September 2003, Endemol announced that they had acquired a 51% majority stake in New York-based American reality independent production company True Entertainment with the company continued to be operated and placed with Endemol's US division with the latter expanding their international operations.

On 8 December 2006, Endemol announced that they would reacquire their French division Endemol France from their former parent Telefonica. By 9 January 2007, the Dutch-based European entertainment company had made a deal with their former parent company Telefonica to buy back their French outfit which would become a division of the reunited Dutch-based entertainment giant.

On 14 May 2007 the remaining 75% of Endemol shares were bought by a consortium, Edam Acquisition, led by Mediaset, the company controlled by Silvio Berlusconi's family, and including the investment company Cyrte, in which the original co-founder John de Mol has shares. The consortium announced on 6 August 2007 that it now owned 99.54% of Endemol shares, after an offer to buy the remaining shares went through on 3 August 2007; it asked the Euronext bourse for a delisting of Endemol.

In December 2009, Endemol announced that their German division Endemol Germany had entered drama production by launching a joint-venture with Germany's Wiedemann & Berg Film being named Wiedemann & Berg Television with W&B Film founders Quirin Berg and Max Wiedemann overseeing the management and will focus on scripted television series.

It was reported in 2010 that the company was $3 billion in debt. Then in 2011, it was reported that the debt had grown to $4.1 billion.

On 9 August 2010, Endemol announced that they acquired a majority stake in Los Angeles-based American reality production company Authentic Entertainment expanding their operations in the USA.

A loan restructure was planned for 2011 when Endemol was expected to breach its debt covenants. On 30 June, the debt covenants were breached at the same time that CEO Ynon Kreiz left the company and Endemol's UK subsidiary failed to file its annual accounts. On 23 March 2012, Endemol's debt was converted into shares by US private-equity firm Apollo Global Management. On 3 April 2012, Mediaset sold its majority stake in Endemol to Apollo and Dutch asset manager Cyrte, and Endemol restructured the bulk of its debt. The current CEO is Just Spee. On 15 May 2014, Apollo and 21st Century Fox announced a joint venture to combine 21st Century Fox's Shine Group and Apollo's Endemol and CORE Media Group. The deal closed October 2014.

Over the years Endemol has expanded its international presence either by starting up operations in new markets or by acquiring existing production companies. Most recently, in December 2013, Endemol became a shareholder in Israel's Channel 2 franchisee Reshet, following the acquisition in April of a controlling share in the Israeli independent producer Kuperman, which is now Endemol Israel.

On 17 December 2014, Endemol's parent company Apollo Global Management announced that they've completed their merger of Endemol with fellow Apollo subsidiary Core Media, producer of American Idol, and 21st Century Fox's British-based entertainment production and distribution company Shine unit, with the resulting 'mega-indie' adopting the name "Endemol Shine Group", which was a 50:50 joint venture by both parent companies. The name took effect on 1 January 2015. 21st Century Fox's predecessor company, Rupert Murdoch's News Corporation, had in 2011 bought Shine (founder and chairperson until the 2015 merger: Murdoch's daughter Elisabeth) for $673 million.

== Global presence ==
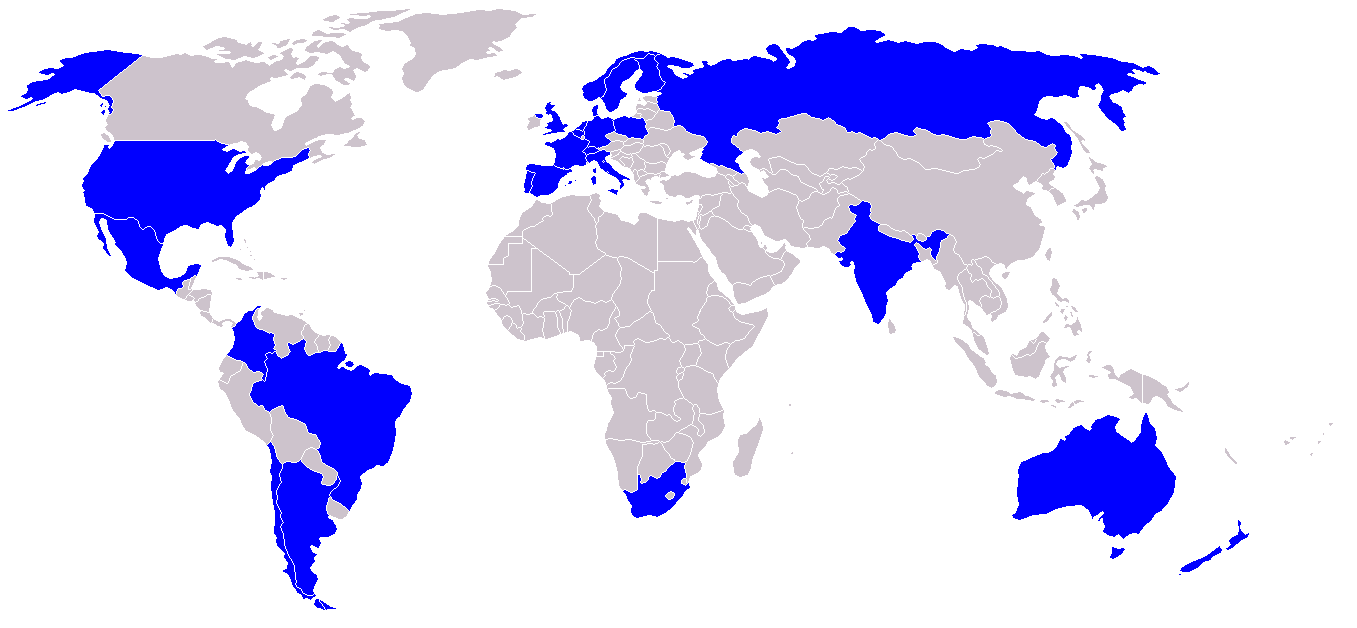
Map of World presence of Endemol

Endemol has the following operations around the world:

=== Endemol UK ===
Originally known as Broadcast Communications, Endemol UK is one of the UK's longest established production groups and won its first television commissions in the mid-1980s. It produces the main Endemol franchises such as Big Brother and Deal or No Deal.

=== Endemol India ===
In January 2006, Endemol started producing programs with Mohit Raina in different channels which are in Hindi, Telugu, Tamil, Marathi, Kannada, Malayalam and Bengali from Mumbai, India. For various media company's channels were Sony Pictures Networks India, Disney Star, Sun TV Network, Zee Entertainment Enterprises, Viacom 18, NDTV Imagine, Mazhavil Manorama

Year	TV Series	Language	TV Channel
2006–present	Bigg Boss Hindi	Hindi	Colors TV
2007–2008	Funjabbi Chak De	Hindi	Star One
2007–2008	Champion Chaalbaaz No.1	Hindi	Sony TV
2008	The Great Indian Laughter Challenge	Hindi	Star One
2008	Jo Jeeta Wohi Super Star	Hindi	StarPlus
2008–2010	Miley Jab Hum Tum	Hindi	Star One
2008–present	Khatron Ke Khiladi	Hindi	Colors TV
2008	Chhote Miyan	Hindi	Colors TV
2009	Ladies Special	Hindi	Zee TV
2009	Raju Hazir Ho	Hindi	Imagine TV
2009–2011	Sabki Laadli Bebo	Hindi	StarPlus
2010–2020	MasterChef India	Hindi	StarPlus
2010–2011	Geet - Hui Sabse Parayi	Hindi	Star One
2010–2011	Deala No Deala	Tamil	Sun TV
2010–2011	Deal or No Deal	Telugu	Gemini TV
2010–2012	Deal or No Deal	Malayalam	Surya TV
2010–2012	Deal or No Deal	Kannada	Udaya TV
2011–2012	Beend Banoongaa Ghodi Chadhunga	Hindi	Imagine TV
2011–2012	Dharampatni	Hindi	Imagine TV
2012	Jo Jeeta Wohi Super Star 2	Hindi	StarPlus
2013–present	Bigg Boss Kannada	Kannada	Colors Kannada
2014	Dancing Star	Kannada	Colors Kannada
2014	Super Minute	Kannada	Colors Kannada
2015	Code Red	Hindi	Colors TV
2015	Divided	Kannada	Zee Kannada
2015–16	Bigg Boss Bangla	Bengali	Colors Bangla
2015–16	Swim Team	Hindi	Channel V
2015–2019	The Voice India	Hindi	&TV
2016–2017	Minute to Win It	Malayalam	Mazhavil Manorama
2016-2017	Kuttikalodano Kali	Malayalam	Mazhavil Manorama
2017–2018	Still Standing	Malayalam	Mazhavil Manorama
2017–present	Bigg Boss Tamil	Tamil	Star Vijay
2017–present	Bigg Boss Telugu	Telugu	Star Maa
2018	Divided	Tamil	Star Vijay
2018–present	Bigg Boss Marathi	Marathi	Colors Marathi
2018–present	Bigg Boss Malayalam	Malayalam	Asianet
2018–2019	MTV Ace of Space	Hindi	MTV
2019–2021	Thaenmozhi B.A Uratchi Manra Thailavar	Tamil	Star Vijay
2019	The Wall	Tamil	Star Vijay
2020	Mujhse Shaadi Karoge	Hindi	Colors TV
2021–2023	Kaatrukkenna Veli	Tamil	Star Vijay
2021	MasterChef Tamil	Tamil	Sun TV
2021	MasterChef Telugu	Telugu	Gemini TV
2021	Bigg Boss OTT	Hindi	Voot
2021–2022	Daya	Malayalam	Asianet
2022	Bigg Boss Ultimate	Tamil	Disney+ Hotstar
2022	Bigg Boss Non-Stop	Telugu	Disney+ Hotstar
2022	Lock Upp	Hindi	ALTBalaji and MX Player
2022	Bigg Boss OTT Kannada	Kannada	Voot
2022–present	MasterChef India - Hindi	Hindi	Sony TV and SonyLIV
2022	BB Jodi – Season 1	Telugu	Star Maa
2023	Kumite 1 Warrior Hunt	Hindi	MX Player
2023–present	Neethone Dance	Telugu	Star Maa
2023–2024	Bigg Boss OTT	Hindi	JioCinema
2023	Star vs Food: Survival	Hindi	Discovery+
2023–present	MTV Hustle	Hindi	MTV India
2024	MasterChef India - Telugu	Telugu	SonyLIV
2024	MasterChef India - Tamil	Tamil	SonyLIV
2025-present	Bigg Boss Agnipariksha	Telugu	Star Maa; JioHotstar
2026	The 50	Hindi	Colors TV
2026-present	Bigg Boss Agnipareeksha	Malayalam	Asianet
2026-present	Bigg Boss – The Common Man	Tamil	Star Vijay
2026-present	Bigg Boss Agniparikshe	Kannada	Colors Kannada

=== Endemol Australia ===
Endemol Australia (formerly "Endemol Southern Star") is an Australian production company which was previously a joint venture of Endemol and Southern Star Group. Endemol purchased Southern Star Group from Fairfax Media in January 2009. It produces Endemol's popular worldwide formats for Australia, including Big Brother, Deal or No Deal, and Ready Steady Cook. It is based in Australia.

== Lawsuits ==
Endemol sued Brazilian channel SBT over what it says was a Big Brother copycat, and threatened to sue Russian Behind the Glass for the same reason.

Endemol was sued by four Georgia women alleging that a text-message game featured on Deal or No Deal is a form of illegal gambling.

== Productions ==
=== Reality television ===
- Auction Kings (produced by Endemol subsidiary Authentic Entertainment)
- Big Brother
- Secret Story (Version of Big Brother, exclusively for TF1, France, TVI, Portugal, and NET 5, Netherlands)
- Changing Rooms
- Dating in the Dark
- I Love Money
- Fear Factor (2001–2006; 2011–2012)
- The Big Donor Show
- Star Academy / Fame Academy
- Extreme Makeover: Home Edition
- The Bus
- The Games
- The Farm
- Jerseylicious
- Masterplan - O Grande Mestre
- Nice People
- Only Fools on Horses
- There's Something About Miriam
- Gay, Straight or Taken?
- Kid Nation
- Queen Bees
- Estate of Panic
- Southern Belles: Louisville
- Survivor South Africa
- T.I. & Tiny: The Family Hustle
- Love in the Wild
- Utopia (2014), a reality TV program featuring 15 people given the aim of building up a new community living on a rural property
- The Voice

=== Factual ===
- Restoration - Aired 2003, 2004, 2006
- Restoration Home - (2011–2013)

=== Late night/variety shows ===
- Crónicas Marcianas
- Games Uplate Live (2006–2009; ABS-CBN)

=== Drama ===
- Black Mirror (drama/satire)
- The Fall (Crime drama)
- Peaky Blinders (Crime drama)
- Hell on Wheels (Western)
- Benidorm (Comedy)
- Ripper Street (Crime drama)
- Bad Education (Comedy)
- My Mad Fat Diary (Comedy)
- Isidingo (Soapie)
- Graduados (romantic comedy)
- Jonathan Strange & Mr Norrell
- Los exitosos Pells (Comedy)
- Red Widow (crime drama/mystery)

=== Game shows ===
- 1 vs. 100
- 101 Ways to Leave a Gameshow
- The Winner Is
- 20Q
- Beat the Nation
- BrainTeaser
- Break the Bank
- Deal or No Deal
- Divided
- Eliminator
- Fear Factor
- For the Rest of Your Life
- Golden Balls
- Hotrods
- In the Grid
- Judas Game
- Midnight Money Madness
- The Million Pound Drop (quiz show)
- Participation TV
- Pointless
- Set for Life
- Show Me the Money
- Take the Cake
- The Almost Impossible Gameshow
- The Bank Job
- The Brain
- The Wall
- Wipeout / Total Wipeout
- XXS – Extra Extra Small
- Wheel of Fortune

=== Children's shows ===
- The DJ Kat Show
- Gordon the Garden Gnome
- Bananas in Pyjamas
- Nini
- Pig's Breakfast
- Hi-5
- How 2
- The Adventures of Bottle Top Bill and His Best Friend Corky
- Animal Express
- Cushion Kids
- Classic Tales
- Aliens Among Us
- The Shak
- The Tribe
- Dinky Dog
- R.L. Stine's The Haunting Hour
- Total Drama
- Ani Tore! EX
- I Can Cook
- Geef Nooit Op

=== Live TV ===
- Domino Day

=== Sitcoms ===
- Hot in Cleveland (International distribution only)
- Happily Divorced (International distribution only)
- The Exes

=== Talk/Variety ===
- The Steve Harvey Show
- Katch It With Khanyi
