= MasterChef India – Tamil season 2 =

MasterChef India – Tamil
- Season 2
- Judges: Koushik Shankar; Rakesh Raghunathan; Shreeya Adka
- No. of contestants: 12
- Winner: Akash Muralidharan
- Runners-up: Zarina Banu; Vani Sundar
- No. of episodes: 35

Release
- Original network: SonyLIV
- Original release: 22 April – 7 June 2024

Series chronology
- ← Previous; Season 1 Next → Season 3

Season 2 of the Indian Tamil-language competitive cooking reality TV show MasterChef India – Tamil. was released on SonyLIV on 22 April 2024. The shows premiered on the television channel Kalaignar TV starting from 17 November 2024 on every Sunday at 12pm.

Koushik Shankar returned from Season 1, alongside new judges Rakesh Raghunathan and Shreeya Adka. The Masterchef Tamil season 2 was announced on MasterChef India – Hindi episode on 20 November 2023. The audition rounds were conducted in 2 cities across the statewide auditions - Coimbatore (2 November 2023), Chennai (4 November). Akash Muralidharan from Chennai won the season alongside the MasterChef trophy and 10 Lakh's prize money.

== Top 6 ==
No	Contestant	Status	Ref
1	Akash Muralidharan	Winner; June 07, 2024; Episode 35	
2	Zarina Banu	Runner-up; June 07, 2024; Episode 35	
2	Vani Sundar	Runner-up; June 07, 2024; Episode 35	
4	Pavithra Nalin	Finalist; June 07, 2024; Episode 35	
5	Preethi Raghunandan	Top 5 June 04, 2024; Episode 32	
6	Praveen Kumar	Top 6 June 03, 2024; Episode 31	

== Top 12 Contestants ==
No	Contestant	Status
1	Akash Muralidharan	Winner; June 07, 2024; Episode 35
2	Zarina Banu	Runner-up; June 07, 2024; Episode 35
2	Vani Sundar	Runner-up; June 07, 2024; Episode 35
4	Pavithra Nalin	Finalist/Eliminated; June 07, 2024; Episode 35
5	Preethi Raghunandan	Top 5/Eliminated; June 04, 2024; Episode 32
6	Praveen Kumar	Top 6/Eliminated; June 03, 2024; Episode 31
7	Arthi Rathore	Eliminated; May 31, 2024; Episode 30
8	Sudheer Padinchara	Eliminated; May 31, 2024; Episode 30
9	Sangeetha Swaminathan	Eliminated; May 24, 2024; Episode 25
10	Kavitha A	Eliminated; May 24, 2024; Episode 25
11	Jeevika Sri	Eliminated; May 17, 2024; Episode 20
12	Nanda Kumar	Eliminated; May 03, 2024; Episode 10

== Production ==
=== Development ===
The first season was produced by Endemol Shine India, and was aired on Sun TV in 2021. In end of 2023, after the completion of the first season (2021), the show was under the production of SonyLIV buying its broadcasting rights of Tamil and Telugu versions.

=== Release ===
The three judges were introduced on MasterChef India – Hindi season 8 episode on 20 November 2023. The first promo was unveiled on 30 October 2023, featuring Koushik Shankar, Rakesh Raghunathan and Shreeya Adka.
