= Sanjay Thumma =

Indian chef

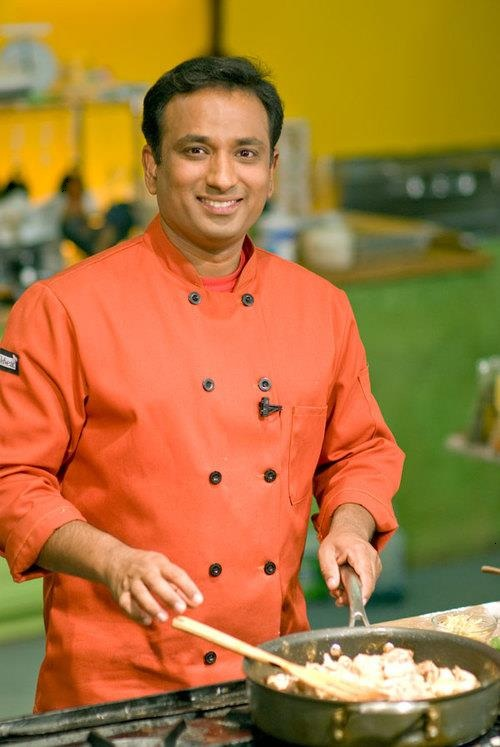
- Thumma in 2013
- Born: 26 April 1970 (age 56); Hyderabad, Telangana, India
- Other names: Washy, Washer, Thummer, Thumsy, Sanner
- Education: Diploma in Hotel Management, IHM, Hyderabad
- Occupations: Chef, Television Host, and Entrepreneur
- Website: http://www.vahrehvah.com

Sanjay Thumma (born 26 April 1970) popularly known as Vah-Chef, is an Indian celebrity chef, entrepreneur, restaurateur and television personality. He is the founder of the cooking website, vahrehvah.com. He is especially popular among the Indian-expatriate communities across the world, especially for his unique comedic style. He became known for his online recipe channel on YouTube, which he started in 2007, with over 750 million views. He is one of the three judges in the first season of MasterChef India – Telugu.

== Early life ==
Sanjay Thumma was born in Hyderabad. His interest in the kitchen began when he was just 7 years old. His mother would engage him in the kitchen so that he would not annoy his siblings. His first dishes were dosa and scrambled eggs. His desire to cook increased when his mother was bedridden with a temporary illness and he had to cook for himself. He eventually went on to get his diploma in Hotel Management from the Institute of Hotel Management in Hyderabad. He is married to Ragini, who is also a chef, with whom he has a son.

== Career ==
Thumma opened his first restaurant, Sizzle India, in Chicago in 1998. Over the next seven years, he opened three more. He eventually sold his restaurants as he felt that as a chef he hardly got a chance to cook.

In September 2007, he set up a studio in Chicago and started recording his first 150 recipes, which he posted on YouTube on his channel VahChef, soon becoming a sensation, and each video reaching over a million views. His channel went on to become viral and gained a large following among Indian communities all over the world. His channel crossed 750 million views with 2.3 million subscribers and more than 2,000 videos. He adds 10 to 12 new videos each month, with thousands of views within hours.

He moved back to India in 2008 with his family and launched his own website, vahrehvah.com. In 2014, his channel had 1.45 million subscribers. As of June 2021, his YouTube channel has 2.39 million subscribers.

== Filmography ==
=== Television ===
Year	Title	Role	Network	Notes
2014–2019	Vah Re Vah	Host/Cook	Zee Telugu	
2016–present	Super Chef	Host/Cook	ETV Abhiruchi	
2020	Garam Garam Vantalu	Guest cook	Sakshi TV	Special episode
2021–2024	MasterChef India	Judge	Gemini TV; SonyLIV	
2024	Thulasivanam	Telugu Chef	ETV Win	
2024	Bigg Boss 8	Guest cook	Star Maa	

== Awards ==
- 2018 – OSM Foodie/Chef of the Year at Outlook Social Media Awards
