= Geef Nooit Op =

Dutch television program

- Genre: Children's television series
- Starring: Peter Jan Rens
- Country of origin: Netherlands
- Original language: Dutch
- No. of seasons: 6

Production
- Producers: Chantal Widdershoven (1991-1993); Corine Schaling (1993-1997)
- Running time: 47,5 Minutes
- Production companies: John De Mol Productions (1991-1993); RTL Nederland (1993-1997)

Original release
- Network: VARA (1991-1993); RTL 4 (1993-1997)
- Release: 1991 – 1997

Geef Nooit Op (Dutch: never give up) is a Dutch television series broadcast by VARA and RTL 4 between November 1991 and February 1997 and presented by Peter Jan Rens. The concept was based on the BBC series Jim'll Fix It. The show encouraged children to write in a letter to Rens with a "wish" that would come true at the end of each episode.

== Transmission guide ==
Series	No. of episodes	Channel	Aired
1	7	Nederland 2	19 November 1991 – 31 December 1991
2	11	Nederland 3	26 November 1992 – 4 February 1993
3	10	RTL 4	15 October 1993 – 17 December 1993
4	6	RTL 4	29 October 1994 – 3 December 1994
5	6	RTL 4	6 January 1996 – 10 February 1996
6	7	RTL 4	4 January 1997 – 22 February 1997

=== Compilations ===
Series	Channel	Aired
Series 2 compilation	Nederland 3	15 April 1993
