= Devaki Vijayaraman =

Winner of MasterChef India - Tamil 2021

- Born: c.1992 Trichy, Tamil Nadu
- Other names: Devaki Vijayakumar
- Education: B. Com
- Alma mater: Ethiraj College for Women
- Occupation: Television Cook
- Known for: Winning MasterChef India – Tamil (season 1)
- Style: Indian
- Television: MasterChef India – Tamil (season 1)
- Successor: Akash Muralidharan
- Spouse: Gokulnath Vijayakumar
- Children: 1
- Awards: Trophy of MasterChef India – Tamil (season 1)

Devaki Vijayaraman (born c.1992) is an Indian baker, television cook and a business owner, who hails from the town Trichy. She was the winner of MasterChef India – Tamil (season 1).

Vijayaraman plans to use her prize on 25 lakh to extend her training. She plans include having a restaurant featuring South Indian style dishes and desserts.

== Early life ==
Devaki was born in Trichy, Tamil Nadu in 1992. During her secondary school life Devaki always wanted to become a chef and study catering technology and open up her small bakery. But unfortunately her parents did not agree to that and she started her studies in B.Com and graduated from that field from Cauvery College for Women which is located in Chennai.

She later quit her B.Com job and started up a small baking business which became successful and Devaki found a her major interest in cooking and baking then.

She later married a man from Madurai named Gokulnath Vijayakumar and later the couple had a son together.

== MasterChef India - Tamil ==
Devaki was selected in the Top 14 to contest MasterChef India - Tamil in 2021. She reached the finale on 14 November, which she won 54 points out of 60. Which was the highest points ever received on the show up to date.

She is also the first person to win MasterChef India - Tamil.

== After MasterChef ==
Vijayaraman is currently planning to start her own YouTube channel to provide information and recipes of various different dishes she made. She has also committed for a movie. She opened up a small baking business under the name of Brown Sugar By Devaki Vijayaraman which is located in the heart of Puthur, Tiruchirappalli.

Preceded by Show Created	MasterChef India – Tamil Winner (Series 1) 2021	Succeeded by Akash Muralidharan
