= Rathnam (film) =

2024 film by Hari

- Theatrical release poster
- Directed by: Hari
- Written by: Hari
- Produced by: Kaarthekeyan Santhanam; Alankar Pandian
- Starring: Vishal; Priya Bhavani Shankar
- Cinematography: M. Sukumar
- Edited by: T. S. Jay
- Music by: Devi Sri Prasad
- Production companies: Stone Bench Films; Zee Studios; Invenio Origin
- Distributed by: Ayngaran International; Big Films
- Release date: 26 April 2024
- Running time: 156 minutes
- Country: India
- Language: Tamil

Rathnam (transl. Gem) is a 2024 Indian Tamil-language action thriller film written and directed by Hari and jointly produced by Stone Bench Films, Zee Studios and Invenio Origin. The film stars Vishal in the titular role, alongside Priya Bhavani Shankar in a dual role as the female lead and the hero's mother in a cameo, Samuthirakani, Gautham Vasudev Menon, Yogi Babu, Murali Sharma, Hareesh Peradi and Vijayakumar. It marks the third collaboration of Vishal and Hari after Thaamirabharani and Poojai.

The film was officially announced in April 2023 under the tentative title Vishal 34, as it is Vishal's 34th film as the lead actor, and the official title was announced in December 2023. Principal photography commenced in July 2023. It was shot sporadically in several legs, with filming locations including Thoothukudi, Trichy, Karaikudi, Vellore, Tirupati, Chennai, and wrapped by late-January 2024. The music was composed by Devi Sri Prasad, while cinematography and editing were handled by M. Sukumar and T. S. Jay.

Rathnam was released on 26 April 2024 and received negative reviews from critics, who criticised its violence, pacing, loudness and dated writing, though some praised Vishal's performance and Devi Sri Prasad's music. The film had an average run at the box office.

== Plot ==
Past: Three men cause a deadly bus accident, killing all the passengers and looting their money and jewellery. They also push a police van off a cliff. A woman survives, escapes by bus and works in a village to raise her son. When a pimp tries to kill a man, the boy kills her, and the man takes the boy under his protection.

Present: Rathnam is a henchman who works for MLA Panneer Selvam in Vellore. Panneer tells him that a rogue ward councillor tried to sexually assault a girl, who was injured while escaping. Rathnam beats up the councillor's men and hacks the councillor to death with a chainsaw. With Panneer's help, Rathnam later protects Malliga, a medical student who resembles his late mother Loganayagi, from land grabber Beema Rayudu and his brothers Subba Rayudu and Raghava Rayudu, who attacked her after her family refused to sell them their land.

On Rathnam's advice, Malliga sells the land to build a medical college. Rathnam kills Subba Rayudu and warns Beema Rayudu that he and Raghava Rayudu are next. When Panneer confronts him, Rathnam reveals that he has found his real family and learnt that the three brothers are Loganayagi's brothers Dharmalingam, Punniyakodi and Keshavan.

Past: The three brothers are the robbers from the bus attack. Loganayagi discovers their crimes and tries to stop them. Rathnam's father, a police officer investigating the case, is killed by the trio, but Loganayagi escapes. She gives birth to Rathnam and later dies by suicide after a pimp brands her a prostitute. This is the pimp whom Rathnam killed as a boy.

Present: Rathnam introduces Malliga to his family. Beema Rayudu attacks the family and kills several of its members. Rathnam tracks down and kills Raghava Rayudu, then beheads Beema Rayudu and surrenders to the police. Before going to prison, he asks Malliga to marry and to name her child after him. Malliga breaks down and embraces him.

== Cast ==
- Vishal as Rathnam
  - Pragadeesh RM as Young Rathnam
- Priya Bhavani Shankar in a dual role as
  - Malliga, Rathnam's love interest
  - Loganayagi, Rathnam's late mother (cameo appearance)
- Samuthirakani as MLA Panneer Selvam
- Yogi Babu as Moorthy
- Murali Sharma as Beema Rayudu (Dharmalingam)
- Hareesh Peradi as Subba Rayudu (Punniyakodi)
- Vettai Muthukumar as Raghava Rayudu (Keshavan)
- Vijayakumar as Malliga's grandfather
- Jayaprakash as Vedha Nayagam, Malliga's father
- Tulasi as Malliga's mother
- Delhi Ganesh as Neelakandan, Home Minister of Tamil Nadu
- Rajendran as Mahesh
- Y. Gee. Mahendra as Rathnam's grandfather
- Mohan Raman as Rathnam's uncle
- C. Ranganathan as Rathnam's uncle
- Gajaraj as Gajendra Babu, Education Minister
- Pondy Ravi as Babu Reddy, Councillor
- Jeeva Ravi as Malliga's uncle
- Supergood Subramani as Surveyor
- Arvind Khathare as Vellore DC
- Ashok Pandian as SP Seenivasan IPS
- Sujatha Babu as Panneer Selvam's wife
- Sumathi G. as tenant who doesn't pay rent
- Gautham Vasudev Menon as Anbazhagan, Principal Secretary (cameo appearance)
- Ganesh Venkatraman as Rathnam's late father (cameo appearance)
- VTV Ganesh as Inspector Muthupandi (cameo appearance)

== Production ==
=== Development ===
On 23 April 2023, Vishal Film Factory announced that its founder, Vishal, was to join hands with director Hari for an upcoming project, tentatively titled Vishal 34. The project marks Vishal's third film with Hari after Thaamirabharani (2007) and Poojai (2014). The shooting was reported to commence after Vishal finishes his commitments to Mark Antony (2023). A muhurat puja was held on 23 April. In mid June, Priya Bhavani Shankar was reported to play the lead female role, her second film with Hari after Yaanai (2022). Her casting was confirmed in July. Reportedly, the team was in talks with Sai Pallavi and Aishwarya Lekshmi to play the lead female role before finalising Priya. In early July, Devi Sri Prasad was chosen to compose the soundtrack and background score for the film.

=== Filming ===
Principal photography commenced on 16 July 2023, with the first schedule in Chennai. In August, the location was changed to Thoothukudi. The schedule reportedly featured an action sequence. On 29 August, Vishal, via X (formerly Twitter), revealed that the schedule had concluded. The second schedule commenced in early October in a village in Tuticorin called Kimarasakkanapuram. Vishal had helped the villagers there to get a drinking water facility during the schedule. Principal photography wrapped by 23 January 2024.

== Music ==
The music and background score is composed by Devi Sri Prasad, in his sixth collaboration with Hari after Aaru (2005), Singam (2010), Venghai (2011), Singam II (2013) and Saamy Square (2018); maiden with Vishal. The first look song "Vaarai Rathnam" was released on 1 January 2024. The first single "Don't Worry Da Machi" was released on 9 March 2024. The second single “Ethanaala” was released on 29 March 2024. The third single "Uyire En Uyire" was released on 19 April 2024. The last single "Yeduvaraiyo" was released on 24 April 2024. The entire soundtrack album was released on 26 April 2024 after the film's release.

Later, the production house announced that the audio rights for the film were acquired by Aditya Music.

All lyrics are written by Viveka.

Track listing
No.	Title	Singer(s)	Length
1.	"Vaarai Rathnam"	Shenbagaraj	2:48
2.	"Don't Worry Da Machi"	Devi Sri Prasad	3:34
3.	"Ethanaala" (Version I)	Sinduri Vishal	4:30
4.	"Uyire En Uyire"	Kapil Kapilan, Ranina Reddy	3:04
5.	"Yeduvaraiyo"	Hariharan	4:19
6.	"Endha Uyiraiyum"	Vaikom Vijayalakshmi	3:06
7.	"Ethanaala" (Version II)	S. P. Charan	4:31
8.	"Sengamalam"	Deepthi Suresh, Abinaya Shenbagaraj, Sushmita Narasimhan, Padmaja Sreenivasan	0:51
9.	"Porale"	S. P. Abhishek	0:45

== Release ==
=== Theatrical ===
Rathnam was released on 26 April 2024.

=== Home media ===
The satellite and digital rights of the film were acquired by Amazon Prime Video and Zee Tamil. The film had its digital premiere on the streaming platform from 23 May 2024.

== Reception ==
=== Critical response ===
On the review aggregator website Rotten Tomatoes, 20% of 5 critics' reviews are positive, with an average rating of 6/10.

Abhinav Subramanian of The Times of India gave 3/5 stars and wrote "It's your typical Hari formula – action-packed, fast-paced, and unrelenting – but even by his standards, it feels sluggish at times." Manigandan KR of Times Now gave 3/5 stars and wrote "Rathnam is not a perfect commercial action entertainer. It has its share of faults and limitations but it is truly what we described it as – an entertainer." K. Janani of India Today gave 2/5 stars and wrote "'Rathnam' is a clichéd mass masala entertainer that is neither massy nor has masala."

Akchayaa Rajkumar of The News Minute gave 2/5 stars and wrote "Neither stellar performances from Priya Bhavani Shankar and Samuthirakani nor the plot twists towards the end would save the audience from the headache and potential ear damage that Rathnam might cause." Kirubhakar Purushothaman of The Indian Express gave 1.5/5 stars and wrote "Vishal and Hari come together for an action-drama again, which is as dated as their old collaborations." Anusha Sundar of OTTplay gave 1.5/5 stars and wrote "Even as Vishal stands tall and brings some action blocks to life, the caricature made out of his and other characters makes Rathnam a childish film. It is obsolete and loaded with unintentional quips."

Latha Srinivasan of Hindustan Times wrote "With old tropes and old action, Vishal and Hari are unable to capture the audience's attention with this one. Rathnam is a template masala Hari film and just old wine in an old bottle." Bhuvanesh Chander of The Hindu wrote "In his latest outing with Vishal, Hari attempts to adapt some of his tropes to the sensibilities of the modern-day audience, but the ideas he plays around with and the story he wishes to tell still belong in the 2000s." Ram Venkat Srikar of Film Companion wrote "With all the thoughts it wanted to blend, Rathnam could have been a lot more than what it ended up being."
