= Thulasivanam =

Indian Telugu-language webseries

- Genre: Drama; Comedy
- Written by: Anil Reddy
- Directed by: Anil Reddy
- Starring: Akshay Lagusani: Aishwarya Holakkal; Venkatesh Kakumanu
- Music by: Smaran
- Country of origin: India
- Original language: Telugu
- No. of seasons: 1
- No. of episodes: 6

Production
- Executive producers: Shanmukh Rao: Venkatesh Kakumanu; Chaitanya Garikapati
- Producers: Swagath Reddy: Nilith Paidipally; Preetham Devireddy; Anil Reddy; Sai Jagarlamudi; Saikrishna Gadwal; Jeevan Kumar; Pavan Kandi
- Cinematography: Prem Sagar
- Editor: Raviteja Girijala

Original release
- Network: ETV Win
- Release: 21 March – 4 April 2024

Thulasivanam is a 2024 Indian Telugu-language comedy drama streaming television series written and directed by Anil Reddy. The series featured Akshay Lagusani, Aishwarya Holakka and Venkatesh Kakumanu in lead roles. It was premiered on 21 March 2024 on ETV Win.

== Cast ==
- Akshay Lagusani as Thulasi
  - Bhanu as Young Thulasi
- Aishwarya Holakkal as Deepika "Deepu"
- Venkatesh Kakumanu as Giribabu
- Vishnu Oi as Prem
- Siddharth Gollapudi as Kaushal "PM Sir"
- Prem Sagar as Prasad Garu, Thulasi's father
- Gaythri Chaganti as Chitra
- Sunitha Anand as Ankitha
- Madhu Mani as Thulasi's mother
- Vasanth Sagar as Dev Patel
- Pavan Sadineni in an extended cameo appearance as film director
- Abhinav Gomatam in an extended cameo appearance
- Sanjay Thumma in a cameo appearance as chef

== Episodes ==
No.	Title	Directed by	Written by	Original release date
1	"Virat Thulasi"	Anil Reddy	Anil reddy	21 March 2024
2	"The Party Animal"	Anil Reddy	Anil reddy	21 March 2024
3	"Deepika"	Anil Reddy	Anil reddy	21 March 2024
4	"Love and Practice"	Anil Reddy	Anil reddy	4 April 2024
5	"Nuv Pressure Thattukolev"	Anil Reddy	Anil reddy	4 April 2024
6	"The Final Game"	Anil Reddy	Anil reddy	4 April 2024

== Reception ==
A critic gave a mixed review, and appreciated the performances of cast while saying that, "Thulasivanam disappoints as it falls into the trap of predictability and staleness, failing to offer anything fresh or engaging".
