= The Terrorist (2018 film) =

2018 Indian Kannada-language suspense-thriller drama film

- Theatrical release poster
- Directed by: PC Shekhar
- Written by: Sachin SG Holagund (dialogues)
- Produced by: Alankar Pandian
- Starring: Ragini Dwivedi
- Music by: Pradeep Varma
- Production company: Invenio Origin
- Release date: 18 October 2018
- Country: India
- Language: Kannada

The Terrorist is a 2018 Indian Kannada-language suspense-thriller drama film directed by PC Shekhar and starring Ragini Dwivedi.

== Cast ==
- Ragini Dwivedi as Reshma
- Manu Hegde
- Amir Ali Shaik
- Krishna Hebbale
- Samiksha
- Ravi Bhat
- Pushkar Mallikarjunaiah

== Music ==
The music for the film was composed by Pradeep Varma.

Track listing
No.	Title	Lyrics	Singer(s)	Length
1.	"Suriyoo Kaneera Omme"	Mahesh Raj	Ananya Bhat	2:23
2.	"Jeeva Neevene"	Mahesh Raj	Ananya Bhat, Chethan Naik	2:48
Total length:				5:11

== Reception ==
A critic from The Times of India wrote that "Take time off to watch The Terrorist this weekend for its gripping, but no-nonsense tale". A critic from The News Minute wrote that "Just being different from the usual stereotypes does not qualify as content. A film should be really well scripted and executed to make a difference". A critic from The New Indian Express wrote that "The Terrorist adds a human and innocent angle to a highly debated topic and makes it a one time watch".
