= MasterChef India – Tamil season 1 =

Season of television series

MasterChef India – Tamil
- Season 1
- Presented by: Vijay Sethupathi (Episode 1–10, 12–29); Shali Nivekas (Episode 11)
- Judges: Harish Rao; Aarthi Sampath; Koushik S
- No. of contestants: 14
- Winner: Devaki Vijayaraman
- Runner-up: Nithya Franklyn
- No. of episodes: 29

Release
- Original network: Sun TV
- Original release: 7 August – 14 November 2021

Series chronology
- Next → Season 2

Season 1 of the Indian Tamil-language competitive cooking reality TV series MasterChef India – Tamil which premiered on 7 August 2021 on Sun TV. The show is hosted by actor and producer Vijay Sethupathi, while professional chefs Harish Rao, Aarthi Sampath and Koushik S serve as judges for this season. Shali Nivekas was the guest host for episode 11 instead of Vijay Sethupathi due to the celebration episode of Vinayaka Chaturti.

Devaki Vijayaraman, an Homebaker from Trichy, Tamil Nadu was declared as the winner on 14 November 2021, with Nithya Franklyn of Thoothukudi, Tamil Nadu being the runner-up.

== Format ==
Top 24 home cooks were chosen from the auditions from the state of Tamil Nadu. From them, only 14 advanced home cooks were selected to participate in the main competition.

== Top 14 ==
Source for all first names.

No	Contestant	Status
1	Devaki Vijayaraman	Winner; 14 November
2	Nithya Franklyn	Runner-up; 14 November
3	Krithika Sivanesan	Eliminated; 14 November
3	Vinny Shukla	Eliminated; 14 November
5	Manikandan K	Eliminated; 7 November
6	Sumitra Rajesh	Eliminated; 17 October
7	Sunitha Selva	Eliminated; 10 October
8	Nausheen Yusuf	Eliminated; 3 October
9	Kruthaj Ashok Kumar	Eliminated; 26 September
10	Aarthi Satheesh	Eliminated; 19 September
11	Mariam Shazia Shah	Eliminated; 12 September
11	Tara Rhine	Re-eliminated; 12 September; Returned; 4 September; Eliminated; 22 August
13	Sasi Gnanadurai	Eliminated; 29 August; Re-eliminated; 4 September
14	Shashi Anand Sridharan	Eliminated; 15 August; Re-eliminated; 4 September

== Elimination Table ==
No	Contestant	Episode																															
No	Contestant	3	4		5	6		7	8		9	10	SE	11	12		13	14	15	16		17	18	19	20	21	22	23	24	25	26	27	28/29
1	Devaki	WON	SAFE		WON	SAFE		IN	RIGH	SAFE	SAFE	LOST	SE	WON	SAFE		BTM	PT	IN	IN	SAFE	WON	SAFE	WON	SAFE	BTM	PT	NEXT	LOSE	WIN	SAFE		WINNER
2	Nithya	IN	SAFE		IN	WON	SAFE	IN	RIGH	SAFE	SAFE	LOST	SE	LOSE	RIGH	SAFE	WON	SAFE	WON	SAFE		BTM	PT	BTM	PT	WON	SAFE	OUT	NO	WIN	SAFE		RUNNER-UP
3	Krithika	IN	SAFE		IN	LOSE	PT	WON	SAFE		SAFE	LOST	SE	LOSE	RIGH	SAFE	WON	SAFE	IN	IN	SAFE	BTM	PT	WON	SAFE	BTM	PT	NEXT	WIN	SAFE			ELIM
3	Vinny	IN	SAFE		TOP	IN	SAFE	WON	SAFE		SAFE	LOST	SE	WON	SAFE		BTM	PT	IN	BTM	PT	BTM	PT	WON	SAFE	WON	SAFE	NEXT	LOSE	NEXT	WIN	SAFE	ELIM
5	Manikandan	IN	SAFE		WON	SAFE		WON	SAFE		SAFE	LOST	SE	WON	SAFE		BTM	PT	WON	SAFE		BTM	PT	WON	SAFE	BTM	PT	OUT	NO	NEXT	ELIM		
6	Sumitra	IN	BTM	PT	TOP	WON	SAFE	IN	WRON	PT	SAFE	LOST	SE	WON	SAFE		WON	SAFE	WON	SAFE		WON	SAFE	BTM	PT	BTM	ELIM						
7	Sunitha	WON	SAFE		WON	SAFE		IN	WRON	PT	SAFE	LOST	SE	LOSE	RIGH	SAFE	BTM	PT	IN	BTM	PT	BTM	PT	BTM	ELIM								
8	Nausheen	TOP	SAFE		IN	IN	SAFE	WON	SAFE		SAFE	IMN	SE	LOSE	IMN	SAFE	BTM	PT	IN	IN	SAFE	BTM	ELIM										
9	Kruthaj	IN	SAFE		IN	LOSE	PT	IN	RIGH	SAFE	SAFE	LOST	SE	WON	SAFE		WON	SAFE	IN	BTM	ELIM												
10	Aarthi	IN	SAFE		WON	SAFE		WIN	SAFE		SAFE	LOST	SE	WON	SAFE		BTM	ELIM															
11	Mariam	IN	BTM	PT	IN	WON	SAFE	WON	SAFE		SAFE	LOST	SE	LOSE	WRON	ELIM																	
11	Tara	IN	SAFE		IN	LOSE	ELIM				RET	LOST	SE	LOSE	WRON	ELIM																	
13	Sasi	TOP	SAFE		IN	IN	SAFE	IN	WRON	ELIM	ELIM																						
14	Shashi	WEAK	BTM	ELIM							ELIM																						

(WIN) The cook won the Mystery Box challenge, or any other individual / pair challenge.
(TOP) The cook was one of the top entries in an individual challenge but didn't win.
(WEAK) The cook was one of the bottom entries in an individual challenge.
(BTM) The cook was one of the bottom entries in an individual challenge and had to compete in the upcoming elimination challenge.
(IN) The cook wasn't selected as a top or bottom entry in an individual / pair challenge.
(WIN) The cook was on the winning team in a team challenge and directly advanced to the next round.
(SAFE) The cook didn't participate in the challenge as he/she already advanced to the next round.
(LOSE) The cook was on the losing team in the team challenge and had to compete in the upcoming elimination challenge.
(IN) The cook wasn't selected as a top or bottom entry in a team challenge.
(RIGH) The cook has selected the right answer in an ingredient guessing challenge and saved from elimination test.
(WRON) The cook has selected the wrong answer in an ingredient guessing challenge and had to participate in the elimination test.
(IMN) The cook won an Immunity Pin in a given challenge.
(LOST) The cook lost an Immunity Pin in a given challenge.
(RET) The cook won the Wild Card Challenge and returned to the competition.
(PT) The cook competed in an elimination test, and advanced.
(SE) All the cooks are not being judged for their dish that specific episode since it's a special celebration episode.
(ELIM) The cook was eliminated from MasterChef.
(PELM) The cook eliminated from MasterChef Apron Challenge 1 and 2
(OUT) The cook lost the first level of the ticket to finale challenge.
(NEXT) The cook won the 1st round and advanced to the 2nd and final round of the ticket to finale challenge.
(NO) The cook didn't participate in the 2nd level of the ticket to finale challenge.
(LOSE) The cook lost the 2nd level of the ticket to finale challenge.
(WIN) The cook won the Ticket to Finale Challenge and was directly promoted as a finalist.
(WINNER) The cook is the winner of the season.
(RUNNER-UP) The cook is the runner up of the season.

== Guest appearances ==
- Nikki Galrani
- Remya Nambeesan
- Gayathrie

== Episodes ==
No.	Title	Original release date
1	"Episode 1, Season 1"	7 August 2021
Vijay Sethupathi opens the show explaining the concept of the MasterChef show concept. Later the three judges of the season were introduced Harish Rao, Aarthi Sampath and Koushik S who are professional chefs and judges. Later the top 24 contestants where selected from the state of Tamil Nadu and had to compete to get a spot in the top 14 to enter the main competition.: Apron Challenge 1 Winner: Aarthi, Krithika, Nausheen and Nithya were qualified into Master Chef Competition.; Jayanthi, Jayashri, Mukhil, Sakthivel, Senguttuvan, & Vishwa were eliminated
2	"Episode 2, Season 1"	8 August 2021
After a small recap, the audition competition continued to select its top 14 out of the 24.: Apron Challenge 1 Winner: Devaki, Kruthaj, Mariam, Sasi, Shashi, Sumithra, Tara, Vinny were qualified into Master Chef Competition.; Apron Challenge 2: Apoorv, Ashwini, Manikandan, Revathi, Savetha and Sunitha had to cut the ingredients and to place it on the ingredient board. Sunitha won the challenge and Manikandan was the last contestant to qualify into Master Chef Competition.; Apoorv, Ashwini, Revathi, & Savetha were failed to qualify into Master Chef Competition.
3	"Episode 3, Season 1"	14 August 2021
Mystery Box Challenge: For the first time in MasterChef Tamil history the mystery box was unveiled. The judges gave a selected amount of ingredients for the contestants to turn them into a full coarse meal.; Challenge winner: Devaki Vijayaraman and Sunitha Selva
4	"Episode 4, Season 1"	15 August 2021
Elimination Challenge: The top three bottom performed cooks had to participate in the elimination pressure test. The dish the contestants had to cook was the signature dish of judge Koushik S. The cooks had to make the dessert Kozhukkatta which is the signature dish of Koushik S.; Bottom Three: Mariam Shajia Shah, Sumitra Rajesh and Shashi Anand Sridharan; Eliminated: Shashi Anand Sridharan
5	"Episode 5, Season 1"	21 August 2021
Mocktail Challenge: The cooks had to make their own creative Mocktails using Goli Soda which is a bitter drink.; Challenge winner: Aarthi Satheesh, Devaki Vijayaraman, Manikandan K and Sunitha Selva.
6	"Episode 6, Season 1"	22 August 2021
Team Equipment Challenge: 1. Team Blue: Mariam Shajia, Nithya Franklyn and Sumitra Rajesh (Won); 2. Team Yellow: Sasi Gnanadurai, Nausheen Yusuf and Vinny Shukla (Qualified); 3. Team Red: Krithika Sivanesan, Kruthaj Ashok Kumar and Tara Rhine (Lost); Elimination Challenge: After a team challenge, Krithika Sivanesan, Kruthaj Ashok Kumar and Tara Rhine (Team Red) received the lowest and had to compete in the elimination pressure test. The three cooks had to re create chefs Harish Rao's dish called Thikadi which uses Mutton as the meat of the dish.; Bottom Three: Krithika Sivanesan, Kruthaj Ashok Kumar and Tara Rhine; Eliminated: Tara Rhine
7	"Episode 7, Season 1"	28 August 2021
Team Duo Challenge: The contestants are split up into 3 team. The team members are split up into 6 pairs. The contestants need to cook their dish using food waste such as Banana skin etc and make either an Entrée, Main course or Dessert: Team Red; 1. Contestants: Devaki Vijayaraman, Kruthaj Ashok Kumar, Aarthi Satheesh and Mariam Shajia Shah.; 2. Key Ingredients for Entrée: egg shells, fishbone and chicken feet.; Team Blue; 1. Contestants: Sunitha Selva, Sasi Gnanadurai, Krithika Sivanesan and Nausheen Yusuf.; 2. Key Ingredients for Main course: banana peel, watermelon rind and the seeds of Jackfruit.; Team Yellow; 1. Contestants: Nithya Franklyn, Sumitra Rajesh, Manikandan K and Vinny Shukla.; 2. Key Ingredients for Dessert: peels of peas, corn cob and residue water of boiled chickpeas.; Challenge Winners: 1. Aarthi Satheesh and Mariam Shajia Shah; 2. Krithika Sivanesan and Nausheen Yusuf; 3. Manikandan K and Vinny Shukla
8	"Episode 8, Season 1"	29 August 2021
Ingredient Guessing Challenge Winner: Devaki Vijayaraman, Kruthaj Ashok Kumar and Nithya Franklyn; Elimination Challenge: The bottom three people had to participate in an ingredient guessing challenge and face elimination pressure test of they get the ingredient wrong, and has to cook a dish of their own using the same ingredient they got wrong.; Bottom Three: Sumitra Rajesh, Sunitha Selva and Sasi Gnanadurai; Eliminated: Sasi Gnanadurai
9	"Episode 9, Season 1 (The Wildcard Challenge)"	4 September 2021
Wildcard Challenge: The previously eliminated contestants received a second chance to win their spot back in the kitchen. However only one of the contestants will be selected back into the game.; Eliminated: Sasi Gnanadurai and Shashi Anand Sridharan; Returned: Tara Rhine; Special Guest: Nikki Galrani
10	"Episode 10, Season 1"	5 September 2021
Immunity Pin Challenge: Home cooks had to compete in the challenge to win the immunity pin which saves them from elimination in the competition.; Top three: Kruthaj Ashok Kumar, Manikandan K and Nausheen Yusuf; Winner of Immunity Pin: Nausheen Yusuf; Special Guest: Nikki Galrani
11	"Vinayaka Chaturti special episode"	10 September 2021
All home cooks are free from elimination and competition since its the great festival Vinayaka Chaturti, but home cooks need to create a special dish which is equivalent to the festive mood but won't be judged for their dish.: Special Host: Shali Nivekas
12	"Episode 12, Season 1"	11 September 2021
JW Marriott Hotels Challenge: Home cooks were divided into two teams for this challenge, each team had to cook an Entree, Main course and dessert for customers at the hotel.; Team Red; 1. Contestants: Krithika Sivanesan, Mariam Shajia Shah, Nausheen Yusuf, Nithya Franklyn, Sunitha Selva and Tara Rhine .; Team Red Captain: Nausheen Yusuf; Team Blue; 1. Contestants: Aarthi Satheesh, Devaki Vijayaraman, Kruthaj Ashok Kumar, Manikandan K, Sumitra Rajesh and Vinny Shukla.; Team Blue Captain: Aarthi Satheesh; Eventually the blue team had the highest score and was saved from participating in the elimination challenge.
13	"Episode 13, Season 1"	12 September 2021
Ingredient Guessing Challenge: After a team challenge, Krithika Sivanesan, Mariam Shajia Shah, Nausheen Yusuf, Nithya Franklyn, Sunitha Selva and Tara Rhine (Team Red) received the lowest and had to compete in the Ingredient Guessing Challenge. The six cooks had to identify the ingredient used in chefs Harish Rao's dish.; Winner: Krithika Sivanesan, Nithya Franklyn and Sunitha Selva.; Elimination Challenge: The top three bottom performed cooks had to participate in the elimination pressure test. The three cooks had to re create chefs Harish Rao's dish called Ragasiya Marmam which uses Vada as the meat of the dish.; Eliminated: Mariam Shajia Shah and Tara Rhine
14	"Episode 14, Season 1"	18 September 2021
Ethirum Puthirum Challenge: Each home cooks need to cook a two mystery items.; Winners: Krithika Sivanesan, Nithya Franklyn, Kruthaj Ashok Kumar and Sumitra Rajesh
15	"Episode 15, Season 1"	19 September 2021
Elimination Challenge: Aarthi Satheesh, Devaki Vijayaraman, Manikandan K, Nausheen Yusuf, Sunitha Selva and Vinny Shukla had to cook a dish with all Arusuvai (Six Tastes) Ingredients chosen by other contestants, who answer the judges riddle correctly.; Eliminated: Aarthi Satheesh
16	"Episode 16, Season 1"	25 September 2021
Team Relay Challenge: The contestant are divided into 3 teams with 3 members each. Duration of the challenge is 60 minutes and divided into 3 halves. The contestants have to choose one ingredient each (i.e, herbs, chocolates and fruits).; Team Red; 1. Contestants: Krithika Sivanesan, Kruthaj Ashok Kumar and Vinny Shukla.; Team Red Captain: Krithika Sivanesan; Team Blue; 1. Contestants: Manikandan K, Nithya Franklyn and Sumitra Rajesh; Team Blue Captain: Manikandan K; Team Green; 1. Contestants: Devaki Vijayaraman, Nausheen Yusuf and Sunitha Selva; Team Green Captain: Devaki Vijayaraman; Winner: Team Blue won the challenge.
17	"Episode 17, Season 1"	26 September 2021
Diary Challenge: The contestants had to convert milk into butter and add flavor to them. Krithika Sivanesan, Nausheen Yusuf and Devaki Vijayaraman won the challenge.; Elimination Challenge: Vinny Shukla, Kruthaj Ashok Kumar and Sunitha Selva had to choose one ingredient (pineapple, jaggery and curd) along with (pineapple rasam, jaggery water and buttermilk).; Eliminated: Kruthaj Ashok Kumar
18	"Episode 18, Season 1"	2 October 2021
Mystery box challenge: Winners: Devaki Vijayaraman and Sumitra Rajesh; Special Guest: Remya Nambeesan
19	"Episode 19, Season 1"	3 October 2021
Random Item Challenge: Eliminated : Nausheen Yusuf
20	"Episode 20, Season 1"	9 October 2021
Home cooks need to make a dessert using flowers.: Special Guest: Gayathrie
21	"Episode 21, Season 1"	10 October 2021
The black apron contestants need to re create the signature dish of chef Aarthi Sampath called Kasthuri Thangam.: Eliminated: Sunitha Selva
22	"Episode 22, Season 1"	16 October 2021
Pair Challenge : The top 6 contestants are fixed in a pair challenge: Team Purple: 1. Manikandan K and Sumitra; Team Red: 1. Vinny Shukla and Nithya Franklyn; Team Blue: 1. Devaki Vijayaraman and Krithika Sivanesan; As Vinny and Nithya won the challenge, they advanced to the Masterchef balcony, with the remaining 4 contestants competing in the black apron challenge.
23	"Episode 23, Season 1"	17 October 2021
The chefs announced that this was the final black apron challenge to be conducted in this season of Masterchef, indicating that the contestants who pass the challenge advance to the final stage of Masterchef season 1. The black apron contestants are supposed to re-create a traditional Indian sweet in a modern look and appearance, without utilising an oven or a freezer: Eliminated: Sumitra Rajesh
24	"Episode 24, Season 1"	23 October 2021
The top 5 home cooks need to do a dish which is close to their hearts. The three best home cooks will perform in the level 2 challenge while the remaining two cooks will compete in the elimination challenge. the best cook who cooks the best dish in level 2 will become the first finalist of season.
25	"Episode 25, Season 1"	24 October 2021
Ticket to finale Challenge: The cooks had to make a dish using seafood in order to win the ticket to finale. The cook with the best dish wins a spot in the finale.: Finalist: Krithika Sivanesan
26	"Semi Finale round (Part 1)"	6 November 2021
Semi Finale challenge The remaining 4 cooks beside Krithika, needs to compete in the challenge only were 2 of them will be selected as finalist and advance to the finale.: Finalist: Nithya Franklyn; Finalist: Devaki Vijayaraman
27	"Semi Finale round (part 2)"	7 November 2021
Semi Finale challenge (part 2) Vinny Shukla and Manikandan K, had to give a cooking face off with only 1 of them given the chance to go to the finale and become a finalist, while the remaining cook will be eliminated from the show.: Finalist: Vinny Shukla; Eliminated: Manikandan K
28	"Bonus episode"	13 November 2021
Host Vijay Sethupathi, Talks about the journey that every contestant had in Masterchef Tamil season 1.
29–30	"Grand Finale"	14 November 2021
The grand finale had two main rounds, the first round being where all the home cooks need to cook a main course meal using the key ingredient duck. The second round featured a dessert round where the cooks can make a dessert of their choice. At the end of the rounds, the marks given by the judges were counted and Vinny Shukla and Krithika Sivanesan were eliminated leaving the remaining two home cooks Nithya Franklyn and Devaki Vijayaraman in the top 2. Devaki Vijayaraman won the season while Nithya Franklyn emerged as the runner up.: Eliminated: Vinny Shukla; Eliminated: Krithika Sivanesan; Runner Up: Nithya Franklyn; Title Winner: Devaki Vijayaraman
