= MasterChef India – Tamil =

Indian cooking reality television series

- Genre: Reality; Cookery
- Created by: Franc Roddam
- Based on: MasterChef Australia
- Directed by: Sanjeev K Kumar
- Presented by: Vijay Sethupathi (Season 1); Shali Nivekas (Season 1); Samantha Ruth Prabhu (Celebrity MasterChef)
- Judges: Harish Rao; Aarthi Sampath; Koushik Shankar; Shreeya Adka; Rakesh Raghunathan
- Country of origin: India
- Original language: Tamil
- No. of seasons: 2
- No. of episodes: 80

Production
- Producers: Endemol Shine India; Banijay Asia
- Production locations: Innovative Film City, Bengaluru; Mumbai
- Camera setup: Multiple-camera
- Running time: 48-51 minutes
- Production companies: Endemol Shine India; Banijay Asia; Innovative Film Academy; Alankar Pandian's Invenio Origin

Original release
- Network: Sun TV (Season 1); SonyLIV (Season 2-present)
- Release: 7 August 2021 – present

Related
- MasterChef India – Hindi; MasterChef India – Telugu

MasterChef India – Tamil (or simply MasterChef Tamil) is an Indian Tamil-language competitive cooking reality show based on MasterChef Australia and is part of MasterChef India. The series features amateur and home chefs competing to win the title of 'MasterChef'. The current line-up of judges consists Koushik Shankar, Rakesh Raghunathan, and Shreeya Adka.

The debut season of the Tamil version of MasterChef in 2021 made the MasterChef format surpass 500 seasons worldwide.

== Format ==
The show features 14 contestants (only commoner people), with three chefs as judges. It is broadcast weekly every Saturday and Sunday on Sun TV at 9:30pm (India Time). In Season 1, the top 24 competed until 14 were left, with the final 14 progressing to the main stage of the show. The winner competes for a prize that includes their own restaurant, the chance to have their own chef coat, and ₹ 25,00,000 in cash and the MasterChef trophy.

=== Episodes ===
MasterChef India - Tamil aired two nights a week on the weekends. Each night features a different episode format, however, some episodes modify the format slightly. The typical episode formats are as follows:

Saturdays usually feature a cooking challenge — each home cook participates in a Mystery Challenge, Pair Challenge, or a Team Challenge. They are asked to prepare a dish using a core ingredient(s) featured that day. Depending on their performance, the judges declare the ones with the top dishes safe from the Pressure Test, which takes place the following day; the participants performing poorly go on to compete in the Pressure Test.

Sundays typically feature a Pressure Test or some other form of Elimination Challenge. The bottom three contestants from the preceding night are given a recipe for a particular dish which they are to emulate in an allotted time. The judges then taste their outputs and depending on their level of performance, select one contestant — whose performance was the poorest — who is eliminated from the competition.

In season 2, the format changed and the show aired daily.

== Hosts and judges ==
| Starring | Season 1 | Season 2 |
|---|---|---|
| Aarthi Sampath | Judge | |
| Harish Rao | Judge | |
| Koushik Shankar | Judge | Judge and Host |
| Rakesh Raghunathan | | Judge and Host |
| Shreeya Adka | | Judge and Host |
| Shali Nivekas | Guest Host | |
| Vijay Sethupathi | Host | |

== Series ==
| Season | Host | Judges | | | First aired | Last aired | No. of episodes | No. of contestants | Winner | Runner up | TRP rating | Network | Notes |
| Season | Host | 1 | 2 | 3 | First aired | Last aired | No. of episodes | No. of contestants | Winner | Runner up | TRP rating | Network | Notes |
|---|---|---|---|---|---|---|---|---|---|---|---|---|---|
| 1 | Vijay Sethupathi & Shali Nivekas | Harish Rao | Aarthi Sampath | Koushik Shankar | 7 August 2021 | 14 November 2021 | 30 | 14 | Devaki Vijayaraman | Nithya Franklyn | 8.71 | Sun TV | |
| 2 | None | Rakesh Raghunathan | Shreeya Adka | Koushik Shankar | 22 April 2024 | 7 June 2024 | 50 | 12 | Akash Muralidharan | Zarina Banu & Vani Sundar | | SonyLIV | |

== Season 1 ==
The first season of MasterChef India – Tamil aired from 7 August 2021. Hosted by Vijay Sethupathi, while professional chefs such as Harish Rao, Aarthi Sampath and Koushik Shankar are the judges for this season. The show telecasted on every Saturday and Sunday on Sun TV. It also streamed on Sun NXT platform. The season was won by Devaki Vijayaraman from Trichy, Tamil Nadu while Nithya Franklyn emerged as the runner up.

== Season 2 ==
The second season of MasterChef India – Tamil was announced in 2023. Koushik Shankar will return from season 1, alongside new judges Rakesh Raghunathan and Shreeya Adka. The three judges were introduced on MasterChef India – Hindi on 20 November 2023. The season was won by Akash Muralidharan from Chennai, Tamil Nadu while Zarina Banu and Vani Sundar emerged as the runner ups.

== Production ==
=== Development ===
In early 2021, Sun TV Network secured the production rights of MasterChef in Tamil. And in 2024, SonyLIV secured the rights for the 2nd season.

=== Filming ===
Filming of the show began in late June 2021 for the first season. The filming started for the 2nd season in late 2023.

== Celebrity MasterChef Tamil ==
In August 2026, Sony Pictures Networks India announced Celebrity MasterChef Tamil, a spin-off featuring celebrities as contestants, hosted by Samantha Ruth Prabhu. The series is produced by Banijay Asia and it premiered on Sony Vizha television channel and it is currently streaming on SonyLIV.

== Other versions ==
Regarding other Indian regional languages, MasterChef was initially adapted in Hindi under the name of MasterChef India – Hindi. MasterChef India – Telugu debuted alongside the Tamil version in 2021 on Sun TV's sister channel Gemini TV. Kannada and Malayalam adaptations were planned, but have not yet started production as of 2024.
