= MasterChef India – Telugu =

Indian cooking reality television series

- Also known as: MasterChef Telugu
- Telugu: మాస్టర్ చెఫ్ ఇండియా – తెలుగు
- Genre: Reality; Cookery
- Based on: MasterChef Australia
- Directed by: Sanjeev K. Kumar; (Season 1)
- Presented by: Tamannaah Bhatia; (Season 1); Anasuya Bharadwaj; (Season 1)
- Judges: Chalapathi Rao; (Season 1–present); Sanjay Thumma; (Season 1–present); Mahesh Padala; (Season 1); Nikitha Umesh; (Season 2)
- Country of origin: India
- Original language: Telugu
- No. of seasons: 2

Production
- Production locations: Innovative Film City, Bengaluru; (Season 1); Mumbai; (Season 2)
- Camera setup: Multi-camera
- Running time: 48 minutes
- Production companies: Endemol Shine India; (Season 1–present); Innovative Film Academy; (Season 1); Alankar Pandian's Invenio Origin; (Season 1)

Original release
- Network: Gemini TV; (Season 1); SonyLIV; (Season 2)

Related
- MasterChef India – Hindi; MasterChef India – Tamil

MasterChef India – Telugu (or colloquially MasterChef Telugu) is an Indian Telugu-language competitive cooking reality show based on MasterChef Australia and is part of MasterChef India. Produced by Endemol Shine India and co-produced by Innovative film Academy, it started broadcasting on Gemini TV and Sun NXT on 27 August 2021.

== Format ==
The show features 14 contestants, a host, and three chefs as judges. The winner will receive the MasterChef title and a cash prize of ₹25 lakh.

== Series ==
Season	Host	Judges			First Aired	Last Aired	No. of episodes	No. of contestants	Winner	Runner-up	Ref.
Season	Host	1	2	3	First Aired	Last Aired	No. of episodes	No. of contestants	Winner	Runner-up	Ref.
1	Tamannaah Bhatia (Episode 1–16); Anasuya Bharadwaj (Episode 17–24)	Chef Chalapathi Rao	Chef Sanjay Thumma	Chef Mahesh Padala	27 August 2021	27 November 2021	28	14	K. Krishna Tejasvi	G. D. Anusha	

== Season 1 ==
MasterChef India – Telugu season 1 aired from 27 August 2021 to 27 November 2021 on Gemini TV and also available on Sun NXT platform. Tamannaah Bhatia hosted the first 16 episodes, while Anasuya Bharadwaj hosted episodes 17–24. The remaining episodes had no host. Professional chefs Chalapathi Rao, Sanjay Thumma and Mahesh Padala served as judges. K. Krishna Tejasvi, a home baker from Hyderabad, won the competition, with G. D. Anusha as the runner-up and Kamal Jakkilinki from Vizag as the 2nd runner-up.

== Production ==
=== Development ===
In early 2021, Sun TV Network secured the production rights for MasterChef in Telugu. In late June 2021, Tamannaah confirmed her role as the show's host by sharing a behind-the-scenes picture. The show is set to have 28 episodes. An entire set designed by Omung Kumar, consists of 20 countertops, a pantry and a balcony, was created at the Innovative Film Academy for shooting. The makers chose a multiple-camera setup for the series.

=== Filming ===
The show is directed by Sanjeev K. Kumar and filming began in late June 2021.

== Other versions ==
MasterChef was initially adapted in Hindi under the name of MasterChef India – Hindi. Later it was adapted into Tamil as MasterChef India – Tamil. In addition, Kannada and Malayalam adaptations are planned.
