= MasterChef India – Telugu season 1 =

Season of television series

MasterChef India – Telugu
- Season 1
- Presented by: Tamannaah Bhatia; (Episode 1–16); Anasuya Bharadwaj; (Episode 17–24)
- Judges: Chalapathi Rao; Sanjay Thumma; Mahesh Padala
- No. of contestants: 14
- Winner: K. Krishna Tejasvi
- Runner-up: Kamal Jakkilink
- No. of episodes: 28

Release
- Original network: Gemini TV; Sun NXT
- Original release: 27 August – 27 November 2021

Season 1 of the Indian Telugu-language competitive reality TV series MasterChef India – Telugu aired from 27 August 2021 to 27 November 2021 on Gemini TV. Tamannaah Bhatia hosted the first 16 episodes, while Anasuya Bharadwaj took over episodes 17–24. No host was present for the remaining episodes. Professional chefs Chalapathi Rao, Sanjay Thumma and Mahesh Padala served as the judges. The winner of the competition was K. Krishna Tejasvi, a home baker from Hyderabad, with G. D. Anusha as the runner-up.

== Format ==
Out of approximately 5000 applicants, 800 were chosen for virtual auditions. From these, one hundred winners advanced to a live audition at Innovative Film City, Bengaluru. The top 20 home cooks from this round competed in the MasterChef apron challenge, with the winners securing a spot in the Top 14.

== Top 14 ==
No	Contestant	Age	Hometown	Occupation	Status
1	K. Krishna Tejasvi	32	Hyderabad, Telangana	home baker	Winner; 27 November
2	G. D. Anusha	22	Hyderabad, Telangana	house surgeon	Runner-up; 27 November
3	Kamal Jakkilinki	32	Vizag, Andhra Pradesh	fashion designer	Third; 27 November
4	K. Parvathi Anupama	48	Secunderabad, Telangana	housewife	Eliminated; 26 November
5	Mohammad Abdul Khader	30	Hyderabad, Telangana	CEO	Eliminated; 26 November
6	Rachakonda Sai Sri	19	Mancherial, Telangana	engineering student	Eliminated; 20 November
7	Nazimunisha Mohammad	27	Hyderabad, Telangana	student	Eliminated; 6 November
8	Thakur Jaideep Singh	52	Hyderabad, Telangana	retired corporate secretary	Eliminated; 30 October
9	Sourabh Aravind	37	Hyderabad, Telangana	architect	Eliminated; 24 October
10	Manisha Panda	24	Vizag, Andhra Pradesh	safety officer	Re-eliminated; 16 October; Eliminated; 4 September
11	O. P. Manoj Kumar	23	Hyderabad, Telangana	MNC employee	Eliminated; 9 October
12	Massirala Sarat Kumar	31	Vizag, Andhra Pradesh	digital marketing	Eliminated; 2 October
13	Madhavi Mohan	42	Hyderabad, Telangana	housewife	Re-eliminated; 24 September; Eliminated; 18 September
14	Priyadarshi Sahgal	57	Hyderabad, Telangana	brand consultant	Re-eliminated; 24 September; Eliminated; 11 September

== Elimination Table ==
No.	Contestant	Episode																																			
No.	Contestant	1	2			3	4		5	6		7	8		9	10	11	12		13	14	15	16		17	18		19	20	21	22	23	24	25	26	27	28
1	Tejasvi	DNP	WON	SAFE		TOP	BTM	PT	TOP	WON	SAFE	IN	WON	SAFE	SAFE	IN	IN	BTM	PT	IN	PT	IN	WON	SAFE	IN	BTM	PT	BTM	PT	BTM	PT	IN	DNP	BTM	WON	TOP	WINNER
2	Anusha	PELM	DNP	PT	WON	IN	WON	SAFE	WON	SAFE		WON	SAFE		SAFE	DNP	WON	SAFE		WON	SAFE	WON	SAFE		WON	SAFE		BTM	PT	WON	SAFE	TOP	WON	SAFE		TOP	RUNNER-UP
3	Kamal	WON	SAFE			WON	SAFE		WON	SAFE		WON	SAFE		SAFE	IN	WON	SAFE		DNP		TOP	BTM	PT	WON	SAFE		WON	SAFE	BTM	PT	IN	DNP	WON	SAFE	TOP	THIRD
4	Anupama	DNP	WON	SAFE		IN	WON	SAFE	IN	BTM	PT	IN	WON	SAFE	SAFE	IN	WON	SAFE		WON	SAFE	WON	SAFE		WON	SAFE		BTM	PT	BTM	PT	IN	DNP	BTM	WON	ELIM	
5	Abdul	DNP	WON	SAFE		WON	SAFE		IN	WON	SAFE	WON	SAFE		SAFE	IN	IN	WON	SAFE	IN	PT	IN	WON	SAFE	IN	WON	SAFE	WON	SAFE	BTM	PT	TOP	IN	BTM	WON	ELIM	
6	Sai Sri	PELM	DNP	PT	WON	IN	WON	SAFE	IN	WON	SAFE	WON	SAFE		SAFE	IN	IN	WON	SAFE	WON	SAFE	WON	SAFE		IN	WON	SAFE	WON	SAFE	BTM	PT	IN	DNP	BTM	ELIM		
7	Nazimunisha	WON	SAFE			IN	WON	SAFE	WON	SAFE		WON	SAFE		SAFE	IN	WON	SAFE		IN	PT	IN	WON	SAFE	IN	BTM	PT	WON	SAFE	BTM	ELIM						
8	Jaideep	DNP	PELM	PT	WON	IN	WON	SAFE	TOP	BTM	PT	IN	WON	SAFE	SAFE	IN	IN	BTM	PT	WON	SAFE	IN	BTM	PT	IN	WON	SAFE	BTM	ELIM								
9	Sourabh	WON	SAFE			IN	WON	SAFE	IN	WON	SAFE	IN	BTM	PT	SAFE	IMN	IN	WON	SAFE	IN	PT	IN	IMN	SAFE	IN	BTM	ELIM										
10	Manisha	DNP	WON	SAFE		IN	BTM	PELM	DNP						PT	IN	IN	WON	SAFE	WON	SAFE	IN	BTM	ELIM													
11	Manoj	PELM	DNP	PT	BTM	TOP	WON	PT	IN	WON	SAFE	IN	BTM	PT	SAFE	IN	IN	WON	SAFE	IN	ELIM																
12	Sarat	DNP	WON	SAFE		IN	WON	SAFE	IN	WON	SAFE	WON	SAFE		SAFE	IN	IN	BTM	ELIM																		
13	Madhavi	DNP	WON	SAFE		IN	BTM	PT	WON	SAFE		IN	BTM	PELM	ELIM																						
14	Priyadarshi	WON	SAFE			IN	WON	SAFE	IN	BTM	PELM	DNP			ELIM																						
15	Rajesh	PELM	DNP	PT	ELIM																																
15	Ram	DNP	PELM	PT	ELIM																																
15	Anitha	DNP	PELM	ELIM																																	
15	Lakshmi	PELM	DNP	ELIM																																	
15	Nikhila	PELM	DNP	ELIM																																	
15	Sridevi	PELM	DNP	ELIM																																	

(WON) The cook won the individual/pair challenge and was safe for the next challenge(s).
(WON) The cook won the team challenge and was safe for the next challenge(s).
(IMN) The cook won/used an Immunity Pin in the challenge.
(WON) The cook won the individual challenge and was promoted as a finalist.
(SAFE) The cook did not participate in the challenge as he/she already advanced to the next round.
(TOP) The cook was one of the top entries in the individual/pair challenge but failed.
(IN) The cook was not chosen as a top or bottom entry in the individual/pair challenge.
(IN) The cook was not chosen as a top or bottom entry in the team challenge.
(WAIT) The cook was waiting for the result.
(DNP) The cook did not participate in the challenge(s) due to the result of the previous challenge or personal problems.
(BTM) The cook was one of the bottom entries in the individual challenge and had to compete in the next elimination challenge.
(BTM) The cook was one of the bottom entries in the team challenge and had to compete in the next elimination challenge.
(PT) The cook competed in the elimination challenge and advanced.
(PELM) The cook was eliminated but later given a second chance to participate in an upcoming challenge.
(ELIM) The cook was eliminated from MasterChef.

== Guest appearances ==
- Allu Sirish
- Chef Rajesh Kadakanthala
- V. M. L. Karthikeyan

== Episodes ==
Episode	Event	Original air date	Ref.
1	Series Premiere: Apron Challenge Part 1 Tamannaah randomly selected ten cooks from the Top 20. They were required to prepare their signature dish within an hour to earn MasterChef aprons. Priyadarshi, Sourabh, and Nazimunisha successfully earned their aprons, securing places in the Top 14. The others were eliminated, with Kamal remaining to await the results.	27 August 2021	
2	Apron Challenge Part 2 Kamal performed well and earned a spot in the Top 14. The remaining ten cooks from the Top 20 were given the opportunity to prepare their signature dish within an hour to win MasterChef aprons. Six cooks succeeded, earning their places in the Top 14, while the others were eliminated. All eliminated contestants were granted a second chance to earn an apron by passing a skill test followed by a food test. Three cooks successfully completed the challenges and secured spots in the Top 14. Manoj's placement in the Top 14 was conditional, as he had to face an elimination challenge to secure his position, while the others were eliminated.	28 August 2021	
3	Top 14 Mystery Box Challenge Tamannaah revealed the mystery box, and the Top 14 home cooks had to create a dish using at least four ingredients from it. They had one hour to compete for a spot on the balcony. Kamal won the best dish of the day, securing a place on the balcony alongside Abdul. Both are safe for the week, while the others will face more challenges in the next episode.	3 September 2021	
4	Skill and Pressure Elimination Challenges The judges introduced a "mise en place" skill test for the home cooks, requiring them to complete it within 15 minutes. Madavi, Manisha and Tejasvi did not finish in time and received black aprons, leading them to the elimination round. Although Manoj won the challenge, he still faced elimination due to previous conditions. The others secured spots on the balcony. In the pressure test, the four cooks had to recreate Chef Chalapathi's signature dish, "Jugalbandi". Manisha was eliminated, while the others passed the test. Manoj finally earned his named apron.	4 September 2021	
5	Innovation Challenge The judges presented several ingredients to the home cooks and asked them to select only three items each. Initially, the challenge was to create a sweet dish using those ingredients, but Tamannaah intervened and changed it to a beverage challenge. Previous week's winners, Kamal and Abdul, had the first choice of ingredients and determined the order in which the others would select theirs. The home cooks had half an hour to complete the challenge. Kamal won the best drink of the day and secured a spot on the balcony, along with Nazimunisha, Anusha and Madhavi in the winning order. The others will face more challenges in the next episode.	10 September 2021	
6	Team equipment and Recreation Challenges In the team challenge, the judges divided the remaining home cooks into three teams: Red (Abdul, Manoj and Sai Sri), Blue (Sarat, Sourabh and Sai Sree), and Green (Anupama, Jaideep and Priyadarshi). Each team had to make a savory dish and a sweet dish within an hour using the given equipment. Tamannaah revealed the three pieces of equipment, and the judges allowed Kamal to assign the equipment to each team. The Red and Blue teams won the challenge and moved to the balcony. The Green team lost the challenge and had to face an elimination test. Chef Mahesh asked them to recreate his signature dish in an hour. Anupama and Jaideep passed the challenge, but Priyadarshi was eliminated from the show.	11 September 2021	
7	Thaali Challenge In the Thaali Challenge, Tamannaah asked the home cooks to prepare a minimum six-course meal for herself and the judges. The cooks were divided into two teams: Red (Abdul, Anusha, Kamal, Nazimunisha, Sai Sri and Sarat) and Blue (Anupama, Jaideep, Madhavi, Manoj, Sourabh and Tejasvi). Each team had two hours to complete the challenge. The Red team won and moved to the balcony, with Kamal winning the best dish of the day. The Blue team lost and will face more challenges in the next episode.	17 September 2021	
8	Taste Test and Elimination Challenge In the taste test, the judges asked the home cooks to identify the dominant flavor from a set of six food items that were handed out one by one. Anupama, Jaideep and Tejasvi emerged as the winners of the challenge. Impressed by Anupama's tasting skills, the judges awarded her a prize. The remaining contestants had to face the elimination challenge. Given an ingredient they couldn't identify, they were tasked with creating dishes using it within an hour. While Manoj and Sourabh passed the challenge, unfortunately, Madhavi was eliminated from the show.	18 September 2021	
9	Double Elimination Challenge The episode kicked off with a light-hearted chat between Tamannaah and the home cooks, where Abdul was recognized as the Most Positive Home Cook. Following this, the judges announced that everyone was safe for the day and granted a second chance to previously eliminated cooks (Madhavi, Manisha, and Priyadarshi). They were tasked with preparing their favorite dish within an hour. Just as the cooks were about to begin, the judges swapped their cooking stations, adding an extra challenge. Ultimately, Manisha emerged as the winner of the challenge, while the others were permanently eliminated from the show.	24 September 2021	
10	Immunity Pin Challenge Allu Sirish made a special appearance on the show as a guest. After a brief and fun chat, he challenged Tamannaah to a Dosa flip and emerged victorious. He also unveiled the MasterChef Immunity pin to everyone. The judges then introduced a three-round Immunity pin challenge for the cooks. Each cook was provided with eight eggs for the entire challenge. In the first round, the cooks had to make meringue, and the top six contestants advanced to the next round. In the second round, they were tasked with making poached eggs, and the top three contestants progressed to the final round. In the last round, the cooks had to prepare a special dish within an hour using the remaining eggs. Sourabh emerged as the winner of the immunity pin.	25 September 2021	
11	Relay Team Challenge The judges presented twelve ingredients to the home cooks, explaining each item. They allowed the cooks to pick one ingredient, with Tamannaah selecting Immunity challenge winner Sourabh as the first to choose. Those who chose their ingredient were then asked to select the next person in the queue. The cooks who received fruit were appointed as team captains and were guided by the judges in choosing their team members. Each team had to prepare a dish within an hour using the ingredients they obtained. Following a relay-style format, each team member had only a quarter of the total cooking time. Team Blue (Kamal, Anupama, Anusha and Nazimunisha) emerged victorious and earned a spot on the balcony. The remaining cooks faced additional challenges in the next episode.	1 October 2021	
12	Taste Test and Replication Challenge During the taste test, the judges presented a dish made from 43 ingredients to the home cooks and tasked them with identifying the components. Abdul, Manisha, Manoj, Sai Sri and Sourabh emerged victorious in the challenge. The remaining contestants were then required to face the elimination challenge. Chef Mahesh revealed that the dish they just tasted was his signature dish called "Sapta Sammohanam", and instructed the cooks to replicate it within an hour and a half. While Jaideep and Tejasvi successfully completed the challenge, Sarat was eliminated from the show.	2 October 2021	
13	One Pan Wonder Challenge The judges placed mystery boxes at each cook's countertop, and Tamannaah summoned them onstage. Inside, they discovered a pan in their mystery box. Chef Sanjay demonstrated how to cook with just one pan, effortlessly preparing four dishes. The cooks were then tasked with making any dish within an hour using the same method. Jaideep's dish stood out as the best of the day, earning him a spot on the balcony alongside Anusha, Anupama, Manisha and Sai Sri. The remaining contestants were left to confront more challenges in the next episode.	8 October 2021	
14	Elimination Challenge The remaining five home cooks were surprised by the judges with an elimination challenge. Tamannaah brought out a spinning wheel from the pantry that displayed various ingredients. Each cook would obtain their core ingredient based on the spinning wheel's result. Following this, Jaideep had the privilege of choosing the equipment for the cooks. They had one hour to complete the challenge. While Abdul, Nazimunisha, Sourabh and Tejasvi passed the challenge, unfortunately, Manoj was eliminated from the show.	9 October 2021	
15	Pair Challenge The show commenced with Tamannaah extending warm Dussehra wishes to everyone and serving sweets. The judges then instructed the cooks to open the cloches placed in front of them. Half of them discovered a place's name, while the rest found a dish inside their cloches. Those who received matching pairs of place and dish were grouped together. Each pair was tasked with recreating the dish they received. The judges allotted them 60 minutes to complete the challenge. The Anupama-Anusha pair impressed the judges and secured the title of the best dish of the day, earning them a place on the balcony. Similarly, the Kamal-Sai Sri pair emerged victorious, but only Sai Sri earned a spot on the balcony. Kamal was disqualified due to his absence last week, so he had to face the remaining challenges this week along with the others.	15 October 2021	
16	Skill test and Elimination Challenge In the skill test round, the judges instructed the cooks to decorate a cake within 30 minutes. Abdul, Nazimunisha and Tejwasi excelled in the challenge and emerged as winners. Sourabh avoided the next elimination challenge by surrendering his Immunity pin to Tamannaah. The judges then welcomed Chef Rajesh Kadakantala to the show, who presented his signature dish, "Golden-hued Irani chai cheesecake on Osmania cookie crust", and tasked the cooks with replicating it. They were given two hours for the challenge. While Kamal and Jaideep successfully completed the task, unfortunately, Manisha was eliminated from the show.	16 October 2021	
17	Box in box Challenge The show started with Anasuya, who introduced herself as the new host. In the Box in box challenge, cooks had to make a dish within 30, 45 or 60 minutes depending on how many boxes they opened. Anupama won the best dish of the day and got into the balcony with Anusha and Kamal. Rest had to face more challenges in the next episode.	22 October 2021	
18	Skill test and Elimination Challenge Judges thrown "mise en plan" as skill test for the cooks. They should finish it in 30 minutes. Abdul, Jaideep and Sai Sri won the challenge. Rest faced the elimination round in which they had to cook a dish with in an hour. Also, the main ingredient in their dish should be the waste of the previous challenge. Sourabh was eliminated from the show and the rest passed the challenge.	23 October 2021	
19	Six Tastes Challenge Judges gave six base ingredients of six tastes to each cook. The cooks had to make a dish within 60 minutes on condition that the dish expresses all six flavors. Abdul won the best dish of the day and got into the balcony with Kamal, Nazimunisha and Sai Sri. Rest had to face the elimination challenge.	29 October 2021	
20	Liquid to solid Elimination Challenge The judges gave each cook different liquid dishes and challenged them to re-create it in solid form. They should finish it in 60 minutes. Jaideep was eliminated from the show and the rest passed the challenge.	30 October 2021	
21	Firecracker Challenge On the auspicious occasion of Deepavali, the judges asked the cooks to make a dish inspired by firecrackers. The cooks had to complete the challenge within an hour. Anusha won the best dish of the day and went into balcony. The rest remained onstage to tackle the next challenge.	5 November 2021	
22	Barter Elimination Challenge The judges gave each cook a core ingredient and asked them to barter with each other to obtain at least three ingredients. The cooks had to complete the challenge within an hour. Nazimunisha was eliminated from the show.	6 November 2021	
23	Ticket to finale Challenge Part 1 To determine the first finalist of the season, the judges threw the Ticket to the final Challenge to the cooks. This was a two-phase challenge. In the first challenge, judges asked the cooks to make the best memorable dish of their lives within an hour. Abdul and Anusha qualified and stayed onstage to take on the second challenge. The rest were sent to the balcony.	12 November 2021	
24	Ticket to finale Challenge Part 2 In the second challenge, Abdul and Anusha had to cook along with chef Chalapathi and replicate his dish "Alanati Kodi Kura Vaibhavam". Anusha won the challenge and was chosen as the first finalist.	13 November 2021	
25	Semi Finals Part 1 In the "Flavours of the world challenge", the judges presented ten foreign ingredients to the home cooks and explained each item. They let the cooks to pick at least four ingredients. They had to make a dish within an hour and a half. Kamal won the best dish of the day and was promoted as the finalist. The rest remained onstage to tackle the next challenge.	19 November 2021	
26	Semi Finals Part 2 In the "Auction challenge", the judges gave the cooks two hours to make their dishes. But the cooks had to obtain the ingredients through an auction and the base value for the items was 5 minutes. Tejasvi, Anupama and Abdul won the challenge and were selected as finalists. Sai Sri was eliminated from the show.	20 November 2021	
27	Grand Finale Part 1 ln the "Pressure test challenge", the judges presented their signature dish "Trayam Pakam" and asked the cooks to replicate it. The cooks had two hours for the challenge. Kamal, Anusha and Tejasvi passed the challenge. Abdul and Anupama were eliminated from the show.	26 November 2021	
28	Grand Finale Part 2 In the final challenge, the judges tasked the cooks with creating their desired dish within a two-hour time frame. Prior to the announcement, Butterfly Director Karthikeyan was welcomed on stage by the judges. Tejasvi emerged victorious in the challenge, securing the title. Anusha claimed the runner-up position, while Kamal was eliminated from the show. The judges and Karthikeyan then distributed the awards among the finalists.	27 November 2021	
